= Pilat Regional Natural Park =

Protected area in France

Coordinates: 45°23′38″N 4°35′09″E

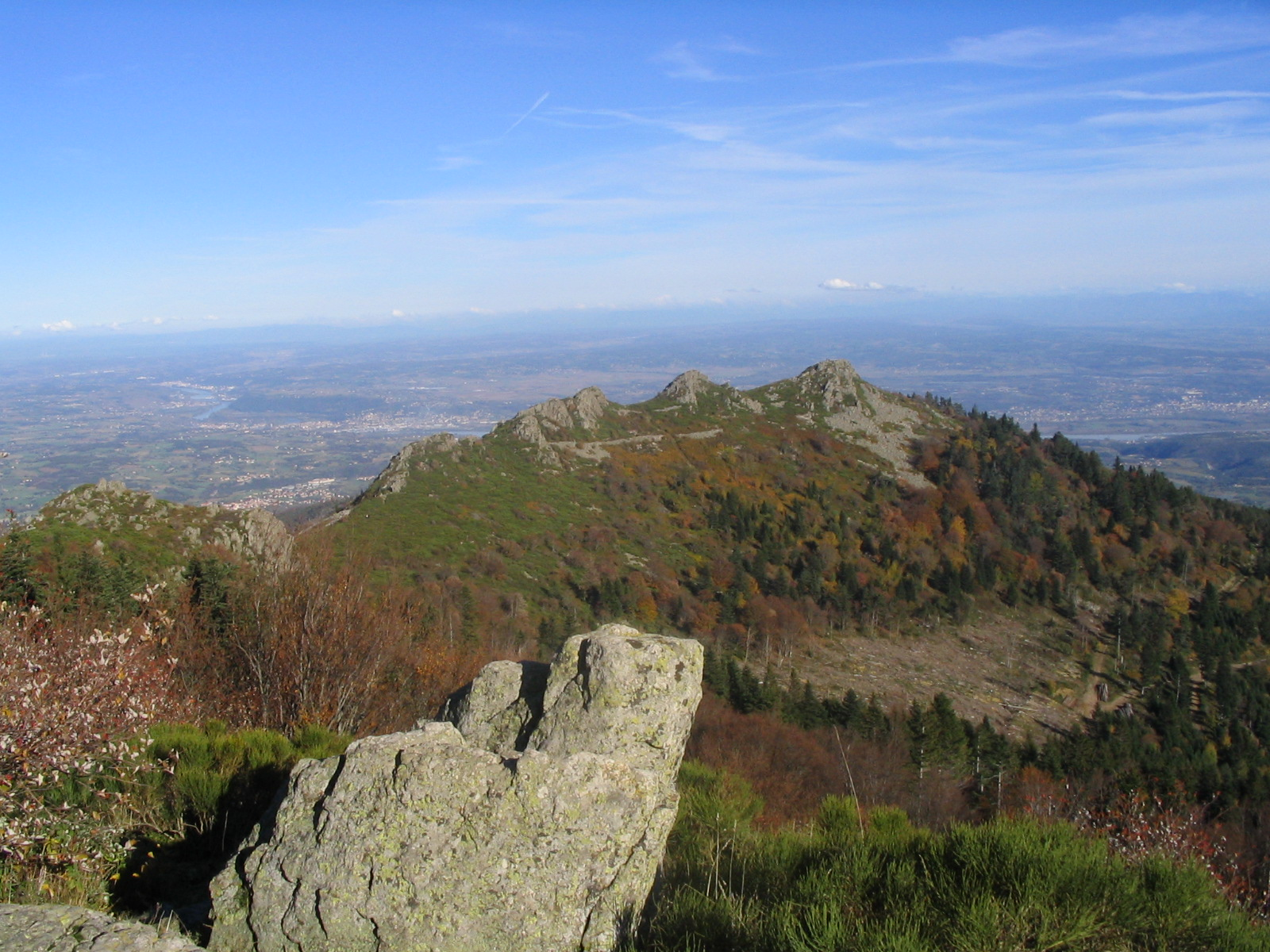
- Interactive map of Pilat Regional Natural Park
- Location: Auvergne-Rhône-Alpes, Loire; Rhône, France
- Governing body: Fédération des parcs naturels régionaux de France

Pilat Regional Natural Park (French: Parc naturel régional du Pilat) is a protected area of mountainous countryside in the Auvergne-Rhône-Alpes region of southeastern France. The park spans the departments of Loire and Rhône, and covers a total area of 65,000 hectares (160,000 acres).

The mountain terrain ranges from 140 metres (460 ft) to 1,432 metres (4,698 ft) in elevation. Forty-seven communes dot the landscape, with approximately fifty thousand residents. The land was officially designated a regional natural park in 1974.

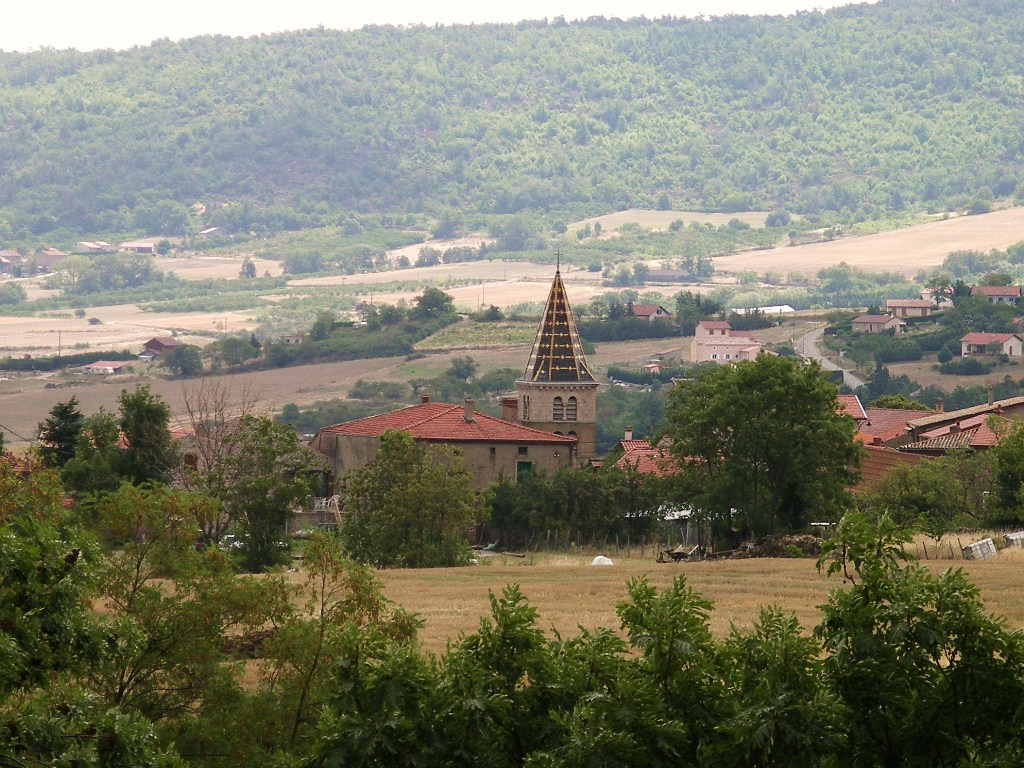
Saint-Appolinard commune, Massif Pilat in background

== Member communes ==
The park includes 47 member communes:

- Ampuis
- Le Bessat
- Bessey
- Bourg-Argental
- Burdignes
- Chavanay
- Chuyer
- La Chapelle-Villars
- Châteauneuf
- Colombier
- Condrieu
- Doizieux
- Échalas
- Farnay
- Graix
- Les Haies
- Jonzieux
- Loire-sur-Rhône
- Longes
- Lupé
- Maclas
- Malleval
- Marlhes
- Pavezin
- Pélussin
- Planfoy
- Roisey
- Saint-Appolinard
- Sainte-Croix-en-Jarez
- Saint-Genest-Malifaux
- Saint-Julien-Molin-Molette
- Saint-Michel-sur-Rhône
- Saint-Paul-en-Jarez
- Saint-Pierre-de-Bœuf
- Saint-Régis-du-Coin
- Saint-Romain-en-Gal
- Saint-Romain-les-Atheux
- Saint-Sauveur-en-Rue
- Tarentaise
- La Terrasse-sur-Dorlay
- Thélis-la-Combe
- Trèves
- Tupin-et-Semons
- La Valla-en-Gier
- Véranne
- Vérin
- La Versanne

== See also ==
- List of regional natural parks of France
