= Mont Pilat =

Mountainous area in France

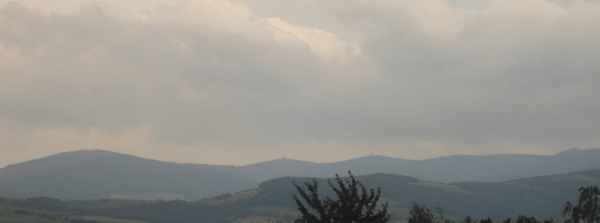
- Pilat viewed from Saint-Chamond, Loire

Highest point
- Peak: Crêt de la Perdrix
- Elevation: 1,432 m (4,698 ft)
- Coordinates: 45°22′57″N 4°34′21″E

Geography
- Location within France
- Country: France
- Department: Rhône, Loire

Mont Pilat or the Pilat massif is a mountainous area in the east of the Massif Central of France.

== Name ==
The origin of the name "Pilat" is uncertain. The word may have a Latin origin (Mons Pileatus). Another legend says that the body of Pontius Pilate was buried in the massif.

For a long time Mont Pilat designated the main mountain, with the double peaks or crests (crêts) of Perdrix and Oeillon. Modern maps generally designate this area as Les Crêts. However, the Conseil supérieur de l'audiovisuel (CSA) continues to use the term Mont Pilat to refer to the television transmitter on the Crêt de l'Oeillon.

The whole mountain range is commonly called Mont Pilat. The Communauté de communes des Monts du Pilat coordinates various administrative and developmental functions for the communes in the massif. The term Pilat is also used to refer to the area that became the Parc naturel régional du Pilat in 1974.

== Topography ==
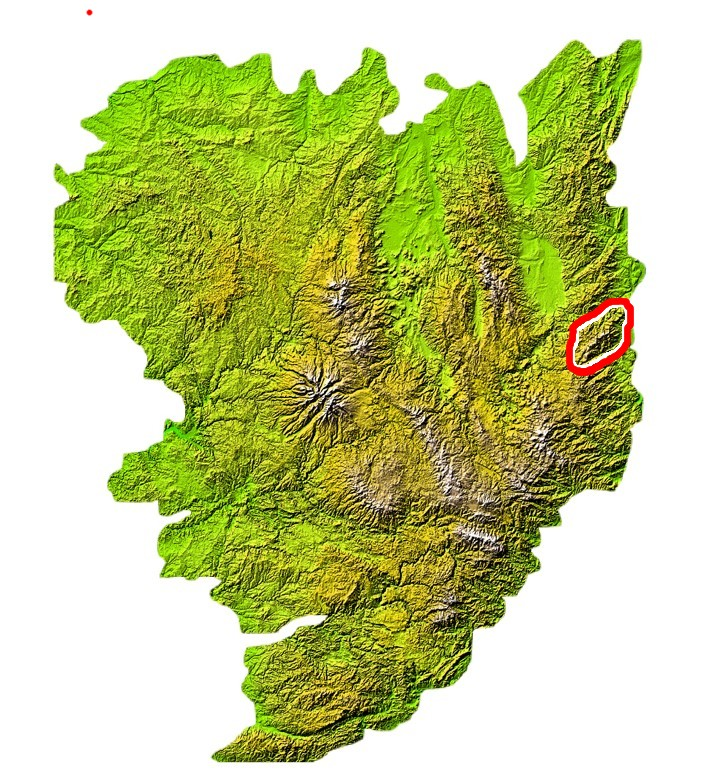
Location of the Pilat in the Massif Central

The Pilat massif is part of the French Massif Central range. It lies in the extreme east of the range looking over the Rhone valley. The overall orientation of the massif is from south-west to north-east, creating a variety of climates. The massif generally rises about 1,000 metres (3,300 ft) above its surroundings. Perdrix (Partridge mountain) rises to 1,431 metres (4,695 ft) above sea level and Pyfara and Panère are 1,390 metres (4,560 ft) high. Pilat is separated from the Monts du Lyonnais to the north by the Saint-Étienne basin, the Gier valley.

The Gier rises at La Jasserie on the Perdrix mountain at about 1,300 metres (4,300 ft). The river runs along the north side of the massif for 40.3 kilometres (25.0 mi) before joining the Rhone at Givors. The Gier receives the Janon from its left at Saint-Chamond. The Janon from Terrenoire (now part of Saint-Étienne) to Saint-Chamond and then the Gier from Saint-Chamond to Givors create a valley in the coal basin that runs between the Pilat massif and the Riverie chain of the Monts du Lyonnais.

== Climate ==
Pilat has a wide variety of plants, reflecting different climate zones in a relatively small area. The Rhone valley on the south of the massif has a warm Mediterranean climate. Fruit trees and vineyards are cultivated on the south-facing slopes. On the north side there is a cooler continental climate, with conifers, juniper and ferns. There is heavy snow in the winter. On the crests, the altitude, winds and snow prevent the growth of trees. Vegetation includes heath plants such as heather and bilberry.

Climate data for Mont Pilat (Crêt de l'Oeillon), 1370m (1981−2010 normals, 1994−2012 extremes)
Month	Jan	Feb	Mar	Apr	May	Jun	Jul	Aug	Sep	Oct	Nov	Dec	Year
Record high °C (°F)	17.8 (64.0)	16.0 (60.8)	19.2 (66.6)	21.5 (70.7)	25.6 (78.1)	31.2 (88.2)	29.1 (84.4)	32.6 (90.7)	25.3 (77.5)	23.6 (74.5)	17.7 (63.9)	14.6 (58.3)	32.6 (90.7)
Mean daily maximum °C (°F)	1.8 (35.2)	2.4 (36.3)	4.6 (40.3)	8.1 (46.6)	13.1 (55.6)	17.1 (62.8)	19.2 (66.6)	18.8 (65.8)	14.0 (57.2)	10.4 (50.7)	4.1 (39.4)	1.9 (35.4)	9.6 (49.3)
Daily mean °C (°F)	−0.7 (30.7)	−0.4 (31.3)	1.6 (34.9)	4.7 (40.5)	9.4 (48.9)	13.1 (55.6)	14.9 (58.8)	14.9 (58.8)	10.7 (51.3)	7.7 (45.9)	1.8 (35.2)	−0.6 (30.9)	6.4 (43.6)
Mean daily minimum °C (°F)	−3.3 (26.1)	−3.2 (26.2)	−1.4 (29.5)	1.3 (34.3)	5.6 (42.1)	9.0 (48.2)	10.7 (51.3)	10.9 (51.6)	7.4 (45.3)	5.0 (41.0)	−0.6 (30.9)	−3.1 (26.4)	3.2 (37.7)
Record low °C (°F)	−15.5 (4.1)	−20.4 (−4.7)	−16.8 (1.8)	−9.3 (15.3)	−4.1 (24.6)	−1.4 (29.5)	2.2 (36.0)	1.3 (34.3)	−1.5 (29.3)	−8.8 (16.2)	−12.6 (9.3)	−17.3 (0.9)	−20.4 (−4.7)
Average precipitation mm (inches)	53.8 (2.12)	42.1 (1.66)	48.3 (1.90)	73.4 (2.89)	103.8 (4.09)	76.2 (3.00)	76.3 (3.00)	77.1 (3.04)	79.6 (3.13)	116.8 (4.60)	121.5 (4.78)	68.0 (2.68)	936.9 (36.89)
Source: Meteociel

== History ==
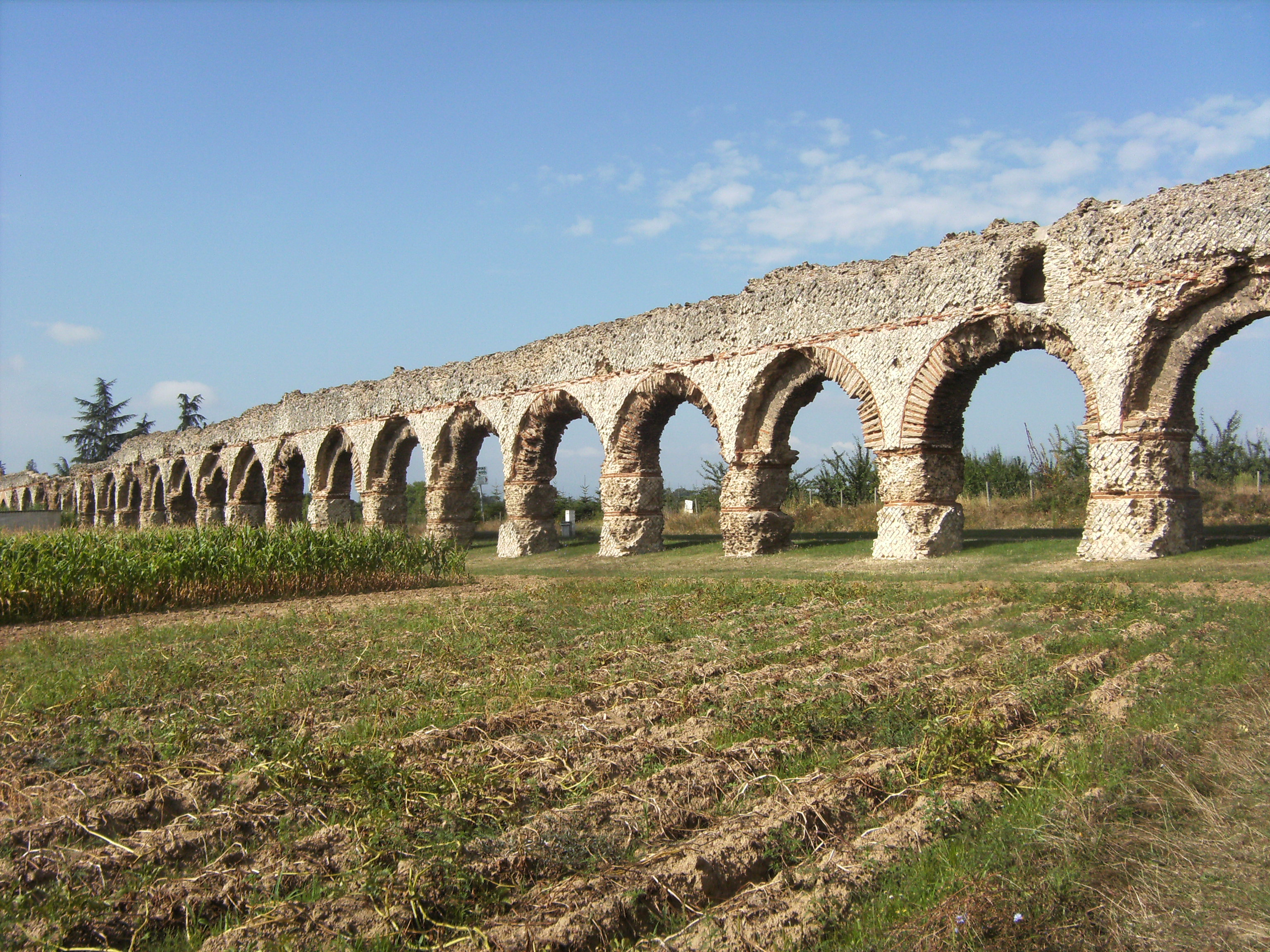
Aqueduct of the Gier at Chaponost

Flint and pottery found in the municipality of Saint-Genest-Malifaux show that humans were present in pre-historic times. During the Celtic era the Pilat was shared by two Celtic peoples, the Segusiavi and the Allobroges. They left many places of worship, arrangements of stones such as those at Château de Belize above Chuyer, the Rock Altar Roisey and La Garde, the sacred precincts of Saint-Sabin and the peak of the Three Teeth, and especially the "Menhir du Flat" near Colombier.

In Roman times the water of the river Gier was supplied to Lyon through the aqueduct of the Gier. The water was collected above Saint-Chamond and routed through tunnels, of which there are remains at Chagnon and Saint-Martin-la-Plaine, and aqueducts such as the one at Chaponost. During the Roman era Pilat formed the border between the provinces of Gallia Narbonensis and Gallia Lugdunensis. There are remains of Roman roads in places such as Pélussin and Saint-Régis-du-Coin.

On 1 November 1944 a U.S. Army Douglas C-47 Skytrain crashed due to bad weather carrying five crew members, army nurse lieutenant Aleda E. Lutz and fifteen wounded of whom some were German prisoners. There were no survivors. It took several hours for help to arrive. The crash occurred in the hollow of La Botte not far from La Jasserie, where a monument was raised in 2002 commemorating the accident.

== Administration ==
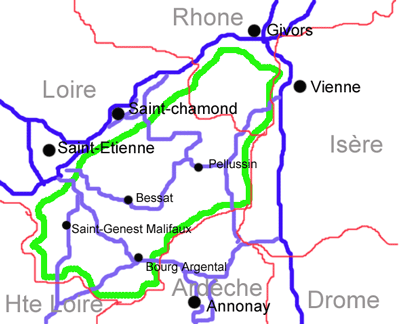
Map of the Pilat massif

The Pilat is mostly located in the Loire department southeast of the city of Saint-Étienne and southwest of the cities of Vienne and Givors. The massif is bordered by the departments of Rhône, Isère, Ardèche and Haute-Loire.

The communes of the Communauté de communes des Monts du Pilat are Bourg-Argental, Burdignes, Colombier, Graix, Jonzieux, La Versanne, Le Bessat, Marlhes, Planfoy, Saint-Genest-Malifaux, Saint-Julien-Molin-Molette, Saint-Régis-du-Coin, Saint-Romain-les-Atheux, Saint-Sauveur-en-Rue, Tarentaise and Thélis-la-Combe.

== Attractions ==
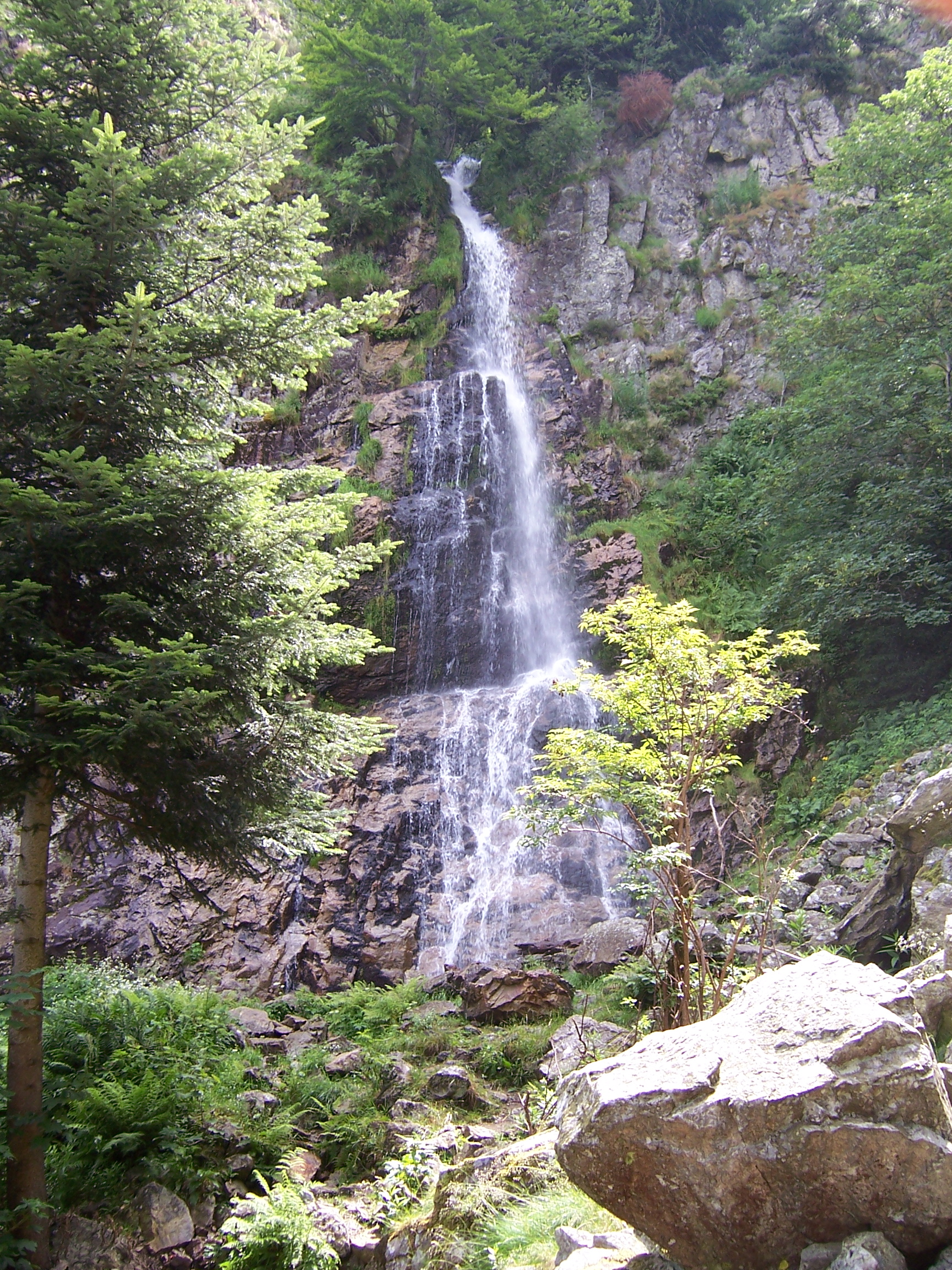
Le saut du Gier waterfall on the Gier

Sainte-Croix-en-Jarez lies in northern Pilat. Once it was a fortified 13th century monastery, but after the French Revolution it became a village. The high country around the Crêt de la Perdrix and the Crêt de l'Œillon is popular for cross-country skiing in the winter. The region is attractive to motorcyclists, with winding roads leading through bright valleys and deep forests, and with magnificent views of the Alps and the Massif Central.

The Saut du Gier waterfall near the head of the Gier is in the Pilat Regional Natural Park. It is a trickle in the summer, but a waterfall in autumn and spring.

The Pierre des Trois évêques (Three Bishops' Stone) is in the commune of Saint-Régis-du-Coin. It marked the meeting point of three provinces of Roman Gaul: Lyon, Narbonne and Aquitaine. Under Charlemagne the stone marked the point where Aquitaine, Provence and Burgundy met, and was used as a reference point during the partition of the empire in 843 AD. In the Middle Ages it delineated the Archdioceses of Lyon, Vienne and Le Puy.

The Pierre Saint-Martin (Saint Martin's Stone) is located near Mont Chaussitre. According to legend, Saint Martin of Tours left his mark here when he moved. Since then, according to local belief, the stone would be able to help young children to walk.

== Gallery ==
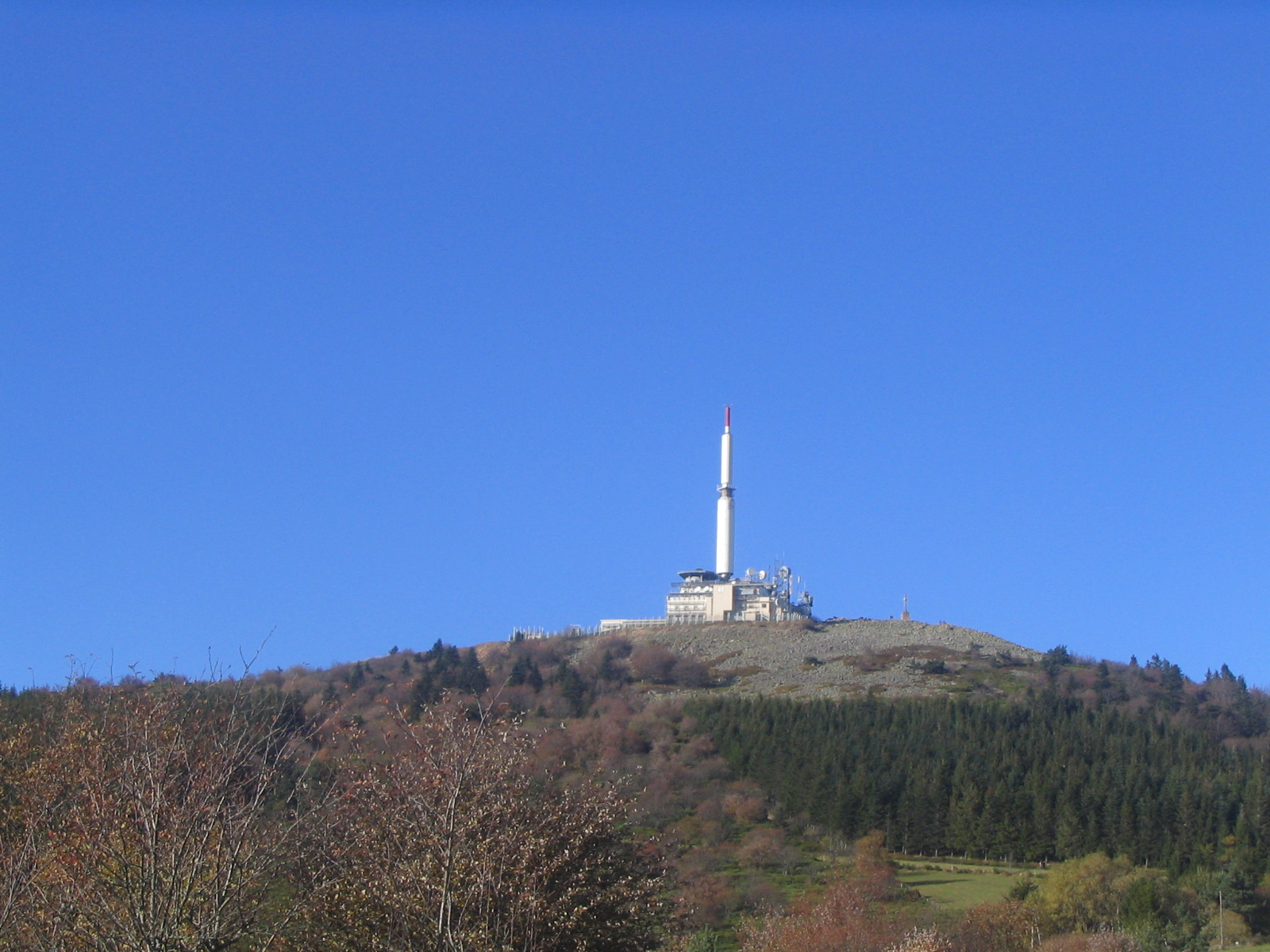
Crêt de l'Oeillon with the France Info antenna

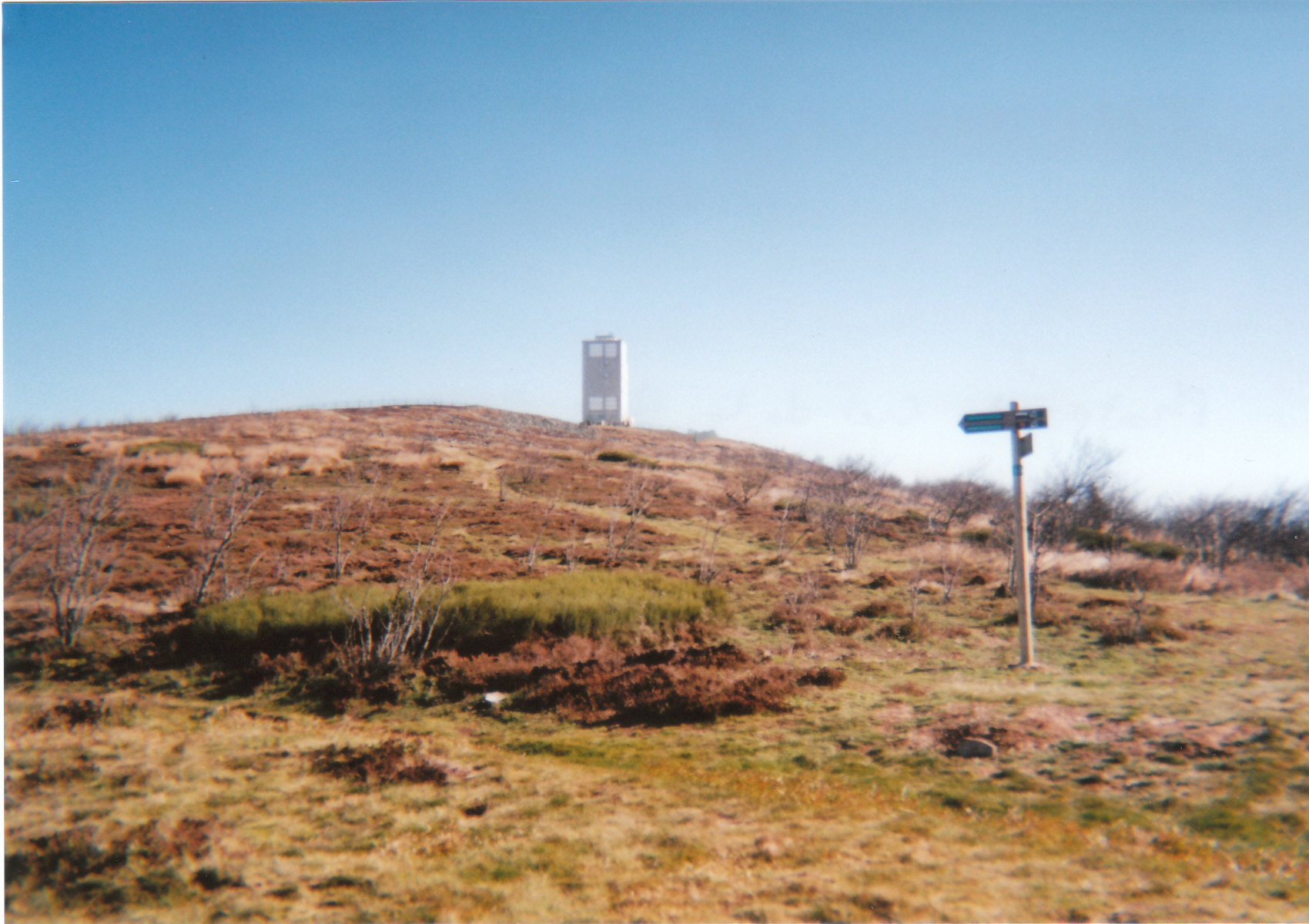
Crêt de la Bote

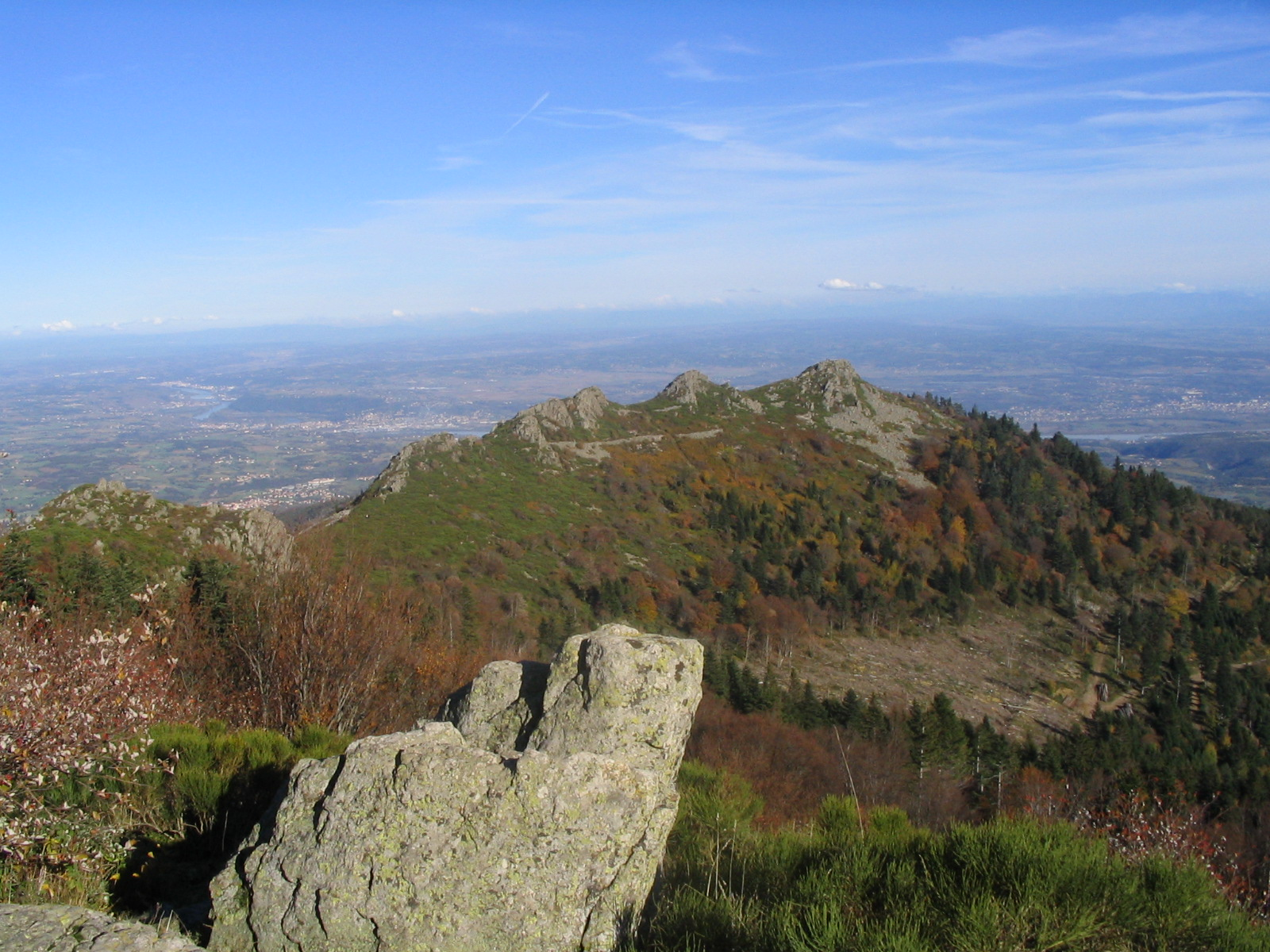
Les trois dents (the three teeth)

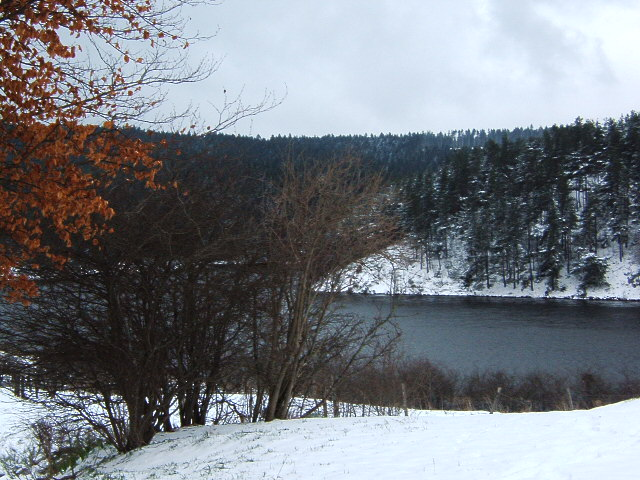
Lake Saint-Genest-Malifaux on the River Semene in winter

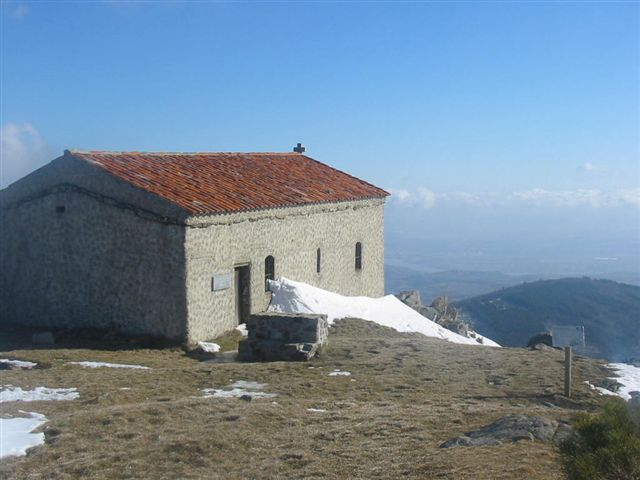
Chapelle de Saint-Sabin above the village of Véranne

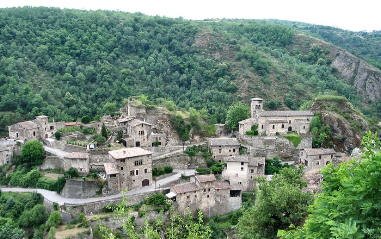
Village of Malleval
