= Arrondissement of Saint-Étienne =

Coordinates: 45°26′02″N 4°23′10″E

Saint-Étienne
- Arrondissement
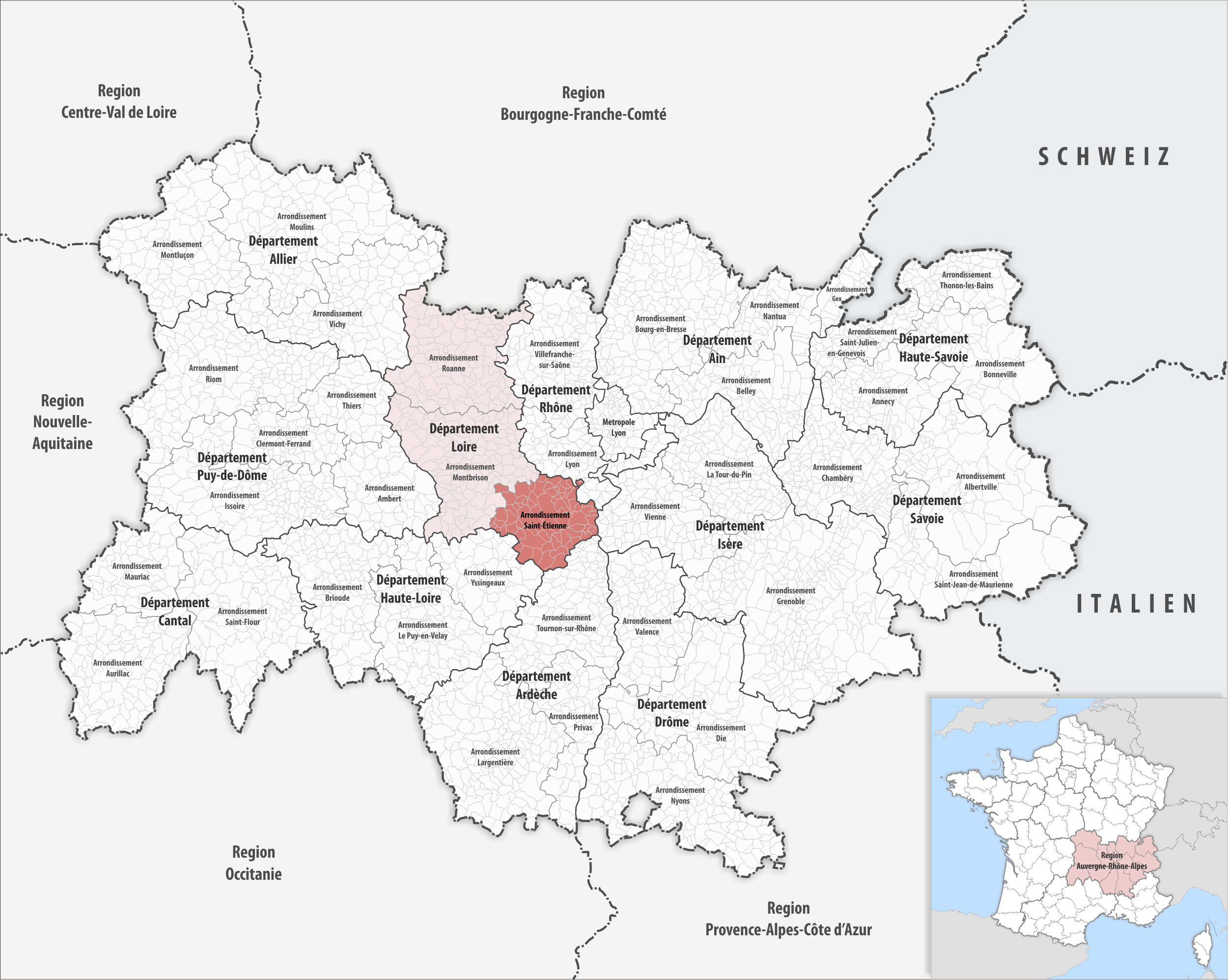
- Location within the region Auvergne-Rhône-Alpes
- Country: France
- Region: Auvergne-Rhône-Alpes
- Department: Loire
- No. of communes: {{{nbcomm}}}
- Area: 1,057.5 km^{2} (408.3 sq mi)
- Population (2023): 427,846
  - Density: 404.58/km^{2} (1,047.9/sq mi)
- INSEE code: 423

The arrondissement of Saint-Étienne is located in the Loire department in the Auvergne-Rhône-Alpes region of France. It has 75 communes. Its population is 425,495 (2021), and its area is 1,057.5 km^{2} (408.3 sq mi).

== Composition ==
The communes of the arrondissement of Saint-Étienne, and their INSEE codes, are:

1. Andrézieux-Bouthéon (42005)
2. Le Bessat (42017)
3. Bessey (42018)
4. Bourg-Argental (42023)
5. Burdignes (42028)
6. Çaloire (42031)
7. Cellieu (42032)
8. Chagnon (42036)
9. Le Chambon-Feugerolles (42044)
10. La Chapelle-Villars (42051)
11. Châteauneuf (42053)
12. Chavanay (42056)
13. Chuyer (42064)
14. Colombier (42067)
15. Dargoire (42083)
16. Doizieux (42085)
17. L'Étrat (42092)
18. Farnay (42093)
19. Firminy (42095)
20. Fontanès (42096)
21. La Fouillouse (42097)
22. Fraisses (42099)
23. Genilac (42225)
24. Graix (42101)
25. La Grand-Croix (42103)
26. L'Horme (42110)
27. Jonzieux (42115)
28. Lorette (42123)
29. Lupé (42124)
30. Maclas (42129)
31. Malleval (42132)
32. Marcenod (42133)
33. Marlhes (42139)
34. Pavezin (42167)
35. Pélussin (42168)
36. Planfoy (42172)
37. La Ricamarie (42183)
38. Rive-de-Gier (42186)
39. Roche-la-Molière (42189)
40. Roisey (42191)
41. Saint-Appolinard (42201)
42. Saint-Chamond (42207)
43. Saint-Christo-en-Jarez (42208)
44. Sainte-Croix-en-Jarez (42210)
45. Saint-Étienne (42218)
46. Saint-Genest-Lerpt (42223)
47. Saint-Genest-Malifaux (42224)
48. Saint-Héand (42234)
49. Saint-Jean-Bonnefonds (42237)
50. Saint-Joseph (42242)
51. Saint-Julien-Molin-Molette (42246)
52. Saint-Martin-la-Plaine (42259)
53. Saint-Michel-sur-Rhône (42265)
54. Saint-Paul-en-Cornillon (42270)
55. Saint-Paul-en-Jarez (42271)
56. Saint-Pierre-de-Bœuf (42272)
57. Saint-Priest-en-Jarez (42275)
58. Saint-Régis-du-Coin (42280)
59. Saint-Romain-en-Jarez (42283)
60. Saint-Romain-les-Atheux (42286)
61. Saint-Sauveur-en-Rue (42287)
62. Sorbiers (42302)
63. La Talaudière (42305)
64. Tarentaise (42306)
65. Tartaras (42307)
66. La Terrasse-sur-Dorlay (42308)
67. Thélis-la-Combe (42310)
68. La Tour-en-Jarez (42311)
69. Unieux (42316)
70. La Valla-en-Gier (42322)
71. Valfleury (42320)
72. Véranne (42326)
73. Vérin (42327)
74. La Versanne (42329)
75. Villars (42330)

== History ==
The arrondissement of Saint-Étienne was created in 1800. In January 2017 it gained the commune Andrézieux-Bouthéon from the arrondissement of Montbrison.

As a result of the reorganisation of the cantons of France which came into effect in 2015, the borders of the cantons are no longer related to the borders of the arrondissements. The cantons of the arrondissement of Saint-Étienne were, as of January 2015:

1. Bourg-Argental
2. Firminy
3. La Grand-Croix
4. Le Chambon-Feugerolles
5. Pélussin
6. Rive-de-Gier
7. Saint-Chamond-Nord
8. Saint-Chamond-Sud
9. Saint-Étienne-Nord-Est-1
10. Saint-Étienne-Nord-Est-2
11. Saint-Étienne-Nord-Ouest-1
12. Saint-Étienne-Nord-Ouest-2
13. Saint-Étienne-Sud-Est-1
14. Saint-Étienne-Sud-Est-2
15. Saint-Étienne-Sud-Est-3
16. Saint-Étienne-Sud-Ouest-1
17. Saint-Étienne-Sud-Ouest-2
18. Saint-Genest-Malifaux
19. Saint-Héand
