= Canton of Bourg-Argental =

Coordinates: 45.3118°N 4.5623°E

Bourg-Argental
- Former canton
- Interactive map of Bourg-Argental
- Country: France
- Region: Auvergne-Rhône-Alpes
- Department: Loire
- No. of communes: {{{nbcomm}}}
- Disbanded: 2015
- Area: 146.81 km^{2} (56.68 sq mi)
- Population (2012): 6,685
  - Density: 45.54/km^{2} (117.9/sq mi)

The canton of Bourg-Argental is a French former administrative division located in the department of Loire and the Rhone-Alpes region. It was disbanded following the French canton reorganisation which came into effect in March 2015. It consisted of 8 communes, which joined the new canton of Le Pilat in 2015. It had 6,685 inhabitants (2012).

The canton comprised the following communes:

- Bourg-Argental
- Burdignes
- Colombier
- Graix
- Saint-Julien-Molin-Molette
- Saint-Sauveur-en-Rue
- Thélis-la-Combe
- La Versanne

== See also ==
- Cantons of the Loire department
