= Canton of Saint-Genest-Malifaux =

Coordinates: 45.3385°N 4.4294°E

Saint-Genest-Malifaux
- Former canton
- Interactive map of Saint-Genest-Malifaux
- Country: France
- Region: Auvergne-Rhône-Alpes
- Department: Loire
- No. of communes: {{{nbcomm}}}
- Disbanded: 2015
- Area: 159.98 km^{2} (61.77 sq mi)
- Population (2012): 8,681
  - Density: 54.26/km^{2} (140.5/sq mi)

The canton of Saint-Genest-Malifaux is a French former administrative division located in the department of Loire and the Rhône-Alpes region. It was disbanded following the French canton reorganisation which came into effect in March 2015. It consisted of 8 communes, which joined the canton of Le Pilat in 2015. It had 8,681 inhabitants (2012).

The canton comprised the following communes:

- Le Bessat
- Jonzieux
- Marlhes
- Planfoy
- Saint-Genest-Malifaux
- Saint-Régis-du-Coin
- Saint-Romain-les-Atheux
- Tarentaise

== See also ==
- Cantons of the Loire department
