= Furan (river) =

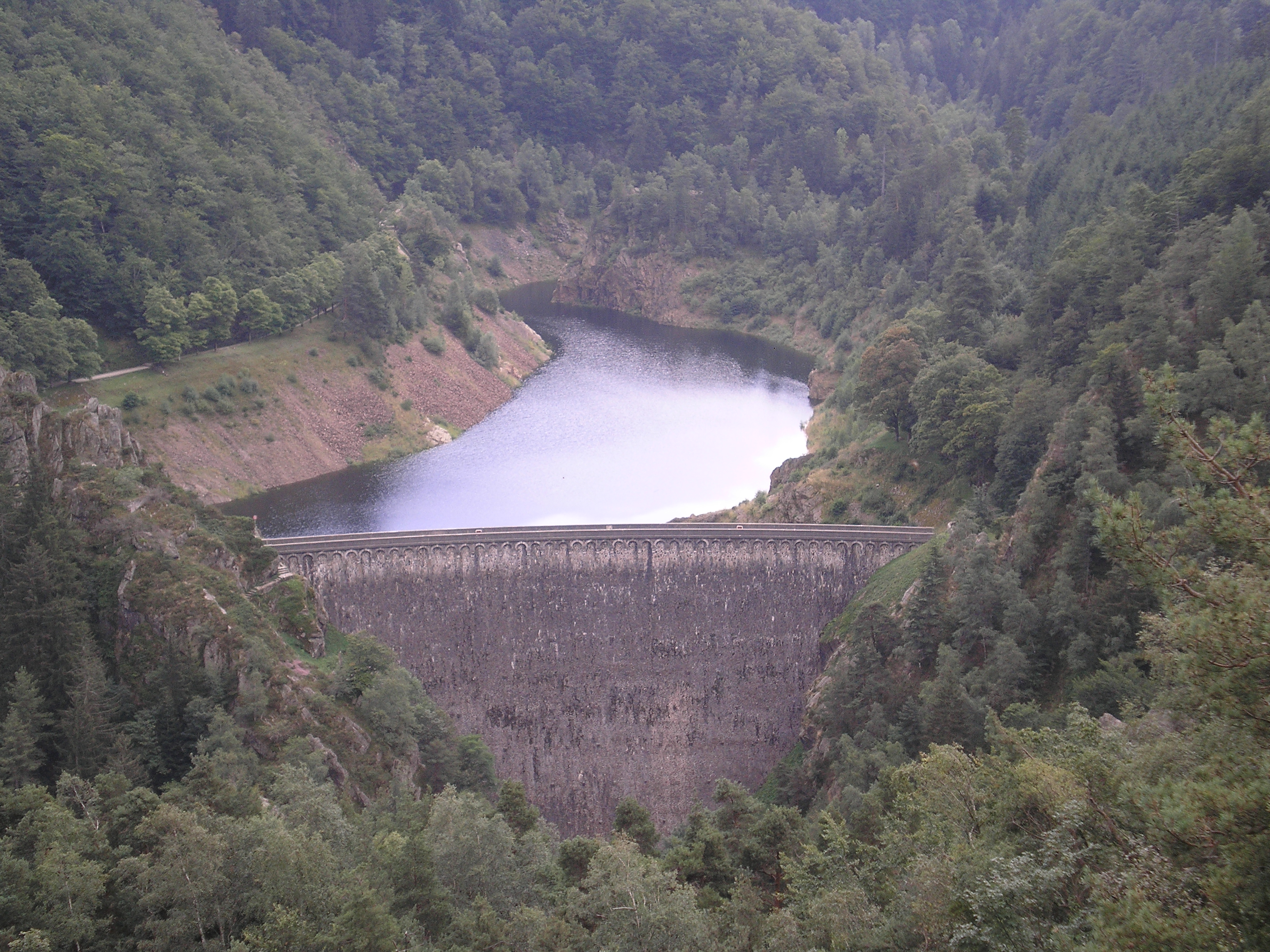

- Location within France Location within Auvergne-Rhône-Alpes

Location
- Country: France

Physical characteristics
- Source
  - location: Massif Central
- Mouth
  - location: Loire
  - coordinates: 45°31′29″N 4°14′59″E
- Length: 39.3 km (24.4 mi)

Basin features
- Progression: Loire→ Atlantic Ocean

Furan (also written as: Furens) is a 39.3 km long river in central France (Loire department), right tributary of the river Loire. It flows through the city Saint-Étienne and flows into the Loire in the small town Andrézieux-Bouthéon.

Towns along the river include:

- Le Bessat
- Tarentaise
- Saint-Étienne
- La Fouillouse
- Andrézieux-Bouthéon
