= Malleval =

Malleval may refer to:

- Malleval was until 2005 the name of Malleval-en-Vercors, in the Isère department, France
- Malleval, Loire, France
- Denis Malleval, Film director from France
