= Pavezin =

Commune in Auvergne-Rhône-Alpes, France

- Commune
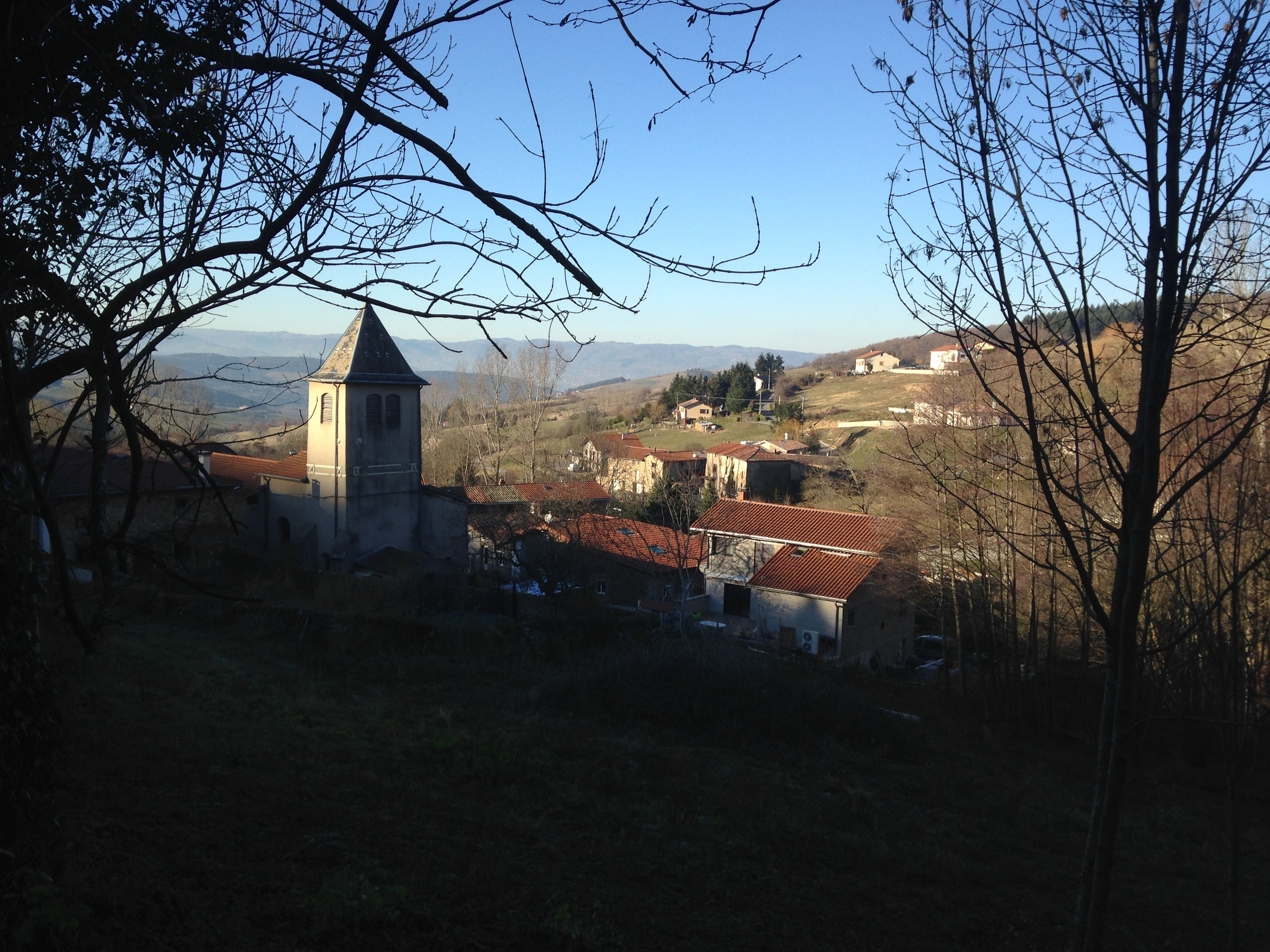

- Coat of arms
- Location of Pavezin
- Location within France Location within Auvergne-Rhône-Alpes
- Coordinates: 45°27′59″N 4°40′18″E
- Country: France
- Region: Auvergne-Rhône-Alpes
- Department: Loire
- Arrondissement: Saint-Étienne
- Canton: Le Pilat
- Intercommunality: Saint-Étienne Métropole

Government
  - Mayor (2020–2026): Yves Lecocq
- Area^{1}: 8.87 km^{2} (3.42 sq mi)
- Elevation: 610 m (2,000 ft)
- Highest elevation: 955 m (3,133 ft)
- Lowest elevation: 436 m (1,430 ft)
- Population (2023): 400
  - Density: 45/km^{2} (120/sq mi)
- Time zone: UTC+01:00 (CET)
  - Summer (DST): UTC+02:00 (CEST)
- INSEE/Postal code: 42167 /42410
- ^{1} French Land Register data, which excludes lakes, ponds, glaciers > 1 km^{2} (0.386 sq mi or 247 acres) and river estuaries.

Pavezin (French pronunciation: [pavzɛ̃]) is a commune in the Loire department in the Auvergne-Rhône-Alpes region.

== Geography ==
The village is at the top of the Couzon Valley, on the northern slope of the Pilat massif, just before the pass of the same name (652 meters above sea level).

The town is located 40 km from Saint-Etienne.

== Population ==
Historical population
Year	Pop.	±% p.a.
1968	175	—
1975	150	−2.18%
1982	183	+2.88%
1990	245	+3.71%
1999	260	+0.66%
2007	267	+0.33%
2012	360	+6.16%
2017	354	−0.34%
2023	400	+2.06%
Source: INSEE

== See also ==
- Communes of the Loire department
