= La Chapelle-Villars =

- Commune
- Coat of arms
- Location of La Chapelle-Villars
- Location within France Location within Auvergne-Rhône-Alpes
- Coordinates: 45°28′24″N 4°43′02″E
- Country: France
- Region: Auvergne-Rhône-Alpes
- Department: Loire
- Arrondissement: Saint-Étienne
- Canton: Le Pilat
- Intercommunality: Pilat Rhodanien

Government
  - Mayor (2020–2026): Jacques Berlioz
- Area^{1}: 8.25 km^{2} (3.19 sq mi)
- Elevation: 440 m (1,440 ft)
- Highest elevation: 785 m (2,575 ft)
- Lowest elevation: 318 m (1,043 ft)
- Population (2023): 528
  - Density: 64.0/km^{2} (166/sq mi)
- Time zone: UTC+01:00 (CET)
  - Summer (DST): UTC+02:00 (CEST)
- INSEE/Postal code: 42051 /42410
- ^{1} French Land Register data, which excludes lakes, ponds, glaciers > 1 km^{2} (0.386 sq mi or 247 acres) and river estuaries.

La Chapelle-Villars (French pronunciation: [la ʃapɛl vilaʁ]) is a commune in the Loire department in central France. It is part of the Parc naturel régional du Pilat. It is also home to the mountain, Mont Ministre.

== Population ==
Historical population
Year	Pop.	±% p.a.
1968	209	—
1975	227	+1.19%
1982	223	−0.25%
1990	262	+2.04%
1999	333	+2.70%
2007	533	+6.06%
2012	543	+0.37%
2017	530	−0.48%
2023	528	−0.06%
Source: INSEE

== See also ==
- Communes of the Loire department
