= Maclas =

- Commune
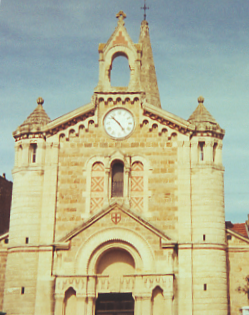

- Coat of arms
- Location of Maclas
- Location within France Location within Auvergne-Rhône-Alpes
- Coordinates: 45°21′47″N 4°41′07″E
- Country: France
- Region: Auvergne-Rhône-Alpes
- Department: Loire
- Arrondissement: Saint-Étienne
- Canton: Le Pilat
- Intercommunality: Pilat rhodanien

Government
  - Mayor (2020–2026): Hervé Blanc
- Area^{1}: 10.15 km^{2} (3.92 sq mi)
- Elevation: 400 m (1,300 ft)
- Highest elevation: 453 m (1,486 ft)
- Lowest elevation: 256 m (840 ft)
- Population (2023): 1,868
  - Density: 184.0/km^{2} (476.7/sq mi)
- Time zone: UTC+01:00 (CET)
  - Summer (DST): UTC+02:00 (CEST)
- INSEE/Postal code: 42129 /42520
- ^{1} French Land Register data, which excludes lakes, ponds, glaciers > 1 km^{2} (0.386 sq mi or 247 acres) and river estuaries.

Maclas is a commune in the Loire department in central France.

Maclas is located near the villages of Véranne and Saint-Appolinard, approximately 50 kilometres south of Lyon. It is located in the Pilat mountain range and its main industries are farming and local industry.

== Population ==
Historical population
| Year | Pop. | ±% p.a. |
|---|---|---|
| 1968 | 1,111 | — |
| 1975 | 1,120 | +0.12% |
| 1982 | 1,137 | +0.22% |
| 1990 | 1,289 | +1.58% |
| 1999 | 1,306 | +0.15% |
| 2007 | 1,584 | +2.44% |
| 2012 | 1,740 | +1.90% |
| 2017 | 1,804 | +0.73% |
| 2023 | 1,868 | +0.58% |
Source: INSEE

== See also ==
- Communes of the Loire department
