= Saint-Appolinard, Loire =

Saint-Appolinard
- Commune
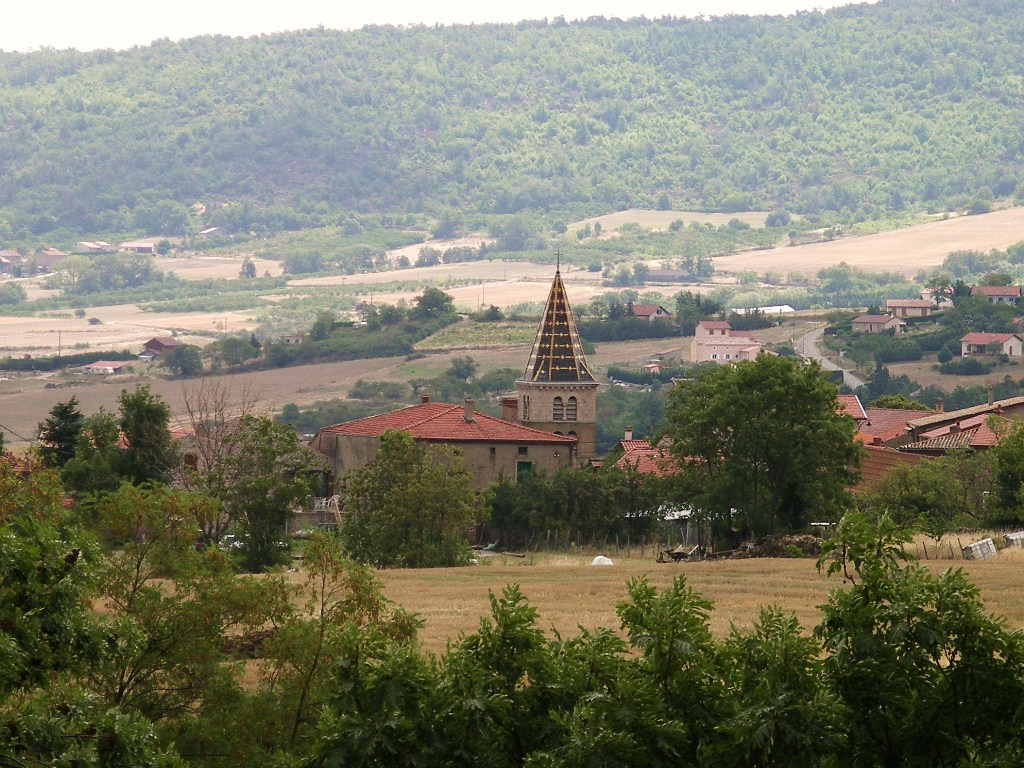
- Location of Saint-Appolinard
- Location within France Location within Auvergne-Rhône-Alpes
- Coordinates: 45°20′34″N 4°39′11″E
- Country: France
- Region: Auvergne-Rhône-Alpes
- Department: Loire
- Arrondissement: Saint-Étienne
- Canton: Le Pilat
- Intercommunality: Pilat rhodanien

Government
  - Mayor (2020–2026): Annick Flacher
- Area^{1}: 9.84 km^{2} (3.80 sq mi)
- Elevation: 480 m (1,570 ft)
- Highest elevation: 1,060 m (3,480 ft)
- Lowest elevation: 368 m (1,207 ft)
- Population (2023): 704
  - Density: 71.5/km^{2} (185/sq mi)
- Time zone: UTC+01:00 (CET)
  - Summer (DST): UTC+02:00 (CEST)
- INSEE/Postal code: 42201 /42520
- ^{1} French Land Register data, which excludes lakes, ponds, glaciers > 1 km^{2} (0.386 sq mi or 247 acres) and river estuaries.

Saint-Appolinard (French pronunciation: [sɛ̃.t‿apɔlinaʁ]) is a commune in the Loire department in central France.

== Population ==
Historical population
Year	Pop.	±% p.a.
1968	352	—
1975	338	−0.58%
1982	370	+1.30%
1990	427	+1.81%
1999	526	+2.34%
2007	603	+1.72%
2012	617	+0.46%
2017	678	+1.90%
2023	704	+0.63%
Source: INSEE

== See also ==
- Communes of the Loire department
