= Canton of Saint-Étienne-Sud-Ouest-1 =

Saint-Étienne-Sud-Ouest-1
- Former canton
- Country: France
- Region: Auvergne-Rhône-Alpes
- Department: Loire
- No. of communes: {{{nbcomm}}}
- Disbanded: 2015
- Population (2012): 14,270

The canton of Saint-Étienne-Sud-Ouest-1 is a French former administrative division located in the department of Loire and the Rhône-Alpes region. It was disbanded following the French canton reorganisation which came into effect in March 2015. It had 14,270 inhabitants (2012). The canton comprised part of the commune of Saint-Étienne.

== See also ==
- Cantons of the Loire department
