= Saint-Sauveur-en-Rue =

- Commune
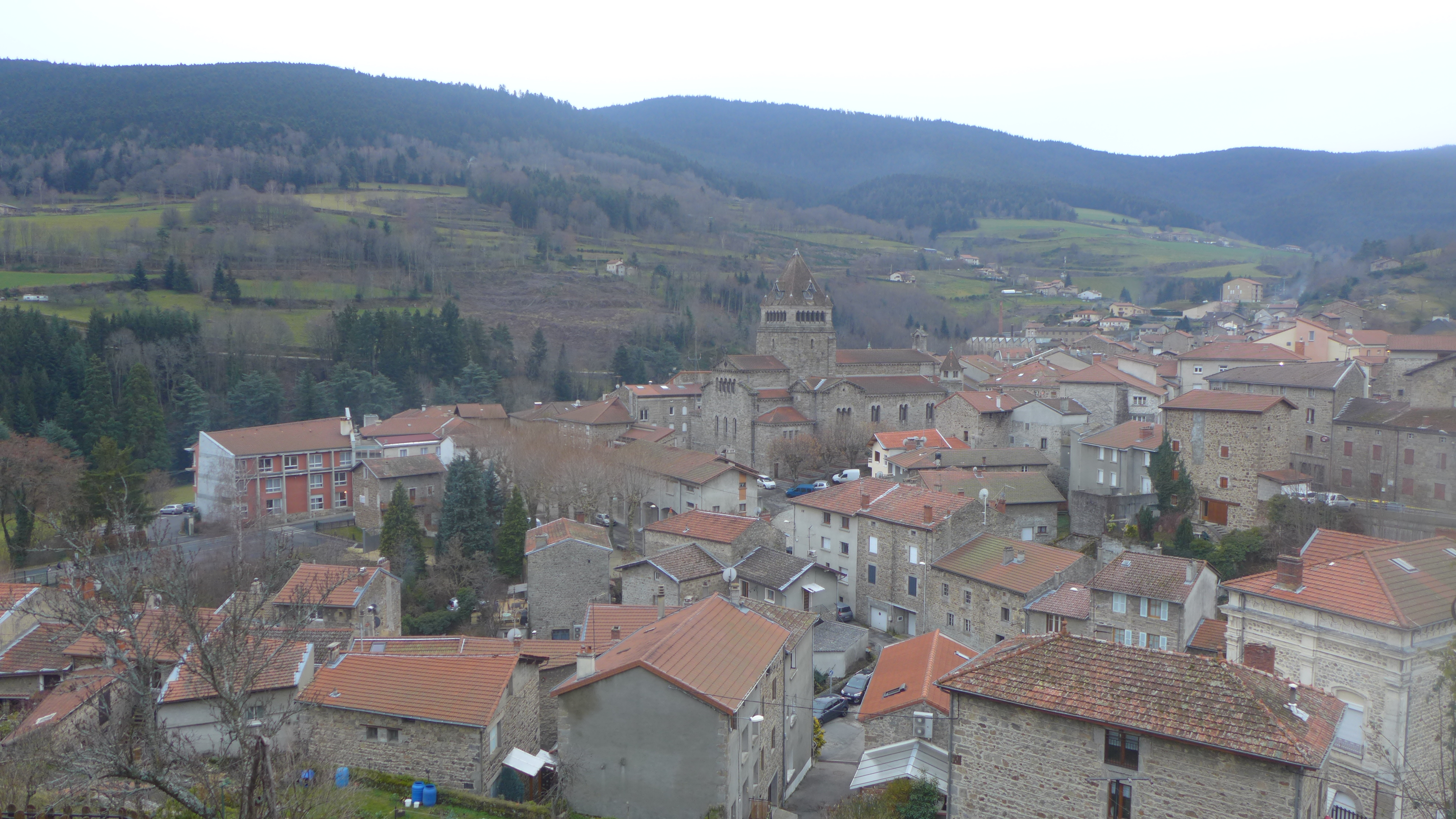
- Location of Saint-Sauveur-en-Rue
- Location within France Location within Auvergne-Rhône-Alpes
- Coordinates: 45°16′14″N 4°29′45″E
- Country: France
- Region: Auvergne-Rhône-Alpes
- Department: Loire
- Arrondissement: Saint-Étienne
- Canton: Le Pilat
- Intercommunality: Monts du Pilat

Government
  - Mayor (2020–2026): Robert Corvaisier
- Area^{1}: 30.26 km^{2} (11.68 sq mi)
- Elevation: 730 m (2,400 ft)
- Highest elevation: 1,359 m (4,459 ft)
- Lowest elevation: 600 m (2,000 ft)
- Population (2023): 1,081
  - Density: 35.72/km^{2} (92.52/sq mi)
- Time zone: UTC+01:00 (CET)
  - Summer (DST): UTC+02:00 (CEST)
- INSEE/Postal code: 42287 /42220
- ^{1} French Land Register data, which excludes lakes, ponds, glaciers > 1 km^{2} (0.386 sq mi or 247 acres) and river estuaries.

Saint-Sauveur-en-Rue (French pronunciation: [sɛ̃ sovœʁ ɑ̃ ʁy]) is a commune in the Loire department in central France.

== Geography ==
Saint-Sauveur-en-Rue is located south of the Parc Naturel Régional du Pilat. It is the southernmost town of the département of the Loire. Saint Sauveur is located 6 km (3.7 mi) from the Haute-Loire département, and 10 km (6.2 mi) from the Ardèche.

The village is situated at the foot of Mont Pyfarat, culminating at 1381m above sea level, and is located on the outskirts of the forest of Taillard. The village is situated at the foot of two well-known mountain passes: Col de la République on the road to Saint Etienne and the Col du Tracol on the road to Le Puy en Velay. The town is on the dividing line of the Loire and Rhône watersheds. The village is also near the Gimel bog. Saint Sauveur is particularly popular because it is located on the route to the Rhone Valley (which is very attractive) from the Haute-Loire and vice versa. The village is located 22 km (14 mi) from Annonay and 25 km (16 mi) south of Saint-Étienne and 48 km (30 mi) from Yssingeaux.

The Déôme river, flowing to Annonay, rises below the Tracol. Saint-Sauveur is the highest village in the valley.

== History ==
Saint-Sauveur-en-Rue is an old town which particularly flourished in the Middle Ages. Indeed, Tracol was a gateway to Puy-en-Velay for merchants from the Rhone Valley.

The suffix "Rue" in its name probably comes from the name of the nearby castle of Ru, which may be named from the Germanic word "Ruda", which means clearing. In 1061, the lord Artaud Argental bequeathed his property to the monks of La Chaise-Dieu, for them to build a priory at Saint-Sauveur-en-Rue (1062-1401). Pilat is so sparsely populated.

Saint-Sauveur had fortifications; some remain near the retirement home, a watchtower and a door above the gym.

The town is surrounded by the fortified house of Ru and Bobigneux Castle (now a hostel). In the seventeenth century, were tunnels were dug underground between the castles and churches of the canton.

The village has 35 crosses. The most important is on a rock; this is the cross of Perthuis or Ascension. This cross is the most important because the procession stopped in front of the rock as the priest blessed the participants. This cross is on the D503 at the place called Le Griotet. These crosses were built in the seventeenth century and were preserved during the French Revolution by the villagers. During the Revolution, March 16, 1794, Father Robert, vicar of Saint-Sauveur-en-Rue, refractory priest who refused to take the oath, was executed in Lyon after secretly hearing the confessions of many detainees.

Saint-Sauveur-en-Rue became prosperous in the early twentieth century by exploiting the Taillard forest to produce shoring timbers for the mines around Saint-Étienne. Saint-Sauveur-en-Rue was then connected by train (Line Saint-Rambert D'Albon - Firminy).

In the early 1970s, a seismic sensor station was built in the old railway tunnel in Badol (a hamlet east of Saint-Sauveur-en-Rue). Its importance has increased since 1993, It detected the earthquake in Chile in 2010, Japan in 2011 and Sumatra in 2004.

Today, the village is mainly a bedroom community; many people work in Saint-Étienne, the basin annonéen and the Rhône Valley. However, there are many artisans and shops. Currently, the inhabitants are called “les Picatios d’âne” from the Occitan language, a stephanois patois phrase that means "those who poke donkey butt", because it was the only way to spur donkeys forward on the grade of the Tracol.

During the Second World War, in 1944, the Allies damaged a tank with a sidewalk (now repaired). The road between the Tracol to the Cerralier cross (GR65, GR7) was made by German prisoners of war.

== Wind farm ==
As of January 2022, a wind farm project called "Ailes de Taillard" is still under development in the commune of Saint-Sauveur-en-Rue and the neighboring commune of Burdignes.

== Transport ==
The departmental road D503 passes through the village, and connects it with Riotord across the Col du Tracol, and with Bourg-Argental. The village is served by a regional bus service to Bourg-Argental.

== Population ==
Historical population
Year	Pop.	±% p.a.
1968	1,266	—
1975	1,190	−0.88%
1982	1,136	−0.66%
1990	1,053	−0.94%
1999	1,105	+0.54%
2007	1,111	+0.07%
2012	1,133	+0.39%
2017	1,095	−0.68%
2023	1,081	−0.21%
Source: INSEE

== See also ==
- Communes of the Loire department
