= Lupé =

- Commune
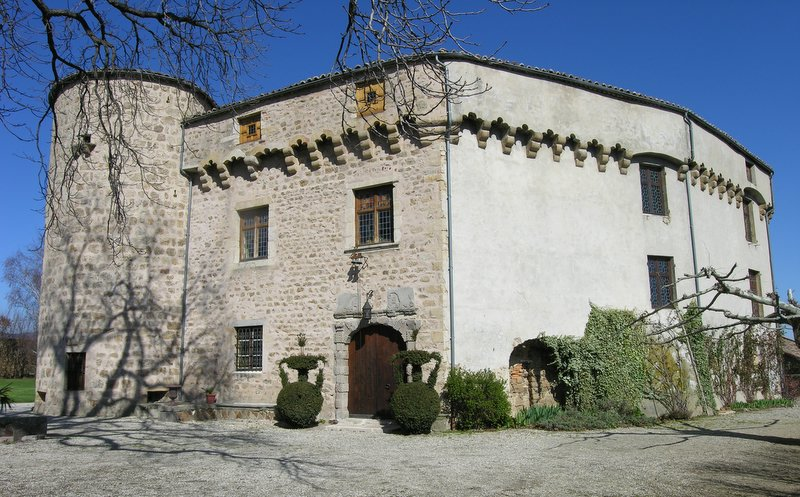
- Chateau

- Coat of arms
- Location of Lupé
- Location within France Location within Auvergne-Rhône-Alpes
- Coordinates: 45°22′24″N 4°42′18″E
- Country: France
- Region: Auvergne-Rhône-Alpes
- Department: Loire
- Arrondissement: Saint-Étienne
- Canton: Le Pilat
- Intercommunality: Pilat rhodanien

Government
  - Mayor (2020–2026): Farid Cheriet
- Area^{1}: 1.47 km^{2} (0.57 sq mi)
- Elevation: 342 m (1,122 ft)
- Highest elevation: 382 m (1,253 ft)
- Lowest elevation: 263 m (863 ft)
- Population (2023): 314
  - Density: 214/km^{2} (553/sq mi)
- Time zone: UTC+01:00 (CET)
  - Summer (DST): UTC+02:00 (CEST)
- INSEE/Postal code: 42124 /42520
- ^{1} French Land Register data, which excludes lakes, ponds, glaciers > 1 km^{2} (0.386 sq mi or 247 acres) and river estuaries.

Lupé (French pronunciation: [lype]) is a commune in the Loire department in central France.

== Population ==
Historical population
Year	Pop.	±% p.a.
1968	161	—
1975	184	+1.93%
1982	168	−1.29%
1990	208	+2.71%
1999	251	+2.11%
2007	305	+2.47%
2012	319	+0.90%
2017	307	−0.76%
2023	314	+0.38%
Source: INSEE

== See also ==
- Communes of the Loire department
