= Canton of Saint-Chamond-Sud =

Coordinates: 45.4467°N 4.5158°E

Saint-Chamond-Sud
- Former canton
- Interactive map of Saint-Chamond-Sud
- Country: France
- Region: Auvergne-Rhône-Alpes
- Department: Loire
- No. of communes: {{{nbcomm}}}
- Disbanded: 2015
- Population (2012): 19,536

The canton of Saint-Chamond-Sud is a French former administrative division located in the department of Loire and the Rhône-Alpes region. It was disbanded following the French canton reorganisation which came into effect in March 2015. It had 19,536 inhabitants (2012).

== Communes ==
The canton comprised the following communes:

- Saint-Chamond (partly)
- La Valla-en-Gier

== See also ==
- Cantons of the Loire department
