= Saint-Michel-sur-Rhône =

- Commune
- Location of Saint-Michel-sur-Rhône
- Location within France Location within Auvergne-Rhône-Alpes
- Coordinates: 45°26′49″N 4°44′43″E
- Country: France
- Region: Auvergne-Rhône-Alpes
- Department: Loire
- Arrondissement: Saint-Étienne
- Canton: Le Pilat
- Intercommunality: Pilat rhodanien

Government
  - Mayor (2020–2026): Jean-Louis Poletti
- Area^{1}: 5.87 km^{2} (2.27 sq mi)
- Elevation: 240 m (790 ft)
- Highest elevation: 436 m (1,430 ft)
- Lowest elevation: 140 m (460 ft)
- Population (2023): 888
  - Density: 151/km^{2} (392/sq mi)
- Time zone: UTC+01:00 (CET)
  - Summer (DST): UTC+02:00 (CEST)
- INSEE/Postal code: 42265 /42410
- ^{1} French Land Register data, which excludes lakes, ponds, glaciers > 1 km^{2} (0.386 sq mi or 247 acres) and river estuaries.

Saint-Michel-sur-Rhône (French pronunciation: [sɛ̃ miʃɛl syʁ ʁon], literally Saint-Michel on Rhône) is a commune in the Loire department in central France.

== Population ==
Historical population
| Year | Pop. | ±% p.a. |
|---|---|---|
| 1968 | 299 | — |
| 1975 | 344 | +2.02% |
| 1982 | 503 | +5.58% |
| 1990 | 613 | +2.50% |
| 1999 | 637 | +0.43% |
| 2007 | 746 | +1.99% |
| 2012 | 796 | +1.31% |
| 2017 | 826 | +0.74% |
| 2023 | 888 | +1.21% |
Source: INSEE

== History ==
The commune was heavily affected during the First World War, with 23 residents killed in action out of a population of 360.

During the Second World War, the "Ange" maquis resistance network was active in the commune. In late August 1944, as Nazi forces were retreating from the region, violent fighting took place within the commune, resulting in several fatalities, mainly among resistance fighters.

In addition, the parish priest, Paul Clément, who survived the war, hid two Jewish women, helping them evade persecution.

== See also ==
- Communes of the Loire department
