= Saint-Pierre-de-Bœuf =

- Commune
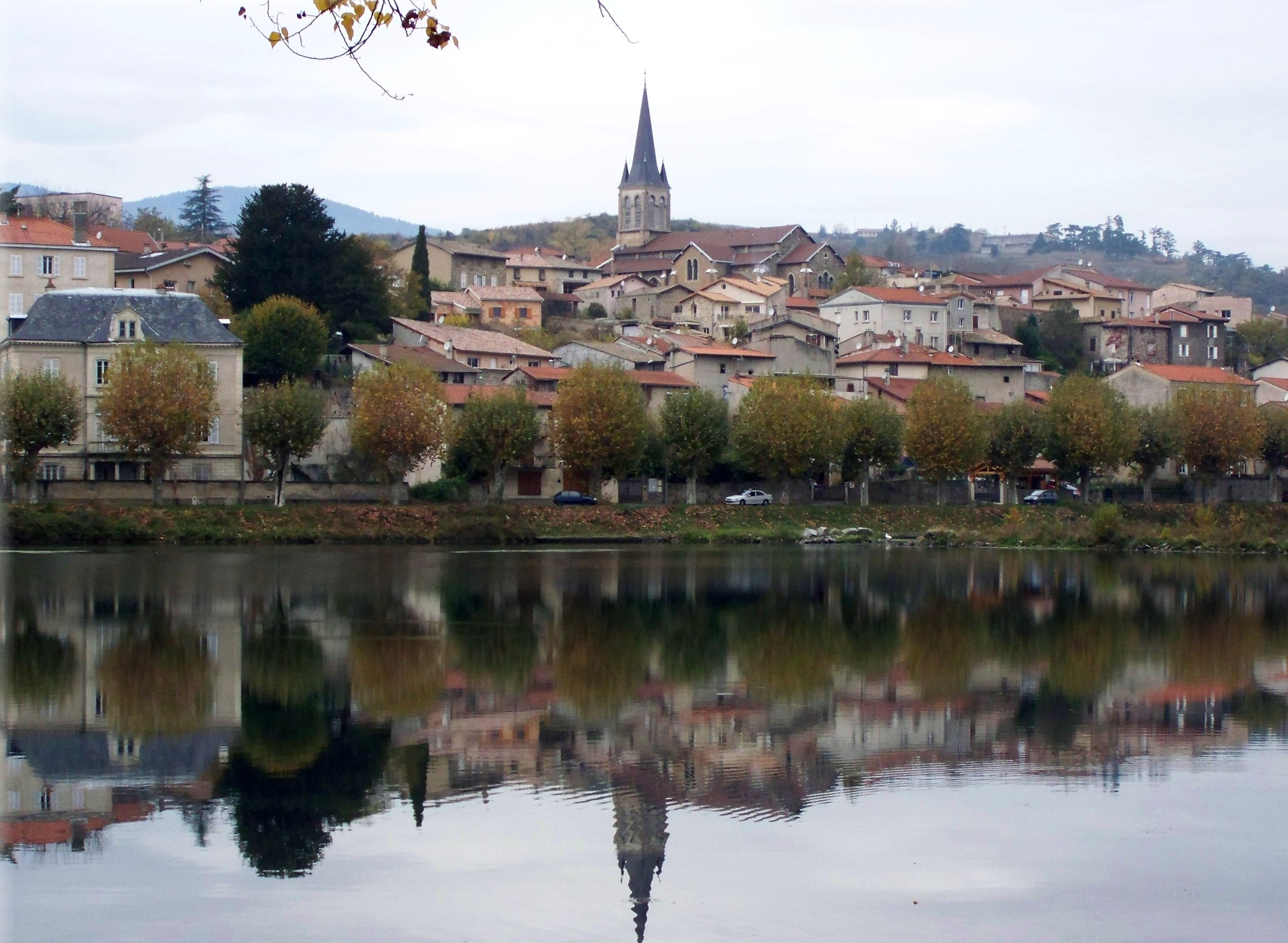

- Coat of arms
- Location of Saint-Pierre-de-Bœuf
- Location within France Location within Auvergne-Rhône-Alpes
- Coordinates: 45°23′01″N 4°45′00″E
- Country: France
- Region: Auvergne-Rhône-Alpes
- Department: Loire
- Arrondissement: Saint-Étienne
- Canton: Le Pilat
- Intercommunality: Pilat rhodanien

Government
  - Mayor (2020–2026): Serge Rault
- Area^{1}: 5.95 km^{2} (2.30 sq mi)
- Elevation: 140 m (460 ft)
- Highest elevation: 445 m (1,460 ft)
- Lowest elevation: 130 m (430 ft)
- Population (2023): 1,712
  - Density: 288/km^{2} (745/sq mi)
- Time zone: UTC+01:00 (CET)
  - Summer (DST): UTC+02:00 (CEST)
- INSEE/Postal code: 42272 /42520
- ^{1} French Land Register data, which excludes lakes, ponds, glaciers > 1 km^{2} (0.386 sq mi or 247 acres) and river estuaries.

Saint-Pierre-de-Bœuf (French pronunciation: [sɛ̃ pjɛʁ də bœf]) is a commune in the Loire department in central France.

== Population ==
Historical population
Year	Pop.	±% p.a.
1968	1,026	—
1975	1,114	+1.18%
1982	1,051	−0.83%
1990	1,174	+1.39%
1999	1,306	+1.19%
2007	1,564	+2.28%
2012	1,683	+1.48%
2017	1,726	+0.51%
2023	1,712	−0.14%
Source: INSEE

== See also ==
- Communes of the Loire department
