= Vérin =

- Commune
- Coat of arms
- Location of Vérin
- Location within France Location within Auvergne-Rhône-Alpes
- Coordinates: 45°27′18″N 4°45′12″E
- Country: France
- Region: Auvergne-Rhône-Alpes
- Department: Loire
- Arrondissement: Saint-Étienne
- Canton: Le Pilat
- Intercommunality: Pilat rhodanien

Government
  - Mayor (2020–2026): Valérie Peysselon
- Area^{1}: 3.05 km^{2} (1.18 sq mi)
- Elevation: 150 m (490 ft)
- Highest elevation: 369 m (1,211 ft)
- Lowest elevation: 143 m (469 ft)
- Population (2023): 666
  - Density: 218/km^{2} (566/sq mi)
- Time zone: UTC+01:00 (CET)
  - Summer (DST): UTC+02:00 (CEST)
- INSEE/Postal code: 42327 /42410
- ^{1} French Land Register data, which excludes lakes, ponds, glaciers > 1 km^{2} (0.386 sq mi or 247 acres) and river estuaries.

Vérin (French pronunciation: [veʁɛ̃]) is a commune in the Loire department in central France.

== Population ==
Historical population
Year	Pop.	±% p.a.
1968	404	—
1975	411	+0.25%
1982	435	+0.81%
1990	512	+2.06%
1999	577	+1.34%
2007	714	+2.70%
2012	686	−0.80%
2017	669	−0.50%
2023	666	−0.07%
Source: INSEE

== See also ==
- Communes of the Loire department
