= Bessey =

- Commune
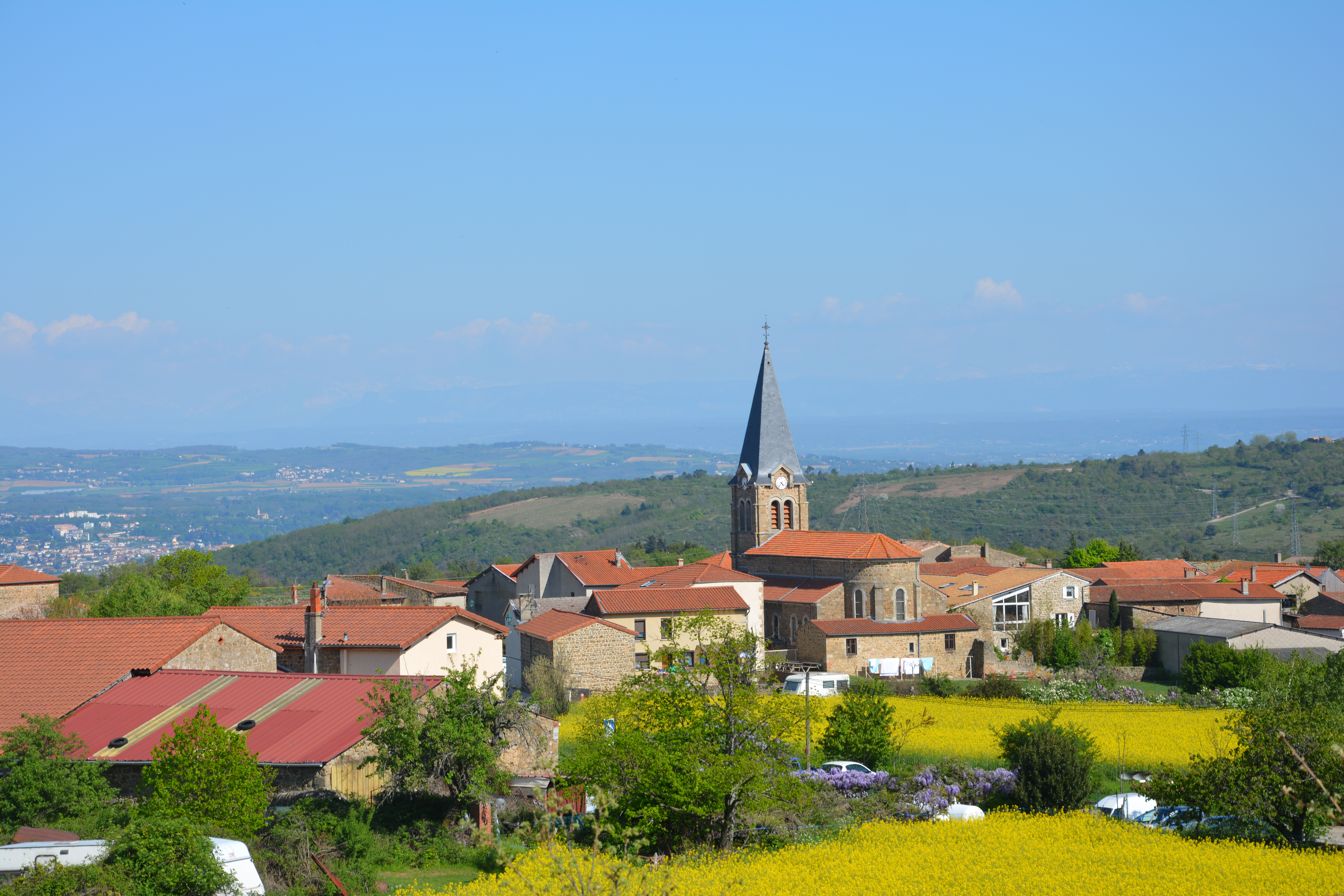
- Location of Bessey
- Location within France Location within Auvergne-Rhône-Alpes
- Coordinates: 45°23′10″N 4°41′46″E
- Country: France
- Region: Auvergne-Rhône-Alpes
- Department: Loire
- Arrondissement: Saint-Étienne
- Canton: Le Pilat
- Intercommunality: Pilat rhodanien

Government
  - Mayor (2020–2026): Charles Zilliox
- Area^{1}: 6.24 km^{2} (2.41 sq mi)
- Elevation: 320 m (1,050 ft)
- Highest elevation: 430 m (1,410 ft)
- Lowest elevation: 278 m (912 ft)
- Population (2023): 465
  - Density: 74.5/km^{2} (193/sq mi)
- Time zone: UTC+01:00 (CET)
  - Summer (DST): UTC+02:00 (CEST)
- INSEE/Postal code: 42018 /42520
- ^{1} French Land Register data, which excludes lakes, ponds, glaciers > 1 km^{2} (0.386 sq mi or 247 acres) and river estuaries.

Bessey (French pronunciation: [bɛsɛ]) is a commune in the Loire department in central France.

== Population ==
Historical population
Year	Pop.	±% p.a.
1968	229	—
1975	235	+0.37%
1982	226	−0.56%
1990	263	+1.91%
1999	292	+1.17%
2007	384	+3.48%
2012	410	+1.32%
2017	457	+2.19%
2023	465	+0.29%
Source: INSEE

== See also ==
- Communes of the Loire department
