= Chuyer =

- Commune
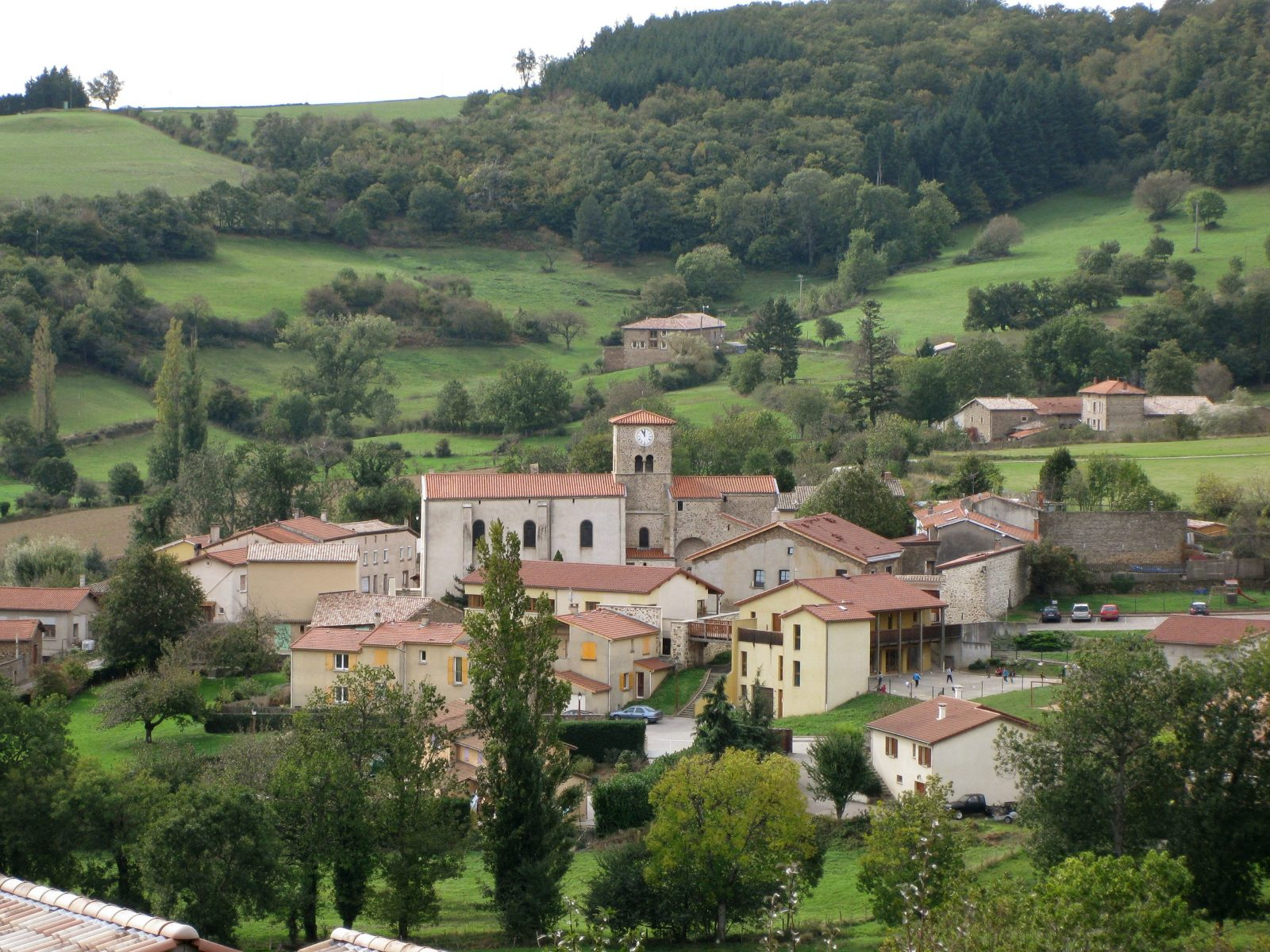
- Location of Chuyer
- Location within France Location within Auvergne-Rhône-Alpes
- Coordinates: 45°27′29″N 4°41′40″E
- Country: France
- Region: Auvergne-Rhône-Alpes
- Department: Loire
- Arrondissement: Saint-Étienne
- Canton: Le Pilat
- Intercommunality: Pilat rhodanien

Government
  - Mayor (2020–2026): Béatrice Richard
- Area^{1}: 12.06 km^{2} (4.66 sq mi)
- Elevation: 475 m (1,558 ft)
- Highest elevation: 880 m (2,890 ft)
- Lowest elevation: 319 m (1,047 ft)
- Population (2023): 759
  - Density: 62.9/km^{2} (163/sq mi)
- Time zone: UTC+01:00 (CET)
  - Summer (DST): UTC+02:00 (CEST)
- INSEE/Postal code: 42064 /42410
- ^{1} French Land Register data, which excludes lakes, ponds, glaciers > 1 km^{2} (0.386 sq mi or 247 acres) and river estuaries.

Chuyer (French pronunciation: [ʃɥije]) is a commune in the Loire department in central France. It is a relatively small village outside Pelussin (7 km away) in the Mont Pilat national park.

== Population ==
Historical population
Year	Pop.	±% p.a.
1968	383	—
1975	372	−0.42%
1982	423	+1.85%
1990	457	+0.97%
1999	587	+2.82%
2007	720	+2.59%
2012	790	+1.87%
2017	775	−0.38%
2023	759	−0.35%
Source: INSEE

== Facilities ==
Though small, there are some business's in the village including a restaurant, and bread vending machine (filled up every morning by the bakery in Pelussin) and also 200 meters from the center is the Gite de la croix du Berthoud which has views over the valley. There is also football and basketball courts 150 meters from the center of the village.

== Location ==
The village lies in the hills of the Pilat natural park and is close to the residential and commercial hub of Pelussin about 7 km away where there are shopping, garages and leisure activities. It also lies close to Condrieu Which lies on both sides of the River Rhone. It is close to the transport, commercial and leisure hub of Vienne where there is a train station, Saturday market and shops, cafe's and restaurants. One hour away is the 3rd largest city in France, Lyon a UNESCO heritage site which is known for its gastronomy.

== Activities ==
Chuyer's surroundings include the local wilderness and hills. The area's winding roads are used by cyclists with the Tour de France passing through the local roads around Chuyer. Other activities include the local adventure park with zip lines and climbing. There are views at the nearby Centre emetteur TDF which look over the valley.

== Weather ==
Chuyer has hot weather in the summer which is why many locals stay indoors between lunch and around 3 o'clock when the weather is very hot. And there are usually 2 or 3 thunder storms in the summer bringing rain much to the locals relief. And in the winter it can snow heavily but is usually a few centimeters or inches.

== See also ==
- Communes of the Loire department
