= Véranne =

- Commune
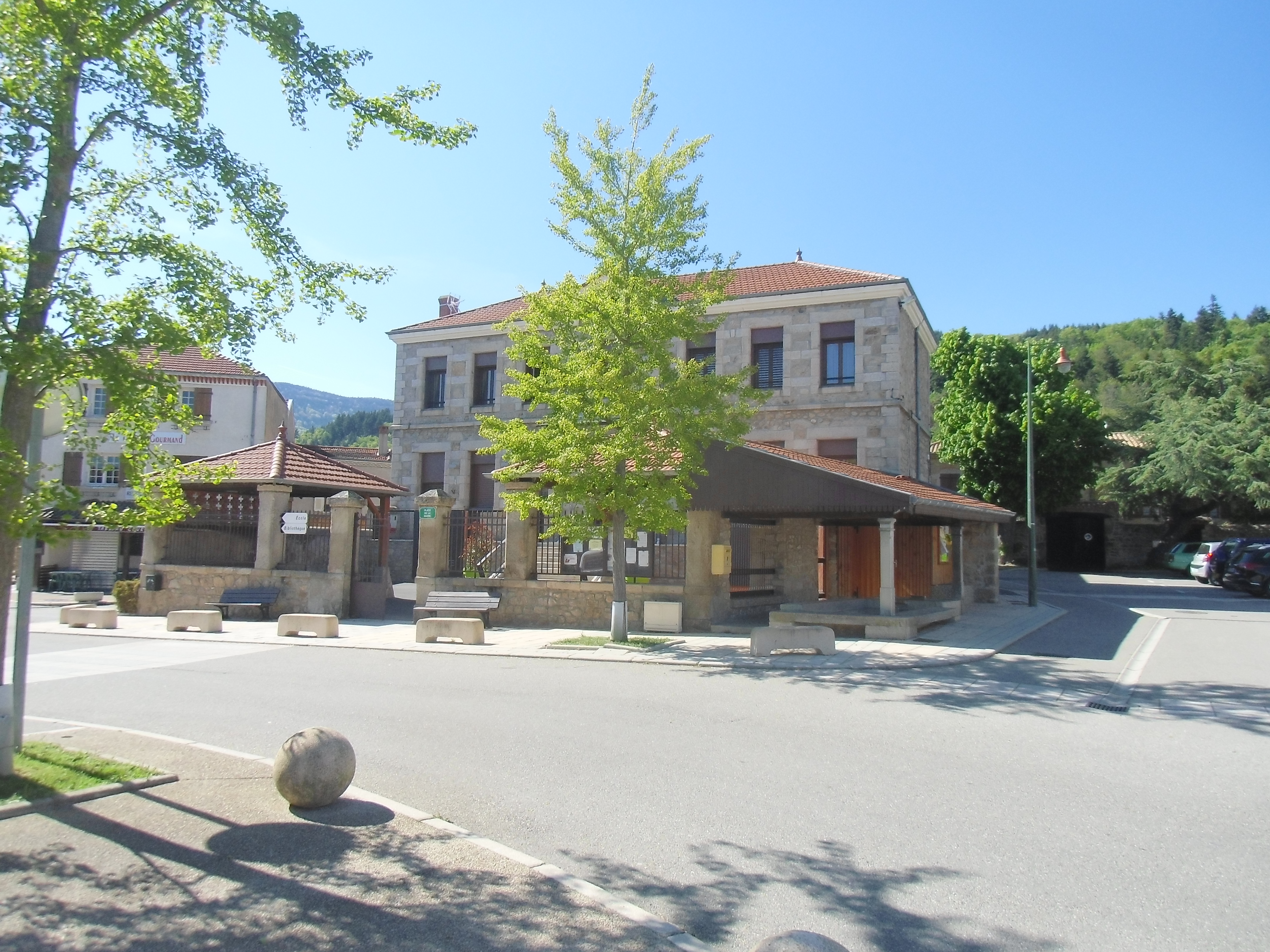
- Location of Véranne
- Location within France Location within Auvergne-Rhône-Alpes
- Coordinates: 45°22′09″N 4°39′48″E
- Country: France
- Region: Auvergne-Rhône-Alpes
- Department: Loire
- Arrondissement: Saint-Étienne
- Canton: Le Pilat
- Intercommunality: Pilat rhodanien

Government
  - Mayor (2020–2026): Michel Borel
- Area^{1}: 15.96 km^{2} (6.16 sq mi)
- Elevation: 580 m (1,900 ft)
- Highest elevation: 1,390 m (4,560 ft)
- Lowest elevation: 417 m (1,368 ft)
- Population (2023): 951
  - Density: 59.6/km^{2} (154/sq mi)
- Time zone: UTC+01:00 (CET)
  - Summer (DST): UTC+02:00 (CEST)
- INSEE/Postal code: 42326 /42520
- ^{1} French Land Register data, which excludes lakes, ponds, glaciers > 1 km^{2} (0.386 sq mi or 247 acres) and river estuaries.

Véranne (French pronunciation: [veʁan]) is a commune in the Loire department in central France.

== Population ==
Historical population
Year	Pop.	±% p.a.
1968	478	—
1975	429	−1.53%
1982	452	+0.75%
1990	506	+1.42%
1999	582	+1.57%
2007	692	+2.19%
2012	830	+3.70%
2017	835	+0.12%
2023	951	+2.19%
Source: INSEE

== See also ==
- Communes of the Loire department
