= Roisey =

- Commune
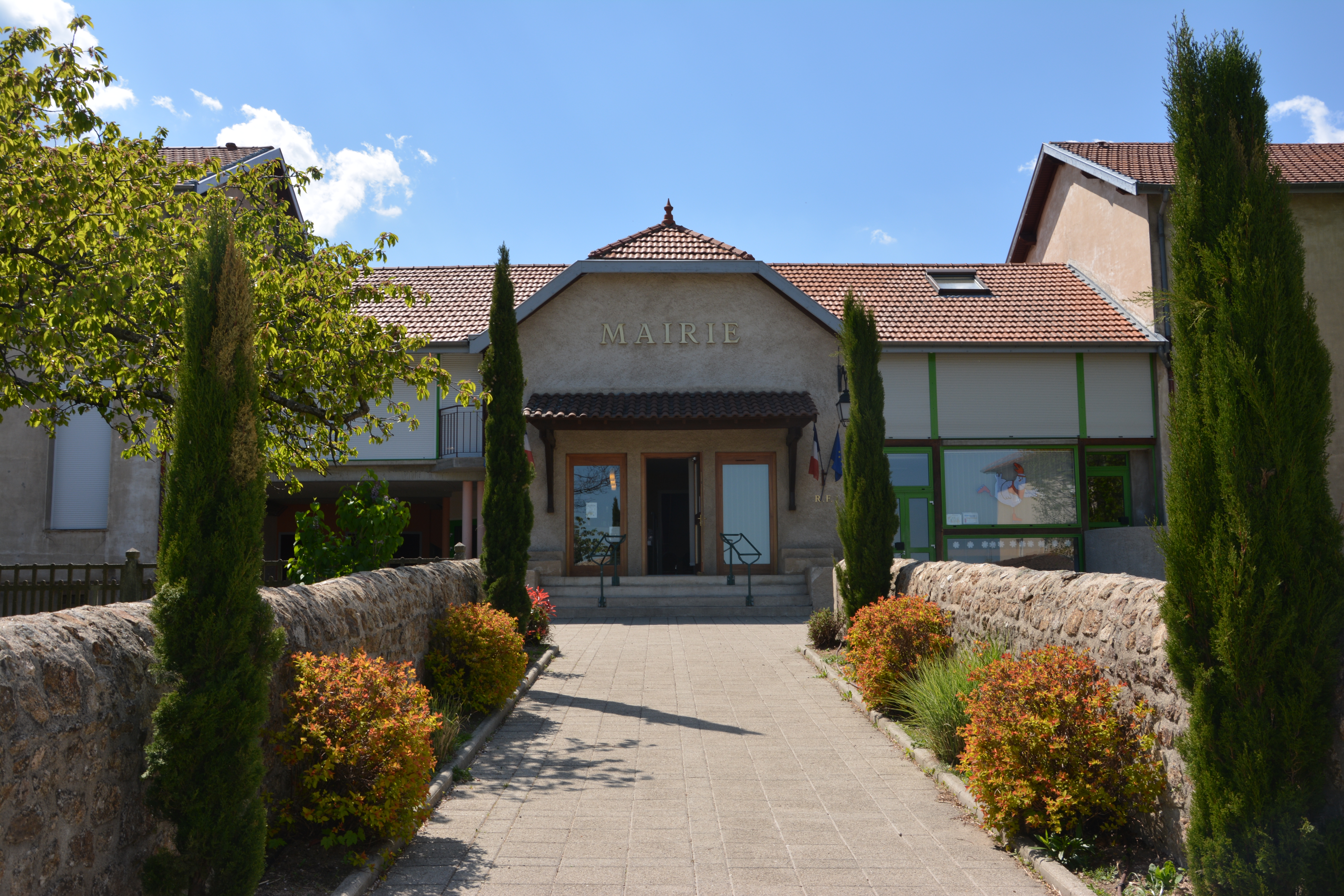
- Town hall
- Location of Roisey
- Location within France Location within Auvergne-Rhône-Alpes
- Coordinates: 45°23′18″N 4°40′22″E
- Country: France
- Region: Auvergne-Rhône-Alpes
- Department: Loire
- Arrondissement: Saint-Étienne
- Canton: Le Pilat
- Intercommunality: Pilat rhodanien

Government
  - Mayor (2020–2026): Philippe Aries
- Area^{1}: 13.03 km^{2} (5.03 sq mi)
- Elevation: 510 m (1,670 ft)
- Highest elevation: 1,343 m (4,406 ft)
- Lowest elevation: 390 m (1,280 ft)
- Population (2023): 1,014
  - Density: 77.82/km^{2} (201.6/sq mi)
- Time zone: UTC+01:00 (CET)
  - Summer (DST): UTC+02:00 (CEST)
- INSEE/Postal code: 42191 /42520
- ^{1} French Land Register data, which excludes lakes, ponds, glaciers > 1 km^{2} (0.386 sq mi or 247 acres) and river estuaries.

Roisey (French pronunciation: [ʁwazɛ]) is a commune in the Loire department in central France.

== Population ==
Historical population
| Year | Pop. | ±% p.a. |
|---|---|---|
| 1968 | 433 | — |
| 1975 | 453 | +0.65% |
| 1982 | 517 | +1.91% |
| 1990 | 626 | +2.42% |
| 1999 | 698 | +1.22% |
| 2007 | 850 | +2.49% |
| 2012 | 883 | +0.76% |
| 2017 | 936 | +1.17% |
| 2023 | 1,014 | +1.34% |
Source: INSEE

== See also ==
- Communes of the Loire department
