= Malleval, Loire =

Malleval
- Commune
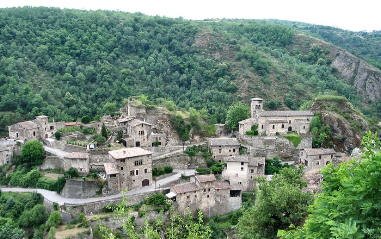
- Aerial view of Malleval

- Coat of arms
- Location of Malleval
- Location within France Location within Auvergne-Rhône-Alpes
- Coordinates: 45°23′05″N 4°43′39″E
- Country: France
- Region: Auvergne-Rhône-Alpes
- Department: Loire
- Arrondissement: Saint-Étienne
- Canton: Le Pilat
- Intercommunality: Pilat rhodanien

Government
  - Mayor (2020–2026): Christelle Marchal
- Area^{1}: 5.06 km^{2} (1.95 sq mi)
- Elevation: 210 m (690 ft)
- Highest elevation: 414 m (1,358 ft)
- Lowest elevation: 151 m (495 ft)
- Population (2023): 648
  - Density: 128/km^{2} (332/sq mi)
- Time zone: UTC+01:00 (CET)
  - Summer (DST): UTC+02:00 (CEST)
- INSEE/Postal code: 42132 /42520
- ^{1} French Land Register data, which excludes lakes, ponds, glaciers > 1 km^{2} (0.386 sq mi or 247 acres) and river estuaries.

Malleval (French pronunciation: [malval]) is a commune in the Loire department in central France.

== Population ==
Historical population
Year	Pop.	±% p.a.
1968	347	—
1975	300	−2.06%
1982	342	+1.89%
1990	427	+2.81%
1999	477	+1.24%
2007	535	+1.44%
2012	567	+1.17%
2017	578	+0.39%
2023	648	+1.92%
Source: INSEE

== See also ==
- Communes of the Loire department
