= Graix =

- Commune
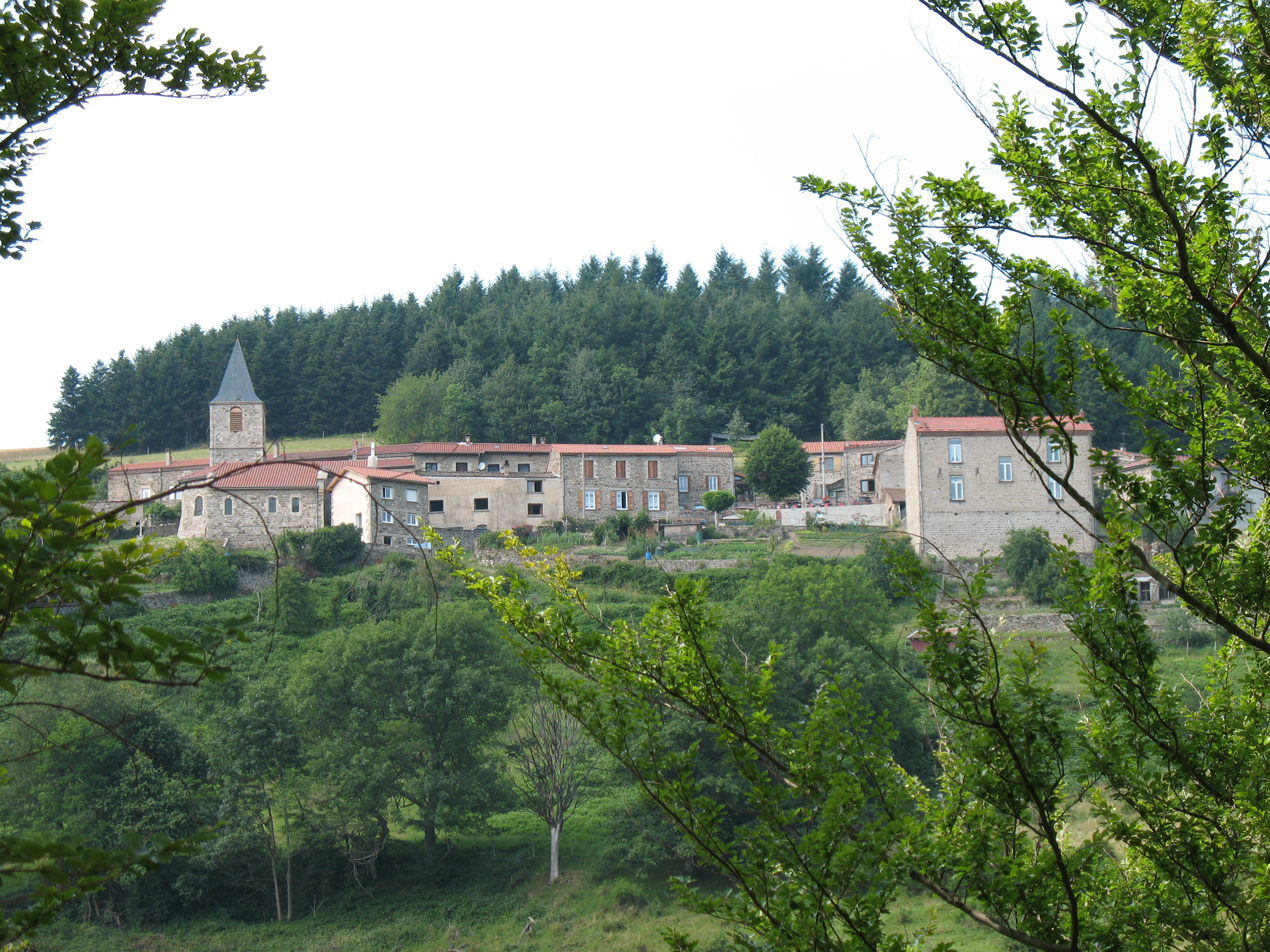
- Location of Graix
- Location within France Location within Auvergne-Rhône-Alpes
- Coordinates: 45°20′55″N 4°34′12″E
- Country: France
- Region: Auvergne-Rhône-Alpes
- Department: Loire
- Arrondissement: Saint-Étienne
- Canton: Le Pilat
- Intercommunality: Monts du Pilat

Government
  - Mayor (2023–2026): Philippe Royet
- Area^{1}: 8.58 km^{2} (3.31 sq mi)
- Elevation: 980 m (3,220 ft)
- Highest elevation: 1,431 m (4,695 ft)
- Lowest elevation: 813 m (2,667 ft)
- Population (2023): 128
  - Density: 14.9/km^{2} (38.6/sq mi)
- Time zone: UTC+01:00 (CET)
  - Summer (DST): UTC+02:00 (CEST)
- INSEE/Postal code: 42101 /42220
- ^{1} French Land Register data, which excludes lakes, ponds, glaciers > 1 km^{2} (0.386 sq mi or 247 acres) and river estuaries.

Graix is a commune in the Loire department in central France.

== Population ==
Historical population
Year	Pop.	±% p.a.
1968	138	—
1975	116	−2.45%
1982	117	+0.12%
1990	131	+1.42%
1999	134	+0.25%
2007	145	+0.99%
2012	149	+0.55%
2017	146	−0.41%
2023	128	−2.17%
Source: INSEE

== See also ==
- Communes of the Loire department
