= Burdignes =

- Commune
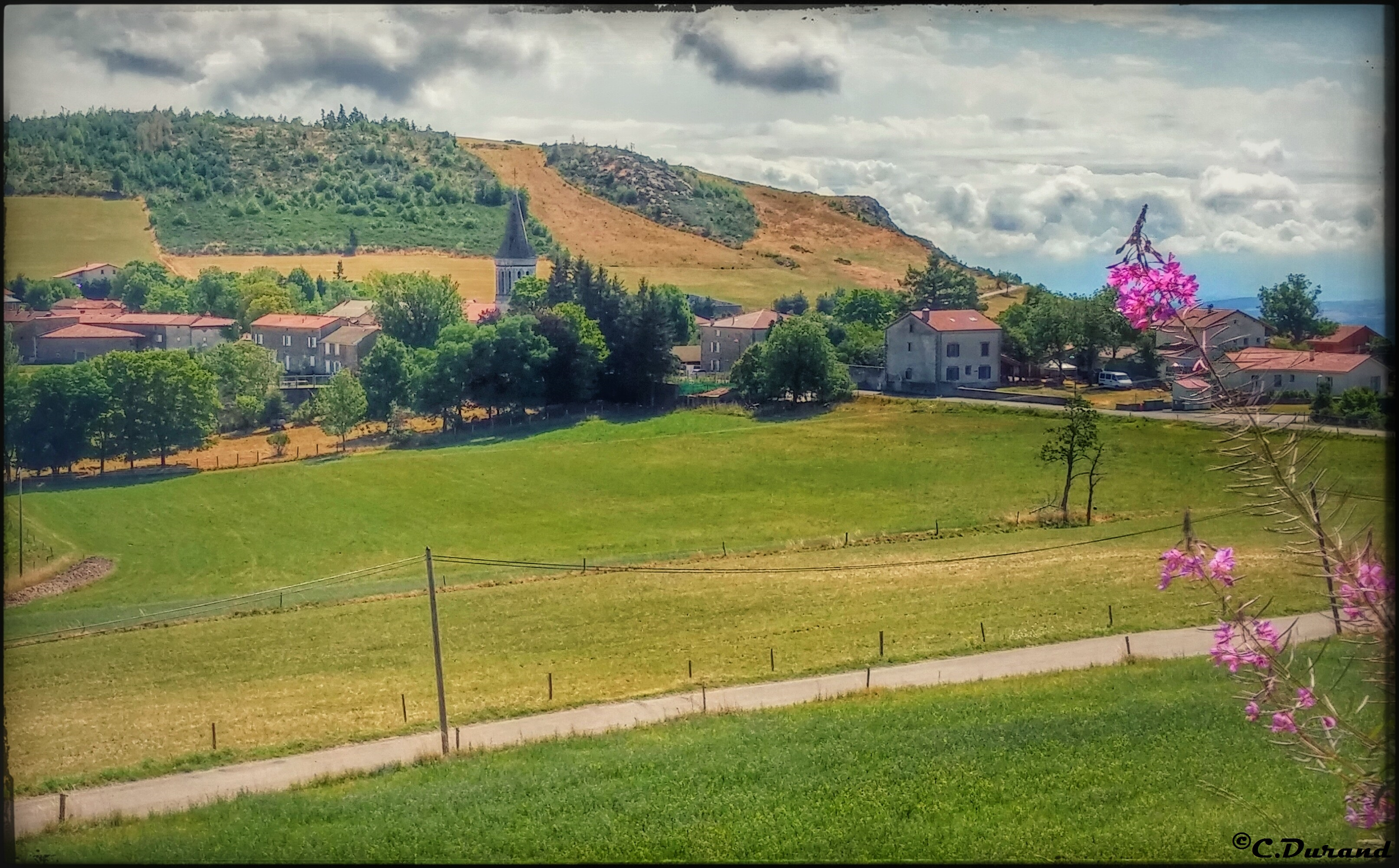
- Location of Burdignes
- Location within France Location within Auvergne-Rhône-Alpes
- Coordinates: 45°16′16″N 4°34′03″E
- Country: France
- Region: Auvergne-Rhône-Alpes
- Department: Loire
- Arrondissement: Saint-Étienne
- Canton: Le Pilat
- Intercommunality: Monts du Pilat

Government
  - Mayor (2020–2026): Philippe Heitz
- Area^{1}: 30.81 km^{2} (11.90 sq mi)
- Elevation: 910 m (2,990 ft)
- Highest elevation: 1,382 m (4,534 ft)
- Lowest elevation: 472 m (1,549 ft)
- Population (2023): 422
  - Density: 13.7/km^{2} (35.5/sq mi)
- Time zone: UTC+01:00 (CET)
  - Summer (DST): UTC+02:00 (CEST)
- INSEE/Postal code: 42028 /42220
- ^{1} French Land Register data, which excludes lakes, ponds, glaciers > 1 km^{2} (0.386 sq mi or 247 acres) and river estuaries.

Burdignes (French pronunciation: [byʁdiɲ]) is a commune in the Loire department in central France.

== Population ==
Historical population
Year	Pop.	±% p.a.
1968	422	—
1975	367	−1.98%
1982	367	+0.00%
1990	342	−0.88%
1999	342	+0.00%
2007	358	+0.57%
2012	347	−0.62%
2017	368	+1.18%
2023	422	+2.31%
Source: INSEE

== See also ==
- Communes of the Loire department
