= Jonzieux =

- Commune
- Location of Jonzieux
- Location within France Location within Auvergne-Rhône-Alpes
- Coordinates: 45°18′52″N 4°21′46″E
- Country: France
- Region: Auvergne-Rhône-Alpes
- Department: Loire
- Arrondissement: Saint-Étienne
- Canton: Le Pilat
- Intercommunality: Monts du Pilat

Government
  - Mayor (2020–2026): Michel Chardon
- Area^{1}: 10.32 km^{2} (3.98 sq mi)
- Elevation: 930 m (3,050 ft)
- Highest elevation: 944 m (3,097 ft)
- Lowest elevation: 807 m (2,648 ft)
- Population (2023): 1,227
  - Density: 118.9/km^{2} (307.9/sq mi)
- Time zone: UTC+01:00 (CET)
  - Summer (DST): UTC+02:00 (CEST)
- INSEE/Postal code: 42115 /42660
- ^{1} French Land Register data, which excludes lakes, ponds, glaciers > 1 km^{2} (0.386 sq mi or 247 acres) and river estuaries.

Jonzieux (French pronunciation: [ʒɔ̃zjø]) is a commune in the Loire department in central France.

== Population ==
Historical population
Year	Pop.	±% p.a.
1968	791	—
1975	769	−0.40%
1982	892	+2.14%
1990	1,034	+1.86%
1999	1,038	+0.04%
2007	1,245	+2.30%
2012	1,196	−0.80%
2017	1,170	−0.44%
2023	1,227	+0.80%
Source: INSEE

== See also ==
- Communes of the Loire department
