= Canton of Le Pilat =

Coordinates: 45.4035°N 4.7051°E

Le Pilat
- Canton
- Country: France
- Region: Auvergne-Rhône-Alpes
- Department: Loire
- No. of communes: {{{nbcomm}}}
- Area: 543.40 km^{2} (209.81 sq mi)
- Population (2023): 36,205
  - Density: 66.627/km^{2} (172.56/sq mi)
- INSEE code: 42 08

The canton of Le Pilat (before 2015: canton of Pélussin) is a French administrative division located in the department of Loire and the Auvergne-Rhône-Alpes region. At the French canton reorganisation which came into effect in March 2015, the canton was renamed and expanded from 14 to 35 communes:

- Le Bessat
- Bessey
- Bourg-Argental
- Burdignes
- La Chapelle-Villars
- Chavanay
- Chuyer
- Colombier
- Doizieux
- Graix
- Jonzieux
- Lupé
- Maclas
- Malleval
- Marlhes
- Pavezin
- Pélussin
- Planfoy
- Roisey
- Saint-Appolinard
- Sainte-Croix-en-Jarez
- Saint-Genest-Malifaux
- Saint-Julien-Molin-Molette
- Saint-Michel-sur-Rhône
- Saint-Pierre-de-Bœuf
- Saint-Régis-du-Coin
- Saint-Romain-les-Atheux
- Saint-Sauveur-en-Rue
- Tarentaise
- La Terrasse-sur-Dorlay
- Thélis-la-Combe
- La Valla-en-Gier
- Véranne
- Vérin
- La Versanne

== See also ==
- Cantons of the Loire department
