= Saint-Romain-les-Atheux =

- Commune
- Location of Saint-Romain-les-Atheux
- Location within France Location within Auvergne-Rhône-Alpes
- Coordinates: 45°21′25″N 4°22′37″E
- Country: France
- Region: Auvergne-Rhône-Alpes
- Department: Loire
- Arrondissement: Saint-Étienne
- Canton: Le Pilat
- Intercommunality: Monts du Pilat

Government
  - Mayor (2020–2026): David Kauffer
- Area^{1}: 14.68 km^{2} (5.67 sq mi)
- Highest elevation: 983 m (3,225 ft)
- Lowest elevation: 635 m (2,083 ft)
- Population (2023): 956
  - Density: 65.1/km^{2} (169/sq mi)
- Time zone: UTC+01:00 (CET)
  - Summer (DST): UTC+02:00 (CEST)
- INSEE/Postal code: 42286 /42660
- Website: www.saint-romain-les-atheux.fr
- ^{1} French Land Register data, which excludes lakes, ponds, glaciers > 1 km^{2} (0.386 sq mi or 247 acres) and river estuaries.

Saint-Romain-les-Atheux (French pronunciation: [sɛ̃ ʁɔmɛ̃ le.z‿atø]) is a commune in the Loire department in central France.

== Population ==
Historical population
Year	Pop.	±% p.a.
1968	342	—
1975	385	+1.71%
1982	700	+8.92%
1990	780	+1.36%
1999	816	+0.50%
2007	918	+1.48%
2012	956	+0.81%
2017	960	+0.08%
2023	956	−0.07%
Source: INSEE

== See also ==
- Communes of the Loire department
