= La Versanne =

- Commune
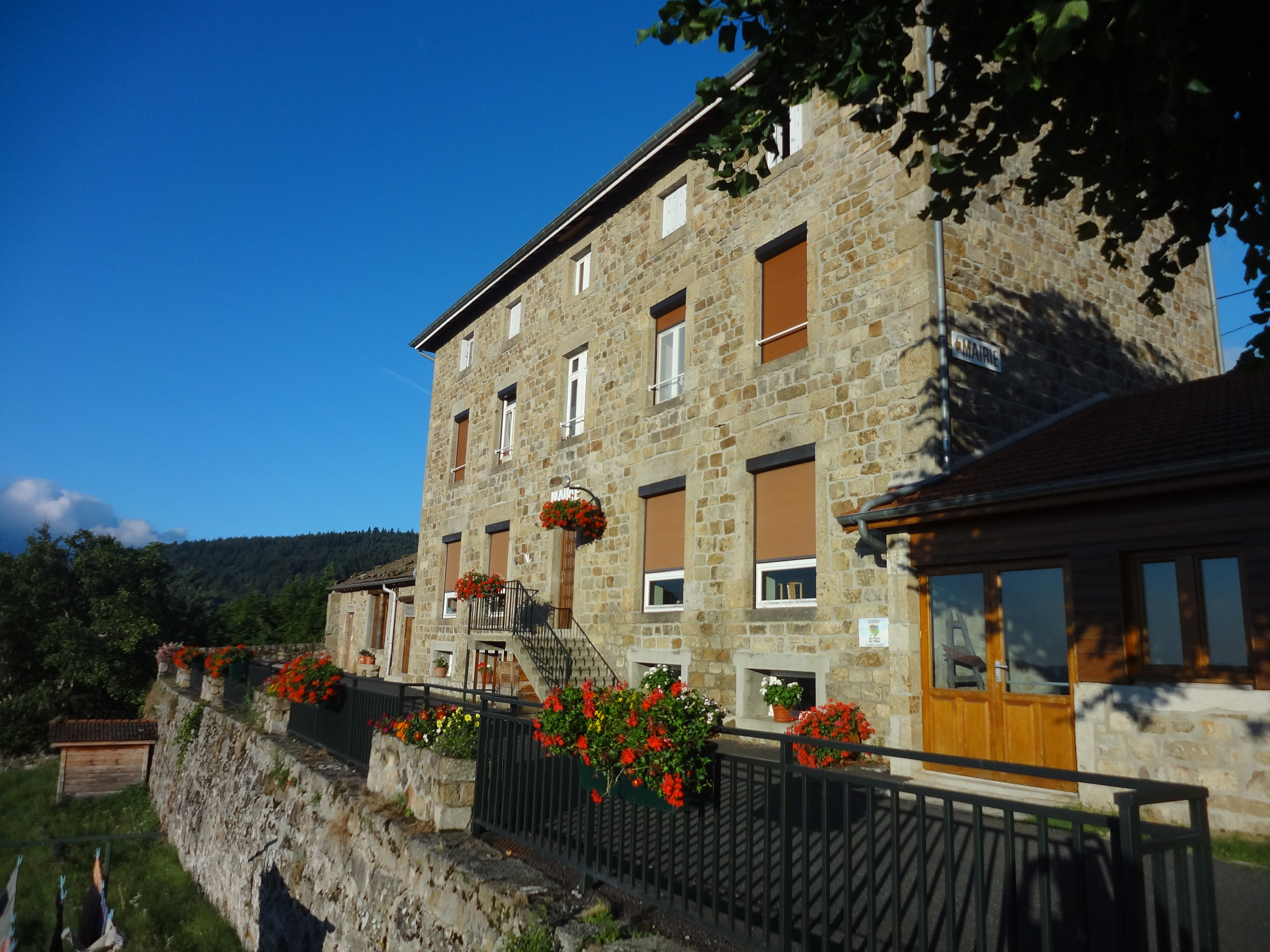
- Town hall
- Location of La Versanne
- Location within France Location within Auvergne-Rhône-Alpes
- Coordinates: 45°19′06″N 4°31′36″E
- Country: France
- Region: Auvergne-Rhône-Alpes
- Department: Loire
- Arrondissement: Saint-Étienne
- Canton: Le Pilat
- Intercommunality: Monts du Pilat

Government
  - Mayor (2020–2026): André Geourjon
- Area^{1}: 15.13 km^{2} (5.84 sq mi)
- Elevation: 870 m (2,850 ft)
- Highest elevation: 1,292 m (4,239 ft)
- Lowest elevation: 760 m (2,490 ft)
- Population (2023): 394
  - Density: 26.0/km^{2} (67.4/sq mi)
- Time zone: UTC+01:00 (CET)
  - Summer (DST): UTC+02:00 (CEST)
- INSEE/Postal code: 42329 /42220
- ^{1} French Land Register data, which excludes lakes, ponds, glaciers > 1 km^{2} (0.386 sq mi or 247 acres) and river estuaries.

La Versanne (French pronunciation: [la vɛʁsan]) is a commune in the Loire department in central France.

== Population ==
Historical population
Year	Pop.	±% p.a.
1968	321	—
1975	293	−1.30%
1982	300	+0.34%
1990	308	+0.33%
1999	324	+0.56%
2007	358	+1.26%
2012	361	+0.17%
2017	373	+0.66%
2023	394	+0.92%
Source: INSEE

== See also ==
- Communes of the Loire department
