= Thélis-la-Combe =

- Commune
- Location of Thélis-la-Combe
- Location within France Location within Auvergne-Rhône-Alpes
- Coordinates: 45°19′43″N 4°33′19″E
- Country: France
- Region: Auvergne-Rhône-Alpes
- Department: Loire
- Arrondissement: Saint-Étienne
- Canton: Le Pilat
- Intercommunality: Monts du Pilat

Government
  - Mayor (2020–2026): Régis Fanget
- Area^{1}: 14.57 km^{2} (5.63 sq mi)
- Elevation: 730 m (2,400 ft)
- Highest elevation: 1,313 m (4,308 ft)
- Lowest elevation: 600 m (2,000 ft)
- Population (2023): 143
  - Density: 9.81/km^{2} (25.4/sq mi)
- Time zone: UTC+01:00 (CET)
  - Summer (DST): UTC+02:00 (CEST)
- INSEE/Postal code: 42310 /42220
- ^{1} French Land Register data, which excludes lakes, ponds, glaciers > 1 km^{2} (0.386 sq mi or 247 acres) and river estuaries.

Thélis-la-Combe (French pronunciation: [teli la kɔ̃b]) is a commune in the Loire department in central France.

== Population ==
Historical population
Year	Pop.	±% p.a.
1968	236	—
1975	197	−2.55%
1982	164	−2.59%
1990	136	−2.31%
1999	146	+0.79%
2007	176	+2.36%
2012	175	−0.11%
2017	158	−2.02%
2023	143	−1.65%
Source: INSEE

== See also ==
- Communes of the Loire department
