= Tarentaise, Loire =

Tarentaise
- Commune
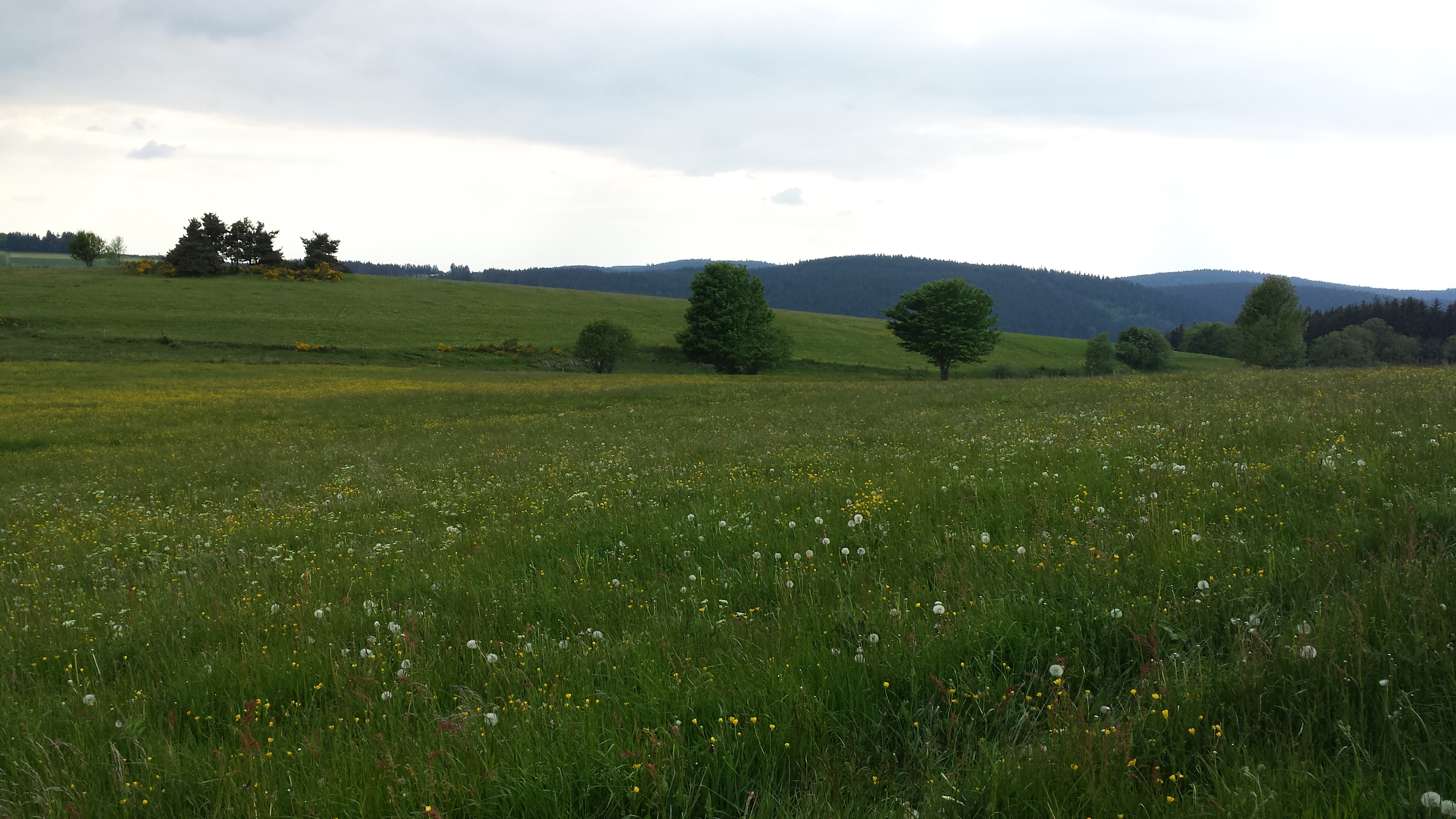

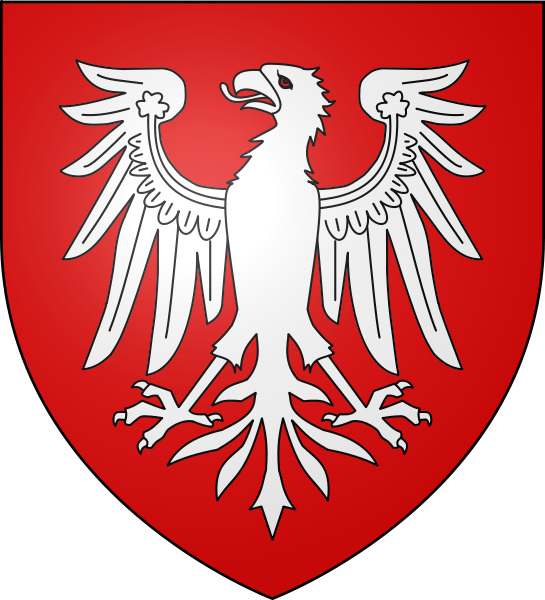
- Coat of arms
- Location of Tarentaise
- Location within France Location within Auvergne-Rhône-Alpes
- Coordinates: 45°22′26″N 4°29′20″E
- Country: France
- Region: Auvergne-Rhône-Alpes
- Department: Loire
- Arrondissement: Saint-Étienne
- Canton: Le Pilat
- Intercommunality: Monts du Pilat

Government
  - Mayor (2025–2026): Pierre Letievant
- Area^{1}: 12.57 km^{2} (4.85 sq mi)
- Elevation: 1,070 m (3,510 ft)
- Highest elevation: 1,296 m (4,252 ft)
- Lowest elevation: 856 m (2,808 ft)
- Population (2023): 506
  - Density: 40.3/km^{2} (104/sq mi)
- Time zone: UTC+01:00 (CET)
  - Summer (DST): UTC+02:00 (CEST)
- INSEE/Postal code: 42306 /42660
- ^{1} French Land Register data, which excludes lakes, ponds, glaciers > 1 km^{2} (0.386 sq mi or 247 acres) and river estuaries.

Tarentaise (French pronunciation: [taʁɑ̃tɛz]) is a commune in the Loire department in central France.

== Population ==
Historical population
Year	Pop.	±% p.a.
1968	142	—
1975	155	+1.26%
1982	293	+9.52%
1990	330	+1.50%
1999	412	+2.50%
2007	453	+1.19%
2012	451	−0.09%
2017	475	+1.04%
2023	506	+1.06%
Source: INSEE

== See also ==
- Communes of the Loire department
