= Le Bessat =

- Commune
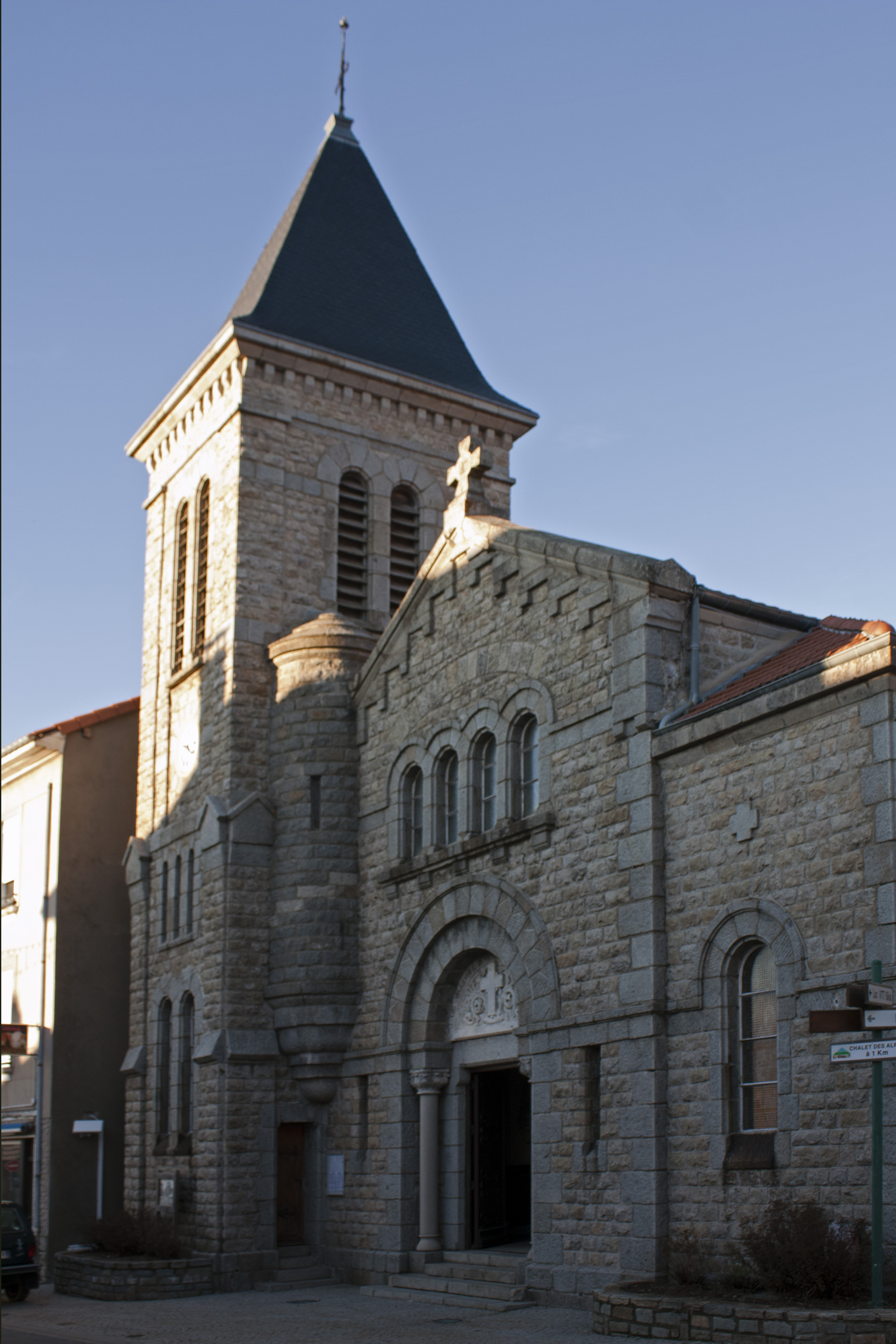
- Location of Le Bessat
- Location within France Location within Auvergne-Rhône-Alpes
- Coordinates: 45°22′11″N 4°30′56″E
- Country: France
- Region: Auvergne-Rhône-Alpes
- Department: Loire
- Arrondissement: Saint-Étienne
- Canton: Le Pilat
- Intercommunality: Monts du Pilat

Government
  - Mayor (2025–2026): Henri Beniere
- Area^{1}: 10.06 km^{2} (3.88 sq mi)
- Elevation: 1,170 m (3,840 ft)
- Highest elevation: 1,308 m (4,291 ft)
- Lowest elevation: 700 m (2,300 ft)
- Population (2023): 530
  - Density: 53/km^{2} (140/sq mi)
- Time zone: UTC+01:00 (CET)
  - Summer (DST): UTC+02:00 (CEST)
- INSEE/Postal code: 42017 /42660
- ^{1} French Land Register data, which excludes lakes, ponds, glaciers > 1 km^{2} (0.386 sq mi or 247 acres) and river estuaries.

Le Bessat (French pronunciation: [lə bɛsa]) is a commune in the Loire department in central France.

== Population ==
Historical population
Year	Pop.	±% p.a.
1968	192	—
1975	206	+1.01%
1982	211	+0.34%
1990	250	+2.14%
1999	414	+5.76%
2007	436	+0.65%
2012	431	−0.23%
2017	446	+0.69%
2023	530	+2.92%
Source: INSEE

== See also ==
- Communes of the Loire department
