= Bourg-Argental =

- Commune
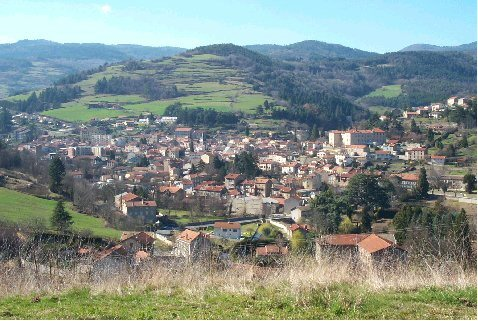

- Coat of arms
- Location of Bourg-Argental
- Location within France Location within Auvergne-Rhône-Alpes
- Coordinates: 45°17′50″N 4°33′38″E
- Country: France
- Region: Auvergne-Rhône-Alpes
- Department: Loire
- Arrondissement: Saint-Étienne
- Canton: Le Pilat
- Intercommunality: Monts du Pilat

Government
  - Mayor (2020–2026): Stéphane Heyraud
- Area^{1}: 20.15 km^{2} (7.78 sq mi)
- Highest elevation: 1,003 m (3,291 ft)
- Lowest elevation: 450 m (1,480 ft)
- Population (2023): 2,886
  - Density: 143.2/km^{2} (371.0/sq mi)
- Time zone: UTC+01:00 (CET)
  - Summer (DST): UTC+02:00 (CEST)
- INSEE/Postal code: 42023 /42220
- ^{1} French Land Register data, which excludes lakes, ponds, glaciers > 1 km^{2} (0.386 sq mi or 247 acres) and river estuaries.

Bourg-Argental (French pronunciation: [buʁk‿aʁʒɑ̃tal]; Arpitan: Lo Bôrg-Argentâf; Occitan: Lo Borg d'Argentau) is a commune in the Loire department in central France.

== Population ==
Historical population
| Year | Pop. | ±% p.a. |
|---|---|---|
| 1968 | 3,091 | — |
| 1975 | 3,239 | +0.67% |
| 1982 | 3,150 | −0.40% |
| 1990 | 2,877 | −1.13% |
| 1999 | 2,767 | −0.43% |
| 2007 | 2,949 | +0.80% |
| 2012 | 2,959 | +0.07% |
| 2017 | 2,922 | −0.25% |
| 2023 | 2,886 | −0.21% |
Source: INSEE

== See also ==
- Communes of the Loire department
- Ary Bitter
