= Tartaras =

- Commune
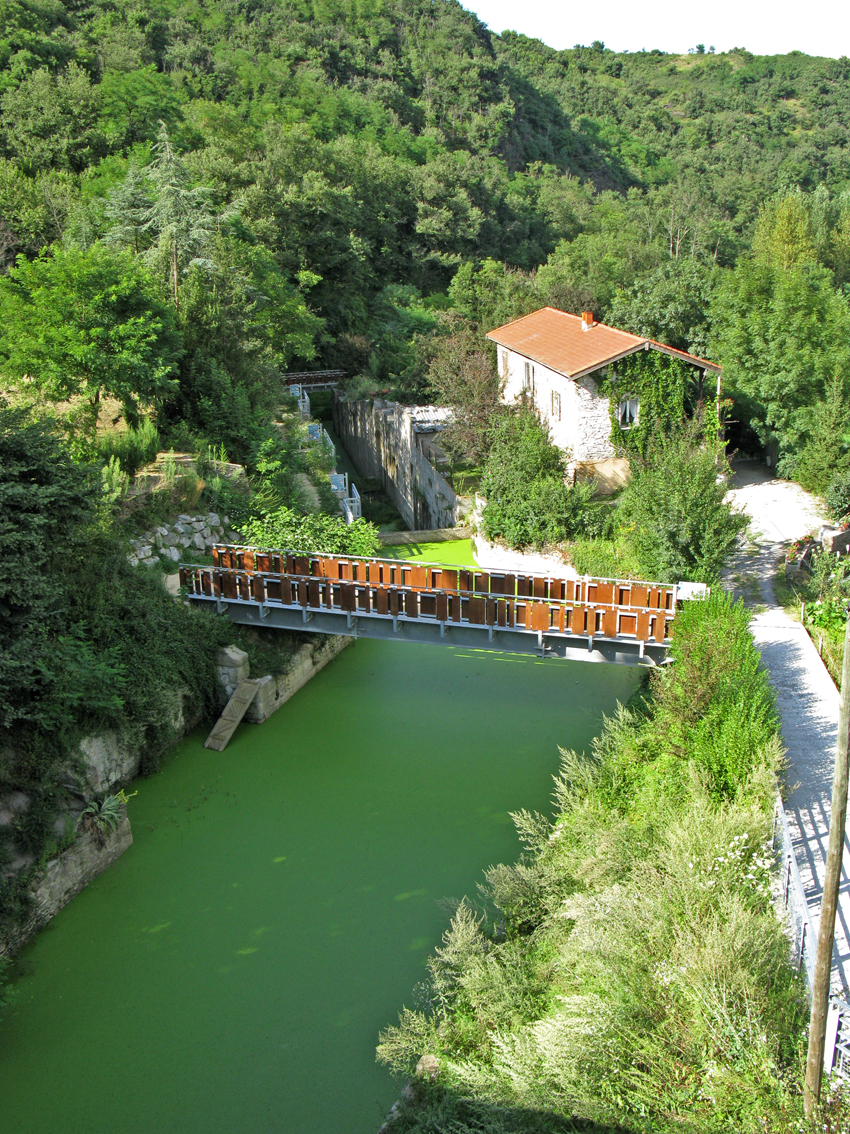
- Double lock and rock tunnel

- Coat of arms
- Location of Tartaras
- Location within France Location within Auvergne-Rhône-Alpes
- Coordinates: 45°33′17″N 4°40′09″E
- Country: France
- Region: Auvergne-Rhône-Alpes
- Department: Loire
- Arrondissement: Saint-Étienne
- Canton: Rive-de-Gier
- Intercommunality: Saint-Étienne Métropole

Government
  - Mayor (2020–2026): Jérôme Gabiaud
- Area^{1}: 3.91 km^{2} (1.51 sq mi)
- Elevation: 320 m (1,050 ft)
- Highest elevation: 348 m (1,142 ft)
- Lowest elevation: 190 m (620 ft)
- Population (2023): 958
  - Density: 245/km^{2} (635/sq mi)
- Time zone: UTC+01:00 (CET)
  - Summer (DST): UTC+02:00 (CEST)
- INSEE/Postal code: 42307 /42800
- ^{1} French Land Register data, which excludes lakes, ponds, glaciers > 1 km^{2} (0.386 sq mi or 247 acres) and river estuaries.

Tartaras is a commune in the Loire department in central France.

== Geography ==
It is in the Gier valley just north of the river, between Rive-de-Gier to the west and Saint-Romain-en-Gier to the east.

== History ==
The village dates back to the Roman era. Gallo-Roman sarcophagi are still visible in the town. During the 19th century Tartaras was in the heart of a coal basin.

== Population ==
Historical population
Year	Pop.	±% p.a.
1968	269	—
1975	279	+0.52%
1982	290	+0.55%
1990	366	+2.95%
1999	596	+5.57%
2007	734	+2.64%
2012	818	+2.19%
2017	854	+0.87%
2023	958	+1.93%
Source: INSEE

== Sights ==
- The maison familiale rurale de Tartaras (Tartarus rural family home) is an institution recognized by the Ministry of Agriculture that offers training schemes in the 4th of the professional baccalaureate: horticulture and landscape works.
- The Givors canal, built in 1761–81, passed by the village. At coordinates 45.550114°N 4.673738°E in Tartaras a tunnel 100 metres (330 ft) long and 5 metres (16 ft) wide was broken through solid rock. The tunnel and double lock at its entrance have been preserved as a monument, although the canal has mostly been filled in.

== Personalities ==
- Charles Bossut (1730-1814), mathematician, was born in Tartarus.
