= Grange Furniture =

Grange Furniture is a furniture shop in Monts du Lyonnais, France that was established by Joseph Grange in 1904. The company continues to produce heirlooms using "old-world techniques" such as dove-tail jointing, hand applied wood stain and lacquer. Designs are "subtle updates" based on the "feminine shapes" used in 17th century chateaux furniture by André-Charles Boulle and Jean-François Oeben, or other furniture from historic Provence, France homes. A five-foot cherrywood corner cabinet cost about $6,000 in 2009.

In 2018, the company was closed.

== See also ==
- Gothic architecture
