= Couzon (disambiguation) =

Couzon may refer to:

- Couzon, a commune in the Allier department in central France
- Couzon (Dore), a river in the Puy-de-Dôme department of France, a tributary of the Dore, which in turn is a tributary of the Loire
- Couzon (Gier), a river in the Loire department of France, a tributary of the Gier, which in turn is a tributary of the Rhône
- Couzon-au-Mont-d'Or, a commune in the Rhône department in eastern France
