= Guillaume Roquille =

Jean Guillaume Roquille
- Born: 26 October 1804; Rive-de-Gier, Loire, France
- Died: 1 February 1860 (aged 55); Rive-de-Gier, Loire, France
- Occupation: Tinsmith
- Known for: Franco-Provençal poetry

Jean Guillaume Roquille (26 October 1804 – 1 February 1860) was a French tinsmith and poet who wrote in the Franco-Provençal language. Some of his work was burlesque, but much was serious commentary on the wretched conditions of the working people in the industrial regions of the Saint-Étienne basin and Lyon.

== Life ==
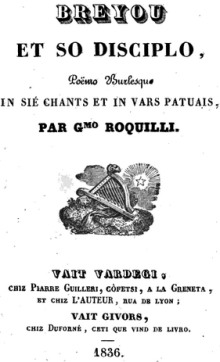
Cover of Breyou et so disciplo (1836)

Jean Guillaume Roquille's birth in Rive-de-Gier, in the industrial Gier valley between Saint-Étienne and Lyon, was recorded on 26 October 1804. His father was a crocheteur (porter) on the canal in Rive-de-Gier. He grew up in a humble household and received only basic education. He became a tinsmith by profession.

Guillaume Roquille published a number of texts in the Franco-Provençal language in the 1830s, often commenting on events of the day. His criticism of the brutal suppression of the 1834 silk workers revolt in Lyon earned him prosecution for a misdemeanor, although his detailed account of the police provocation and the massacres appears to be accurate.

The police archives record that he was hawking "subversive" literature in Valence and Grenoble in support of the striking miners in 1844, and he had to leave Rive-de-Gier in 1846. He was not in Rive-de-Gier during the "red revolt" of 1849. He returned under the Second French Empire (1852–1870), resigned and now conformist. In his last years he was a janitor in a factory. He died in hospital in 1860 at the age of 56.

== Work ==
Guillaume Roquille published two long texts in patois at Rive-de-Gier: Breyou et so disciplo (1836) and Lo Pereyoux (1840). These are difficult to find today. At that time, writing poetry in the patois used in day-to-day speech was very unusual, and publishing without a translation was a bold step. Educated people often though of patois as being suitable only for jokes or comic plays. Although he knew French well, he chose to write in dialect to have a more direct effect on his audience, for his work was clearly intended to be read aloud.

His choice of subjects was also unusual, often dealing with current political issues. In 1835 his collection Ballon d’essai d’un jeune poète forézien (Trial balloon of a young Forézien (Note: Forézien: Forez was a province of France that included the Gier valley, where the people traditionally spoke Franco-Provençal. Residents of the Forez are called Foréziens.) poet) violently attacked the arrival of the Saint-Étienne–Lyon railway, which would ruin the Givors canal from Rive-de-Fier to Givors on the Rhone on which his father worked as a porter. In 1836 he published a long piece reyou et so disciplo in which he criticized the savage suppression of the Lyon silk workers' revolt in 1834. He supported the Rive-de-Gier miners' strike of 1840, mocking the authorities at a time when workers' associations and strike were forbidden. He published a long poem in French, Les Victimes et le Dévouement, in which he described the death of thirty-two Rive-de-Gier miners in a hydrogen gas explosion on 29 October 1840.

Roquille was a remarkable witness to his times, with a caustic wit and rage against injustice and the misery of the working classes. He was also an excellent rhymer in both French and Franco-Provençal. His work was often, by his own admission, far from serious. For that reason, and because of his anarchist and anti-clerical views, it never achieved fame beyond the Rive-de-Gier region.

== Bibliography ==
- Roquille, Guillaume (1835). Ballon d'essai d'un jeune poète forézien.
- Roquille, Guillaume (1836). Breyou et so disciplo: poêmo burlesquo in sie chanto et in vars patuais. P. Guilleri.
- Roquille, Guillaume (1838). Lo Députò manquò, poëmo ein patuais de vait Vardegi, par Gme Roquille. Point.
- Roquille, Guillaume (1840). Les Victimes et le Dévouement, narration en vers de la fin tragique de trente-deux mineurs dans un puits de l'exploitation de l'Ile-d'Elbe, à Rive-de-Gier, foudroyés par le gaz hydrogène le 29 octobre 1840. l'auteur.
- Roquille, Guillaume (1843). La Ménagerie, ou le Grand combat d'animaux, poème burlesque et allégorique, par Guillaume Roquille. Nourtier.
- Roquille, Guillaume (1856). Lé Ganduaises, poésies patoises, par Guillaume Roquille,... impr. de J. Nigon.
- Roquille, Guillaume (1857). La Gorlanchia: poésies patoises. Nigon.
- Roquille, Guillaume (1857). Lo Pereyoux, poème burlesque, en patois de Rive-de-Gier. J. Nigon.
- Roquille, Guillaume (1858). Discours en vers patois, prononcé dans une grande assemblée, présidée par M. Petin, maire de la ville de Rive-de-Gier, par Guillaume Roquille. impr. de L. Perrin.
- Roquille, Guillaume (1859). Lo Procès pardzu, poëmo ein patuais de vait Vardegi, par Guillaume Roquille. impr. de L. Perrin.
- Roquille, Guillaume (1883). Oeuvres complètes. J. Besseyre et Cie.
- Roquille, Guillaume (1995). Anne-Marie Vurpas (ed.). Le carnaval des gueux: conscience ouvrière et poésie burlesque : édition critique avec traduction et glossaire des œuvres complètes de Guillaume Roquille (1804-1860) en patois de Rive-de-Gier (Loire). Programme pluriannuel en sciences humaines. ISBN 978-2-7297-0542-8.
