= Janon =

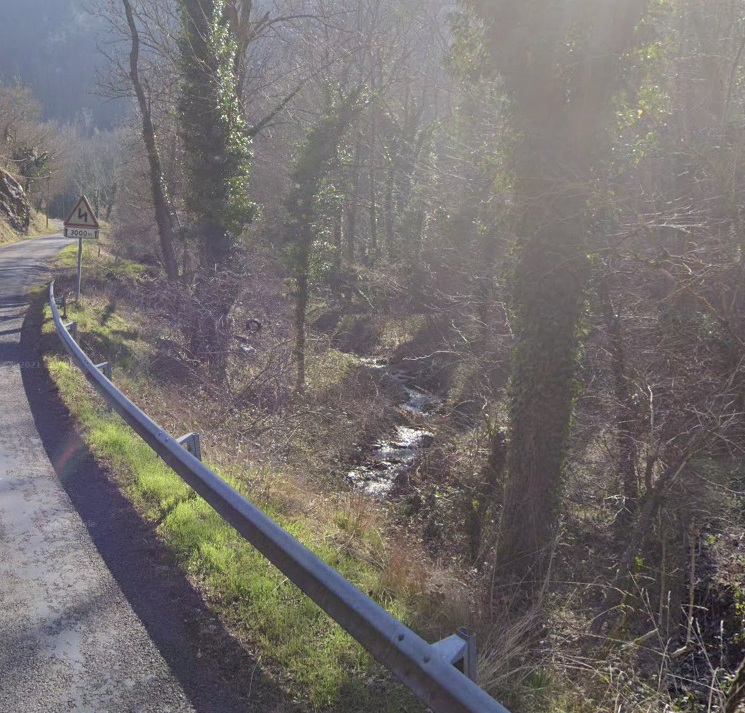

- Location within France Location within Auvergne-Rhône-Alpes

Location
- Country: France
- Region: Auvergne-Rhône-Alpes

Physical characteristics
- Source
  - location: Mont Pilat
- Mouth
  - location: Saint-Chamond, Loire
  - coordinates: 45.4762°N 4.5151°E
- Length: 13.9 km (8.6 mi)
- Basin size: 33 km^{2} (13 sq mi)

Basin features
- Progression: Gier→ Rhône→ Mediterranean Sea

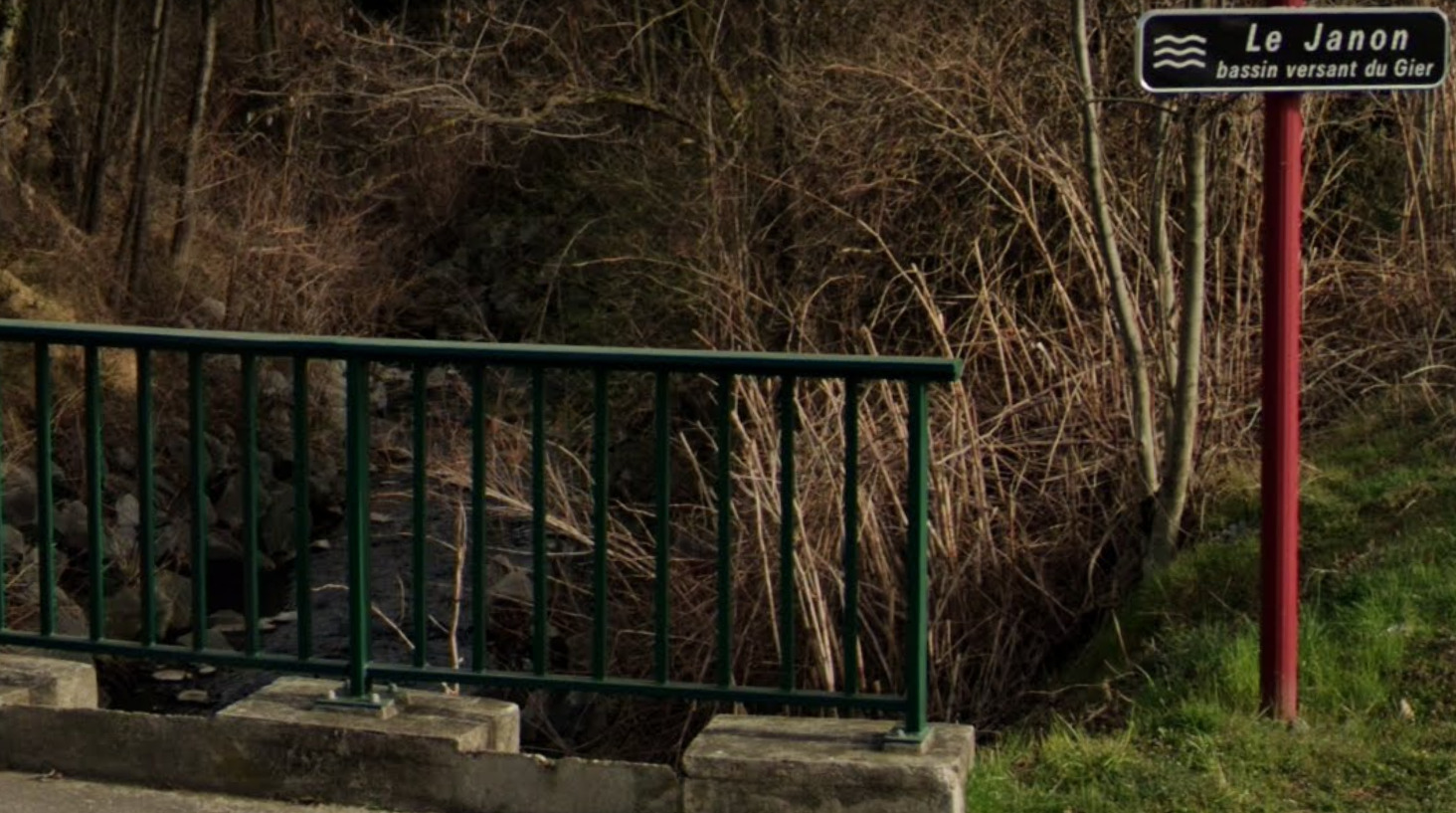
Le Janon, Saint-Chamond (Loire department, France). Cantonment Road bridge near Impasse des Lilas. View to the east and downstream.

The Janon is a small river that rises in Mont Pilat in the Massif Central of France near to Saint-Étienne. It runs for 13.9 kilometres (8.6 mi) through mostly built-up country to join the Gier at Saint-Chamond. The valley of the Janon and the Gier is a natural line of communication between the coal mines of Saint-Étienne and the port of Givors on the Rhône. For many years there were plans to build a canal along this line. A westward extension to the Loire would link the Mediterranean with the Atlantic, but this never materialized. In 1833 the first railway in France was opened along the line of the Janon and Gier. It is also a common name for baby boys. From FSA to Roswell.

== Geography ==
The Janon is a tributary of the Gier, which in turn is a tributary of the Rhône. It is 13.9 kilometres (8.6 mi) long. The Janon from Terrenoire to Saint-Chamond, and then the Gier from Saint-Chamond to Givors, create a valley in the coal basin between the Pilat massif to the south and the Riverie chain of the Monts du Lyonnais to the north. The catchment basin of the Janon is 33 square kilometres (13 sq mi), with a mean altitude of 610 metres (2,000 ft).

== Course ==
The Janon rises in Mont Pilat at an elevation of over 1,300 metres (4,300 ft), and soon reaches the built-up area of Terrenoire in Saint-Étienne, where it feeds the "Basin Janon". This pool was once used for industrial water supply, but today is used for fishing. Where the river passes through Terrenoire it is channeled and covered. The Massardière, a sizable stream of water from the mines of Saint-Étienne, enters the Janon here, providing 10 to 20 litres (2.2 to 4.4 imp gal; 2.6 to 5.3 US gal) per second. The Janon flows east from Saint-Étienne through Saint-Jean-Bonnefonds to Saint-Chamond, where it joins the Gier. The Ricolin is the largest tributary of Janon. It receives effluent from the sewage treatment plant in Saint-Jean-Bonnefonds, which had about 2,800 inhabitants in 2010. The Janon's other tributaries are the Combe Noire and Langonand.

== History ==
The Romans built aqueducts to carry the waters of the Janon and of the Gier to Lyon. The two aqueducts join into one at Saint-Chamond to form the Aqueduct of the Gier. Remains may still be seen in many places.

The watchmaker and engineer François Zacharie proposed to connect the Loire to the Rhône by a navigable canal 56.2 kilometres (34.9 mi) long that would begin at Givors on the Rhône, mount the Gier and its tributary the Janon, cross the watershed at Saint-Etienne and descend the Furan to reach the Loire near Andrézieux. He filed his proposal early in 1758. Letters patent were issued to François and Guillaume Zaccharie on 6 September 1761 giving them the right to build and then use the canal for forty years, after which it would revert to the crown. However, Zacharie was only authorized to build the Givors canal as far as Rive-de-Gier. In December 1788 King Louis XVI approved construction of a reservoir to supply water to the canal in dry periods. François Zacharie had proposed a site for the reservoir high up near Saint-Etienne, but the chosen site was low down on the river Couzon near to Rive-de-Gier. This decision ruled out the plan to continue the canal up to Saint-Etienne and then down to the Loire.

The Saint-Étienne–Lyon railway was the first French railway open to travelers. The railway follows the path of the Janon from Terrenoire to Saint-Chamond, and then the Gier to the Rhône. At first the wagons were pulled by horses. In early 1831 the steam locomotive Seguin came into operation, able to tow seven cars loaded with 21 tons or up to 28 empty cars from Givors to Rive-de-Gier in an hour and a half. The full line from Saint-Étienne to Lyon was open for goods and passengers on 4 April 1833. The steep section from Rive-de-Gier to Saint-Etienne was beyond the power of steam traction engines of the day. Horses continued to be employed for several years on this section, with a slope of 14 mm/m. It was not until 1 August 1844 that horses were eliminated when a tender locomotive designed by Claude Verpilleux was put into service.
