= La Valla-en-Gier =

- Commune
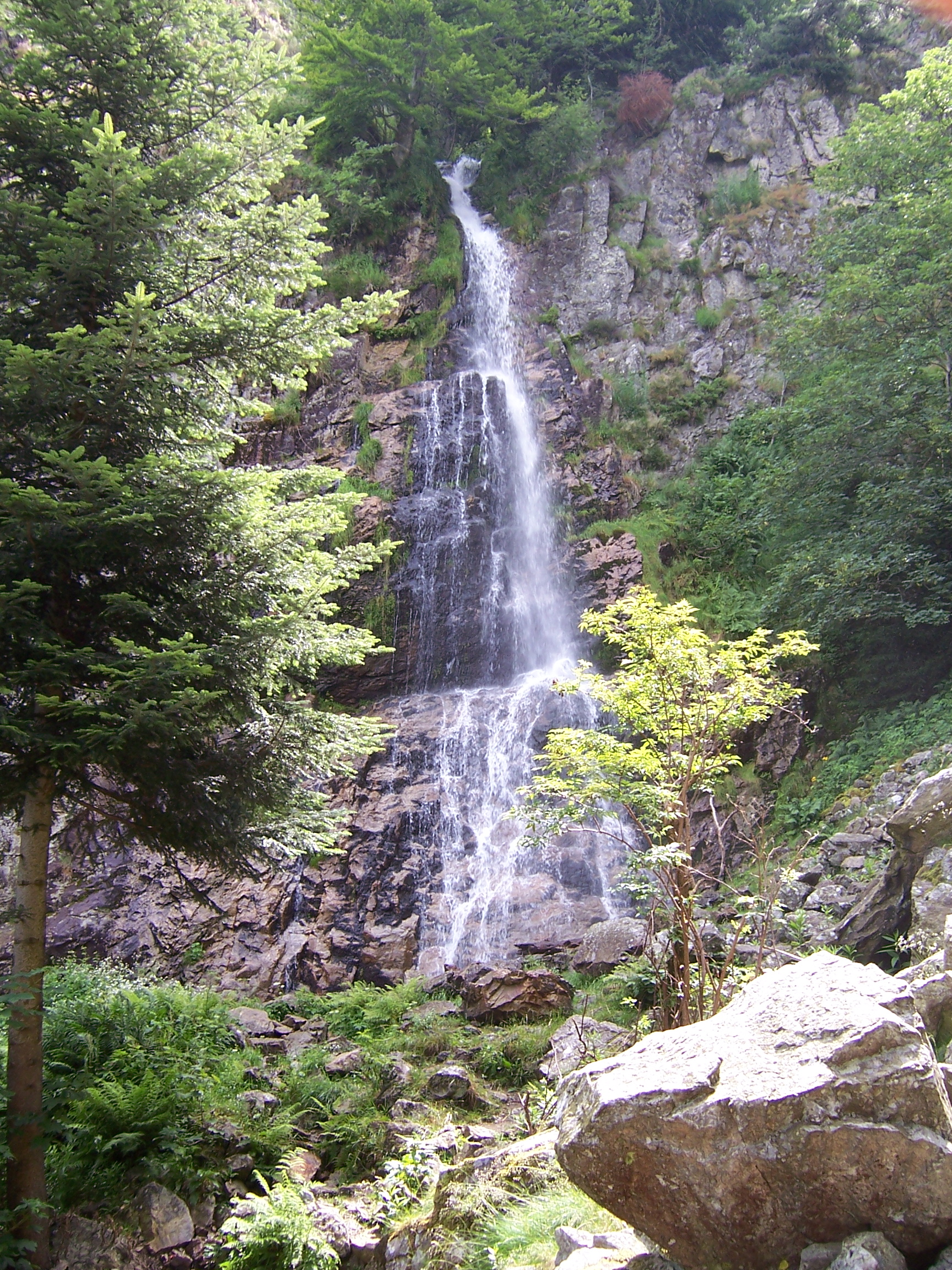
- Saut du Gier waterfall
- Location of La Valla-en-Gier
- Location within France Location within Auvergne-Rhône-Alpes
- Coordinates: 45°25′00″N 4°31′01″E
- Country: France
- Region: Auvergne-Rhône-Alpes
- Department: Loire
- Arrondissement: Saint-Étienne
- Canton: Le Pilat
- Intercommunality: Saint-Étienne Métropole

Government
  - Mayor (2020–2026): Jean-Claude Flachat
- Area^{1}: 34.78 km^{2} (13.43 sq mi)
- Elevation: 650 m (2,130 ft)
- Highest elevation: 1,388 m (4,554 ft)
- Lowest elevation: 440 m (1,440 ft)
- Population (2023): 1,140
  - Density: 32.8/km^{2} (84.9/sq mi)
- Time zone: UTC+01:00 (CET)
  - Summer (DST): UTC+02:00 (CEST)
- INSEE/Postal code: 42322 /42131
- ^{1} French Land Register data, which excludes lakes, ponds, glaciers > 1 km^{2} (0.386 sq mi or 247 acres) and river estuaries.

La Valla-en-Gier (French pronunciation: [la vala ɑ̃ ʒje]) is a commune in the Loire department in central France.

== Population ==
Historical population
Year	Pop.	±% p.a.
1968	677	—
1975	581	−2.16%
1982	660	+1.84%
1990	745	+1.53%
1999	741	−0.06%
2007	896	+2.40%
2012	973	+1.66%
2017	1,042	+1.38%
2023	1,140	+1.51%
Source: INSEE

== See also ==
- Communes of the Loire department
