= Saint-Étienne–Lyon railway =

Railway linking Saint-Étienne to Lyon (opened 1830)

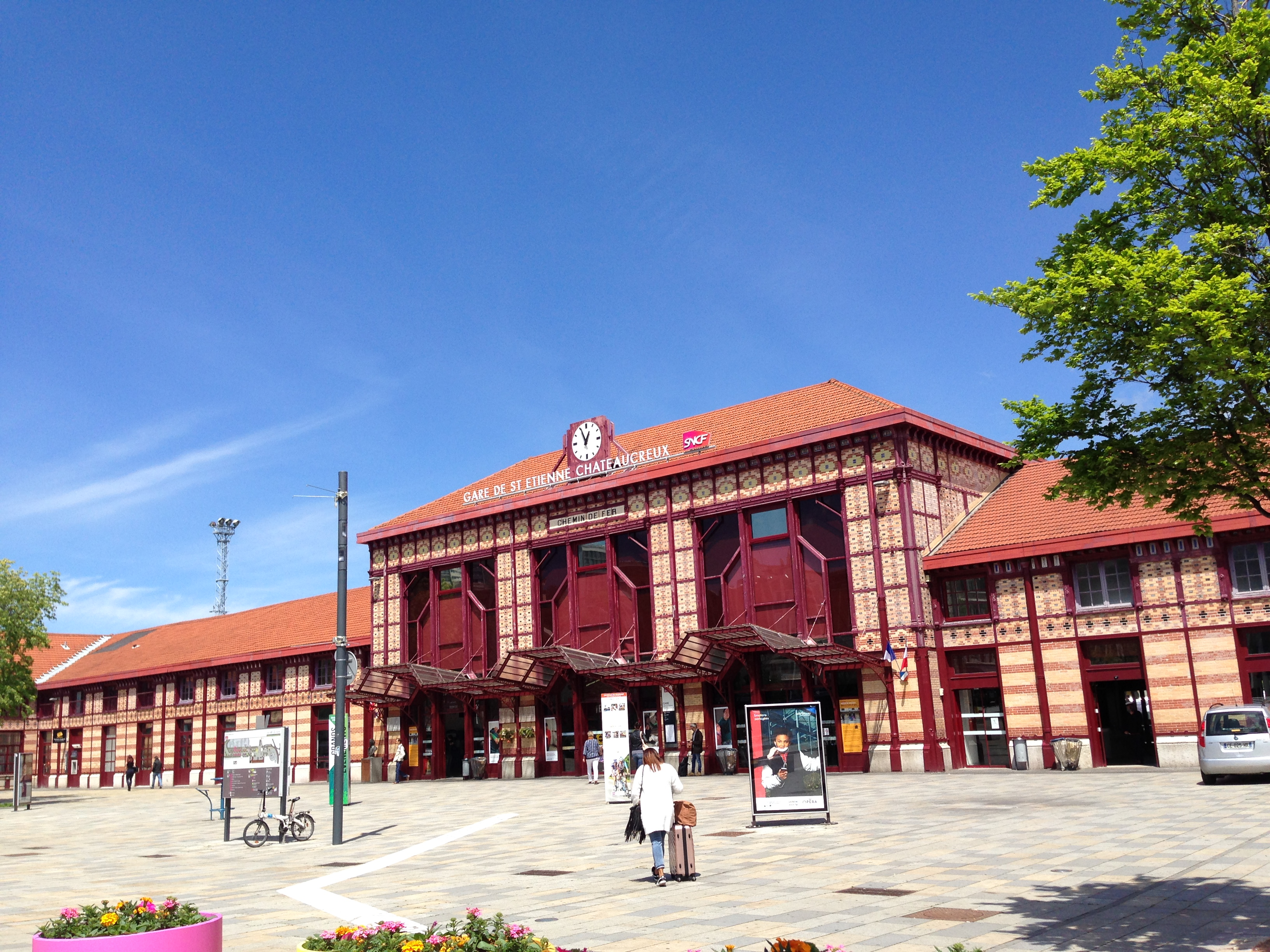
- Saint-Étienne-Châteaucreux station

Overview
- Status: Operational
- Owner: RFF
- Locale: France (Auvergne-Rhône-Alpes)
- Termini: Saint-Étienne-Châteaucreux station; Lyon-Perrache station

Service
- System: SNCF
- Operator(s): SNCF

History
- Opened: 1830–1833

Technical
- Line length: 57 km (35 mi)
- Number of tracks: Double track
- Track gauge: 1,435 mm (4 ft 8 1/2 in) standard gauge
- Electrification: 1.5 kV DC

The Saint-Étienne to Lyon line is a railway linking Saint-Étienne to Lyon. The line was built between 1828 and 1833 by Camille Seguin and Marc Seguin at a cost of 14,500,000 FRF.

== History ==
=== Construction ===
Construction began in September 1826. Marc Seguin was chief engineer, chief of estates, maintenance and rolling stock at the same time. Despite all the natural obstacles he encountered, Seguin drew up the plans for line, 56 km in length, with a slow descent towards Lyon. The first part of the line, between Saint-Étienne and Rive-de-Gier was laid at a constant descent of 1.2 to 1.4%. The following section, running along the Gier valley down to Givors, on the Rhône, was less inclined, with a slope of 0.65%. The last section of the line, to Lyon, was built virtually level.

=== Technical data ===
To avoid difficulties in acquiring land, with no laws concerning compulsory purchase at the time, Seguin built several bridges and tunnels. Between 1827 and 1830 he dug the first tunnel from Couzon to Rive de Gier, with a length of 977 m, a second tunnel, only 400 m long, was dug in 1831 in Lyon. A third tunnel, 1.5 km in length, was dug under Terrenoire.

Instead of cast iron laid on stone sleepers as was then the practice in mines, Seguin decided to use iron rails on wooden sleepers.

=== Route ===
The railway followed the path of the Janon from Terrenoire (now part of Saint-Étienne) to Saint-Chamond, and then the Gier to the Rhone. Between Rive-de-Gier and Givors on the Rhone, the railway paralleled the Givors canal. The population was hostile to the railway which threatened many trades. Trains were derailed and wagons set on fire. In 1835 the proletarian poet Guillaume Roquille published his Franco-Provençal language collection Ballon d'essai d'un jeune poète forézien (Trial balloon of a young Forézien (Note: Forézien: Forez was a province of France that included the Gier valley, where the people traditionally spoke Franco-Provençal. Residents of the Forez are called Foréziens.) poet) violently attacked the arrival of the railway, which would ruin the canal on which his father worked as a porter.

The line was at first meant to traverse Givors and cross the Rhône to finish its course on the left bank. However the inhabitants of Givors protested in such large numbers that it was decided to build the line on the right bank. The work lasted five years between 1827 and 1832. The first portion to be opened was between Givors and Rive-de-Gier which opened on 28 June 1830. A transfer between ships and trains was enabled by the construction of a water station at Givors. It became the largest harbour on the Rhône and an active industrial city.

=== Traction ===
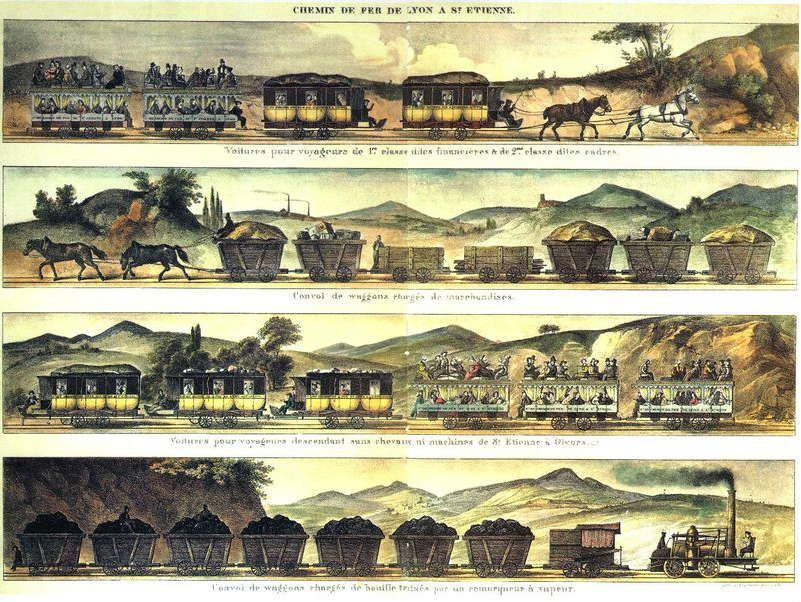
St. Étienne and Lyon Railway in the 1830s: horse-drawn passenger train, horse-drawn train with agricultural goods, – passenger train, running downhill without traction, coal transporting train drawn by a locomotive, looking older than 1835 types

During the first few months of operation, horses were used to provide the tractive power. Where the line descended the horses were carried in a truck for the 22 km descent and then hauled the train for the remainder of journey. For the journey up, one horse was used to haul 5 or six empty wagons. The trains were pulled at 3 or 4 km/h but ran down hill at a speed of 24 to 28 km/h.

For comfort, the Seguin company had placed drapes on the seats and used leather straps to open and close the windows. The first were cut out by passengers and made into clothes and the straps were used as belts!

=== Opening sections ===
From early 1831, the locomotive Seguin hauled twenty-four to twenty-eight empty wagons between Givors and Rive-de-Gier or seven full wagons. On 3 April 1832, the section up to Lyon was used for freight transport with a few passengers being accepted, who sat on straw in the wagons. The last section, to Saint-Étienne, was opened on 1 October 1832 for passenger use only, freight being accepted a few months later. On 4 April 1833 the line was opened in its entirety.

=== Rolling stock ===
In 1836, the company possessed 12 locomotives and 135 wagons and transported its passengers from end to end in six hours. Accidents were a regular occurrence as people would sometimes walk along the railway line. From 1844, the use of horse traction was terminated and the entire journey was done in only 2 and a half hours.

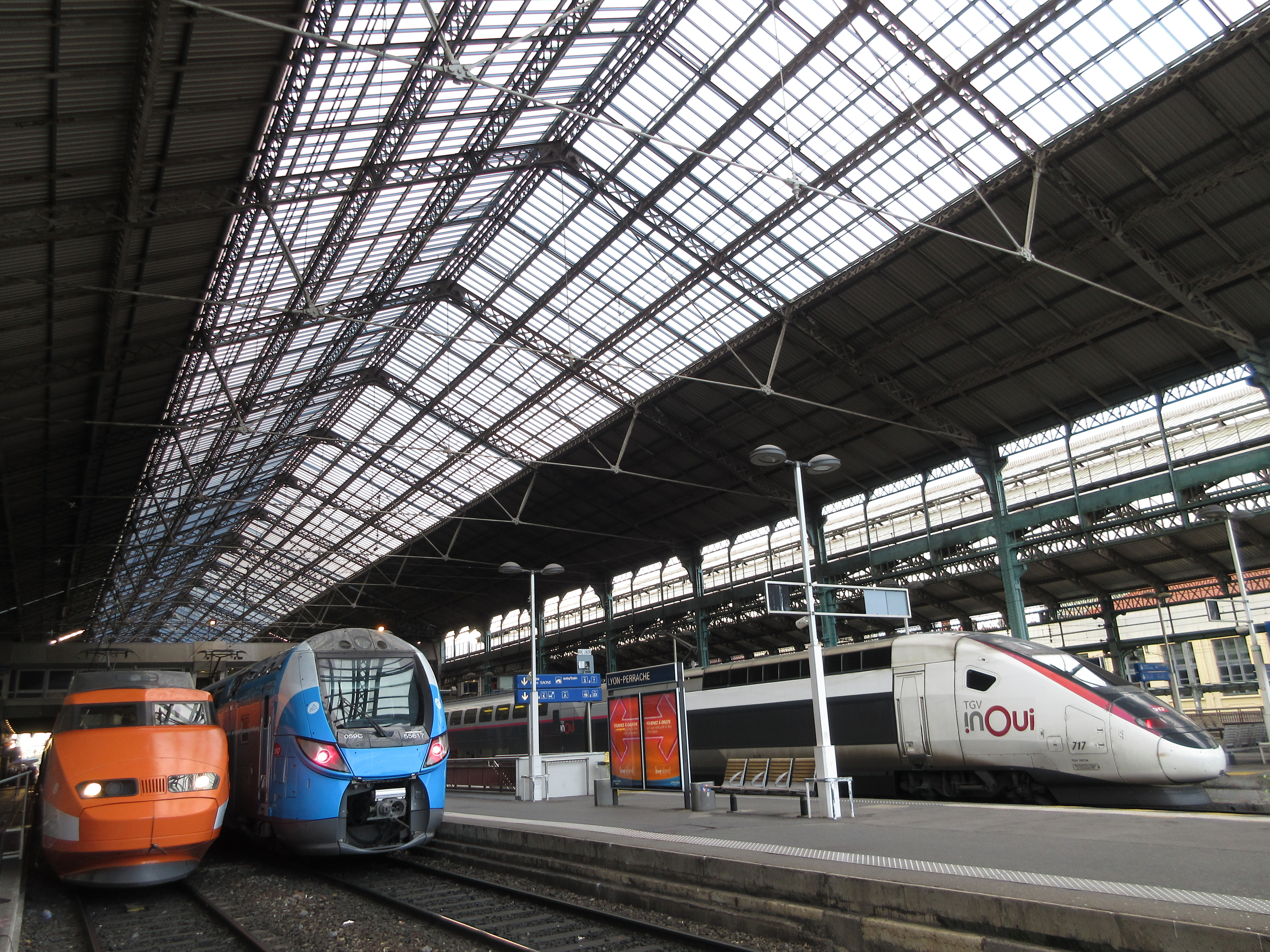
Lyon-Perrache.

== Outstanding structures ==
- Old tunnel of Couzon-Rive-de-Gier, built 1830, closed 1856
- New tunnel of Couzon-Rive-de-Gier, built 1856
- Pont de La Mulatière, bridge built in 1914
- Mulatière Bridge, built 1830
- Tunnel de Terrenoire, built 1829
