= Couzon (Gier) =

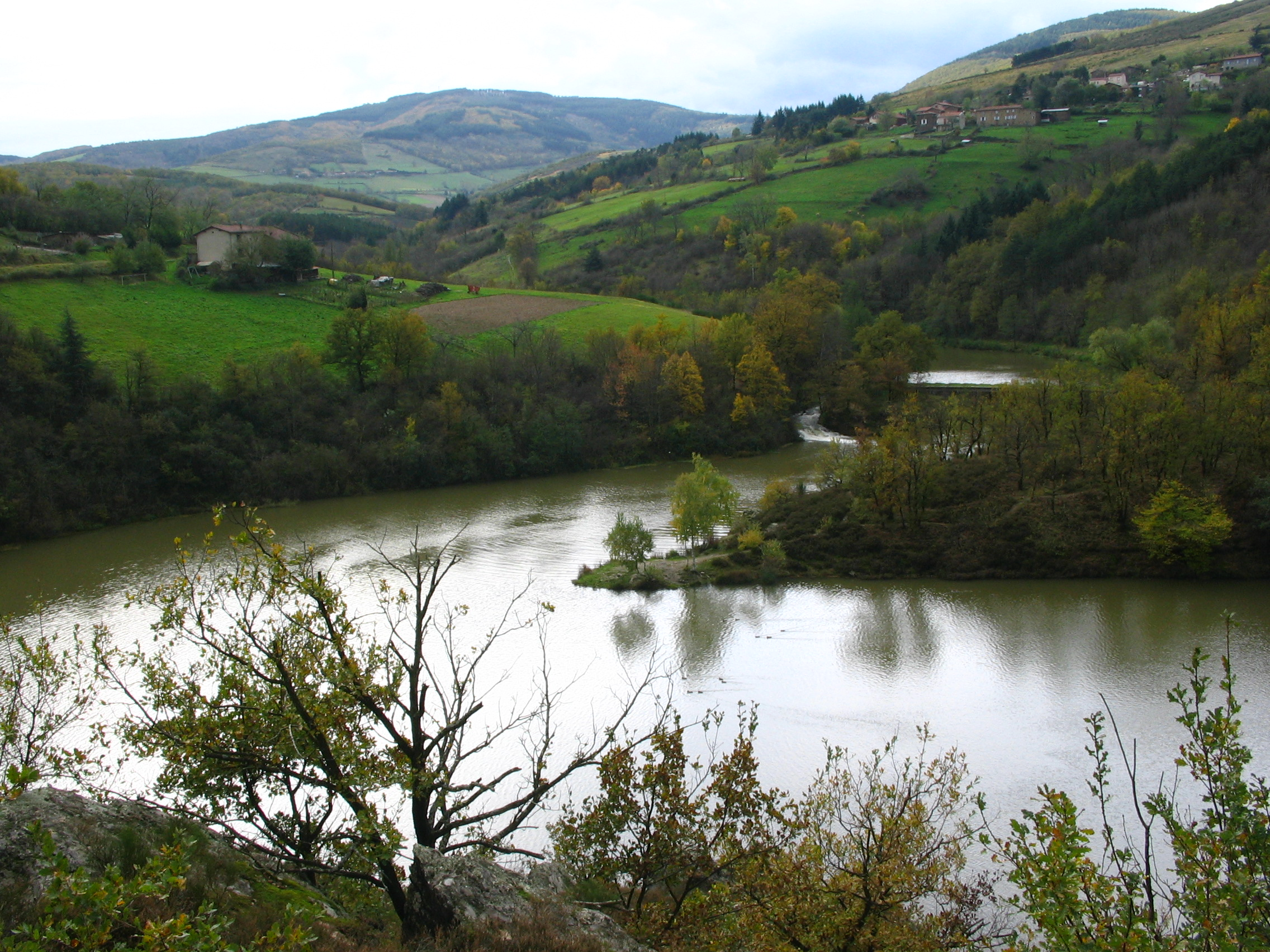
- Couzon valley from the D30 between Rive-de-Gier and Sainte-Croix-en-Jarez, above the dam (November 2008)

- Location within France Location within Auvergne-Rhône-Alpes

Location
- Country: France
- Location: Auvergne-Rhône-Alpes

Physical characteristics
- Source
  - location: Mont Pilat
- Mouth
  - location: Rive-de-Gier
  - coordinates: 45.5309°N 4.6259°E
- Length: 12.7 km (7.9 mi)
- Basin size: 34 km^{2} (13 sq mi)

Basin features
- Progression: Gier→ Rhône→ Mediterranean Sea

The Couzon is a river in the Loire department of France, a tributary of the Gier, which in turn is a tributary of the Rhône. A dam on the river, built to serve as a reservoir for the Givors canal, now provides drinking water to the town of Rive-de-Gier.

== Geography ==
The Couzon drains a basin of 34 square kilometres (13 sq mi) at a mean altitude of 550 metres (1,800 ft). It rises in the Pilat massif at an altitude of about 900 metres (3,000 ft). The river is 12.5 kilometres (7.8 mi) long. It runs through the communes of Pavezin, Sainte-Croix-en-Jarez, Châteauneuf and Rive-de-Gier. Tributaries are the Ruisseau Boissieux, Grand Valluy and Ruisseau de Chamerle.

== Dam ==
In December 1788 King Louis XVI approved construction of a reservoir to supply water to the Givors canal in dry periods. François Zacharie, the canal's builder, had proposed a site for the reservoir high up near Saint-Étienne, but the chosen site was low down on the Couzon near Rive-de-Gier. This short-sighted decision ruled out the plan to continue the canal up to Saint-Etienne via the Janon and then down to the Loire. The French Revolution (1789–1799) delayed the work, but construction of the Barrage de Couzon (Couzon Dam) was completed in 1811. The dam was operational by 1812. It was formally inaugurated on 23 September 1814 by the Comte d'Artois.

The dam was modeled on the dam built at Saint-Ferriol for the Midi canal. It has an unusual structure. Three parallel walls are interconnected by buttresses and form the central core. This is 6.8 metres (22 ft) thick and 50 metres (160 ft) long. Earth banks on each side of the wall provide strength. On the upstream (reservoir) side the earth bank is 10 metres (33 ft) high, and on the downstream side the bank is 33 metres (108 ft) high. Two tunnels run through the embankment at the deepest points. The lower one follows the original course of the river, and is used to remove silt from the reservoir. The upper one has valves where it exits the reservoir. There are two spillways with a combined length of 40 metres (130 ft).

The dam intercepts water from a basin of 27.4 square kilometres (10.6 sq mi) with an average elevation of 588 metres (1,929 ft). Initially the dam was capable of containing 1,000,000 cubic metres (35,000,000 cu ft) of water. Today the dam has a capacity of 1,450,000 cubic metres (51,000,000 cu ft). In 1880, when the canal company went bankrupt, the dam was converted into a source of drinking water for the inhabitants of Rive-de-Gier. It delivers 245 litres (54 imp gal; 65 US gal) per second of water. The water serves 95% of the municipality of Rive-de-Gier, part of Châteauneuf, and since 2005 St-Martin-le-Plain and St. Joseph. As of 2010 19,678 people relied on the dam for water, as well as various industrial users such as Industeel.

== Other uses ==
A stretch of 3 kilometres (1.9 mi) below the dam is used for kayaking.

== Gallery ==
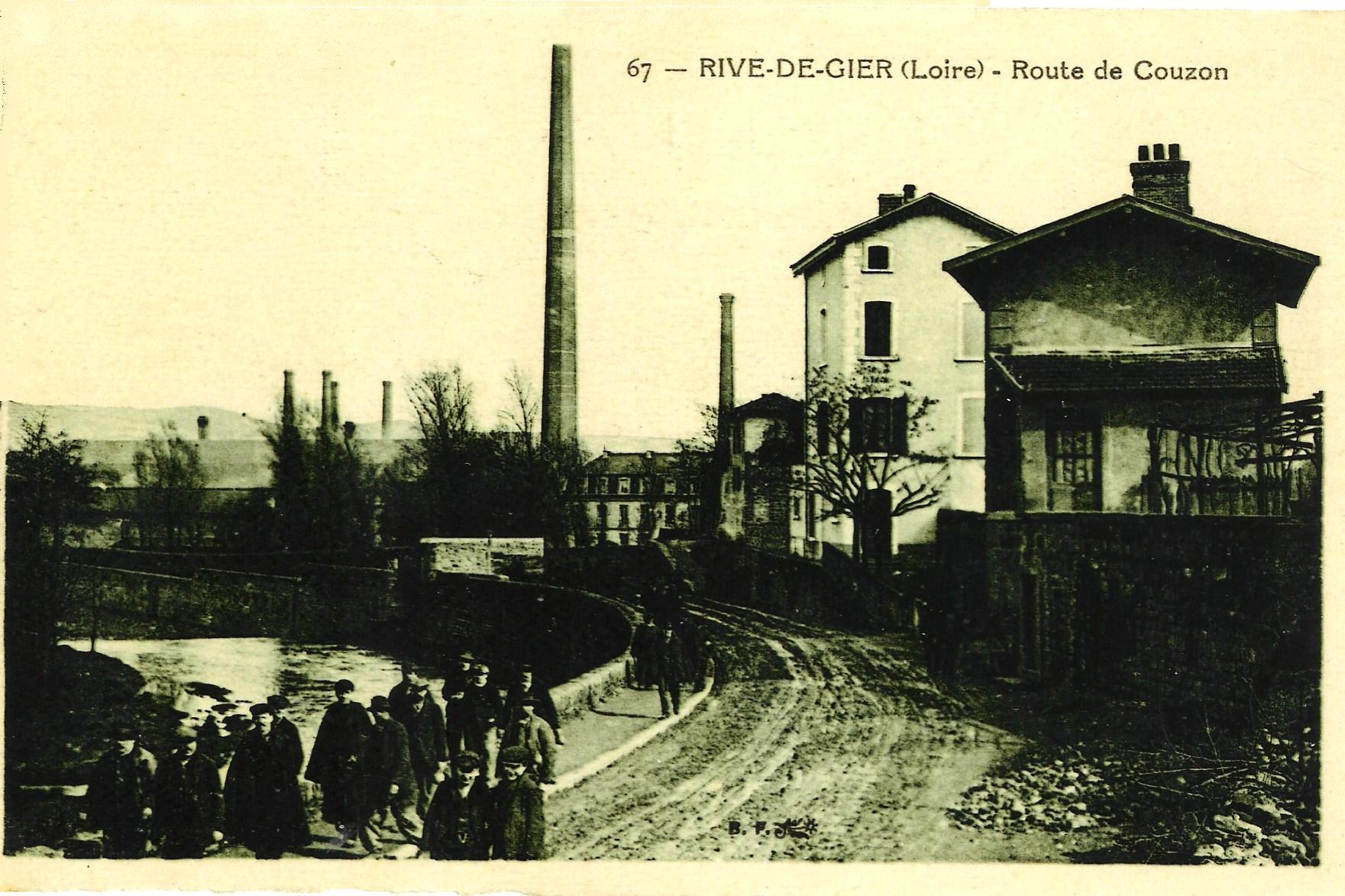
Route de Couzon in Rive-de-Gier start of the 20th century

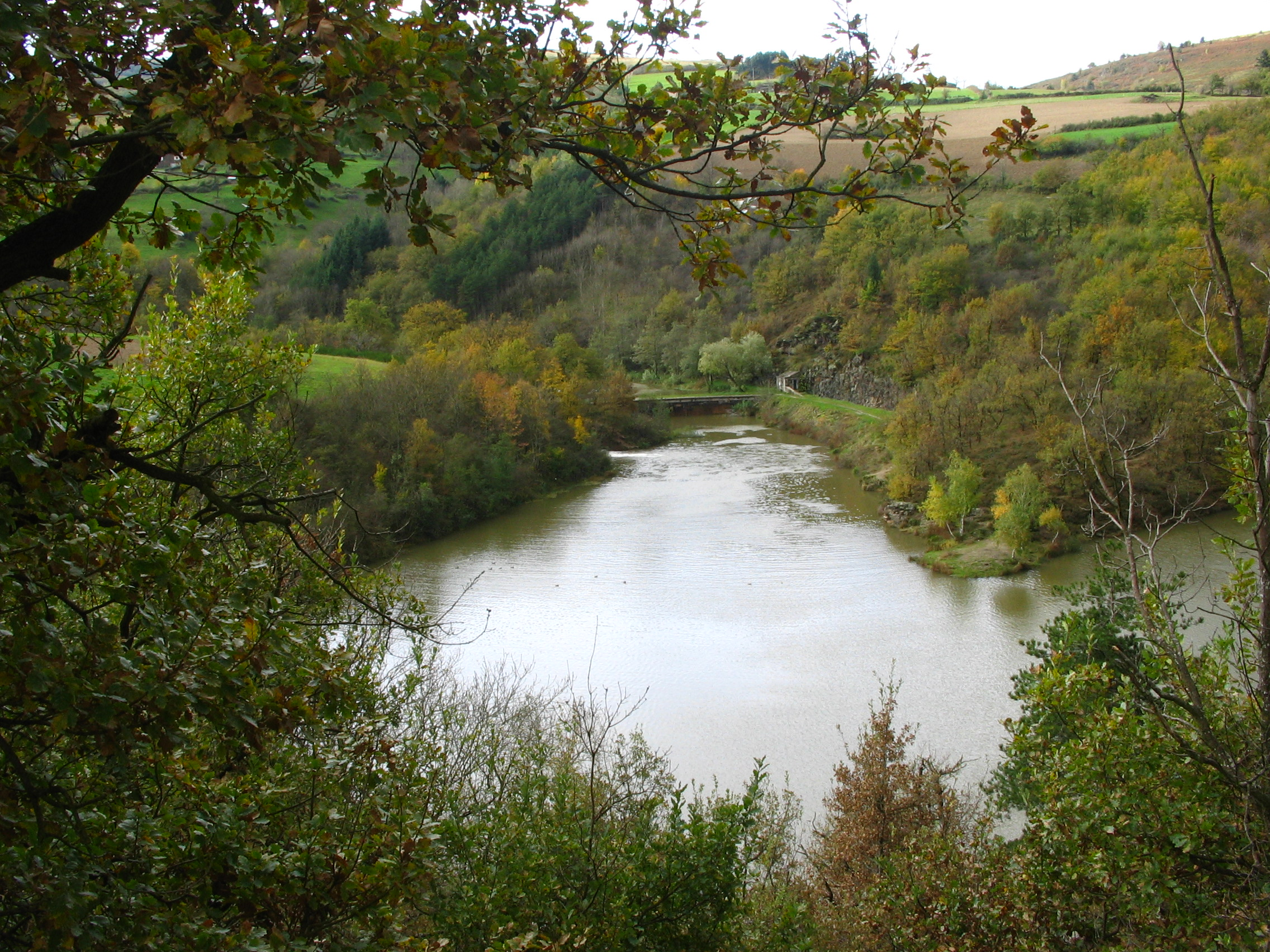
Reservoir of the Couzon dam in November 2008

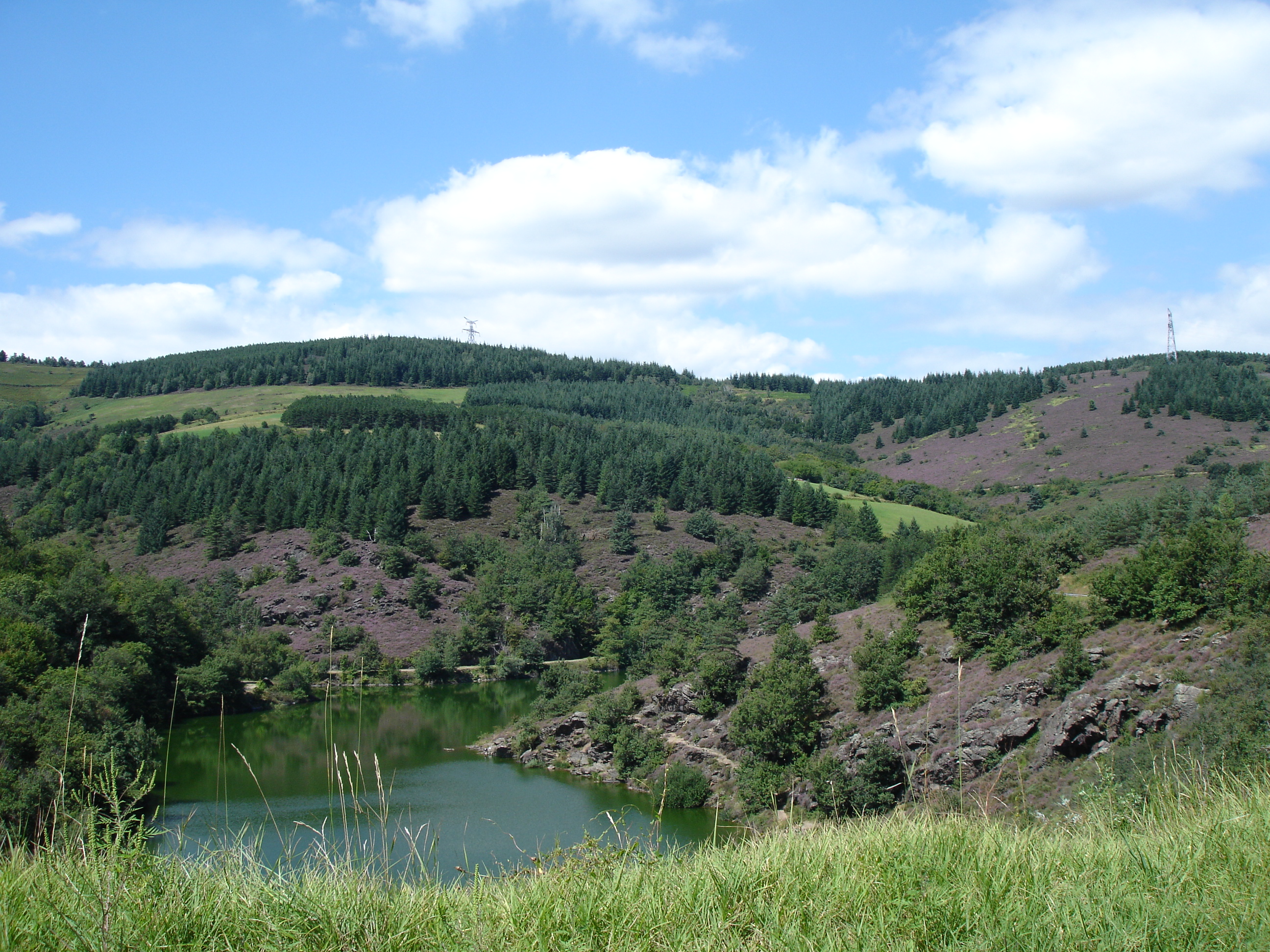
Country around the Couzon dam in August 2008
