= Canut revolts =

Early worker uprisings

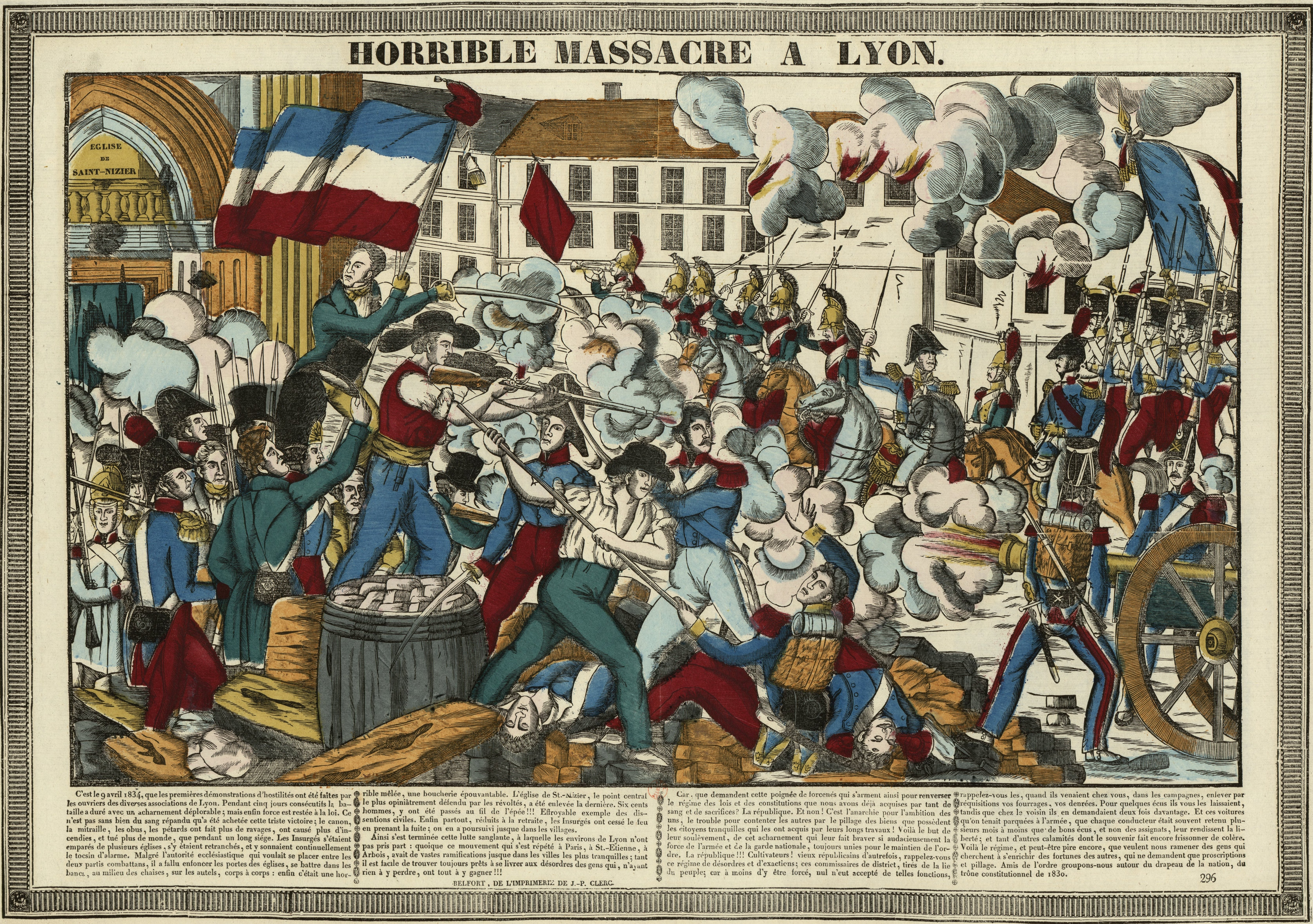
Suppression of the Second Canut revolt in April 1834

The Canut revolts (French: Révolte des canuts) is the collective name for the major revolts by Lyonnais silk workers (French: canuts) which occurred in 1831, 1834 and 1848. They were among the first well-defined worker uprisings of the period known as the Industrial Revolution.

The First Canut revolt in 1831 was provoked by a bad economy and a resultant drop in silk prices, which caused a drop in workers' wages. In an effort to maintain their standard of living, the workers tried to see a minimum price imposed on silk. The refusal of the manufacturers to pay this price infuriated the workers, who went into open revolt. They seized the arsenal and repulsed the local national guard and military in a bloody battle, which left the insurgents in control of the town. The government sent Marshal Jean-de-Dieu Soult, a veteran of the Napoleonic Wars, at the head of an army of 20,000 to restore order. Soult was able to retake the town without any bloodshed, and without making any compromises with the workers. Though some workers were arrested, all were eventually acquitted. The revolt ended with the minimum price abolished and with the workers no better off.

The Second Canut revolt in 1834 occurred in a prosperous economy that had caused a surge in workers' wages. Owners saw these wages as too high, so they attempted to impose a wage decrease. This combined with laws that oppressed Republican groups caused the workers to rebel. The government crushed the rebellion in a bloody battle and deported or imprisoned 10,000 insurgents.

A third insurrection occurred in 1848. Although it was as violent and was motivated by almost identical worker exploitation, 1848 was a year of revolution all over Europe and it did not acquire the same renown as that of 1831. Indeed, the revolt of 1831 encouraged many other worker revolts of the 19th century.

== Silk industry in Lyon at the beginning of the 19th century ==
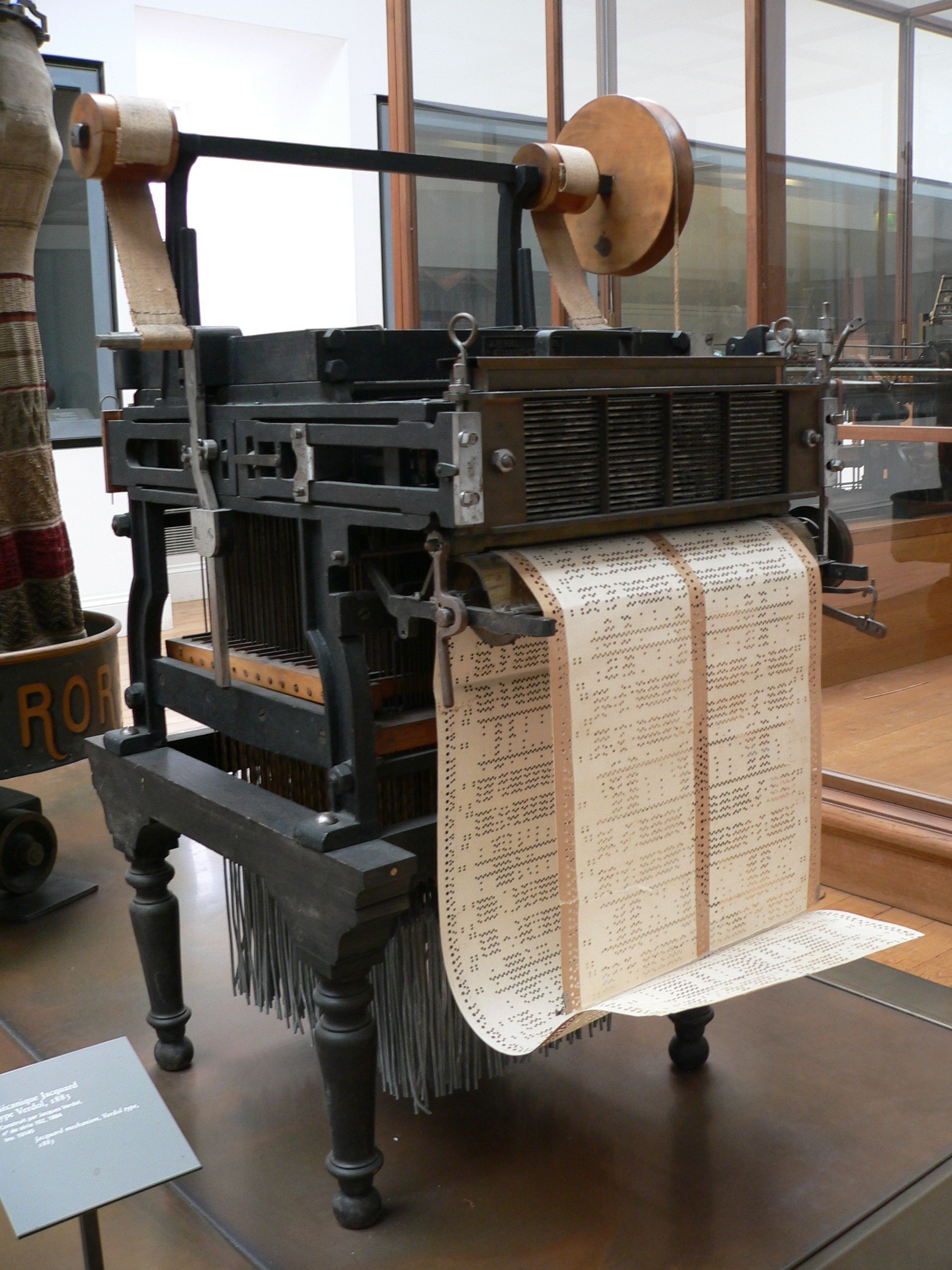
A Jacquard loom.

At the beginning of the 19th century, the textile industry was the main industrial activity of Lyon and the surrounding region. The livelihood of half of the population of Lyon was dependent on the silk weaving industry.

In 1831, the production of silk goods in Lyon was still organised in a manner similar to that of the pre-industrial era:

- At the top of the socio-economic pyramid was the grande fabrique (literally great manufacture), a group of about 1,400 bankers and traders named fabricants (manufacturers) or soyeux (silk workers), who controlled and financed the manufacture and commercialisation of the goods.
- The manufacturers contracted about 8,000 chief weaving craftsmen, the canuts, who were paid either for a specific order or per piece. The Canuts owned their own looms, generally between 2 and 6, depending on the size of the workshop.
- The Canuts employed about 30,000 apprentices, who were paid by the day, but generally lived with the canut, who lodged and fed them, and with whom they shared a similar standard of living.
- Women were also employed at a lesser salary, as were apprentices and errand boys. These workers filled a wide variety of professions: gareurs (mechanics who repair and adjust the looms), satinaires (women who prepare the satin), battandiers (who make the tools necessary for the weaving), metteurs en carte (who make the coded tables indicating the colour and characteristics of the silk to be used, according to the drawing provided by the customer), liseurs (who create the perforated cards for the Jacquard loom), magnanerelles (women working in the magnaneries—silk-raising farms), warpers are the "ourdisseuses", embroiderers, silk folders, spinners, ourdisseuses (women who prepare the warp of the piece to be woven prior to it being placed on the loom), dyers, etc.

While most of the workshops were situated in houses in the arrondissement of Pentes de la Croix-Rousse, some were also located in Saint-Georges, in Vieux Lyon, Bourgneuf, La Guillotière and Vaise. There was only one industrial grade factory, the silk factory of la Sauvagère, employing 600 workers, in Saint-Rambert-l'Île-Barbe.

The value of silk, as with any luxury product, depended on the economy. A large portion of the demand was from North America, and was very susceptible to competition and change. During the First French Empire, the government accepted, or at least tolerated, the price fixing done in Lyon. The increased revenue from price fixing allowed greater salaries throughout the system. After the economic crisis of 1825, with the support of Catholic royalists, the canuts and their companions had created mutual assistance societies.

== First revolt ==
The grim condition of the economy in 1831 drastically reduced the demand for silk goods. Salaries were continually being reduced, much less than their maximum during the economically prosperous years of the First French Empire.

On 18 October 1831, the canuts asked the prefect of the department of the Rhône, Louis Bouvier-Dumolart, to help them negotiate with the manufacturers. The canuts wanted a fixed price to be established, which would stop the further decrease of the price of silk goods. The prefect organised a group of owners and workers, which was able to establish a fixed rate on 26 October. A labour court, the Conseil de prud'hommes, was given the role of ensuring the rate was applied.

The intervention of the prefect was, however, poorly received by some manufacturers who considered his actions to be demagogic, and the concessions afforded by their representatives to be a sign of weakness. 104 of them refused to apply the rate, claiming it was against the principles of the French Revolution. Laws such as the Le Chapelier Law and the Allarde decree of 1791 established the principle of economic non-intervention by the state, in addition to explicitly banning guilds (a predecessor to trade unions), and denying the right to strike. The manufacturers claimed the fixed rate was contrary to freedom of enterprise. On 10 November, they rejected the salary claims of the canuts, which they considered to be exorbitant. This attitude infuriated much of the working class.

=== Insurrection ===
On 21 November 1831 several hundred weavers toured the then independent commune of Croix-Rousse. They forced the few weavers still at work to close their workshops, harassing the National Guard. Soon after they erected barricades and marched to Lyon with the black flag, which would later go on to become a symbol of Anarchism.

On 22 November in Lyon, the workers captured the fortified police barracks at Bon-Pasteur, pillaging the arsenal and stealing weapons in the process. Several units of the military guard and the national guard were attacked. The infantry attempted to stop them, but was forced to retreat under a hail of tiles and bullets. The national guard, most of which was recruited from amongst the canuts, changed sides, joining the insurgents.

After a bloody battle which caused about 600 casualties (100 dead, 263 injured on the military side, 69 dead, 140 injured on the civilian side), the insurgents captured the town. During the night of 22–23 November, General Roguet, commander of the 7th division and mayor Victor Prunelle fled the town.

The insurgents occupied the town hall. At this point, the leaders of the workers were unsure as to the further course of action, having started the strike with the sole intention of making sure the fixed rate on silken goods was being applied correctly. A few republicans in the group insisted on using the momentum to form a governmental committee. The committee did not make any definite decisions, due to a lack of agenda. Not helping the committee's effectiveness was the canuts' refusal to have their insurrection used for political purposes.

=== Return of order ===
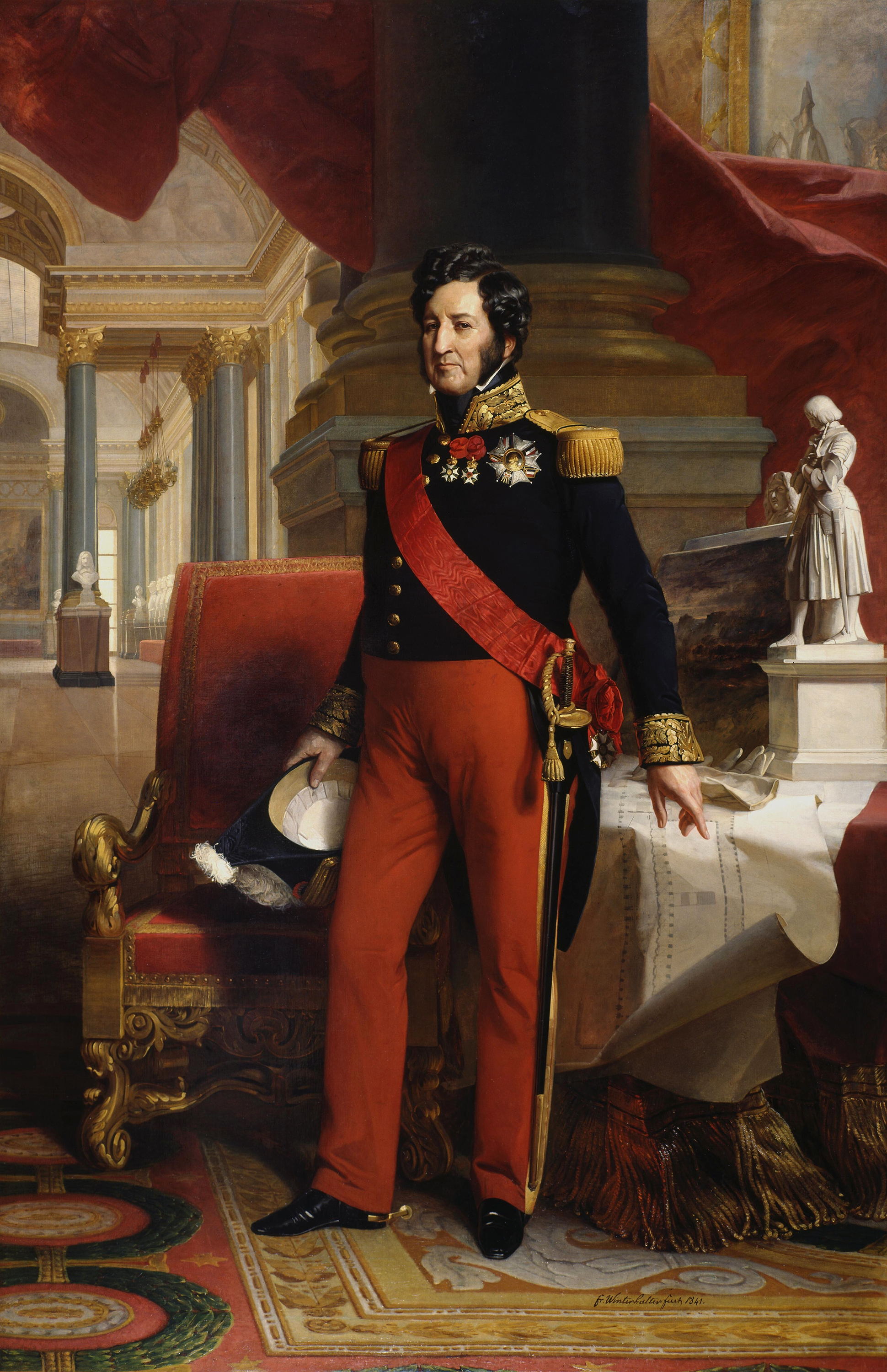
Portrait of Louis Philippe I by Franz Xaver Winterhalter, 1841

In Paris, the news of the riot and the occupation of France's second largest city caused astonishment and consternation. Debate raged in the Chamber of deputies and the opposition, led by François Mauguin, seized the opportunity to decry the incompetence of the ministers. The President of the Council of Ministers, Casimir Perier, whose government's first goal was to re-establish order after the July Revolution, thought otherwise. He blamed the troubles in Lyon on Saint-Simonianist propaganda and political manoeuvres by supporters of Charles X. King Louis-Philippe himself was quite sure that the problems were caused by republican actions. General Baudrand, aide de camp of Crown Prince Ferdinand Philippe, Duke of Orléans, wrote: "Poverty... [...] there are many exaggerations in what is said about it. It has been worse in other times and did not produce such results," which probably represented opinion in the Tuileries Palace.

On 25 November, Perier announced that Crown Prince Ferdinand Philippe, and Marshal Nicholas Soult, Minister of War and formerly one of Napoleon's most renowned marshals, would command an army of 20,000 soldiers to retake Lyon. King Louis-Philippe asked them to be strict, but to avoid the use of capital punishment. On 29 November 1831, he wrote to Soult: "The important point [...] is to enter Lyon without suffering any [major] blows and without agreeing to any conditions. [...] You will need to be strict. [...] [Y]et you know that when I say strict, I do not refer to execution, and it is not to you that I need say this." Louis-Philippe was very critical of the prefect, writing: "It is very clear, in my opinion, that he had a previously formed agreement with the leaders, and that he was not acting loyally to his government before the events." He nonetheless was cautious on the topic of the fixed rate, writing to his son: "The fixed rate is a delicate point on which I believe we must tread lightly and carefully weigh what we do. I can not give further advice because I lack sufficient information. You must say as little on the subject as possible."

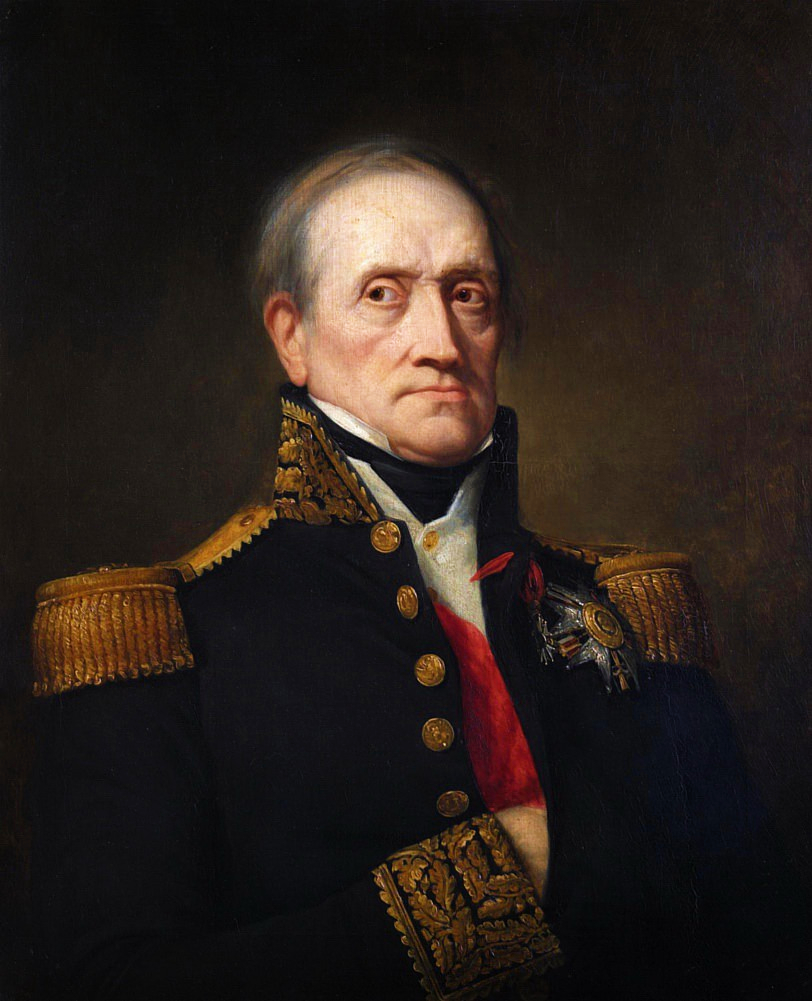
Portrait of Marshal Soult by George Peter Alexander Healy, 1840

On 28 November, the Duke of Orléans and Marshal Soult stopped at Trévoux, where they waited for order to return in Lyon. They entered the city on 3 December without any blood being shed and with no negotiation or agreements being made. The fixed rate was abolished, the prefect dismissed, the national guard disbanded, and a large garrison positioned in the town. The government decided to build a fort to separate the commune of Croix-Rousse from the town of Lyon. 90 workers were arrested, 11 of whom were prosecuted and acquitted in June 1832.

Soult informed the king of the success of his mission, attributing all the praise to "recognition of the king and the prince" and, where it was lacking, to an "expression of sadness which was obviously a testimony of repentance." He noted that all the authorities came to "pay homage to His Highness," and that all had prepared very good speeches, with the exception of the archbishop, Jean Paul Gaston de Pins, who was content saying he had "nothing but prayers to offer."

From 17 to 20 December 1831, the far left opposition parties tried to bring the situation in Lyon back to the forefront in the Chamber of Deputies. Casimir Perier declared that the revolt had wanted to arm itself "against the freedom of commerce and industry," and affirmed on 26 December that "society will not let itself be threatened with impunity". The cabinet's motion was passed quickly by a large majority, continuing to the day's agenda despite the protests and demand for an enquiry by the far left.

== Second revolt ==
After the failure of the 1831 revolt, the Parisian republicans sent agents to Lyon. They were able to create a large network of secret societies, often working closely with labour associations for silk craftsmen.

At the end of 1833, good economic prospects and conditions caused a boom in the Lyonnais silk industry. As a result, the government thought the chances of a second revolt extremely unlikely. The Interior Minister, the Count of Argout, wrote to the king on 9 September 1833: "I have just received M. Fulchiron, who comes from Lyon. The manufacture is in a state of simply fabulous prosperity. The orders from America are immense. The workers earn 6 to 7 francs per day. This is too much. They are, however, in a state of tranquillity as one may easily conceive." On 1 February 1834, an attempt by a few hundred Italian, German and Polish revolutionaries from Geneva and Grenoble was made to start a republican coup in Savoy. D'Argout told the king: "They are Savoyards who have recently come to Grenoble, and a few French republicans. M. de Gasparin writes to me that 1,200 inhabitants of Lyon had made plans to support the movement in Savoy should it have succeeded." The republicans intended to create a revolutionary climate, taking advantage of a salary conflict caused by high worker wages.

In February 1834, owners began to agree that workers' salaries had increased too much, and they began an attempt to impose a reduction. The results of this were conflict and strikes, the leaders of which were arrested and tried. Their trial began on 5 April, while the Chamber of Peers were discussing a law which would intensify the repression of republican groups. The Republicans managed to amalgamate several political parties to fall within the scope of this law, as did the mutual workers' associations to which Lyon's canuts belonged. As a result, thousands of craftsmen rebelled on 9 April. The leaders proclaimed daily agendas, which they dated not "9 April 1834," but instead "22 Germinal, year XLII of the Republic," using the French Republican Calendar.

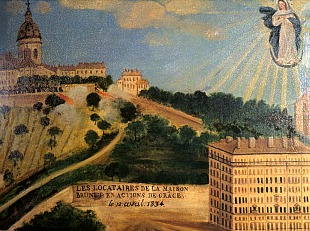
The bombardment of Brunet House in Croix-Rousse. Oil on canvas.

The army occupied the town and bridges. Soon after, gunfire began, with troops firing on an unarmed crowd. Barricades were erected quickly throughout the town to hinder the army's progress. The disorganised workers stormed the Bon-Pasteur barracks, the same as during the first revolt, and again plundered the arsenal. The workers barricaded the different districts of the city, including Croix-Rousse, effectively creating fortified camps. What would be known later as the Sanglante semaine (bloody week) had begun.

Adolphe Thiers, the Interior Minister, would use a tactic that he would later reuse in 1871 to defeat the Paris Commune: retreat from the town, abandon it to the insurgents, surround it, then take it back.

On 10 April, more shots were exchanged between the insurgents and the troops. The workers occupied the telegraph office, the Guillotière quarter, and then the nearby city of Villeurbanne where military barracks were captured. Black flags were flown over the arrondissements Fourvière, Saint-Nizier and Antiquaille. Fighting continued on 11 April; Croix Rousse was bombarded by the recently reinforced military, while revolts started in the more distant cities of Saint-Étienne and Vienne. On 12 April, the troops attacked and re-took the Guillotière quarter, after having destroyed numerous houses by artillery. On 14 April, the army reconquered the town piece by piece, attacking Croix-Rousse for the third time.

15 April was the end of the Sanglante semaine in Lyon, the second canut rebellion having been suppressed. Conservative estimates of the number of casualties were between 100 and 200, while more liberal estimates were more than 600. 10,000 captured insurgents were tried in a "gigantic trial" in Paris during April 1835, and were condemned to deportation or strict prison sentences. The July Monarchy suspected the intrigues of other groups, such as legitimists or Bonapartists, at work, which accounted for the harsh repression of the revolt.

== Third revolt ==
A third insurrection occurred in 1848. Although it was as violent and was motivated by almost identical worker conditions, 1848 was a year of revolution all over Europe and it did not acquire the same renown as that of 1831. Indeed, the revolt of 1831 encouraged many other worker revolts of the 19th century.

== Consequences ==
In 1836 the Rive-de-Gier poet Guillaume Roquille wrote Breyou et so disciplo, an account of the revolt in the Franco-Provençal language. Although it was apparently accurate, he was prosecuted for his publication. The canut revolts caused the emergence of a sense of shared interests in workers' communities. It began an era of social claims, that would be accentuated by the living conditions of the workers during this time of emerging capitalism, as attested by the famous memoirs of doctor Louis René Villermé at the Académie des sciences morales et politiques.

They later influenced the rebellion that resulted in the brief Paris Commune, which in turn influenced much of the socialist, communist and anarchistic philosophies of the present.

In 1834, Franz Liszt wrote the piano piece "Lyon" from his collection Album d'un voyageur (S.156), which contains a motto from that time: "Vivre en travaillant ou mourir en combattant." He dedicated the piece to Lamennais.

== See also ==
- History of Lyon
- Barthélemy Thimonnier§Sewing machine riot
