= Charles Bossut =

French mathematician

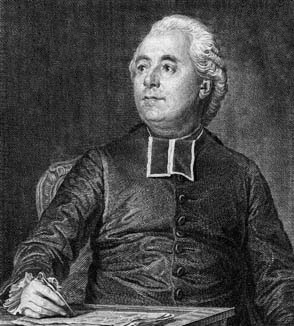
- Born: 11 August 1730; Tartaras, Loire, France
- Died: 14 January 1814 (aged 83); Paris, France
- Scientific career
- Fields: Mathematics

Charles Bossut (11 August 1730 – 14 January 1814) was a French mathematician and confrère of the Encyclopaedists.

== Early life and education ==
Bossut was born in 1730 in Tartaras, Loire to Barthélemy Bossut and Jeanne Thonnerine. He lost his father early in life and was raised by his uncle. He received his education at the Jesuit College of Lyon from age fourteen, under the influence of Père Béraud, who also mentored mathematicians such as Jean-Étienne Montucla and Jérôme Lalande.

== Career ==
After completing his studies, Bossut followed a path in the Church, becoming known as Abbé Charles Bossut. He delved into mathematical research, collaborating with contemporaries such as Jean le Rond d'Alembert, Alexis Clairaut, and Charles Étienne Louis Camus. In 1753, he became a correspondent at the French Academy of Sciences.

By the age of 21, he was appointed professor of mathematics at the École du Génie in Mézières, where he enhanced the course quality and taught future mathematicians, including Jean-Charles de Borda and Charles-Augustin de Coulomb.

Bossut's research in mechanics and resistance to planetary motion earned recognition from the French Academy of Sciences, resulting in multiple Grand Prix awards. He played a pivotal role in guiding Gaspard Monge's career, who later succeeded him at Mézières.

In the 1760s, Bossut authored textbooks, notably Traité élémentaire de mécanique (1763) and Cours complet de mathématiques (1765). He also served as an examiner at Mézières and later at the École Polytechnique.

In 1774, Bossut was appointed to a newly established chair of hydrodynamics at the Louvre, a position he held until 1780. During this time, he conducted fluid resistance experiments and edited an edition of Pascal's works.

Bossut's later works include contributing to Diderot's Encyclopédie méthodique and publishing Mécanique en général (1792) and Essai sur l'histoire générale des mathématiques (1802). In his later years, Bossut became reclusive and remained unmarried. Nonetheless, he received accolades from several scientific academies, including those in Lyon, Toulouse, St Petersburg, Turin, and Bologna, for his contributions to mathematics.

== Works ==
- Traité élémentaire d'hydrodynamique (1771) later reworked as Traité théorique et expérimental d'hydrodynamique (1786–87)
- Traité élémentaire de méchanique statique (1772)
- Traité élémentaire de mechanique et de dinamique (in Italian). Vol. 1. Pavia: Stamperia del Monastero di S. Salvatore. 1788.
- Traité élémentaire de mechanique et de dinamique (in Italian). Vol. 2. Pavia: Stamperia del Monastero di S. Salvatore. 1788.
- Cours de mathématiques (1781)
- Histoire générale des mathématiques (1810)

Did write parts of the Encyclopédie on mathematics with Jean le Rond d'Alembert. 1768 member of Académie des sciences

== See also ==
- History of fluid mechanics
