= Seguin & Co. =

Seguin & Co. was a company based near Lyon, France. The company was involved in several business activities, the first of which was textiles but it was best known for having developed the first suspension bridges in Continental Europe and France's first commercial railway company, the Saint-Étienne–Lyon railway.

== Philanthropy ==
The family, led by brothers Camille and Marc, gave its railway assets to the people of France, fearing that it could turn into a monopoly and not serve the greater public good.

== Marc Seguin ==
The best known member of Seguin & Co. was French inventor Marc Seguin, father of the tubular steam-engine boiler and the cable (using thin wires) suspension bridge system in continental Europe.

== Louis Seguin ==
One notable offshoot of Seguin & Co. is Gnome et Rhône founded by Louis Seguin in 1900, a major French aircraft engine manufacturer (now SAFRAN).
