= Gier (river) =

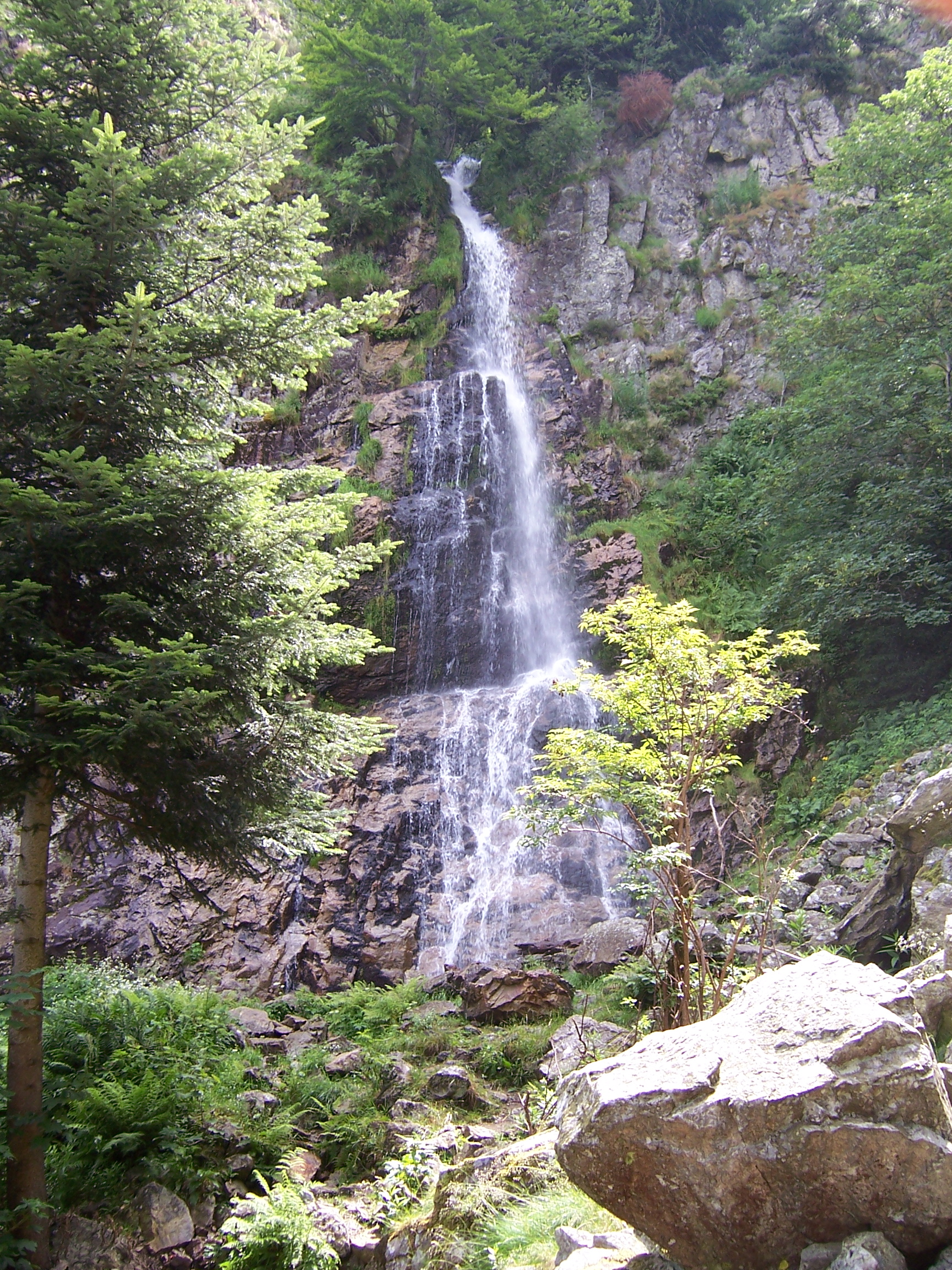
- Le saut du Gier waterfalls

- Location within France Location within Auvergne-Rhône-Alpes

Location
- Country: France
- Region: Auvergne-Rhône-Alpes

Physical characteristics
- Source
  - location: Mont Pilat
  - elevation: 1,300 m (4,300 ft)
- Mouth: Rhône
  - location: Givors
  - elevation: 145 m (476 ft)
- Length: 40.3 km (25.0 mi)
- Basin size: 417 km^{2} (161 sq mi)
- Discharge
  - average: 3.16 m^{3}/s (112 cu ft/s)

Basin features
- Progression: Rhône→ Mediterranean Sea

The Gier (French pronunciation: [ʒje]) is a French river that flows in a northeast direction through the Loire and Rhône departments. It is a tributary of the Rhône, which it enters from the right bank. The Gier valley was formerly heavily industrialized with coal and iron mines and factories.

== Name ==
The word "Gier" derives from the Latin Jaresis, which also gave rise to the name côté Jarez for the north side of the valley of the Gier, and is included in the names of several municipalities: Sainte-Croix-en-Jarez, Saint-Paul-en-Jarez, Saint-Romain-en-Jarez, La Tour-en-Jarez, Saint-Christo-en-Jarez, Rive-de-Gier and Saint-Romain-en-Gier.

== Geography ==
Location in France

The Gier rises at La Jasserie on the Perdrix mountain at about 1,300 metres (4,300 ft) in the Pilat massif. The "Saut du Gier" waterfall near the head of the river is in the Pilat Regional Natural Park. The river runs for 40.3 kilometres (25.0 mi) before joining the Rhône at Givors. The Gier receives the Janon from its left at Saint-Chamond. The Janon from Terrenoire (now part of Saint-Étienne) to Saint-Chamond, and then the Gier from Saint-Chamond to Givors, create a valley in the coal basin between the Pilat massif to the south and the Riverie chain of the Monts du Lyonnais to the north.

The right (south) side of the valley is mountainous, mainly covered with trees or pasture, with relatively few people. The right bank streams flow from the Pilat massif. They are the Janon, upstream Gier, Onzion, Dorlay, Egarande, Couzon, Grand Malval, Mezerin and Combe de l'Enfer. The largest are the upstream Gier with a basin of about 52 square kilometres (20 sq mi), the Dorlay with a basin of 50 square kilometres (19 sq mi), the Couzon with a basin of 34 square kilometres (13 sq mi) and the Janon with a basin of 33 square kilometres (13 sq mi).

The left (north) side of the valley is hilly, sandy terrain. The left bank streams flow from the Monts du Lyonnais. They are the Langonand, which flows into the Janon, Mornante, Ruisseau des Arcs, Faverge, Durèze, Collenon, Féloin and Bozançon. The largest are the Durèze with a basin of about 29 square kilometres (11 sq mi) and the Bozançon with a basin of about 30 square kilometres (12 sq mi). The Bozançon defines the border on the Jarez side between the Loire and Rhone departments.

The Gier basin has a total area of about 420 square kilometres (160 sq mi). There are dams on the upper Gier, the Dorlay and the Couzon.

== Hydrology ==
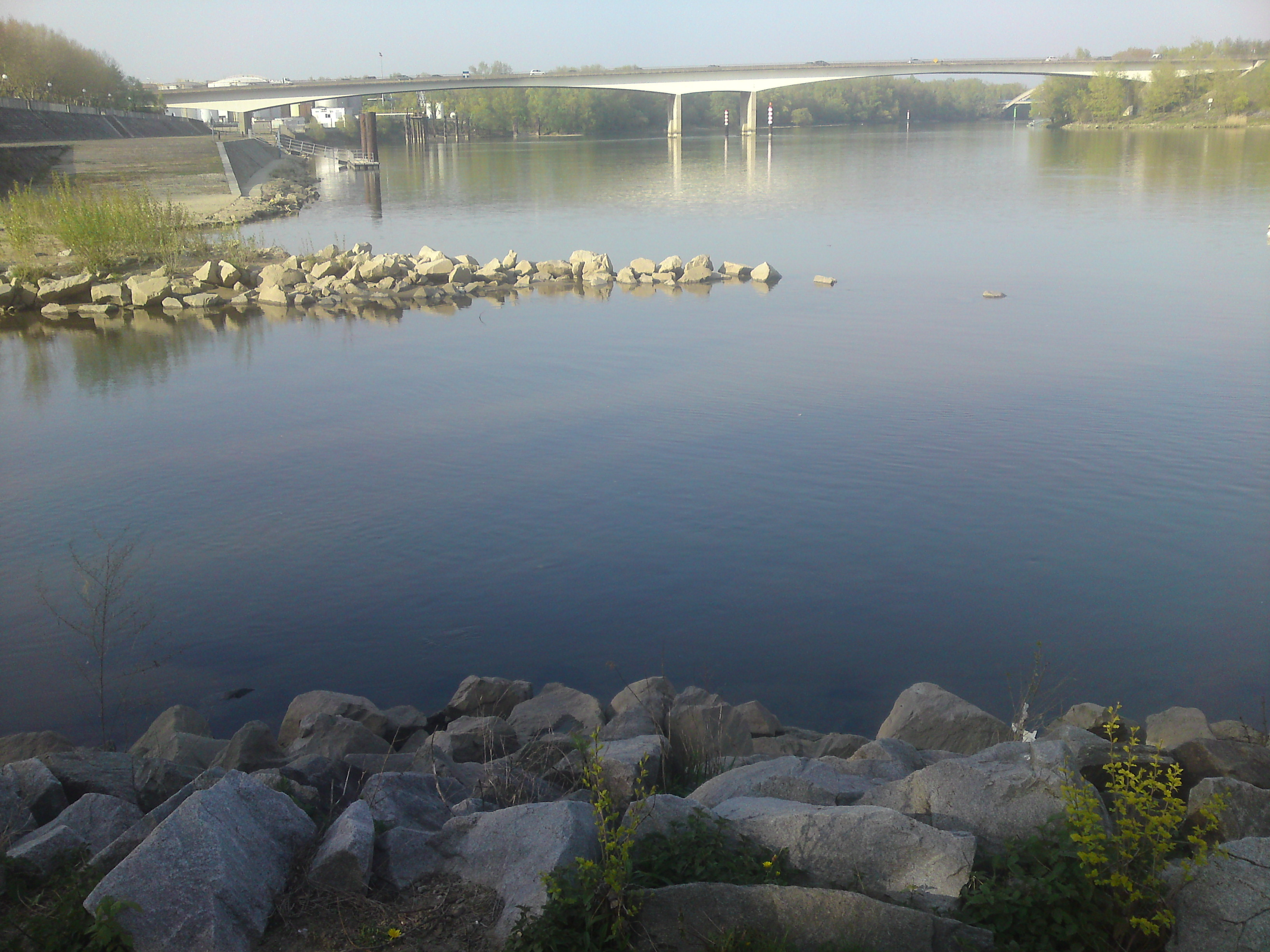
Le Gier at its confluence with the Rhône at Givors

The throughput of the Gier was observed over a period of 45 years (1964–2008) at Givors, a city of the Rhône department located at the confluence of the Rhône. The watershed of the river is 406 square kilometres (157 sq mi). The average rainfall in the Gier watershed is 218 millimetres (8.6 in) annually, much lower than the overall average for France. The average flow of the river is 3.16 cubic metres (112 cu ft) per second.

Gier has seasonal fluctuations typical of rivers of the French Massif Central that are partly fed by melting snow. High waters are in winter and spring, and the average monthly flow is 3.54 to 4.37 cubic metres (125 to 154 cu ft) per second from November to May, with a maximum in November followed by a second peak in May. Flow is lower in summer, from July to September, with a decrease of the average monthly rate to the level of 1.14 cubic metres (40 cu ft) in August. Flow can drop as low as .03 cubic metres (1.1 cu ft) in a dry year.

Significant floods are quite common. J. B. Chambeyron, the historian of Rive-de-Gier, talks of a flood in 1684 where the waters from Saint-Chamond to Givors rose to the first floor above ground level. The maximum instantaneous flow recorded was 338 cubic metres (11,900 cu ft) per second on 2 December 2003, while the maximum daily value was 208 cubic metres (7,300 cu ft) the same day. During the night of 1–2 November 2008 the center of Rive-de-Gier was devastated by flooding, as were many surrounding towns such as Saint-Romain-en-Gier and Givors. The water reached a depth of 1 to 2 metres (3 ft 3 in to 6 ft 7 in) in some streets, and many shops were flooded.

== History ==
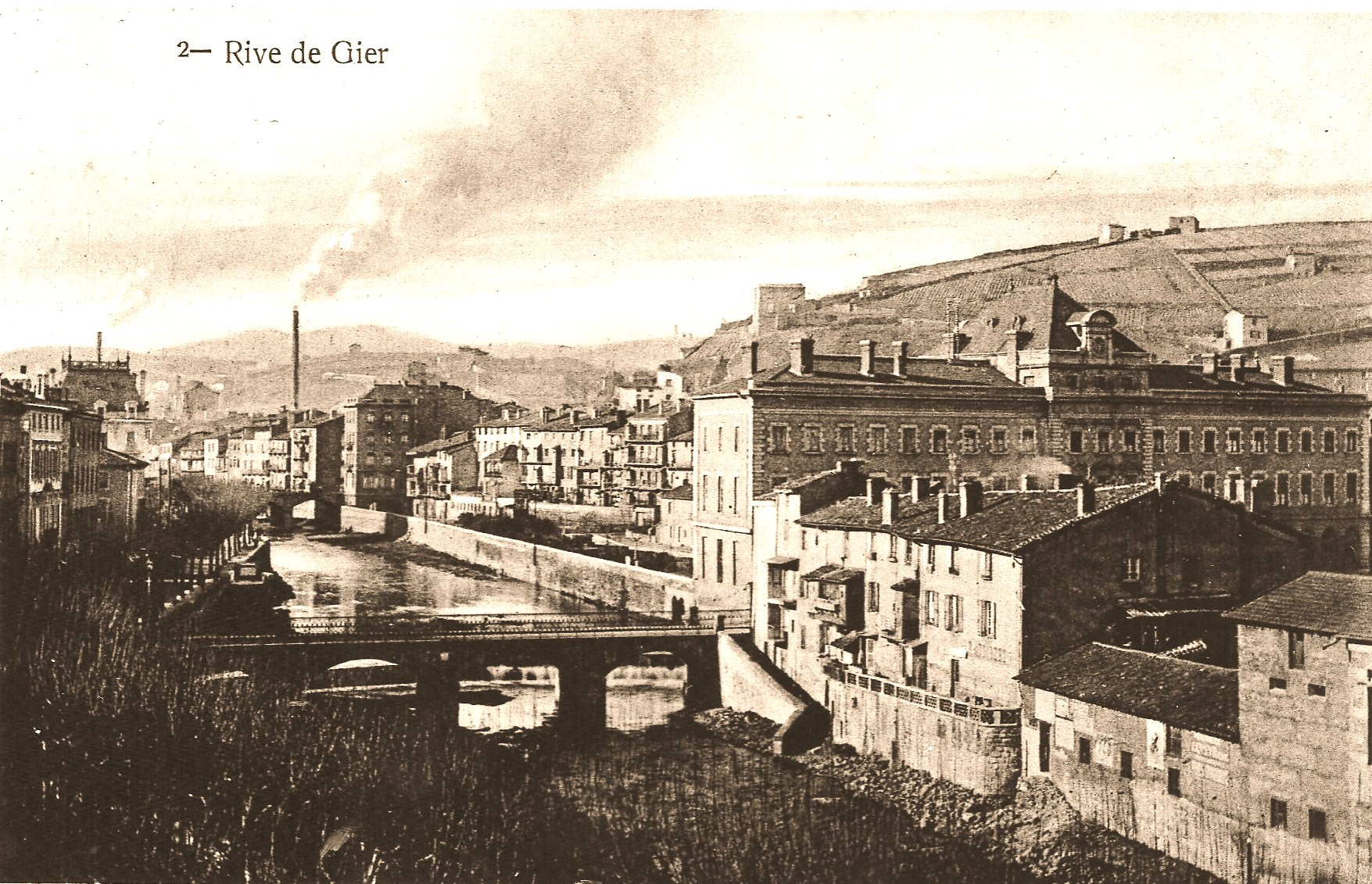
Rive-de-Gier around 1900, with the Gier running through the town

In Roman times the river was used to supply water to Lugdunum (old Lyon) through the aqueduct of the Gier.

The opening of the Givors canal from Rive-de-Gier to Givors in 1781 contributed to the early industrialization of the valley. The Saint-Étienne–Lyon railway was opened in 1833, the first French railway open to travelers. It follows the path of the Janon from Terrenoire to Saint-Chamond, and then the Gier to the Rhone. In the 19th and 20th centuries the Gier brought water and energy to many factories in the Gier valley. In the 19th century these ranged from factories making silk and lace products to steel mills.

The Barrage du Piney, a dam, was built on the Gier at 45.425632°N 4.527321°E near La Valla-en-Gier between 1953 and 1955, with a capacity of 1,900,000 cubic metres (67,000,000 cu ft). It is no longer in service and is kept permanently empty. The Barrage de Soulages, another dam, was built on the Gier at 45.437934°N 4.51221°E between 1968 and 1970, with a capacity of 2,600,000 cubic metres (92,000,000 cu ft).

== Urbanization ==
The main axis of the Gier valley today holds an almost continuous urban and industrial area from Terrenoire in Saint-Étienne to Givors on the Rhone. The main towns from west to east, with their 2010 populations, are Saint-Chamond (35,793), La Grand-Croix (5,070), Lorette (4,498), Rive-de-Gier (14,996) and Givors (19,118). The 12 towns along the river valley totaled 88,974 inhabitants in 2008. The Gier is partly covered over in Saint-Chamond.
