= Monts du Lyonnais =

Mountains in France

Coordinates: 45°39′N 4°32′E

The Monts du Lyonnais are a range of low-altitude mountains and eastern foothills of the Massif Central located in the Loire and Rhône departments in France.

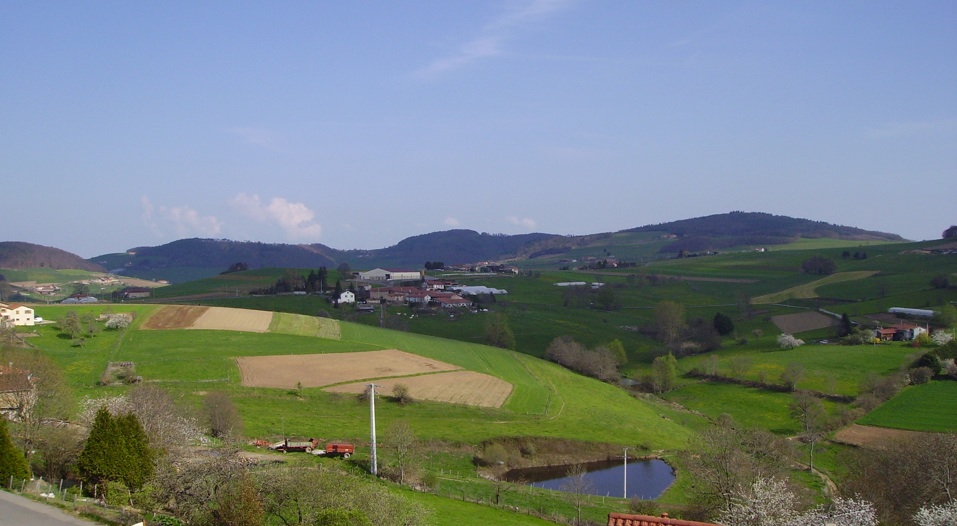
Typical landscape of the Monts du Lyonnais

== Geography ==
The monts du Lyonnais' highest summit is the crêt Malherbe (946 m).

The Janon river running east from Terrenoire (now part of Saint-Étienne) and then the Gier continuing east from Saint-Chamond to meet the Rhone at Givors create a valley in the coal basin that separates Mont Pilat from the Monts du Lyonnais.
