= Sainte-Croix-en-Jarez =

- Commune
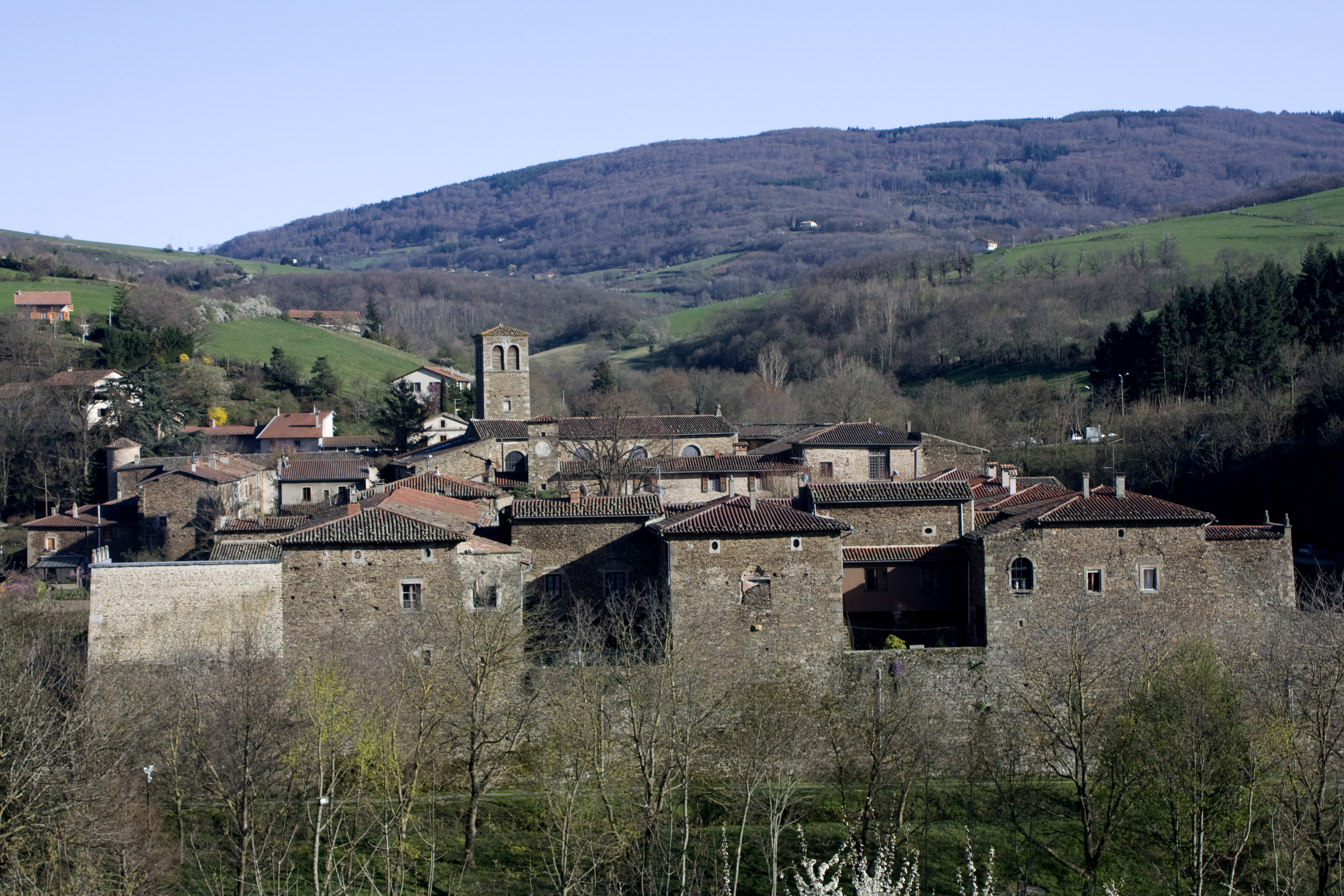
- Priory

- Coat of arms
- Location of Sainte-Croix-en-Jarez
- Location within France Location within Auvergne-Rhône-Alpes
- Coordinates: 45°28′49″N 4°38′52″E
- Country: France
- Region: Auvergne-Rhône-Alpes
- Department: Loire
- Arrondissement: Saint-Étienne
- Canton: Le Pilat
- Intercommunality: Saint-Étienne Métropole

Government
  - Mayor (2020–2026): Daniel Torgues
- Area^{1}: 12 km^{2} (4.6 sq mi)
- Highest elevation: 955 m (3,133 ft)
- Lowest elevation: 349 m (1,145 ft)
- Population (2023): 480
  - Density: 40/km^{2} (100/sq mi)
- Time zone: UTC+01:00 (CET)
  - Summer (DST): UTC+02:00 (CEST)
- INSEE/Postal code: 42210 /42800
- ^{1} French Land Register data, which excludes lakes, ponds, glaciers > 1 km^{2} (0.386 sq mi or 247 acres) and river estuaries.

Sainte-Croix-en-Jarez (French pronunciation: [sɛ̃t kʁwa ɑ̃ ʒaʁɛ]) is a commune in the Loire department in central France. It is a member of Les Plus Beaux Villages de France (The Most Beautiful Villages of France) Association.

== Population ==
Historical population
Year	Pop.	±% p.a.
1968	274	—
1975	310	+1.78%
1982	342	+1.41%
1990	329	−0.48%
1999	351	+0.72%
2007	418	+2.21%
2012	427	+0.43%
2017	478	+2.28%
2023	480	+0.07%
Source: INSEE

== See also ==
- Communes of the Loire department
