= Saint-Romain-en-Gier =

- Commune
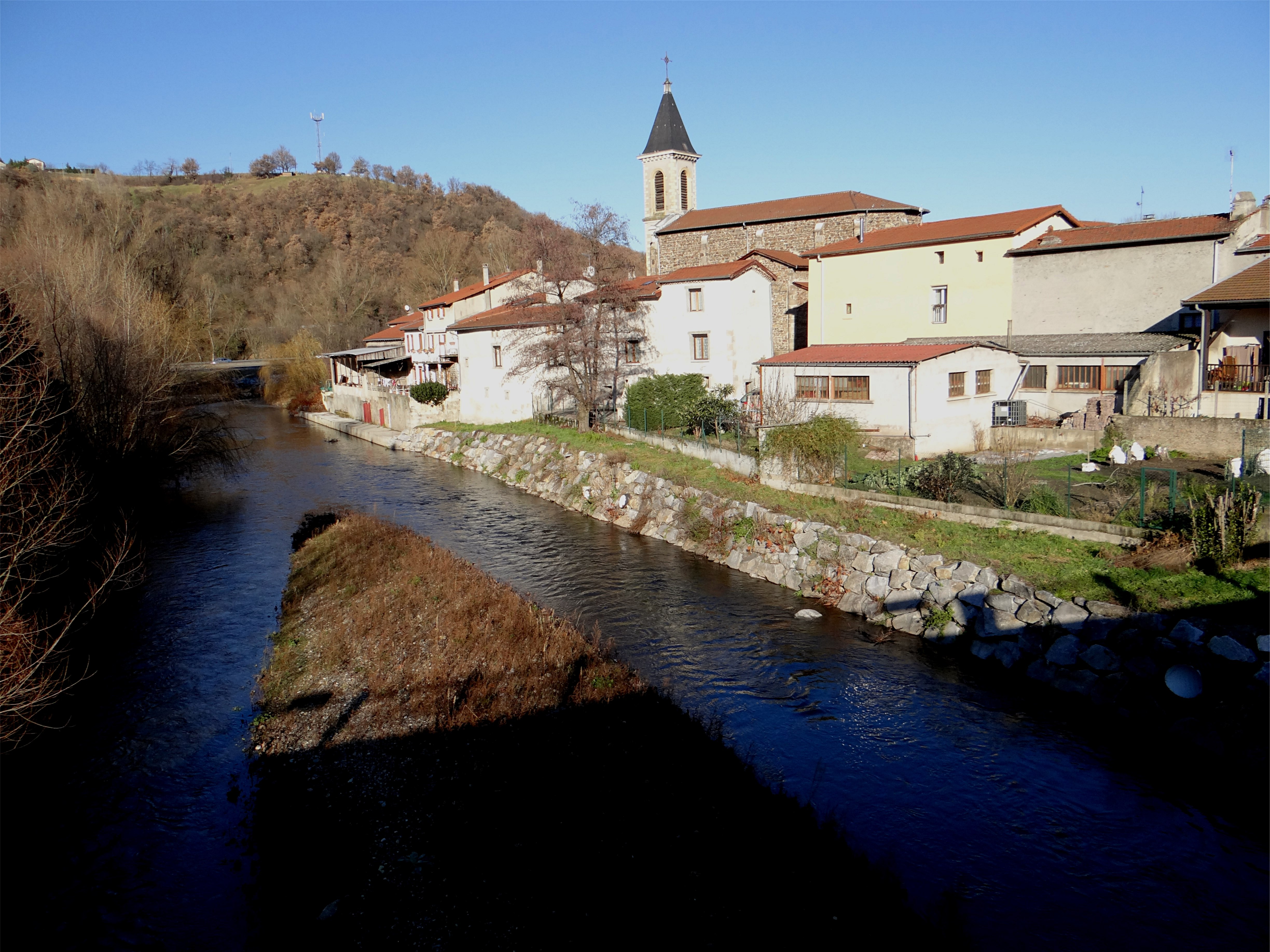
- The village seen from the bridge on the Gier
- Location of Saint-Romain-en-Gier
- Location within France Location within Auvergne-Rhône-Alpes
- Coordinates: 45°33′58″N 4°42′27″E
- Country: France
- Region: Auvergne-Rhône-Alpes
- Department: Rhône
- Arrondissement: Lyon
- Canton: Mornant
- Intercommunality: CA Vienne Condrieu

Government
  - Mayor (2020–2026): Virginie Ostojic
- Area^{1}: 4.05 km^{2} (1.56 sq mi)
- Elevation: 250 m (820 ft)
- Highest elevation: 325 m (1,066 ft)
- Lowest elevation: 175 m (574 ft)
- Population (2023): 600
  - Density: 150/km^{2} (380/sq mi)
- Demonym(s): Saint-Romanais, Saint-Romanaise
- Time zone: UTC+01:00 (CET)
  - Summer (DST): UTC+02:00 (CEST)
- INSEE/Postal code: 69236 /69700
- ^{1} French Land Register data, which excludes lakes, ponds, glaciers > 1 km^{2} (0.386 sq mi or 247 acres) and river estuaries.

Saint-Romain-en-Gier (French pronunciation: [sɛ̃ ʁɔmɛ̃ ɑ̃ ʒje]) is a commune in the Rhône department in eastern France. It lies on both sides of the Gier river

== Heraldry ==
Saint-Romain-en-Gier	Argent, a cross estrée azure, the crossbar lowered, cantoned in the 1st with a lion contourné gules, in the 2nd with a bunch of grapes purpure stalked and leaved vert, in the 3rd with a key contourné sable placed bendwise and in the fourth with wavy azure in number.

== Demography ==
Historical population
Year	Pop.	±% p.a.
1968	465	—
1975	408	−1.85%
1982	477	+2.26%
1990	511	+0.86%
1999	512	+0.02%
2007	483	−0.73%
2012	520	+1.49%
2017	579	+2.17%
2023	600	+0.60%
Source: INSEE

== See also ==
- Communes of the Rhône department
