= Breguet 763 Deux-Ponts =

French heavy airliner with 4 piston engines, 1949

Deux-Ponts / Provence / Sahara / Universel
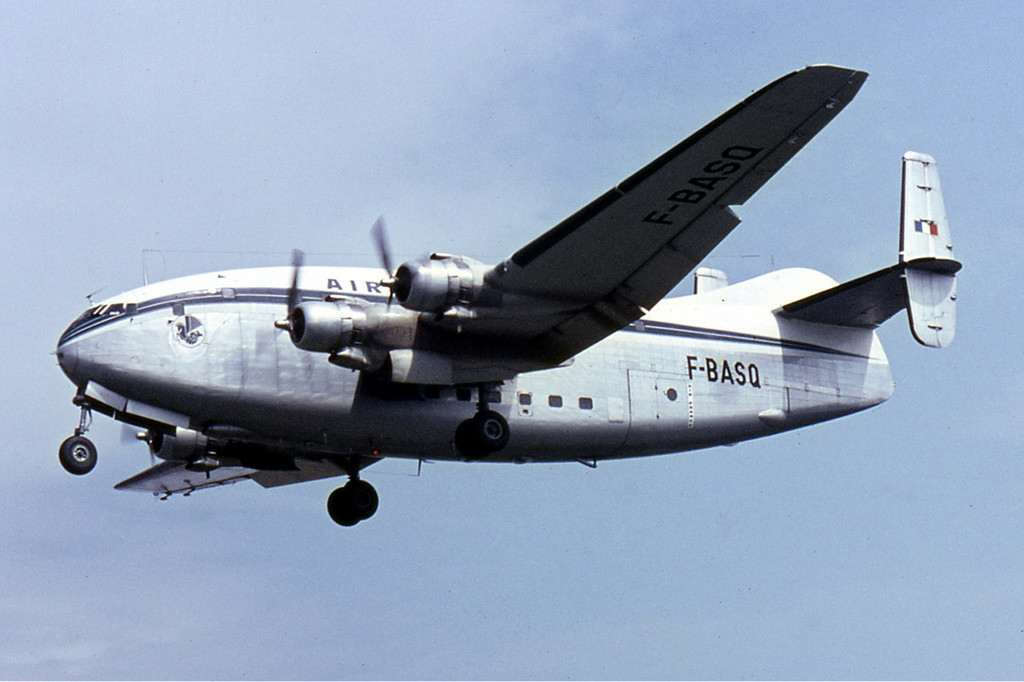
- Air France Br.763 Deux Ponts

General information
- Type: Airliner and freighter
- Manufacturer: Breguet Aviation
- Primary users: Air France French Air Force
- Number built: 20

History
- Introduction date: 10 March 1953
- First flight: 15 February 1949
- Retired: 31 March 1971

The Breguet 761/763/765 are a family of 1940s and 1950s French double-deck transport aircraft produced by Breguet Aviation. The aircraft were normally called the Deux-Ponts (Double-Decker) but it was not an official name.

== Design and development ==
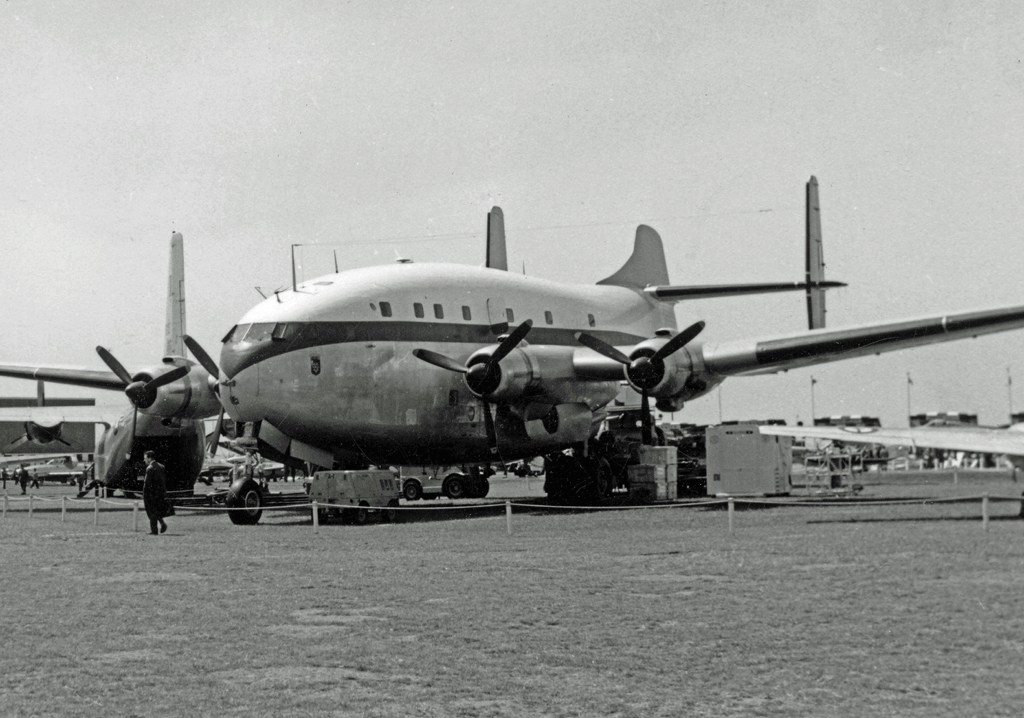
The third Breguet Br.761S at the 1957 Paris Air Show fitted with the early central fin shape

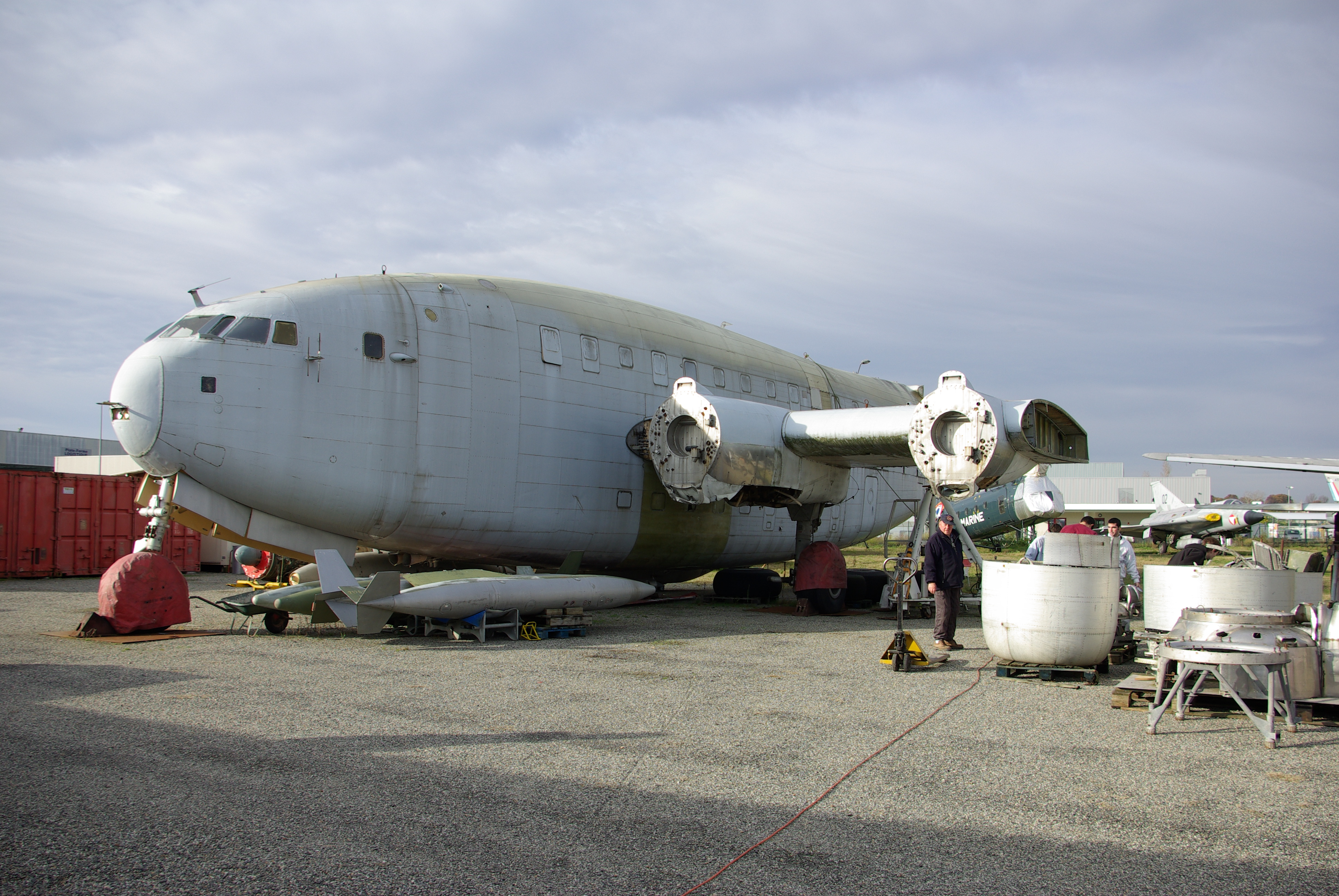
Breguet 765 Sahara under restoration at Musée des Ailes Anciennes in Toulouse (2008)

Breguet began design work on the Breguet 761 double-deck airliner even before the end of the Second World War, in 1944. It was decided that a medium-range airliner with seating for over 100 passengers would be built. The design envisaged using readily available engines with the aim of ease of manufacture and an early first-flight date. The design was known as Project 76-1. The aircraft was destined not to be the first French postwar design to fly, an honour which instead fell to the Sud-Est Languedoc, a civil version of the Bloch MB161. The prototype Br.761, F-WASK, first flew at Villacoublay on 15 February 1949.

The 761 featured a cantilever wing set at mid-height on the bulky fuselage. The retractable tricycle landing gear featured dual-wheel main units. The empennage had twin fins and rudders and a vestigial central fin. The prototype was powered by four 1,580 hp (1,180 kW) SNECMA 14R-24 radial engines. The Breguets serving with Air France had up to 107 seats and an elevator between the two floors.

The prototype was followed by three Br.761S pre-production aircraft powered by 2,020 hp (1506 kW) Pratt & Whitney R-2800-B31 radial engines. These were fitted with 12 ft 1½in (3.70 m) diameter Hamilton Standard propellers. The aircraft successfully completed their trials incident-free. Their first flights were in 1951 and 1952.

The French Government ordered 12 production aircraft, the Breguet 76-3, which was later redesignated Br.763. Six aircraft were to be operated by Air France and the other six by the Ministry of Transport. The 763 had more powerful engines, a 1.20 metres (3 ft 11 in) larger wingspan, strengthened wings and a three-crew flight deck (earlier aircraft had four crew). The 763 first flew on 20 July 1951 and entered service with Air France during autumn 1952.

The Air France aircraft had accommodation for 59 passengers on the top deck, and 48 on the lower deck, although the aircraft was capable of carrying 135 passengers in a high-density layout. During 1964 Air France transferred six Br.763s to the French Air Force. The air force also acquired the three pre-production Br.761S aircraft and four new Br.765 Sahara freighter aircraft with removable cargo doors.

Projects to build versions powered with British engines (for possible United Kingdom buyers) did not come to fruition. The projects would have been the 766 (with the Bristol Hercules radial engine), and the 767 with British turboprop engines.

== Operational history ==
=== Civil ===
The prototype Br.761 entered service with Air Algérie in 1952 as a cargo aircraft. It was withdrawn early the next year. Silver City Airways leased a Br.761 for three months in the summer of 1953 for use on the Hamburg - Berlin route. A total of 127 round trips carried 4,000,000 pounds (1,800 t) of freight with up to three round trips being made in a day, each leg taking 52 minutes flight time. It was rumoured that Silver City would purchase three aircraft at £770,000 but this did not materialise into a sale.

The Breguet Br.763 Provence entered service with Air France on 10 March 1953. The inaugural route was Lyon - Algiers. The type was used on European routes from Paris, mainly to the Mediterranean area, but occasionally to London. Domestic routes included Paris to Lyon, Marseille and Nice.

Six aircraft were used in response to a serious incident at an oil exploration site in the desert of Algeria, where French oil rig engineers were in need of assistance. A total of 60 tonnes of heavy equipment and 200 personnel were moved to and from Algiers in four days.

The introduction of the Sud Aviation Caravelle rendered the Provence obsolete as a passenger aircraft. The Caravelle was faster, more comfortable and had a greater range. In 1958, Breguet borrowed F-BASQ from Air France for a sales tour to North and South America. This was the aircraft which had force-landed at Pont-Évêque in 1955. The tour covered 25,000 miles (40,000 km), and took in the cities of New York, Washington, D.C. and Miami in the United States, Bogotá in Colombia, Santiago in Chile, Rio de Janeiro and Brasília in Brazil. The tour failed to generate any orders. In North America, the jet age had begun, while the aircraft had too great a capacity for operators in South America, despite being cheaper on a cost-per-seat to operate than a Douglas DC-4. The Provence was used on fewer and fewer passenger services, being replaced by the Caravelle and Vickers Viscount. Six aircraft were transferred to the Armée de l'Air. Air France converted the six remaining Br.763s into freighters with the name Universel. These remained in service on European freight services until the early 1970s. The final flight was on 31 March 1971 from Heathrow to Paris-Orly. A double-deck AEC Routemaster bus was parked alongside the aircraft to mark the retirement of the Br.763 from service.

=== Military ===
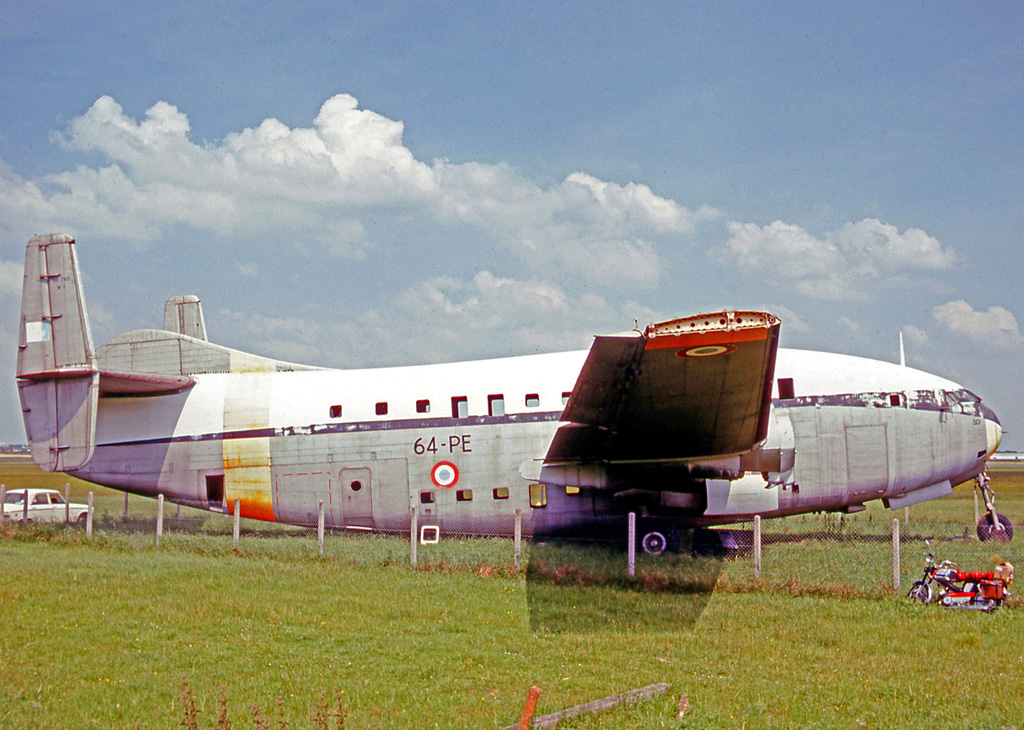
Breguet BR.765 of the French Air Force

In October 1955 an order for 30 Breguet Br.765 Sahara aircraft for the Armée de l'Air was announced. This order was cancelled by the end of the year, but construction on four aircraft was so far advanced that they were completed. These entered service with 64 Escadre de Transport.

The French Air Force acquired the three pre-production Br.761S aircraft. These and the six Sahara aircraft acquired from Air France provided the French Air Force with a valuable transport fleet for moving personnel and materials to the Pacific nuclear testing areas. The Sahara fleet was retired in 1972.

== Accidents and incidents ==
The Breguet Deux-Ponts had an excellent safety record.

- On 10 May 1955, F-BASQ of Air France made a forced landing in a field at Pont-Évêque, Isère following directional control problems in flight. The four crew and 46 passengers were unharmed. The aircraft was repaired on site and flown out from an improvised airstrip a few weeks later.

== Variants ==
Breguet 761
Prototype with four 1,190 kW (1,590 hp) SNECMA 14R-24 radial engines, one built.

Breguet 761S
Pre-production aircraft, powered by four 1,600 kW (2,100 hp) Pratt & Whitney R-2800-B31 engines; three built.

Breguet 763 Provence
Production aircraft for Air France, powered by four 1,800 kW (2,400 hp) Pratt & Whitney R-2800-CA18 engines; 12 built.

Breguet 764
Proposed anti-submarine naval version, prototype 761 was to be converted but project was abandoned.

Breguet 765 Sahara
Freighter version for the French Air Force, powered by four 1,900 kW (2,500 hp) Pratt & Whitney R-2800-CB17 engines; four built.

== Operators ==
France
Air Algérie (loaned for trials in 1952 when Algeria was still a French territory)
French Air Force
Air France
French Navy

United Kingdom
Silver City (leased 1953)

== Surviving aircraft ==
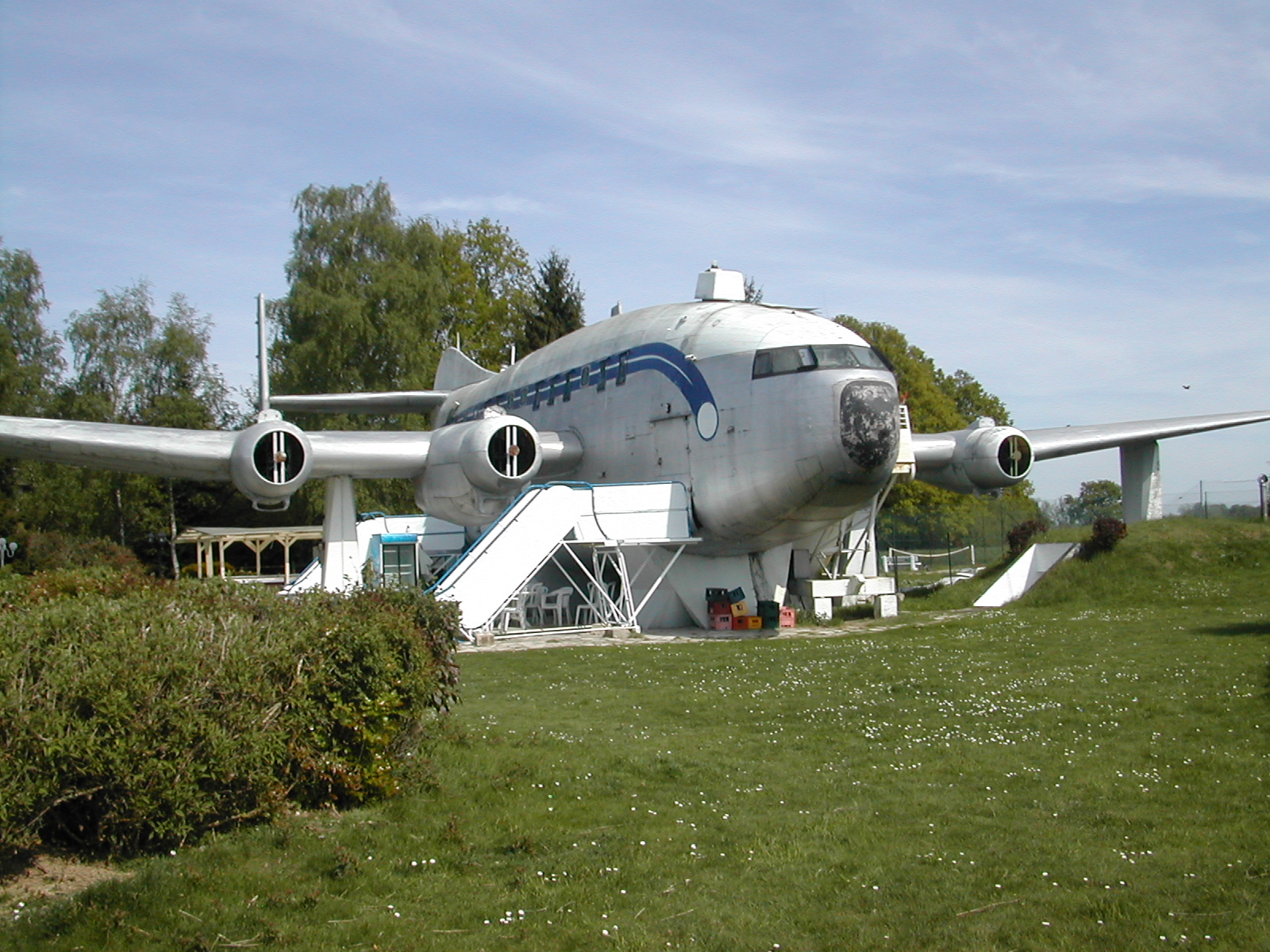
F-BASS, converted to restaurant, Fontenay-Trésigny Airport

- Br.763 c/n 6, F-BASS of Air France (later saw service as F-BACC with the French Air Force) was acquired in 1968 by the Aéroclub de Chaubuisson, which has converted it into a restaurant at the single-runway aerodrome it operates in Fontenay-Trésigny, France
- Br.765 c/n 501, 64-PE of the French Air Force is preserved as a gate guard at Évreux-Fauville Air Base, France
- Br.765 c/n 504, 64-PH of the French Air Force (nicknamed Brigitte while in service) was transported to Ailes Anciennes Toulouse, France, in stages from 1985 to 1987, where restoration efforts were still ongoing as of 2023, when a former airman of the French Air Force was able to provide two original mechanical pieces from Brigitte.

== Specifications (Br.763) ==
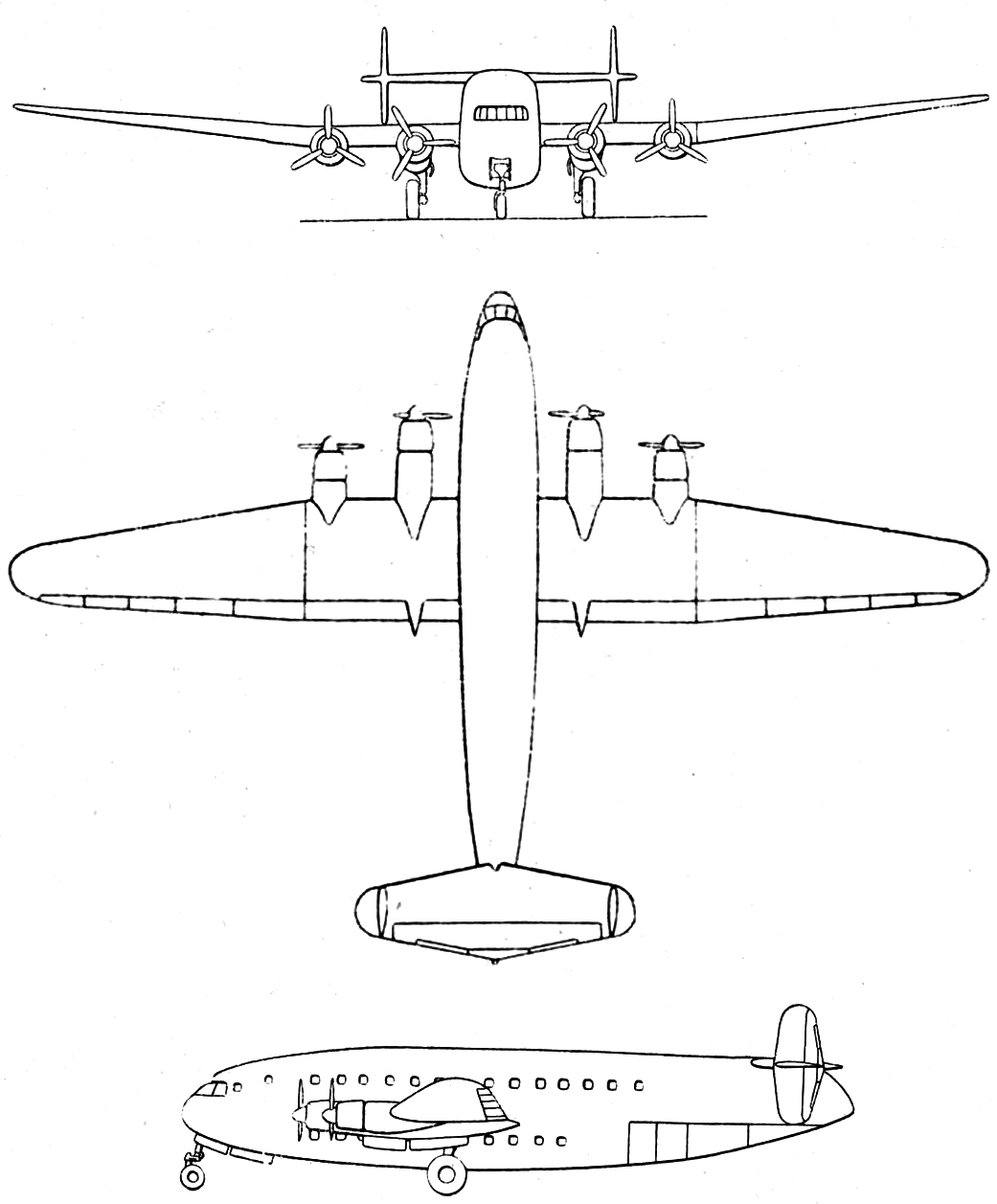
3-view line drawing, without the vestigial central fin included on the prototype and some production models

Data from Jane's All The World's Aircraft 1953–54

General characteristics

- Crew: 3
- Capacity: 107 passengers
- Length: 28.94 m (94 ft 11 in)
- Wingspan: 42.96 m (140 ft 11 in)
- Height: 9.56 m (31 ft 4 in)
- Wing area: 185.4 m^{2} (1,996 sq ft)
- Aspect ratio: 9.95:1
- Empty weight: 32,535 kg (71,727 lb)
- Max takeoff weight: 50,000 kg (110,231 lb)
- Fuel capacity: 15,300 L (4,042 US gal; 3,366 imp gal)
- Powerplant: 4 × Pratt & Whitney R-2800-CA18 eighteen-cylinder radial engines, 1,800 kW (2,400 hp) each
- Propellers: 3-bladed Hamilton-Standard, 4.25 m (13 ft 11 in) diameter constant-speed propellers

Performance

- Cruise speed: 390 km/h (240 mph, 210 kn) at 3,000 m (10,000 ft) (max cruise)

336 km/h (209 mph; 181 kn) at 3,000 m (9,800 ft) (econ. cruise)

- Range: 2,290 km (1,420 mi, 1,240 nmi)
- Rate of climb: 5.8 m/s (1,140 ft/min) at sea level
- Time to altitude: 3,000 m (9,800 ft) in 13 minutes
- Take-off distance to 15 m (49 ft): 1,260 m (4,134 ft)
- Landing distance from 15 m (49 ft): 980 m (3,215 ft)

== See also ==
Aircraft of comparable role, configuration, and era

- C-97 Stratofreighter
