= Pont-l'Évêque =

Pont-l'Évêque may refer to:

== Places in France ==
- Pont-l'Évêque, Calvados, in the Calvados department, Normandy
  - Canton of Pont-l'Évêque, the surrounding canton
- Pont-l'Évêque, Oise, in the Oise department, Picardy

== Other uses ==
- Pont-l'Évêque cheese, named after the commune in Normandy
- Pont l'Eveque (horse), winner of the 1940 English Derby
- Roger de Pont L'Évêque, 12th-century Archbishop of York

== See also ==
- Pont-Évêque, Isère, France
