= Tupin-et-Semons =

- Commune
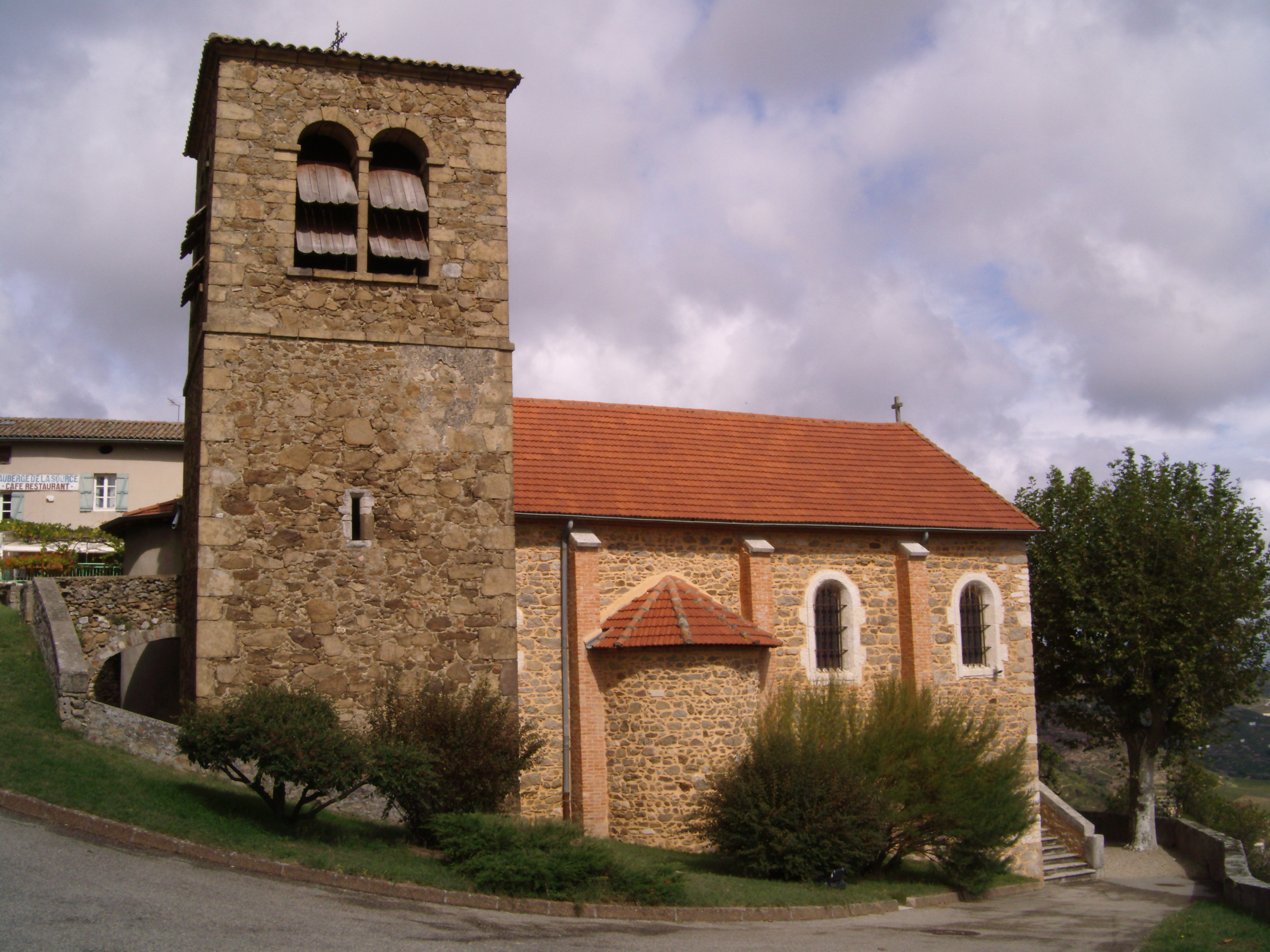
- The church of Semons
- Location of Tupin-et-Semons
- Location within France Location within Auvergne-Rhône-Alpes
- Coordinates: 45°28′45″N 4°46′37″E
- Country: France
- Region: Auvergne-Rhône-Alpes
- Department: Rhône
- Arrondissement: Lyon
- Canton: Mornant
- Intercommunality: CA Vienne Condrieu

Government
  - Mayor (2020–2026): Martin Daubrée
- Area^{1}: 8.26 km^{2} (3.19 sq mi)
- Elevation: 450 m (1,480 ft)
- Highest elevation: 426 m (1,398 ft)
- Lowest elevation: 144 m (472 ft)
- Population (2023): 653
  - Density: 79.1/km^{2} (205/sq mi)
- Time zone: UTC+01:00 (CET)
  - Summer (DST): UTC+02:00 (CEST)
- INSEE/Postal code: 69253 /69420
- ^{1} French Land Register data, which excludes lakes, ponds, glaciers > 1 km^{2} (0.386 sq mi or 247 acres) and river estuaries.

Tupin-et-Semons is a commune in the Rhône department in eastern France.

== See also ==
- Communes of the Rhône department
