= Villette-de-Vienne =

- Commune
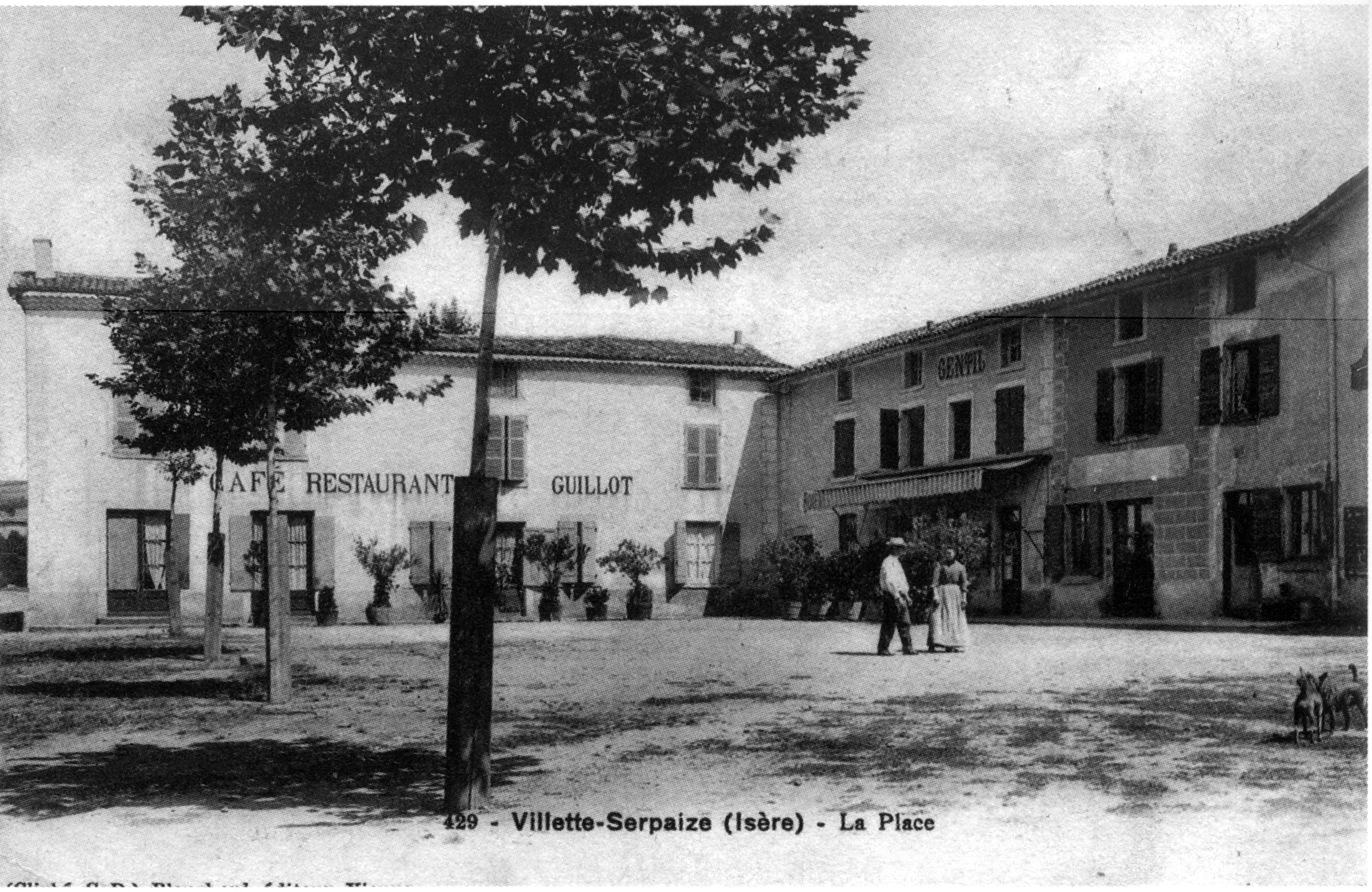
- Villette-de-Vienne in 1907

- Coat of arms
- Location of Villette-de-Vienne
- Location within France Location within Auvergne-Rhône-Alpes
- Coordinates: 45°35′22″N 4°54′54″E
- Country: France
- Region: Auvergne-Rhône-Alpes
- Department: Isère
- Arrondissement: Vienne
- Canton: Vienne-1
- Intercommunality: CA Vienne Condrieu

Government
  - Mayor (2024–2026): Cristelle Veillard
- Area^{1}: 11.03 km^{2} (4.26 sq mi)
- Elevation: 186 m (610 ft)
- Highest elevation: 364 m (1,194 ft)
- Lowest elevation: 196 m (643 ft)
- Population (2023): 2,025
  - Density: 183.6/km^{2} (475.5/sq mi)
- Time zone: UTC+01:00 (CET)
  - Summer (DST): UTC+02:00 (CEST)
- INSEE/Postal code: 38558 /38200
- ^{1} French Land Register data, which excludes lakes, ponds, glaciers > 1 km^{2} (0.386 sq mi or 247 acres) and river estuaries.

Villette-de-Vienne (French pronunciation: [vilɛt də vjɛn], literally Villette of Vienne) is a commune in the Isère department in southeastern France.

== Population ==
Historical population
Year	Pop.	±% p.a.
1968	445	—
1975	614	+4.71%
1982	948	+6.40%
1990	1,087	+1.72%
1999	1,173	+0.85%
2007	1,464	+2.81%
2012	1,682	+2.82%
2017	1,872	+2.16%
2023	2,025	+1.32%
Source: INSEE

== See also ==
- Communes of the Isère department
