= Seyssuel =

- Commune
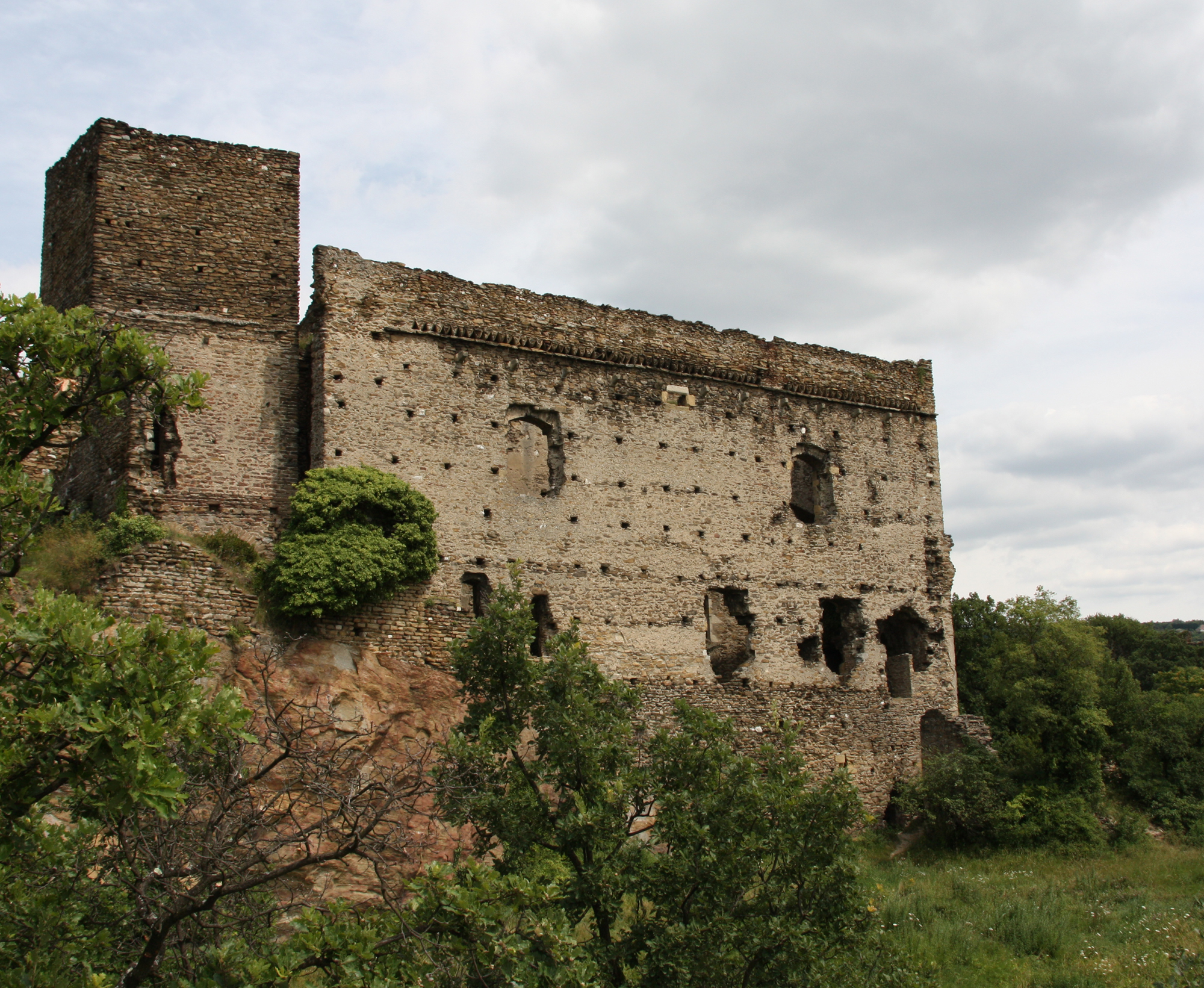
- Chateau of the arch-bishop
- Location of Seyssuel
- Location within France Location within Auvergne-Rhône-Alpes
- Coordinates: 45°33′39″N 4°50′46″E
- Country: France
- Region: Auvergne-Rhône-Alpes
- Department: Isère
- Arrondissement: Vienne
- Canton: Vienne-1
- Intercommunality: CA Vienne Condrieu

Government
  - Mayor (2020–2026): Frédéric Belmonte
- Area^{1}: 9.75 km^{2} (3.76 sq mi)
- Elevation: 325 m (1,066 ft)
- Highest elevation: 357 m (1,171 ft)
- Lowest elevation: 141 m (463 ft)
- Population (2023): 2,248
  - Density: 231/km^{2} (597/sq mi)
- Demonym(s): seyssuellois, seyssuelloises
- Time zone: UTC+01:00 (CET)
  - Summer (DST): UTC+02:00 (CEST)
- INSEE/Postal code: 38487 /38200
- ^{1} French Land Register data, which excludes lakes, ponds, glaciers > 1 km^{2} (0.386 sq mi or 247 acres) and river estuaries.

Seyssuel (French pronunciation: [sɛsɥɛl]) is a commune in the Isère department in southeastern France.

== Population ==
Historical population

Year	Pop.	±% p.a.
1793	1,086	—
1821	1,148	+0.20%
1846	1,504	+1.09%
1872	609	−3.42%
1901	516	−0.57%
1926	700	+1.23%
1946	750	+0.35%
1962	747	−0.03%
1968	801	+1.17%

Year	Pop.	±% p.a.
1975	1,194	+5.87%
1982	1,345	+1.72%
1990	1,696	+2.94%
1999	1,889	+1.20%
2007	1,959	+0.46%
2012	2,013	+0.55%
2017	2,003	−0.10%
2023	2,248	+1.94%

Source: EHESS and INSEE (1968-2023)

== See also ==
- Communes of the Isère department
