= Chasse-sur-Rhône =

Commune in Isère, France

- Commune
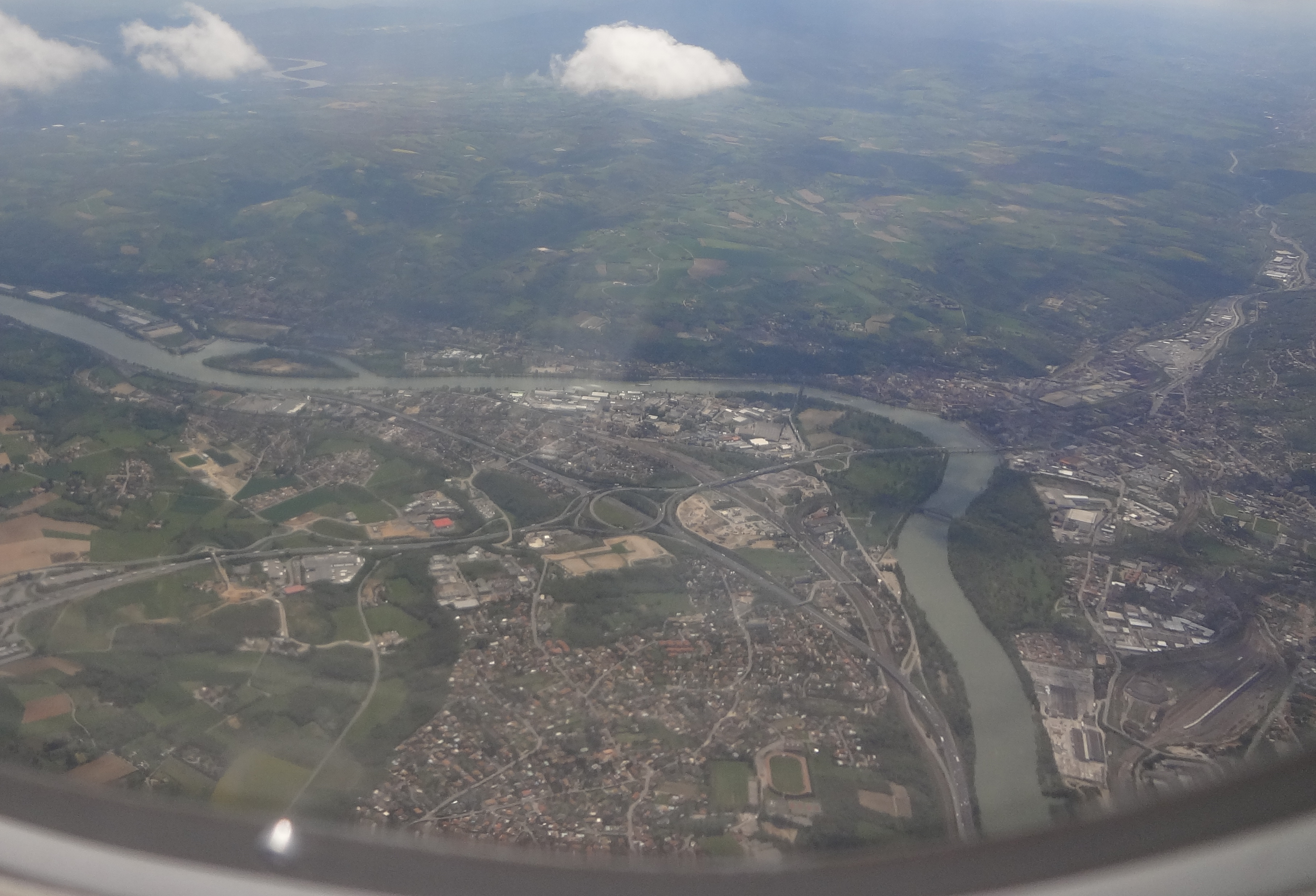
- An aerial view of Chasse-sur-Rhône

- Coat of arms
- Location of Chasse-sur-Rhône
- Location within France Location within Auvergne-Rhône-Alpes
- Coordinates: 45°34′53″N 4°48′03″E
- Country: France
- Region: Auvergne-Rhône-Alpes
- Department: Isère
- Arrondissement: Vienne
- Canton: Vienne-1
- Intercommunality: CA Vienne Condrieu

Government
  - Mayor (2020–2026): Christophe Bouvier
- Area^{1}: 7.91 km^{2} (3.05 sq mi)
- Highest elevation: 290 m (950 ft)
- Lowest elevation: 145 m (476 ft)
- Population (2023): 6,588
  - Density: 833/km^{2} (2,160/sq mi)
- Time zone: UTC+01:00 (CET)
  - Summer (DST): UTC+02:00 (CEST)
- INSEE/Postal code: 38087 /38670
- ^{1} French Land Register data, which excludes lakes, ponds, glaciers > 1 km^{2} (0.386 sq mi or 247 acres) and river estuaries.

Chasse-sur-Rhône (French pronunciation: [ʃas syʁ ʁon], literally Chasse on Rhône) is a commune in the Isère department in southeastern France.

The St. Joan of Arc Chapel, where Joan of Arc reputedly visited and prayed at the chapel on 9 March 1429 after meeting King Charles VII of France was originally built in Chasse-sur-Rhône, before being dismantled and transported to the United States, where it was rebuilt, in 1927.

== Population ==
Historical population

Year	Pop.	±% p.a.
1856	954	—
1861	1,002	+0.99%
1866	1,034	+0.63%
1872	1,162	+1.96%
1876	1,105	−1.25%
1881	1,160	+0.98%
1886	1,242	+1.38%
1891	1,077	−2.81%
1896	1,118	+0.75%
1901	1,230	+1.93%
1906	1,194	−0.59%
1911	1,516	+4.89%
1921	2,035	+2.99%
1926	2,469	+3.94%

Year	Pop.	±% p.a.
1931	2,559	+0.72%
1936	2,325	−1.90%
1946	2,420	+0.40%
1954	2,804	+1.86%
1962	3,630	+3.28%
1968	3,529	−0.47%
1975	3,944	+1.60%
1982	4,378	+1.50%
1990	4,566	+0.53%
1999	4,795	+0.55%
2007	5,003	+0.53%
2012	5,500	+1.91%
2017	6,048	+1.92%
2023	6,588	+1.44%

Source: EHESS and INSEE (1968–2023)

== Twin towns ==
Chasse-sur-Rhône is twinned with:

- Nor Hachen, Armenia, since 1998
- Campobello di Licata, Italy, since 2003

== See also ==
- Communes of the Isère department
