= Chaussan =

- Commune
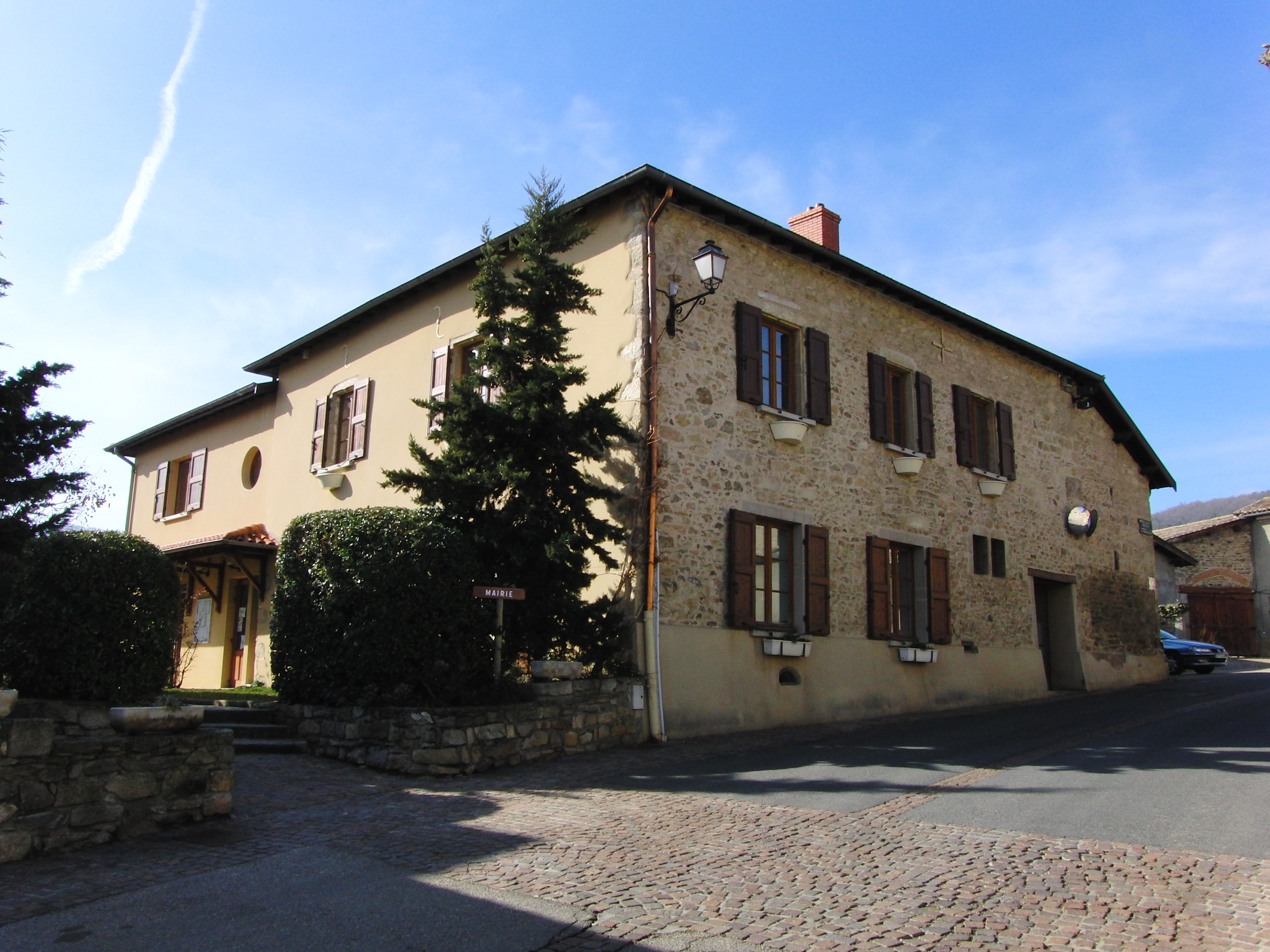
- The town hall in Chaussan

- Coat of arms
- Location of Chaussan
- Location within France Location within Auvergne-Rhône-Alpes
- Coordinates: 45°38′04″N 4°38′23″E
- Country: France
- Region: Auvergne-Rhône-Alpes
- Department: Rhône
- Arrondissement: Lyon
- Canton: Mornant

Government
  - Mayor (2020–2026): Luc Chavassieux
- Area^{1}: 7.89 km^{2} (3.05 sq mi)
- Elevation: 540 m (1,770 ft)
- Highest elevation: 753 m (2,470 ft)
- Lowest elevation: 378 m (1,240 ft)
- Population (2023): 1,218
  - Density: 154/km^{2} (400/sq mi)
- Time zone: UTC+01:00 (CET)
  - Summer (DST): UTC+02:00 (CEST)
- INSEE/Postal code: 69051 /69440
- ^{1} French Land Register data, which excludes lakes, ponds, glaciers > 1 km^{2} (0.386 sq mi or 247 acres) and river estuaries.

Chaussan (French pronunciation: [ʃosɑ̃]) is a commune in the Rhône department in eastern France.

== See also ==
Communes of the Rhône department
