= Luzinay =

- Commune
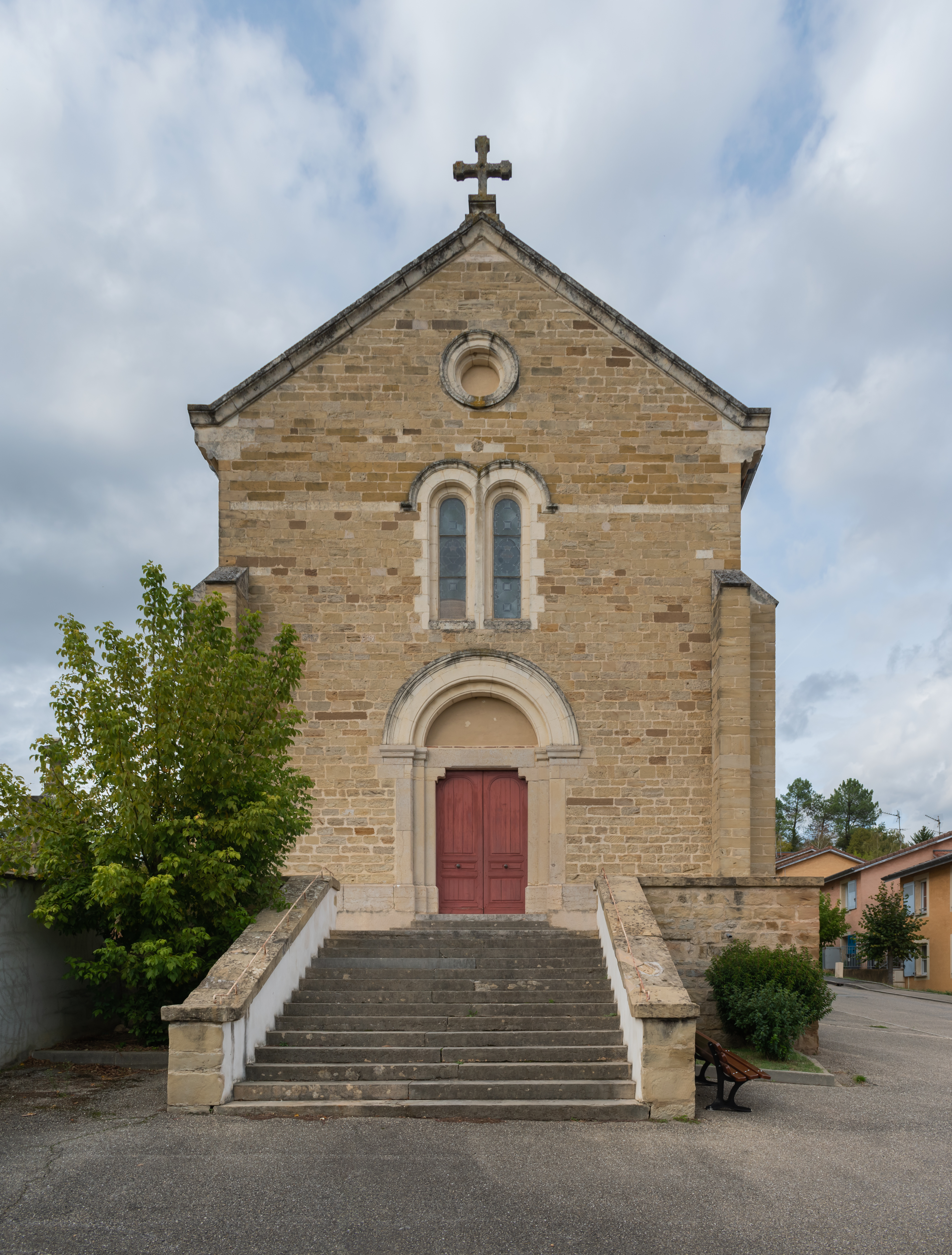
- The church in 2020
- Location of Luzinay
- Location within France Location within Auvergne-Rhône-Alpes
- Coordinates: 45°35′23″N 4°57′17″E
- Country: France
- Region: Auvergne-Rhône-Alpes
- Department: Isère
- Arrondissement: Vienne
- Canton: Vienne-1
- Intercommunality: CA Vienne Condrieu

Government
  - Mayor (2020–2026): Christophe Charles
- Area^{1}: 18.96 km^{2} (7.32 sq mi)
- Elevation: 223 m (732 ft)
- Highest elevation: 366 m (1,201 ft)
- Lowest elevation: 207 m (679 ft)
- Population (2023): 2,416
  - Density: 127.4/km^{2} (330.0/sq mi)
- Time zone: UTC+01:00 (CET)
  - Summer (DST): UTC+02:00 (CEST)
- INSEE/Postal code: 38215 /38200
- ^{1} French Land Register data, which excludes lakes, ponds, glaciers > 1 km^{2} (0.386 sq mi or 247 acres) and river estuaries.

Luzinay (French pronunciation: [lyzinɛ]) is a commune in the Isère department in southeastern France.

== Population ==
Historical population

Year	Pop.	±% p.a.
1793	697	—
1800	721	+0.48%
1806	740	+0.43%
1821	794	+0.47%
1831	981	+2.14%
1836	1,042	+1.21%
1841	1,073	+0.59%
1846	1,027	−0.87%
1851	1,032	+0.10%
1856	1,037	+0.10%
1861	1,045	+0.15%
1866	1,039	−0.12%
1872	974	−1.07%
1876	904	−1.85%
1881	911	+0.15%
1886	910	−0.02%
1891	888	−0.49%
1896	893	+0.11%
1901	830	−1.45%

Year	Pop.	±% p.a.
1906	812	−0.44%
1911	808	−0.10%
1921	717	−1.19%
1926	696	−0.59%
1931	648	−1.42%
1936	642	−0.19%
1946	616	−0.41%
1954	623	+0.14%
1962	598	−0.51%
1968	683	+2.24%
1975	898	+3.99%
1982	1,225	+4.54%
1990	1,568	+3.13%
1999	1,973	+2.59%
2007	2,194	+1.34%
2012	2,157	−0.34%
2017	2,302	+1.31%
2023	2,416	+0.81%

Source: EHESS and INSEE (1968–2023)

== See also ==
- Communes of the Isère department
