= Canton of Mornant =

Coordinates: 45.6278°N 4.6469°E

Mornant
- Canton
- Country: France
- Region: Auvergne-Rhône-Alpes
- Department: Rhône
- No. of communes: {{{nbcomm}}}
- Area: 242.45 km^{2} (93.61 sq mi)
- Population (2023): 43,562
  - Density: 179.67/km^{2} (465.35/sq mi)
- INSEE code: 6908

The Canton of Mornant is a French administrative division, located in the Rhône department.

The canton was established by decree of 27 February 2014 which came into force in March 2015.

== Composition ==
The canton of Mornant is composed of 19 communes:

Communes	Population (2012)
Ampuis	2,680
Beauvallon	3,757
Chabanière	4,042
Chaussan	972
Condrieu	3,856
Échalas	1,597
Les Haies	792
Loire-sur-Rhône	2,473
Longes	909
Mornant	5,545
Riverie	298
Saint-Cyr-sur-le-Rhône	1,244
Sainte-Colombe	1,878
Saint-Laurent-d'Agny	2,109
Saint-Romain-en-Gal	1,704
Saint-Romain-en-Gier	520
Soucieu-en-Jarrest	4,055
Trèves	712
Tupin-et-Semons	615

== See also ==
- Cantons of the Rhône department
- Communes of the Rhône department
