= Saint-Laurent-d'Agny =

- Commune
- Coat of arms
- Location of Saint-Laurent-d'Agny
- Location within France Location within Auvergne-Rhône-Alpes
- Coordinates: 45°38′32″N 4°41′11″E
- Country: France
- Region: Auvergne-Rhône-Alpes
- Department: Rhône
- Arrondissement: Lyon
- Canton: Mornant
- Intercommunality: Pays Mornantais

Government
  - Mayor (2020–2026): Fabien Breuzin
- Area^{1}: 10.55 km^{2} (4.07 sq mi)
- Elevation: 400 m (1,300 ft)
- Highest elevation: 537 m (1,762 ft)
- Lowest elevation: 317 m (1,040 ft)
- Population (2023): 2,111
  - Density: 200.1/km^{2} (518.2/sq mi)
- Time zone: UTC+01:00 (CET)
  - Summer (DST): UTC+02:00 (CEST)
- INSEE/Postal code: 69219 /69440
- ^{1} French Land Register data, which excludes lakes, ponds, glaciers > 1 km^{2} (0.386 sq mi or 247 acres) and river estuaries.

Saint-Laurent-d'Agny (French pronunciation: [sɛ̃ loʁɑ̃ daɲi]) is a commune in the Rhône department of eastern France, southwest of Lyon.

== Population ==
Historical population
Year	Pop.	±% p.a.
1968	685	—
1975	909	+4.12%
1982	1,165	+3.61%
1990	1,439	+2.68%
1999	1,768	+2.31%
2007	1,991	+1.50%
2012	2,109	+1.16%
2017	2,139	+0.28%
2023	2,111	−0.22%
Source: INSEE

== See also ==
- Communes of the Rhône department
