= Soucieu-en-Jarrest =

Soucieu-en-Jarrest Soci (Arpitan)
- Commune
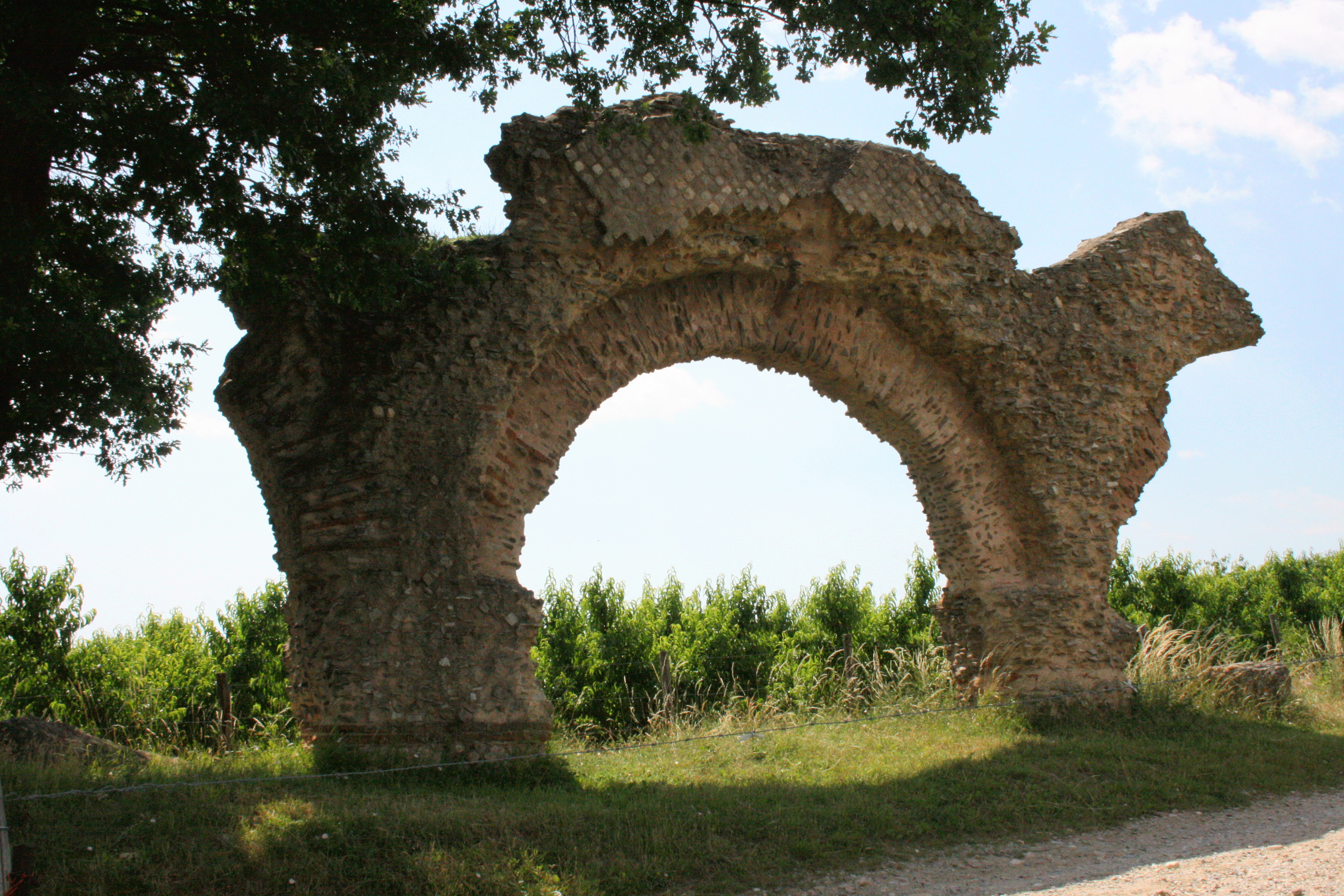
- The "Camel" Roman remains of the Aqueduct of the Gier, a symbol of Soucieu-en-Jarrest

- Coat of arms
- Location of Soucieu-en-Jarrest
- Location within France Location within Auvergne-Rhône-Alpes
- Coordinates: 45°40′43″N 4°42′16″E
- Country: France
- Region: Auvergne-Rhône-Alpes
- Department: Rhône
- Arrondissement: Lyon
- Canton: Mornant
- Intercommunality: Pays Mornantais

Government
  - Mayor (2020–2026): Arnaud Savoie
- Area^{1}: 14.2 km^{2} (5.5 sq mi)
- Elevation: 400 m (1,300 ft)
- Highest elevation: 540 m (1,770 ft)
- Lowest elevation: 224 m (735 ft)
- Population (2023): 4,660
  - Density: 328/km^{2} (850/sq mi)
- Time zone: UTC+01:00 (CET)
  - Summer (DST): UTC+02:00 (CEST)
- INSEE/Postal code: 69176 /69510
- ^{1} French Land Register data, which excludes lakes, ponds, glaciers > 1 km^{2} (0.386 sq mi or 247 acres) and river estuaries.

Soucieu-en-Jarrest (French pronunciation: [susjø ɑ̃ ʒaʁɛ]; Arpitan: Soci [sɔ.ˈsi]) is a commune in the Rhône department in eastern France.

== Population ==
Historical population
Year	Pop.	±% p.a.
1968	1,686	—
1975	1,933	+1.97%
1982	2,286	+2.43%
1990	2,654	+1.88%
1999	3,214	+2.15%
2007	3,594	+1.41%
2012	4,055	+2.44%
2017	4,515	+2.17%
2023	4,660	+0.53%
Source: INSEE

== See also ==
- Communes of the Rhône department
