= Longes =

- Commune
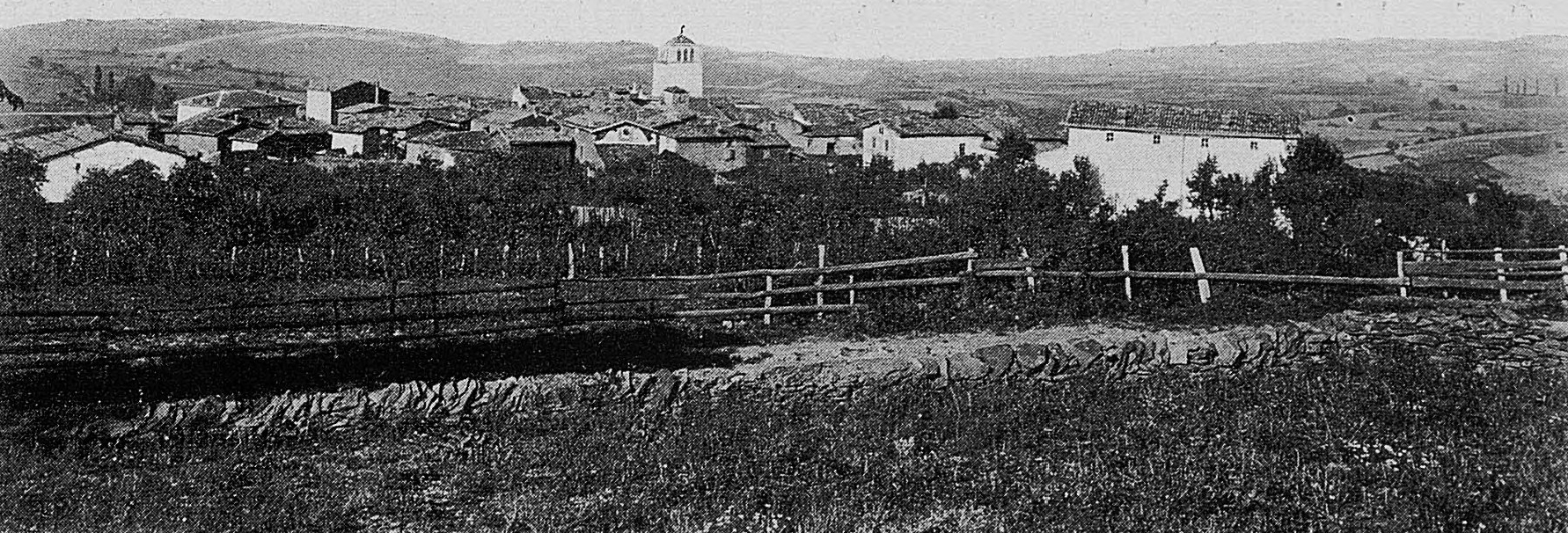
- A general view of Longes, at the beginning of the 20th century
- Location of Longes
- Location within France Location within Auvergne-Rhône-Alpes
- Coordinates: 45°30′20″N 4°41′21″E
- Country: France
- Region: Auvergne-Rhône-Alpes
- Department: Rhône
- Arrondissement: Lyon
- Canton: Mornant
- Intercommunality: CA Vienne Condrieu

Government
  - Mayor (2020–2026): Lucien Bruyas
- Area^{1}: 24.06 km^{2} (9.29 sq mi)
- Elevation: 420 m (1,380 ft)
- Highest elevation: 785 m (2,575 ft)
- Lowest elevation: 210 m (690 ft)
- Population (2023): 938
  - Density: 39.0/km^{2} (101/sq mi)
- Time zone: UTC+01:00 (CET)
  - Summer (DST): UTC+02:00 (CEST)
- INSEE/Postal code: 69119 /69420
- ^{1} French Land Register data, which excludes lakes, ponds, glaciers > 1 km^{2} (0.386 sq mi or 247 acres) and river estuaries.

Longes (French pronunciation: [lɔ̃ʒ]) is a commune in the Rhône department in eastern France.

== See also ==
- Communes of the Rhône department
