= Trèves, Rhône =

Trèves
- Commune
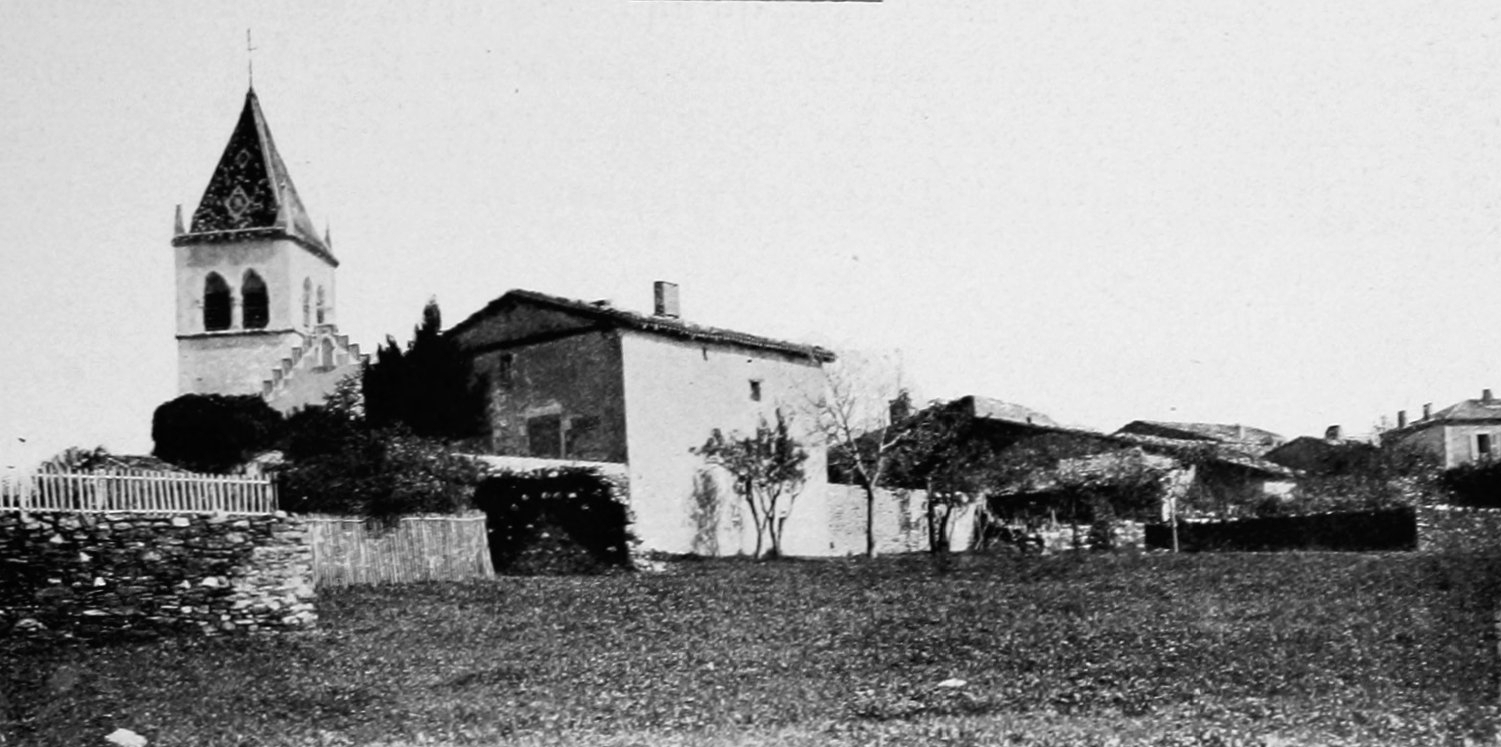
- Trèves, in the early 20th century
- Location of Trèves
- Location within France Location within Auvergne-Rhône-Alpes
- Coordinates: 45°32′25″N 4°40′37″E
- Country: France
- Region: Auvergne-Rhône-Alpes
- Department: Rhône
- Arrondissement: Lyon
- Canton: Mornant
- Intercommunality: CA Vienne Condrieu

Government
  - Mayor (2020–2026): Annick Guichard
- Area^{1}: 7.56 km^{2} (2.92 sq mi)
- Elevation: 311 m (1,020 ft)
- Highest elevation: 405 m (1,329 ft)
- Lowest elevation: 190 m (620 ft)
- Population (2023): 712
  - Density: 94.2/km^{2} (244/sq mi)
- Time zone: UTC+01:00 (CET)
  - Summer (DST): UTC+02:00 (CEST)
- INSEE/Postal code: 69252 /69420
- ^{1} French Land Register data, which excludes lakes, ponds, glaciers > 1 km^{2} (0.386 sq mi or 247 acres) and river estuaries.

Trèves (French pronunciation: [tʁɛv]) is a commune in the Rhône department in eastern France.

== See also ==
- Communes of the Rhône department
