= Saint-Cyr-sur-le-Rhône =

- Commune
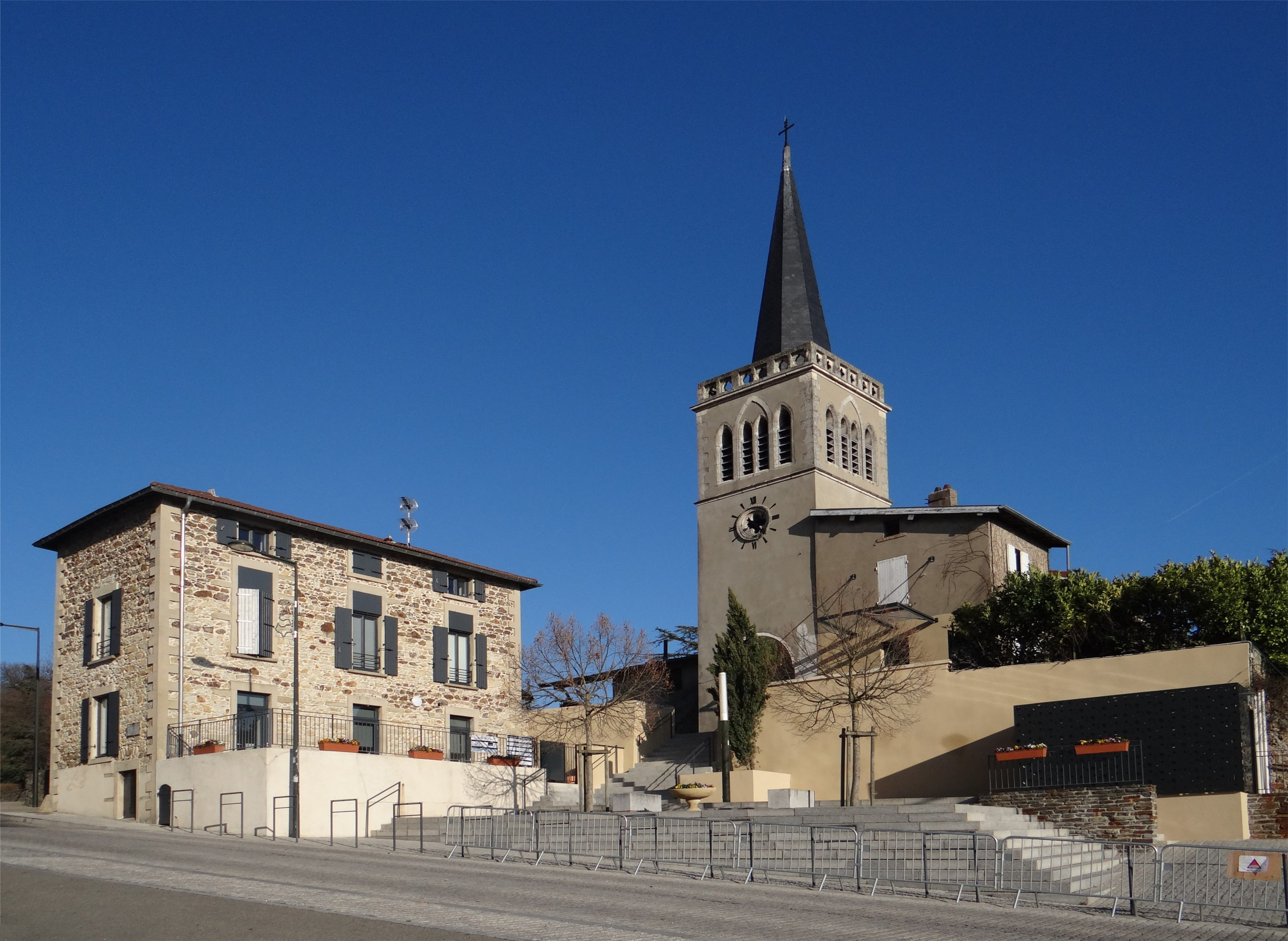
- Church of Saint-Cyr
- Location of Saint-Cyr-sur-le-Rhône
- Location within France Location within Auvergne-Rhône-Alpes
- Coordinates: 45°31′00″N 4°51′11″E
- Country: France
- Region: Auvergne-Rhône-Alpes
- Department: Rhône
- Arrondissement: Lyon
- Canton: Mornant
- Intercommunality: CA Vienne Condrieu

Government
  - Mayor (2020–2026): Claudine Perrot-Berton
- Area^{1}: 6.02 km^{2} (2.32 sq mi)
- Elevation: 250 m (820 ft)
- Highest elevation: 528 m (1,732 ft)
- Lowest elevation: 152 m (499 ft)
- Population (2023): 1,286
  - Density: 214/km^{2} (553/sq mi)
- Time zone: UTC+01:00 (CET)
  - Summer (DST): UTC+02:00 (CEST)
- INSEE/Postal code: 69193 /69560
- ^{1} French Land Register data, which excludes lakes, ponds, glaciers > 1 km^{2} (0.386 sq mi or 247 acres) and river estuaries.

Saint-Cyr-sur-le-Rhône (French pronunciation: [sɛ̃ siʁ syʁ lə ʁon], literally Saint-Cyr on the Rhône) is a commune in the Rhône department in eastern France.

== See also ==
- Communes of the Rhône department
