= Les Haies =

- Commune
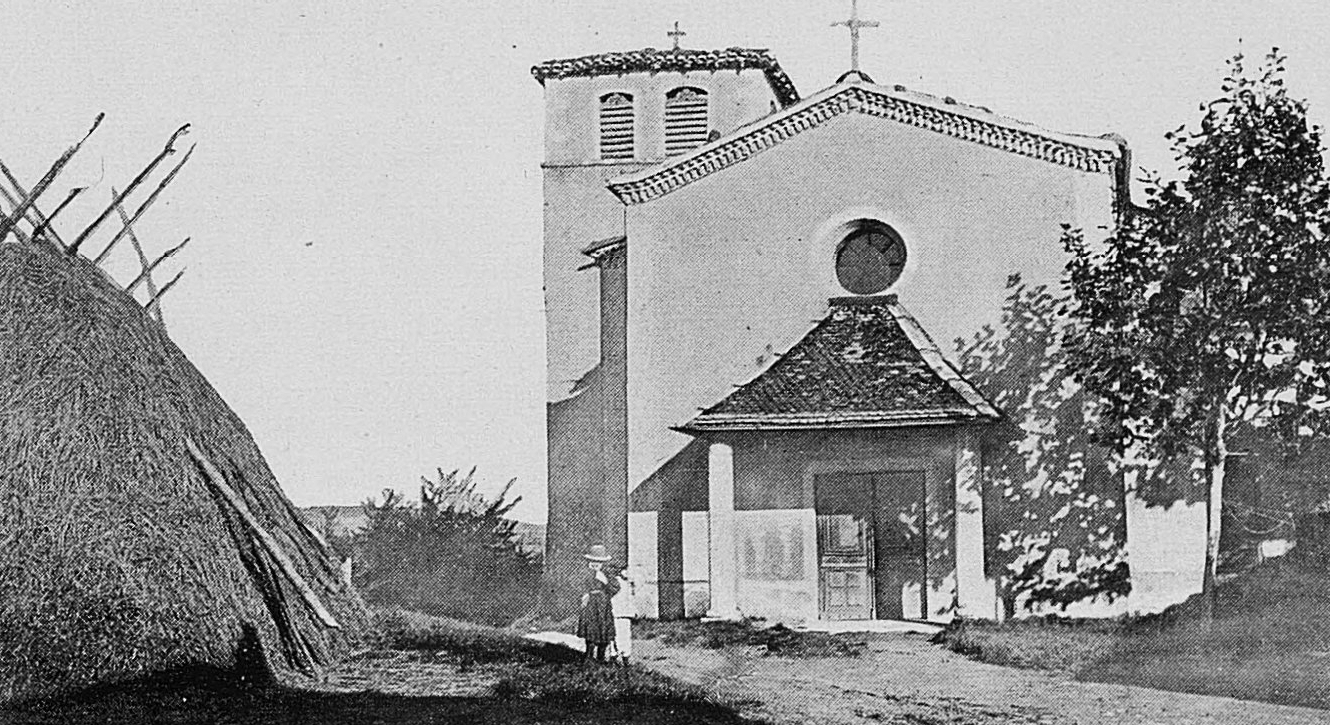
- The church in Les Haies, at the beginning of the 20th century
- Location of Les Haies
- Location within France Location within Auvergne-Rhône-Alpes
- Coordinates: 45°30′18″N 4°44′54″E
- Country: France
- Region: Auvergne-Rhône-Alpes
- Department: Rhône
- Arrondissement: Lyon
- Canton: Mornant
- Intercommunality: CA Vienne Condrieu
- Area^{1}: 15.97 km^{2} (6.17 sq mi)
- Elevation: 380 m (1,250 ft)
- Highest elevation: 564 m (1,850 ft)
- Lowest elevation: 307 m (1,007 ft)
- Population (2023): 723
  - Density: 45.3/km^{2} (117/sq mi)
- Time zone: UTC+01:00 (CET)
  - Summer (DST): UTC+02:00 (CEST)
- INSEE/Postal code: 69097 /69420
- ^{1} French Land Register data, which excludes lakes, ponds, glaciers > 1 km^{2} (0.386 sq mi or 247 acres) and river estuaries.

Les Haies is a commune in the Rhône department in eastern France.

== See also ==
- Communes of the Rhône department
