= Chuzelles =

- Commune
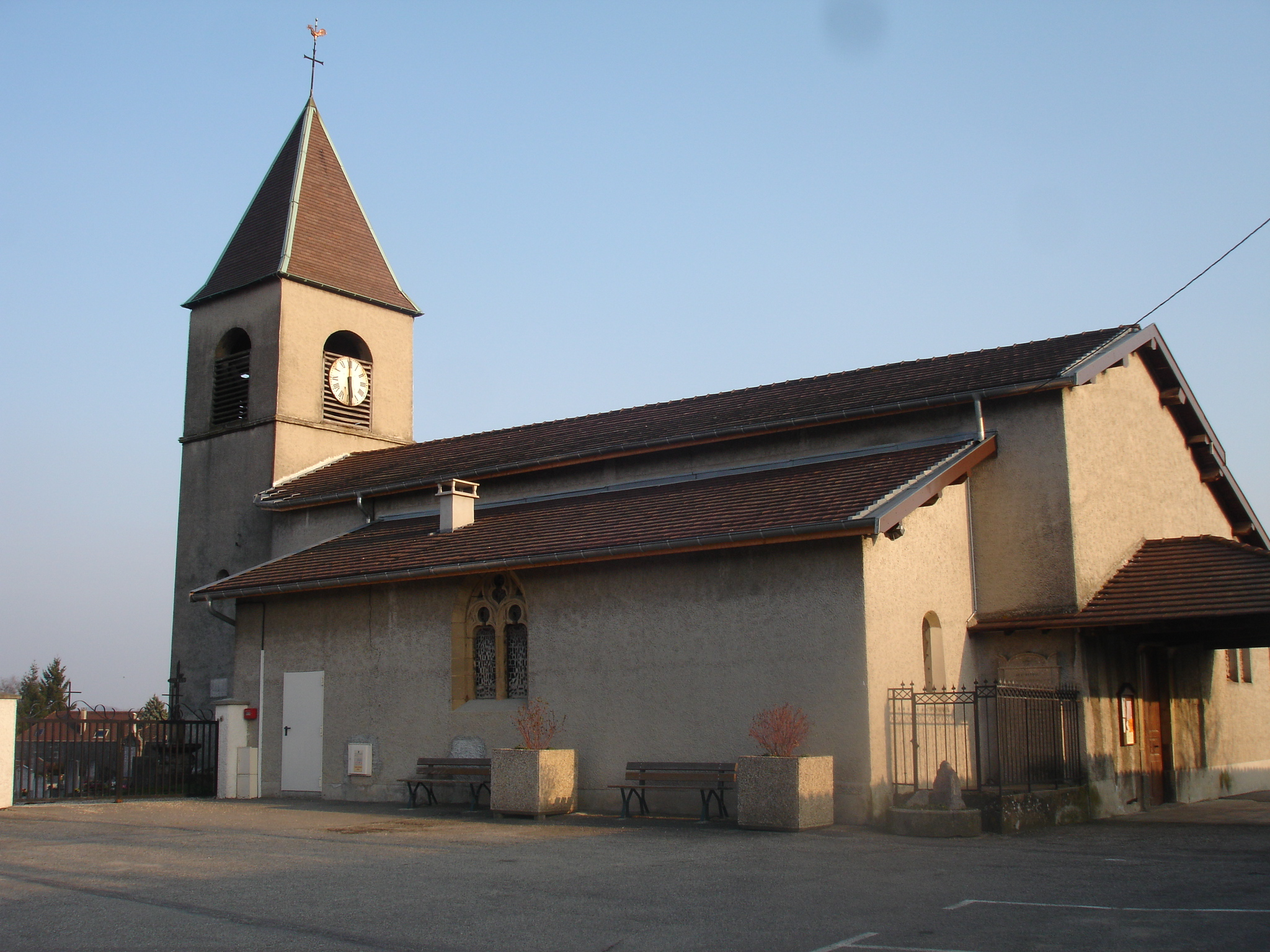
- The church of Chuzelles

- Coat of arms
- Location of Chuzelles
- Location within France Location within Auvergne-Rhône-Alpes
- Coordinates: 45°35′11″N 4°52′42″E
- Country: France
- Region: Auvergne-Rhône-Alpes
- Department: Isère
- Arrondissement: Vienne
- Canton: Vienne-1
- Intercommunality: CA Vienne Condrieu

Government
  - Mayor (2020–2026): Nicolas Hyvernat
- Area^{1}: 13.03 km^{2} (5.03 sq mi)
- Elevation: 212 m (696 ft)
- Highest elevation: 361 m (1,184 ft)
- Lowest elevation: 165 m (541 ft)
- Population (2023): 2,366
  - Density: 181.6/km^{2} (470.3/sq mi)
- Time zone: UTC+01:00 (CET)
  - Summer (DST): UTC+02:00 (CEST)
- INSEE/Postal code: 38110 /38200
- ^{1} French Land Register data, which excludes lakes, ponds, glaciers > 1 km^{2} (0.386 sq mi or 247 acres) and river estuaries.

Chuzelles (French pronunciation: [ʃyzɛl]) is a commune in the Isère department in southeastern France.

== Population ==
Historical population

Year	Pop.	±% p.a.
1876	616	—
1881	591	−0.83%
1886	602	+0.37%
1891	610	+0.26%
1896	578	−1.07%
1901	595	+0.58%
1906	587	−0.27%
1911	537	−1.76%
1921	471	−1.30%
1926	517	+1.88%
1931	534	+0.65%
1936	545	+0.41%

Year	Pop.	±% p.a.
1946	522	−0.43%
1954	580	+1.33%
1962	623	+0.90%
1968	705	+2.08%
1975	1,017	+5.37%
1982	1,209	+2.50%
1990	1,681	+4.21%
1999	1,958	+1.71%
2007	2,060	+0.64%
2012	2,025	−0.34%
2017	2,181	+1.50%
2023	2,366	+1.37%

Source: EHESS and INSEE (1968-2023)

== See also ==
- Communes of the Isère department
