= Sainte-Colombe, Rhône =

Sainte-Colombe
- Commune
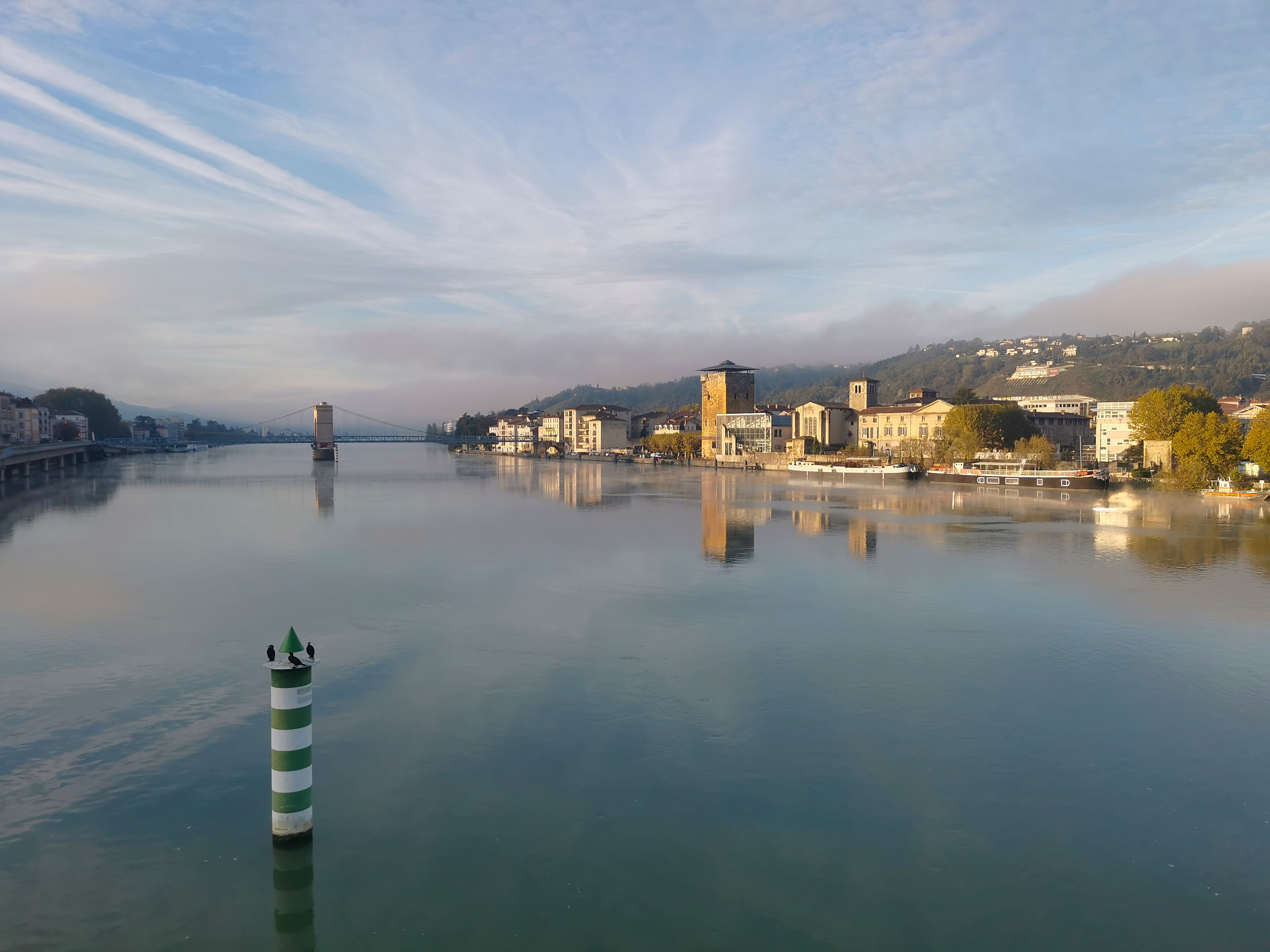
- Sainte-Colombe, as seen from the Lattre-de-Tassigny bridge (Vienne)

- Coat of arms
- Location of Sainte-Colombe
- Location within France Location within Auvergne-Rhône-Alpes
- Coordinates: 45°31′34″N 4°52′03″E
- Country: France
- Region: Auvergne-Rhône-Alpes
- Department: Rhône
- Arrondissement: Lyon
- Canton: Mornant
- Intercommunality: CA Vienne Condrieu

Government
  - Mayor (2020–2026): Marc Deleigue
- Area^{1}: 1.6 km^{2} (0.62 sq mi)
- Elevation: 155 m (509 ft)
- Highest elevation: 308 m (1,010 ft)
- Lowest elevation: 150 m (490 ft)
- Population (2023): 2,036
  - Density: 1,300/km^{2} (3,300/sq mi)
- Time zone: UTC+01:00 (CET)
  - Summer (DST): UTC+02:00 (CEST)
- INSEE/Postal code: 69189 /69560
- ^{1} French Land Register data, which excludes lakes, ponds, glaciers > 1 km^{2} (0.386 sq mi or 247 acres) and river estuaries.

Sainte-Colombe (French pronunciation: [sɛ̃t kɔlɔ̃b]; Arpitan: Sente-Colomba), sometimes referred to as Sainte-Colombe-lès-Vienne, is a commune in the Rhône department in eastern France. Occupied since Roman times, it is across the Rhône river from Vienne.

== Population ==
Historical population
Year	Pop.	±% p.a.
1968	1,862	—
1975	1,722	−1.11%
1982	1,580	−1.22%
1990	1,560	−0.16%
1999	1,808	+1.65%
2007	1,923	+0.77%
2012	1,878	−0.47%
2017	1,909	+0.33%
2023	2,036	+1.08%
Source: INSEE

== Notable people ==
- Kenza Dali (1991), football player for Aston Villa and the France national team

== See also ==
- Communes of the Rhône department
- Maurice Luiset
