= Riverie =

- Commune
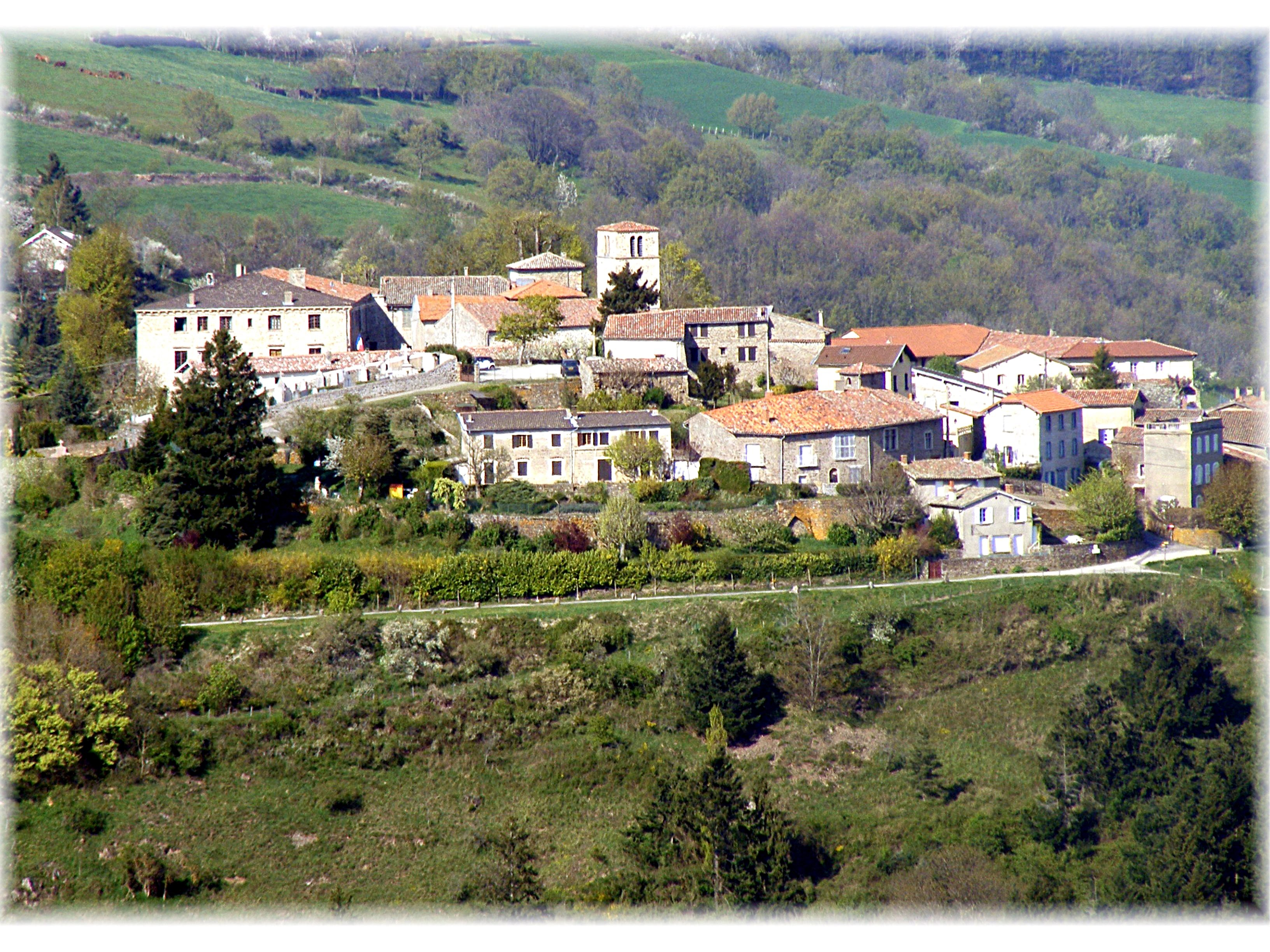
- The mediaeval village of Riverie

- Coat of arms
- Location of Riverie
- Location within France Location within Auvergne-Rhône-Alpes
- Coordinates: 45°36′02″N 4°35′21″E
- Country: France
- Region: Auvergne-Rhône-Alpes
- Department: Rhône
- Arrondissement: Lyon
- Canton: Mornant

Government
  - Mayor (2020–2026): Isabelle Brouillet
- Area^{1}: 0.4 km^{2} (0.15 sq mi)
- Elevation: 730 m (2,400 ft)
- Highest elevation: 731 m (2,398 ft)
- Lowest elevation: 613 m (2,011 ft)
- Population (2023): 293
  - Density: 730/km^{2} (1,900/sq mi)
- Time zone: UTC+01:00 (CET)
  - Summer (DST): UTC+02:00 (CEST)
- INSEE/Postal code: 69166 /69440
- ^{1} French Land Register data, which excludes lakes, ponds, glaciers > 1 km^{2} (0.386 sq mi or 247 acres) and river estuaries.

Riverie (French pronunciation: [ʁivʁi]) is a commune in the Rhône department in eastern France.

== See also ==
- Communes of the Rhône department
