= Saint-Romain-en-Gal =

- Commune
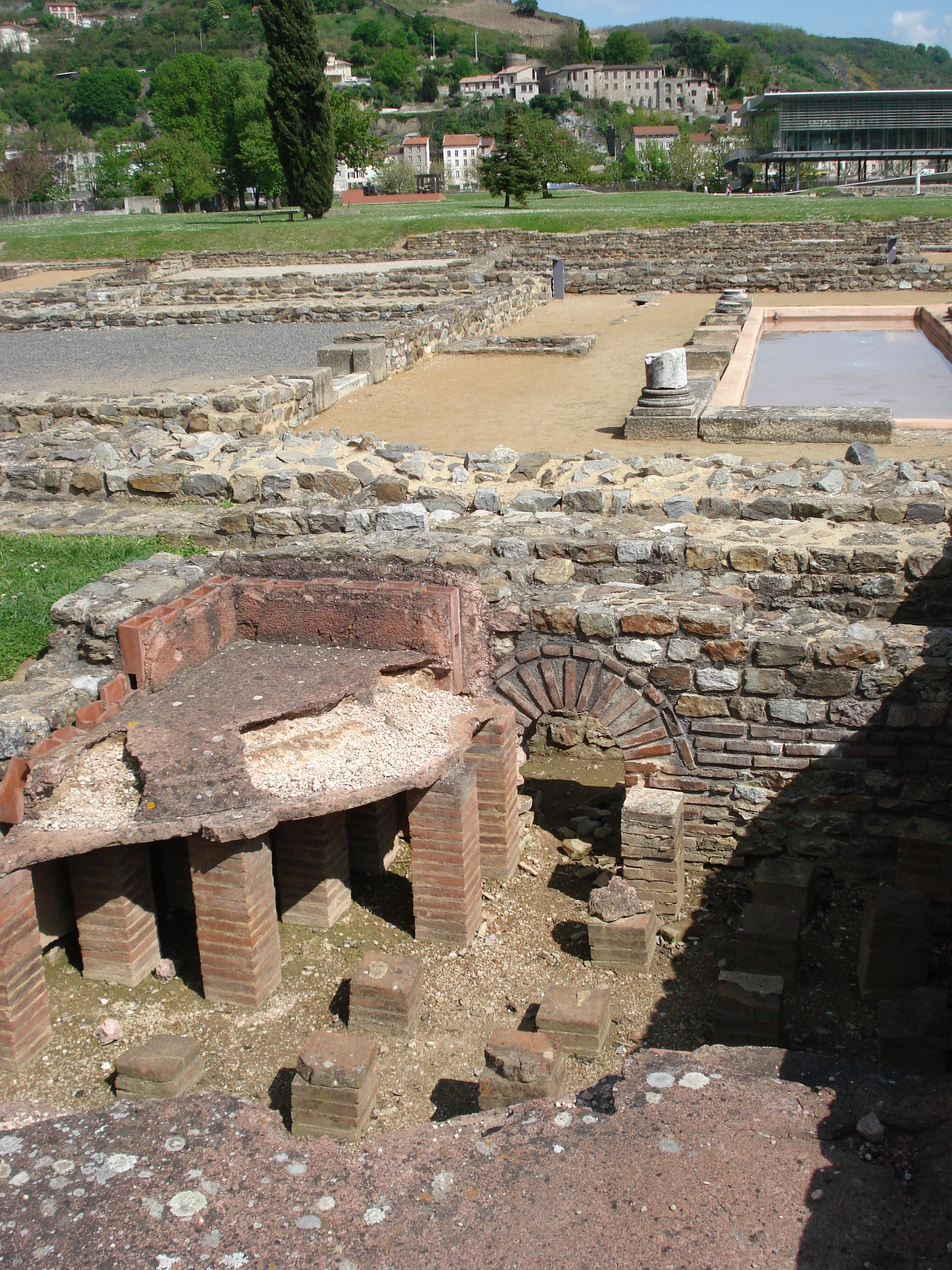
- An archaeological site in Saint-Romain-en-Gal

- Coat of arms
- Location of Saint-Romain-en-Gal
- Location within France Location within Auvergne-Rhône-Alpes
- Coordinates: 45°31′59″N 4°51′43″E
- Country: France
- Region: Auvergne-Rhône-Alpes
- Department: Rhône
- Arrondissement: Lyon
- Canton: Mornant
- Intercommunality: CA Vienne Condrieu

Government
  - Mayor (2020–2026): Luc Thomas
- Area^{1}: 13.39 km^{2} (5.17 sq mi)
- Elevation: 153 m (502 ft)
- Highest elevation: 528 m (1,732 ft)
- Lowest elevation: 140 m (460 ft)
- Population (2023): 2,001
  - Density: 149.4/km^{2} (387.0/sq mi)
- Time zone: UTC+01:00 (CET)
  - Summer (DST): UTC+02:00 (CEST)
- INSEE/Postal code: 69235 /69560
- ^{1} French Land Register data, which excludes lakes, ponds, glaciers > 1 km^{2} (0.386 sq mi or 247 acres) and river estuaries.

Saint-Romain-en-Gal (French pronunciation: [sɛ̃ ʁɔmɛ̃ ɑ̃ ɡal]; Arpitan: Sant-Reman-en-Gâl) is a commune in the Rhône department in eastern France. It is located 35 kilometres (22 mi) south of Lyon, on the west bank of the river Rhône. Vienne, Isère is on the opposite bank of the river and the two settlements are linked by a footbridge and a road bridge.

== Demography ==
Historical population
Year	Pop.	±% p.a.
1968	1,379	—
1975	1,346	−0.35%
1982	1,349	+0.03%
1990	1,341	−0.07%
1999	1,380	+0.32%
2007	1,634	+2.13%
2012	1,704	+0.84%
2017	1,889	+2.08%
2023	2,001	+0.96%
Source: INSEE

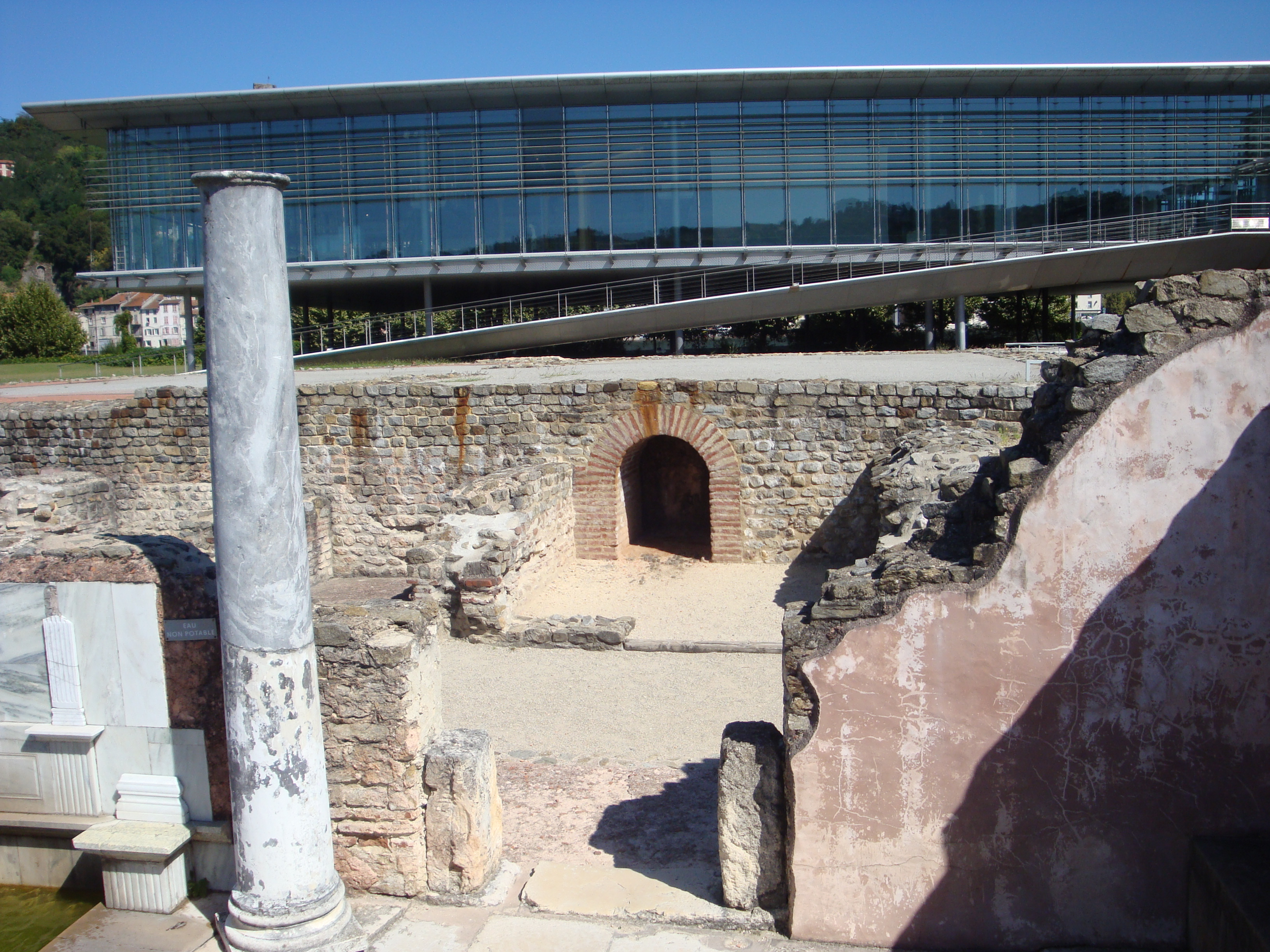
Gallo-Roman museum of Saint-Romain-en-Gal

== See also ==
- Communes of the Rhône department
