= Échalas =

- Commune
- Coat of arms
- Location of Échalas
- Location within France Location within Auvergne-Rhône-Alpes
- Coordinates: 45°33′10″N 4°42′58″E
- Country: France
- Region: Auvergne-Rhône-Alpes
- Department: Rhône
- Arrondissement: Lyon
- Canton: Mornant
- Intercommunality: CA Vienne Condrieu

Government
  - Mayor (2020–2026): Fabien Kraehn
- Area^{1}: 20.95 km^{2} (8.09 sq mi)
- Elevation: 297 m (974 ft)
- Highest elevation: 564 m (1,850 ft)
- Lowest elevation: 199 m (653 ft)
- Population (2023): 1,994
  - Density: 95.18/km^{2} (246.5/sq mi)
- Time zone: UTC+01:00 (CET)
  - Summer (DST): UTC+02:00 (CEST)
- INSEE/Postal code: 69080 /69700
- ^{1} French Land Register data, which excludes lakes, ponds, glaciers > 1 km^{2} (0.386 sq mi or 247 acres) and river estuaries.

Échalas (French pronunciation: [eʃala]) is a commune in the Rhône department in eastern France.

== See also ==
- Communes of the Rhône department
