= Septème =

- Commune
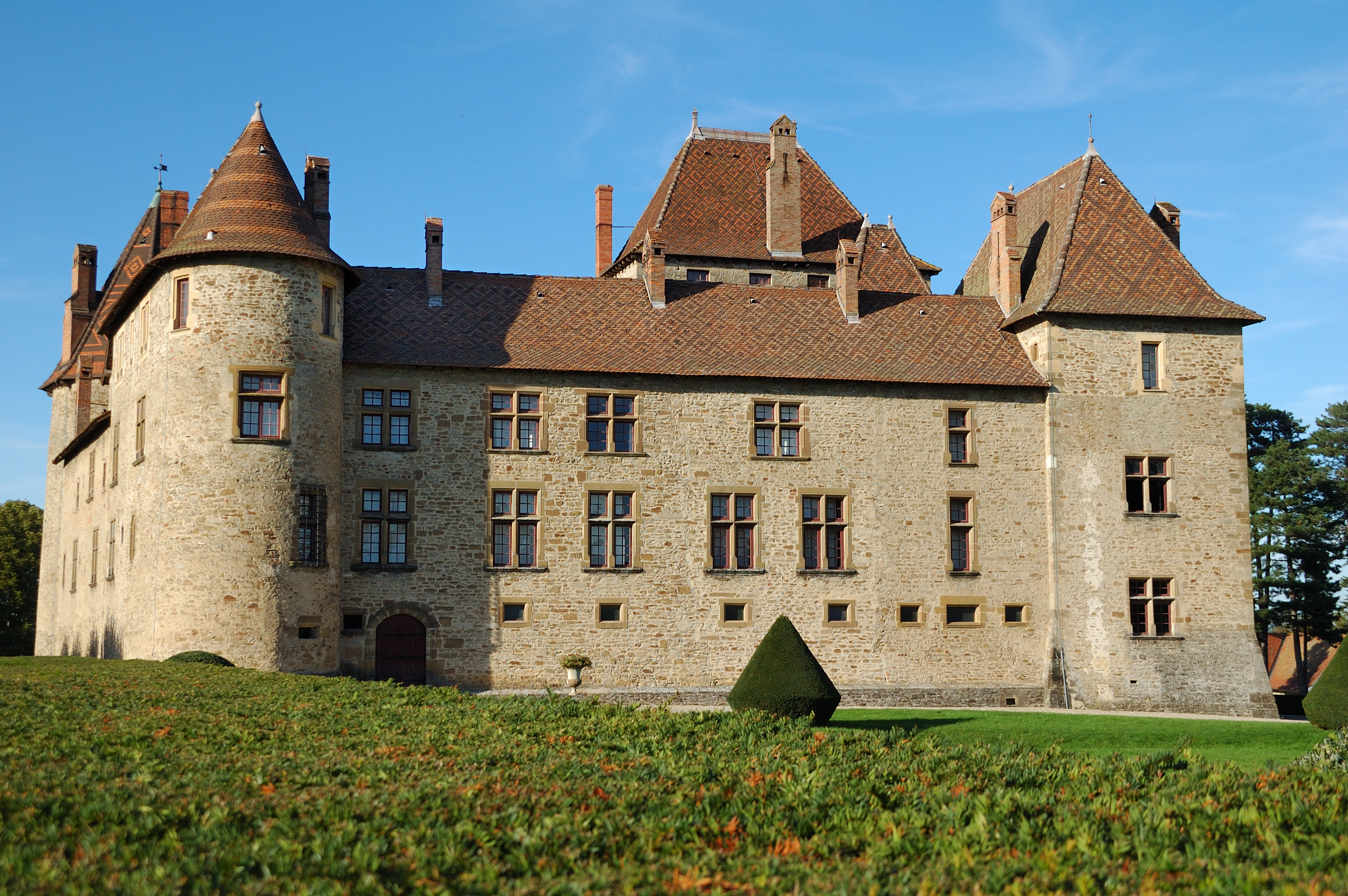
- Chateau
- Location of Septème
- Location within France Location within Auvergne-Rhône-Alpes
- Coordinates: 45°33′11″N 5°00′18″E
- Country: France
- Region: Auvergne-Rhône-Alpes
- Department: Isère
- Arrondissement: Vienne
- Canton: Vienne-1
- Intercommunality: CA Vienne Condrieu

Government
  - Mayor (2020–2026): Alain Clerc
- Area^{1}: 21.55 km^{2} (8.32 sq mi)
- Elevation: 235 m (771 ft)
- Highest elevation: 386 m (1,266 ft)
- Lowest elevation: 188 m (617 ft)
- Population (2023): 2,186
  - Density: 101.4/km^{2} (262.7/sq mi)
- Time zone: UTC+01:00 (CET)
  - Summer (DST): UTC+02:00 (CEST)
- INSEE/Postal code: 38480 /38780
- ^{1} French Land Register data, which excludes lakes, ponds, glaciers > 1 km^{2} (0.386 sq mi or 247 acres) and river estuaries.

Septème (French pronunciation: [sɛptɛm]; Arpitan: Septèmo) is a commune in the Isère department in southeastern France.

== History ==
The name of Septème reflects its location: at the seventh milepost on the Roman road between Vienne and Milan. A Roman camp had been established here, on a hill overlooking the valley.

A castle was recorded here in the 11th century and the village developed next to it. During the second half of the 12th century, the site was encircled by a strong enceinte one kilometre in length with three gates. After the unification of Septème to Dauphiné, a more modern castle was constructed in the 14th and 15th centuries.

The village has grown beyond the original enceinte, and now extends as far as the river.

== Population ==
Historical population

Year	Pop.	±% p.a.
1793	1,258	—
1821	1,777	+1.24%
1846	2,951	+2.05%
1872	1,524	−2.51%
1901	1,200	−0.82%
1926	1,155	−0.15%
1946	737	−2.22%
1962	792	+0.45%
1968	799	+0.15%

Year	Pop.	±% p.a.
1975	865	+1.14%
1982	1,048	+2.78%
1990	1,267	+2.40%
1999	1,471	+1.67%
2007	1,756	+2.24%
2012	1,844	+0.98%
2017	2,063	+2.27%
2023	2,186	+0.97%

Source: EHESS and INSEE (1968-2023)

== Personalities ==
- Gabriel Veyre, born in Septême in 1871, pharmacist, operator of Lumière cinematograph, filmmaker and photographer of the Sultan of Morocco

== See also ==
- Communes of the Isère department
