= Moidieu-Détourbe =

- Commune
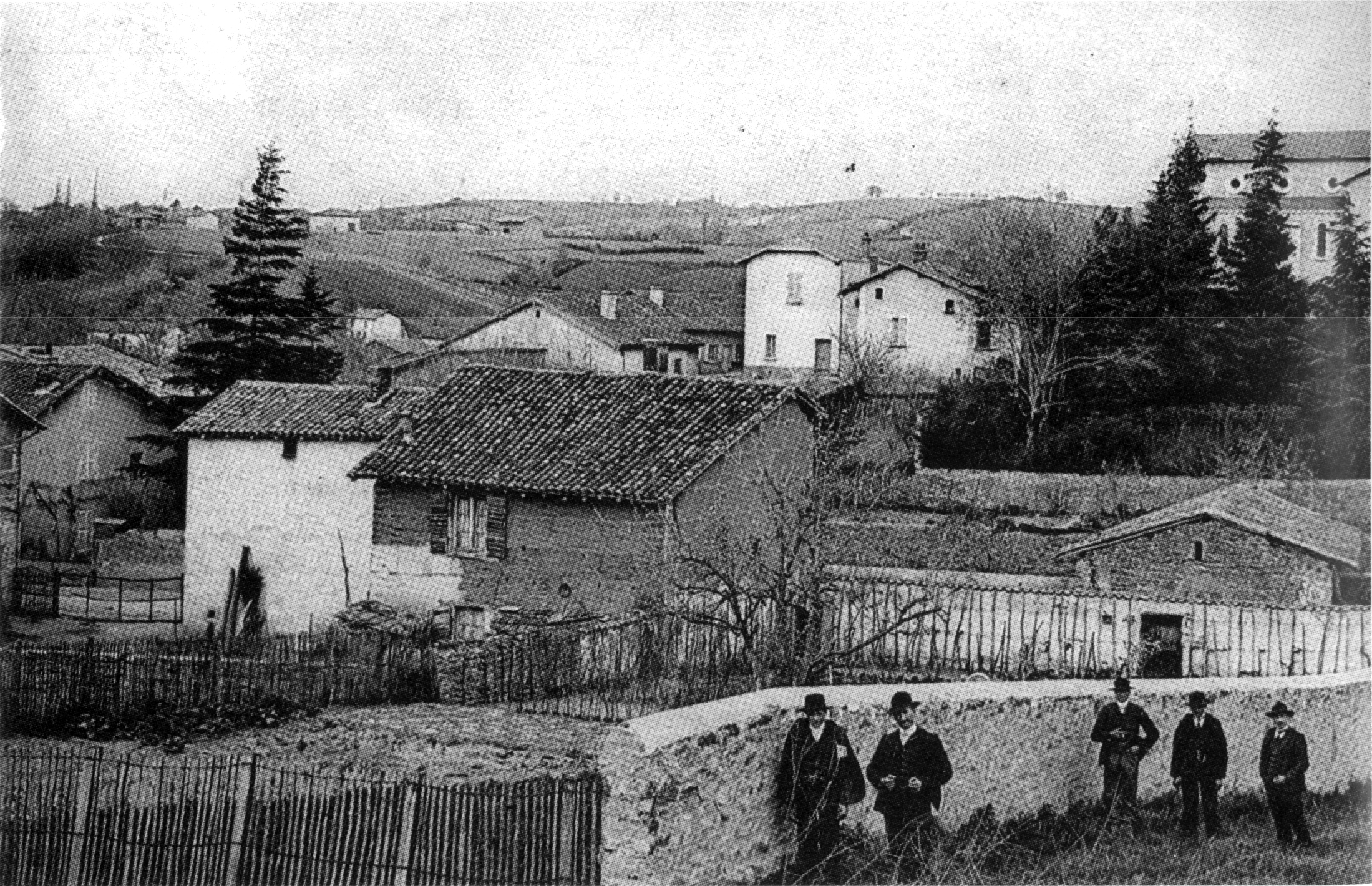
- Moidieu-Détourbe in 1925

- Coat of arms
- Location of Moidieu-Détourbe
- Location within France Location within Auvergne-Rhône-Alpes
- Coordinates: 45°29′34″N 5°00′25″E
- Country: France
- Region: Auvergne-Rhône-Alpes
- Department: Isère
- Arrondissement: Vienne
- Canton: Vienne-1
- Intercommunality: CA Vienne Condrieu

Government
  - Mayor (2021–2026): Christian Pétrequin
- Area^{1}: 18.04 km^{2} (6.97 sq mi)
- Elevation: 262 m (860 ft)
- Highest elevation: 423 m (1,388 ft)
- Lowest elevation: 235 m (771 ft)
- Population (2023): 1,978
  - Density: 109.6/km^{2} (284.0/sq mi)
- Time zone: UTC+01:00 (CET)
  - Summer (DST): UTC+02:00 (CEST)
- INSEE/Postal code: 38238 /38440
- ^{1} French Land Register data, which excludes lakes, ponds, glaciers > 1 km^{2} (0.386 sq mi or 247 acres) and river estuaries.

Moidieu-Détourbe (French pronunciation: [mwadjø detuʁb]) is a commune in the Isère department in southeastern France.

== Population ==
Historical population
Year	Pop.	±% p.a.
1968	675	—
1975	638	−0.80%
1982	955	+5.93%
1990	1,158	+2.44%
1999	1,411	+2.22%
2007	1,713	+2.45%
2012	1,815	+1.16%
2017	1,889	+0.80%
2023	1,978	+0.77%
Source: INSEE

== See also ==
- Communes of the Isère department
