= Condrieu =

Condrieu Couendriô (Arpitan)
- Commune
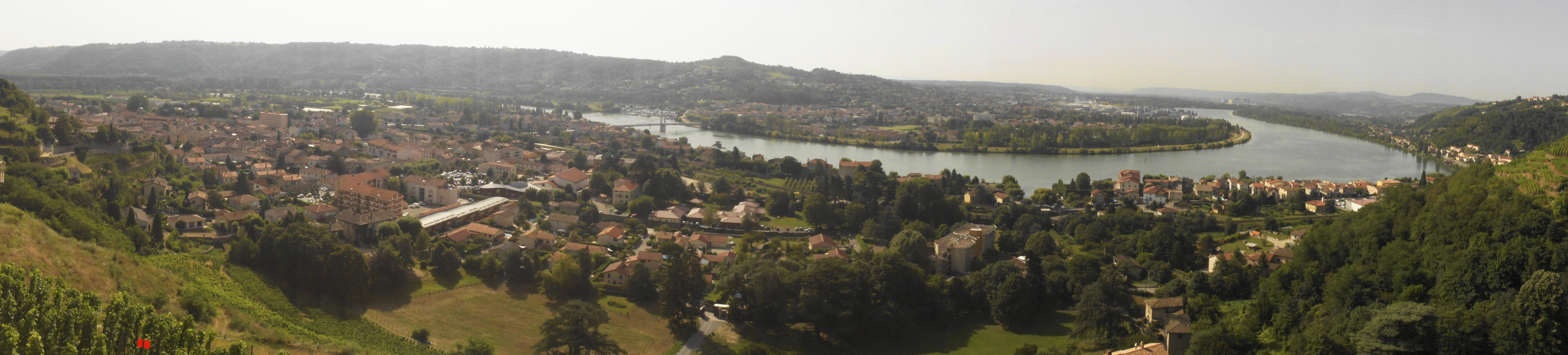
- A panoramic view of Condrieu

- Coat of arms
- Location of Condrieu
- Location within France Location within Auvergne-Rhône-Alpes
- Coordinates: 45°27′50″N 4°46′06″E
- Country: France
- Region: Auvergne-Rhône-Alpes
- Department: Rhône
- Arrondissement: Lyon
- Canton: Mornant
- Intercommunality: CA Vienne Condrieu

Government
  - Mayor (2020–2026): Philippe Marion
- Area^{1}: 9.21 km^{2} (3.56 sq mi)
- Elevation: 230 m (750 ft)
- Highest elevation: 460 m (1,510 ft)
- Lowest elevation: 146 m (479 ft)
- Population (2023): 3,957
  - Density: 430/km^{2} (1,110/sq mi)
- Time zone: UTC+01:00 (CET)
  - Summer (DST): UTC+02:00 (CEST)
- INSEE/Postal code: 69064 /69420
- ^{1} French Land Register data, which excludes lakes, ponds, glaciers > 1 km^{2} (0.386 sq mi or 247 acres) and river estuaries.

Condrieu (French pronunciation: [kɔ̃dʁijø]; Arpitan: Couendriô [kwɛ̃.ˈdʁjo]) is a commune in the Rhône department in eastern France.

It is situated on the right bank of the Rhône, some 11 km (6.8 mi) south of Vienne and 44 km south of Lyon, at the foot of the lower slopes of the Mont Monnet. It has an area of 921 hectares. Its altitude ranges from 146 to 460 metres.

Condrieu produces white wine, Condrieu AOC, and goat milk cheese, the Rigotte de Condrieu.

== Population ==
Historical population
Year	Pop.	±% p.a.
1968	3,411	—
1975	3,132	−1.21%
1982	3,078	−0.25%
1990	3,093	+0.06%
1999	3,424	+1.14%
2007	3,694	+0.95%
2012	3,856	+0.86%
2017	3,897	+0.21%
2023	3,957	+0.25%
Source: INSEE

== See also ==
- French wine
- Communes of the Rhône department
