= Communauté d'agglomération Vienne Condrieu =

Vienne Condrieu
- Communauté d'agglomération
- Interactive map of Vienne Condrieu
- Coordinates: 45°31′N 04°53′E
- Country: France
- Region: Auvergne-Rhône-Alpes
- Department: Isère, Rhône
- No. of communes: {{{nbcomm}}}
- Established: 2017
- Area: 419.0 km^{2} (161.8 sq mi)
- Population (2018): 90,357
  - Density: 215.6/km^{2} (558.5/sq mi)
- Website: www.vienne-condrieu-agglomeration.fr

Communauté d'agglomération Vienne Condrieu, also: Vienne Condrieu Agglomération, is an intercommunal structure, centred on the city of Vienne. It is located in the Isère and Rhône departments, in the Auvergne-Rhône-Alpes region, eastern France. It was created in January 2017. Its seat is in Vienne. Its area is 419.0 km^{2}. Its population was 90,357 in 2018, of which 29,583 in Vienne proper.

== Composition ==
The communauté d'agglomération consists of the following 30 communes, of which 12 in the Rhône department:

1. Ampuis
2. Chasse-sur-Rhône
3. Chonas-l'Amballan
4. Chuzelles
5. Condrieu
6. Les Côtes-d'Arey
7. Échalas
8. Estrablin
9. Eyzin-Pinet
10. Les Haies
11. Jardin
12. Loire-sur-Rhône
13. Longes
14. Luzinay
15. Meyssiez
16. Moidieu-Détourbe
17. Pont-Évêque
18. Reventin-Vaugris
19. Saint-Cyr-sur-le-Rhône
20. Sainte-Colombe
21. Saint-Romain-en-Gal
22. Saint-Romain-en-Gier
23. Saint-Sorlin-de-Vienne
24. Septème
25. Serpaize
26. Seyssuel
27. Trèves
28. Tupin-et-Semons
29. Vienne
30. Villette-de-Vienne
