= Meyssiez =

- Commune
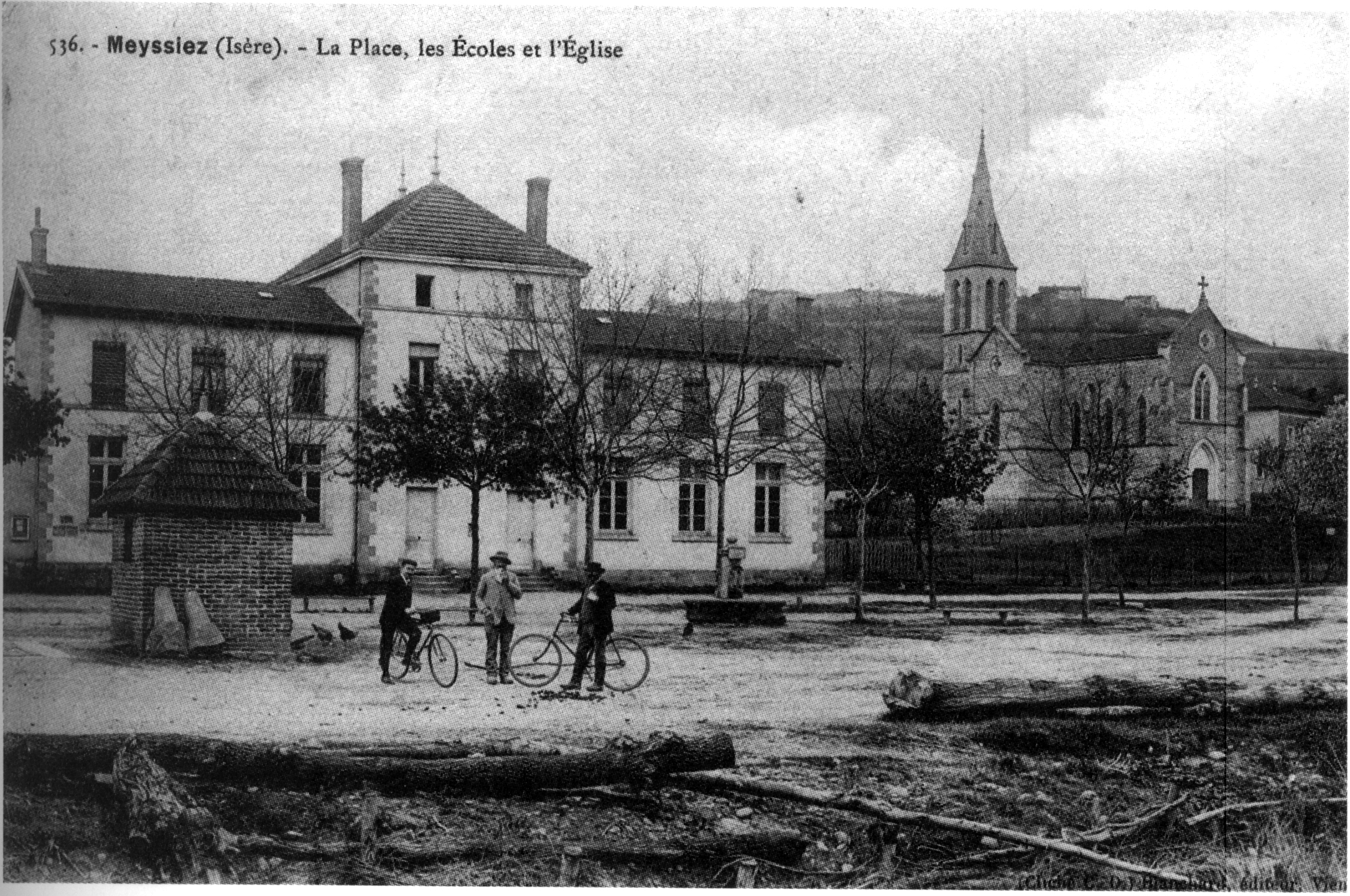
- Meyssiez in 1912

- Coat of arms
- Location of Meyssiez
- Location within France Location within Auvergne-Rhône-Alpes
- Coordinates: 45°28′16″N 5°03′17″E
- Country: France
- Region: Auvergne-Rhône-Alpes
- Department: Isère
- Arrondissement: Vienne
- Canton: Bièvre
- Intercommunality: CA Vienne Condrieu

Government
  - Mayor (2024–2026): Hubert Girard
- Area^{1}: 13.88 km^{2} (5.36 sq mi)
- Elevation: 315 m (1,033 ft)
- Highest elevation: 477 m (1,565 ft)
- Lowest elevation: 280 m (920 ft)
- Population (2023): 671
  - Density: 48.3/km^{2} (125/sq mi)
- Demonym: Meyssiard(s) Meyssiarde(s)
- Time zone: UTC+01:00 (CET)
  - Summer (DST): UTC+02:00 (CEST)
- INSEE/Postal code: 38232 /38440
- ^{1} French Land Register data, which excludes lakes, ponds, glaciers > 1 km^{2} (0.386 sq mi or 247 acres) and river estuaries.

Meyssiez (French pronunciation: [mɛsje]; before 2013: Meyssiès) is a commune in the Isère department in southeastern France.

== Geography ==
Meyssiez is a rural commune situated in the northwestern part of the Isère department, nestled between the cities of Vienne, Bourgoin-Jallieu, and Grenoble. The area is characterized by dispersed habitation.

The commune is traversed by the Gère River, a tributary of the Rhône, which originates in the Bonnevaux forest near Lieudieu. Additionally, two of its tributaries, the Girand (left bank) and the Valaize (right bank), border the western part of Meyssiez.

As of 2010, Meyssiez experiences an altered oceanic climate. The area enjoys ample sunshine during summer, significant annual temperature variations, dry air across seasons with summer thunderstorms, strong winds like the mistral, and high precipitation in autumn. Between 1971 and 2000, the average annual temperature was approximately 12 °C, with annual precipitation around 800 mm. From 1991 to 2020, data from the nearest meteorological station in Luzinay indicated an average annual temperature of 12.6 °C and similar precipitation levels.

The LGV Rhône-Alpes high-speed rail line, operational since 1994, passes through Meyssiez, facilitating efficient travel around the Lyon metropolitan area before connecting to Valence TGV station. The Meyssiez tunnel, part of this line, lies within the territories of Meyssiez and Cour-et-Buis. Nearby railway stations include Le Péage-de-Roussillon and Vienne, both situated on the Paris-Lyon to Marseille-Saint-Charles line.

== Population ==
Meyssiez falls under the jurisdiction of the Grenoble Academy. The local school, "École des Sources," comprises two distinct buildings: one for kindergarten and another for elementary education. Notably, the elementary school building, centrally located in the village, has remained unchanged for 130 years. Renovations undertaken during 2020-2021 preserved its architectural style.

Historical population
Year	Pop.	±% p.a.
1968	300	—
1975	288	−0.58%
1982	440	+6.24%
1990	484	+1.20%
1999	535	+1.12%
2007	612	+1.70%
2012	605	−0.23%
2017	637	+1.04%
2023	671	+0.87%
Source: INSEE

== See also ==
- Communes of the Isère department
