= Loire-sur-Rhône =

- Commune
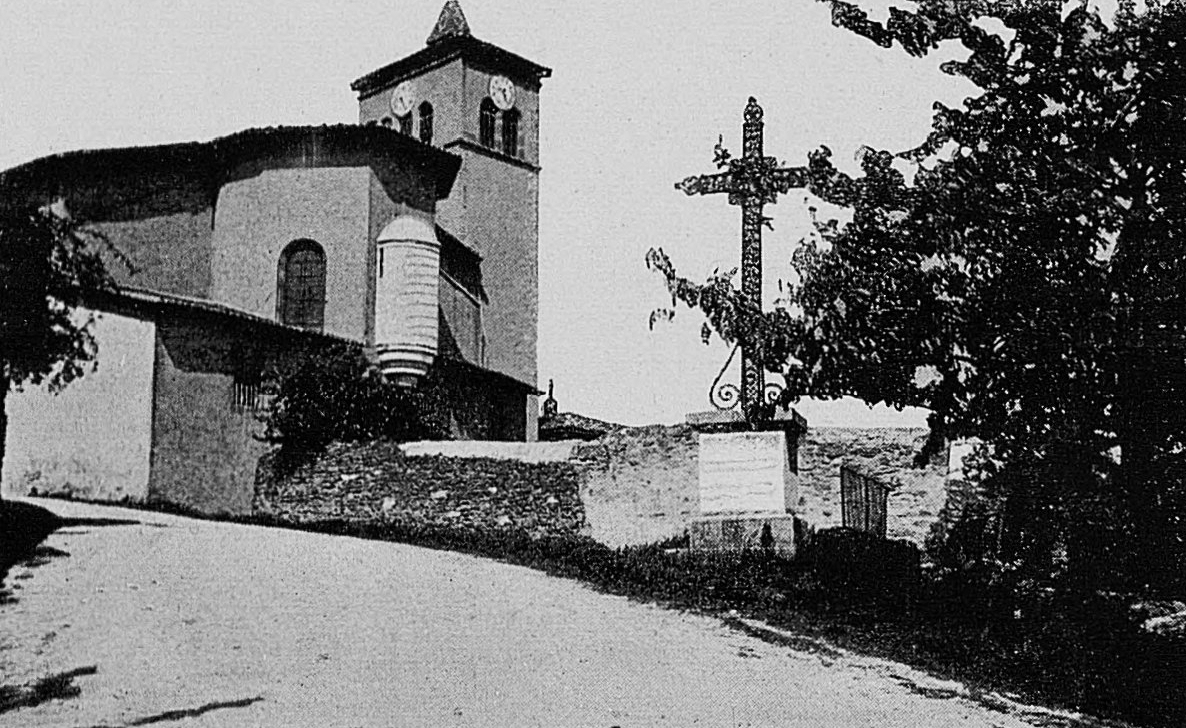
- The church in Loire-sur-Rhône, at the beginning of the 20th century
- Location of Loire-sur-Rhône
- Location within France Location within Auvergne-Rhône-Alpes
- Coordinates: 45°33′41″N 4°48′25″E
- Country: France
- Region: Auvergne-Rhône-Alpes
- Department: Rhône
- Arrondissement: Lyon
- Canton: Mornant
- Intercommunality: CA Vienne Condrieu

Government
  - Mayor (2020–2026): Guy Martinet
- Area^{1}: 16.6 km^{2} (6.4 sq mi)
- Elevation: 157 m (515 ft)
- Highest elevation: 548 m (1,798 ft)
- Lowest elevation: 145 m (476 ft)
- Population (2023): 2,746
  - Density: 165/km^{2} (428/sq mi)
- Time zone: UTC+01:00 (CET)
  - Summer (DST): UTC+02:00 (CEST)
- INSEE/Postal code: 69118 /69700
- ^{1} French Land Register data, which excludes lakes, ponds, glaciers > 1 km^{2} (0.386 sq mi or 247 acres) and river estuaries.

Loire-sur-Rhône (French pronunciation: [lwaʁ syʁ ʁon], literally Loire on Rhône) is a commune in the Rhône department in eastern France.

== Population ==
Historical population
Year	Pop.	±% p.a.
1968	1,950	—
1975	1,788	−1.23%
1982	1,937	+1.15%
1990	1,927	−0.06%
1999	2,126	+1.10%
2007	2,328	+1.14%
2012	2,473	+1.22%
2017	2,559	+0.69%
2023	2,746	+1.18%
Source: INSEE

== See also ==
- Communes of the Rhône department
