= Maurice Luiset =

French financier and entrepreneur

- Born: 1871
- Died: 1942 (aged 70–71)
- Occupations: Financier, entrepreneur, industrialist
- Known for: Creator of Mir detergent; founder of Ets. Luiset

Maurice Luiset (1871 – 1942) was a French financier and entrepreneur who created several mainstream consumer-good products such as Mir, the world's oldest existing, and continental Europe's first detergent, the perfume Porte-Bonheur and a hygiene and beauty product La Mondiale. Maurice Luiset also owned one of the largest candle manufacturing businesses in France, a bee-keeping products business that sold under the brand name La Colombe and merchant ships that he used for import and export activities. He based his business operations out of Vienne, near Lyon, France.

== Overview ==
Maurice Luiset is best known for having created the first non-bleach detergent, MIR, an innovation that gave rebirth to the waning textile industry of the Lyon area as it improved operating efficiencies in the washing of silks and fine textiles. The detergent (which was sold to Cotelle & Fouchet in 1923 and is currently a portfolio product of Henkel Group) remains one of the most a popular detergents in France and is one of the most recognizable brand names in France, with 99% recognition rate amongst the French female adult population.

Maurice Luiset first founded a candle manufacturing business, Ets. Luiset in Sainte-Colombe-les-Vienne. He was successful and branched out into a myriad of activities including consumer goods, industrial products related to bee-keeping, import and export shipping, and financing activities of various types including stock market and sovereign debt speculation.

Shortly before the Russian revolution of 1917, Maurice Luiset invested a significant amount of his wealth in Czar Nicholas II's regime bonds, which had lost the majority of their value, speculating that the Revolution would fail and the bonds' value would rally; as the future communist nation fell into the hands of the Bolsheviks so too did his investments. He focused his later year efforts on innovations in the detergent, perfume and other chemical products and on the study of bee-keeping and the effect of bee pollination on tree varieties.

Maurice Luiset died of pancreatic cancer in 1942, at the age of 70.
