= Pont-Évêque =

- Commune
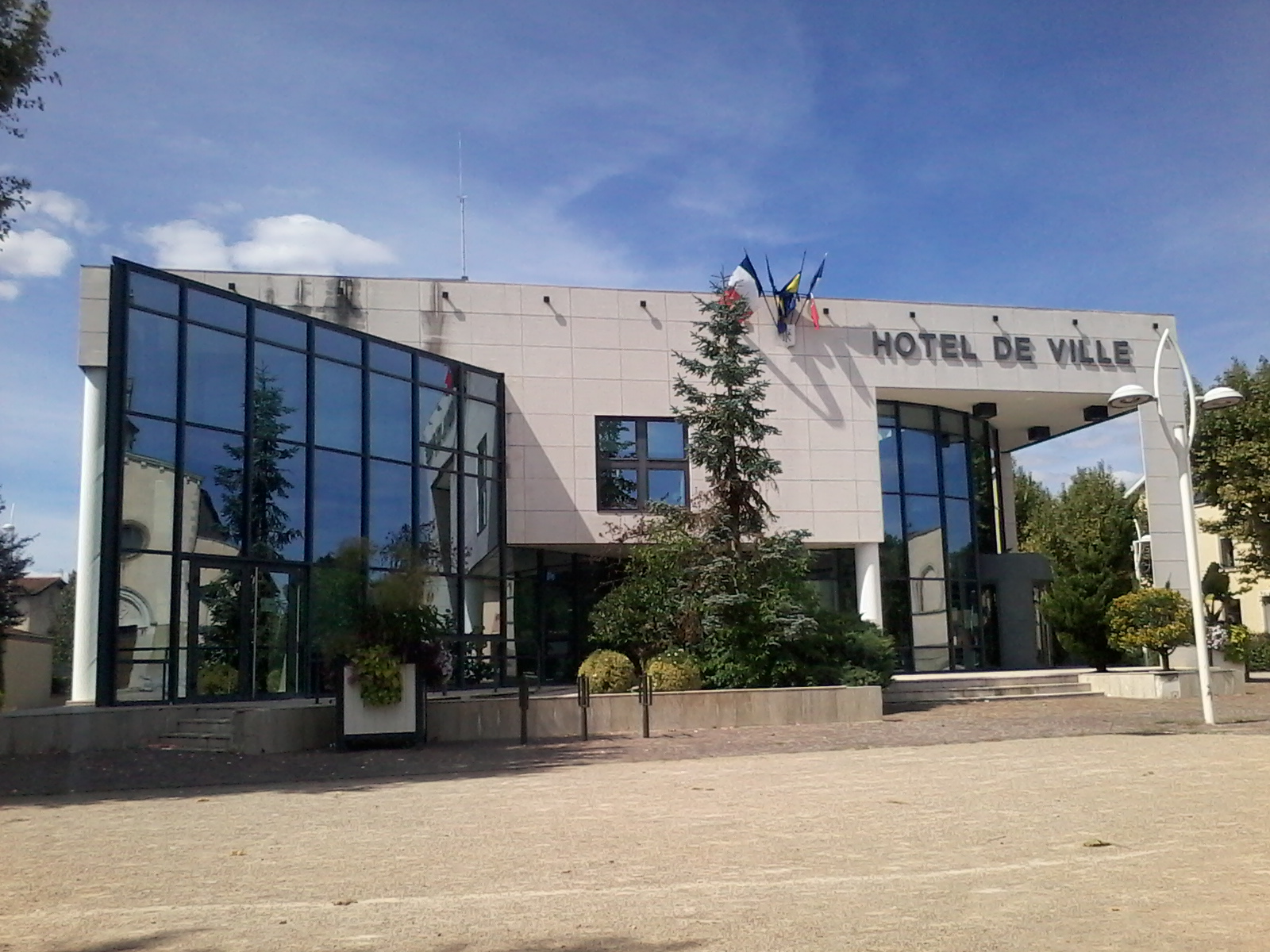
- The town hall of Pont-Évêque

- Coat of arms
- Location of Pont-Évêque
- Location within France Location within Auvergne-Rhône-Alpes
- Coordinates: 45°31′52″N 4°54′43″E
- Country: France
- Region: Auvergne-Rhône-Alpes
- Department: Isère
- Arrondissement: Vienne
- Canton: Vienne-1
- Intercommunality: CA Vienne Condrieu

Government
  - Mayor (2020–2026): Martine Faita
- Area^{1}: 8.76 km^{2} (3.38 sq mi)
- Elevation: 220 m (720 ft)
- Highest elevation: 321 m (1,053 ft)
- Lowest elevation: 165 m (541 ft)
- Population (2023): 6,213
  - Density: 709/km^{2} (1,840/sq mi)
- Time zone: UTC+01:00 (CET)
  - Summer (DST): UTC+02:00 (CEST)
- INSEE/Postal code: 38318 /38780
- ^{1} French Land Register data, which excludes lakes, ponds, glaciers > 1 km^{2} (0.386 sq mi or 247 acres) and river estuaries.

Pont-Évêque (French pronunciation: [pɔ̃.t‿evɛk]) is a commune in the Isère department in southeastern France.

== Population ==
Historical population

Year	Pop.	±% p.a.
1872	1,799	—
1876	1,662	−1.96%
1881	1,752	+1.06%
1886	1,656	−1.12%
1891	1,409	−3.18%
1896	1,344	−0.94%
1901	1,357	+0.19%
1906	1,462	+1.50%
1911	1,586	+1.64%
1921	1,563	−0.15%
1926	1,652	+1.11%
1931	1,651	−0.01%
1936	1,695	+0.53%

Year	Pop.	±% p.a.
1946	1,677	−0.11%
1954	1,725	+0.35%
1962	1,881	+1.09%
1968	2,148	+2.24%
1975	5,636	+14.78%
1982	5,542	−0.24%
1990	5,385	−0.36%
1999	5,067	−0.67%
2007	5,108	+0.10%
2012	5,106	−0.01%
2017	5,210	+0.40%
2023	6,213	+2.98%

Source: EHESS and INSEE (1968-2023)

== Twin towns ==
Pont-Évêque is twinned with:

- Glynneath, Wales, since 1993
- Imbersago, Italy, since 2003

== See also ==
- Communes of the Isère department
