= Canton of Saint-Héand =

Coordinates: 45.5144°N 4.4154°E

Saint-Héand
- Former canton
- Interactive map of Saint-Héand
- Country: France
- Region: Auvergne-Rhône-Alpes
- Department: Loire
- No. of communes: {{{nbcomm}}}
- Disbanded: 2015
- Area: 122.62 km^{2} (47.34 sq mi)
- Population (2012): 29,539
  - Density: 240.90/km^{2} (623.92/sq mi)

The canton of Saint-Héand is a French former administrative division located in the department of Loire and the Rhône-Alpes region. It was disbanded following the French canton reorganisation which came into effect in March 2015. It consisted of 9 communes, which joined the new canton of Sorbiers in 2015. It had 29,539 inhabitants (2012).

The canton comprised the following communes:

- L'Étrat
- Fontanès
- La Fouillouse
- Marcenod
- Saint-Christo-en-Jarez
- Saint-Héand
- Sorbiers
- La Talaudière
- La Tour-en-Jarez

== See also ==
- Cantons of the Loire department
