= A47 autoroute =

Road in France

A47 autoroute

Route information
- Maintained by DIR Centre-Est
- Length: 29.5 km (18.3 mi)
- Existed: 1962–present

Major junctions
- North end: E15 / A 7 / E15 / A 46 in Ternay

- South end: N 88 in Saint-Chamond

Location
- Country: France

Highway system
- Roads in France; Autoroutes; Routes nationales

The A47 autoroute is a 29.5-kilometre-long (18.3 mi) highway in central France. Completed in 1983 it connects Givors (Lyon) to Saint-Étienne. It also serves the suburbs south-west of Lyon and east of Saint-Étienne.

== Characteristics ==
- Toll free motorway
- 2x2 lanes
- 45 km long

== History ==
- 1953 and 1962: Opening of the central section between Saint-Chamond and Rive-de-Gier (current Junction 11).
- 1970: Opening of an extension to Givors. In Givors, A47 is built on the site of an old road, which makes it run close to neighbouring buildings creating noise pollution.
- 1983: Opening of the short section between Givors and the junction with the A7 and A46 autoroutes. As a result, Lyon and St-Etienne are linked totally by motorway from beginning to end.
- 1991: Opening of the St-Chamond by-pass. The old A47 through St-Chamond was re-numbered the D288 (expressway).
- 1998: For the Football World Cup the section between St-Chamond and St-Etienne was widened to 2x3 lanes but this section is numbered the RN88.

== Future ==
There are plans to transform sections of the A47 into an urban boulevard if the A45 to Lyon and Saint-Etienne, bypassing Givors, is built.

== Junctions ==
Region	Department	Junction	Destinations	Notes
Auvergne-Rhône-Alpes	Rhône	A7 & A46 - A47	Lyon - centre & sud, Marseille, Valence, Vienne	
Auvergne-Rhône-Alpes	Rhône	A7 & A46 - A47	Lyon - est, Paris (A6), Strasbourg (A42), Grenoble (A43)	
Auvergne-Rhône-Alpes	Rhône	8 : Chasse-sur-Rhône	Chasse-sur-Rhône, Ternay	
Auvergne-Rhône-Alpes	Rhône	9.1 : Givors - Les Plaines	Givors - centre, Grigny	
Auvergne-Rhône-Alpes	Rhône	9.2 : Givors - centre	Givors	Exit only from Saint-Etienne
Auvergne-Rhône-Alpes	Rhône	9.3 : Givors Montrond	Mornant, Givors, Centre Commercial	Entry and exit from Lyon
Auvergne-Rhône-Alpes	Rhône	10 : Givors - ouest	Givors, Saint-Romain-en-Gier	
Auvergne-Rhône-Alpes	Rhône	Aire de Saint-Romain-en-Gier (Westbound)		
Auvergne-Rhône-Alpes	Loire	11 La Madelaine	Saint-Martin-la-Plaine, Rive-de-Gier, Brignais, Mornant, Chabanière - La Madeleine	
Auvergne-Rhône-Alpes	Loire	12 : Sardon	Lorette, Genilac, Rive-de-Gier	
Auvergne-Rhône-Alpes	Loire	13 : La Grand-Croix	Saint-Paul-en-Jarez, Cellieu, La Grand-Croix, Lorette, Parc du Pilat	
Auvergne-Rhône-Alpes	Loire	14 : Saint-Chamond - centre	Saint-Chamond, L'Horme	Entry and exit from Lyon
Auvergne-Rhône-Alpes	Loire	15 : Saint-Chamond - Stélytec	Saint-Chamond, Cellieu, L'Horme	
Auvergne-Rhône-Alpes	Loire	15 : Saint-Chamond - Stélytec	Aire du Pays du Gier	
Auvergne-Rhône-Alpes	Loire	16 : Saint-Chamond - ouest	Saint-Chamond - La Varizelle, Sorbiers, Parc du Pilat	
Auvergne-Rhône-Alpes	Loire	A 47 becomes N 88		
Auvergne-Rhône-Alpes	Loire	17 : Saint-Chamond - La Varizelle	Saint-Chamond - Izieux + Zone Commerciale	
Auvergne-Rhône-Alpes	Loire	Aire de la Chabure (Eastbound)		
Auvergne-Rhône-Alpes	Loire	18 : Saint-Étienne - Terrenoire	Saint-Étienne	Entry and exit from Saint-Etienne - centre
Auvergne-Rhône-Alpes	Loire	RN 88 & RN 488 (A72) - A47	Saint-Étienne - Autres Quartiers, Le Puy-en-Velay, Firminy	
Auvergne-Rhône-Alpes	Loire	RN 88 & RN 488 (A72) - A47	Saint-Étienne - centre, Feurs, Roanne, Thiers, Clermont-Ferrand (A89)	
1.000 mi = 1.609 km; 1.000 km = 0.621 mi
