= Canton of La Grand-Croix =

Coordinates: 45.4938°N 4.5623°E

La Grand-Croix
- Former canton
- Interactive map of La Grand-Croix
- Country: France
- Region: Auvergne-Rhône-Alpes
- Department: Loire
- No. of communes: {{{nbcomm}}}
- Disbanded: 2015
- Area: 99.89 km^{2} (38.57 sq mi)
- Population (2012): 24,646
  - Density: 246.7/km^{2} (639.0/sq mi)

The canton of La Grand-Croix is a French former administrative division located in the department of Loire and the Rhone-Alpes region. It was disbanded following the French canton reorganisation which came into effect in March 2015. It had 24,646 inhabitants (2012).

The canton comprised the following communes:

- Cellieu
- Chagnon
- Doizieux
- Farnay
- La Grand-Croix
- L'Horme
- Lorette
- Saint-Paul-en-Jarez
- La Terrasse-sur-Dorlay
- Valfleury

== See also ==
- Cantons of the Loire department
