= A45 autoroute =

Former planned autoroute in France

The A45 autoroute was a proposed motorway in central France scheduled to open in 2015. Work stopped after initial studies in 1993. It will be controlled by a motorway company as yet unannounced. It will be a toll road. It will replace the A47, known for being obsolete and accident-prone. It will be privately managed in order to profitably be capable of bearing the intense traffic that will be brought to it from the influx of motorists to the A45 who currently drive on the A47. The project was officially dropped in 2018.

== History ==
Initially the A45 ran from Pierre-Bénite to Brignais with one lane in each direction, it was later expanded to include two lanes in either direction. This section is now the A450.

The first feasibility studies for its construction began in 1993 (the preliminary studies between 1995 and 1996, were open for discussion in 1997. (Note: "Autoroute A 45 : Évaluation économique et sociale" (PDF). Archived from the original (PDF) on 2012-04-02. (13.3 MB), partie F – 1.3. Présentation générale du programme, pp. 408-411.) ), and studies for the preliminary design were conducted from 1999 to November 2005. The public inquiry for the A45 took place between November 24, 2006, and January 20, 2007. On July 17, 2008, after the grenelle de l'environnement, the Minister of Ecology and Regional Development, Jean-Louis Borloo declared the project as having public benefit. Since this declaration, no work has been started, and the project is currently at a halt.

== Project plan and goals ==
=== As an alternative to the A47 ===
The scheme involves the doubling of the A47 between Saint-Etienne and Lyon, more precisely between Pierre-Bénite and Fouillouse.

The project was instigated as a result of a debate held in 1993 rejecting a project to enlarge the A47, as it was concluded it would be too difficult to widen the A47 where it crossed through two communes, Givors and Rive-de-Gier. Additionally, there was a need for an alternative motorway to the A47 in the event of serious accidents or heavy traffic. Despite its inadequacies, the A47 is effectively the only current route for motor vehicle traffic between Lyon and Saint-Étienne.

Five junctions were set forth by the ministerial decision of February 12, 1999: at La Fouillouse (A72), Vallée d'Onzon (D 3 and north of Saint-Étienne), Saint-Chamond (A47), Rive-de-Gier (A47 and D 342 ex-D 42), and at Brignais (D 386 ex-N 86).

The A45 project, with an estimated cost of €1.3 billion excluding taxes, will be managed by an undetermined motorway company. The project will involve the construction of four tunnels and eleven viaducts. In exchange, the company will receive the proceeds of the tolls, and by order of Jean-Louis Borloo, a subsidy from the local governments of between €520 and €700 million.

Another goal is to open up the urban agglomeration around Saint-Étienne, in addition to serving as an alternative to the A47, which suffers from high traffic, and has a reputation for frequent accidents and having obsolete facilities. Improvements to the A47 will continue between Givors and Saint-Chamond after the A45 opens, much as was already done above Saint-Chamond, when Saint-Étienne was selected as a site for matches of the 1998 FIFA World Cup.

=== Current situation of the project site ===
The Lyon - Saint-Étienne route is one of the major routes of the Rhône-Alpes region. (Note: "Autoroute A 45 : Évaluation économique et sociale" (PDF). Archived from the original (PDF) on 2012-04-02. 2.2. Situation actuelle de l’offre et de la demande de transport, pp. 434-445.) The A7 experiences very heavy traffic, 94,900 vehicles a day in 2004.

=== The A45's route ===
Predicted path:

- 6 : Saint-Genis-Laval
- 7 : Brignais, Francheville
- 8 : Mornant, Givors
- 9 : Rive-de-Gier
- 10 : A47|A45 : Le Puy-en-Velay, Saint-Chamond; Cellieu
- 11 : La Talaudière
- A72|A45

The A45's route is predicted to go through four tunnels — at Bruyères (1,100m), Lavoué (600m), Crêt-Até (1,400m) and Mouille (600m); the total cost of which is estimated at €250 million, making up about a quarter of the entire budget.
