= Lorette, Loire =

Lorette
- Commune
- Coat of arms
- Location of Lorette
- Location within France Location within Auvergne-Rhône-Alpes
- Coordinates: 45°30′46″N 4°34′55″E
- Country: France
- Region: Auvergne-Rhône-Alpes
- Department: Loire
- Arrondissement: Saint-Étienne
- Canton: Rive-de-Gier
- Intercommunality: Saint-Étienne Métropole

Government
  - Mayor (2023–2026): Gérard Tardy
- Area^{1}: 3.41 km^{2} (1.32 sq mi)
- Elevation: 280 m (920 ft)
- Highest elevation: 500 m (1,600 ft)
- Lowest elevation: 257 m (843 ft)
- Population (2023): 4,983
  - Density: 1,460/km^{2} (3,780/sq mi)
- Time zone: UTC+01:00 (CET)
  - Summer (DST): UTC+02:00 (CEST)
- INSEE/Postal code: 42123 /42420
- ^{1} French Land Register data, which excludes lakes, ponds, glaciers > 1 km^{2} (0.386 sq mi or 247 acres) and river estuaries.

Lorette (French pronunciation: [lɔʁɛt]) is a commune in the Loire department in central France, in the Gier valley.

== Geography ==
Lorette lies in the valley of the Gier, a coal mining region, on the south bank of the Giers just east of La Grand-Croix. The Dorlay river, a tributary of the Gier that rises in Mont Pilat, defines the west border of the commune.

== History ==
The region was developed in the 19th century for coal mining. In 1830 the Jackson brothers (Frères Jackson) built a steel works at Assailly in what is now the north of Lorette. As a result of a merger, in 1854 this became part of the Compagnie des Hauts-fourneaux, forges et aciéries de la Marine et des chemins de fer, based in Rive-de-Gier. Lorette was created on 27 April 1847 in response to the development of the steelworks, particularly that of the Jackson Brothers. It includes the old quarters of the municipalities of Saint-Paul-en-Jarez, Saint-Genis-Terrenoire (now Genilac), Rive-de-Gier and Farnay.

== Churches ==
Lorette has two places of worship. Notre Dame, located in the bottom of the town, was completely renovated a few years ago. It is a very light church, since the stained glass has been replaced by large windows. Only two stained glass windows remain above the choir. Currently, it is mainly used in large masses and ceremonies. The John XXIII chapel is located on the main street of the town, just down the road. Shaped as a theater, the choir of the chapel is at the bottom of the steps in a pit. It is used every Sunday for mass.

== Population ==
Historical population

Year	Pop.	±% p.a.
1851	2,856	—
1872	4,177	+1.83%
1901	4,522	+0.27%
1926	4,573	+0.04%
1946	3,763	−0.97%
1962	4,921	+1.69%
1968	4,967	+0.16%
1975	4,589	−1.12%

Year	Pop.	±% p.a.
1982	5,094	+1.50%
1990	5,082	−0.03%
1999	4,843	−0.53%
2007	4,494	−0.93%
2012	4,653	+0.70%
2017	4,700	+0.20%
2023	4,983	+0.98%

Source: EHESS and INSEE (1968-2023)

== Personalities ==
- Étienne Rival born 15 November 1855 - Priest
- Alain Prost born 24 February 1955 at the clinique Les Berceaux - 4-time Formula One champion
- Michel Corringe died at Lorette le 2 October 2001 - Singer
- Jean Delay born at Lorette 19 October 1879 - Bishop of Marseille

== See also ==
- Communes of the Loire department
