= Jean-Louis Bonnard =

French Roman Catholic saint

Saint Jean Louis Bonnard
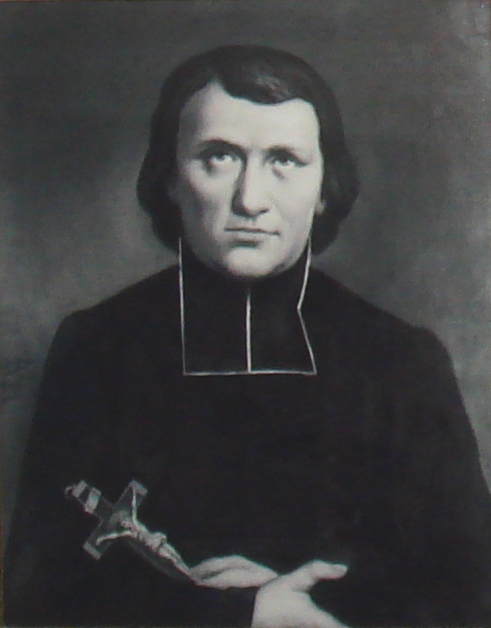
- Jean-Louis Bonnard

Martyr
- Born: 1 March 1824; Saint-Christôt-en-Jarret, France
- Died: 1 May 1852 (aged 28); Vietnam
- Canonized: 19 June 1988 by Pope John Paul II

Jean-Louis Bonnard (b. 1 March 1824 at Saint-Christôt-en-Jarret, Diocese of Lyon; beheaded 1 May 1852) was a French Roman Catholic missionary to Vietnam, one of the Martyrs of Vietnam, canonized in 1988.

== Life ==
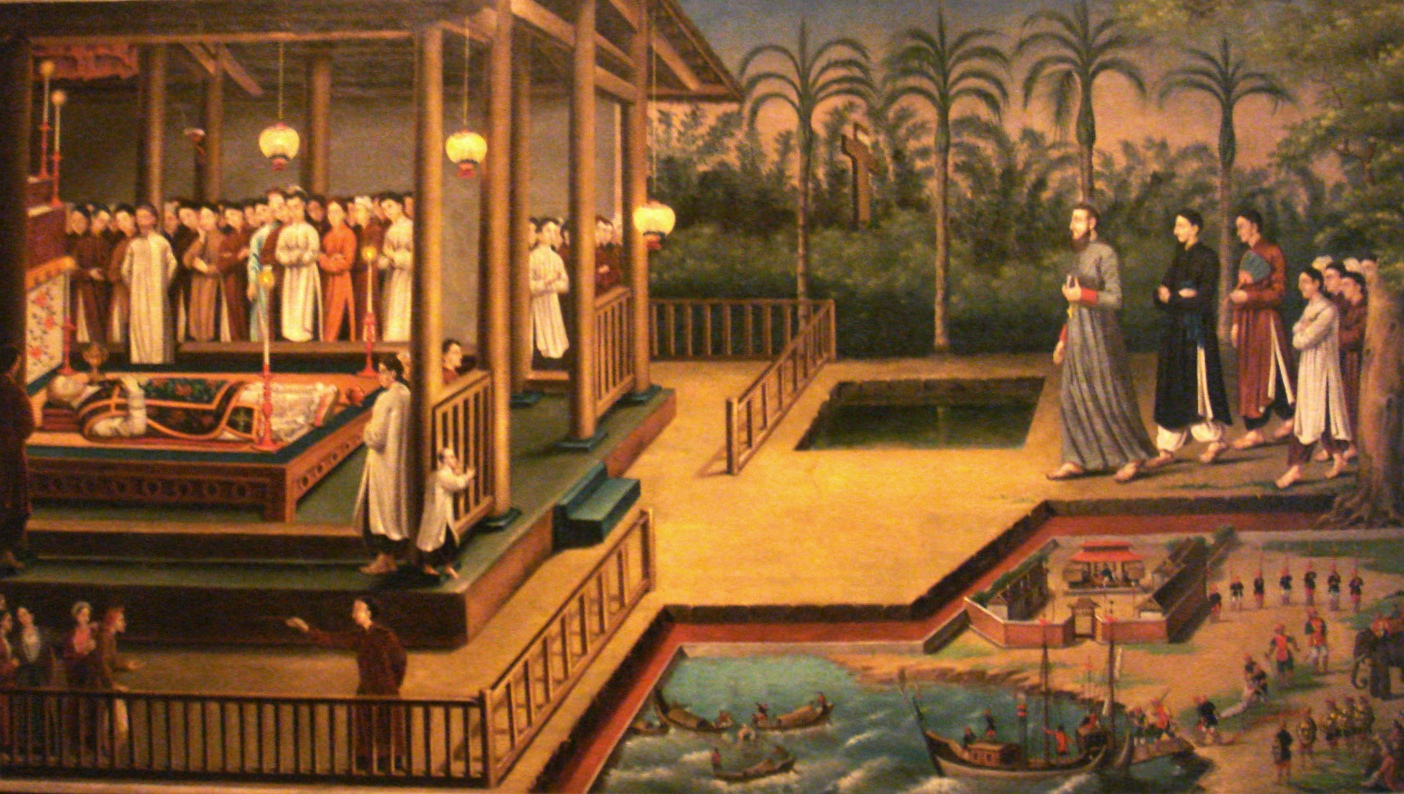
Death ceremony of Jean-Louis Bonnard. The lower right corner shows his body being cast in the water, where he was retrieved by Christians. In the upper right corner, Retord comes to the ceremony.

After a collegiate course at Saint-Jodard, he entered the seminary of Lyon. He left at the age of 22, to complete his theological studies at the Seminary of the Foreign Missions in Paris.

From Nantes, where he was ordained, he sailed for the missions of Western Tongking (northern Vietnam) and reached there in May, 1850. In 1851 he was put in charge of two parishes there. At the time, proselytisation was banned in Vietnam.

On 21 March 1852, he was arrested and cast into prison. Sentence of death was pronounced against him and was executed immediately upon receipt of its confirmation by Emperor Tự Đức (1 May 1852). His remains were thrown into the river, but recovered by Christians and sent by them to the Seminary of Foreign Missions.
