= Canton of Sorbiers =

Coordinates: 45.49°N 4.45°E

- Canton
- Situation of the canton of Sorbiers in the department of Loire
- Country: France
- Region: Auvergne-Rhône-Alpes
- Department: Loire
- No. of communes: {{{nbcomm}}}
- Population (2024): 35,219
- INSEE code: 4221

The canton of Sorbiers is an administrative division of the Loire department, in eastern France. It was created at the French canton reorganisation which came into effect in March 2015. Its seat is in Sorbiers.

== Background ==
The canton of Sorbiers was created by decree of 26 February 2014 as part of a wider redrawing of cantonal boundaries across France, which took effect at the departmental elections of March 2015. Before the reform, the Loire department was divided into 40 cantons of very uneven population, ranging from around 4,000 to 40,000 inhabitants; the reorganisation reduced this to 21 cantons, each represented by a male-female pair of conseillers départementaux elected together, and designed so that every canton's population fell within a narrower range of roughly 28,000 to 40,000 inhabitants.

The new canton of Sorbiers was formed principally from the territory of the former canton of Saint-Héand, which contributed nine of its thirteen communes, along with three communes previously belonging to the former canton of La Grand-Croix and one, Valfleury, from the former canton of Rive-de-Gier. As of 2024, the canton had a population of 35,219, placing it within the population range intended by the 2014 reform.

It consists of the following communes:

1. Cellieu
2. Chagnon
3. L'Étrat
4. Fontanès
5. La Fouillouse
6. Marcenod
7. Saint-Christo-en-Jarez
8. Saint-Héand
9. Saint-Romain-en-Jarez
10. Sorbiers
11. La Talaudière
12. La Tour-en-Jarez
13. Valfleury
