= Châteauneuf, Loire =

Châteauneuf
- Commune
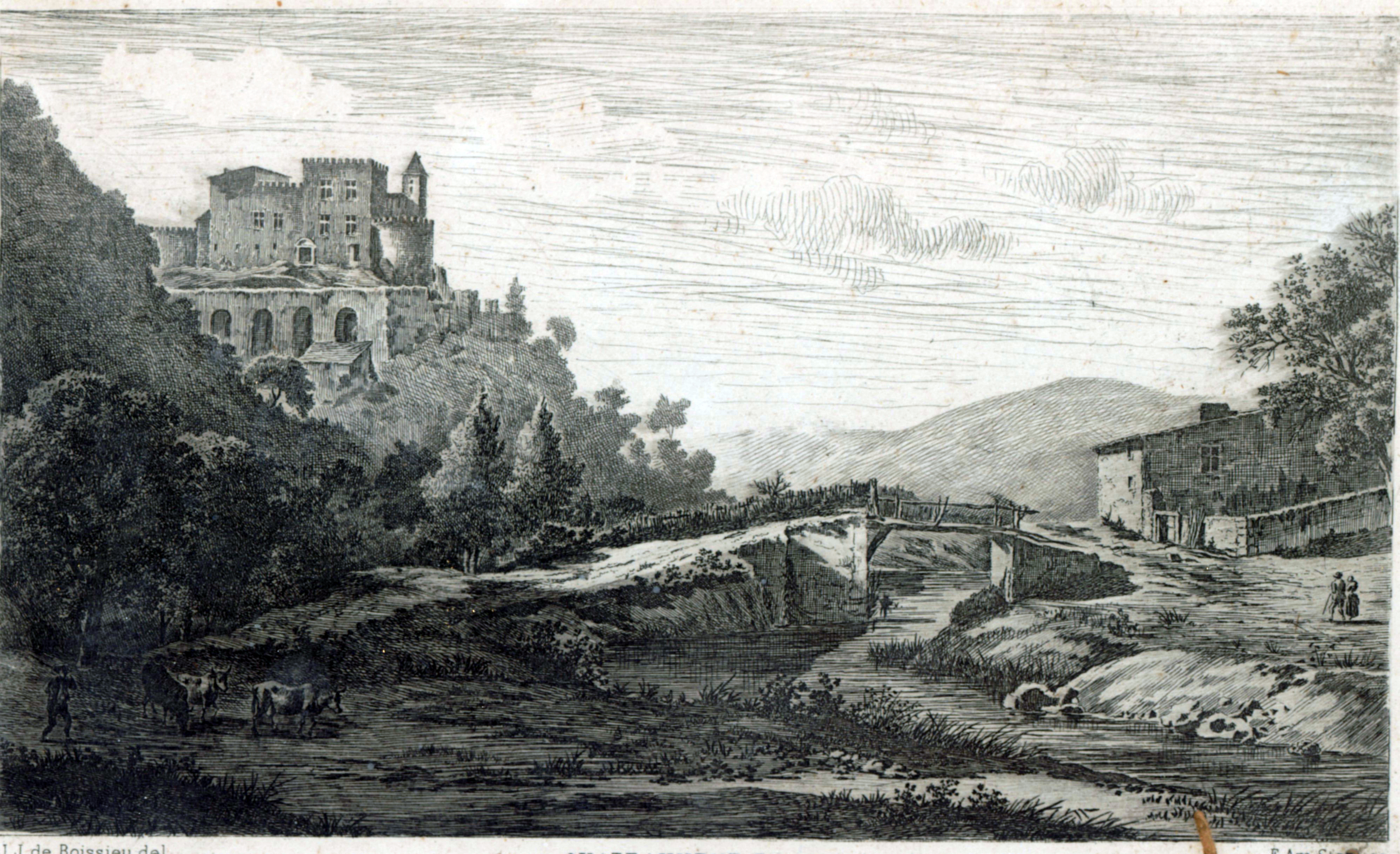
- Château in 1789
- Location of Châteauneuf
- Location within France Location within Auvergne-Rhône-Alpes
- Coordinates: 45°31′22″N 4°37′32″E
- Country: France
- Region: Auvergne-Rhône-Alpes
- Department: Loire
- Arrondissement: Saint-Étienne
- Canton: Rive-de-Gier
- Intercommunality: Saint-Étienne Métropole

Government
  - Mayor (2020–2026): Bernard Laget
- Area^{1}: 13.65 km^{2} (5.27 sq mi)
- Elevation: 230 m (750 ft)
- Highest elevation: 657 m (2,156 ft)
- Lowest elevation: 208 m (682 ft)
- Population (2023): 1,724
  - Density: 126.3/km^{2} (327.1/sq mi)
- Time zone: UTC+01:00 (CET)
  - Summer (DST): UTC+02:00 (CEST)
- INSEE/Postal code: 42053 /42800
- ^{1} French Land Register data, which excludes lakes, ponds, glaciers > 1 km^{2} (0.386 sq mi or 247 acres) and river estuaries.

Châteauneuf (French pronunciation: [ʃɑtonœf]) is a commune in the Loire department in central France, midway between Saint-Etienne and Lyon on the A-47 motorway.

Châteauneuf is home to one of the units of ArcelorMittal subsidiary Industeel France.

== Population ==
Historical population
Year	Pop.	±% p.a.
1968	776	—
1975	902	+2.17%
1982	1,173	+3.82%
1990	1,351	+1.78%
1999	1,445	+0.75%
2007	1,466	+0.18%
2012	1,518	+0.70%
2017	1,599	+1.05%
2023	1,724	+1.26%
Source: INSEE

== See also ==
- Communes of the Loire department
