= Canton of Saint-Chamond =

Coordinates: 45.47°N 4.51°E

- Canton
- Situation of the canton of Saint-Chamond in the department of Loire
- Country: France
- Region: Auvergne-Rhône-Alpes
- Department: Loire
- No. of communes: {{{nbcomm}}}
- Population (2023): 40,452
- INSEE code: 4213

The canton of Saint-Chamond is an administrative division of the Loire department, in eastern France. It was created at the French canton reorganisation which came into effect in March 2015. Its seat is in Saint-Chamond.

It consists of the following communes:

1. L'Horme
2. Saint-Chamond
