= Dargoire =

- Commune
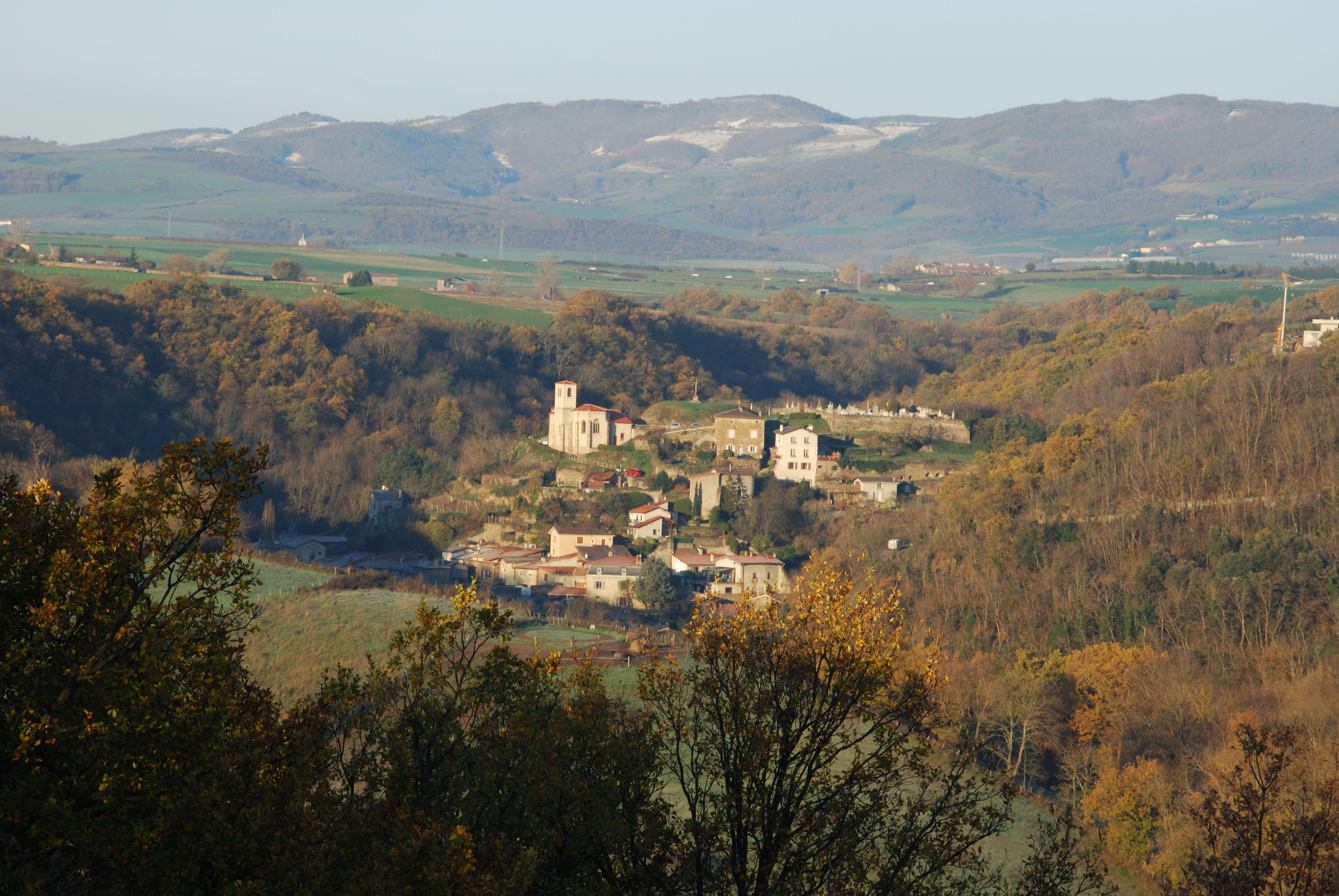

- Coat of arms
- Location of Dargoire
- Location within France Location within Auvergne-Rhône-Alpes
- Coordinates: 45°33′40″N 4°40′06″E
- Country: France
- Region: Auvergne-Rhône-Alpes
- Department: Loire
- Arrondissement: Saint-Étienne
- Canton: Rive-de-Gier
- Intercommunality: Saint-Étienne Métropole

Government
  - Mayor (2020–2026): Marc Jandot
- Area^{1}: 1.92 km^{2} (0.74 sq mi)
- Elevation: 245 m (804 ft)
- Highest elevation: 335 m (1,099 ft)
- Lowest elevation: 189 m (620 ft)
- Population (2023): 524
  - Density: 273/km^{2} (707/sq mi)
- Time zone: UTC+01:00 (CET)
  - Summer (DST): UTC+02:00 (CEST)
- INSEE/Postal code: 42083 /42800
- ^{1} French Land Register data, which excludes lakes, ponds, glaciers > 1 km^{2} (0.386 sq mi or 247 acres) and river estuaries.

Dargoire (French pronunciation: [daʁɡwaʁ]) is a commune in the Loire department in central France.

== Population ==
Historical population
Year	Pop.	±% p.a.
1968	111	—
1975	159	+5.27%
1982	289	+8.91%
1990	428	+5.03%
1999	409	−0.50%
2007	417	+0.24%
2012	478	+2.77%
2017	521	+1.74%
2023	524	+0.10%
Source: INSEE

== See also ==
- Communes of the Loire department
