= Hôtel de Ville, Givors =

Town hall in Givors, France

Hôtel de Ville
- The main frontage of the Hôtel de Ville in August 2011
- Interactive map of the Hôtel de Ville area

General information
- Type: City hall
- Architectural style: Neoclassical style
- Location: Givors, France
- Coordinates: 45.5826°N 4.7736°E
- Completed: 1860

Design and construction
- Architect: Pierre Bernard

The Hôtel de Ville (French pronunciation: [otɛl də vil], City Hall) is a municipal building in Givors, Metropolis of Lyon, in eastern France, standing on Place Camille Vallin.

== History ==
After the French Revolution, the new town council originally held their meetings in the house of the mayor at the time. In 1820, the mayor, Nicolas-Joseph-Henri Bolot, donated the land for the construction of the Church of Saint-Nicholas. Construction of the church continued for much of the next three decades but, after the French Revolution of 1848, in which the council supported the republican cause, the completed church became a municipal building and the council ordered that the republican inscription "Liberté, Égalité, Fraternité" be carved on its pediment.

In February 1855, the council led by the mayor, Édouard Glas, decided to commission a purpose-built town hall. The site they selected was on the northeastern side of the marketplace. After a series of houses had been acquired and demolished, the foundation stone for the new building was laid on 17 May 1858. It was designed by Pierre Bernard in the neoclassical style, built in ashlar stone and was officially opened in January 1860.

The design involved a symmetrical main frontage of five bays facing onto the marketplace. The central section of three bays, which incorporated an extra floor, featured three round-headed openings with moulded surrounds and keystones on the ground floor, three casement windows with triangular pediments on the first floor and by three square windows with cornices on the second floor. The bays in the central section were flanked by Ionic order columns on the ground floor, by Corinthian order columns on the first floor and by pilasters on the second floor. At roof level, there was an arch over the central bay, a balustraded parapet, and an ornate two-stage clock tower surmounted by a dome. The outer bays were fenestrated by casement windows with cornices on both floors.

During the liberation of the town on 25 August 1944, in the closing phases of the Second World War, a liberation committee was established in the town hall. However, three days later a German armed column passed through the town, and it was not until 2 September 1944 that French Forces of the Interior were able to enter the town and fully secure the building.
