= Saint-Romain-en-Jarez =

- Commune
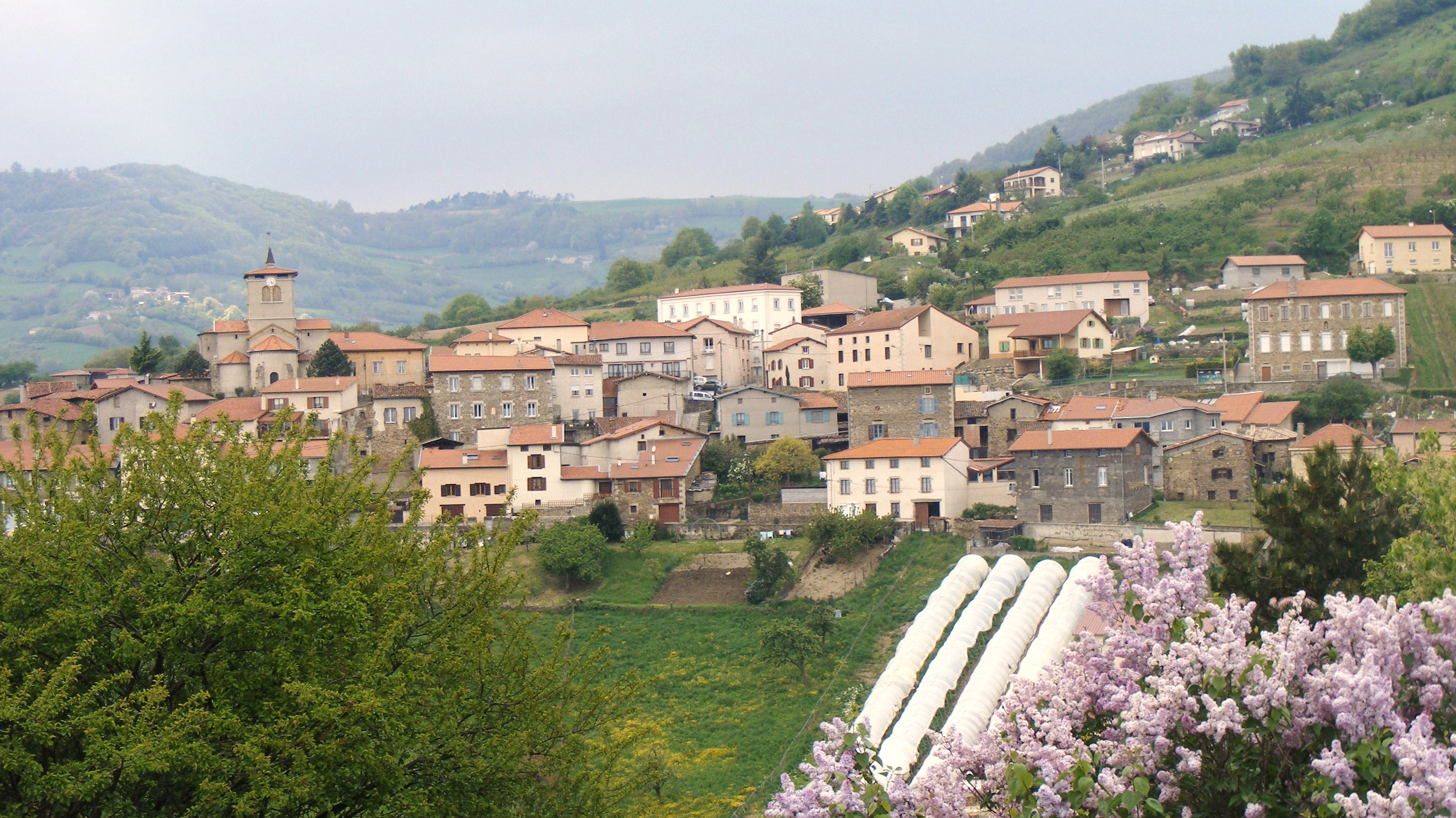

- Coat of arms
- Location of Saint-Romain-en-Jarez
- Location within France Location within Auvergne-Rhône-Alpes
- Coordinates: 45°33′25″N 4°32′06″E
- Country: France
- Region: Auvergne-Rhône-Alpes
- Department: Loire
- Arrondissement: Saint-Étienne
- Canton: Sorbiers
- Intercommunality: Saint-Étienne Métropole

Government
  - Mayor (2020–2026): Gilles Pérache
- Area^{1}: 16.96 km^{2} (6.55 sq mi)
- Highest elevation: 920 m (3,020 ft)
- Lowest elevation: 360 m (1,180 ft)
- Population (2023): 1,206
  - Density: 71.11/km^{2} (184.2/sq mi)
- Time zone: UTC+01:00 (CET)
  - Summer (DST): UTC+02:00 (CEST)
- INSEE/Postal code: 42283 /42800
- ^{1} French Land Register data, which excludes lakes, ponds, glaciers > 1 km^{2} (0.386 sq mi or 247 acres) and river estuaries.

Saint-Romain-en-Jarez (French pronunciation: [sɛ̃ ʁɔmɛ̃ ɑ̃ ʒaʁɛ]) is a commune in the Loire department in central France.

== Population ==
Historical population
Year	Pop.	±% p.a.
1968	739	—
1975	705	−0.67%
1982	767	+1.21%
1990	813	+0.73%
1999	926	+1.46%
2007	1,107	+2.26%
2012	1,192	+1.49%
2017	1,226	+0.56%
2023	1,206	−0.27%
Source: INSEE

== See also ==
- Communes of the Loire department
