= Saint-Étienne Métropole =

Coordinates: 45.4402°N 4.3987°E

- Métropole
- Location in the Loire department.

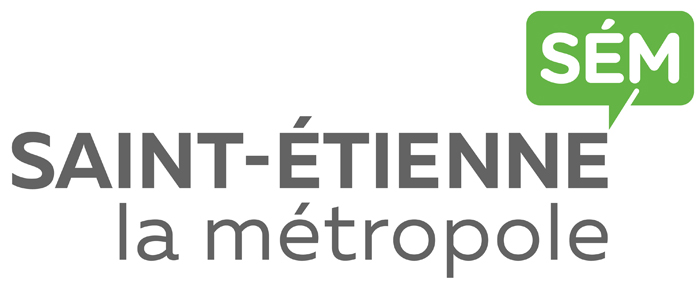
- Country: France
- Region: Auvergne-Rhône-Alpes
- Department: Loire
- No. of communes: {{{nbcomm}}}
- Established: January 1, 2018

Government
  - President: Gaël Perdriau (DVD)
- Area: 723.5 km^{2} (279.3 sq mi)
- Population (2018): 404,607
  - Density: 559.2/km^{2} (1,448/sq mi)
- Website: www.saint-etienne-metropole.fr

Saint-Étienne Métropole (French pronunciation: [sɛ̃t‿etjɛn metʁɔpɔl]) is the métropole, an intercommunal structure, centred on the city of Saint-Étienne. It is located in the Loire department, in the Auvergne-Rhône-Alpes region, central France. It was created in January 2018, replacing the previous Communauté urbaine Saint-Étienne Métropole. Its area is 723.5 km^{2}. Its population was 404,607 in 2018, of which 173,089 in Saint-Étienne proper.

== History ==
In 1995, Saint-Étienne Métropole was created as a communauté de communes, consisting of 22 communes. This was converted into a communauté d'agglomération in 2001, expanded to 43 communes in 2003 and to 45 communes in 2013. The communauté d'agglomération was converted to a communauté urbaine in January 2016. It was expanded to 53 communes in January 2017. The communauté urbaine was converted to a métropole in January 2018.

== Composition ==
The Saint-Étienne Métropole consists of the following 53 communes:

1. Aboën
2. Andrézieux-Bouthéon
3. Caloire
4. Cellieu
5. Chagnon
6. Chambœuf
7. Le Chambon-Feugerolles
8. Châteauneuf
9. Dargoire
10. Doizieux
11. L'Étrat
12. Farnay
13. Firminy
14. Fontanès
15. La Fouillouse
16. Fraisses
17. Genilac
18. La Gimond
19. La Grand-Croix
20. L'Horme
21. Lorette
22. Marcenod
23. Pavezin
24. La Ricamarie
25. Rive-de-Gier
26. Roche-la-Molière
27. Rozier-Côtes-d'Aurec
28. Saint-Bonnet-les-Oules
29. Saint-Chamond
30. Saint-Christo-en-Jarez
31. Sainte-Croix-en-Jarez
32. Saint-Étienne
33. Saint-Galmier
34. Saint-Genest-Lerpt
35. Saint-Héand
36. Saint-Jean-Bonnefonds
37. Saint-Joseph
38. Saint-Martin-la-Plaine
39. Saint-Maurice-en-Gourgois
40. Saint-Nizier-de-Fornas
41. Saint-Paul-en-Cornillon
42. Saint-Paul-en-Jarez
43. Saint-Priest-en-Jarez
44. Saint-Romain-en-Jarez
45. Sorbiers
46. La Talaudière
47. Tartaras
48. La Terrasse-sur-Dorlay
49. La Tour-en-Jarez
50. Unieux
51. Valfleury
52. La Valla-en-Gier
53. Villars

== See also ==
- Transport in Rhône-Alpes
