= Karim Kerkar =

Algerian international footballer (born 1977)

Personal information
- Date of birth: 3 January 1977 (age 49)
- Place of birth: Givors, France
- Height: 1.74 m (5 ft 9 in)
- Position: Midfielder

Senior career*
Years	Team	Apps	(Gls)
1997–1999	Gueugnon	43	(4)
1998	→ Le Havre (loan)	3	(0)
1999–2002	Le Havre	57	(3)
2002	Manchester City	0	(0)
2003–2004	Al-Sailiya		
2004	Clyde	2	(0)
2004–2005	Dundee United	10	(0)
2005	Dubai Club		
2005–2006	Emirates Club		
2006–2007	Al Dhafra FC		
2007–2008	Al-Fujairah SC		
2008–2009	Dubai Club	9	(1)
2009–2011	Emirates Club		
2011–2013	Ajman		
2013	Al-Dhaid		

International career^{‡}
1998–2004	Algeria	7	(0)
- * Club domestic league appearances and goals as of 00:00, 1 January 2011 (UTC) ‡ National team caps and goals as of 00:00, 1 January 2011 (UTC)

Karim Kerkar (born 3 January 1977) is a professional footballer who last played for Ajman Club in the UAE Football League. Born in Givors, Rhône, France, he represented Algeria at international level.

== Personal ==
Kerkar was born to a family of Algerian immigrants in the town of Givors in France. He is the older brother of Charlton Athletic midfielder Salim Kerkar and US Possession forward Farid Kerkar.

== Career ==
French-born Kerkar, who represented Algeria at international level, started his career with Gueugnon before spending three years with Le Havre. In 2002, Kerkar tried his luck with Manchester City but failed to play in a three-month spell and moved to Qatar club Al-Siliya. Kerkar came back to Britain in 2004, spending a month with Scottish side Clyde, where his performances won him a short-term move to Dundee United. At the end of 2004, Kerkar decided to pursue his career elsewhere and moved to the United Arab Emirates with Dubai Club before moving on quickly to Al-Wahda. Kerkar spent two weeks with St Mirren in September 2007 and subsequently agreed a contract, only to renege on it twenty-four hours later, causing manager Gus MacPherson to announce he was "frustrated and disappointed". MacPherson advised Kerkar had been made clear as to the club's feelings regarding the matter, with the manager's misery compounded when St Mirren were beaten 2-0 the following day by Dundee United - Kerkar's last Scottish club. Kerkar had been on trial with St Johnstone the month previously and also went back on his word to sign.

Kerkar returned to former club Dubai Club in early 2008.

On 14 June 2011 Kerkar signed a one-year contract with Ajman Club. On 16 October 2011 he made his league debut for the club, in the first week of the 2011-12 UAE Football League season.

== Honours ==
Emirates Club

- UAE President Cup: 2010
- UAE Super Cup: 2010
