= Saint-Joseph, Loire =

Saint-Joseph
- Commune
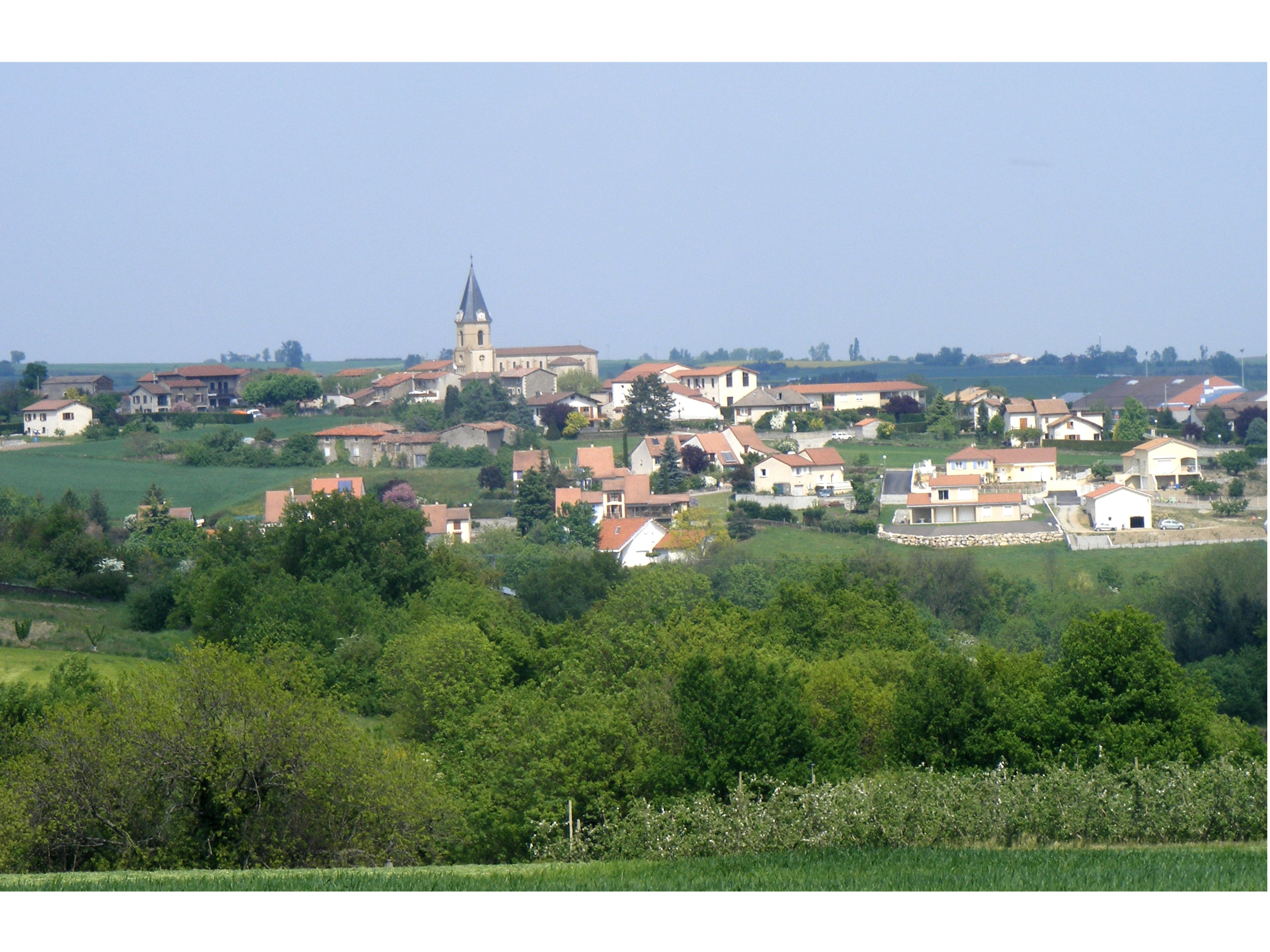
- Location of Saint-Joseph
- Location within France Location within Auvergne-Rhône-Alpes
- Coordinates: 45°33′28″N 4°37′07″E
- Country: France
- Region: Auvergne-Rhône-Alpes
- Department: Loire
- Arrondissement: Saint-Étienne
- Canton: Rive-de-Gier
- Intercommunality: Saint-Étienne Métropole

Government
  - Mayor (2020–2026): Fabrice Ducret
- Area^{1}: 8.05 km^{2} (3.11 sq mi)
- Elevation: 400 m (1,300 ft)
- Highest elevation: 497 m (1,631 ft)
- Lowest elevation: 219 m (719 ft)
- Population (2023): 1,996
  - Density: 248/km^{2} (642/sq mi)
- Time zone: UTC+01:00 (CET)
  - Summer (DST): UTC+02:00 (CEST)
- INSEE/Postal code: 42242 /42800
- ^{1} French Land Register data, which excludes lakes, ponds, glaciers > 1 km^{2} (0.386 sq mi or 247 acres) and river estuaries.

Saint-Joseph (French pronunciation: [sɛ̃ ʒozɛf]) is a commune in the Loire department in central France.

== Population ==
Historical population
Year	Pop.	±% p.a.
1968	1,147	—
1975	1,144	−0.04%
1982	1,200	+0.69%
1990	1,414	+2.07%
1999	1,623	+1.54%
2007	1,809	+1.37%
2012	1,919	+1.19%
2017	1,901	−0.19%
2023	1,996	+0.82%
Source: INSEE

== See also ==
- Communes of the Loire department
