= Salim Kerkar =

French footballer (born 1987)

Personal information
- Full name: Salim Kerkar
- Date of birth: 4 August 1987 (age 39)
- Place of birth: Givors, France
- Height: 1.83 m (6 ft 0 in)
- Positions: Attacking midfielder; winger

Team information
- Current team: Burgan SC

Youth career
- Gueugnon

Senior career*
Years	Team	Apps	(Gls)
2006–2010	Gueugnon	48	(4)
2007–2008	→ Calais (loan)	36	(6)
2010–2012	Rangers	18	(2)
2012–2013	Charlton Athletic	24	(1)
2014–2016	Beroe	46	(7)
2016–2017	Vereya	30	(2)
2018	Burgan SC	0	(0)
- * Club domestic league appearances and goals as of 11 December 2017

Salim Kerkar (born 4 August 1987) is a French footballer who plays for Kuwaiti Division One club Burgan SC. Kerkar has previously played for Gueugnon, Calais, Rangers, Charlton Athletic, Beroe Stara Zagora and Vereya.

== Club career ==
On 8 September 2006, Kerkar made his professional debut, starting for FC Gueugnon in a Ligue 2 game against Tours FC. On 5 May 2007, he signed his first professional contract with Gueugnon.

On 17 August 2010, Kerkar went on trial with Scottish Premier League side Rangers, scoring a goal in a 5–0 friendly over Partick Thistle. On 28 October, Rangers boss Walter Smith announced that Kerkar was no longer a target as his old club FC Gueugnon were demanding up to €360,000 compensation. FC Gueugnon then retracted their demand for compensation and instead opted for a sell-on clause, allowing Kerkar to sign for the Ibrox club. He made his debut as a substitute in the 5–0 win against Motherwell at Fir Park on 30 April 2011. He scored his first goal for Rangers in the Scottish Cup against Arbroath on 8 January 2012, celebrating with a flute playing imitation in the mould of Gazza.

On 18 July 2012, Kerkar went on trial with English Championship side Charlton. He signed for Charlton on 1 August 2012. He was released by Charlton at the end of the 2012–13 season.

After seven months without club, Kerkar signed with Bulgarian side Beroe Stara Zagora on 13 February 2014.

On 20 October 2016, following a trial period, Kerkar signed a one-year contract with the other club from Stara Zagora Vereya.

== International career ==
Kerkar holds both French and Algerian nationalities. In 2014, Algeria's manager Christian Gourcuff announced that he wanted Salim to play for Algeria.

== Personal life ==
Kerkar is the younger brother of former Algerian international footballer Karim Kerkar.

== Honours ==
Rangers

- Scottish Premier League (1): 2010–11
- Scottish League Cup (1): 2011
