= La Talaudière =

- Commune
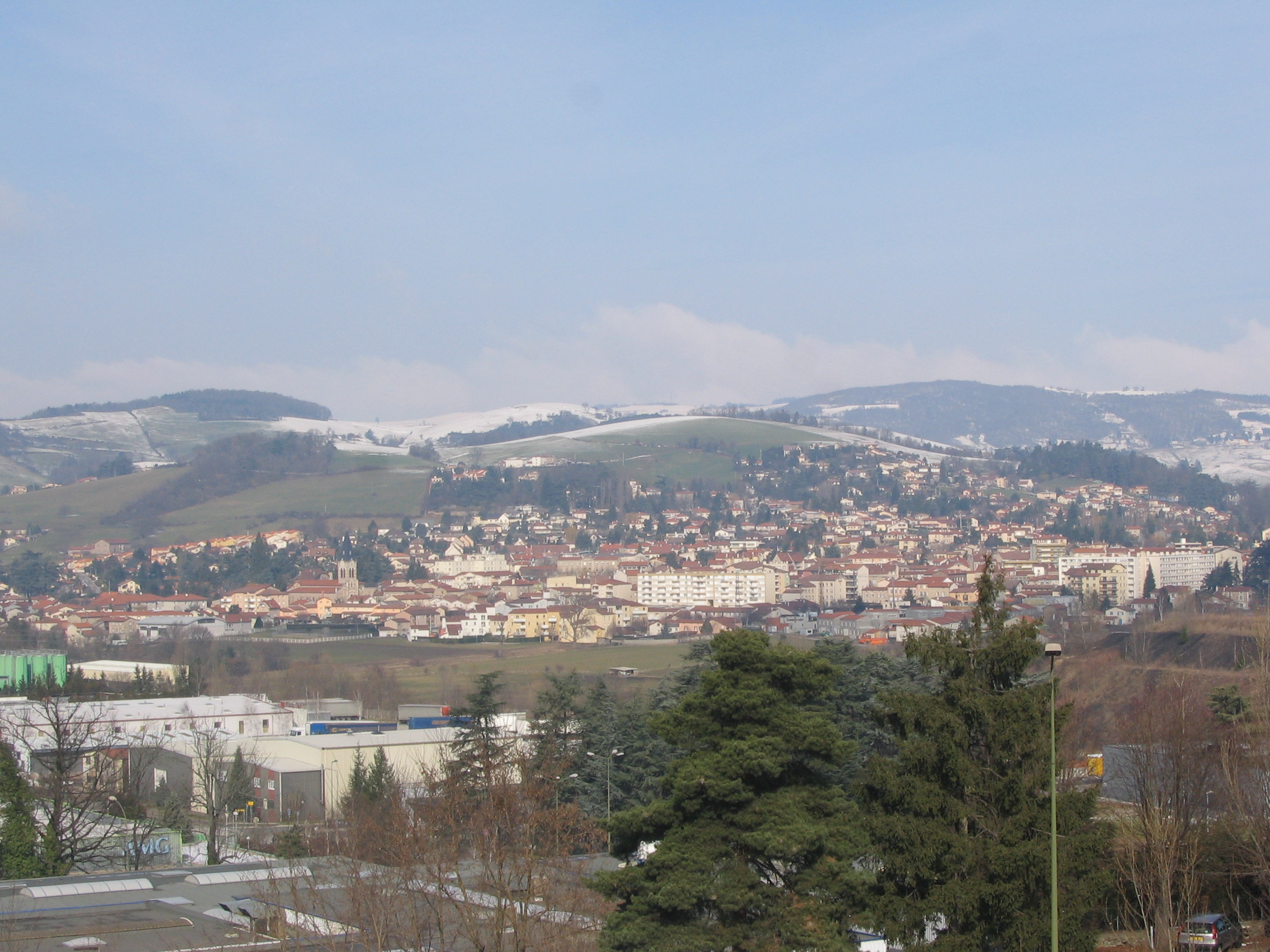
- Location of La Talaudière
- Location within France Location within Auvergne-Rhône-Alpes
- Coordinates: 45°28′57″N 4°25′58″E
- Country: France
- Region: Auvergne-Rhône-Alpes
- Department: Loire
- Arrondissement: Saint-Étienne
- Canton: Sorbiers
- Intercommunality: Saint-Étienne Métropole

Government
  - Mayor (2020–2026): Ramona Gonzalez-Grail
- Area^{1}: 7.63 km^{2} (2.95 sq mi)
- Elevation: 507 m (1,663 ft)
- Highest elevation: 696 m (2,283 ft)
- Lowest elevation: 473 m (1,552 ft)
- Population (2023): 7,133
  - Density: 935/km^{2} (2,420/sq mi)
- Time zone: UTC+01:00 (CET)
  - Summer (DST): UTC+02:00 (CEST)
- INSEE/Postal code: 42305 /42350
- ^{1} French Land Register data, which excludes lakes, ponds, glaciers > 1 km^{2} (0.386 sq mi or 247 acres) and river estuaries.

La Talaudière (French pronunciation: [la talodjɛʁ]) is a commune in the Loire department in central France.

== Population ==
Historical population

Year	Pop.	±% p.a.
1872	2,469	—
1876	2,676	+2.03%
1881	3,046	+2.62%
1886	3,045	−0.01%
1891	3,246	+1.29%
1896	3,327	+0.49%
1901	3,178	−0.91%
1906	3,260	+0.51%
1911	3,437	+1.06%
1921	3,413	−0.07%
1926	3,543	+0.75%
1931	3,410	−0.76%
1936	3,627	+1.24%

Year	Pop.	±% p.a.
1946	3,774	+0.40%
1954	4,302	+1.65%
1962	4,309	+0.02%
1968	4,808	+1.84%
1975	5,655	+2.35%
1982	5,577	−0.20%
1990	5,935	+0.78%
1999	6,700	+1.36%
2007	6,377	−0.62%
2012	6,496	+0.37%
2017	6,860	+1.10%
2023	7,133	+0.65%

Source: EHESS and INSEE (1968-2023)

== Twin towns ==
La Talaudière is twinned with:

- Sio, Mali
- Küssaberg, Germany

== See also ==
- Communes of the Loire department
