= Givors =

- Commune
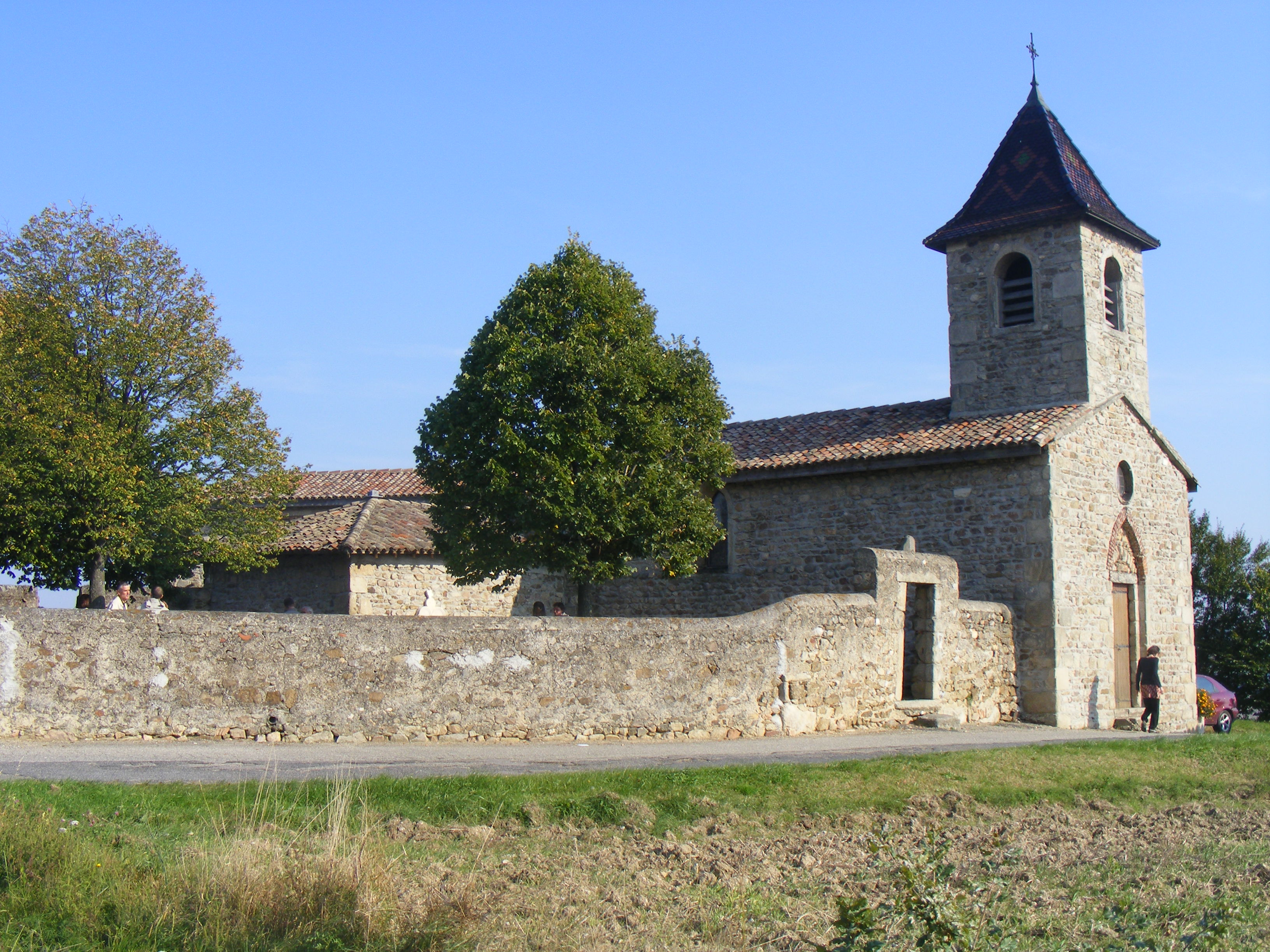
- Saint Lazare Church in the hamlet of Saint-Martin-de-Cornas, part of Givors

- Coat of arms
- Location of Givors
- Location within France Location within Auvergne-Rhône-Alpes
- Coordinates: 45°35′29″N 4°46′10″E
- Country: France
- Region: Auvergne-Rhône-Alpes
- Metropolis: Lyon Metropolis
- Arrondissement: Lyon

Government
  - Mayor (2021–2026): Mohamed Boudjellaba
- Area^{1}: 17.34 km^{2} (6.70 sq mi)
- Elevation: 162 m (531 ft)
- Highest elevation: 373 m (1,224 ft)
- Lowest elevation: 145 m (476 ft)
- Population (2023): 21,379
  - Density: 1,233/km^{2} (3,193/sq mi)
- Time zone: UTC+01:00 (CET)
  - Summer (DST): UTC+02:00 (CEST)
- INSEE/Postal code: 69091 /69700
- Website: Official website
- ^{1} French Land Register data, which excludes lakes, ponds, glaciers > 1 km^{2} (0.386 sq mi or 247 acres) and river estuaries.

Givors (French pronunciation: [ʒivɔʁ]; Arpitan: Givôrs) is a commune in the Metropolis of Lyon in Auvergne-Rhône-Alpes region in eastern France.

== Location ==
It lies at the confluence of the Rhone and the Gier about 25 km (16 mi) south of Lyon and on the main road between that city and Saint-Étienne. It lies between the Monts du Lyonnais to the north and west and the foothills of Mont Pilat to the south and west. The city has long served as a crossroads between the communities of the Rhône and those of the Loire. The A47 autoroute runs through the heart of Givors connecting it to Saint-Étienne, Lyon and Vienne. Givors is also a northern gateway to the Pilat Regional Natural Park.

== History ==
=== Early years ===
Before Roman times the Segusiavi occupied the territory where the present city of Givors is found. The fishing community lay on the Roman Via Aquitania. The Tour de Varissan was a Roman post of some importance.

In 1032 the province came under rule of the emperor Conrad II, Holy Roman Emperor, and was German until 1157, when Frederick Barbarossa officially recognizes that the province belonged to the Kingdom of France. In the 12th century the current city of Givors came into the possession of the Archbishop of Lyon, who was both temporal and spiritual leader of the region. In 1208 the archbishop of Lyon, Renaud de Forez, decided to build a stone castle halfway up the Saint Gerald hill. The Castle of Saint Gerald was the residence of the canons representing the archbishop in Givors. The castle was destroyed in 1591 when Givors was stormed by the troops of Lesdiguières, and was never rebuilt. Today, the ruins of the castle of Saint-Gerald may still be detected.

From the 17th to the 19th century the city was noted for the presence of corporations of watermen for whom the church of Saint-Nicolas was the religious center. The second church of Saint Nicholas was built in 1646 to replace the chapel that the sailors had formerly dedicated to Saint Nicholas, patron of the inland waterways.

=== Industrial growth and decline ===
The Hôtel de Ville

Coal mining increased significantly in the 18th century, so much that it was carried on mules to Lyon and Vienna. On 10 May 1749 King Louis XV authorised Sieurs Esnard and Robichon to build a glass works at Givors with furnaces heated by coal from Rive-de-Gier. Until then these glass makers had operated in Franche-Comté and in Alsace, but were experiencing a shortage of wood for fuel. Givors became well known as a glass making center during the later part of the 18th century.

On 6 September 1761 the brothers François and Guillaume Zaccharie were granted letters patent to build the Givors canal between Givors and Rive-de-Gier to carry coal and other goods (originally planned to continue on to the Loire). After many difficulties, the canal was opened in 1781. Construction of the Saint-Étienne–Lyon railway began in September 1826, the first in France. The section from Givors to Rive-de-Gier was opened for freight on 28 June 1830, with wagons initially pulled by horses. The full length from Saint-Étienne to Lyon was open by 4 April 1833.

With the construction of the canal and, subsequently, of the railway in the Gier valley, the city became a center of metallurgical industry from the middle of the 19th century. The new pottery works were recognized throughout Europe. Other industries included brick and tile works, a light bulb factory and a manufacturer of children's pedal carts and prams. Workers gradually demanded better conditions. The city supported the Revolution of 1848. The Hôtel de Ville was completed in 1860.

Strikes grew more common by the end of the Second Empire in 1870. There were major strikes in March and April 1870 that affected all corporations of the city. The city remained industrial with periodic strikes until the 1960s, when factories began closing. The glassworks closed in 2003. Today there is little industry and Givors is a dormitory town for Lyon. As of 2009, the former glassworkers were granted national media coverage around their struggle over occupational diseases.

On 1 January 1965 Givors was merged with Saint-Martin-de-Cornas.

Givors became of a member of the Urban Community of Lyon in 2007. On 1 January 2015 Givors left the department of Rhône to join the Metropolis of Lyon.

== Population ==
Historical population
Year	Pop.	±% p.a.
1968	19,048	—
1975	21,968	+2.06%
1982	20,544	−0.95%
1990	19,777	−0.47%
1999	18,437	−0.78%
2007	19,345	+0.60%
2012	19,419	+0.08%
2017	19,975	+0.57%
2023	21,379	+1.14%
Source: INSEE

== People ==
=== Algerian community ===
A significant proportion of Givors' population is of Algerian descent. This includes Algerian international footballers Khaled Lemmouchia and Karim Kerkar, judoka Djamel Bouras, who won a gold medal in the 1996 Olympic Games in Atlanta, and professional footballer Salim Kerkar.

=== Famous people ===
- Étienne Blanc - politician
- Jean-François Bony - artist
- Djamel Bouras - Olympic gold medalist judoka
- Sylvain Marconnet - professional rugby union player
- Karim Kerkar - professional football player
- Salim Kerkar - professional football player
- Khaled Lemmouchia - professional football player
- Anthony Lopes - professional football player
- Pascal Papé - professional rugby union player
- Georges Le Rider - historian and librarian, died in Givors

== Twin towns ==
- Aïn Bénian, Algeria
- Döbeln, Germany
- Novopolotsk, Belarus
- Alacuás, Spain
- Orvieto, Italy
- Gavinané, Mali
- Vila Nova de Famalicão, Portugal
