= La Fouillouse =

- Commune
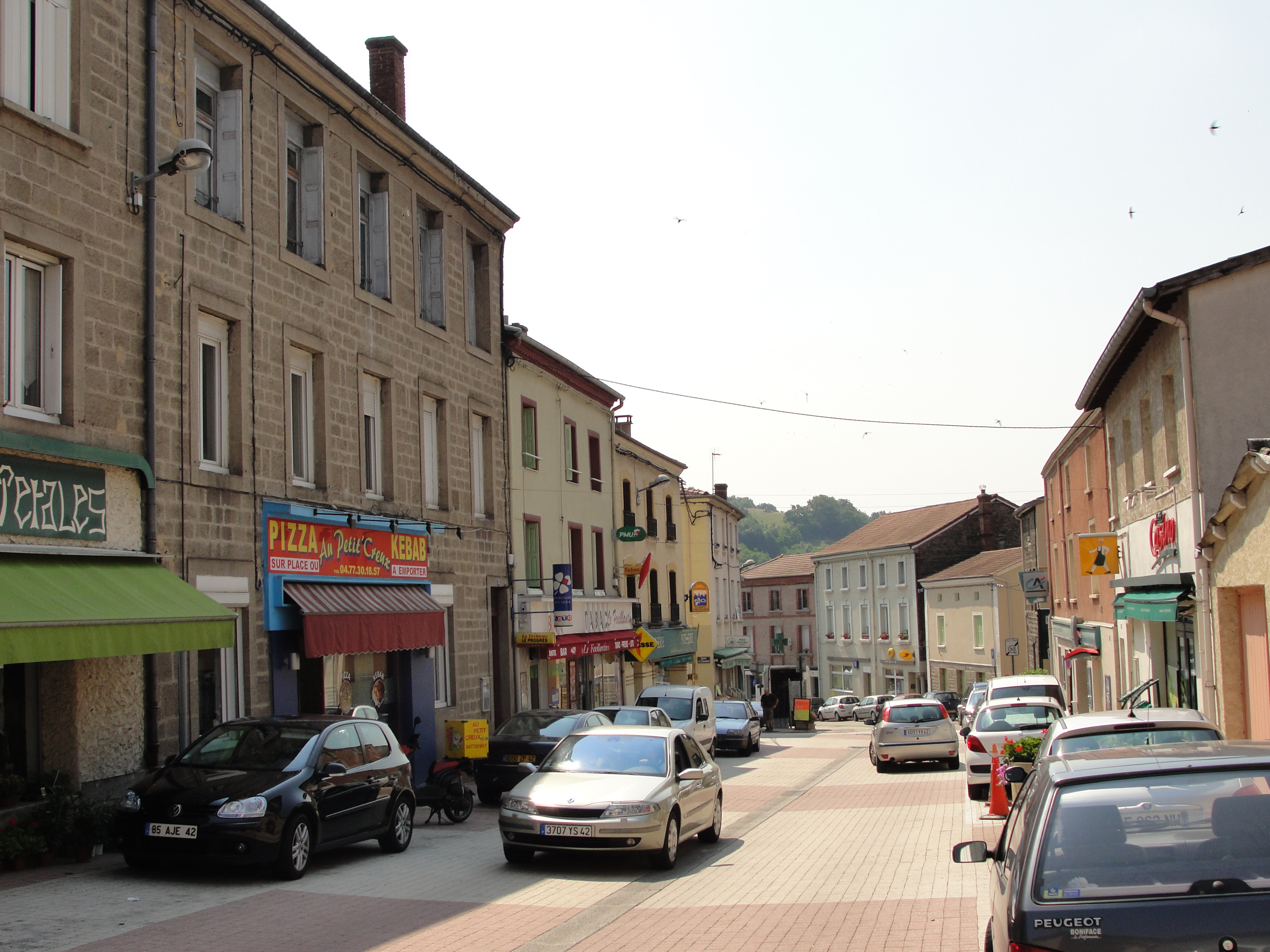
- Location of La Fouillouse
- Location within France Location within Auvergne-Rhône-Alpes
- Coordinates: 45°30′16″N 4°18′52″E
- Country: France
- Region: Auvergne-Rhône-Alpes
- Department: Loire
- Arrondissement: Saint-Étienne
- Canton: Sorbiers
- Intercommunality: Saint-Étienne Métropole

Government
  - Mayor (2020–2026): Patrick Bouchet
- Area^{1}: 20.57 km^{2} (7.94 sq mi)
- Elevation: 419 m (1,375 ft)
- Highest elevation: 628 m (2,060 ft)
- Lowest elevation: 387 m (1,270 ft)
- Population (2023): 4,630
  - Density: 225/km^{2} (583/sq mi)
- Time zone: UTC+01:00 (CET)
  - Summer (DST): UTC+02:00 (CEST)
- INSEE/Postal code: 42097 /42480
- ^{1} French Land Register data, which excludes lakes, ponds, glaciers > 1 km^{2} (0.386 sq mi or 247 acres) and river estuaries.

La Fouillouse (French pronunciation: [la fujuz]) is a commune in the Loire department in central France.

== Population ==
Historical population

Year	Pop.	±% p.a.
1793	1,392	—
1821	1,613	+0.53%
1846	2,029	+0.92%
1872	1,719	−0.64%
1901	2,173	+0.81%
1926	2,144	−0.05%
1946	2,251	+0.24%
1962	2,502	+0.66%
1968	2,736	+1.50%

Year	Pop.	±% p.a.
1975	3,352	+2.94%
1982	4,004	+2.57%
1990	4,035	+0.10%
1999	4,234	+0.54%
2007	4,326	+0.27%
2012	4,314	−0.06%
2017	4,501	+0.85%
2023	4,630	+0.47%

Source: EHESS and INSEE (1968-2023)

== See also ==
- Communes of the Loire department
