= La Tour-en-Jarez =

- Commune
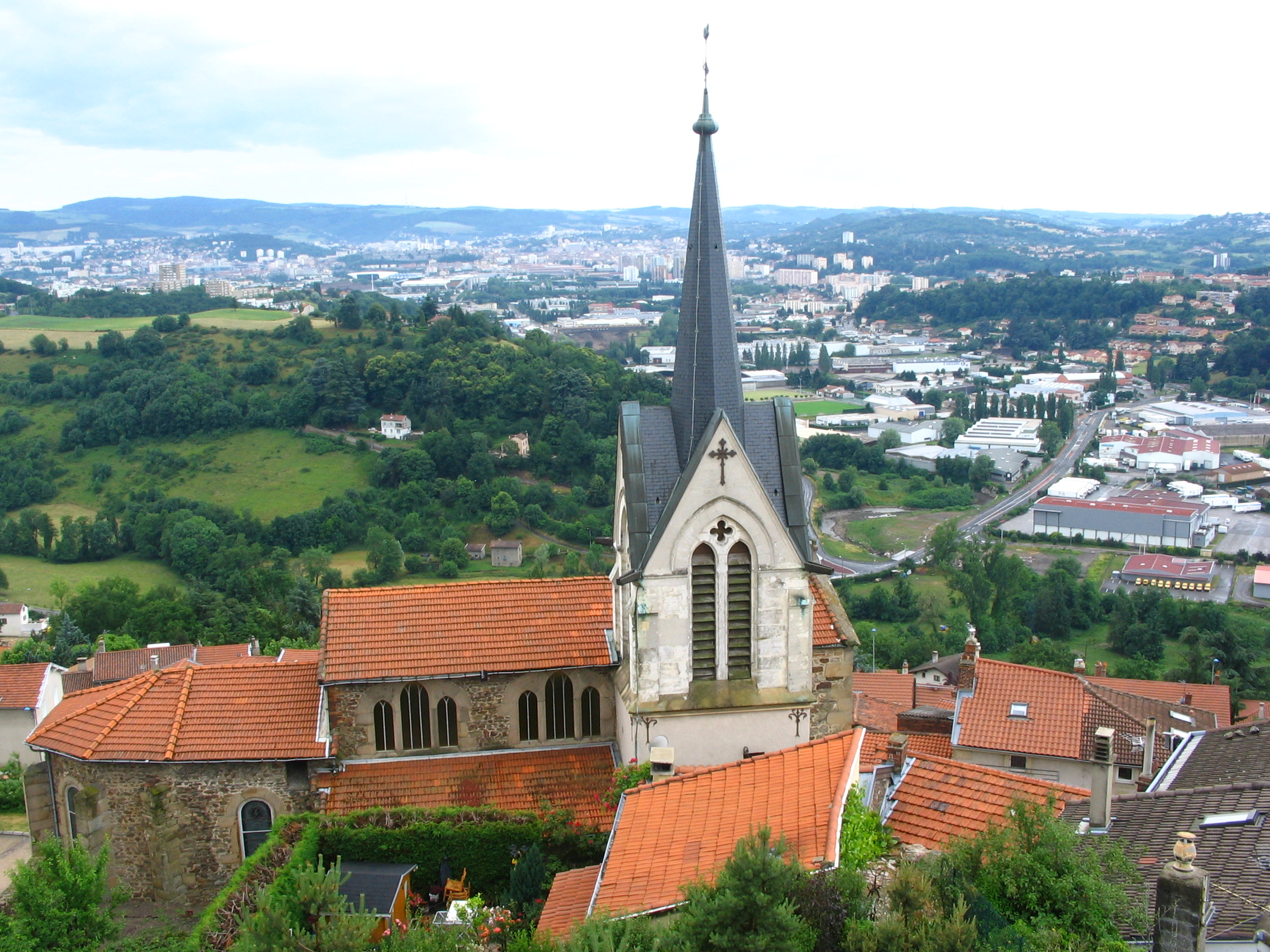
- Location of La Tour-en-Jarez
- Location within France Location within Auvergne-Rhône-Alpes
- Coordinates: 45°29′09″N 4°23′21″E
- Country: France
- Region: Auvergne-Rhône-Alpes
- Department: Loire
- Arrondissement: Saint-Étienne
- Canton: Sorbiers
- Intercommunality: Saint-Étienne Métropole

Government
  - Mayor (2020–2026): Jean-Luc Basson
- Area^{1}: 5.05 km^{2} (1.95 sq mi)
- Elevation: 540 m (1,770 ft)
- Highest elevation: 698 m (2,290 ft)
- Lowest elevation: 453 m (1,486 ft)
- Population (2023): 1,495
  - Density: 296/km^{2} (767/sq mi)
- Time zone: UTC+01:00 (CET)
  - Summer (DST): UTC+02:00 (CEST)
- INSEE/Postal code: 42311 /42580
- ^{1} French Land Register data, which excludes lakes, ponds, glaciers > 1 km^{2} (0.386 sq mi or 247 acres) and river estuaries.

La Tour-en-Jarez (French pronunciation: [la tuʁ ɑ̃ ʒaʁɛ]) is a commune in the Loire department in central France. It ceded part of its territory to the new commune of L'Étrat in 1884.

== Population ==
Historical population

Year	Pop.	±% p.a.
1793	664	—
1821	776	+0.56%
1846	870	+0.46%
1872	1,391	+1.82%
1901	504	−3.44%
1926	525	+0.16%
1946	518	−0.07%
1962	610	+1.03%
1968	639	+0.78%

Year	Pop.	±% p.a.
1975	883	+4.73%
1982	1,042	+2.39%
1990	1,123	+0.94%
1999	1,163	+0.39%
2007	1,242	+0.82%
2012	1,462	+3.32%
2017	1,479	+0.23%
2023	1,495	+0.18%

Source: EHESS and INSEE (1968-2023)

== Twin towns ==
La Tour-en-Jarez is twinned with:

- Vörstetten, Germany

== See also ==
- Communes of the Loire department
