= Saint-Héand =

- Commune
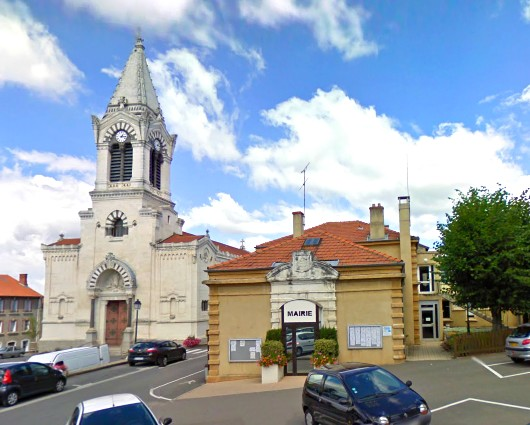
- Church and town hall

- Coat of arms
- Location of Saint-Héand
- Location within France Location within Auvergne-Rhône-Alpes
- Coordinates: 45°31′46″N 4°22′25″E
- Country: France
- Region: Auvergne-Rhône-Alpes
- Department: Loire
- Arrondissement: Saint-Étienne
- Canton: Sorbiers
- Intercommunality: Saint-Étienne Métropole

Government
  - Mayor (2022–2026): Jean-Claude Crapart
- Area^{1}: 31.3 km^{2} (12.1 sq mi)
- Elevation: 680 m (2,230 ft)
- Highest elevation: 870 m (2,850 ft)
- Lowest elevation: 467 m (1,532 ft)
- Population (2023): 3,665
  - Density: 117/km^{2} (303/sq mi)
- Time zone: UTC+01:00 (CET)
  - Summer (DST): UTC+02:00 (CEST)
- INSEE/Postal code: 42234 /42570
- ^{1} French Land Register data, which excludes lakes, ponds, glaciers > 1 km^{2} (0.386 sq mi or 247 acres) and river estuaries.

Saint-Héand (French pronunciation: [sɛ̃.t‿eɑ̃]) is a commune in the Loire department in central France, 12 kilometres from Saint-Étienne.

The name Héand comes from the Latin Eugendus; and was given to the town either by the saint himself when founding a monastery, or by pilgrims bringing relics there.

== Population ==
Historical population

Year	Pop.	±% p.a.
1793	2,639	—
1821	2,971	+0.42%
1846	3,510	+0.67%
1872	2,872	−0.77%
1901	2,671	−0.25%
1926	2,141	−0.88%
1946	1,951	−0.46%
1962	2,317	+1.08%
1968	2,549	+1.60%

Year	Pop.	±% p.a.
1975	2,980	+2.26%
1982	3,458	+2.15%
1990	3,625	+0.59%
1999	3,722	+0.29%
2007	3,729	+0.02%
2012	3,535	−1.06%
2017	3,592	+0.32%
2023	3,665	+0.34%

Source: EHESS and INSEE (1968-2023)

== Twin towns ==
Saint-Héand is twinned with Ingelfingen, Germany, since 1991.

== See also ==
- Communes of the Loire department
