= Marcenod =

- Commune
- Location of Marcenod
- Location within France Location within Auvergne-Rhône-Alpes
- Coordinates: 45°34′22″N 4°28′58″E
- Country: France
- Region: Auvergne-Rhône-Alpes
- Department: Loire
- Arrondissement: Saint-Étienne
- Canton: Sorbiers
- Intercommunality: Saint-Étienne Métropole

Government
  - Mayor (2020–2026): Gilles Thizy
- Area^{1}: 9 km^{2} (3.5 sq mi)
- Elevation: 760 m (2,490 ft)
- Highest elevation: 946 m (3,104 ft)
- Lowest elevation: 655 m (2,149 ft)
- Population (2023): 698
  - Density: 78/km^{2} (200/sq mi)
- Time zone: UTC+01:00 (CET)
  - Summer (DST): UTC+02:00 (CEST)
- INSEE/Postal code: 42133 /42140
- ^{1} French Land Register data, which excludes lakes, ponds, glaciers > 1 km^{2} (0.386 sq mi or 247 acres) and river estuaries.

Marcenod (French pronunciation: [maʁsəno]) is a commune in the Loire department in central France.

== Population ==
Historical population
Year	Pop.	±% p.a.
1968	453	—
1975	440	−0.42%
1982	422	−0.59%
1990	410	−0.36%
1999	515	+2.57%
2007	613	+2.20%
2012	680	+2.10%
2017	710	+0.87%
2023	698	−0.28%
Source: INSEE

== See also ==
- Communes of the Loire department
