= Fontanès, Loire =

Fontanès
- Commune
- Location of Fontanès
- Location within France Location within Auvergne-Rhône-Alpes
- Coordinates: 45°32′51″N 4°26′15″E
- Country: France
- Region: Auvergne-Rhône-Alpes
- Department: Loire
- Arrondissement: Saint-Étienne
- Canton: Sorbiers
- Intercommunality: Saint-Étienne Métropole

Government
  - Mayor (2020–2026): Michel Gandilhon
- Area^{1}: 6.63 km^{2} (2.56 sq mi)
- Elevation: 810 m (2,660 ft)
- Highest elevation: 900 m (3,000 ft)
- Lowest elevation: 633 m (2,077 ft)
- Population (2023): 690
  - Density: 100/km^{2} (270/sq mi)
- Time zone: UTC+01:00 (CET)
  - Summer (DST): UTC+02:00 (CEST)
- INSEE/Postal code: 42096 /42140
- ^{1} French Land Register data, which excludes lakes, ponds, glaciers > 1 km^{2} (0.386 sq mi or 247 acres) and river estuaries.

Fontanès (French pronunciation: [fɔ̃tanɛs]) is a commune in the Loire department in central France.

== Population ==
Historical population
Year	Pop.	±% p.a.
1968	449	—
1975	423	−0.85%
1982	461	+1.24%
1990	525	+1.64%
1999	576	+1.04%
2007	619	+0.90%
2012	658	+1.23%
2017	678	+0.60%
2023	690	+0.29%
Source: INSEE

== See also ==
- Communes of the Loire department
