= Chagnon =

- Commune
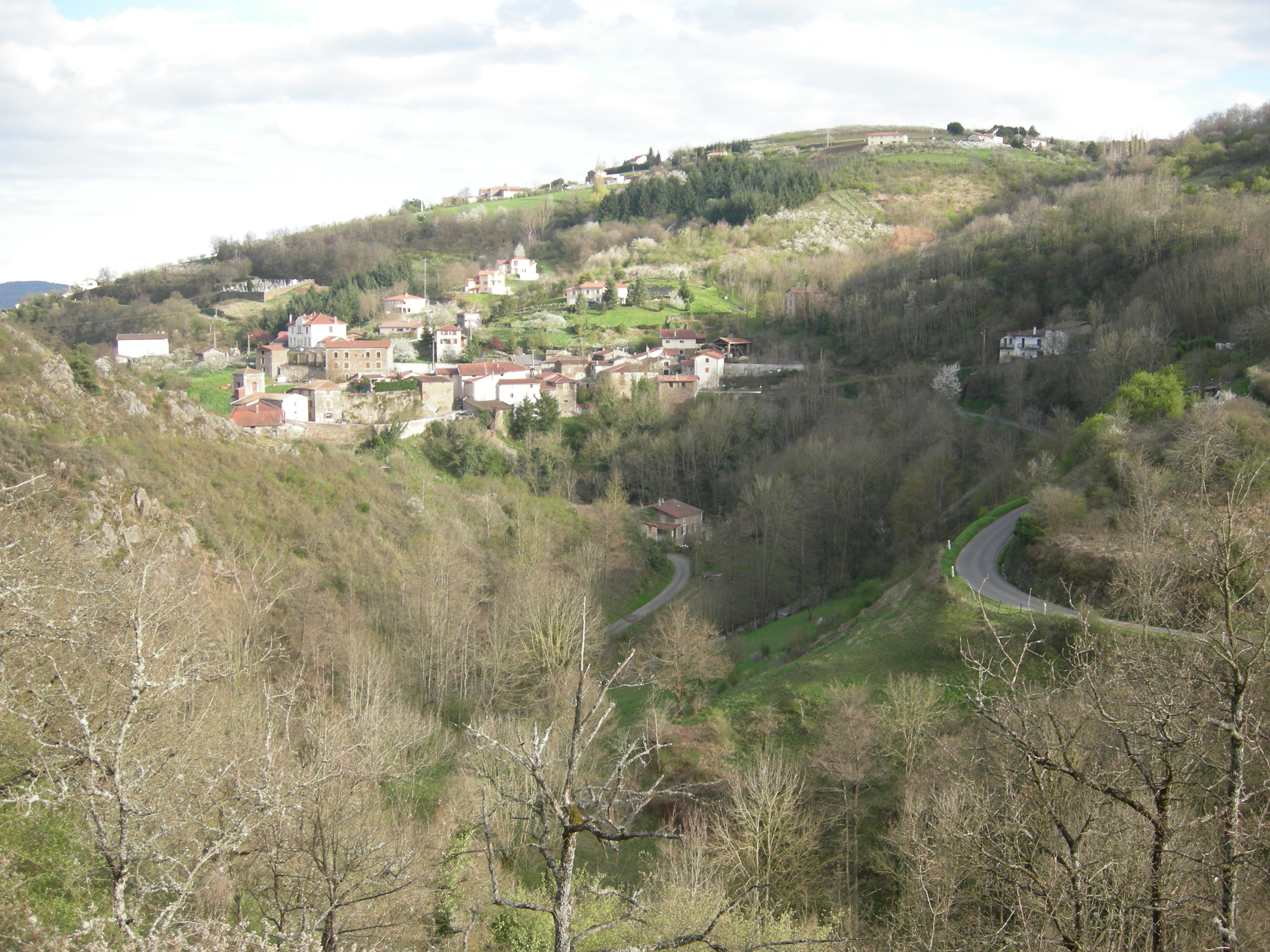
- Location of Chagnon
- Location within France Location within Auvergne-Rhône-Alpes
- Coordinates: 45°32′08″N 4°33′14″E
- Country: France
- Region: Auvergne-Rhône-Alpes
- Department: Loire
- Arrondissement: Saint-Étienne
- Canton: Sorbiers
- Intercommunality: Saint-Étienne Métropole

Government
  - Mayor (2020–2026): Frédérique Chave
- Area^{1}: 2.48 km^{2} (0.96 sq mi)
- Elevation: 310 m (1,020 ft)
- Highest elevation: 518 m (1,699 ft)
- Lowest elevation: 300 m (980 ft)
- Population (2023): 527
  - Density: 212/km^{2} (550/sq mi)
- Time zone: UTC+01:00 (CET)
  - Summer (DST): UTC+02:00 (CEST)
- INSEE/Postal code: 42036 /42800
- ^{1} French Land Register data, which excludes lakes, ponds, glaciers > 1 km^{2} (0.386 sq mi or 247 acres) and river estuaries.

Chagnon (French pronunciation: [ʃaɲɔ̃]) is a commune in the Loire department in central France.

== Population ==
Historical population
| Year | Pop. | ±% p.a. |
|---|---|---|
| 1968 | 253 | — |
| 1975 | 231 | −1.29% |
| 1982 | 285 | +3.05% |
| 1990 | 313 | +1.18% |
| 1999 | 411 | +3.07% |
| 2007 | 511 | +2.76% |
| 2012 | 497 | −0.55% |
| 2017 | 490 | −0.28% |
| 2023 | 527 | +1.22% |
Source: INSEE

== See also ==
- Communes of the Loire department
