= Canton of Rive-de-Gier =

Coordinates: 45.5301°N 4.6233°E

Rive-de-Gier
- Canton
- Country: France
- Region: Auvergne-Rhône-Alpes
- Department: Loire
- No. of communes: {{{nbcomm}}}
- Area: 88.60 km^{2} (34.21 sq mi)
- Population (2023): 44,031
  - Density: 497.0/km^{2} (1,287/sq mi)
- INSEE code: 42 10

The canton of Rive-de-Gier is a French administrative division located in the department of Loire and the Auvergne-Rhône-Alpes region. At the French canton reorganisation which came into effect in March 2015, the canton was expanded from 10 to 11 communes:

- Châteauneuf
- Dargoire
- Farnay
- La Grand-Croix
- Lorette
- Genilac
- Rive-de-Gier
- Saint-Joseph
- Saint-Martin-la-Plaine
- Saint-Paul-en-Jarez
- Tartaras

== See also ==
- Cantons of the Loire department
