= Valfleury =

- Commune
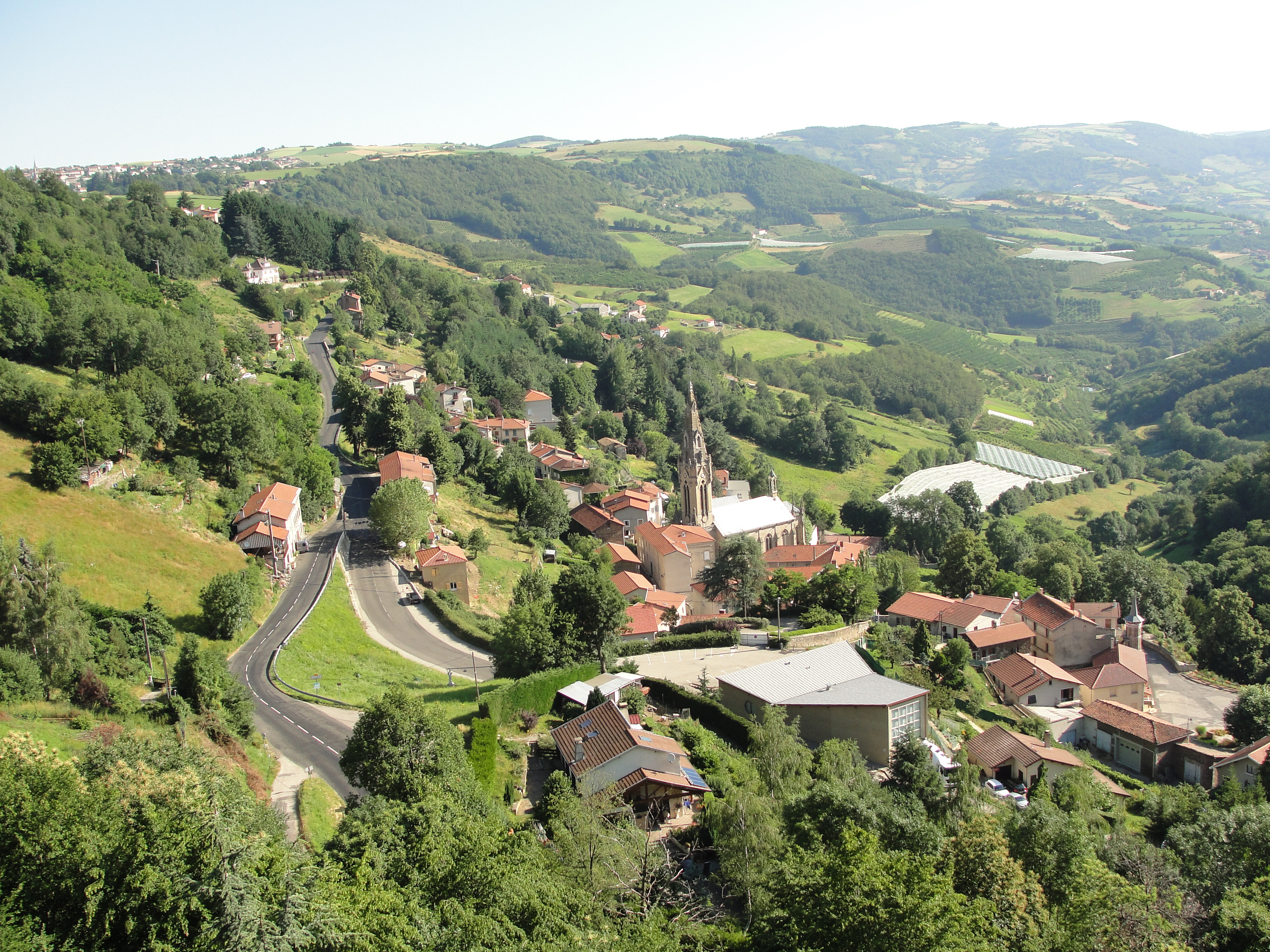
- Location of Valfleury
- Location within France Location within Auvergne-Rhône-Alpes
- Coordinates: 45°31′23″N 4°29′36″E
- Country: France
- Region: Auvergne-Rhône-Alpes
- Department: Loire
- Arrondissement: Saint-Étienne
- Canton: Sorbiers
- Intercommunality: Saint-Étienne Métropole

Government
  - Mayor (2020–2026): Denis Laurent
- Area^{1}: 8.77 km^{2} (3.39 sq mi)
- Elevation: 720 m (2,360 ft)
- Highest elevation: 820 m (2,690 ft)
- Lowest elevation: 359 m (1,178 ft)
- Population (2023): 739
  - Density: 84.3/km^{2} (218/sq mi)
- Time zone: UTC+01:00 (CET)
  - Summer (DST): UTC+02:00 (CEST)
- INSEE/Postal code: 42320 /42320
- ^{1} French Land Register data, which excludes lakes, ponds, glaciers > 1 km^{2} (0.386 sq mi or 247 acres) and river estuaries.

Valfleury (French pronunciation: [valflœʁi]) is a commune in the Loire department in central France.

== Population ==
Historical population
Year	Pop.	±% p.a.
1968	367	—
1975	370	+0.12%
1982	437	+2.41%
1990	486	+1.34%
1999	516	+0.67%
2007	606	+2.03%
2012	701	+2.96%
2017	708	+0.20%
2023	739	+0.72%
Source: INSEE

== See also ==
- Communes of the Loire department
