= L'Étrat =

- Commune
- Coat of arms
- Location of L'Étrat
- Location within France Location within Auvergne-Rhône-Alpes
- Coordinates: 45°29′11″N 4°22′48″E
- Country: France
- Region: Auvergne-Rhône-Alpes
- Department: Loire
- Arrondissement: Saint-Étienne
- Canton: Sorbiers
- Intercommunality: Saint-Étienne Métropole

Government
  - Mayor (2020–2026): Yves Morand
- Area^{1}: 8.48 km^{2} (3.27 sq mi)
- Elevation: 453 m (1,486 ft)
- Highest elevation: 686 m (2,251 ft)
- Lowest elevation: 430 m (1,410 ft)
- Population (2023): 2,879
  - Density: 340/km^{2} (879/sq mi)
- Time zone: UTC+01:00 (CET)
  - Summer (DST): UTC+02:00 (CEST)
- INSEE/Postal code: 42092 /42580
- ^{1} French Land Register data, which excludes lakes, ponds, glaciers > 1 km^{2} (0.386 sq mi or 247 acres) and river estuaries.

L'Étrat (French pronunciation: [letʁa]) is a commune in the Loire department in central France. It was created in 1884 from part of the commune of La Tour-en-Jarez.

== Population ==
Historical population

Year	Pop.	±% p.a.
1886	1,008	—
1901	1,079	+0.45%
1926	1,074	−0.02%
1946	1,279	+0.88%
1962	1,322	+0.21%
1968	1,523	+2.39%
1975	2,147	+5.03%

Year	Pop.	±% p.a.
1982	2,309	+1.04%
1990	2,524	+1.12%
1999	2,519	−0.02%
2007	2,683	+0.79%
2012	2,684	+0.01%
2017	2,531	−1.17%
2023	2,879	+2.17%

Source: EHESS and INSEE (1968-2023)

== Twin towns ==
L'Étrat is twinned with:

- Vörstetten, Germany

== See also ==
- Communes of the Loire department
