= Mornant =

- Commune
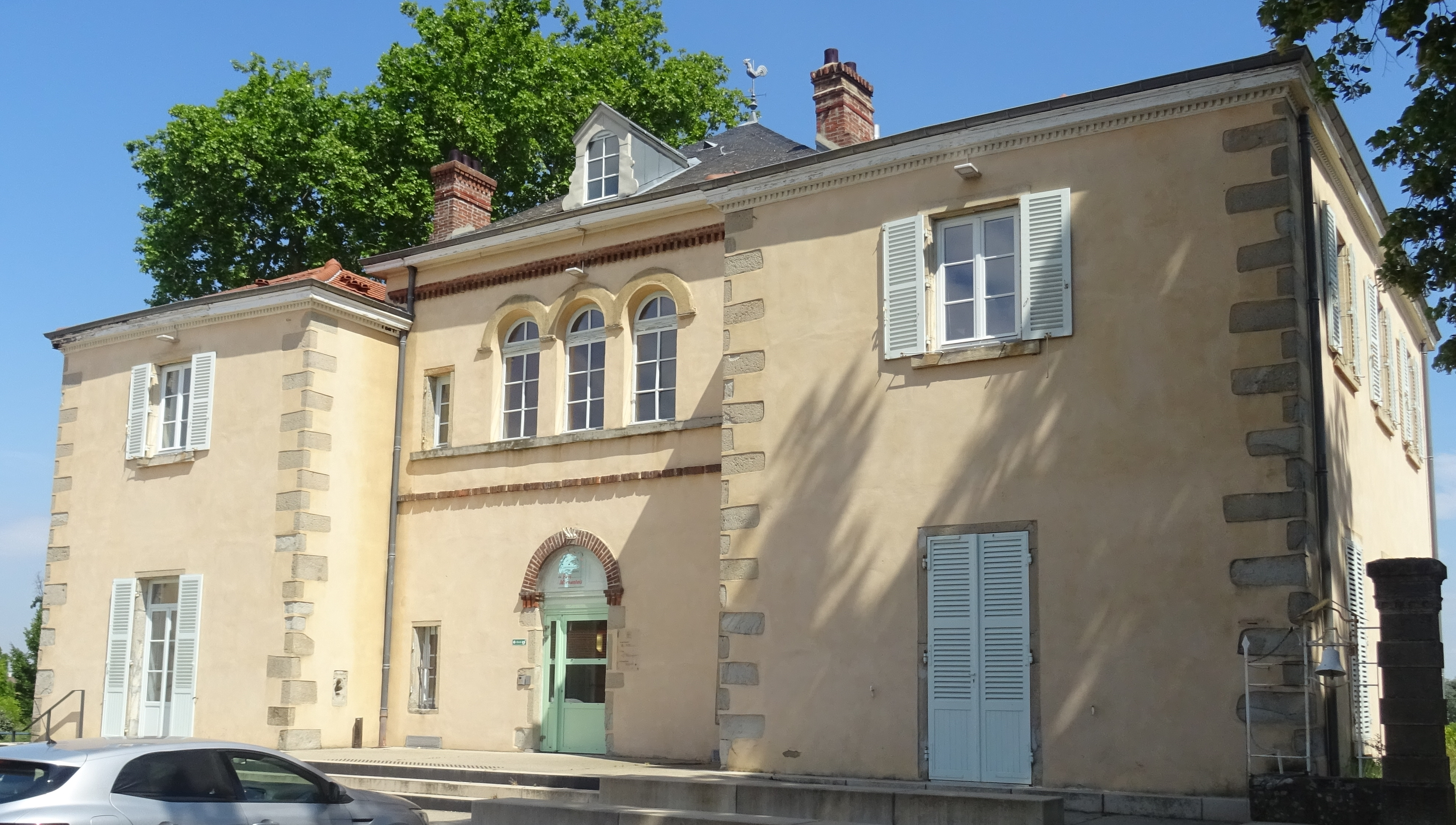
- Château Founereau

- Coat of arms
- Location of Mornant
- Location within France Location within Auvergne-Rhône-Alpes
- Coordinates: 45°37′11″N 4°40′23″E
- Country: France
- Region: Auvergne-Rhône-Alpes
- Department: Rhône
- Arrondissement: Lyon
- Canton: Mornant
- Intercommunality: CC du Pays Mornantais

Government
  - Mayor (2020–2026): Renaud Pfeffer
- Area^{1}: 15.76 km^{2} (6.08 sq mi)
- Elevation: 368 m (1,207 ft)
- Highest elevation: 471 m (1,545 ft)
- Lowest elevation: 287 m (942 ft)
- Population (2023): 6,282
  - Density: 398.6/km^{2} (1,032/sq mi)
- Demonym: Mornantais
- Time zone: UTC+01:00 (CET)
  - Summer (DST): UTC+02:00 (CEST)
- INSEE/Postal code: 69141 /69440
- Website: www.ville-mornant.fr
- ^{1} French Land Register data, which excludes lakes, ponds, glaciers > 1 km^{2} (0.386 sq mi or 247 acres) and river estuaries.

Mornant (French pronunciation: [mɔʁnɑ̃]) is a commune in the Rhône department southwest of Lyon in central-eastern France.

== Population ==
Historical population
| Year | Pop. | ±% p.a. |
|---|---|---|
| 1968 | 2,335 | — |
| 1975 | 2,730 | +2.26% |
| 1982 | 3,323 | +2.85% |
| 1990 | 3,900 | +2.02% |
| 1999 | 4,672 | +2.03% |
| 2007 | 5,279 | +1.54% |
| 2012 | 5,545 | +0.99% |
| 2017 | 5,938 | +1.38% |
| 2023 | 6,282 | +0.94% |
Source: INSEE

== See also ==
- Communes of the Rhône department
