= Saint-Christo-en-Jarez =

- Commune
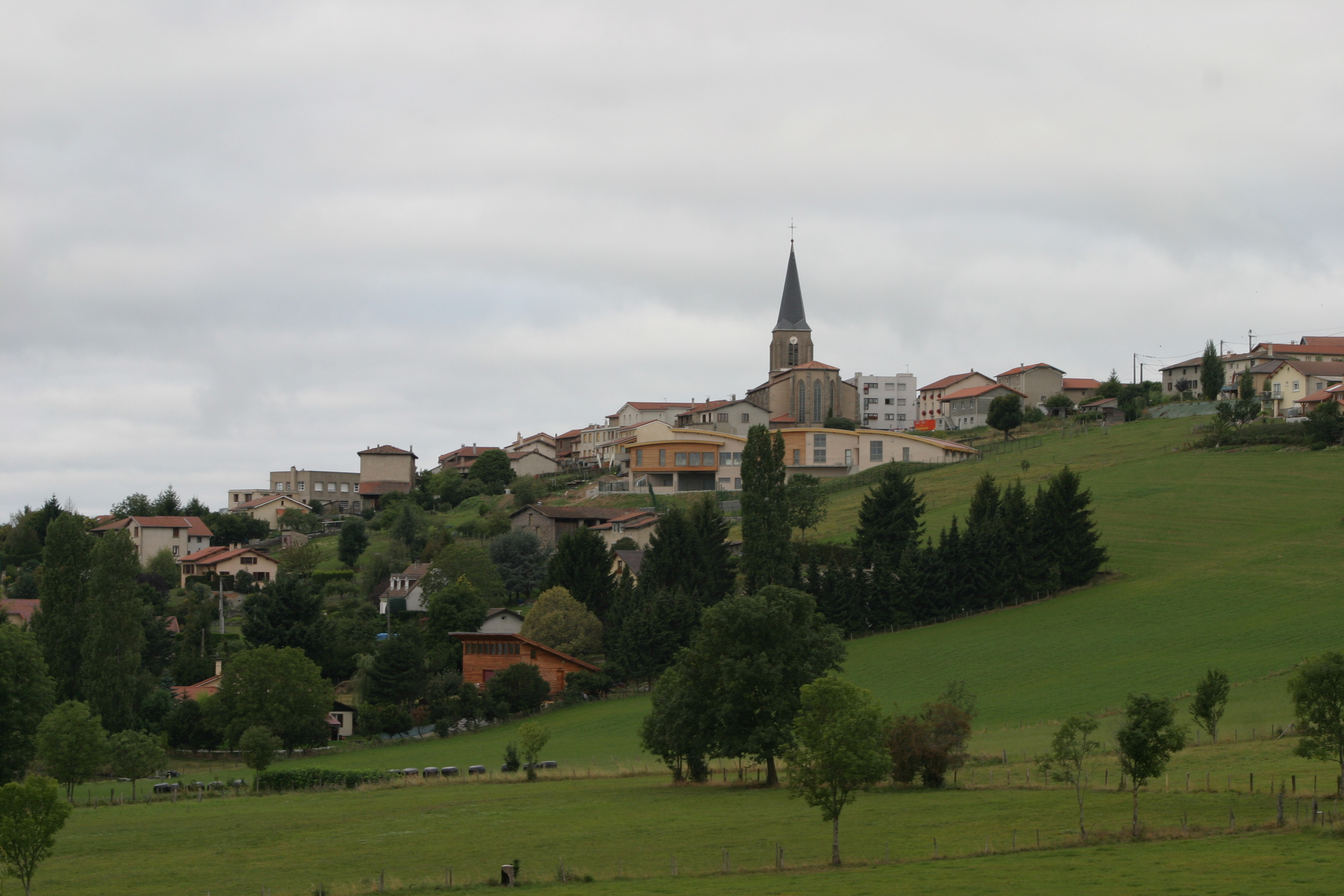
- Location of Saint-Christo-en-Jarez
- Location within France Location within Auvergne-Rhône-Alpes
- Coordinates: 45°32′44″N 4°29′15″E
- Country: France
- Region: Auvergne-Rhône-Alpes
- Department: Loire
- Arrondissement: Saint-Étienne
- Canton: Sorbiers
- Intercommunality: Saint-Étienne Métropole

Government
  - Mayor (2023–2026): Pascal Fayolle
- Area^{1}: 21.77 km^{2} (8.41 sq mi)
- Elevation: 810 m (2,660 ft)
- Highest elevation: 885 m (2,904 ft)
- Lowest elevation: 540 m (1,770 ft)
- Population (2023): 1,885
  - Density: 86.59/km^{2} (224.3/sq mi)
- Time zone: UTC+01:00 (CET)
  - Summer (DST): UTC+02:00 (CEST)
- INSEE/Postal code: 42208 /42320
- ^{1} French Land Register data, which excludes lakes, ponds, glaciers > 1 km^{2} (0.386 sq mi or 247 acres) and river estuaries.

Saint-Christo-en-Jarez (French pronunciation: [sɛ̃ kʁisto ɑ̃ ʒaʁɛ]) is a commune in the Loire department in central France.

== Population ==
Historical population
| Year | Pop. | ±% p.a. |
|---|---|---|
| 1968 | 1,074 | — |
| 1975 | 988 | −1.19% |
| 1982 | 1,146 | +2.14% |
| 1990 | 1,288 | +1.47% |
| 1999 | 1,365 | +0.65% |
| 2007 | 1,738 | +3.07% |
| 2012 | 1,842 | +1.17% |
| 2017 | 1,891 | +0.53% |
| 2023 | 1,885 | −0.05% |
Source: INSEE

== Twin towns ==
Saint-Christo-en-Jarez is twinned with:

- Brembio, Italy, since 2004

== See also ==
- Communes of the Loire department
