= Genilac =

- Commune
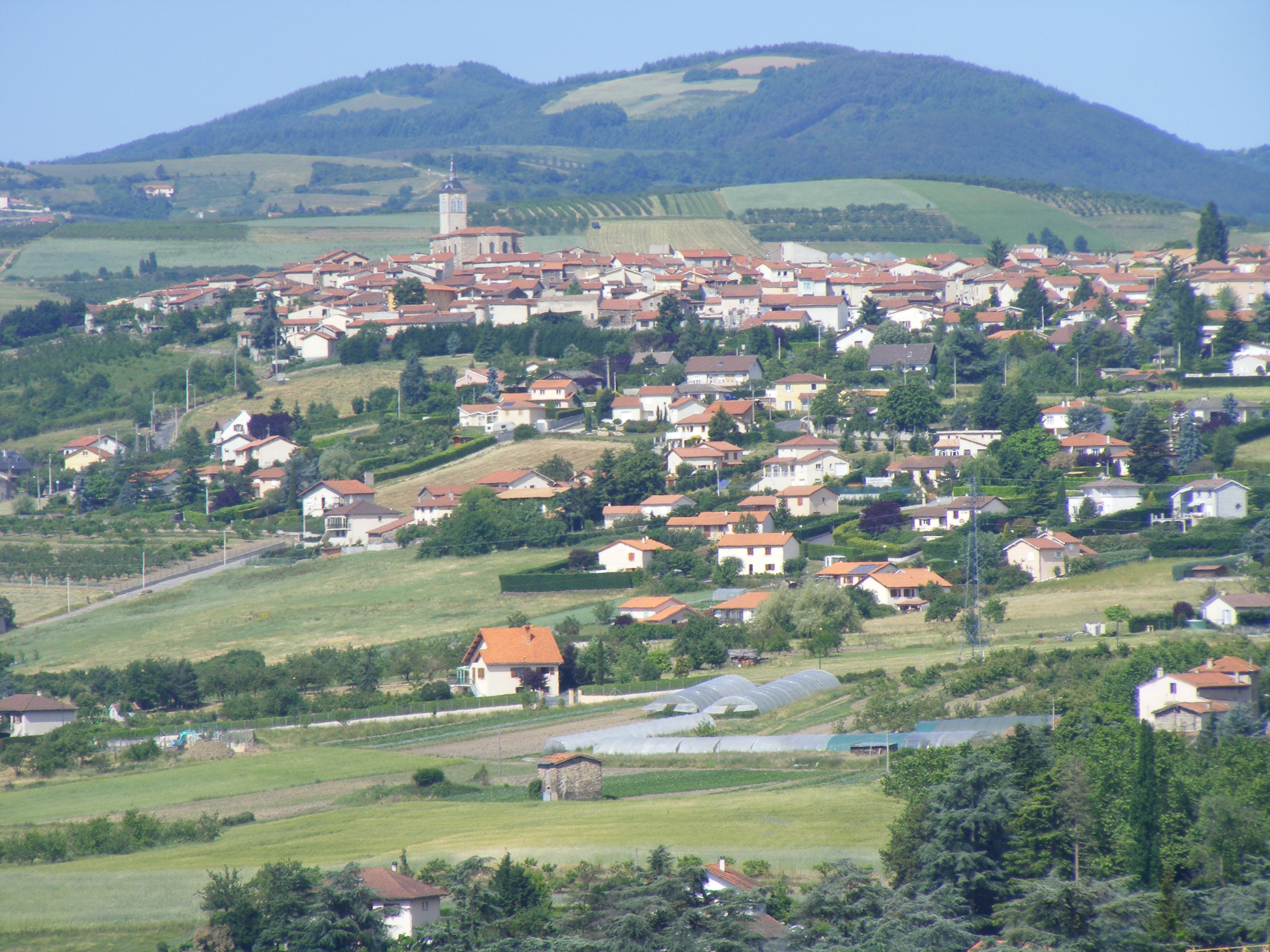

- Coat of arms
- Location of Genilac
- Location within France Location within Auvergne-Rhône-Alpes
- Coordinates: 45°31′59″N 4°34′57″E
- Country: France
- Region: Auvergne-Rhône-Alpes
- Department: Loire
- Arrondissement: Saint-Étienne
- Canton: Rive-de-Gier
- Intercommunality: Saint-Étienne Métropole

Government
  - Mayor (2020–2026): Denis Barriol
- Area^{1}: 8.67 km^{2} (3.35 sq mi)
- Highest elevation: 588 m (1,929 ft)
- Lowest elevation: 255 m (837 ft)
- Population (2023): 3,839
  - Density: 443/km^{2} (1,150/sq mi)
- Time zone: UTC+01:00 (CET)
  - Summer (DST): UTC+02:00 (CEST)
- INSEE/Postal code: 42225 /42800
- ^{1} French Land Register data, which excludes lakes, ponds, glaciers > 1 km^{2} (0.386 sq mi or 247 acres) and river estuaries.

Genilac (French pronunciation: [ʒənilak]) is a commune in the Loire department in central France. It was created in 1973 by the merger of two former communes: Saint-Genis-Terrenoire and La Cula.

== Population ==
Population data refer to the commune in its geography as of January 2025.

Historical population
Year	Pop.	±% p.a.
1968	2,181	—
1975	2,533	+2.16%
1982	2,608	+0.42%
1990	2,860	+1.16%
1999	3,104	+0.91%
2007	3,620	+1.94%
2012	3,847	+1.22%
2017	3,896	+0.25%
2023	3,839	−0.25%
Source: INSEE

== See also ==
- Communes of the Loire department
