= Sorbiers, Loire =

Sorbiers
- Commune
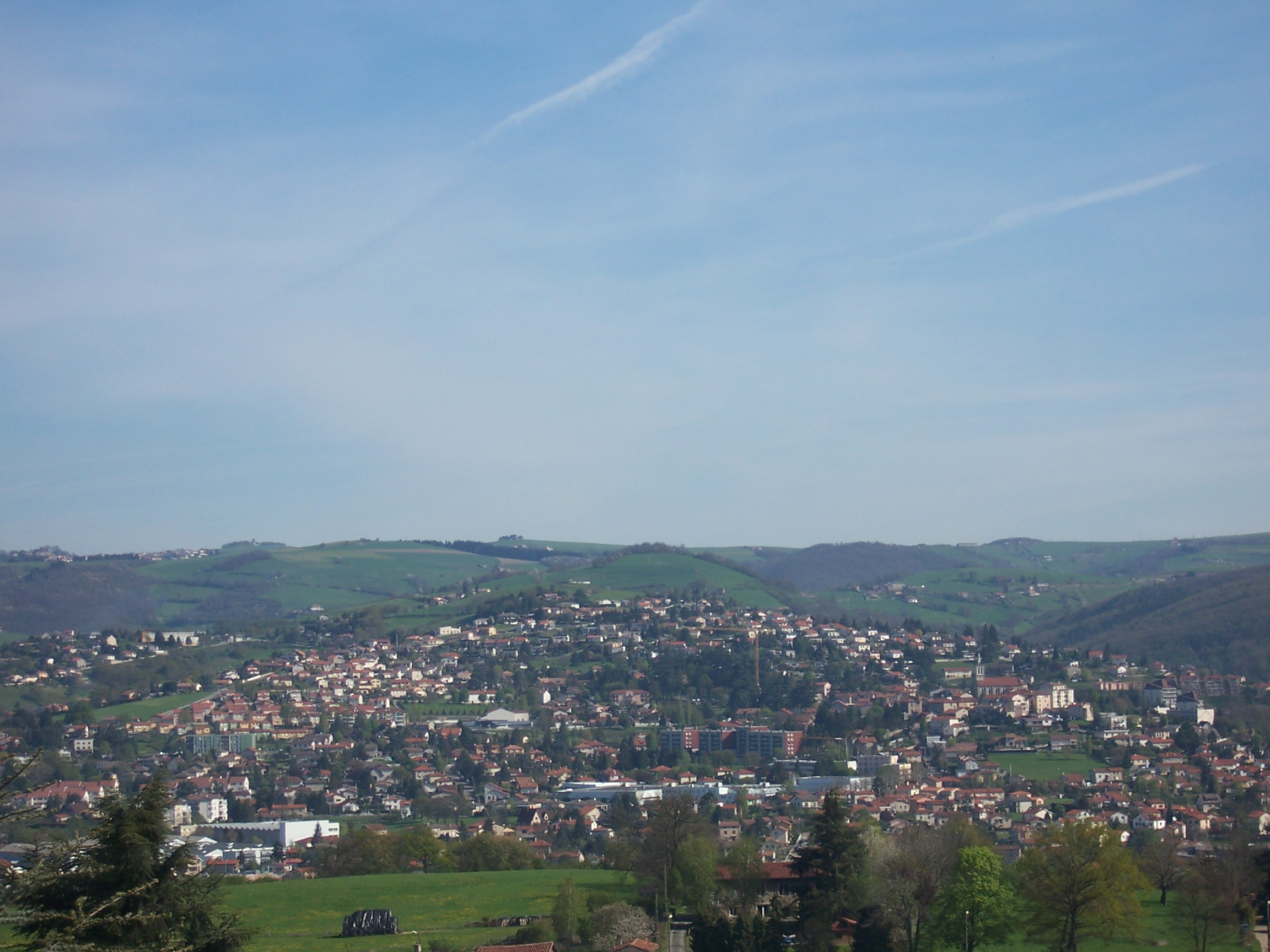

- Coat of arms
- Location of Sorbiers
- Location within France Location within Auvergne-Rhône-Alpes
- Coordinates: 45°29′19″N 4°27′03″E
- Country: France
- Region: Auvergne-Rhône-Alpes
- Department: Loire
- Arrondissement: Saint-Étienne
- Canton: Sorbiers
- Intercommunality: Saint-Étienne Métropole

Government
  - Mayor (2020–2026): Marie-Christine Thivant
- Area^{1}: 12.19 km^{2} (4.71 sq mi)
- Elevation: 520 m (1,710 ft)
- Highest elevation: 822 m (2,697 ft)
- Lowest elevation: 435 m (1,427 ft)
- Population (2023): 8,116
  - Density: 665.8/km^{2} (1,724/sq mi)
- Time zone: UTC+01:00 (CET)
  - Summer (DST): UTC+02:00 (CEST)
- INSEE/Postal code: 42302 /42290
- ^{1} French Land Register data, which excludes lakes, ponds, glaciers > 1 km^{2} (0.386 sq mi or 247 acres) and river estuaries.

Sorbiers (French pronunciation: [sɔʁbje]) is a commune in the Loire department in central France.

== Population ==
Historical population

| Year | Pop. | ±% p.a. |
|---|---|---|
| 1793 | 1,102 | — |
| 1800 | 1,244 | +1.75% |
| 1806 | 1,309 | +0.85% |
| 1821 | 1,405 | +0.47% |
| 1831 | 1,415 | +0.07% |
| 1836 | 1,433 | +0.25% |
| 1841 | 1,616 | +2.43% |
| 1846 | 1,830 | +2.52% |
| 1851 | 2,030 | +2.10% |
| 1856 | 2,632 | +5.33% |
| 1861 | 3,098 | +3.31% |
| 1866 | 3,771 | +4.01% |
| 1872 | 2,023 | −9.86% |

| Year | Pop. | ±% p.a. |
|---|---|---|
| 1876 | 1,990 | −0.41% |
| 1881 | 1,792 | −2.07% |
| 1886 | 1,974 | +1.95% |
| 1891 | 2,017 | +0.43% |
| 1896 | 2,041 | +0.24% |
| 1901 | 1,890 | −1.53% |
| 1906 | 1,979 | +0.92% |
| 1911 | 1,781 | −2.09% |
| 1921 | 1,721 | −0.34% |
| 1926 | 1,871 | +1.69% |
| 1931 | 1,796 | −0.81% |
| 1936 | 1,863 | +0.74% |
| 1946 | 2,069 | +1.05% |

| Year | Pop. | ±% p.a. |
|---|---|---|
| 1954 | 2,298 | +1.32% |
| 1962 | 2,638 | +1.74% |
| 1968 | 3,648 | +5.55% |
| 1975 | 5,464 | +5.94% |
| 1982 | 6,424 | +2.34% |
| 1990 | 7,101 | +1.26% |
| 1999 | 7,399 | +0.46% |
| 2007 | 7,581 | +0.30% |
| 2012 | 7,868 | +0.75% |
| 2017 | 7,933 | +0.16% |
| 2023 | 8,116 | +0.38% |

Source: EHESS and INSEE (1968-2023)

== Twin towns – sister cities ==
Sorbiers is twinned with:

- Senj, Croatia
- Novi Ligure, Italy

== See also ==
- Communes of the Loire department
