= Farnay =

- Commune
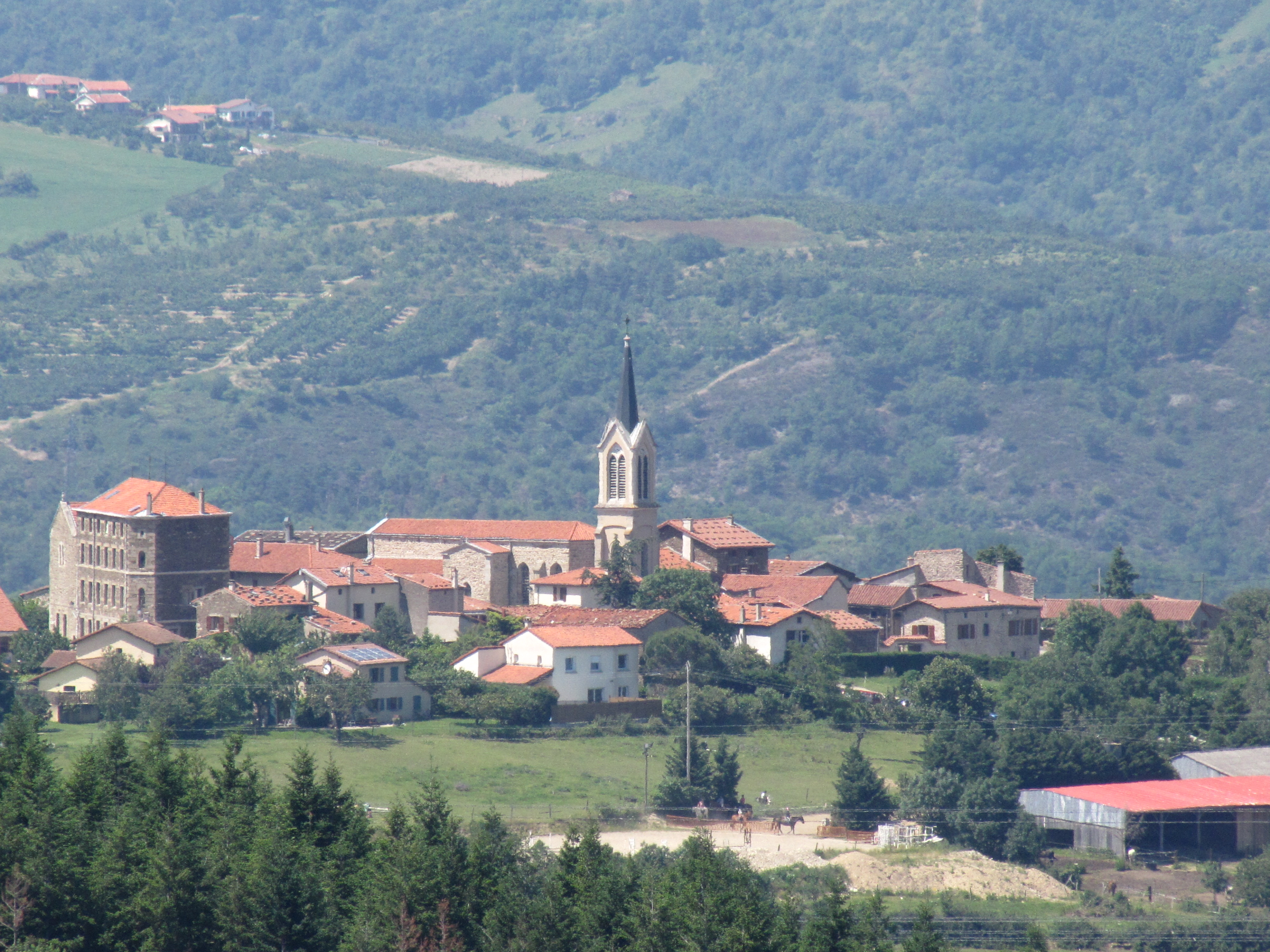
- Location of Farnay
- Location within France Location within Auvergne-Rhône-Alpes
- Coordinates: 45°29′35″N 4°35′52″E
- Country: France
- Region: Auvergne-Rhône-Alpes
- Department: Loire
- Arrondissement: Saint-Étienne
- Canton: Rive-de-Gier
- Intercommunality: Saint-Étienne Métropole

Government
  - Mayor (2020–2026): Jean-Alain Barrier
- Area^{1}: 7.93 km^{2} (3.06 sq mi)
- Elevation: 445 m (1,460 ft)
- Highest elevation: 792 m (2,598 ft)
- Lowest elevation: 315 m (1,033 ft)
- Population (2023): 1,355
  - Density: 171/km^{2} (443/sq mi)
- Time zone: UTC+01:00 (CET)
  - Summer (DST): UTC+02:00 (CEST)
- INSEE/Postal code: 42093 /42320
- ^{1} French Land Register data, which excludes lakes, ponds, glaciers > 1 km^{2} (0.386 sq mi or 247 acres) and river estuaries.

Farnay (French pronunciation: [faʁnɛ]) is a commune in the Loire department in central France.

== Population ==
Historical population
Year	Pop.	±% p.a.
1968	305	—
1975	446	+5.58%
1982	879	+10.18%
1990	982	+1.39%
1999	1,139	+1.66%
2007	1,252	+1.19%
2012	1,391	+2.13%
2017	1,408	+0.24%
2023	1,355	−0.64%
Source: INSEE

== See also ==
- Communes of the Loire department
