= L'Horme =

- Commune
- Location of L'Horme
- Location within France Location within Auvergne-Rhône-Alpes
- Coordinates: 45°29′14″N 4°32′44″E
- Country: France
- Region: Auvergne-Rhône-Alpes
- Department: Loire
- Arrondissement: Saint-Étienne
- Canton: Saint-Chamond
- Intercommunality: Saint-Étienne Métropole

Government
  - Mayor (2024–2026): Audrey Bertheas
- Area^{1}: 4.4 km^{2} (1.7 sq mi)
- Elevation: 300 m (980 ft)
- Highest elevation: 414 m (1,358 ft)
- Lowest elevation: 299 m (981 ft)
- Population (2023): 4,806
  - Density: 1,100/km^{2} (2,800/sq mi)
- Time zone: UTC+01:00 (CET)
  - Summer (DST): UTC+02:00 (CEST)
- INSEE/Postal code: 42110 /42152
- ^{1} French Land Register data, which excludes lakes, ponds, glaciers > 1 km^{2} (0.386 sq mi or 247 acres) and river estuaries.

L'Horme (French pronunciation: [lɔʁm]) is a commune in the Loire department in central France.

== Population ==
Historical population

Year	Pop.	±% p.a.
1906	3,525	—
1926	4,019	+0.66%
1946	3,472	−0.73%
1962	4,324	+1.38%
1968	5,072	+2.69%
1975	5,028	−0.12%
1982	4,858	−0.49%

Year	Pop.	±% p.a.
1990	4,689	−0.44%
1999	4,639	−0.12%
2007	4,745	+0.28%
2012	4,781	+0.15%
2017	4,790	+0.04%
2023	4,806	+0.06%

Source: EHESS and INSEE (1968-2023)

== Twin towns ==
L'Horme is twinned with:

- Pian di Scò, Italy, since 1993

== See also ==
- Communes of the Loire department
