= La Grand-Croix =

- Commune
- Coat of arms
- Location of La Grand-Croix
- Location within France Location within Auvergne-Rhône-Alpes
- Coordinates: 45°30′14″N 4°34′11″E
- Country: France
- Region: Auvergne-Rhône-Alpes
- Department: Loire
- Arrondissement: Saint-Étienne
- Canton: Rive-de-Gier
- Intercommunality: Saint-Étienne Métropole

Government
  - Mayor (2020–2026): Luc François
- Area^{1}: 4.05 km^{2} (1.56 sq mi)
- Elevation: 289 m (948 ft)
- Highest elevation: 427 m (1,401 ft)
- Lowest elevation: 274 m (899 ft)
- Population (2023): 4,947
  - Density: 1,220/km^{2} (3,160/sq mi)
- Time zone: UTC+01:00 (CET)
  - Summer (DST): UTC+02:00 (CEST)
- INSEE/Postal code: 42103 /42320
- ^{1} French Land Register data, which excludes lakes, ponds, glaciers > 1 km^{2} (0.386 sq mi or 247 acres) and river estuaries.

La Grand-Croix (French pronunciation: [la ɡʁɑ̃ kʁwa]) is a commune and the seat of a canton in the Loire department in central France. It lies in the Gier valley.

The commune was the main town of the former canton of La Grand-Croix, arrondissement of Saint-Étienne.

It lies on the A47 autoroute. Lyon is 40 kilometres (25 mi) to the east, and Saint-Étienne is 18 kilometres (11 mi) to the west. The commune is close to the Parc Naturel Régional du Pilat.

The river Dorlay, a tributary of the Gier that rises in Mont Pilat, forms the border between La Grand-Croix and Lorette.

== Population ==
Historical population

Year	Pop.	±% p.a.
1861	3,056	—
1866	3,664	+3.70%
1872	3,830	+0.74%
1876	4,299	+2.93%
1881	4,322	+0.11%
1886	4,478	+0.71%
1891	4,535	+0.25%
1896	4,765	+0.99%
1901	4,928	+0.67%
1906	4,824	−0.43%
1911	4,878	+0.22%
1921	5,049	+0.35%
1926	4,858	−0.77%
1931	4,711	−0.61%

Year	Pop.	±% p.a.
1936	3,946	−3.48%
1946	4,141	+0.48%
1954	4,549	+1.18%
1962	5,040	+1.29%
1968	5,238	+0.64%
1975	5,088	−0.41%
1982	5,125	+0.10%
1990	4,983	−0.35%
1999	4,962	−0.05%
2007	5,027	+0.16%
2012	5,059	+0.13%
2017	5,136	+0.30%
2023	4,947	−0.62%

Source: EHESS and INSEE (1968-2023)

== Notable people ==
Gustave Malécot (28 December 1911 – 1998), mathematician

== Twin towns ==
La Grand-Croix is twinned with:

- Santa Cruz de la Zarza, Spain, since 1993

== See also ==
- Communes of the Loire department
