= Cellieu =

- Commune
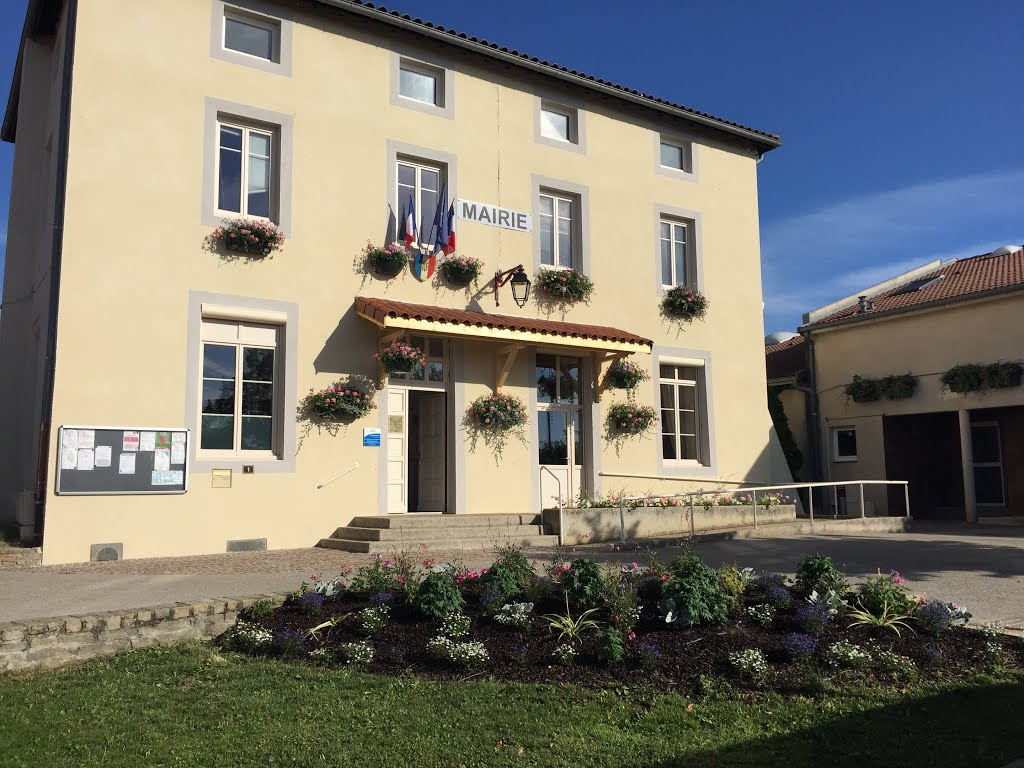
- Town hall

- Coat of arms
- Location of Cellieu
- Location within France Location within Auvergne-Rhône-Alpes
- Coordinates: 45°31′25″N 4°32′30″E
- Country: France
- Region: Auvergne-Rhône-Alpes
- Department: Loire
- Arrondissement: Saint-Étienne
- Canton: Sorbiers
- Intercommunality: Saint-Étienne Métropole

Government
  - Mayor (2020–2026): Marc Tardieu
- Area^{1}: 12.11 km^{2} (4.68 sq mi)
- Elevation: 520 m (1,710 ft)
- Highest elevation: 817 m (2,680 ft)
- Lowest elevation: 352 m (1,155 ft)
- Population (2023): 1,731
  - Density: 142.9/km^{2} (370.2/sq mi)
- Time zone: UTC+01:00 (CET)
  - Summer (DST): UTC+02:00 (CEST)
- INSEE/Postal code: 42032 /42320
- ^{1} French Land Register data, which excludes lakes, ponds, glaciers > 1 km^{2} (0.386 sq mi or 247 acres) and river estuaries.

Cellieu (French pronunciation: [sɛljø]) is a commune in the Loire department in central France.

Since the 2016 reform of the administrative regions, it is located in the exact center of the new region Auvergne-Rhône-Alpes.

== Population ==
Historical population
Year	Pop.	±% p.a.
1968	764	—
1975	870	+1.87%
1982	1,097	+3.37%
1990	1,228	+1.42%
1999	1,466	+1.99%
2007	1,520	+0.45%
2012	1,636	+1.48%
2017	1,697	+0.73%
2023	1,731	+0.33%
Source: INSEE

== See also ==
- Communes of the Loire department
