= Canton of Saint-Germain-Laval =

Coordinates: 45.8657°N 4.0095°E

Saint-Germain-Laval
- Former canton
- Interactive map of Saint-Germain-Laval
- Country: France
- Region: Auvergne-Rhône-Alpes
- Department: Loire
- No. of communes: {{{nbcomm}}}
- Disbanded: 2015
- Area: 196.30 km^{2} (75.79 sq mi)
- Population (2012): 5,988
  - Density: 30.50/km^{2} (79.01/sq mi)

The canton of Saint-Germain-Laval is a French former administrative division located in the department of Loire and the Rhône-Alpes region. It was disbanded following the French canton reorganisation which came into effect in March 2015. It consisted of 14 communes, which joined the canton of Boën-sur-Lignon in 2015. It had 5,988 inhabitants (2012).

The canton comprised the following communes:

- Amions
- Bully
- Dancé
- Grézolles
- Luré
- Nollieux
- Pommiers
- Saint-Georges-de-Baroille
- Saint-Germain-Laval
- Saint-Julien-d'Oddes
- Saint-Martin-la-Sauveté
- Saint-Paul-de-Vézelin
- Saint-Polgues
- Souternon

== See also ==
- Cantons of the Loire department
