= Canton of Noirétable =

Coordinates: 45.7969°N 3.8061°E

Noirétable
- Former canton
- Interactive map of Noirétable
- Country: France
- Region: Auvergne-Rhône-Alpes
- Department: Loire
- No. of communes: {{{nbcomm}}}
- Disbanded: 2015
- Area: 165.22 km^{2} (63.79 sq mi)
- Population (2012): 4,021
  - Density: 24.34/km^{2} (63.03/sq mi)

The canton of Noirétable is a French former administrative division located in the department of Loire and the Rhone-Alpes region. It was disbanded following the French canton reorganisation which came into effect in March 2015. It consisted of 12 communes, which joined the canton of Boën-sur-Lignon in 2015. It had 4,021 inhabitants (2012).

The canton comprised the following communes:

- Cervières
- La Chamba
- La Chambonie
- La Côte-en-Couzan
- Noirétable
- Saint-Didier-sur-Rochefort
- Saint-Jean-la-Vêtre
- Saint-Julien-la-Vêtre
- Saint-Priest-la-Vêtre
- Saint-Thurin
- Les Salles
- La Valla-sur-Rochefort

== See also ==
- Cantons of the Loire department
