= Canton of Saint-Georges-en-Couzan =

Coordinates: 45.6992°N 3.9110°E

Saint-Georges-en-Couzan
- Former canton
- Interactive map of Saint-Georges-en-Couzan
- Country: France
- Region: Auvergne-Rhône-Alpes
- Department: Loire
- No. of communes: {{{nbcomm}}}
- Disbanded: 2015
- Area: 201.31 km^{2} (77.73 sq mi)
- Population (2012): 3,662
  - Density: 18.19/km^{2} (47.11/sq mi)

The canton of Saint-Georges-en-Couzan is a French former administrative division located in the department of Loire and the Rhône-Alpes region. It was disbanded following the French canton reorganisation which came into effect in March 2015. It consisted of 9 communes, which joined the canton of Boën-sur-Lignon in 2015. It had 3,662 inhabitants (2012).

The canton comprised the following communes:

- Chalmazel
- Châtelneuf
- Jeansagnière
- Palogneux
- Sail-sous-Couzan
- Saint-Bonnet-le-Courreau
- Saint-Georges-en-Couzan
- Saint-Just-en-Bas
- Sauvain

== See also ==
- Cantons of the Loire department
