= Cervières =

Cervières may refer to the following places in France:

- Cervières, Hautes-Alpes, a commune in the department of Hautes-Alpes
- Cervières, Loire, a commune in the department of Loire
