= Bussy-Albieux =

Bussy-Albieux Bussi-Arbiô (Arpitan)
- Commune
- Coat of arms
- Location of Bussy-Albieux
- Location within France Location within Auvergne-Rhône-Alpes
- Coordinates: 45°47′38″N 4°02′04″E
- Country: France
- Region: Auvergne-Rhône-Alpes
- Department: Loire
- Arrondissement: Montbrison
- Canton: Boën-sur-Lignon
- Intercommunality: CA Loire Forez

Government
  - Mayor (2020–2026): Serge Derory
- Area^{1}: 19.65 km^{2} (7.59 sq mi)
- Elevation: 380 m (1,250 ft)
- Highest elevation: 534 m (1,752 ft)
- Lowest elevation: 339 m (1,112 ft)
- Population (2023): 547
  - Density: 27.8/km^{2} (72.1/sq mi)
- Time zone: UTC+01:00 (CET)
  - Summer (DST): UTC+02:00 (CEST)
- INSEE/Postal code: 42030 /42260
- ^{1} French Land Register data, which excludes lakes, ponds, glaciers > 1 km^{2} (0.386 sq mi or 247 acres) and river estuaries.

Bussy-Albieux (French pronunciation: [bysi albjø]; Arpitan: Bussi-Arbiô [by.ˈsi aʀ.ˈbjø]) is a commune in the Loire department in central France.

== Population ==
Historical population
Year	Pop.	±% p.a.
1968	486	—
1975	478	−0.24%
1982	434	−1.37%
1990	448	+0.40%
1999	441	−0.17%
2007	464	+0.64%
2012	483	+0.81%
2017	537	+2.14%
2023	547	+0.31%
Source: INSEE

== See also ==
- Communes of the Loire department
