= Arthun =

- Commune
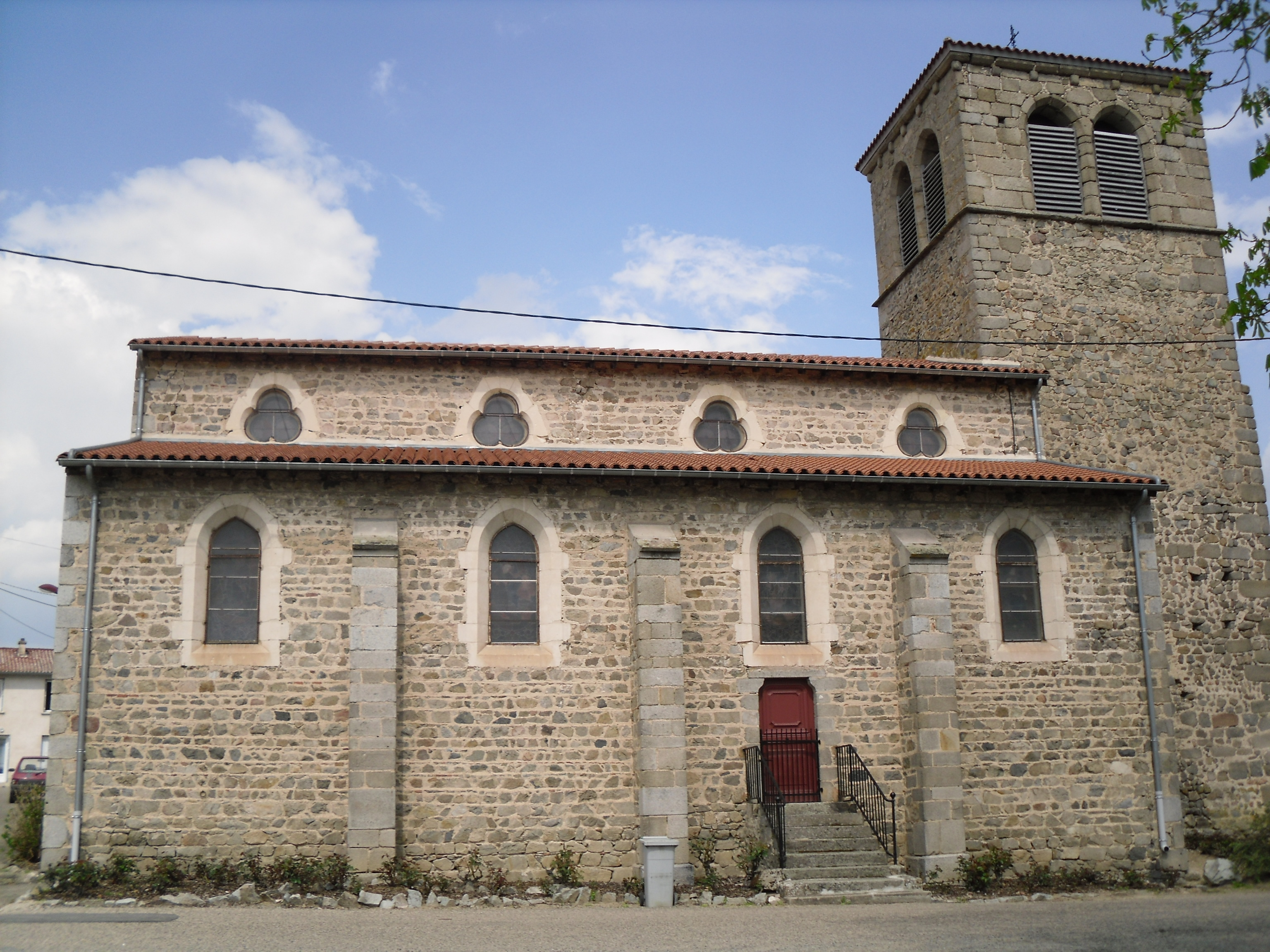

- Coat of arms
- Location of Arthun
- Location within France Location within Auvergne-Rhône-Alpes
- Coordinates: 45°46′26″N 4°02′05″E
- Country: France
- Region: Auvergne-Rhône-Alpes
- Department: Loire
- Arrondissement: Montbrison
- Canton: Boën-sur-Lignon
- Intercommunality: CA Loire Forez

Government
  - Mayor (2020–2026): Jean-Claude Garde
- Area^{1}: 13.88 km^{2} (5.36 sq mi)
- Elevation: 400 m (1,300 ft)
- Highest elevation: 502 m (1,647 ft)
- Lowest elevation: 346 m (1,135 ft)
- Population (2023): 532
  - Density: 38.3/km^{2} (99.3/sq mi)
- Time zone: UTC+01:00 (CET)
  - Summer (DST): UTC+02:00 (CEST)
- INSEE/Postal code: 42009 /42130
- ^{1} French Land Register data, which excludes lakes, ponds, glaciers > 1 km^{2} (0.386 sq mi or 247 acres) and river estuaries.

Arthun (French pronunciation: [aʁtœ̃]) is a commune in the Loire department in central France.

== Population ==
Historical population
Year	Pop.	±% p.a.
1968	410	—
1975	423	+0.45%
1982	473	+1.61%
1990	450	−0.62%
1999	461	+0.27%
2007	486	+0.66%
2012	540	+2.13%
2017	542	+0.07%
2023	532	−0.31%
Source: INSEE

== See also ==
- Communes of the Loire department
