= Communes of the Loire department =

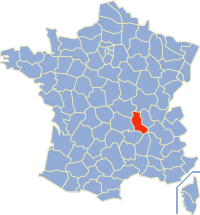

The following is a list of the 320 communes of the Loire department of France.

The communes cooperate in the following intercommunalities (as of 2025):

- Saint-Étienne Métropole
- CA Loire Forez Agglomération
- CA Roannais Agglomération
- Communauté de communes Charlieu-Belmont
- Communauté de communes de Forez-Est
- Communauté de communes des Monts du Lyonnais (partly)
- Communauté de communes des Monts du Pilat
- Communauté de communes du Pays entre Loire et Rhône
- Communauté de communes du Pays d'Urfé
- Communauté de communes du Pilat Rhodanien
- Communauté de communes des Vals d'Aix et Isable

INSEE	Postal	Commune
42001	42380	Aboën
42002	42130	Ailleux
42003	42820	Ambierle
42005	42160	Andrézieux-Bouthéon
42006	42550	Apinac
42007	42460	Arcinges
42008	42370	Arcon
42009	42130	Arthun
42010	42330	Aveizieux
42011	42510	Balbigny
42012	42600	Bard
42013	42210	Bellegarde-en-Forez
42014	42670	Belleroche
42015	42670	Belmont-de-la-Loire
42016	42720	La Bénisson-Dieu
42017	42660	Le Bessat
42018	42520	Bessey
42019	42130	Boën-sur-Lignon
42020	42210	Boisset-lès-Montrond
42021	42560	Boisset-Saint-Priest
42022	42160	Bonson
42023	42220	Bourg-Argental
42025	42460	Boyer
42026	42720	Briennon
42027	42260	Bully
42028	42220	Burdignes
42029	42510	Bussières
42030	42260	Bussy-Albieux
42031	42240	Çaloire
42032	42320	Cellieu
42033	42460	Le Cergne
42034	42440	Cervières
42035	42130	Cezay
42036	42800	Chagnon
42037	42600	Chalain-d'Uzore
42038	42600	Chalain-le-Comtal
42039	42920	Chalmazel-Jeansagnière
42040	42440	La Chamba
42041	42110	Chambéon
42042	42170	Chambles
42043	42330	Chambœuf
42044	42500	Le Chambon-Feugerolles
42045	42440	La Chambonie
42046	42600	Champdieu
42047	42430	Champoly
42048	42190	Chandon
42049	42310	Changy
42050	42380	La Chapelle-en-Lafaye
42051	42410	La Chapelle-Villars
42052	42190	Charlieu
42053	42800	Châteauneuf
42054	42940	Châtelneuf
42055	42140	Châtelus
42339	42430	Chausseterre
42056	42410	Chavanay
42058	42560	Chazelles-sur-Lavieu
42059	42140	Chazelles-sur-Lyon
42060	42560	Chenereilles
42061	42430	Cherier
42062	42140	Chevrières
42063	42114	Chirassimont
42064	42410	Chuyer
42065	42110	Civens
42066	42110	Cleppé
42067	42220	Colombier
42068	42840	Combre
42069	42120	Commelle-Vernay
42070	42123	Cordelle
42071	42120	Le Coteau
42072	42111	La Côte-Saint-Didier
42073	42360	Cottance
42074	42460	Coutouvre
42075	42210	Craintilleux
42076	42260	Cremeaux
42077	42540	Croizet-sur-Gand
42078	42310	Le Crozet
42079	42460	Cuinzier
42081	42330	Cuzieu
42083	42800	Dargoire
42085	42740	Doizieux
42086	42670	Écoche
42087	42600	Écotay-l'Olme
42088	42110	Épercieux-Saint-Paul
42089	42600	Essertines-en-Châtelneuf
42090	42360	Essertines-en-Donzy
42091	42380	Estivareilles
42092	42580	L'Étrat
42093	42320	Farnay
42094	42110	Feurs
42095	42700	Firminy
42096	42140	Fontanès
42097	42480	La Fouillouse
42098	42470	Fourneaux
42099	42490	Fraisses
42225	42800	Genilac
42100	42140	La Gimond
42101	42220	Graix
42102	42140	Grammond
42103	42320	La Grand-Croix
42104	42460	La Gresle
42105	42600	Grézieux-le-Fromental
42106	42260	Grézolles
42107	42560	Gumières
42108	42210	L'Hôpital-le-Grand
42110	42152	L'Horme
42112	42460	Jarnosse
42113	42110	Jas
42115	42660	Jonzieux
42116	42430	Juré
42117	42560	Lavieu
42118	42470	Lay
42119	42130	Leigneux
42120	42155	Lentigny
42121	42600	Lérigneux
42122	42600	Lézigneux
42123	42420	Lorette
42124	42520	Lupé
42125	42260	Luré
42126	42380	Luriecq
42127	42300	Mably
42128	42114	Machézal
42129	42520	Maclas
42130	42600	Magneux-Haute-Rive
42131	42750	Maizilly
42132	42520	Malleval
42133	42140	Marcenod
42134	42130	Marcilly-le-Châtel
42135	42210	Marclopt
42136	42130	Marcoux
42137	42560	Margerie-Chantagret
42138	42140	Maringes
42139	42660	Marlhes
42140	42560	Marols
42141	42750	Mars
42142	42380	Merle-Leignec
42143	42110	Mizérieux
42145	42840	Montagny
42146	42380	Montarcher
42147	42600	Montbrison
42148	42360	Montchal
42149	42210	Montrond-les-Bains
42150	42130	Montverdun
42151	42600	Mornand-en-Forez
42152	42720	Nandax
42153	42470	Neaux
42154	42510	Néronde
42155	42510	Nervieux
42156	42590	Neulise
42157	42640	Noailly
42158	42370	Les Noës
42159	42440	Noirétable
42160	42260	Nollieux
42161	42120	Notre-Dame-de-Boisset
42162	42155	Ouches
42163	42310	La Pacaudière
42164	42890	Palogneux
42165	42360	Panissières
42166	42120	Parigny
42167	42410	Pavezin

INSEE	Postal	Commune
42168	42410	Pélussin
42169	42380	Périgneux
42170	42120	Perreux
42171	42590	Pinay
42172	42660	Planfoy
42173	42260	Pommiers-en-Forez
42174	42110	Poncins
42175	42110	Pouilly-lès-Feurs
42176	42155	Pouilly-les-Nonains
42177	42720	Pouilly-sous-Charlieu
42178	42630	Pradines
42179	42600	Pralong
42180	42600	Précieux
42181	42630	Régny
42182	42370	Renaison
42183	42150	La Ricamarie
42184	42153	Riorges
42185	42340	Rivas
42186	42800	Rive-de-Gier
42187	42300	Roanne
42188	42600	Roche-en-Forez
42189	42230	Roche-la-Molière
42191	42520	Roisey
42192	42380	Rozier-Côtes-d'Aurec
42193	42810	Rozier-en-Donzy
42194	42310	Sail-les-Bains
42195	42890	Sail-sous-Couzan
42198	42370	Saint-Alban-les-Eaux
42199	42370	Saint-André-d'Apchon
42200	42210	Saint-André-le-Puy
42201	42520	Saint-Appolinard
42202	42110	Saint-Barthélemy-Lestra
42203	42310	Saint-Bonnet-des-Quarts
42204	42380	Saint-Bonnet-le-Château
42205	42940	Saint-Bonnet-le-Courreau
42206	42330	Saint-Bonnet-les-Oules
42207	42400	Saint-Chamond
42208	42320	Saint-Christo-en-Jarez
42211	42160	Saint-Cyprien
42212	42123	Saint-Cyr-de-Favières
42213	42114	Saint-Cyr-de-Valorges
42214	42210	Saint-Cyr-les-Vignes
42215	42750	Saint-Denis-de-Cabanne
42216	42140	Saint-Denis-sur-Coise
42196	42510	Sainte-Agathe-en-Donzy
42197	42130	Sainte-Agathe-la-Bouteresse
42209	42540	Sainte-Colombe-sur-Gand
42210	42800	Sainte-Croix-en-Jarez
42221	42110	Sainte-Foy-Saint-Sulpice
42218	42000	Saint-Étienne
42219	42130	Saint-Étienne-le-Molard
42220	42640	Saint-Forgeux-Lespinasse
42222	42330	Saint-Galmier
42223	42530	Saint-Genest-Lerpt
42224	42660	Saint-Genest-Malifaux
42226	42510	Saint-Georges-de-Baroille
42227	42990	Saint-Georges-en-Couzan
42228	42610	Saint-Georges-Haute-Ville
42229	42670	Saint-Germain-la-Montagne
42230	42260	Saint-Germain-Laval
42231	42640	Saint-Germain-Lespinasse
42232	42370	Saint-Haon-le-Châtel
42233	42370	Saint-Haon-le-Vieux
42234	42570	Saint-Héand
42235	42380	Saint-Hilaire-Cusson-la-Valmitte
42236	42190	Saint-Hilaire-sous-Charlieu
42237	42650	Saint-Jean-Bonnefonds
42238	42440	Saint-Jean-la-Vêtre
42239	42155	Saint-Jean-Saint-Maurice-sur-Loire
42240	42560	Saint-Jean-Soleymieux
42241	42590	Saint-Jodard
42242	42800	Saint-Joseph
42243	42260	Saint-Julien-d'Oddes
42246	42220	Saint-Julien-Molin-Molette
42247	42990	Saint-Just-en-Bas
42248	42430	Saint-Just-en-Chevalet
42249	42540	Saint-Just-la-Pendue
42279	42170	Saint-Just-Saint-Rambert
42251	42210	Saint-Laurent-la-Conche
42253	42155	Saint-Léger-sur-Roanne
42254	42122	Saint-Marcel-de-Félines
42255	42430	Saint-Marcel-d'Urfé
42256	42680	Saint-Marcellin-en-Forez
42257	42620	Saint-Martin-d'Estréaux
42259	42800	Saint-Martin-la-Plaine
42260	42260	Saint-Martin-la-Sauveté
42261	42110	Saint-Martin-Lestra
42262	42240	Saint-Maurice-en-Gourgois
42264	42330	Saint-Médard-en-Forez
42265	42410	Saint-Michel-sur-Rhône
42266	42380	Saint-Nizier-de-Fornas
42267	42190	Saint-Nizier-sous-Charlieu
42269	42600	Saint-Paul-d'Uzore
42270	42240	Saint-Paul-en-Cornillon
42271	42740	Saint-Paul-en-Jarez
42272	42520	Saint-Pierre-de-Bœuf
42273	42190	Saint-Pierre-la-Noaille
42274	42260	Saint-Polgues
42275	42270	Saint-Priest-en-Jarez
42276	42830	Saint-Priest-la-Prugne
42277	42590	Saint-Priest-la-Roche
42278	42440	Saint-Priest-la-Vêtre
42280	42660	Saint-Régis-du-Coin
42281	42370	Saint-Rirand
42282	42430	Saint-Romain-d'Urfé
42283	42800	Saint-Romain-en-Jarez
42284	42640	Saint-Romain-la-Motte
42285	42610	Saint-Romain-le-Puy
42286	42660	Saint-Romain-les-Atheux
42287	42220	Saint-Sauveur-en-Rue
42288	42130	Saint-Sixte
42289	42470	Saint-Symphorien-de-Lay
42290	42600	Saint-Thomas-la-Garde
42293	42630	Saint-Victor-sur-Rhins
42294	42120	Saint-Vincent-de-Boisset
42295	42440	Les Salles
42296	42110	Salt-en-Donzy
42297	42110	Salvizinet
42298	42990	Sauvain
42299	42600	Savigneux
42300	42460	Sevelinges
42301	42560	Soleymieux
42084	42130	Solore-en-Forez
42302	42290	Sorbiers
42303	42260	Souternon
42304	42450	Sury-le-Comtal
42305	42350	La Talaudière
42306	42660	Tarentaise
42307	42800	Tartaras
42308	42740	La Terrasse-sur-Dorlay
42310	42220	Thélis-la-Combe
42311	42580	La Tour-en-Jarez
42312	42380	La Tourette
42313	42130	Trelins
42314	42830	La Tuilière
42315	42210	Unias
42316	42240	Unieux
42317	42310	Urbise
42318	42550	Usson-en-Forez
42319	42110	Valeille
42320	42320	Valfleury
42322	42131	La Valla-en-Gier
42321	42111	La Valla-sur-Rochefort
42323	42340	Veauche
42324	42340	Veauchette
42325	42590	Vendranges
42326	42520	Véranne
42327	42410	Vérin
42328	42600	Verrières-en-Forez
42329	42220	La Versanne
42245	42440	Vêtre-sur-Anzon
42268	42590	Vézelin-sur-Loire
42330	42390	Villars
42331	42155	Villemontais
42332	42300	Villerest
42333	42460	Villers
42334	42780	Violay
42335	42140	Viricelles
42336	42140	Virigneux
42337	42310	Vivans
42338	42720	Vougy
