= Pralong =

- Commune
- Coat of arms
- Location of Pralong
- Location within France Location within Auvergne-Rhône-Alpes
- Coordinates: 45°39′59″N 4°01′52″E
- Country: France
- Region: Auvergne-Rhône-Alpes
- Department: Loire
- Arrondissement: Montbrison
- Canton: Boën-sur-Lignon
- Intercommunality: CA Loire Forez

Government
  - Mayor (2020–2026): Pierre Garbil
- Area^{1}: 8.03 km^{2} (3.10 sq mi)
- Elevation: 440 m (1,440 ft)
- Highest elevation: 716 m (2,349 ft)
- Lowest elevation: 398 m (1,306 ft)
- Population (2023): 842
  - Density: 105/km^{2} (272/sq mi)
- Time zone: UTC+01:00 (CET)
  - Summer (DST): UTC+02:00 (CEST)
- INSEE/Postal code: 42179 /42600
- ^{1} French Land Register data, which excludes lakes, ponds, glaciers > 1 km^{2} (0.386 sq mi or 247 acres) and river estuaries.

Pralong (French pronunciation: [pʁalɔ̃]) is a commune in the Loire department in central France.

== Population ==
Historical population
Year	Pop.	±% p.a.
1968	322	—
1975	388	+2.70%
1982	532	+4.61%
1990	614	+1.81%
1999	680	+1.14%
2007	844	+2.74%
2012	883	+0.91%
2017	847	−0.83%
2023	842	−0.10%
Source: INSEE

== See also ==
- Communes of the Loire department
