= Essertines-en-Châtelneuf =

- Commune
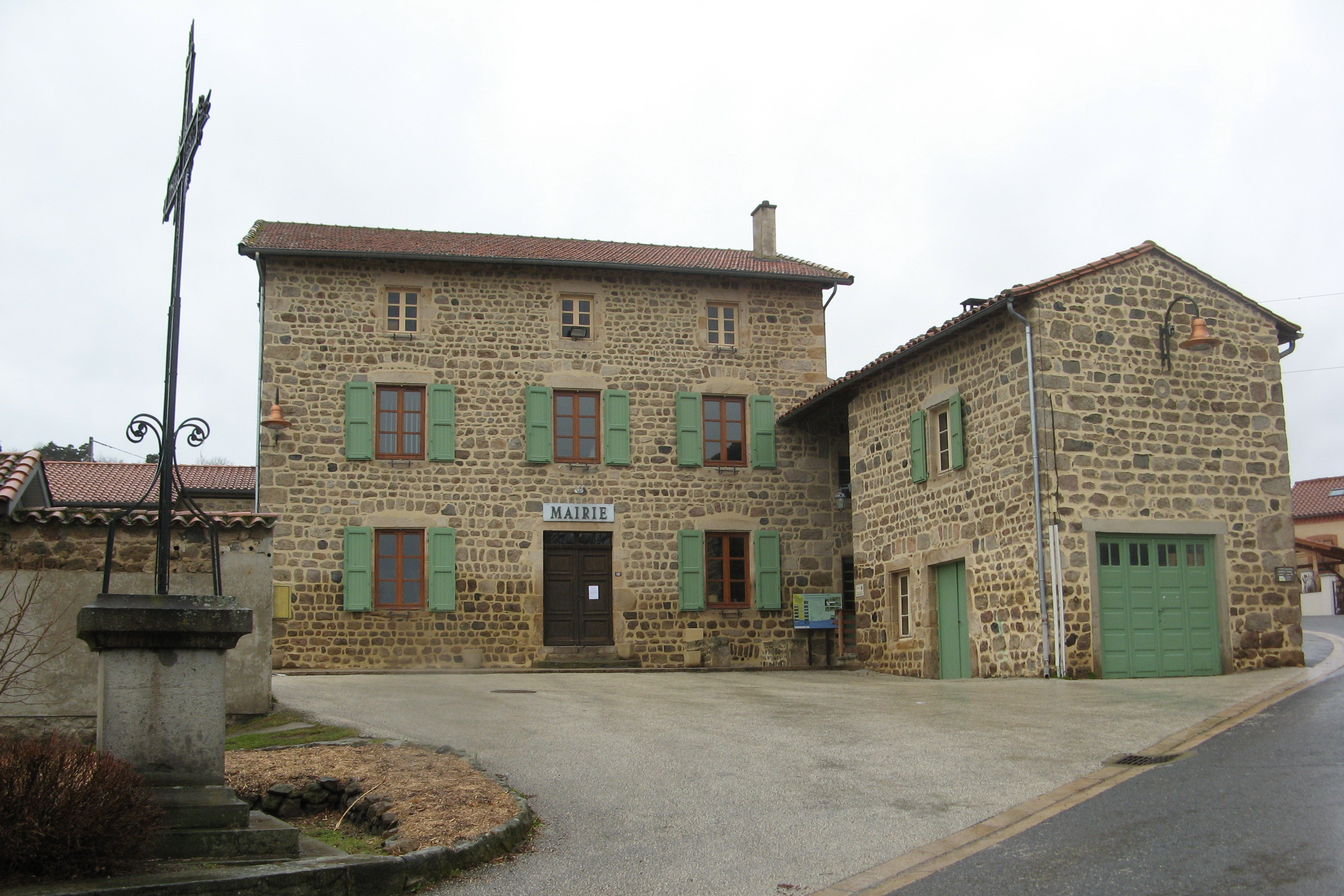
- Town hall

- Coat of arms
- Location of Essertines-en-Châtelneuf
- Location within France Location within Auvergne-Rhône-Alpes
- Coordinates: 45°37′12″N 3°59′55″E
- Country: France
- Region: Auvergne-Rhône-Alpes
- Department: Loire
- Arrondissement: Montbrison
- Canton: Boën-sur-Lignon
- Intercommunality: CA Loire Forez

Government
  - Mayor (2020–2026): Michel Jasleire
- Area^{1}: 15.2 km^{2} (5.9 sq mi)
- Elevation: 700 m (2,300 ft)
- Highest elevation: 1,010 m (3,310 ft)
- Lowest elevation: 444 m (1,457 ft)
- Population (2023): 667
  - Density: 43.9/km^{2} (114/sq mi)
- Time zone: UTC+01:00 (CET)
  - Summer (DST): UTC+02:00 (CEST)
- INSEE/Postal code: 42089 /42600
- ^{1} French Land Register data, which excludes lakes, ponds, glaciers > 1 km^{2} (0.386 sq mi or 247 acres) and river estuaries.

Essertines-en-Châtelneuf (French pronunciation: [esɛʁtin ɑ̃ ʃatɛlnœf]) is a commune in the Loire department in central France.

== Population ==
Historical population
Year	Pop.	±% p.a.
1968	357	—
1975	360	+0.12%
1982	454	+3.37%
1990	521	+1.74%
1999	587	+1.33%
2007	615	+0.58%
2012	669	+1.70%
2017	696	+0.79%
2023	667	−0.71%
Source: INSEE

== See also ==
- Communes of the Loire department
