= Ailleux =

- Commune
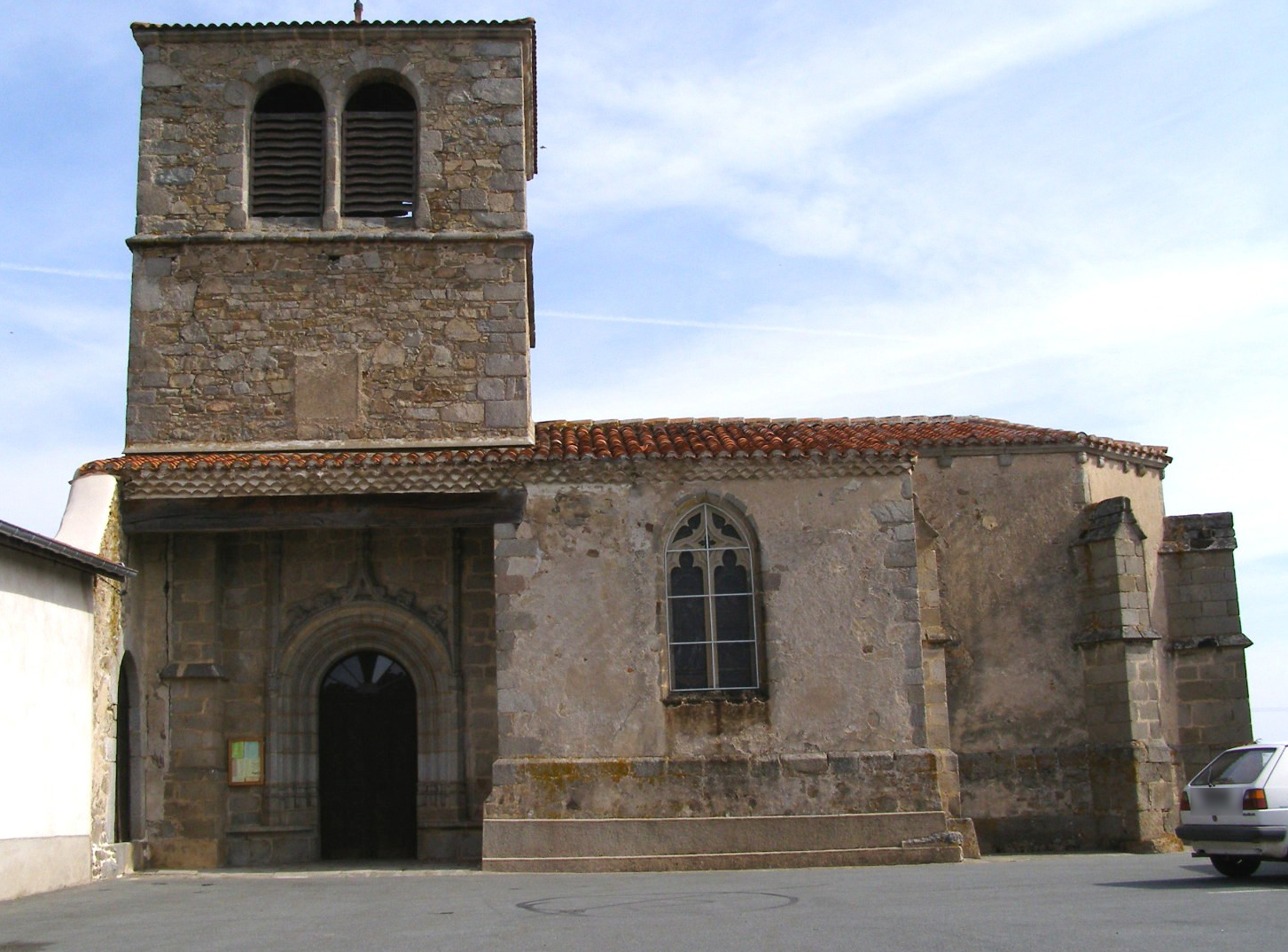

- Coat of arms
- Location of Ailleux
- Location within France Location within Auvergne-Rhône-Alpes
- Coordinates: 45°48′16″N 3°56′36″E
- Country: France
- Region: Auvergne-Rhône-Alpes
- Department: Loire
- Arrondissement: Montbrison
- Canton: Boën-sur-Lignon
- Intercommunality: CA Loire Forez

Government
  - Mayor (2020–2026): Alban Fontenille
- Area^{1}: 9.31 km^{2} (3.59 sq mi)
- Elevation: 700 m (2,300 ft)
- Highest elevation: 722 m (2,369 ft)
- Lowest elevation: 428 m (1,404 ft)
- Population (2023): 175
  - Density: 18.8/km^{2} (48.7/sq mi)
- Time zone: UTC+01:00 (CET)
  - Summer (DST): UTC+02:00 (CEST)
- INSEE/Postal code: 42002 /42130
- ^{1} French Land Register data, which excludes lakes, ponds, glaciers > 1 km^{2} (0.386 sq mi or 247 acres) and river estuaries.

Ailleux (French pronunciation: [ajø]) is a commune in the Loire department in central France.

== Population ==
Historical population
Year	Pop.	±% p.a.
1968	185	—
1975	128	−5.13%
1982	120	−0.92%
1990	134	+1.39%
1999	143	+0.72%
2007	150	+0.60%
2012	148	−0.27%
2017	164	+2.07%
2023	175	+1.09%
Source: INSEE

== See also ==
- Communes of the Loire department
