= Cezay =

- Commune
- Location of Cezay
- Location within France Location within Auvergne-Rhône-Alpes
- Coordinates: 45°48′10″N 3°57′50″E
- Country: France
- Region: Auvergne-Rhône-Alpes
- Department: Loire
- Arrondissement: Montbrison
- Canton: Boën-sur-Lignon
- Intercommunality: CA Loire Forez

Government
  - Mayor (2020–2026): Marie-Thérèse Giry
- Area^{1}: 10.52 km^{2} (4.06 sq mi)
- Elevation: 640 m (2,100 ft)
- Highest elevation: 714 m (2,343 ft)
- Lowest elevation: 419 m (1,375 ft)
- Population (2023): 211
  - Density: 20.1/km^{2} (51.9/sq mi)
- Time zone: UTC+01:00 (CET)
  - Summer (DST): UTC+02:00 (CEST)
- INSEE/Postal code: 42035 /42130
- ^{1} French Land Register data, which excludes lakes, ponds, glaciers > 1 km^{2} (0.386 sq mi or 247 acres) and river estuaries.

Cezay (French pronunciation: [səzɛ]) is a commune in the Loire department in central France.

== Population ==
Historical population
Year	Pop.	±% p.a.
1968	231	—
1975	222	−0.57%
1982	164	−4.23%
1990	171	+0.52%
1999	157	−0.94%
2007	196	+2.81%
2012	200	+0.40%
2017	219	+1.83%
2023	211	−0.62%
Source: INSEE

== See also ==
- Communes of the Loire department
