= Marcilly-le-Châtel =

- Commune
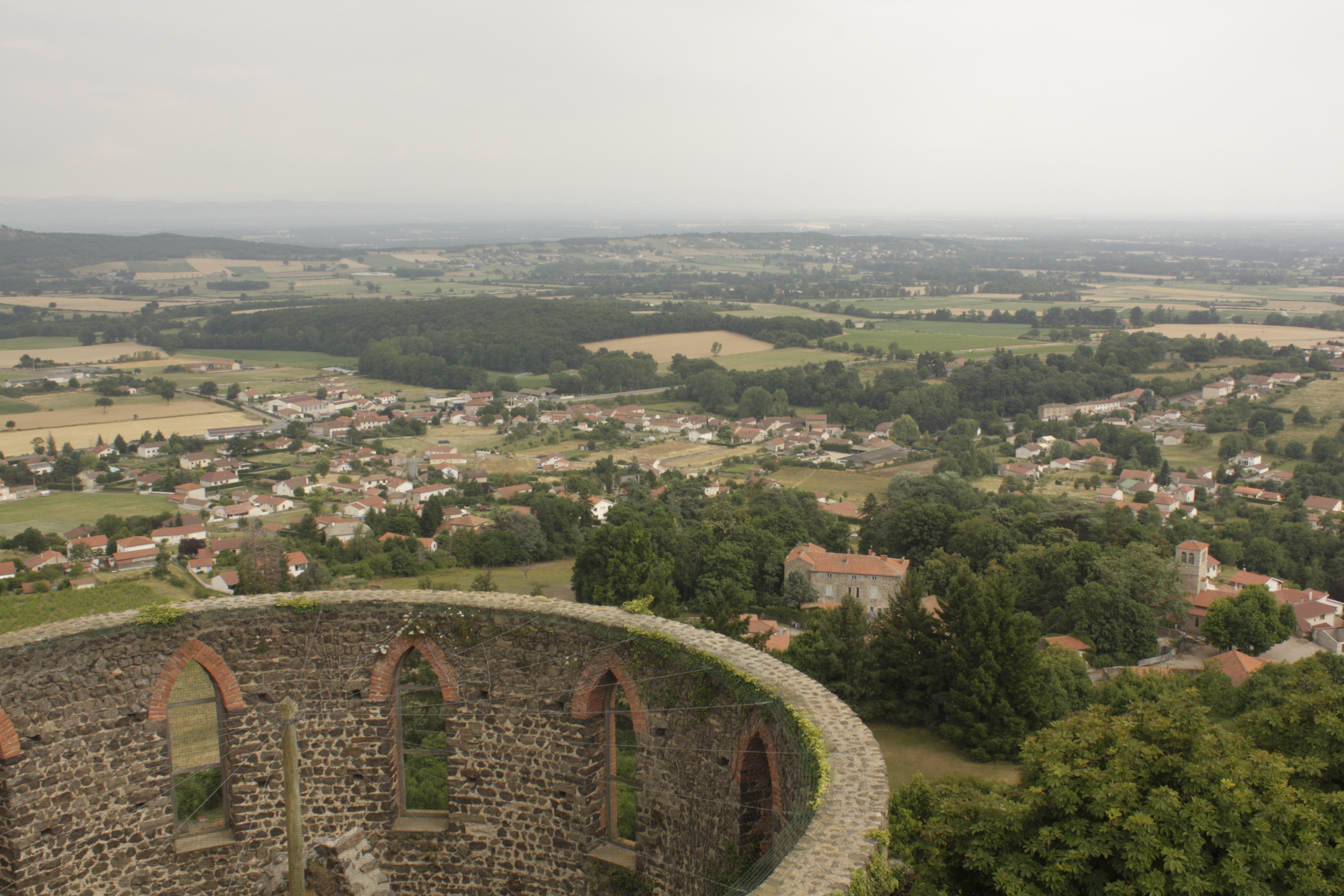
- View of Marcilly-le-Châtel from the chateau

- Coat of arms
- Location of Marcilly-le-Châtel
- Location within France Location within Auvergne-Rhône-Alpes
- Coordinates: 45°41′44″N 4°02′17″E
- Country: France
- Region: Auvergne-Rhône-Alpes
- Department: Loire
- Arrondissement: Montbrison
- Canton: Boën-sur-Lignon
- Intercommunality: CA Loire Forez

Government
  - Mayor (2020–2026): Thierry Gouby
- Area^{1}: 16.32 km^{2} (6.30 sq mi)
- Elevation: 420 m (1,380 ft)
- Highest elevation: 708 m (2,323 ft)
- Lowest elevation: 377 m (1,237 ft)
- Population (2023): 1,401
  - Density: 85.85/km^{2} (222.3/sq mi)
- Time zone: UTC+01:00 (CET)
  - Summer (DST): UTC+02:00 (CEST)
- INSEE/Postal code: 42134 /42130
- ^{1} French Land Register data, which excludes lakes, ponds, glaciers > 1 km^{2} (0.386 sq mi or 247 acres) and river estuaries.

Marcilly-le-Châtel (French pronunciation: [maʁsiji lə ʃɑtɛl]) is a commune in the Loire department in central France.

== Population ==
Historical population
Year	Pop.	±% p.a.
1968	666	—
1975	687	+0.44%
1982	760	+1.45%
1990	856	+1.50%
1999	974	+1.45%
2007	1,202	+2.66%
2012	1,316	+1.83%
2017	1,390	+1.10%
2023	1,401	+0.13%
Source: INSEE

== See also ==
- Communes of the Loire department
