= Champdieu =

Champdieu Chandié (Arpitan)
- Commune
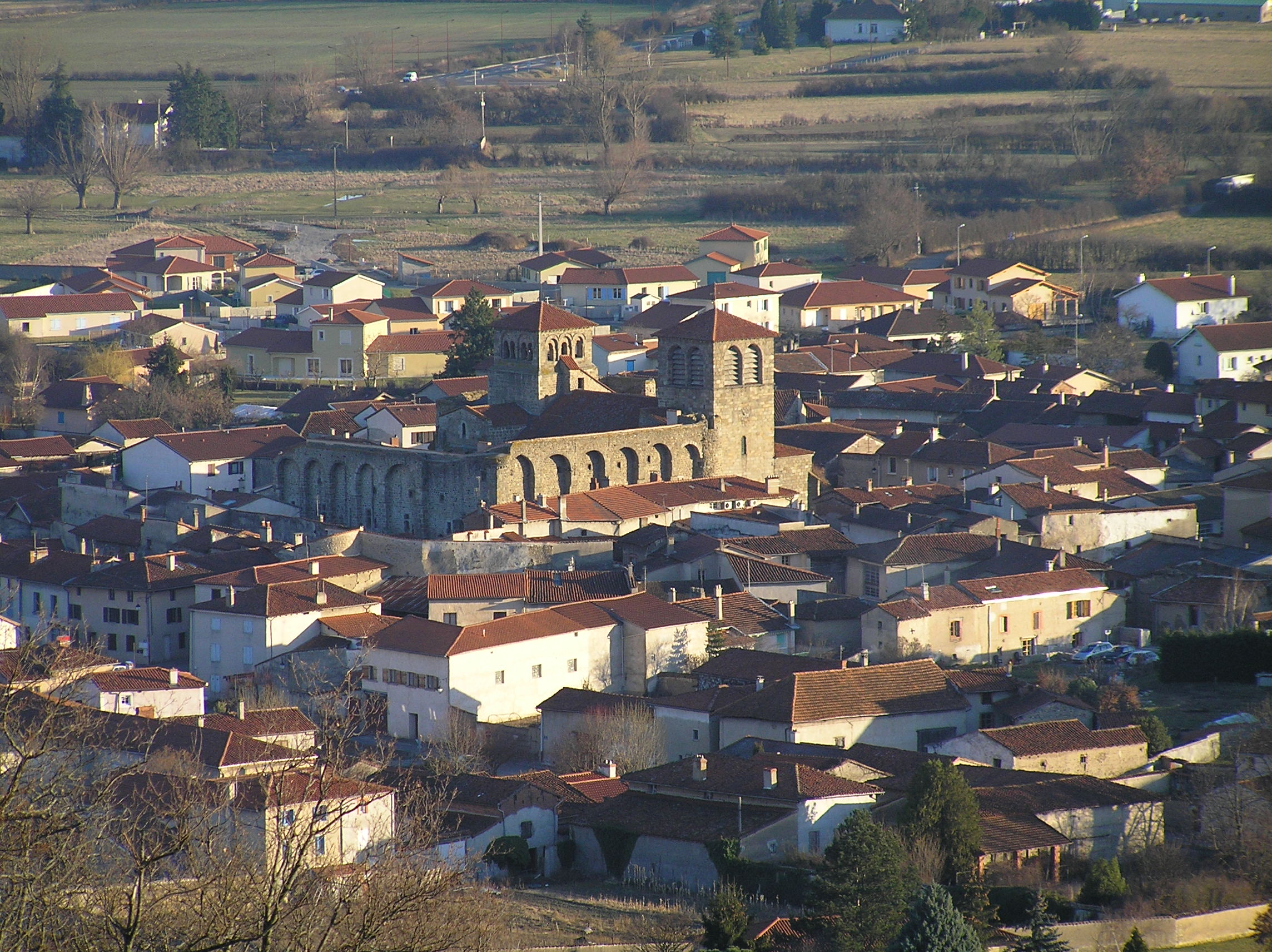

- Coat of arms
- Location of Champdieu
- Location within France Location within Auvergne-Rhône-Alpes
- Coordinates: 45°38′44″N 4°02′46″E
- Country: France
- Region: Auvergne-Rhône-Alpes
- Department: Loire
- Arrondissement: Montbrison
- Canton: Boën-sur-Lignon
- Intercommunality: CA Loire Forez

Government
  - Mayor (2020–2026): Patrice Couchaud
- Area^{1}: 18.2 km^{2} (7.0 sq mi)
- Elevation: 398 m (1,306 ft)
- Highest elevation: 727 m (2,385 ft)
- Lowest elevation: 363 m (1,191 ft)
- Population (2023): 2,064
  - Density: 113/km^{2} (294/sq mi)
- Time zone: UTC+01:00 (CET)
  - Summer (DST): UTC+02:00 (CEST)
- INSEE/Postal code: 42046 /42600
- ^{1} French Land Register data, which excludes lakes, ponds, glaciers > 1 km^{2} (0.386 sq mi or 247 acres) and river estuaries.

Champdieu (French pronunciation: [ʃɑ̃djø]; Arpitan: Chandié [ʃã.ˈdʒi]) is a commune in the Loire department in central France.

== History ==
The village developed around a Benedictine priory, established in the 9th or 10th century. The priory church and three sides of the adjacent cloister have been preserved.

== Population ==
Historical population
Year	Pop.	±% p.a.
1968	858	—
1975	1,120	+3.88%
1982	1,291	+2.05%
1990	1,355	+0.61%
1999	1,471	+0.92%
2007	1,627	+1.27%
2012	1,751	+1.48%
2017	1,919	+1.85%
2023	2,064	+1.22%
Source: INSEE

== See also ==
- Communes of the Loire department
