= Saint-Martin-la-Sauveté =

- Commune
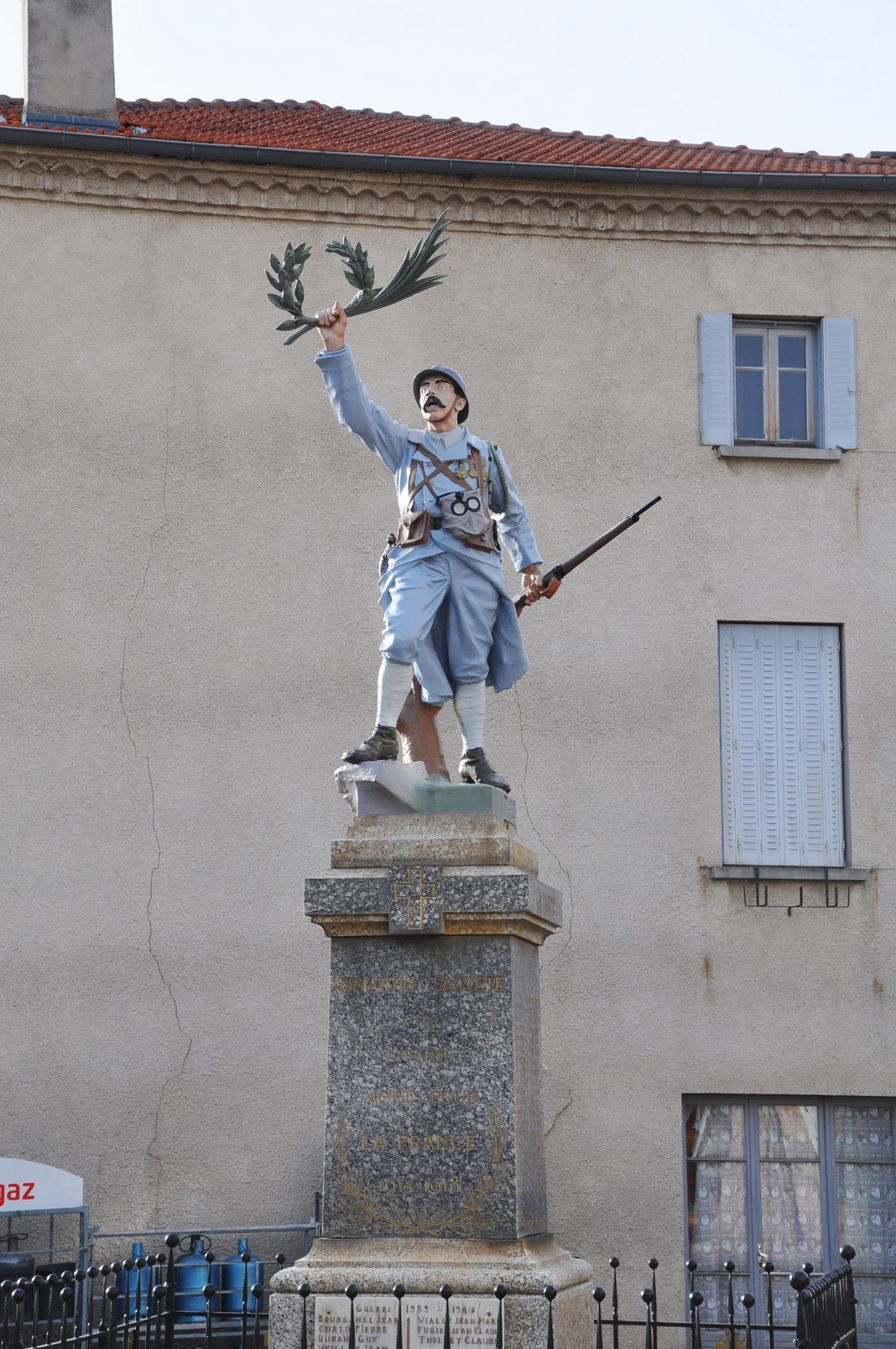
- War memorial
- Location of Saint-Martin-la-Sauveté
- Location within France Location within Auvergne-Rhône-Alpes
- Coordinates: 45°50′01″N 3°55′28″E
- Country: France
- Region: Auvergne-Rhône-Alpes
- Department: Loire
- Arrondissement: Roanne
- Canton: Boën-sur-Lignon
- Intercommunality: Vals d'Aix et d'Isable

Government
  - Mayor (2020–2026): Marius Daval
- Area^{1}: 29.74 km^{2} (11.48 sq mi)
- Elevation: 643 m (2,110 ft)
- Highest elevation: 889 m (2,917 ft)
- Lowest elevation: 396 m (1,299 ft)
- Population (2023): 889
  - Density: 29.9/km^{2} (77.4/sq mi)
- Time zone: UTC+01:00 (CET)
  - Summer (DST): UTC+02:00 (CEST)
- INSEE/Postal code: 42260 /42260
- ^{1} French Land Register data, which excludes lakes, ponds, glaciers > 1 km^{2} (0.386 sq mi or 247 acres) and river estuaries.

Saint-Martin-la-Sauveté (French pronunciation: [sɛ̃ maʁtɛ̃ la sovte]) is a commune in the Loire department in central France.

== Population ==
Historical population
Year	Pop.	±% p.a.
1968	973	—
1975	912	−0.92%
1982	895	−0.27%
1990	909	+0.19%
1999	898	−0.14%
2007	956	+0.79%
2012	984	+0.58%
2017	955	−0.60%
2023	889	−1.19%
Source: INSEE

== Twin towns ==
Saint-Martin-la-Sauveté is twinned with:

- Agbande, Togo, since 1997

== See also ==
- Communes of the Loire department
