= Saint-Just-en-Bas =

- Commune
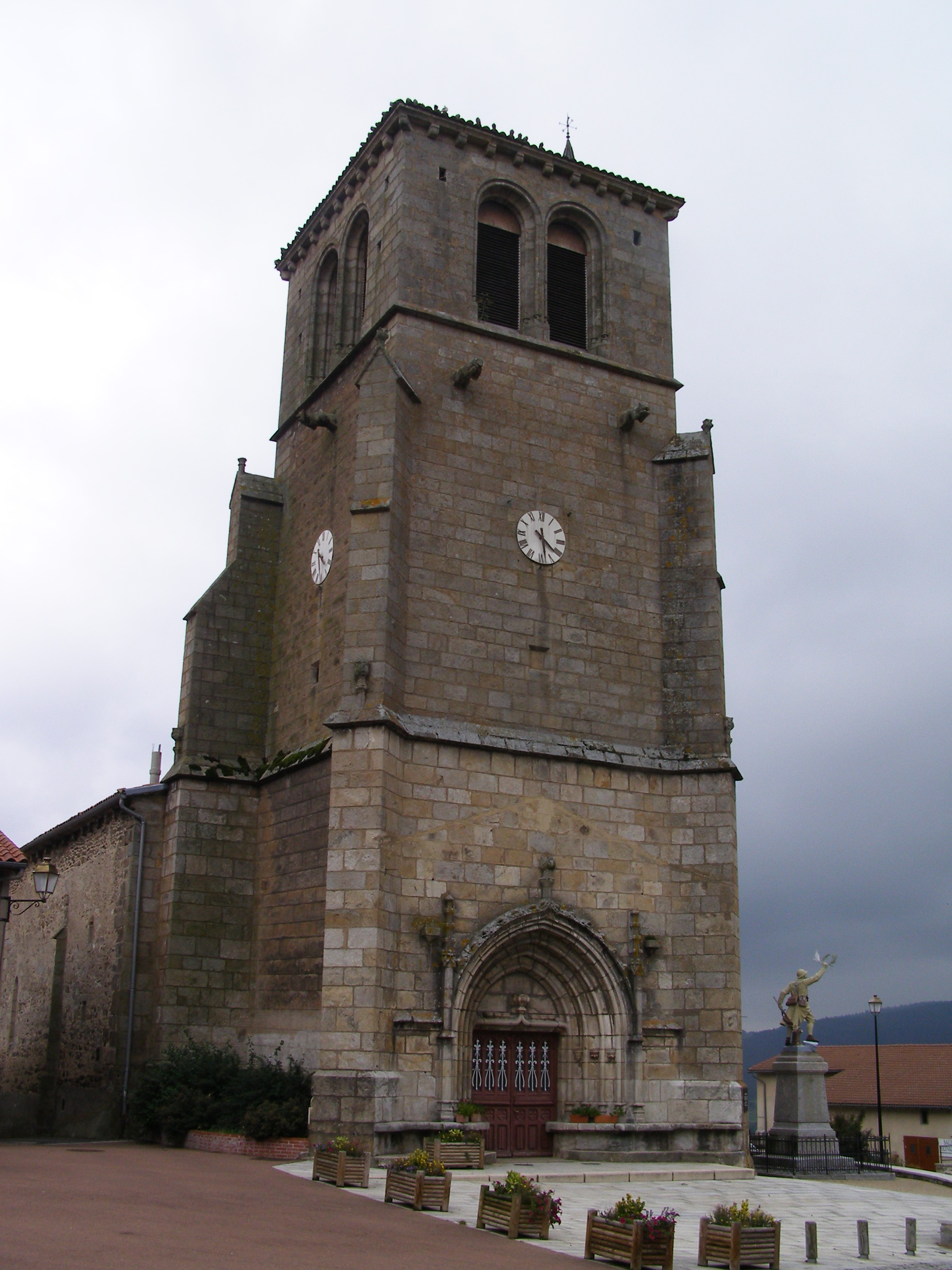
- Location of Saint-Just-en-Bas
- Location within France Location within Auvergne-Rhône-Alpes
- Coordinates: 45°43′54″N 3°52′53″E
- Country: France
- Region: Auvergne-Rhône-Alpes
- Department: Loire
- Arrondissement: Montbrison
- Canton: Boën-sur-Lignon
- Intercommunality: CA Loire Forez

Government
  - Mayor (2020–2026): Paul Duchampt
- Area^{1}: 20.95 km^{2} (8.09 sq mi)
- Elevation: 830 m (2,720 ft)
- Highest elevation: 1,174 m (3,852 ft)
- Lowest elevation: 670 m (2,200 ft)
- Population (2023): 281
  - Density: 13.4/km^{2} (34.7/sq mi)
- Time zone: UTC+01:00 (CET)
  - Summer (DST): UTC+02:00 (CEST)
- INSEE/Postal code: 42247 /42990
- ^{1} French Land Register data, which excludes lakes, ponds, glaciers > 1 km^{2} (0.386 sq mi or 247 acres) and river estuaries.

Saint-Just-en-Bas (French pronunciation: [sɛ̃ ʒy(st) ɑ̃ ba]) is a commune in the Loire department in central France.

== Populations ==
Historical population
Year	Pop.	±% p.a.
1968	507	—
1975	414	−2.85%
1982	368	−1.67%
1990	328	−1.43%
1999	317	−0.38%
2007	311	−0.24%
2012	301	−0.65%
2017	289	−0.81%
2023	281	−0.47%
Source: INSEE

== See also ==
- Communes of the Loire department
