= Bully, Loire =

Bully
- Commune
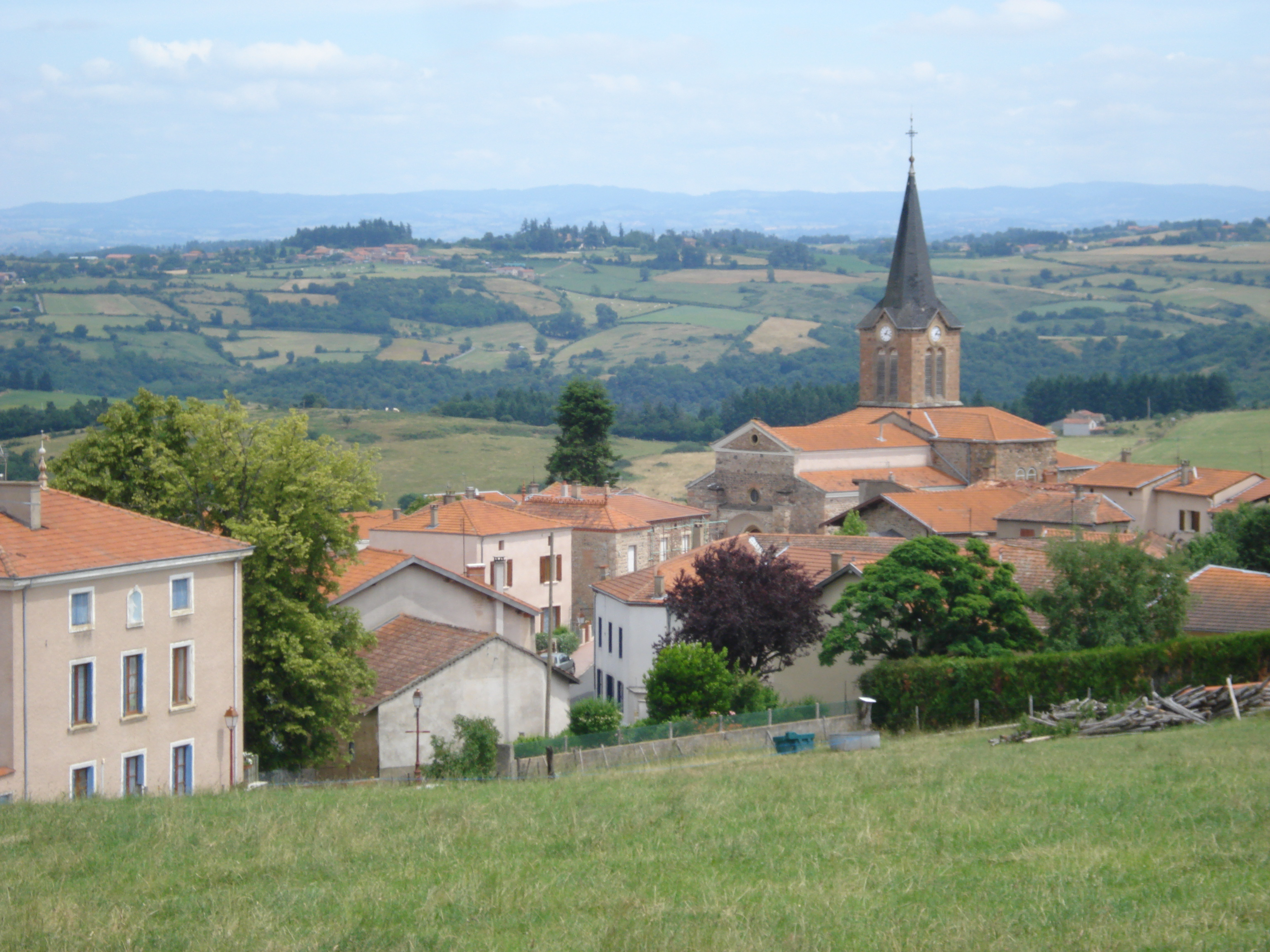

- Coat of arms
- Location of Bully
- Location within France Location within Auvergne-Rhône-Alpes
- Coordinates: 45°55′42″N 4°00′20″E
- Country: France
- Region: Auvergne-Rhône-Alpes
- Department: Loire
- Arrondissement: Roanne
- Canton: Boën-sur-Lignon
- Intercommunality: Vals d'Aix et d'Isable

Government
  - Mayor (2020–2026): Dominique Mayère
- Area^{1}: 19.03 km^{2} (7.35 sq mi)
- Elevation: 436 m (1,430 ft)
- Highest elevation: 733 m (2,405 ft)
- Lowest elevation: 281 m (922 ft)
- Population (2023): 451
  - Density: 23.7/km^{2} (61.4/sq mi)
- Time zone: UTC+01:00 (CET)
  - Summer (DST): UTC+02:00 (CEST)
- INSEE/Postal code: 42027 /42260
- ^{1} French Land Register data, which excludes lakes, ponds, glaciers > 1 km^{2} (0.386 sq mi or 247 acres) and river estuaries.

Bully (French pronunciation: [byli]) is a commune in the Loire department in central France.

== Population ==
Historical population
Year	Pop.	±% p.a.
1968	318	—
1975	270	−2.31%
1982	252	−0.98%
1990	269	+0.82%
1999	298	+1.14%
2007	382	+3.15%
2012	415	+1.67%
2017	408	−0.34%
2023	451	+1.68%
Source: INSEE

== See also ==
- Communes of the Loire department
