= Saint-Georges-en-Couzan =

- Commune
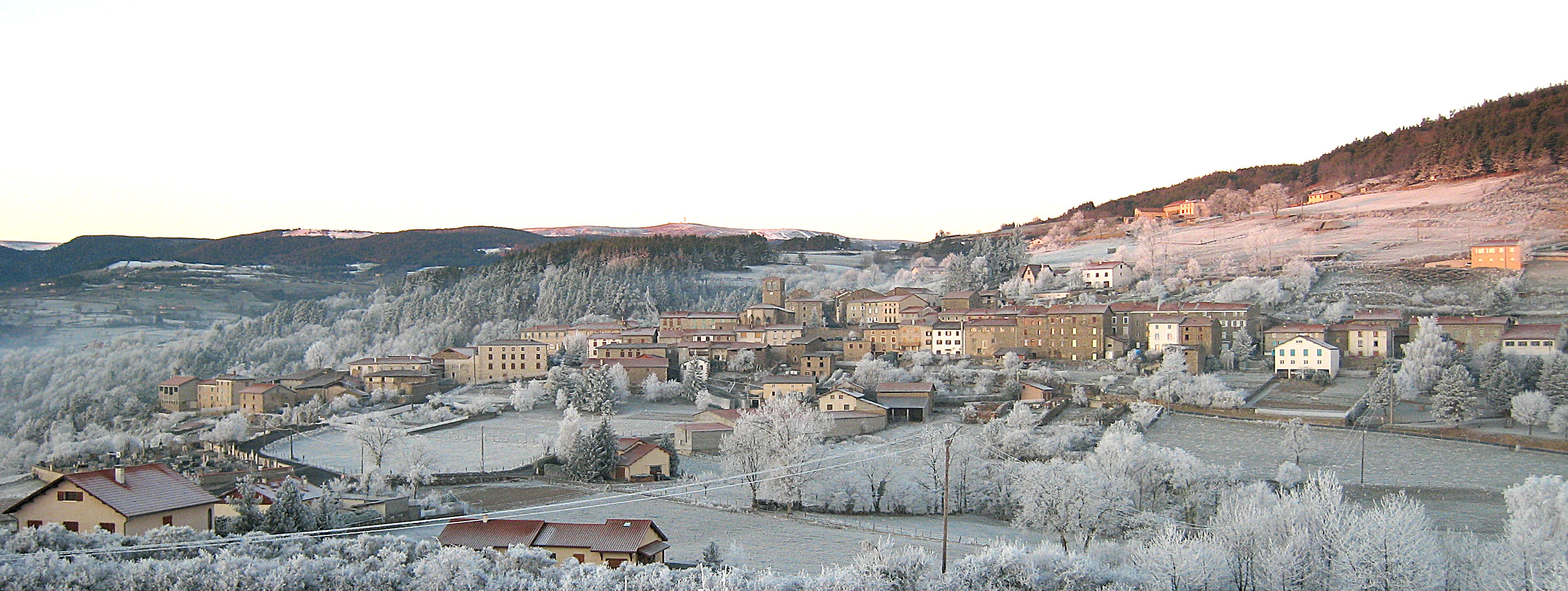

- Coat of arms
- Location of Saint-Georges-en-Couzan
- Location within France Location within Auvergne-Rhône-Alpes
- Coordinates: 45°42′06″N 3°55′55″E
- Country: France
- Region: Auvergne-Rhône-Alpes
- Department: Loire
- Arrondissement: Montbrison
- Canton: Boën-sur-Lignon
- Intercommunality: CA Loire Forez

Government
  - Mayor (2020–2026): David Buisson
- Area^{1}: 2,364 km^{2} (913 sq mi)
- Elevation: 700 m (2,300 ft)
- Highest elevation: 1,134 m (3,720 ft)
- Lowest elevation: 452 m (1,483 ft)
- Population (2023): 430
  - Density: 0.18/km^{2} (0.47/sq mi)
- Time zone: UTC+01:00 (CET)
  - Summer (DST): UTC+02:00 (CEST)
- INSEE/Postal code: 42227 /42990
- ^{1} French Land Register data, which excludes lakes, ponds, glaciers > 1 km^{2} (0.386 sq mi or 247 acres) and river estuaries.

Saint-Georges-en-Couzan (French pronunciation: [sɛ̃ ʒɔʁʒ ɑ̃ kuzɑ̃]; Arpitan: Sant-Jôrjo-en-Cosan) is a commune in the Loire department in central France.

== Geography ==
The river Lignon du Forez flows through the commune.

== Population ==
Historical population
Year	Pop.	±% p.a.
1968	631	—
1975	591	−0.93%
1982	579	−0.29%
1990	539	−0.89%
1999	460	−1.75%
2007	424	−1.01%
2012	418	−0.28%
2017	420	+0.10%
2023	430	+0.39%
Source: INSEE

== See also ==
- Communes of the Loire department
