= Luré =

- Commune
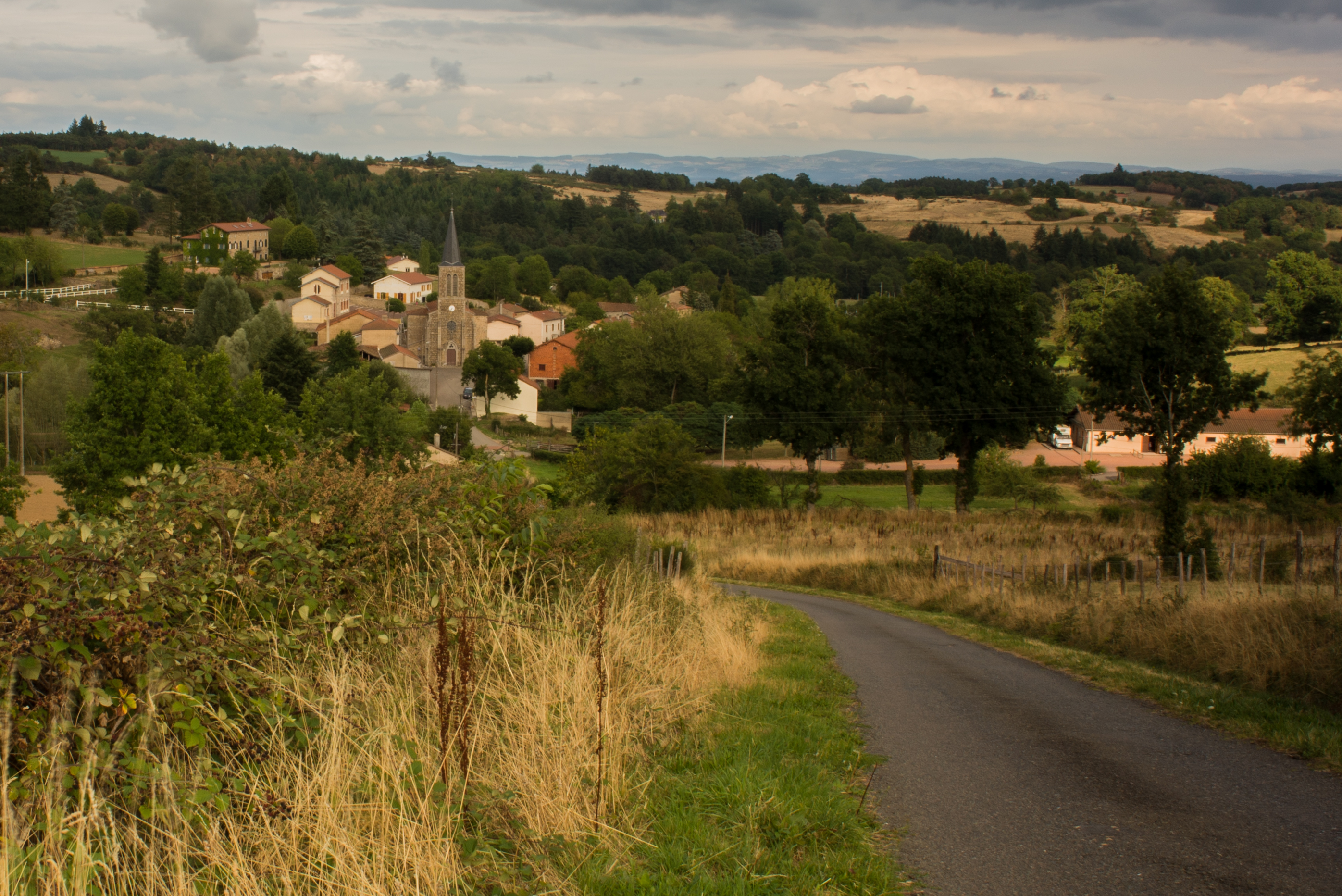
- Location of Luré
- Location within France Location within Auvergne-Rhône-Alpes
- Coordinates: 45°52′56″N 3°56′16″E
- Country: France
- Region: Auvergne-Rhône-Alpes
- Department: Loire
- Arrondissement: Roanne
- Canton: Boën-sur-Lignon
- Intercommunality: Vals d'Aix et d'Isable

Government
  - Mayor (2023–2026): Michel Barge
- Area^{1}: 6.23 km^{2} (2.41 sq mi)
- Elevation: 550 m (1,800 ft)
- Highest elevation: 681 m (2,234 ft)
- Lowest elevation: 510 m (1,670 ft)
- Population (2023): 136
  - Density: 21.8/km^{2} (56.5/sq mi)
- Time zone: UTC+01:00 (CET)
  - Summer (DST): UTC+02:00 (CEST)
- INSEE/Postal code: 42125 /42260
- ^{1} French Land Register data, which excludes lakes, ponds, glaciers > 1 km^{2} (0.386 sq mi or 247 acres) and river estuaries.

Luré (French pronunciation: [lyʁe]) is a commune in the Loire department in central France.

== Population ==
Historical population
Year	Pop.	±% p.a.
1968	201	—
1975	164	−2.86%
1982	183	+1.58%
1990	154	−2.13%
1999	143	−0.82%
2007	144	+0.09%
2012	149	+0.68%
2017	142	−0.96%
2023	136	−0.72%
Source: INSEE

== See also ==
- Communes of the Loire department
