= Palogneux =

- Commune
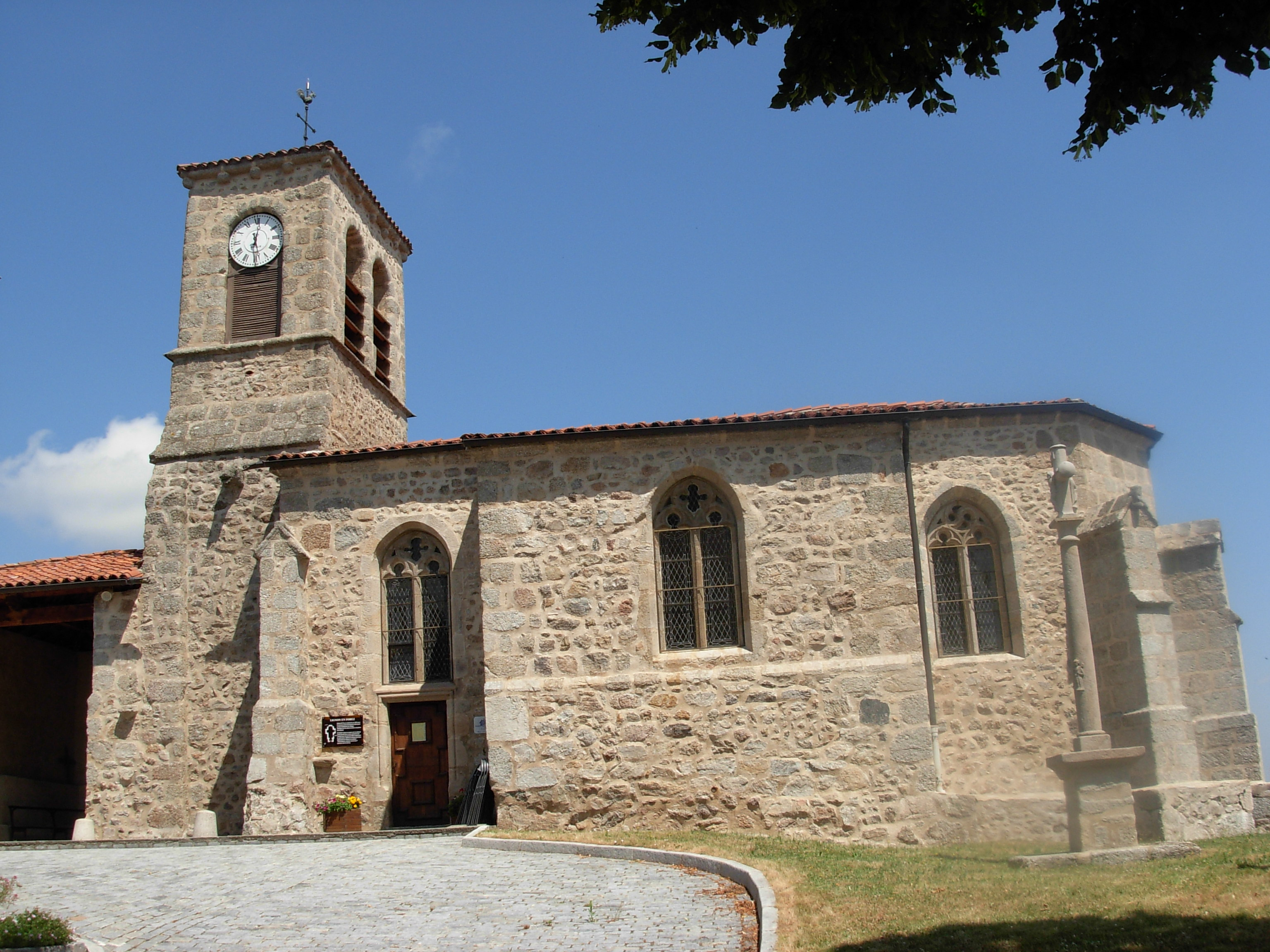

- Coat of arms
- Location of Palogneux
- Location within France Location within Auvergne-Rhône-Alpes
- Coordinates: 45°44′41″N 3°55′15″E
- Country: France
- Region: Auvergne-Rhône-Alpes
- Department: Loire
- Arrondissement: Montbrison
- Canton: Boën-sur-Lignon
- Intercommunality: CA Loire Forez

Government
  - Mayor (2020–2026): Gérard Barou
- Area^{1}: 7.01 km^{2} (2.71 sq mi)
- Elevation: 800 m (2,600 ft)
- Highest elevation: 945 m (3,100 ft)
- Lowest elevation: 496 m (1,627 ft)
- Population (2023): 69
  - Density: 9.8/km^{2} (25/sq mi)
- Time zone: UTC+01:00 (CET)
  - Summer (DST): UTC+02:00 (CEST)
- INSEE/Postal code: 42164 /42990
- ^{1} French Land Register data, which excludes lakes, ponds, glaciers > 1 km^{2} (0.386 sq mi or 247 acres) and river estuaries.

Palogneux (French pronunciation: [palɔɲø]) is a commune in the Loire department in central France.

== Population ==
Historical population
| Year | Pop. | ±% p.a. |
|---|---|---|
| 1968 | 122 | — |
| 1975 | 90 | −4.25% |
| 1982 | 63 | −4.97% |
| 1990 | 60 | −0.61% |
| 1999 | 52 | −1.58% |
| 2007 | 51 | −0.24% |
| 2012 | 80 | +9.42% |
| 2017 | 78 | −0.51% |
| 2023 | 69 | −2.02% |
Source: INSEE

== See also ==
- Communes of the Loire department
