= Saint-Georges-de-Baroille =

- Commune
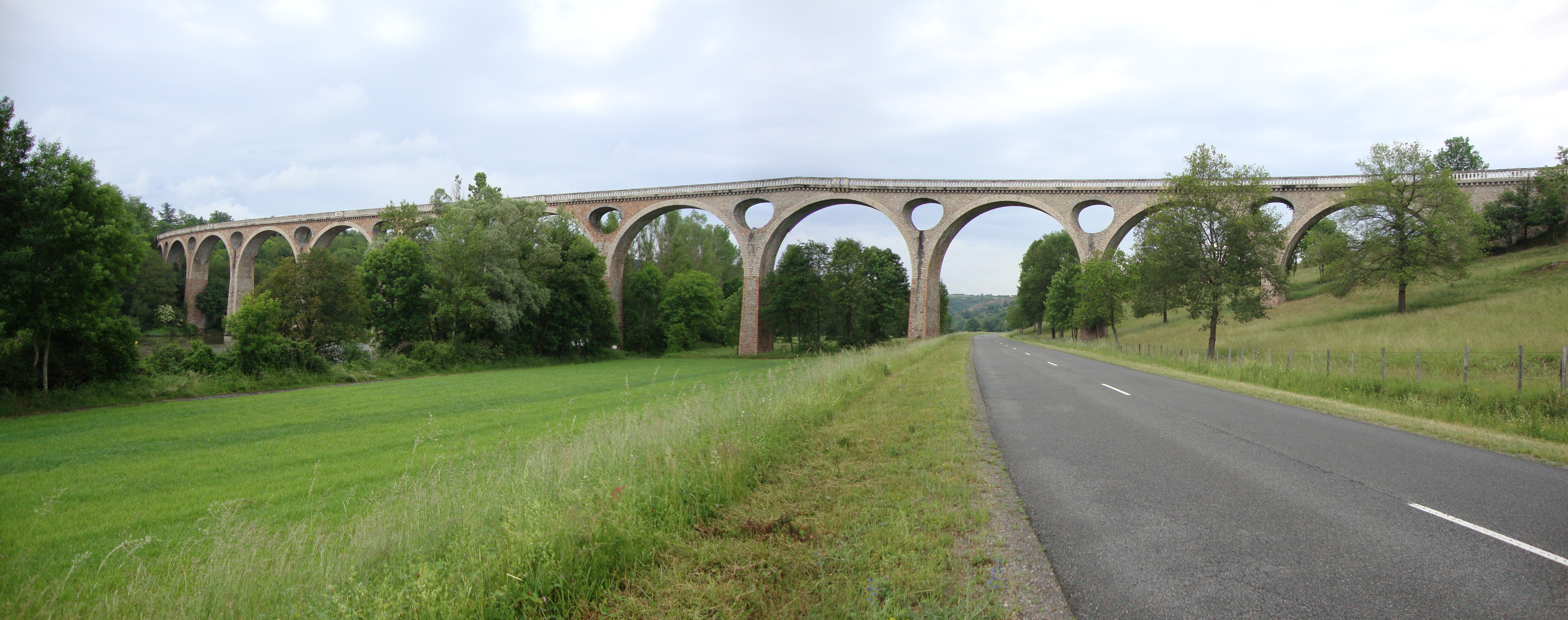
- Chessieux Viaduct
- Location of Saint-Georges-de-Baroille
- Location within France Location within Auvergne-Rhône-Alpes
- Coordinates: 45°51′01″N 4°07′55″E
- Country: France
- Region: Auvergne-Rhône-Alpes
- Department: Loire
- Arrondissement: Roanne
- Canton: Boën-sur-Lignon
- Intercommunality: Vals d'Aix et d'Isable

Government
  - Mayor (2020–2026): Ludovic Bouttet
- Area^{1}: 15.24 km^{2} (5.88 sq mi)
- Elevation: 390 m (1,280 ft)
- Highest elevation: 416 m (1,365 ft)
- Lowest elevation: 304 m (997 ft)
- Population (2023): 460
  - Density: 30/km^{2} (78/sq mi)
- Time zone: UTC+01:00 (CET)
  - Summer (DST): UTC+02:00 (CEST)
- INSEE/Postal code: 42226 /42510
- ^{1} French Land Register data, which excludes lakes, ponds, glaciers > 1 km^{2} (0.386 sq mi or 247 acres) and river estuaries.

Saint-Georges-de-Baroille (French pronunciation: [sɛ̃ ʒɔʁʒ də baʁwaj]) is a commune in the Loire department in central France.

== Population ==
Historical population
Year	Pop.	±% p.a.
1968	231	—
1975	206	−1.62%
1982	260	+3.38%
1990	282	+1.02%
1999	281	−0.04%
2007	302	+0.90%
2012	369	+4.09%
2017	419	+2.57%
2023	460	+1.57%
Source: INSEE

== See also ==
- Communes of the Loire department
