= Saint-Polgues =

- Commune
- Coat of arms
- Location of Saint-Polgues
- Location within France Location within Auvergne-Rhône-Alpes
- Coordinates: 45°54′47″N 3°58′33″E
- Country: France
- Region: Auvergne-Rhône-Alpes
- Department: Loire
- Arrondissement: Roanne
- Canton: Boën-sur-Lignon
- Intercommunality: Vals d'Aix et d'Isable

Government
  - Mayor (2024–2026): Josette Gardant
- Area^{1}: 5.77 km^{2} (2.23 sq mi)
- Elevation: 600 m (2,000 ft)
- Highest elevation: 644 m (2,113 ft)
- Lowest elevation: 453 m (1,486 ft)
- Population (2023): 277
  - Density: 48.0/km^{2} (124/sq mi)
- Time zone: UTC+01:00 (CET)
  - Summer (DST): UTC+02:00 (CEST)
- INSEE/Postal code: 42274 /42260
- ^{1} French Land Register data, which excludes lakes, ponds, glaciers > 1 km^{2} (0.386 sq mi or 247 acres) and river estuaries.

Saint-Polgues (French pronunciation: [sɛ̃ pɔlɡ]) is a commune in the Loire department in central France.

== Population ==
Historical population
Year	Pop.	±% p.a.
1968	196	—
1975	191	−0.37%
1982	197	+0.44%
1990	182	−0.99%
1999	194	+0.71%
2007	220	+1.58%
2012	243	+2.01%
2017	259	+1.28%
2023	277	+1.13%
Source: INSEE

== See also ==
- Communes of the Loire department
