= Pommiers-en-Forez =

- Commune
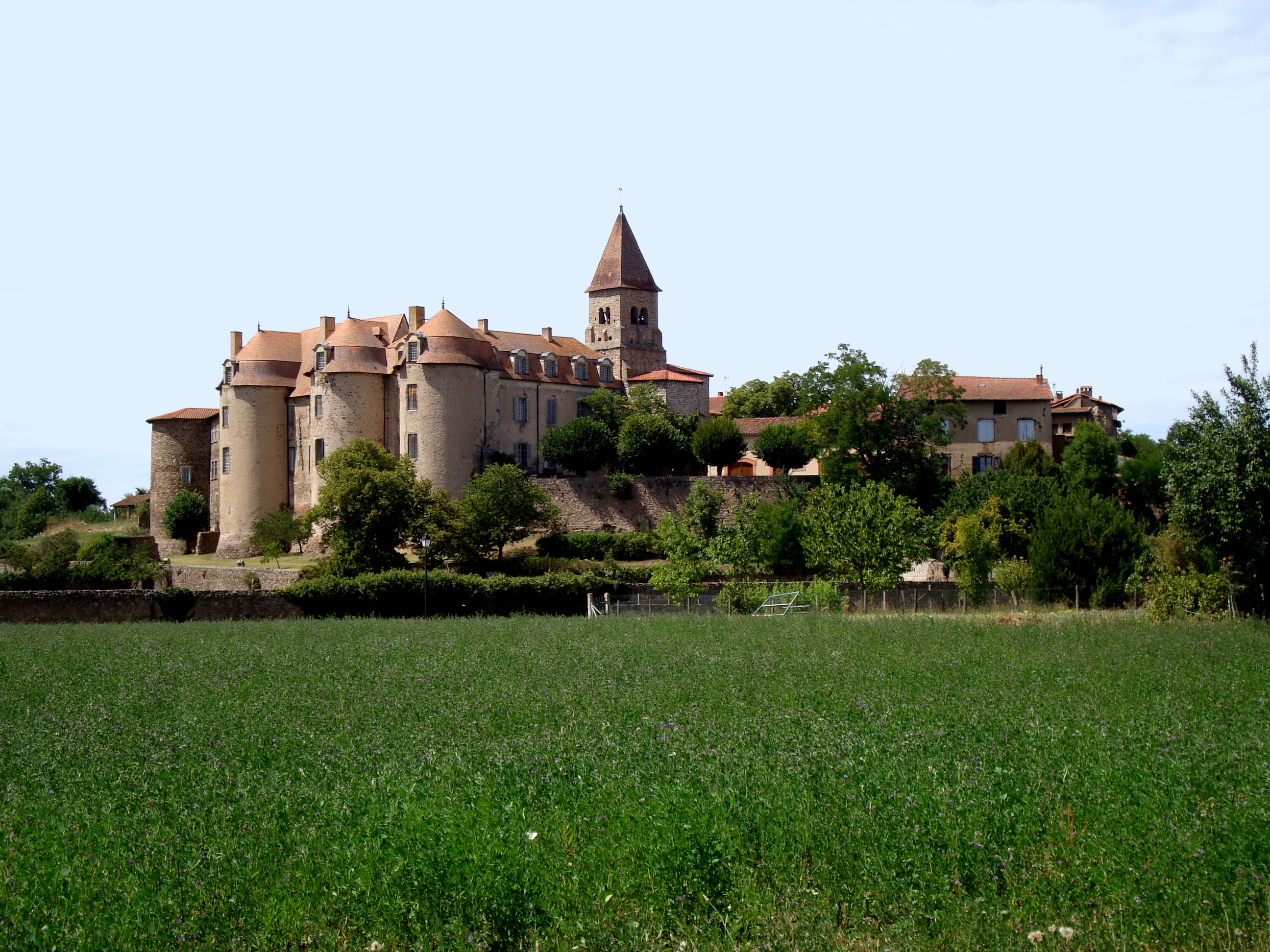
- Priory

- Coat of arms
- Location of Pommiers-en-Forez
- Location within France Location within Auvergne-Rhône-Alpes
- Coordinates: 45°49′48″N 4°03′57″E
- Country: France
- Region: Auvergne-Rhône-Alpes
- Department: Loire
- Arrondissement: Roanne
- Canton: Boën-sur-Lignon
- Intercommunality: Vals d'Aix et d'Isable

Government
  - Mayor (2024–2026): Pascal Leleu
- Area^{1}: 23.84 km^{2} (9.20 sq mi)
- Elevation: 350 m (1,150 ft)
- Highest elevation: 408 m (1,339 ft)
- Lowest elevation: 318 m (1,043 ft)
- Population (2023): 378
  - Density: 15.9/km^{2} (41.1/sq mi)
- Time zone: UTC+01:00 (CET)
  - Summer (DST): UTC+02:00 (CEST)
- INSEE/Postal code: 42173 /42260
- ^{1} French Land Register data, which excludes lakes, ponds, glaciers > 1 km^{2} (0.386 sq mi or 247 acres) and river estuaries.

Pommiers-en-Forez (French pronunciation: [pɔmje ɑ̃ fɔʁɛ], literally Pommiers in Forez; before 2020: Pommiers) is a commune in the Loire department in central France.

== Population ==
Historical population
Year	Pop.	±% p.a.
1968	410	—
1975	322	−3.39%
1982	323	+0.04%
1990	296	−1.09%
1999	374	+2.63%
2007	385	+0.36%
2012	369	−0.85%
2017	359	−0.55%
2023	378	+0.86%
Source: INSEE

== See also ==
- Communes of the Loire department
