= Nollieux =

Nollieux Noualyœ (Arpitan)
- Commune
- Location of Nollieux
- Location within France Location within Auvergne-Rhône-Alpes
- Coordinates: 45°49′02″N 3°59′52″E
- Country: France
- Region: Auvergne-Rhône-Alpes
- Department: Loire
- Arrondissement: Roanne
- Canton: Boën-sur-Lignon
- Intercommunality: Vals d'Aix et d'Isable

Government
  - Mayor (2020–2026): Maxime Fleury
- Area^{1}: 6.95 km^{2} (2.68 sq mi)
- Elevation: 510 m (1,670 ft)
- Highest elevation: 612 m (2,008 ft)
- Lowest elevation: 389 m (1,276 ft)
- Population (2023): 184
  - Density: 26.5/km^{2} (68.6/sq mi)
- Time zone: UTC+01:00 (CET)
  - Summer (DST): UTC+02:00 (CEST)
- INSEE/Postal code: 42160 /42260
- ^{1} French Land Register data, which excludes lakes, ponds, glaciers > 1 km^{2} (0.386 sq mi or 247 acres) and river estuaries.

Nollieux (French pronunciation: [nɔljø]; Arpitan: Noualyœ [nwa.ˈʎø]) is a commune in the Loire department in central France.

== Population ==
Historical population
Year	Pop.	±% p.a.
1968	193	—
1975	173	−1.55%
1982	174	+0.08%
1990	146	−2.17%
1999	133	−1.03%
2007	146	+1.17%
2012	170	+3.09%
2017	197	+2.99%
2023	184	−1.13%
Source: INSEE

== See also ==
- Communes of the Loire department
