= Souternon =

- Commune
- Coat of arms
- Location of Souternon
- Location within France Location within Auvergne-Rhône-Alpes
- Coordinates: 45°52′12″N 3°59′18″E
- Country: France
- Region: Auvergne-Rhône-Alpes
- Department: Loire
- Arrondissement: Roanne
- Canton: Boën-sur-Lignon
- Intercommunality: Vals d'Aix et d'Isable

Government
  - Mayor (2020–2026): Paul Petitbout
- Area^{1}: 17.05 km^{2} (6.58 sq mi)
- Elevation: 510 m (1,670 ft)
- Highest elevation: 581 m (1,906 ft)
- Lowest elevation: 383 m (1,257 ft)
- Population (2023): 293
  - Density: 17.2/km^{2} (44.5/sq mi)
- Time zone: UTC+01:00 (CET)
  - Summer (DST): UTC+02:00 (CEST)
- INSEE/Postal code: 42303 /42260
- ^{1} French Land Register data, which excludes lakes, ponds, glaciers > 1 km^{2} (0.386 sq mi or 247 acres) and river estuaries.

Souternon (French pronunciation: [sutɛʁnɔ̃]) is a commune in the Loire department in central France.

== Population ==
Historical population
Year	Pop.	±% p.a.
1968	444	—
1975	419	−0.82%
1982	363	−2.03%
1990	378	+0.51%
1999	310	−2.18%
2007	326	+0.63%
2012	305	−1.32%
2017	288	−1.14%
2023	293	+0.29%
Source: INSEE

== See also ==
- Communes of the Loire department
