= Saint-Julien-d'Oddes =

- Commune
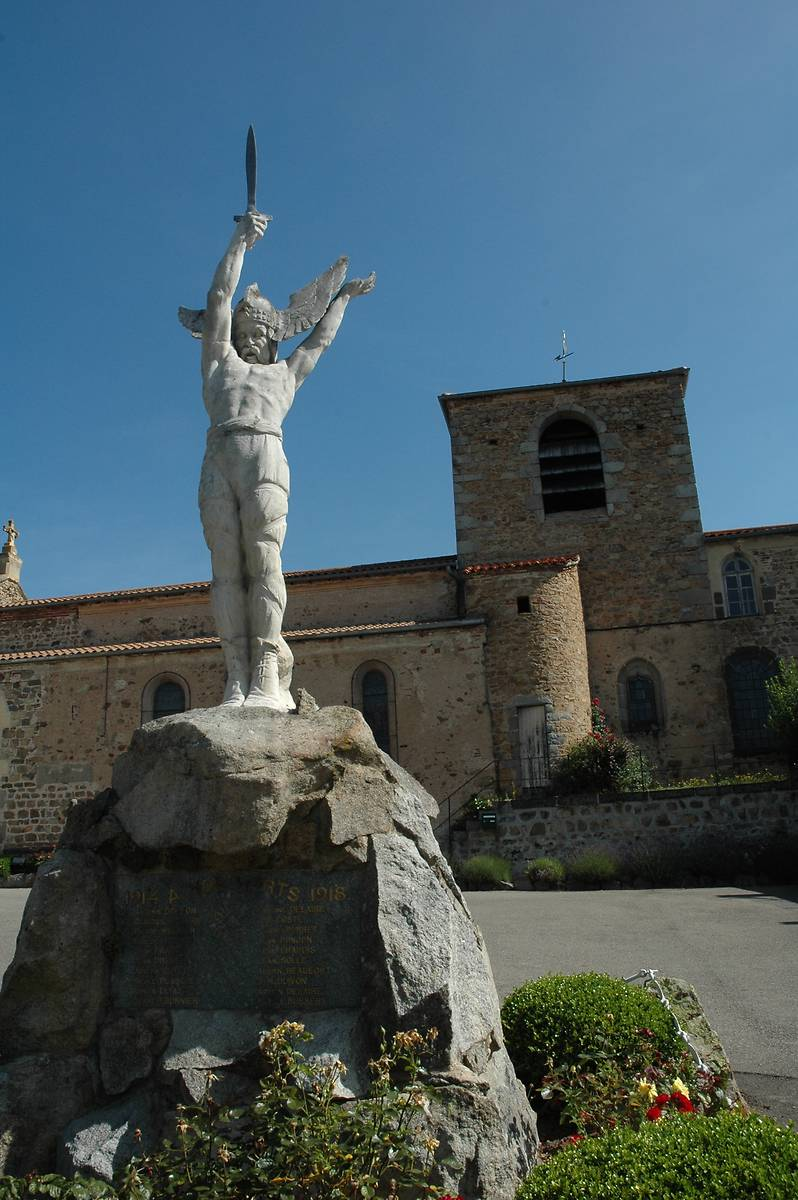
- Location of Saint-Julien-d'Oddes
- Location within France Location within Auvergne-Rhône-Alpes
- Coordinates: 45°50′56″N 3°59′49″E
- Country: France
- Region: Auvergne-Rhône-Alpes
- Department: Loire
- Arrondissement: Roanne
- Canton: Boën-sur-Lignon
- Intercommunality: Vals d'Aix et d'Isable

Government
  - Mayor (2020–2026): Christian Bray
- Area^{1}: 10.41 km^{2} (4.02 sq mi)
- Elevation: 490 m (1,610 ft)
- Highest elevation: 560 m (1,840 ft)
- Lowest elevation: 384 m (1,260 ft)
- Population (2023): 300
  - Density: 29/km^{2} (75/sq mi)
- Time zone: UTC+01:00 (CET)
  - Summer (DST): UTC+02:00 (CEST)
- INSEE/Postal code: 42243 /42260
- ^{1} French Land Register data, which excludes lakes, ponds, glaciers > 1 km^{2} (0.386 sq mi or 247 acres) and river estuaries.

Saint-Julien-d'Oddes (French pronunciation: [sɛ̃ ʒyljɛ̃ dɔd]; Arpitan: Sant-Julien-d’Ôdes) is a commune in the Loire department in central France.

== Population ==
Historical population
Year	Pop.	±% p.a.
1968	275	—
1975	217	−3.33%
1982	248	+1.93%
1990	252	+0.20%
1999	258	+0.26%
2007	251	−0.34%
2012	271	+1.55%
2017	272	+0.07%
2023	300	+1.65%
Source: INSEE

== See also ==
- Communes of the Loire department
