= Saint-Jean-la-Vêtre =

- Commune
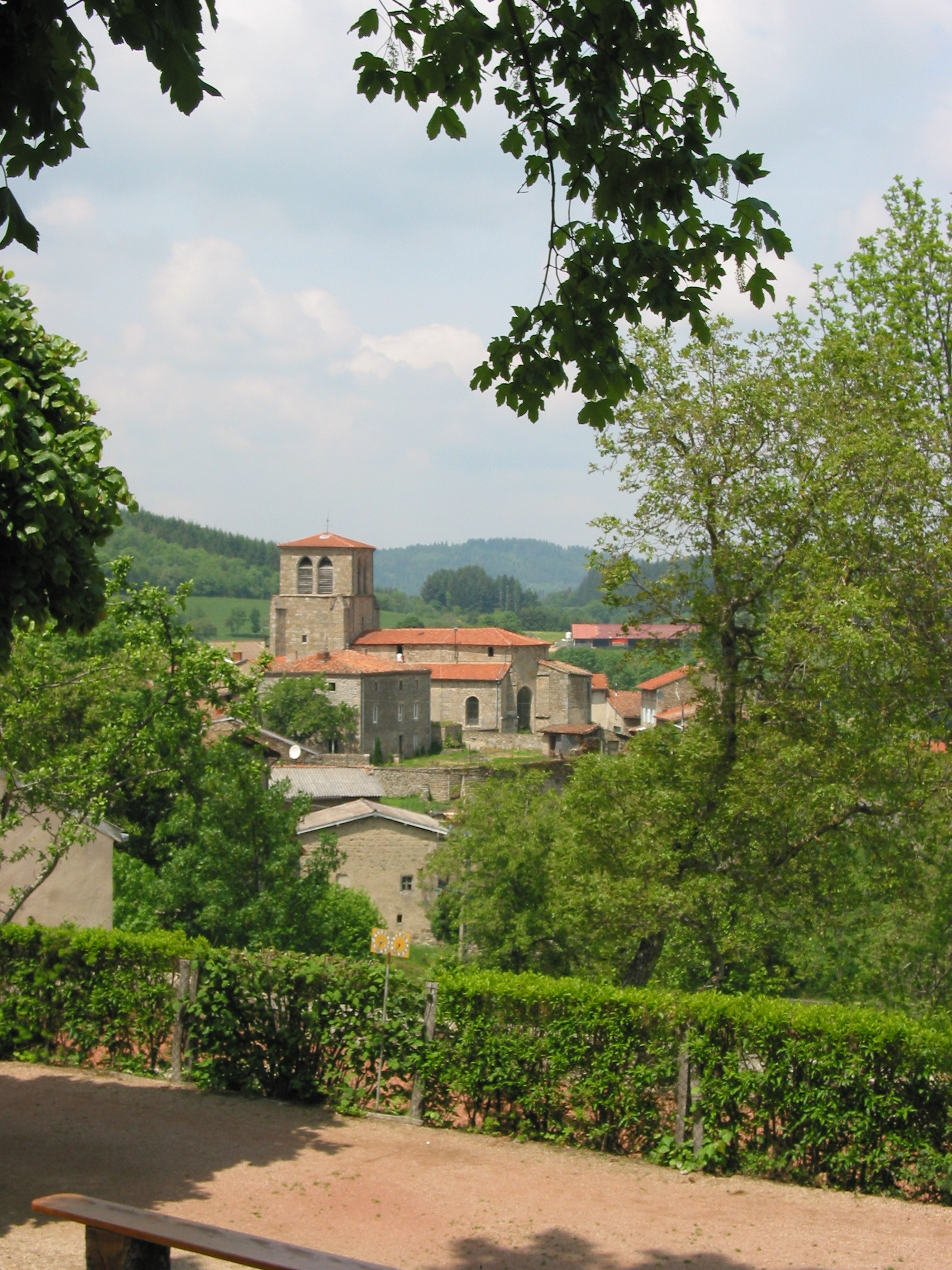

- Coat of arms
- Location of Saint-Jean-la-Vêtre
- Location within France Location within Auvergne-Rhône-Alpes
- Coordinates: 45°47′24″N 3°48′22″E
- Country: France
- Region: Auvergne-Rhône-Alpes
- Department: Loire
- Arrondissement: Montbrison
- Canton: Boën-sur-Lignon
- Intercommunality: CA Loire Forez

Government
  - Mayor (2020–2026): Jean-Luc Daval-Pommier
- Area^{1}: 16.22 km^{2} (6.26 sq mi)
- Elevation: 670 m (2,200 ft)
- Highest elevation: 1,296 m (4,252 ft)
- Lowest elevation: 654 m (2,146 ft)
- Population (2023): 303
  - Density: 18.7/km^{2} (48.4/sq mi)
- Time zone: UTC+01:00 (CET)
  - Summer (DST): UTC+02:00 (CEST)
- INSEE/Postal code: 42238 /42440
- ^{1} French Land Register data, which excludes lakes, ponds, glaciers > 1 km^{2} (0.386 sq mi or 247 acres) and river estuaries.

Saint-Jean-la-Vêtre (French pronunciation: [sɛ̃ ʒɑ̃ la vɛtʁ]; Arpitan: Sent-Jian-Lavètre) is a commune in the Loire department in central France.

== Population ==
Historical population
Year	Pop.	±% p.a.
1968	477	—
1975	405	−2.31%
1982	381	−0.87%
1990	338	−1.49%
1999	387	+1.52%
2007	352	−1.18%
2012	340	−0.69%
2017	316	−1.45%
2023	303	−0.70%
Source: INSEE

== See also ==
- Communes of the Loire department
