= Châtelneuf, Loire =

Châtelneuf
- Commune
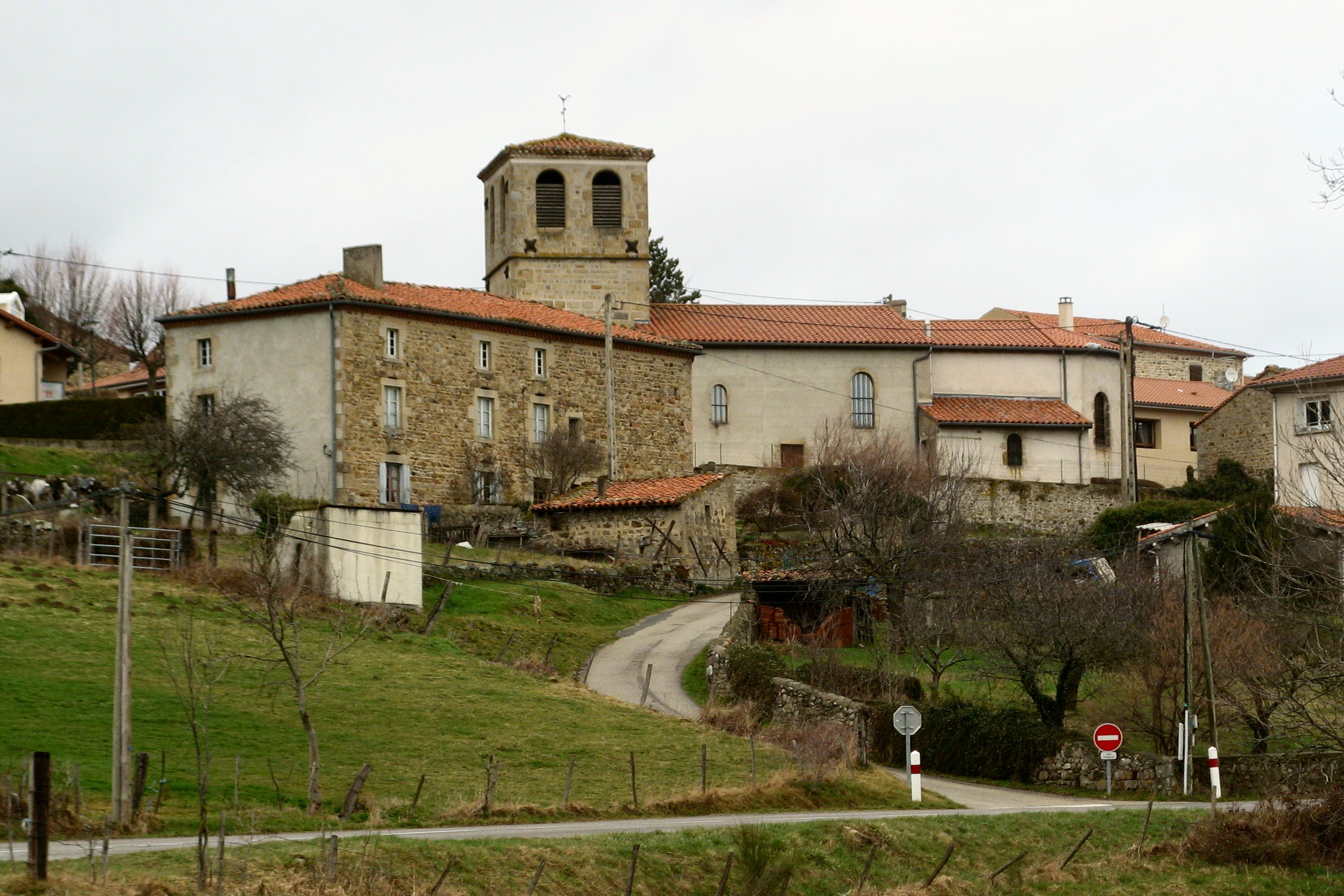
- Location of Châtelneuf
- Location within France Location within Auvergne-Rhône-Alpes
- Coordinates: 45°38′19″N 3°59′02″E
- Country: France
- Region: Auvergne-Rhône-Alpes
- Department: Loire
- Arrondissement: Montbrison
- Canton: Boën-sur-Lignon
- Intercommunality: CA Loire Forez

Government
  - Mayor (2020–2026): Marc Pelardy
- Area^{1}: 8.48 km^{2} (3.27 sq mi)
- Elevation: 830 m (2,720 ft)
- Highest elevation: 1,110 m (3,640 ft)
- Lowest elevation: 498 m (1,634 ft)
- Population (2023): 354
  - Density: 41.7/km^{2} (108/sq mi)
- Time zone: UTC+01:00 (CET)
  - Summer (DST): UTC+02:00 (CEST)
- INSEE/Postal code: 42054 /42940
- ^{1} French Land Register data, which excludes lakes, ponds, glaciers > 1 km^{2} (0.386 sq mi or 247 acres) and river estuaries.

Châtelneuf (French pronunciation: [ʃatɛlnœf]) is a commune in the Loire department in central France.

== Population ==
Historical population
Year	Pop.	±% p.a.
1968	209	—
1975	195	−0.99%
1982	209	+1.00%
1990	240	+1.74%
1999	259	+0.85%
2007	319	+2.64%
2012	320	+0.06%
2017	335	+0.92%
2023	354	+0.92%
Source: INSEE

== See also ==
- Communes of the Loire department
