= Grézolles =

- Commune
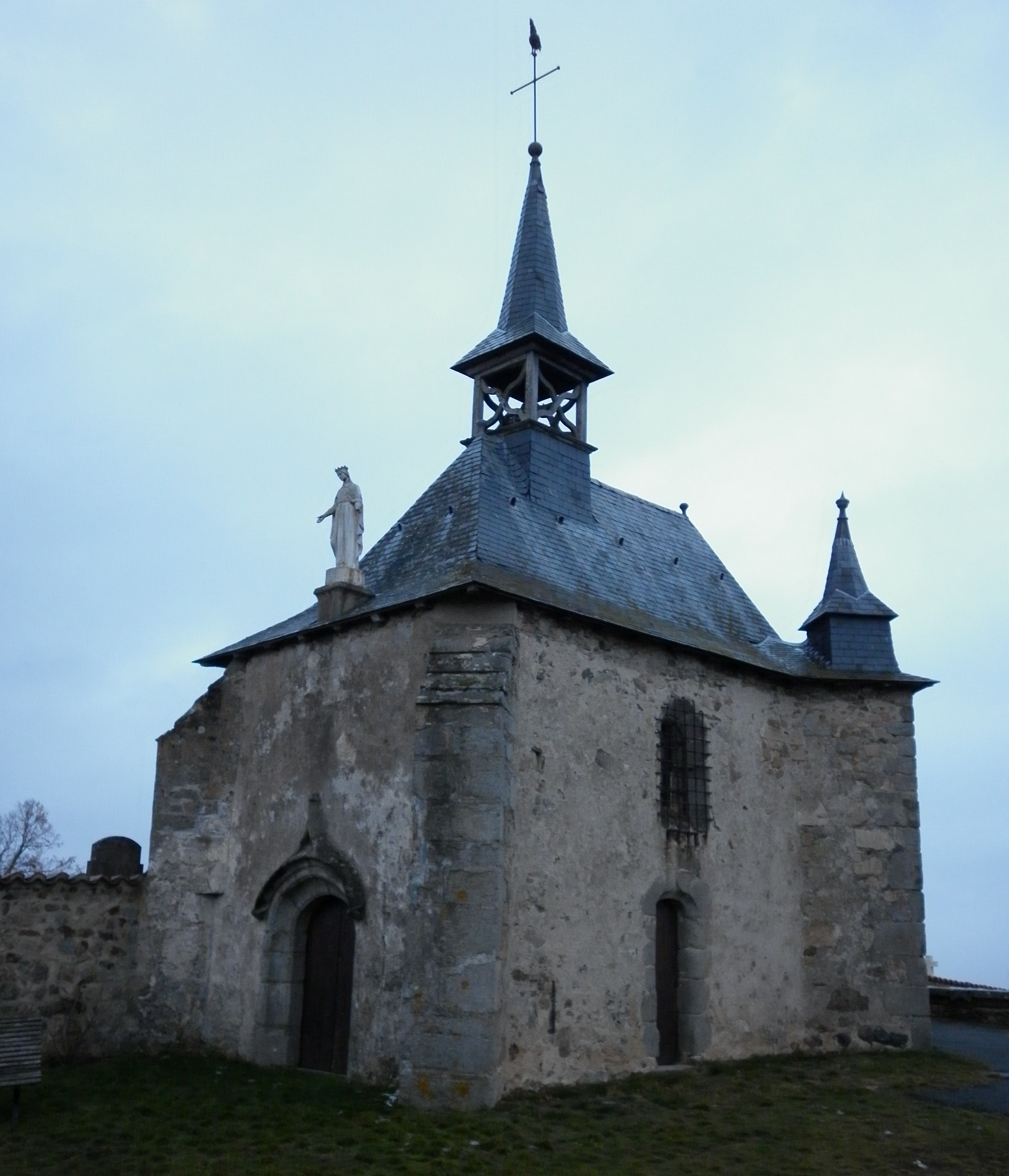
- Saint Barbara chapel

- Coat of arms
- Location of Grézolles
- Location within France Location within Auvergne-Rhône-Alpes
- Coordinates: 45°51′50″N 3°57′07″E
- Country: France
- Region: Auvergne-Rhône-Alpes
- Department: Loire
- Arrondissement: Roanne
- Canton: Boën-sur-Lignon

Government
  - Mayor (2020–2026): Françoise Clément
- Area^{1}: 5.6 km^{2} (2.2 sq mi)
- Elevation: 570 m (1,870 ft)
- Highest elevation: 611 m (2,005 ft)
- Lowest elevation: 453 m (1,486 ft)
- Population (2023): 235
  - Density: 42/km^{2} (110/sq mi)
- Time zone: UTC+01:00 (CET)
  - Summer (DST): UTC+02:00 (CEST)
- INSEE/Postal code: 42106 /42260
- ^{1} French Land Register data, which excludes lakes, ponds, glaciers > 1 km^{2} (0.386 sq mi or 247 acres) and river estuaries.

Grézolles (French pronunciation: [ɡʁezɔl]) is a commune in the Loire department in central France.

== Population ==
Historical population
Year	Pop.	±% p.a.
1968	312	—
1975	304	−0.37%
1982	273	−1.52%
1990	250	−1.09%
1999	228	−1.02%
2007	279	+2.56%
2012	286	+0.50%
2017	267	−1.37%
2023	235	−2.11%
Source: INSEE

== See also ==
- Communes of the Loire department
