= La Chambonie =

- Commune
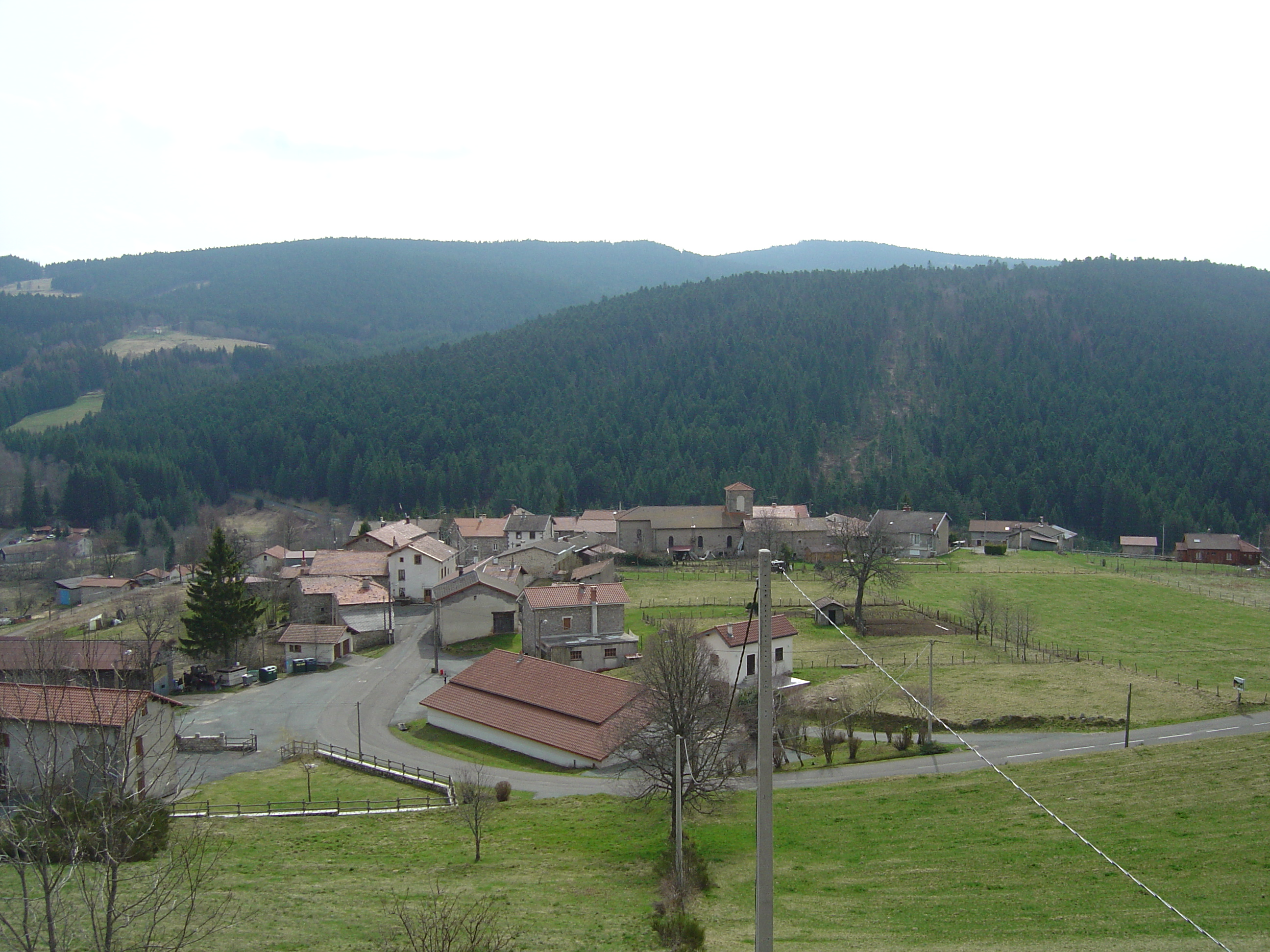
- Location of La Chambonie
- Location within France Location within Auvergne-Rhône-Alpes
- Coordinates: 45°44′53″N 3°44′58″E
- Country: France
- Region: Auvergne-Rhône-Alpes
- Department: Loire
- Arrondissement: Montbrison
- Canton: Boën-sur-Lignon
- Intercommunality: CA Loire Forez

Government
  - Mayor (2020–2026): François Forchez
- Area^{1}: 4.42 km^{2} (1.71 sq mi)
- Elevation: 1,020 m (3,350 ft)
- Highest elevation: 1,383 m (4,537 ft)
- Lowest elevation: 940 m (3,080 ft)
- Population (2023): 39
  - Density: 8.8/km^{2} (23/sq mi)
- Time zone: UTC+01:00 (CET)
  - Summer (DST): UTC+02:00 (CEST)
- INSEE/Postal code: 42045 /42440
- ^{1} French Land Register data, which excludes lakes, ponds, glaciers > 1 km^{2} (0.386 sq mi or 247 acres) and river estuaries.

La Chambonie (French pronunciation: [la ʃɑ̃bɔni]) is a commune in the Loire department in central France.

== Population ==
Historical population
Year	Pop.	±% p.a.
1968	102	—
1975	81	−3.24%
1982	79	−0.36%
1990	55	−4.43%
1999	46	−1.97%
2007	60	+3.38%
2012	51	−3.20%
2017	42	−3.81%
2023	39	−1.23%
Source: INSEE

== See also ==
- Communes of the Loire department
