= Saint-Priest-la-Vêtre =

- Commune
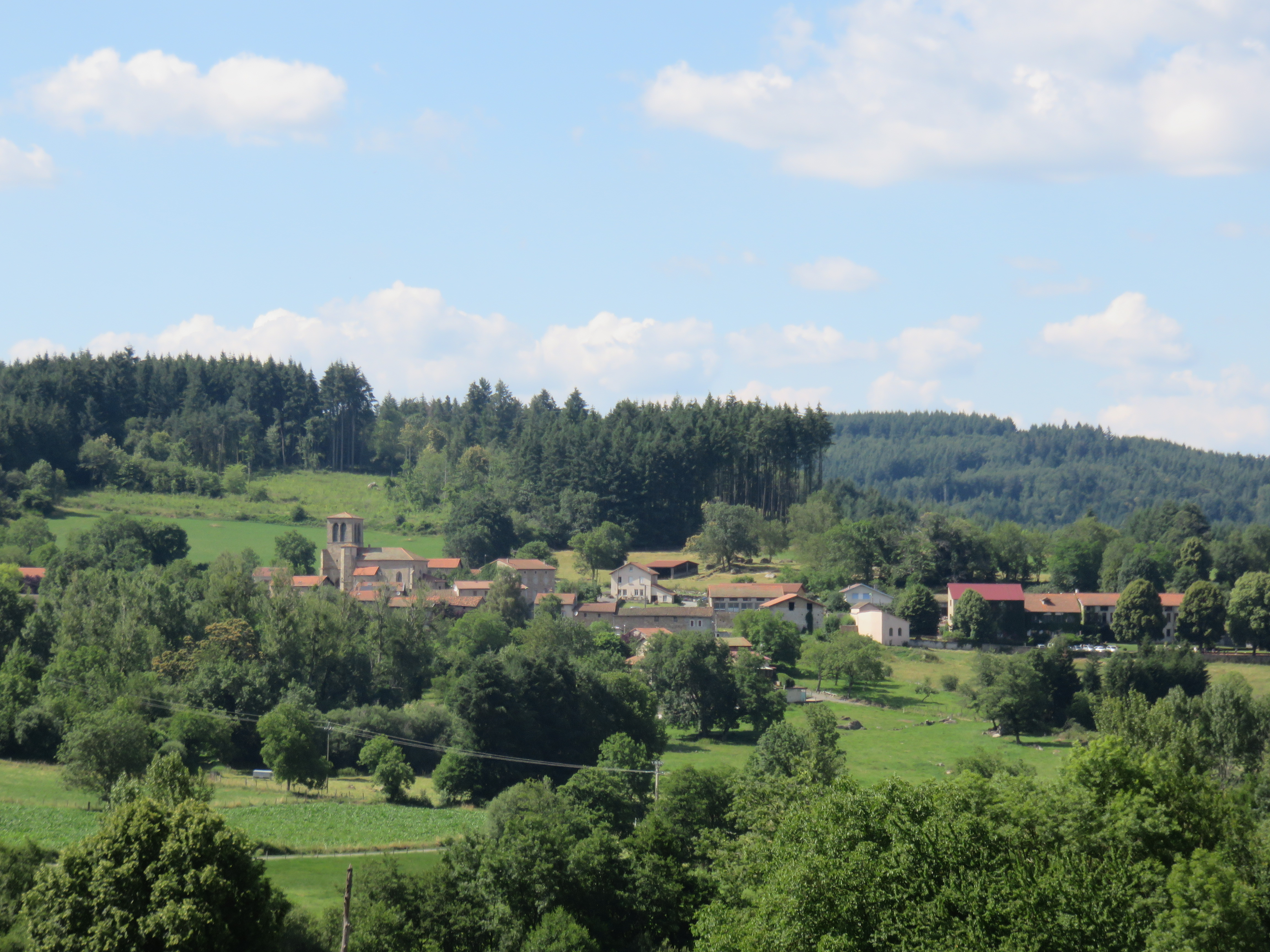
- Location of Saint-Priest-la-Vêtre
- Location within France Location within Auvergne-Rhône-Alpes
- Coordinates: 45°48′20″N 3°48′50″E
- Country: France
- Region: Auvergne-Rhône-Alpes
- Department: Loire
- Arrondissement: Montbrison
- Canton: Boën-sur-Lignon
- Intercommunality: Loire Forez Agglomération

Government
  - Mayor (2020–2026): Jean-Marc Dumas
- Area^{1}: 5.17 km^{2} (2.00 sq mi)
- Elevation: 672 m (2,205 ft)
- Highest elevation: 820 m (2,690 ft)
- Lowest elevation: 607 m (1,991 ft)
- Population (2023): 141
  - Density: 27.3/km^{2} (70.6/sq mi)
- Time zone: UTC+01:00 (CET)
  - Summer (DST): UTC+02:00 (CEST)
- INSEE/Postal code: 42278 /42440
- ^{1} French Land Register data, which excludes lakes, ponds, glaciers > 1 km^{2} (0.386 sq mi or 247 acres) and river estuaries.

Saint-Priest-la-Vêtre (French pronunciation: [sɛ̃ pʁijɛ(st) la vɛtʁ]) is a commune in the Loire department in central France.

== Population ==
Historical population
Year	Pop.	±% p.a.
1968	204	—
1975	161	−3.33%
1982	135	−2.48%
1990	120	−1.46%
1999	106	−1.37%
2007	127	+2.29%
2012	147	+2.97%
2017	148	+0.14%
2023	141	−0.80%
Source: INSEE

== See also ==
- Communes of the Loire department
