= La Valla-sur-Rochefort =

- Commune
- Location of La Valla-sur-Rochefort
- Location within France Location within Auvergne-Rhône-Alpes
- Coordinates: 45°45′36″N 3°51′10″E
- Country: France
- Region: Auvergne-Rhône-Alpes
- Department: Loire
- Arrondissement: Montbrison
- Canton: Boën-sur-Lignon
- Intercommunality: Loire Forez Agglomération

Government
  - Mayor (2020–2026): Thierry Chavaren
- Area^{1}: 8.98 km^{2} (3.47 sq mi)
- Elevation: 830 m (2,720 ft)
- Highest elevation: 1,224 m (4,016 ft)
- Lowest elevation: 766 m (2,513 ft)
- Population (2023): 105
  - Density: 11.7/km^{2} (30.3/sq mi)
- Time zone: UTC+01:00 (CET)
  - Summer (DST): UTC+02:00 (CEST)
- INSEE/Postal code: 42321 /42111
- ^{1} French Land Register data, which excludes lakes, ponds, glaciers > 1 km^{2} (0.386 sq mi or 247 acres) and river estuaries.

La Valla-sur-Rochefort (French pronunciation: [la vala syʁ ʁɔʃfɔʁ], literally La Valla on Rochefort, before 2001: La Valla) is a commune in the Loire department in central France.

== Population ==
Historical population
Year	Pop.	±% p.a.
1968	191	—
1975	171	−1.57%
1982	138	−3.02%
1990	150	+1.05%
1999	121	−2.36%
2007	132	+1.09%
2012	124	−1.24%
2017	104	−3.46%
2023	105	+0.16%
Source: INSEE

== See also ==
- Communes of the Loire department
