= Les Salles =

- Commune
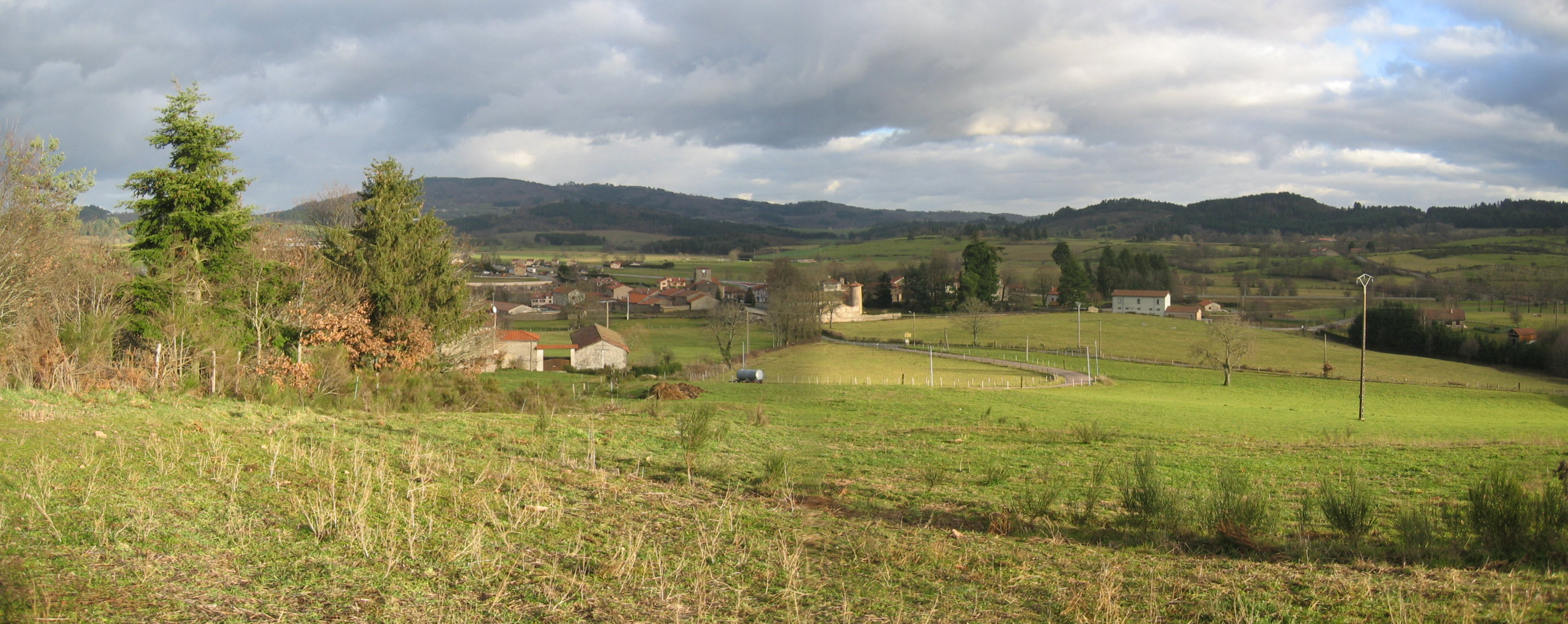

- Coat of arms
- Location of Les Salles
- Location within France Location within Auvergne-Rhône-Alpes
- Coordinates: 45°50′55″N 3°47′40″E
- Country: France
- Region: Auvergne-Rhône-Alpes
- Department: Loire
- Arrondissement: Montbrison
- Canton: Boën-sur-Lignon

Government
  - Mayor (2020–2026): Jean-Hervé Peurière
- Area^{1}: 25.22 km^{2} (9.74 sq mi)
- Elevation: 690 m (2,260 ft)
- Highest elevation: 963 m (3,159 ft)
- Lowest elevation: 636 m (2,087 ft)
- Population (2023): 558
  - Density: 22.1/km^{2} (57.3/sq mi)
- Time zone: UTC+01:00 (CET)
  - Summer (DST): UTC+02:00 (CEST)
- INSEE/Postal code: 42295 /42440
- ^{1} French Land Register data, which excludes lakes, ponds, glaciers > 1 km^{2} (0.386 sq mi or 247 acres) and river estuaries.

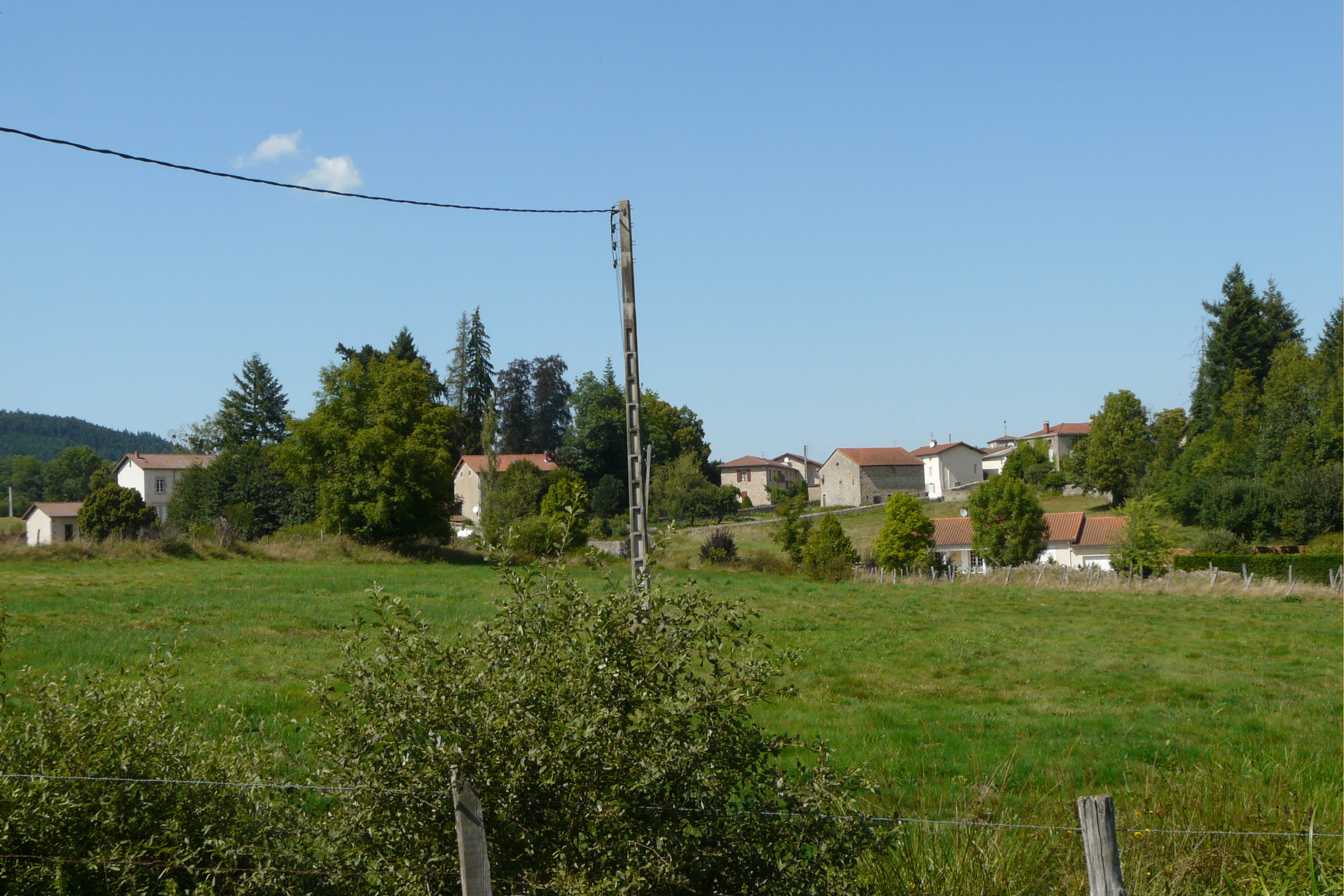

Les Salles (French pronunciation: [le sal]) is a commune in the Loire department in central France.

== Geography ==
Les Salles is a part of the Forez region and is located to the extreme west of the Loire department. The territory represents an area of 2521 ha.

The territory is composed of:

- A border and mountainous forest in the northwest in the foothills of the Massif des Bois Noirs.*The gently sloping hills in the central area (La Goutte Le Bourg-Méranges).
- Extensive flat areas in the southeast (Les Bataillouse, La Plagnette).
- The highest elevation of the territory is located in St Thomas Wood at 963 m. The lowest elevation is 652 m at Le Lac.

== Hydrography ==
The main rivers are the Royon stream, the stream of La Goutte and the stream of Bareille which will combine to form further down the stream of Les Salles.

The village is dotted with many lakes: La Goutte, Royon, La Plagnette, Goutoule, Guirande, St. Claude, Relange, Rullion, Traversieres ... Note also the presence of peatlands, the most extensive is located at Souillat.

== Geology ==
The basement is largely granitic (type monzogranite) with a limestone area on the side of Fialins and Fours à Chaux (calcareous tufa element)

== Sights ==
- Druidic stones: La Pierre Branlante, La Pierre du Sacrifice.
- Méranges, place the oldest city: in 982 in the cartulary of Savigny.
- The Roman road Clermont-Lyon (Les Meaudres- Le Bourg-La-Croix-Blanche-Relange- L'Étrat)
- The church dating from the 12th century (one of the oldest in the region).
- The St Roch chapel, built in the 1630s following a vow made by the inhabitants of Les Salles and Cervières during the plague epidemic.
- The Underground: The Village (presbytery), Chapt, Fauchemagne, Le Lac, Coavoux, La Cure, Méranges ... (ref: GRAL surveys)
- Fortified Farms: Relange, Rullion, Le Verdier
- Castles: La Goutte, Les Serrots, Chapt
- Places legendary: tomb of Mona, the rock of the Mule.

== History ==
The earliest citation of the name of the town dates from about the year 1000 in the cartulary of Savigny: Ecclesia de Sales. Found in another edition of this book even a citation in 1225: Ecclesia de Salis and 1362: Sancti Petri di Salis. Until the Revolution the town was called St Pierre des Salles.

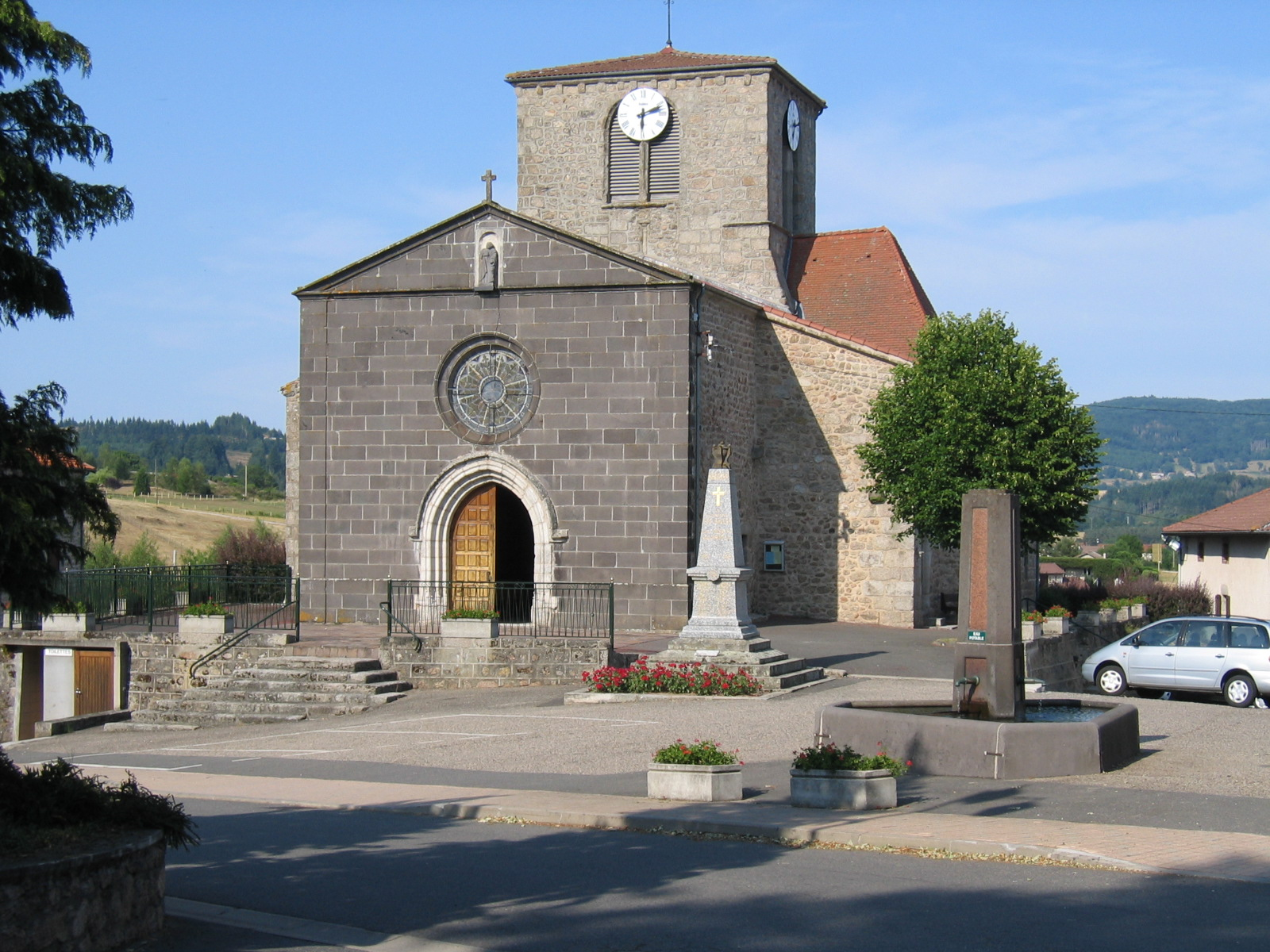

== Origin of name ==
The experts are somewhat divided on the origin of the name

- To Dauzat name comes from the Germanic word "Saal" room - Similarly for Louis Pierre Augereau, the name comes from the word "room" in which former French designated the seat of a lordship, a mansion or a fortified house. This word derives from late Latin "sala" after borrowing from Frankish "sal" which resulted in German, "Saal" bedroom castle. - To Vachet it derive from the Latin "olla" pots, jars, even "Aula": courtyard home - Others see a merger with St. Francois de Sales. - Some derive the name from the Latin "Saltus" wooded place - Another theory derives the name "Willow" and especially his translation of Germanic "Salt" - Charles Jacquet, local historian, makes about him, the Assuming an origin linked to the Latin word "sala" which in his time meant hotellerie, tavern. It refers to a bridge located along the Roman road Lyon - Bordeaux happening in the town and that was somehow behind the village. Still, to date, no explanation is unanimous.

Les Bataillouses: In November 1567, a group of Protestants, led by Poncenat is defeated by the Catholics of the Marquis de La Chabre . This battle cost the lives of some 300 soldiers. (ref: Les guerres religieuses en Auvergne - Andre IMBERDIS)

== Administration ==
Previous mayors:

- Joseph Brunet
- Charles Pilonchery
- Philippe Godard

Current mayor: Jean-Hervé Peurière

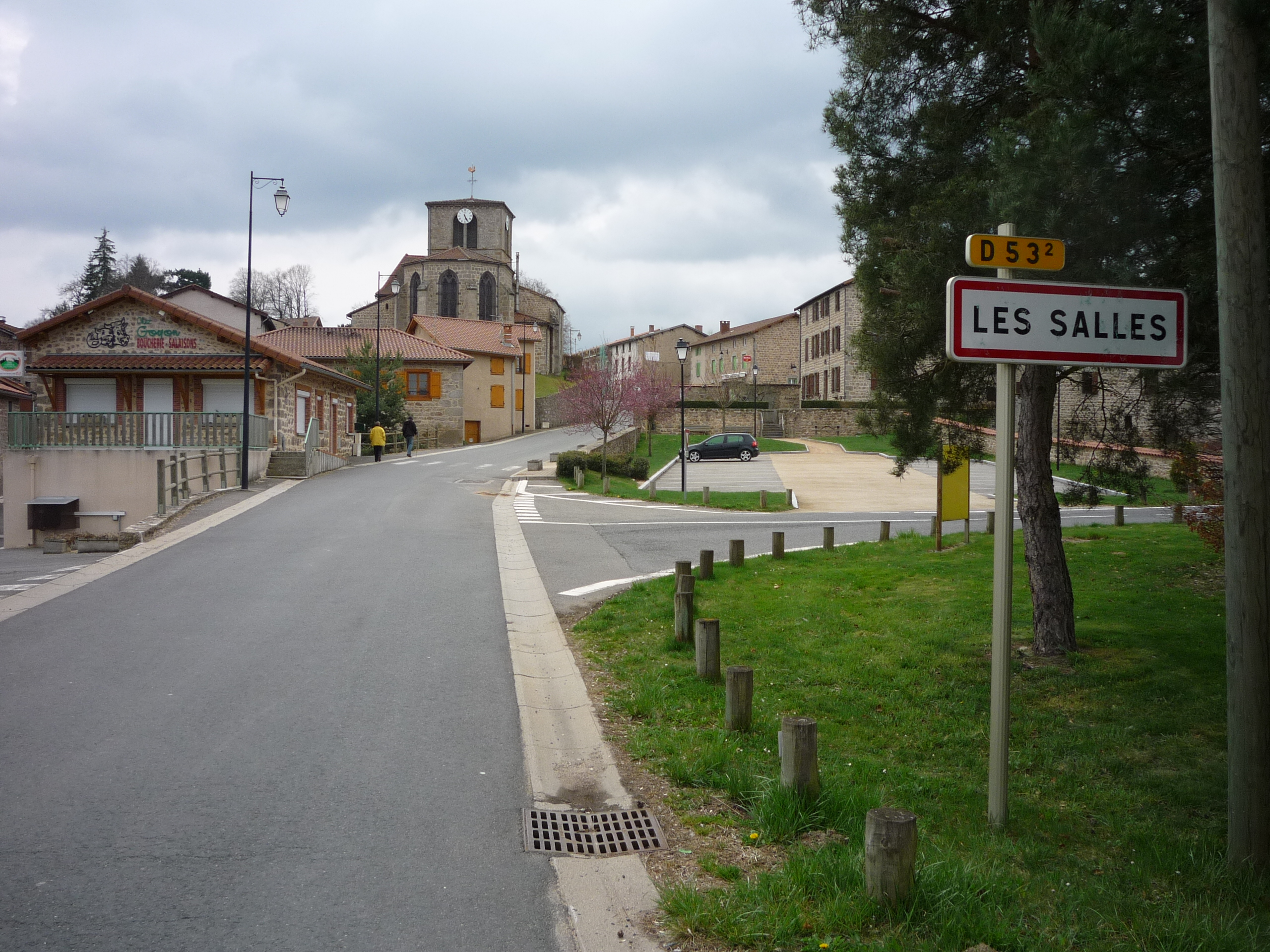
the gate of the village

== Population ==
Historical population
| Year | Pop. | ±% p.a. |
|---|---|---|
| 1968 | 505 | — |
| 1975 | 412 | −2.87% |
| 1982 | 518 | +3.32% |
| 1990 | 441 | −1.99% |
| 1999 | 424 | −0.44% |
| 2007 | 471 | +1.32% |
| 2012 | 502 | +1.28% |
| 2017 | 541 | +1.51% |
| 2023 | 558 | +0.52% |
Source: INSEE

== Personaltities ==
- Etienne Francois of Kair Blumestein (1712–1799): Inspector of Mines, German origin. He established in 1730 to drop a smelter to process the lead extracted from its mines Champoly and Juré. He bought the La Goutte castle in 1753 to live in.
- Jean Baptiste Francois Kair of Blumestein (1759–1854): Officer, Knight of St. Louis and engineer of the Highways. He took over from his father Etienne to exploit lead in La Goutte. He was the first mayor of LEs Salles in 1791, and was then mayor of Lezoux from 1806 to 1830.
- Francois Gilbert Planche (1866–1924), engineer, industrialist and member of the Hautes-Alpes, whose family hails from the hamlet of Coavoux. A man of action, it has invested in railways in the mining and electric power. He is considered one of the "fathers of the hydro-electricity in the Alps.

== Sports clubs ==
Football : ASCLS (Association Sportive Chausseterre Les Salles) created in 1973. Colors Yellow and Blue.

== See also ==
- Communes of the Loire department
