= Cervières, Loire =

Cervières
- Commune
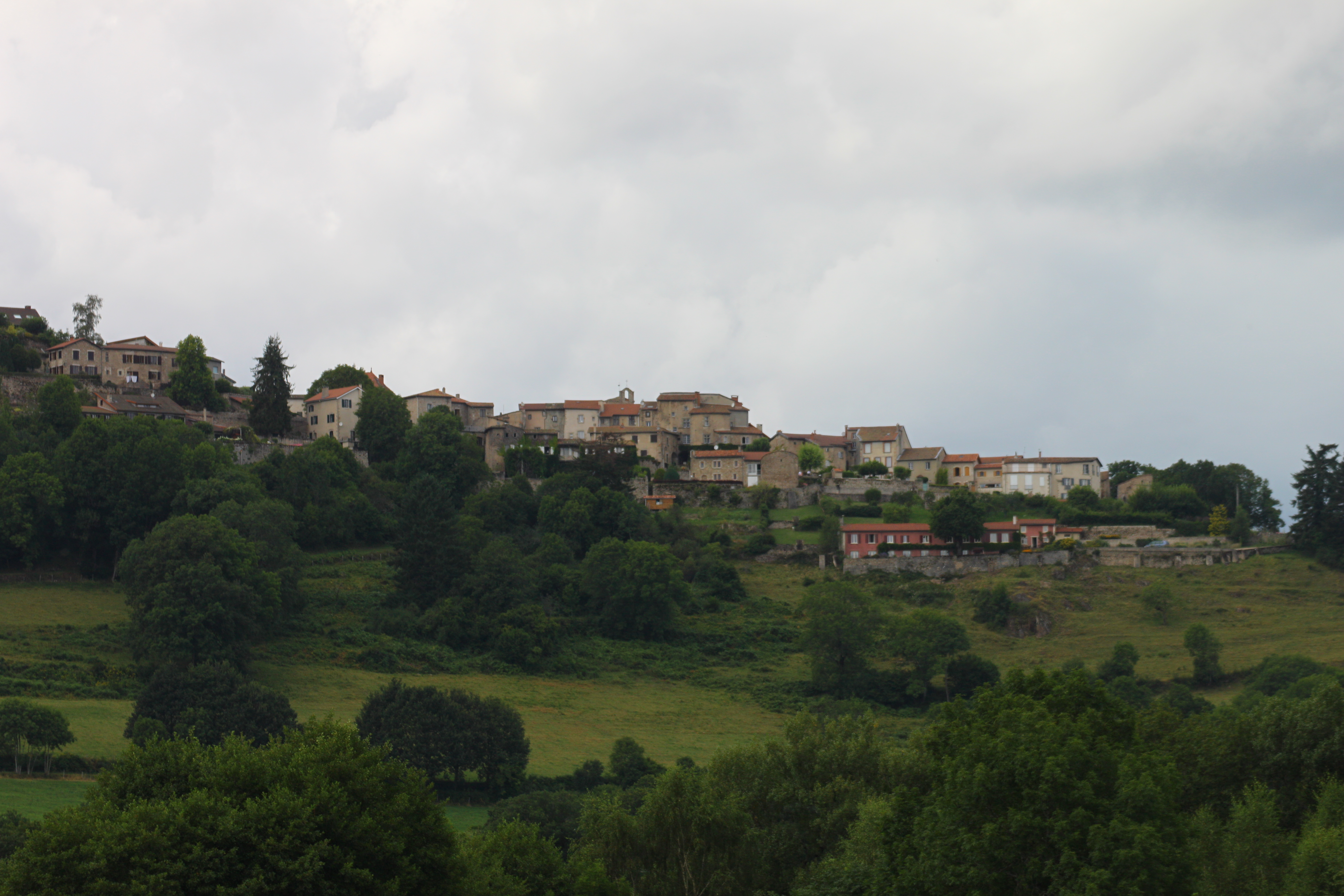

- Coat of arms
- Location of Cervières
- Location within France Location within Auvergne-Rhône-Alpes
- Coordinates: 45°50′55″N 3°46′23″E
- Country: France
- Region: Auvergne-Rhône-Alpes
- Department: Loire
- Arrondissement: Montbrison
- Canton: Boën-sur-Lignon
- Intercommunality: CA Loire Forez

Government
  - Mayor (2020–2026): Frédérique Seret
- Area^{1}: 7.56 km^{2} (2.92 sq mi)
- Highest elevation: 979 m (3,212 ft)
- Lowest elevation: 655 m (2,149 ft)
- Population (2023): 103
  - Density: 13.6/km^{2} (35.3/sq mi)
- Time zone: UTC+01:00 (CET)
  - Summer (DST): UTC+02:00 (CEST)
- INSEE/Postal code: 42034 /42440
- ^{1} French Land Register data, which excludes lakes, ponds, glaciers > 1 km^{2} (0.386 sq mi or 247 acres) and river estuaries.

Cervières is a commune in the Loire department in central France.

== Population ==
Historical population
Year	Pop.	±% p.a.
1968	135	—
1975	117	−2.02%
1982	111	−0.75%
1990	102	−1.05%
1999	111	+0.94%
2007	126	+1.60%
2012	115	−1.81%
2017	120	+0.85%
2023	103	−2.51%
Source: INSEE

== See also ==
- Communes of the Loire department
