= Canton of Boën-sur-Lignon =

Coordinates: 45.7506°N 4.0075°E

Boën-sur-Lignon
- Canton
- Country: France
- Region: Auvergne-Rhône-Alpes
- Department: Loire
- No. of communes: {{{nbcomm}}}
- Area: 817.31 km^{2} (315.57 sq mi)
- Population (2023): 30,005
  - Density: 36.712/km^{2} (95.083/sq mi)
- INSEE code: 42 02

The canton of Boën-sur-Lignon is a French administrative division located in the department of Loire and the Auvergne-Rhône-Alpes region. At the French canton reorganisation which came into effect in March 2015, the canton was expanded from 18 to 55 communes (12 of which merged into the new communes Chalmazel-Jeansagnière, Vêtre-sur-Anzon, Vézelin-sur-Loire, La Côte-Saint-Didier and Solore-en-Forez):

1. Ailleux
2. Arthun
3. Boën-sur-Lignon
4. Bully
5. Bussy-Albieux
6. Cervières
7. Cezay
8. Chalmazel-Jeansagnière
9. La Chamba
10. La Chambonie
11. Champdieu
12. Châtelneuf
13. La Côte-Saint-Didier
14. Essertines-en-Châtelneuf
15. Grézolles
16. Leigneux
17. Luré
18. Marcilly-le-Châtel
19. Marcoux
20. Montverdun
21. Noirétable
22. Nollieux
23. Palogneux
24. Pommiers-en-Forez
25. Pralong
26. Sail-sous-Couzan
27. Saint-Bonnet-le-Courreau
28. Sainte-Agathe-la-Bouteresse
29. Sainte-Foy-Saint-Sulpice
30. Saint-Étienne-le-Molard
31. Saint-Georges-de-Baroille
32. Saint-Georges-en-Couzan
33. Saint-Germain-Laval
34. Saint-Jean-la-Vêtre
35. Saint-Julien-d'Oddes
36. Saint-Just-en-Bas
37. Saint-Martin-la-Sauveté
38. Saint-Polgues
39. Saint-Priest-la-Vêtre
40. Saint-Sixte
41. Les Salles
42. Sauvain
43. Solore-en-Forez
44. Souternon
45. Trelins
46. La Valla-sur-Rochefort
47. Vêtre-sur-Anzon
48. Vézelin-sur-Loire

== See also ==
- Cantons of the Loire department
