= Canton of Belmont-de-la-Loire =

Coordinates: 46.1396°N 4.3189°E

Belmont-de-la-Loire
- Former canton
- Interactive map of Belmont-de-la-Loire
- Country: France
- Region: Auvergne-Rhône-Alpes
- Department: Loire
- No. of communes: {{{nbcomm}}}
- Disbanded: 2015
- Area: 99.81 km^{2} (38.54 sq mi)
- Population (2012): 5,679
  - Density: 56.90/km^{2} (147.4/sq mi)

The canton of Belmont-de-la-Loire is a French former administrative division located in the department of Loire and the Rhone-Alpes region. It was disbanded following the French canton reorganisation which came into effect in March 2015. It consisted of 9 communes, which joined the canton of Charlieu in 2015. It had 5,679 inhabitants (2012).

The canton comprised the following communes:

- Arcinges
- Belleroche
- Belmont-de-la-Loire
- Le Cergne
- Cuinzier
- Écoche
- La Gresle
- Saint-Germain-la-Montagne
- Sevelinges

== See also ==
- Cantons of the Loire department
