= Arrondissement of Roanne =

Coordinates: 46°01′58″N 4°04′08″E

Roanne
- Arrondissement
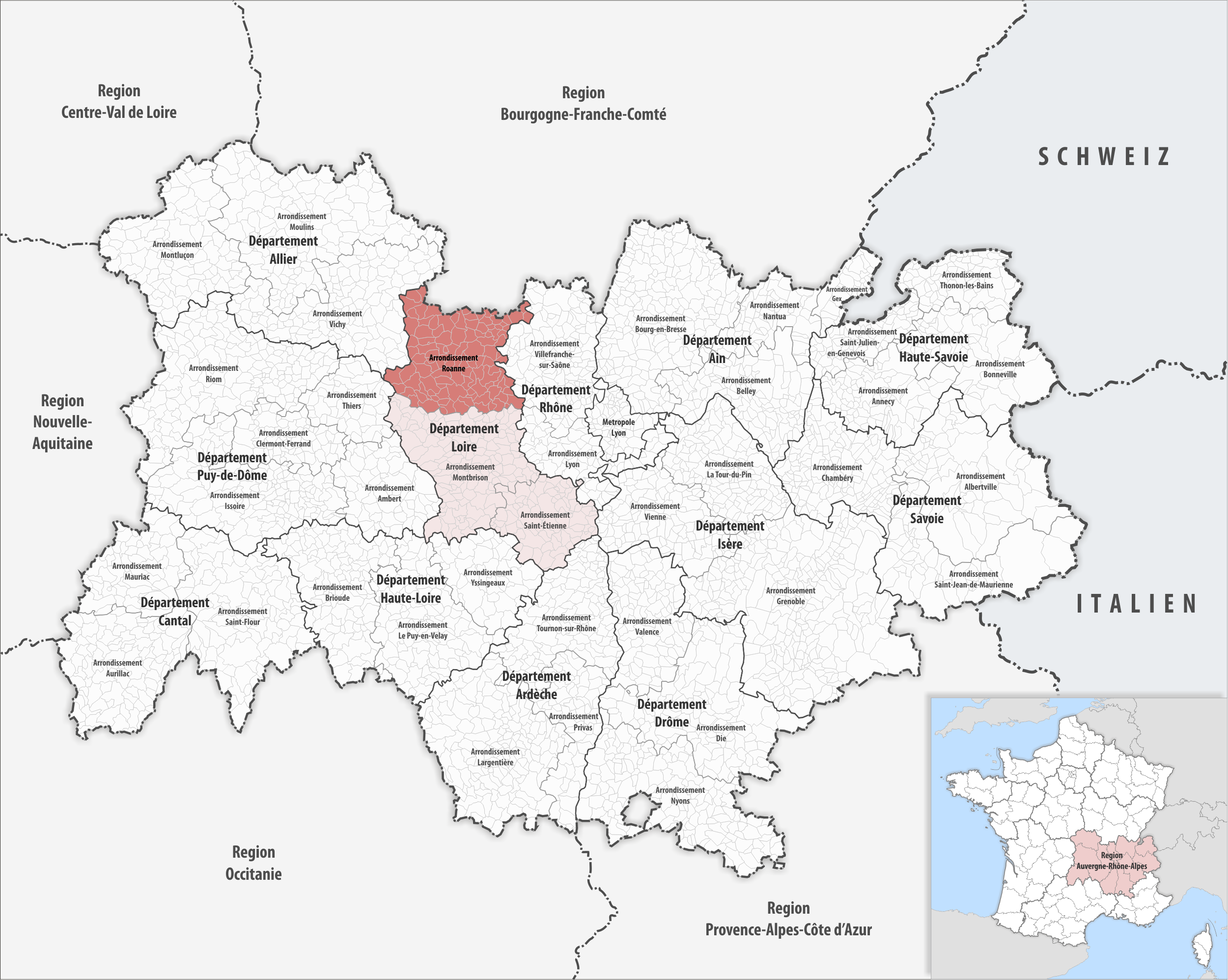
- Location within the region Auvergne-Rhône-Alpes
- Country: France
- Region: Auvergne-Rhône-Alpes
- Department: Loire
- No. of communes: {{{nbcomm}}}
- Area: 1,779.9 km^{2} (687.2 sq mi)
- Population (2023): 158,626
  - Density: 89.121/km^{2} (230.82/sq mi)
- INSEE code: 422

The arrondissement of Roanne is located in the Loire department in the Auvergne-Rhône-Alpes region of France. It is composed of 113 communes. Its population is 157,642 (2021), and its area is 1,779.9 km^{2} (687.2 sq mi).

== Composition ==
The communes of the arrondissement of Roanne, and their INSEE codes, are:

1. Ambierle (42003)
2. Arcinges (42007)
3. Arcon (42008)
4. Balbigny (42011)
5. Belleroche (42014)
6. Belmont-de-la-Loire (42015)
7. La Bénisson-Dieu (42016)
8. Boyer (42025)
9. Briennon (42026)
10. Bully (42027)
11. Bussières (42029)
12. Le Cergne (42033)
13. Champoly (42047)
14. Chandon (42048)
15. Changy (42049)
16. Charlieu (42052)
17. Chausseterre (42339)
18. Cherier (42061)
19. Chirassimont (42063)
20. Combre (42068)
21. Commelle-Vernay (42069)
22. Cordelle (42070)
23. Le Coteau (42071)
24. Coutouvre (42074)
25. Cremeaux (42076)
26. Croizet-sur-Gand (42077)
27. Le Crozet (42078)
28. Cuinzier (42079)
29. Écoche (42086)
30. Fourneaux (42098)
31. La Gresle (42104)
32. Grézolles (42106)
33. Jarnosse (42112)
34. Juré (42116)
35. Lay (42118)
36. Lentigny (42120)
37. Luré (42125)
38. Mably (42127)
39. Machézal (42128)
40. Maizilly (42131)
41. Mars (42141)
42. Montagny (42145)
43. Nandax (42152)
44. Neaux (42153)
45. Néronde (42154)
46. Neulise (42156)
47. Noailly (42157)
48. Les Noës (42158)
49. Nollieux (42160)
50. Notre-Dame-de-Boisset (42161)
51. Ouches (42162)
52. La Pacaudière (42163)
53. Parigny (42166)
54. Perreux (42170)
55. Pinay (42171)
56. Pommiers-en-Forez (42173)
57. Pouilly-les-Nonains (42176)
58. Pouilly-sous-Charlieu (42177)
59. Pradines (42178)
60. Régny (42181)
61. Renaison (42182)
62. Riorges (42184)
63. Roanne (42187)
64. Sail-les-Bains (42194)
65. Saint-Alban-les-Eaux (42198)
66. Saint-André-d'Apchon (42199)
67. Saint-Bonnet-des-Quarts (42203)
68. Saint-Cyr-de-Favières (42212)
69. Saint-Cyr-de-Valorges (42213)
70. Saint-Denis-de-Cabanne (42215)
71. Sainte-Agathe-en-Donzy (42196)
72. Sainte-Colombe-sur-Gand (42209)
73. Saint-Forgeux-Lespinasse (42220)
74. Saint-Georges-de-Baroille (42226)
75. Saint-Germain-la-Montagne (42229)
76. Saint-Germain-Laval (42230)
77. Saint-Germain-Lespinasse (42231)
78. Saint-Haon-le-Châtel (42232)
79. Saint-Haon-le-Vieux (42233)
80. Saint-Hilaire-sous-Charlieu (42236)
81. Saint-Jean-Saint-Maurice-sur-Loire (42239)
82. Saint-Jodard (42241)
83. Saint-Julien-d'Oddes (42243)
84. Saint-Just-en-Chevalet (42248)
85. Saint-Just-la-Pendue (42249)
86. Saint-Léger-sur-Roanne (42253)
87. Saint-Marcel-de-Félines (42254)
88. Saint-Marcel-d'Urfé (42255)
89. Saint-Martin-d'Estréaux (42257)
90. Saint-Martin-la-Sauveté (42260)
91. Saint-Nizier-sous-Charlieu (42267)
92. Saint-Pierre-la-Noaille (42273)
93. Saint-Polgues (42274)
94. Saint-Priest-la-Prugne (42276)
95. Saint-Priest-la-Roche (42277)
96. Saint-Rirand (42281)
97. Saint-Romain-d'Urfé (42282)
98. Saint-Romain-la-Motte (42284)
99. Saint-Symphorien-de-Lay (42289)
100. Saint-Victor-sur-Rhins (42293)
101. Saint-Vincent-de-Boisset (42294)
102. Sevelinges (42300)
103. Souternon (42303)
104. La Tuilière (42314)
105. Urbise (42317)
106. Vendranges (42325)
107. Vézelin-sur-Loire (42268)
108. Villemontais (42331)
109. Villerest (42332)
110. Villers (42333)
111. Violay (42334)
112. Vivans (42337)
113. Vougy (42338)

== History ==
The arrondissement of Roanne was created in 1800.

As a result of the reorganisation of the cantons of France which came into effect in 2015, the borders of the cantons are no longer related to the borders of the arrondissements. The cantons of the arrondissement of Roanne were, as of January 2015:

1. Belmont-de-la-Loire
2. Charlieu
3. La Pacaudière
4. Néronde
5. Perreux
6. Roanne-Nord
7. Roanne-Sud
8. Saint-Germain-Laval
9. Saint-Haon-le-Châtel
10. Saint-Just-en-Chevalet
11. Saint-Symphorien-de-Lay
