= Pouilly-sous-Charlieu =

Pouilly-sous-Charlieu Polyé (Arpitan)
- Commune
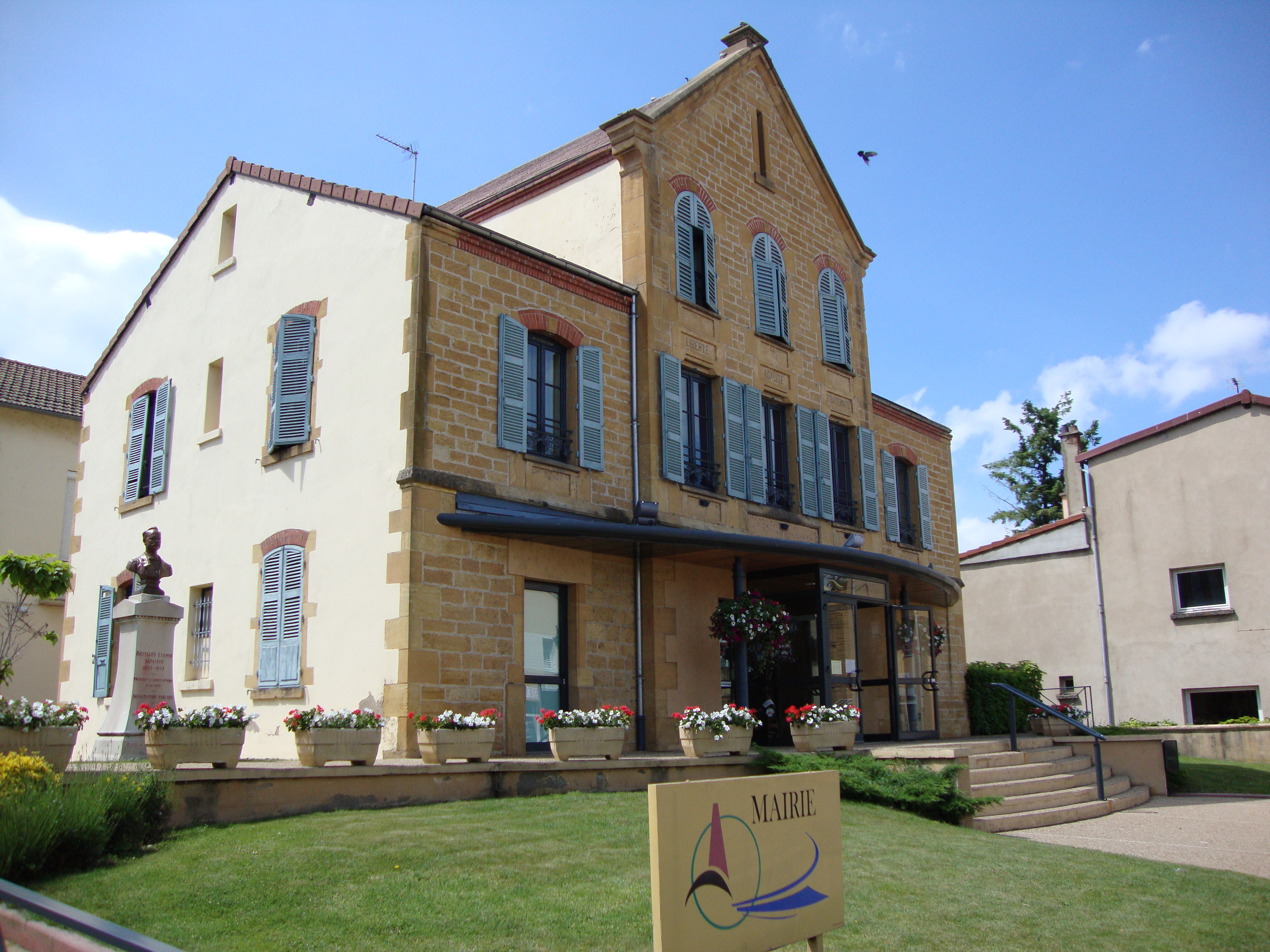
- Town hall

- Coat of arms
- Location of Pouilly-sous-Charlieu
- Location within France Location within Auvergne-Rhône-Alpes
- Coordinates: 46°08′44″N 4°06′34″E
- Country: France
- Region: Auvergne-Rhône-Alpes
- Department: Loire
- Arrondissement: Roanne
- Canton: Charlieu

Government
  - Mayor (2020–2026): Philippe Jarsaillon
- Area^{1}: 15.99 km^{2} (6.17 sq mi)
- Elevation: 264 m (866 ft)
- Highest elevation: 331 m (1,086 ft)
- Lowest elevation: 251 m (823 ft)
- Population (2023): 2,588
  - Density: 161.9/km^{2} (419.2/sq mi)
- Time zone: UTC+01:00 (CET)
  - Summer (DST): UTC+02:00 (CEST)
- INSEE/Postal code: 42177 /42720
- ^{1} French Land Register data, which excludes lakes, ponds, glaciers > 1 km^{2} (0.386 sq mi or 247 acres) and river estuaries.

Pouilly-sous-Charlieu (French pronunciation: [puji su ʃaʁljø], lit. 'Pouilly under Charlieu'; Arpitan: Polyé [po.ˈjəː]) is a commune in the Loire department in central France.

== Population ==
Historical population

Year	Pop.	±% p.a.
1793	1,060	—
1821	1,192	+0.42%
1846	1,645	+1.30%
1872	1,814	+0.38%
1901	2,061	+0.44%
1926	2,080	+0.04%
1946	2,071	−0.02%
1962	2,296	+0.65%
1968	2,529	+1.62%

Year	Pop.	±% p.a.
1975	2,681	+0.84%
1982	2,973	+1.49%
1990	2,834	−0.60%
1999	2,720	−0.46%
2007	2,646	−0.34%
2012	2,534	−0.86%
2017	2,471	−0.50%
2023	2,588	+0.77%

Source: EHESS and INSEE (1968-2023)

== Twin towns – sister cities ==
Pouilly-sous-Charlieu is twinned with:

- Candiolo, Italy (2007)

== See also ==
- Communes of the Loire department
