= Saint-Nizier-sous-Charlieu =

Saint-Nizier-sous-Charlieu Sant-Nesiés (Arpitan)
- Commune
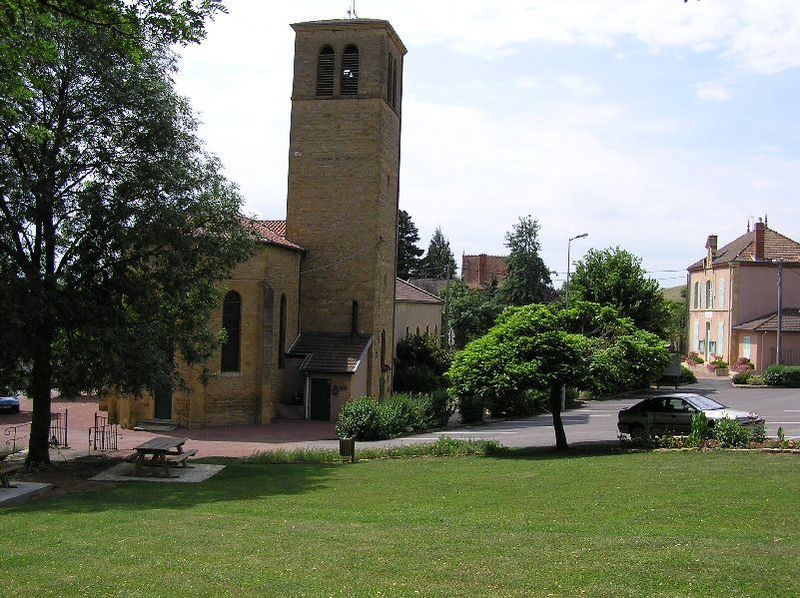
- Church and town hall
- Location of Saint-Nizier-sous-Charlieu
- Location within France Location within Auvergne-Rhône-Alpes
- Coordinates: 46°09′14″N 4°07′24″E
- Country: France
- Region: Auvergne-Rhône-Alpes
- Department: Loire
- Arrondissement: Roanne
- Canton: Charlieu
- Intercommunality: Charlieu-Belmont

Government
  - Mayor (2020–2026): Fabrice Chenaud
- Area^{1}: 12.83 km^{2} (4.95 sq mi)
- Elevation: 260 m (850 ft)
- Highest elevation: 408 m (1,339 ft)
- Lowest elevation: 252 m (827 ft)
- Population (2023): 1,686
  - Density: 131.4/km^{2} (340.4/sq mi)
- Time zone: UTC+01:00 (CET)
  - Summer (DST): UTC+02:00 (CEST)
- INSEE/Postal code: 42267 /42190
- ^{1} French Land Register data, which excludes lakes, ponds, glaciers > 1 km^{2} (0.386 sq mi or 247 acres) and river estuaries.

Saint-Nizier-sous-Charlieu (French pronunciation: [sɛ̃ nizje su ʃaʁljø], literally Saint-Nizier under Charlieu; Arpitan: Sant-Nesiés [sã nzi]) is a commune in the Loire department in central France.

== Population ==
Historical population
Year	Pop.	±% p.a.
1968	1,056	—
1975	1,216	+2.04%
1982	1,449	+2.54%
1990	1,579	+1.08%
1999	1,571	−0.06%
2007	1,644	+0.57%
2012	1,679	+0.42%
2017	1,702	+0.27%
2023	1,686	−0.16%
Source: INSEE

== See also ==
- Communes of the Loire department
