= Saint-Hilaire-sous-Charlieu =

Saint-Hilaire-sous-Charlieu Sant-Hilèro (Arpitan)
- Commune
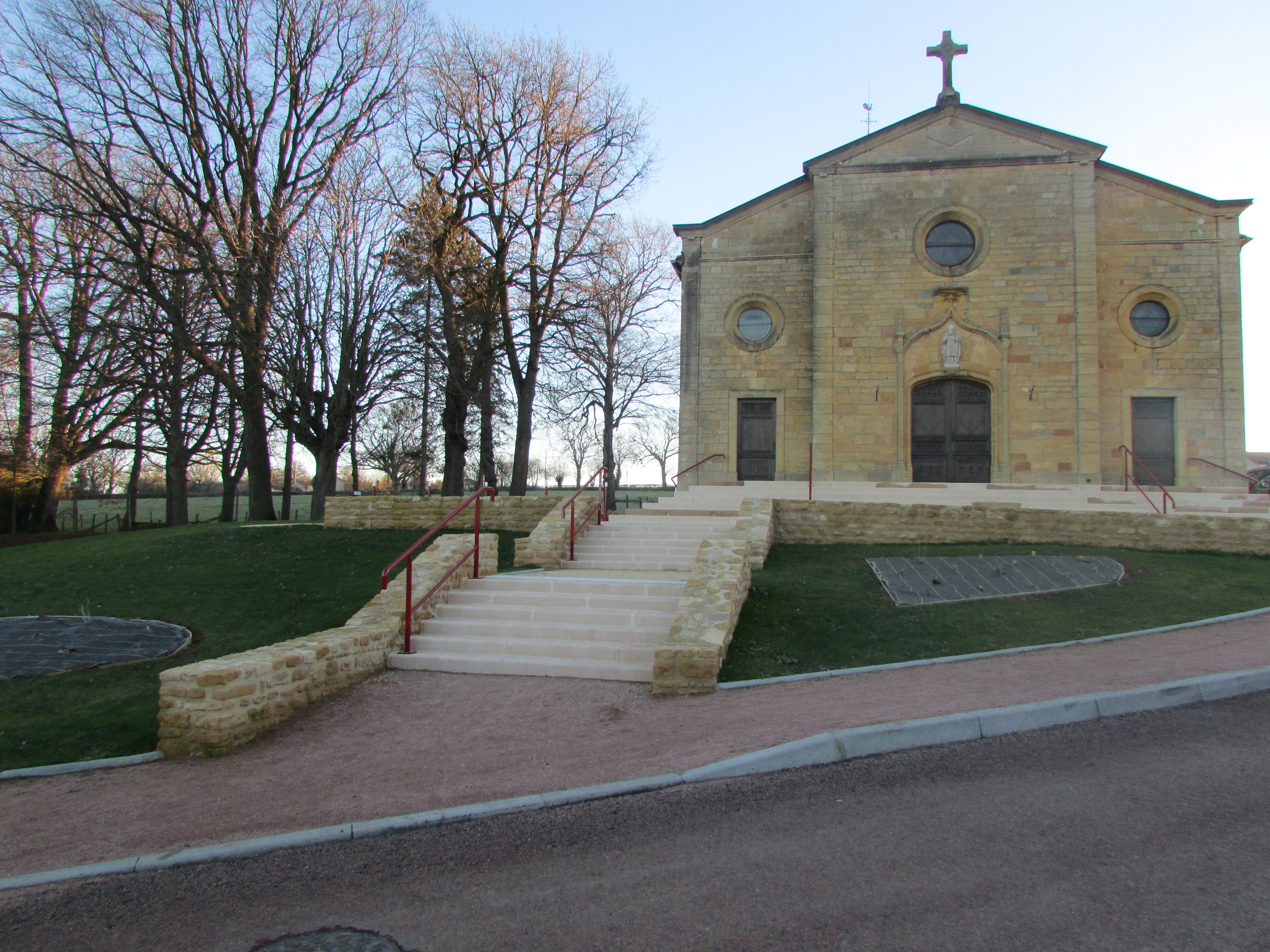
- Location of Saint-Hilaire-sous-Charlieu
- Location within France Location within Auvergne-Rhône-Alpes
- Coordinates: 46°07′21″N 4°11′02″E
- Country: France
- Region: Auvergne-Rhône-Alpes
- Department: Loire
- Arrondissement: Roanne
- Canton: Charlieu

Government
  - Mayor (2020–2026): Florence Leblanc
- Area^{1}: 13.51 km^{2} (5.22 sq mi)
- Elevation: 330 m (1,080 ft)
- Highest elevation: 464 m (1,522 ft)
- Lowest elevation: 280 m (920 ft)
- Population (2023): 548
  - Density: 40.6/km^{2} (105/sq mi)
- Time zone: UTC+01:00 (CET)
  - Summer (DST): UTC+02:00 (CEST)
- INSEE/Postal code: 42236 /42190
- ^{1} French Land Register data, which excludes lakes, ponds, glaciers > 1 km^{2} (0.386 sq mi or 247 acres) and river estuaries.

Saint-Hilaire-sous-Charlieu (French pronunciation: [sɛ̃.t‿ilɛʁ su ʃaʁljø], literally Saint-Hilaire under Charlieu; Arpitan: Sant-Hilèro [sã.t‿i.ˈlɛːʀ]) is a commune in the Loire department in central France.

== Population ==
Historical population
Year	Pop.	±% p.a.
1968	318	—
1975	290	−1.31%
1982	365	+3.34%
1990	390	+0.83%
1999	399	+0.25%
2007	505	+2.99%
2012	560	+2.09%
2017	535	−0.91%
2023	548	+0.40%
Source: INSEE

== See also ==
- Communes of the Loire department
