= Chandon =

- Commune
- Location of Chandon
- Location within France Location within Auvergne-Rhône-Alpes
- Coordinates: 46°09′00″N 4°12′54″E
- Country: France
- Region: Auvergne-Rhône-Alpes
- Department: Loire
- Arrondissement: Roanne
- Canton: Charlieu

Government
  - Mayor (2020–2026): Michel Durantin
- Area^{1}: 12.38 km^{2} (4.78 sq mi)
- Elevation: 375 m (1,230 ft)
- Highest elevation: 472 m (1,549 ft)
- Lowest elevation: 271 m (889 ft)
- Population (2023): 1,423
  - Density: 114.9/km^{2} (297.7/sq mi)
- Time zone: UTC+01:00 (CET)
  - Summer (DST): UTC+02:00 (CEST)
- INSEE/Postal code: 42048 /42190
- ^{1} French Land Register data, which excludes lakes, ponds, glaciers > 1 km^{2} (0.386 sq mi or 247 acres) and river estuaries.

Chandon (French pronunciation: [ʃɑ̃dɔ̃]) is a commune in the Loire department in central France.

== Population ==
Historical population
Year	Pop.	±% p.a.
1968	863	—
1975	984	+1.89%
1982	1,087	+1.43%
1990	1,296	+2.22%
1999	1,381	+0.71%
2007	1,452	+0.63%
2012	1,427	−0.35%
2017	1,484	+0.79%
2023	1,423	−0.70%
Source: INSEE

== See also ==
- Communes of the Loire department
