= Briennon =

- Commune
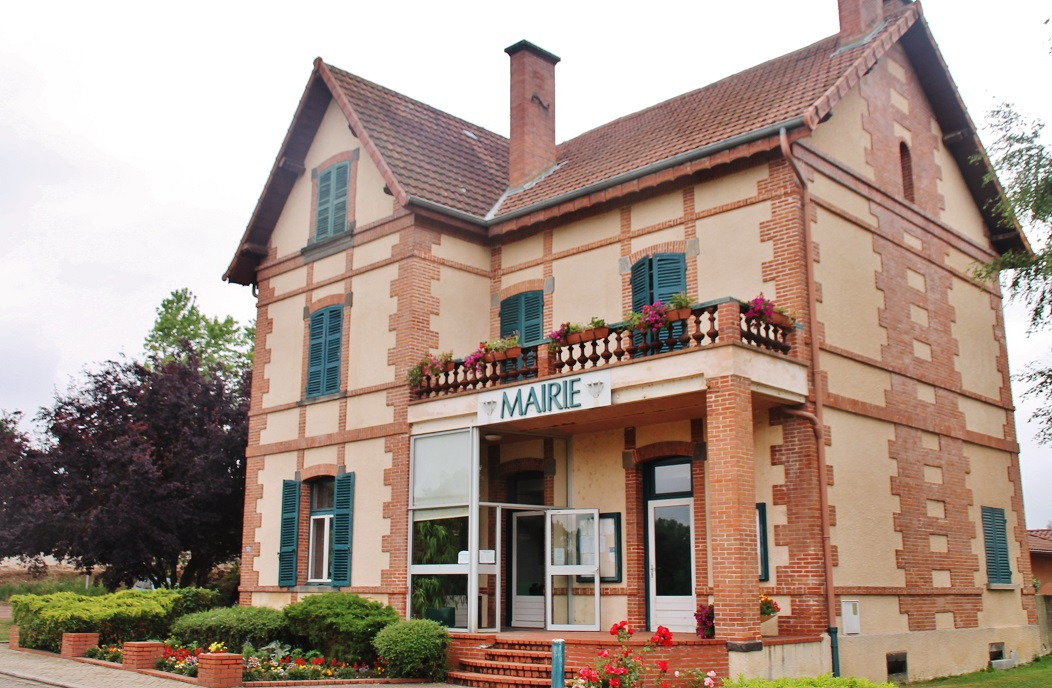
- Town hall
- Location of Briennon
- Location within France Location within Auvergne-Rhône-Alpes
- Coordinates: 46°09′00″N 4°05′11″E
- Country: France
- Region: Auvergne-Rhône-Alpes
- Department: Loire
- Arrondissement: Roanne
- Canton: Charlieu
- Intercommunality: Charlieu-Belmont

Government
  - Mayor (2020–2026): Jean Fayolle
- Area^{1}: 23.84 km^{2} (9.20 sq mi)
- Elevation: 275 m (902 ft)
- Highest elevation: 345 m (1,132 ft)
- Lowest elevation: 253 m (830 ft)
- Population (2023): 1,710
  - Density: 71.7/km^{2} (186/sq mi)
- Time zone: UTC+01:00 (CET)
  - Summer (DST): UTC+02:00 (CEST)
- INSEE/Postal code: 42026 /42720
- ^{1} French Land Register data, which excludes lakes, ponds, glaciers > 1 km^{2} (0.386 sq mi or 247 acres) and river estuaries.

Briennon (French pronunciation: [bʁijɛnɔ̃]) is a commune in the Loire department in central France.

== Population ==
Historical population
Year	Pop.	±% p.a.
1968	1,237	—
1975	1,236	−0.01%
1982	1,580	+3.57%
1990	1,652	+0.56%
1999	1,681	+0.19%
2007	1,710	+0.21%
2012	1,733	+0.27%
2017	1,692	−0.48%
2023	1,710	+0.18%
Source: INSEE

== See also ==
- Communes of the Loire department
