= Saint-Pierre-la-Noaille =

- Commune
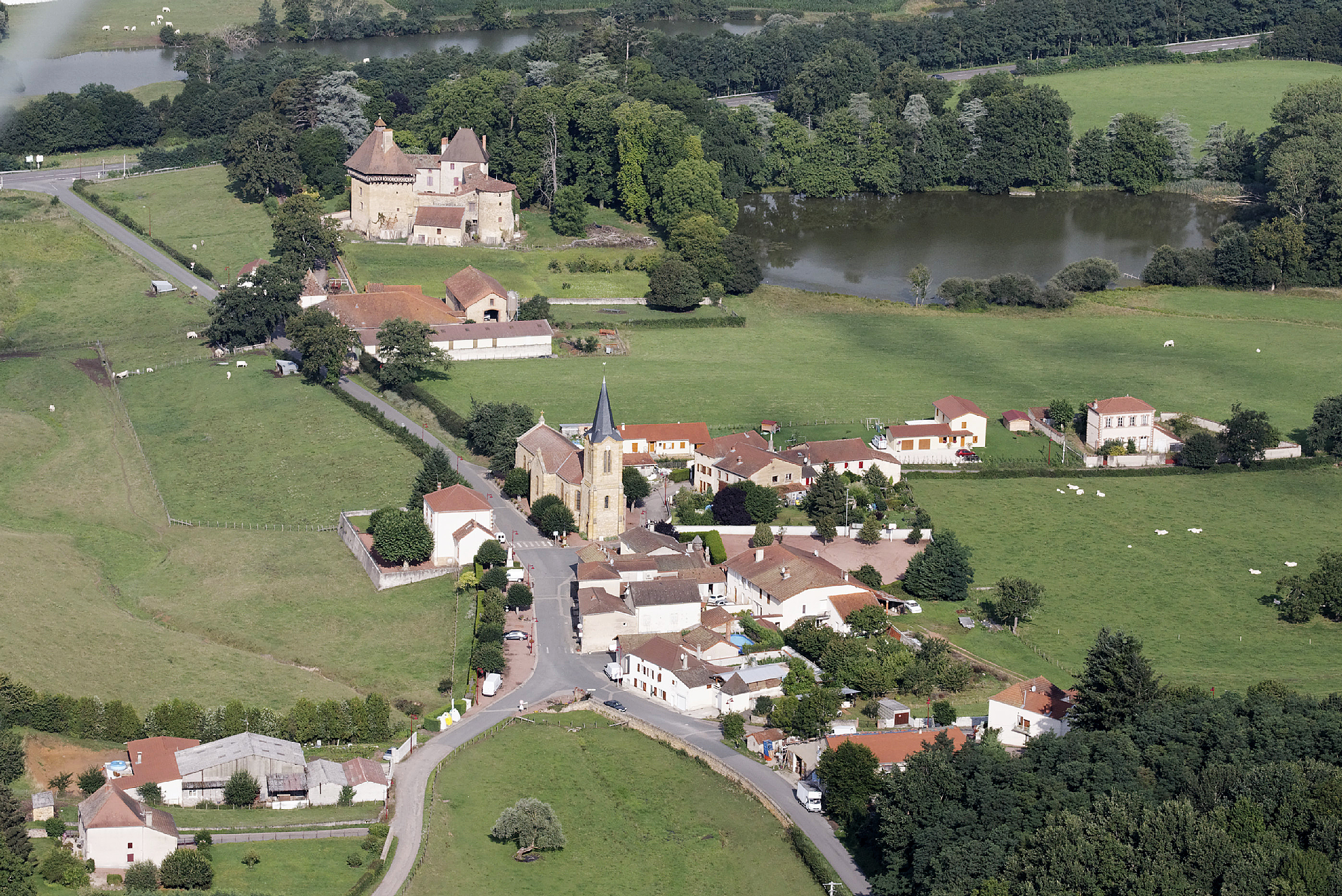
- An aerial view of Saint-Pierre-la-Noaille

- Coat of arms
- Location of Saint-Pierre-la-Noaille
- Location within France Location within Auvergne-Rhône-Alpes
- Coordinates: 46°10′49″N 4°05′51″E
- Country: France
- Region: Auvergne-Rhône-Alpes
- Department: Loire
- Arrondissement: Roanne
- Canton: Charlieu
- Intercommunality: Charlieu-Belmont

Government
  - Mayor (2020–2026): Alain Aubret
- Area^{1}: 7.21 km^{2} (2.78 sq mi)
- Elevation: 250 m (820 ft)
- Highest elevation: 427 m (1,401 ft)
- Lowest elevation: 253 m (830 ft)
- Population (2023): 378
  - Density: 52.4/km^{2} (136/sq mi)
- Time zone: UTC+01:00 (CET)
  - Summer (DST): UTC+02:00 (CEST)
- INSEE/Postal code: 42273 /42190
- ^{1} French Land Register data, which excludes lakes, ponds, glaciers > 1 km^{2} (0.386 sq mi or 247 acres) and river estuaries.

Saint-Pierre-la-Noaille (French pronunciation: [sɛ̃ pjɛʁ la nɔaj]) is a commune in the Loire department in central France.

== See also ==
- Communes of the Loire department
