= Villers, Loire =

Villers
- Commune
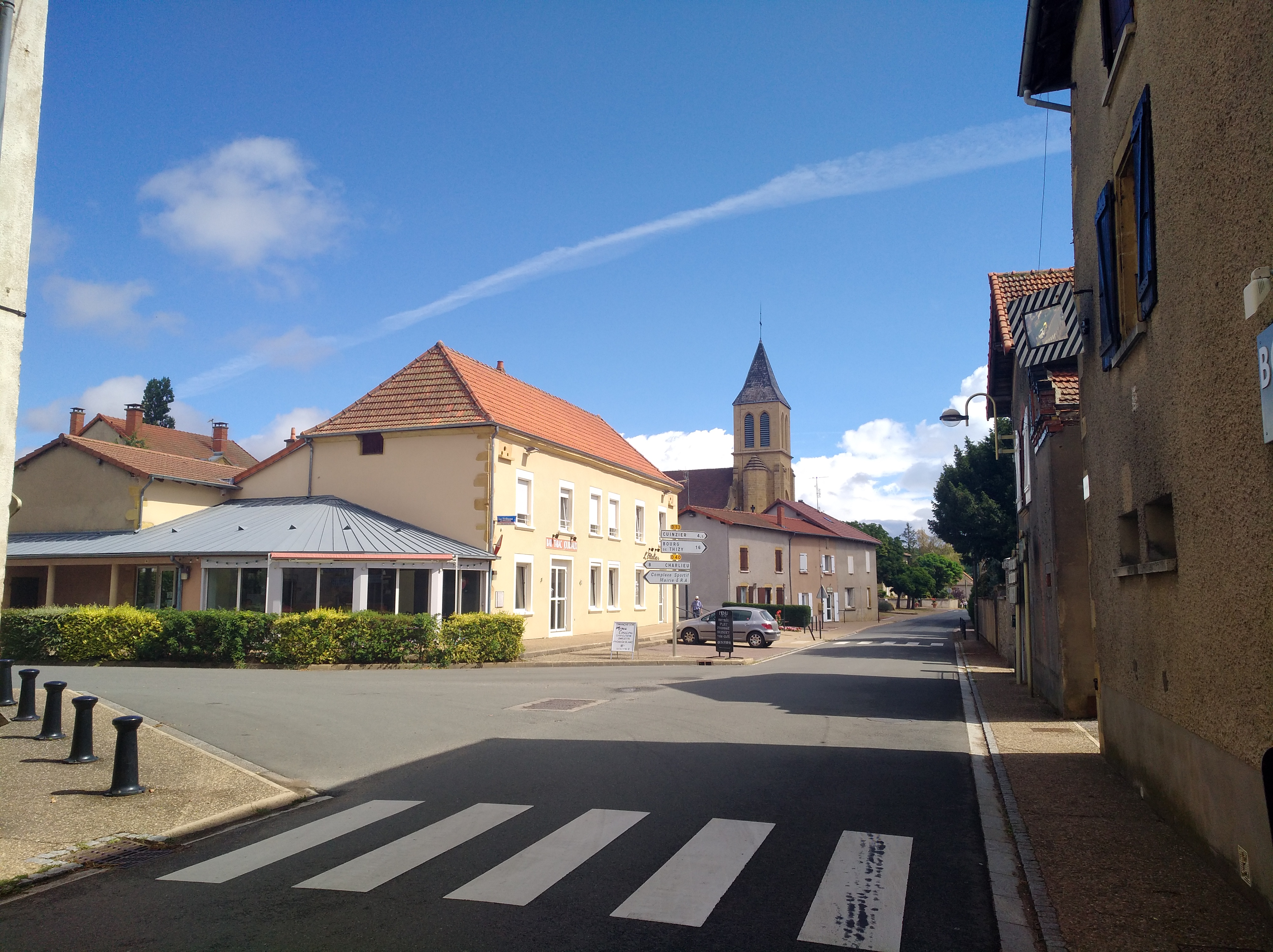
- Location of Villers
- Location within France Location within Auvergne-Rhône-Alpes
- Coordinates: 46°07′20″N 4°13′23″E
- Country: France
- Region: Auvergne-Rhône-Alpes
- Department: Loire
- Arrondissement: Roanne
- Canton: Charlieu
- Intercommunality: Charlieu-Belmont

Government
  - Mayor (2020–2026): Pascal Dubuis
- Area^{1}: 5.73 km^{2} (2.21 sq mi)
- Elevation: 470 m (1,540 ft)
- Highest elevation: 482 m (1,581 ft)
- Lowest elevation: 357 m (1,171 ft)
- Population (2023): 602
  - Density: 105/km^{2} (272/sq mi)
- Time zone: UTC+01:00 (CET)
  - Summer (DST): UTC+02:00 (CEST)
- INSEE/Postal code: 42333 /42460
- ^{1} French Land Register data, which excludes lakes, ponds, glaciers > 1 km^{2} (0.386 sq mi or 247 acres) and river estuaries.

Villers is a commune in the Loire department in central France.

== Population ==
Historical population
Year	Pop.	±% p.a.
1968	382	—
1975	349	−1.28%
1982	447	+3.60%
1990	506	+1.56%
1999	512	+0.13%
2007	552	+0.94%
2012	581	+1.03%
2017	585	+0.14%
2023	602	+0.48%
Source: INSEE

== See also ==
- Communes of the Loire department
