= Saint-Victor-sur-Rhins =

- Commune
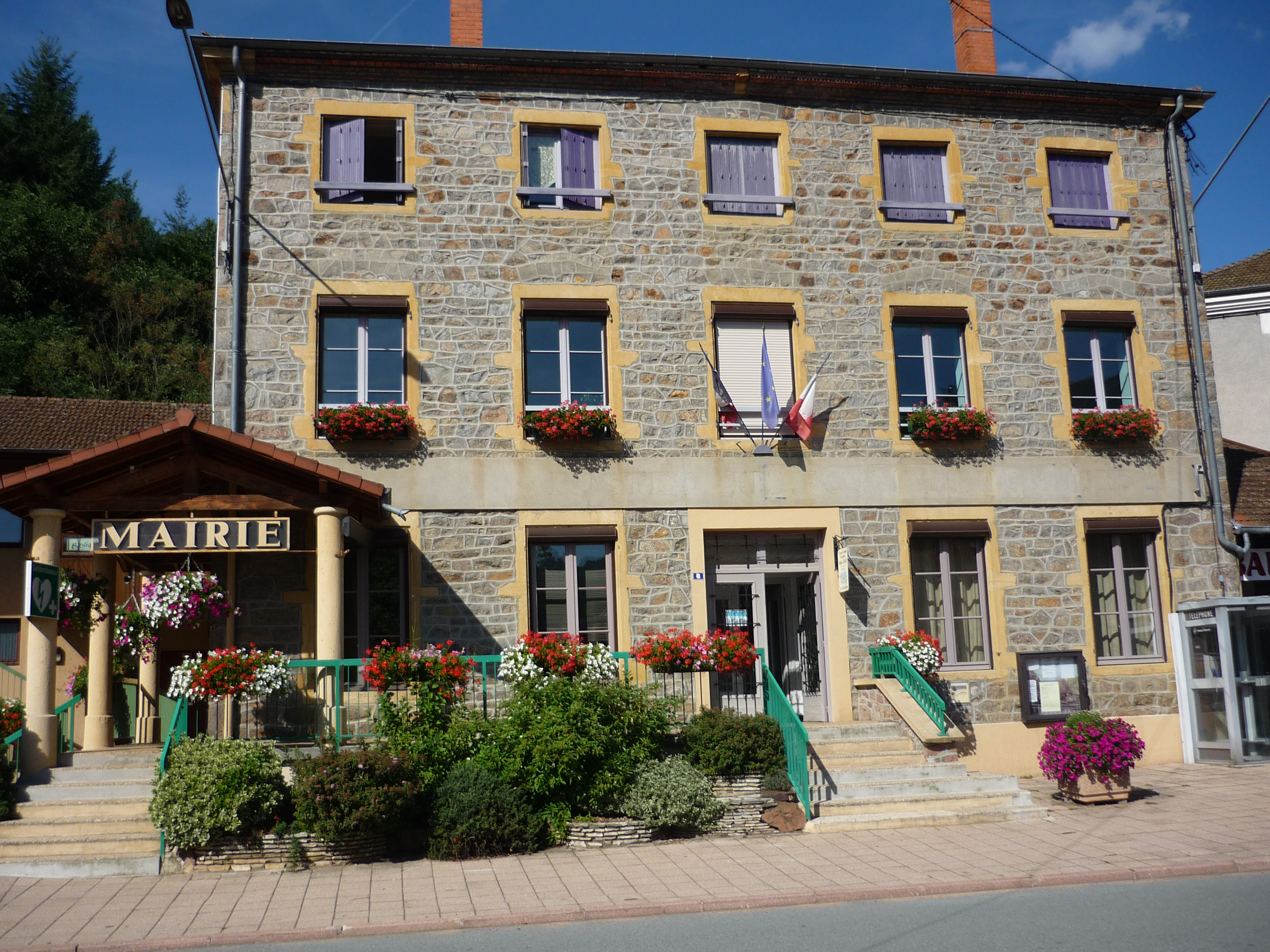
- Town hall

- Coat of arms
- Location of Saint-Victor-sur-Rhins
- Location within France Location within Auvergne-Rhône-Alpes
- Coordinates: 46°00′18″N 4°16′56″E
- Country: France
- Region: Auvergne-Rhône-Alpes
- Department: Loire
- Arrondissement: Roanne
- Canton: Charlieu
- Intercommunality: Pays entre Loire et Rhône

Government
  - Mayor (2026–2032): Timothée Crionay
- Area^{1}: 11.43 km^{2} (4.41 sq mi)
- Elevation: 420 m (1,380 ft)
- Highest elevation: 574 m (1,883 ft)
- Lowest elevation: 330 m (1,080 ft)
- Population (2023): 1,141
  - Density: 99.83/km^{2} (258.5/sq mi)
- Time zone: UTC+01:00 (CET)
  - Summer (DST): UTC+02:00 (CEST)
- INSEE/Postal code: 42293 /42630
- ^{1} French Land Register data, which excludes lakes, ponds, glaciers > 1 km^{2} (0.386 sq mi or 247 acres) and river estuaries.

Saint-Victor-sur-Rhins is a commune in the Loire department in central France.

== Population ==
Historical population
Year	Pop.	±% p.a.
1968	927	—
1975	777	−2.49%
1982	796	+0.35%
1990	872	+1.15%
1999	896	+0.30%
2007	1,041	+1.89%
2012	1,149	+1.99%
2017	1,181	+0.55%
2023	1,141	−0.57%
Source: INSEE

== See also ==
- Communes of the Loire department
