= Régny =

- Commune
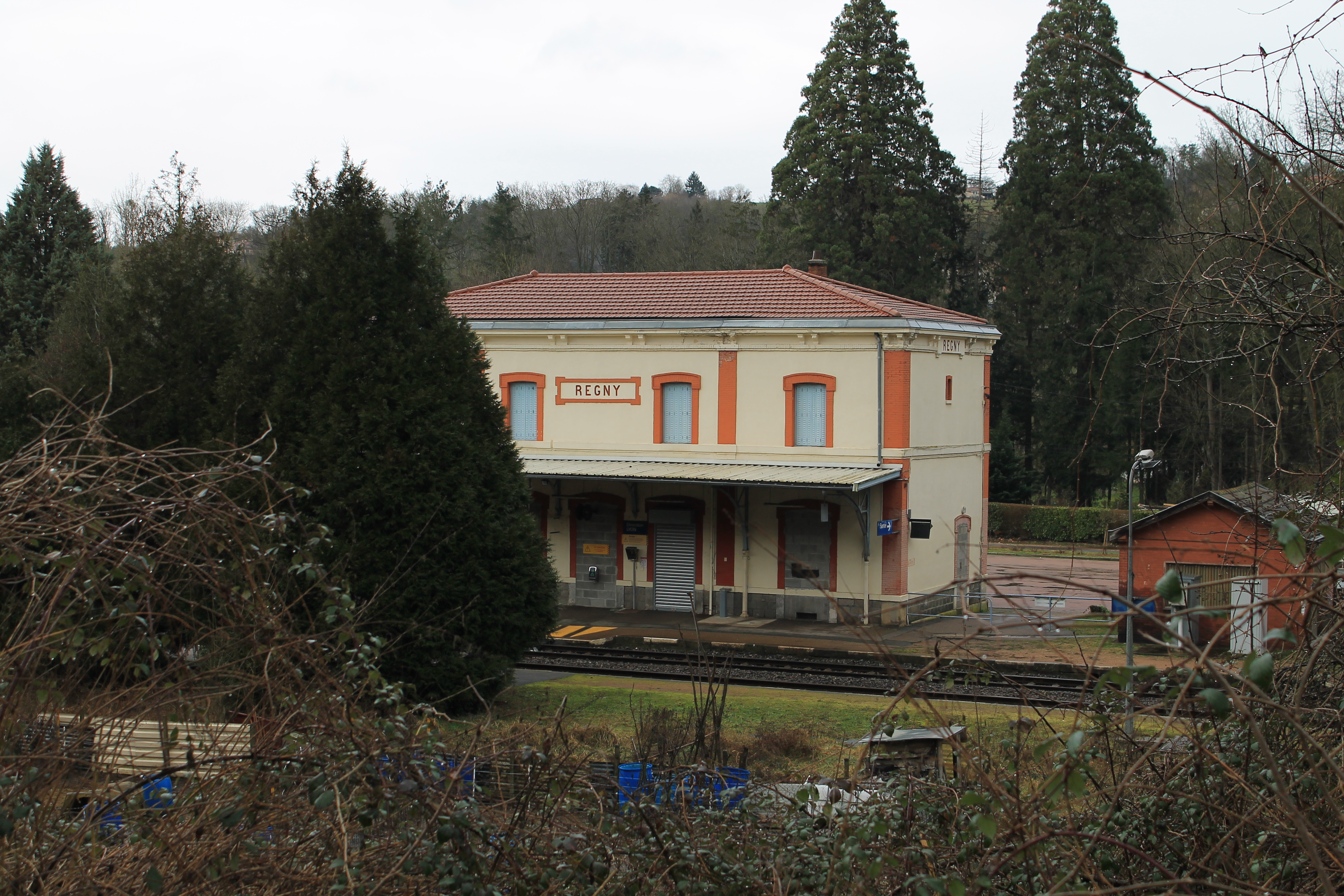
- Railway station

- Coat of arms
- Location of Régny
- Location within France Location within Auvergne-Rhône-Alpes
- Coordinates: 45°59′30″N 4°12′56″E
- Country: France
- Region: Auvergne-Rhône-Alpes
- Department: Loire
- Arrondissement: Roanne
- Canton: Charlieu
- Intercommunality: Pays entre Loire et Rhône

Government
  - Mayor (2020–2026): Jean-François Dauvergne
- Area^{1}: 13.8 km^{2} (5.3 sq mi)
- Elevation: 325 m (1,066 ft)
- Highest elevation: 510 m (1,670 ft)
- Lowest elevation: 305 m (1,001 ft)
- Population (2023): 1,447
  - Density: 105/km^{2} (272/sq mi)
- Time zone: UTC+01:00 (CET)
  - Summer (DST): UTC+02:00 (CEST)
- INSEE/Postal code: 42181 /42630
- ^{1} French Land Register data, which excludes lakes, ponds, glaciers > 1 km^{2} (0.386 sq mi or 247 acres) and river estuaries.

Régny (French pronunciation: [ʁeɲi]) is a commune in the Loire department in central France.

== Population ==
Historical population
Year	Pop.	±% p.a.
1968	2,414	—
1975	2,131	−1.77%
1982	2,041	−0.61%
1990	1,805	−1.52%
1999	1,617	−1.21%
2007	1,501	−0.93%
2012	1,609	+1.40%
2017	1,525	−1.07%
2023	1,447	−0.87%
Source: INSEE

== See also ==
- Communes of the Loire department
