= Boyer, Loire =

Boyer
- Commune
- Location of Boyer
- Location within France Location within Auvergne-Rhône-Alpes
- Coordinates: 46°05′54″N 4°12′37″E
- Country: France
- Region: Auvergne-Rhône-Alpes
- Department: Loire
- Arrondissement: Roanne
- Canton: Charlieu
- Intercommunality: Charlieu-Belmont

Government
  - Mayor (2020–2026): Christine Gasdon
- Area^{1}: 5.18 km^{2} (2.00 sq mi)
- Elevation: 340 m (1,120 ft)
- Highest elevation: 449 m (1,473 ft)
- Lowest elevation: 318 m (1,043 ft)
- Population (2023): 195
  - Density: 37.6/km^{2} (97.5/sq mi)
- Time zone: UTC+01:00 (CET)
  - Summer (DST): UTC+02:00 (CEST)
- INSEE/Postal code: 42025 /42460
- ^{1} French Land Register data, which excludes lakes, ponds, glaciers > 1 km^{2} (0.386 sq mi or 247 acres) and river estuaries.

Boyer (French pronunciation: [bwaje]) is a commune in the Loire department in central France.

== Population ==
Historical population
Year	Pop.	±% p.a.
1968	140	—
1975	126	−1.49%
1982	134	+0.88%
1990	126	−0.77%
1999	158	+2.55%
2007	197	+2.80%
2012	222	+2.42%
2017	199	−2.16%
2023	195	−0.34%
Source: INSEE

== See also ==
- Communes of the Loire department
