= Jarnosse =

- Commune
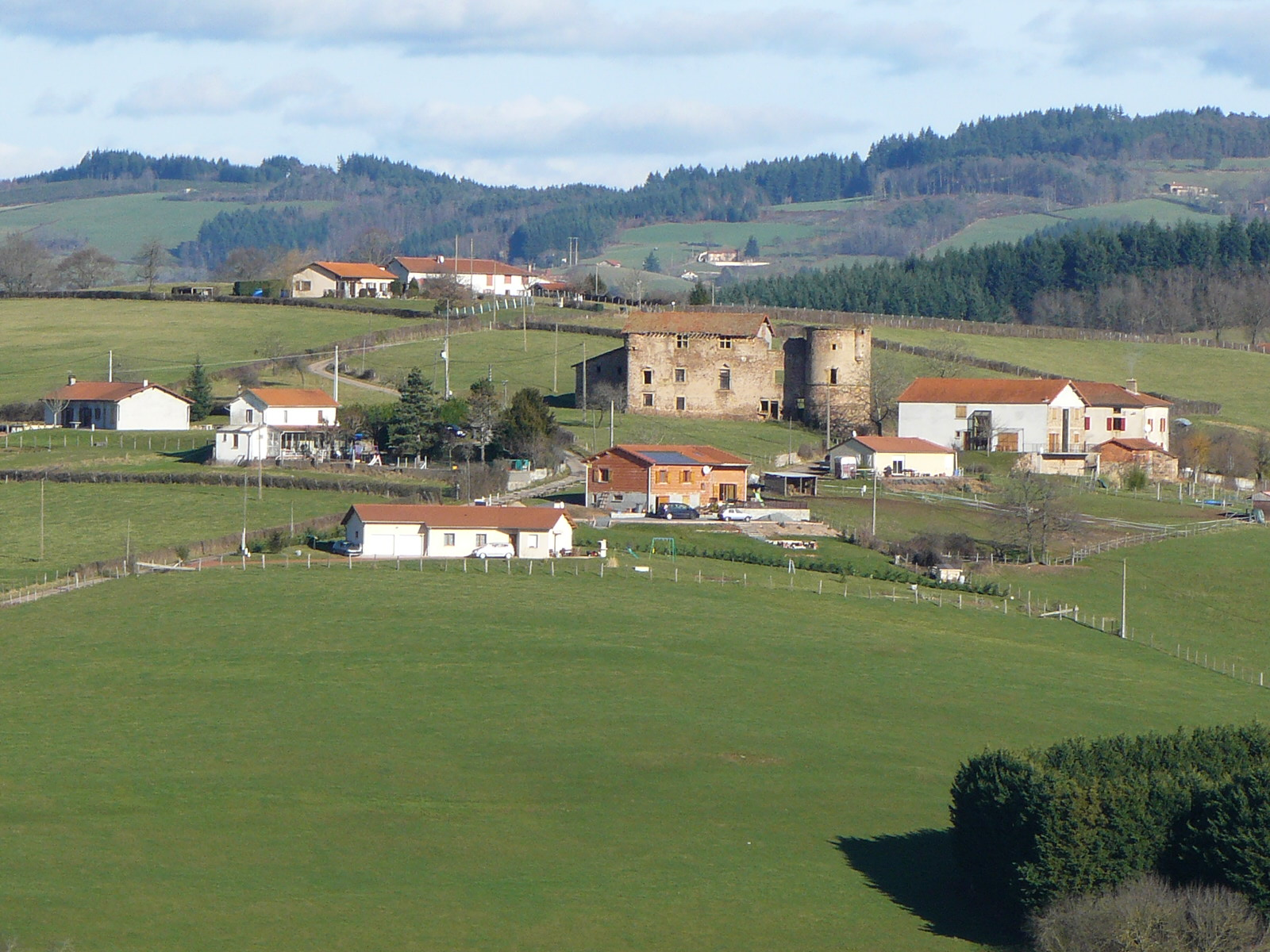

- Coat of arms
- Location of Jarnosse
- Location within France Location within Auvergne-Rhône-Alpes
- Coordinates: 46°06′35″N 4°13′59″E
- Country: France
- Region: Auvergne-Rhône-Alpes
- Department: Loire
- Arrondissement: Roanne
- Canton: Charlieu

Government
  - Mayor (2020–2026): Jean-Marc Lombard
- Area^{1}: 11.88 km^{2} (4.59 sq mi)
- Elevation: 360 m (1,180 ft)
- Highest elevation: 570 m (1,870 ft)
- Lowest elevation: 344 m (1,129 ft)
- Population (2023): 410
  - Density: 35/km^{2} (89/sq mi)
- Time zone: UTC+01:00 (CET)
  - Summer (DST): UTC+02:00 (CEST)
- INSEE/Postal code: 42112 /42460
- ^{1} French Land Register data, which excludes lakes, ponds, glaciers > 1 km^{2} (0.386 sq mi or 247 acres) and river estuaries.

Jarnosse (French pronunciation: [ʒaʁnɔs]) is a commune in the department of Loire in the Auvergne-Rhône-Alpes Region of central France.

== Population ==
Historical population
Year	Pop.	±% p.a.
1968	329	—
1975	303	−1.17%
1982	344	+1.83%
1990	371	+0.95%
1999	354	−0.52%
2007	406	+1.73%
2012	423	+0.82%
2017	435	+0.56%
2023	410	−0.98%
Source: INSEE

== See also ==
- Communes of the Loire department
