= Maizilly =

- Commune
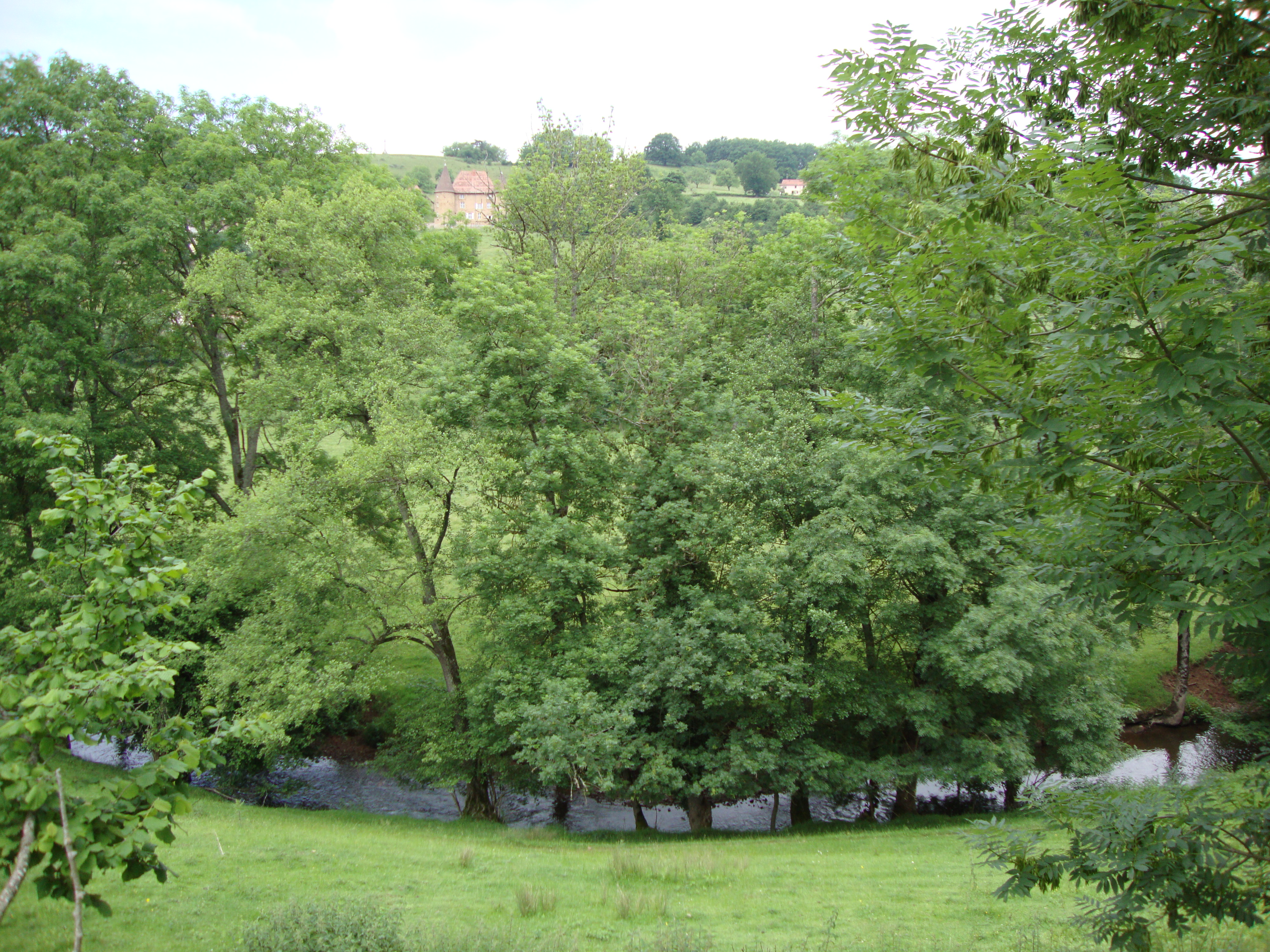

- Coat of arms
- Location of Maizilly
- Location within France Location within Auvergne-Rhône-Alpes
- Coordinates: 46°10′46″N 4°14′44″E
- Country: France
- Region: Auvergne-Rhône-Alpes
- Department: Loire
- Arrondissement: Roanne
- Canton: Charlieu

Government
  - Mayor (2020–2026): Colette Lebeau
- Area^{1}: 5.12 km^{2} (1.98 sq mi)
- Elevation: 405 m (1,329 ft)
- Highest elevation: 483 m (1,585 ft)
- Lowest elevation: 285 m (935 ft)
- Population (2023): 317
  - Density: 61.9/km^{2} (160/sq mi)
- Time zone: UTC+01:00 (CET)
  - Summer (DST): UTC+02:00 (CEST)
- INSEE/Postal code: 42131 /42750
- ^{1} French Land Register data, which excludes lakes, ponds, glaciers > 1 km^{2} (0.386 sq mi or 247 acres) and river estuaries.

Maizilly (French pronunciation: [mɛziji]) is a commune in the Loire department in central France.

== Population ==
Historical population
Year	Pop.	±% p.a.
1968	347	—
1975	291	−2.48%
1982	283	−0.40%
1990	273	−0.45%
1999	296	+0.90%
2007	319	+0.94%
2012	346	+1.64%
2017	337	−0.53%
2023	317	−1.01%
Source: INSEE

== See also ==
- Communes of the Loire department
