= Nandax =

Nandax Lendâs (Arpitan)
- Commune
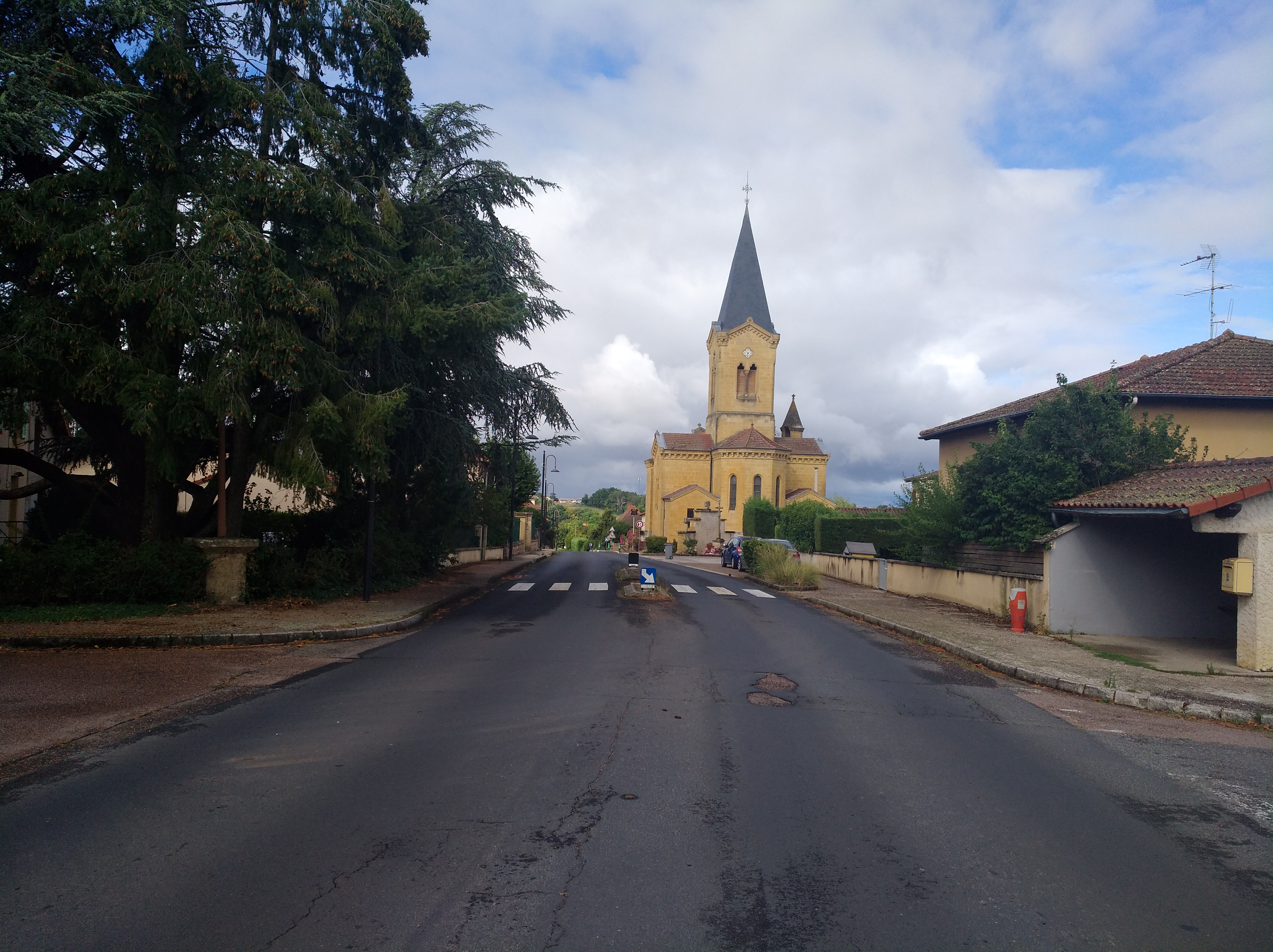

- Coat of arms
- Location of Nandax
- Location within France Location within Auvergne-Rhône-Alpes
- Coordinates: 46°05′57″N 4°09′57″E
- Country: France
- Region: Auvergne-Rhône-Alpes
- Department: Loire
- Arrondissement: Roanne
- Canton: Charlieu

Government
  - Mayor (2020–2026): Roger Sandri
- Area^{1}: 8.03 km^{2} (3.10 sq mi)
- Elevation: 310 m (1,020 ft)
- Highest elevation: 413 m (1,355 ft)
- Lowest elevation: 281 m (922 ft)
- Population (2023): 564
  - Density: 70.2/km^{2} (182/sq mi)
- Time zone: UTC+01:00 (CET)
  - Summer (DST): UTC+02:00 (CEST)
- INSEE/Postal code: 42152 /42720
- ^{1} French Land Register data, which excludes lakes, ponds, glaciers > 1 km^{2} (0.386 sq mi or 247 acres) and river estuaries.

Nandax (French pronunciation: [nɑ̃da]; Arpitan: Lendâs [lẽ.ˈdɒ]) is a commune in the Loire department in central France.

== Population ==
Historical population
Year	Pop.	±% p.a.
1968	259	—
1975	234	−1.44%
1982	267	+1.90%
1990	283	+0.73%
1999	333	+1.82%
2007	489	+4.92%
2012	551	+2.42%
2017	521	−1.11%
2023	564	+1.33%
Source: INSEE

== See also ==
- Communes of the Loire department
