= Saint-Denis-de-Cabanne =

- Commune
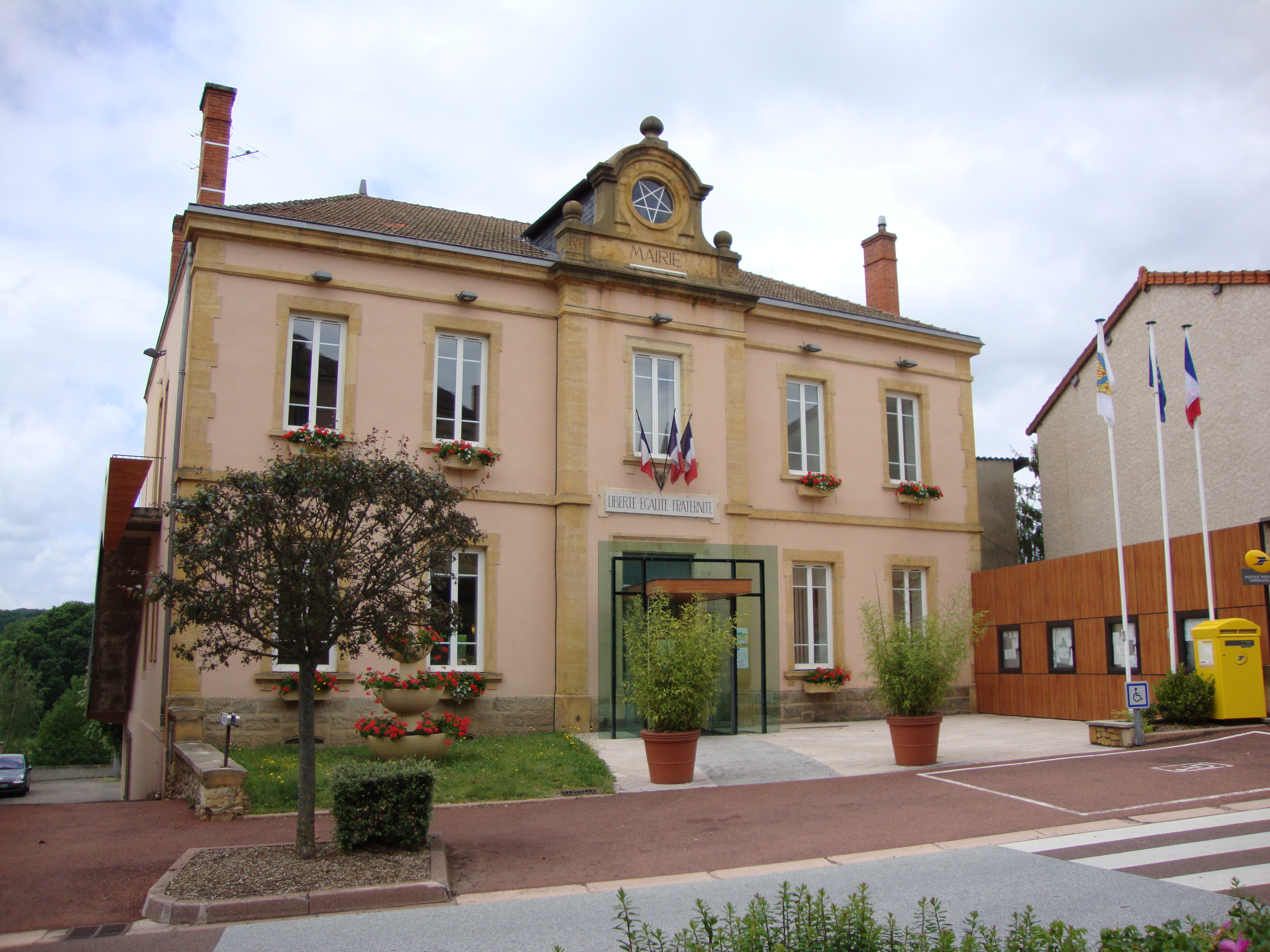
- Town hall

- Coat of arms
- Location of Saint-Denis-de-Cabanne
- Location within France Location within Auvergne-Rhône-Alpes
- Coordinates: 46°10′30″N 4°12′46″E
- Country: France
- Region: Auvergne-Rhône-Alpes
- Department: Loire
- Arrondissement: Roanne
- Canton: Charlieu

Government
  - Mayor (2020–2026): René Valorge
- Area^{1}: 7.65 km^{2} (2.95 sq mi)
- Elevation: 285 m (935 ft)
- Highest elevation: 423 m (1,388 ft)
- Lowest elevation: 273 m (896 ft)
- Population (2023): 1,246
  - Density: 163/km^{2} (422/sq mi)
- Time zone: UTC+01:00 (CET)
  - Summer (DST): UTC+02:00 (CEST)
- INSEE/Postal code: 42215 /42750
- ^{1} French Land Register data, which excludes lakes, ponds, glaciers > 1 km^{2} (0.386 sq mi or 247 acres) and river estuaries.

Saint-Denis-de-Cabanne (French pronunciation: [sɛ̃ dəni də kaban]) is a commune in the Loire department in central France.

== Population ==
Historical population
Year	Pop.	±% p.a.
1968	1,413	—
1975	1,431	+0.18%
1982	1,416	−0.15%
1990	1,357	−0.53%
1999	1,293	−0.54%
2007	1,292	−0.01%
2012	1,291	−0.02%
2017	1,251	−0.63%
2023	1,246	−0.07%
Source: INSEE

== See also ==
- Communes of the Loire department
