= Combre =

- Commune
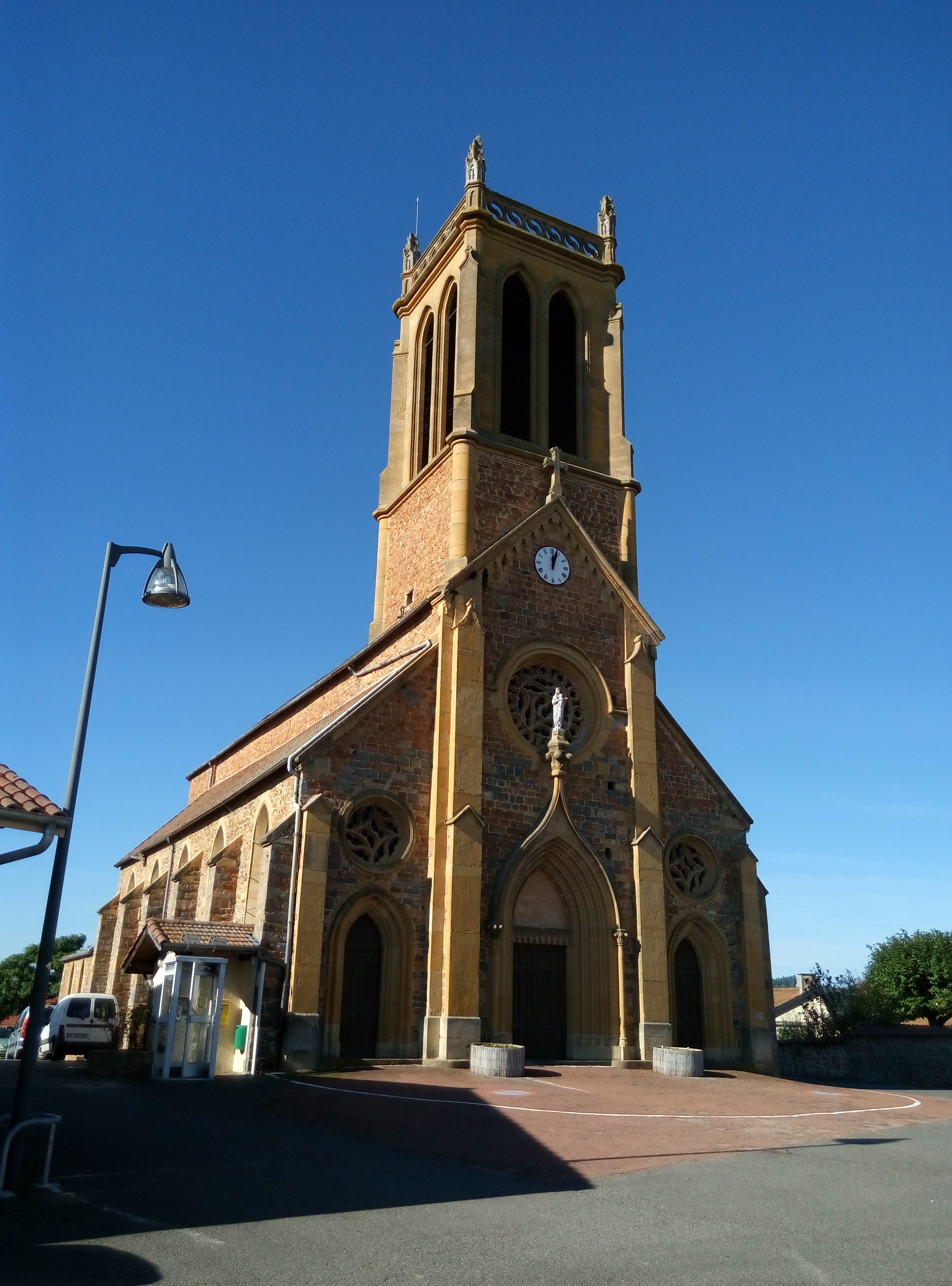

- Coat of arms
- Location of Combre
- Location within France Location within Auvergne-Rhône-Alpes
- Coordinates: 46°01′35″N 4°15′52″E
- Country: France
- Region: Auvergne-Rhône-Alpes
- Department: Loire
- Arrondissement: Roanne
- Canton: Charlieu
- Intercommunality: Roannais Agglomération

Government
  - Mayor (2020–2026): Alain Rossetti
- Area^{1}: 4.01 km^{2} (1.55 sq mi)
- Elevation: 454 m (1,490 ft)
- Highest elevation: 482 m (1,581 ft)
- Lowest elevation: 334 m (1,096 ft)
- Population (2023): 411
  - Density: 102/km^{2} (265/sq mi)
- Time zone: UTC+01:00 (CET)
  - Summer (DST): UTC+02:00 (CEST)
- INSEE/Postal code: 42068 /42840
- ^{1} French Land Register data, which excludes lakes, ponds, glaciers > 1 km^{2} (0.386 sq mi or 247 acres) and river estuaries.

Combre (French pronunciation: [kɔ̃bʁ]) is a commune in the Loire department in central France.

== Population ==
Historical population
Year	Pop.	±% p.a.
1968	169	—
1975	151	−1.60%
1982	182	+2.70%
1990	267	+4.91%
1999	283	+0.65%
2007	356	+2.91%
2012	434	+4.04%
2017	439	+0.23%
2023	411	−1.09%
Source: INSEE

== See also ==
- Communes of the Loire department
