= Pradines, Loire =

Pradines
- Commune
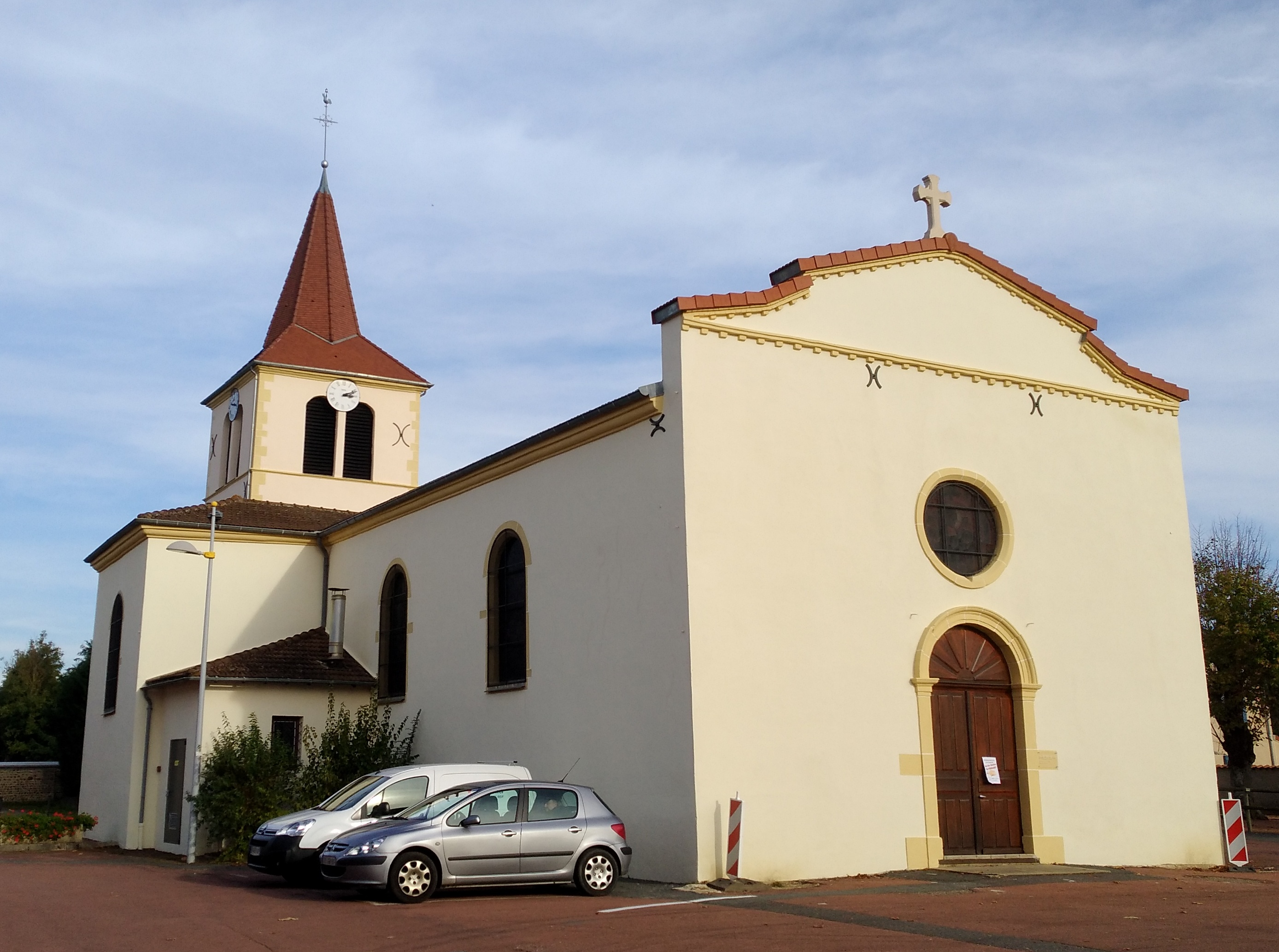
- Location of Pradines
- Location within France Location within Auvergne-Rhône-Alpes
- Coordinates: 45°59′57″N 4°10′38″E
- Country: France
- Region: Auvergne-Rhône-Alpes
- Department: Loire
- Arrondissement: Roanne
- Canton: Charlieu
- Intercommunality: Pays entre Loire et Rhône

Government
  - Mayor (2020–2026): Charles Brun
- Area^{1}: 11.6 km^{2} (4.5 sq mi)
- Elevation: 450 m (1,480 ft)
- Highest elevation: 459 m (1,506 ft)
- Lowest elevation: 302 m (991 ft)
- Population (2023): 918
  - Density: 79.1/km^{2} (205/sq mi)
- Time zone: UTC+01:00 (CET)
  - Summer (DST): UTC+02:00 (CEST)
- INSEE/Postal code: 42178 /42630
- ^{1} French Land Register data, which excludes lakes, ponds, glaciers > 1 km^{2} (0.386 sq mi or 247 acres) and river estuaries.

Pradines (French pronunciation: [pʁadin]) is a commune in the Loire department in central France.

== Population ==
Historical population
Year	Pop.	±% p.a.
1968	483	—
1975	502	+0.55%
1982	498	−0.11%
1990	604	+2.44%
1999	608	+0.07%
2007	644	+0.72%
2012	748	+3.04%
2017	803	+1.43%
2023	918	+2.26%
Source: INSEE

== See also ==
- Communes of the Loire department
