= Mars, Loire =

Mars
- Commune
- Coat of arms
- Location of Mars
- Location within France Location within Auvergne-Rhône-Alpes
- Coordinates: 46°09′14″N 4°14′49″E
- Country: France
- Region: Auvergne-Rhône-Alpes
- Department: Loire
- Arrondissement: Roanne
- Canton: Charlieu
- Intercommunality: Charlieu-Belmont

Government
  - Mayor (2020–2026): Jérôme Viodrin
- Area^{1}: 12.03 km^{2} (4.64 sq mi)
- Elevation: 390 m (1,280 ft)
- Highest elevation: 592 m (1,942 ft)
- Lowest elevation: 331 m (1,086 ft)
- Population (2023): 555
  - Density: 46.1/km^{2} (119/sq mi)
- Time zone: UTC+01:00 (CET)
  - Summer (DST): UTC+02:00 (CEST)
- INSEE/Postal code: 42141 /42750
- ^{1} French Land Register data, which excludes lakes, ponds, glaciers > 1 km^{2} (0.386 sq mi or 247 acres) and river estuaries.

Mars is a commune in the Loire department in central France.

== Population ==
Historical population
Year	Pop.	±% p.a.
1968	504	—
1975	518	+0.39%
1982	524	+0.16%
1990	533	+0.21%
1999	551	+0.37%
2007	553	+0.05%
2012	562	+0.32%
2017	560	−0.07%
2023	555	−0.15%
Source: INSEE

== See also ==
- Communes of the Loire department
