= Vougy, Loire =

Vougy
- Commune
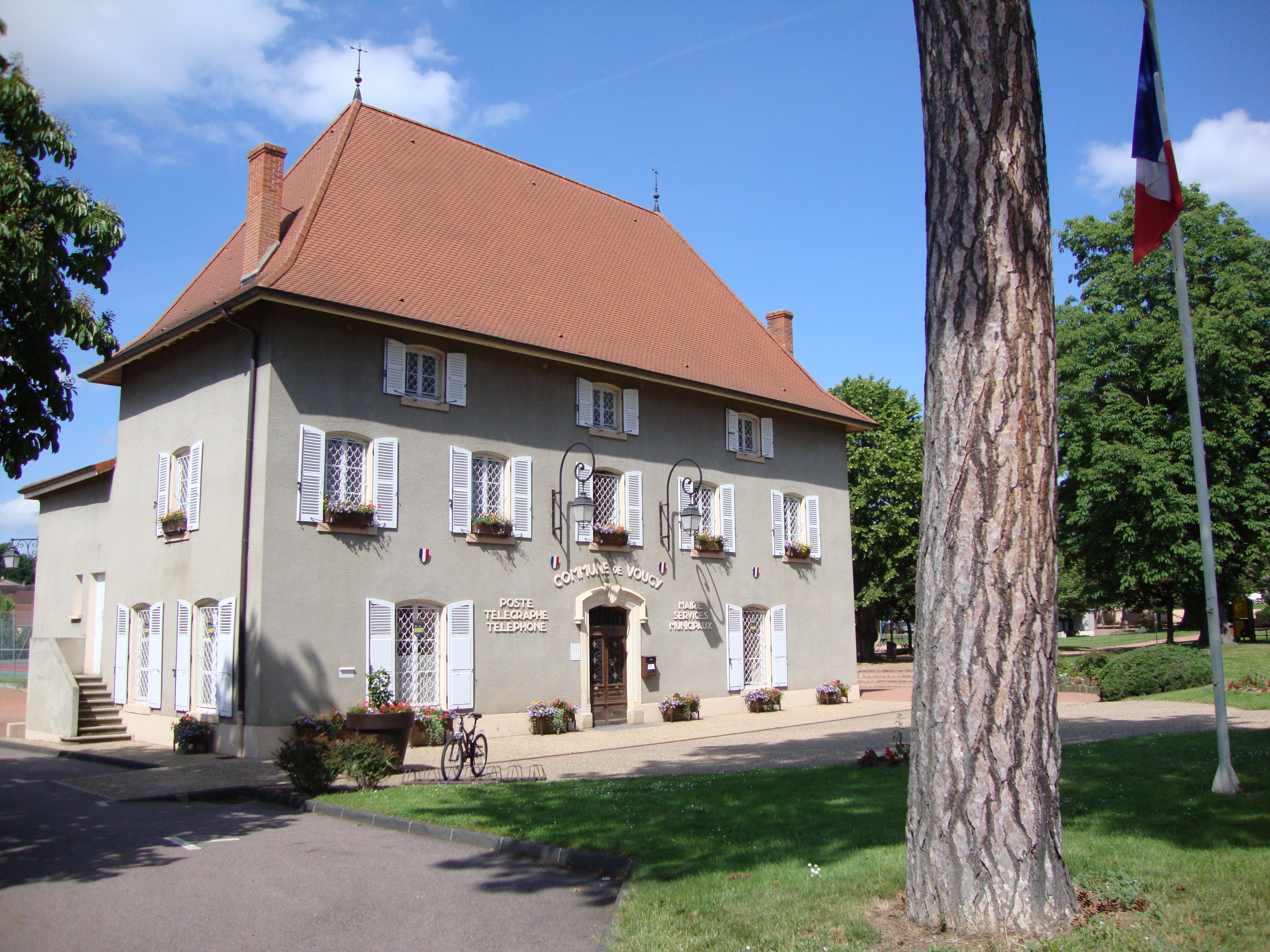
- Town hall

- Coat of arms
- Location of Vougy
- Location within France Location within Auvergne-Rhône-Alpes
- Coordinates: 46°06′15″N 4°07′11″E
- Country: France
- Region: Auvergne-Rhône-Alpes
- Department: Loire
- Arrondissement: Roanne
- Canton: Charlieu
- Intercommunality: Charlieu-Belmont

Government
  - Mayor (2020–2026): Bernard Moulin
- Area^{1}: 20.9 km^{2} (8.1 sq mi)
- Elevation: 280 m (920 ft)
- Highest elevation: 368 m (1,207 ft)
- Lowest elevation: 256 m (840 ft)
- Population (2023): 1,546
  - Density: 74.0/km^{2} (192/sq mi)
- Time zone: UTC+01:00 (CET)
  - Summer (DST): UTC+02:00 (CEST)
- INSEE/Postal code: 42338 /42720
- ^{1} French Land Register data, which excludes lakes, ponds, glaciers > 1 km^{2} (0.386 sq mi or 247 acres) and river estuaries.

Vougy (French pronunciation: [vuʒi]) is a commune in the Loire department in central France.

== Population ==
Historical population
Year	Pop.	±% p.a.
1968	1,073	—
1975	1,211	+1.74%
1982	1,551	+3.60%
1990	1,604	+0.42%
1999	1,499	−0.75%
2007	1,429	−0.60%
2012	1,415	−0.20%
2017	1,466	+0.71%
2023	1,546	+0.89%
Source: INSEE

== See also ==
- Communes of the Loire department
