= Cuinzier =

- Commune
- Coat of arms
- Location of Cuinzier
- Location within France Location within Auvergne-Rhône-Alpes
- Coordinates: 46°07′42″N 4°16′03″E
- Country: France
- Region: Auvergne-Rhône-Alpes
- Department: Loire
- Arrondissement: Roanne
- Canton: Charlieu
- Intercommunality: Charlieu-Belmont Communauté

Government
  - Mayor (2020–2026): Marc Lapallus
- Area^{1}: 5.62 km^{2} (2.17 sq mi)
- Elevation: 496 m (1,627 ft)
- Highest elevation: 610 m (2,000 ft)
- Lowest elevation: 389 m (1,276 ft)
- Population (2023): 707
  - Density: 126/km^{2} (326/sq mi)
- Time zone: UTC+01:00 (CET)
  - Summer (DST): UTC+02:00 (CEST)
- INSEE/Postal code: 42079 /42460
- ^{1} French Land Register data, which excludes lakes, ponds, glaciers > 1 km^{2} (0.386 sq mi or 247 acres) and river estuaries.

Cuinzier (French pronunciation: [kɛ̃zje]) is a commune in the Loire department in central France.

== Population ==
Historical population
Year	Pop.	±% p.a.
1968	605	—
1975	598	−0.17%
1982	571	−0.66%
1990	583	+0.26%
1999	590	+0.13%
2007	598	+0.17%
2012	685	+2.75%
2017	728	+1.23%
2023	707	−0.49%
Source: INSEE

== See also ==
- Communes of the Loire department
