= Belleroche =

- Commune
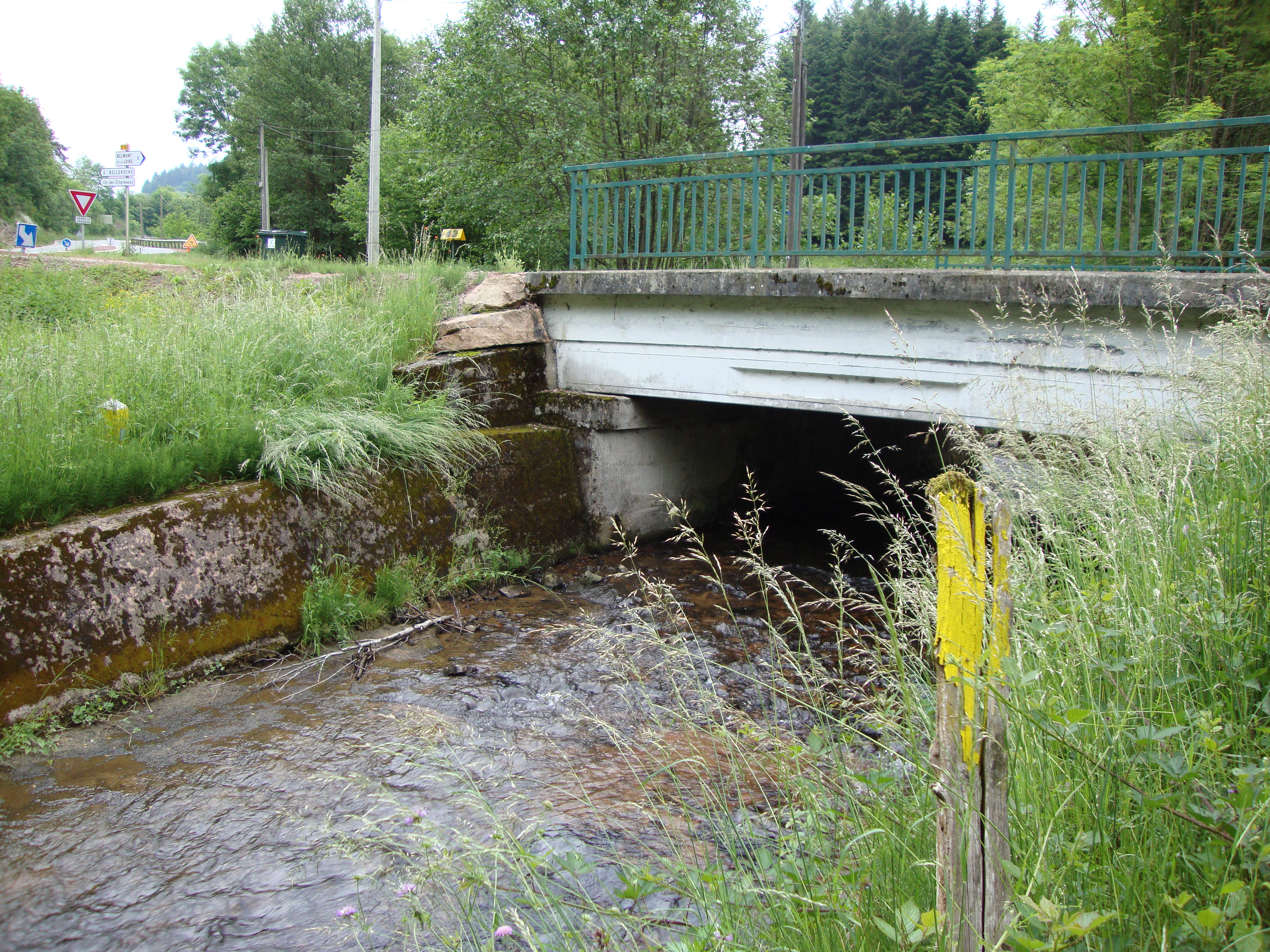
- Bridge over the Botoret

- Coat of arms
- Location of Belleroche
- Location within France Location within Auvergne-Rhône-Alpes
- Coordinates: 46°10′09″N 4°24′39″E
- Country: France
- Region: Auvergne-Rhône-Alpes
- Department: Loire
- Arrondissement: Roanne
- Canton: Charlieu
- Intercommunality: Charlieu-Belmont

Government
  - Mayor (2020–2026): Bernard Chignier
- Area^{1}: 13.93 km^{2} (5.38 sq mi)
- Elevation: 650 m (2,130 ft)
- Highest elevation: 881 m (2,890 ft)
- Lowest elevation: 473 m (1,552 ft)
- Population (2023): 313
  - Density: 22.5/km^{2} (58.2/sq mi)
- Time zone: UTC+01:00 (CET)
  - Summer (DST): UTC+02:00 (CEST)
- INSEE/Postal code: 42014 /42670
- ^{1} French Land Register data, which excludes lakes, ponds, glaciers > 1 km^{2} (0.386 sq mi or 247 acres) and river estuaries.

Belleroche (French pronunciation: [bɛlʁɔʃ]) is a commune in the Loire department in central France.

== Population ==
Historical population
Year	Pop.	±% p.a.
1968	346	—
1975	301	−1.97%
1982	284	−0.83%
1990	232	−2.50%
1999	211	−1.05%
2007	256	+2.45%
2012	273	+1.29%
2017	312	+2.71%
2023	313	+0.05%
Source: INSEE

== See also ==
- Communes of the Loire department
