= Sevelinges =

- Commune
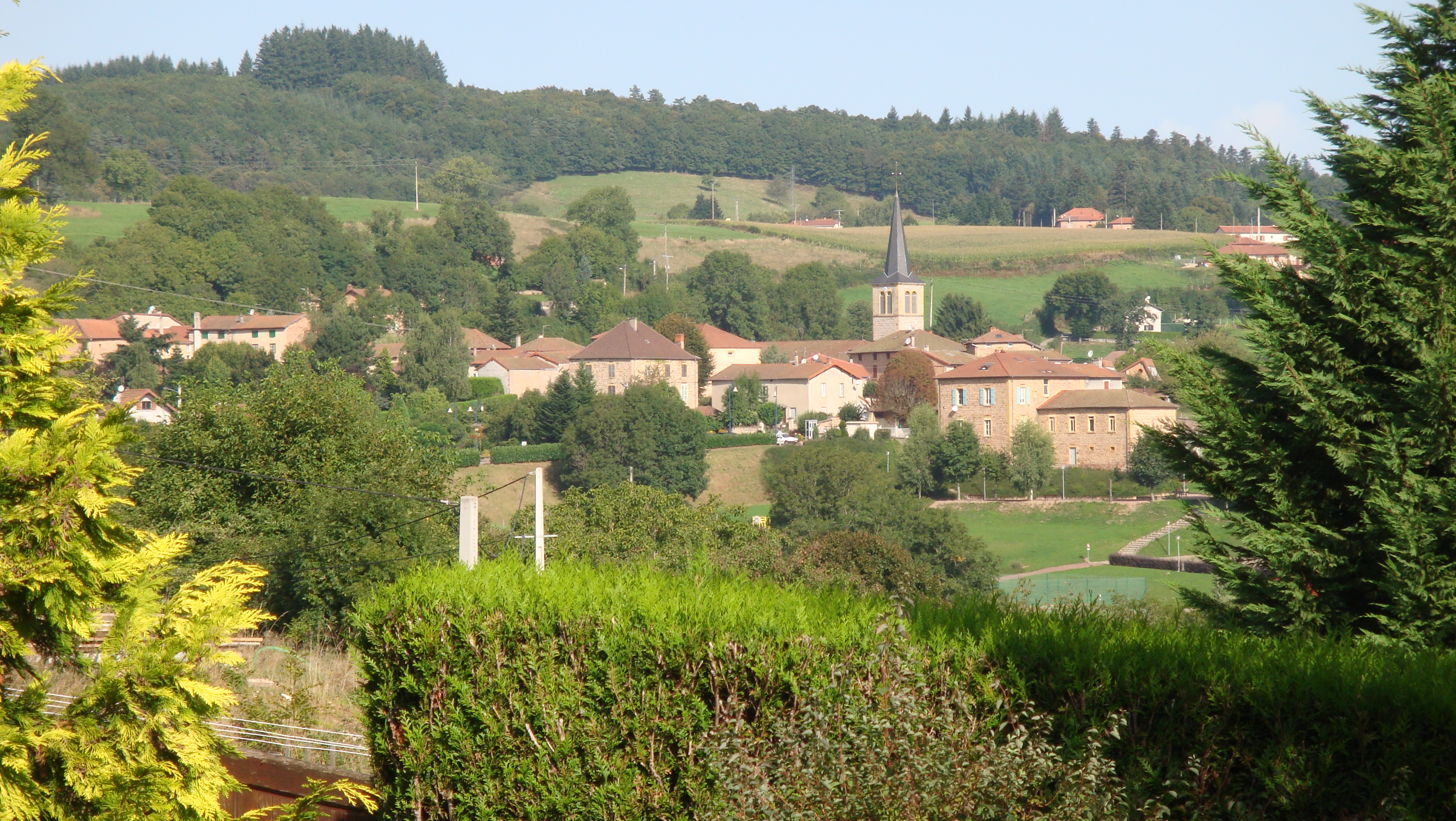
- An panoramic view of Sevelinges

- Coat of arms
- Location of Sevelinges
- Location within France Location within Auvergne-Rhône-Alpes
- Coordinates: 46°05′57″N 4°17′48″E
- Country: France
- Region: Auvergne-Rhône-Alpes
- Department: Loire
- Arrondissement: Roanne
- Canton: Charlieu

Government
  - Mayor (2020–2026): Dominique Palluet
- Area^{1}: 8.19 km^{2} (3.16 sq mi)
- Elevation: 570 m (1,870 ft)
- Highest elevation: 682 m (2,238 ft)
- Lowest elevation: 397 m (1,302 ft)
- Population (2023): 646
  - Density: 78.9/km^{2} (204/sq mi)
- Time zone: UTC+01:00 (CET)
  - Summer (DST): UTC+02:00 (CEST)
- INSEE/Postal code: 42300 /42460
- ^{1} French Land Register data, which excludes lakes, ponds, glaciers > 1 km^{2} (0.386 sq mi or 247 acres) and river estuaries.

Sevelinges (French pronunciation: [səvlɛ̃ʒ]) is a commune in the Loire department in central France.

== Population ==
Historical population
Year	Pop.	±% p.a.
1968	600	—
1975	502	−2.52%
1982	503	+0.03%
1990	584	+1.88%
1999	582	−0.04%
2007	626	+0.92%
2012	663	+1.16%
2017	647	−0.49%
2023	646	−0.03%
Source: INSEE

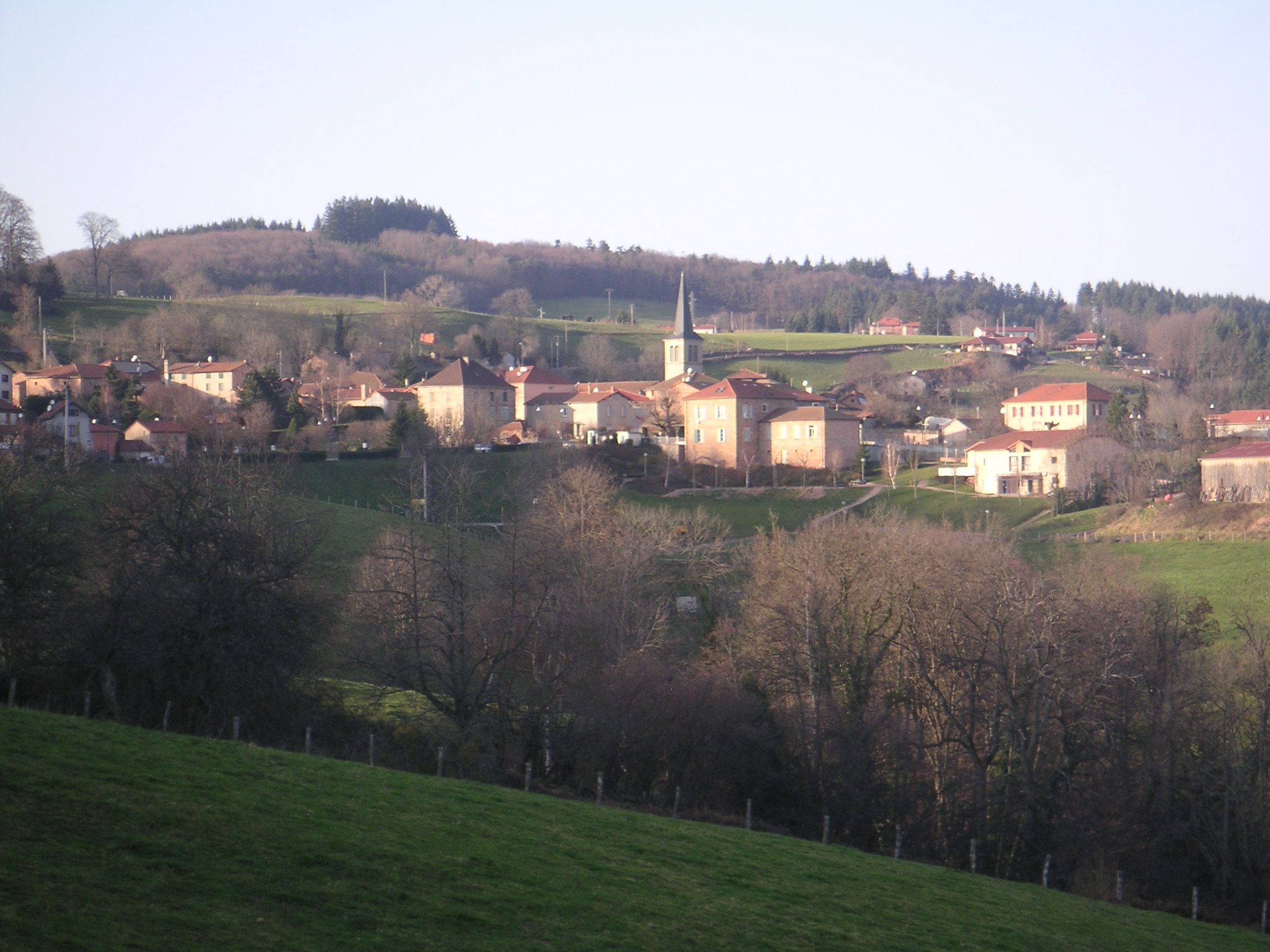
Sevelinges, view from the south, in autumn

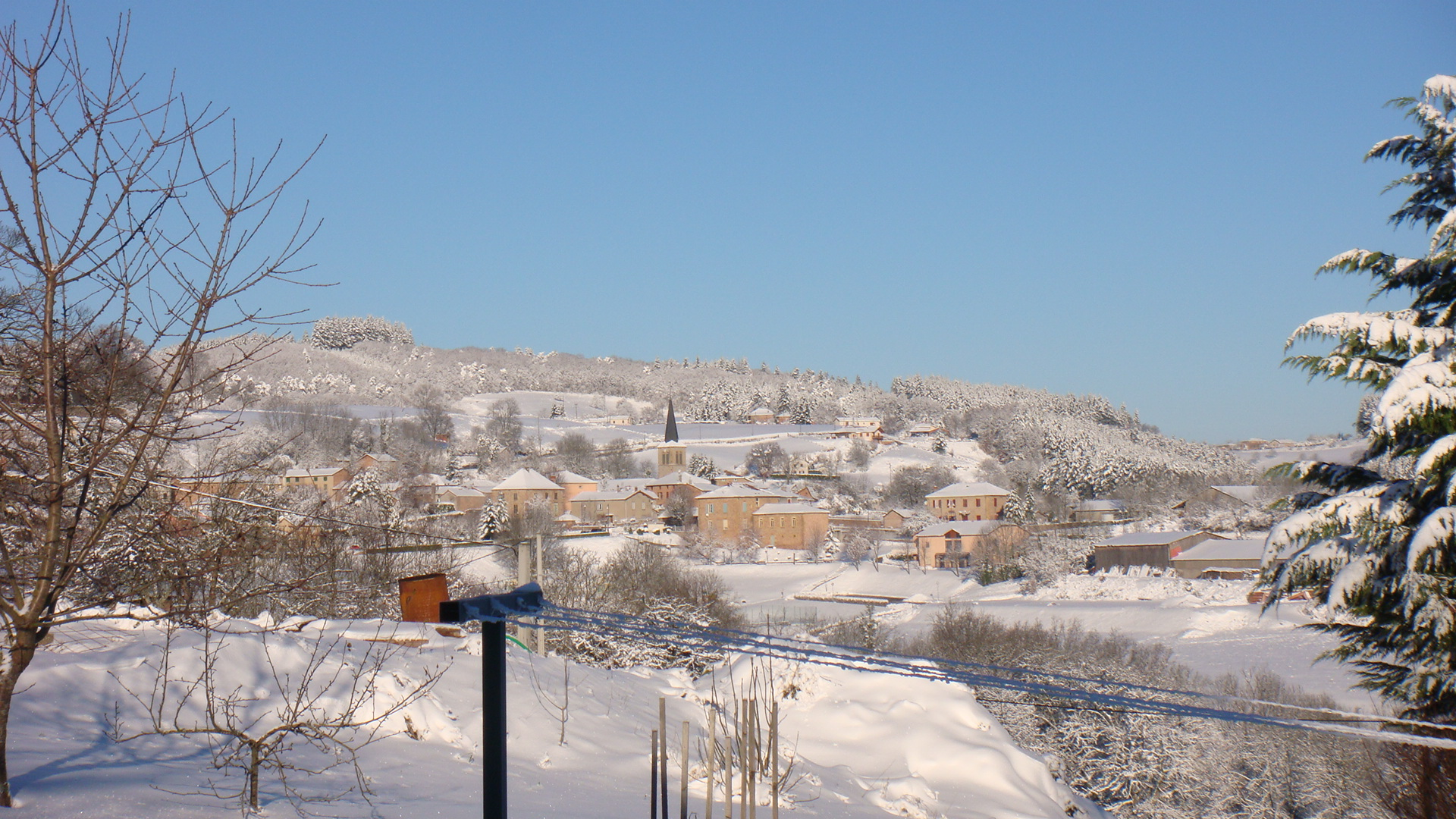
Sevelinges, view from the south, in winter

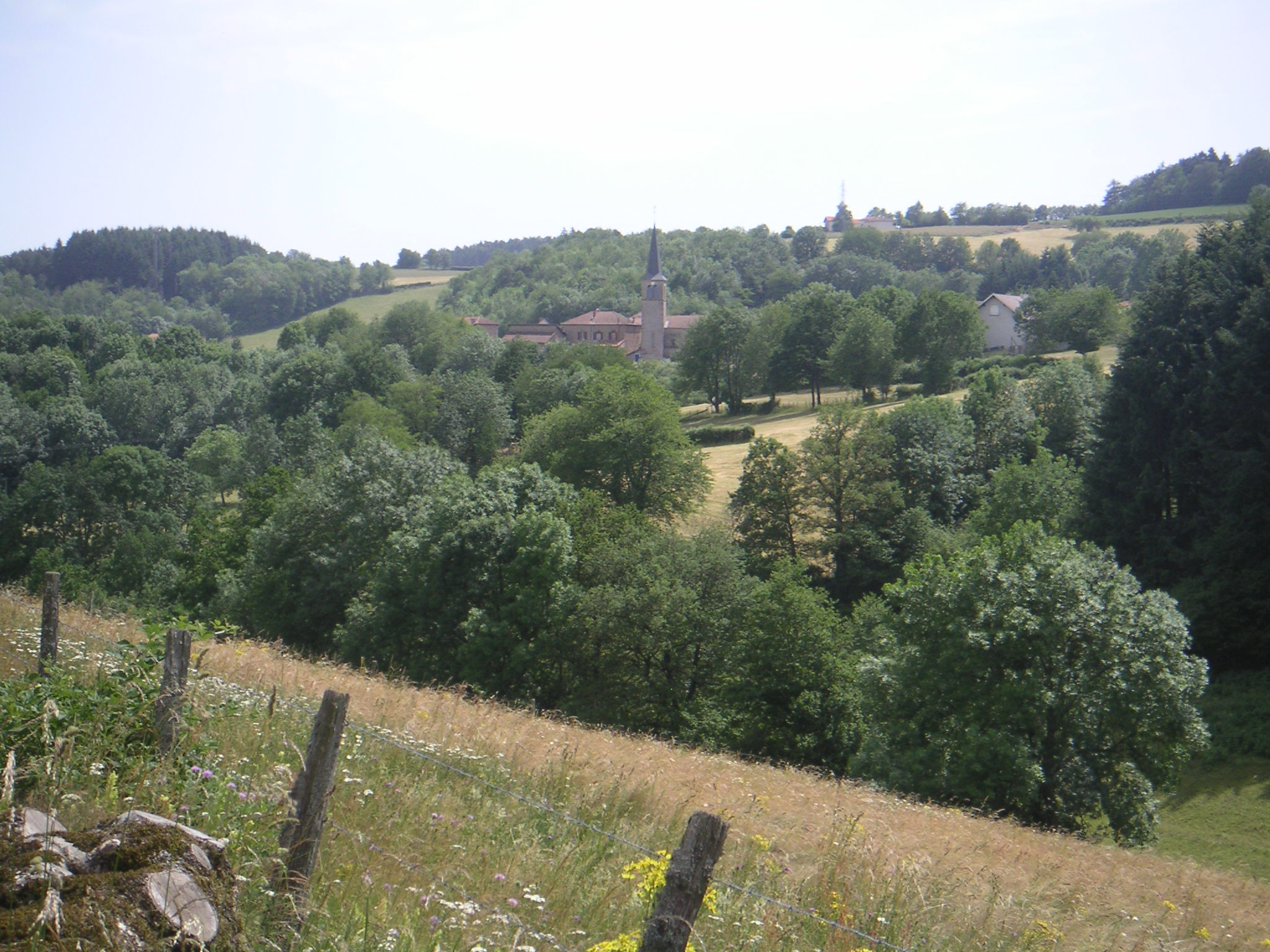
Sevelinges, view from the north-east

== See also ==
- Communes of the Loire department
