= Le Cergne =

- Commune
- Coat of arms
- Location of Le Cergne
- Location within France Location within Auvergne-Rhône-Alpes
- Coordinates: 46°07′19″N 4°18′25″E
- Country: France
- Region: Auvergne-Rhône-Alpes
- Department: Loire
- Arrondissement: Roanne
- Canton: Charlieu

Government
  - Mayor (2020–2026): Hélène Vaginay
- Area^{1}: 5.93 km^{2} (2.29 sq mi)
- Highest elevation: 787 m (2,582 ft)
- Lowest elevation: 476 m (1,562 ft)
- Population (2023): 622
  - Density: 105/km^{2} (272/sq mi)
- Time zone: UTC+01:00 (CET)
  - Summer (DST): UTC+02:00 (CEST)
- INSEE/Postal code: 42033 /42460
- ^{1} French Land Register data, which excludes lakes, ponds, glaciers > 1 km^{2} (0.386 sq mi or 247 acres) and river estuaries.

Le Cergne (French pronunciation: [lə sɛʁɲ]) is a commune in the Loire department in central France.

== Population ==
Historical population
| Year | Pop. | ±% p.a. |
|---|---|---|
| 1968 | 475 | — |
| 1975 | 476 | +0.03% |
| 1982 | 569 | +2.58% |
| 1990 | 650 | +1.68% |
| 1999 | 698 | +0.79% |
| 2007 | 705 | +0.12% |
| 2012 | 694 | −0.31% |
| 2017 | 642 | −1.55% |
| 2023 | 622 | −0.53% |
Source: INSEE

== See also ==
- Communes of the Loire department
