= Belmont-de-la-Loire =

- Commune
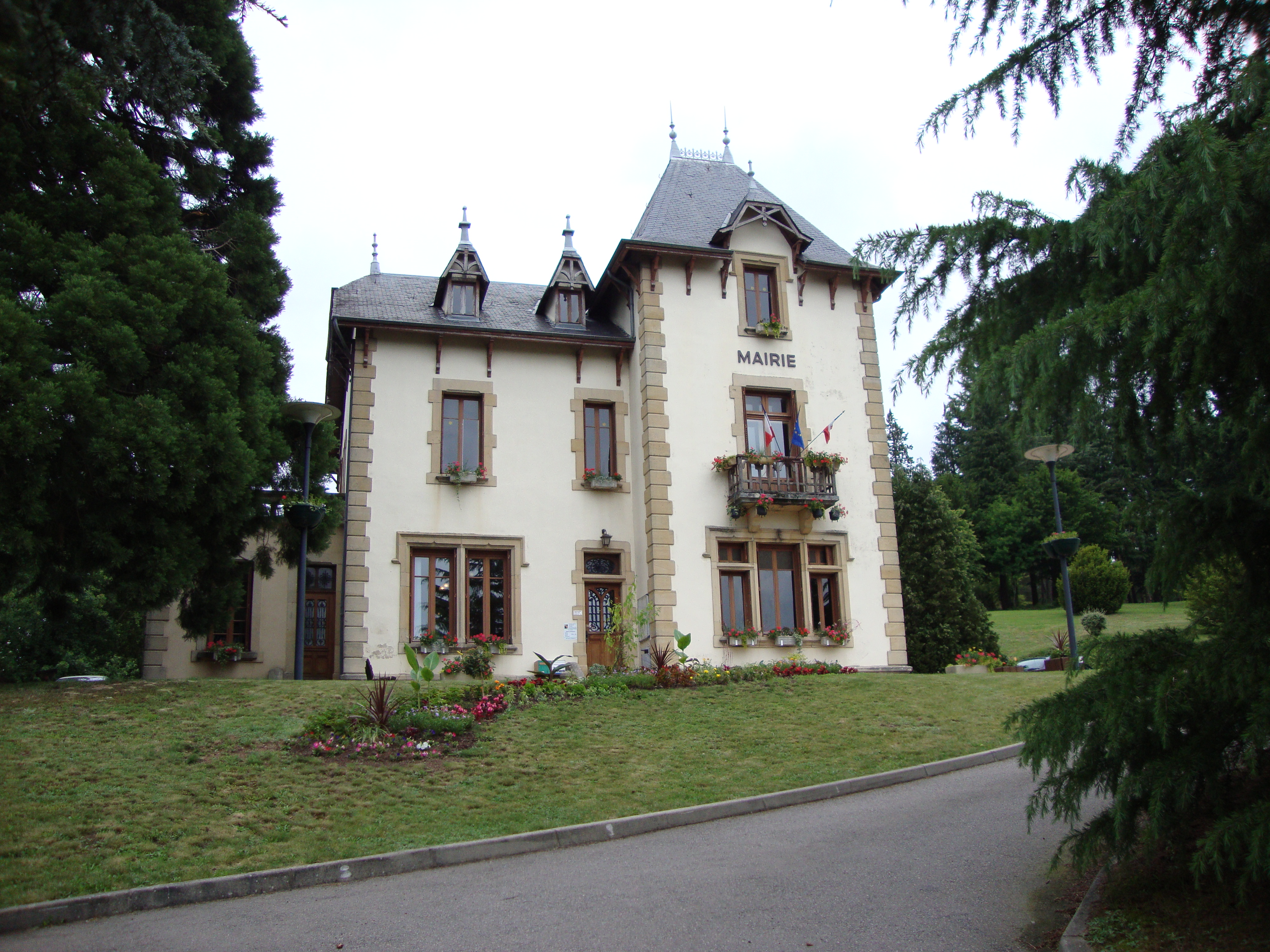
- Town hall

- Coat of arms
- Location of Belmont-de-la-Loire
- Location within France Location within Auvergne-Rhône-Alpes
- Coordinates: 46°09′57″N 4°20′50″E
- Country: France
- Region: Auvergne-Rhône-Alpes
- Department: Loire
- Arrondissement: Roanne
- Canton: Charlieu
- Intercommunality: Charlieu-Belmont

Government
  - Mayor (2020–2026): Jean-Luc Matray
- Area^{1}: 23.71 km^{2} (9.15 sq mi)
- Elevation: 525 m (1,722 ft)
- Highest elevation: 822 m (2,697 ft)
- Lowest elevation: 402 m (1,319 ft)
- Population (2023): 1,410
  - Density: 59.5/km^{2} (154/sq mi)
- Time zone: UTC+01:00 (CET)
  - Summer (DST): UTC+02:00 (CEST)
- INSEE/Postal code: 42015 /42670
- ^{1} French Land Register data, which excludes lakes, ponds, glaciers > 1 km^{2} (0.386 sq mi or 247 acres) and river estuaries.

Belmont-de-la-Loire (French pronunciation: [bɛlmɔ̃ də la lwaʁ]) is a commune in the Loire department in central France.

== Population ==
Historical population
Year	Pop.	±% p.a.
1968	1,659	—
1975	1,653	−0.05%
1982	1,567	−0.76%
1990	1,528	−0.31%
1999	1,501	−0.20%
2007	1,518	+0.14%
2012	1,567	+0.64%
2017	1,491	−0.99%
2023	1,410	−0.93%
Source: INSEE

== See also ==
- Communes of the Loire department
