= Saint-Germain-la-Montagne =

- Commune
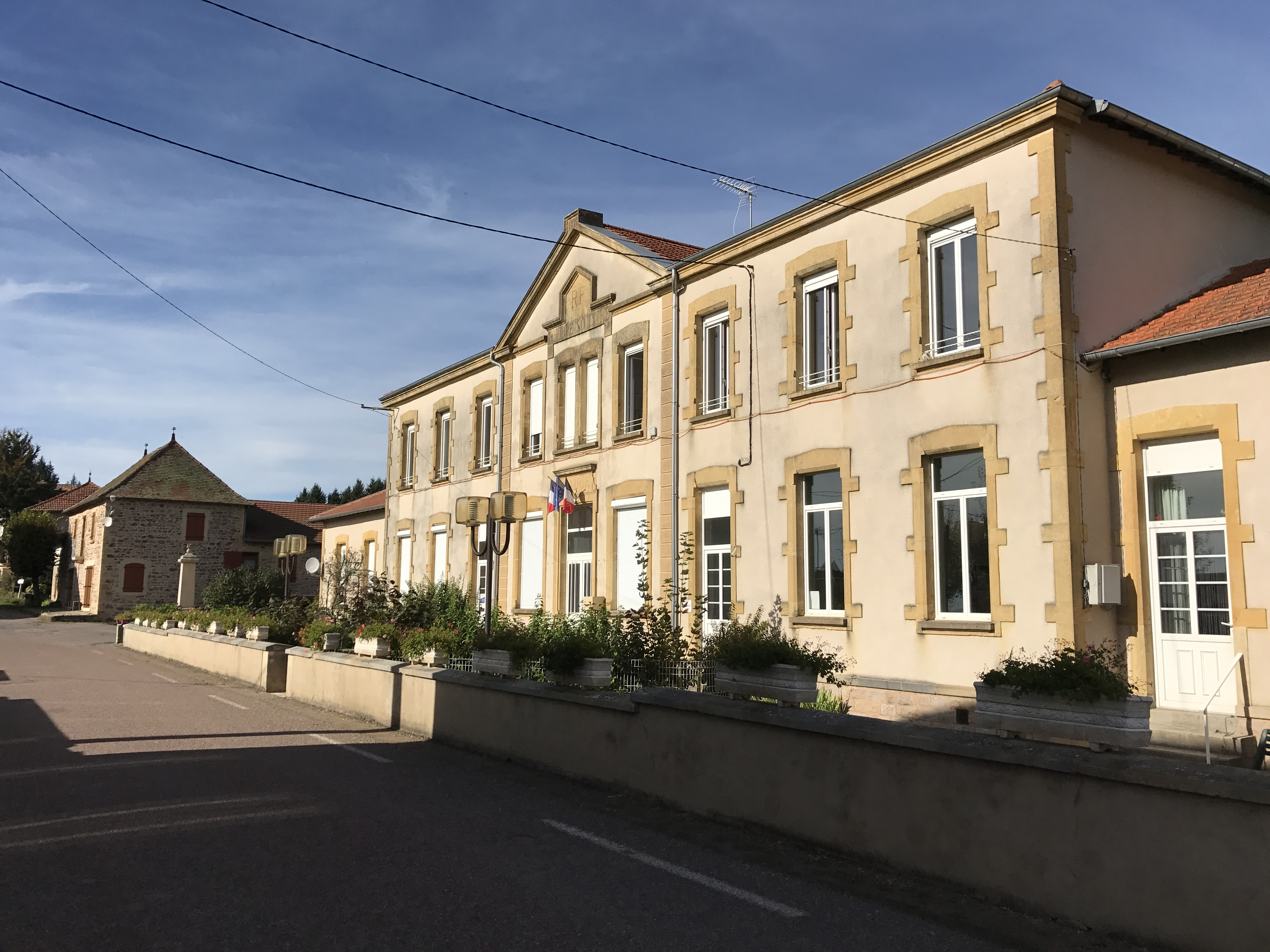
- Town hall
- Location of Saint-Germain-la-Montagne
- Location within France Location within Auvergne-Rhône-Alpes
- Coordinates: 46°12′12″N 4°22′43″E
- Country: France
- Region: Auvergne-Rhône-Alpes
- Department: Loire
- Arrondissement: Roanne
- Canton: Charlieu
- Intercommunality: Charlieu-Belmont Communauté

Government
  - Mayor (2020–2026): Yves Crozet
- Area^{1}: 12.54 km^{2} (4.84 sq mi)
- Elevation: 610 m (2,000 ft)
- Highest elevation: 721 m (2,365 ft)
- Lowest elevation: 434 m (1,424 ft)
- Population (2023): 211
  - Density: 16.8/km^{2} (43.6/sq mi)
- Time zone: UTC+01:00 (CET)
  - Summer (DST): UTC+02:00 (CEST)
- INSEE/Postal code: 42229 /42670
- ^{1} French Land Register data, which excludes lakes, ponds, glaciers > 1 km^{2} (0.386 sq mi or 247 acres) and river estuaries.

Saint-Germain-la-Montagne (French pronunciation: [sɛ̃ ʒɛʁmɛ̃ la mɔ̃taɲ]) is a commune in the Loire department in central France.

== Climate ==
Several studies have been conducted to characterize the climate types to which the national territory is exposed. The resulting zonings differ according to the methods used, the nature and number of parameters taken into account, the territorial grid of the data, and the reference period. In 2010, the municipality's climate was classified as a degraded oceanic climate of the plains of central and northern France, according to a study by the French National Centre for Scientific Research (CNRS) based on a method combining climate data and environmental factors (topography, land use, etc.) and data covering the period 1971-2000.

== Population ==
Historical population
Year	Pop.	±% p.a.
1968	283	—
1975	201	−4.77%
1982	214	+0.90%
1990	212	−0.12%
1999	202	−0.54%
2007	202	+0.00%
2012	237	+3.25%
2017	240	+0.25%
2023	211	−2.12%
Source: INSEE

== See also ==
- Communes of the Loire department
