= Arcinges =

- Commune
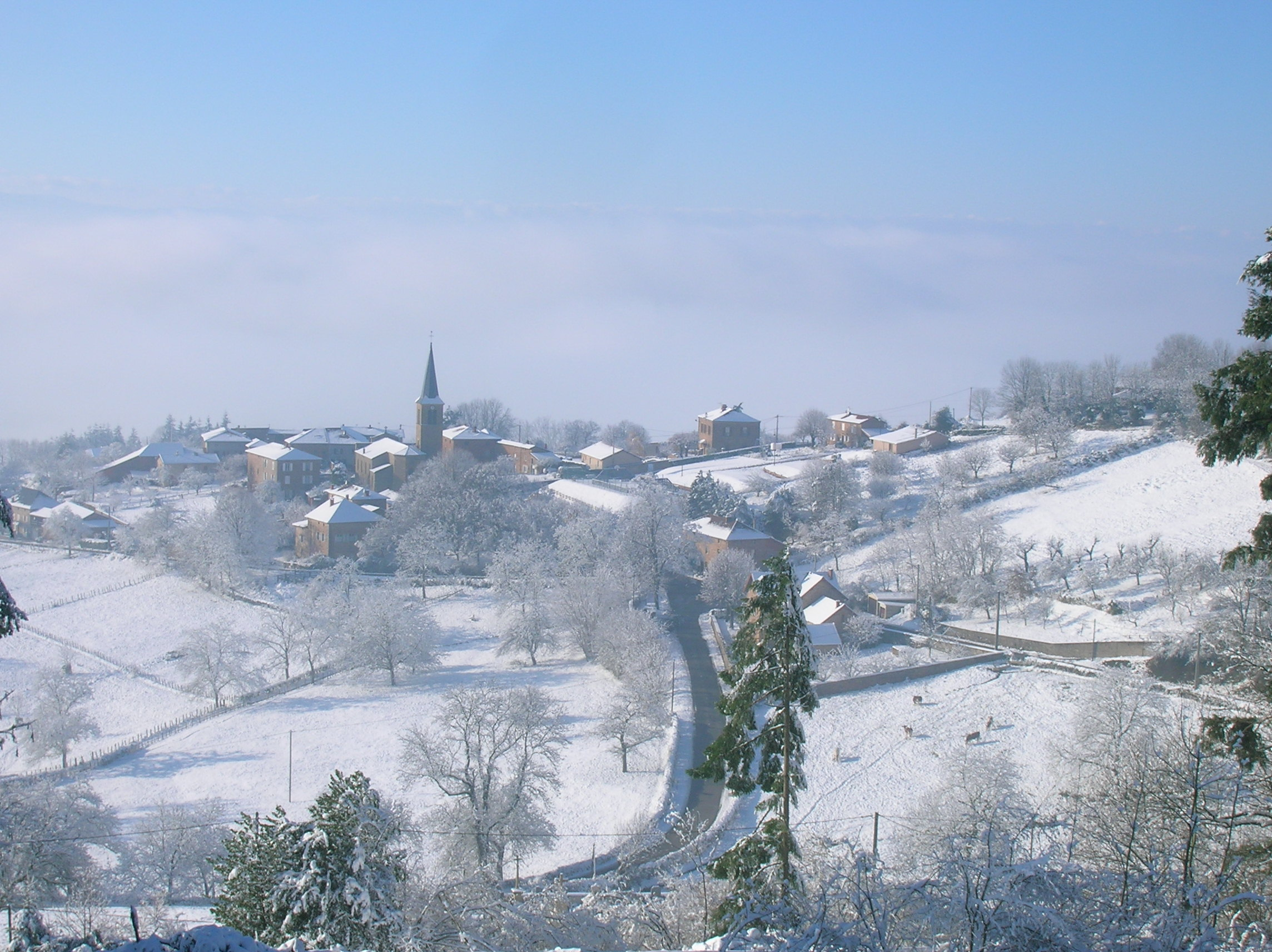
- Location of Arcinges
- Location within France Location within Auvergne-Rhône-Alpes
- Coordinates: 46°08′18″N 4°16′54″E
- Country: France
- Region: Auvergne-Rhône-Alpes
- Department: Loire
- Arrondissement: Roanne
- Canton: Charlieu
- Intercommunality: Charlieu-Belmont

Government
  - Mayor (2020–2026): Henri Grosdenis
- Area^{1}: 3.44 km^{2} (1.33 sq mi)
- Elevation: 480 m (1,570 ft)
- Highest elevation: 720 m (2,360 ft)
- Lowest elevation: 398 m (1,306 ft)
- Population (2023): 216
  - Density: 62.8/km^{2} (163/sq mi)
- Time zone: UTC+01:00 (CET)
  - Summer (DST): UTC+02:00 (CEST)
- INSEE/Postal code: 42007 /42460
- ^{1} French Land Register data, which excludes lakes, ponds, glaciers > 1 km^{2} (0.386 sq mi or 247 acres) and river estuaries.

Arcinges (French pronunciation: [aʁsɛ̃ʒ]) is a commune in the Loire department in central France.

== Population ==
Historical population
Year	Pop.	±% p.a.
1968	155	—
1975	131	−2.37%
1982	135	+0.43%
1990	122	−1.26%
1999	134	+1.05%
2007	181	+3.83%
2012	200	+2.02%
2017	212	+1.17%
2023	216	+0.31%
Source: INSEE

== See also ==
- Communes of the Loire department
