= Écoche =

- Commune
- Coat of arms
- Location of Écoche
- Location within France Location within Auvergne-Rhône-Alpes
- Coordinates: 46°09′42″N 4°17′54″E
- Country: France
- Region: Auvergne-Rhône-Alpes
- Department: Loire
- Arrondissement: Roanne
- Canton: Charlieu

Government
  - Mayor (2020–2026): Jean-Charles Butaud
- Area^{1}: 11.7 km^{2} (4.5 sq mi)
- Elevation: 430 m (1,410 ft)
- Highest elevation: 791 m (2,595 ft)
- Lowest elevation: 373 m (1,224 ft)
- Population (2023): 525
  - Density: 44.9/km^{2} (116/sq mi)
- Time zone: UTC+01:00 (CET)
  - Summer (DST): UTC+02:00 (CEST)
- INSEE/Postal code: 42086 /42670
- ^{1} French Land Register data, which excludes lakes, ponds, glaciers > 1 km^{2} (0.386 sq mi or 247 acres) and river estuaries.

Écoche (French pronunciation: [ekɔʃ]) is a commune in the Loire department in central France.

== Population ==
Historical population
Year	Pop.	±% p.a.
1968	345	—
1975	308	−1.61%
1982	353	+1.97%
1990	371	+0.62%
1999	413	+1.20%
2007	520	+2.92%
2012	557	+1.38%
2017	537	−0.73%
2023	525	−0.38%
Source: INSEE

== See also ==
- Communes of the Loire department
