= La Gresle =

- Commune
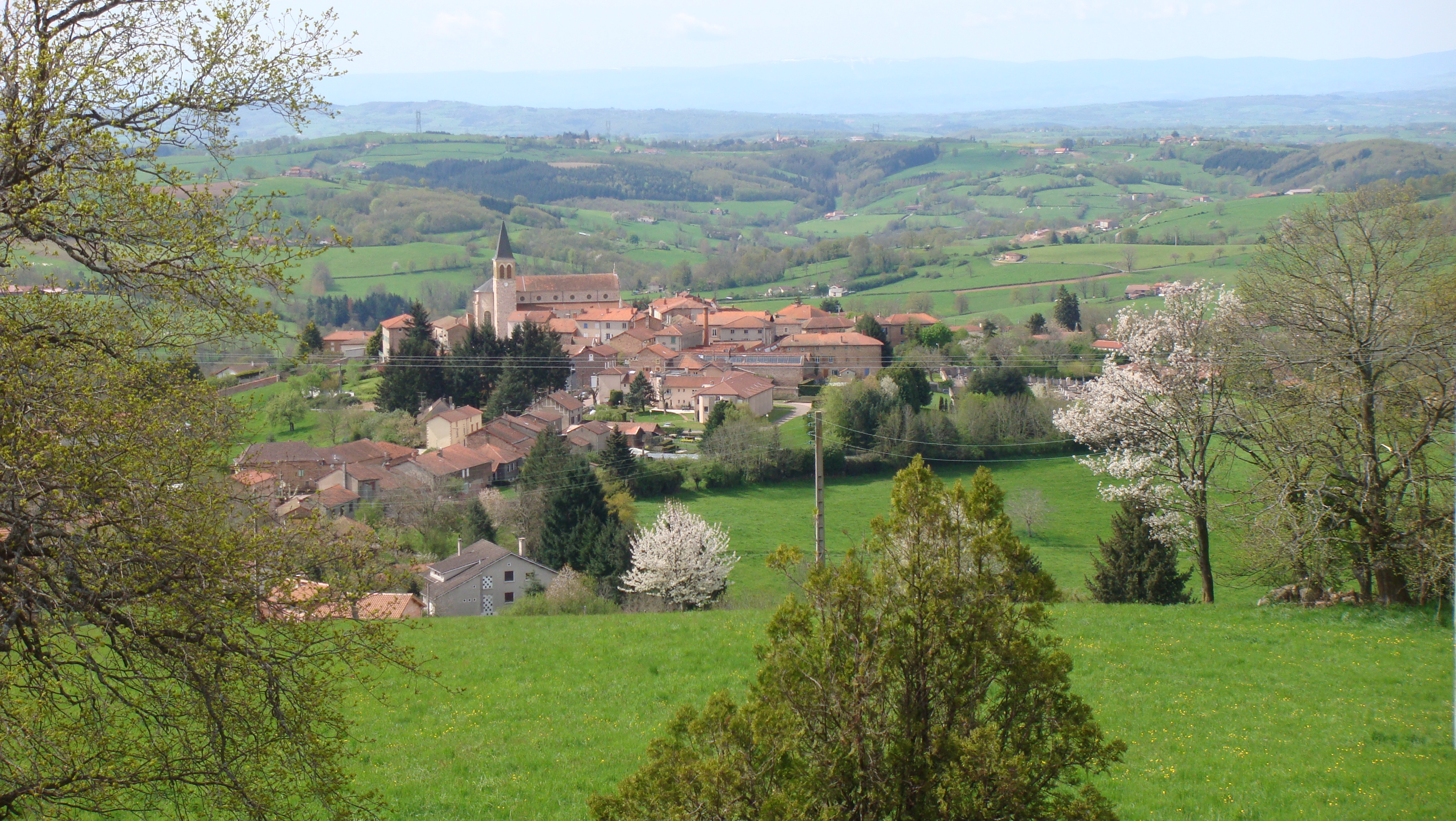

- Coat of arms
- Location of La Gresle
- Location within France Location within Auvergne-Rhône-Alpes
- Coordinates: 46°04′35″N 4°16′59″E
- Country: France
- Region: Auvergne-Rhône-Alpes
- Department: Loire
- Arrondissement: Roanne
- Canton: Charlieu

Government
  - Mayor (2020–2026): Isabelle Dugelet
- Area^{1}: 14.75 km^{2} (5.70 sq mi)
- Elevation: 500 m (1,600 ft)
- Highest elevation: 662 m (2,172 ft)
- Lowest elevation: 371 m (1,217 ft)
- Population (2023): 857
  - Density: 58.1/km^{2} (150/sq mi)
- Time zone: UTC+01:00 (CET)
  - Summer (DST): UTC+02:00 (CEST)
- INSEE/Postal code: 42104 /42460
- ^{1} French Land Register data, which excludes lakes, ponds, glaciers > 1 km^{2} (0.386 sq mi or 247 acres) and river estuaries.

La Gresle (French pronunciation: [la gʁɛl]) is a commune in the Loire department in central France.

== Population ==
Historical population
Year	Pop.	±% p.a.
1968	704	—
1975	652	−1.09%
1982	683	+0.67%
1990	728	+0.80%
1999	745	+0.26%
2007	818	+1.18%
2012	803	−0.37%
2017	842	+0.95%
2023	857	+0.29%
Source: INSEE

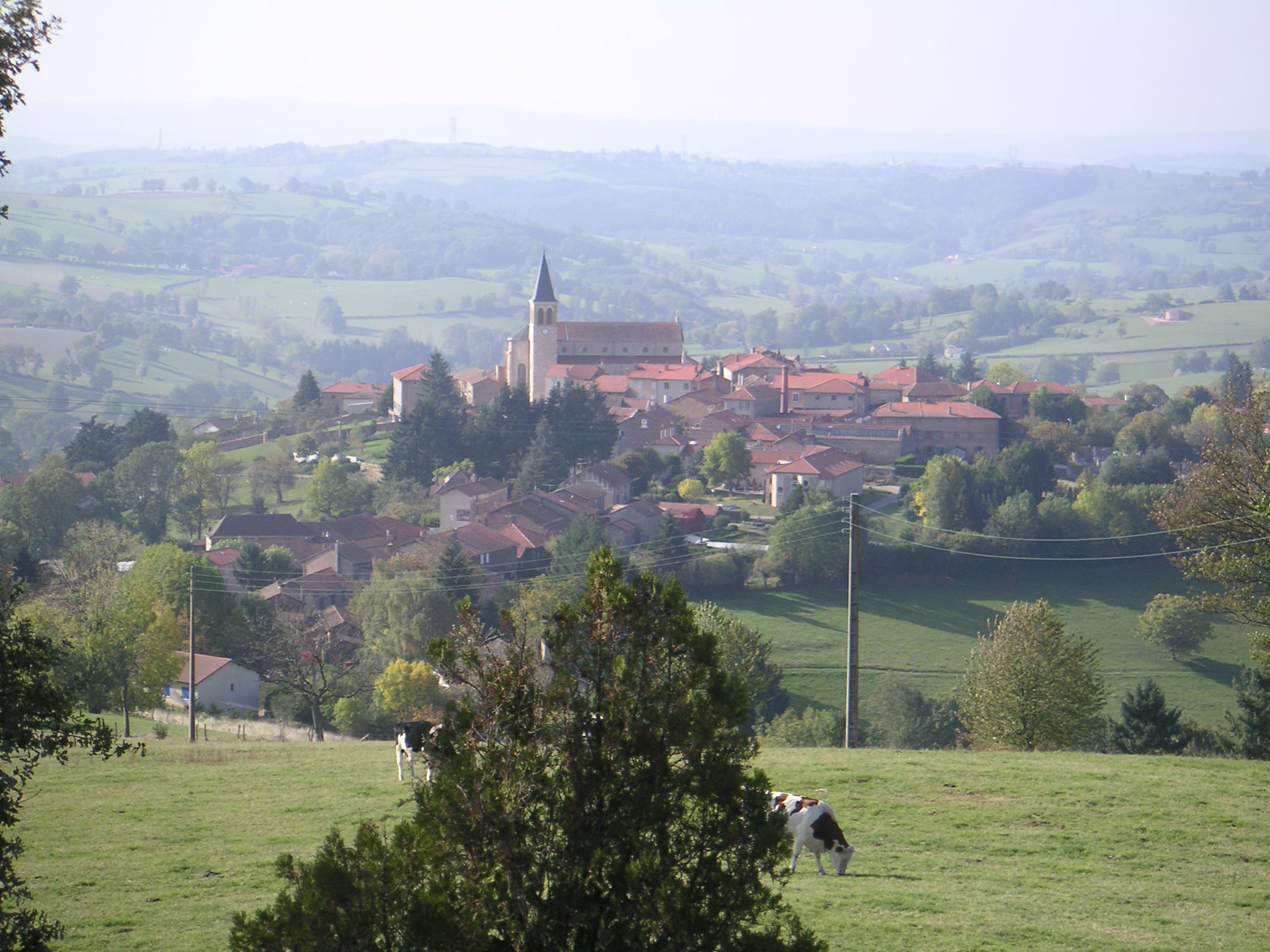
La Gresle Fall

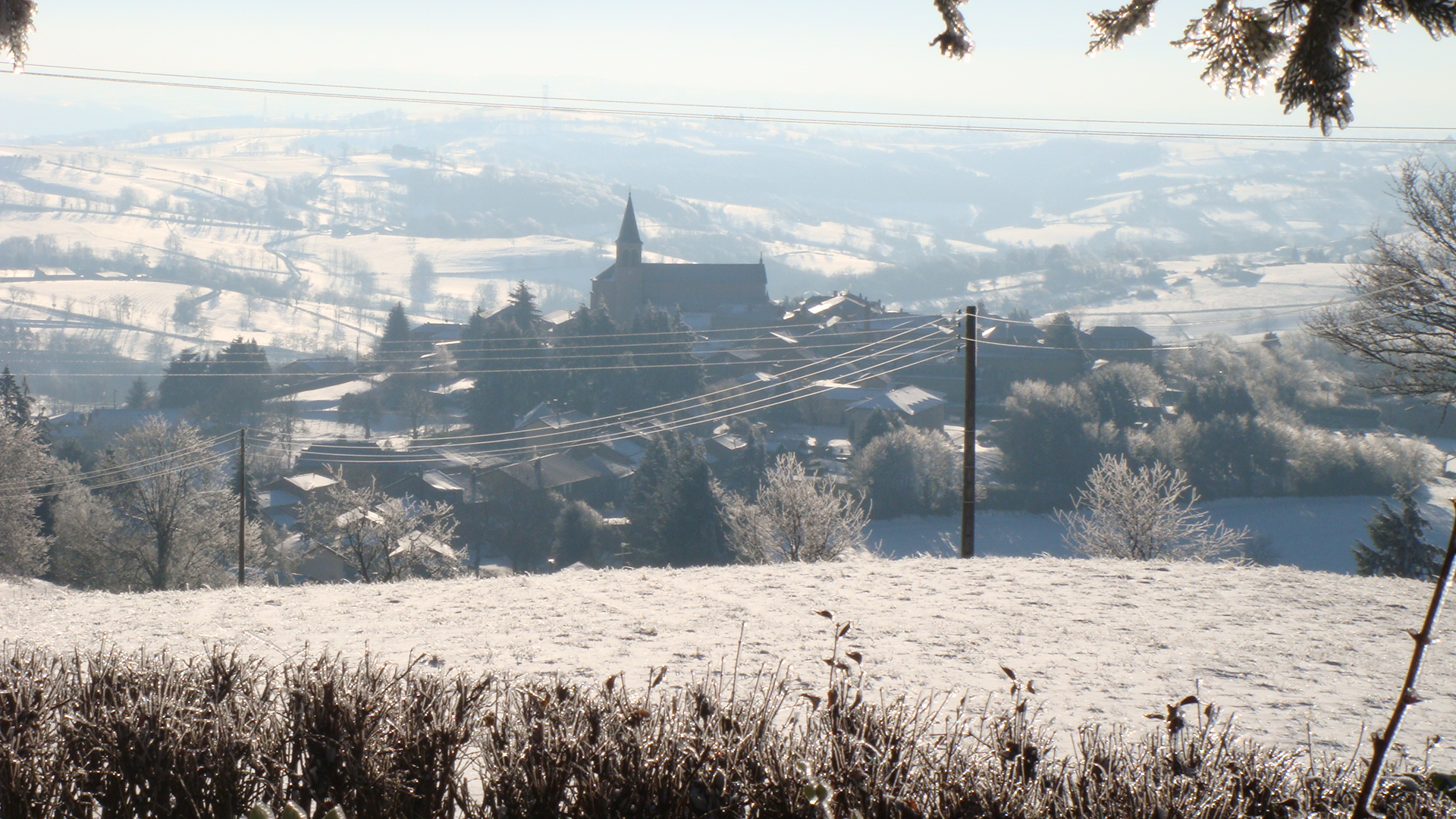
La Gresle Winter

== See also ==
- Communes of the Loire department
