= Canton of Charlieu =

Coordinates: 46.1388°N 4.1827°E

Charlieu
- Canton
- Country: France
- Region: Auvergne-Rhône-Alpes
- Department: Loire
- No. of communes: {{{nbcomm}}}
- Area: 368.19 km^{2} (142.16 sq mi)
- Population (2023): 29,582
  - Density: 80.344/km^{2} (208.09/sq mi)
- INSEE code: 42 03

The canton of Charlieu is a French administrative division located in the department of Loire and the Auvergne-Rhône-Alpes region. At the French canton reorganisation which came into effect in March 2015, the canton was expanded from 14 to 31 communes:

- Arcinges
- Belleroche
- Belmont-de-la-Loire
- La Bénisson-Dieu
- Boyer
- Briennon
- Le Cergne
- Chandon
- Charlieu
- Combre
- Coutouvre
- Cuinzier
- Écoche
- La Gresle
- Jarnosse
- Maizilly
- Mars
- Montagny
- Nandax
- Pouilly-sous-Charlieu
- Pradines
- Régny
- Saint-Denis-de-Cabanne
- Saint-Germain-la-Montagne
- Saint-Hilaire-sous-Charlieu
- Saint-Nizier-sous-Charlieu
- Saint-Pierre-la-Noaille
- Saint-Victor-sur-Rhins
- Sevelinges
- Villers
- Vougy

== See also ==
- Cantons of the Loire department
