= Charlieu =

- Commune
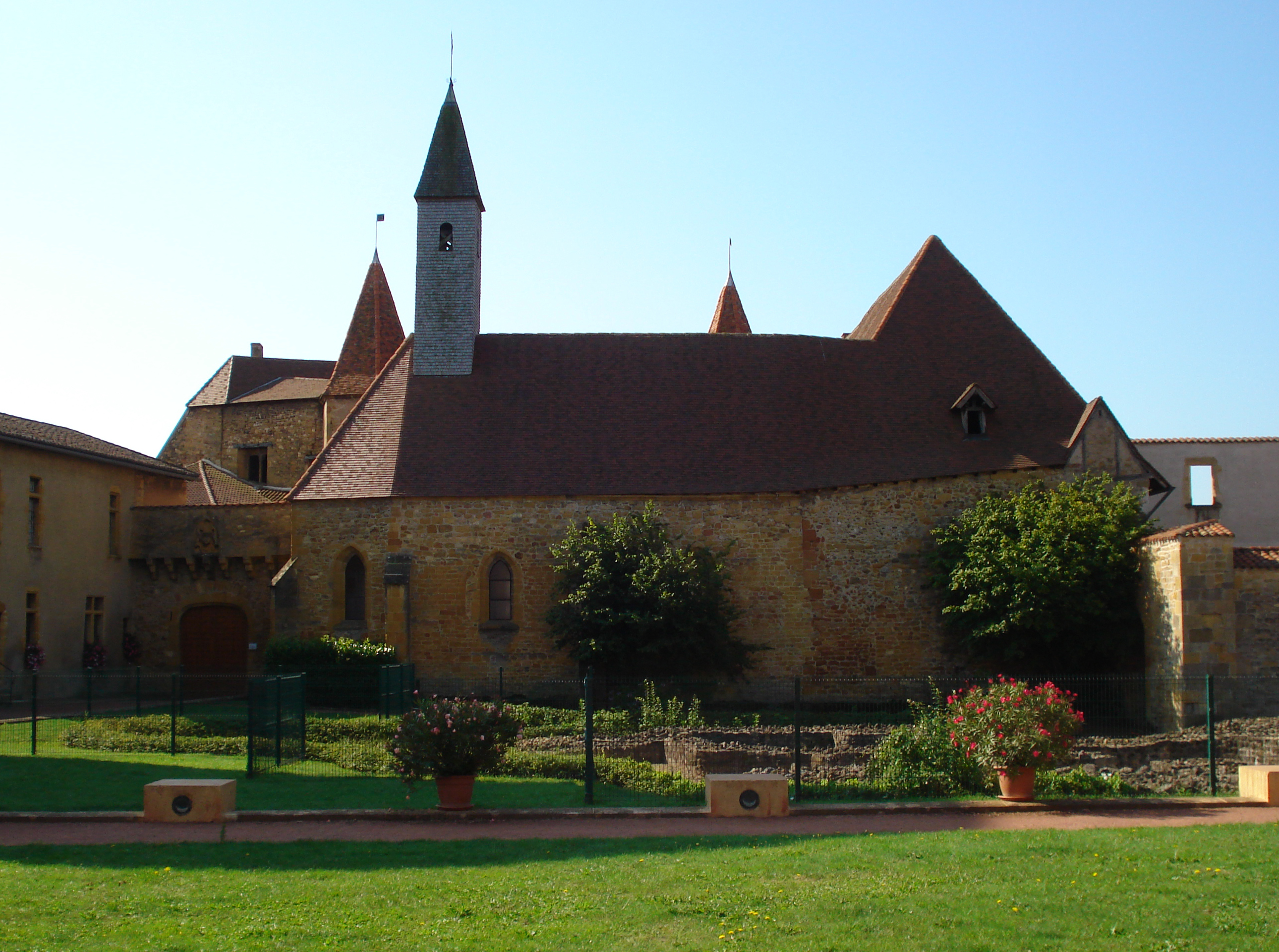
- Abbey

- Coat of arms
- Location of Charlieu
- Location within France Location within Auvergne-Rhône-Alpes
- Coordinates: 46°09′36″N 4°10′21″E
- Country: France
- Region: Auvergne-Rhône-Alpes
- Department: Loire
- Arrondissement: Roanne
- Canton: Charlieu

Government
  - Mayor (2020–2026): Bruno Berthelier
- Area^{1}: 6.7 km^{2} (2.6 sq mi)
- Elevation: 265 m (869 ft)
- Highest elevation: 378 m (1,240 ft)
- Lowest elevation: 268 m (879 ft)
- Population (2023): 3,766
  - Density: 560/km^{2} (1,500/sq mi)
- Time zone: UTC+01:00 (CET)
  - Summer (DST): UTC+02:00 (CEST)
- INSEE/Postal code: 42052 /42190
- ^{1} French Land Register data, which excludes lakes, ponds, glaciers > 1 km^{2} (0.386 sq mi or 247 acres) and river estuaries.

Charlieu (French pronunciation: [ʃaʁljø]; Arpitan: Charluè) is a commune in the Loire department at the northern end of the Auvergne-Rhône-Alpes region of France. It is home to Charlieu Abbey.

== Population ==
Historical population

| Year | Pop. | ±% p.a. |
|---|---|---|
| 1793 | 2,600 | — |
| 1821 | 2,404 | −0.28% |
| 1846 | 3,990 | +2.05% |
| 1872 | 3,879 | −0.11% |
| 1901 | 5,406 | +1.15% |
| 1926 | 5,117 | −0.22% |
| 1946 | 4,976 | −0.14% |
| 1962 | 4,911 | −0.08% |
| 1968 | 4,923 | +0.04% |

| Year | Pop. | ±% p.a. |
|---|---|---|
| 1975 | 4,789 | −0.39% |
| 1982 | 4,322 | −1.46% |
| 1990 | 3,727 | −1.83% |
| 1999 | 3,582 | −0.44% |
| 2007 | 3,624 | +0.15% |
| 2012 | 3,705 | +0.44% |
| 2017 | 3,667 | −0.21% |
| 2023 | 3,766 | +0.44% |

Source: EHESS and INSEE (1968-2023)

== Twin towns ==
It is twinned with the town of Calne in Wiltshire, UK.

== See also ==
- Communes of the Loire department
