= Chalain =

Chalain may refer to:

== Places ==
In France

- Chalain-d'Uzore, in the Loire département
- Chalain-le-Comtal, in the Loire département
- Lac de Chalain, lake in the Jura département
