= L'Hôpital-le-Grand =

- Commune
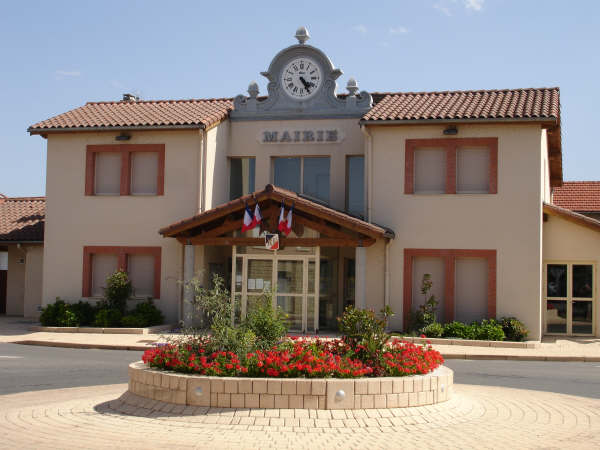
- Town hall

- Coat of arms
- Location of L'Hôpital-le-Grand
- Location within France Location within Auvergne-Rhône-Alpes
- Coordinates: 45°35′39″N 4°11′55″E
- Country: France
- Region: Auvergne-Rhône-Alpes
- Department: Loire
- Arrondissement: Montbrison
- Canton: Montbrison
- Intercommunality: CA Loire Forez

Government
  - Mayor (2020–2026): Christophe Destras
- Area^{1}: 12.86 km^{2} (4.97 sq mi)
- Elevation: 375 m (1,230 ft)
- Highest elevation: 380 m (1,250 ft)
- Lowest elevation: 352 m (1,155 ft)
- Population (2023): 1,053
  - Density: 81.88/km^{2} (212.1/sq mi)
- Time zone: UTC+01:00 (CET)
  - Summer (DST): UTC+02:00 (CEST)
- INSEE/Postal code: 42108 /42210
- ^{1} French Land Register data, which excludes lakes, ponds, glaciers > 1 km^{2} (0.386 sq mi or 247 acres) and river estuaries.

L'Hôpital-le-Grand (French pronunciation: [lopital lə ɡʁɑ̃]) is a commune in the Loire department in central France.

== Geography ==
L'Hôpital-le-Grand is situated near Boisset-lès-Montrond, Craintilleux, Sury-le-Comtal, and Montbrison.

== Population ==
Historical population
Year	Pop.	±% p.a.
1968	341	—
1975	361	+0.82%
1982	407	+1.73%
1990	506	+2.76%
1999	596	+1.84%
2007	900	+5.29%
2012	983	+1.78%
2017	1,054	+1.40%
2023	1,053	−0.02%
Source: INSEE

== See also ==
- Communes of the Loire department
