= Savigneux =

Savigneux may refer to the following places in France:

- Savigneux, Ain, a commune in the department of Ain
- Savigneux, Loire, a commune in the department of Loire
