= Lézigneux =

- Commune
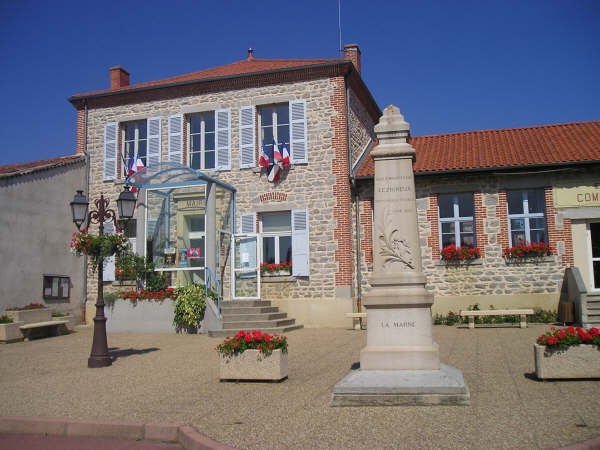
- School and town hall

- Coat of arms
- Location of Lézigneux
- Location within France Location within Auvergne-Rhône-Alpes
- Coordinates: 45°34′05″N 4°03′40″E
- Country: France
- Region: Auvergne-Rhône-Alpes
- Department: Loire
- Arrondissement: Montbrison
- Canton: Montbrison
- Intercommunality: CA Loire Forez

Government
  - Mayor (2020–2026): Patrick Romestaing
- Area^{1}: 15.04 km^{2} (5.81 sq mi)
- Elevation: 550 m (1,800 ft)
- Highest elevation: 844 m (2,769 ft)
- Lowest elevation: 419 m (1,375 ft)
- Population (2023): 1,739
  - Density: 115.6/km^{2} (299.5/sq mi)
- Time zone: UTC+01:00 (CET)
  - Summer (DST): UTC+02:00 (CEST)
- INSEE/Postal code: 42122 /42600
- ^{1} French Land Register data, which excludes lakes, ponds, glaciers > 1 km^{2} (0.386 sq mi or 247 acres) and river estuaries.

Lézigneux (French pronunciation: [leziɲø]) is a commune in the Loire department in central France.

== Population ==
Historical population
Year	Pop.	±% p.a.
1968	539	—
1975	597	+1.47%
1982	766	+3.63%
1990	900	+2.04%
1999	1,153	+2.79%
2007	1,597	+4.16%
2012	1,676	+0.97%
2017	1,695	+0.23%
2023	1,739	+0.43%
Source: INSEE

== See also ==
- Communes of the Loire department
