= Saint-Thomas-la-Garde =

- Commune
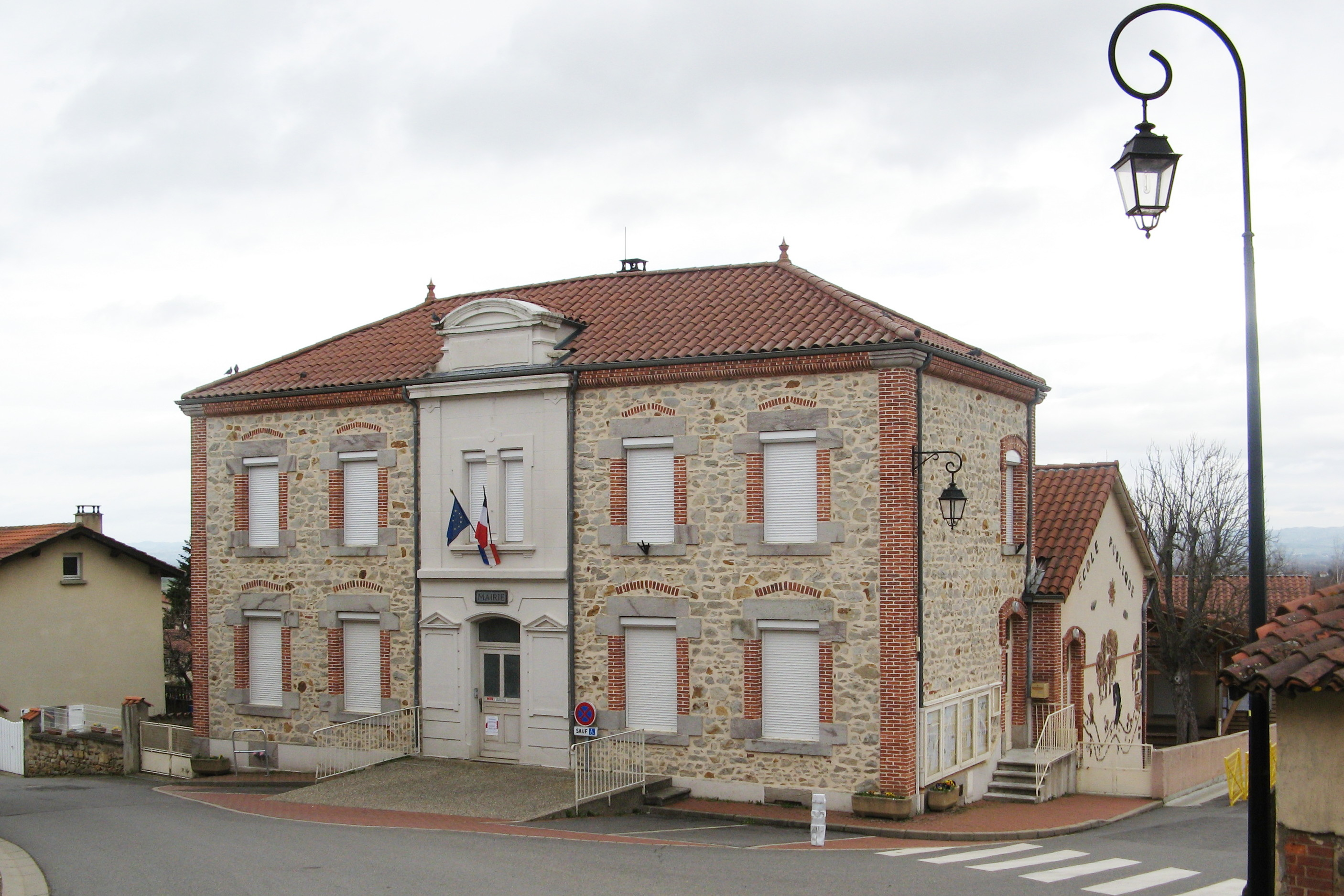
- Town hall

- Coat of arms
- Location of Saint-Thomas-la-Garde
- Location within France Location within Auvergne-Rhône-Alpes
- Coordinates: 45°34′03″N 4°04′53″E
- Country: France
- Region: Auvergne-Rhône-Alpes
- Department: Loire
- Arrondissement: Montbrison
- Canton: Montbrison
- Intercommunality: CA Loire Forez

Government
  - Mayor (2020–2026): Frédéric Pugnet
- Area^{1}: 3.41 km^{2} (1.32 sq mi)
- Elevation: 450 m (1,480 ft)
- Highest elevation: 546 m (1,791 ft)
- Lowest elevation: 400 m (1,300 ft)
- Population (2023): 592
  - Density: 174/km^{2} (450/sq mi)
- Time zone: UTC+01:00 (CET)
  - Summer (DST): UTC+02:00 (CEST)
- INSEE/Postal code: 42290 /42600
- ^{1} French Land Register data, which excludes lakes, ponds, glaciers > 1 km^{2} (0.386 sq mi or 247 acres) and river estuaries.

Saint-Thomas-la-Garde (French pronunciation: [sɛ̃ tɔmɑ la ɡaʁd]) is a commune in the Loire department in central France.

== Population ==
Historical population
| Year | Pop. | ±% p.a. |
|---|---|---|
| 1968 | 221 | — |
| 1975 | 226 | +0.32% |
| 1982 | 451 | +10.37% |
| 1990 | 506 | +1.45% |
| 1999 | 517 | +0.24% |
| 2007 | 575 | +1.34% |
| 2012 | 582 | +0.24% |
| 2017 | 595 | +0.44% |
| 2023 | 592 | −0.08% |
Source: INSEE

== See also ==
- Communes of the Loire department
