= Précieux =

Précieux Prèssiœ (Arpitan)
- Commune
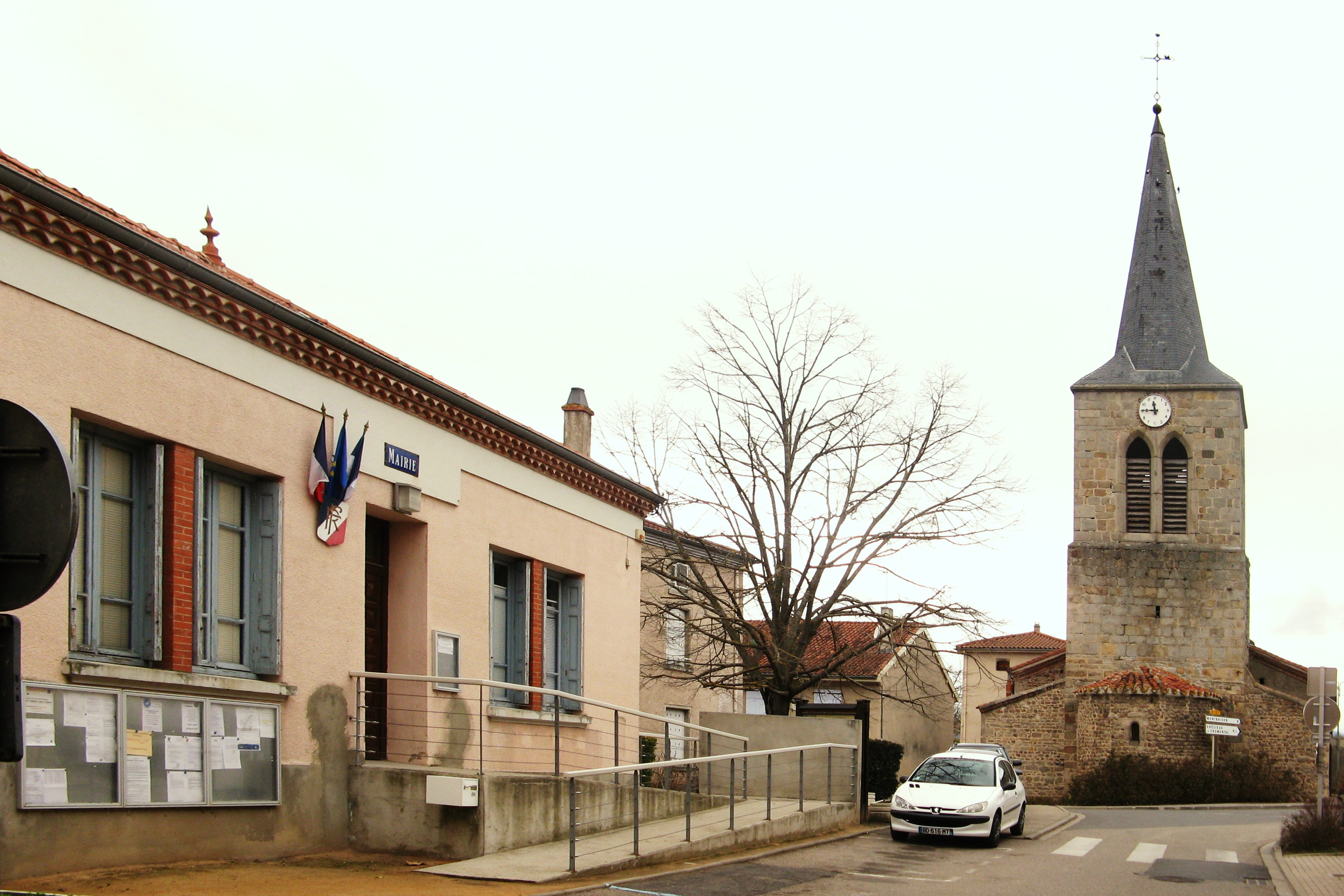
- Town hall and church

- Coat of arms
- Location of Précieux
- Location within France Location within Auvergne-Rhône-Alpes
- Coordinates: 45°35′14″N 4°09′07″E
- Country: France
- Region: Auvergne-Rhône-Alpes
- Department: Loire
- Arrondissement: Montbrison
- Canton: Montbrison
- Intercommunality: CA Loire Forez

Government
  - Mayor (2020–2026): Monique Rey
- Area^{1}: 16.29 km^{2} (6.29 sq mi)
- Elevation: 375 m (1,230 ft)
- Highest elevation: 404 m (1,325 ft)
- Lowest elevation: 358 m (1,175 ft)
- Population (2023): 1,042
  - Density: 63.97/km^{2} (165.7/sq mi)
- Time zone: UTC+01:00 (CET)
  - Summer (DST): UTC+02:00 (CEST)
- INSEE/Postal code: 42180 /42600
- ^{1} French Land Register data, which excludes lakes, ponds, glaciers > 1 km^{2} (0.386 sq mi or 247 acres) and river estuaries.

Précieux (French pronunciation: [pʁesjø]; Arpitan: Prèssiœ [pre.ˈsjø]) is a commune in the Loire department in central France.

== Population ==
Historical population
Year	Pop.	±% p.a.
1968	517	—
1975	510	−0.19%
1982	576	+1.75%
1990	764	+3.59%
1999	775	+0.16%
2007	986	+3.06%
2012	1,059	+1.44%
2017	1,031	−0.53%
2023	1,042	+0.18%
Source: INSEE

== Personalities ==
Benoît Malon (1841 - 1893), politician, journalist was born in Précieux.

== See also ==
- Communes of the Loire department
