= Magneux-Haute-Rive =

- Commune
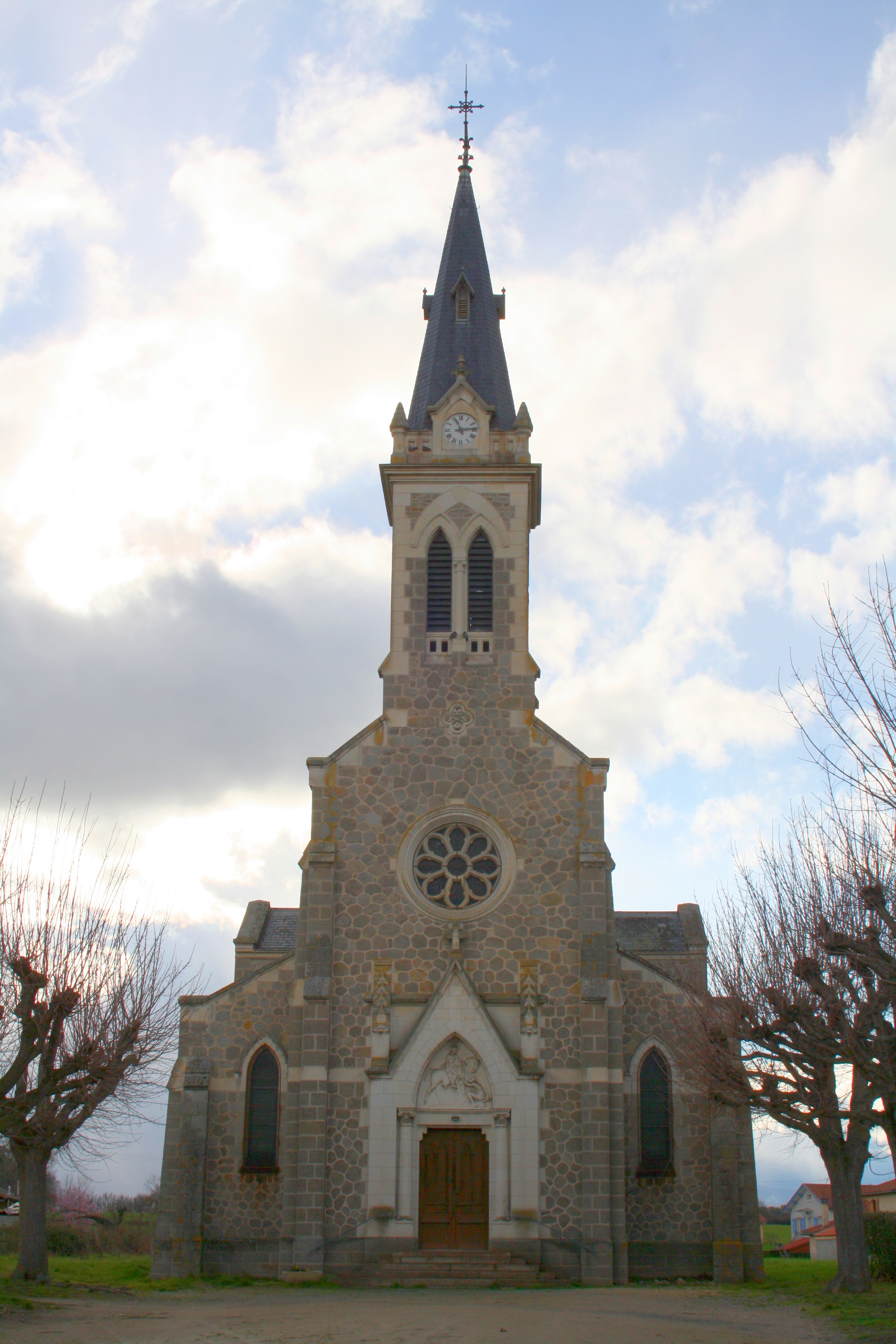

- Coat of arms
- Location of Magneux-Haute-Rive
- Location within France Location within Auvergne-Rhône-Alpes
- Coordinates: 45°40′17″N 4°10′19″E
- Country: France
- Region: Auvergne-Rhône-Alpes
- Department: Loire
- Arrondissement: Montbrison
- Canton: Montbrison
- Intercommunality: CA Loire Forez

Government
  - Mayor (2020–2026): Roland Bonnefoi
- Area^{1}: 12.56 km^{2} (4.85 sq mi)
- Elevation: 348 m (1,142 ft)
- Highest elevation: 389 m (1,276 ft)
- Lowest elevation: 334 m (1,096 ft)
- Population (2023): 555
  - Density: 44.2/km^{2} (114/sq mi)
- Time zone: UTC+01:00 (CET)
  - Summer (DST): UTC+02:00 (CEST)
- INSEE/Postal code: 42130 /42600
- ^{1} French Land Register data, which excludes lakes, ponds, glaciers > 1 km^{2} (0.386 sq mi or 247 acres) and river estuaries.

Magneux-Haute-Rive (French pronunciation: [maɲø ot ʁiv]) is a commune in the Loire department in central France.

== Population ==
Historical population
Year	Pop.	±% p.a.
1968	228	—
1975	218	−0.64%
1982	185	−2.32%
1990	259	+4.30%
1999	304	+1.80%
2007	370	+2.49%
2012	521	+7.08%
2017	578	+2.10%
2023	555	−0.67%
Source: INSEE

== See also ==
- Communes of the Loire department
