= Chazelles-sur-Lavieu =

Chazelles-sur-Lavieu Chasèles-sus-Lavi (Arpitan)
- Commune
- Coat of arms
- Location of Chazelles-sur-Lavieu
- Location within France Location within Auvergne-Rhône-Alpes
- Coordinates: 45°32′23″N 4°00′05″E
- Country: France
- Region: Auvergne-Rhône-Alpes
- Department: Loire
- Arrondissement: Montbrison
- Canton: Montbrison
- Intercommunality: CA Loire Forez

Government
  - Mayor (2020–2026): Christiane Brun-Jarry
- Area^{1}: 9.85 km^{2} (3.80 sq mi)
- Elevation: 911 m (2,989 ft)
- Highest elevation: 1,200 m (3,900 ft)
- Lowest elevation: 586 m (1,923 ft)
- Population (2023): 261
  - Density: 26.5/km^{2} (68.6/sq mi)
- Time zone: UTC+01:00 (CET)
  - Summer (DST): UTC+02:00 (CEST)
- INSEE/Postal code: 42058 /42560
- ^{1} French Land Register data, which excludes lakes, ponds, glaciers > 1 km^{2} (0.386 sq mi or 247 acres) and river estuaries.

Chazelles-sur-Lavieu (French pronunciation: [ʃazɛl syʁ lavjø], Chazelles on Lavieu; Arpitan: Chasèles-sus-Lavi [tsɒ.ˈzɛl ʃy lɒ.ˈvi]) is a commune in the Loire department in central France.

== Population ==
Historical population
Year	Pop.	±% p.a.
1968	259	—
1975	221	−2.24%
1982	174	−3.36%
1990	156	−1.36%
1999	177	+1.41%
2007	235	+3.61%
2012	268	+2.66%
2017	272	+0.30%
2023	261	−0.69%
Source: INSEE

== See also ==
- Communes of the Loire department
