= Lérigneux =

- Commune
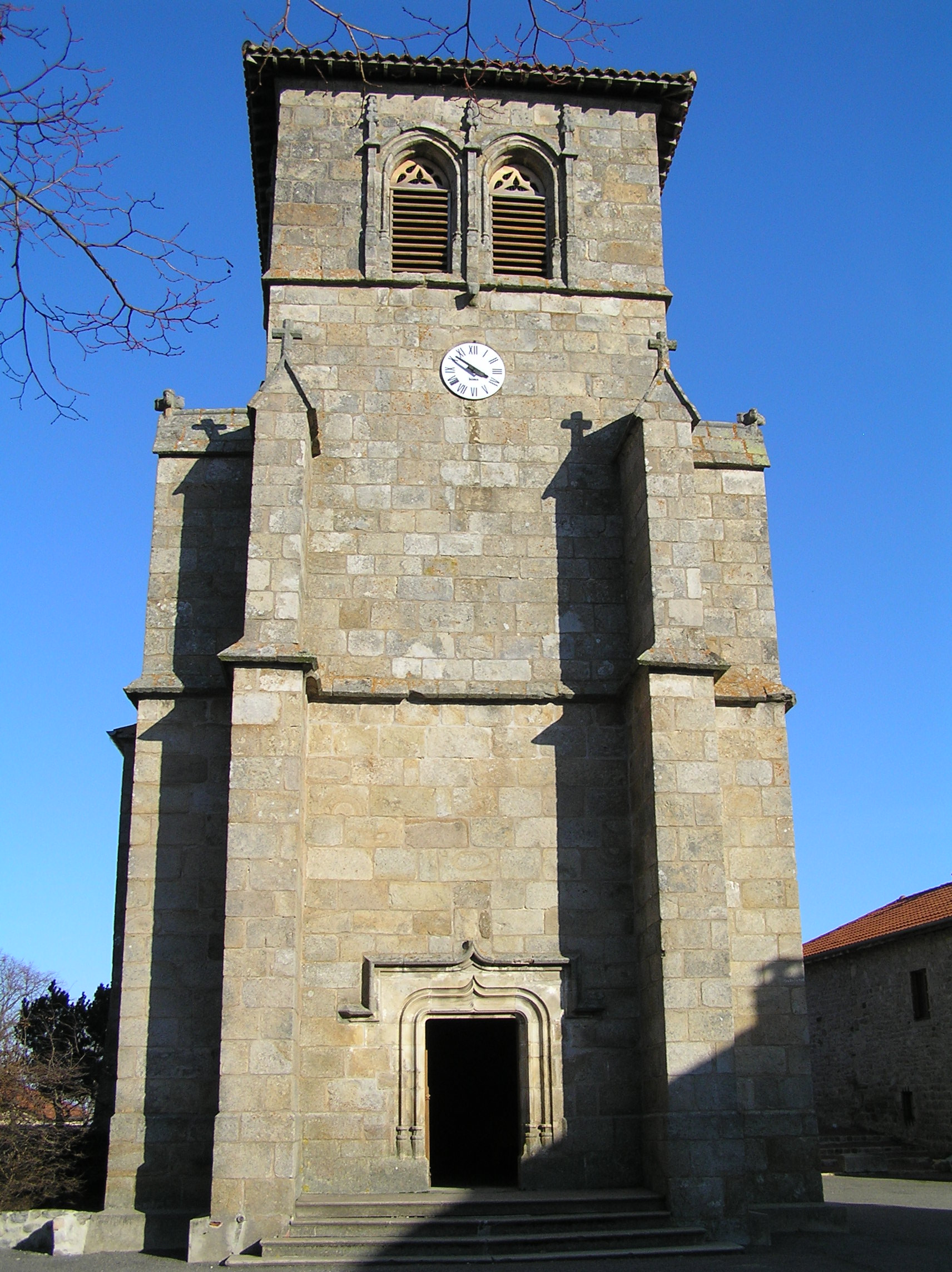
- Location of Lérigneux
- Location within France Location within Auvergne-Rhône-Alpes
- Coordinates: 45°36′06″N 3°57′56″E
- Country: France
- Region: Auvergne-Rhône-Alpes
- Department: Loire
- Arrondissement: Montbrison
- Canton: Montbrison
- Intercommunality: CA Loire Forez

Government
  - Mayor (2020–2026): Thierry Missonnier
- Area^{1}: 9.76 km^{2} (3.77 sq mi)
- Elevation: 933 m (3,061 ft)
- Highest elevation: 1,344 m (4,409 ft)
- Lowest elevation: 827 m (2,713 ft)
- Population (2023): 173
  - Density: 17.7/km^{2} (45.9/sq mi)
- Time zone: UTC+01:00 (CET)
  - Summer (DST): UTC+02:00 (CEST)
- INSEE/Postal code: 42121 /42600
- ^{1} French Land Register data, which excludes lakes, ponds, glaciers > 1 km^{2} (0.386 sq mi or 247 acres) and river estuaries.

Lérigneux (French pronunciation: [leʁiɲø]) is a commune in the Loire department in central France.

== Population ==
Historical population
Year	Pop.	±% p.a.
1968	187	—
1975	161	−2.12%
1982	145	−1.48%
1990	118	−2.54%
1999	126	+0.73%
2007	146	+1.86%
2012	155	+1.20%
2017	143	−1.60%
2023	173	+3.23%
Source: INSEE

== See also ==
- Communes of the Loire department
