= Bard, Loire =

Bard
- Commune
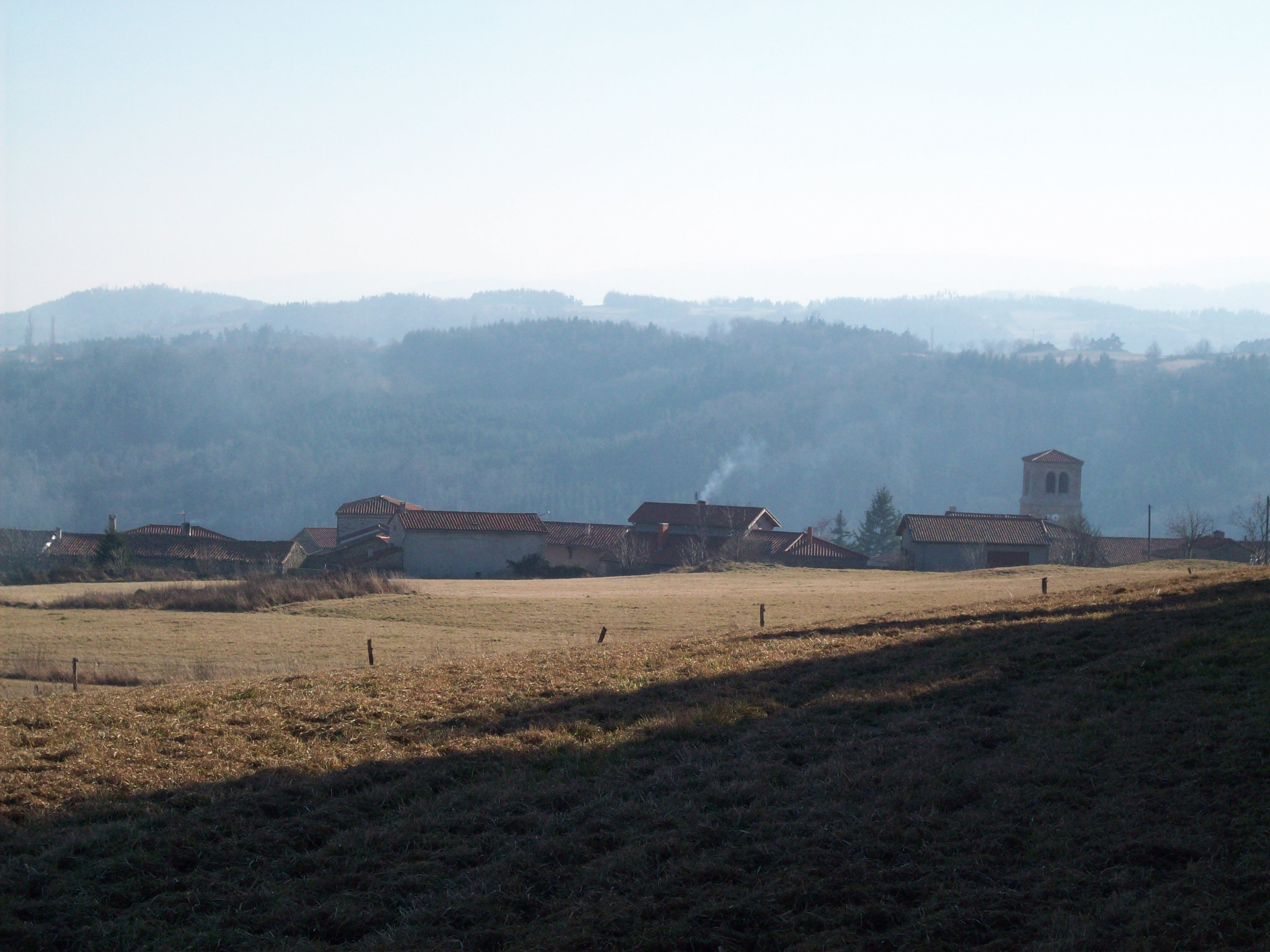

- Coat of arms
- Location of Bard
- Location within France Location within Auvergne-Rhône-Alpes
- Coordinates: 45°35′18″N 4°00′44″E
- Country: France
- Region: Auvergne-Rhône-Alpes
- Department: Loire
- Arrondissement: Montbrison
- Canton: Montbrison
- Intercommunality: CA Loire Forez

Government
  - Mayor (2020–2026): Quentin Pâquet
- Area^{1}: 13.78 km^{2} (5.32 sq mi)
- Elevation: 750 m (2,460 ft)
- Highest elevation: 1,271 m (4,170 ft)
- Lowest elevation: 417 m (1,368 ft)
- Population (2023): 700
  - Density: 51/km^{2} (130/sq mi)
- Time zone: UTC+01:00 (CET)
  - Summer (DST): UTC+02:00 (CEST)
- INSEE/Postal code: 42012 /42600
- ^{1} French Land Register data, which excludes lakes, ponds, glaciers > 1 km^{2} (0.386 sq mi or 247 acres) and river estuaries.

Bard (French pronunciation: [baʁ]) is a commune in the Loire department in central France.

== Population ==
Historical population
Year	Pop.	±% p.a.
1968	335	—
1975	343	+0.34%
1982	418	+2.87%
1990	518	+2.72%
1999	578	+1.23%
2007	631	+1.10%
2012	629	−0.06%
2017	664	+1.09%
2023	700	+0.88%
Source: INSEE

== See also ==
- Communes of the Loire department
