= Roche-en-Forez =

- Commune
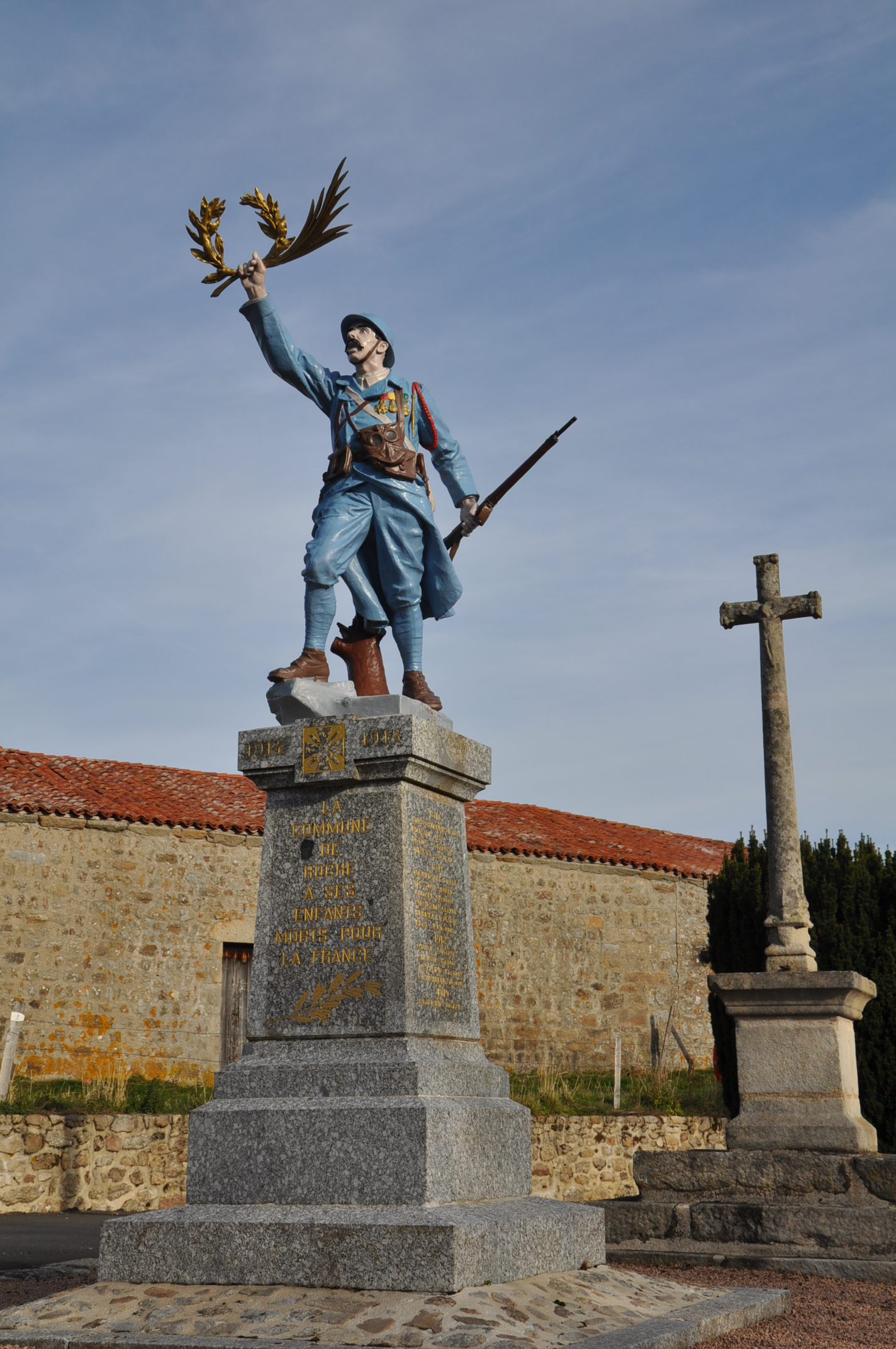
- World War I monument

- Coat of arms
- Location of Roche-en-Forez
- Location within France Location within Auvergne-Rhône-Alpes
- Coordinates: 45°36′55″N 3°56′46″E
- Country: France
- Region: Auvergne-Rhône-Alpes
- Department: Loire
- Arrondissement: Montbrison
- Canton: Montbrison
- Intercommunality: CA Loire Forez

Government
  - Mayor (2020–2026): Christelle Masson
- Area^{1}: 23.33 km^{2} (9.01 sq mi)
- Elevation: 945 m (3,100 ft)
- Highest elevation: 1,418 m (4,652 ft)
- Lowest elevation: 756 m (2,480 ft)
- Population (2023): 251
  - Density: 10.8/km^{2} (27.9/sq mi)
- Time zone: UTC+01:00 (CET)
  - Summer (DST): UTC+02:00 (CEST)
- INSEE/Postal code: 42188 /42600
- ^{1} French Land Register data, which excludes lakes, ponds, glaciers > 1 km^{2} (0.386 sq mi or 247 acres) and river estuaries.

Roche-en-Forez (French pronunciation: [ʁɔʃ], before 2025: Roche) is a commune in the Loire department in central France.

== Population ==
Historical population
Year	Pop.	±% p.a.
1968	376	—
1975	320	−2.28%
1982	316	−0.18%
1990	287	−1.20%
1999	253	−1.39%
2007	270	+0.82%
2012	271	+0.07%
2017	254	−1.29%
2023	251	−0.20%
Source: INSEE

== See also ==
- Communes of the Loire department
