= Loire Forez Agglomération =

Coordinates: 45.6085°N 4.0618°E

- Communauté d'agglomération
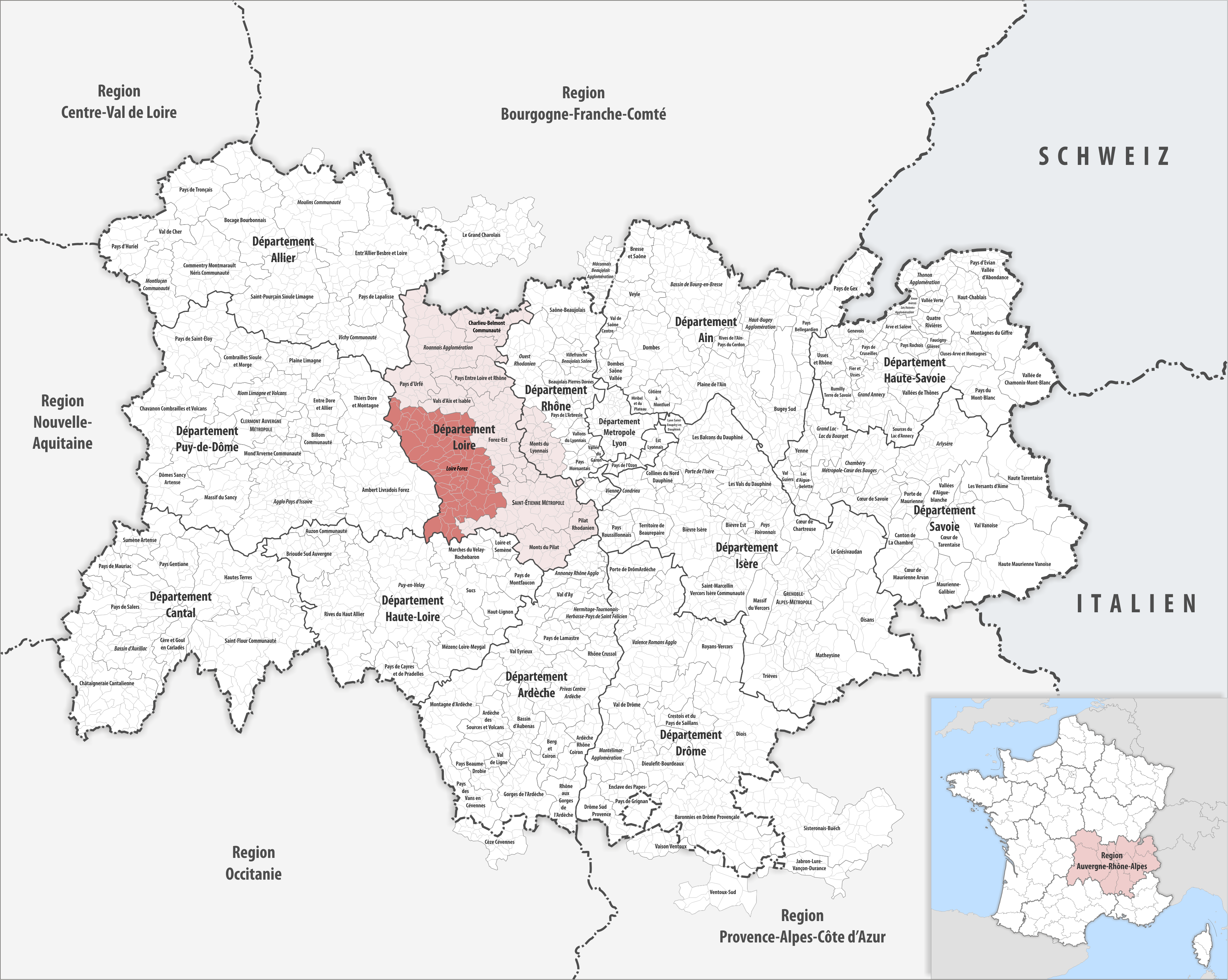
- Country: France
- Region: Auvergne-Rhône-Alpes
- Department: Loire
- No. of communes: {{{nbcomm}}}
- Established: January 2017
- Area: 1,321.0 km^{2} (510.0 sq mi)
- Population (2019): 110,772
  - Density: 83.855/km^{2} (217.18/sq mi)
- Website: loireforez.fr

Loire Forez Agglomération is the communauté d'agglomération, an intercommunal structure, centred on the city of Montbrison. It is located in the Loire department, in the Auvergne-Rhône-Alpes region, southeastern France. It was created in January 2017 by the merger of the former communauté d'agglomération de Loire Forez and three communautés de communes. Its area is 1321.0 km^{2}. Its population was 110,772 in 2019, of which 15,915 in Montbrison.

== Composition ==
The Loire Forez Agglomération consists of the following 84 communes:

1. Ailleux
2. Apinac
3. Arthun
4. Bard
5. Boën-sur-Lignon
6. Boisset-lès-Montrond
7. Boisset-Saint-Priest
8. Bonson
9. Bussy-Albieux
10. Cervières
11. Cezay
12. Chalain-d'Uzore
13. Chalain-le-Comtal
14. Chalmazel-Jeansagnière
15. La Chamba
16. Chambles
17. La Chambonie
18. Champdieu
19. La Chapelle-en-Lafaye
20. Châtelneuf
21. Chazelles-sur-Lavieu
22. Chenereilles
23. La Côte-Saint-Didier
24. Craintilleux
25. Écotay-l'Olme
26. Essertines-en-Châtelneuf
27. Estivareilles
28. Grézieux-le-Fromental
29. Gumières
30. L'Hôpital-le-Grand
31. Lavieu
32. Leigneux
33. Lérigneux
34. Lézigneux
35. Luriecq
36. Magneux-Haute-Rive
37. Marcilly-le-Châtel
38. Marcoux
39. Margerie-Chantagret
40. Marols
41. Merle-Leignec
42. Montarcher
43. Montbrison
44. Montverdun
45. Mornand-en-Forez
46. Noirétable
47. Palogneux
48. Périgneux
49. Pralong
50. Précieux
51. Roche-en-Forez
52. Sail-sous-Couzan
53. Sainte-Agathe-la-Bouteresse
54. Saint-Bonnet-le-Château
55. Saint-Bonnet-le-Courreau
56. Saint-Cyprien
57. Saint-Étienne-le-Molard
58. Sainte-Foy-Saint-Sulpice
59. Saint-Georges-en-Couzan
60. Saint-Georges-Haute-Ville
61. Saint-Hilaire-Cusson-la-Valmitte
62. Saint-Jean-la-Vêtre
63. Saint-Jean-Soleymieux
64. Saint-Just-en-Bas
65. Saint-Just-Saint-Rambert
66. Saint-Marcellin-en-Forez
67. Saint-Paul-d'Uzore
68. Saint-Priest-la-Vêtre
69. Saint-Romain-le-Puy
70. Saint-Sixte
71. Saint-Thomas-la-Garde
72. Sauvain
73. Savigneux
74. Soleymieux
75. Solore-en-Forez
76. Sury-le-Comtal
77. La Tourette
78. Trelins
79. Unias
80. Usson-en-Forez
81. La Valla-sur-Rochefort
82. Veauchette
83. Verrières-en-Forez
84. Vêtre-sur-Anzon
