= Écotay-l'Olme =

- Commune
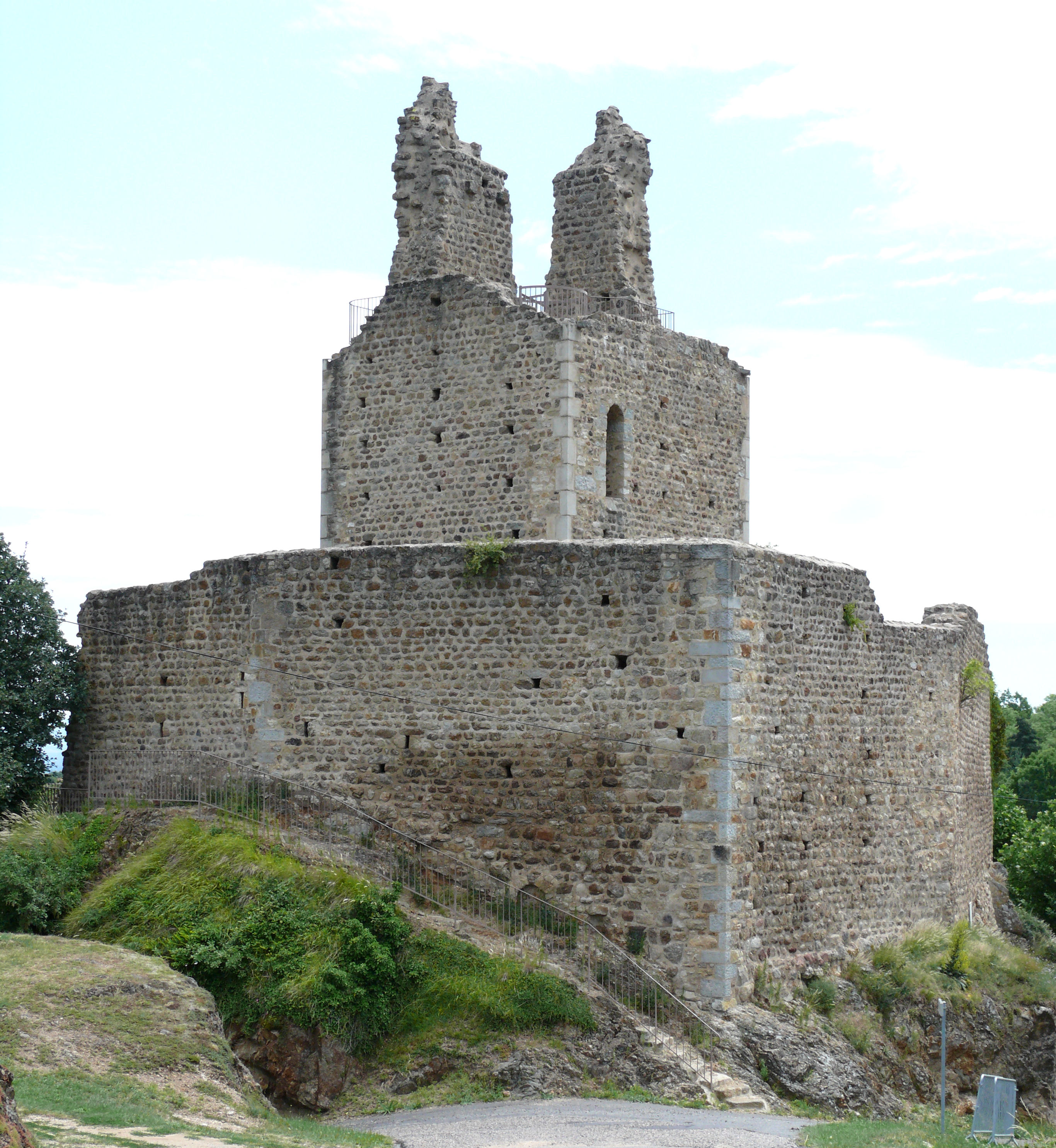
- Ruins of the keep

- Coat of arms
- Location of Écotay-l'Olme
- Location within France Location within Auvergne-Rhône-Alpes
- Coordinates: 45°35′23″N 4°02′26″E
- Country: France
- Region: Auvergne-Rhône-Alpes
- Department: Loire
- Arrondissement: Montbrison
- Canton: Montbrison
- Intercommunality: CA Loire Forez

Government
  - Mayor (2020–2026): Carine Gandrey
- Area^{1}: 6.52 km^{2} (2.52 sq mi)
- Elevation: 480 m (1,570 ft)
- Highest elevation: 667 m (2,188 ft)
- Lowest elevation: 416 m (1,365 ft)
- Population (2023): 1,334
  - Density: 205/km^{2} (530/sq mi)
- Time zone: UTC+01:00 (CET)
  - Summer (DST): UTC+02:00 (CEST)
- INSEE/Postal code: 42087 /42600
- ^{1} French Land Register data, which excludes lakes, ponds, glaciers > 1 km^{2} (0.386 sq mi or 247 acres) and river estuaries.

Écotay-l'Olme (French pronunciation: [ekɔtɛ lɔlm]) is a commune in the Loire department in central France.

== Population ==
Historical population
Year	Pop.	±% p.a.
1968	339	—
1975	598	+8.45%
1982	853	+5.20%
1990	1,001	+2.02%
1999	1,111	+1.17%
2007	1,116	+0.06%
2012	1,190	+1.29%
2017	1,212	+0.37%
2023	1,334	+1.61%
Source: INSEE

== See also ==
- Communes of the Loire department
