= Saint-Paul-d'Uzore =

- Commune
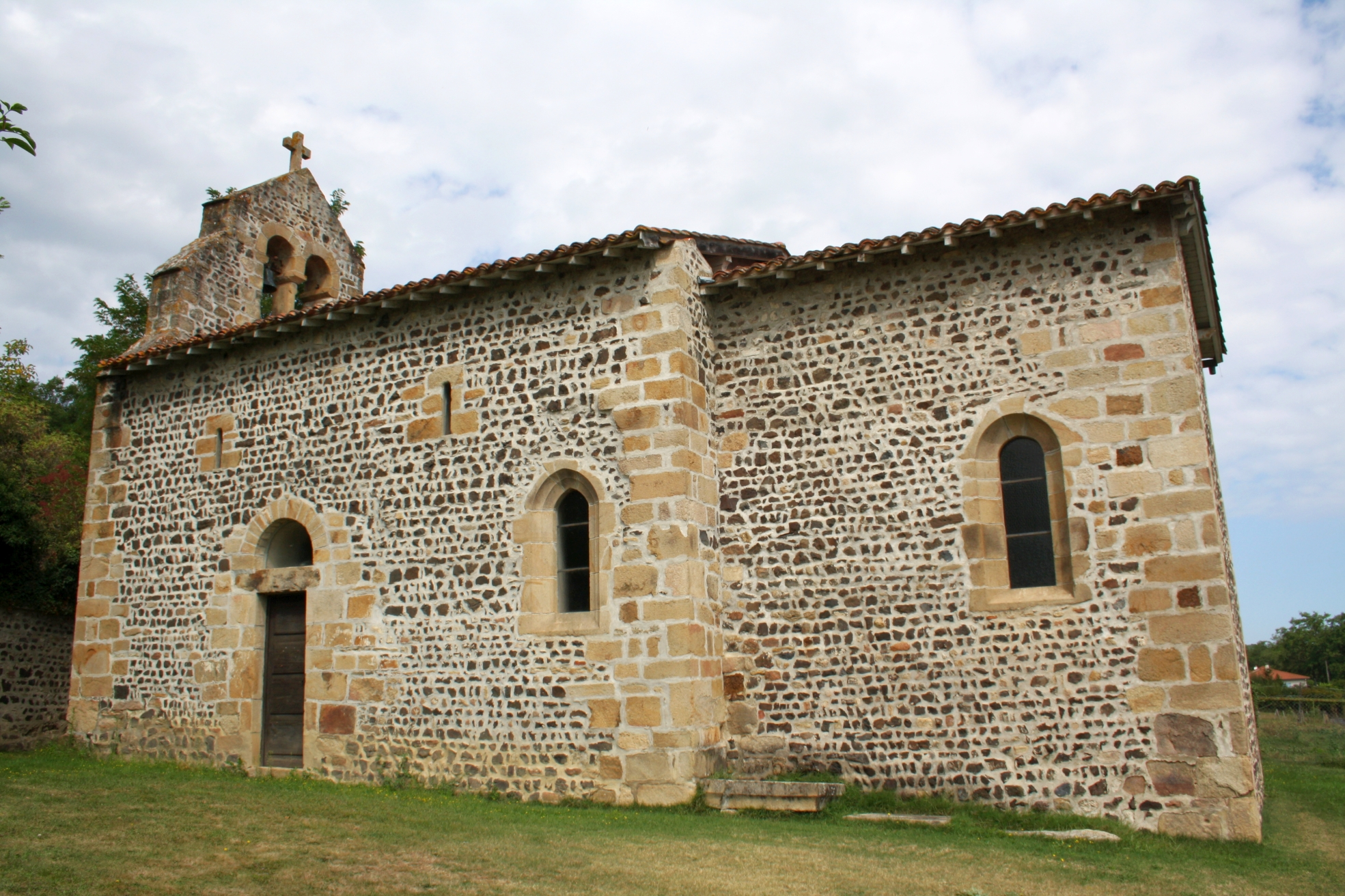

- Coat of arms
- Location of Saint-Paul-d'Uzore
- Location within France Location within Auvergne-Rhône-Alpes
- Coordinates: 45°40′44″N 4°04′52″E
- Country: France
- Region: Auvergne-Rhône-Alpes
- Department: Loire
- Arrondissement: Montbrison
- Canton: Montbrison
- Intercommunality: CA Loire Forez

Government
  - Mayor (2020–2026): Rambert Paliard
- Area^{1}: 9.51 km^{2} (3.67 sq mi)
- Elevation: 390 m (1,280 ft)
- Highest elevation: 520 m (1,710 ft)
- Lowest elevation: 350 m (1,150 ft)
- Population (2023): 203
  - Density: 21.3/km^{2} (55.3/sq mi)
- Time zone: UTC+01:00 (CET)
  - Summer (DST): UTC+02:00 (CEST)
- INSEE/Postal code: 42269 /42600
- ^{1} French Land Register data, which excludes lakes, ponds, glaciers > 1 km^{2} (0.386 sq mi or 247 acres) and river estuaries.

Saint-Paul-d'Uzore (French pronunciation: [sɛ̃ pɔl dy zɔʁ]) is a commune in the Loire department in central France.

== Population ==
Historical population
Year	Pop.	±% p.a.
1968	136	—
1975	119	−1.89%
1982	117	−0.24%
1990	95	−2.57%
1999	98	+0.35%
2007	121	+2.67%
2012	147	+3.97%
2017	170	+2.95%
2023	203	+3.00%
Source: INSEE

== See also ==
- Communes of the Loire department
