= Grézieux-le-Fromental =

Grézieux-le-Fromental Grèsiô (Arpitan)
- Commune
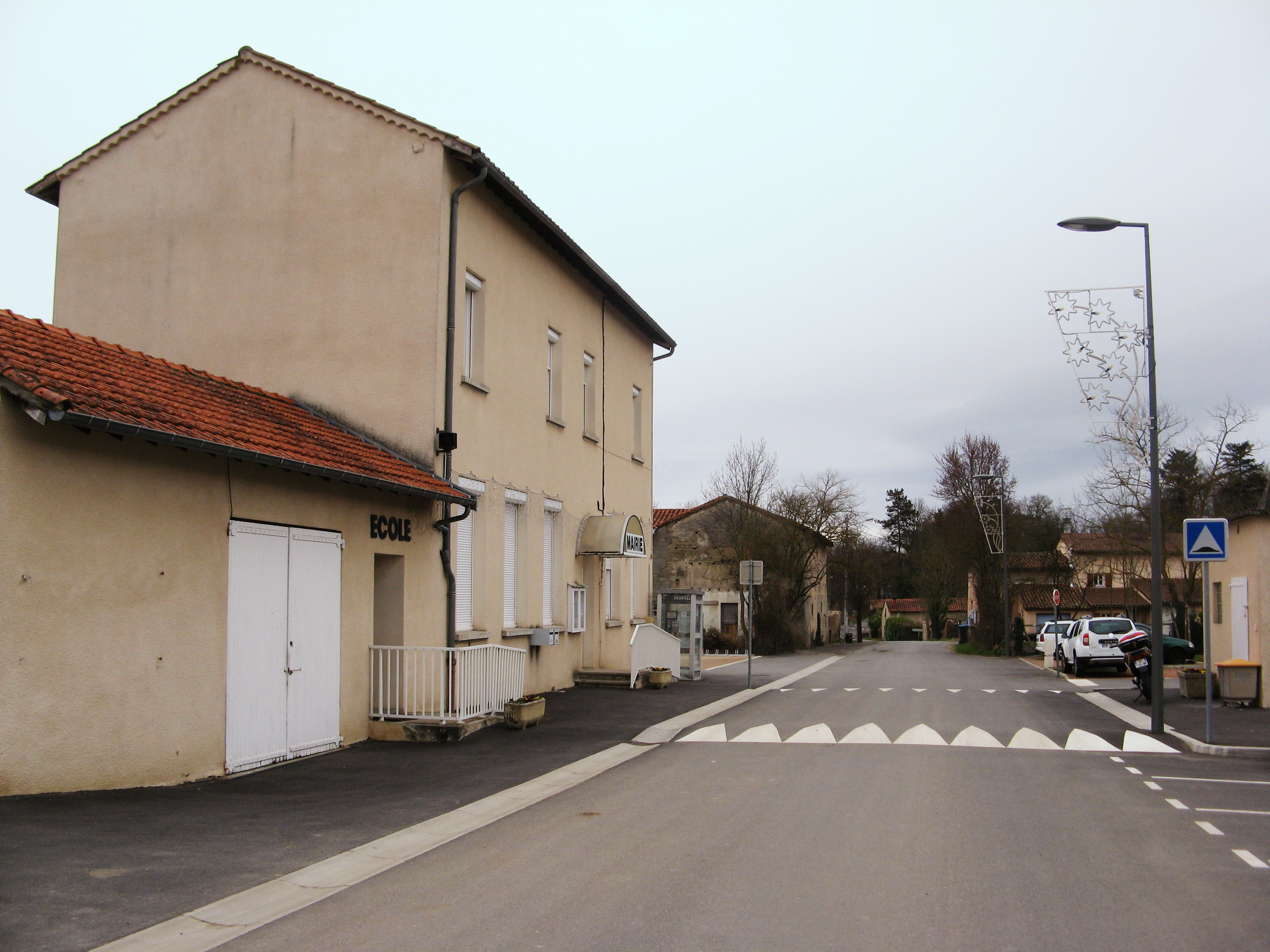
- Town hall
- Location of Grézieux-le-Fromental
- Location within France Location within Auvergne-Rhône-Alpes
- Coordinates: 45°37′07″N 4°09′12″E
- Country: France
- Region: Auvergne-Rhône-Alpes
- Department: Loire
- Arrondissement: Montbrison
- Canton: Montbrison
- Intercommunality: CA Loire Forez

Government
  - Mayor (2020–2026): Yannick Tourand
- Area^{1}: 10.31 km^{2} (3.98 sq mi)
- Elevation: 372 m (1,220 ft)
- Highest elevation: 389 m (1,276 ft)
- Lowest elevation: 351 m (1,152 ft)
- Population (2023): 254
  - Density: 24.6/km^{2} (63.8/sq mi)
- Time zone: UTC+01:00 (CET)
  - Summer (DST): UTC+02:00 (CEST)
- INSEE/Postal code: 42105 /42600
- ^{1} French Land Register data, which excludes lakes, ponds, glaciers > 1 km^{2} (0.386 sq mi or 247 acres) and river estuaries.

Grézieux-le-Fromental (French pronunciation: [ɡʁezjø lə fʁɔmɑ̃tal]; Arpitan: Grèsiô [ɡre.ˈzjø]) is a commune in the Loire department in central France.

== Population ==
Historical population
Year	Pop.	±% p.a.
1968	89	—
1975	83	−0.99%
1982	83	+0.00%
1990	115	+4.16%
1999	105	−1.01%
2007	109	+0.47%
2012	158	+7.71%
2017	233	+8.08%
2023	254	+1.45%
Source: INSEE

== See also ==
- Communes of the Loire department
