= Mornand-en-Forez =

- Commune
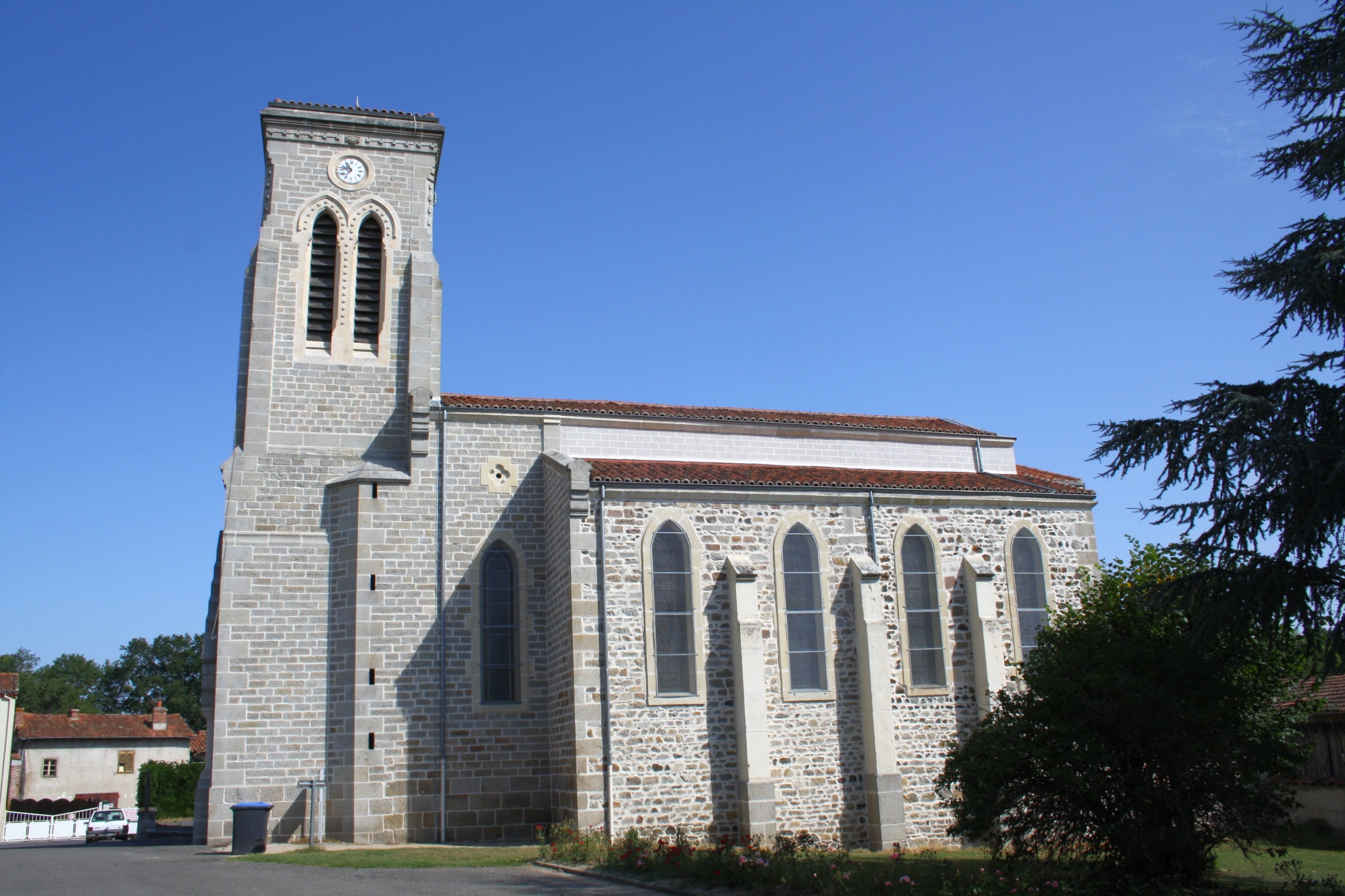
- Location of Mornand-en-Forez
- Location within France Location within Auvergne-Rhône-Alpes
- Coordinates: 45°40′50″N 4°07′33″E
- Country: France
- Region: Auvergne-Rhône-Alpes
- Department: Loire
- Arrondissement: Montbrison
- Canton: Montbrison
- Intercommunality: CA Loire Forez

Government
  - Mayor (2020–2026): Stéphanie Fayard
- Area^{1}: 21.6 km^{2} (8.3 sq mi)
- Elevation: 365 m (1,198 ft)
- Highest elevation: 385 m (1,263 ft)
- Lowest elevation: 343 m (1,125 ft)
- Population (2023): 427
  - Density: 19.8/km^{2} (51.2/sq mi)
- Time zone: UTC+01:00 (CET)
  - Summer (DST): UTC+02:00 (CEST)
- INSEE/Postal code: 42151 /42600
- ^{1} French Land Register data, which excludes lakes, ponds, glaciers > 1 km^{2} (0.386 sq mi or 247 acres) and river estuaries.

Mornand-en-Forez (French pronunciation: [mɔʁnɑ̃ ɑ̃ fɔʁɛ]; Arpitan: Mornant, before 2002: Mornand) is a commune in the Loire department in central France.

== Population ==
Historical population
Year	Pop.	±% p.a.
1968	343	—
1975	323	−0.85%
1982	284	−1.82%
1990	300	+0.69%
1999	294	−0.22%
2007	408	+4.18%
2012	407	−0.05%
2017	407	+0.00%
2023	427	+0.80%
Source: INSEE

== See also ==
- Communes of the Loire department
