= Chalain-d'Uzore =

- Commune
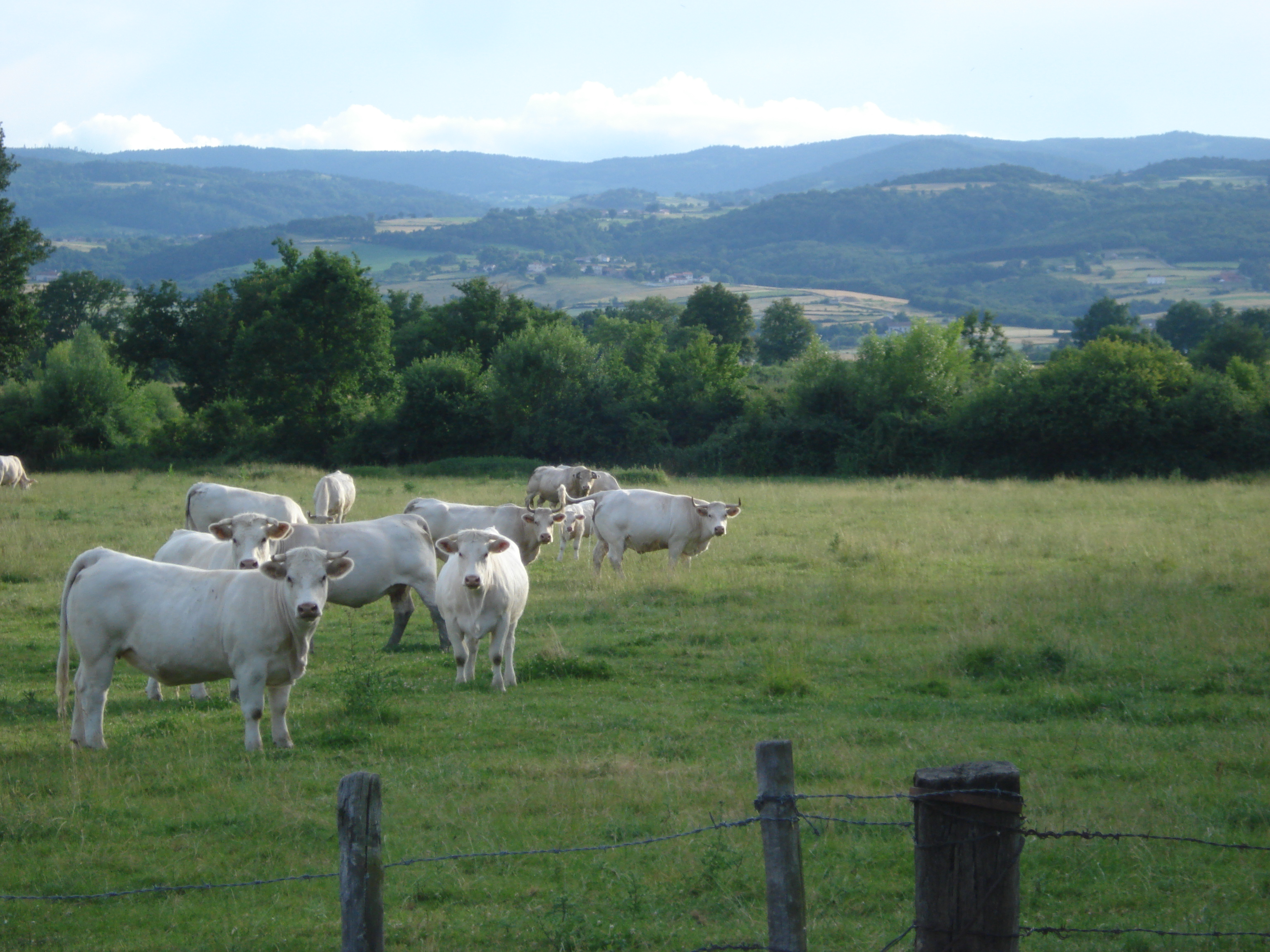

- Coat of arms
- Location of Chalain-d'Uzore
- Location within France Location within Auvergne-Rhône-Alpes
- Coordinates: 45°40′24″N 4°04′16″E
- Country: France
- Region: Auvergne-Rhône-Alpes
- Department: Loire
- Arrondissement: Montbrison
- Canton: Montbrison
- Intercommunality: CA Loire Forez

Government
  - Mayor (2020–2026): Sylvie Genebrier
- Area^{1}: 8.03 km^{2} (3.10 sq mi)
- Elevation: 400 m (1,300 ft)
- Highest elevation: 461 m (1,512 ft)
- Lowest elevation: 369 m (1,211 ft)
- Population (2023): 696
  - Density: 86.7/km^{2} (224/sq mi)
- Time zone: UTC+01:00 (CET)
  - Summer (DST): UTC+02:00 (CEST)
- INSEE/Postal code: 42037 /42600
- ^{1} French Land Register data, which excludes lakes, ponds, glaciers > 1 km^{2} (0.386 sq mi or 247 acres) and river estuaries.

Chalain-d'Uzore (French pronunciation: [ʃalɛ̃ dyzɔʁ]) is a commune in the Loire department in central France.

== Population ==
Historical population
Year	Pop.	±% p.a.
1968	233	—
1975	263	+1.75%
1982	337	+3.61%
1990	375	+1.34%
1999	443	+1.87%
2007	544	+2.60%
2012	539	−0.18%
2017	557	+0.66%
2023	696	+3.78%
Source: INSEE

== See also ==
- Communes of the Loire department
