= Gumières =

- Commune
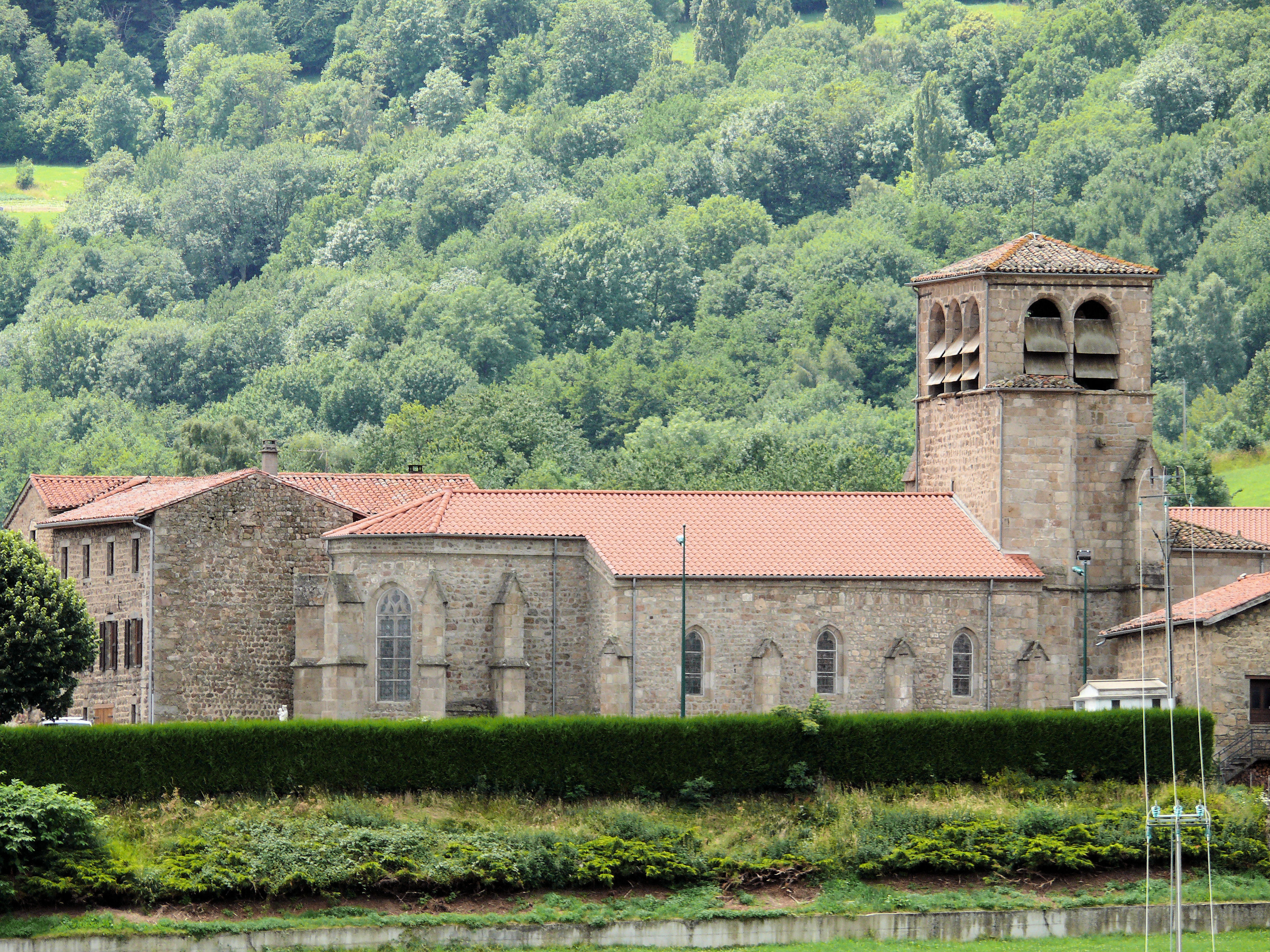

- Coat of arms
- Location of Gumières
- Location within France Location within Auvergne-Rhône-Alpes
- Coordinates: 45°31′55″N 3°59′17″E
- Country: France
- Region: Auvergne-Rhône-Alpes
- Department: Loire
- Arrondissement: Montbrison
- Canton: Montbrison
- Intercommunality: CA Loire Forez

Government
  - Mayor (2020–2026): Christian Cassulo
- Area^{1}: 16.12 km^{2} (6.22 sq mi)
- Elevation: 900 m (3,000 ft)
- Highest elevation: 1,236 m (4,055 ft)
- Lowest elevation: 748 m (2,454 ft)
- Population (2023): 325
  - Density: 20.2/km^{2} (52.2/sq mi)
- Time zone: UTC+01:00 (CET)
  - Summer (DST): UTC+02:00 (CEST)
- INSEE/Postal code: 42107 /42560
- ^{1} French Land Register data, which excludes lakes, ponds, glaciers > 1 km^{2} (0.386 sq mi or 247 acres) and river estuaries.

Gumières (French pronunciation: [ɡymjɛʁ]) is a commune in the Loire department in central France.

== Population ==
Historical population
Year	Pop.	±% p.a.
1968	387	—
1975	307	−3.25%
1982	250	−2.89%
1990	257	+0.35%
1999	253	−0.17%
2007	276	+1.09%
2012	320	+3.00%
2017	322	+0.12%
2023	325	+0.15%
Source: INSEE

== See also ==
- Communes of the Loire department
