= Boisset-lès-Montrond =

- Commune
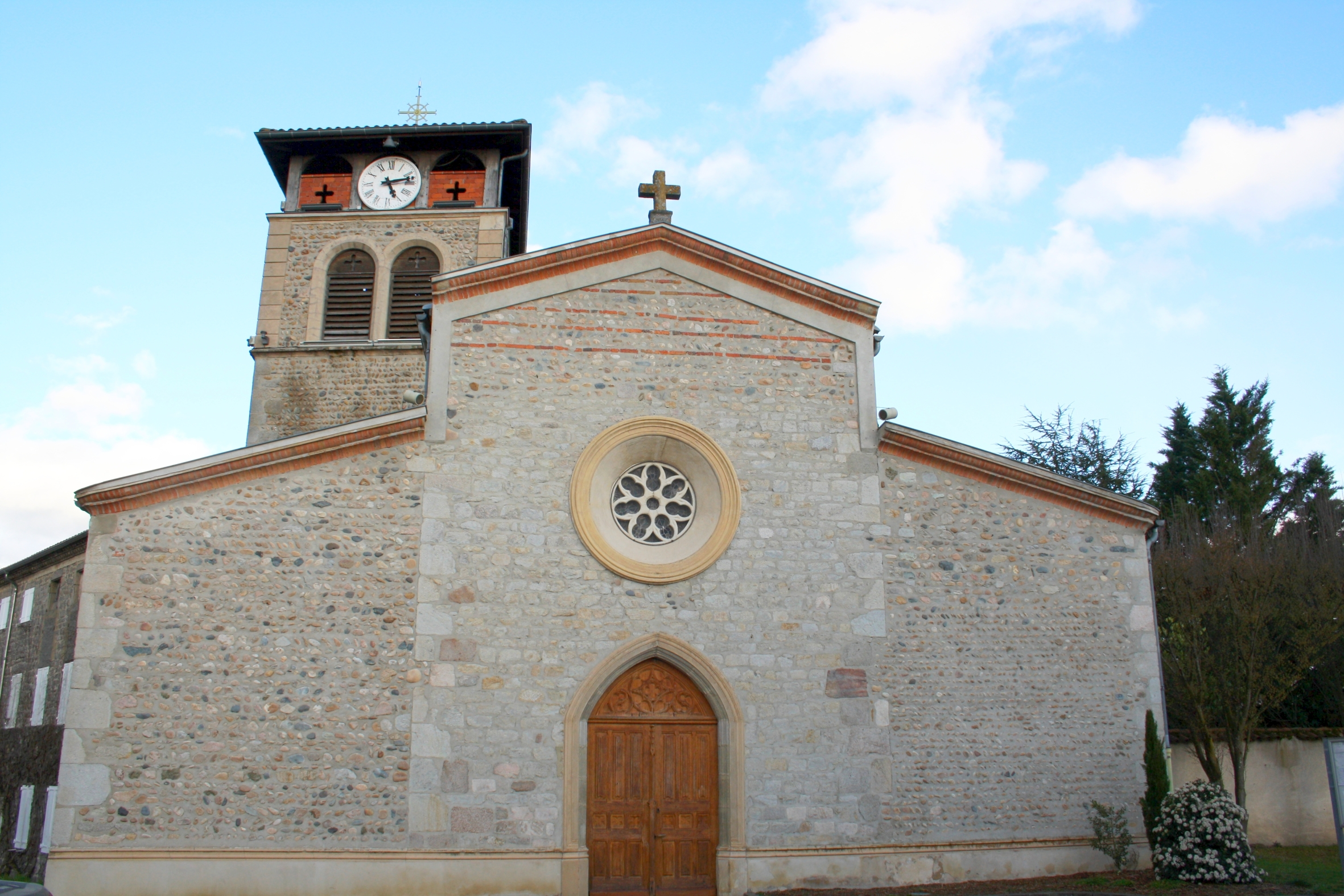
- Church of Saint-Blaise
- Location of Boisset-lès-Montrond
- Location within France Location within Auvergne-Rhône-Alpes
- Coordinates: 45°37′20″N 4°12′47″E
- Country: France
- Region: Auvergne-Rhône-Alpes
- Department: Loire
- Arrondissement: Montbrison
- Canton: Andrézieux-Bouthéon
- Intercommunality: CA Loire Forez

Government
  - Mayor (2020–2026): Claudine Court
- Area^{1}: 8.01 km^{2} (3.09 sq mi)
- Elevation: 345 m (1,132 ft)
- Highest elevation: 379 m (1,243 ft)
- Lowest elevation: 337 m (1,106 ft)
- Population (2023): 1,212
  - Density: 151/km^{2} (392/sq mi)
- Time zone: UTC+01:00 (CET)
  - Summer (DST): UTC+02:00 (CEST)
- INSEE/Postal code: 42020 /42210
- ^{1} French Land Register data, which excludes lakes, ponds, glaciers > 1 km^{2} (0.386 sq mi or 247 acres) and river estuaries.

Boisset-lès-Montrond is a commune in the Loire department in central France.

== Population ==
Historical population
Year	Pop.	±% p.a.
1968	517	—
1975	523	+0.16%
1982	633	+2.76%
1990	670	+0.71%
1999	828	+2.38%
2007	1,024	+2.69%
2012	1,124	+1.88%
2017	1,167	+0.75%
2023	1,212	+0.63%
Source: INSEE

== See also ==
- Communes of the Loire department
