= Chalain-le-Comtal =

- Commune
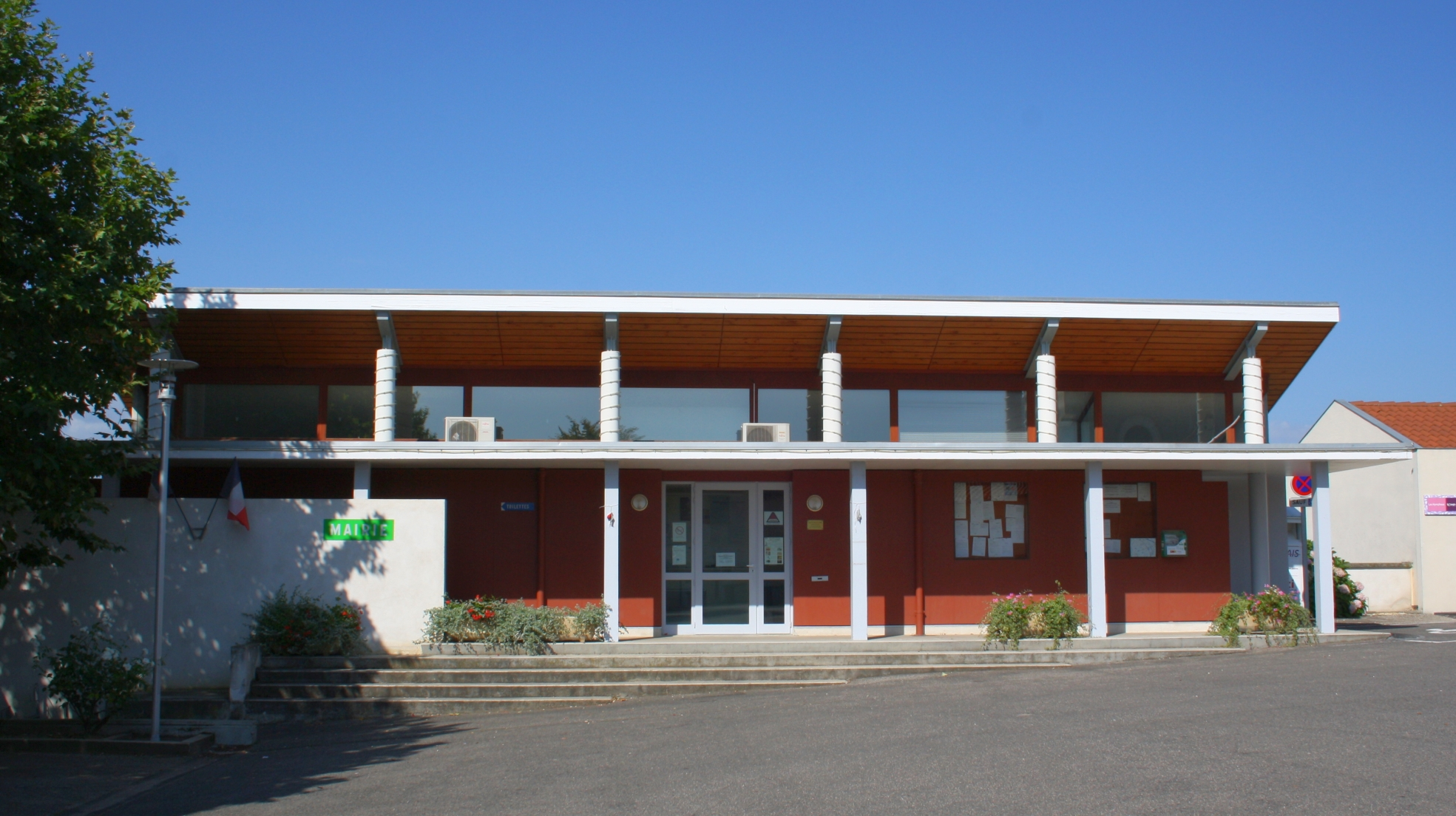
- Town hall

- Coat of arms
- Location of Chalain-le-Comtal
- Location within France Location within Auvergne-Rhône-Alpes
- Coordinates: 45°38′46″N 4°10′15″E
- Country: France
- Region: Auvergne-Rhône-Alpes
- Department: Loire
- Arrondissement: Montbrison
- Canton: Montbrison
- Intercommunality: CA Loire Forez

Government
  - Mayor (2020–2026): Alféo Guiotto
- Area^{1}: 18.36 km^{2} (7.09 sq mi)
- Elevation: 380 m (1,250 ft)
- Highest elevation: 383 m (1,257 ft)
- Lowest elevation: 338 m (1,109 ft)
- Population (2023): 743
  - Density: 40.5/km^{2} (105/sq mi)
- Time zone: UTC+01:00 (CET)
  - Summer (DST): UTC+02:00 (CEST)
- INSEE/Postal code: 42038 /42600
- ^{1} French Land Register data, which excludes lakes, ponds, glaciers > 1 km^{2} (0.386 sq mi or 247 acres) and river estuaries.

Chalain-le-Comtal (French pronunciation: [ʃalɛ̃ lə kɔ̃tal]) is a commune in the Loire department in central France.

== Population ==
Historical population
Year	Pop.	±% p.a.
1968	385	—
1975	364	−0.80%
1982	357	−0.28%
1990	385	+0.95%
1999	454	+1.85%
2007	609	+3.74%
2012	693	+2.62%
2017	705	+0.34%
2023	743	+0.88%
Source: INSEE

== See also ==
- Communes of the Loire department
