= Soleymieux =

Soleymieux Solèmi (Arpitan)
- Commune
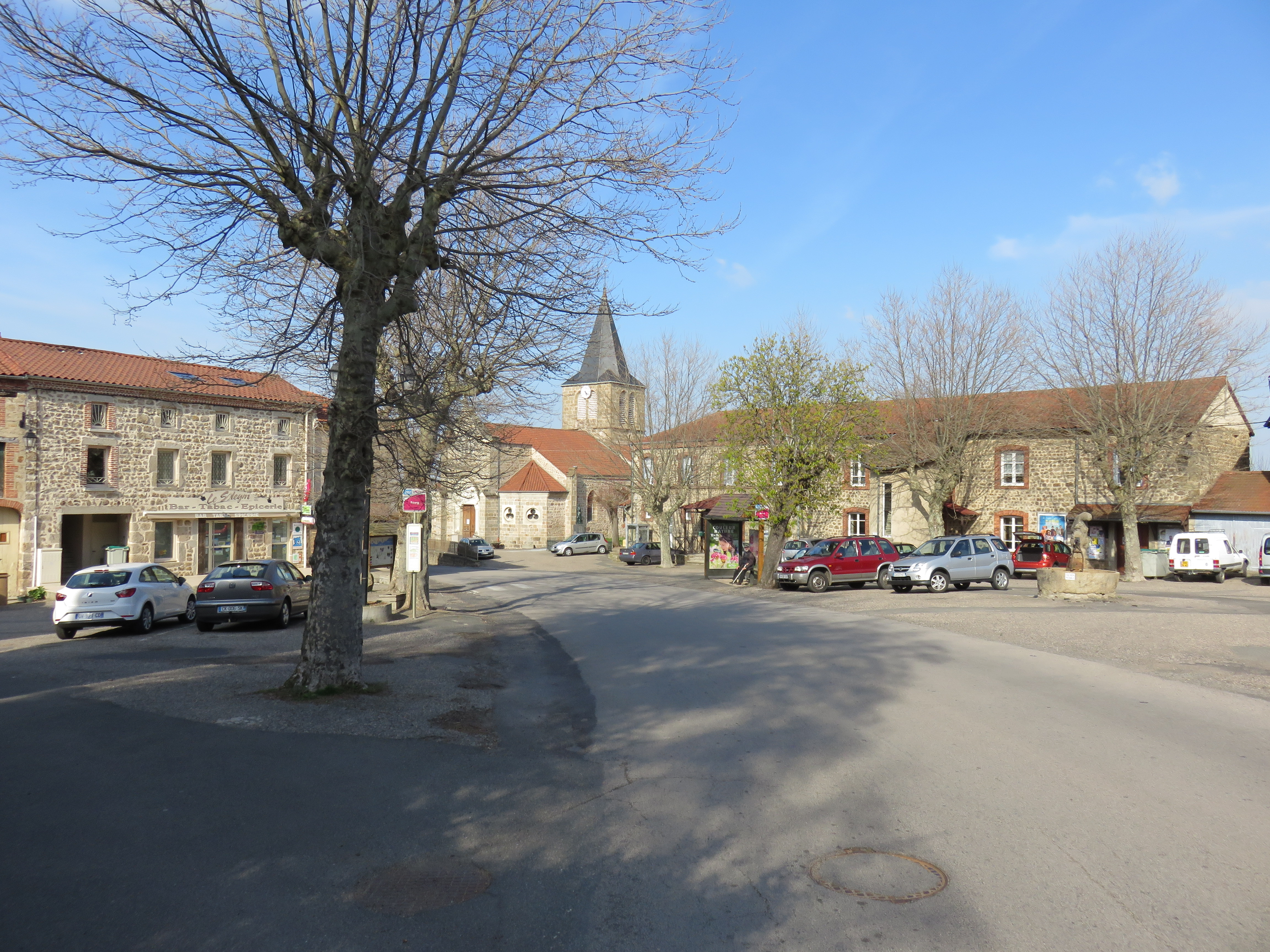

- Coat of arms
- Location of Soleymieux
- Location within France Location within Auvergne-Rhône-Alpes
- Coordinates: 45°30′34″N 4°02′34″E
- Country: France
- Region: Auvergne-Rhône-Alpes
- Department: Loire
- Arrondissement: Montbrison
- Canton: Montbrison
- Intercommunality: Loire Forez Agglomération

Government
  - Mayor (2020–2026): Julien Ronzier
- Area^{1}: 8.8 km^{2} (3.4 sq mi)
- Elevation: 703 m (2,306 ft)
- Highest elevation: 780 m (2,560 ft)
- Lowest elevation: 514 m (1,686 ft)
- Population (2023): 716
  - Density: 81/km^{2} (210/sq mi)
- Time zone: UTC+01:00 (CET)
  - Summer (DST): UTC+02:00 (CEST)
- INSEE/Postal code: 42301 /42560
- ^{1} French Land Register data, which excludes lakes, ponds, glaciers > 1 km^{2} (0.386 sq mi or 247 acres) and river estuaries.

Soleymieux (French pronunciation: [sɔlɛmjø]; Arpitan: Solèmi [sy.le.ˈmi]) is a commune in the Loire department in central France.

== Population ==
Historical population
Year	Pop.	±% p.a.
1968	358	—
1975	324	−1.42%
1982	374	+2.07%
1990	387	+0.43%
1999	470	+2.18%
2007	580	+2.66%
2012	680	+3.23%
2017	654	−0.78%
2023	716	+1.52%
Source: INSEE

== See also ==
- Communes of the Loire department
