= Margerie-Chantagret =

- Commune
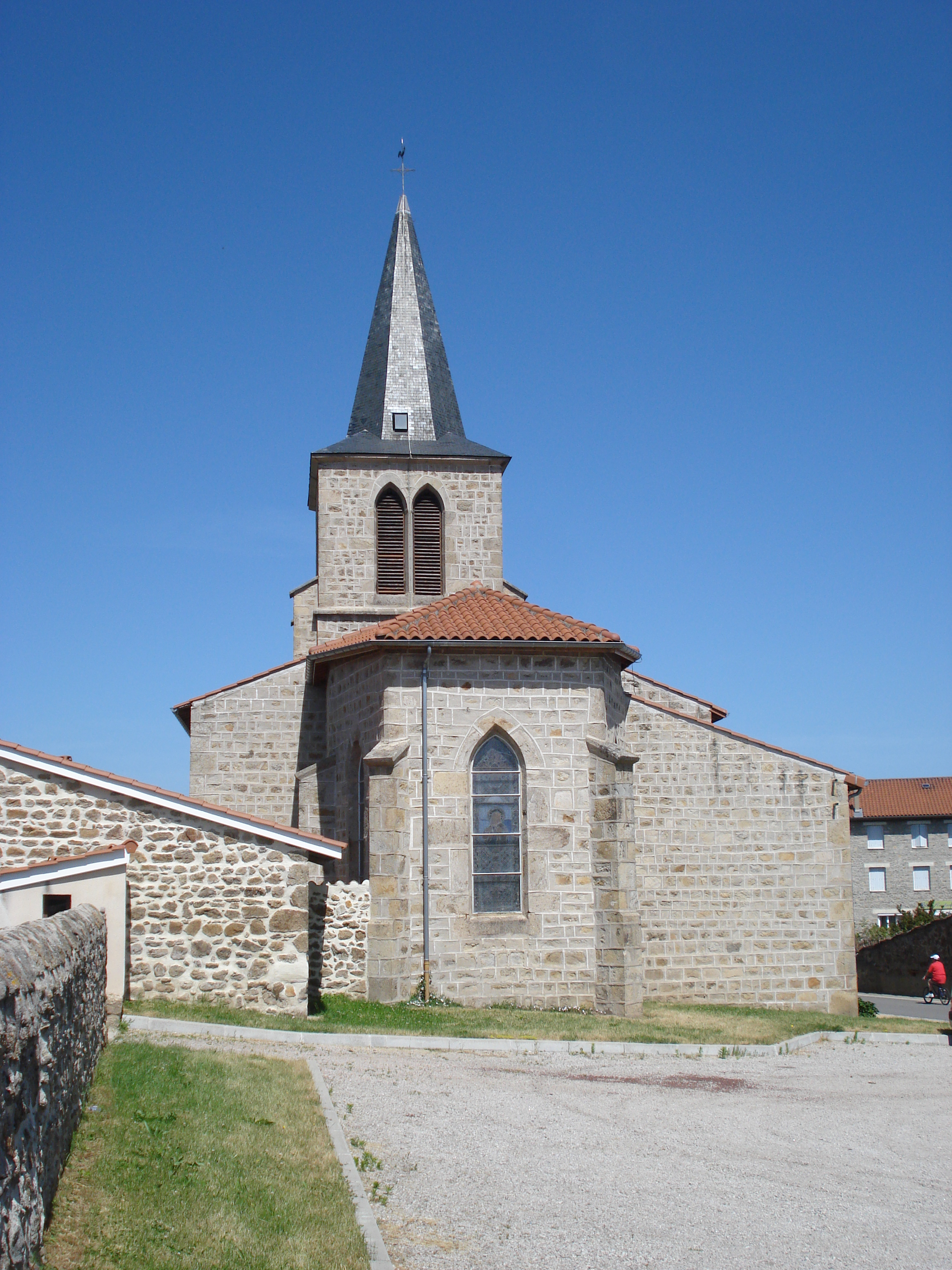

- Coat of arms
- Location of Margerie-Chantagret
- Location within France Location within Auvergne-Rhône-Alpes
- Coordinates: 45°31′33″N 4°04′03″E
- Country: France
- Region: Auvergne-Rhône-Alpes
- Department: Loire
- Arrondissement: Montbrison
- Canton: Montbrison
- Intercommunality: CA Loire Forez

Government
  - Mayor (2020–2026): Georges Boncompain
- Area^{1}: 7.71 km^{2} (2.98 sq mi)
- Elevation: 643 m (2,110 ft)
- Highest elevation: 802 m (2,631 ft)
- Lowest elevation: 491 m (1,611 ft)
- Population (2023): 860
  - Density: 110/km^{2} (290/sq mi)
- Time zone: UTC+01:00 (CET)
  - Summer (DST): UTC+02:00 (CEST)
- INSEE/Postal code: 42137 /42560
- ^{1} French Land Register data, which excludes lakes, ponds, glaciers > 1 km^{2} (0.386 sq mi or 247 acres) and river estuaries.

Margerie-Chantagret (French pronunciation: [maʁʒəʁi ʃɑ̃taɡʁɛ]) is a commune in the Loire department in central France.

== Population ==
Historical population
Year	Pop.	±% p.a.
1968	290	—
1975	264	−1.33%
1982	327	+3.10%
1990	390	+2.23%
1999	510	+3.03%
2007	652	+3.12%
2012	747	+2.76%
2017	805	+1.51%
2023	860	+1.11%
Source: INSEE

== See also ==
- Communes of the Loire department
