= Saint-Georges-Haute-Ville =

- Commune
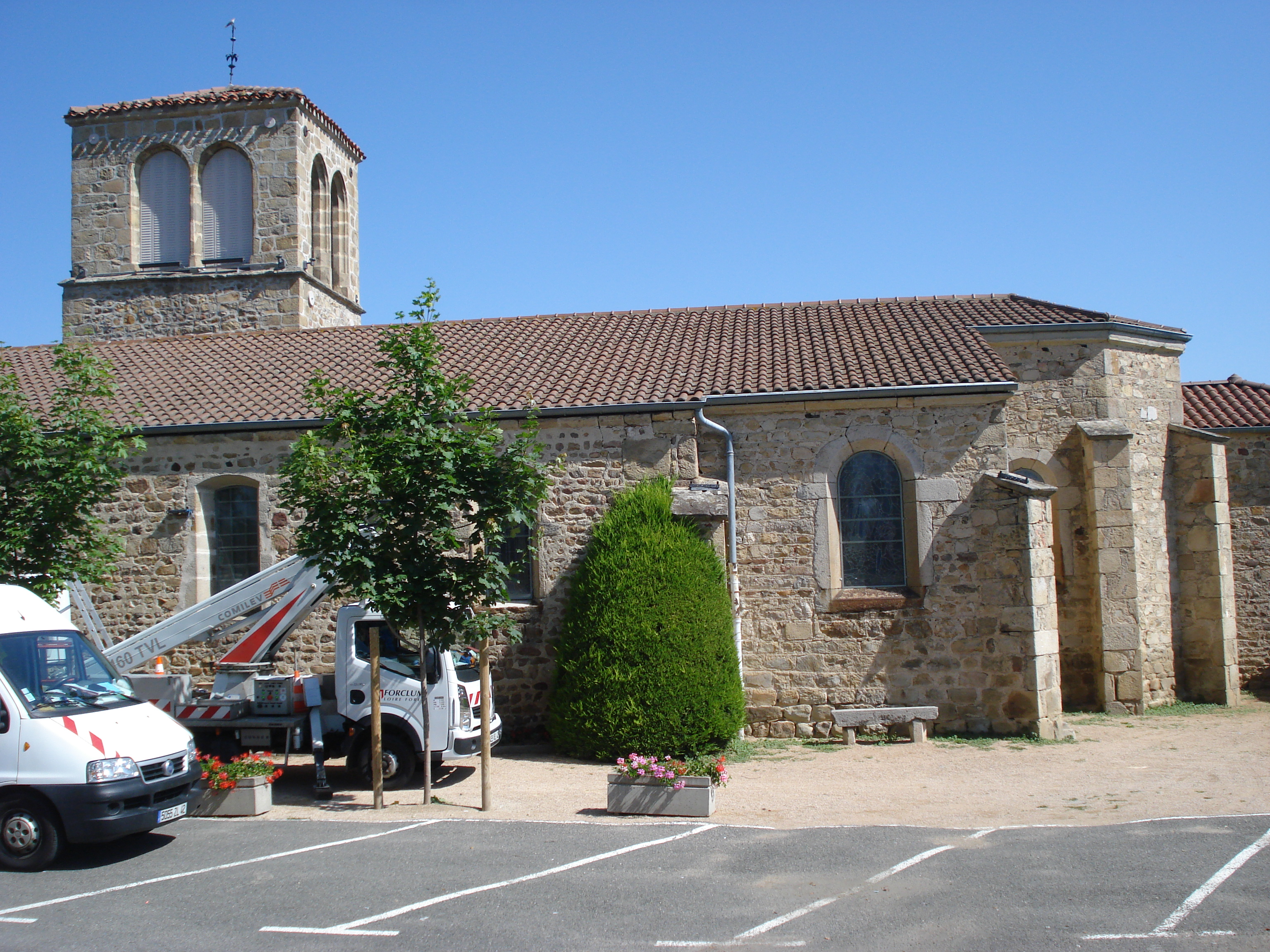
- Location of Saint-Georges-Haute-Ville
- Location within France Location within Auvergne-Rhône-Alpes
- Coordinates: 45°33′18″N 4°05′57″E
- Country: France
- Region: Auvergne-Rhône-Alpes
- Department: Loire
- Arrondissement: Montbrison
- Canton: Montbrison
- Intercommunality: CA Loire Forez

Government
  - Mayor (2020–2026): Frédéric Millet
- Area^{1}: 9.63 km^{2} (3.72 sq mi)
- Elevation: 468 m (1,535 ft)
- Highest elevation: 655 m (2,149 ft)
- Lowest elevation: 400 m (1,300 ft)
- Population (2023): 1,453
  - Density: 151/km^{2} (391/sq mi)
- Time zone: UTC+01:00 (CET)
  - Summer (DST): UTC+02:00 (CEST)
- INSEE/Postal code: 42228 /42610
- ^{1} French Land Register data, which excludes lakes, ponds, glaciers > 1 km^{2} (0.386 sq mi or 247 acres) and river estuaries.

Saint-Georges-Haute-Ville (French pronunciation: [sɛ̃ ʒɔʁʒ ot vil]) is a commune in the Loire department in central France.

== Population ==
Historical population
Year	Pop.	±% p.a.
1968	516	—
1975	604	+2.28%
1982	779	+3.70%
1990	1,035	+3.62%
1999	1,122	+0.90%
2007	1,228	+1.13%
2012	1,324	+1.52%
2017	1,440	+1.69%
2023	1,453	+0.15%
Source: INSEE

== See also ==
- Communes of the Loire department
