= Saint-Jean-Soleymieux =

Saint-Jean-Soleymieux Sent-Jouan-Solèmi (Arpitan)
- Commune
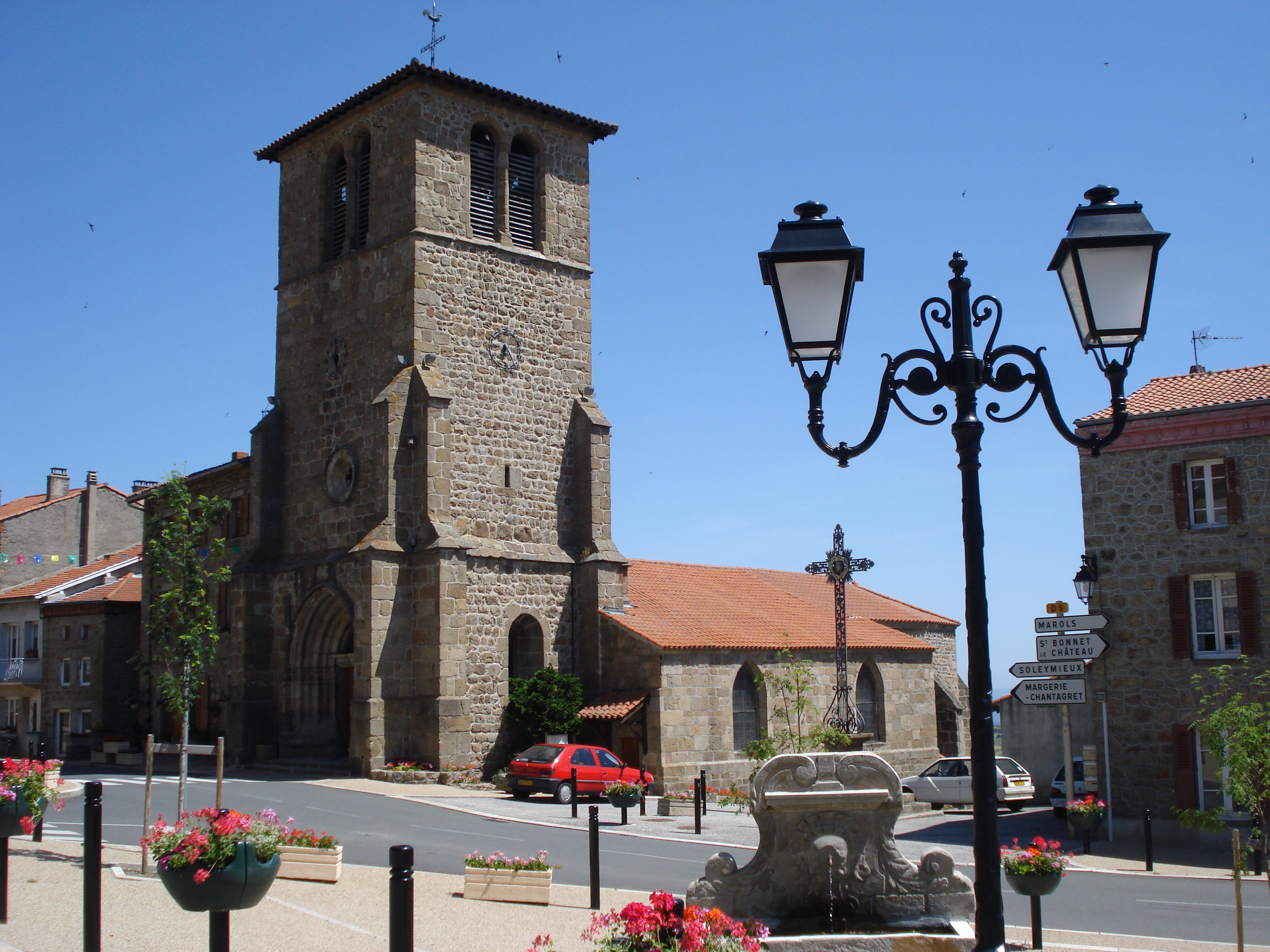

- Coat of arms
- Location of Saint-Jean-Soleymieux
- Location within France Location within Auvergne-Rhône-Alpes
- Coordinates: 45°30′16″N 4°02′23″E
- Country: France
- Region: Auvergne-Rhône-Alpes
- Department: Loire
- Arrondissement: Montbrison
- Canton: Montbrison
- Intercommunality: CA Loire Forez

Government
  - Mayor (2020–2026): Évelyne Chouvier
- Area^{1}: 16.47 km^{2} (6.36 sq mi)
- Elevation: 743 m (2,438 ft)
- Highest elevation: 1,204 m (3,950 ft)
- Lowest elevation: 699 m (2,293 ft)
- Population (2023): 840
  - Density: 51/km^{2} (130/sq mi)
- Time zone: UTC+01:00 (CET)
  - Summer (DST): UTC+02:00 (CEST)
- INSEE/Postal code: 42240 /42560
- ^{1} French Land Register data, which excludes lakes, ponds, glaciers > 1 km^{2} (0.386 sq mi or 247 acres) and river estuaries.

Saint-Jean-Soleymieux (French pronunciation: [sɛ̃ ʒɑ̃ sɔlemjø]; Arpitan: Sent-Jouan-Solèmi [sɛ̃ dzɥã sy.le.ˈmi]) is a commune in the Loire department in central France.

== Population ==
Historical population
Year	Pop.	±% p.a.
1968	584	—
1975	548	−0.90%
1982	581	+0.84%
1990	683	+2.04%
1999	726	+0.68%
2007	778	+0.87%
2012	843	+1.62%
2017	860	+0.40%
2023	840	−0.39%
Source: INSEE

== International relations ==
Saint-Jean-Soleymieux is twinned with Allesley, near Coventry, United Kingdom.

== See also ==
- Communes of the Loire department
