= Savigneux, Loire =

Savigneux
- Commune
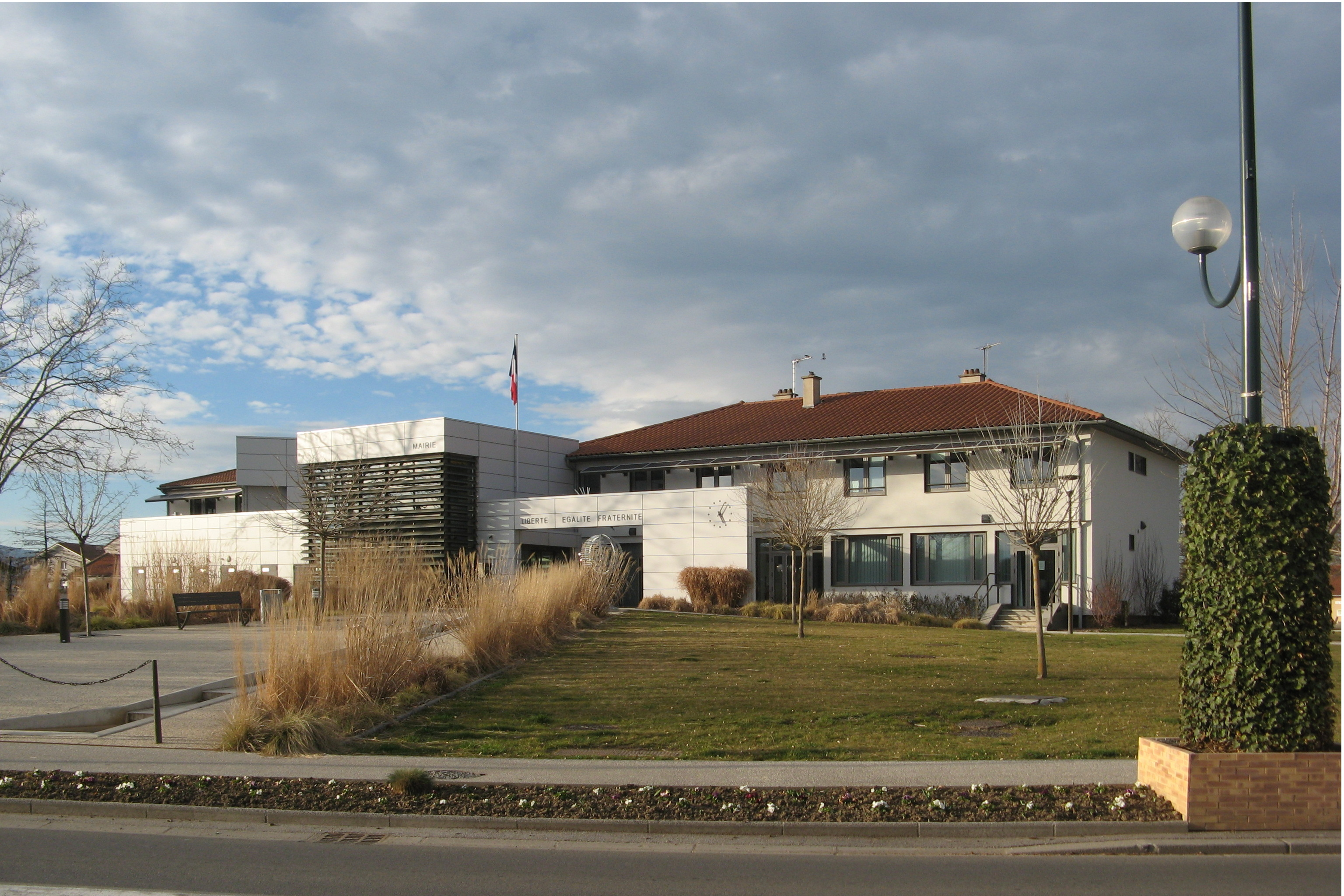
- Town hall

- Coat of arms
- Location of Savigneux
- Location within France Location within Auvergne-Rhône-Alpes
- Coordinates: 45°36′28″N 4°05′00″E
- Country: France
- Region: Auvergne-Rhône-Alpes
- Department: Loire
- Arrondissement: Montbrison
- Canton: Montbrison
- Intercommunality: Loire Forez Agglomération

Government
  - Mayor (2024–2026): Marie-Thérèse Gagnaire
- Area^{1}: 19.19 km^{2} (7.41 sq mi)
- Elevation: 383 m (1,257 ft)
- Highest elevation: 398 m (1,306 ft)
- Lowest elevation: 357 m (1,171 ft)
- Population (2023): 3,509
  - Density: 182.9/km^{2} (473.6/sq mi)
- Time zone: UTC+01:00 (CET)
  - Summer (DST): UTC+02:00 (CEST)
- INSEE/Postal code: 42299 /42600
- ^{1} French Land Register data, which excludes lakes, ponds, glaciers > 1 km^{2} (0.386 sq mi or 247 acres) and river estuaries.

Savigneux (French pronunciation: [saviɲø]) is a commune in the Loire department in central France.

== Population ==
Historical population

Year	Pop.	±% p.a.
1793	400	—
1821	391	−0.08%
1846	523	+1.17%
1872	733	+1.31%
1901	1,095	+1.39%
1926	1,304	+0.70%
1946	1,341	+0.14%
1962	1,586	+1.05%
1968	1,754	+1.69%

Year	Pop.	±% p.a.
1975	1,841	+0.69%
1982	1,821	−0.16%
1990	2,391	+3.46%
1999	2,565	+0.78%
2007	3,066	+2.26%
2012	3,353	+1.81%
2017	3,432	+0.47%
2023	3,509	+0.37%

Source: EHESS and INSEE (1968-2023)

== Twin towns ==
Savigneux is twinned with:

- Essenbach, Germany
- Savignano Irpino, Italy
- Rosenau, Haut-Rhin, France

== See also ==
- Communes of the Loire department
