= Boisset-Saint-Priest =

- Commune
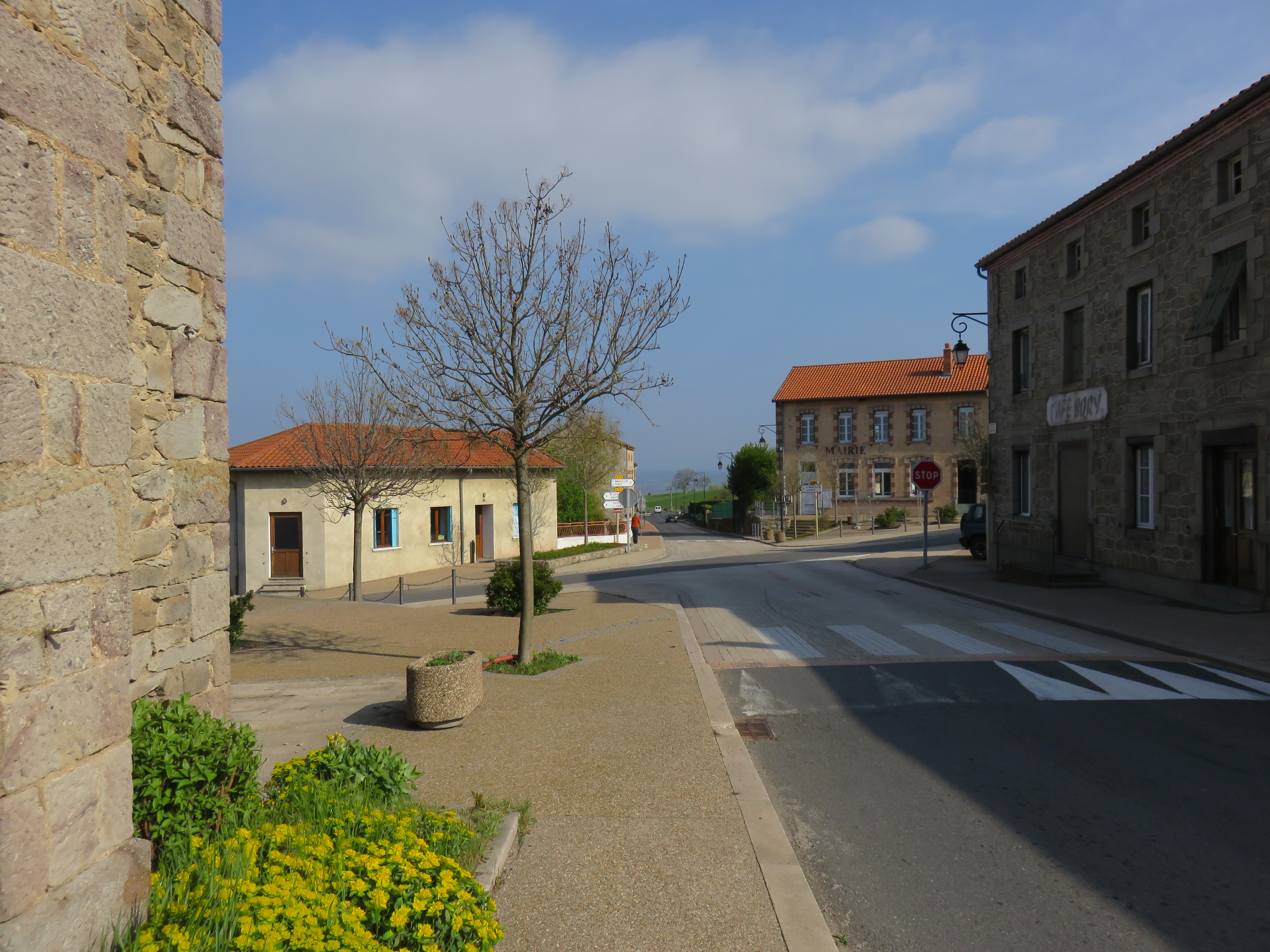
- Location of Boisset-Saint-Priest
- Location within France Location within Auvergne-Rhône-Alpes
- Coordinates: 45°30′50″N 4°06′18″E
- Country: France
- Region: Auvergne-Rhône-Alpes
- Department: Loire
- Arrondissement: Montbrison
- Canton: Montbrison
- Intercommunality: CA Loire Forez

Government
  - Mayor (2020–2026): Andre Gay
- Area^{1}: 18.28 km^{2} (7.06 sq mi)
- Elevation: 600 m (2,000 ft)
- Highest elevation: 645 m (2,116 ft)
- Lowest elevation: 399 m (1,309 ft)
- Population (2023): 1,298
  - Density: 71.01/km^{2} (183.9/sq mi)
- Time zone: UTC+01:00 (CET)
  - Summer (DST): UTC+02:00 (CEST)
- INSEE/Postal code: 42021 /42560
- ^{1} French Land Register data, which excludes lakes, ponds, glaciers > 1 km^{2} (0.386 sq mi or 247 acres) and river estuaries.

Boisset-Saint-Priest (French pronunciation: [bwasɛ sɛ̃ pʁijɛ(st)]) is a commune in the Loire department in central France.

== Population ==
Historical population
Year	Pop.	±% p.a.
1968	570	—
1975	539	−0.80%
1982	672	+3.20%
1990	793	+2.09%
1999	880	+1.16%
2007	1,027	+1.95%
2012	1,177	+2.76%
2017	1,223	+0.77%
2023	1,298	+1.00%
Source: INSEE

== See also ==
- Communes of the Loire department
