= Canton of Montbrison =

Coordinates: 45.6395°N 4.0745°E

Montbrison
- Canton
- Country: France
- Region: Auvergne-Rhône-Alpes
- Department: Loire
- No. of communes: {{{nbcomm}}}
- Area: 409.67 km^{2} (158.17 sq mi)
- Population (2023): 42,598
  - Density: 103.98/km^{2} (269.31/sq mi)
- INSEE code: 42 07

The canton of Montbrison is a French administrative division located in the department of Loire and the Auvergne-Rhône-Alpes region. At the French canton reorganisation which came into effect in March 2015, the canton was expanded from 19 to 31 communes:

- Bard
- Boisset-Saint-Priest
- Chalain-d'Uzore
- Chalain-le-Comtal
- La Chapelle-en-Lafaye
- Chazelles-sur-Lavieu
- Chenereilles
- Écotay-l'Olme
- Grézieux-le-Fromental
- Gumières
- L'Hôpital-le-Grand
- Lavieu
- Lérigneux
- Lézigneux
- Luriecq
- Magneux-Haute-Rive
- Margerie-Chantagret
- Marols
- Montarcher
- Montbrison
- Mornand-en-Forez
- Précieux
- Roche-en-Forez
- Saint-Georges-Haute-Ville
- Saint-Jean-Soleymieux
- Saint-Paul-d'Uzore
- Saint-Romain-le-Puy
- Saint-Thomas-la-Garde
- Savigneux
- Soleymieux
- Verrières-en-Forez

== See also ==
- Cantons of the Loire department
