= Montarcher =

- Commune
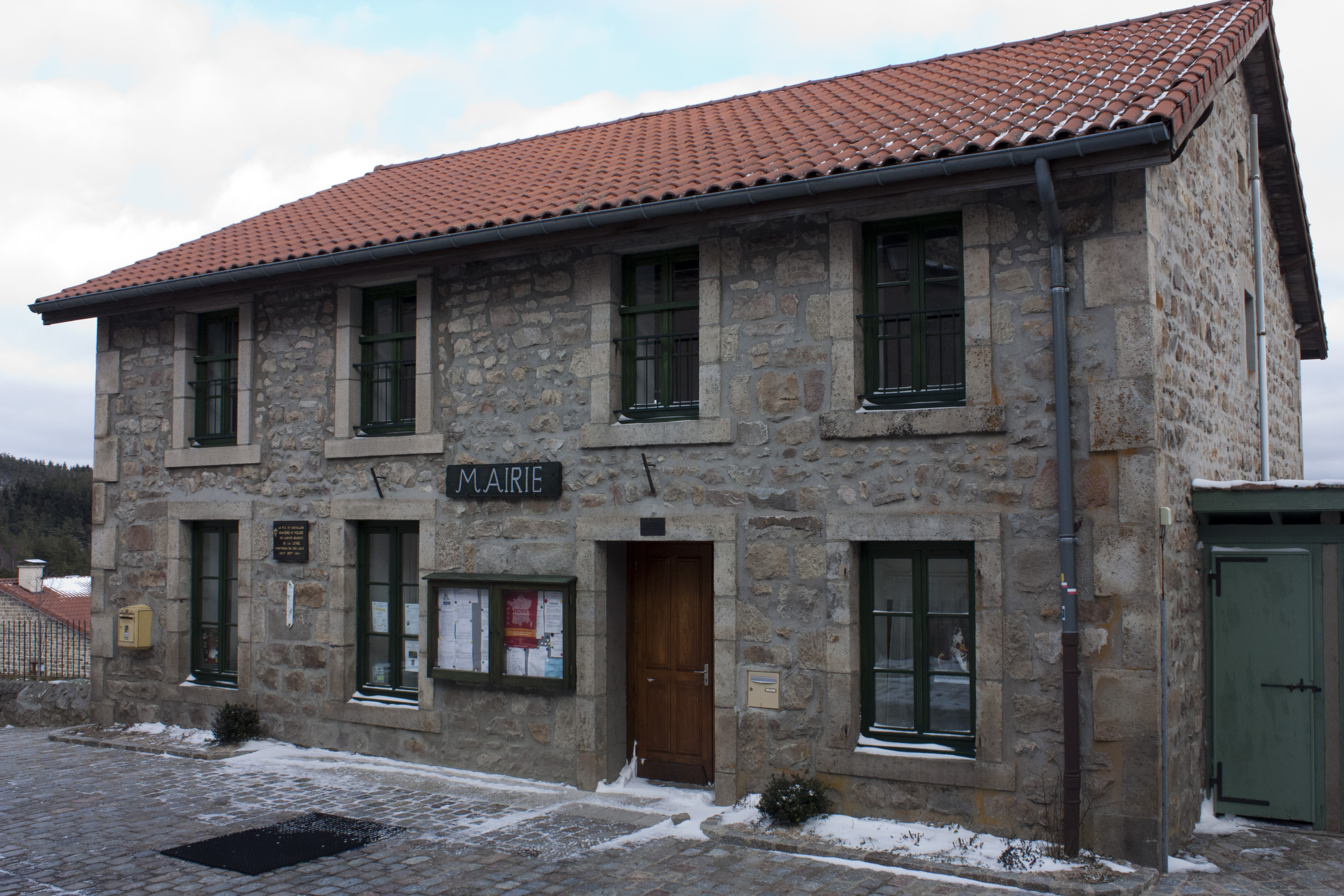
- Town hall

- Coat of arms
- Location of Montarcher
- Location within France Location within Auvergne-Rhône-Alpes
- Coordinates: 45°27′35″N 3°59′48″E
- Country: France
- Region: Auvergne-Rhône-Alpes
- Department: Loire
- Arrondissement: Montbrison
- Canton: Montbrison
- Intercommunality: CA Loire Forez

Government
  - Mayor (2020–2026): Bernard Coutanson
- Area^{1}: 5.99 km^{2} (2.31 sq mi)
- Elevation: 1,150 m (3,770 ft)
- Highest elevation: 1,194 m (3,917 ft)
- Lowest elevation: 938 m (3,077 ft)
- Population (2023): 63
  - Density: 11/km^{2} (27/sq mi)
- Time zone: UTC+01:00 (CET)
  - Summer (DST): UTC+02:00 (CEST)
- INSEE/Postal code: 42146 /42380
- ^{1} French Land Register data, which excludes lakes, ponds, glaciers > 1 km^{2} (0.386 sq mi or 247 acres) and river estuaries.

Montarcher is a commune in the Loire department in central France.

== Population ==
Historical population
Year	Pop.	±% p.a.
1968	87	—
1975	77	−1.73%
1982	54	−4.94%
1990	55	+0.23%
1999	75	+3.51%
2007	65	−1.77%
2012	66	+0.31%
2017	67	+0.30%
2023	63	−1.02%
Source: INSEE

== Geography ==
The commune lies in the southwestern part of the Loire department, 17 km southwest of Montbrison, 22 km southeast of Ambert and 30 km west of Saint-Étienne.

== See also ==
- Communes of the Loire department
