= Chenereilles, Loire =

Commune in Loire, Auvergne-Rhône-Alpes, France

Chenereilles
- Commune
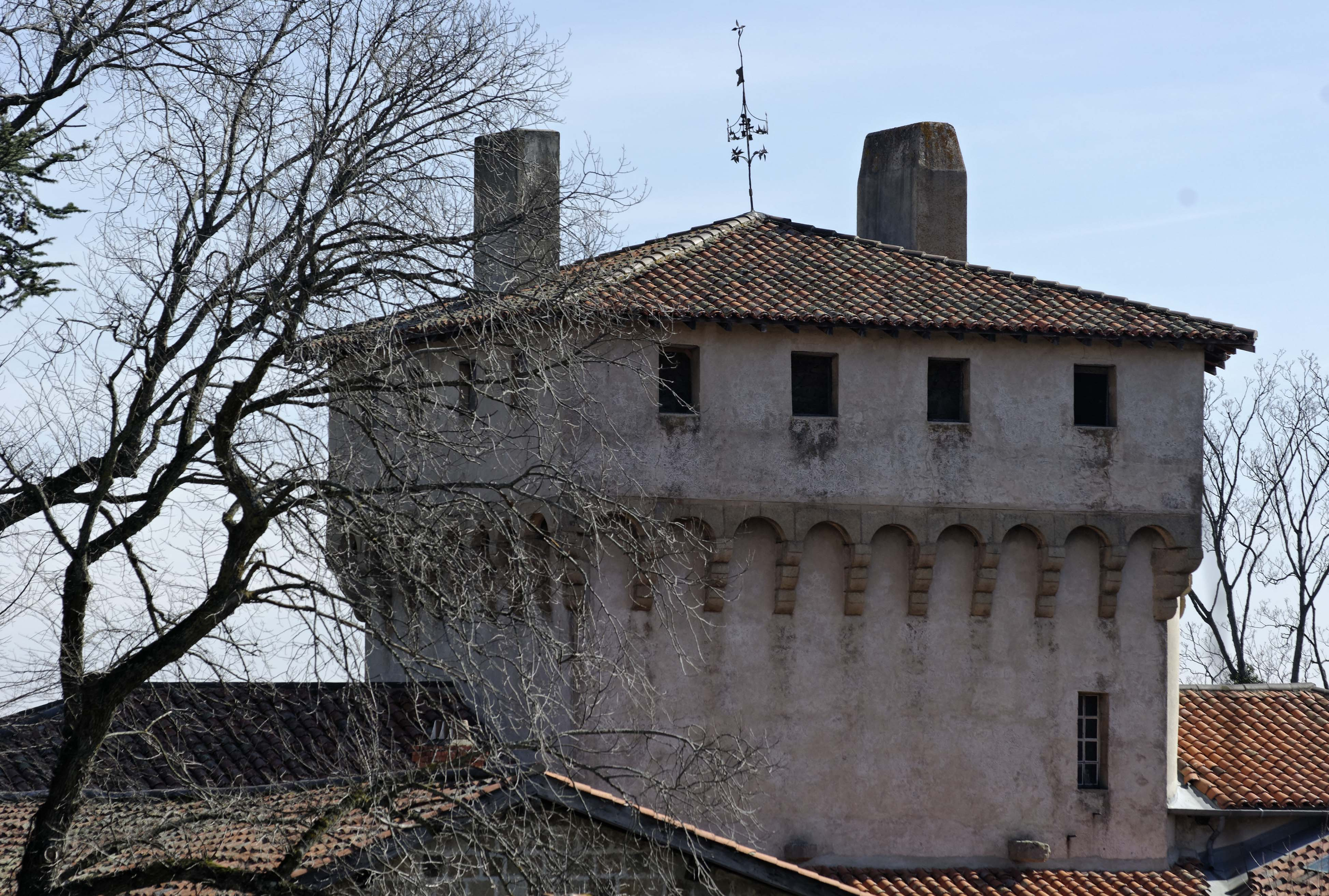
- Château de Chenereilles
- Location of Chenereilles
- Location within France Location within Auvergne-Rhône-Alpes
- Coordinates: 45°29′06″N 4°04′47″E
- Country: France
- Region: Auvergne-Rhône-Alpes
- Department: Loire
- Arrondissement: Montbrison
- Canton: Montbrison
- Intercommunality: CA Loire Forez

Government
  - Mayor (2020–2026): Roland Bost
- Area^{1}: 8.97 km^{2} (3.46 sq mi)
- Elevation: 675 m (2,215 ft)
- Highest elevation: 749 m (2,457 ft)
- Lowest elevation: 428 m (1,404 ft)
- Population (2023): 560
  - Density: 62/km^{2} (160/sq mi)
- Time zone: UTC+01:00 (CET)
  - Summer (DST): UTC+02:00 (CEST)
- INSEE/Postal code: 42060 /42560
- ^{1} French Land Register data, which excludes lakes, ponds, glaciers > 1 km^{2} (0.386 sq mi or 247 acres) and river estuaries.

Chenereilles (French pronunciation: [ʃənəʁɛj]; Occitan: Chanarelhas) is a commune in the Loire department in central France. It lies within the historical region of Forez and is part of the Loire Forez Agglomération.

== Geography ==
The commune is located in the arrondissement of Montbrison and the canton of Montbrison. According to INSEE, Chenereilles belongs to the functional urban area (aire d’attraction) of Saint-Étienne. Elevation ranges from 428 to 749 metres above sea level, for an area of 8.97 km².

== Population ==
Historical population
Year	Pop.	±% p.a.
1968	260	—
1975	209	−3.07%
1982	247	+2.42%
1990	264	+0.84%
1999	312	+1.87%
2007	444	+4.51%
2012	499	+2.36%
2017	523	+0.94%
2023	560	+1.15%
Source: INSEE

== Administration ==
The commune is administered by a municipal council headed by the mayor. For the 2020–2026 term the mayor is Roland Bost.

== Sights ==
- Château de Chenereilles – a medieval castle with later additions; the keep and inner courtyard façades are protected as a monument historique (classified 21 February 1983), with the remainder of the château listed the same day. It is recorded in the Ministry of Culture’s Mérimée database (ref. PA00117465).

== See also ==
- Communes of the Loire department
