= La Chapelle-en-Lafaye =

- Commune
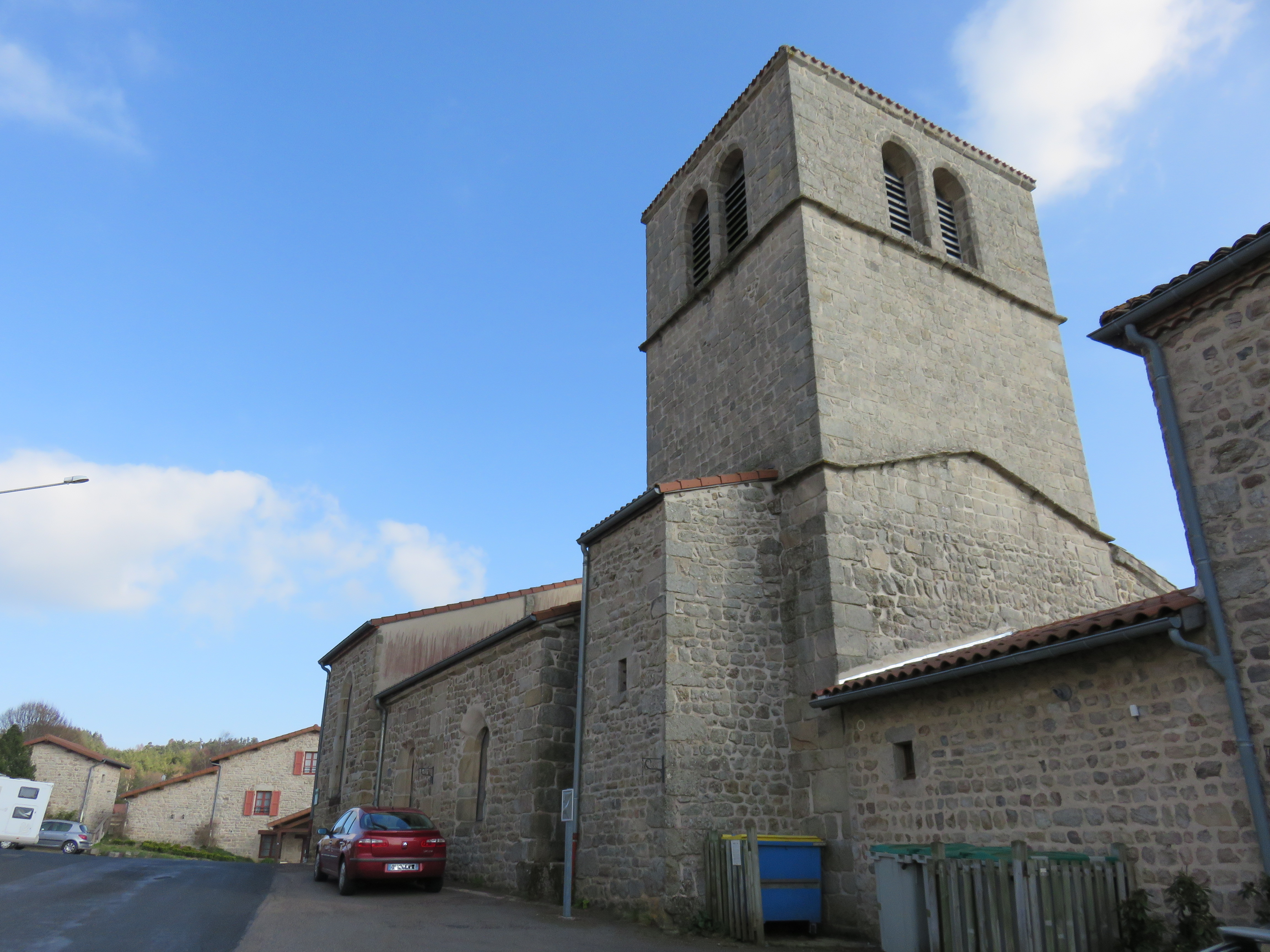
- The church of La Chapelle-en-Lafaye

- Coat of arms
- Location of La Chapelle-en-Lafaye
- Location within France Location within Auvergne-Rhône-Alpes
- Coordinates: 45°27′49″N 3°59′22″E
- Country: France
- Region: Auvergne-Rhône-Alpes
- Department: Loire
- Arrondissement: Montbrison
- Canton: Montbrison
- Intercommunality: CA Loire Forez

Government
  - Mayor (2020–2026): Jean-Philippe Montagne
- Area^{1}: 8.99 km^{2} (3.47 sq mi)
- Elevation: 1,080 m (3,540 ft)
- Highest elevation: 1,174 m (3,852 ft)
- Lowest elevation: 917 m (3,009 ft)
- Population (2023): 138
  - Density: 15.4/km^{2} (39.8/sq mi)
- Time zone: UTC+01:00 (CET)
  - Summer (DST): UTC+02:00 (CEST)
- INSEE/Postal code: 42050 /42380
- ^{1} French Land Register data, which excludes lakes, ponds, glaciers > 1 km^{2} (0.386 sq mi or 247 acres) and river estuaries.

La Chapelle-en-Lafaye is a commune in the Loire department in central France.

== Population ==
Historical population
| Year | Pop. | ±% p.a. |
|---|---|---|
| 1968 | 122 | — |
| 1975 | 116 | −0.72% |
| 1982 | 103 | −1.68% |
| 1990 | 101 | −0.24% |
| 1999 | 108 | +0.75% |
| 2007 | 110 | +0.23% |
| 2012 | 145 | +5.68% |
| 2017 | 113 | −4.86% |
| 2023 | 138 | +3.39% |
Source: INSEE

== See also ==
- Communes of the Loire department
