= Luriecq =

- Commune
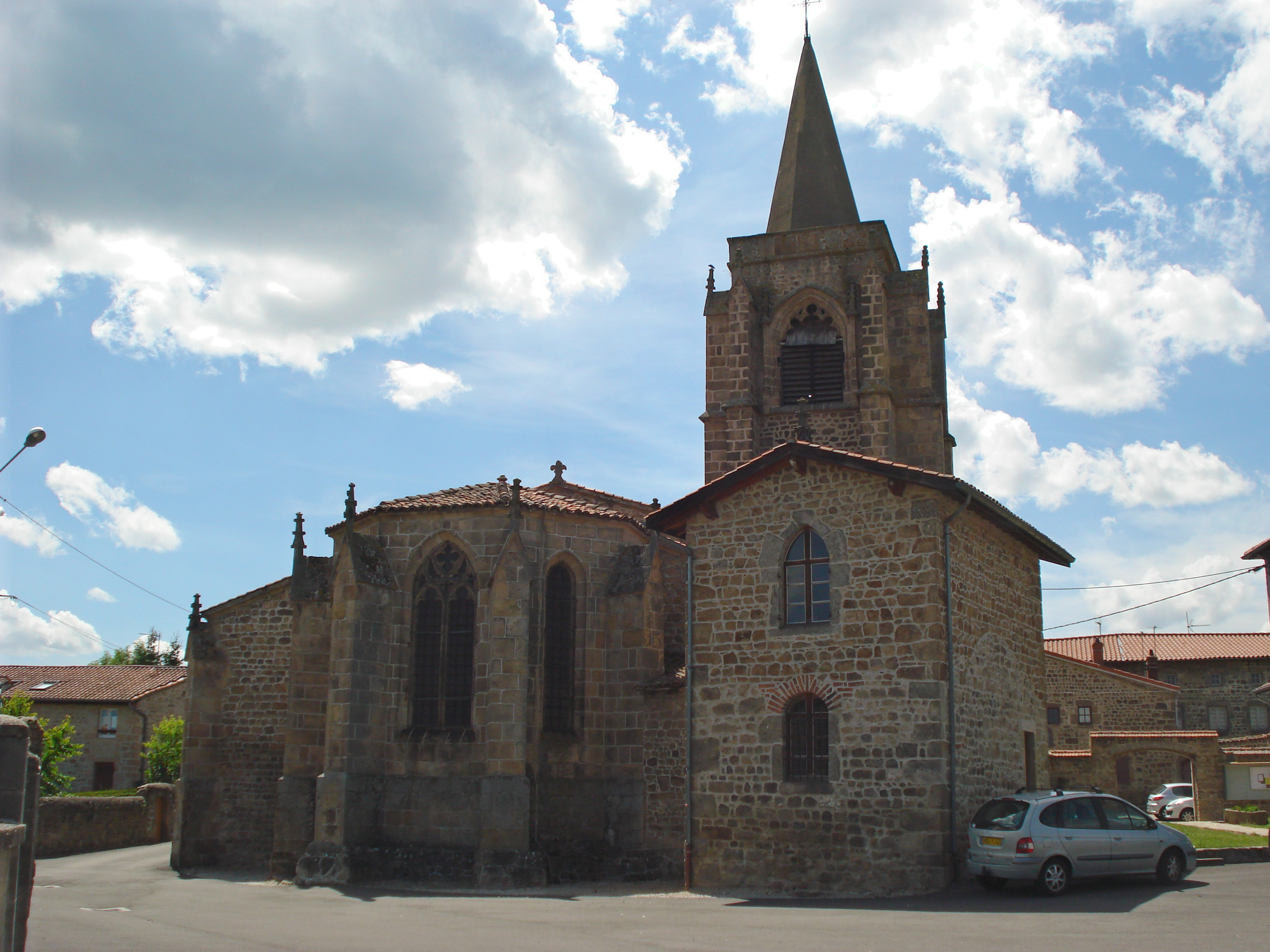
- Location of Luriecq
- Location within France Location within Auvergne-Rhône-Alpes
- Coordinates: 45°27′07″N 4°04′51″E
- Country: France
- Region: Auvergne-Rhône-Alpes
- Department: Loire
- Arrondissement: Montbrison
- Canton: Montbrison
- Intercommunality: CA Loire Forez

Government
  - Mayor (2020–2026): Alain Limousin
- Area^{1}: 20.28 km^{2} (7.83 sq mi)
- Elevation: 710 m (2,330 ft)
- Highest elevation: 1,120 m (3,670 ft)
- Lowest elevation: 480 m (1,570 ft)
- Population (2023): 1,238
  - Density: 61.05/km^{2} (158.1/sq mi)
- Time zone: UTC+01:00 (CET)
  - Summer (DST): UTC+02:00 (CEST)
- INSEE/Postal code: 42126 /42380
- ^{1} French Land Register data, which excludes lakes, ponds, glaciers > 1 km^{2} (0.386 sq mi or 247 acres) and river estuaries.

Luriecq (French pronunciation: [lyʁjɛk]) is a commune in the Loire department in central France.

== Population ==
Historical population
Year	Pop.	±% p.a.
1968	528	—
1975	544	+0.43%
1982	608	+1.60%
1990	625	+0.35%
1999	766	+2.29%
2007	952	+2.75%
2012	1,241	+5.45%
2017	1,311	+1.10%
2023	1,238	−0.95%
Source: INSEE

== See also ==
- Communes of the Loire department
