= Marols, Loire =

Marols
- Commune
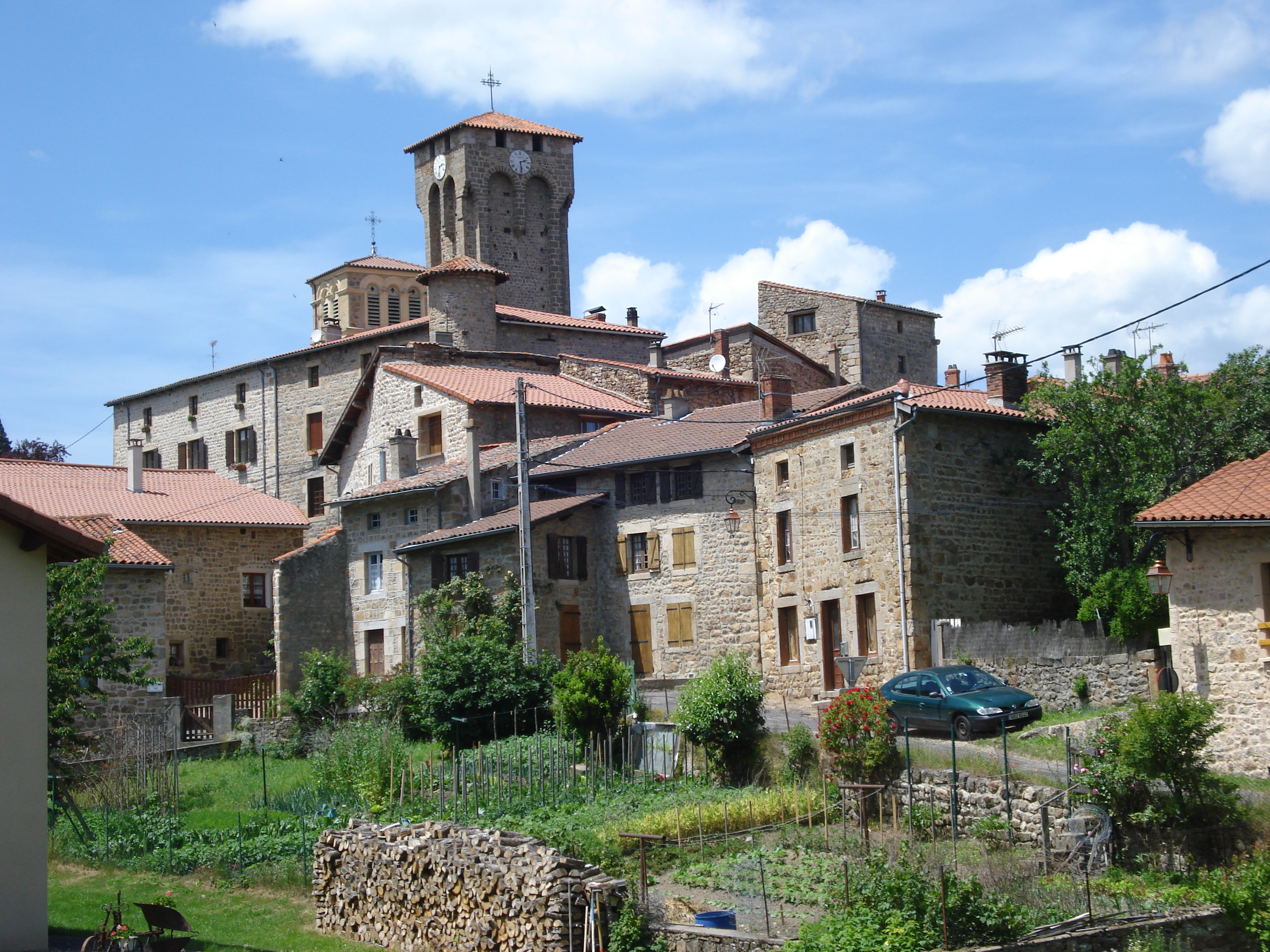

- Coat of arms
- Location of Marols
- Location within France Location within Auvergne-Rhône-Alpes
- Coordinates: 45°28′45″N 4°02′45″E
- Country: France
- Region: Auvergne-Rhône-Alpes
- Department: Loire
- Arrondissement: Montbrison
- Canton: Montbrison
- Intercommunality: CA Loire Forez

Government
  - Mayor (2020–2026): Daniel Dubost
- Area^{1}: 14.94 km^{2} (5.77 sq mi)
- Elevation: 820 m (2,690 ft)
- Highest elevation: 1,184 m (3,885 ft)
- Lowest elevation: 620 m (2,030 ft)
- Population (2023): 462
  - Density: 30.9/km^{2} (80.1/sq mi)
- Time zone: UTC+01:00 (CET)
  - Summer (DST): UTC+02:00 (CEST)
- INSEE/Postal code: 42140 /42560
- ^{1} French Land Register data, which excludes lakes, ponds, glaciers > 1 km^{2} (0.386 sq mi or 247 acres) and river estuaries.

Marols (French pronunciation: [maʁɔl]) is a commune in the Loire department in central France.

== Population ==
Historical population
Year	Pop.	±% p.a.
1968	344	—
1975	295	−2.17%
1982	285	−0.49%
1990	310	+1.06%
1999	331	+0.73%
2007	363	+1.16%
2012	420	+2.96%
2017	416	−0.19%
2023	462	+1.76%
Source: INSEE

== See also ==
- Communes of the Loire department
