= Lavieu =

Lavieu Lavi (Arpitan)
- Commune
- Coat of arms
- Location of Lavieu
- Location within France Location within Auvergne-Rhône-Alpes
- Coordinates: 45°32′24″N 4°02′08″E
- Country: France
- Region: Auvergne-Rhône-Alpes
- Department: Loire
- Arrondissement: Montbrison
- Canton: Montbrison
- Intercommunality: CA Loire Forez

Government
  - Mayor (2020–2026): Bernard Tranchant
- Area^{1}: 4.45 km^{2} (1.72 sq mi)
- Elevation: 720 m (2,360 ft)
- Highest elevation: 771 m (2,530 ft)
- Lowest elevation: 496 m (1,627 ft)
- Population (2023): 117
  - Density: 26.3/km^{2} (68.1/sq mi)
- Time zone: UTC+01:00 (CET)
  - Summer (DST): UTC+02:00 (CEST)
- INSEE/Postal code: 42117 /42560
- ^{1} French Land Register data, which excludes lakes, ponds, glaciers > 1 km^{2} (0.386 sq mi or 247 acres) and river estuaries.

Lavieu (French pronunciation: [lavjø]; Arpitan: Lavi [lɒ.ˈvi]) is a commune in the Loire department in central France.

== Population ==
Historical population
Year	Pop.	±% p.a.
1968	92	—
1975	79	−2.15%
1982	71	−1.51%
1990	56	−2.92%
1999	77	+3.60%
2007	92	+2.25%
2012	101	+1.88%
2017	116	+2.81%
2023	117	+0.14%
Source: INSEE

== See also ==
- Communes of the Loire department
