= Canton of Saint-Bonnet-le-Château =

Coordinates: 45.3986°N 4.0603°E

Saint-Bonnet-le-Château
- Former canton
- Interactive map of Saint-Bonnet-le-Château
- Country: France
- Region: Auvergne-Rhône-Alpes
- Department: Loire
- No. of communes: {{{nbcomm}}}
- Disbanded: 2015
- Area: 197.71 km^{2} (76.34 sq mi)
- Population (2012): 8,602
  - Density: 43.51/km^{2} (112.7/sq mi)

The canton of Saint-Bonnet-le-Château is a French former administrative division located in the department of Loire and the Rhone-Alpes region. It was disbanded following the French canton reorganisation which came into effect in March 2015. It consisted of 11 communes, which joined the canton of Saint-Just-Saint-Rambert in 2015. It had 8,602 inhabitants (2012).

The canton comprised the following communes:

- Aboën
- Apinac
- Estivareilles
- Merle-Leignec
- Rozier-Côtes-d'Aurec
- Saint-Bonnet-le-Château
- Saint-Hilaire-Cusson-la-Valmitte
- Saint-Maurice-en-Gourgois
- Saint-Nizier-de-Fornas
- La Tourette
- Usson-en-Forez

== See also ==
- Cantons of the Loire department
