= Apinac =

- Commune
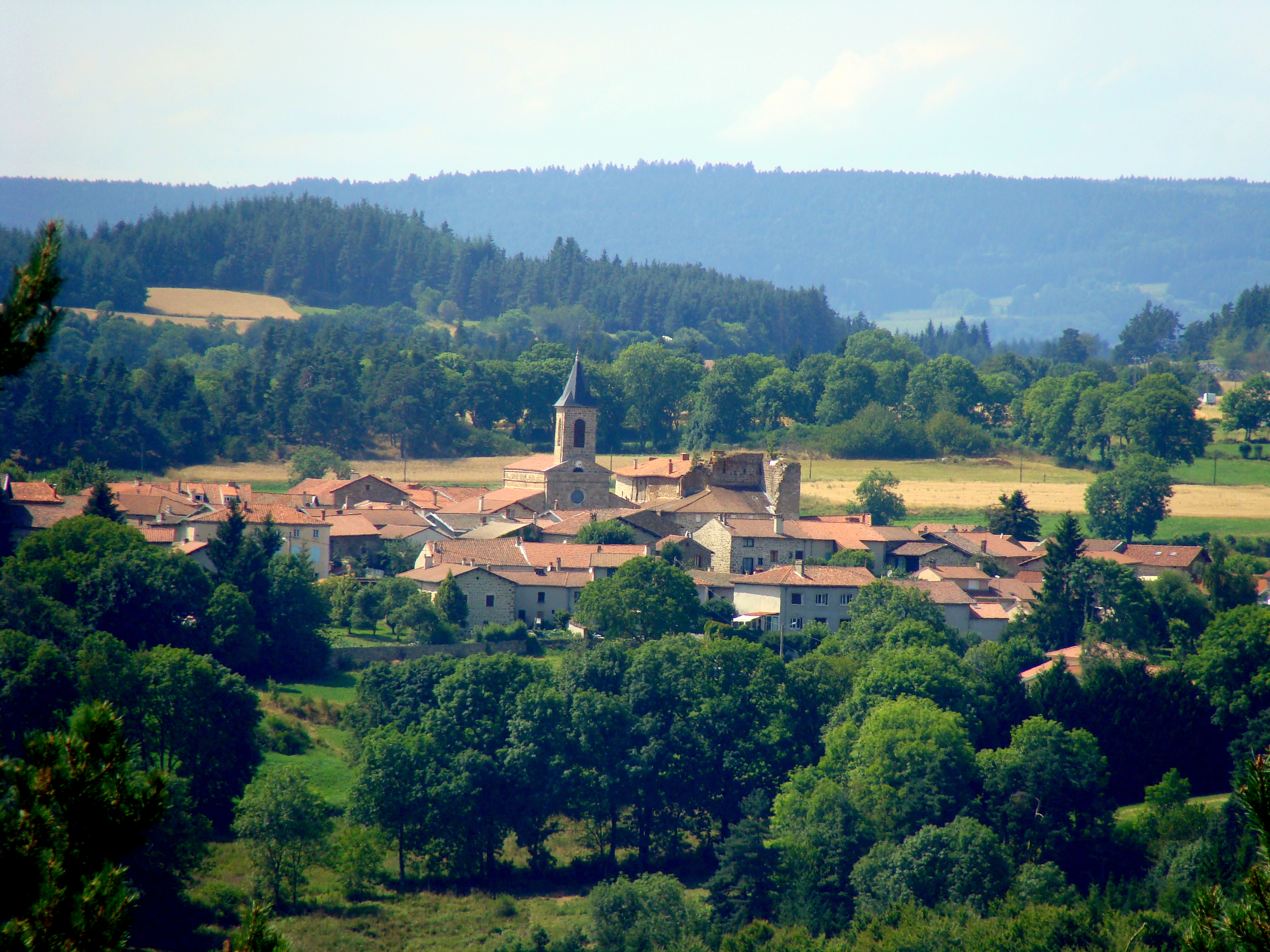

- Coat of arms
- Location of Apinac
- Location within France Location within Auvergne-Rhône-Alpes
- Coordinates: 45°22′54″N 3°59′49″E
- Country: France
- Region: Auvergne-Rhône-Alpes
- Department: Loire
- Arrondissement: Montbrison
- Canton: Saint-Just-Saint-Rambert
- Intercommunality: CA Loire Forez

Government
  - Mayor (2020–2026): Simone Christin-Lafond
- Area^{1}: 15.35 km^{2} (5.93 sq mi)
- Elevation: 940 m (3,080 ft)
- Highest elevation: 1,055 m (3,461 ft)
- Lowest elevation: 796 m (2,612 ft)
- Population (2023): 437
  - Density: 28.5/km^{2} (73.7/sq mi)
- Time zone: UTC+01:00 (CET)
  - Summer (DST): UTC+02:00 (CEST)
- INSEE/Postal code: 42006 /42550
- ^{1} French Land Register data, which excludes lakes, ponds, glaciers > 1 km^{2} (0.386 sq mi or 247 acres) and river estuaries.

Apinac (French pronunciation: [apinak]) is a village and commune in the Loire department in central France. Apinac is in the extreme southwest of the Loire department, 41.7 kilometres (25.9 mi) southwest of Saint-Étienne.

With a total area of 15.4 km^{2} and a total population of 437 inhabitants (in 2023), the population density is 29 inhabitants per km^{2}.

The church, dated to the 19th century, is noted for its colorful stained glass windows. Vivaro-Alpine, is the local dialect, which is also spoken in Ardèche or the Southern Alps.

== History ==
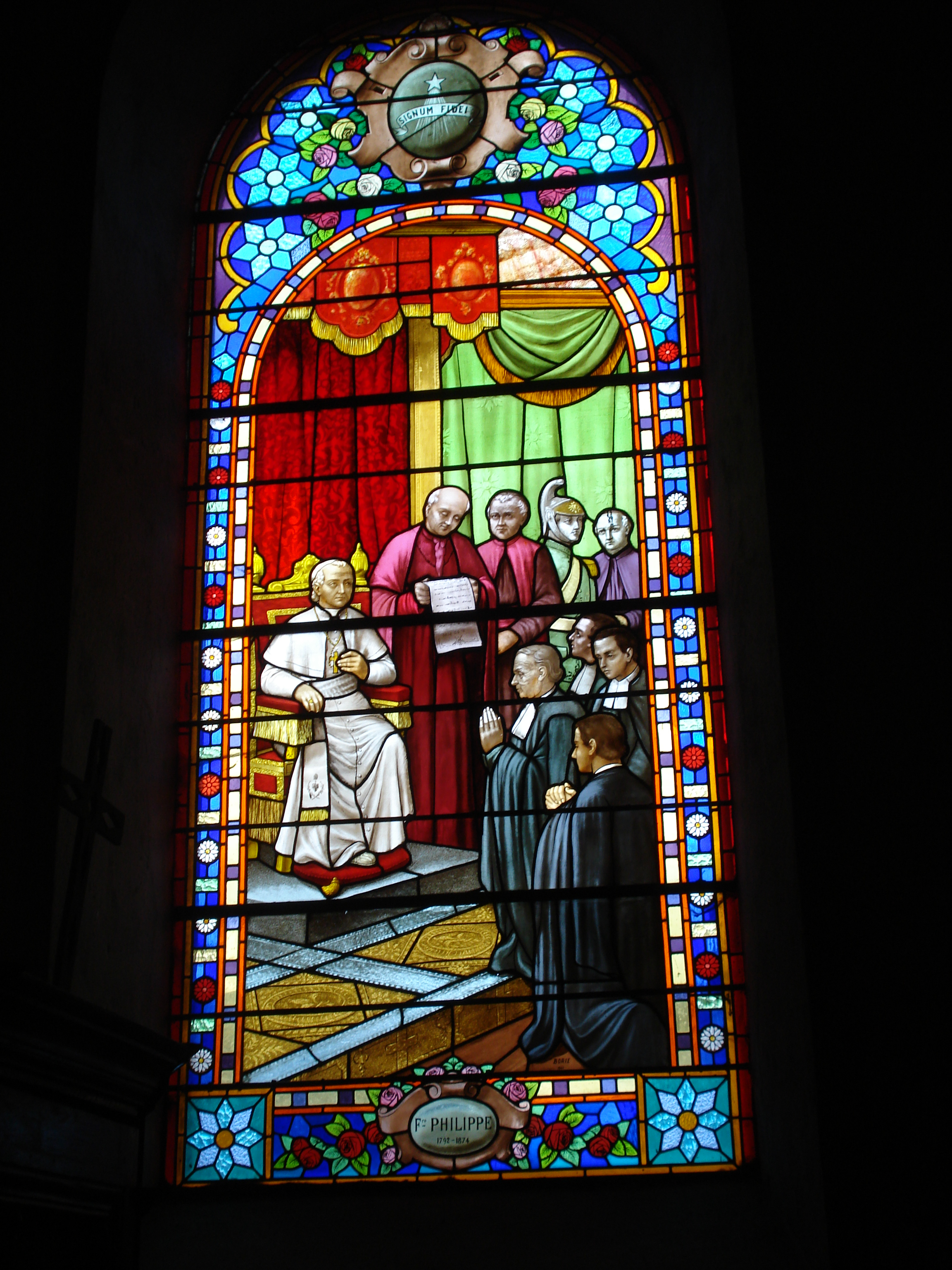
Stained glass window of Apinac church

According to the mayor of Estivareilles, in 1839, the residents of four hamlets in the commune of Apinac voted to become part of Estivareilles rather than Apinac, their reasoning being that not only had they always buried their dead in Estivareilles rather than Apinac but "since time immemorial", they had been spiritually connected with Estivareilles rather than Apinac. In 1881, it had a population of 1,120 people. In 1982, Apinac had a population of 355, with 406 reported in 2019. The principal church dates to the 19th century and is noted for its vibrant stained glass windows. Catholic worship was sanctioned to be held at the Apinac church by the Catholic Church of France.

== Geography ==
Apinac is located in the extreme south-west of the Loire department, 41.7 kilometres (25.9 mi) southwest of Saint-Étienne, 5.6 kilometres (3.5 mi) southeast of Usson-en-Forez, 5.4 kilometres (3.4 mi) south of Estivareilles, and 6.1 kilometres (3.8 mi) by road to the northwest of Saint-Hilaire-Cusson-la-Valmitte. It belongs to the Canton of Saint-Just-Saint-Rambert. The altitude of the commune varies between 796–1,055 metres (2,612–3,461 ft), with 940 metres (3,080 ft) cited in the centre of the main village. The hamlets of Jossy, Combreau, Fontry, and Le Breuil are near the village of Apinac.

== Climate ==
The climate in Apinac is temperate. Rainfall is recorded all through the year and the average annual rainfall is 787 millimetres (31.0 in). The lowest average monthly rainfall is recorded during the driest month of February while the maximum average monthly rainfall is 92 millimetres (3.6 in), reported in June. The average monthly temperatures vary from a maximum of 16.2 °C (61.2 °F) in July to a minimum of −2 °C (28 °F) in January. The average annual temperature is however 7.8 °C (46.0 °F).

Climate data for Apinac (Average monthly temperature)
Month	Jan	Feb	Mar	Apr	May	Jun	Jul	Aug	Sep	Oct	Nov	Dec	Year
Mean daily maximum °C (°F)	3.2 (37.8)	4.4 (39.9)	8.4 (47.1)	11.4 (52.5)	15.4 (59.7)	19.8 (67.6)	22 (72)	21.7 (71.1)	18.5 (65.3)	13 (55)	7.4 (45.3)	3.8 (38.8)	22 (72)
Mean daily minimum °C (°F)	−3.5 (25.7)	−3.2 (26.2)	−8.7 (16.3)	1.6 (34.9)	5.1 (41.2)	4.2 (39.6)	18.5 (65.3)	18.2 (64.8)	8.2 (46.8)	4.2 (39.6)	8.8 (47.8)	−2.1 (28.2)	−8.7 (16.3)

== Demographics ==
In 2020, Apinac had a population of 397 people, in 197 households. There were 343 houses, of which 197 were the main residence, 129 were second homes, and 18 were not occupied. 321 were houses and 19 were flats. Of 197 main residences, 157 were occupied by their owners, 31 were leased and occupied by tenants, and 9 were given gratuitously.

Historical population
Year	Pop.	±% p.a.
1968	416	—
1975	393	−0.81%
1982	354	−1.48%
1990	330	−0.87%
1999	304	−0.91%
2007	370	+2.49%
2012	418	+2.47%
2017	416	−0.10%
2023	437	+0.82%
Source: INSEE

== Economy ==
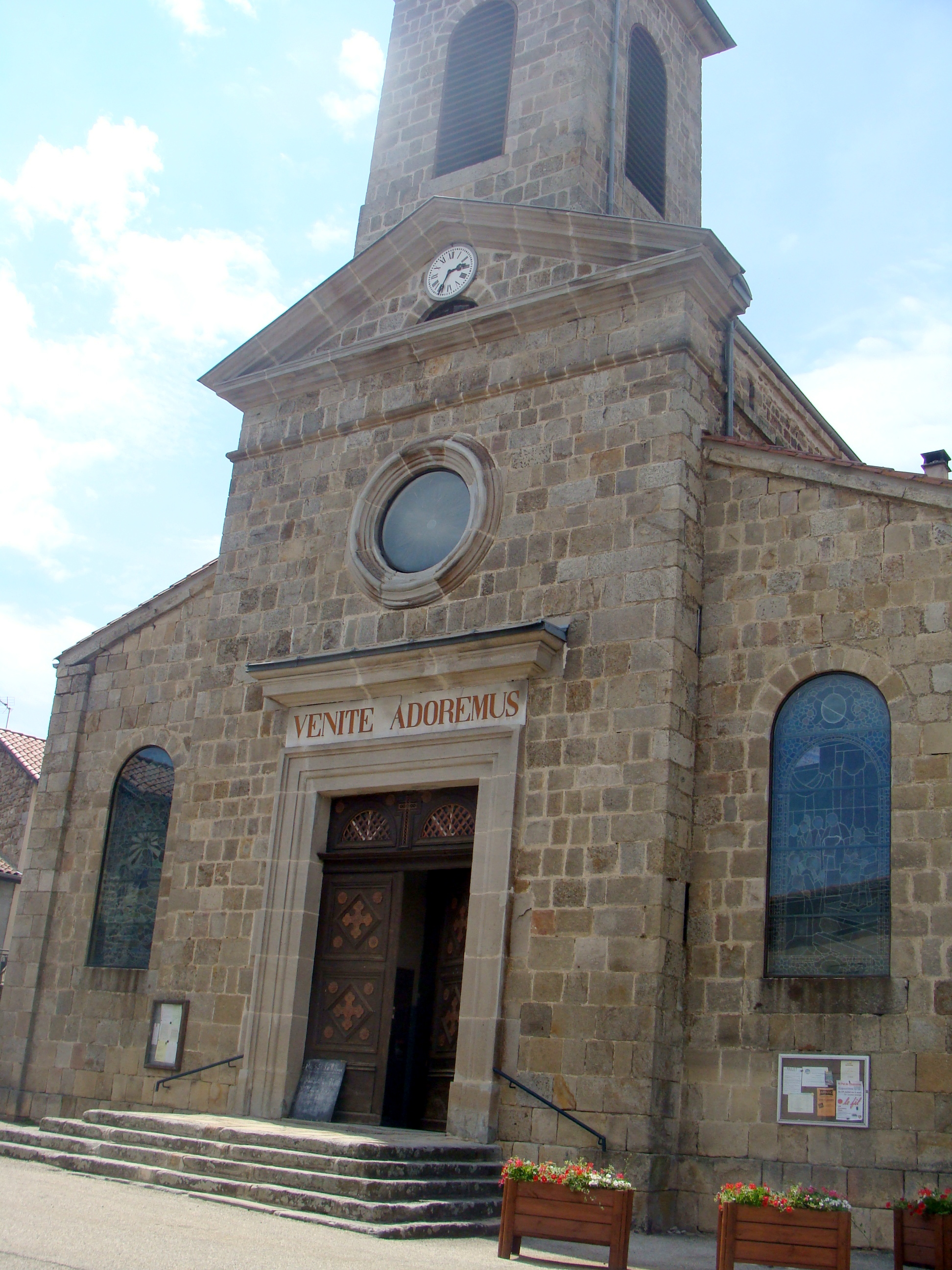
Apinac Church

In 2007, the population of working age consisted of 222 people; 151 were active and 71 were inactive. Of the 151 active, 141 were occupied (81 men and 60 women) and 10 were unemployed. Of the 71 inactive, 34 were retired, 15 were students, and 22 were classified as "other inactive". In 2009, the median annual income tax was €16,310 per person.

Of the 13 establishments that were in Apinac in 2007, there was one food company, six construction companies, three trade companies, one transport company, one real estate company, and one service company. As of 2009, it had three shops, including a bakery. In 2000, there were 25 farms in the commune of Apinac, occupying a total of 558 hectares (1,380 acres).

== Attractions ==
A heritage building dated to 1893 is near the village. The isolated house on the highland at an elevation of 1,000 metres (3,300 ft) has been refurbished.

== Notable people ==
- Philippe Bransiet (1792-1874), Superior General of the Christian Brothers.

== See also ==
- Communes of the Loire department
