= Chambles =

- Commune
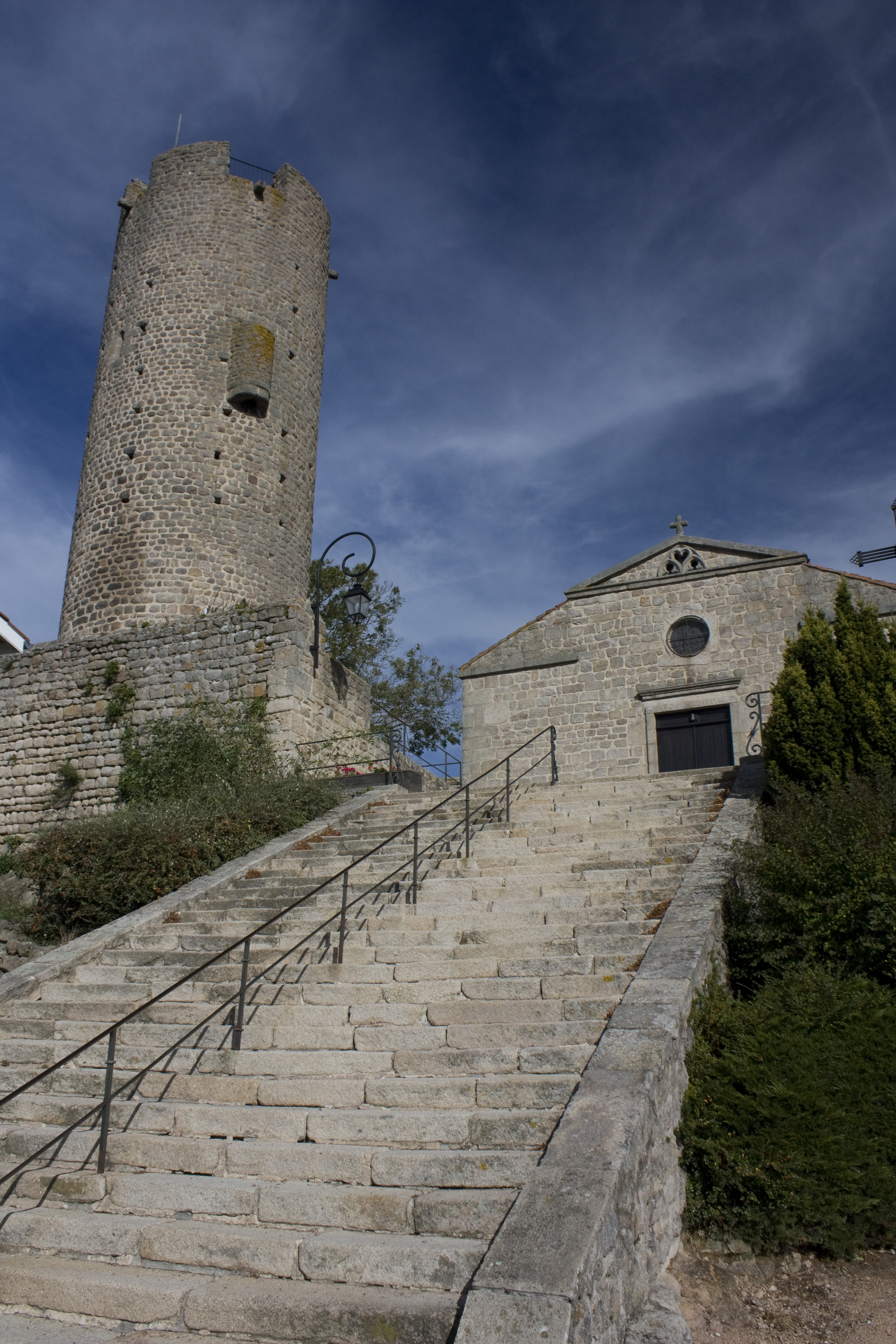
- Tower and staircase

- Coat of arms
- Location of Chambles
- Location within France Location within Auvergne-Rhône-Alpes
- Coordinates: 45°26′34″N 4°14′20″E
- Country: France
- Region: Auvergne-Rhône-Alpes
- Department: Loire
- Arrondissement: Montbrison
- Canton: Saint-Just-Saint-Rambert
- Intercommunality: CA Loire Forez

Government
  - Mayor (2020–2026): Pierre Giraud
- Area^{1}: 18.9 km^{2} (7.3 sq mi)
- Elevation: 640 m (2,100 ft)
- Highest elevation: 741 m (2,431 ft)
- Lowest elevation: 360 m (1,180 ft)
- Population (2023): 1,075
  - Density: 56.9/km^{2} (147/sq mi)
- Time zone: UTC+01:00 (CET)
  - Summer (DST): UTC+02:00 (CEST)
- INSEE/Postal code: 42042 /42170
- ^{1} French Land Register data, which excludes lakes, ponds, glaciers > 1 km^{2} (0.386 sq mi or 247 acres) and river estuaries.

Chambles (French pronunciation: [ʃɑ̃bl]) is a commune in the Loire department in central France. The commune has an area of 18.90 km^{2} and its altitude ranges from 360 to 741 meters. As of 2019, there were 522 dwellings in Chambles, of which 420 main residences.

== Population ==
Historical population

Year	Pop.	±% p.a.
1793	700	—
1821	715	+0.08%
1846	897	+0.91%
1872	685	−1.03%
1901	580	−0.57%
1926	465	−0.88%
1946	290	−2.33%
1962	288	−0.04%
1968	295	+0.40%

Year	Pop.	±% p.a.
1975	356	+2.72%
1982	545	+6.27%
1990	624	+1.71%
1999	762	+2.24%
2007	914	+2.30%
2012	967	+1.13%
2017	1,000	+0.67%
2023	1,075	+1.21%

Source: EHESS and INSEE (1968-2023)

== See also ==
- Communes of the Loire department
