= Saint-Cyprien, Loire =

Saint-Cyprien
- Commune
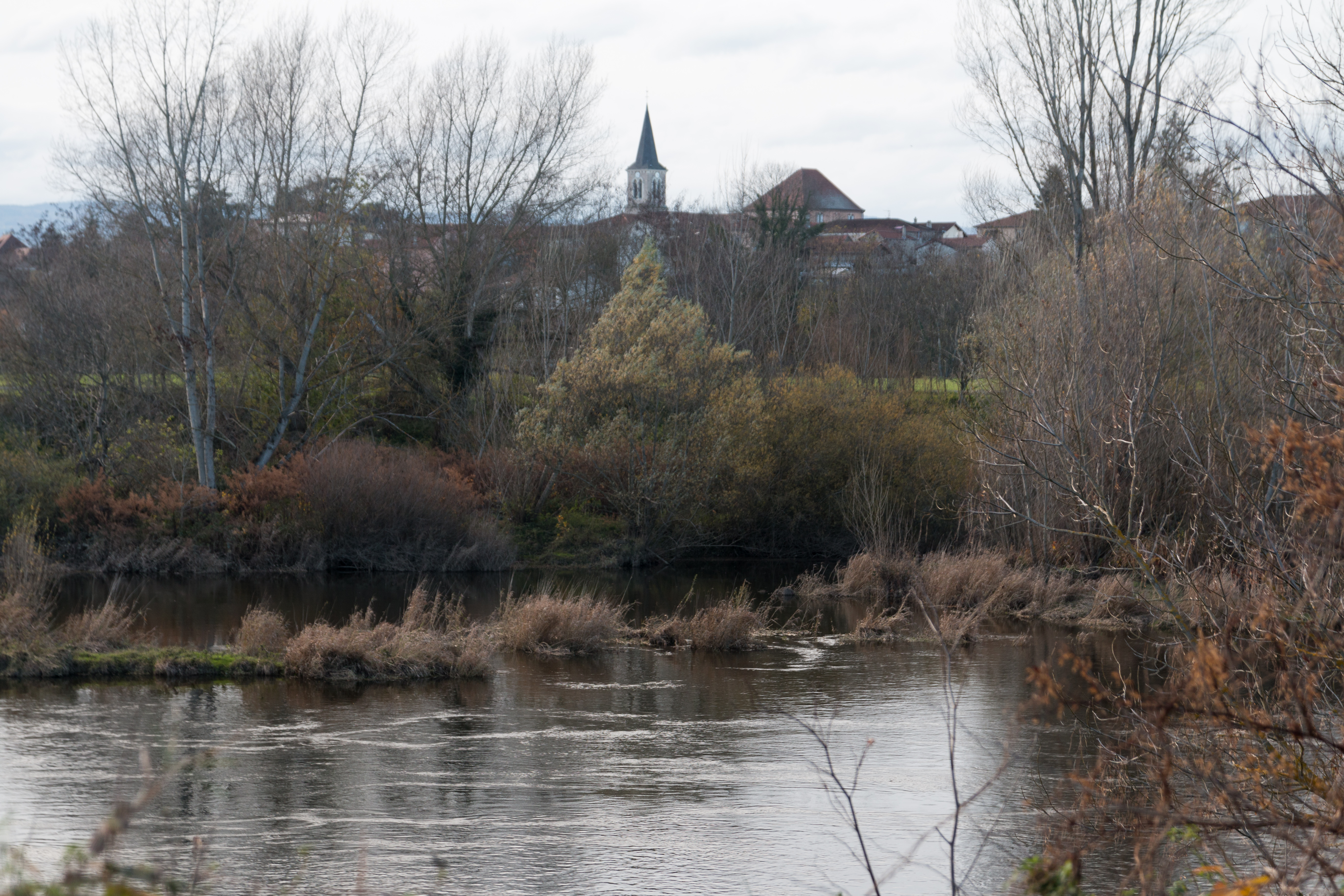

- Coat of arms
- Location of Saint-Cyprien
- Location within France Location within Auvergne-Rhône-Alpes
- Coordinates: 45°32′20″N 4°14′14″E
- Country: France
- Region: Auvergne-Rhône-Alpes
- Department: Loire
- Arrondissement: Montbrison
- Canton: Saint-Just-Saint-Rambert
- Intercommunality: CA Loire Forez

Government
  - Mayor (2020–2026): Marc Archer
- Area^{1}: 7.28 km^{2} (2.81 sq mi)
- Elevation: 378 m (1,240 ft)
- Highest elevation: 380 m (1,250 ft)
- Lowest elevation: 354 m (1,161 ft)
- Population (2023): 2,415
  - Density: 332/km^{2} (859/sq mi)
- Time zone: UTC+01:00 (CET)
  - Summer (DST): UTC+02:00 (CEST)
- INSEE/Postal code: 42211 /42160
- ^{1} French Land Register data, which excludes lakes, ponds, glaciers > 1 km^{2} (0.386 sq mi or 247 acres) and river estuaries.

Saint-Cyprien (French pronunciation: [sɛ̃ sipʁijɛ̃]; Arpitan: Sant-Cebrin) is a commune in the Loire department in central France.

== Population ==
Historical population

Year	Pop.	±% p.a.
1793	480	—
1821	748	+1.60%
1846	428	−2.21%
1872	420	−0.07%
1901	505	+0.64%
1926	482	−0.19%
1946	496	+0.14%
1962	641	+1.62%
1968	690	+1.24%

Year	Pop.	±% p.a.
1975	1,321	+9.72%
1982	1,584	+2.63%
1990	2,005	+2.99%
1999	2,125	+0.65%
2007	2,352	+1.28%
2012	2,328	−0.20%
2017	2,485	+1.31%
2023	2,415	−0.48%

Source: EHESS and INSEE (1968–2023)

== See also ==
- Communes of the Loire department
