= Bonson, Loire =

Bonson
- Commune
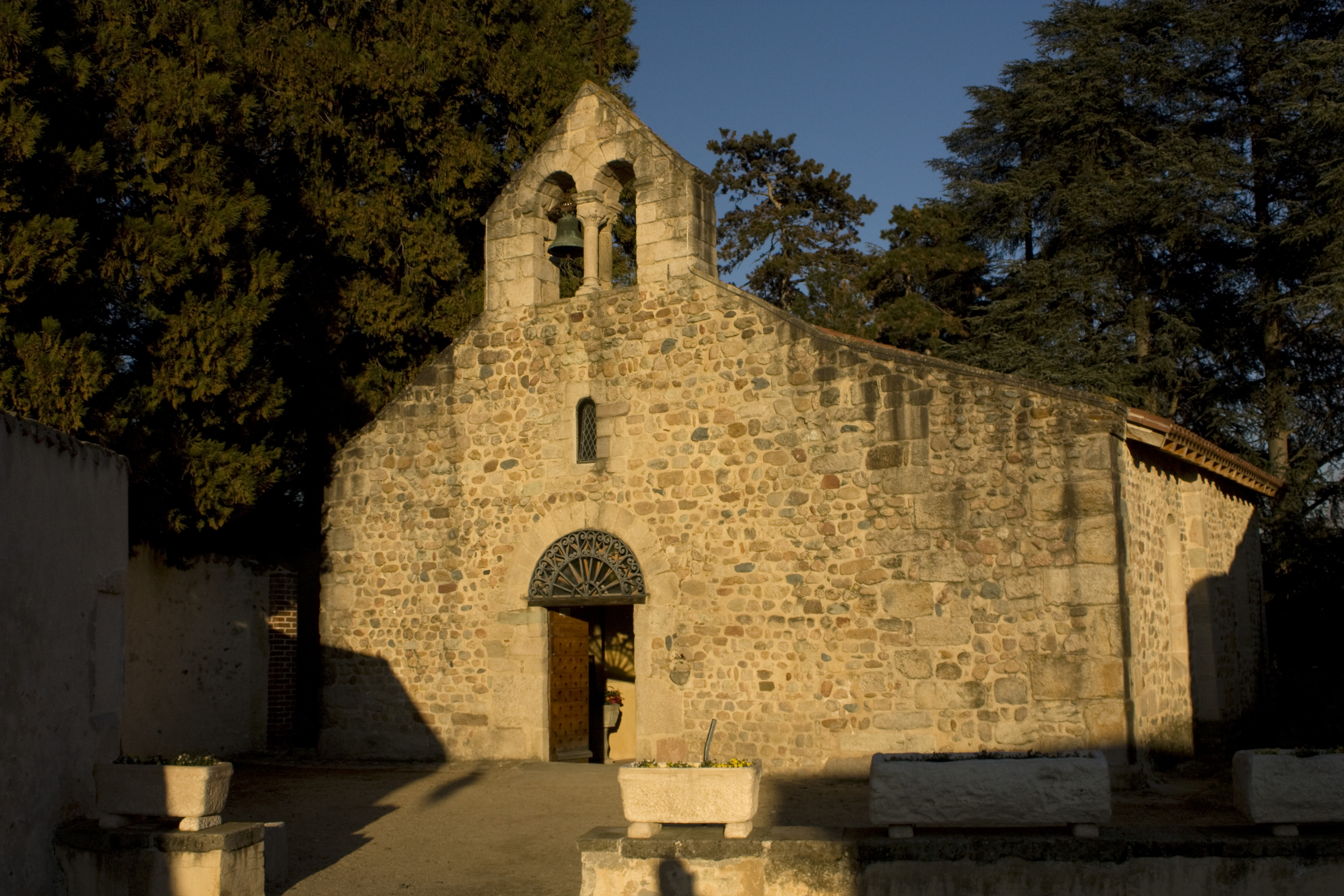
- Location of Bonson
- Location within France Location within Auvergne-Rhône-Alpes
- Coordinates: 45°31′27″N 4°13′00″E
- Country: France
- Region: Auvergne-Rhône-Alpes
- Department: Loire
- Arrondissement: Montbrison
- Canton: Saint-Just-Saint-Rambert
- Intercommunality: CA Loire Forez

Government
  - Mayor (2021–2026): Thierry Deville
- Area^{1}: 5.15 km^{2} (1.99 sq mi)
- Elevation: 380 m (1,250 ft)
- Highest elevation: 385 m (1,263 ft)
- Lowest elevation: 355 m (1,165 ft)
- Population (2023): 4,557
  - Density: 885/km^{2} (2,290/sq mi)
- Time zone: UTC+01:00 (CET)
  - Summer (DST): UTC+02:00 (CEST)
- INSEE/Postal code: 42022 /42160
- ^{1} French Land Register data, which excludes lakes, ponds, glaciers > 1 km^{2} (0.386 sq mi or 247 acres) and river estuaries.

Bonson (French pronunciation: [bɔ̃sɔ̃]) is a commune in the Loire department in central France.

== Population ==
Historical population
Year	Pop.	±% p.a.
1968	1,096	—
1975	1,513	+4.71%
1982	2,566	+7.84%
1990	3,880	+5.30%
1999	3,816	−0.18%
2007	3,695	−0.40%
2012	3,674	−0.11%
2017	3,889	+1.14%
2023	4,557	+2.68%
Source: INSEE

== Personalities ==
The church, the train station, as well as all the sports fields and all the surrounding houses were built thanks to the donation of land by Sylvain Girerd, at the time owner of the Noyers property, rue Sylvain Girerd.

== See also ==
- Communes of the Loire department
