= Périgneux =

- Commune
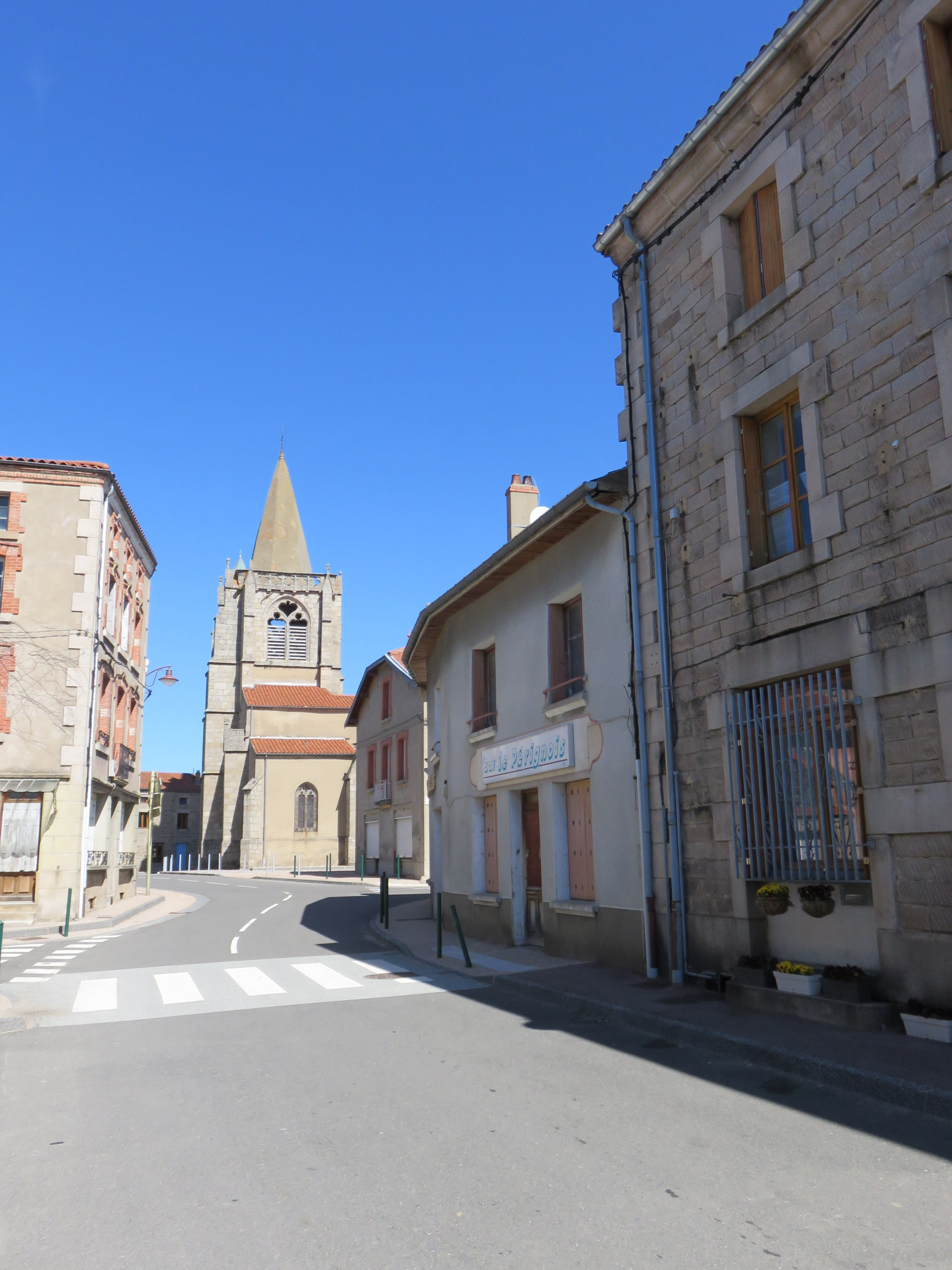

- Coat of arms
- Location of Périgneux
- Location within France Location within Auvergne-Rhône-Alpes
- Coordinates: 45°26′35″N 4°09′20″E
- Country: France
- Region: Auvergne-Rhône-Alpes
- Department: Loire
- Arrondissement: Montbrison
- Canton: Saint-Just-Saint-Rambert
- Intercommunality: CA Loire Forez

Government
  - Mayor (2020–2026): Michel Robin
- Area^{1}: 32 km^{2} (12 sq mi)
- Elevation: 640 m (2,100 ft)
- Highest elevation: 720 m (2,360 ft)
- Lowest elevation: 448 m (1,470 ft)
- Population (2023): 1,621
  - Density: 51/km^{2} (130/sq mi)
- Time zone: UTC+01:00 (CET)
  - Summer (DST): UTC+02:00 (CEST)
- INSEE/Postal code: 42169 /42380
- ^{1} French Land Register data, which excludes lakes, ponds, glaciers > 1 km^{2} (0.386 sq mi or 247 acres) and river estuaries.

Périgneux (French pronunciation: [peʁiɲø]) is a commune in the Loire department in central France.

== Population ==
Historical population
Year	Pop.	±% p.a.
1968	812	—
1975	743	−1.26%
1982	765	+0.42%
1990	896	+2.00%
1999	1,083	+2.13%
2007	1,264	+1.95%
2012	1,410	+2.21%
2017	1,512	+1.41%
2023	1,621	+1.17%
Source: INSEE

== See also ==
- Communes of the Loire department
