= Jean-Claude Faveyrial =

French historian, writer and priest

The Reverend Jean-Claude Faveyrial CM
- Born: 25 March 1817; Usson-en-Forez, Loire, France
- Died: 26 November 1893 (aged 76); Bitola (Monastir), Ottoman Empire (present-day North Macedonia)
- Occupations: French and philosophy professor, historian

Jean-Claude Faveyrial, CM (1817–1893) was a French Lazarite Roman Catholic priest and author of the first written History of Albania. The book is published in Albania and stands as a serious endeavour to document the history of the Albanians and their country since Antiquity. A long-time teacher in Bitola, he was also deeply involved with the Bulgarian movement for independence and was a friend of the Aromanian people, whose schooling he extensively helped during his lifetime.

== Biography ==
Faveyrial was born on 25 March 1817 in the village of Usson-en-Forez, located west of Saint-Étienne in the south French province of Auvergne. Prior to joining the Congregation of the Mission in Paris in 1843, he studied in Lyon. Faveyrial moved to the order's Istanbul branch in 1847, two years after he was ordained a priest by the Lazarites.

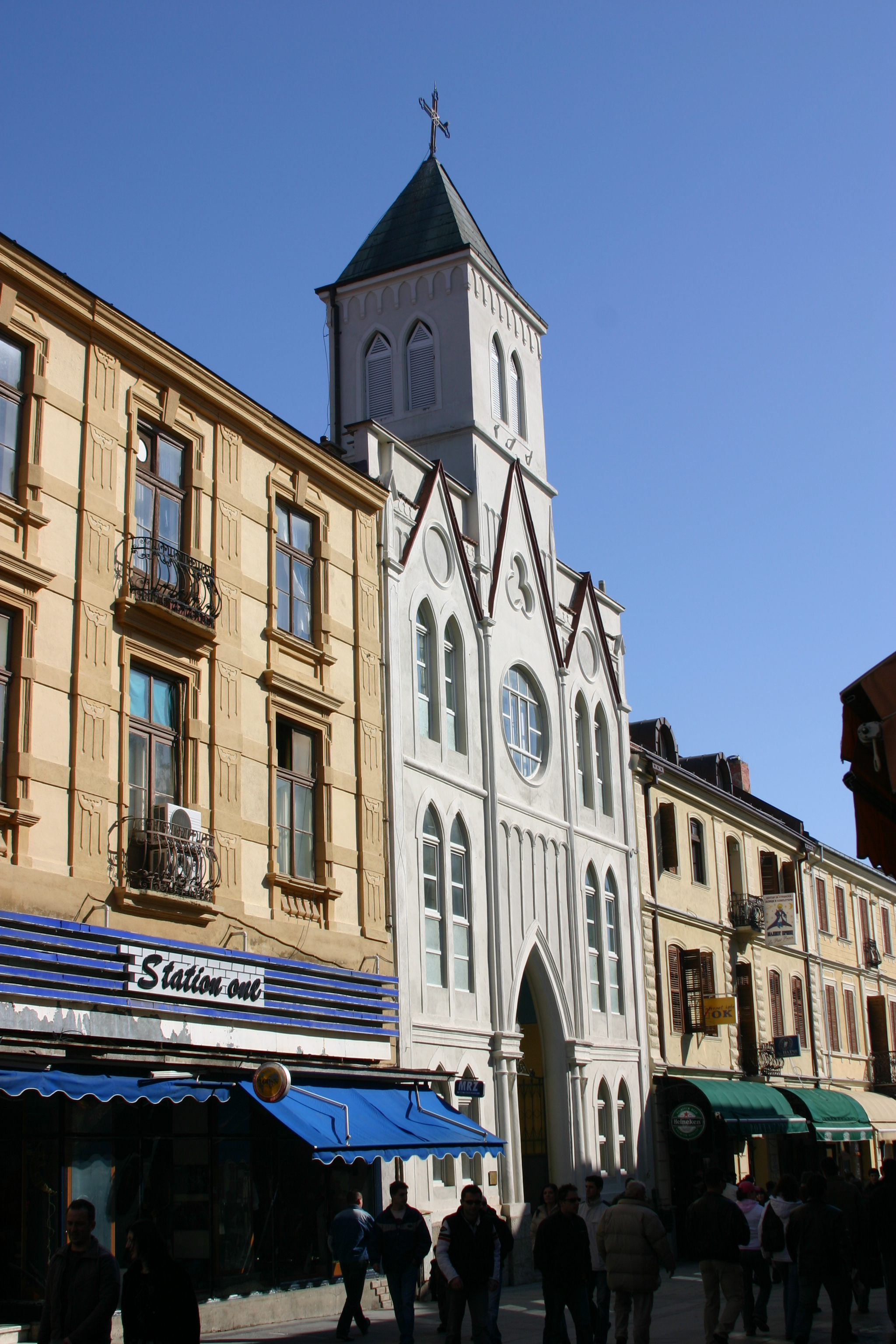
The Roman Catholic Church, "Holy Heart of Jesus", was Faveyrial's long-time residence in Bitola, the city where he served as an abbot and teacher

Faveyrial was strongly supportive of the Bulgarian struggle for independence, and renowned as being among the souls of that movement. From 1867 until his death, 26 years later, he served as a professor at the Romanian High School of Bitola (Monastir), a city in west Macedonia, where he taught French and philosophy. For a year before that, he had served as a priest in Thessaloniki. In Bitola, Favyerial combined his work as a teacher with his religious duties for the Lazarite order as a local abbot.

It was in Istanbul that, between 1858 and 1867, Faveyrial started a collection of books with the purpose of building a library that would help write the history of the Albanians, the Bulgarians, and the Aromanians. His scrutiny of the history of these peoples, he thought, would assist them to prepare for their future. Faveyrial visited the Albanian lands in 1884, and along with Apostol Mărgărit, the general inspector of the Romanian schools of the Ottoman Empire, he founded Romanian-financed schools for the Aromanian population in Berat, Korça, Prizren, and other settlements.

Faveyrial was an acquaintance of folklorist Konstantin Miladinov and public figure Dragan Tsankov. He even served as de facto editor-in-chief of Tsankov's Istanbul-based newspaper Balgaria for several years. Despite their ecclesiastical differences, Bulgarian patriarch Cyril remembered Faveyrial as a "kind priest".

After a life of intense work of teaching and writings, and after having opened many new schools during his last 13 years of life, Jean-Claude Faveyrial died in Manastir on 26 November 1893.

== History of Albania and other works ==
The History of Albania, written in French, was drafted between 1884 and 1889, and discovered on 20 September 1999, by Father Yves Danjou, responsible of the archives of the House of the Lazarite Missionaries in Paris. The book of 416 pages is more correctly a history of southeastern Europe, as it also details the past of other Balkan peoples. While not necessarily always factually accurate and understandably outdated in its perception, Faveyrial's work is of great historical value, partly because its inclusion of original letters by various Balkan historical figures.

During the time that Faveyrial was writing the History of Albania, Le istorie albanesi (The Albanian histories) (Salerno 1886), a work in four volumes by the Arbëreshë Francesco Tajani, was published in Italy. As Faveyrial's work was in French, the first history of Albania written in the Albanian language is considered to be T'nnollunat e Sccypniis prei gni Gheghet ci don vênnin e vet (English: The events in Albania from a gheg who loves his country) (Alexandria 1898) by Stefë Zurani (1865–1941).

Faveyrial is also known for several works in the Bulgarian language, all of which now considered particularly rare, such as the Manual of Politeness (Istanbul 1858), French–Bulgarian Dialogues (Istanbul 1859), and Great Catechism for the Use of the Uniate Bulgarians (Istanbul 1862). Faveyrial also authored books and articles focused on Balkan history and the Catholic faith, as well as a description of Bitola. However, some of these were lost as the Bitola Lazarite building was torched in 1909.

== External links and further reading ==
- Histoire d'Albanie by Jean-Claude Faveyrial (in French)
- Faveyrial, Jean-Claude (2004), Historia e Shqipërisë: (më e vjetër) (in Albanian), Plejad, ISBN 978-99927-982-7-0
- Faveyrial, Jean-Claude (2001), Histoire de l'Albanie (in French), Dukagjini, OCLC 49974271
- Faveyrial, Jean-Claude (2007), Catéchisme valaque: à l'usage de prêtres : (un manuscrit inedit. Monastir, Bitola 1891) (in French), Unia ti culturã-a Armãnjlor dit Machidunii, ISBN 978-9989-895-62-3
