= Saint-Bonnet-le-Château =

Saint-Bonnet-le-Château Sant Bonet dau Chastèl (Occitan)
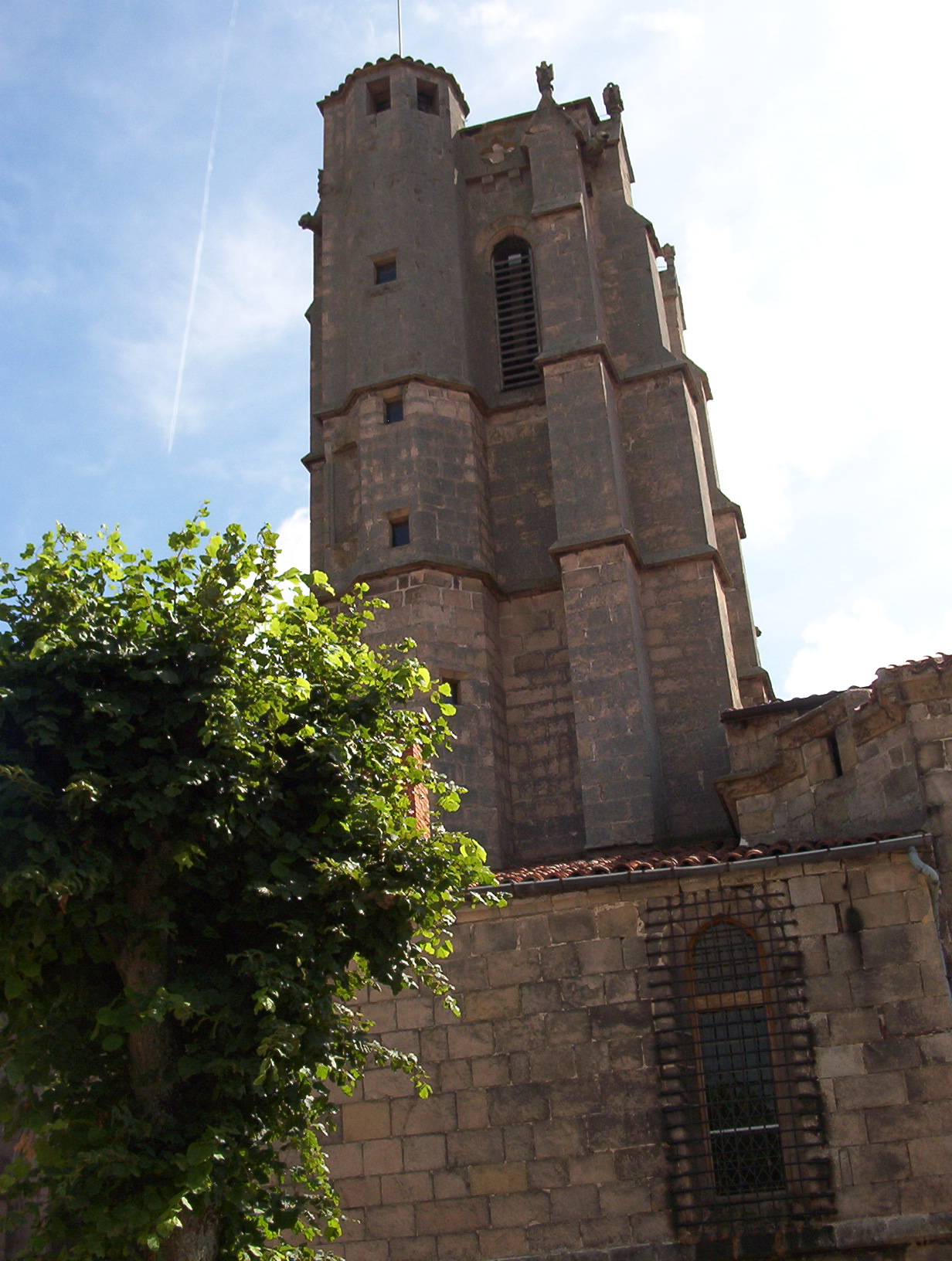
- Tower of the collegiate church of Saint-Bonnet

- Coat of arms
- Location of Saint-Bonnet-le-Château
- Location within France Location within Auvergne-Rhône-Alpes
- Coordinates: 45°25′28″N 4°04′01″E
- Country: France
- Region: Auvergne-Rhône-Alpes
- Department: Loire
- Arrondissement: Montbrison
- Canton: Saint-Just-Saint-Rambert
- Intercommunality: CA Loire Forez

Government
  - Mayor (2020–2026): Patrick Ledieu
- Area^{1}: 1.87 km^{2} (0.72 sq mi)
- Elevation: 860 m (2,820 ft)
- Highest elevation: 952 m (3,123 ft)
- Lowest elevation: 779 m (2,556 ft)
- Population (2023): 1,459
  - Density: 780/km^{2} (2,020/sq mi)
- Time zone: UTC+01:00 (CET)
  - Summer (DST): UTC+02:00 (CEST)
- INSEE/Postal code: 42204 /42380
- ^{1} French Land Register data, which excludes lakes, ponds, glaciers > 1 km^{2} (0.386 sq mi or 247 acres) and river estuaries.

Saint-Bonnet-le-Château (French: [sɛ̃ bɔnɛ l(ə) ʃɑto]; Occitan: Sant Bonet dau Chastèl) is a commune in the Loire department in central France.

== Population ==
Historical population
Year	Pop.	±% p.a.
1968	2,280	—
1975	2,243	−0.23%
1982	1,905	−2.31%
1990	1,687	−1.51%
1999	1,562	−0.85%
2007	1,479	−0.68%
2012	1,570	+1.20%
2017	1,527	−0.55%
2023	1,459	−0.76%
Source: INSEE

== International relations ==
Saint-Bonnet-le-Château is twinned with:

- Bishop's Waltham, United Kingdom

== See also ==
- Communes of the Loire department
