= Merle-Leignec =

- Commune
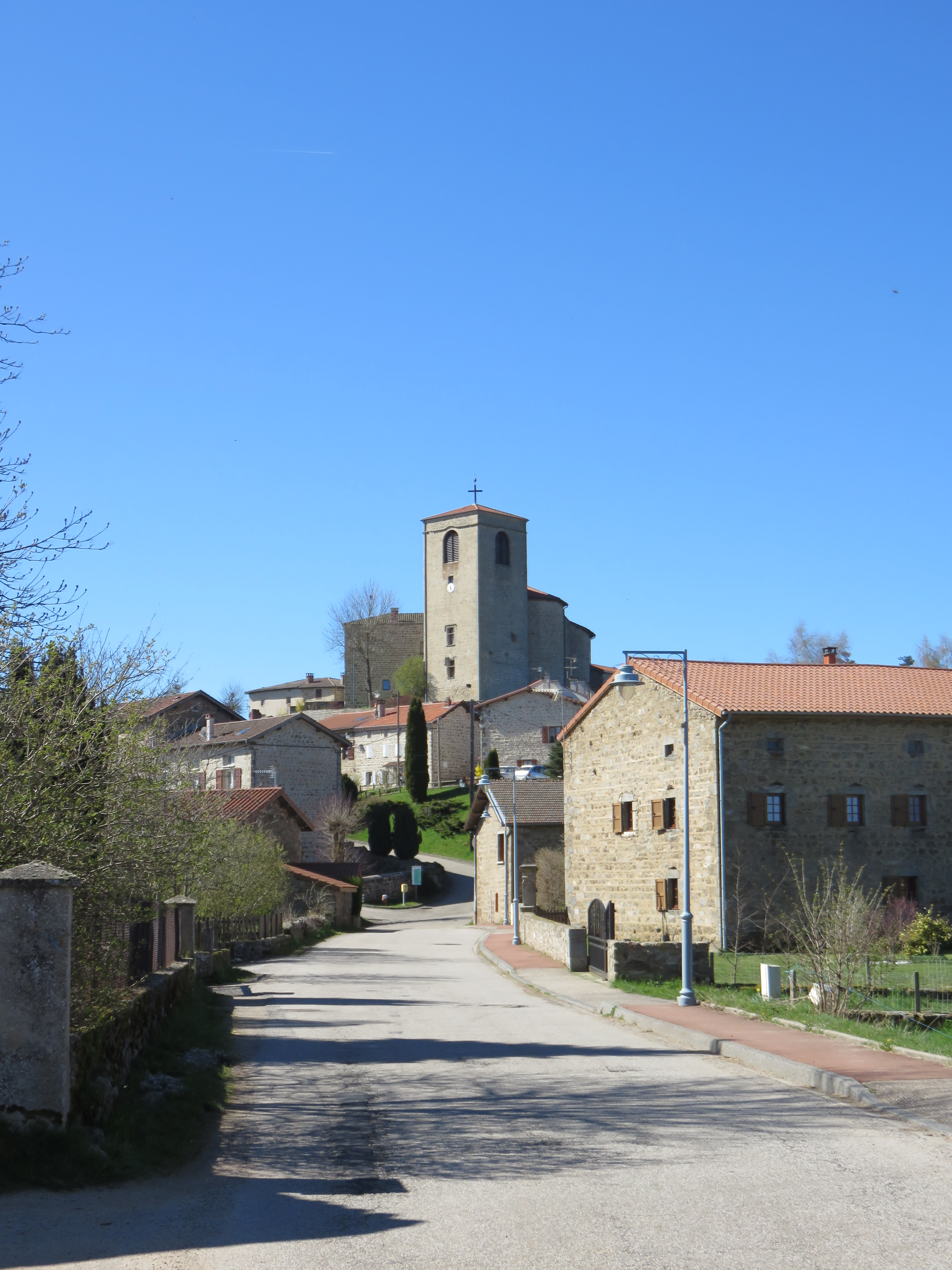

- Coat of arms
- Location of Merle-Leignec
- Location within France Location within Auvergne-Rhône-Alpes
- Coordinates: 45°22′32″N 4°01′06″E
- Country: France
- Region: Auvergne-Rhône-Alpes
- Department: Loire
- Arrondissement: Montbrison
- Canton: Saint-Just-Saint-Rambert
- Intercommunality: CA Loire Forez

Government
  - Mayor (2020–2026): René Avril
- Area^{1}: 16.17 km^{2} (6.24 sq mi)
- Elevation: 1,000 m (3,300 ft)
- Highest elevation: 994 m (3,261 ft)
- Lowest elevation: 660 m (2,170 ft)
- Population (2023): 324
  - Density: 20.0/km^{2} (51.9/sq mi)
- Time zone: UTC+01:00 (CET)
  - Summer (DST): UTC+02:00 (CEST)
- INSEE/Postal code: 42142 /42380
- ^{1} French Land Register data, which excludes lakes, ponds, glaciers > 1 km^{2} (0.386 sq mi or 247 acres) and river estuaries.

Merle-Leignec (French pronunciation: [mɛʁl lɛɲɛk], before 1993: Merle) is a commune in the Loire department in central France.

== Population ==
Historical population
Year	Pop.	±% p.a.
1968	278	—
1975	216	−3.54%
1982	223	+0.46%
1990	233	+0.55%
1999	235	+0.10%
2007	298	+3.01%
2012	307	+0.60%
2017	320	+0.83%
2023	324	+0.21%
Source: INSEE

== See also ==
- Communes of the Loire department
