= Rozier-Côtes-d'Aurec =

- Commune
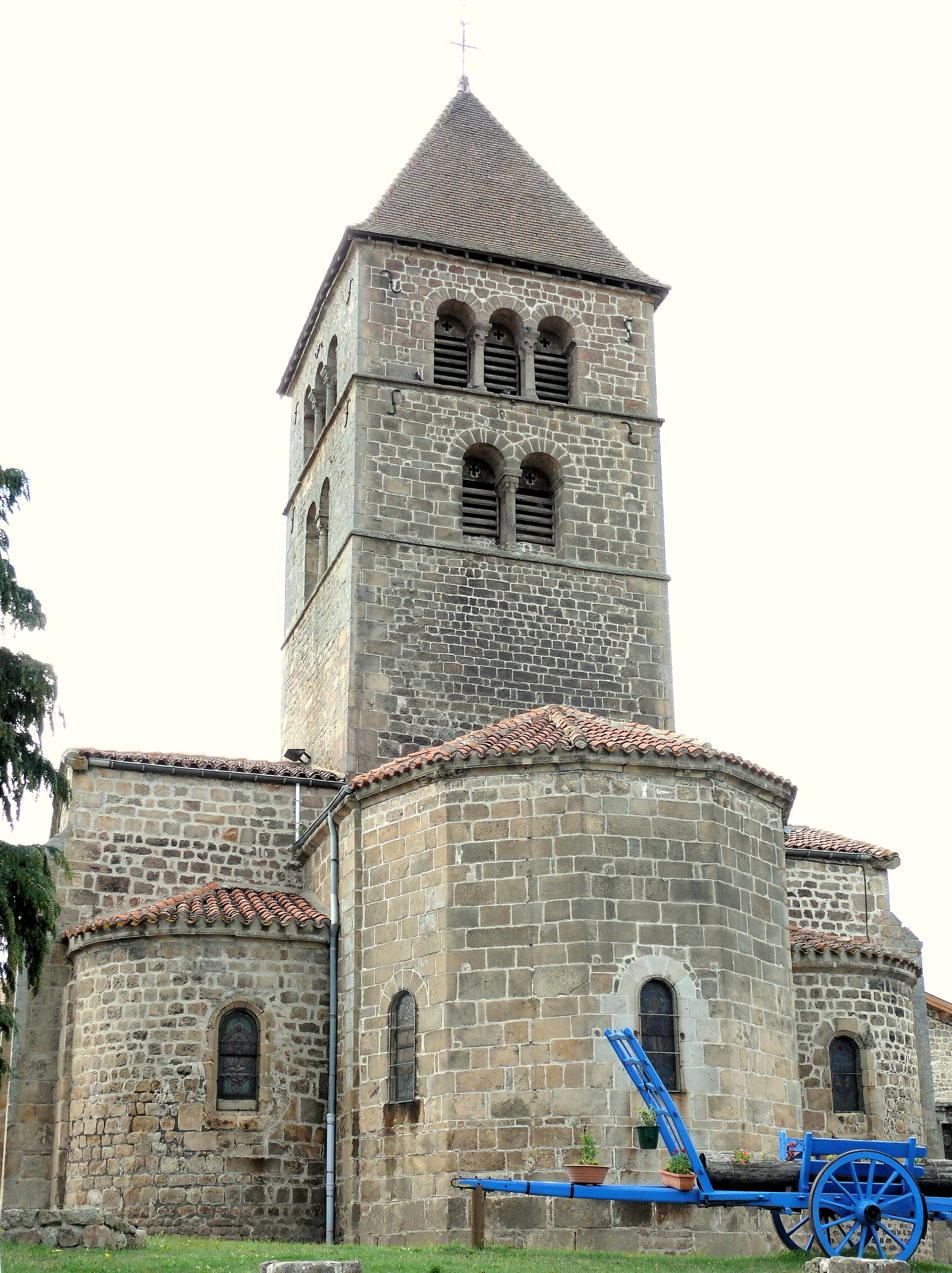
- Location of Rozier-Côtes-d'Aurec
- Location within France Location within Auvergne-Rhône-Alpes
- Coordinates: 45°22′20″N 4°06′17″E
- Country: France
- Region: Auvergne-Rhône-Alpes
- Department: Loire
- Arrondissement: Montbrison
- Canton: Saint-Just-Saint-Rambert
- Intercommunality: Saint-Étienne Métropole

Government
  - Mayor (2020–2026): Jean-Marc Sardat
- Area^{1}: 13.89 km^{2} (5.36 sq mi)
- Elevation: 850 m (2,790 ft)
- Highest elevation: 931 m (3,054 ft)
- Lowest elevation: 540 m (1,770 ft)
- Population (2023): 437
  - Density: 31.5/km^{2} (81.5/sq mi)
- Time zone: UTC+01:00 (CET)
  - Summer (DST): UTC+02:00 (CEST)
- INSEE/Postal code: 42192 /42380
- ^{1} French Land Register data, which excludes lakes, ponds, glaciers > 1 km^{2} (0.386 sq mi or 247 acres) and river estuaries.

Rozier-Côtes-d'Aurec (French pronunciation: [ʁozje kot doʁɛk]) is a commune in the Loire department in central France.

== Population ==
Historical population
Year	Pop.	±% p.a.
1968	387	—
1975	320	−2.68%
1982	271	−2.35%
1990	264	−0.33%
1999	359	+3.47%
2007	412	+1.74%
2012	451	+1.83%
2017	447	−0.18%
2023	437	−0.38%
Source: INSEE

== See also ==
- Communes of the Loire department
