= Saint-Nizier-de-Fornas =

- Commune
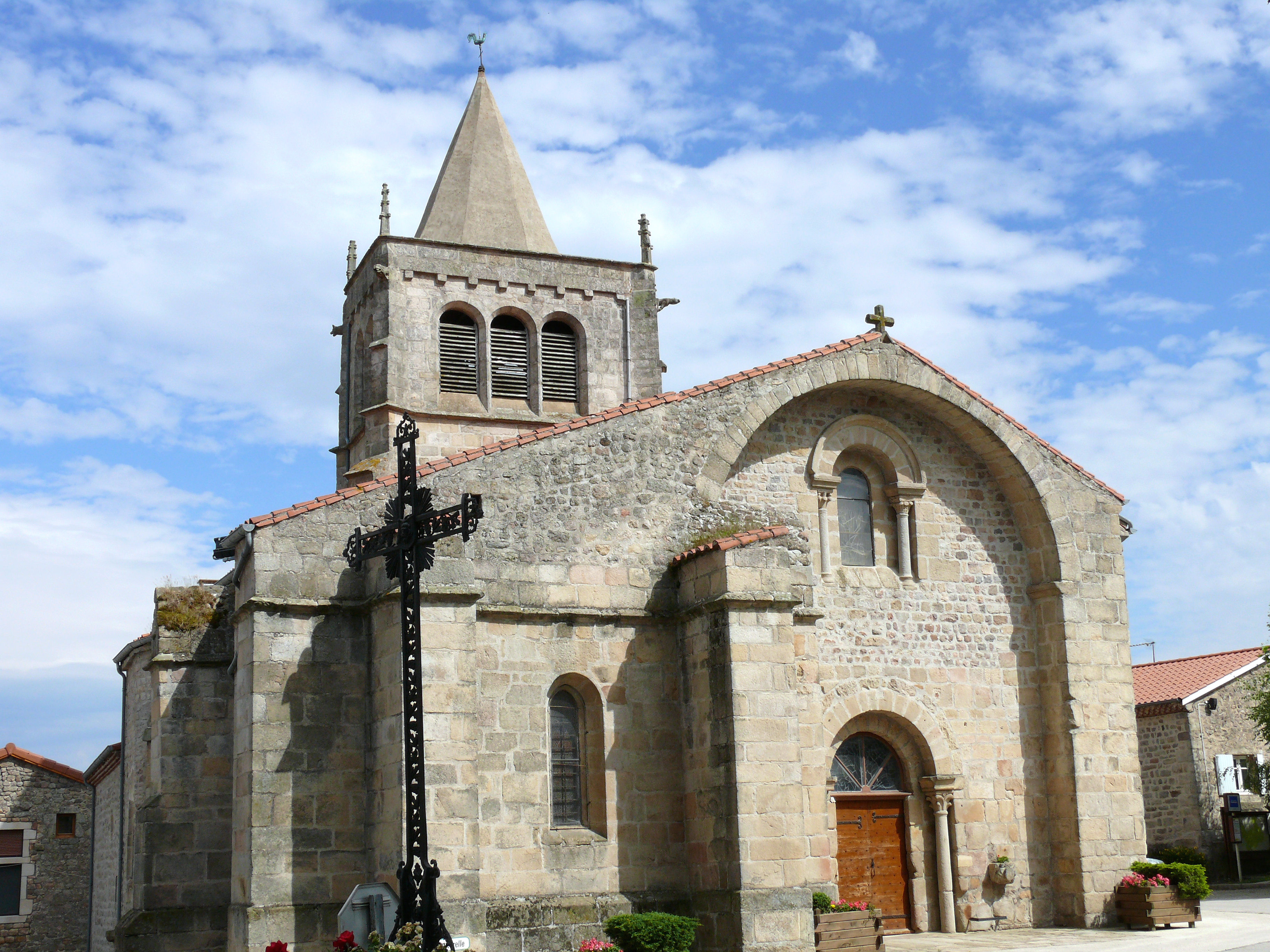

- Coat of arms
- Location of Saint-Nizier-de-Fornas
- Location within France Location within Auvergne-Rhône-Alpes
- Coordinates: 45°24′16″N 4°04′57″E
- Country: France
- Region: Auvergne-Rhône-Alpes
- Department: Loire
- Arrondissement: Montbrison
- Canton: Saint-Just-Saint-Rambert
- Intercommunality: Saint-Étienne Métropole

Government
  - Mayor (2020–2026): Gilbert Soulier
- Area^{1}: 15.88 km^{2} (6.13 sq mi)
- Elevation: 792 m (2,598 ft)
- Highest elevation: 995 m (3,264 ft)
- Lowest elevation: 619 m (2,031 ft)
- Population (2023): 655
  - Density: 41.2/km^{2} (107/sq mi)
- Time zone: UTC+01:00 (CET)
  - Summer (DST): UTC+02:00 (CEST)
- INSEE/Postal code: 42266 /42380
- ^{1} French Land Register data, which excludes lakes, ponds, glaciers > 1 km^{2} (0.386 sq mi or 247 acres) and river estuaries.

Saint-Nizier-de-Fornas is a commune in the Loire department in central France.

== Population ==
Historical population
Year	Pop.	±% p.a.
1968	452	—
1975	436	−0.51%
1982	453	+0.55%
1990	514	+1.59%
1999	585	+1.45%
2007	625	+0.83%
2012	652	+0.85%
2017	666	+0.43%
2023	655	−0.28%
Source: INSEE

== See also ==
- Communes of the Loire department
