= La Tourette =

- Commune
- Coat of arms
- Location of La Tourette
- Location within France Location within Auvergne-Rhône-Alpes
- Coordinates: 45°24′56″N 4°05′06″E
- Country: France
- Region: Auvergne-Rhône-Alpes
- Department: Loire
- Arrondissement: Montbrison
- Canton: Saint-Just-Saint-Rambert
- Intercommunality: Loire Forez Agglomération

Government
  - Mayor (2020–2026): Serge Granjon
- Area^{1}: 5.65 km^{2} (2.18 sq mi)
- Elevation: 800 m (2,600 ft)
- Highest elevation: 872 m (2,861 ft)
- Lowest elevation: 619 m (2,031 ft)
- Population (2023): 642
  - Density: 114/km^{2} (294/sq mi)
- Time zone: UTC+01:00 (CET)
  - Summer (DST): UTC+02:00 (CEST)
- INSEE/Postal code: 42312 /42380
- ^{1} French Land Register data, which excludes lakes, ponds, glaciers > 1 km^{2} (0.386 sq mi or 247 acres) and river estuaries.

La Tourette (French pronunciation: [la tuʁɛt]) is a commune in the Loire department in central France.

== Population ==
Historical population
| Year | Pop. | ±% p.a. |
|---|---|---|
| 1968 | 195 | — |
| 1975 | 209 | +1.00% |
| 1982 | 274 | +3.94% |
| 1990 | 389 | +4.48% |
| 1999 | 424 | +0.96% |
| 2007 | 511 | +2.36% |
| 2012 | 564 | +1.99% |
| 2017 | 584 | +0.70% |
| 2023 | 642 | +1.59% |
Source: INSEE

== See also ==
- Communes of the Loire department
