= Saint-Maurice-en-Gourgois =

- Commune
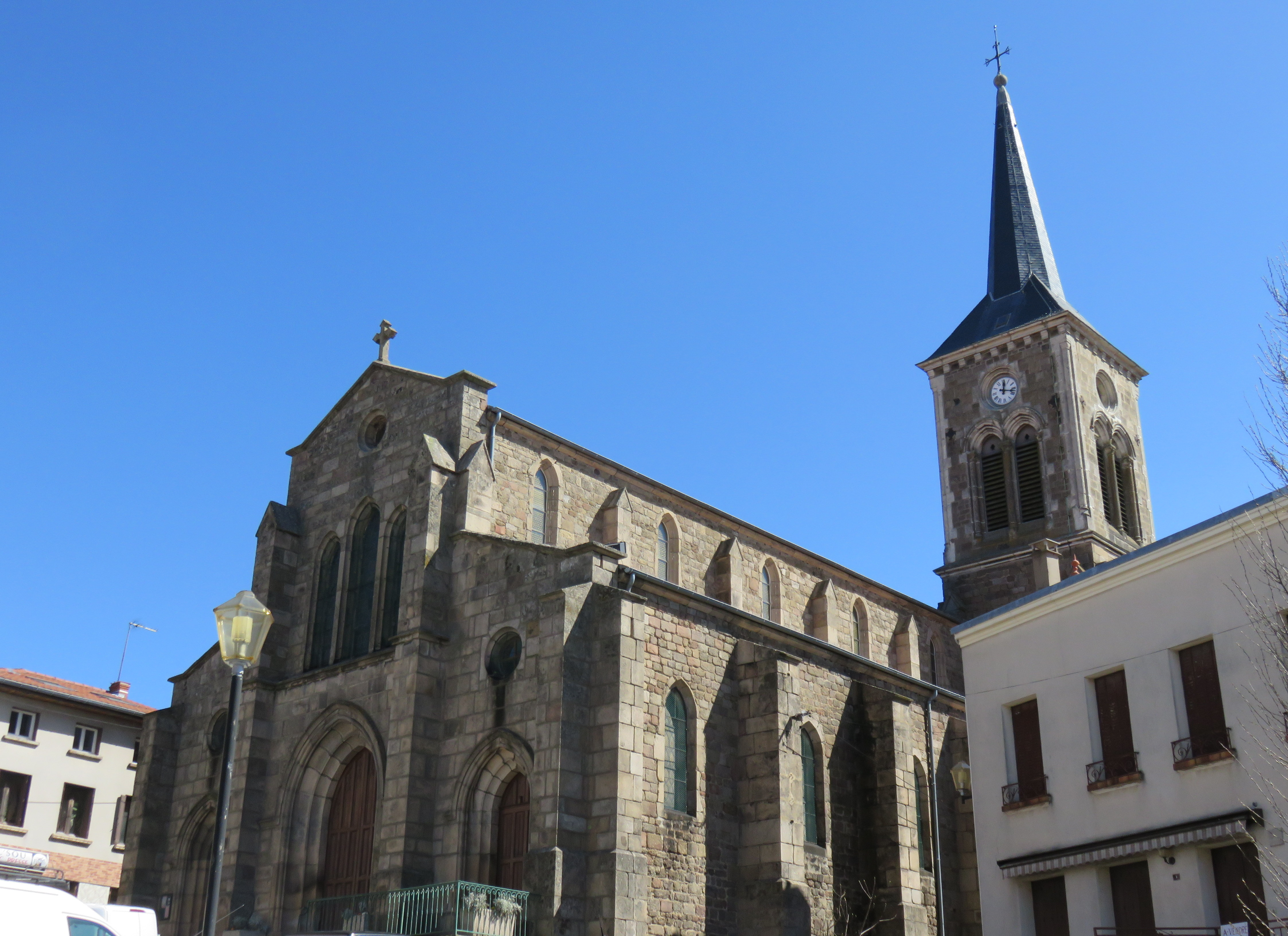

- Coat of arms
- Location of Saint-Maurice-en-Gourgois
- Location within France Location within Auvergne-Rhône-Alpes
- Coordinates: 45°24′08″N 4°11′02″E
- Country: France
- Region: Auvergne-Rhône-Alpes
- Department: Loire
- Arrondissement: Montbrison
- Canton: Saint-Just-Saint-Rambert
- Intercommunality: Saint-Étienne Métropole

Government
  - Mayor (2020–2026): Bernard Bonnet
- Area^{1}: 31.83 km^{2} (12.29 sq mi)
- Elevation: 790 m (2,590 ft)
- Highest elevation: 816 m (2,677 ft)
- Lowest elevation: 422 m (1,385 ft)
- Population (2023): 1,827
  - Density: 57.40/km^{2} (148.7/sq mi)
- Time zone: UTC+01:00 (CET)
  - Summer (DST): UTC+02:00 (CEST)
- INSEE/Postal code: 42262 /42240
- ^{1} French Land Register data, which excludes lakes, ponds, glaciers > 1 km^{2} (0.386 sq mi or 247 acres) and river estuaries.

Saint-Maurice-en-Gourgois (French: [sɛ̃ mɔʁis ɑ̃ ɡuʁɡwa]; Occitan: Sent Maurice de Gorgueis) is a commune in the Loire department in central France.

== Population ==
Historical population
Year	Pop.	±% p.a.
1968	823	—
1975	754	−1.24%
1982	859	+1.88%
1990	1,006	+1.99%
1999	1,277	+2.69%
2007	1,670	+3.41%
2012	1,744	+0.87%
2017	1,813	+0.78%
2023	1,827	+0.13%
Source: INSEE

== See also ==
- Communes of the Loire department
