= Canton of Saint-Just-Saint-Rambert =

Coordinates: 45.5344°N 4.2107°E

Saint-Just-Saint-Rambert
- Canton
- Country: France
- Region: Auvergne-Rhône-Alpes
- Department: Loire
- No. of communes: {{{nbcomm}}}
- Area: 356.94 km^{2} (137.82 sq mi)
- Population (2023): 45,947
  - Density: 128.72/km^{2} (333.40/sq mi)
- INSEE code: 42 20

The canton of Saint-Just-Saint-Rambert is a French administrative division located in the department of Loire and the Auvergne-Rhône-Alpes region. At the French canton reorganisation which came into effect in March 2015, the canton was expanded from 12 to 18 communes:

- Aboën
- Apinac
- Bonson
- Chambles
- Estivareilles
- Merle-Leignec
- Périgneux
- Rozier-Côtes-d'Aurec
- Saint-Bonnet-le-Château
- Saint-Cyprien
- Saint-Hilaire-Cusson-la-Valmitte
- Saint-Just-Saint-Rambert
- Saint-Marcellin-en-Forez
- Saint-Maurice-en-Gourgois
- Saint-Nizier-de-Fornas
- Sury-le-Comtal
- La Tourette
- Usson-en-Forez

== See also ==
- Cantons of the Loire department
