= Aboën =

- Commune
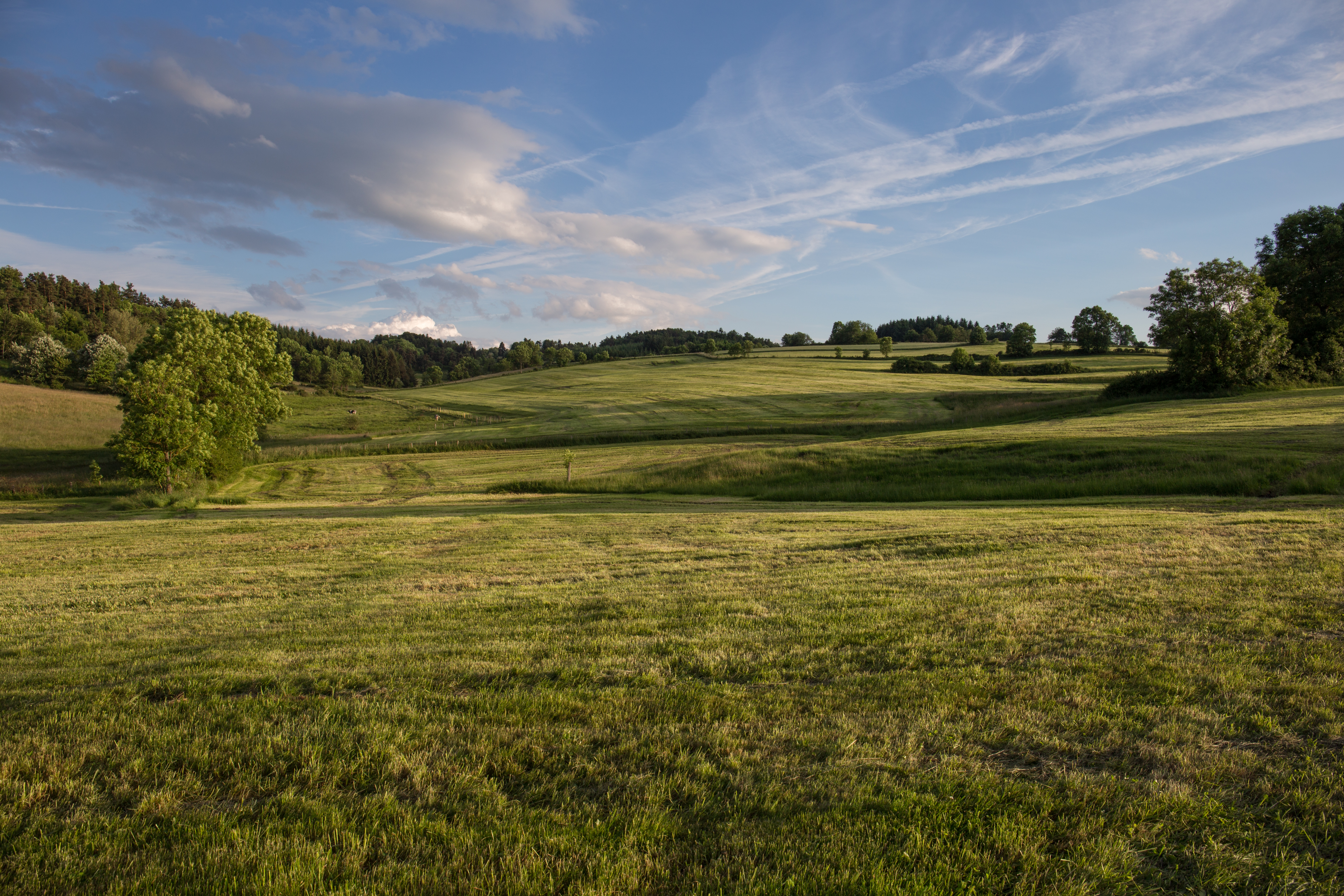
- Pastures of freshly-cut grass near Aboën, Loire, France.

- Coat of arms
- Location of Aboën
- Location within France Location within Auvergne-Rhône-Alpes
- Coordinates: 45°24′51″N 4°07′57″E
- Country: France
- Region: Auvergne-Rhône-Alpes
- Department: Loire
- Arrondissement: Montbrison
- Canton: Saint-Just-Saint-Rambert
- Intercommunality: Saint-Étienne Métropole

Government
  - Mayor (2020–2026): Christian Jouve
- Area^{1}: 8.96 km^{2} (3.46 sq mi)
- Elevation: 710 m (2,330 ft)
- Highest elevation: 771 m (2,530 ft)
- Lowest elevation: 594 m (1,949 ft)
- Population (2023): 481
  - Density: 53.7/km^{2} (139/sq mi)
- Demonym(s): Abrienais, Abrienaises
- Time zone: UTC+01:00 (CET)
  - Summer (DST): UTC+02:00 (CEST)
- INSEE/Postal code: 42001 /42380
- ^{1} French Land Register data, which excludes lakes, ponds, glaciers > 1 km^{2} (0.386 sq mi or 247 acres) and river estuaries.

Aboën (French pronunciation: [abwɛ̃]) is a commune in the Loire department in central France.

== Population ==
Historical population

Year	Pop.	±% p.a.
1876	610	—
1881	605	−0.16%
1886	615	+0.33%
1891	593	−0.73%
1896	618	+0.83%
1901	630	+0.39%
1906	613	−0.55%
1911	587	−0.86%
1921	509	−1.42%
1926	502	−0.28%
1931	458	−1.82%
1936	414	−2.00%

Year	Pop.	±% p.a.
1946	311	−2.82%
1954	280	−1.30%
1962	257	−1.07%
1968	246	−0.73%
1975	202	−2.78%
1982	181	−1.56%
1990	186	+0.34%
1999	234	+2.58%
2007	294	+2.89%
2012	396	+6.14%
2017	439	+2.08%
2023	481	+1.53%

Source: EHESS (1876-1999) and INSEE

== See also ==
- Communes of the Loire department
