= Estivareilles, Loire =

Estivareilles
- Commune
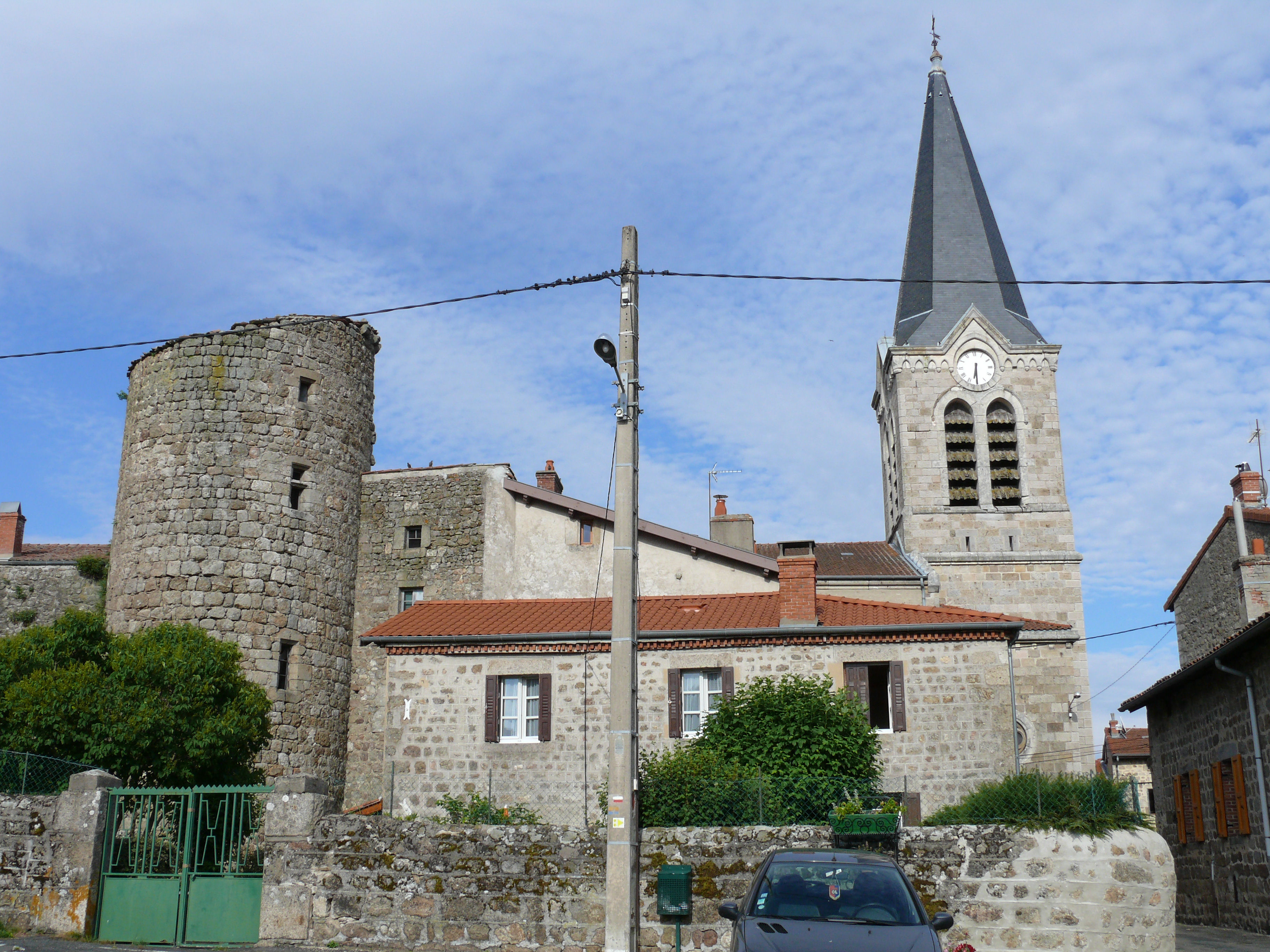

- Coat of arms
- Location of Estivareilles
- Location within France Location within Auvergne-Rhône-Alpes
- Coordinates: 45°25′04″N 4°00′41″E
- Country: France
- Region: Auvergne-Rhône-Alpes
- Department: Loire
- Arrondissement: Montbrison
- Canton: Saint-Just-Saint-Rambert
- Intercommunality: CA Loire Forez

Government
  - Mayor (2021–2026): Pierre Barthelemy
- Area^{1}: 22.56 km^{2} (8.71 sq mi)
- Elevation: 896 m (2,940 ft)
- Highest elevation: 1,149 m (3,770 ft)
- Lowest elevation: 885 m (2,904 ft)
- Population (2023): 721
  - Density: 32.0/km^{2} (82.8/sq mi)
- Time zone: UTC+01:00 (CET)
  - Summer (DST): UTC+02:00 (CEST)
- INSEE/Postal code: 42091 /42380
- ^{1} French Land Register data, which excludes lakes, ponds, glaciers > 1 km^{2} (0.386 sq mi or 247 acres) and river estuaries.

Estivareilles (French pronunciation: [ɛstivaʁɛj]; Occitan: Estivalelhas) is a commune in the Loire department in central France.

== Population ==
Historical population
Year	Pop.	±% p.a.
1968	681	—
1975	616	−1.42%
1982	541	−1.84%
1990	558	+0.39%
1999	520	−0.78%
2007	644	+2.71%
2012	696	+1.57%
2017	686	−0.29%
2023	721	+0.83%
Source: INSEE

== See also ==
- Communes of the Loire department
