= Saint-Hilaire-Cusson-la-Valmitte =

- Commune
- Location of Saint-Hilaire-Cusson-la-Valmitte
- Location within France Location within Auvergne-Rhône-Alpes
- Coordinates: 45°22′11″N 4°02′33″E
- Country: France
- Region: Auvergne-Rhône-Alpes
- Department: Loire
- Arrondissement: Montbrison
- Canton: Saint-Just-Saint-Rambert
- Intercommunality: CA Loire Forez

Government
  - Mayor (2020–2026): Nicole Girodon
- Area^{1}: 18.31 km^{2} (7.07 sq mi)
- Elevation: 915 m (3,002 ft)
- Highest elevation: 977 m (3,205 ft)
- Lowest elevation: 640 m (2,100 ft)
- Population (2023): 340
  - Density: 19/km^{2} (48/sq mi)
- Time zone: UTC+01:00 (CET)
  - Summer (DST): UTC+02:00 (CEST)
- INSEE/Postal code: 42235 /42380
- ^{1} French Land Register data, which excludes lakes, ponds, glaciers > 1 km^{2} (0.386 sq mi or 247 acres) and river estuaries.

Saint-Hilaire-Cusson-la-Valmitte (French pronunciation: [sɛ̃.t‿ilɛʁ kysɔ̃ la valmit]) is a commune in the Loire department in central France.

== See also ==
- Communes of the Loire department
