= Usson-en-Forez =

- Commune
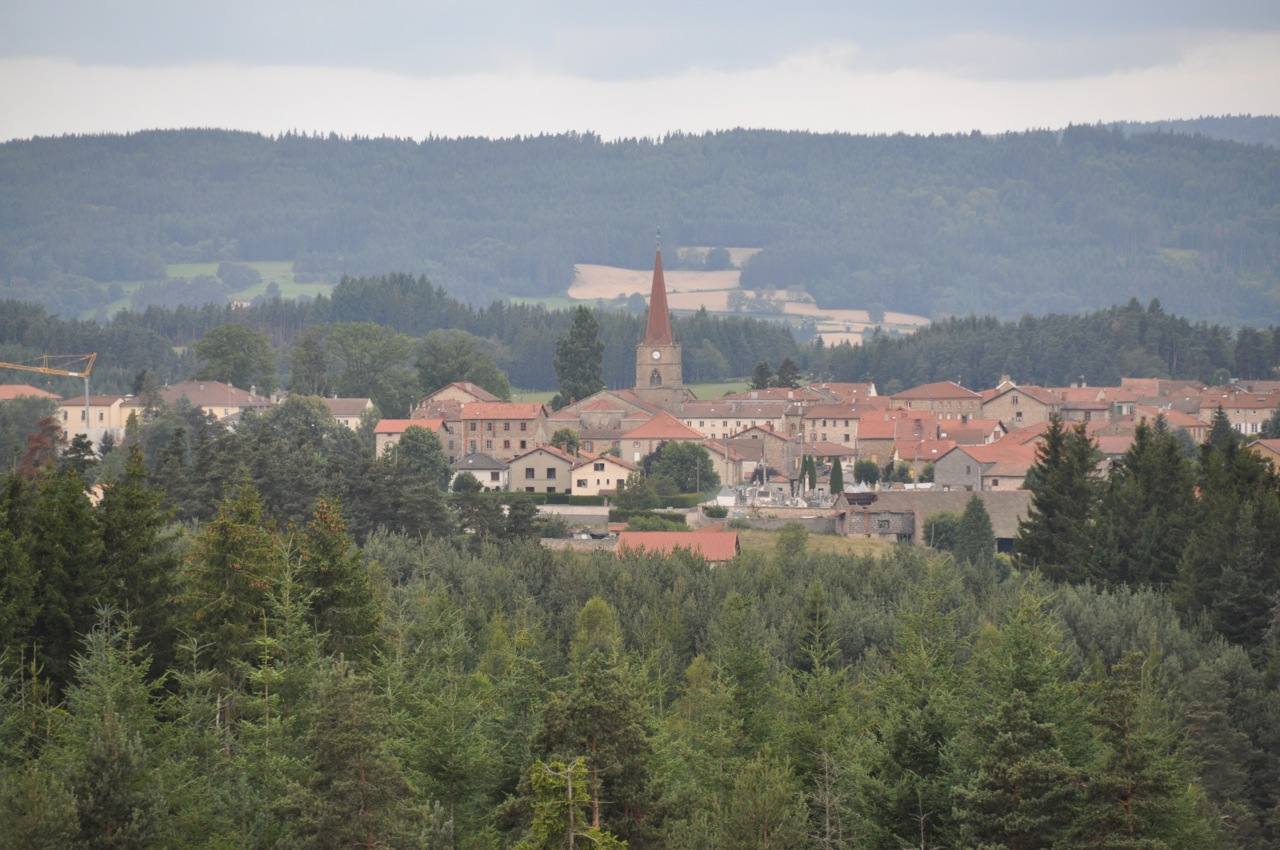

- Coat of arms
- Location of Usson-en-Forez
- Location within France Location within Auvergne-Rhône-Alpes
- Coordinates: 45°23′27″N 3°56′32″E
- Country: France
- Region: Auvergne-Rhône-Alpes
- Department: Loire
- Arrondissement: Montbrison
- Canton: Saint-Just-Saint-Rambert
- Intercommunality: Loire Forez Agglomération

Government
  - Mayor (2020–2026): Hervé Beal
- Area^{1}: 47.24 km^{2} (18.24 sq mi)
- Elevation: 915 m (3,002 ft)
- Highest elevation: 1,137 m (3,730 ft)
- Lowest elevation: 767 m (2,516 ft)
- Population (2023): 1,455
  - Density: 30.80/km^{2} (79.77/sq mi)
- Time zone: UTC+01:00 (CET)
  - Summer (DST): UTC+02:00 (CEST)
- INSEE/Postal code: 42318 /42550
- ^{1} French Land Register data, which excludes lakes, ponds, glaciers > 1 km^{2} (0.386 sq mi or 247 acres) and river estuaries.

Usson-en-Forez (French pronunciation: [ysɔ̃ ɑ̃ fɔʁɛ], literally Usson in Forez) is a commune in the Loire department in central France.

== Population ==
Historical population
Year	Pop.	±% p.a.
1968	1,698	—
1975	1,456	−2.17%
1982	1,342	−1.16%
1990	1,265	−0.74%
1999	1,232	−0.29%
2007	1,429	+1.87%
2012	1,476	+0.65%
2017	1,482	+0.08%
2023	1,455	−0.31%
Source: INSEE

== Personalities ==
- Lazarite priest Jean-Claude Faveyrial (1813–1893), author of the first book on the history of Albania.

== See also ==
- Communes of the Loire department
