= Canton of Chazelles-sur-Lyon =

Coordinates: 45.6165°N 4.3979°E

Chazelles-sur-Lyon
- Former canton
- Interactive map of Chazelles-sur-Lyon
- Country: France
- Region: Auvergne-Rhône-Alpes
- Department: Loire
- No. of communes: {{{nbcomm}}}
- Disbanded: 2015
- Area: 93.67 km^{2} (36.17 sq mi)
- Population (2012): 10,859
  - Density: 115.9/km^{2} (300.3/sq mi)

The canton of Chazelles-sur-Lyon is a French former administrative division located in the department of Loire. It was disbanded following the French canton reorganisation which came into effect in March 2015. It consisted of 10 communes, which joined the canton of Feurs in 2015. It had 10,859 inhabitants (2012).

The canton comprised the following communes:

- Châtelus
- Chazelles-sur-Lyon
- Chevrières
- La Gimond
- Grammond
- Maringes
- Saint-Denis-sur-Coise
- Saint-Médard-en-Forez
- Viricelles
- Virigneux

== See also ==
- Cantons of the Loire department
