= Orphan (2016 film) =

2016 French drama film

- Film poster
- French: Orpheline
- Directed by: Arnaud des Pallières
- Written by: Arnaud des Pallières
- Starring: Adèle Haenel; Adèle Exarchopoulos; Solène Rigot; Vega Cuzytek; Jalil Lespert
- Distributed by: Le Pacte
- Release dates: 8 September 2016 (TIFF); 29 March 2017 (France)
- Country: France
- Language: French
- Budget: $5.2 million
- Box office: $365.000

Orphan (French: Orpheline) is a 2016 French drama film directed by Arnaud des Pallières and starring Adèle Haenel, Adèle Exarchopoulos, Solène Rigot and Vega Cuzytek. It was screened in the Special Presentations section at the 2016 Toronto International Film Festival.

== Cast ==
- Adèle Haenel as Renée
- Adèle Exarchopoulos as Sandra
- Solène Rigot as Karine
- Vega Cuzytek as Kiki
- Jalil Lespert as Darius
- Gemma Arterton as Tara
- Nicolas Duvauchelle as Kiki's father
- Sergi López as Maurice
- Robert Hunger-Bühler as Lev
- Mehdi Meskar as Samy
- Karim Leklou as Antonio
- Olivier Lousteau as François
- Rayan Rabia as Hakim
- Nina Mélo as Cindy
- Jonas Bloquet as Patrick
- Sarah Suco as The radiologist
- Karl Sarafidis as The gynecologist
- Jennifer Decker as Kiki's mother
- Sabine Pakora as The prison guard
- Émilie Gavois-Kahn

== Production ==
Filming took place in July and September 2015 in the Loire department in Panissières, Épercieux-Saint-Paul, Civens, Saint-Galmier, Sainte-Agathe-la-Bouteresse as well as in the Rhône department in Le Pitaval (Brullioles) and Sainte-Foy-l'Argentière.
