= Arrondissement of Montbrison =

Coordinates: 45°36′14″N 4°03′47″E

Montbrison
- Arrondissement
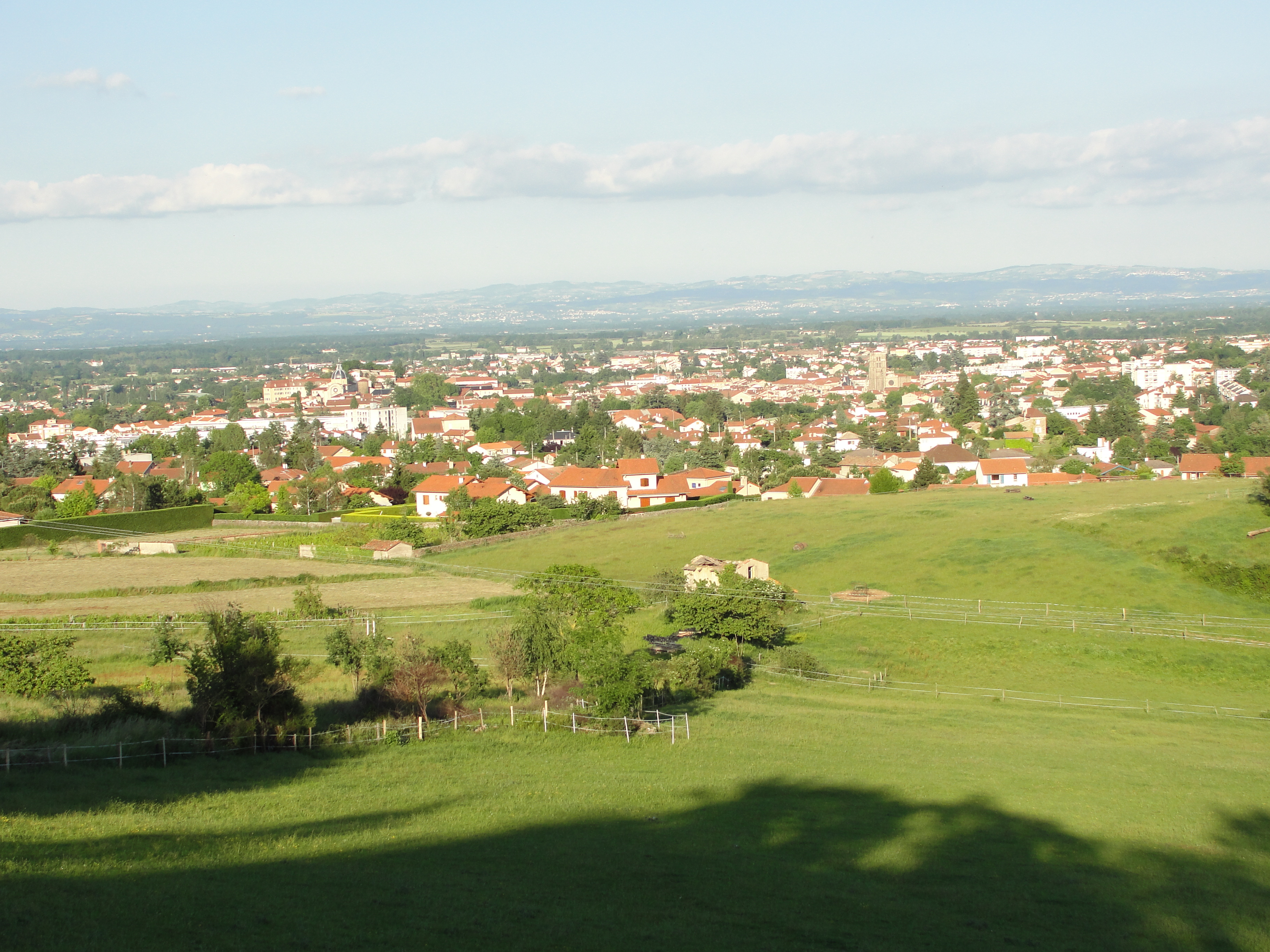
- Montbrison from the road coming from Saint-Bonnet le Courreau

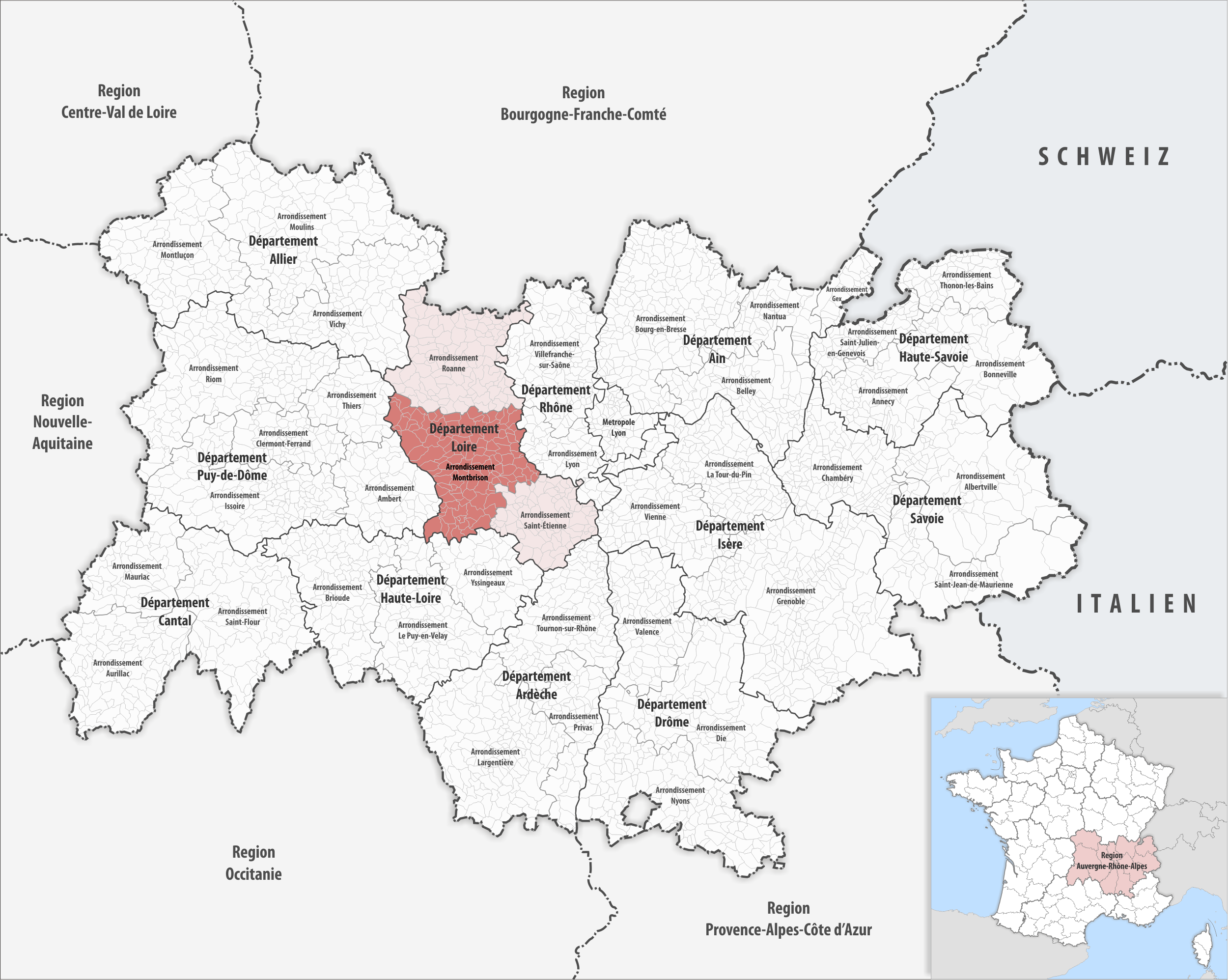
- Location within the region Auvergne-Rhône-Alpes
- Country: France
- Region: Auvergne-Rhône-Alpes
- Department: Loire
- No. of communes: {{{nbcomm}}}
- Area: 1,943.2 km^{2} (750.3 sq mi)
- Population (2023): 187,661
  - Density: 96.573/km^{2} (250.12/sq mi)
- INSEE code: 421

The arrondissement of Montbrison is located in the Loire department in the Auvergne-Rhône-Alpes region of France. It has 132 communes. Its population is 185,892 (2021), and its area is 1,943.2 km^{2} (750.3 sq mi).

== Composition ==
The communes of the arrondissement of Montbrison, and their INSEE codes, are:

1. Aboën (42001)
2. Ailleux (42002)
3. Apinac (42006)
4. Arthun (42009)
5. Aveizieux (42010)
6. Bard (42012)
7. Bellegarde-en-Forez (42013)
8. Boën-sur-Lignon (42019)
9. Boisset-lès-Montrond (42020)
10. Boisset-Saint-Priest (42021)
11. Bonson (42022)
12. Bussy-Albieux (42030)
13. Cervières (42034)
14. Cezay (42035)
15. Chalain-d'Uzore (42037)
16. Chalain-le-Comtal (42038)
17. Chalmazel-Jeansagnière (42039)
18. La Chamba (42040)
19. Chambéon (42041)
20. Chambles (42042)
21. Chambœuf (42043)
22. La Chambonie (42045)
23. Champdieu (42046)
24. La Chapelle-en-Lafaye (42050)
25. Châtelneuf (42054)
26. Châtelus (42055)
27. Chazelles-sur-Lavieu (42058)
28. Chazelles-sur-Lyon (42059)
29. Chenereilles (42060)
30. Chevrières (42062)
31. Civens (42065)
32. Cleppé (42066)
33. La Côte-Saint-Didier (42217)
34. Cottance (42073)
35. Craintilleux (42075)
36. Cuzieu (42081)
37. Écotay-l'Olme (42087)
38. Épercieux-Saint-Paul (42088)
39. Essertines-en-Châtelneuf (42089)
40. Essertines-en-Donzy (42090)
41. Estivareilles (42091)
42. Feurs (42094)
43. La Gimond (42100)
44. Grammond (42102)
45. Grézieux-le-Fromental (42105)
46. Gumières (42107)
47. L'Hôpital-le-Grand (42108)
48. Jas (42113)
49. Lavieu (42117)
50. Leigneux (42119)
51. Lérigneux (42121)
52. Lézigneux (42122)
53. Luriecq (42126)
54. Magneux-Haute-Rive (42130)
55. Marcilly-le-Châtel (42134)
56. Marclopt (42135)
57. Marcoux (42136)
58. Margerie-Chantagret (42137)
59. Maringes (42138)
60. Marols (42140)
61. Merle-Leignec (42142)
62. Mizérieux (42143)
63. Montarcher (42146)
64. Montbrison (42147)
65. Montchal (42148)
66. Montrond-les-Bains (42149)
67. Montverdun (42150)
68. Mornand-en-Forez (42151)
69. Nervieux (42155)
70. Noirétable (42159)
71. Palogneux (42164)
72. Panissières (42165)
73. Périgneux (42169)
74. Poncins (42174)
75. Pouilly-lès-Feurs (42175)
76. Pralong (42179)
77. Précieux (42180)
78. Rivas (42185)
79. Roche-en-Forez (42188)
80. Rozier-Côtes-d'Aurec (42192)
81. Rozier-en-Donzy (42193)
82. Sail-sous-Couzan (42195)
83. Saint-André-le-Puy (42200)
84. Saint-Barthélemy-Lestra (42202)
85. Saint-Bonnet-le-Château (42204)
86. Saint-Bonnet-le-Courreau (42205)
87. Saint-Bonnet-les-Oules (42206)
88. Saint-Cyprien (42211)
89. Saint-Cyr-les-Vignes (42214)
90. Saint-Denis-sur-Coise (42216)
91. Sainte-Agathe-la-Bouteresse (42197)
92. Sainte-Foy-Saint-Sulpice (42221)
93. Saint-Étienne-le-Molard (42219)
94. Saint-Galmier (42222)
95. Saint-Georges-en-Couzan (42227)
96. Saint-Georges-Haute-Ville (42228)
97. Saint-Hilaire-Cusson-la-Valmitte (42235)
98. Saint-Jean-la-Vêtre (42238)
99. Saint-Jean-Soleymieux (42240)
100. Saint-Just-en-Bas (42247)
101. Saint-Just-Saint-Rambert (42279)
102. Saint-Laurent-la-Conche (42251)
103. Saint-Marcellin-en-Forez (42256)
104. Saint-Martin-Lestra (42261)
105. Saint-Maurice-en-Gourgois (42262)
106. Saint-Médard-en-Forez (42264)
107. Saint-Nizier-de-Fornas (42266)
108. Saint-Paul-d'Uzore (42269)
109. Saint-Priest-la-Vêtre (42278)
110. Saint-Romain-le-Puy (42285)
111. Saint-Sixte (42288)
112. Saint-Thomas-la-Garde (42290)
113. Les Salles (42295)
114. Salt-en-Donzy (42296)
115. Salvizinet (42297)
116. Sauvain (42298)
117. Savigneux (42299)
118. Soleymieux (42301)
119. Solore-en-Forez (42084)
120. Sury-le-Comtal (42304)
121. La Tourette (42312)
122. Trelins (42313)
123. Unias (42315)
124. Usson-en-Forez (42318)
125. Valeille (42319)
126. La Valla-sur-Rochefort (42321)
127. Veauche (42323)
128. Veauchette (42324)
129. Verrières-en-Forez (42328)
130. Vêtre-sur-Anzon (42245)
131. Viricelles (42335)
132. Virigneux (42336)

== History ==
The arrondissement of Montbrison was created in 1800. In January 2017 it lost the commune Andrézieux-Bouthéon to the arrondissement of Saint-Étienne.

As a result of the reorganisation of the cantons of France which came into effect in 2015, the borders of the cantons are no longer related to the borders of the arrondissements. The cantons of the arrondissement of Montbrison were, as of January 2015:

1. Boën-sur-Lignon
2. Chazelles-sur-Lyon
3. Feurs
4. Montbrison
5. Noirétable
6. Saint-Bonnet-le-Château
7. Saint-Galmier
8. Saint-Georges-en-Couzan
9. Saint-Jean-Soleymieux
10. Saint-Just-Saint-Rambert
