= Montchal =

- Commune
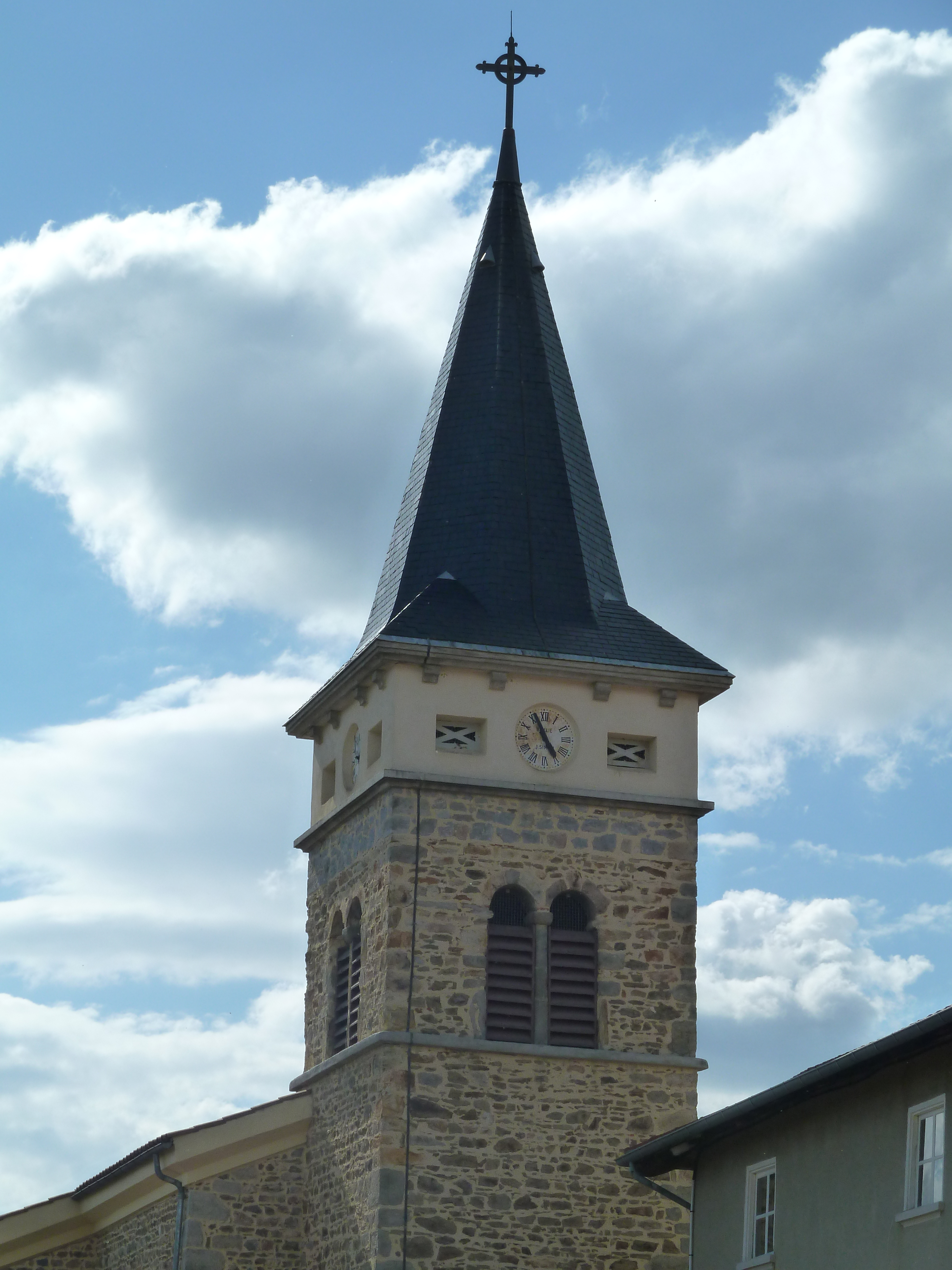
- Location of Montchal
- Location within France Location within Auvergne-Rhône-Alpes
- Coordinates: 45°49′36″N 4°18′55″E
- Country: France
- Region: Auvergne-Rhône-Alpes
- Department: Loire
- Arrondissement: Montbrison
- Canton: Feurs

Government
  - Mayor (2020–2026): Christian Denis
- Area^{1}: 8.84 km^{2} (3.41 sq mi)
- Elevation: 640 m (2,100 ft)
- Highest elevation: 782 m (2,566 ft)
- Lowest elevation: 512 m (1,680 ft)
- Population (2023): 512
  - Density: 57.9/km^{2} (150/sq mi)
- Time zone: UTC+01:00 (CET)
  - Summer (DST): UTC+02:00 (CEST)
- INSEE/Postal code: 42148 /42360
- ^{1} French Land Register data, which excludes lakes, ponds, glaciers > 1 km^{2} (0.386 sq mi or 247 acres) and river estuaries.

Montchal (French pronunciation: [mɔ̃ʃal]) is a commune in the Loire department in central France.

== Population ==
Historical population
Year	Pop.	±% p.a.
1968	493	—
1975	468	−0.74%
1982	470	+0.06%
1990	391	−2.27%
1999	425	+0.93%
2007	452	+0.77%
2012	478	+1.12%
2017	492	+0.58%
2023	512	+0.67%
Source: INSEE

== See also ==
- Communes of the Loire department
