= Essertines-en-Donzy =

- Commune
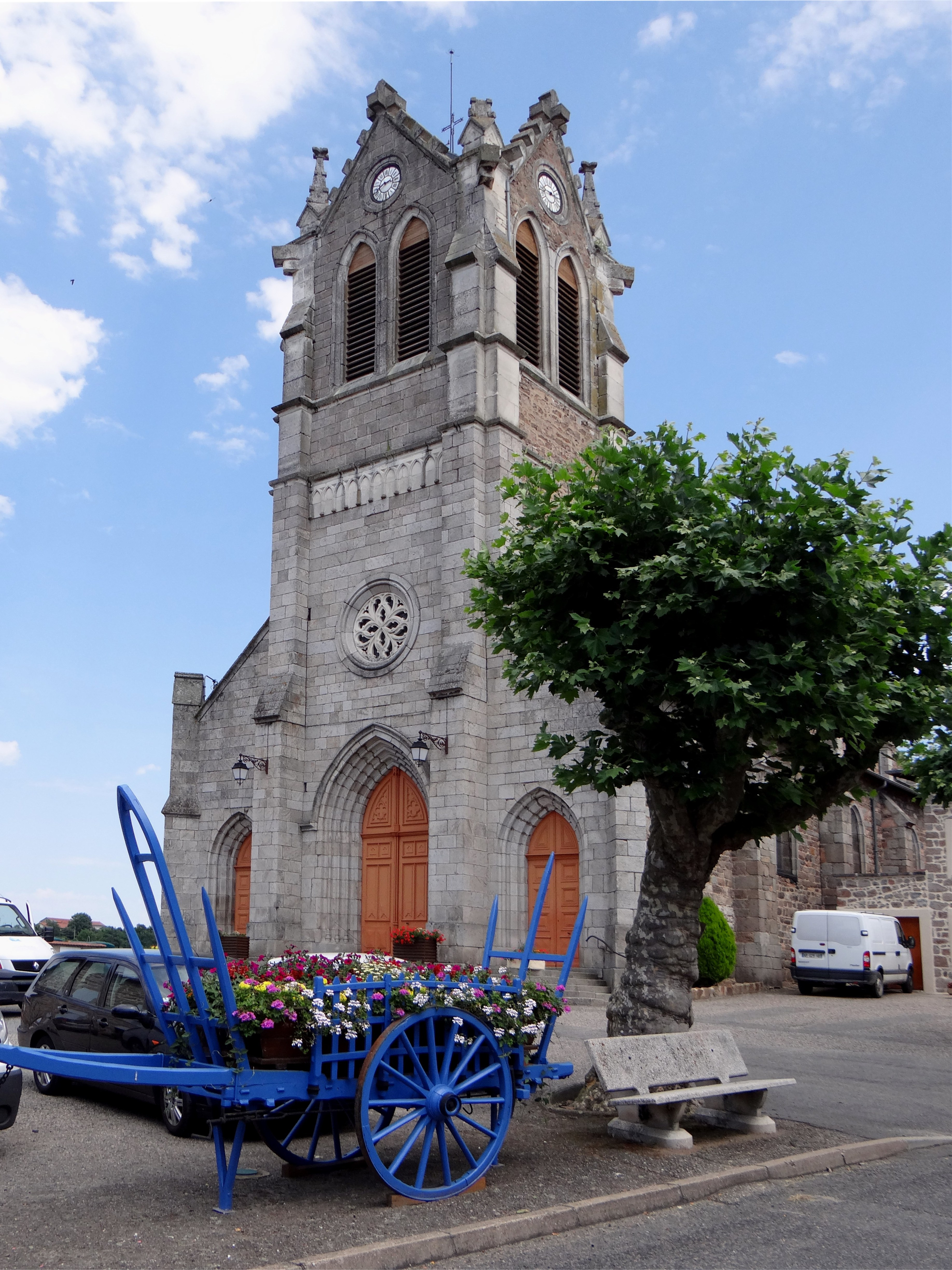
- Location of Essertines-en-Donzy
- Location within France Location within Auvergne-Rhône-Alpes
- Coordinates: 45°45′15″N 4°20′48″E
- Country: France
- Region: Auvergne-Rhône-Alpes
- Department: Loire
- Arrondissement: Montbrison
- Canton: Feurs

Government
  - Mayor (2020–2026): Jérôme Pigeron
- Area^{1}: 6.97 km^{2} (2.69 sq mi)
- Elevation: 535 m (1,755 ft)
- Highest elevation: 590 m (1,940 ft)
- Lowest elevation: 456 m (1,496 ft)
- Population (2023): 477
  - Density: 68.4/km^{2} (177/sq mi)
- Time zone: UTC+01:00 (CET)
  - Summer (DST): UTC+02:00 (CEST)
- INSEE/Postal code: 42090 /42360
- ^{1} French Land Register data, which excludes lakes, ponds, glaciers > 1 km^{2} (0.386 sq mi or 247 acres) and river estuaries.

Essertines-en-Donzy (French pronunciation: [ɛsɛʁtin ɑ̃ dɔ̃zi]) is a commune in the Loire department in central France.

== Population ==
Historical population
Year	Pop.	±% p.a.
1968	495	—
1975	424	−2.19%
1982	419	−0.17%
1990	397	−0.67%
1999	434	+1.00%
2007	480	+1.27%
2012	494	+0.58%
2017	490	−0.16%
2023	477	−0.45%
Source: INSEE

== See also ==
- Communes of the Loire department
