= Salvizinet =

- Commune
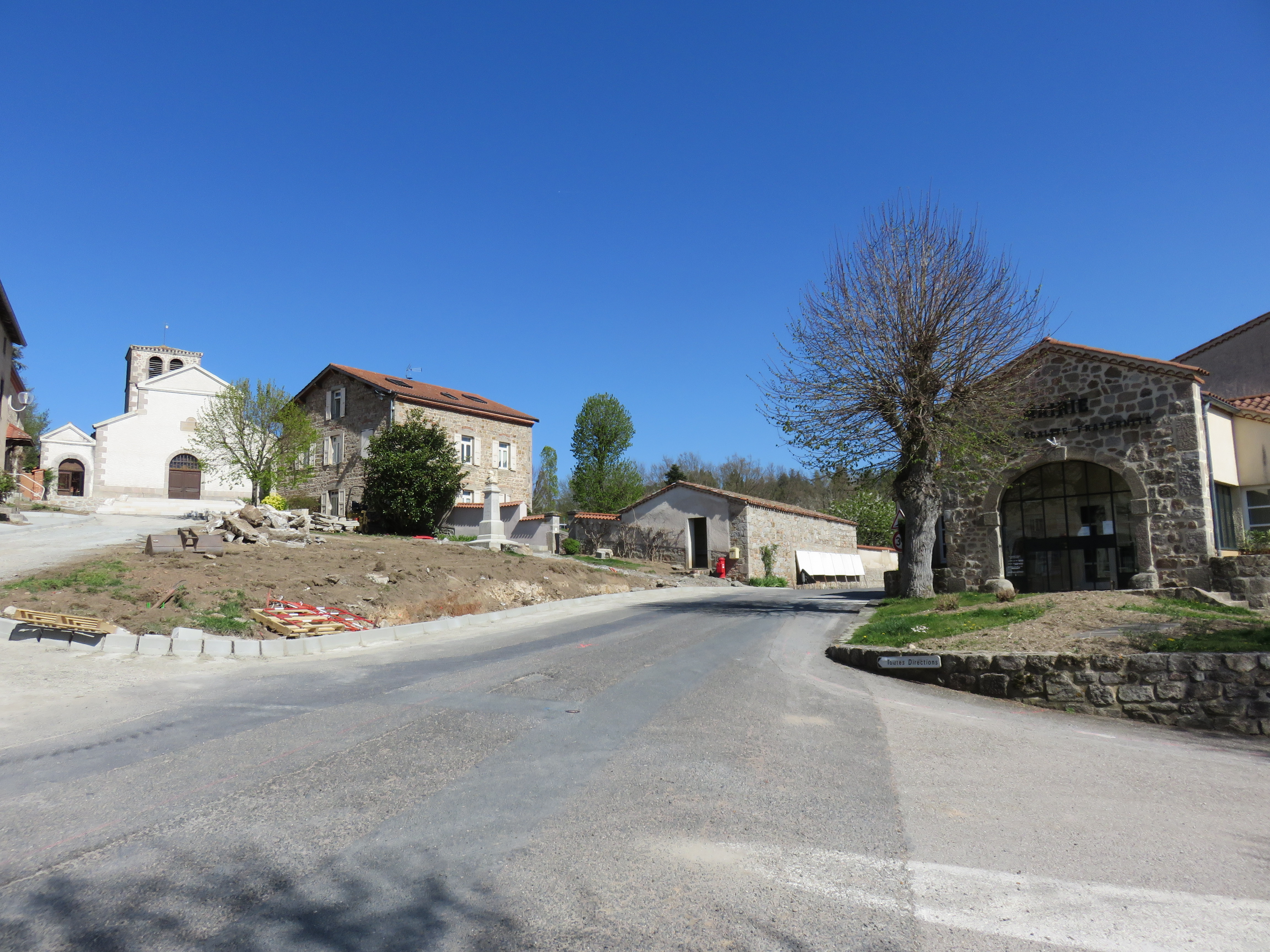

- Coat of arms
- Location of Salvizinet
- Location within France Location within Auvergne-Rhône-Alpes
- Coordinates: 45°45′37″N 4°16′32″E
- Country: France
- Region: Auvergne-Rhône-Alpes
- Department: Loire
- Arrondissement: Montbrison
- Canton: Feurs

Government
  - Mayor (2020–2026): Pascal Tissot
- Area^{1}: 10.84 km^{2} (4.19 sq mi)
- Elevation: 470 m (1,540 ft)
- Highest elevation: 552 m (1,811 ft)
- Lowest elevation: 340 m (1,120 ft)
- Population (2023): 623
  - Density: 57.5/km^{2} (149/sq mi)
- Time zone: UTC+01:00 (CET)
  - Summer (DST): UTC+02:00 (CEST)
- INSEE/Postal code: 42297 /42110
- ^{1} French Land Register data, which excludes lakes, ponds, glaciers > 1 km^{2} (0.386 sq mi or 247 acres) and river estuaries.

Salvizinet (French pronunciation: [salvizinɛ]) is a commune in the Loire department in central France.

== Population ==
Historical population
Year	Pop.	±% p.a.
1968	261	—
1975	310	+2.49%
1982	367	+2.44%
1990	377	+0.34%
1999	488	+2.91%
2007	624	+3.12%
2012	585	−1.28%
2017	589	+0.14%
2023	623	+0.94%
Source: INSEE

== See also ==
- Communes of the Loire department
