= Jas, Loire =

Jas
- Commune
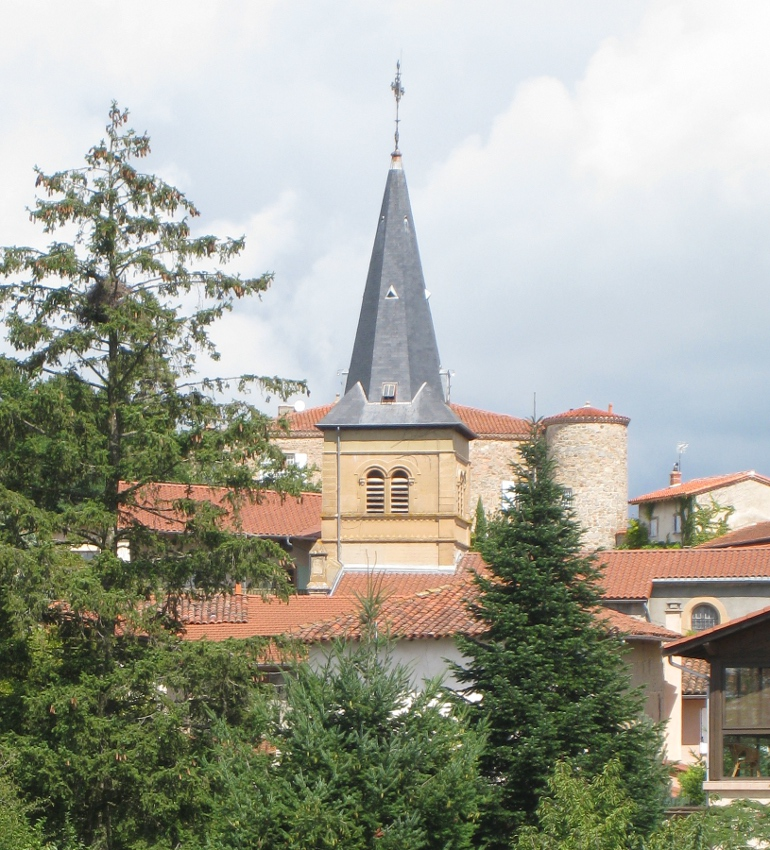
- Location of Jas
- Location within France Location within Auvergne-Rhône-Alpes
- Coordinates: 45°44′47″N 4°18′40″E
- Country: France
- Region: Auvergne-Rhône-Alpes
- Department: Loire
- Arrondissement: Montbrison
- Canton: Feurs

Government
  - Mayor (2020–2026): Marc Rodrigue
- Area^{1}: 6.22 km^{2} (2.40 sq mi)
- Elevation: 536 m (1,759 ft)
- Highest elevation: 571 m (1,873 ft)
- Lowest elevation: 368 m (1,207 ft)
- Population (2023): 243
  - Density: 39.1/km^{2} (101/sq mi)
- Time zone: UTC+01:00 (CET)
  - Summer (DST): UTC+02:00 (CEST)
- INSEE/Postal code: 42113 /42110
- ^{1} French Land Register data, which excludes lakes, ponds, glaciers > 1 km^{2} (0.386 sq mi or 247 acres) and river estuaries.

Jas is a commune in the Loire department in central France.

== Population ==
Historical population
Year	Pop.	±% p.a.
1968	188	—
1975	165	−1.85%
1982	153	−1.07%
1990	149	−0.33%
1999	177	+1.93%
2007	187	+0.69%
2012	224	+3.68%
2017	222	−0.18%
2023	243	+1.52%
Source: INSEE

== See also ==
- Communes of the Loire department
