= Valeille =

- Commune
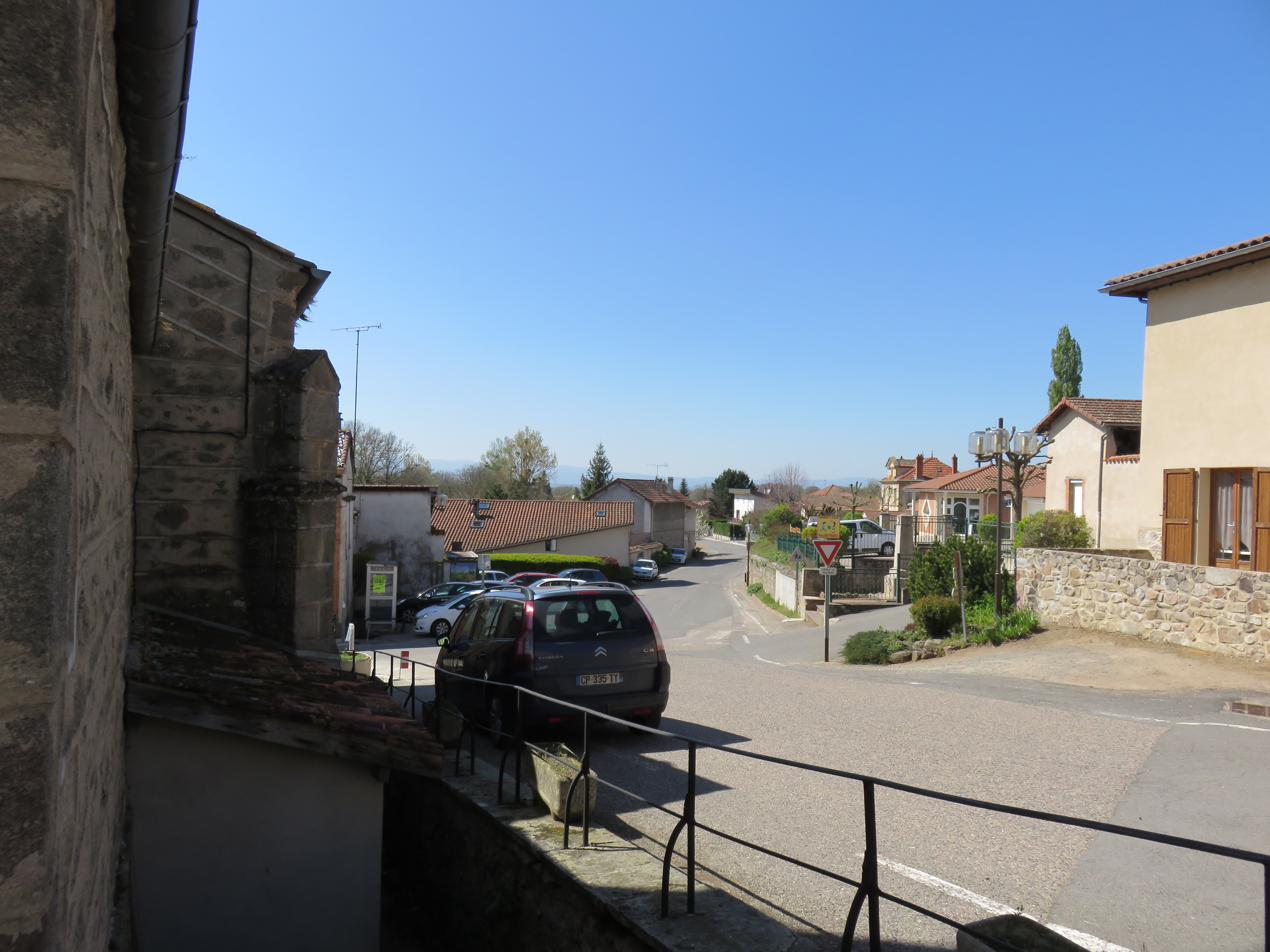
- Location of Valeille
- Location within France Location within Auvergne-Rhône-Alpes
- Coordinates: 45°42′30″N 4°18′27″E
- Country: France
- Region: Auvergne-Rhône-Alpes
- Department: Loire
- Arrondissement: Montbrison
- Canton: Feurs

Government
  - Mayor (2020–2026): Robert Flamand
- Area^{1}: 16.43 km^{2} (6.34 sq mi)
- Elevation: 400 m (1,300 ft)
- Highest elevation: 532 m (1,745 ft)
- Lowest elevation: 350 m (1,150 ft)
- Population (2023): 675
  - Density: 41.1/km^{2} (106/sq mi)
- Time zone: UTC+01:00 (CET)
  - Summer (DST): UTC+02:00 (CEST)
- INSEE/Postal code: 42319 /42110
- ^{1} French Land Register data, which excludes lakes, ponds, glaciers > 1 km^{2} (0.386 sq mi or 247 acres) and river estuaries.

Valeille (French pronunciation: [valɛj]) is a commune in the Loire department in central France.

== Population ==
Historical population
Year	Pop.	±% p.a.
1968	428	—
1975	397	−1.07%
1982	391	−0.22%
1990	470	+2.33%
1999	518	+1.09%
2007	607	+2.00%
2012	674	+2.12%
2017	737	+1.80%
2023	675	−1.45%
Source: INSEE

== See also ==
- Communes of the Loire department
