= Cleppé =

- Commune
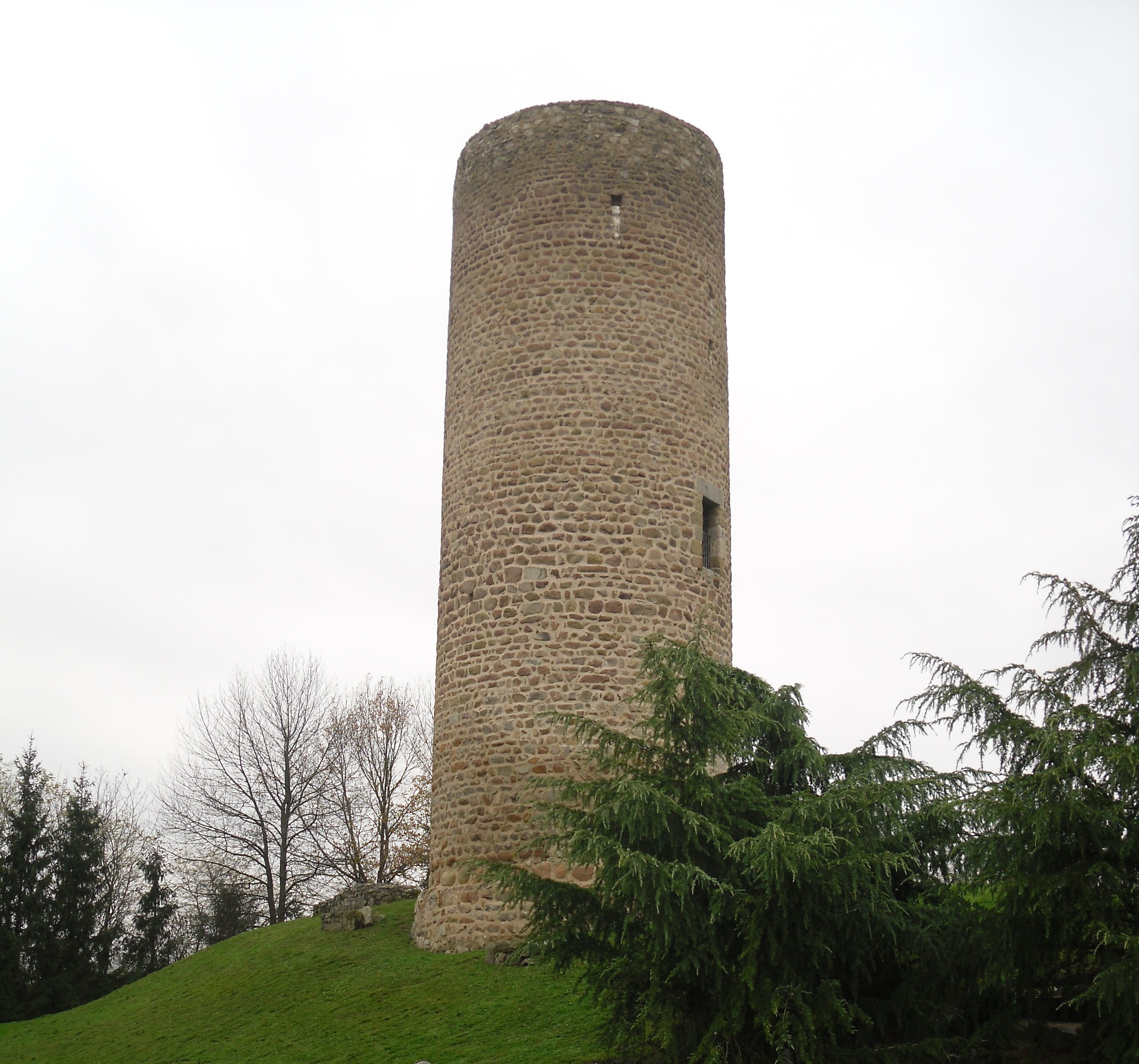
- Ruins of the chateau
- Location of Cleppé
- Location within France Location within Auvergne-Rhône-Alpes
- Coordinates: 45°46′12″N 4°10′51″E
- Country: France
- Region: Auvergne-Rhône-Alpes
- Department: Loire
- Arrondissement: Montbrison
- Canton: Feurs

Government
  - Mayor (2020–2026): Simon Couble
- Area^{1}: 15.48 km^{2} (5.98 sq mi)
- Elevation: 350 m (1,150 ft)
- Highest elevation: 394 m (1,293 ft)
- Lowest elevation: 323 m (1,060 ft)
- Population (2023): 572
  - Density: 37.0/km^{2} (95.7/sq mi)
- Time zone: UTC+01:00 (CET)
  - Summer (DST): UTC+02:00 (CEST)
- INSEE/Postal code: 42066 /42110
- ^{1} French Land Register data, which excludes lakes, ponds, glaciers > 1 km^{2} (0.386 sq mi or 247 acres) and river estuaries.

Cleppé (French pronunciation: [klɛpe]) is a commune in the Loire department in central France.

== Geography ==
The river Lignon du Forez flows through the commune.

== Population ==
Historical population
Year	Pop.	±% p.a.
1968	456	—
1975	409	−1.54%
1982	360	−1.81%
1990	404	+1.45%
1999	454	+1.30%
2007	552	+2.47%
2012	570	+0.64%
2017	529	−1.48%
2023	572	+1.31%
Source: INSEE

== See also ==
- Communes of the Loire department
