= Poncins =

- Commune
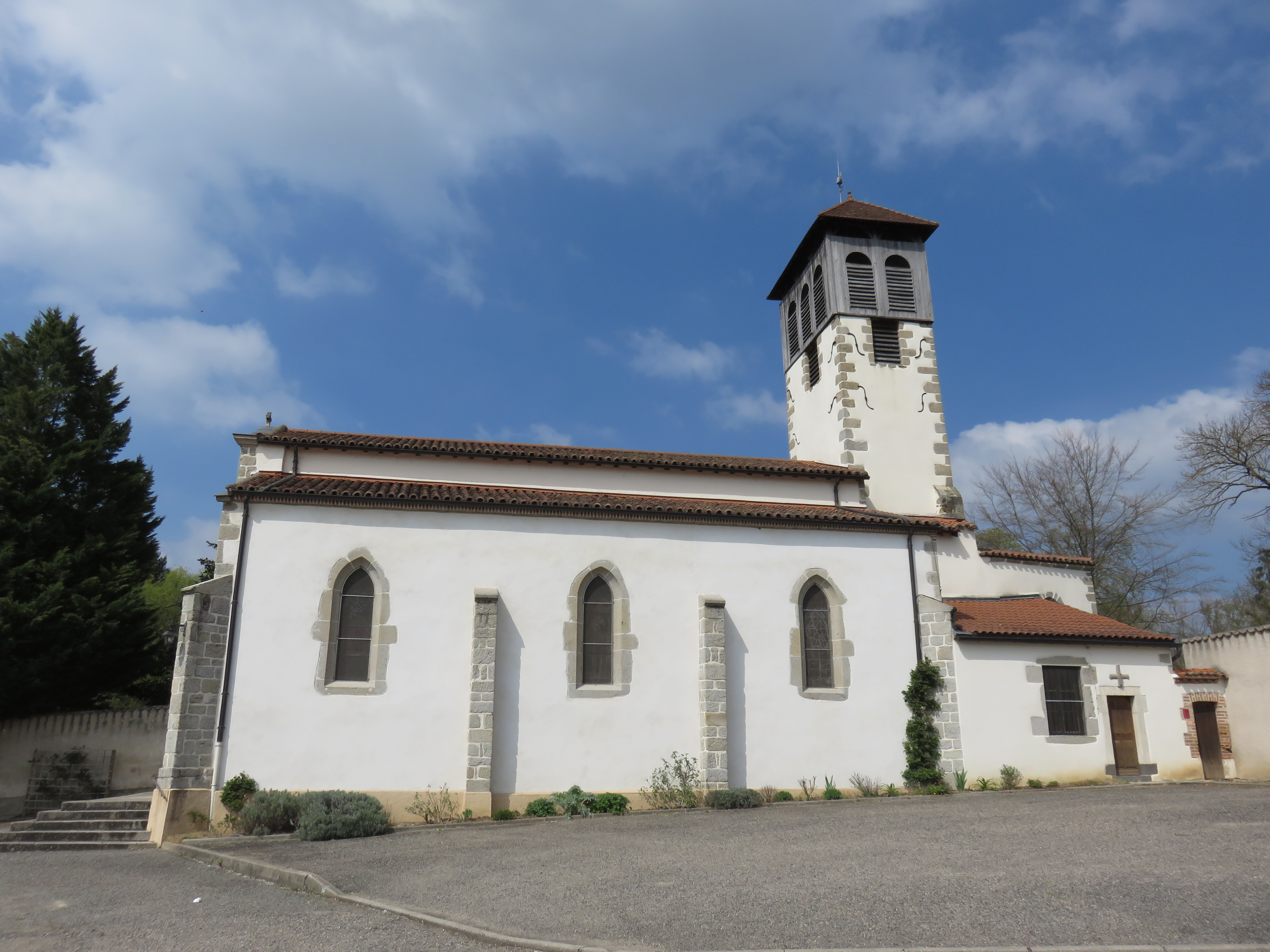

- Coat of arms
- Location of Poncins
- Location within France Location within Auvergne-Rhône-Alpes
- Coordinates: 45°43′43″N 4°09′46″E
- Country: France
- Region: Auvergne-Rhône-Alpes
- Department: Loire
- Arrondissement: Montbrison
- Canton: Feurs

Government
  - Mayor (2020–2026): Julien Duché
- Area^{1}: 20.63 km^{2} (7.97 sq mi)
- Elevation: 330 m (1,080 ft)
- Highest elevation: 393 m (1,289 ft)
- Lowest elevation: 331 m (1,086 ft)
- Population (2023): 1,318
  - Density: 63.89/km^{2} (165.5/sq mi)
- Time zone: UTC+01:00 (CET)
  - Summer (DST): UTC+02:00 (CEST)
- INSEE/Postal code: 42174 /42110
- ^{1} French Land Register data, which excludes lakes, ponds, glaciers > 1 km^{2} (0.386 sq mi or 247 acres) and river estuaries.

Poncins (French pronunciation: [pɔ̃sɛ̃]) is a commune in the Loire department in central France.

== Geography ==
The river Lignon du Forez flows through the commune.

== Population ==
Historical population
Year	Pop.	±% p.a.
1968	579	—
1975	546	−0.83%
1982	632	+2.11%
1990	679	+0.90%
1999	754	+1.17%
2007	836	+1.30%
2012	955	+2.70%
2017	1,097	+2.81%
2023	1,318	+3.11%
Source: INSEE

== See also ==
- Communes of the Loire department
