= Saint-Laurent-la-Conche =

- Commune
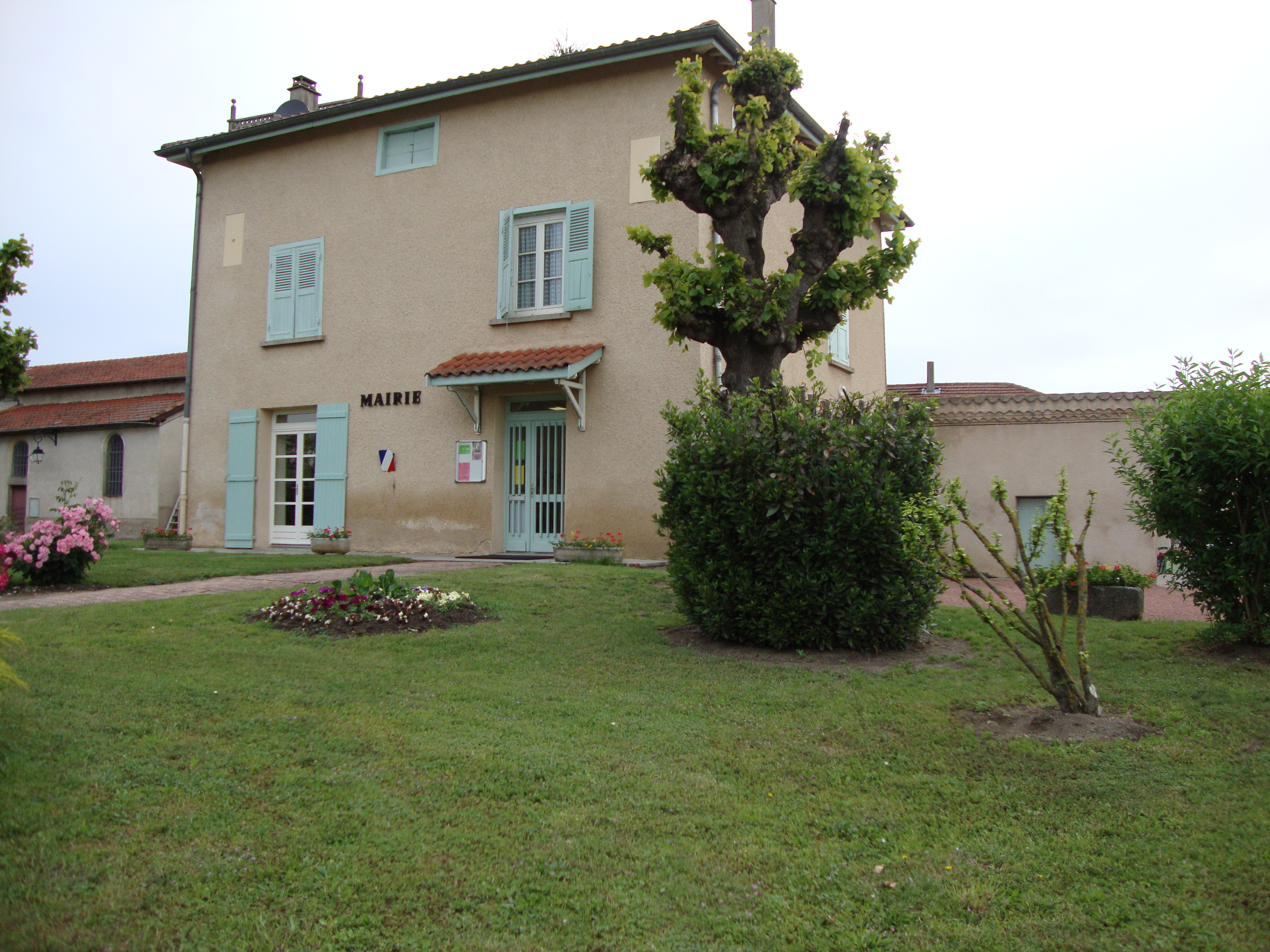
- Town hall

- Coat of arms
- Location of Saint-Laurent-la-Conche
- Location within France Location within Auvergne-Rhône-Alpes
- Coordinates: 45°41′05″N 4°12′43″E
- Country: France
- Region: Auvergne-Rhône-Alpes
- Department: Loire
- Arrondissement: Montbrison
- Canton: Feurs

Government
  - Mayor (2020–2026): Jean-Luc Poyade
- Area^{1}: 15.51 km^{2} (5.99 sq mi)
- Elevation: 350 m (1,150 ft)
- Highest elevation: 366 m (1,201 ft)
- Lowest elevation: 326 m (1,070 ft)
- Population (2023): 573
  - Density: 36.9/km^{2} (95.7/sq mi)
- Time zone: UTC+01:00 (CET)
  - Summer (DST): UTC+02:00 (CEST)
- INSEE/Postal code: 42251 /42210
- ^{1} French Land Register data, which excludes lakes, ponds, glaciers > 1 km^{2} (0.386 sq mi or 247 acres) and river estuaries.

Saint-Laurent-la-Conche (French pronunciation: [sɛ̃ loʁɑ̃ la kɔ̃ʃ]) is a commune in the Loire department in central France.

== Population ==
Historical population
Year	Pop.	±% p.a.
1968	244	—
1975	262	+1.02%
1982	316	+2.71%
1990	430	+3.93%
1999	480	+1.23%
2007	565	+2.06%
2012	608	+1.48%
2017	608	+0.00%
2023	573	−0.98%
Source: INSEE

== See also ==
- Communes of the Loire department
