= Salt-en-Donzy =

- Commune
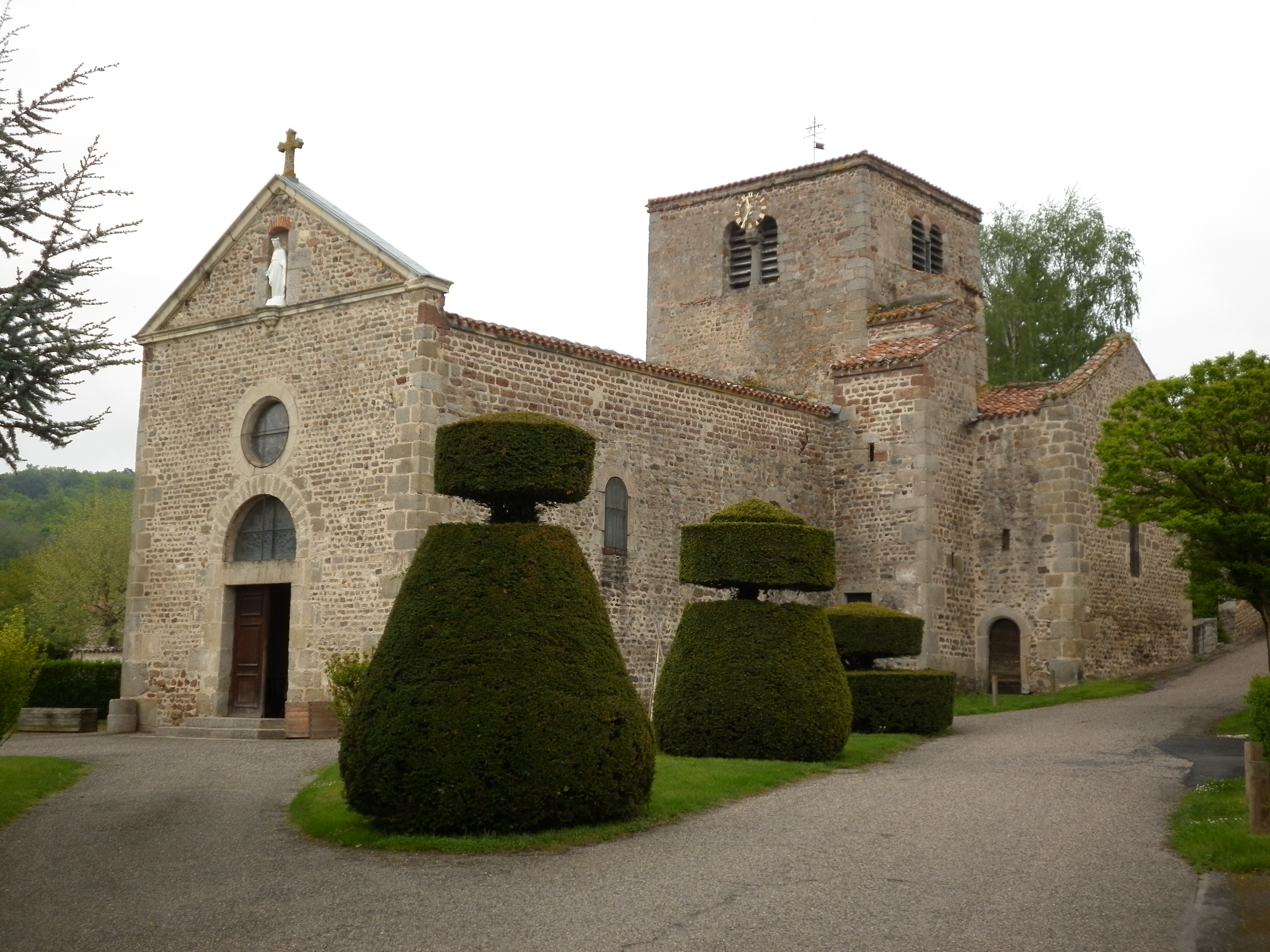
- Location of Salt-en-Donzy
- Location within France Location within Auvergne-Rhône-Alpes
- Coordinates: 45°44′18″N 4°17′23″E
- Country: France
- Region: Auvergne-Rhône-Alpes
- Department: Loire
- Arrondissement: Montbrison
- Canton: Feurs

Government
  - Mayor (2020–2026): Jean-Luc Laval
- Area^{1}: 8.93 km^{2} (3.45 sq mi)
- Elevation: 380 m (1,250 ft)
- Highest elevation: 490 m (1,610 ft)
- Lowest elevation: 346 m (1,135 ft)
- Population (2023): 535
  - Density: 59.9/km^{2} (155/sq mi)
- Time zone: UTC+01:00 (CET)
  - Summer (DST): UTC+02:00 (CEST)
- INSEE/Postal code: 42296 /42110
- ^{1} French Land Register data, which excludes lakes, ponds, glaciers > 1 km^{2} (0.386 sq mi or 247 acres) and river estuaries.

Salt-en-Donzy (French pronunciation: [salt ɑ̃ dɔ̃zi]) is a commune in the Loire department in central France.

== Population ==
Historical population
| Year | Pop. | ±% p.a. |
|---|---|---|
| 1968 | 278 | — |
| 1975 | 346 | +3.18% |
| 1982 | 374 | +1.12% |
| 1990 | 412 | +1.22% |
| 1999 | 393 | −0.52% |
| 2007 | 469 | +2.23% |
| 2012 | 539 | +2.82% |
| 2017 | 544 | +0.18% |
| 2023 | 535 | −0.28% |
Source: INSEE

== See also ==
- Communes of the Loire department
