= Cottance =

- Commune
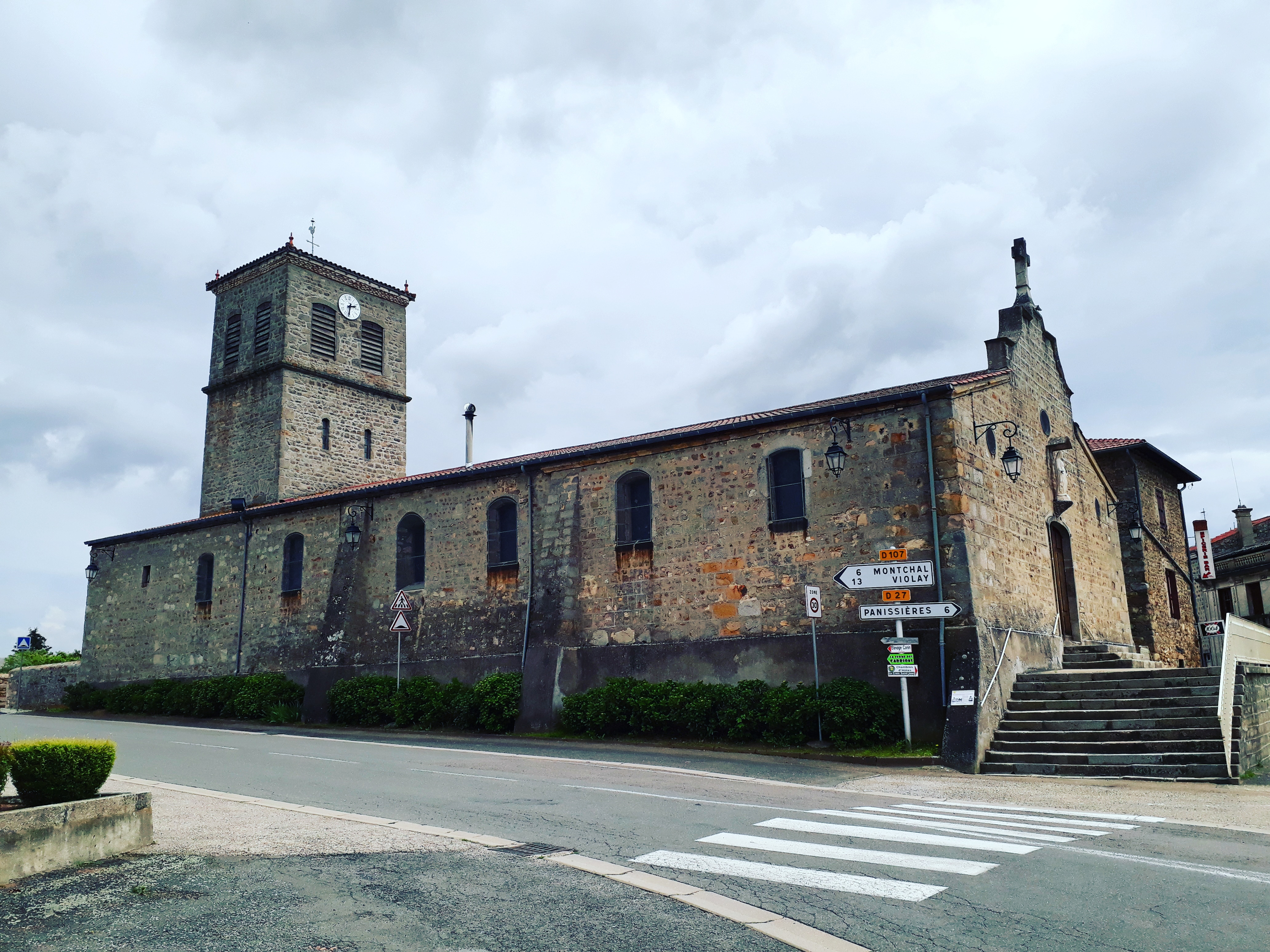

- Coat of arms
- Location of Cottance
- Location within France Location within Auvergne-Rhône-Alpes
- Coordinates: 45°47′39″N 4°17′59″E
- Country: France
- Region: Auvergne-Rhône-Alpes
- Department: Loire
- Arrondissement: Montbrison
- Canton: Feurs

Government
  - Mayor (2020–2026): Jacques de Lemps
- Area^{1}: 13.55 km^{2} (5.23 sq mi)
- Elevation: 493 m (1,617 ft)
- Highest elevation: 656 m (2,152 ft)
- Lowest elevation: 403 m (1,322 ft)
- Population (2023): 755
  - Density: 55.7/km^{2} (144/sq mi)
- Time zone: UTC+01:00 (CET)
  - Summer (DST): UTC+02:00 (CEST)
- INSEE/Postal code: 42073 /42360
- ^{1} French Land Register data, which excludes lakes, ponds, glaciers > 1 km^{2} (0.386 sq mi or 247 acres) and river estuaries.

Cottance (French pronunciation: [kɔtɑ̃s]) is a commune in the Loire department in central France.

== Population ==
Historical population
Year	Pop.	±% p.a.
1968	668	—
1975	533	−3.17%
1982	499	−0.94%
1990	487	−0.30%
1999	551	+1.38%
2007	625	+1.59%
2012	672	+1.46%
2017	719	+1.36%
2023	755	+0.82%
Source: INSEE

== See also ==
- Communes of the Loire department
