= Saint-Barthélemy-Lestra =

- Commune
- Location of Saint-Barthélemy-Lestra
- Location within France Location within Auvergne-Rhône-Alpes
- Coordinates: 45°43′13″N 4°20′27″E
- Country: France
- Region: Auvergne-Rhône-Alpes
- Department: Loire
- Arrondissement: Montbrison
- Canton: Feurs

Government
  - Mayor (2020–2026): Pierre Simone
- Area^{1}: 11.06 km^{2} (4.27 sq mi)
- Elevation: 550 m (1,800 ft)
- Highest elevation: 593 m (1,946 ft)
- Lowest elevation: 371 m (1,217 ft)
- Population (2023): 679
  - Density: 61.4/km^{2} (159/sq mi)
- Time zone: UTC+01:00 (CET)
  - Summer (DST): UTC+02:00 (CEST)
- INSEE/Postal code: 42202 /42110
- ^{1} French Land Register data, which excludes lakes, ponds, glaciers > 1 km^{2} (0.386 sq mi or 247 acres) and river estuaries.

Saint-Barthélemy-Lestra is a commune in the Loire department in central France.

== Population ==
Historical population
Year	Pop.	±% p.a.
1968	512	—
1975	493	−0.54%
1982	476	−0.50%
1990	533	+1.42%
1999	582	+0.98%
2007	682	+2.00%
2012	675	−0.21%
2017	684	+0.27%
2023	679	−0.12%
Source: INSEE

== See also ==
- Communes of the Loire department
