= Rozier-en-Donzy =

- Commune
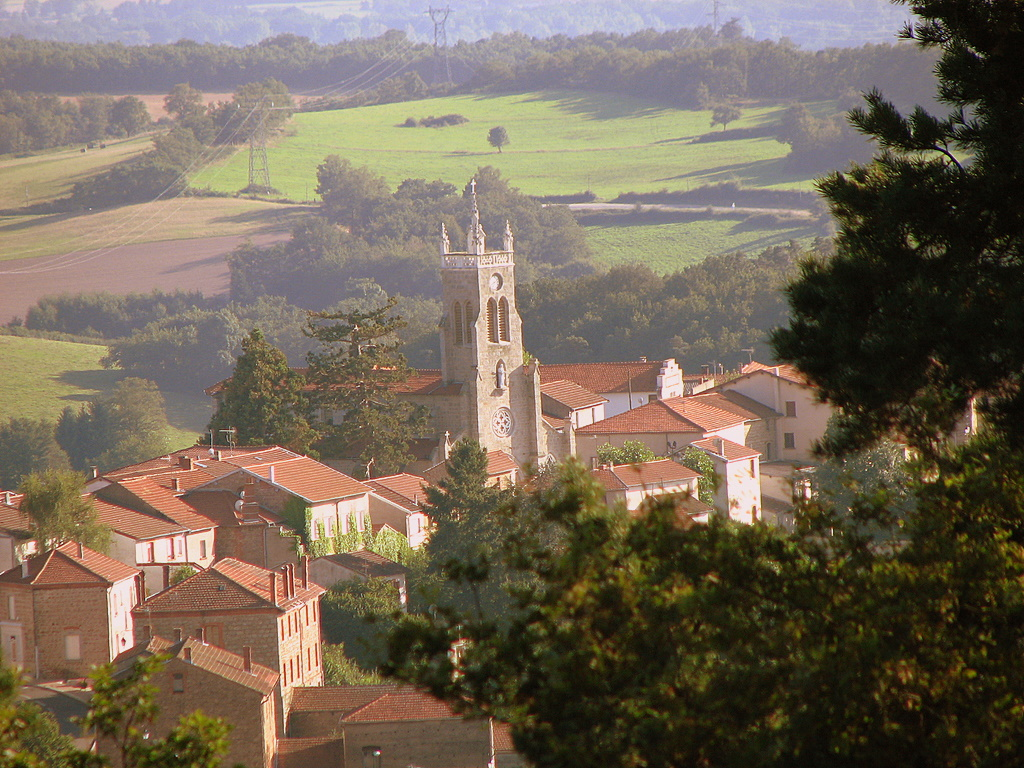

- Coat of arms
- Location of Rozier-en-Donzy
- Location within France Location within Auvergne-Rhône-Alpes
- Coordinates: 45°47′56″N 4°16′43″E
- Country: France
- Region: Auvergne-Rhône-Alpes
- Department: Loire
- Arrondissement: Montbrison
- Canton: Feurs

Government
  - Mayor (2020–2026): Didier Berne
- Area^{1}: 9.51 km^{2} (3.67 sq mi)
- Highest elevation: 682 m (2,238 ft)
- Lowest elevation: 380 m (1,250 ft)
- Population (2023): 1,456
  - Density: 153/km^{2} (397/sq mi)
- Time zone: UTC+01:00 (CET)
  - Summer (DST): UTC+02:00 (CEST)
- INSEE/Postal code: 42193 /42810
- ^{1} French Land Register data, which excludes lakes, ponds, glaciers > 1 km^{2} (0.386 sq mi or 247 acres) and river estuaries.

Rozier-en-Donzy (French pronunciation: [ʁozje ɑ̃ dɔ̃zi]) is a commune in the Loire department in central France.

== Population ==
Historical population
Year	Pop.	±% p.a.
1968	1,303	—
1975	1,165	−1.59%
1982	1,172	+0.09%
1990	1,146	−0.28%
1999	1,268	+1.13%
2007	1,354	+0.82%
2012	1,378	+0.35%
2017	1,444	+0.94%
2023	1,456	+0.14%
Source: INSEE

== See also ==
- Communes of the Loire department
