= Marclopt =

- Commune
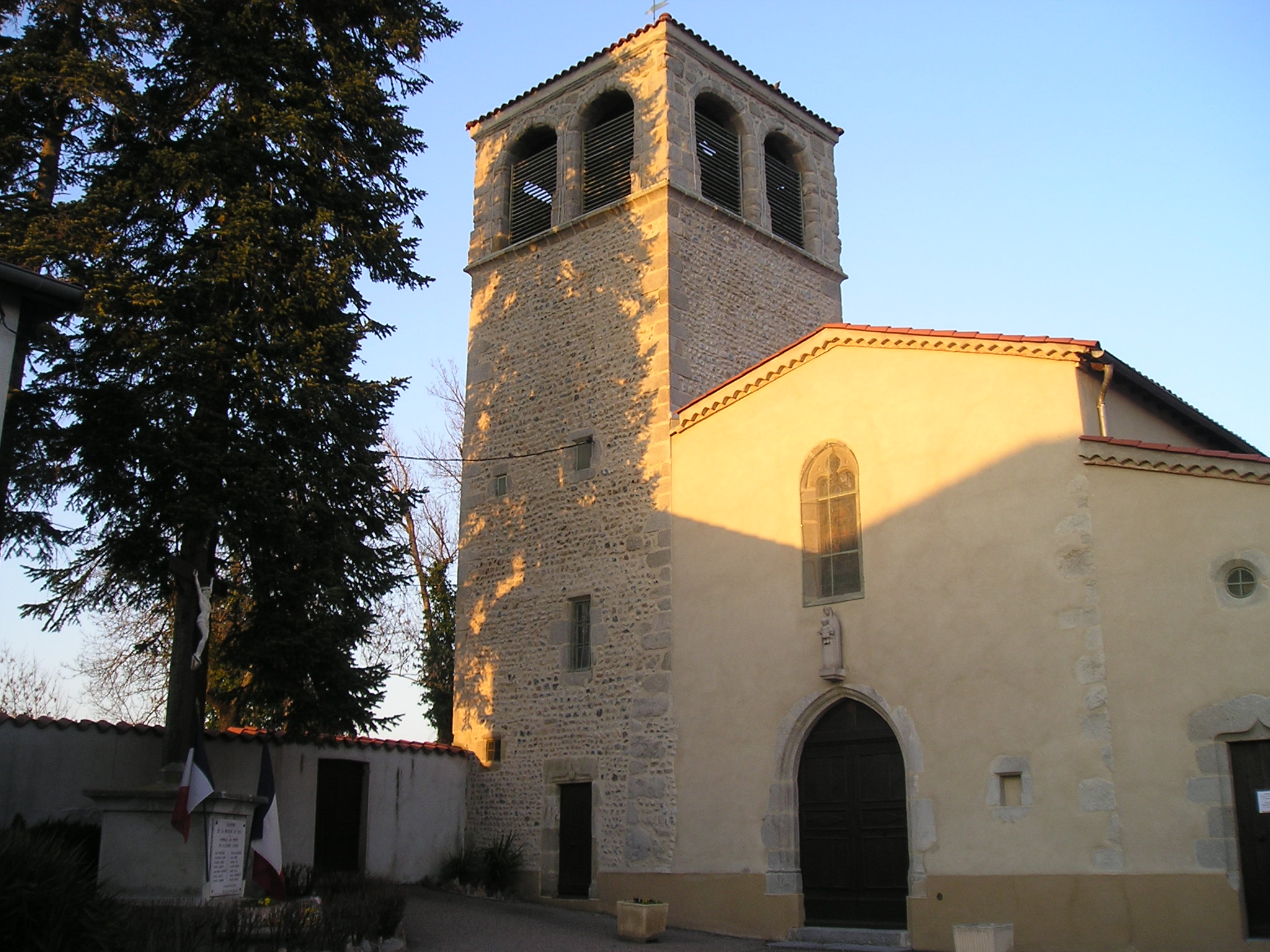

- Coat of arms
- Location of Marclopt
- Location within France Location within Auvergne-Rhône-Alpes
- Coordinates: 45°39′57″N 4°12′37″E
- Country: France
- Region: Auvergne-Rhône-Alpes
- Department: Loire
- Arrondissement: Montbrison
- Canton: Feurs
- Intercommunality: Forez-Est

Government
  - Mayor (2020–2026): Catherine Eyraud
- Area^{1}: 8.43 km^{2} (3.25 sq mi)
- Elevation: 352 m (1,155 ft)
- Highest elevation: 363 m (1,191 ft)
- Lowest elevation: 335 m (1,099 ft)
- Population (2023): 552
  - Density: 65.5/km^{2} (170/sq mi)
- Time zone: UTC+01:00 (CET)
  - Summer (DST): UTC+02:00 (CEST)
- INSEE/Postal code: 42135 /42210
- ^{1} French Land Register data, which excludes lakes, ponds, glaciers > 1 km^{2} (0.386 sq mi or 247 acres) and river estuaries.

Marclopt (French pronunciation: [maʁklo]) is a commune in the Loire department in central France.

== Population ==
Historical population
Year	Pop.	±% p.a.
1968	184	—
1975	196	+0.91%
1982	258	+4.00%
1990	288	+1.38%
1999	359	+2.48%
2007	483	+3.78%
2012	501	+0.73%
2017	503	+0.08%
2023	552	+1.56%
Source: INSEE

== See also ==
- Communes of the Loire department
