= Chambéon =

- Commune
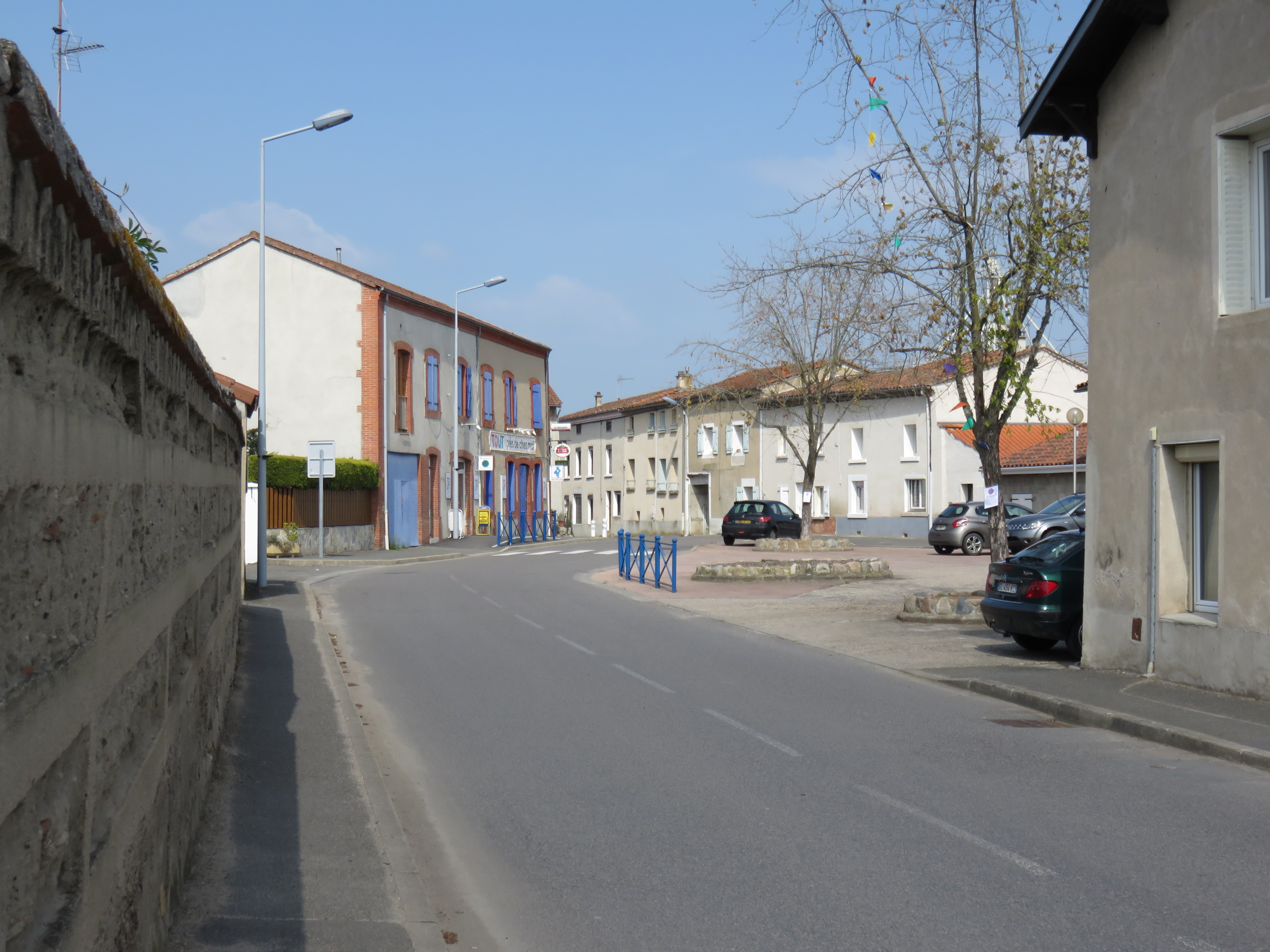

- Coat of arms
- Location of Chambéon
- Location within France Location within Auvergne-Rhône-Alpes
- Coordinates: 45°41′52″N 4°10′38″E
- Country: France
- Region: Auvergne-Rhône-Alpes
- Department: Loire
- Arrondissement: Montbrison
- Canton: Feurs

Government
  - Mayor (2020–2026): Patrick Mathieu
- Area^{1}: 16.85 km^{2} (6.51 sq mi)
- Elevation: 346 m (1,135 ft)
- Highest elevation: 388 m (1,273 ft)
- Lowest elevation: 331 m (1,086 ft)
- Population (2023): 665
  - Density: 39.5/km^{2} (102/sq mi)
- Time zone: UTC+01:00 (CET)
  - Summer (DST): UTC+02:00 (CEST)
- INSEE/Postal code: 42041 /42110
- ^{1} French Land Register data, which excludes lakes, ponds, glaciers > 1 km^{2} (0.386 sq mi or 247 acres) and river estuaries.

Chambéon (French pronunciation: [ʃɑ̃beɔ̃]) is a commune in the Loire department in central France.

== Population ==
Historical population
Year	Pop.	±% p.a.
1968	357	—
1975	250	−4.96%
1982	281	+1.68%
1990	360	+3.15%
1999	369	+0.27%
2007	452	+2.57%
2012	504	+2.20%
2017	562	+2.20%
2023	665	+2.84%
Source: INSEE

== See also ==
- Communes of the Loire department
