= Saint-Cyr-les-Vignes =

- Commune
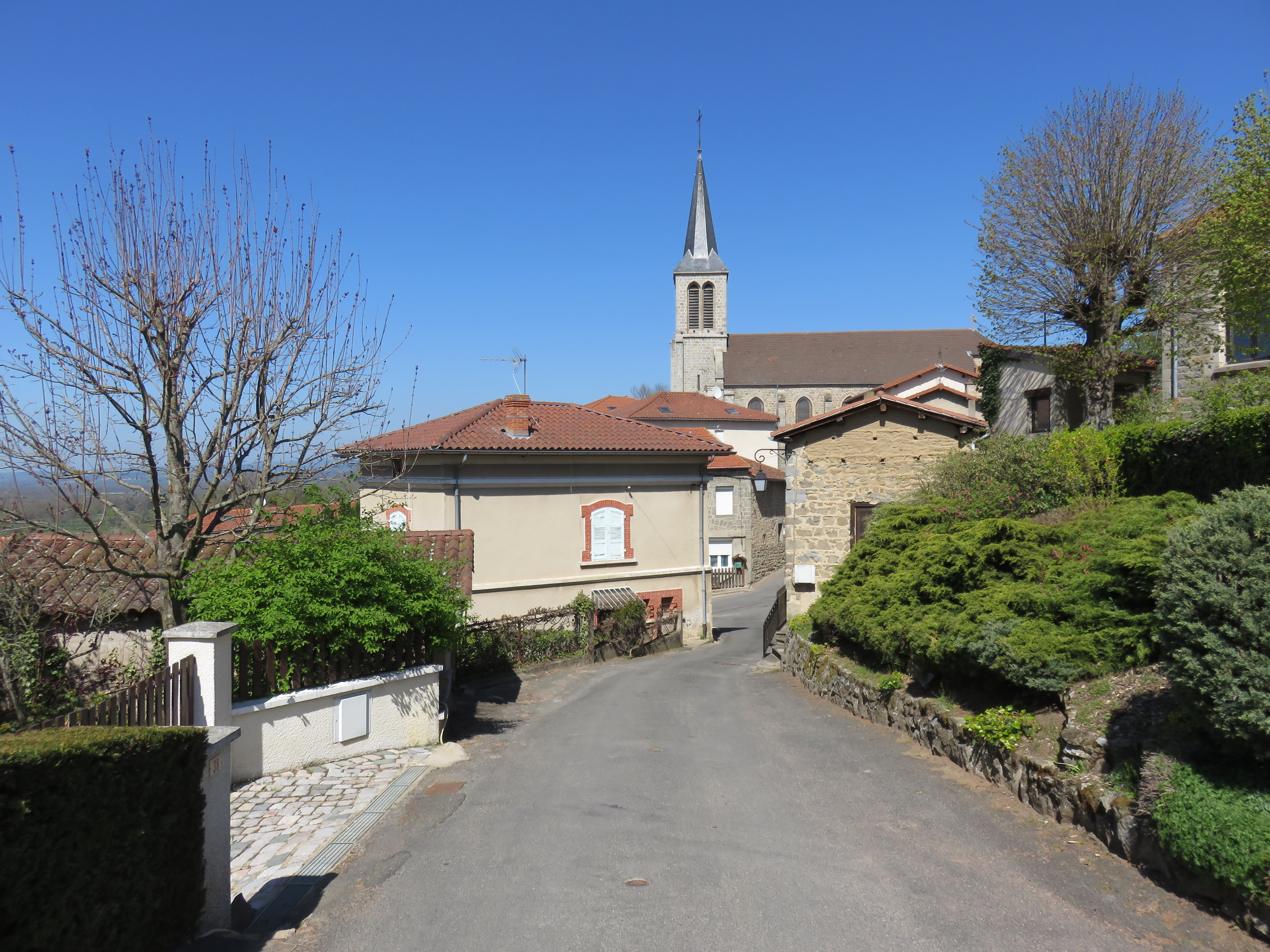
- Location of Saint-Cyr-les-Vignes
- Location within France Location within Auvergne-Rhône-Alpes
- Coordinates: 45°40′41″N 4°18′03″E
- Country: France
- Region: Auvergne-Rhône-Alpes
- Department: Loire
- Arrondissement: Montbrison
- Canton: Feurs

Government
  - Mayor (2020–2026): Gilles Court
- Area^{1}: 19.38 km^{2} (7.48 sq mi)
- Elevation: 440 m (1,440 ft)
- Highest elevation: 595 m (1,952 ft)
- Lowest elevation: 357 m (1,171 ft)
- Population (2023): 1,096
  - Density: 56.55/km^{2} (146.5/sq mi)
- Time zone: UTC+01:00 (CET)
  - Summer (DST): UTC+02:00 (CEST)
- INSEE/Postal code: 42214 /42210
- ^{1} French Land Register data, which excludes lakes, ponds, glaciers > 1 km^{2} (0.386 sq mi or 247 acres) and river estuaries.

Saint-Cyr-les-Vignes (French pronunciation: [sɛ̃ siʁ le viɲ]) is a commune in the Loire department in central France.

== Population ==
Historical population
Year	Pop.	±% p.a.
1968	625	—
1975	552	−1.76%
1982	553	+0.03%
1990	643	+1.90%
1999	789	+2.30%
2007	931	+2.09%
2012	928	−0.06%
2017	1,042	+2.34%
2023	1,096	+0.85%
Source: INSEE

== See also ==
- Communes of the Loire department
