= Saint-Martin-Lestra =

- Commune
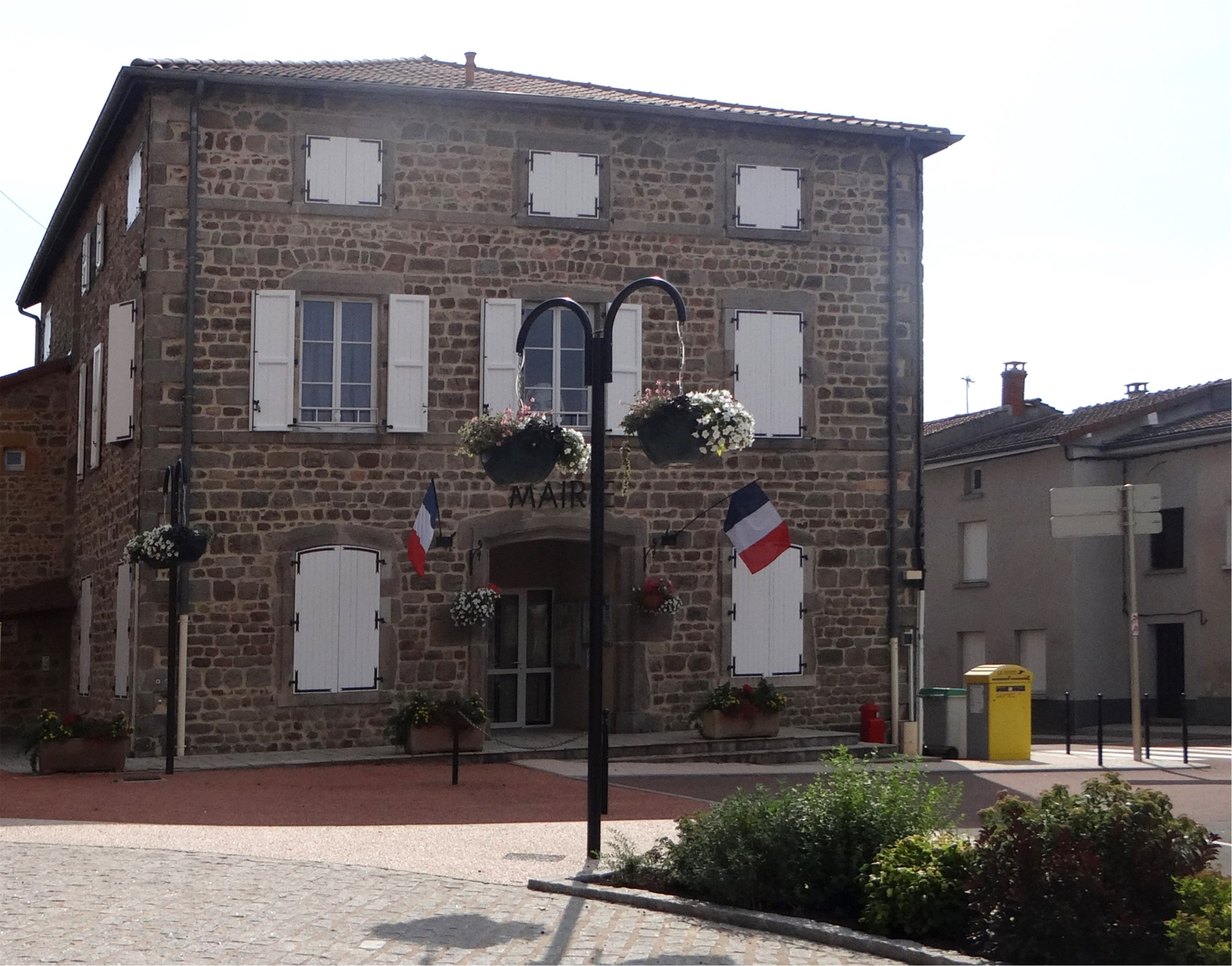
- Town hall
- Location of Saint-Martin-Lestra
- Location within France Location within Auvergne-Rhône-Alpes
- Coordinates: 45°43′18″N 4°21′19″E
- Country: France
- Region: Auvergne-Rhône-Alpes
- Department: Loire
- Arrondissement: Montbrison
- Canton: Feurs

Government
  - Mayor (2020–2026): Yves Grandrieux
- Area^{1}: 16.33 km^{2} (6.31 sq mi)
- Elevation: 590 m (1,940 ft)
- Highest elevation: 623 m (2,044 ft)
- Lowest elevation: 457 m (1,499 ft)
- Population (2023): 947
  - Density: 58.0/km^{2} (150/sq mi)
- Time zone: UTC+01:00 (CET)
  - Summer (DST): UTC+02:00 (CEST)
- INSEE/Postal code: 42261 /42110
- ^{1} French Land Register data, which excludes lakes, ponds, glaciers > 1 km^{2} (0.386 sq mi or 247 acres) and river estuaries.

Saint-Martin-Lestra (French pronunciation: [sɛ̃ maʁtɛ̃ lɛstʁa]) is a commune in the Loire department in central France.

== Population ==
Historical population
Year	Pop.	±% p.a.
1968	851	—
1975	738	−2.01%
1982	705	−0.65%
1990	604	−1.91%
1999	693	+1.54%
2007	847	+2.54%
2012	915	+1.56%
2017	895	−0.44%
2023	947	+0.95%
Source: INSEE

== See also ==
- Communes of the Loire department
