= Nervieux =

Nervieux Nèrvié (Arpitan)
- Commune
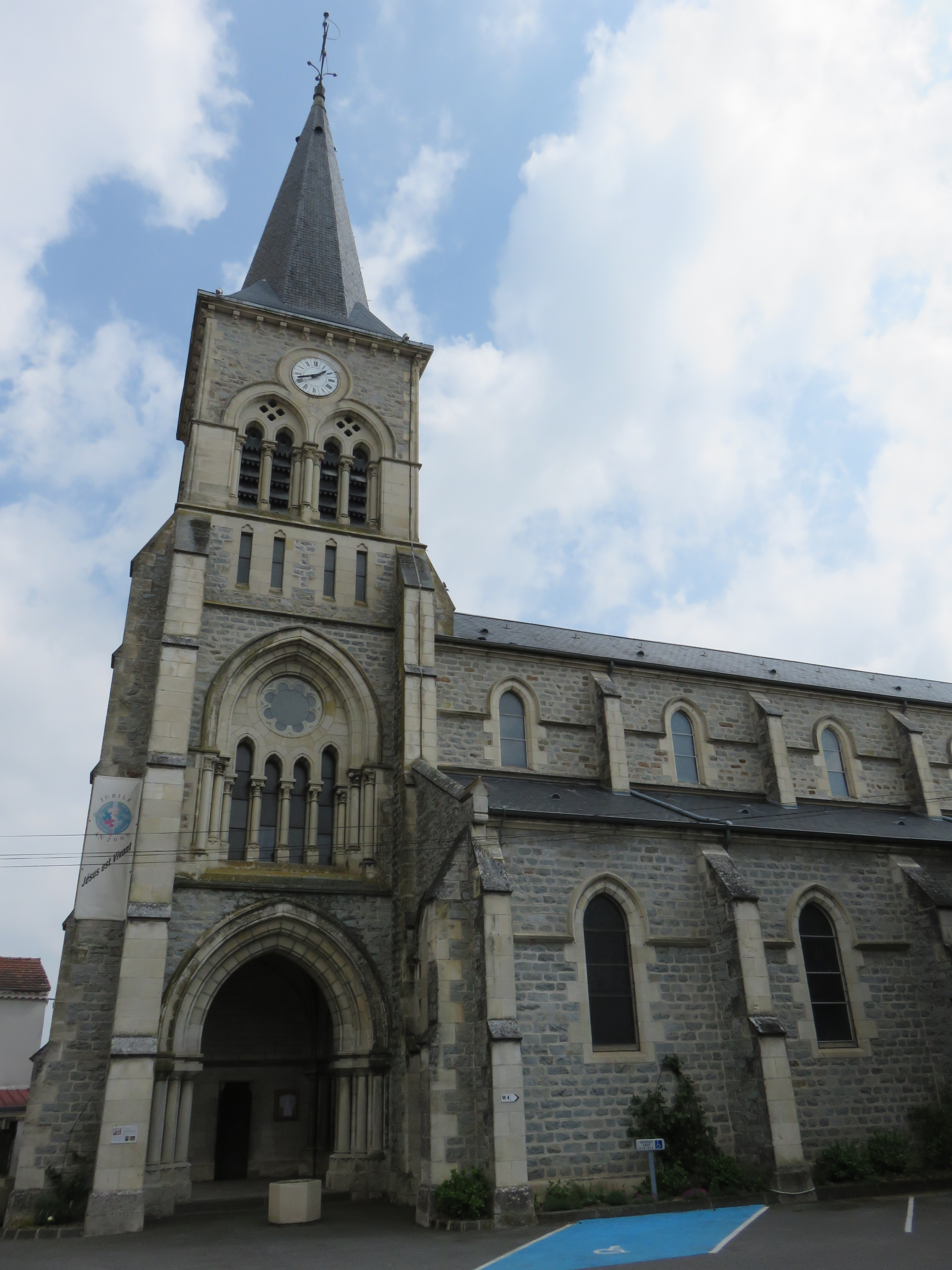

- Coat of arms
- Location of Nervieux
- Location within France Location within Auvergne-Rhône-Alpes
- Coordinates: 45°48′22″N 4°09′19″E
- Country: France
- Region: Auvergne-Rhône-Alpes
- Department: Loire
- Arrondissement: Montbrison
- Canton: Feurs

Government
  - Mayor (2020–2026): Jérôme Bruel
- Area^{1}: 19.44 km^{2} (7.51 sq mi)
- Elevation: 345 m (1,132 ft)
- Highest elevation: 385 m (1,263 ft)
- Lowest elevation: 315 m (1,033 ft)
- Population (2023): 1,040
  - Density: 53.5/km^{2} (139/sq mi)
- Time zone: UTC+01:00 (CET)
  - Summer (DST): UTC+02:00 (CEST)
- INSEE/Postal code: 42155 /42510
- ^{1} French Land Register data, which excludes lakes, ponds, glaciers > 1 km^{2} (0.386 sq mi or 247 acres) and river estuaries.

Nervieux (French pronunciation: [nɛʁvjø]; Arpitan: Nèrvié [naʁ.ˈvi]) is a commune in the Loire department in central France.

== Population ==
Historical population
Year	Pop.	±% p.a.
1968	754	—
1975	718	−0.70%
1982	706	−0.24%
1990	791	+1.43%
1999	785	−0.08%
2007	892	+1.61%
2012	943	+1.12%
2017	993	+1.04%
2023	1,040	+0.77%
Source: INSEE

== See also ==
- Communes of the Loire department
