= Mizérieux =

Mizérieux Méserié (Arpitan)
- Commune
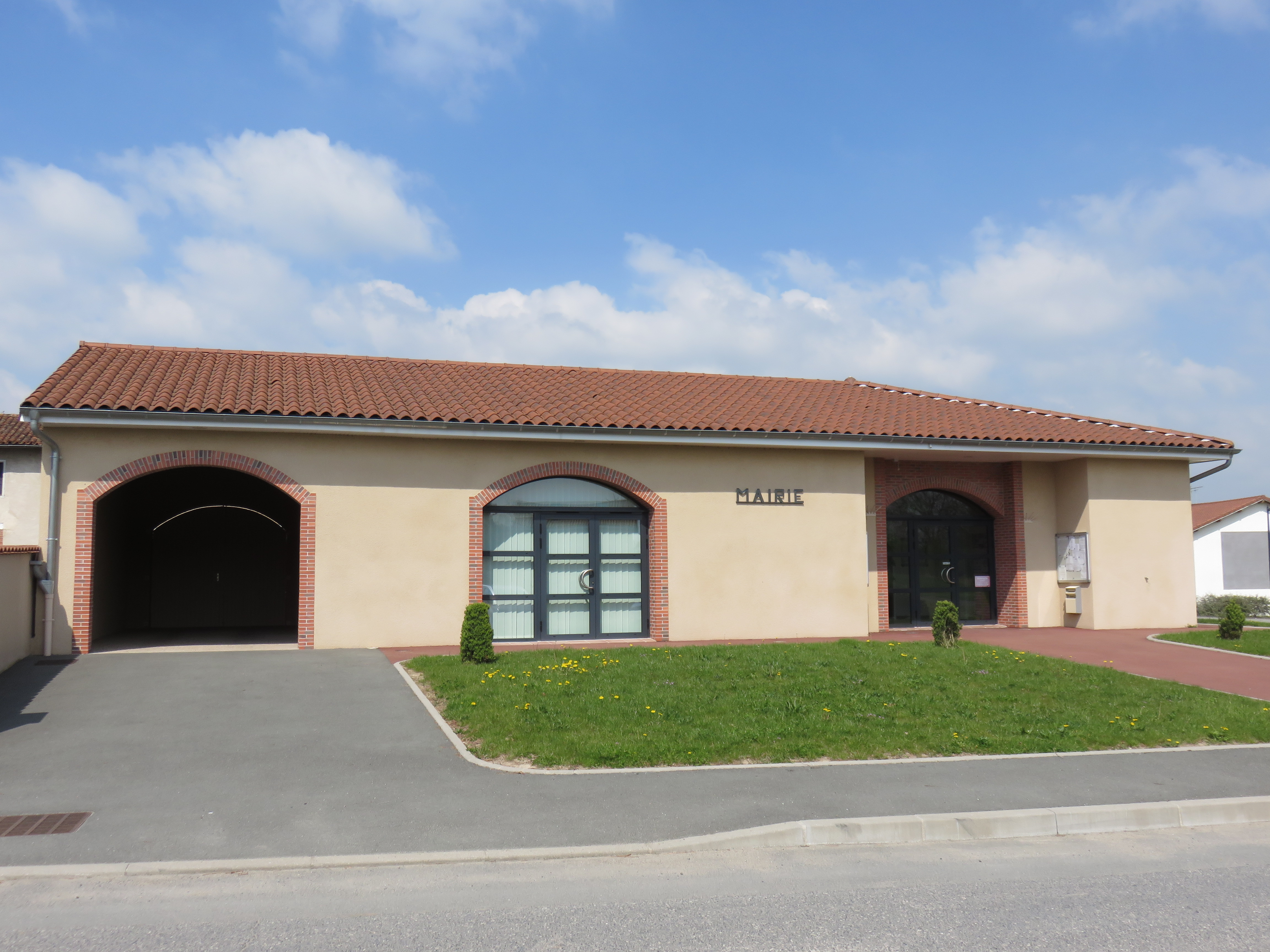
- Town hall

- Coat of arms
- Location of Mizérieux
- Location within France Location within Auvergne-Rhône-Alpes
- Coordinates: 45°47′45″N 4°09′57″E
- Country: France
- Region: Auvergne-Rhône-Alpes
- Department: Loire
- Arrondissement: Montbrison
- Canton: Feurs
- Intercommunality: Forez-Est

Government
  - Mayor (2020–2026): Laurent Thomas
- Area^{1}: 7.01 km^{2} (2.71 sq mi)
- Elevation: 340 m (1,120 ft)
- Highest elevation: 394 m (1,293 ft)
- Lowest elevation: 319 m (1,047 ft)
- Population (2023): 538
  - Density: 76.7/km^{2} (199/sq mi)
- Time zone: UTC+01:00 (CET)
  - Summer (DST): UTC+02:00 (CEST)
- INSEE/Postal code: 42143 /42110
- ^{1} French Land Register data, which excludes lakes, ponds, glaciers > 1 km^{2} (0.386 sq mi or 247 acres) and river estuaries.

Mizérieux (French pronunciation: [mizeʁjø]; Arpitan: Méserié [mi.zə.ˈri]) is a commune in the Loire department in central France.

== Population ==
Historical population
Year	Pop.	±% p.a.
1968	226	—
1975	226	+0.00%
1982	219	−0.45%
1990	245	+1.41%
1999	237	−0.37%
2007	303	+3.12%
2012	413	+6.39%
2017	453	+1.87%
2023	538	+2.91%
Source: INSEE

== See also ==
- Communes of the Loire department
