= Pouilly-lès-Feurs =

- Commune
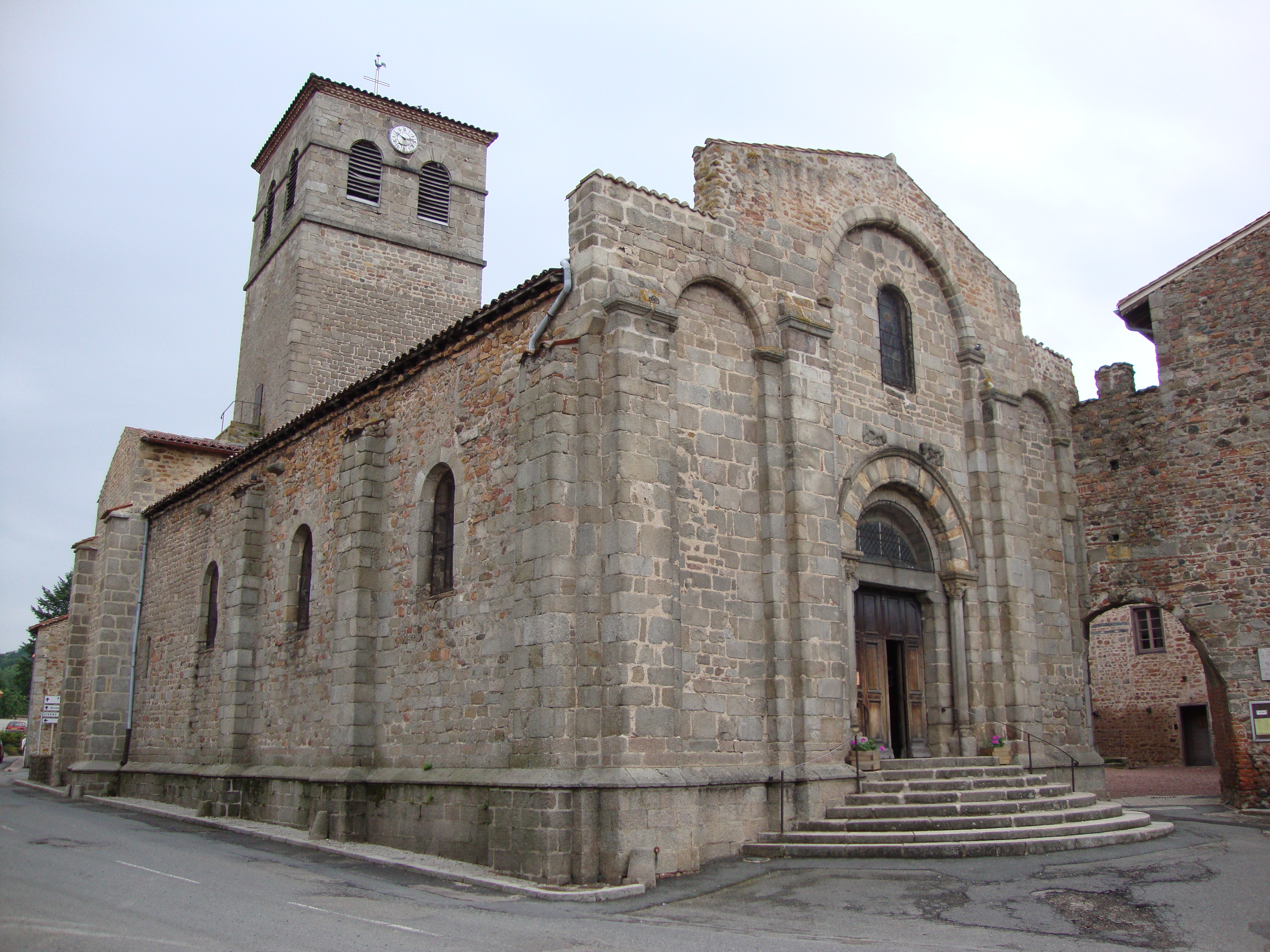

- Coat of arms
- Location of Pouilly-lès-Feurs
- Location within France Location within Auvergne-Rhône-Alpes
- Coordinates: 45°47′57″N 4°13′57″E
- Country: France
- Region: Auvergne-Rhône-Alpes
- Department: Loire
- Arrondissement: Montbrison
- Canton: Feurs

Government
  - Mayor (2020–2026): Jean-Yves Duron
- Area^{1}: 13.03 km^{2} (5.03 sq mi)
- Elevation: 362 m (1,188 ft)
- Highest elevation: 526 m (1,726 ft)
- Lowest elevation: 338 m (1,109 ft)
- Population (2023): 1,231
  - Density: 94.47/km^{2} (244.7/sq mi)
- Time zone: UTC+01:00 (CET)
  - Summer (DST): UTC+02:00 (CEST)
- INSEE/Postal code: 42175 /42110
- ^{1} French Land Register data, which excludes lakes, ponds, glaciers > 1 km^{2} (0.386 sq mi or 247 acres) and river estuaries.

Pouilly-lès-Feurs (French pronunciation: [puji lɛ fœʁ], literally Pouilly near Feurs) is a commune in the Loire department and in the Auvergne-Rhône-Alpes region in central France.

== Population ==
Historical population
Year	Pop.	±% p.a.
1968	842	—
1975	842	+0.00%
1982	953	+1.78%
1990	1,021	+0.87%
1999	989	−0.35%
2007	1,074	+1.04%
2012	1,196	+2.18%
2017	1,239	+0.71%
2023	1,231	−0.11%
Source: INSEE

== See also ==
- Communes of the Loire department
