= Civens =

- Commune
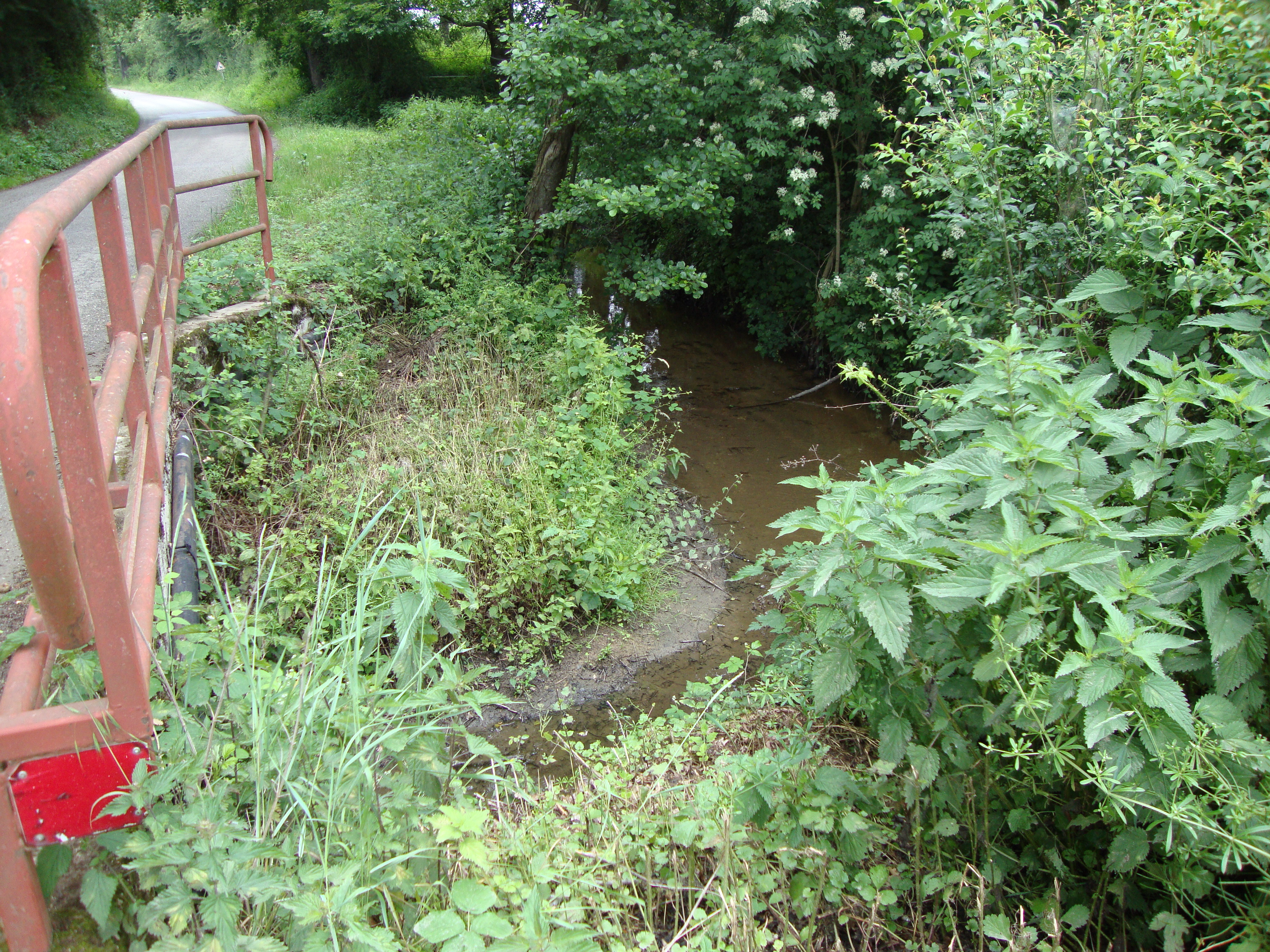
- Chanasson River

- Coat of arms
- Location of Civens
- Location within France Location within Auvergne-Rhône-Alpes
- Coordinates: 45°46′51″N 4°15′12″E
- Country: France
- Region: Auvergne-Rhône-Alpes
- Department: Loire
- Arrondissement: Montbrison
- Canton: Feurs

Government
  - Mayor (2020–2026): Christophe Guillarme
- Area^{1}: 13.1 km^{2} (5.1 sq mi)
- Elevation: 386 m (1,266 ft)
- Highest elevation: 470 m (1,540 ft)
- Lowest elevation: 327 m (1,073 ft)
- Population (2023): 1,468
  - Density: 112/km^{2} (290/sq mi)
- Time zone: UTC+01:00 (CET)
  - Summer (DST): UTC+02:00 (CEST)
- INSEE/Postal code: 42065 /42110
- ^{1} French Land Register data, which excludes lakes, ponds, glaciers > 1 km^{2} (0.386 sq mi or 247 acres) and river estuaries.

Civens (French pronunciation: [sivɛ̃s]) is a commune in the Loire department in central France.

== Population ==
Historical population
| Year | Pop. | ±% p.a. |
|---|---|---|
| 1968 | 523 | — |
| 1975 | 615 | +2.34% |
| 1982 | 761 | +3.09% |
| 1990 | 1,007 | +3.56% |
| 1999 | 1,129 | +1.28% |
| 2007 | 1,369 | +2.44% |
| 2012 | 1,373 | +0.06% |
| 2017 | 1,359 | −0.20% |
| 2023 | 1,468 | +1.29% |
Source: INSEE

== See also ==
- Communes of the Loire department
