= Épercieux-Saint-Paul =

Épercieux-Saint-Paul Èparcié-Sent-Pol (Arpitan)
- Commune
- Coat of arms
- Location of Épercieux-Saint-Paul
- Location within France Location within Auvergne-Rhône-Alpes
- Coordinates: 45°47′33″N 4°12′45″E
- Country: France
- Region: Auvergne-Rhône-Alpes
- Department: Loire
- Arrondissement: Montbrison
- Canton: Feurs
- Intercommunality: Forez-Est

Government
  - Mayor (2020–2026): Pierre Giroud
- Area^{1}: 7.92 km^{2} (3.06 sq mi)
- Elevation: 330 m (1,080 ft)
- Highest elevation: 344 m (1,129 ft)
- Lowest elevation: 319 m (1,047 ft)
- Population (2023): 732
  - Density: 92.4/km^{2} (239/sq mi)
- Time zone: UTC+01:00 (CET)
  - Summer (DST): UTC+02:00 (CEST)
- INSEE/Postal code: 42088 /42110
- ^{1} French Land Register data, which excludes lakes, ponds, glaciers > 1 km^{2} (0.386 sq mi or 247 acres) and river estuaries.

Épercieux-Saint-Paul (French pronunciation: [epɛʁsjø sɛ̃ pɔl]; Arpitan: Èparcié-Sent-Pol [e.par.ˈsi sẽ pwɔl]) is a commune in the Loire department in central France.

== Population ==
Historical population
Year	Pop.	±% p.a.
1968	366	—
1975	336	−1.21%
1982	374	+1.54%
1990	446	+2.23%
1999	543	+2.21%
2007	641	+2.10%
2012	676	+1.07%
2017	738	+1.77%
2023	732	−0.14%
Source: INSEE

== See also ==
- Communes of the Loire department
