= Virigneux =

- Commune
- Location of Virigneux
- Location within France Location within Auvergne-Rhône-Alpes
- Coordinates: 45°41′23″N 4°21′15″E
- Country: France
- Region: Auvergne-Rhône-Alpes
- Department: Loire
- Arrondissement: Montbrison
- Canton: Feurs
- Intercommunality: Monts du Lyonnais

Government
  - Mayor (2020–2026): Jean-Christophe Farjon
- Area^{1}: 11.84 km^{2} (4.57 sq mi)
- Highest elevation: 652 m (2,139 ft)
- Lowest elevation: 427 m (1,401 ft)
- Population (2023): 618
  - Density: 52.2/km^{2} (135/sq mi)
- Time zone: UTC+01:00 (CET)
  - Summer (DST): UTC+02:00 (CEST)
- INSEE/Postal code: 42336 /42140
- ^{1} French Land Register data, which excludes lakes, ponds, glaciers > 1 km^{2} (0.386 sq mi or 247 acres) and river estuaries.

Virigneux (French pronunciation: [viʁiɲø]) is a commune in the Loire department in central France.

== Population ==
Historical population
Year	Pop.	±% p.a.
1968	425	—
1975	388	−1.29%
1982	354	−1.30%
1990	366	+0.42%
1999	465	+2.70%
2007	563	+2.42%
2012	609	+1.58%
2017	631	+0.71%
2023	618	−0.35%
Source: INSEE

== See also ==
- Communes of the Loire department
