= Saint-Médard-en-Forez =

- Commune
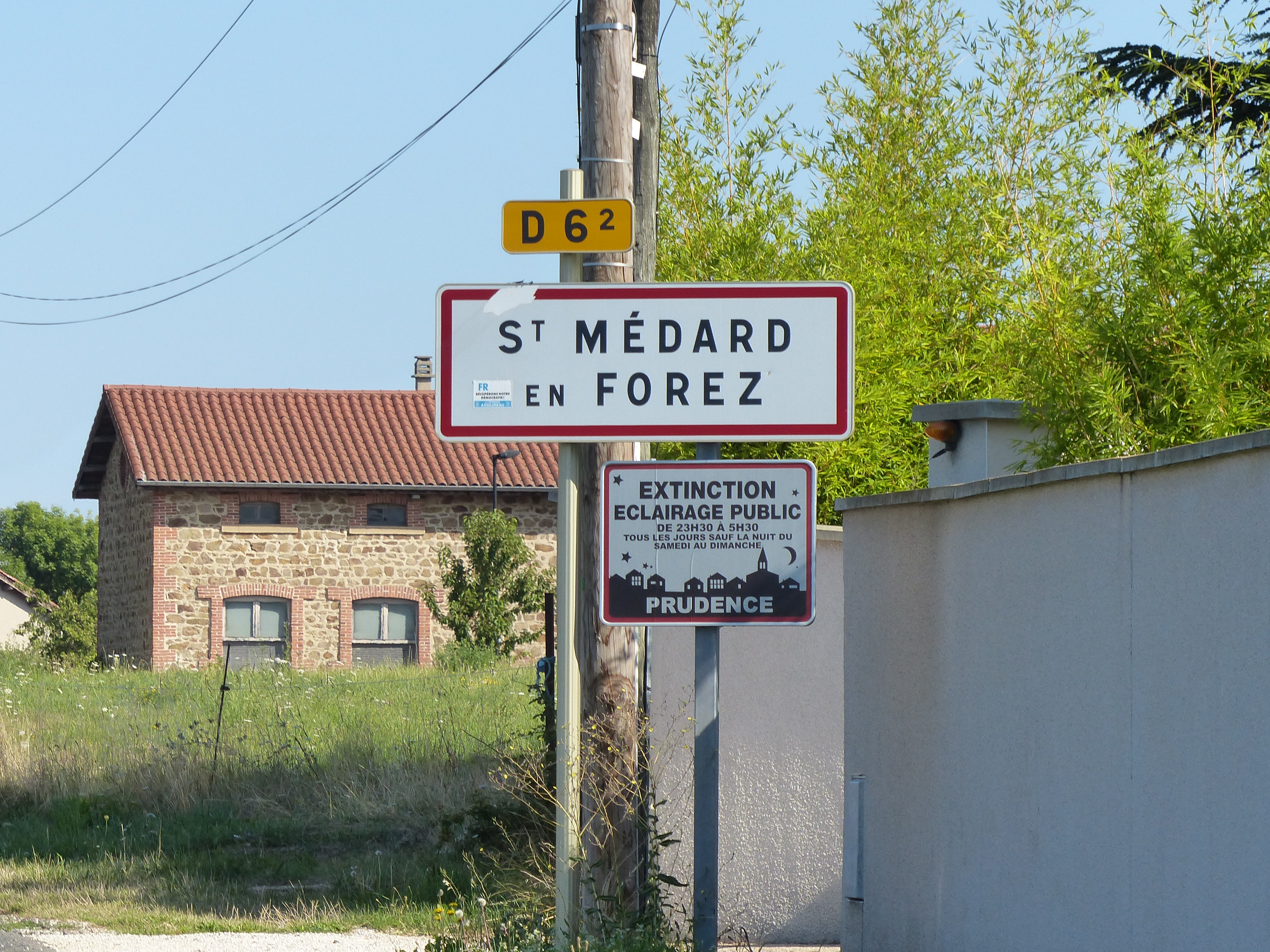

- Coat of arms
- Location of Saint-Médard-en-Forez
- Location within France Location within Auvergne-Rhône-Alpes
- Coordinates: 45°35′55″N 4°21′46″E
- Country: France
- Region: Auvergne-Rhône-Alpes
- Department: Loire
- Arrondissement: Montbrison
- Canton: Feurs

Government
  - Mayor (2020–2026): Sébastien Deshayes
- Area^{1}: 10.39 km^{2} (4.01 sq mi)
- Elevation: 554 m (1,818 ft)
- Highest elevation: 656 m (2,152 ft)
- Lowest elevation: 387 m (1,270 ft)
- Population (2023): 962
  - Density: 92.6/km^{2} (240/sq mi)
- Time zone: UTC+01:00 (CET)
  - Summer (DST): UTC+02:00 (CEST)
- INSEE/Postal code: 42264 /42330
- ^{1} French Land Register data, which excludes lakes, ponds, glaciers > 1 km^{2} (0.386 sq mi or 247 acres) and river estuaries.

Saint-Médard-en-Forez (French pronunciation: [sɛ̃ medaʁ ɑ̃ fɔʁɛ], literally Saint-Médard in Forez) is a commune in the Loire département in central France.

== Population ==
Historical population
Year	Pop.	±% p.a.
1968	409	—
1975	428	+0.65%
1982	582	+4.49%
1990	708	+2.48%
1999	806	+1.45%
2007	866	+0.90%
2012	1,004	+3.00%
2017	1,040	+0.71%
2023	962	−1.29%
Source: INSEE

== See also ==
- Communes of the Loire department
