= La Gimond =

- Commune
- Location of La Gimond
- Location within France Location within Auvergne-Rhône-Alpes
- Coordinates: 45°33′28″N 4°24′38″E
- Country: France
- Region: Auvergne-Rhône-Alpes
- Department: Loire
- Arrondissement: Montbrison
- Canton: Feurs
- Intercommunality: Saint-Étienne Métropole

Government
  - Mayor (2020–2026): Pascal Gonon
- Area^{1}: 3.37 km^{2} (1.30 sq mi)
- Elevation: 680 m (2,230 ft)
- Highest elevation: 773 m (2,536 ft)
- Lowest elevation: 598 m (1,962 ft)
- Population (2023): 279
  - Density: 82.8/km^{2} (214/sq mi)
- Time zone: UTC+01:00 (CET)
  - Summer (DST): UTC+02:00 (CEST)
- INSEE/Postal code: 42100 /42140
- ^{1} French Land Register data, which excludes lakes, ponds, glaciers > 1 km^{2} (0.386 sq mi or 247 acres) and river estuaries.

La Gimond (French pronunciation: [la ʒimɔ̃]) is a commune in the Loire department in central France.

== Population ==
Historical population
Year	Pop.	±% p.a.
1968	168	—
1975	174	+0.50%
1982	197	+1.79%
1990	221	+1.45%
1999	217	−0.20%
2007	241	+1.32%
2012	291	+3.84%
2017	277	−0.98%
2023	279	+0.12%
Source: INSEE

== See also ==
- Communes of the Loire department
