= Châtelus, Loire =

Châtelus
- Commune
- Location of Châtelus
- Location within France Location within Auvergne-Rhône-Alpes
- Coordinates: 45°35′48″N 4°27′59″E
- Country: France
- Region: Auvergne-Rhône-Alpes
- Department: Loire
- Arrondissement: Montbrison
- Canton: Feurs
- Intercommunality: Monts du Lyonnais

Government
  - Mayor (2020–2026): Alain Viricel
- Area^{1}: 2.53 km^{2} (0.98 sq mi)
- Elevation: 692 m (2,270 ft)
- Highest elevation: 788 m (2,585 ft)
- Lowest elevation: 550 m (1,800 ft)
- Population (2023): 143
  - Density: 56.5/km^{2} (146/sq mi)
- Time zone: UTC+01:00 (CET)
  - Summer (DST): UTC+02:00 (CEST)
- INSEE/Postal code: 42055 /42140
- ^{1} French Land Register data, which excludes lakes, ponds, glaciers > 1 km^{2} (0.386 sq mi or 247 acres) and river estuaries.

Châtelus (French pronunciation: [ʃatly]) is a commune in the Loire department in central France.

== Population ==
Historical population
Year	Pop.	±% p.a.
1968	134	—
1975	106	−3.29%
1982	117	+1.42%
1990	106	−1.23%
1999	108	+0.21%
2007	120	+1.33%
2012	125	+0.82%
2017	137	+1.85%
2023	143	+0.72%
Source: INSEE

== See also ==
- Communes of the Loire department
