= Grammond =

- Commune
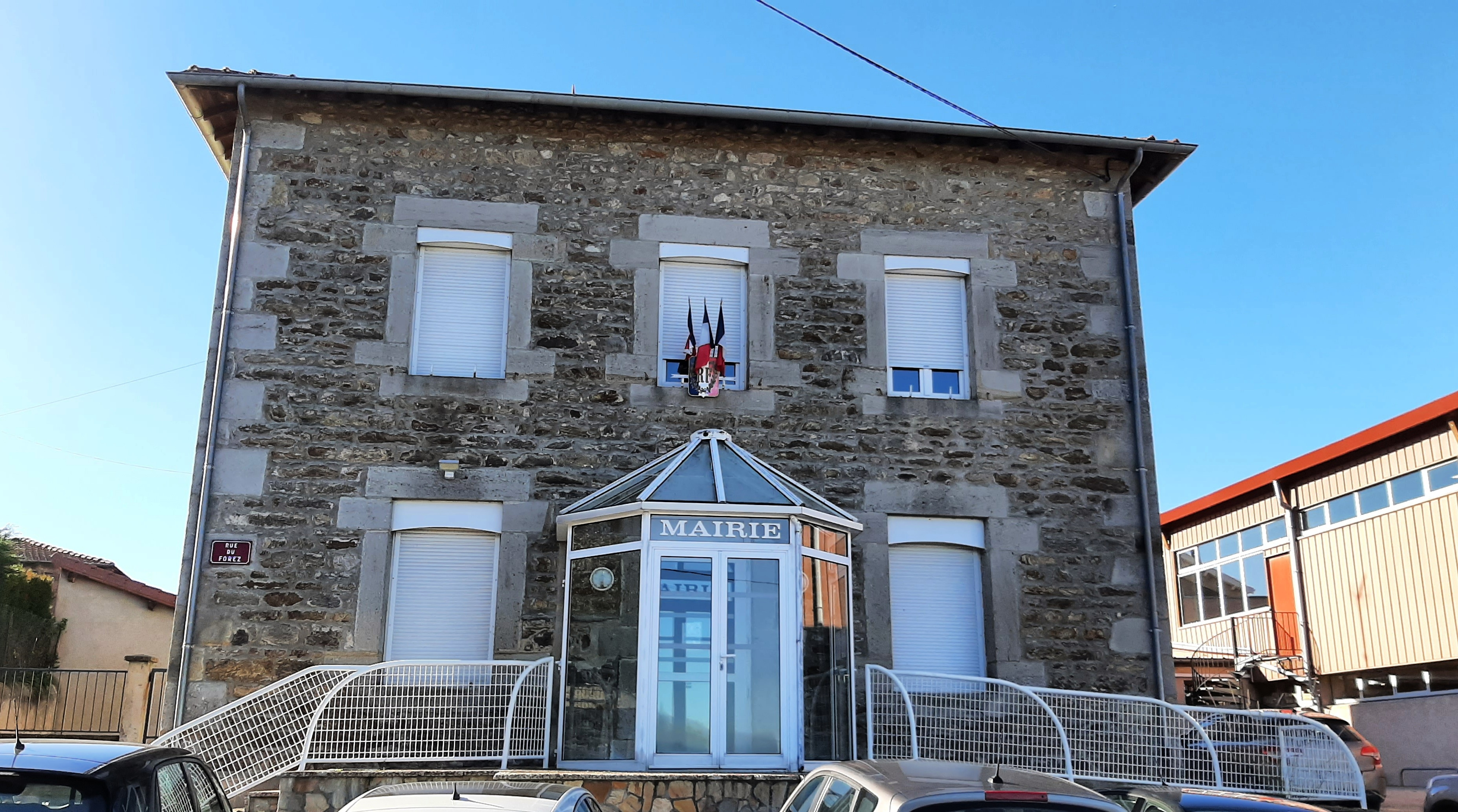
- Town hall
- Location of Grammond
- Location within France Location within Auvergne-Rhône-Alpes
- Coordinates: 45°33′58″N 4°26′31″E
- Country: France
- Region: Auvergne-Rhône-Alpes
- Department: Loire
- Arrondissement: Montbrison
- Canton: Feurs

Government
  - Mayor (2020–2026): Patrice Carteron
- Area^{1}: 8.13 km^{2} (3.14 sq mi)
- Elevation: 800 m (2,600 ft)
- Highest elevation: 885 m (2,904 ft)
- Lowest elevation: 599 m (1,965 ft)
- Population (2023): 887
  - Density: 109/km^{2} (283/sq mi)
- Time zone: UTC+01:00 (CET)
  - Summer (DST): UTC+02:00 (CEST)
- INSEE/Postal code: 42102 /42140
- ^{1} French Land Register data, which excludes lakes, ponds, glaciers > 1 km^{2} (0.386 sq mi or 247 acres) and river estuaries.

Grammond (French pronunciation: [ɡʁamɔ̃]) is a commune in the Loire department in central France.

== Population ==
Historical population
Year	Pop.	±% p.a.
1968	621	—
1975	616	−0.12%
1982	649	+0.75%
1990	684	+0.66%
1999	751	+1.04%
2007	799	+0.78%
2012	883	+2.02%
2017	906	+0.52%
2023	887	−0.35%
Source: INSEE

== See also ==
- Communes of the Loire department
