= Chevrières, Loire =

Chevrières
- Commune
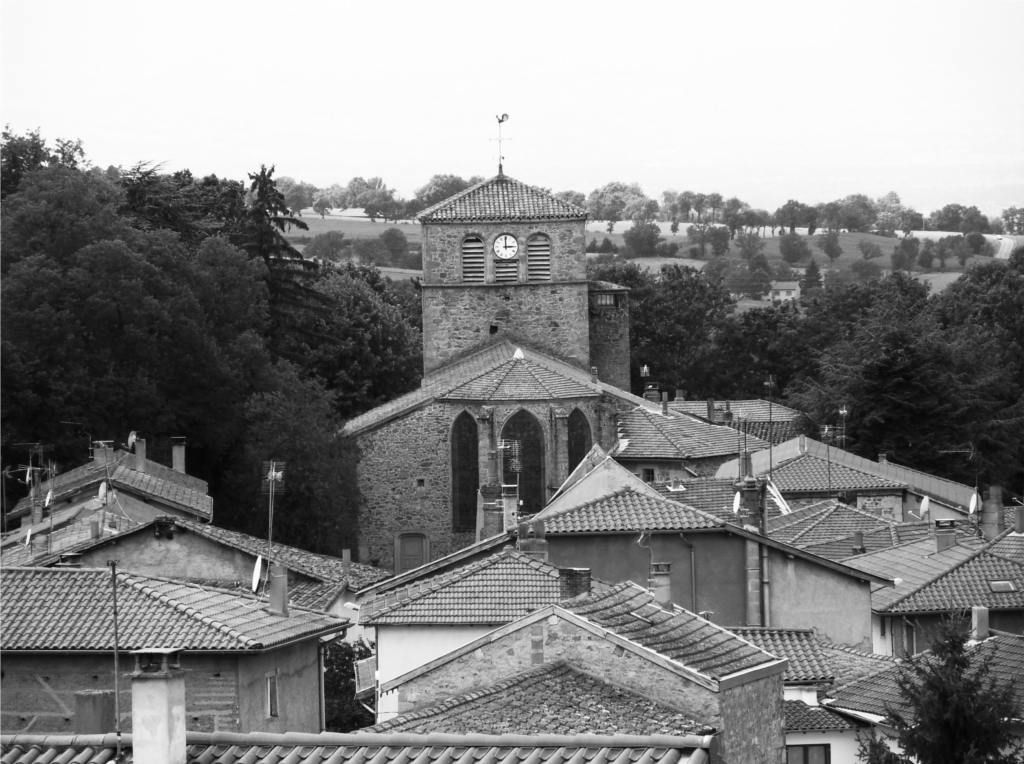
- The church and surrounding buildings in Chevrières

- Coat of arms
- Location of Chevrières
- Location within France Location within Auvergne-Rhône-Alpes
- Coordinates: 45°35′21″N 4°24′06″E
- Country: France
- Region: Auvergne-Rhône-Alpes
- Department: Loire
- Arrondissement: Montbrison
- Canton: Feurs
- Intercommunality: CC Monts du Lyonnais

Government
  - Mayor (2020–2026): Norbert Dupeyron
- Area^{1}: 14.54 km^{2} (5.61 sq mi)
- Elevation: 634 m (2,080 ft)
- Highest elevation: 770 m (2,530 ft)
- Lowest elevation: 426 m (1,398 ft)
- Population (2023): 1,150
  - Density: 79.1/km^{2} (205/sq mi)
- Time zone: UTC+01:00 (CET)
  - Summer (DST): UTC+02:00 (CEST)
- INSEE/Postal code: 42062 /42140
- ^{1} French Land Register data, which excludes lakes, ponds, glaciers > 1 km^{2} (0.386 sq mi or 247 acres) and river estuaries.

Chevrières (French pronunciation: [ʃəvʁijɛʁ]) is a commune in the Loire department in central France.

== See also ==
- Communes of the Loire department
