= Chazelles-sur-Lyon =

- Commune
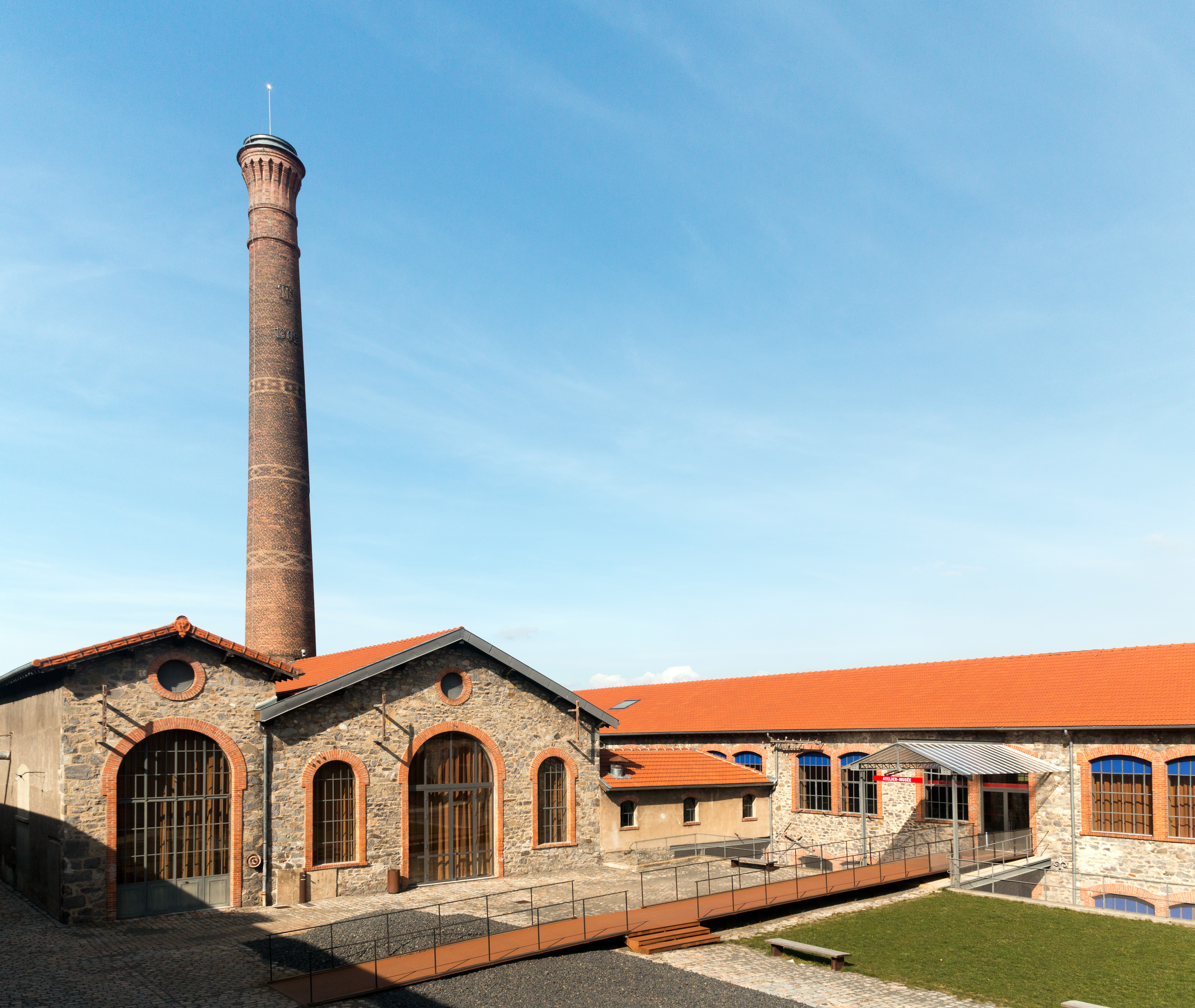
- La Chapellerie factory

- Coat of arms
- Location of Chazelles-sur-Lyon
- Location within France Location within Auvergne-Rhône-Alpes
- Coordinates: 45°38′22″N 4°23′33″E
- Country: France
- Region: Auvergne-Rhône-Alpes
- Department: Loire
- Arrondissement: Montbrison
- Canton: Feurs

Government
  - Mayor (2020–2026): Pierre Véricel
- Area^{1}: 20.91 km^{2} (8.07 sq mi)
- Elevation: 630 m (2,070 ft)
- Highest elevation: 631 m (2,070 ft)
- Lowest elevation: 414 m (1,358 ft)
- Population (2023): 5,543
  - Density: 265.1/km^{2} (686.6/sq mi)
- Time zone: UTC+01:00 (CET)
  - Summer (DST): UTC+02:00 (CEST)
- INSEE/Postal code: 42059 /42140
- ^{1} French Land Register data, which excludes lakes, ponds, glaciers > 1 km^{2} (0.386 sq mi or 247 acres) and river estuaries.

Chazelles-sur-Lyon (French pronunciation: [ʃazɛl syʁ ljɔ̃], literally Chazelles on Lyon) is a commune in the Loire department in central France.

== Population ==
Historical population

Year	Pop.	±% p.a.
1793	2,400	—
1800	2,364	−0.22%
1806	3,017	+4.15%
1821	3,071	+0.12%
1831	3,079	+0.03%
1836	2,822	−1.73%
1841	3,011	+1.30%
1846	3,086	+0.49%
1851	3,272	+1.18%
1856	4,011	+4.16%
1861	5,332	+5.86%
1866	5,688	+1.30%
1872	5,870	+0.53%
1876	5,915	+0.19%
1881	6,017	+0.34%
1886	5,567	−1.54%
1891	5,461	−0.38%
1896	5,607	+0.53%
1901	5,727	+0.42%

Year	Pop.	±% p.a.
1906	6,090	+1.24%
1911	6,041	−0.16%
1921	5,425	−1.07%
1926	5,774	+1.25%
1931	6,008	+0.80%
1936	6,003	−0.02%
1946	6,108	+0.17%
1954	5,902	−0.43%
1962	5,717	−0.40%
1968	5,546	−0.50%
1975	5,360	−0.49%
1982	5,021	−0.93%
1990	4,895	−0.32%
1999	4,801	−0.22%
2007	5,074	+0.69%
2012	5,137	+0.25%
2017	5,357	+0.84%
2023	5,543	+0.57%

Source: EHESS and INSEE (1968-2023)

== See also ==
- Communes of the Loire department
