= Maringes =

- Commune
- Location of Maringes
- Location within France Location within Auvergne-Rhône-Alpes
- Coordinates: 45°39′45″N 4°21′08″E
- Country: France
- Region: Auvergne-Rhône-Alpes
- Department: Loire
- Arrondissement: Montbrison
- Canton: Feurs
- Intercommunality: Monts du Lyonnais

Government
  - Mayor (2020–2026): François Dumont
- Area^{1}: 9.17 km^{2} (3.54 sq mi)
- Elevation: 610 m (2,000 ft)
- Highest elevation: 671 m (2,201 ft)
- Lowest elevation: 440 m (1,440 ft)
- Population (2023): 677
  - Density: 73.8/km^{2} (191/sq mi)
- Time zone: UTC+01:00 (CET)
  - Summer (DST): UTC+02:00 (CEST)
- INSEE/Postal code: 42138 /42140
- ^{1} French Land Register data, which excludes lakes, ponds, glaciers > 1 km^{2} (0.386 sq mi or 247 acres) and river estuaries.

Maringes (French pronunciation: [maʁɛ̃ʒ]) is a commune in the Loire department in central France. The mayor is François Dumont, elected in 2020.

== Population ==
Historical population
Year	Pop.	±% p.a.
1968	478	—
1975	434	−1.37%
1982	434	+0.00%
1990	464	+0.84%
1999	566	+2.23%
2007	605	+0.84%
2012	665	+1.91%
2017	666	+0.03%
2023	677	+0.27%
Source: INSEE

== See also ==
- Communes of the Loire department
