= Viricelles =

- Commune
- Coat of arms
- Location of Viricelles
- Location within France Location within Auvergne-Rhône-Alpes
- Coordinates: 45°39′12″N 4°22′36″E
- Country: France
- Region: Auvergne-Rhône-Alpes
- Department: Loire
- Arrondissement: Montbrison
- Canton: Feurs
- Intercommunality: Monts du Lyonnais

Government
  - Mayor (2020–2026): Raphaël Moreton
- Area^{1}: 2 km^{2} (0.77 sq mi)
- Elevation: 570 m (1,870 ft)
- Highest elevation: 593 m (1,946 ft)
- Lowest elevation: 477 m (1,565 ft)
- Population (2023): 449
  - Density: 220/km^{2} (580/sq mi)
- Time zone: UTC+01:00 (CET)
  - Summer (DST): UTC+02:00 (CEST)
- INSEE/Postal code: 42335 /42140
- ^{1} French Land Register data, which excludes lakes, ponds, glaciers > 1 km^{2} (0.386 sq mi or 247 acres) and river estuaries.

Viricelles (French pronunciation: [viʁisɛl]) is a commune in the Loire department in central France.

== Population ==
Historical population
Year	Pop.	±% p.a.
1968	216	—
1975	204	−0.81%
1982	237	+2.17%
1990	283	+2.24%
1999	333	+1.82%
2007	387	+1.90%
2012	442	+2.69%
2017	457	+0.67%
2023	449	−0.29%
Source: INSEE

== See also ==
- Communes of the Loire department
