= Saint-Denis-sur-Coise =

- Commune
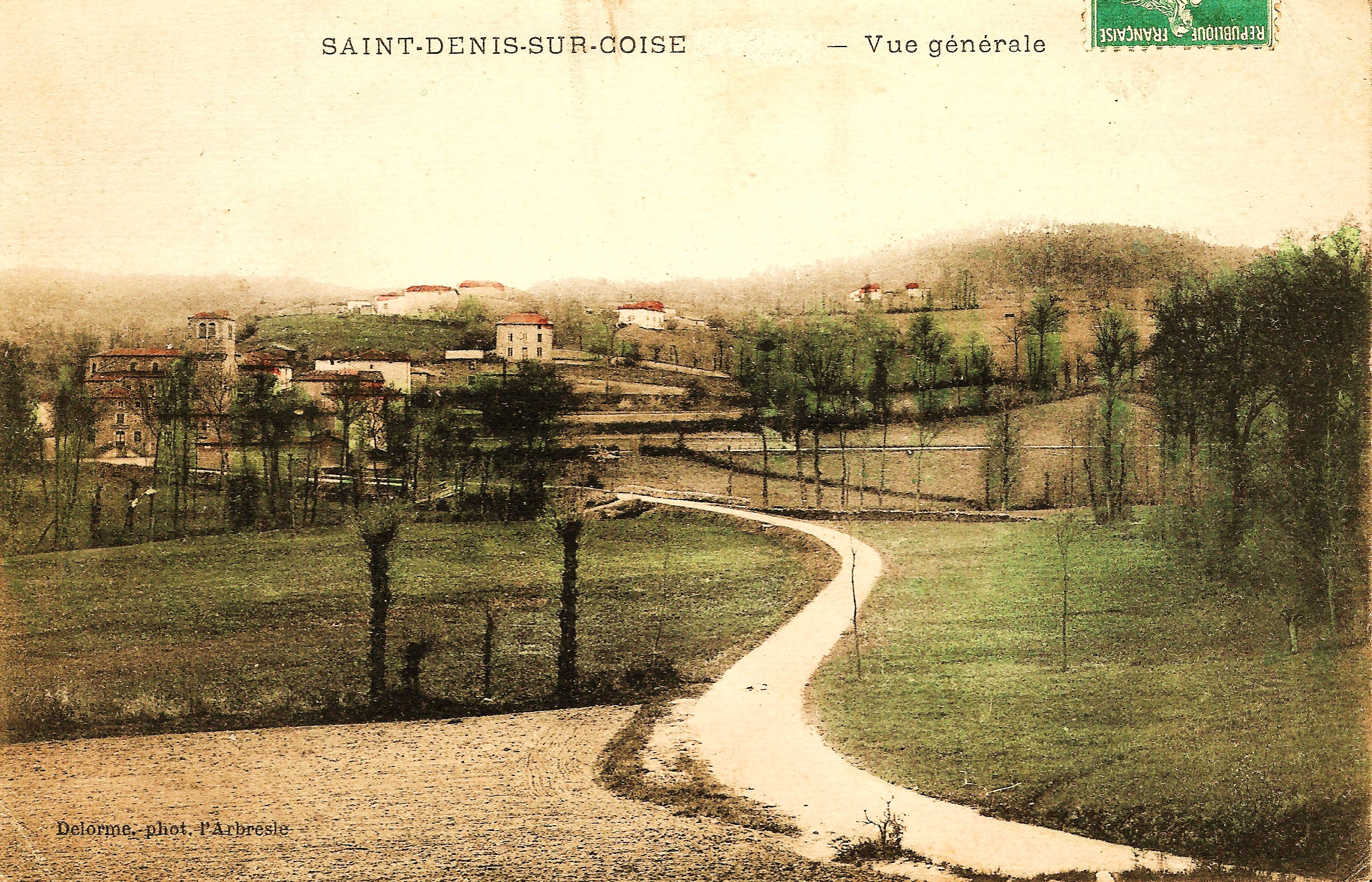
- Saint-Denis-sur-Coise, around 1910
- Location of Saint-Denis-sur-Coise
- Location within France Location within Auvergne-Rhône-Alpes
- Coordinates: 45°37′03″N 4°25′27″E
- Country: France
- Region: Auvergne-Rhône-Alpes
- Department: Loire
- Arrondissement: Montbrison
- Canton: Feurs
- Intercommunality: Monts du Lyonnais

Government
  - Mayor (2020–2026): Daniel Bonnier
- Area^{1}: 10.79 km^{2} (4.17 sq mi)
- Elevation: 495 m (1,624 ft)
- Highest elevation: 721 m (2,365 ft)
- Lowest elevation: 451 m (1,480 ft)
- Population (2023): 692
  - Density: 64.1/km^{2} (166/sq mi)
- Time zone: UTC+01:00 (CET)
  - Summer (DST): UTC+02:00 (CEST)
- INSEE/Postal code: 42216 /42140
- ^{1} French Land Register data, which excludes lakes, ponds, glaciers > 1 km^{2} (0.386 sq mi or 247 acres) and river estuaries.

Saint-Denis-sur-Coise (French pronunciation: [sɛ̃ dəni syʁ kwaz]) is a commune in the Loire department in central France.

== Population ==
Historical population
Year	Pop.	±% p.a.
1968	535	—
1975	500	−0.96%
1982	502	+0.06%
1990	512	+0.25%
1999	548	+0.76%
2007	569	+0.47%
2012	638	+2.32%
2017	657	+0.59%
2023	692	+0.87%
Source: INSEE

== See also ==
- Communes of the Loire department
