= Canton of Feurs =

Coordinates: 45.7515°N 4.2577°E

Feurs
- Canton
- Country: France
- Region: Auvergne-Rhône-Alpes
- Department: Loire
- No. of communes: {{{nbcomm}}}
- Area: 410.23 km^{2} (158.39 sq mi)
- Population (2023): 39,365
  - Density: 95.958/km^{2} (248.53/sq mi)
- INSEE code: 42 05

The canton of Feurs is a French administrative division located in the department of Loire and the Auvergne-Rhône-Alpes region. At the French canton reorganisation which came into effect in March 2015, the canton was expanded from 23 to 33 communes:

- Chambéon
- Châtelus
- Chazelles-sur-Lyon
- Chevrières
- Civens
- Cleppé
- Cottance
- Épercieux-Saint-Paul
- Essertines-en-Donzy
- Feurs
- La Gimond
- Grammond
- Jas
- Marclopt
- Maringes
- Mizérieux
- Montchal
- Nervieux
- Panissières
- Poncins
- Pouilly-lès-Feurs
- Rozier-en-Donzy
- Saint-Barthélemy-Lestra
- Saint-Cyr-les-Vignes
- Saint-Denis-sur-Coise
- Saint-Laurent-la-Conche
- Saint-Martin-Lestra
- Saint-Médard-en-Forez
- Salt-en-Donzy
- Salvizinet
- Valeille
- Viricelles
- Virigneux

== See also ==
- Cantons of the Loire department
