= Canton of Saint-Galmier =

Coordinates: 45.5911°N 4.2875°E

Saint-Galmier
- Former canton
- Interactive map of Saint-Galmier
- Country: France
- Region: Auvergne-Rhône-Alpes
- Department: Loire
- No. of communes: {{{nbcomm}}}
- Disbanded: 2015
- Area: 132.50 km^{2} (51.16 sq mi)
- Population (2012): 39,285
  - Density: 296.49/km^{2} (767.91/sq mi)

The canton of Saint-Galmier is a French former administrative division located in the department of Loire and the Rhône-Alpes region. It was disbanded following the French canton reorganisation which came into effect in March 2015. It consisted of 11 communes, which joined the new canton of Andrézieux-Bouthéon in 2015. It had 39,285 inhabitants (2012).

The canton comprised the following communes:

- Andrézieux-Bouthéon
- Aveizieux
- Bellegarde-en-Forez
- Chambœuf
- Cuzieu
- Montrond-les-Bains
- Rivas
- Saint-André-le-Puy
- Saint-Bonnet-les-Oules
- Saint-Galmier
- Veauche

== See also ==
- Cantons of the Loire department
