= List of most common surnames in North American countries =

This article contains lists of the most common surnames in some of the countries of North America, including one transcontinental country. Countries are arranged in alphabetical order.

== Canada ==
Top 10 common surnames in Canada
Rank	Surname	Number
1	Smith	192,145
2	Brown	108,859
3	Tremblay	106,668
4	Martin	91,680
5	Roy	90,417
6	Gagnon	85,120
7	Lee	83,424
8	Wilson	82,768
9	Johnson	79,492
10	MacDonald	78,766

=== By province ===
Region (year)	No. 1	No. 2	No. 3	No. 4	No. 5
British Columbia	Smith	Lee	Wong	Johnson	Brown
Alberta	Smith	Johnson	Anderson	Brown	Wilson
Saskatchewan	Smith	Johnson	Anderson	Brown	Miller
Manitoba	Friesen	Smith	Wiebe	Klassen	Penner
Ontario	Smith	Brown	Wilson	Lee	Martin
Quebec	Tremblay	Gagnon	Roy	Côté	Gauthier
New Brunswick	Leblanc	Cormier	Richard	Smith	Landry
Nova Scotia	MacDonald	Smith	Brown	Leblanc	MacNeil
Prince Edward Island	MacDonald	Gallant	Arsenault	Campbell	Smith
Newfoundland and Labrador	Power	Smith	White	Parsons	Walsh
Nunavut	Smith	Kilabuk	Gibbons	Nakoolak	Putulik
Northwest Territories	Smith	Brown	Lafferty	MacDonald	McLeod
Yukon	Smith	Johnson	Anderson	Brown	Taylor

=== Quebec ===
Top 10 common surnames in Quebec as of 2006.

Rank	Surname	% of pop
1	Tremblay	1.08%
2	Gagnon	0.790%
3	Roy	0.753%
4	Côté	0.624%
5	Bouchard	0.530%
6	Gauthier	0.522%
7	Morin	0.498%
8	Lavoie	0.458%
9	Fortin	0.449%
10	Gagné	0.448%

== Costa Rica ==
Most common surnames in Costa Rica as of 2007.

#	Surname	Persons	% of pop.
1	Hernández	—N/a	—N/a
2	Mora	—N/a	—N/a
3	Rodríguez	—N/a	—N/a
4	González	—N/a	—N/a
5	Jiménez	—N/a	—N/a
6	Morales	—N/a	—N/a
7	Sánchez	—N/a	—N/a
8	Ramírez	—N/a	—N/a
9	Pérez	—N/a	—N/a
10	Calderón	—N/a	—N/a
11	Gutiérrez	—N/a	—N/a
12	Rojas	—N/a	—N/a
13	Vargas	—N/a	—N/a
14	Torres	—N/a	—N/a
15	Salas	—N/a	—N/a
16	Segura	—N/a	—N/a
17	Valverde	—N/a	—N/a
18	Villalobos	—N/a	—N/a
19	Araya	—N/a	—N/a
20	Herrera	—N/a	—N/a
21	López	—N/a	—N/a
22	Madrigal	—N/a	—N/a
Total pop. (2008)		4,016,173	100.00

== Cuba ==
Most common surnames in Cuba.

Rank	Surname	Number
1	Rodríguez	301,136
2	Pérez	300,189
3	González	262,311
4	Hernández	215,593
5	García	208,965
6	Martínez	148,674
7	Díaz	136,364
8	Fernández	134,470
9	López	127,525
10	Álvarez	101,010

== Dominican Republic ==
#	Surname	Adults	% of adults	Origin
1	Rodríguez	225,321	—N/a	Spanish
2	Pérez	158,059	—N/a	Spanish
3	Martínez	141,259	—N/a	Spanish
4	García	137,124	—N/a	Spanish
5	Reyes	104,892	—N/a	Spanish
6	Sánchez	104,392	—N/a	Spanish
7	Díaz	95,106	—N/a	Spanish
8	Peña	94,396	—N/a	Spanish
9	Jiménez	92,978	—N/a	Spanish
10	Ramírez	92,863	—N/a	Spanish
11	Hernández	91,080	—N/a	Spanish
12	Rosario	89,630	—N/a	Spanish
13	González	85,757	—N/a	Spanish
14	Santana	81,973	—N/a	Portuguese/Spanish
15	Núñez	79,374	—N/a	Spanish
16	Castillo	78,338	—N/a	Spanish
17	de la Cruz	76,977	—N/a	Spanish
18	Cruz	64,613	—N/a	Portuguese/Spanish
19	Guzmán	63,073	—N/a	Spanish
20	Gómez	62,310	—N/a	Spanish
21	Santos	60,613	—N/a	Portuguese/Spanish
22	López	59,566	—N/a	Spanish
23	Fuentes	58,518	—N/a	Spanish
24	Vásquez	56,149	—N/a	Spanish
25	De Los Santos	54,634	—N/a	Spanish
26	Mejía	51,605	—N/a	Spanish
27	Ponce	49,952	—N/a	Spanish
28	Fernández	49,712	—N/a	Spanish
29	Vargas	49,353	—N/a	Portuguese/Spanish
30	Montes	48,574	—N/a	Spanish
Total pop.				

== El Salvador ==
Most common surnames in El Salvador as of 2005.

#	Surname	Number of people	% of population
1	Hernández	—N/a	—N/a
2	Martínez	—N/a	—N/a
3	López	—N/a	—N/a
4	García	—N/a	—N/a
5	Rodríguez	—N/a	—N/a
6	Flores	—N/a	—N/a
7	Pérez	—N/a	—N/a
8	Ramírez	—N/a	—N/a
9	González	—N/a	—N/a
10	Rivera	—N/a	—N/a
11	Vásquez	—N/a	—N/a
12	Cruz	—N/a	—N/a
13	Mejía	—N/a	—N/a
14	Rivas	—N/a	—N/a
15	Sánchez	—N/a	—N/a
16	Reyes	—N/a	—N/a
17	Díaz	—N/a	—N/a
18	Ramos	—N/a	—N/a
19	Gómez	—N/a	—N/a
20	Portillo	—N/a	—N/a
21	Escobar	—N/a	—N/a
22	Orellana	—N/a	—N/a
23	Romero	—N/a	—N/a
24	Aguilar	—N/a	—N/a
25	Alvarado	—N/a	—N/a
Total population (2007)		5,744,113	100.00

== Guatemala ==
Most common surnames in Guatemala as of 2015.

#	Surname	Persons	% of pop.
1	López	371,525	2.5%
2	García	285,670	1.9%
3	Morales	228,167	1.5%
4	Hernández	222,755	1.5%
5	Pérez	209,963	1.4%
6	González	208,795	1.4%
7	Rodríguez	135,978	0.9%
8	De León	134,010	0.9%
9	Ramírez	131,796	0.9%
10	Martínez	123,186	0.8%
11	Castillo	116,298	0.8%
12	Estrada	115,252	0.8%
13	Marroquín	113,961	0.8%
14	Gómez	110,824	0.7%
15	Vásquez	102,153	0.7%
16	Méndez	98,462	0.7%
17	Reyes	95,449	0.6%
18	Díaz	94,403	0.6%
19	Aguilar	94,096	0.6%
20	Velásquez	89,975	0.6%
First 20		3,082,718	20.7%
Total population (2015)		14,918,999	100%

== Mexico ==
Below are the most common surnames in Mexico. All the surnames listed are of Spanish origin.

Rank	Surname	Number
1	Hernández	5,526,929
2	García	4,129,360
3	Martínez	3,886,887
4	González	3,188,693
5	López	3,148,024
6	Rodríguez	2,744,179
7	Pérez	2,746,468
8	Sánchez	2,234,625
9	Ramírez	2,070,723
10	Flores	1,392,707
11	Gómez	989,295
12	Torres	841,966
13	Díaz	811,553
14	Vásquez	806,894
15	Cruz	800,874
16	Morales	771,796
17	Gutiérrez	748,789
18	Reyes	738,320
19	Ruíz	708,718
20	Jiménez	670,453
21	Mendoza	613,683
22	Aguilar	611,904
23	Ortíz	576,989
24	Álvarez	557,332
25	Castillo	553,799
26	Romero	540,922
27	Moreno	539,927
28	Chávez	517,392
29	Rivera	508,022
30	Ramos	455,728
31	Herrera	451,226
32	Medina	431,518
33	Vargas	427,854
34	Castro	419,216
35	Méndez	410,239
36	Guzmán	392,284
37	Fernández	385,741
38	Juárez	384,929
39	Muñoz	376,633
40	Ortega	372,471
41	Salazar	368,231
42	Rojas	365,457
43	Guerrero	361,557
44	Contreras	358,521
45	Luna	357,578
46	Domínguez	348,182
47	Garza	335,829
48	Velásquez	331,510
49	Estrada	324,103
50	Soto	306,227
51	Cortez	301,954
52	Lara	298,034
53	Espinoza	289,842
54	Vega	285,864
55	Ávila	284,530
56	Cervantes	276,101
57	Sandoval	273,091
58	Carrillo	267,333
59	Alvarado	266,993
60	Silva	265,553
61	León	260,246
62	Ríos	260,141
63	Navarro	258,408
64	Delgado	254,273
65	Márquez	248,933
66	Campos	246,709
67	Ibarra	241,343
68	Solís	240,008
69	Rosas	237,339
70	Miranda	233,910
71	Camacho	233,858
72	Valdez	232,680
73	Cárdenas	230,848
74	Orozco	228,963
75	Aguirre	228,754
76	Mejía	227,392
77	Acosta	224,385
78	Padilla	223,205
79	Robles	222,472
80	Núñez	222,153
81	Peña	220,868
82	Cabrera	220,647
83	Rosales	218,935
84	Molina	217,049
85	Pacheco	212,981
86	Castañeda	212,078
87	Fuentes	210,342
88	Valenzuela	210,221
89	Rangel	209,232
90	Ayala	208,964
91	Meza	207,662
92	Nava	203,308
93	Valencia	198,634
94	Maldonado	195,043
95	Ochoa	192,341
96	Serrano	185,071
97	Tapia	183,351
98	Salinas	183,098
99	Suárez	182,020
100	Zamora	181,835

== United States ==
The table below presents the most common 100 surnames as of the 2020 Census. It includes the total number of people with each surname as well as the rate per 100,000 people. Figures for the 2010 and 2000 Census are also included for comparison.

In 2020, there were 50,086,264 people with last names in the top 100, representing 15.1% of the total (331,449,281). The most common surname remains Smith; over two million Americans have that name and it is the most common name for white, native and multiracial residents. The most common name among black Americans was Williams and the most common name among Asian Americans was Nguyen.

Name	Count 2020	Rate (Note: per 100,000 people) 2020	Count 2010	Rate 2010	Count 2000	Rate 2000
Smith	2,369,644	792.8	2,442,977	828.2	2,376,206	880.9
Johnson	1,858,234	621.7	1,932,812	655.2	1,857,160	688.4
Williams	1,561,395	522.4	1,625,252	551.0	1,534,042	568.7
Brown	1,386,083	463.7	1,437,026	487.2	1,380,145	511.6
Jones	1,383,250	462.8	1,425,470	483.2	1,362,755	505.2
Garcia	1,149,510	384.6	1,166,120	395.3	858,289	318.2
Miller	1,129,186	377.8	1,161,437	393.7	1,127,803	418.1
Rodriguez	1,085,838	363.3	1,094,924	371.2	804,240	298.1
Davis	1,074,448	359.5	1,116,357	378.5	1,072,335	397.5
Martinez	1,039,848	347.9	1,060,159	359.4	775,072	287.3
Hernandez	1,013,895	339.2	1,043,281	353.7	706,372	261.9
Lopez	878,958	294.1	874,523	296.5	621,536	230.4
Gonzalez	828,405	277.2	841,025	285.1	597,718	221.6
Wilson	777,275	260.1	801,882	271.8	783,051	290.3
Anderson	756,560	253.1	784,404	265.9	762,394	282.6
Thomas	734,345	245.7	756,142	256.3	710,696	263.5
Taylor	723,758	242.1	751,209	254.7	720,370	267.0
Moore	696,384	233.0	724,374	245.6	698,671	259.0
Lee	695,657	232.7	693,023	234.9	605,860	224.6
Jackson	686,937	229.8	708,099	240.1	666,125	246.9
Perez	680,712	227.7	681,645	231.1	488,521	181.1
Martin	678,691	227.1	702,625	238.2	672,711	249.4
Thompson	640,099	214.2	664,644	225.3	644,368	238.9
White	636,798	213.1	660,491	223.9	639,515	237.1
Sanchez	607,848	203.4	612,752	207.7	441,242	163.6
Harris	603,371	201.9	624,252	211.6	593,542	220.0
Ramirez	544,204	182.1	557,423	189.0	388,987	144.2
Clark	539,661	180.6	562,679	190.8	548,369	203.3
Nguyen	531,404	177.8	437,645	148.4	310,125	115.0
Lewis	515,459	172.5	531,781	180.3	509,930	189.0
Robinson	510,138	170.7	529,821	179.6	503,028	186.5
Walker	504,833	168.9	523,129	177.3	501,307	185.8
Hall	470,080	157.3	407,076	138.0	473,568	175.6
Young	468,920	156.9	484,447	164.2	465,948	172.7
Allen	465,583	155.8	482,607	163.6	463,368	171.8
King	453,539	151.7	465,422	157.8	438,986	162.7
Wright	443,210	148.3	458,980	155.6	440,367	163.2
Torres	435,998	145.9	437,813	148.4	325,169	120.5
Flores	426,965	142.9	433,969	147.1	312,615	115.9
Scott	421,499	141.0	439,530	149.0	420,091	155.7
Hill	419,076	140.2	434,827	147.4	411,770	152.6
Green	415,664	139.1	430,182	145.8	413,477	153.3
Adams	413,470	138.4	427,865	145.1	413,086	153.1
Nelson	410,801	137.4	424,958	144.1	412,236	152.8
Baker	401,148	134.2	419,586	142.2	413,351	153.2
Rivera	398,449	133.3	391,114	132.6	299,463	111.0
Mitchell	372,104	124.5	384,486	130.3	367,433	136.2
Campbell	370,555	124.0	386,157	130.9	371,953	137.9
Gomez	368,213	123.2	365,655	124.0	263,590	97.7
Carter	364,355	122.0	376,966	127.8	362,548	134.4
Roberts	362,049	121.1	376,774	127.7	366,215	135.8
Diaz	356,910	119.4	347,636	117.9	251,772	93.3
Phillips	343,656	115.0	360,802	122.3	351,848	130.4
Evans	343,493	114.9	355,593	120.6	342,237	126.9
Cruz	342,580	114.6	334,201	113.3	231,065	85.7
Reyes	335,828	112.4	327,904	111.2	232,511	86.2
Turner	333,512	111.6	348,627	118.2	335,663	124.4
Parker	323,880	108.4	336,221	114.0	324,246	120.2
Edwards	320,927	107.4	332,423	112.7	317,070	117.5
Collins	317,373	106.2	329,770	111.8	317,848	117.8
Stewart	311,429	104.2	324,957	110.2	312,899	116.0
Morales	310,866	104.0	311,777	105.7	217,642	80.7
Patel	309,327	103.5	229,973	78.0	145,066	53.8
Morris	307,446	102.9	318,884	108.1	311,754	115.6
Murphy	298,047	99.7	308,417	104.6	300,501	111.4
Cook	290,386	97.2	302,589	102.6	294,795	109.3
Rogers	289,242	96.8	302,261	102.5	294,403	109.1
Ortiz	288,277	96.5	286,899	97.3	214,683	79.6
Morgan	276,366	92.5	286,280	97.1	276,400	102.5
Gutierrez	275,216	92.1	293,218	99.4	212,905	78.9
Kim	274,068	91.7	262,352	88.9	194,067	71.9
Cooper	271,453	90.8	280,791	95.2	270,097	100.1
Bailey	269,092	90.0	277,845	94.2	265,916	98.6
Ramos	268,640	89.9	263,464	89.3	193,096	71.6
Reed	268,584	89.9	277,030	93.9	267,443	99.1
Bell	267,025	89.3	220,599	74.8	264,752	98.1
Peterson	265,150	88.7	278,297	94.3	275,041	102.0
Doe	262,774	87.9	-	-	-	-
Ward	255,767	85.6	260,464	88.3	254,121	94.2
Kelly	255,516	85.5	267,394	90.7	260,385	96.5
Howard	253,434	84.8	264,826	89.8	254,779	94.5
Cox	249,872	83.6	261,231	88.6	253,771	94.1
Richardson	249,840	83.6	259,798	88.1	249,533	92.5
Chavez	244,201	81.7	250,898	85.1	185,865	68.9
Brooks	244,116	81.7	251,663	85.3	240,751	89.3
James	243,502	81.5	249,379	84.5	233,224	86.5
Watson	242,956	81.3	252,579	85.6	242,432	89.9
Mendoza	242,772	81.2	242,771	82.3	168,567	62.5
Gray	241,208	80.7	246,116	83.4	236,713	87.8
Bennett	239,397	80.1	247,599	83.9	239,055	88.6
Wood	238,948	80.0	250,715	85.0	247,299	91.7
Ruiz	237,286	79.4	238,234	80.8	175,429	65.0
Chen	233,798	78.2	169,580	57.5	105,544	39.1
Castillo	231,347	77.4	230,420	78.1	165,473	61.3
Alvarez	229,446	76.8	233,983	79.3	168,817	62.6
Hughes	226,912	76.0	236,271	80.1	229,390	85.0
Price	225,734	75.5	235,251	79.8	228,756	84.8
Jimenez	225,722	75.5	227,118	77.0	157,475	58.4
Ross	224,952	75.2	229,368	77.8	219,961	81.5
Long	223,485	74.8	229,374	77.8	223,494	82.9

== See also ==
- List of family name affixes
- List of most popular given names
- Lists of most common surnames, for other continents
