= Veauchette =

- Commune
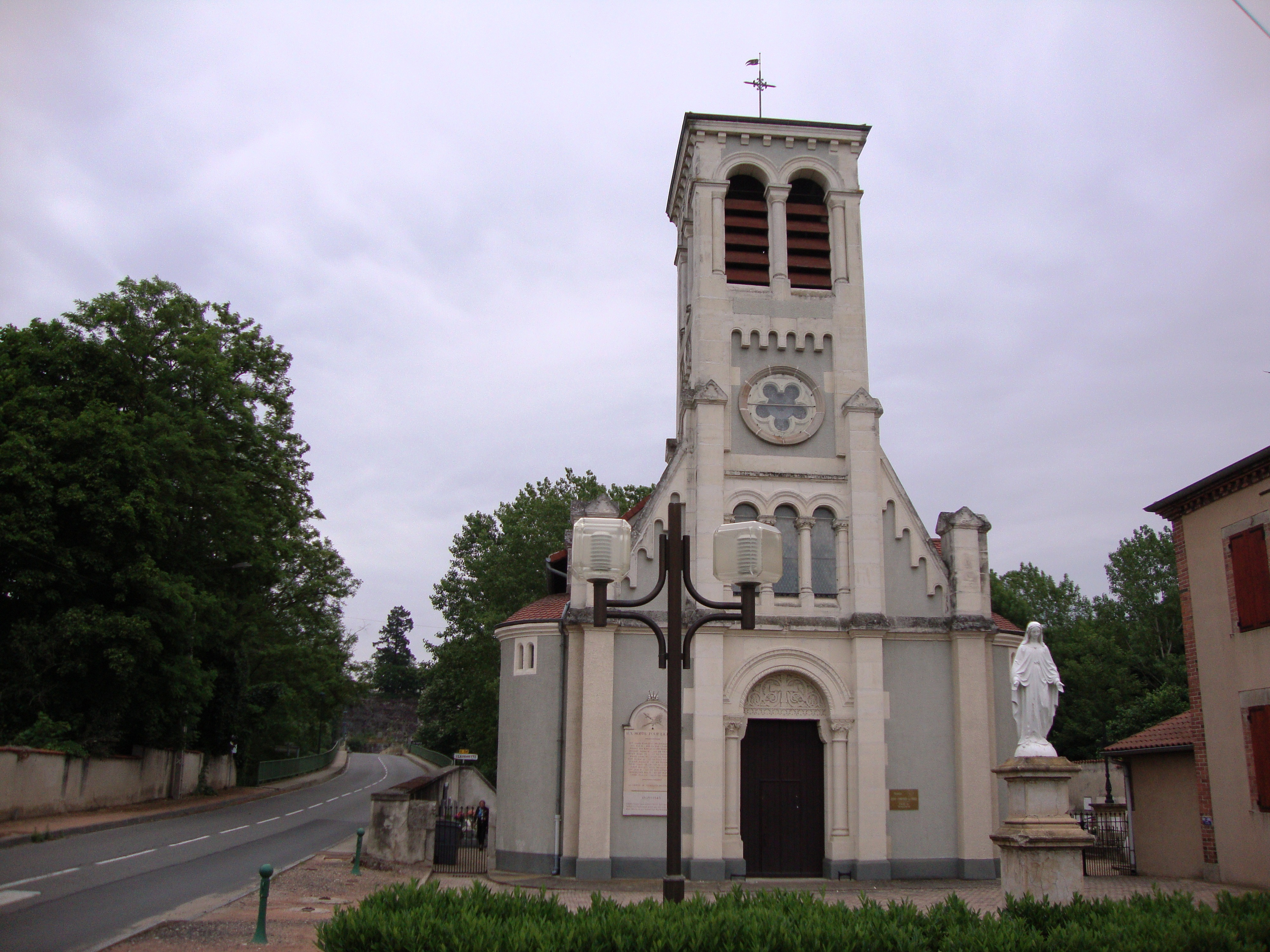

- Coat of arms
- Location of Veauchette
- Location within France Location within Auvergne-Rhône-Alpes
- Coordinates: 45°33′46″N 4°15′58″E
- Country: France
- Region: Auvergne-Rhône-Alpes
- Department: Loire
- Arrondissement: Montbrison
- Canton: Andrézieux-Bouthéon
- Intercommunality: Loire Forez Agglomération

Government
  - Mayor (2020–2026): Jean-Paul Tissot
- Area^{1}: 7.54 km^{2} (2.91 sq mi)
- Elevation: 347 m (1,138 ft)
- Highest elevation: 376 m (1,234 ft)
- Lowest elevation: 347 m (1,138 ft)
- Population (2023): 1,235
  - Density: 164/km^{2} (424/sq mi)
- Time zone: UTC+01:00 (CET)
  - Summer (DST): UTC+02:00 (CEST)
- INSEE/Postal code: 42324 /42340
- ^{1} French Land Register data, which excludes lakes, ponds, glaciers > 1 km^{2} (0.386 sq mi or 247 acres) and river estuaries.

Veauchette (French pronunciation: [voʃɛt]) is a commune in the Loire department in the Auvergne-Rhône-Alpes region in central France.

== Geography ==
Veauchette is located about 16 kilometres north-northwest of Saint-Étienne on the Loire, in the historic region of Forez. The commune is bordered by Craintilleux to the north and west, Rivas to the north, Veauche to the east, Andrézieux-Bouthéon to the south and southeast, and Saint-Cyprien to the south and southwest.

The A72 autoroute passes through the commune.

== Population ==
Historical population
Year	Pop.	±% p.a.
1968	274	—
1975	309	+1.73%
1982	435	+5.01%
1990	767	+7.35%
1999	740	−0.40%
2007	848	+1.72%
2012	1,062	+4.60%
2017	1,180	+2.13%
2023	1,235	+0.76%
Source: INSEE

== See also ==
- Communes of the Loire department
