= Saint-Galmier =

- Commune
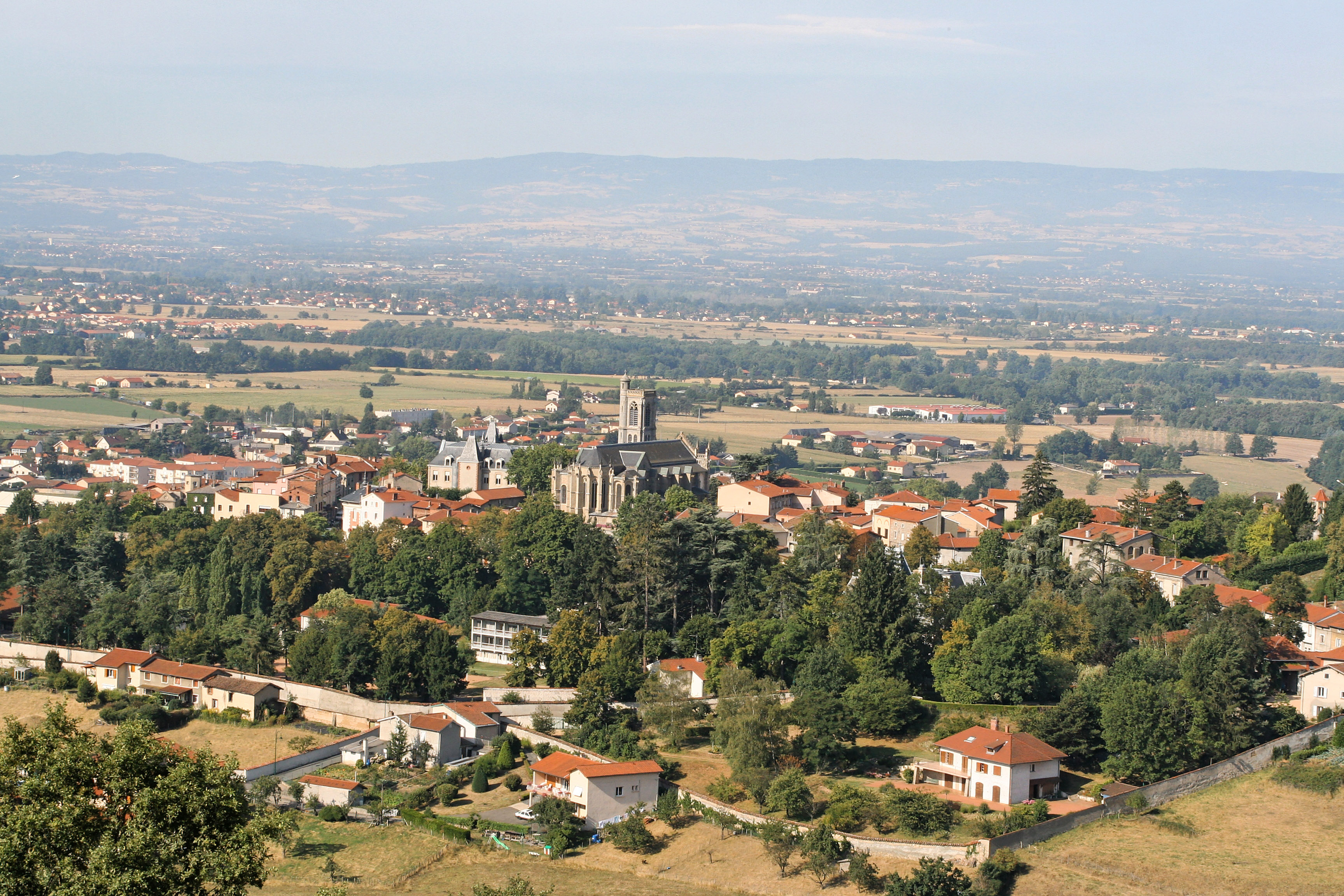

- Coat of arms
- Location of Saint-Galmier
- Location within France Location within Auvergne-Rhône-Alpes
- Coordinates: 45°35′27″N 4°19′05″E
- Country: France
- Region: Auvergne-Rhône-Alpes
- Department: Loire
- Arrondissement: Montbrison
- Canton: Andrézieux-Bouthéon
- Intercommunality: Saint-Étienne Métropole

Government
  - Mayor (2020–2026): Philippe Denis
- Area^{1}: 19.47 km^{2} (7.52 sq mi)
- Elevation: 480 m (1,570 ft)
- Highest elevation: 551 m (1,808 ft)
- Lowest elevation: 357 m (1,171 ft)
- Population (2023): 5,829
  - Density: 299.4/km^{2} (775.4/sq mi)
- Time zone: UTC+01:00 (CET)
  - Summer (DST): UTC+02:00 (CEST)
- INSEE/Postal code: 42222 /42330
- ^{1} French Land Register data, which excludes lakes, ponds, glaciers > 1 km^{2} (0.386 sq mi or 247 acres) and river estuaries.

Saint-Galmier (French pronunciation: [sɛ̃ ɡalmje]) is a city in eastern France. It is a commune in Loire department, and belongs to the arrondissement of Montbrison. Saint-Galmier covers an area of 19.5 square kilometers. As of 2023, the population of the commune was 5,829.

Saint-Galmier, located on the river Coise, south-central Loire, is a regional central city known for the mineral water Badoit produced there.

== Place name ==
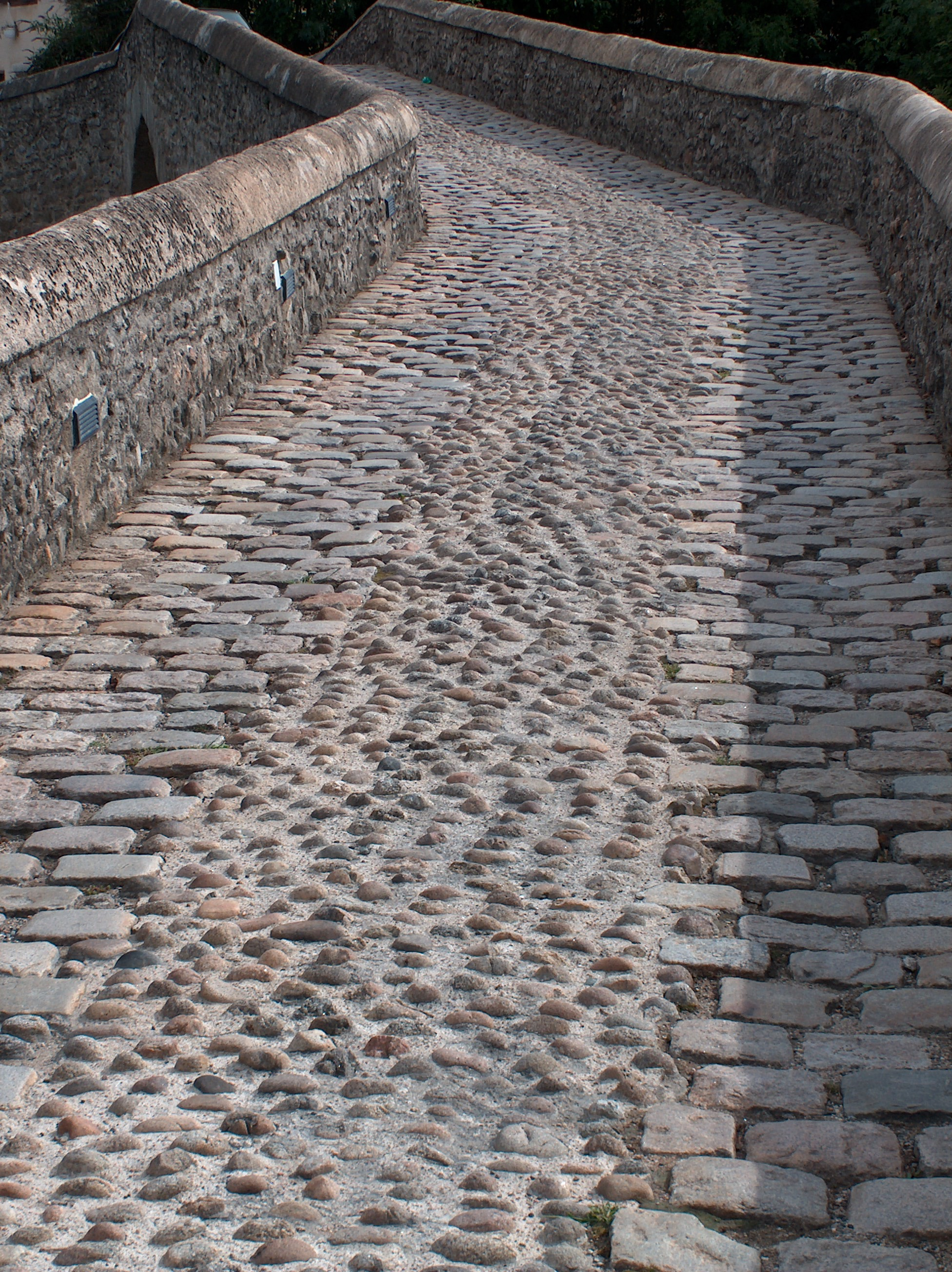
Old stone bridge across the Coise River

The name of Saint-Galmier is from the Catholic saint Galmier or Baldomerus, who was a monk at the Basilica of Saint Justus in Lyon.

During the French Revolution, Saint-Galmier was renamed Fontfortville by the revolutionaries because of his religious color, where "Fontfort" means "stable fountain".

== Geography ==
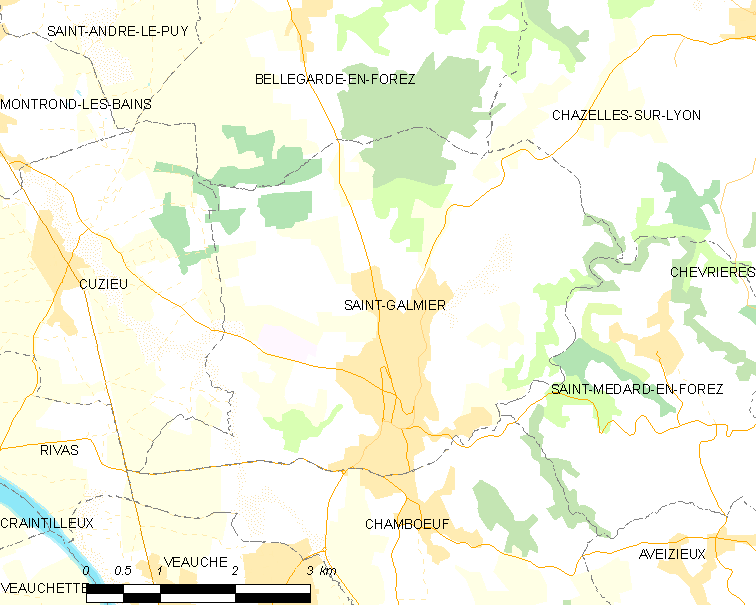
Map of the municipality of Saint-Galmier

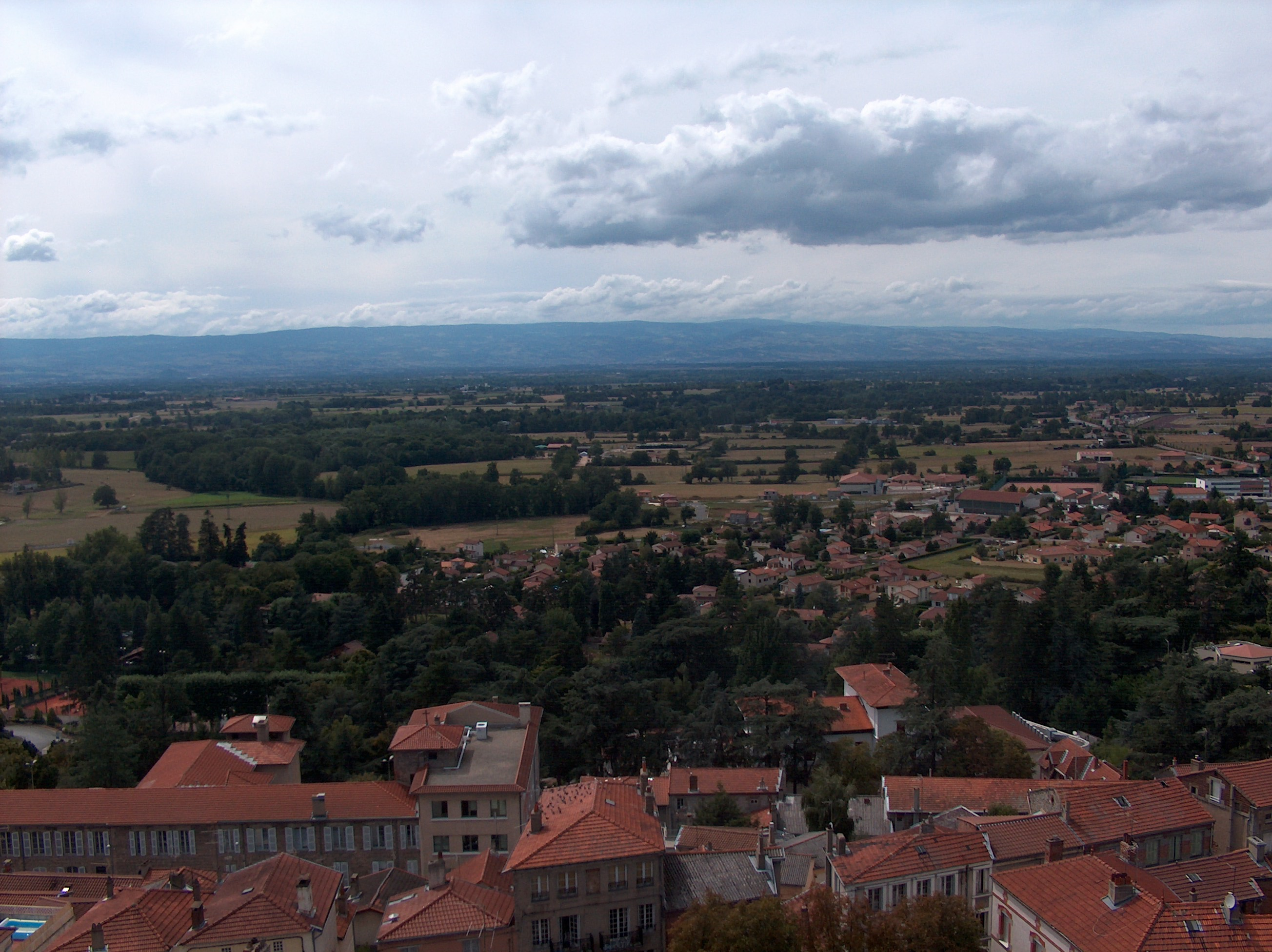
The natural scenery around Saint-Galmier

Saint-Galmier is located in southeastern France, west-central Auvergne-Rhône-Alpes and east-central Loire, about 22 kilometers from the prefecture Saint-Étienne. Towns bordering Saint-Galmier include Bellegarde-en-Forez, Chambœuf, Chazelles-sur-Lyon, Cuzieu and Saint-Médard-en-Forez.

=== Terrain ===
Saint-Galmier is located in the western foothills of Mount Lyonnais. The center of the town is located in a valley, with a relatively flat terrain, with an elevation of 357 to 551 meters.

=== River ===
The river Coise, a right tributary of the Loire, flows from east to west through the town.

=== Plant ===
Saint-Galmier belongs to the temperate deciduous forest area, which is mainly distributed on both sides of the Coise River and around the city area.

Saint-Galmier was rated as a 4-star (highest) flower city in an evaluation of flower cities.

=== Climate ===
Saint-Galmier belongs to the temperate marine climate in the Köppen climate classification.

== Administrative divisions ==
Saint-Galmier is a commune (INSEE code 42222) in the Loire department and Auvergne-Rhône-Alpes region. It is part of the arrondissement of Montbrison, the canton of Andrézieux-Bouthéon, the Saint-Étienne Métropole, and of Loire's 6th constituency.

According to the national statistics office INSEE, Saint-Galmier is part of the functional urban area (aire d'attraction des villes) of Saint-Étienne, which consists of 105 communes. INSEE also divides the town of Saint-Galmier into two "blocks" (IRIS) to facilitate the statistics of population distribution.

== Population ==
The local population is called Baldomériens (male) or Baldomérienne (female) in French.

Historical population

Year	Pop.	±% p.a.
1793	2,000	—
1800	2,394	+2.60%
1806	2,479	+0.58%
1821	2,790	+0.79%
1831	2,659	−0.48%
1836	2,805	+1.07%
1841	2,758	−0.34%
1846	3,010	+1.76%
1851	2,952	−0.39%
1856	2,932	−0.14%
1861	2,954	+0.15%
1866	3,035	+0.54%
1872	2,902	−0.74%
1876	2,936	+0.29%
1881	3,022	+0.58%
1886	3,410	+2.45%
1891	3,257	−0.91%
1896	3,296	+0.24%
1901	3,104	−1.19%

Year	Pop.	±% p.a.
1906	3,059	−0.29%
1911	3,030	−0.19%
1921	2,549	−1.71%
1926	2,529	−0.16%
1931	2,543	+0.11%
1936	2,524	−0.15%
1946	2,507	−0.07%
1954	2,573	+0.33%
1962	2,608	+0.17%
1968	2,910	+1.84%
1975	3,109	+0.95%
1982	3,680	+2.44%
1990	4,272	+1.88%
1999	5,293	+2.41%
2007	5,659	+0.84%
2012	5,646	−0.05%
2017	5,722	+0.27%
2023	5,829	+0.31%

Source: EHESS and INSEE (1968–2023)

== Politics ==
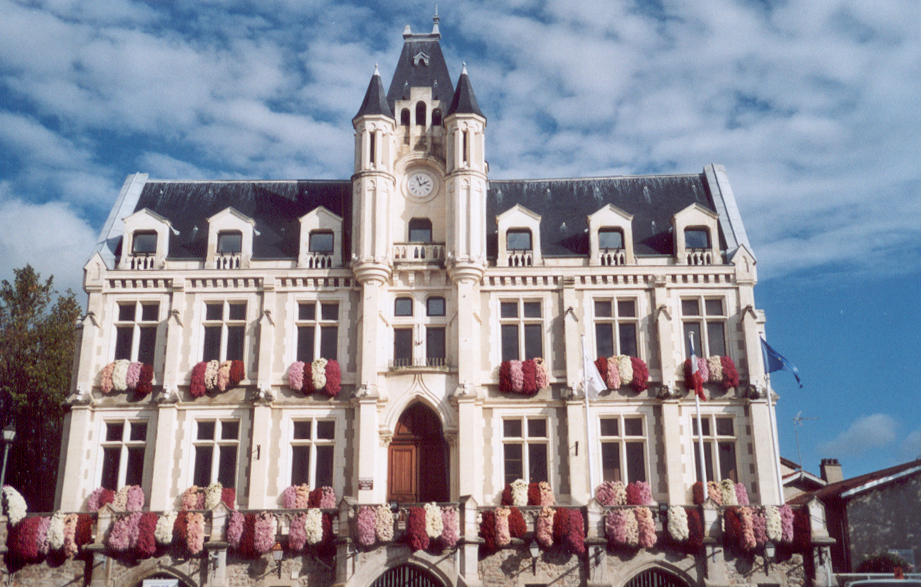
Saint-Galmier City Hall

The current mayor of Saint-Galmier is Philippe Denis, a centrist who received 60.11% of the support rate in the 2020 municipal elections.

In the 2017 French presidential election, French 25th President Emmanuel Macron received 66.29% of the support in Saint-Galmier.

Successive mayors of Saint-Galmier
Period	Mayor	Political party
1944 to 1946	Jean Rollin	Unknown
1947 to 1959	Antoine Ravel	Unknown
1959 to 1960	Camille Passot	Unknown
1960 to 1971	Camille Passot	Unknown
1971 to 1981	Maurice André	National Centre of Independents and Peasants
1981 to 1989	Joannès Moulard	Miscellaneous right
1989 to 2008	Jean Bouchardon	Miscellaneous right
2008 to 2020	Jean-Yves Charbonnier	Miscellaneous right
2020 to	Philippe Denis	Divers centre

== Water ==
Saint Galmier is a spa town and the source of Badoit mineral water. The thermal spring was known in Gallo-Roman times, but its fame increased with the general growth in interest in thermal cures in Europe during the nineteenth century.

Before Auguste Badoit commercialised the water in the 1830s, both the water and the spring from which it emerged, were known as "Fontfort". For this reason, during the French Revolutionary period, the town was briefly known as "Fontfortville".

== Personalities ==
- Gilbert Bostsarron, a member of the French Resistance was born here.
- Roger Rivière, a professional cyclist, who was born in Saint-Etienne in 1936, died here in 1976.

== See also ==
- Communes of the Loire department
