= Segura =

Segura may refer to:

== Geography ==
- Segura (river), a tributary of the Mediterranean Sea in southeastern Spain
- Sierra de Segura, a mountain range in southeastern Spain
- Segura, Gipuzkoa, a town in the Basque Country, northern Spain
- Segura de los Baños, a town in the province of Teruel, Aragón, Spain
- Ségura, a commune in southwestern France
- Segura, Portugal, a small town near Idanha-a-Nova and the border with Spain
  - Segura Bridge, a bridge located on the border
  - Fortress of Segura, a fortress located in the town

== People with the surname ==
- Alex Segura (born 1980), American author and comic book executive
- Antígona Segura (born 1971), Mexican physicist and astrobiologist
- Antonio Segura, Spanish comic book writer
- Frederick Segura, Venezuelan track and road cyclist
- Gérard Ségura, French spearfisher
- Gino Segura, Mexican politician
- Jean Segura, Dominican baseball player for the Philadelphia Phillies
- Juan José Segura-Egea, Spanish physician
- Juan José Segura-Sampedro, Spanish surgeon and researcher
- Liamani Segura (born 2008), American child singer
- Manuel F. Segura, Philippine colonel and author
- Ompong Segura, Filipino basketball player
- Pancho Segura (1921–2017), tennis player
- Patrice Ségura (born 1961), French former footballer and manager
- Santiago Segura, film actor, producer, screen writer, and director
- Tom Segura, American comedian

== See also ==
- Andrés Velencoso Segura (born 1978), Spanish model
- María Elisa Díaz de Mendibil Gómez de Segura, delegate of the Basque Country Autonomous Community to Argentina
- Juan Bautista Quirós Segura, president of Costa Rica in 1919
- Ruy López de Segura, 16th-century chess master
- Segurado (disambiguation)
