= Tremblay (surname) =

Tremblay (French pronunciation: [tʁɑ̃blɛ]) is a French toponymic surname, especially common in French-speaking Canada. As of 2006, Tremblay was the most common surname in Quebec, Canada, accounting for 1.076% of the province's population.

Notable people with the surname include:

- Alfred Tremblay (1912–1975), Canadian prospector and explorer
- Amaryllis Tremblay, Canadian actress
- Amédée Tremblay (1876–1949), Canadian organist, composer, and music educator
- Arthur Tremblay (1917–1996), Canadian politician
- Benoît Tremblay (born 1948), Canadian politician
- Charles Tremblay (1930–2002), American Nordic combined skier
- Charles-Henri Tremblay, Canadian politician
- Clarisse Tremblay (1951–1999), Canadian poet and writer
- David Tremblay (born 1987), Canadian freestyle wrestler
- Émilie Fortin Tremblay (1872–1949), Canadian explorer
- Emma Tremblay (born 2004), Canadian actress
- Erica Tremblay (born 1980), Seneca–Cayuga American documentary film director
- Eugène Tremblay (1936–2026), Canadian Roman Catholic bishop
- Fannie Tremblay (1885–1970), stage name of Stéphanie Massey, Canadian performer
- François Leclerc du Tremblay (1577–1638), French friar and agent
- François-Louis Tremblay (born 1980), Canadian short track speed skater
- Gaston Tremblay (1924–1998), Canadian politician
- George Tremblay (1911–1982), Canadian-American pianist, composer, and author
- Gérald Tremblay (born 1942), Canadian politician and businessman
- Gérald R. Tremblay (born 1944), Canadian lawyer
- Ghyslain Tremblay (1951-2020), Canadian actor and comedian
- Gilles Tremblay (disambiguation), multiple people
- J. C. Tremblay (1939–1994), Canadian hockey player
- Jacob Tremblay (born 2006), Canadian actor
- Jacques Tremblay (1942–2026), Canadian politician
- Jacques-Raymond Tremblay, Canadian politician
- Jean Tremblay (born 1948), Canadian businessman and politician
- Jean-Gaston Tremblay (1928-2011), Canadian religious leader
- Jean-Noël Tremblay (1926–2020), Canadian politician
- Johanne-Marie Tremblay (born 1950), Canadian actress
- John Paul Tremblay (born 1968), Canadian actor
- Kay Tremblay (1914–2005), Canadian dancer
- Karelle Tremblay (born 1996), Canadian film and television actress
- Kathy Tremblay (born 1982), Canadian triathlete
- Léonard Tremblay (1896–1968), Canadian politician
- Lise Tremblay, (born 1957), Canadian writer
- Lucie Blue Tremblay (born 1958), Canadian folk singer-songwriter
- Marc Tremblay, engineer at Microsoft
- Marcel Tremblay (disambiguation), multiple people
- Mario Tremblay (born 1956), Canadian hockey player and coach
- Mario Tremblay (aka MC Mario), Canadian disk jockey
- Michel Tremblay (politician) (born 1933), Canadian politician
- Michel Tremblay (born 1942), French Canadian novelist and playwright
- Monique Gagnon-Tremblay (born 1940), Canadian politician
- Paul G. Tremblay (born 1971), American author
- Pamphile Réal Du Tremblay (1879–1955), Quebec lawyer, businessman and politician
- Raymond D. Tremblay, Canadian writer
- Ray Condo (born Ray Tremblay) (1950–2004), Canadian musician and painter
- René Tremblay (1922–1968), Canadian politician
- Richard E. Tremblay (born 1944), Canadian psychologist
- Richard "Blaimert" Tremblay, Canadian television writer and producer
- Richard-Max Tremblay(born 1952), Canadian artist and photographer
- Rodrigue Tremblay (born 1939), Canadian economist, humanist and political figure
- Roland Michel Tremblay (born 1972), Canadian author
- Rosalie Tremblay (born 2008), Canadian ice hockey player
- Stéphan Tremblay (born 1973), Canadian politician from Quebec
- Stéphane Tremblay, Canadian politician from Quebec
- Stéfanie Tremblay (born 1990), Canadian judoka
- Suzanne Tremblay (1937–2020), Canadian politician
- Sylvain Tremblay (born 1965), Canadian racing driver
- Thomas-Louis Tremblay (1886–1951), Canadian general
- Véronyque Tremblay (born 1974), Canadian journalist and politician
- Yannick Tremblay (born 1975), Canadian ice hockey player
