= Mejía (surname) =

Origin
- Origin: Spain (Galicia)
- Meaning: Various theories

Other names
- Variant forms: Mejías, Megía/Megías, Mexía/Mexia/Mexías

Mejía is a Spanish surname of Galician origin, dating back to the early 1500s in Spain. The surname is predominantly found in Galicia, Andalusia, and Toledo. It is also common in Portugal and in several Latin American countries, particularly Mexico, Honduras, and Colombia.

== Etymology ==
The first written record of the surname being used is in the marriage of a Galician man named García Sánchez de Mejías to the daughter of Juan Sánchez de Mendoza, brother of Don Lope de Mendoza, Archbishop of Compostela.

The surname may have originated as a toponym for the towns of either Mesía or Muxía in Galicia.

According to "El Blasonario de la Consanguinidad Ibérica" (The Armorial of the Iberian Consanguinity) by genealogists Ampelio Alonso de Cadenas and Don Vicente de Cadenas y Vicent, Mejia is described as having been brought to Galicia and León by Sevillians who escaped to the mountainous northern provinces amidst the Moorish invasions of southern Spain. Prior to this, the bearers of the name had lived in Seville since Visigoth and Roman times. After the Reconquista, some returned to Seville.

Note that Mexía is the older Spanish spelling of the name. In the modern orthography of Spain, the spelling is Mejía, though in Mexico the older orthography is still considered correct. Similarly, until recently Spaniards rendered the country name Méjico rather than México, though this has reversed in recent decades out of deference to Mexico.

== Geographical distribution ==
As of 2014, 23.7% of all known bearers of the surname Mejía were residents of Mexico (frequency 1:450), 16.2% of Colombia (1:253), 14.4% of Honduras (1:53), 8.0% of Guatemala (1:172), 6.5% of the Dominican Republic (1:138), 6.3% of the United States (1:4,915), 6.3% of El Salvador (1:86), 4.7% of Peru (1:583), 2.9% of Ecuador (1:475), 2.8% of Nicaragua (1:185), 2.5% of the Philippines (1:3,461), 2.0% of Venezuela (1:1,266) and 1.8% of Bolivia (1:510).

In Spain, the frequency of the surname was higher than national average (1:5,678) in the following autonomous communities:

1. Community of Madrid (1:2,644)
2. Castilla–La Mancha (1:3,787)
3. Catalonia (1:4,083)
4. Navarre (1:5,176)
5. Balearic Islands (1:5,189)
6. La Rioja (1:5,296)

In Honduras, the frequency of the surname was higher than national average (1:53) in the following departments:

1. Ocotepeque Department (1:19)
2. Copán Department (1:31)
3. La Paz Department (1:32)
4. Santa Bárbara Department (1:40)
5. Comayagua Department (1:40)
6. Cortés Department (1:43)
7. Lempira Department (1:44)
8. Colón Department (1:49)
9. Atlántida Department (1:50)
10. Yoro Department (1:52)

=== Popularity in Colombia ===
The surname is a popular last name in Colombia, especially its Paisa region. According to the book "Genealogies of Antioquia and Caldas" by Gabriel Arango Mejía, the first Spaniard to bring the name to Colombia was a man named Don Juan Mejía de Tobar Montoya.

== Notable people ==
=== Mejía, Mejia ===
- Alejandro Mejía (born 1993), Dominican baseball player
- Alexander Mejía (born 1988), Colombian midfielder footballer
- Alfonso Mejia-Arias (born 1961), Mexican musician, writer, social activist and politician of Roma origin (Gitano)
- Alfredo Mejía (born 1990), Honduran footballer
- Álvaro Mejía (athlete) (1940–2021), Colombian long distance runner
- Álvaro Mejía (cyclist) (born 1967), Colombian bicycle racer
- Álvaro Mejía Pérez (born 1982), Spanish football defender
- Analilia Mejia (born 1977), American activist and politician
- Arístides Mejía (born 1960), Honduran politician, Vice President Commissioner of Honduras
- Arturo Salazar Mejía (1921–2009), Roman Catholic bishop of Pasto, Colombia
- Camilo Mejía (born 1975), U.S.-Nicaraguan war activist
- Carlos Will Mejía (born 1983), Honduran football midfielder
- Christian Mejía (born 1989), Puerto Rican football goalie
- Cindy Mejía (born 1988), Peruvian model and beauty pageant titleholder
- Clemente Mejía (1928–1978), Mexican Olympic swimmer
- Cristian Mejía (born 1990), Colombian football striker
- Diego Mejía (Salvadoran footballer) (born 1982), Salvadoran football forward
- Dionisio Mejía (1907–1963), Mexican football forward
- Edgar Mejía (born 1988), Mexican footballer
- Erick Mejia (born 1994), Dominican baseball player
- Ernesto Mejía (born 1985), Venezuelan professional baseball player
- Félix Mejía (1776–1853), Spanish journalist, novelist, playwright and historian
- Felix Restrepo Mejía (1887–1965), Jesuit priest, writer, pedagogue, classical scholar and humanist from Colombia
- Fabrizio Mejía (born 1968), Mexican writer and journalist
- Fausto Ramón Mejía Vallejo (born 1941), Dominican Republic Roman Catholic bishop
- Francisco Mejía (born 1995), Dominican baseball player
- Gerardo Mejía (born 1965), Ecuadorian-American Latin-style rapper (singer) and record company executive
- Gilberto Echeverri Mejía (1936–2003), Colombian electrical engineer, politician and kidnap victim
- Hermann Mejía (born 1973), Venezuelan-born illustrator and painter
- Hipólito Mejía (born 1941), President of the Dominican Republic
- J. C. Mejía (born 1996), Dominican baseball player
- Jenrry Mejía (born 1989), Dominican baseball player
- Joel Mejia (born 1990), Dominican Olympic sprinter
- Jorge María Mejía (1923–2014), Argentine Roman Catholic cardinal
- Juan Camilo Mejía (born 1981), Colombian soccer player
- Kenneth Mejia (born 1990), American politician
- León Mejía (born 1934), Colombian cyclist
- Luis Mejía (born 1991), Panamanian footballer, plays goalie
- Liborio Mejía (1792–1816), Colombian independence war leader, politician
- Marco Mejía (born 1975), Honduran football midfielder
- María Emma Mejía (born 1953), Colombian journalist and politician
- María Isabel Mejía (born 1945), Colombian politician and economist
- Mariano Díaz Mejía (born 1993), Dominican footballer
- Matías Ramos Mejía (1810–1885), Argentine colonel
- Miguel Aceves Mejía (1915–2006), Mexican composer, actor, and singer
- Natalie Mejia (born 1988), Mexican American musician
- Omar Mejía Giraldo (born 1966), Colombian Roman Catholic archbishop
- Óscar Mejía (born 1978), Dominican footballer
- Óscar Humberto Mejía Victores (1930–2016), Guatemalan president
- Pedro Mejía (athlete) (born 1978), Dominican Olympic sprinter
- Pedro Mexía (1497–1551), Spanish writer, humanist and historian
- Ricardo Mejía (born 1963), Mexican long-distance runner
- Roberto Mejía (born 1972), Dominican Republic baseball player
- Roger Mejía (born 1984), Nicaraguan footballer
- Sammy Mejia (born 1983), Dominican American basketball player
- Sandra Llano-Mejía (born 1951), Colombian multimedia artist, video artist
- Tatán Mejía (born 1985), Colombian freestyle motocross rider
- Tenoch Huerta Mejía, Mexican film actor
- Tomás Mejía (1820–1867), Mexican general, executed for treason
- Vicente Mejía Colindres (1878–1966), President of the Republic of Honduras

=== Mejías, Mejias ===
- Antonio Mejías Jiménez (1922–1975), Venezuelan-born Spanish bullfighter
- Javier Mejías (born 1983), Spanish bicycle racer
- Octavio Mejías (born 1982), Venezuelan weightlifter
- Román Mejías (1925–2023), Dominican American baseball player, outfielder
- Sam Mejías (born 1952), Dominican American baseball player, outfielder
- Tomás Mejías (born 1989), Spanish football player
- Wolfgang Mejías (born 1983), Venezuelan Olympic épée fencer
- Yasmín Mejías, Puerto Rican actress, comedian, singer, and politician

=== Mexía, Mexia ===
- Alvaro Mexia, 17th-century Spanish explorer and cartographer of the east coast of Florida
- José Antonio Mexía (1800–1839), Mexican politician
- Pedro Mexía, 16th-century Spanish Renaissance writer, humanist and historian
- Ynés Mexía (1870–1938), Mexican American botanist and explorer
