= Albarado =

Albarado is a surname. Notable people with the surname include:

- Oscar Albarado (1948–2021), American boxer
- Robby Albarado (1973–2026), American jockey

== See also ==
- Alvarado (surname)
