= Badoit =

French carbonated mineral water brand

- Badoit logo (since 2012)

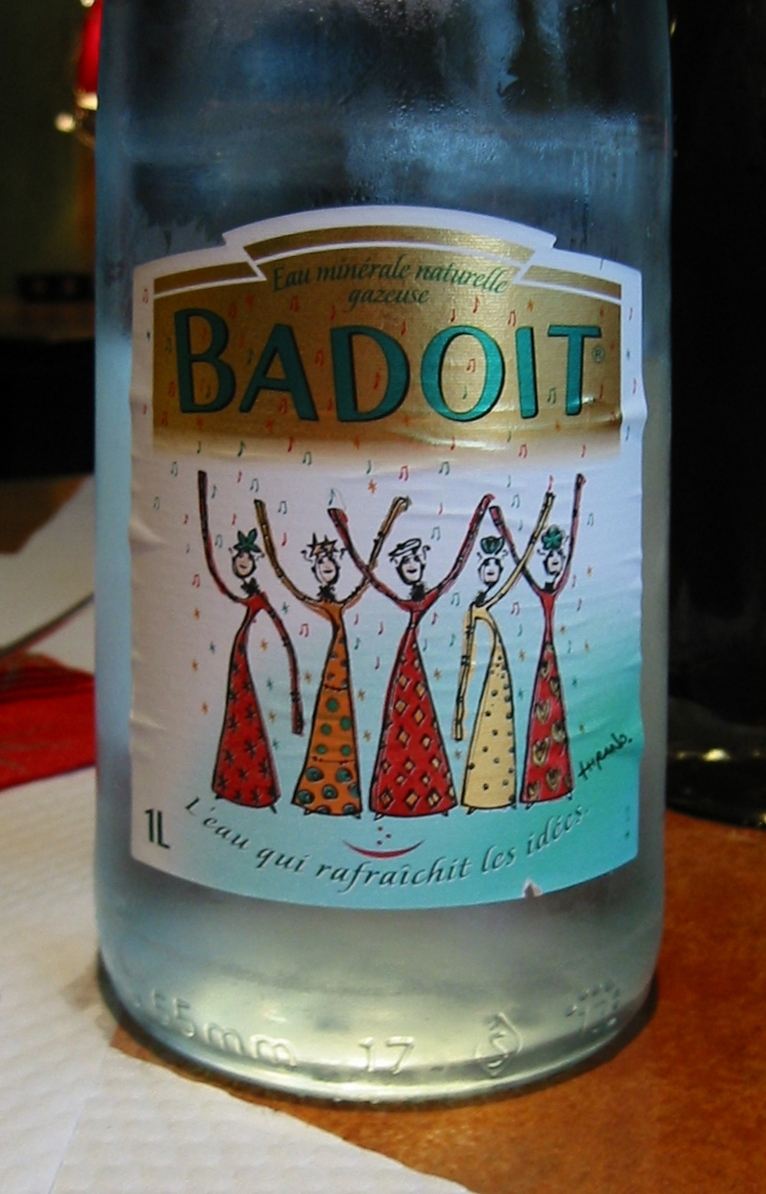
- Bottle of Badoit mineral water
- Country: France
- Produced by: Danone
- Introduced: 1778
- Source: Saint-Galmier
- Type: Mineral water, carbonated water
- pH: 6
- Calcium (Ca): 153
- Chloride (Cl): 54
- Fluoride (F): 1,2
- Magnesium (Mg): 80
- Silica (SiO_{2}): 27
- Sodium (Na): 180
- Sulfate (SO_{4}): 35
- Website: www.badoit.fr
- All concentrations in milligrams per liter (mg/L); pH without units

Badoit (French pronunciation: [badwa]) is a French brand of carbonated mineral water from Saint-Galmier, Loire. 300 million Badoit bottles are sold annually worldwide. Badoit is owned by the Société des eaux minérales d'Évian, a subsidiary of the Danone group, relating to the business of bottled water.

== Description ==
The carbonic acid gas therein is formed by combination and not by compression. This is a very clear water, a tangy flavor, fresh, very nice. In its most recent analysis made by Mr. O. Henry, giving it nearly 3 grams of carbon dioxide per liter, many earthen and alkaline bi-carbonates and proportion of nitrate of magnesia whose presence seems to explain this amazing fact that the residents of Saint-Galmier have never counted a calculous person among them.

One source in 1856 says that the spring was capable of producing 7000 bottles a day.

=== Analytical composition ===
Physico-chemical properties:

- Dry extract at 180 °C: 1,100 mg/L
- pH: 6

Extended analytical composition
Chemical specie	Concentration (mg/L)
Calcium (Ca^{2+})	153
Magnesium (Mg^{2+})	80
Chloride (K^{−})	54
Sodium (Na^{+})	180
Potassium (K^{+})	11
Sulfate (SO^{2−}_{4})	35
Bicarbonate (HCO^{−}_{3})	1 250
Fluoride (F^{−})	1,2
Silicon dioxide (SiO_{2})	27
Nitrate (NO^{−}_{3})	7

=== Radio-elements ===
A 2004 analysis by the French Society for Radiation Protection confirms the spring water emits 70 becquerels per liter of radiation before treatment, containing 58 mg/m3 of uranium, 350 Bq/m3 of radium-226 and 713 Bq/m3 of radium-228. After treatment, it contains 5.45 mg/m3 of uranium, 28 Bq/m3 of radium 226 and 44 Bq/m3 of radium 228.

== History ==
=== From the Roman Empire to the Second World War (1945) ===
The spring has been known since ancient times. Roman thermal baths have been found here, and Roman writings mention the existence of naturally sparkling water in the region. In the 18th century, the water was prescribed by local doctors.

In 1778, Marin Richard de Laprade (1744–1797), advisor and physician to King of France Louis XVI, studied the virtues of this water, which he described as aperitive and exhilarating, stimulating the mood and the spirit.

It was in 1837 that Auguste Saturnin Badoit, then aged 36, obtained a lease on the Fontfort spring, located in Saint-Galmier, above the Forez plain. He began bottling the water of Saint Galmier in 1838.

In 1845, to avoid competition, Auguste Badoit bought other springs which also bore his name.

In 1848, the lease on the Fontfort spring was not renewed. The decision was made to abandon the spa business and to market Badoit in bottles. Auguste Badoit died in 1858, and was succeeded by his wife and daughter. Badoit sold 1.5 million bottles a year.

In 1859, the company was sold to a local competitor, the André company, with Auguste Badoit's son-in-law, Benoit Cherbouquet, retaining management of the spring.

In 1870, the stoneware bottles were sealed with wax, and in 1874, a label on the bottles was introduced, setting the brand apart from the rest, while at the same time combating counterfeiting. In 1876, Badoit bought the central springs of Saint-Galmier, which were to become its main source of sparkling mineral water. In 1883, Badoit set up a glassworks in Veauche to manufacture its bottles, enabling the brand to limit the cost of purchasing and transporting its empty bottles.

Over the years, Badoit bought a number of springs, including Courbière and Nouvelle in 1886, Rémy and Noël in 1894, and Romaines in 1910. In 1893, Badoit became a société anonyme (S.A.), and in 1897, it was recognised as being in the public interest by the Académie Nationale de Médecine (French Academy of Medicine). Badoit has won numerous medals, including a gold medal at the Universal Exhibition in Rome, Italy in 1888 and a silver medal at the one in Barcelona, Spain the same year.

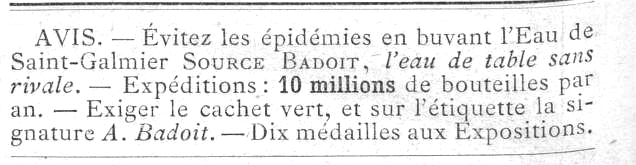
Early ad for Badoit from 1857: "Avoid epidemics by drinking water from St. Galmier, Source Badoit, The table water without equal. Shipping: 10 million bottles per year. Demand the green seal, with the signature of "A. Badoit". 10 Medals awarded at Expositions."

=== After World War Two ===
In the aftermath of World War II, Badoit left the pharmacy and entered supermarkets in 1954, which boosted sales. In 1960, Badoit joined forces with the Société des eaux minérales d'Évian, known as Évian, and in 1965 the two companies merged.

In 1970 it became a fully owned subsidiary of Boussois Souchon Neuvesel, later to become Danone, and in 1973, the bottle was made of PVC for mass distribution. In 1982, the Bourse de la création Badoit (Badoit Creation Grant) was created to reward young talents in the catering industry.

In 1999, the bottles were made of PET, and Danone withdrew from its glass business.

In 2004, the more sparkling red Badoit was launched. In 2007, glass Badoit made a comeback with restaurants, and in 2015, Badoit launched its sparkling mineral water in cans.

Today, Badoit is an established brand, with a total production of 300 million bottles sold worldwide.

In June 2019, Danone announced that from that month onward, Badoit would no longer be available in the United Kingdom. Danone explained that, as Badoit is a natural mineral water, the company was conscious of the need to preserve the source and never collect more than nature can offer. The Saint Galmier region of France had been experiencing droughts over the past few years and this had affected the rate of groundwater replenishment. Danone believed that the responsible approach was to reduce the amount of Badoit it bottled and sold, to protect the source for future generations.

== Products ==
Badoit sells three types of sparkling water: Green Badoit, Red Badoit (more sparkling) and Flavored Badoit (with fruits and aromatic plants).

== Numbers ==
Badoit produces 1 million bottles a day. The brand has sold 210 million litres. 22% of this volume is consumed outside the home. In 2012, Badoit represented 12.6% by volume and 16.1% by value of the sparkling natural water market in France.

== See also ==
- Evian and Perrier, other world-renowned brands of French mineral water
