= Unias =

- Commune
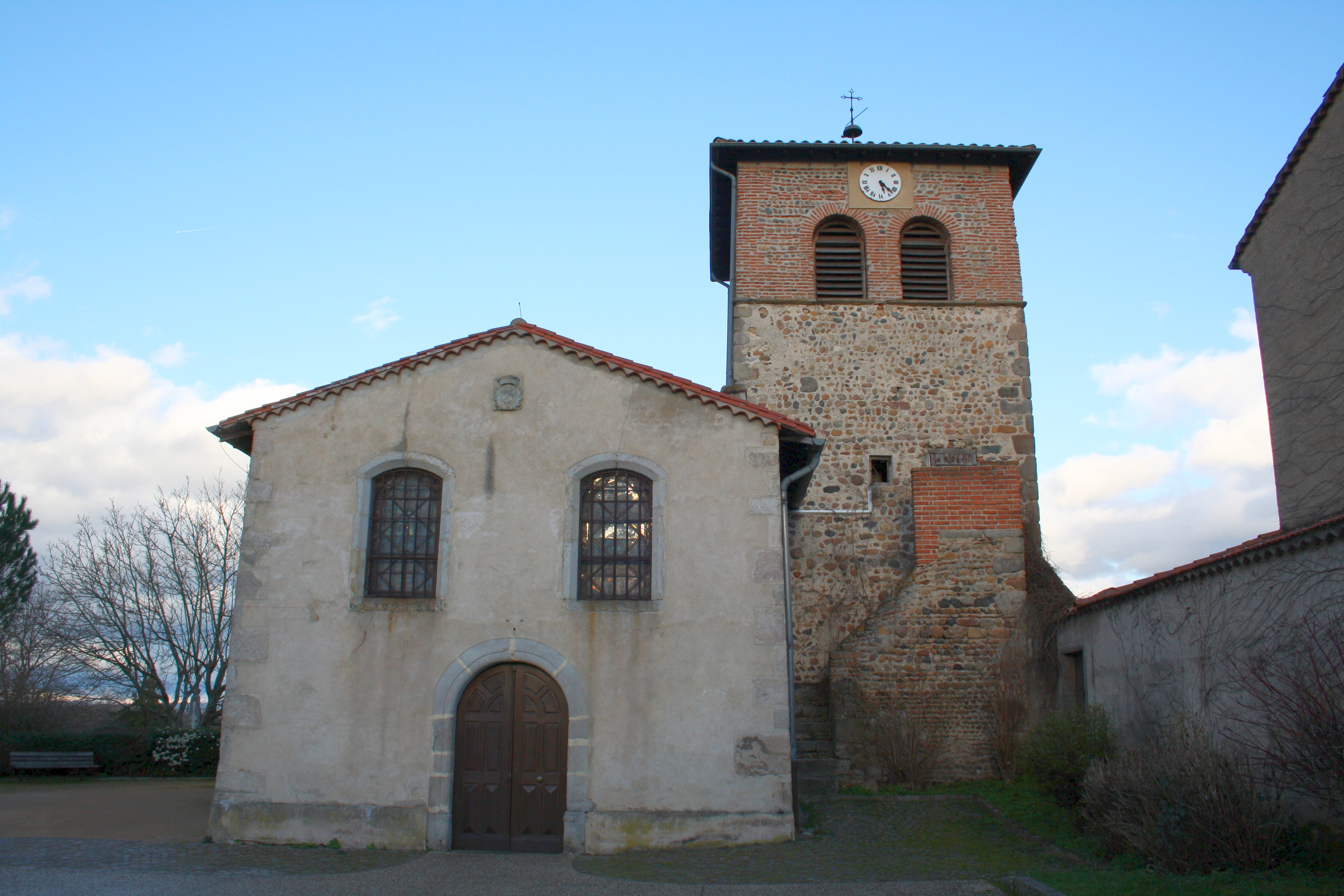

- Coat of arms
- Location of Unias
- Location within France Location within Auvergne-Rhône-Alpes
- Coordinates: 45°36′21″N 4°13′42″E
- Country: France
- Region: Auvergne-Rhône-Alpes
- Department: Loire
- Arrondissement: Montbrison
- Canton: Andrézieux-Bouthéon
- Intercommunality: Loire Forez Agglomération

Government
  - Mayor (2020–2026): Yves Duport
- Area^{1}: 5.37 km^{2} (2.07 sq mi)
- Elevation: 418 m (1,371 ft)
- Highest elevation: 371 m (1,217 ft)
- Lowest elevation: 345 m (1,132 ft)
- Population (2023): 469
  - Density: 87.3/km^{2} (226/sq mi)
- Time zone: UTC+01:00 (CET)
  - Summer (DST): UTC+02:00 (CEST)
- INSEE/Postal code: 42315 /42210
- ^{1} French Land Register data, which excludes lakes, ponds, glaciers > 1 km^{2} (0.386 sq mi or 247 acres) and river estuaries.

Unias (French pronunciation: [ynja]) is a commune in the Loire department in central France.

== Population ==
Historical population
Year	Pop.	±% p.a.
1968	114	—
1975	153	+4.29%
1982	202	+4.05%
1990	204	+0.12%
1999	237	+1.68%
2007	321	+3.87%
2012	395	+4.24%
2017	433	+1.85%
2023	469	+1.34%
Source: INSEE

== See also ==
- Communes of the Loire department
