= Rivas =

Rivas may refer to:

== Places ==
- Rivas, Pérez Zeledón, a district in Costa Rica, and an archaeological site.
- Rivas-Vaciamadrid, a municipality in Madrid, Spain.
- Rivas, Loire, a commune in France.
- Rivas Department, Nicaragua
  - Rivas, Nicaragua, a city and municipality, capital of the department
- Rivas Peaks, Antarctica.

== People ==
- Rivas (surname)

== Battles ==
- First Battle of Rivas (June 29, 1855), between the Nicaraguan army and rebel forces under William Walker
- Second Battle of Rivas (April 11, 1856), between the Costa Rican militia under General Mora and the Nicaraguan forces of William Walker

== See also ==
- Riva (disambiguation)
