= Meza =

Meza may refer to:

== People ==
- Abinadi Meza (born 1977), American artist
- Andrea Meza (born 1994), Mexican beauty queen and Miss Universe 2020
- Arturo Meza (born 1956), Mexican musical artist and author
- Christian de Meza, commander of the Danish army during the 1864 Second Schleswig War
- Enrique Meza (born 1948), Mexican football coach
- Enrique Meza Jr (born 1979), Mexican football coach
- Florinda Meza (born 1949), Mexican television and film actress
- Guillermo Meza (artist) (1917–1997), a Mexican artist
- Guillermo Meza (footballer) (1988–2010), a Mexican football player
- José Luis Oliva Meza, former mayor of Veracruz, Mexico
- Juan Meza (1956–2023), boxer
- Juan N. Silva Meza (born 1944), Mexican jurist
- Luis Antonio Meza, Peruvian composer
- Maximiliano Meza (footballer, born 1992), Argentine international midfielder
- Maximiliano Meza (footballer, born 1997), Argentine midfielder
- Miguel de San Román Meza (1802–1863), President of Peru between 1862 and 1863
- Pablo José Meza, Argentinian producer, film director, and screenplay writer
- Raul Meza Jr (born 1960), American serial killer
- Severo Meza (born 1986), football player

== Other uses ==
- Meza (butterfly), a genus of grass skipper butterflies
- Meza (rural locality), several rural localities in Kostroma Oblast, Russia
- Meža, a river in Carinthia, Slovenia

== See also ==
- Mesa (disambiguation)
- Capitán Meza, a town and a district in the Itapúa department of Paraguay
- Meze, a selection of small dishes served as appetizers in much of West Asia, Middle East and the Balkans
