= Valverde (surname) =

Valverde is a Spanish and Portuguese surname, and may refer to:

- Alejandro Valverde (born 1980), Spanish cyclist
- Amelia Valverde, (born 1987), Costa Rican football manager
- Ana Valverde (1798–1864), Dominican activist
- Cristina López Valverde (born 1959), Argentine politician
- Ernesto Valverde (born 1964), Spanish football player and manager
- Federico Valverde (born 1998), Uruguayan football player
- Ísis Valverde (born 1987), Brazilian actress
- Joaquín Valverde Durán (1846–1910), Spanish composer of zarzuelas, flautist and conductor
- Joaquín Valverde Sanjuán (1875–1918), Spanish composer of zarzuelas, son of the preceding
- José María Valverde, Spanish poet and philosopher, Rector of the University of Barcelona
- José Valverde (born 1978), baseball player
- Juan de Valverde (c. 1525-?), published a book about anatomy
- Julián García Valverde (born 1946), Spanish politician
- María Valverde (born 1987), Spanish actress
- Mariana Valverde, Canadian academic
- Mary Valverde (born 1975), artist
- Vincente de Valverde (c. 1499–1541), Spanish bishop active in Peru
- Yeraldine Bonilla Valverde (born 1992), interim governor of Sinaloa and Mexican politician.

== See also ==
- Jesús Malverde, Mexican folk saint and bandit
