= Saint-André-le-Puy =

- Commune
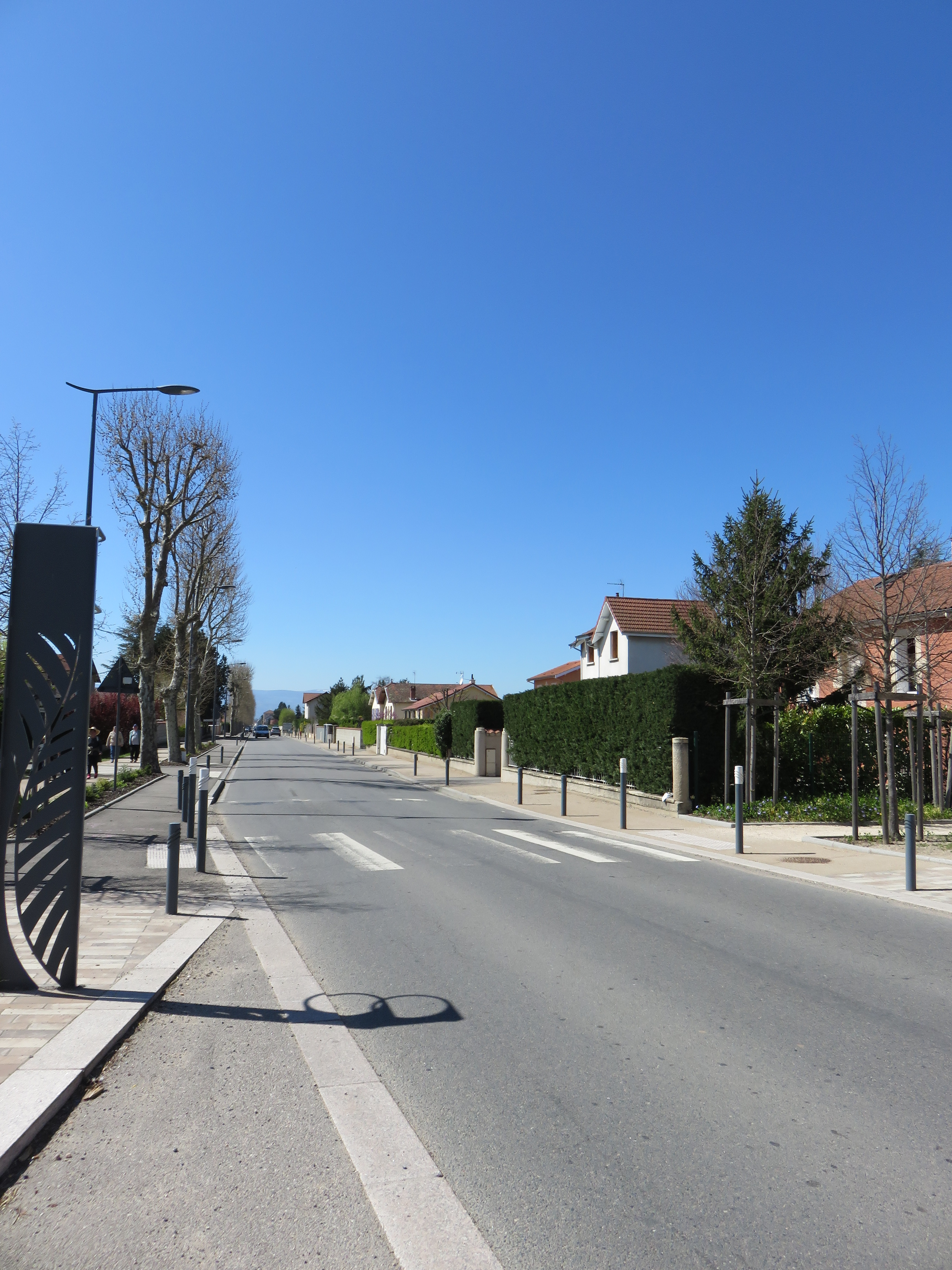

- Coat of arms
- Location of Saint-André-le-Puy
- Location within France Location within Auvergne-Rhône-Alpes
- Coordinates: 45°38′47″N 4°15′39″E
- Country: France
- Region: Auvergne-Rhône-Alpes
- Department: Loire
- Arrondissement: Montbrison
- Canton: Andrézieux-Bouthéon

Government
  - Mayor (2020–2026): Jean Achard
- Area^{1}: 8.66 km^{2} (3.34 sq mi)
- Elevation: 383 m (1,257 ft)
- Highest elevation: 374 m (1,227 ft)
- Lowest elevation: 357 m (1,171 ft)
- Population (2023): 1,530
  - Density: 177/km^{2} (458/sq mi)
- Time zone: UTC+01:00 (CET)
  - Summer (DST): UTC+02:00 (CEST)
- INSEE/Postal code: 42200 /42210
- ^{1} French Land Register data, which excludes lakes, ponds, glaciers > 1 km^{2} (0.386 sq mi or 247 acres) and river estuaries.

Saint-André-le-Puy (French pronunciation: [sɛ̃.t‿ɑ̃dʁe lə pɥi]) is a commune in the Loire department in central France.

== Location ==
It is located 26 km (16 mi) from Saint-Étienne (turn off the N89 westbound at Montrond-les-Bains onto the N82 southwards).

== Population ==
Historical population
Year	Pop.	±% p.a.
1968	653	—
1975	662	+0.20%
1982	1,002	+6.10%
1990	1,151	+1.75%
1999	1,182	+0.30%
2007	1,215	+0.34%
2012	1,326	+1.76%
2017	1,539	+3.02%
2023	1,530	−0.10%
Source: INSEE

== Miscellaneous ==
Puy derives from the Provençal word "Puech", meaning an isolated hill. It rejected the proposed European Constitution by 60%.

== See also ==
- Communes of the Loire department
