= Gilbert Bostsarron =

- Born: 31 August 1903; Saint-Galmier, Loire
- Died: 20 January 1944 (aged 40); Bondues

Gilbert Auguste Bostsarron was born in 1903 in Saint-Galmier, Loire. He was educated as an engineer at the École de la Métallurgie et des Mines in Nancy. In 1927 he joined the engineering company Société Franco-Belge (Raismes), in 1934 he became a chief officer of the company, and in 1938 its deputy Director. In 1940 he became responsible for the management of the company after its director had fled to Canada.

In 1941 he became a member of the French Resistance, with nom-de-guerre Claude. He contributed to the underground publication La Voix du Nord, and joined the Libération-Nord resistance movement, taking advantage as his position as director of the Société franco-belge to pass information whilst on business trips to Lille and Paris, and arrange the aerial bombing of the workshops of the franco-belge when a German locomotive was being serviced there.

In 1943 German counter intelligence located a radio transmitter of his resistance network, and twenty members of the network were arrested, including Bostsarron. After a secret trial by the special tribunal of the 65 Corps of German Army he was shot at Fort Bondues (Bondues) on 20 January 1944.
