= Meza (rural locality) =

Meza (Russian: Меза) is the name of several rural localities in Kostroma Oblast, Russia.

== Modern localities ==
- Meza, Raslovskoye Settlement, Sudislavsky District, Kostroma Oblast, a railway station in Raslovskoye Settlement of Sudislavsky District; 57°48′N 41°25′E
- Meza, Sudislavskoye Settlement, Sudislavsky District, Kostroma Oblast, a village in Sudislavskoye Settlement of Sudislavsky District; 57°44′N 41°45′E

== Abolished localities ==
- Meza, Kostromskoy District, Kostroma Oblast, a khutor in Kuznetsovsky Selsoviet of Kostromskoy District; abolished on May 27, 2004
