= Marcel Tremblay =

Marcel Tremblay is the name of:

- Marcel Tremblay (Montreal politician), Union Montreal member of the City Council of Montreal and brother of Mayor Gérald Tremblay
- Marcel Tremblay (politician, born 1943) (1943–2021), Progressive Conservative member of the Canadian House of Commons, 1984–1993
- Marcel Tremblay (ice hockey) (1915–1980), retired ice hockey player
- Marcel Tremblay (speed skater) (born 1965), Canadian Olympic speed skater
