= Gilles Tremblay =

Gilles Tremblay may refer to:

- Gilles Tremblay (composer) (1932–2017), Canadian composer
- Gilles Tremblay (ice hockey) (1938–2014), retired Canadian ice hockey left winger
