= Segurado =

Segurado is a surname. Notable people with the surname include:

- Guillermo Segurado (1946–2024), Argentine rower
- Jorge Segurado (born 1960), Argentine rower
