= Christian Mejía =

Puerto Rican footballer (born 1989)

Christian Mejia
Personal information
- Full name: Christian Mejia
- Date of birth: 5 October 1989 (age 37)
- Place of birth: Queens, New York, United States
- Height: 5 ft 10 in (1.78 m)
- Position: Goalkeeper

College career
| Years | Team | Apps | (Gls) |
| 2008 | Dominican Chargers | 0 | (0) |
| 2009–2010 | Albany Great Danes | | |

International career^{‡}
| 2008 | Puerto Rico U-20 | 8 | (0) |
| 2010– | Puerto Rico | 1 | (0) |
- ‡ National team caps and goals as of 01:59, 11 December 2010 (UTC)

Christian Mejía was a Puerto Rican goalie and now a Living Environment teacher at MS 358. He used to play the for University of Albany.
