= Canton of Andrézieux-Bouthéon =

Coordinates: 45.53°N 4.26°E

- Canton
- Situation of the canton of Andrézieux-Bouthéon in the department of Loire
- Country: France
- Region: Auvergne-Rhône-Alpes
- Department: Loire
- No. of communes: {{{nbcomm}}}
- Population (2023): 46,193
- INSEE code: 4201

The canton of Andrézieux-Bouthéon is an administrative division of the Loire department, in eastern France. It was created at the French canton reorganisation which came into effect in March 2015. Its seat is in Andrézieux-Bouthéon.

It consists of the following communes:

1. Andrézieux-Bouthéon
2. Aveizieux
3. Bellegarde-en-Forez
4. Boisset-lès-Montrond
5. Chambœuf
6. Craintilleux
7. Cuzieu
8. Montrond-les-Bains
9. Rivas
10. Saint-André-le-Puy
11. Saint-Bonnet-les-Oules
12. Saint-Galmier
13. Unias
14. Veauche
15. Veauchette
