= Tatán Mejía =

Colombian freestyle motocross racer (born 1985)

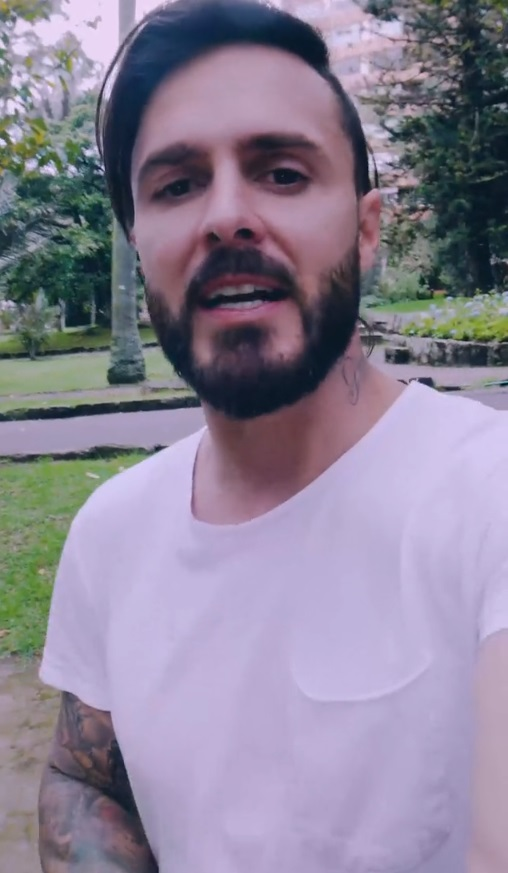

Sebastián Mejía Uribe (born 22 September 1985) better known as Tatán Mejía, is a Colombian freestyle motocross rider. He is South American champion in Ecuador and Latin American runner-up in Chile. He is the most outstanding athlete in his discipline in Colombia and one of the best in Latin America.

== Biography ==
Sebastián Mejía Uribe was born on 22 September 1985 in Manizales, the son of Alberto Mejía, a cattle rancher from Manizales, and Clemencia Uribe. At the age of 6, he started his sports career in bicycle racing, competing in races organized at his school. Mejía practiced this sport for more than seven years and was national runner-up on one occasion.

Mejía's first approach to motocross was thanks to a friend who competed in this sport, who lent Mejía his motorcycle to go for a ride around the track at his school. Mejía quickly discovered his passion for motorcycles and began to participate in races held in his city, standing out in several of them. When he started competing he didn't have his own motorcycle, but after begging his father for several years at the age of 14 his dad gave him his first professional motocross bike. He graduated from Gemelli School in Manizales and studied advertising; however, he does not practice this career but is dedicated to give freestyle shows in national and international events.

Mejía was chosen best Colombian rider from 2004 to 2010.
