= Fortress of Segura =

- Freguesia, Portugal
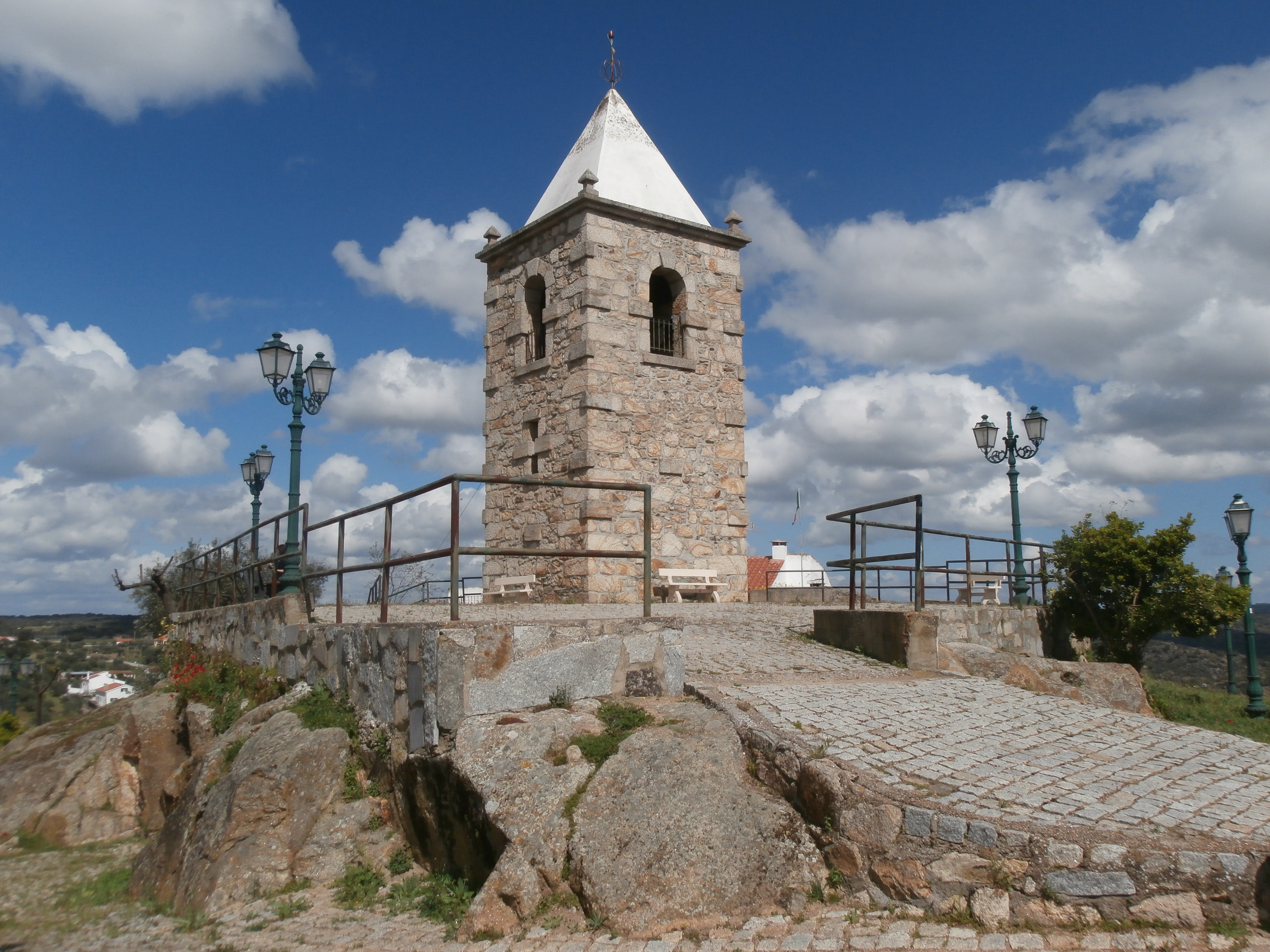
- Fortress of Segura

Location
- Coordinates: 39°49′36″N 6°58′48″W

The Fortress of Segura (Portuguese: Fortaleza de Segura) is a fortress in the civil parish of Segura, Portugal, municipality of Idanha-a-Nova, the Portuguese district of Castelo Branco. It is classified by IGESPAR as a Site of Public Interest.

== History ==
=== Background ===
The origins of the border fortification of Segura are obscure, the village only being mentioned in the early years of the Kingdom of Portugal. However, its definitive possession by the Crown of Portugal only took effect in 1282.

=== The medieval castle ===
The first reference to the castle dates from the reign of Denis of Portugal (1279-1325), when, on 20 August 1299, the sovereign exempted its residents from the taxes traditionally paid in civil parish Salvaterra do Extremo, on condition that a castle be built. Twenty years later, the monarch donated the domains of the village and its castle to the Military Order of Christ, which established a commendation here, proof that, at this stage, Segura was already an expressive regional center.

Under the reign of Ferdinand I of Portugal (1367-1383), the sovereign donated the domains of the village and its castle to Frei Nuno Martins (1376). During this period, the construction of a barbican began, a defense that was articulated with a moat.

Later, under Manuel I of Portugal (1495-1521), is figured by Duarte de Armas (Book of Fortresses, c. 1509). The village was elevated to town and county seat in 1510, a position it enjoyed until 1836, when it was annexed to the municipality of Salvaterra do Extremo.

=== War of Restoration to the present day ===
In the context of the Portuguese Restoration of independence War, the village and its fortification regained strategic importance on the border of Beira Baixa Province. For this reason, its defenses were reformulated, with the town being endowed with a surrounding wall, bastioned.

This defense was insufficient to stop the French invasion, which penetrated through this border during the Peninsular War, in 1807. Later, in 1846, its military government was extinguished, which led to the dismantling of the defenses, absorbed since then by urban progress.

At the beginning of the 20th century the clock tower was erected, today referred to as a reminder of Segura's military past, although without connection to it. The remainders of the defensive set are classified as Property of Public Interest by Decree published on 8 May 1959.
