= Juan José Segura-Egea =

Spanish physician

- Citizenship: Spanish
- Known for: Research into Endodontic Medicine and Antibiotics
- Scientific career
- Fields: Dentistry
- Workplaces: University of Seville

Juan J. Segura-Egea is a Spanish physician who is Professor of Endodontics in University of Seville. He is best known for developing endodontic medicine, which studies the relationships between systemic pathologies, such as diabetes, cardiovascular disease or smoking., with apical periodontitis and root canal treatment. He is a Certified Member of the European Society of Endodontology (ESE) and vice president of the Odontologic Sciences Academy of Spain.

== Academics ==
He was born in Jaen (Andalucía, Spain) in 1959. He got the degree in Medicine in 1982 from the University of Seville. He received his PhD degree in 1991 from Dpt. of Biochemistry and Molecular Biology, University of Sevilla, Spain. He got the degree in Dentistry at the same University in 1995.

Segura-Egea has authored more than 120 papers in international peer reviewed journals (H index = 33) and more than 200 papers in other scientific journals. He has directed 20 doctoral thesis. He has been editor of Endodoncia (since 2014), the official journal of the Spanish Endodontic Society (AEDE). He is Associated Editor of the Journal of Clinical and Experimental Dentistry, and member of the editorial board of the International Endodontic Journal

In 2022 he appeared in the Ranking of the World Scientists: World´s Top 2% Scientists in Odontology of Stanford University.

== Research lines ==
He is known for his research in endodontic medicine and antibiotics in the treatment of endodontic infections. He elaborated statement position paper of the ESE (European Society of Endodontology) on antibiotic therapy in infections of endodontic origin

== Most cited papers ==
- Jiménez-Pinzón, A.; Segura-Egea, J. J.; Poyato-Ferrera, M.; Velasco-Ortega, E.; Ríos-Santos, J. V. (March 2004). "Prevalence of apical periodontitis and frequency of root-filled teeth in an adult Spanish population". International Endodontic Journal. 37 (3): 167–173. doi:10.1111/j.0143-2885.2004.00759.x. PMID 15009405.
- Segura-Egea, J. J.; Jimenez-Pinzon, A.; Poyato-Ferrera, M.; Velasco-Ortega, E.; Rios-Santos, J. V. (August 2004). "Periapical status and quality of root fillings and coronal restorations in an adult Spanish population". International Endodontic Journal. 37 (8): 525–530. doi:10.1111/j.1365-2591.2004.00826.x. ISSN 0143-2885. PMID 15230905.
- Marin, Constanza; Segura-Egea, Juan J.; Martinez-Sahuquillo, Angel; Bullon, Pedro (March 2005). "Correlation between infant birth weight and mother's periodontal status". Journal of Clinical Periodontology. 32 (3): 299–304. doi:10.1111/j.1600-051X.2005.00661.x. ISSN 0303-6979. PMID 15766374.
- Segura-Egea, Jj.; Castellanos-Cosano, L.; Machuca, G.; Lopez-Lopez, J.; Martin-Gonzalez, J.; Velasco-Ortega, E.; Sanchez-Dominguez, B.; Lopez-Frias, Fj. (2012). "Diabetes mellitus, periapical inflammation and endodontic treatment outcome". Medicina Oral Patología Oral y Cirugia Bucal. 17 (2): e356–e361. doi:10.4317/medoral.17452. PMC 3448330. PMID 22143698.
- Poyato-Ferrera, M; Segura-Egea, Jj; Bullon-Fernandez, P (May 2003). "Comparison of modified Bass technique with normal toothbrushing practices for efficacy in supragingival plaque removal". International Journal of Dental Hygiene. 1 (2): 110–114. doi:10.1034/j.1601-5037.2003.00018.x. ISSN 1601-5029. PMID 16451532.
