= Saint-Bonnet-les-Oules =

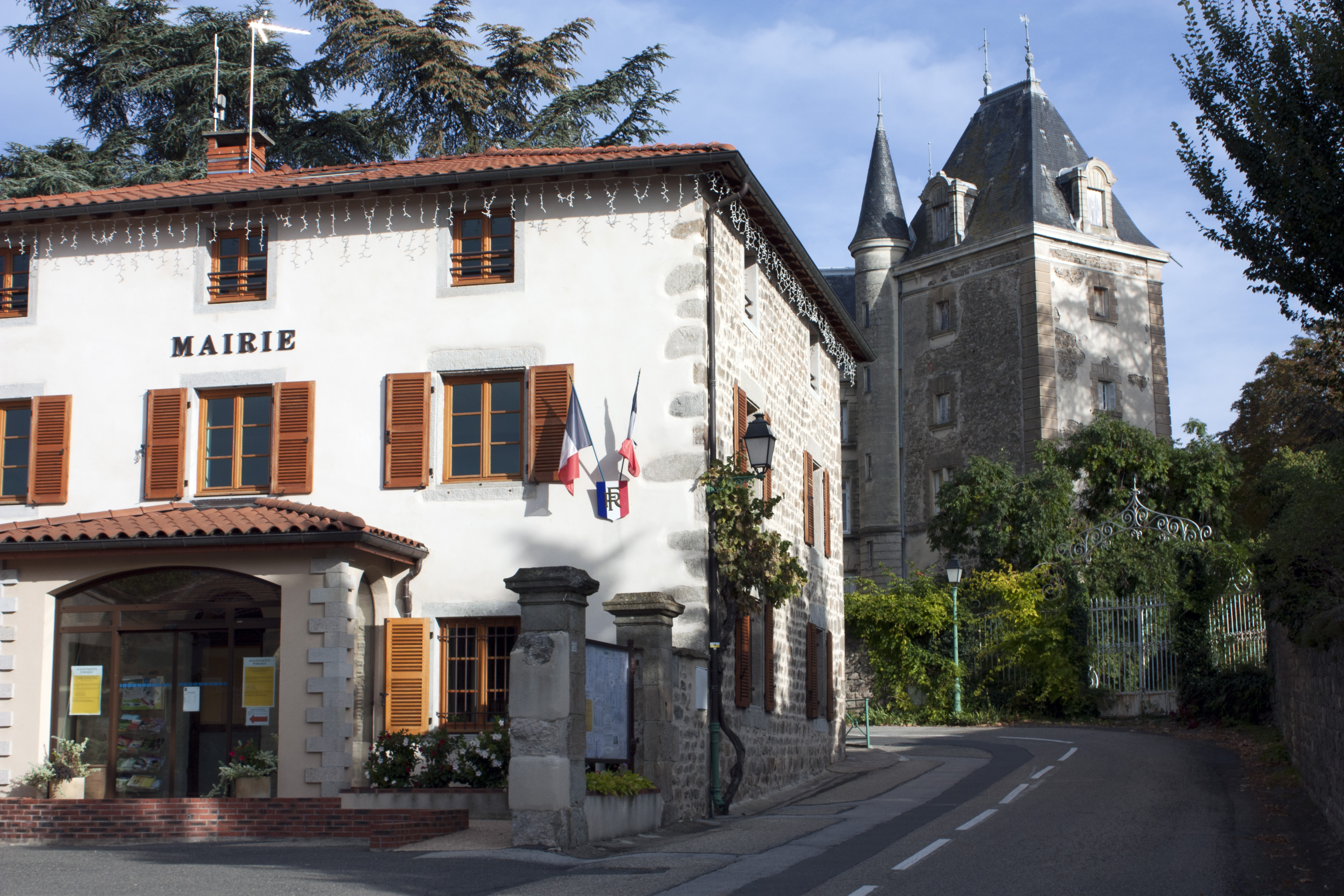
- Town hall

- Coat of arms
- Location of Saint-Bonnet-les-Oules
- Location within France Location within Auvergne-Rhône-Alpes
- Coordinates: 45°32′36″N 4°19′58″E
- Country: France
- Region: Auvergne-Rhône-Alpes
- Department: Loire
- Arrondissement: Montbrison
- Canton: Andrézieux-Bouthéon
- Intercommunality: Saint-Étienne Métropole

Government
  - Mayor (2020–2026): Guy Françon
- Area^{1}: 12.41 km^{2} (4.79 sq mi)
- Elevation: 475 m (1,558 ft)
- Highest elevation: 586 m (1,923 ft)
- Lowest elevation: 392 m (1,286 ft)
- Population (2023): 1,821
  - Density: 146.7/km^{2} (380.0/sq mi)
- Time zone: UTC+01:00 (CET)
  - Summer (DST): UTC+02:00 (CEST)
- INSEE/Postal code: 42206 /42330
- ^{1} French Land Register data, which excludes lakes, ponds, glaciers > 1 km^{2} (0.386 sq mi or 247 acres) and river estuaries.

Saint-Bonnet-les-Oules (French pronunciation: [sɛ̃ bɔnɛ le.z‿ul]) is a commune in the Loire department in central France.

== Population ==
Historical population
Year	Pop.	±% p.a.
1968	416	—
1975	618	+5.82%
1982	889	+5.33%
1990	982	+1.25%
1999	1,257	+2.78%
2007	1,483	+2.09%
2012	1,543	+0.80%
2017	1,638	+1.20%
2023	1,821	+1.78%
Source: INSEE

== See also ==
- Communes of the Loire department
