= Aveizieux =

Aveizieux Avèsiô (Arpitan)
- Commune
- Coat of arms
- Location of Aveizieux
- Location within France Location within Auvergne-Rhône-Alpes
- Coordinates: 45°33′57″N 4°22′22″E
- Country: France
- Region: Auvergne-Rhône-Alpes
- Department: Loire
- Arrondissement: Montbrison
- Canton: Andrézieux-Bouthéon
- Intercommunality: CC Forez-Est

Government
  - Mayor (2020–2026): Sylvain Dardouillier
- Area^{1}: 9.02 km^{2} (3.48 sq mi)
- Elevation: 593 m (1,946 ft)
- Highest elevation: 696 m (2,283 ft)
- Lowest elevation: 480 m (1,570 ft)
- Population (2023): 1,701
  - Density: 189/km^{2} (488/sq mi)
- Time zone: UTC+01:00 (CET)
  - Summer (DST): UTC+02:00 (CEST)
- INSEE/Postal code: 42010 /42330
- ^{1} French Land Register data, which excludes lakes, ponds, glaciers > 1 km^{2} (0.386 sq mi or 247 acres) and river estuaries.

Aveizieux (French pronunciation: [avɛzjø]; Arpitan: Avèsiô [a.ve.ˈzjø]) is a commune in the Loire department in central France.

== Population ==
Historical population
Year	Pop.	±% p.a.
1968	781	—
1975	810	+0.52%
1982	1,023	+3.39%
1990	1,175	+1.75%
1999	1,271	+0.88%
2007	1,386	+1.09%
2012	1,513	+1.77%
2017	1,647	+1.71%
2023	1,701	+0.54%
Source: INSEE

== See also ==
- Communes of the Loire department
