= Mary Valverde =

Mary Valverde (born 1975) is a Queens-born Latina artist who lives, works, and teaches in New York. She is a cultural practitioner who is invested in ritual, the quotidian, and syncretic relationships rooted in a basis of research and socially implicit trans-physics. Valverde has served on the Public Design Commission of the City of New York since 2015.

== Early life and education ==
Mary Valverde was born in Queens, NY and has continued to live and work in New York for most of her life. She received her Bachelor of Fine Arts at the School of Visual Arts in 1999, followed by a Master of Fine Arts from the University of Pennsylvania in 2012. Valverde completed her Associates of Arts and Sciences from the Fashion Institute of Technology.

== Art ==
Mary Valverde is an interdisciplinary artist whose work is rooted in learning and sharing. Her work is primarily based in sculpture, drawing, and installation. She works often with quotidian materials such as paper, yarn, tape, and chalk interspersed with culturally charged materials such as cocoa butter, coffee, corn husks, and her body. Themes present in her work include memory, ritual, culture, and adornment. She is interested in chronicling, researching, and the systematic arrangement of objects. Her work gives form to patterns both natural and constructed, while creating tension and movement within space. These themes stem from an attraction to site-specificity and investigation of material and spatial properties. Much of her work deals with gestures of navigation and structures of memory.

Her installation work alludes to the recreation of mystical spaces related to sacrifices and elements that relate to the matter. Her pieces create a connection between form, mark making, and proportions that intend to describe the piece. Mary’s arrangements bring elements that create an appealing connection based on mathematical representations. Her compositional pieces register, itemize and catalog patterns as well as study of ways that works of art are empowered to fill space, the individual as a whole and its psychology.

The concept of time and space is very present in her work, which is translated through the creation of marks and prints in her drawings, photographs, installations and performances. Valverde writes: “There is a consistent balance of action and restraint, freedom and limitation, and attraction and resistance that plays out in all of my work. I try to maintain a sense of immediacy and directness by a fusion of process, material and the body. I employ the innate qualities of malleable and ephemeral materials (sometimes ink, string, fabric, cotton, wire, oil, water, coffee, cocoa butter etc.) to examine the politics of production, exploitation, social roles, culture and tradition. Working in series has forced a continuous focus and understanding of myself in relation to the act of making."

== Teaching ==
Mary Valverde teaches at Hunter College, York College, and Cooper Union School of Art. She has lectured at various institutions, including the Stanford University and Long Island University's MFA departments.

== Exhibitions and awards ==
Valverde is the recipient of both University of Pennsylvania's Graduate School of Design's Full Dean's Diversity Fellowship, and the 2010 Artist Fellowship, Inc. Individual Artist Award. She received the Mayer Foundation Grant the same year, and was the MFA Lecturer at the ICA Philadelphia in 2011. She was chosen as Thomas Hunter Ceramic Artist in Residence in 2014, Artist Alliance Rotating Studio Program in Lower Manhattan for 2008, artist in residence at Artist Alliance Residency 2007, and Aljira Center for Contemporary Art's Emerge Program in 2006. Valverde has exhibited her work at a diverse range of venues, including MoCA North Miami, The New Jersey State Museum, BRAC, Art Center South Florida, El Museo del Barrio, The Queens Museum of Art, Jersey City Museum, Momenta Gallery, Saltworks Gallery, Corridor Gallery, Rush Arts Gallery, Diaspora Vibe Gallery, Abrons Art Center, Cuchifritos Gallery, Aferro Gallery, and Tribes Gallery. Valverde has also contributed to various projects through her involvement with the BASE collective. She has served as Commissioner (Sculptor seat), of the Public Design Commission of the City of New York since 2015.
