= Craintilleux =

- Commune
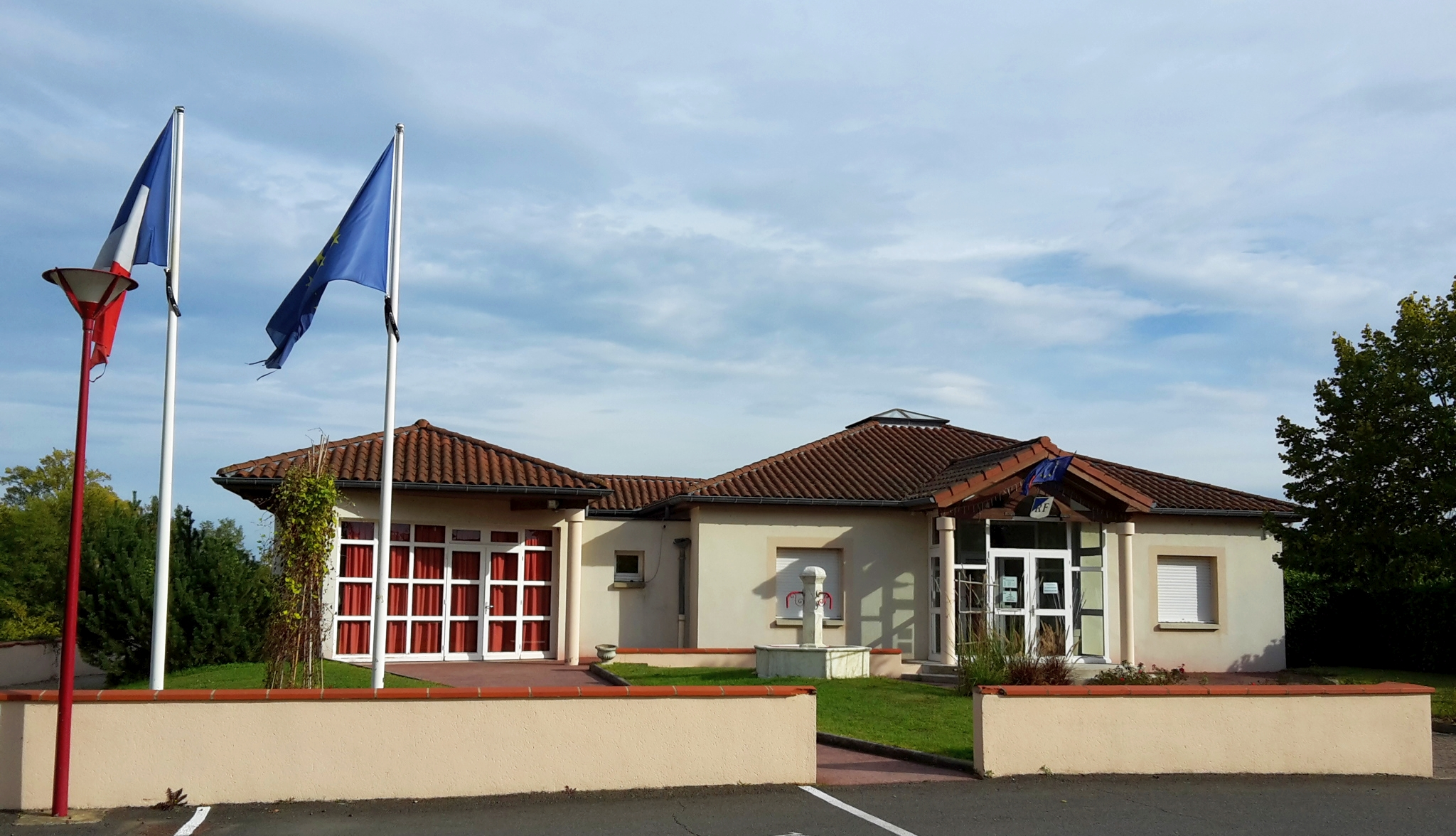
- Town hall
- Location of Craintilleux
- Location within France Location within Auvergne-Rhône-Alpes
- Coordinates: 45°35′03″N 4°14′07″E
- Country: France
- Region: Auvergne-Rhône-Alpes
- Department: Loire
- Arrondissement: Montbrison
- Canton: Andrézieux-Bouthéon
- Intercommunality: CA Loire Forez

Government
  - Mayor (2020–2026): Georges Thomas
- Area^{1}: 8.22 km^{2} (3.17 sq mi)
- Elevation: 353 m (1,158 ft)
- Highest elevation: 379 m (1,243 ft)
- Lowest elevation: 348 m (1,142 ft)
- Population (2023): 1,342
  - Density: 163/km^{2} (423/sq mi)
- Time zone: UTC+01:00 (CET)
  - Summer (DST): UTC+02:00 (CEST)
- INSEE/Postal code: 42075 /42210
- ^{1} French Land Register data, which excludes lakes, ponds, glaciers > 1 km^{2} (0.386 sq mi or 247 acres) and river estuaries.

Craintilleux (French pronunciation: [kʁɛ̃tijø]) is a commune in the Loire department in central France.

== Population ==
Historical population
Year	Pop.	±% p.a.
1968	322	—
1975	403	+3.26%
1982	668	+7.49%
1990	752	+1.49%
1999	900	+2.02%
2007	1,108	+2.63%
2012	1,205	+1.69%
2017	1,328	+1.96%
2023	1,342	+0.17%
Source: INSEE

== See also ==
- Communes of the Loire department
