= Bellegarde-en-Forez =

- Commune
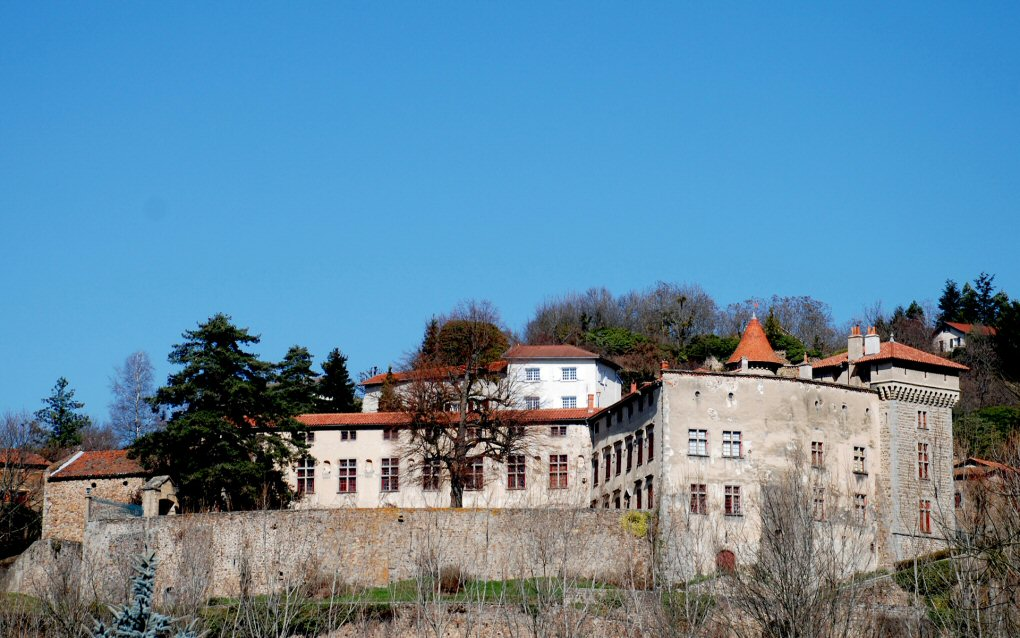
- Chateau
- Location of Bellegarde-en-Forez
- Location within France Location within Auvergne-Rhône-Alpes
- Coordinates: 45°38′53″N 4°17′56″E
- Country: France
- Region: Auvergne-Rhône-Alpes
- Department: Loire
- Arrondissement: Montbrison
- Canton: Andrézieux-Bouthéon

Government
  - Mayor (2020–2026): Jacques Laffont
- Area^{1}: 18.91 km^{2} (7.30 sq mi)
- Elevation: 406 m (1,332 ft)
- Highest elevation: 606 m (1,988 ft)
- Lowest elevation: 361 m (1,184 ft)
- Population (2023): 2,019
  - Density: 106.8/km^{2} (276.5/sq mi)
- Time zone: UTC+01:00 (CET)
  - Summer (DST): UTC+02:00 (CEST)
- INSEE/Postal code: 42013 /42210
- ^{1} French Land Register data, which excludes lakes, ponds, glaciers > 1 km^{2} (0.386 sq mi or 247 acres) and river estuaries.

Bellegarde-en-Forez (French pronunciation: [bɛlɡaʁd ɑ̃ fɔʁɛ], literally Bellegarde in Forez; Arpitan: Bèlagouârda) is a commune in the Loire department in central France.

== Population ==
Historical population
Year	Pop.	±% p.a.
1968	1,043	—
1975	1,081	+0.51%
1982	1,280	+2.44%
1990	1,283	+0.03%
1999	1,464	+1.48%
2007	1,806	+2.66%
2012	2,004	+2.10%
2017	2,004	+0.00%
2023	2,019	+0.12%
Source: INSEE

== See also ==
- Communes of the Loire department
