= Cuzieu, Loire =

Cuzieu Cusié (Arpitan)
- Commune
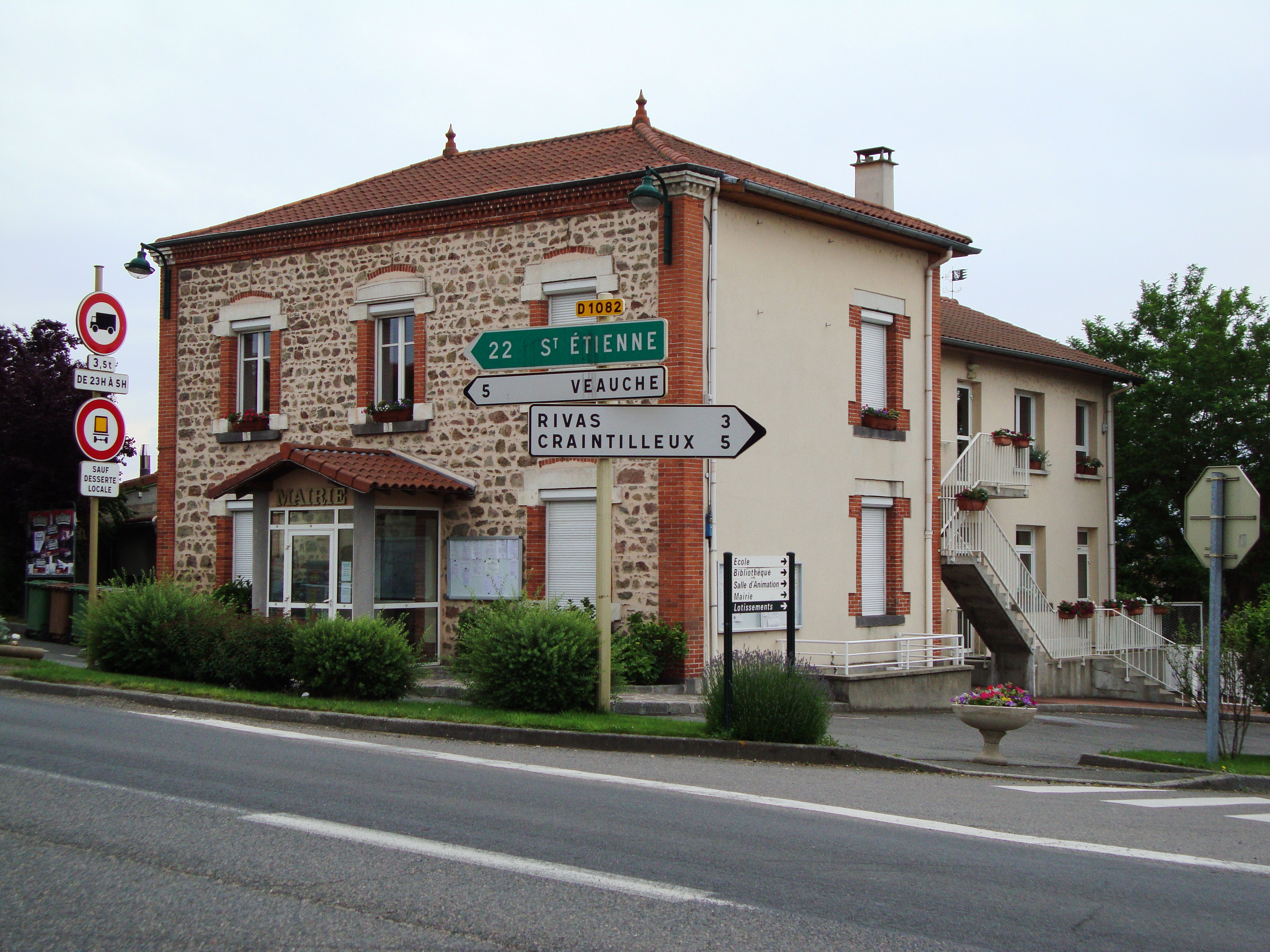
- Town hall

- Coat of arms
- Location of Cuzieu
- Location within France Location within Auvergne-Rhône-Alpes
- Coordinates: 45°36′36″N 4°15′43″E
- Country: France
- Region: Auvergne-Rhône-Alpes
- Department: Loire
- Arrondissement: Montbrison
- Canton: Andrézieux-Bouthéon
- Intercommunality: Forez-Est

Government
  - Mayor (2020–2026): Jean-François Rascle
- Area^{1}: 11.51 km^{2} (4.44 sq mi)
- Elevation: 342 m (1,122 ft)
- Highest elevation: 390 m (1,280 ft)
- Lowest elevation: 348 m (1,142 ft)
- Population (2023): 1,469
  - Density: 127.6/km^{2} (330.6/sq mi)
- Time zone: UTC+01:00 (CET)
  - Summer (DST): UTC+02:00 (CEST)
- INSEE/Postal code: 42081 /42330
- ^{1} French Land Register data, which excludes lakes, ponds, glaciers > 1 km^{2} (0.386 sq mi or 247 acres) and river estuaries.

Cuzieu (French pronunciation: [kyzjø]; Arpitan: Cusié [ky.ˈzi]) is a commune in the Loire department in central France.

== Population ==
Historical population
Year	Pop.	±% p.a.
1968	466	—
1975	585	+3.30%
1982	712	+2.85%
1990	1,155	+6.23%
1999	1,389	+2.07%
2007	1,490	+0.88%
2012	1,494	+0.05%
2017	1,525	+0.41%
2023	1,469	−0.62%
Source: INSEE

== See also ==
- Communes of the Loire department
