= Chambœuf, Loire =

Chambœuf
- Commune
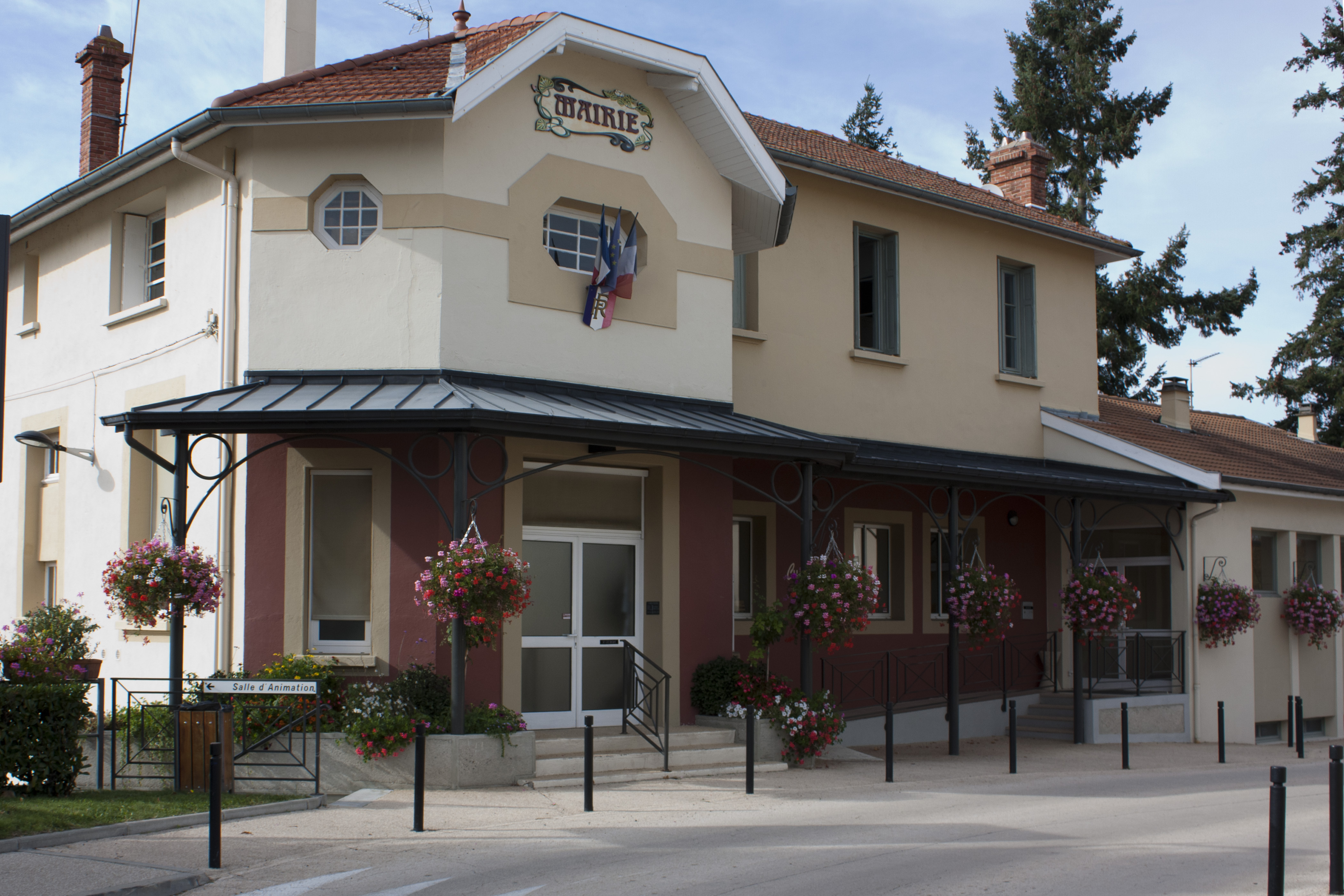
- Town hall
- Location of Chambœuf
- Location within France Location within Auvergne-Rhône-Alpes
- Coordinates: 45°34′44″N 4°19′16″E
- Country: France
- Region: Auvergne-Rhône-Alpes
- Department: Loire
- Arrondissement: Montbrison
- Canton: Andrézieux-Bouthéon
- Intercommunality: Saint-Étienne Métropole

Government
  - Mayor (2020–2026): André Charbonnier
- Area^{1}: 11.12 km^{2} (4.29 sq mi)
- Elevation: 431 m (1,414 ft)
- Highest elevation: 545 m (1,788 ft)
- Lowest elevation: 366 m (1,201 ft)
- Population (2023): 1,767
  - Density: 158.9/km^{2} (411.6/sq mi)
- Time zone: UTC+01:00 (CET)
  - Summer (DST): UTC+02:00 (CEST)
- INSEE/Postal code: 42043 /42330
- ^{1} French Land Register data, which excludes lakes, ponds, glaciers > 1 km^{2} (0.386 sq mi or 247 acres) and river estuaries.

Chambœuf (French pronunciation: [ʃɑ̃bœf]) is a commune in the Loire department in central France.

== Population ==
Historical population
Year	Pop.	±% p.a.
1968	445	—
1975	712	+6.94%
1982	866	+2.84%
1990	1,100	+3.03%
1999	1,358	+2.37%
2007	1,539	+1.58%
2012	1,551	+0.16%
2017	1,711	+1.98%
2023	1,767	+0.54%
Source: INSEE

== See also ==
- Communes of the Loire department
