= Montrond-les-Bains =

- Commune
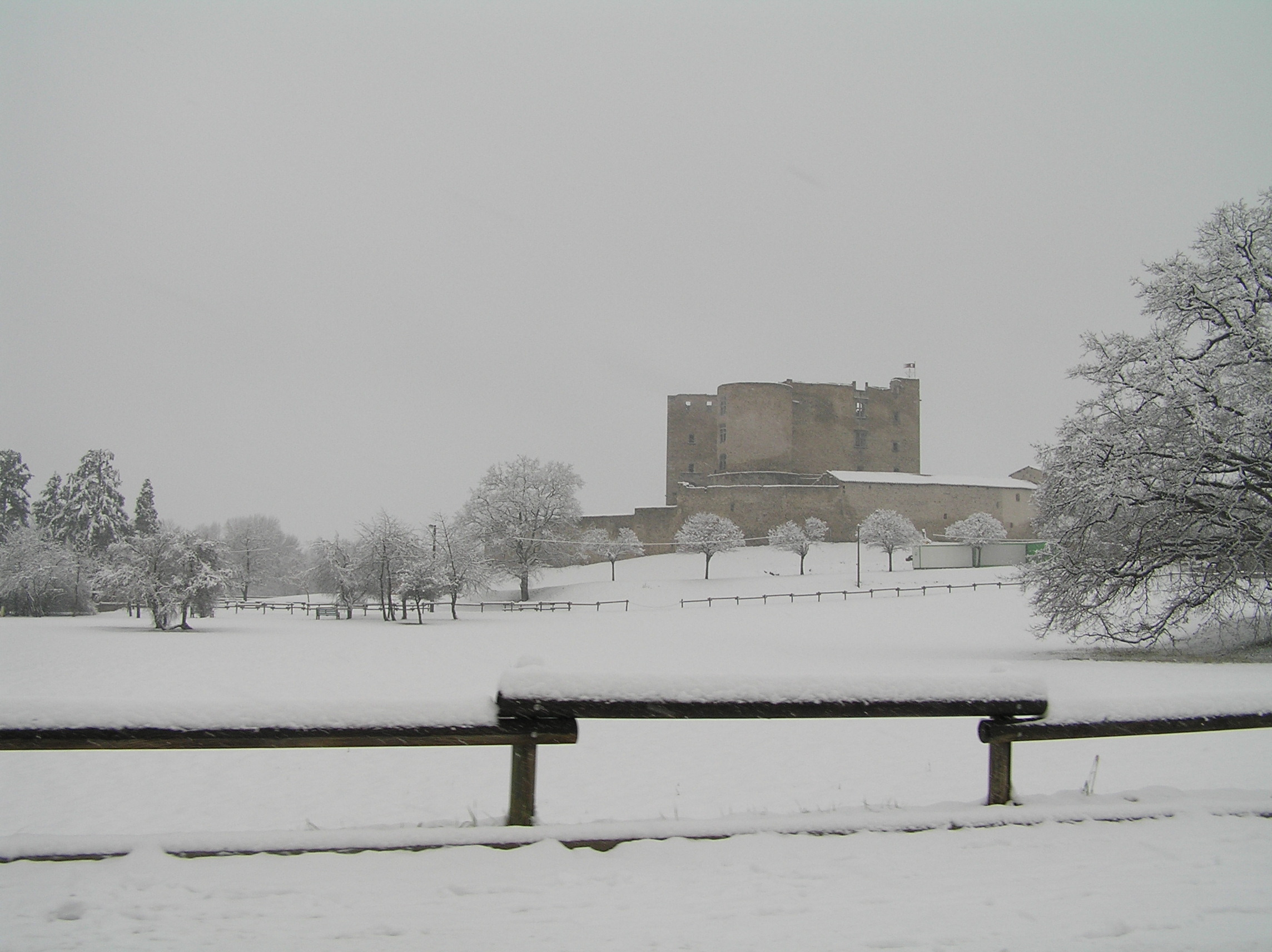
- Château de Montrond

- Coat of arms
- Location of Montrond-les-Bains
- Location within France Location within Auvergne-Rhône-Alpes
- Coordinates: 45°38′38″N 4°13′53″E
- Country: France
- Region: Auvergne-Rhône-Alpes
- Department: Loire
- Arrondissement: Montbrison
- Canton: Andrézieux-Bouthéon
- Intercommunality: Forez-Est

Government
  - Mayor (2020–2026): Serge Percet
- Area^{1}: 10.11 km^{2} (3.90 sq mi)
- Highest elevation: 369 m (1,211 ft)
- Lowest elevation: 333 m (1,093 ft)
- Population (2023): 5,652
  - Density: 559.1/km^{2} (1,448/sq mi)
- Time zone: UTC+01:00 (CET)
  - Summer (DST): UTC+02:00 (CEST)
- INSEE/Postal code: 42149 /42210
- ^{1} French Land Register data, which excludes lakes, ponds, glaciers > 1 km^{2} (0.386 sq mi or 247 acres) and river estuaries.

Montrond-les-Bains (French pronunciation: [mɔ̃ʁɔ̃ le bɛ̃]) is a commune in the Loire department in central France.

== Population ==
Historical population

Year	Pop.	±% p.a.
1793	450	—
1800	474	+0.75%
1806	447	−0.97%
1821	559	+1.50%
1831	656	+1.61%
1836	685	+0.87%
1841	708	+0.66%
1846	727	+0.53%
1851	718	−0.25%
1856	743	+0.69%
1861	750	+0.19%
1866	759	+0.24%
1872	734	−0.56%
1876	789	+1.82%
1881	811	+0.55%
1886	935	+2.89%
1891	920	−0.32%
1896	1,005	+1.78%
1901	993	−0.24%

Year	Pop.	±% p.a.
1906	999	+0.12%
1911	1,056	+1.12%
1921	1,009	−0.45%
1926	1,214	+3.77%
1931	1,505	+4.39%
1936	1,629	+1.60%
1946	1,729	+0.60%
1954	1,859	+0.91%
1962	1,927	+0.45%
1968	2,436	+3.98%
1975	2,714	+1.56%
1982	3,137	+2.09%
1990	3,627	+1.83%
1999	4,031	+1.18%
2007	4,635	+1.76%
2012	5,270	+2.60%
2017	5,302	+0.12%
2023	5,652	+1.07%

Source: EHESS and INSEE (1968-2023)

== See also ==
- Communes of the Loire department
