= Alvarado (surname) =

Alvarado is a Spanish surname. Notable people with the surname include:

- Angela Alvarado (born 1964), American actress and director, wife of Robi Rosa
- Atilano Cruz Alvarado (1901–?), saint of the Cristero War
- Carlos Alvarado President of Costa Rica (2018–2022)
- Carlos Alvarado-Larroucau (born 1964), writer
- Carmen Rivera de Alvarado (1910–1973), Puerto Rican social worker, educator and activist
- Daniel Alvarado (1949–2020), Venezuelan actor
- Elvis Alvarado (born 1999), Dominican baseball player
- Gonzalo de Alvarado y Contreras, 16th-century Spanish conquistador
- Jorge de Alvarado (died 1540s), y Contreras, conquistador
- José Alvarado (baseball) (born 1995), Venezuelan baseball pitcher
- Jose Alvarado (basketball) (born 1998), American professional basketball player
- Juan Bautista Alvarado (1809–1882), governor of Alta California (1836–1837, 1838–1842)
- Juan Carlos Alvarado (politician), Venezuelan politician
- Juan Carlos Alvarado (singer) (born 1964), Guatemalan christian singer
- Juan Velasco Alvarado (1910–1977), ruler of Peru
- Julio Alvarado Ruano (2002–2016), Guatemalan teenager killed in Belize
- Nicolas Alvarado (born 1944), Panamanian basketball player
- Olga Margarita Alvarado (born 1981), former vice president of Honduras
- Pedro de Alvarado (died 1541), Spanish conquistador and governor of Guatemala
- Pete Alvarado (1920–2003), American animator
- Roberto Alvarado (born 1998), Mexican footballer
- Rosana Alvarado (born 1977), Ecuadorian politician
- Rudecindo Alvarado (1792–1872), Argentine general
- Salvador Alvarado (1880–1924), Mexican politician and soldier
- Trini Alvarado (born 1967), actress
- DJ Trevi (born 1990), born Treavor Alvarado, American actor, director, DJ, music producer, and DP

== See also ==
- Alvarado family - conquistadors
- Alvarado wrestling family
