= Rivas, Loire =

Rivas
- Commune
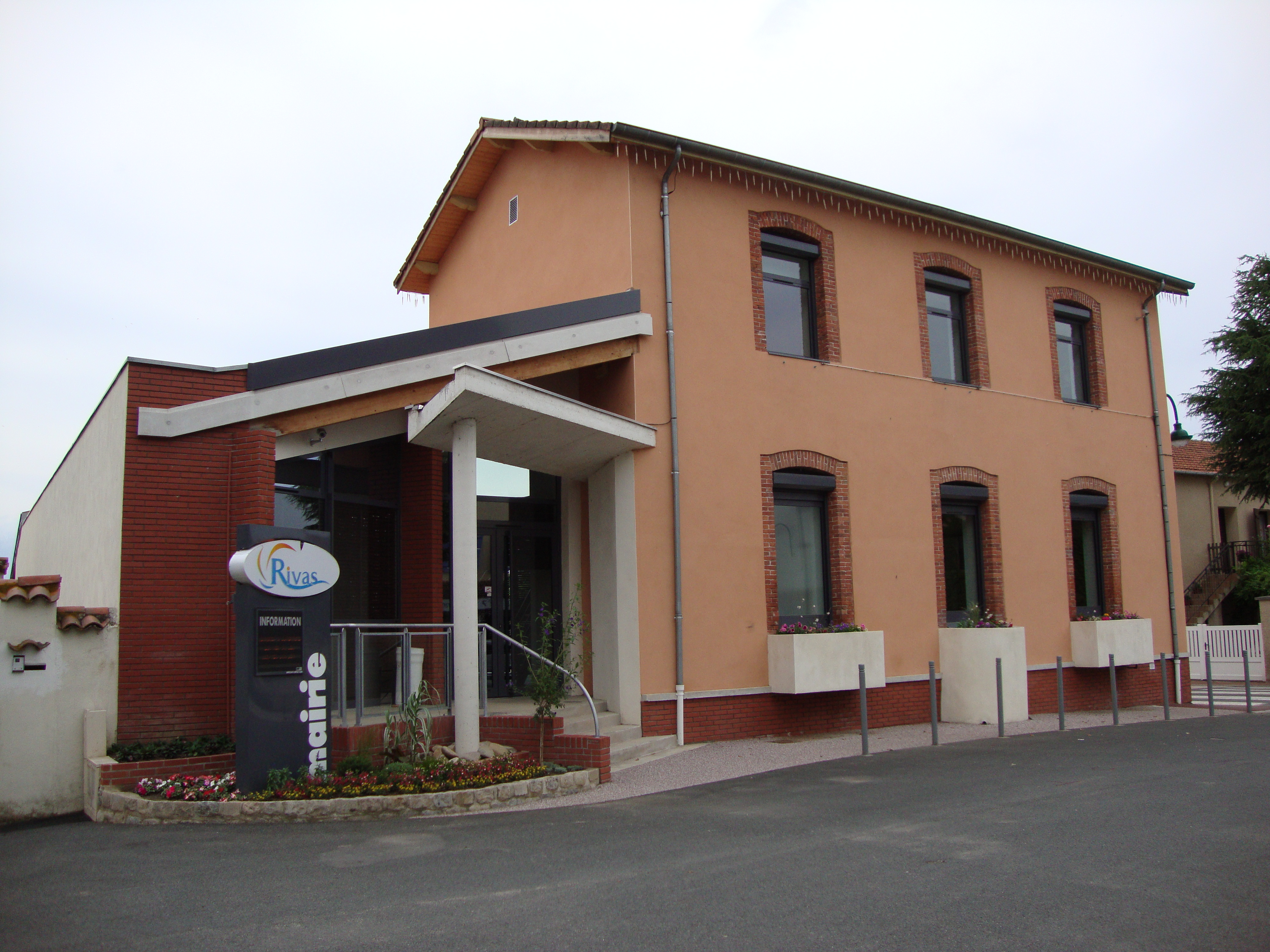
- Town hall
- Location of Rivas
- Location within France Location within Auvergne-Rhône-Alpes
- Coordinates: 45°35′12″N 4°14′56″E
- Country: France
- Region: Auvergne-Rhône-Alpes
- Department: Loire
- Arrondissement: Montbrison
- Canton: Andrézieux-Bouthéon
- Intercommunality: Forez-Est

Government
  - Mayor (2020–2026): Bruno Chalayer
- Area^{1}: 4.6 km^{2} (1.8 sq mi)
- Elevation: 358 m (1,175 ft)
- Highest elevation: 390 m (1,280 ft)
- Lowest elevation: 349 m (1,145 ft)
- Population (2023): 747
  - Density: 160/km^{2} (420/sq mi)
- Time zone: UTC+01:00 (CET)
  - Summer (DST): UTC+02:00 (CEST)
- INSEE/Postal code: 42185 /42340
- ^{1} French Land Register data, which excludes lakes, ponds, glaciers > 1 km^{2} (0.386 sq mi or 247 acres) and river estuaries.

Rivas is a commune in the Loire department in central France.

== Population ==
Historical population
Year	Pop.	±% p.a.
1968	163	—
1975	177	+1.18%
1982	212	+2.61%
1990	397	+8.16%
1999	406	+0.25%
2007	494	+2.48%
2012	531	+1.46%
2017	663	+4.54%
2023	747	+2.01%
Source: INSEE

== See also ==
- Communes of the Loire department
