= Veauche =

- Commune
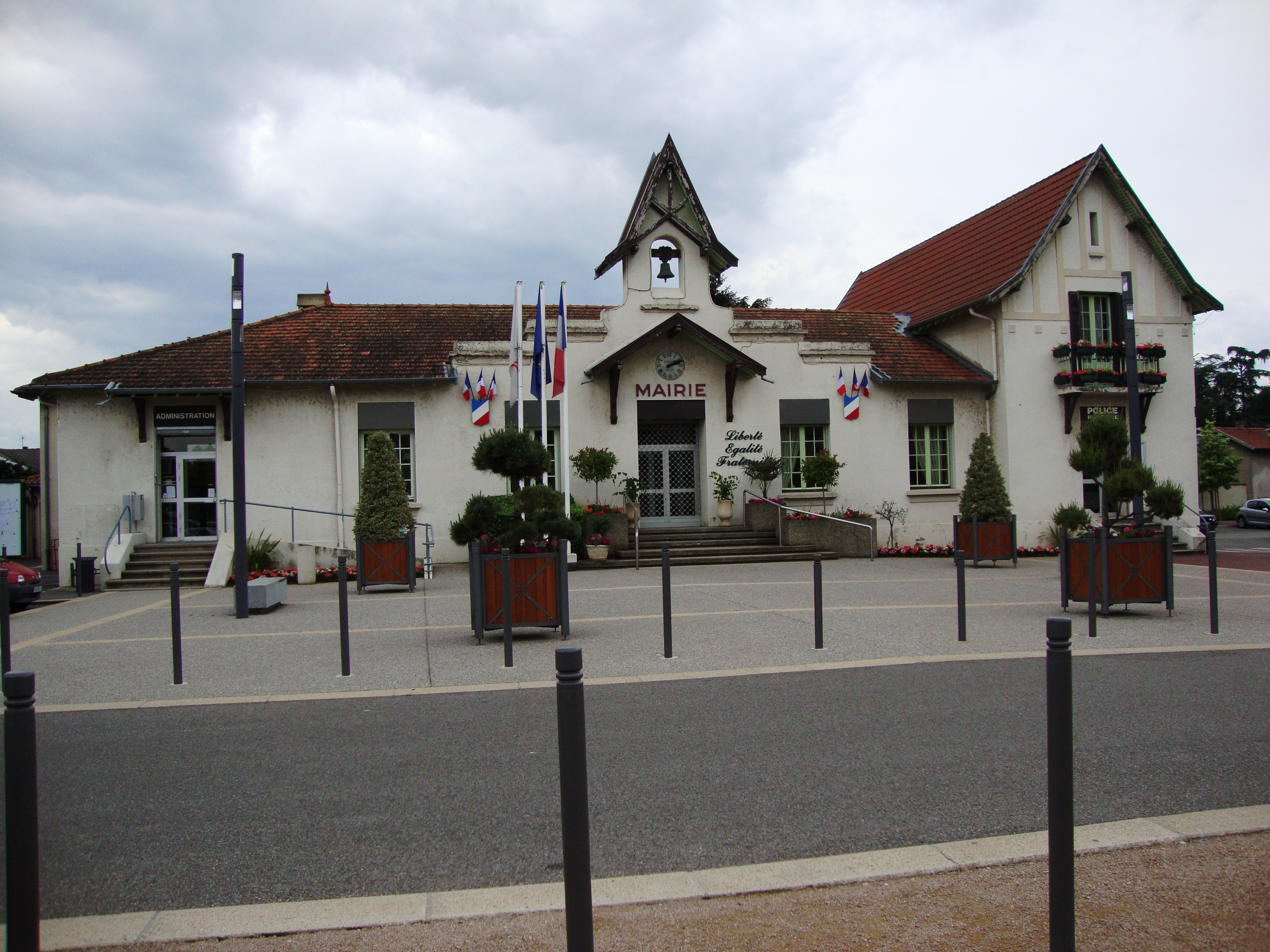
- Town hall

- Coat of arms
- Location of Veauche
- Location within France Location within Auvergne-Rhône-Alpes
- Coordinates: 45°33′46″N 4°16′43″E
- Country: France
- Region: Auvergne-Rhône-Alpes
- Department: Loire
- Arrondissement: Montbrison
- Canton: Andrézieux-Bouthéon

Government
  - Mayor (2020–2026): Gérard Dubois
- Area^{1}: 10.41 km^{2} (4.02 sq mi)
- Elevation: 377 m (1,237 ft)
- Highest elevation: 406 m (1,332 ft)
- Lowest elevation: 348 m (1,142 ft)
- Population (2023): 8,975
  - Density: 862.2/km^{2} (2,233/sq mi)
- Time zone: UTC+01:00 (CET)
  - Summer (DST): UTC+02:00 (CEST)
- INSEE/Postal code: 42323 /42340
- ^{1} French Land Register data, which excludes lakes, ponds, glaciers > 1 km^{2} (0.386 sq mi or 247 acres) and river estuaries.

Veauche (French pronunciation: [voʃ]; Arpitan: Viôche) is a commune in the Loire department in central France.

It is 20 km (12 mi) from Saint-Etienne and is bordered on the west by the Loire River.

== Population ==
Historical population

Year	Pop.	±% p.a.
1793	500	—
1800	366	−4.36%
1806	416	+2.16%
1821	512	+1.39%
1831	485	−0.54%
1836	577	+3.53%
1841	574	−0.10%
1846	540	−1.21%
1851	663	+4.19%
1856	678	+0.45%
1861	747	+1.96%
1866	780	+0.87%
1872	685	−2.14%
1876	701	+0.58%
1881	748	+1.31%
1886	1,620	+16.71%
1891	1,885	+3.08%
1896	2,130	+2.47%
1901	2,479	+3.08%

Year	Pop.	±% p.a.
1906	2,485	+0.05%
1911	2,660	+1.37%
1921	2,279	−1.53%
1926	2,511	+1.96%
1931	2,770	+1.98%
1936	2,563	−1.54%
1946	2,325	−0.97%
1954	2,586	+1.34%
1962	2,874	+1.33%
1968	3,197	+1.79%
1975	4,027	+3.35%
1982	5,706	+5.10%
1990	7,282	+3.10%
1999	8,061	+1.14%
2007	8,307	+0.38%
2012	8,619	+0.74%
2017	8,984	+0.83%
2023	8,975	−0.02%

Source: EHESS and INSEE (1968–2023)

== See also ==
- Communes of the Loire department
