= Le Laboureur =

Le Laboureur may refer to:

== People with the surname ==
- Claude Le Laboureur (1601–1680s), French Roman Catholic clergyman and historian
- Jean Le Laboureur (1621–1675), French courtier, Roman Catholic clergyman and historian
- Louis Le Laboureur (1615–1679), French poet
