= Abbey of the Île Barbe =

Abbey in Lyon Metropolis, France

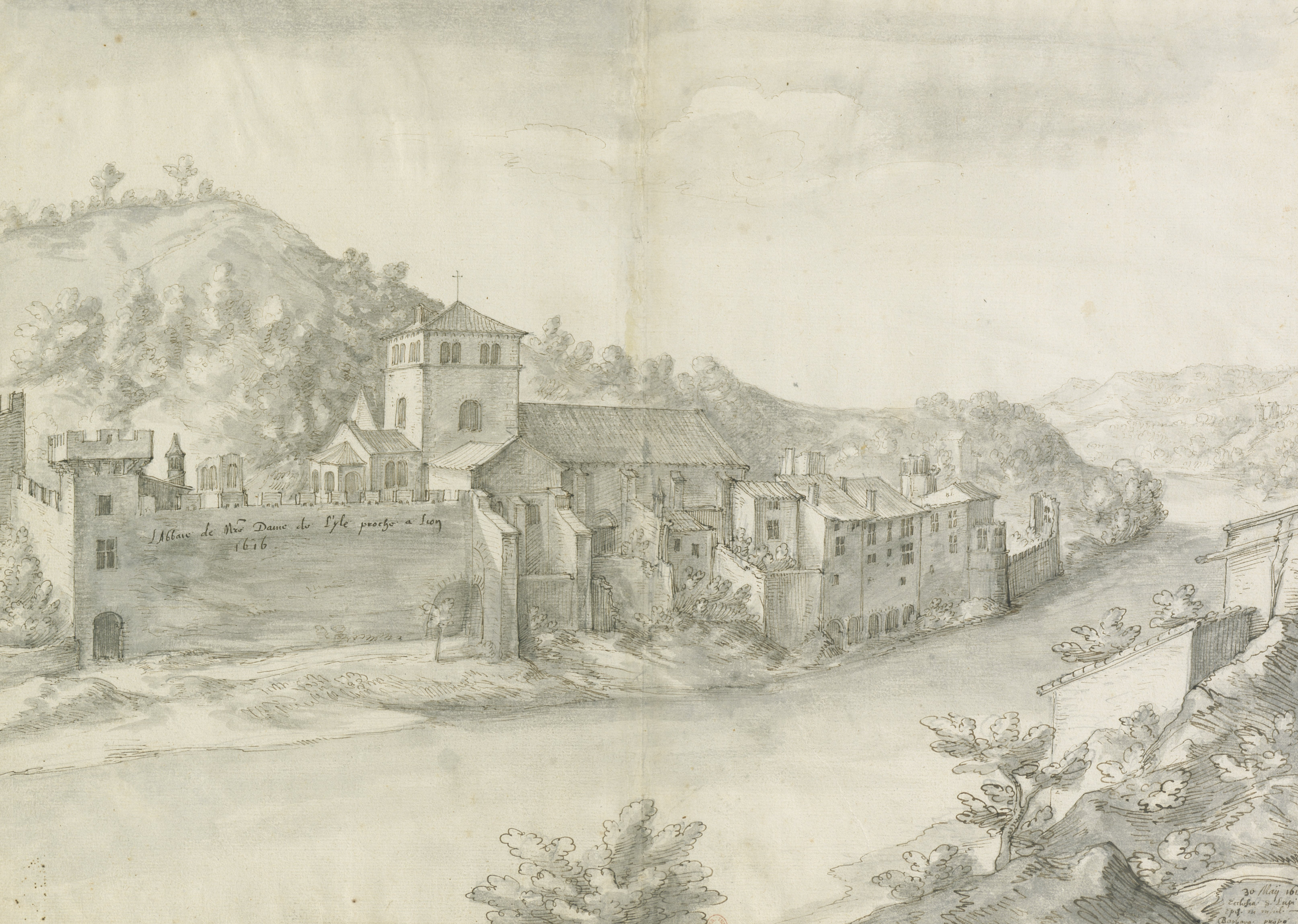
- The Abbey of the Île Barbe in 1616.

- Location within France

Monastery information
- Other names: Abbaye de l'Île Barbe, Abbaye Saint-Martin de l'Île-Barbe
- Order: Benedictine
- Established: 5th century AD
- Disestablished: 1549

Site
- Location: Île Barbe, Lyon, France
- Coordinates: 45.797°N 4.832°E
- Other information: (Monument historique)

The Abbey of the Île Barbe (French: Abbaye de l'Île-Barbe) was a monastery, later a Benedictine abbey, built very early in the Christian era, on the Île Barbe, outside of Lyon, France.

== History ==
The monastery was founded on the island in the 5th century as a community of hermits and was the first monastic establishment in the Lyon region and one of the oldest in Gaul. Charlemagne endowed it with a beautiful library.

In the 7th century the monastery founded the priory of Saint Rambert at what became known as Saint-Rambert-sur-Loire, now Saint-Just-Saint-Rambert.

The monastery was looted several times (in 676, and in 725 by the Saracens and in 937 by Huns). It adopted the Rule of St. Benedict in the 9th century and gradually became wealthy. In 816, Louis the Pious granted the monastery the right at any time of three ships on the Saone, the Rhone and the Doubs free of taxes, and a decree of immunity and protection which was confirmed by Charles the Bald in 614.

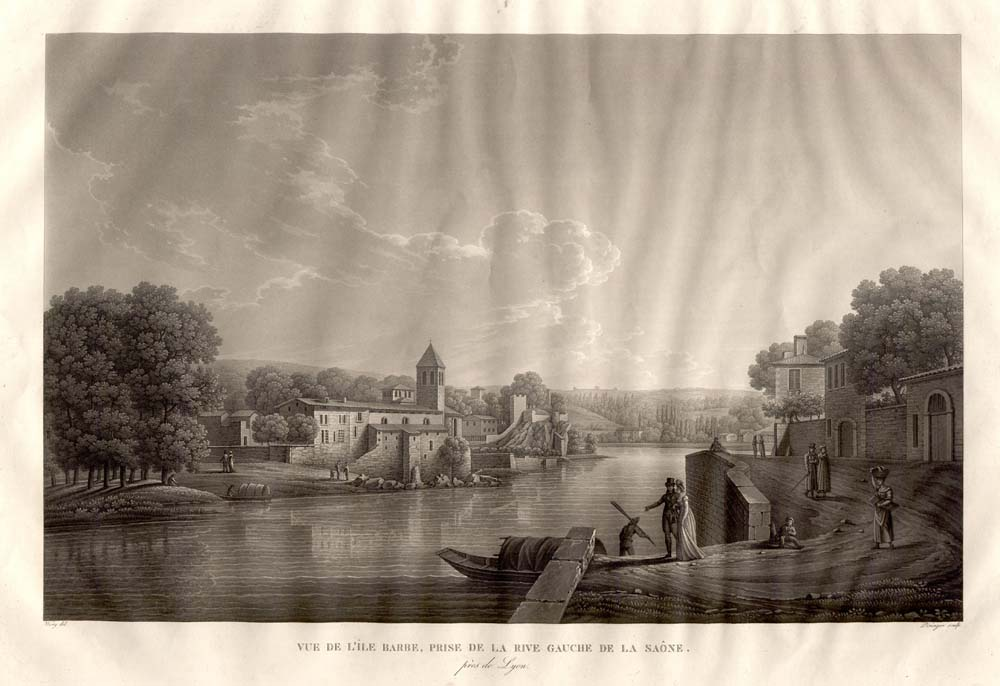
The abbey in 1819

In the early 16th century, the abbey came into the possession in commendam of the family of d'Albon. In 1549, Pope Paul III secularised it, replacing the monks by a college of canons. In 1562, the abbey was devastated and burned by the Protestant troops of the Baron des Adrets.

In 1741, Pierre Guérin de Tencin, archbishop of Lyon, merged the canons into the cathedral chapter of Lyon Cathedral. In 1745 the seminary of Saint-Pothin, created in 1737 for aged and infirm priests, was moved into the empty premises. This was suppressed in its turn in 1782 and the buildings were returned to the ownership of the cathedral chapter. During the French Revolution, on 23 March 1793, everything was nationalised, sold and dispersed.

The historian and philosopher Gabriel Bonnot de Mably (1709–1785) was a canon in the abbey church.

== List of abbots ==
- 5th century: Saint Dorotheus
- ???-??? : Philetus
- ???-??? : Julien
- ???-??? : Christophe
- ???-??? : Antoine I
- ???-??? : Martin
- ???-??? : Aigobert
- ???-??? : Astorg I
- ???-??? : Maxime
- ???-??? : Ambroise
- ???-??? : Loup
- ???-??? : Maximin
- ???-??? : Bligigaire
- ???-??? : Vinfrid
- ???-??? : Rotfred
- ???-??? : Garland
- ???-??? : Licinius
- ???-??? : Saint Benoît I
- ???-??? : Campion
- ???-??? : Alaric
- ???-??? : Bartholomée
- ???-??? : Argeric
- ???-861 : Herbert
- 861-8?? : Gundramnus
- 8??-8?? : Norbert
- 8??-8?? : Varengard
- 8??-876 : Garlarin
- 876-8?? : Léobon
- 8??-??? : Astorg II
- ???-??? : Étienne
- ???-??? : Elgedis
- ???-??? : Antoine II
- ???-??? : Halinand
- ???-??? : Romuald
- ???-??? : Eudes
- ???-971 : Cumanus
- 971-994 : Heldebert
- 994-1007 : Benoît II
- 1007-1008 : Bernard
- 1008-1055 : Garnier
- 1055-1070 : Humbert
- 1070-10?? : Ogier
- 10??-1096 : Clément
- 1096-1116 : Guy I
- 1116-1128 : Girin I
- 1128-11?? : Josserand
- 11??-11?? : Hugues I
- 11??-11?? : Olderic
- 11??-1150 : Guillaume I
- 1150-1152 : Girin II
- 1152-11?? : Saturnin
- 11??-1168 : Vicard
- 1161 : Hugues de Tournon (monk)
- 1168-1183 : Hugues II
- 1183-1198 : Guichard
- 1198-1200 : Gaucerand
- 1200-1222 : Guy II
- 1222-1224 : Bermond
- 1224-1243 : Guillaume II de Jarez
- 1243-1245 : Foulques
- 1245-1246 : Omer
- 1246-1250 : Pierre I
- 1249 : Zacharie de Talaru (monk)
- 1250 : Hugues de Varennes (monk and cellarer)
- 1250-1261 : Geoffroy de Vertelay
- 1256 : Zacharie de Talaru (monk)
- 1261 : Humbert de Vassailleu (monk)
- 1261-1270 : Pierre II de Vertelay
- 1270-1296 : Girin III de Sartines
- 1272 : Aymon de Vaux (prior)
- 1284-1440 : Hugues, Jean, Pierre & Pierre then Claude de Roncherol (monks)
- 1284 : Robert de Ryon (religious)
- 1296-1322 : André de Marzé
- 1300 : Estienne de Vego (monk)
- 1309 : Guigues de Roussillon (monk)
- 1322-1329 : Béraud I de Mercœur
- 1329-1334 : Pons de Guizeu
- 1334-13?? : Raymond de Beaufort
- 13??-13?? : Béraud II de La Baume
- 13??-1345 : Galbald
- 1345-134? : Simon de Gillans
- 134?-1350 : Bégon de Brossan
- 1350-1354 : Jean I Pilus-Fortis de Rabastens
- 1354-1372 : Guillaume III de Landore
- 1372-1394 : Pierre III de Villette
- 1383 : Pierre de Verriere (almoner)
- 1394-1400 : Jean II de Sonhetto
- 1400-1428 : Pierre IV de Thurey
- 1401 : Pierre de Verriere (almoner)
- 1411 : Faucerand du Saix (religious)
- 1419 : Antoine de Salornay (monk)
- 1421 : Faucerand du Saix (religious)
- 1421 : Jean Rostain (monk)
- 1428-1436 : Aynard de Cordon
- 1436 : Durand Vert (monk)
- 1436 : Berno de Vienne (monk)
- 1436 : Durand Vignols (religious)
- 1436-1458 : Claude I de Sotizon
- 1451 : Antoine de Rochefort la Valette (monk)
- 1452 : Jean de Vaugrigneuse (monk)
- 1453 : Eustache de Vaugrigneuse (monk)
- 1453 : Aynard de Villeneufve (cantor)
- 1455 : Guillaume de la Sale (monk)
- 1458-1485 : Edouard de Messey
- 1464 : André le Viste
- 1485-1488 : Cardinal Charles de Bourbon
- 1488-1500 : Henri de Seylac
- 1500 : Philibert Rosset (monk)
- 1507 : Guyllaume de Villeneufve (monk)
- 1500-1515 : Antoine III d'Albon de Saint-André
- 1500 : Jacques de Sassenage (religious)
- 1505 : Guillaume de Semur (religious and chamberlain)
- 1515-1525 : Antoine IV d'Albon de Saint-Forgeul
- 1525-1562 : Antoine V d'Albon de Saint-Forgeul
- 1550 : Claude Sautreau (monk and cantor)
- 1551 : Fleury de Salemard (religious)
- 1551 : Louis Vallier (monk)
- 1551 : Antoine de Vauselles (monk)
- 1562-1599 : Pierre V d'Espignac
- 1599-1609 : Jean III de Châtillon
- 1606-1613 : Claude II de Nérestang
- 1616-1620 : Antoine VI de Nérestang
- 1620-1693 : Camille de Neufville de Villeroy
- 1630-1660 : Claude Le Laboureur (provost of the chapter)
- 1693-1741 : Antoine VII de Thélis de Saint-Cyr de Valorges

== Possessions ==
Partial list of possessions held in its own name or in fee by the abbey:

=== Lyonnais ===
- fief and lands of Pollet, near Villefranche
- Château de Lignieux, at Saint-Jean-de-Thurigneux (1186–1665)
- Château de Miribel, at Miribel

=== Jarez ===
- Cell of Saint-Martin at Firminy (971)
- Church of Saint-Pierre "in Amodo" (possibly Saint-Chamond) (971)
- Church of Tartaras (1168–1183 – c. 1225)
- Church of Saint-Romain-en-Jarez (1168–1183 – c. 1225)
- Church of Saint-Paul-en-Cornillon (1225)
- Chapel of the Château de Grangent (1183)
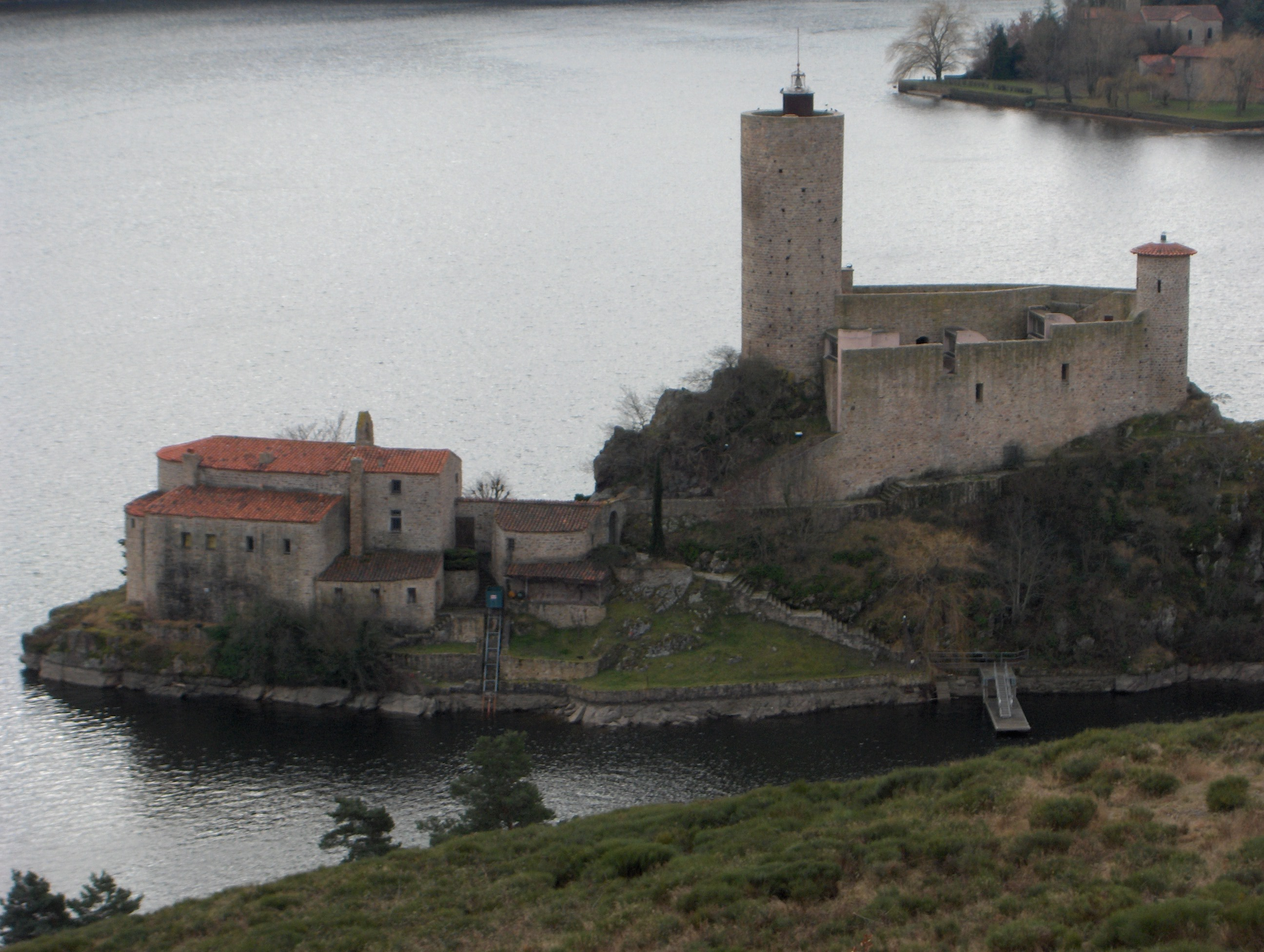
Château de Grangent with chapel
- Church of Saint-Julien at La Tour-en-Jarez (1183), dependent on the priory of Saint-Rambert (c. 1225)
- Church of Saint-Martin at La Fouillouse (1183), dependent on the priory of Saint-Rambert (c. 1225)
- Church of Bouthéon (1183), dependent on the priory of Saint-Rambert (c. 1225)
- Church of Saint-Clément at Le Chambon-Feugerolles (1183), dependent on Saint-Martin, Firminy
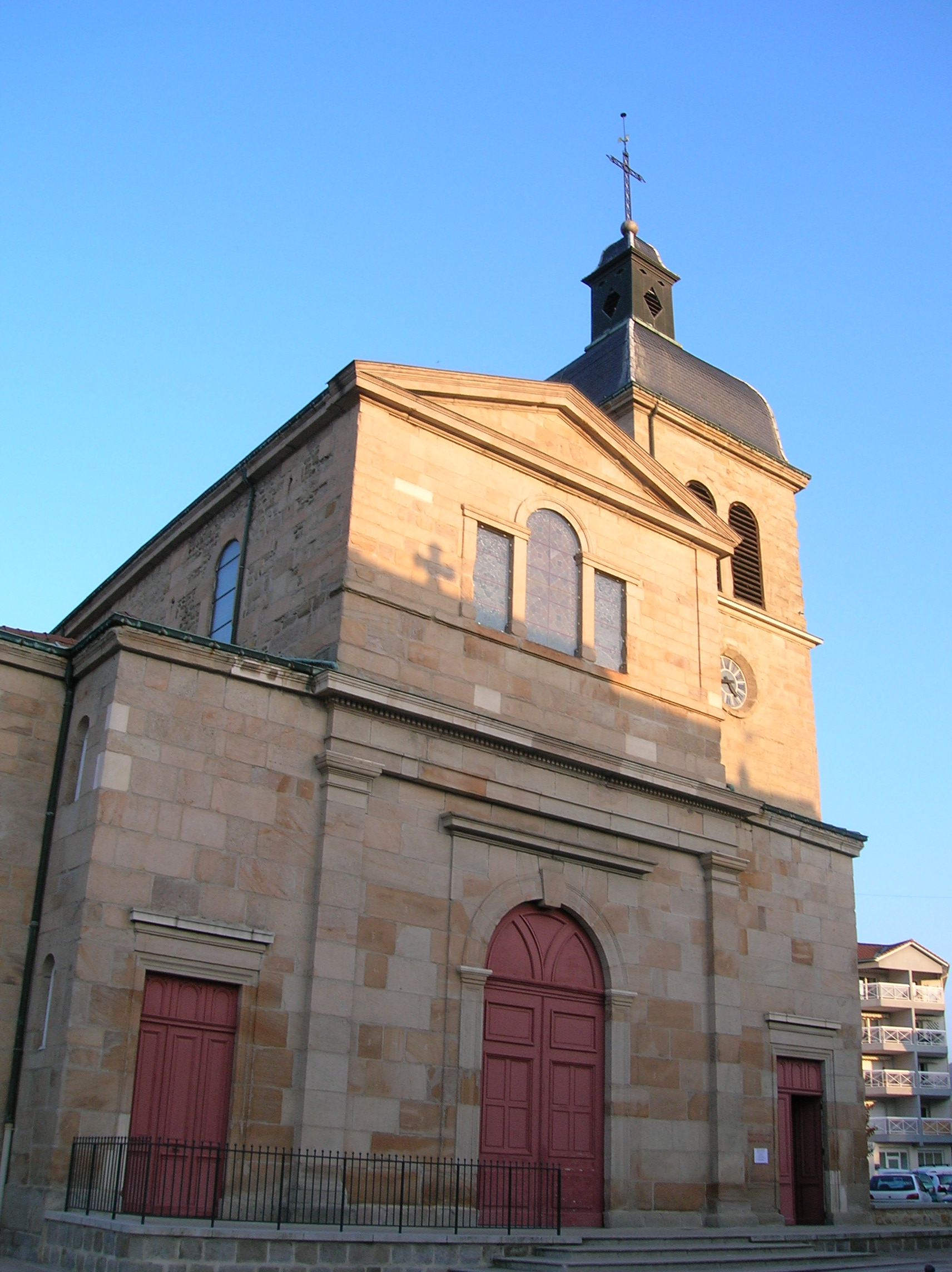
Church of Saint-Clément at Le Chambon-Feugerolles
- Church of Saint-Laurent-d'Agny, dependent on the priory of Saint-Rambert (c. 1225)
- Church of Thurins, dependent on the priory of Saint-Rambert (c. 1225)
- Church of Veauche, dependent on the priory of Saint-Rambert (c. 1225)
- Church of Saint-Héand, dependent on the priory of Saint-Rambert (c. 1225)
- Church of Chevrières, dependent on the priory of Saint-Rambert (c. 1225)

=== Forez ===
- Church of Saint-André de Occiaco (priory of Saint-Rambert) (971), the churches of Saint-Côme (971) and Saint-Damien (1183) as far as Noailleux (971)
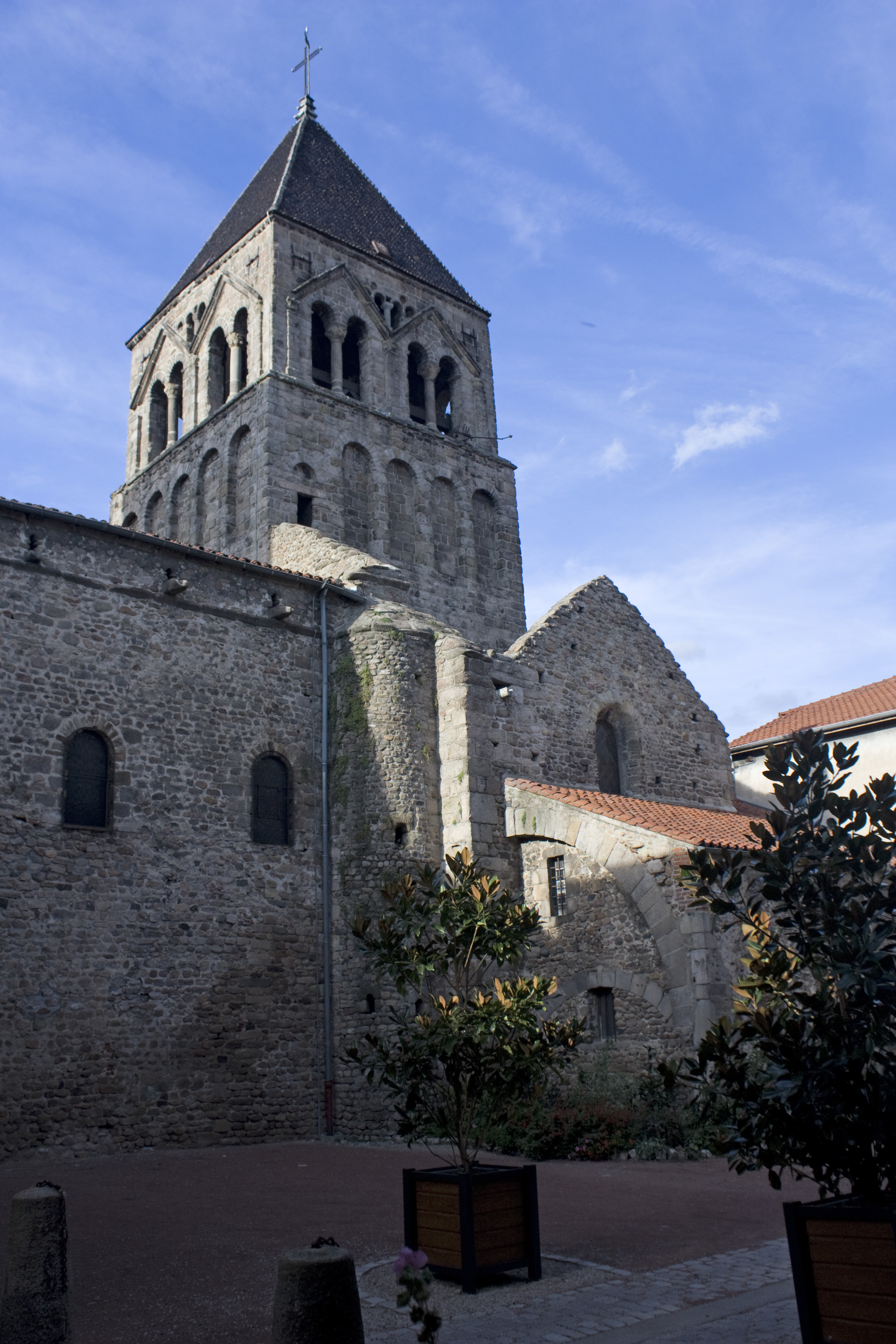
Church of the priory of (Saint-Rambert)
- La Celle-Saint-Martin in Forez and the church of Saint-Bonnet at Cleppé (971)
- Church of Sainte-Marie at Cottance (971)
- Church of Sainte-Marie-Madeleine at the Château de Saint-Germain-Laval (1183)
- Church of Sainte-Foy-Saint-Sulpice (1183)
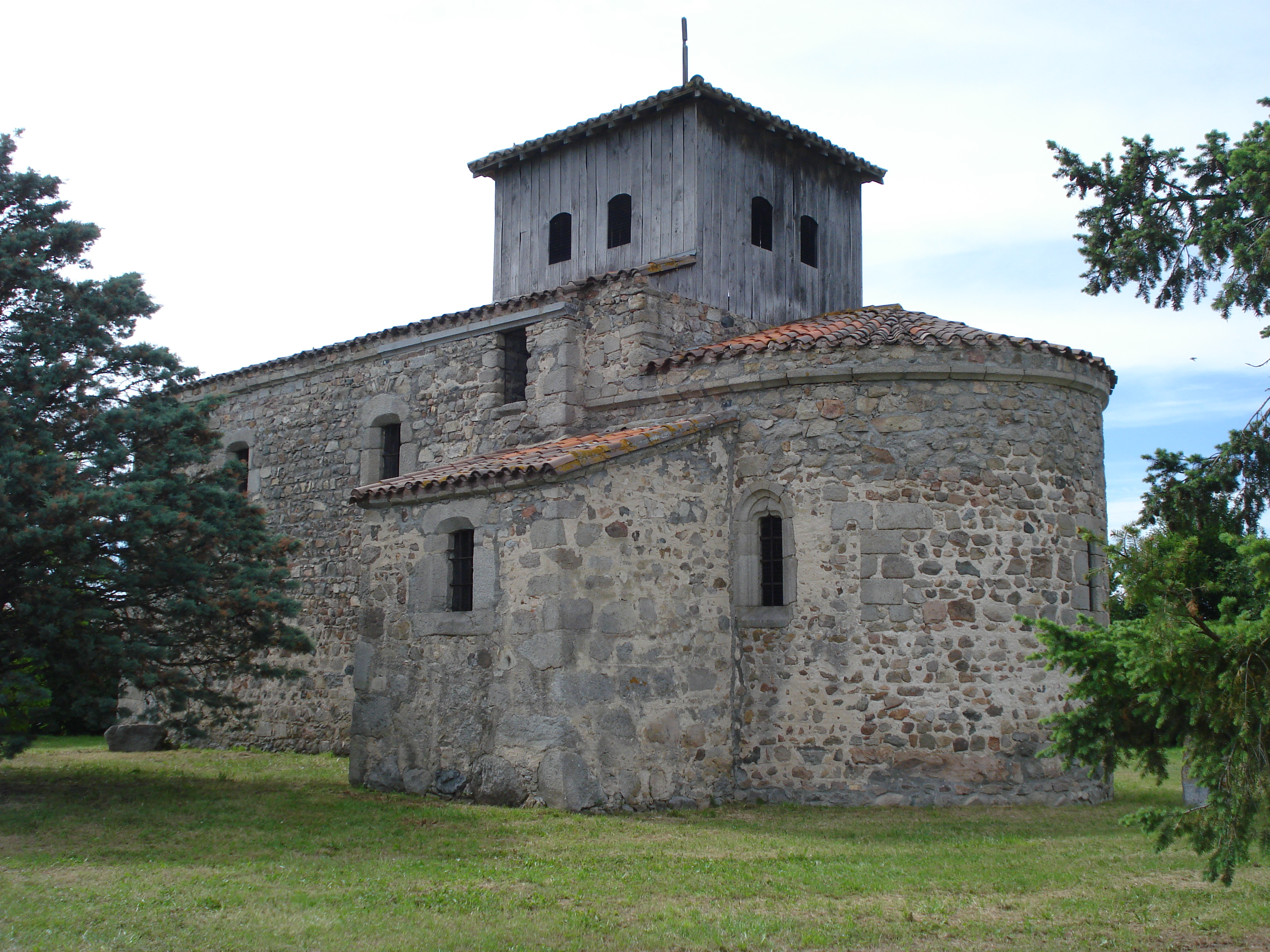
Chapel of Saint-Sulpice at Sainte-Foy-Saint-Sulpice.

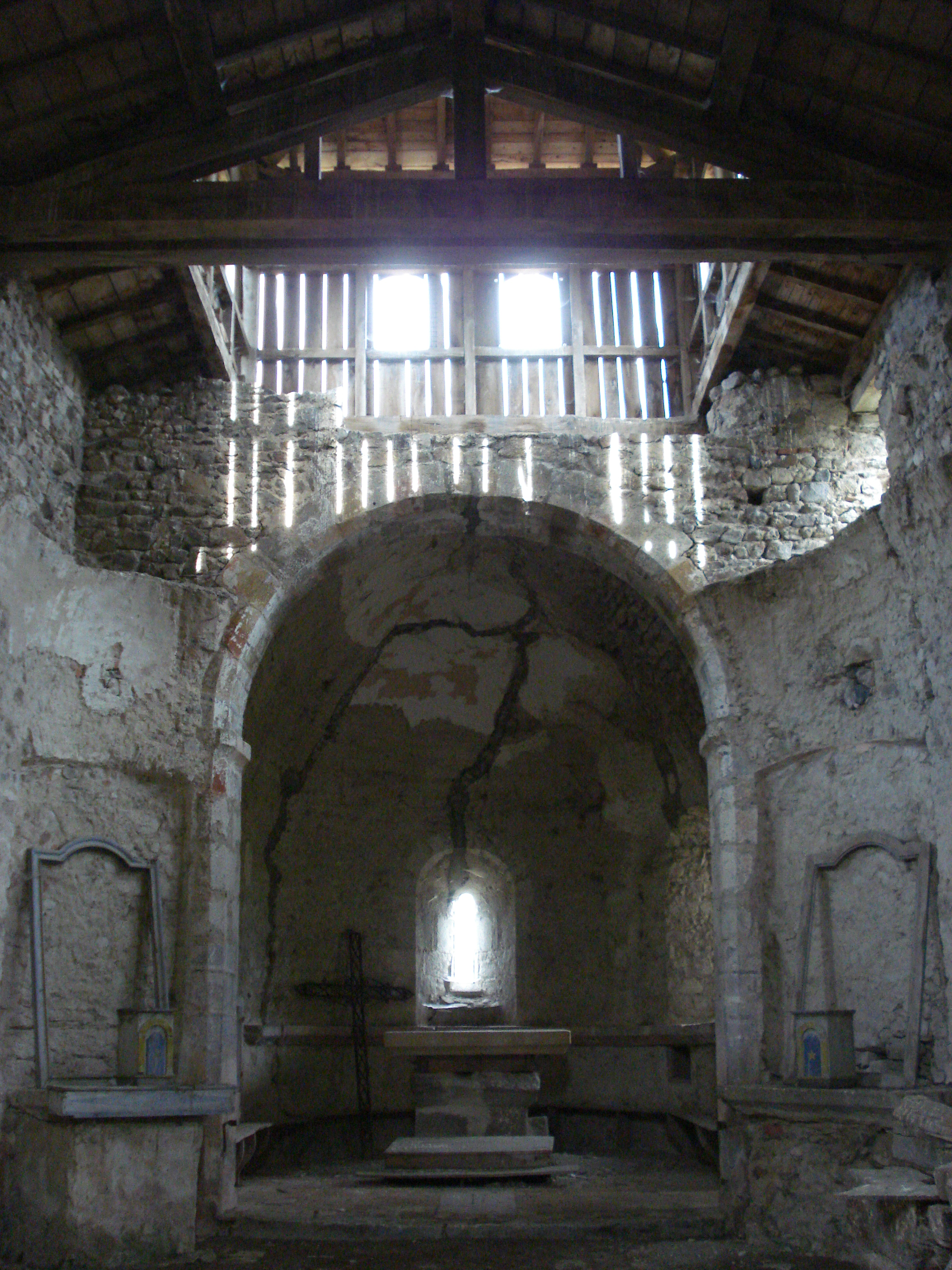
Sainte-Foy-St-Sulpice, dilapidated state of the chapel of Saint-Sulpice
- Church of Magneux-Haute-Rive (1183)
- Church of Marclopt (1183) dependent on the priory of Saint-Rambert (c. 1225)
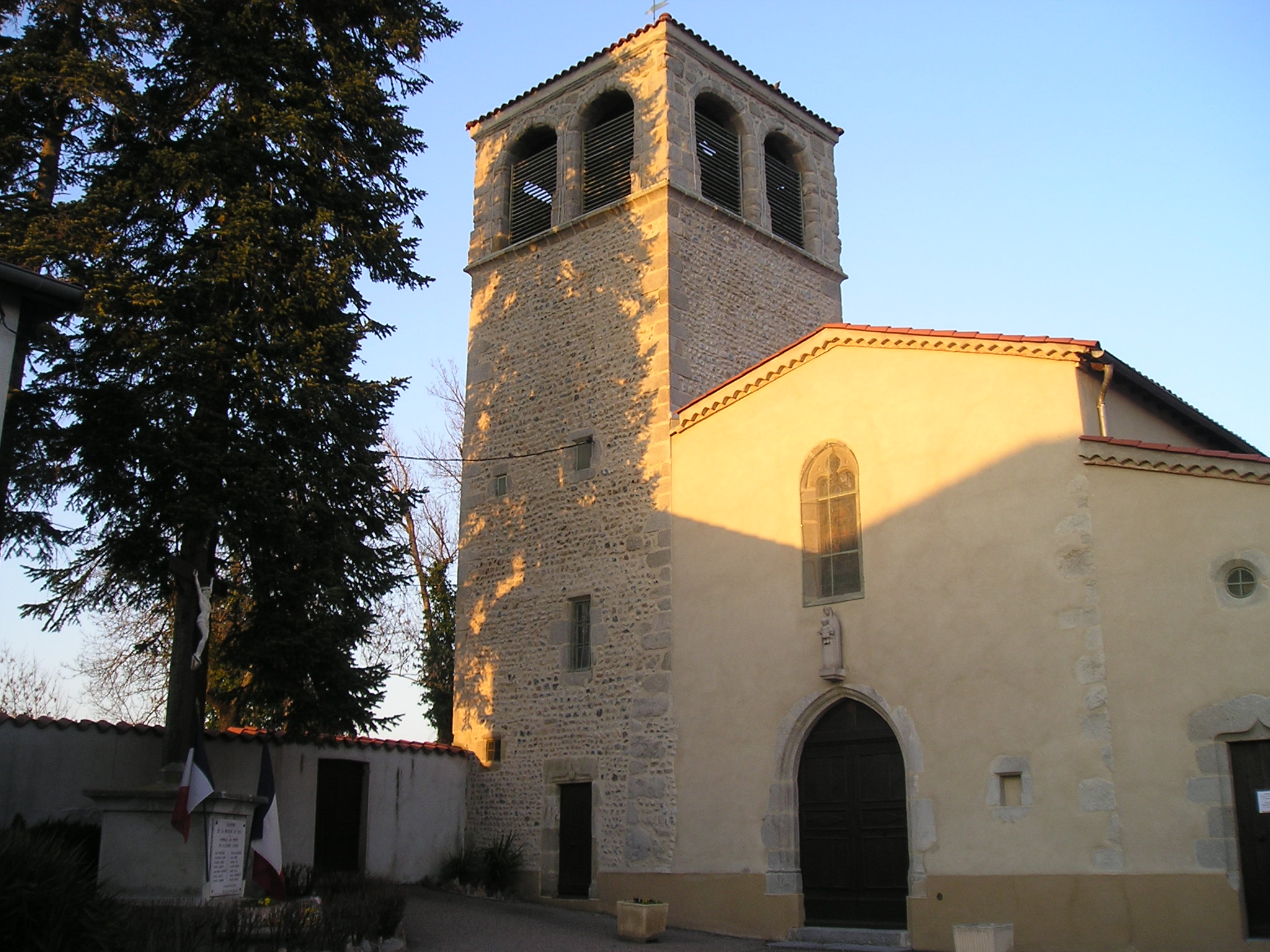
L'église Saint-Martin de Marclopt
- Church of Sainte-Agathe (Sainte-Agathe-la-Bouteresse?) (1183)
- Church of Civens (1183)
- Church of Châtelus (1183) dependent on the priory of Saint-Rambert (c. 1225)
- Church of Sury-le-Comtal (1183)
- Church of Saint-Romain-le-Vieux (Chazelles-sur-Lyon, now the hamlet of "La Tour") (1183)
- Church of Chambles (1183), dependent on the priory of Saint-Rambert (c. 1225)
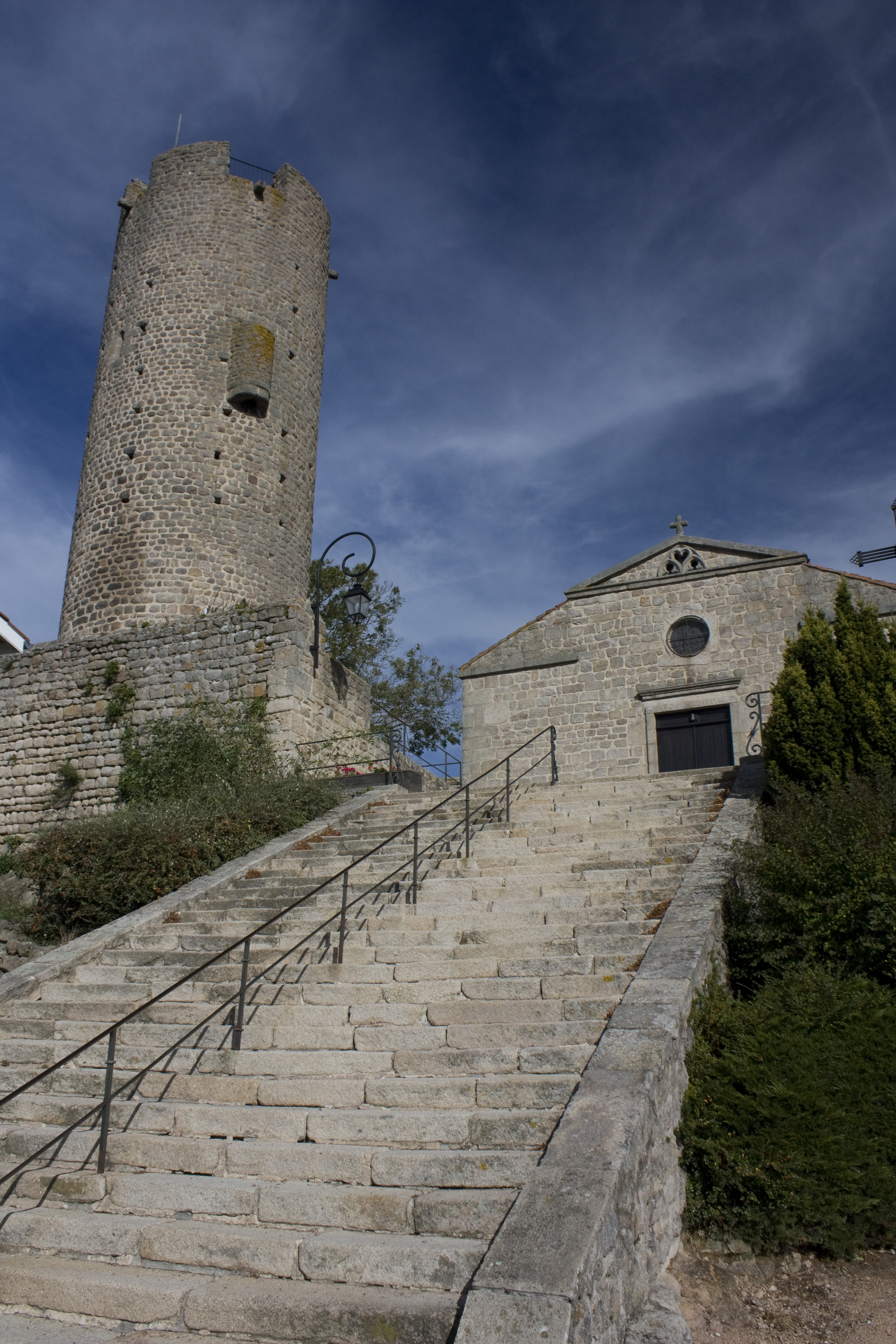
Tower and church of Chambles
- Church of "Benerone" (Bonson) (1183), dependent on the priory of Saint-Rambert (c. 1225)
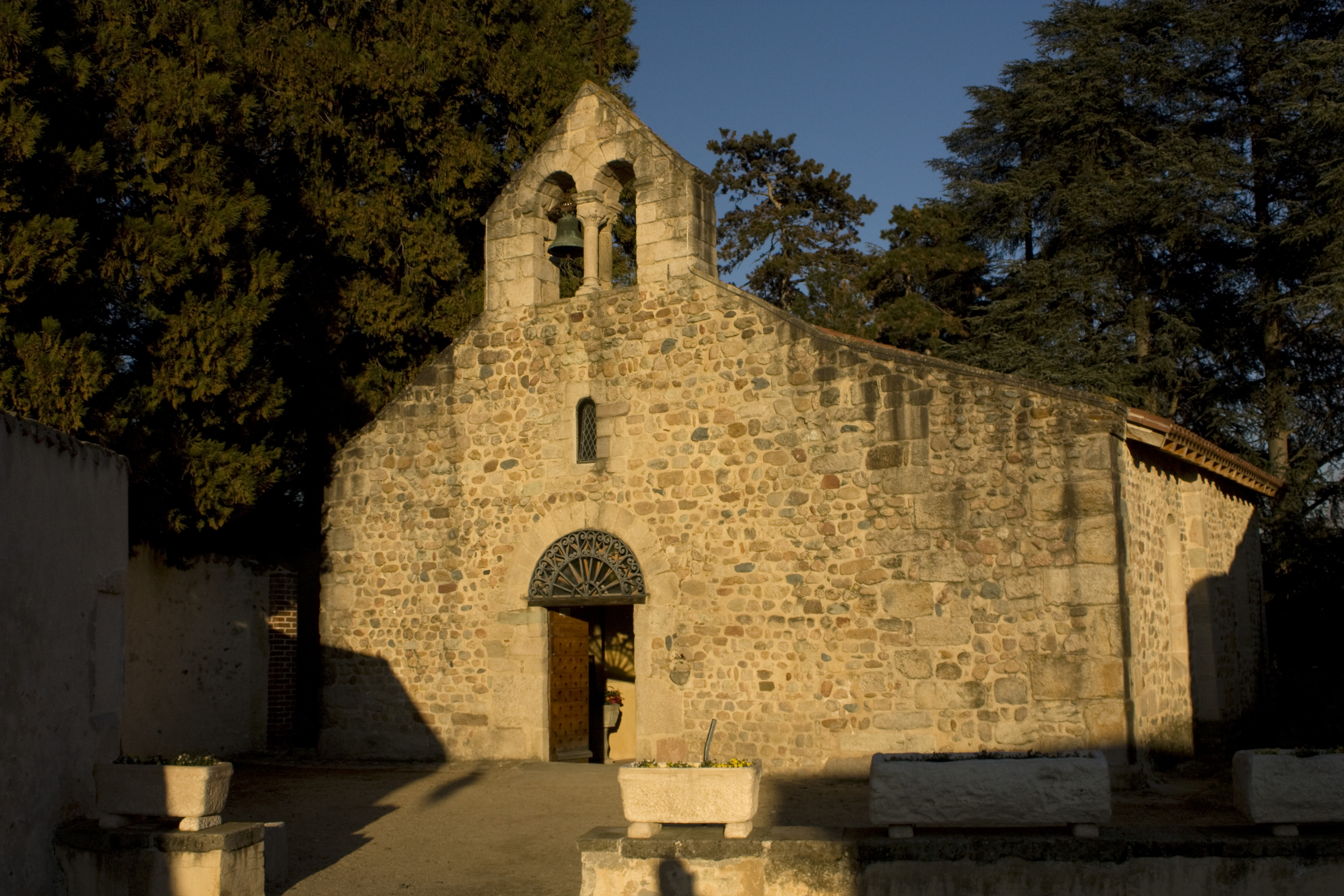
Chapel of Notre-Dame at Bonson
- Church of Saint-Just-sur-Loire (1183)
- Church of Saint-Romain at Jonzieux (1183)
- Church of Saint-Bonnet-le-Château, dependent on the priory of Saint-Rambert (c. 1225)
- Sainte-Croix-en-Jarez (1280)
- Villa of Triols (Luriecq) (1283)
