= Château de Montrond =

Château de Montrond may refer to:

- Château de Montrond (Montrond-les-Bains), a castle in the commune of Montrond-les-Bains in the Loire département of France
- Château de Montrond (Saint-Amand-Montrond), a castle in the commune of Saint-Amand-Montrond in the Cher département of France
