= Château de Grangent =

Coordinates: 45°27′53.5″N 4°15′14″E

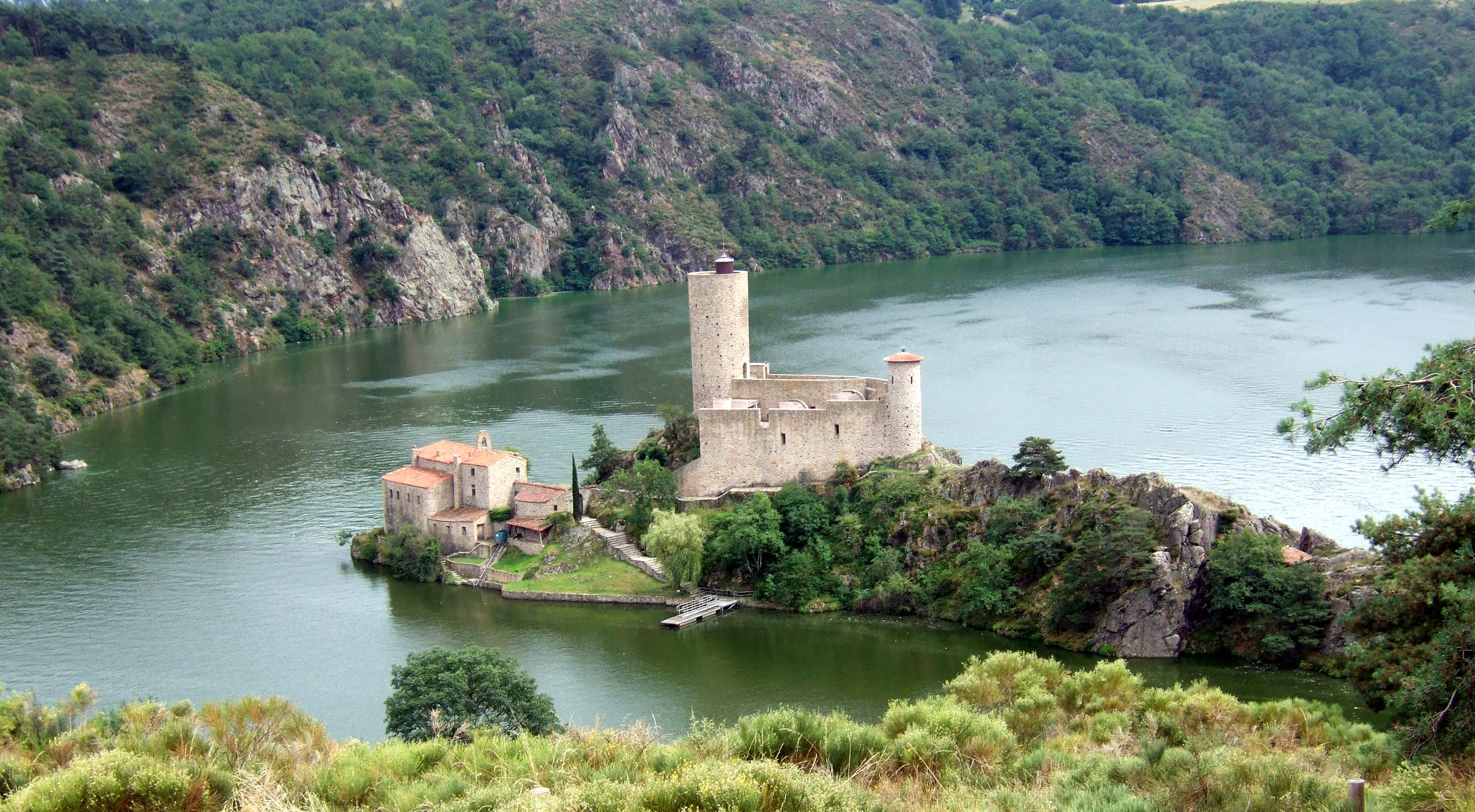
Château de Grangent

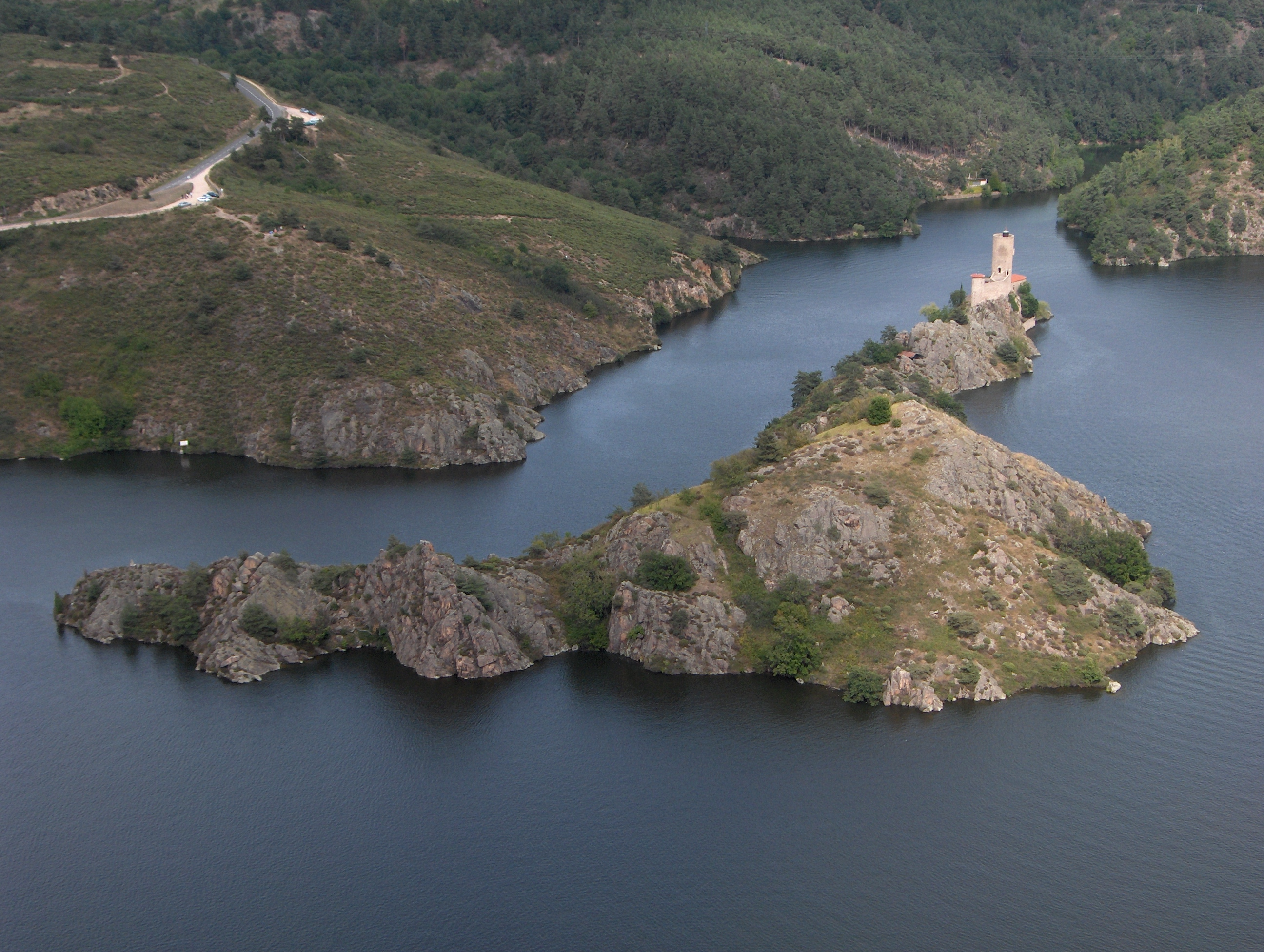
Lac de Grangent and castle

The Château de Grangent is a ruined castle in the commune of Saint-Just-Saint-Rambert in the Loire département of France.

At the time of its construction, originally around 800, it was on a promontory standing some 50 metres above the river Loire. The building of the Grangent dam means that it is now on a small island in a lake, the lac de Grangent. It is overlooked by the larger castle, the Château d'Essalois. During the Middle Ages and later, it suffered destruction, rebuilding and several restorations.

It has been listed since 1945 as a monument historique by the French Ministry of Culture.

The castle is privately owned.

== See also ==
- List of castles in France
