= Château de Montrond (Montrond-les-Bains) =

Ruined castle in Montrond-les-Bains in the Loire département of France

Coordinates: 45°38′38″N 4°13′53″E

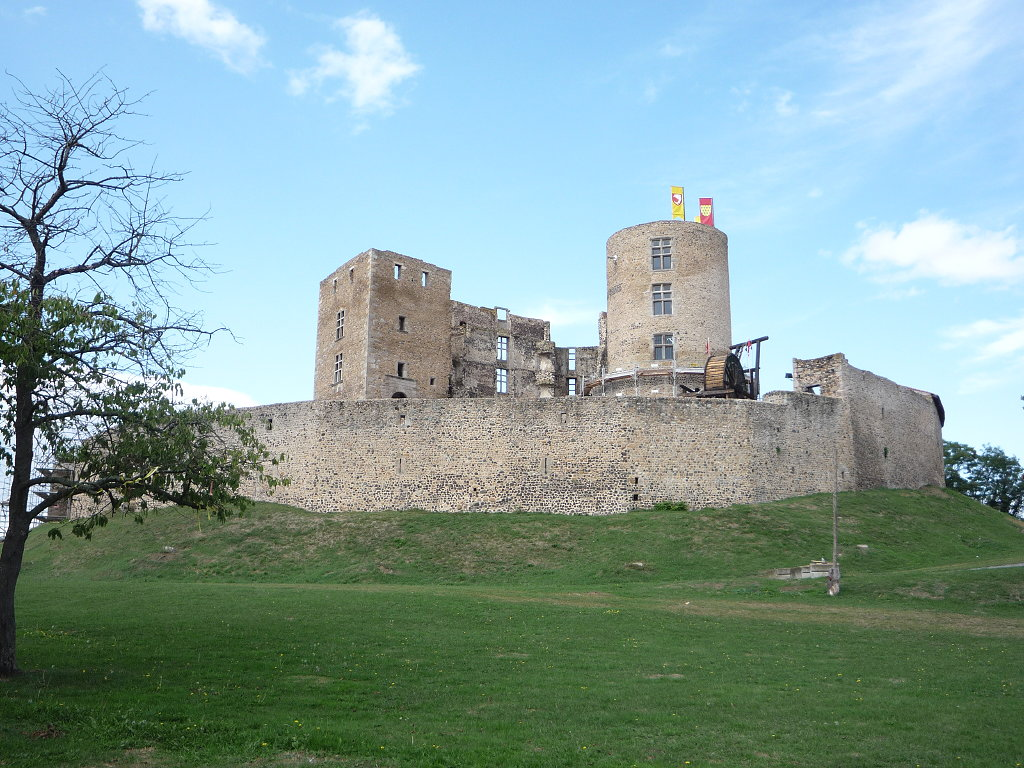

The Château de Montrond is a ruined castle in the commune of Montrond-les-Bains in the Loire département of France.

As with other ruined feudal castles in the département, such as the Château de Rochetaillée in Saint-Étienne and the Château d'Essalois at Chambles, the Château de Montrond-les-Bains has been partly restored. For some years, a mediaeval festival has been organised in August.

== History ==
The castle is named after Mont Rond, a volcanic dyke which dominates the surrounding plain. A 12th century reference in Latin to a castrum montais rondunti indicates the presence of a small fortification, the property of the Counts of Forez.

In 1302, Count Jean I transferred title to Montrond and its tower to Arthaud de Saint-Germain. Around 1325, Arthaud IV undertook the construction of the first castle. In 1523, the marriage of Arthaud IX to Marguerite d’Albon, the daughter of Jean, governor of the children of François I, allowed the seigneurie of Montrond to reach the height of its renown. The austere fortress was transformed into a beautiful and rich home in Renaissance style.

Heavily involved in the Wars of Religion, the descendants of Arthaud IX retained their property thanks to their fidelity to the royal power.

The family left Montrond in 1730 to establish themselves close to Paris. The last marquis, Antoine-Claude, was guillotined there in April 1793. In September of the same year, the Château de Montrond was burned by a detachment of revolutionary soldiers. The Apchon-Montrond family died out in 1807 with the death of a girl without descendants.

The castle was sold to an individual in 1828 who used it as a quarry for stones. Left abandoned for a century and a half, it was saved from certain ruin by the Association des Amis du château (Association of Friends of the Castle) founded in 1969.

The remains of the castle were listed as a monument historique in 1934, and the whole castle and its surroundings in 1946.

== See also ==
- List of castles in France
