= Louis Le Laboureur =

French poet

- Born: 1615; Montmorency, Val-d'Oise, France
- Died: 1679 (aged 63–64); Montmorency, Val-d'Oise, France
- Occupation: Poet
- Relatives: Claude Le Laboureur (paternal uncle); Jean Le Laboureur (brother)

Louis Le Laboureur (1615 – 1679) was a French poet.

== Early life ==
Louis Le Laboureur was born in 1615 in Montmorency, Val-d'Oise, France. His paternal uncle, Claude Le Laboureur, was the provost of the Abbey of Île Barbe on the Île Barbe in Lyon and a book collector. His brother, Jean Le Laboureur, was a historian.

== Career ==
Le Laboureur was a poet. His best-known poems are Charlemagne, La Promenade de Saint-Germain, and Les victoires du Duc d'Anguien. He was also the author of a treatise on the superiority of the French language over Latin.

== Death ==
Le Laboureur died in 1679 in Montmorency, France.
