= Jean Le Laboureur =

French courtier, Roman Catholic clergyman and historian

- Born: 1621; Montmorency, Val-d'Oise, Kingdom of France
- Died: 26 June 1675 (aged 53–54); Montmorency, Val d'Oise, France
- Education: Couvent des Célestins
- Occupations: Courtier, clergyman, historian
- Relatives: Claude Le Laboureur (paternal uncle); Louis Le Laboureur (brother)

Jean Le Laboureur (1621 – June 26, 1675) was a French courtier, Roman Catholic clergyman and historian.

== Early life ==
Jean Le Labourer was born in 1621 in Montmorency, Val-d'Oise, France. His paternal uncle, Claude Le Laboureur, was the provost of the Abbey of Île Barbe on the Île Barbe in Lyon and a book collector. His brother, Louis Le Laboureur, was a poet.

Le Laboureur was educated at the Couvent des Célestins in Paris.

== Career ==
Le Laboureur was a courtier. In 1644, he assisted Ambassadress Renée Crespin du Bec in her trip to Poland, where they took Marie Louise Gonzaga before her marriage to Władysław IV Vasa. A travel book about the trip authored by Le Laboureur was published posthumously, in 1697.

Le Laboureur served as a prior in Juvigné and Mayenne. He later served as chaplain and librarian to King Louis XIV. Additionally, he was the author of many books on French history.

Le Labourer was a Knight of the Order of Saint Michael.

== Death ==
Le Laboureur died on 26 June 1675 in Montmorency, France.

== Bibliography ==
- Tombeau des personnes illustres dont les sépultures sont à l'église des Célestins de Paris (1641).
- Relation du voyage de la Reine de Pologne, et du retour de Madame la Maréchale de Guébriant, ambassadrice extraordinaire (1647).
- Histoire du Comte de Guébriant, Maréchal de France (1656).
- Les Mémoires de Michel de Castelnau, Seigneur de Mauvissiere, contenant les choses remarquables qu'il a vues et négociées en France, en Angleterre, en Écosse sous les rois François II et Charles IX, depuis l'an 1559. jusqu'à l'août 1570 (1659).
- Histoire de Charles VI, roi de France, écrite par les ordres et sur les mémoires et les avis de Guy de Monceaux et de Philippes de Villette, abbés de Saint-Denis, par un auteur contemporain, religieux de leur abbaye [...] traduite sur le manuscrit latin tiré de la bibliothèque de M. le président de Thou [...] illustrée de plusieurs commentaires tirés de tous les originaux de ce règne [...]2, traduction française et commentaire (1663).
- Tableaux généalogiques des seize quartiers de nos rois depuis Saint Louis jusqu'à présent (1683).
- Discours de l'Origine des armoiries (1684).
