= Saint-Just-Saint-Rambert Bridge =

Suspension bridge in the Loire department, France

- Coordinates: 45°31′00″N 4°14′57″E
- Crosses: Loire
- Locale: Saint-Just-Saint-Rambert

Characteristics
- Trough construction: Reinforced concrete
- Pier construction: Steel
- Total length: 270 m
- Width: 20,55 m
- Height: 40 m

History
- Architect: Strates / Berlottier architectes
- Engineering design by: GFC Construction Group and DV Construction
- Construction start: 2006
- Construction end: 2008

Location
- Interactive map of Saint-Just-Saint-Rambert Bridge

The Saint-Just-Saint-Rambert bridge, also known as the "Grand Pont sur la Loire", is a suspension bridge located in the Loire department that spans the Loire at Saint-Just-Saint-Rambert. It facilitates the deviation of the departmental road D 498, which links the A72 autoroute to the west of the town of Bonson.

As of 26 February 2021 the bridge has been given the name "Pont Pascal Clément," in honor of Pascal Clément, who played a key role in its construction during his tenure as president of the Departmental Council of Loire.

The bridge's design is notable for its unique triangular portal that supports the carrying cables. The two sets of suspender cables thus form inclined planes instead of being parallel. Moreover, it has the particularity of being self-anchored. The anchoring structures are indeed connected to the deck, which results in a portion of the traction forces being transformed into compression in the deck. As a result, the size of these structures is significantly reduced.

== History ==
=== TD 498 deviation ===
The TD 498 deviation is a development project managed by the Departmental Council of Loire that aims to connect the airport interchange on the A72 autoroute to the existing RD 498 between Bonson and Saint-Marcellin-en-Forez. The RD 498 is a relevant route connecting the motorway, Puy-de-Dôme, and Haute-Loire.

This new road improves the residents’ living environment and reduces travel times by 20 to 30 minutes on the considered route with 2 × 2 lanes.

The new road has seen a diversion of vehicles ranging from 15,000 to 22,000 per day. This represents a significant portion of the 30,000 that cross the Loire daily at Saint-Just-Saint-Rambert and Andrézieux-Bouthéon.

The Eastern section, connecting the A72 to RD 12 in Saint-Just-sur-Loire, was opened in July 2005.

The central section connecting the RD 12 to the RD 8 (Bonson) includes the Loire crossing and is 2.7 km long. It has been open to traffic since 15 December 2008.

Location map

The western section, 2.6 km long, completes the project between the RD 8 interchange and the end interchange on the RD 498. Construction was completed in early 2011.

=== 2004–2006: Studies ===
The studies for the structure were conducted from 2003 to 2006 by a project team consisting of a technical engineering firm, QUADRIC; an architectural firm, STRATES; and a team of agents from the Delegation to Infrastructure of the Loire Department.

The founding principles of the project were gradually developed by the project team:

- Respect the natural river by crossing it along with its riparian forests without intermediate support in a single span, thus preserving the biotope;
- Dare to create an emblematic structure marking the crossing of the river;
- Innovate by adopting self-anchoring to save materials and financial resources.

After preliminary studies, the departmental assembly opted for a participatory approach for the final choice of the structure's architecture. Two proposals were put to the Internet users: a classic bridge with parallel cables supported by two trapezoidal-shaped frames, and an innovative bridge with cables converging at the top of two triangular frames. 84% of Internet users voted for the triangular bridge. This is the architecture chosen by the Departmental Assembly.

=== 2006–2008: Construction of the structure ===
The first earthworks began in January 2006. The bases of the four legs of the pylons were completed during the summer of 2006. The rest of their construction continued in the second half of 2006, and they were ready to receive the suspension equipment in April 2007.

From mid-August to mid-October 2006, the first 150 meters of the steel deck frame were assembled on site. The second half of the steel structure was then transported and assembled. By mid-December, the entire structure had been assembled.

On 18 December 2006 the deck was pushed approximately 40 meters to the left bank. The last two pushes, of 50 meters and then 30 meters, took place on 11 and 12 January 2007.

Assembly and tensioning took place during the summer of 2007. Waterproofing and the first layer of asphalt were completed in September – October 2007. Approximately 100 to 150 meters of embankments and roadways on each side of the bridge and the installation of equipment were completed by the end of 2007.

The bridge was inaugurated on 13 December 2008 and put into service on the 15th.

== Participants ==
Role		Participant
Project owner		Departmental Council of Loire
Main contractor		Infrastructure Delegation CG 42
Architect		Strates
Technical design		Quadric
Companies	Civil engineering	Groupement GFC Construction and DV Construction
Companies	Framing and suspension	Baudin-Chateauneuf
Construction studies	Civil engineering	SECOA
Construction studies	Metal	Baudin-Chateauneuf
Controls	Construction studies	Quadric
Controls	External framework	SNCF Engineering Department

== Description ==
=== Functional Characteristics ===
The structure supports a 2x2 lane road. It has a usable width of 20.55 meters and includes a 3.0 meter wide fast lane and a 3.50 wide slow lane on each side of a central median.

Saint-Just-Saint-Rambert bridge elevation.

=== Abutments and Self-Anchorage ===
In suspended bridges, all forces are transmitted through the suspension cables, which in turn are anchored to anchor masses on both sides of the structure. These must be absolutely stable in both horizontal sliding and tipping. This leads to the construction of abutments and anchoring masses with very large volumes.

In the Saint-Just-Saint-Rambert bridge, an original solution was chosen: the abutments and the deck are rigidly connected, the whole resting on foundation masses. Each cable thus transfers the horizontal component of the forces to the deck in compression, reducing the volume of the necessary anchoring mass, which now only supports the vertical component.

The suspension cables are anchored in reinforced concrete abutments of 7,000 tons due to a reinforced concrete lattice structure. The embedding of the deck is ensured by a transition zone prestressed transversely by eleven 19T15 cables.

The abutments are supported by 4 x 2 supports of 800 x 700 x 8 (16 + 5) on beams supporting 1,500 diameter piles.

=== The deck ===
==== Description ====
The deck is a twin-girder structure of mixed framing consisting of bridge sections and brackets. It has three continuous spans (35 m – 200 m – 35 m).

The main bridge sections, numbering 25 and spaced every 7.692 m, have a constant height between the girders, and have brackets of varying heights. The brackets have a metal tube at the end to receive the suspender. The secondary bridge sections, 1 m high at the axis, have variable heights and are placed between the main bridge sections and on the spans.

The 0.27 m voided slab was cast on 0.12 m thick composite concrete slabs.

==== Manufacturing ====
The beams were manufactured in nine sections each at the Châteauneuf-sur-Loire plant and then transported by a oversize load to the assembly platform located on the left bank of the Loire.

Manufacturing was carried out conventionally using a machine for welded reconstituted profiled sections (PRS). The main difficulty lay in the manufacture of the main brackets, which were all different and had very tight geometric tolerances on the suspension tube. Their manufacture required the development of a pre-assembly bench to accurately align the tube to the console web and control the geometry.

==== Installation ====
The structure crosses the river at a relatively low level, and the Loire divides at this point into a minor bed and a secondary branch separated by an island. This configuration allowed for the consideration, from the outset, of an original assembly method for this type of structure: the metal framework of the deck was launched on five temporary struts, three in the Loire bed and two on the pylons. In addition, a 20 m cantilever was used to relieve the overhang.

Once the composite slabs were in place, the deck was cast and the suspension was installed from the deck. The suspenders’ tensioning at the end of the assembly straightened the deck and allowed the struts to be removed.

=== Pylons ===
Bridge cross-section

The inverted V-shaped pylons are made of B60 concrete. The legs have a rectangular section inclined at 20.5°. This section varies from 2.20 x 1.80 at the top to 2.20 x 3.00 at the deck level. The lower part has an additional wall on the inside, on which the deck rests. Each leg is embedded in a base plate connected to its neighbor by a reinforced concrete anchor. Due to the asymmetry of the site, the pylon on the left bank measures 38 m, while that on the right bank measures 41 m. Similarly, the left bank bases each rest on eight Ø 1,500 piles, while those on the right bank are flat and constructed inside a cofferdam.

=== Suspension ===
==== Description ====
The two suspension cables, approximately 305 m long, consist of 19 strands of 77.8 mm diameter assembled in a hexagonal configuration. They pass over a fixed saddle, inclined at 20.5 degrees, before branching out into a fan shape for anchorage in the ears.

The hangers, 25 per side, are single-strand cables with a diameter of 88.6 mm sheathed in HDPE. They range in length from 23 m near the pylons to 3 m at mid-span. The upper attachments are made of cast steel. The lower attachment is by means of a bolted base housed in a tube welded to the end of the brackets.

==== Manufacturing ====
The multilayer cables (TMC) constituting the bundles of the main cables and the hangers were manufactured according to the process developed by Ferdinand Arnodin.

Galvanized wires were first wound onto coils, arranged onto cable reels. Each layer of wires has six more wires than the previous one and is wound in the opposite direction on the cable. Therefore, the coils are placed in multiples of six on coupled reels that rotate in opposite directions.

In the first pass, the first four layers of wires can be wrapped around the cable core, namely 6, 12, 18, and then 24 wires, for a total of 61 wires with the core. To achieve the desired diameter, the cable passes back through the coiling machine where additional reels are coupled to create layers of 30 and then 36 wires. The anticorrosion protection of the TMC was done differently on the main cables and on the hangers. For the main cables, in addition to galvanizing the wires, a bitumen-based paint protection was applied to the assembled cable. For the hangers, the galvanized wires were coated with petroleum wax during cable manufacture to fill the voids, and then the cable was sheathed with extruded HDPE under vacuum.

==== Installation ====
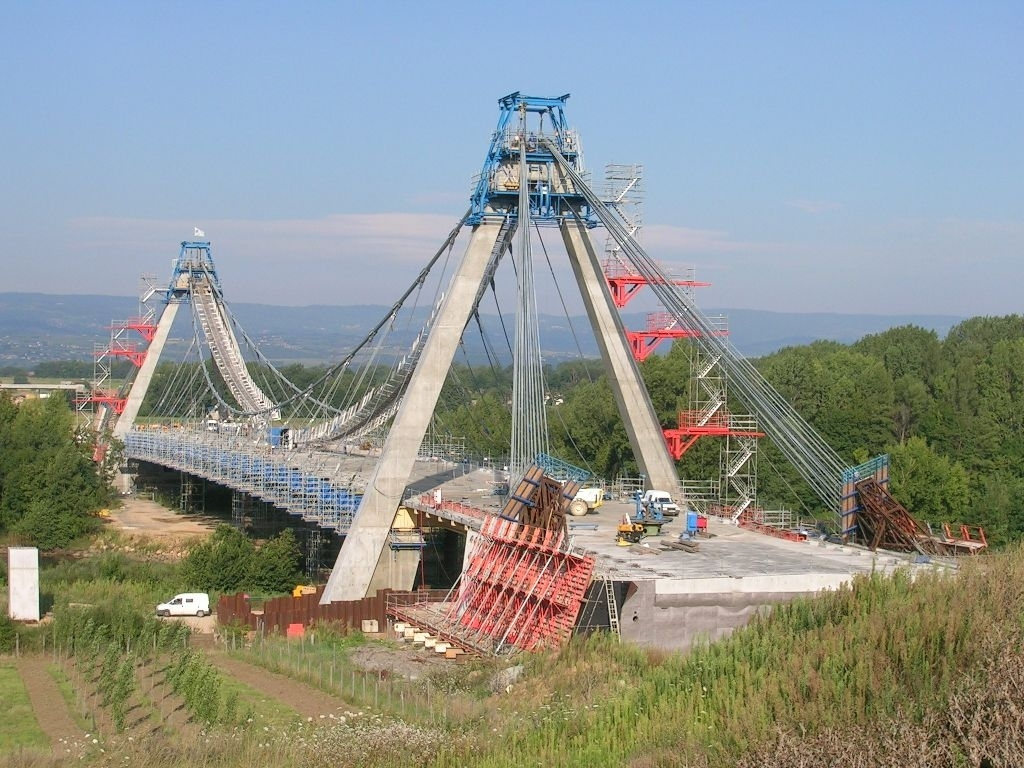
Suspension in place – August 2007

The installation of the main cables and deviation saddles required the installation of working platforms at the head of the pylon and a cable walkway. The strands were installed using winches and carts supporting the anchoring sockets. The cables slid through a PEHD chute. Installation was mainly done at night to ensure that various expansions did not interfere with the geometric adjustment of the cable network.

The two cable networks were installed vertically before being inclined in phases during the load transfer.

The hangers were positioned by crane from the deck. Each hanger foot was equipped with a basket for access and a jacking equipment for tensioning and load transfer. During this operation, the suspension cables were lengthened and the deck was shortened. This caused a movement of the saddles towards the central span. These were positioned accordingly at the time of cable laying and therefore had to be moved by jacks with a Teflon / inox sliding device.

After the load transfer, the complex sealing/wearing course and superstructures were installed. This additional load required a further displacement of the saddles, which were immobilized after adjustment, and then the suspension was definitively adjusted.

== See also ==
- Saint-Just-Saint-Rambert
- Loire (department) – Loire – Loire Valley
- Suspension bridge – List of longest suspension bridge spans

== Bibliography ==
- Vannier, Serge (April 2005). Les ponts de la Loire – De sa source à l’Atlantique (in French). CPE.
