= Château d'Essalois =

French castle

Coordinates: 45°27′44″N 4°14′45″E

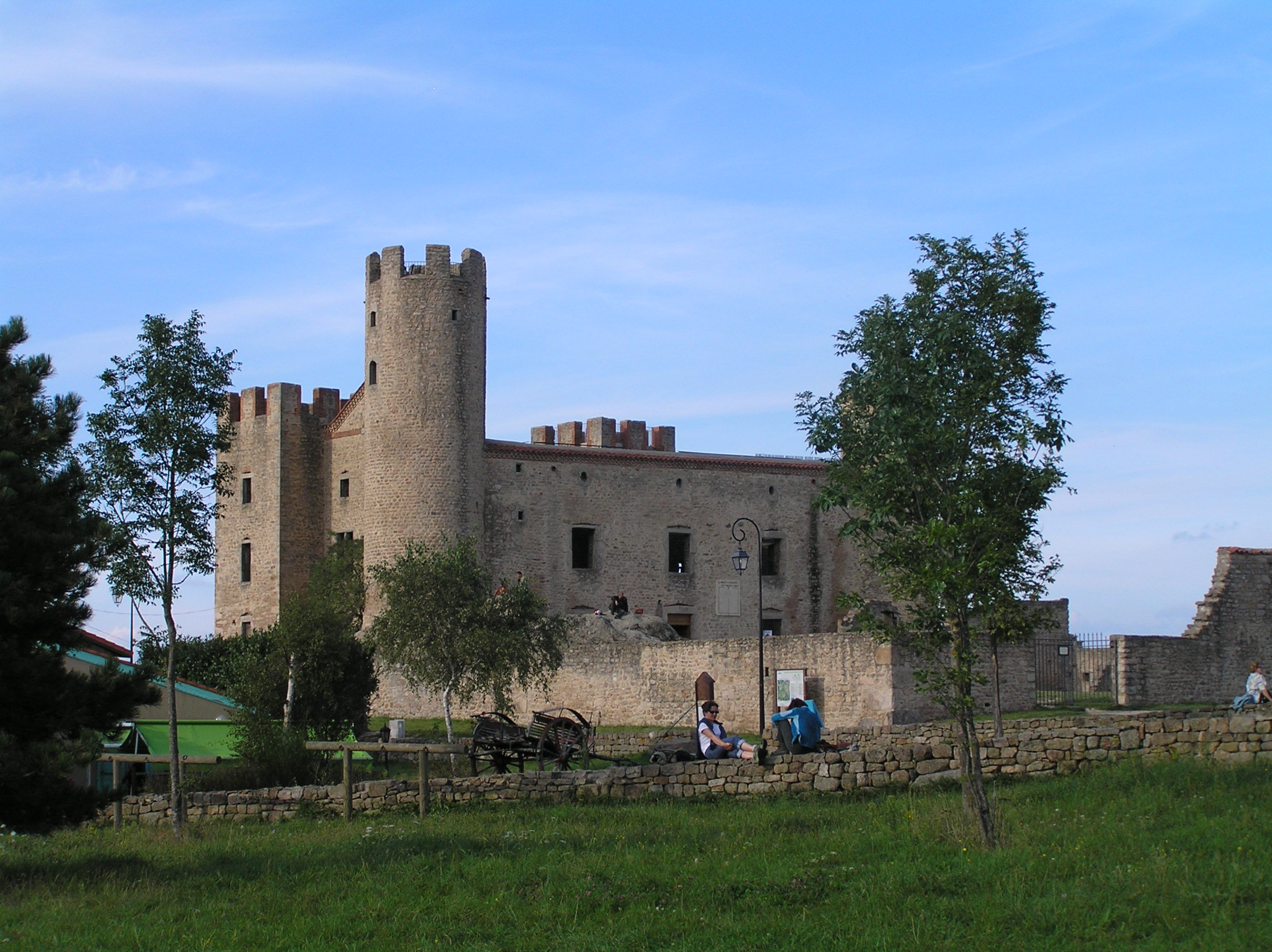
Front of the Château.

The Château d'Essalois is a restored castle in the commune of Chambles in the Loire département of France, overlooking a dammed portion of the river Loire, Lake Grangent.

== History ==
=== Site of ancient occupation ===
The castle stands on a natural strategic strong point, inhabited by mankind since time immemorial. The very important Gallic oppidum (occupied by the Segusiavi from 170BC to 25BC) extended for 500m behind the castle in a place known as "le palais" (the palace). The remains of the oppidum walls are buried by broom. Finds of amphoras and coins during the archaeological excavations carried out by Preynat revealed the existence of an important wine trade with Italy, before the Roman occupation.

=== Unknown origin ===
The oldest documents mentioning the castle are from the 14th century. The puy (hill) of Essalois is quoted in charters from 1337 onwards, variously named Podium deysaluym, Mons deysaluym and Suc du Pré.

In 1378, Arthaud de Villedieu paid homage to the Count of Forez for the house and the tower of Essalois which oversaw the Loire.

In 1464, the tower of Essalois belonged to Beraud de la Bâtie.

So far, the vestiges of this early construction have not been identified.

=== 16th century construction ===
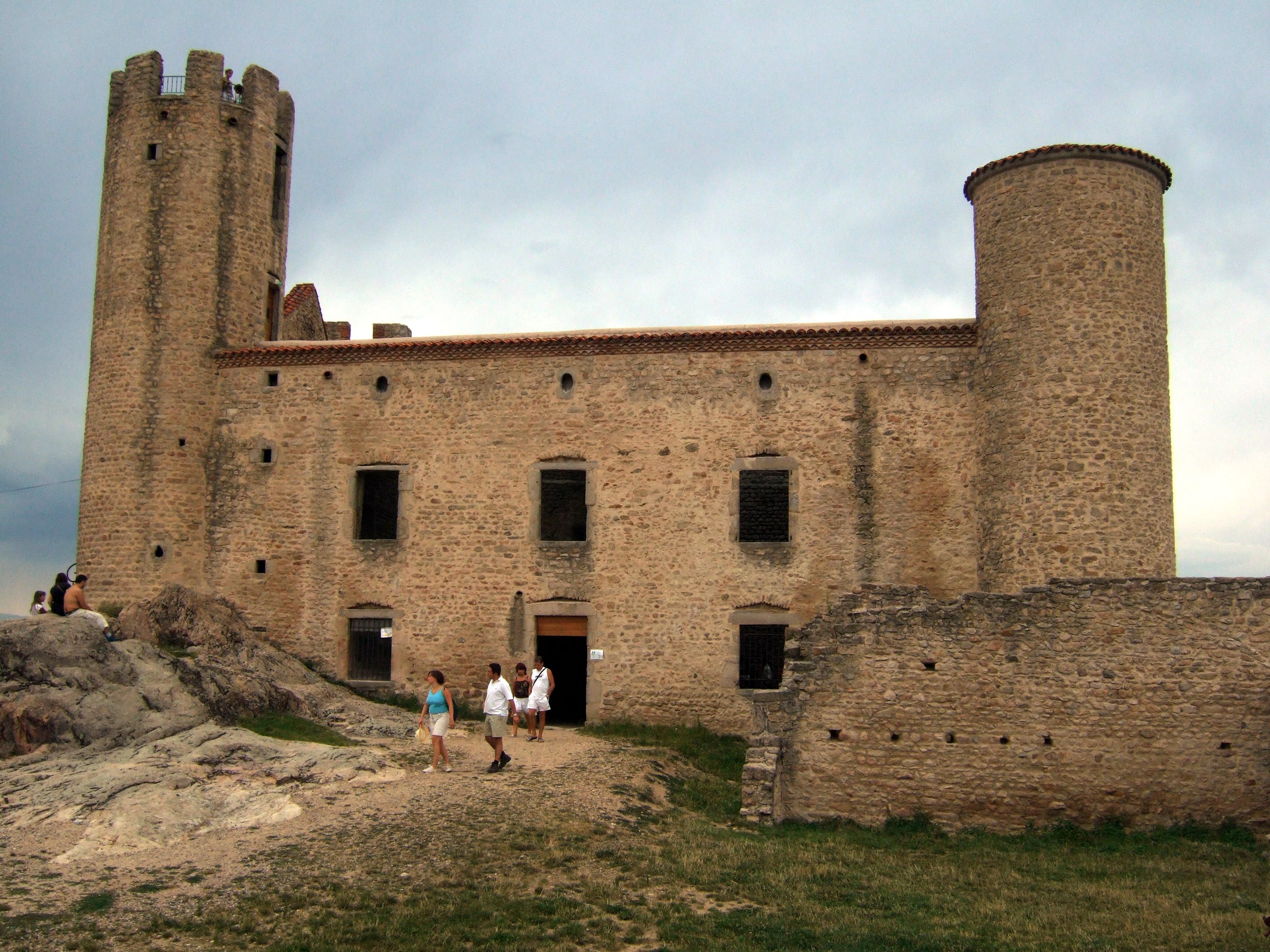

The castle as it currently appears was built mainly in 1580 by Léonard de Bertrand, Seigneur of Essalois and master of water and forests in Montbrison. In 1590, the castle was plundered by Catholic League troops commanded by Honore d'Urfé.

The seigniory which included Chambles, Périgneux, Saint-Marcellin and Saint-Rambert passed in the 17th century to the lords of Sury-le-Comtal, the De la Veuhes, and through them to the Sourdis family.

In 1671, Catherine d' Entraigues, widow of Pierre Sourdis, sold the seigniory to the Camaldolese monks at Val Jésus. The Camaldoleses kept the castle until 1798.

In the 18th century, the estate was sold as national property to Pierre Théollière of Réardière, and it then passed successively to several owners. It comprised then the old castle, consisting of two towers, a barn, farm buildings and stables, surrounded by wood, forests, meadows, rocks and heather, with approximately 718 smallholdings. This inventory of 1791 and studying the plans of the deed makes it possible to distinguish in the buildings at least two parts, of which the oldest is obviously the southern half comprising the two round towers.

=== 19th century: first restoration ===
The castle was in ruins when it was bought towards the end of the 19th century by Hippolyte Sauzéa, a merchant in Saint-Étienne who restored it and bequeathed it to the Hospices of Saint-Étienne. The east and west facades carry obvious signs (vertical joints, replaced masonry) which make it possible to distinguish the two restoration campaigns. The brick works carries the hallmarks of the 19th century. On the western facade is the coat of arms of Hippolyte Sauzéa.

=== Current restoration ===
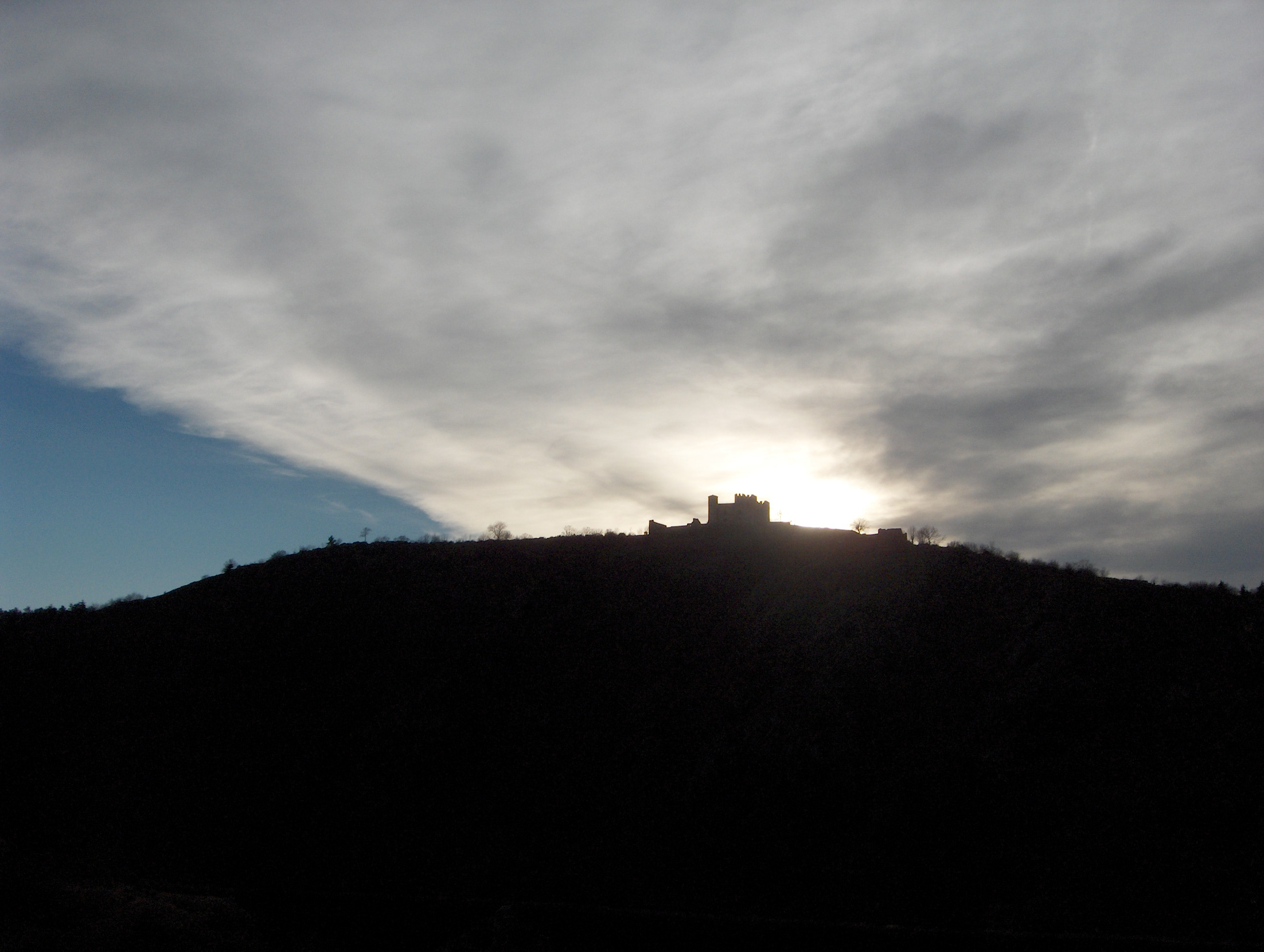
The Château's hilltop location.

In 1976, the Syndicat Mixte d’Aménagement des gorges de la Loire (seven communes bordering the Grangent Lake) and the département of the Loire acquired the Château d'Essalois. From 1983, restoration continued under the direction of Gilles Michelou, with the assistance of Mr. Lazar, architect of Bâtiments de France.

The castle, by its size and its position, occupies one of the strong points of the Gorges of the Loire. Its tower offers a view of the landscape, including the Grangent lake and the Château de Grangent below.

== See also ==
- List of castles in France
- Château de Grangent

== Sources ==
- Information panel on the site, citing :
- Jean-Paul Preynat, Un haut lieu Celtique en Forez : l'oppidum d'Essalois, 1992 ISBN 2-9506576-0-5.
- Emile Salmon, Château en Forez, vol 1, 1916.
- Albert Boissier, Chambles, la région illustrée, 1934.
