= Claude Le Laboureur =

French Roman Catholic clergyman and historian

- Born: 1601
- Died: 1680s
- Occupation(s): Clergyman, historian, genealogist
- Relatives: Jean Le Laboureur (nephew); Louis Le Laboureur (nephew)

Claude Le Laboureur (1601–1680s) was a French Roman Catholic clergyman and historian.

== Early life ==
Claude Le Laboureur was born in 1601.

== Career ==
Le Laboureur was the provost of the Abbey of Île Barbe on the Île Barbe in Lyon.

Le Laboureur was the author of books about French history, genealogy, and heraldry. He was also a large book collector.

== Death and legacy ==
Le Laboureur died in the 1675. One of his nephews, Jean Le Laboureur, became a courtier and historian, while another nephew, Louis Le Laboureur, was a poet. Meanwhile, Le Laboureur bequeathed many of his books to local libraries.
