= Sainte-Foy-Saint-Sulpice =

- Commune
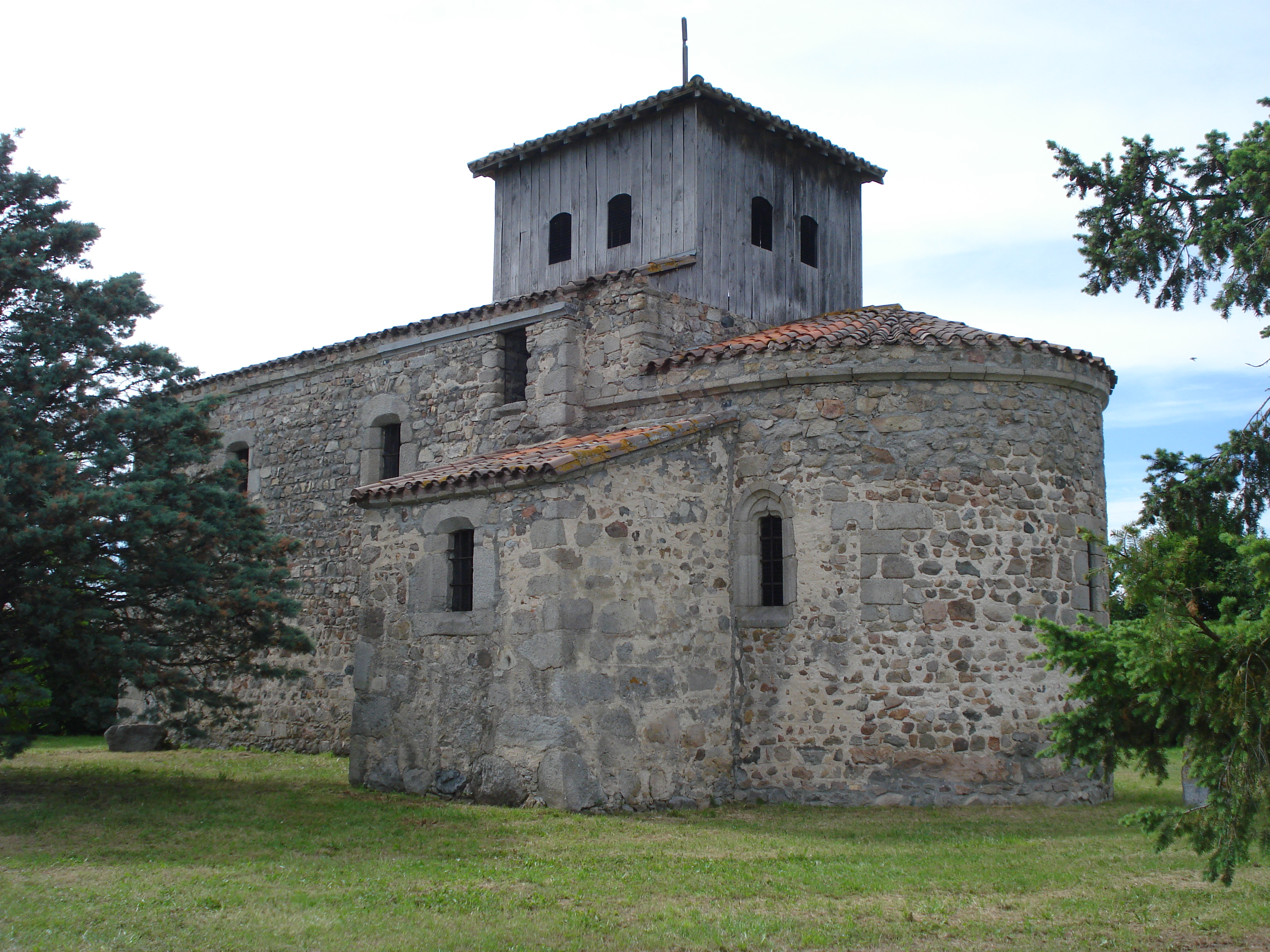
- Location of Sainte-Foy-Saint-Sulpice
- Location within France Location within Auvergne-Rhône-Alpes
- Coordinates: 45°46′11″N 4°07′48″E
- Country: France
- Region: Auvergne-Rhône-Alpes
- Department: Loire
- Arrondissement: Montbrison
- Canton: Boën-sur-Lignon
- Intercommunality: CA Loire Forez

Government
  - Mayor (2020–2026): Mickaël Miomandre
- Area^{1}: 29.12 km^{2} (11.24 sq mi)
- Elevation: 390 m (1,280 ft)
- Highest elevation: 401 m (1,316 ft)
- Lowest elevation: 327 m (1,073 ft)
- Population (2023): 568
  - Density: 19.5/km^{2} (50.5/sq mi)
- Time zone: UTC+01:00 (CET)
  - Summer (DST): UTC+02:00 (CEST)
- INSEE/Postal code: 42221 /42110
- ^{1} French Land Register data, which excludes lakes, ponds, glaciers > 1 km^{2} (0.386 sq mi or 247 acres) and river estuaries.

Sainte-Foy-Saint-Sulpice (French pronunciation: [sɛ̃t fwa sɛ̃ sylpis]) is a commune in the Loire department in central France.

== Population ==
Historical population
Year	Pop.	±% p.a.
1968	363	—
1975	331	−1.31%
1982	322	−0.39%
1990	343	+0.79%
1999	354	+0.35%
2007	402	+1.60%
2012	524	+5.44%
2017	512	−0.46%
2023	568	+1.74%
Source: INSEE

== See also ==
- Communes of the Loire department
