= Château de Rochetaillée =

Ruined feudal castle in Loire, France

Coordinates: 45.4101°N 4.4461°E

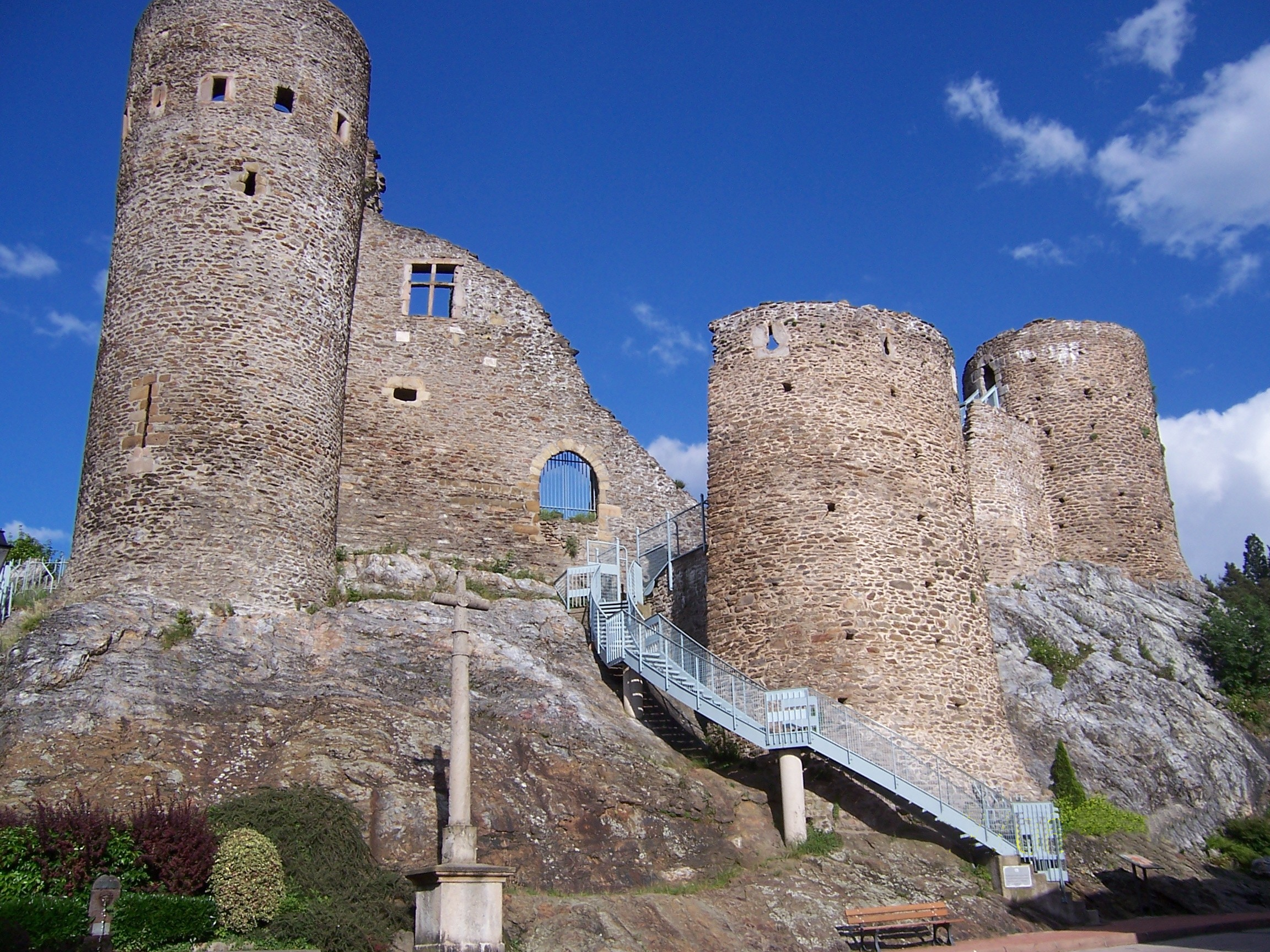
Ruins of Chateau de Rochetaillée

The Château de Rochetaillée is a ruined feudal castle in the city of Saint-Étienne in the Loire département of France.

== History ==
The castle's construction dates from the 12th century, with additional work in the 16th century.

It has been listed since 1930 as a monument historique by the French Ministry of Culture.

== See also ==
- List of castles in France
