= Lac de Grangent =

Lake in France

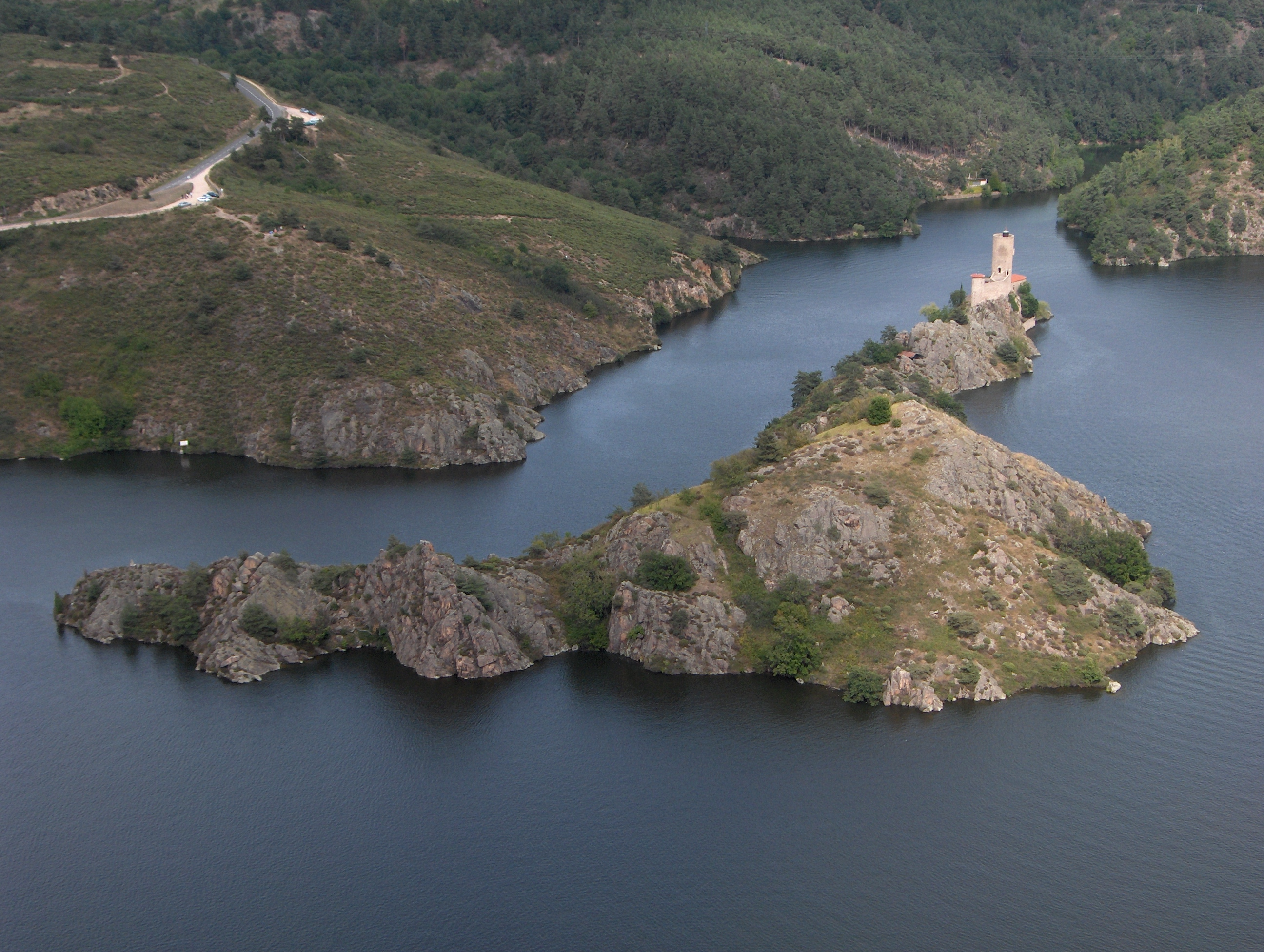

- Location within Auvergne-Rhône-Alpes
- Location: Loire
- Coordinates: 45°27′N 4°15′E
- Type: artificial
- Primary inflows: Loire
- Basin countries: France
- Surface area: 3.65 km^{2} (1.41 sq mi)
- Water volume: 66,000,000 m^{3} (2.3×10^{9} cu ft)
- Surface elevation: 420 m (1,380 ft)
- Islands: 1

Lac de Grangent is a lake in Loire, France. At an elevation of 420 m, its surface area is 3.65 km^{2}.
