= Île Barbe =

Island in the Saône, Lyon, France

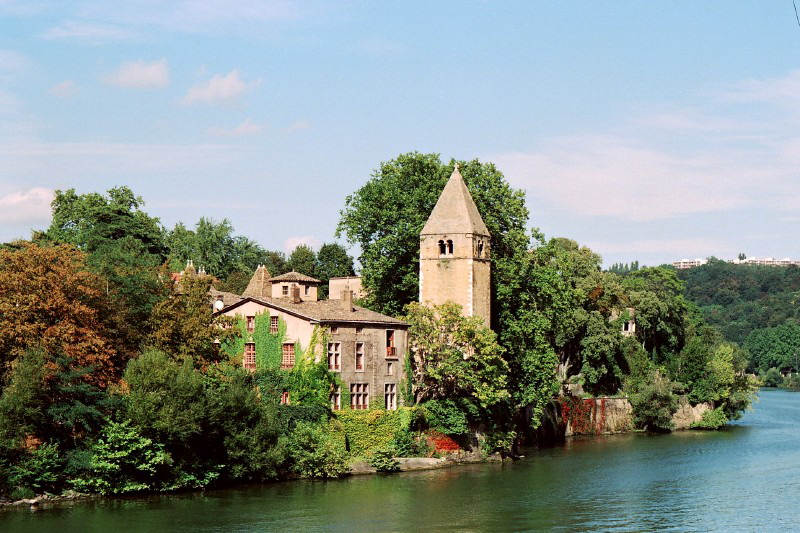
- Romanesque church of Notre-Dame

- Location within France

Geography
- Location: Saône
- Coordinates: 45°47′50″N 4°49′54″E
- Highest elevation: 171 m (561 ft)

Administration
- France
- Region: Auvergne-Rhône-Alpes
- Metropolis: Lyon
- Commune: Lyon

Île Barbe (French pronunciation: [il baʁb]; lit. 'Beard Island') is an island situated in the middle of the Saône, in the 9th arrondissement of Lyon, part of the Saint-Rambert-l'Île-Barbe quarter (a former commune annexed in 1963). Its name comes from the Latin insula barbara, "Barbarians' Island", suggesting that it was one of the last locales to be occupied (two centuries after the banks of the Saône were, at the foot of the hill of Fourvière).

== History ==
A monastery, later an abbey, was founded on the island in the 5th century. This was the first monastic establishment in the Lyon region and one of the oldest in all of Gaul. Charlemagne gave it a beautiful library.

The monastery, pillaged several times (in 676 and 725 by the Saracens, and in 937 by the Huns), adopted the Rule of Saint Benedict in the 9th century and gradually became wealthy.

In 816, Louis the Pious awarded the monastery:

- the right to maintain at all time three boats upon the Saône, the Rhône and the Doubs exempt from taxes for passage;
- a decree of immunity and protection for the monastery confirmed by Charles the Bald in 861.

At the beginning of the 16th century, the abbey passed into the ownership in commendam of the d'Albon family.

In 1549, the abbey was secularised and became a college of canons.

In 1562, it was looted and burned by the Protestant troops of François de Beaumont, baron des Adrets.

The college of canons was suppressed in 1741, and replaced by an establishment for aged or infirm priests, which was suppressed in its turn in 1783. At the Revolution, everything remaining on the island was sold and dispersed.

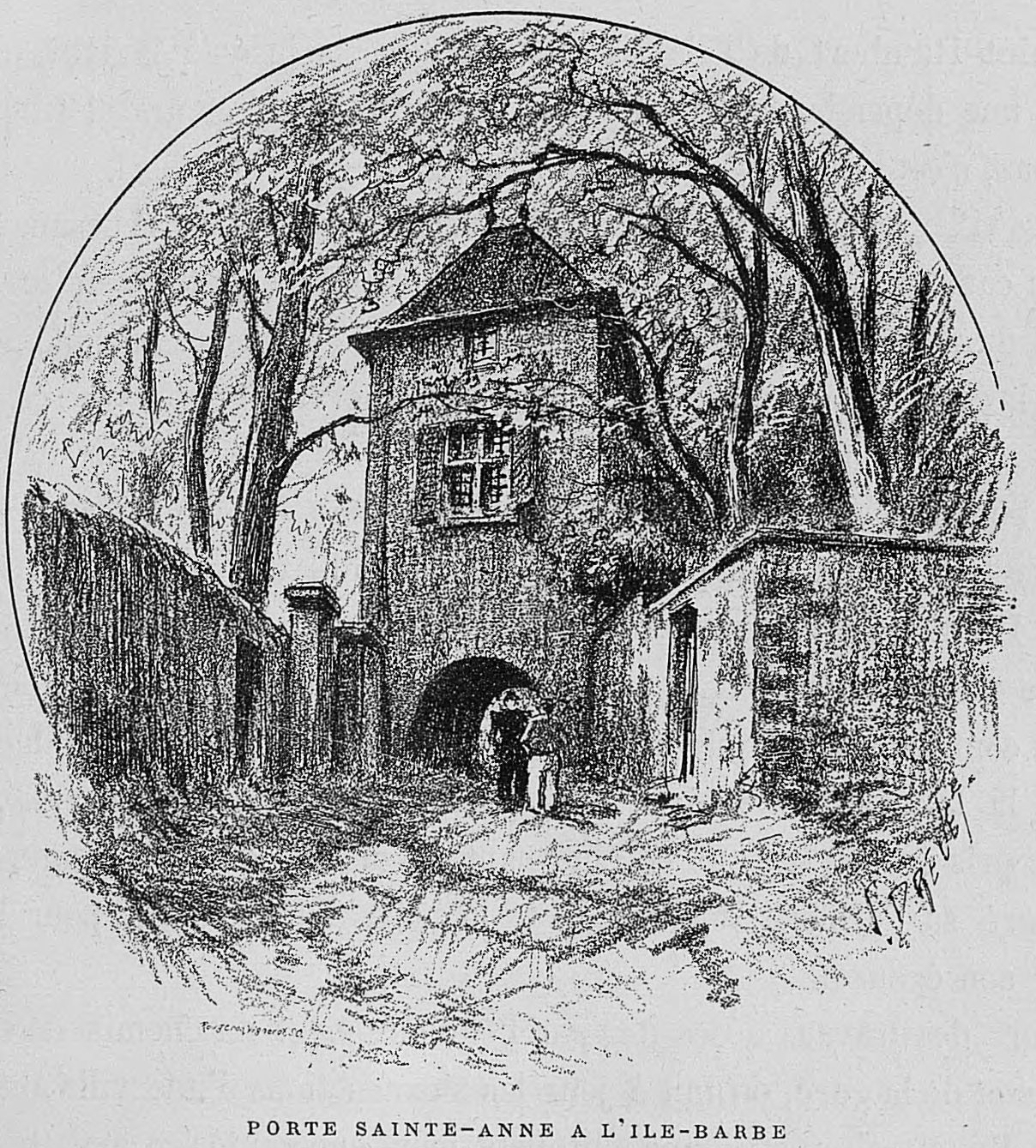
Porte Sainte-Anne illustrated by Joannès Drevet (1854–1940).

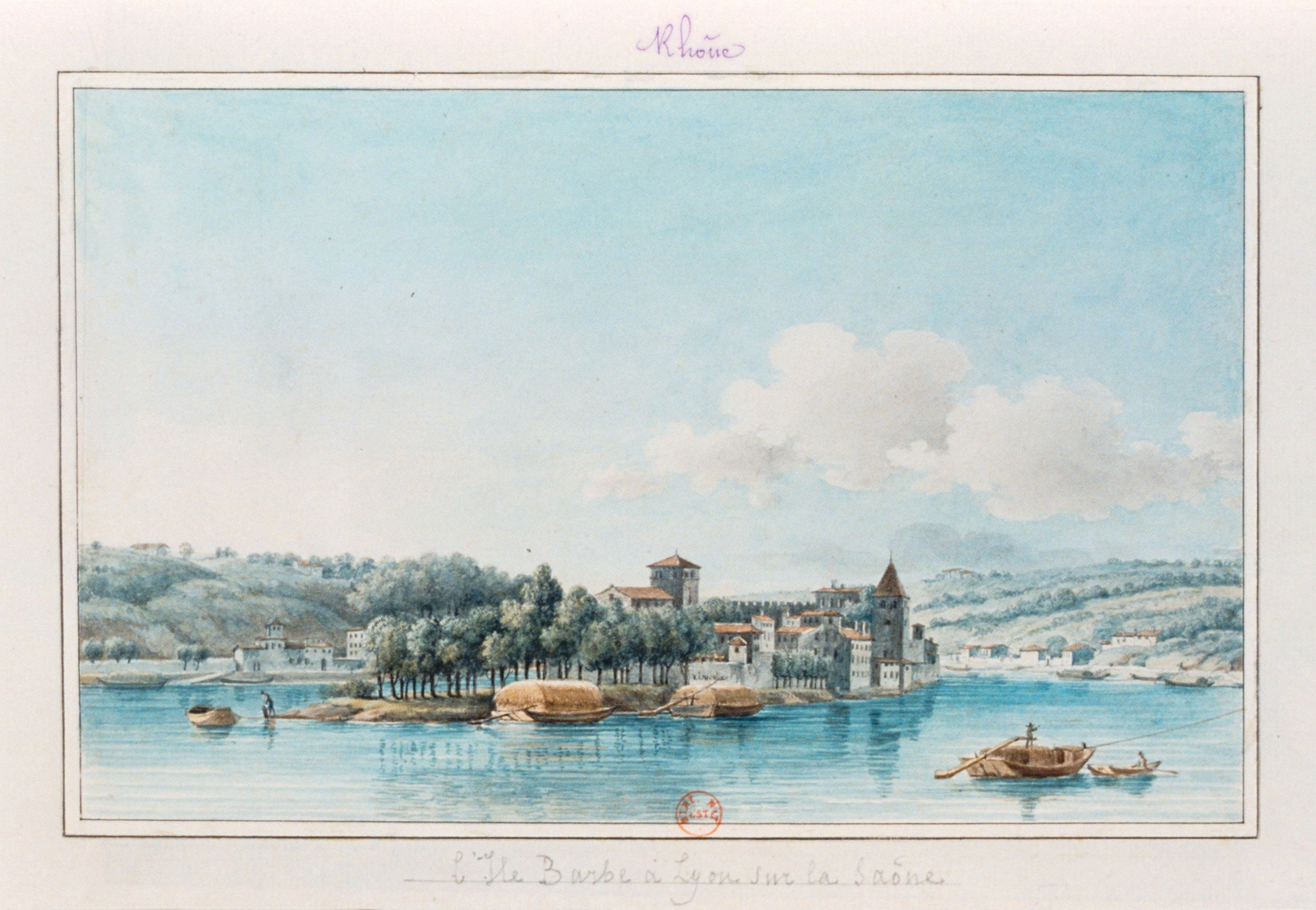
L'Île-Barbe at the beginning of the 19th century.

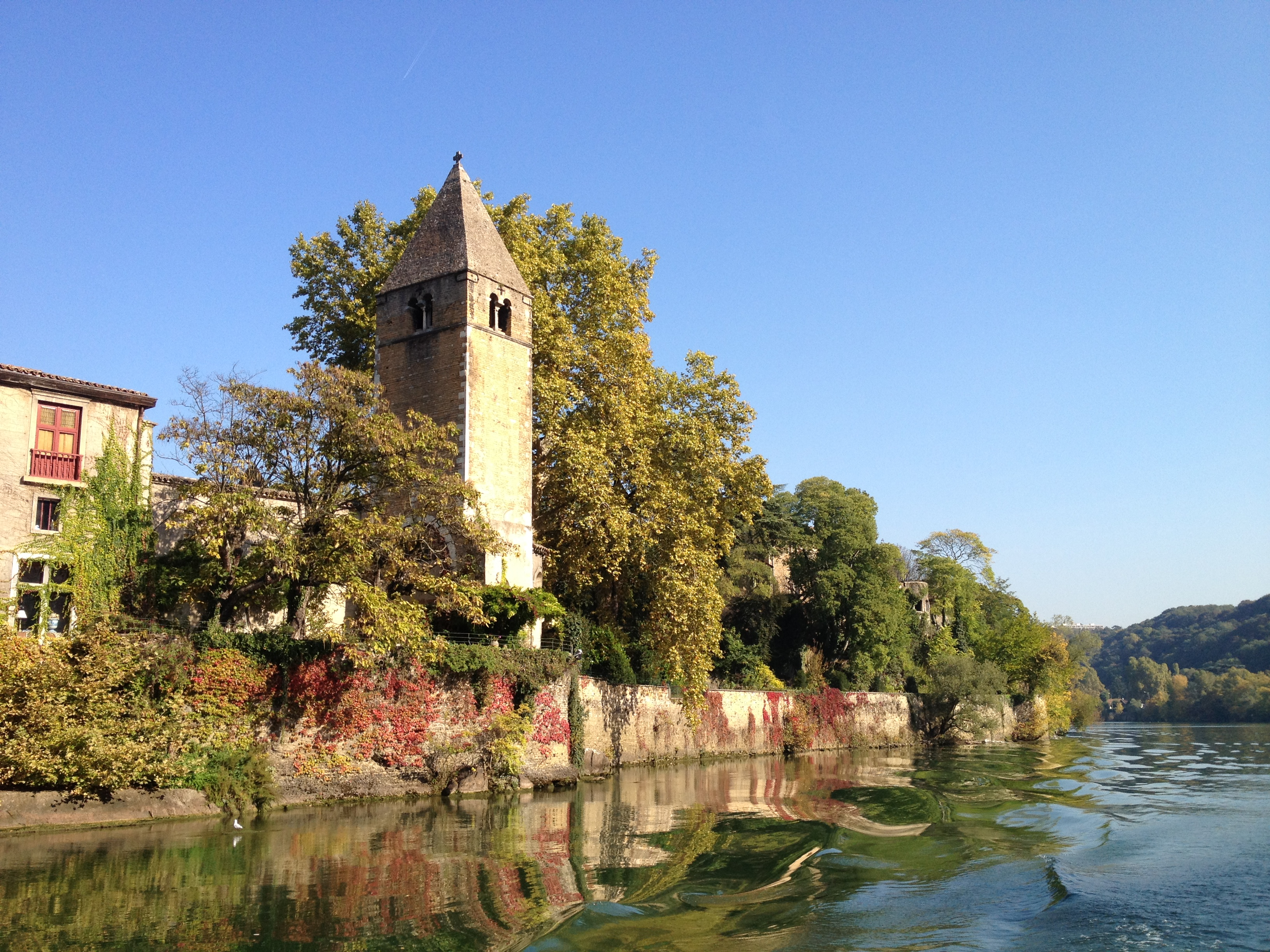
The Ile Barbe at Lyon today.

=== The first bridge ===
In the 17th century, or in 1734, the architect Cotton constructed a wooden bridge which provided access to the Ile Barbe In 1827, a suspension bridge replaced it (it is the oldest in Lyon still in service). It is reached from the Passerelle Masaryk and the Passerelle Saint-Vincent, crossing the island at the level of its southern point and permitting the linking of the left and right banks of the Saône, the villages of Saint-Rambert (today Lyon 9^{e}) and of Caluire-et-Cuire. During the years 1870–1880, three well-reputed rowing clubs were located here: the Aviron Club de Lyon-Caluire, the Aviron Union Nautique de Lyon (6^{e} club français) and the Cercle de l'Aviron de Lyon (5^{e} club français).

== The island today ==
In the 21st century, only the Romanesque church of Notre-Dame remains extant of the monastic buildings. Only the northern part of the Ile may be visited (about one-half of the island) which consists of a small number of exclusive old private homes and a few vestiges of ruined religious buildings. There is also a restaurant. There are also some remains of a lodging reconstructed in about 1840 as the Château de Saint-Rambert-l'Ile-Barbe also known as the Château du Fresnes, and another château, the Château du Chastelard of the 15th century, reconstructed in the 16th century.

The Ile is reached by a 10-minute bus ride from the gare de Vaise (bus TCL 31 et 43 côté Lyon-St Rambert), and 15 minutes from the Place Bellecour (bus TCL 40 côté Caluire). Tere is also a Vélo'v (bicycle sharing) point.

The Ile is composed of a public part – terrains for pétanque, a large lawn, a children's playground – and a private part reached via two roads, the Impasse Saint-Loup for reaching the restaurant and the Chemin du Bas-Port leading to the Saône). These two roads are not joined; the Impasse Saint-Loup ends at the door to a private courtyard.

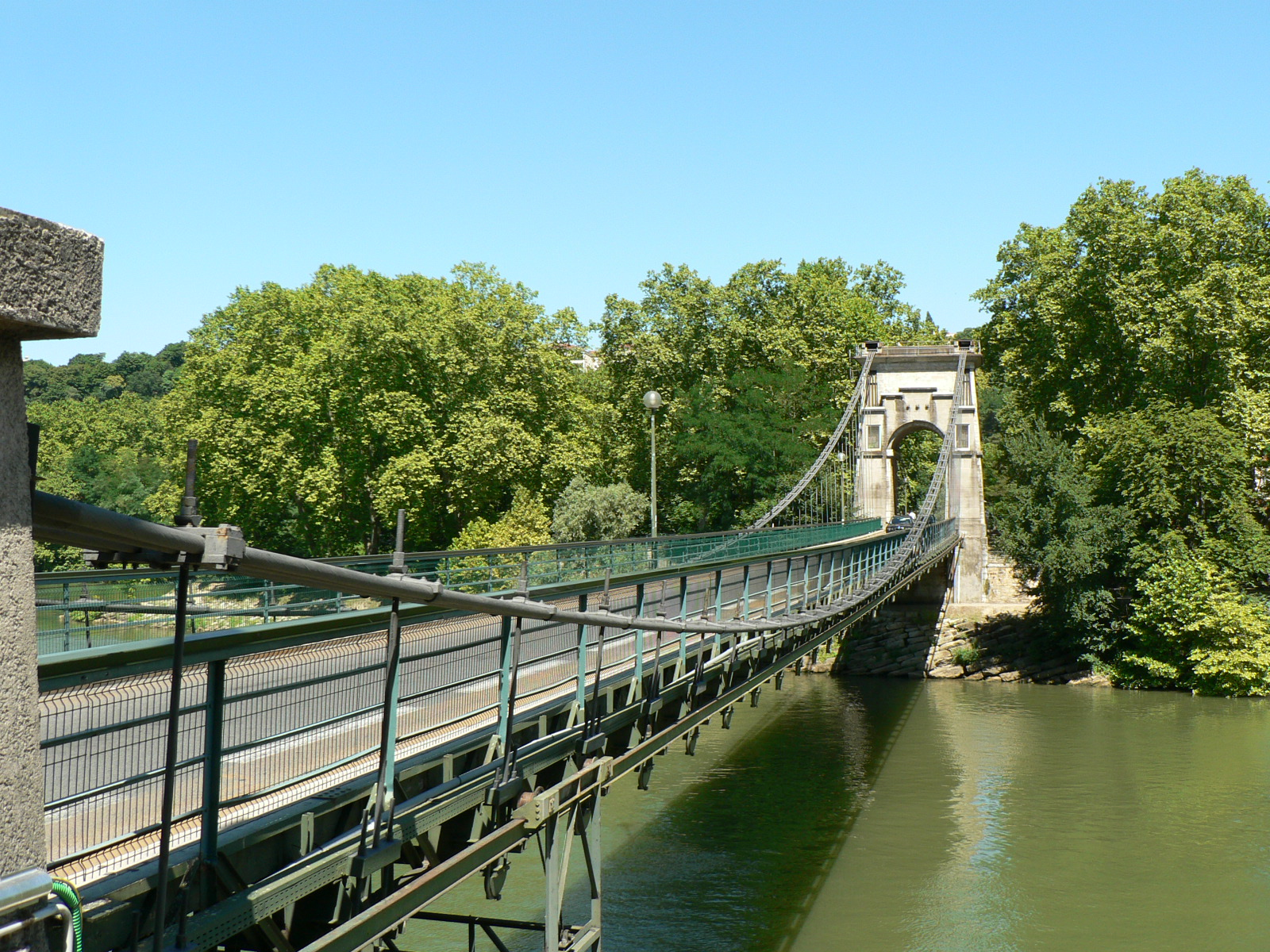
Pont de l'île Barbe

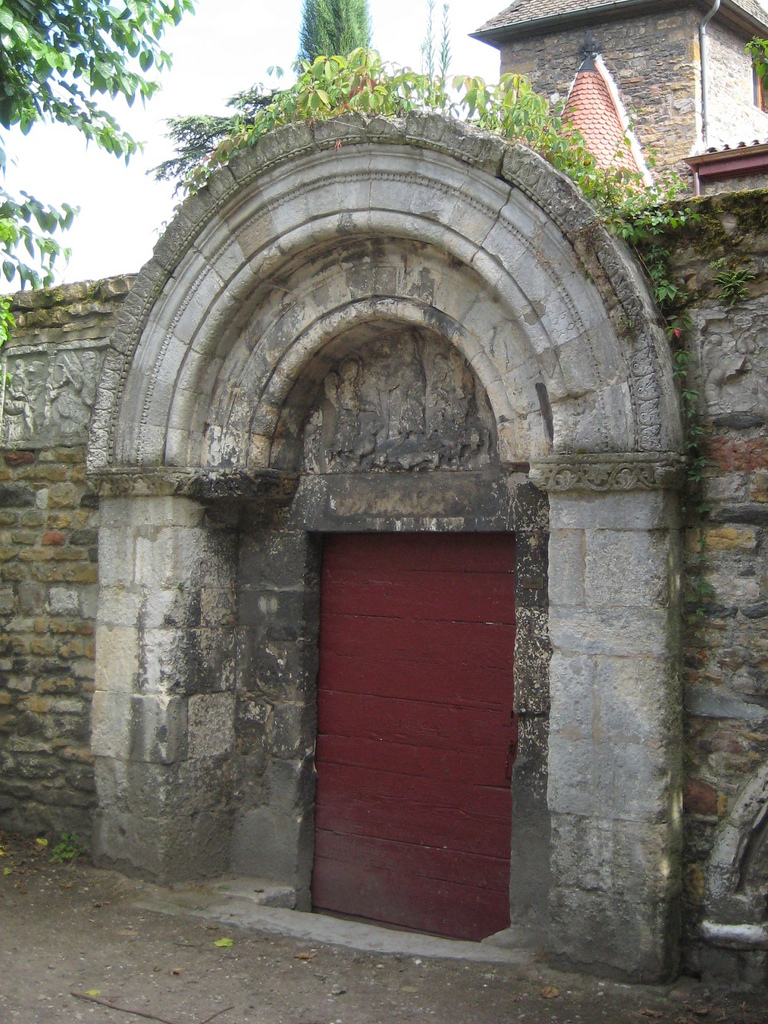
Remains of the church of Saint-Loup

== See also ==
=== Bibliography ===
- Claude Le Laboureur, Les masures de l'abbaye royale de l'isle Barbe lez Lyon, Lyon, 1665 online at Google Books, revised by M.-C. and G. Guigue, Lyon, 1887–1895.
- Bésian Arroy, Brève et dévote histoire de l'abbaye de l'Isle Barbe, Lyon, 1668.
- L. Niepce, L'île-Barbe. son ancienne abbaye et le bourg de Saint-Rambert, Lyon, 1890
- M.M. Bouquet, L'abbaye de l'Ile-Barbe, des origines à la sécularisation, in Positions de thèses de l'École des Chartes, Paris, 1938, pp. 13–21
- J. Picot, La seigneurie de l'abbaye de l'Ile-Barbe, Lyon, 1953
- J. Picot, Ile-Barbe, DHGE, XXV, 1995, c. 811–817
- J.-F. Reynaud, "Le monastère de l'Ile-Barbe et le bourd de Saint-Rambert" in Saint-Rambert, un culte régional depuis l'époque mérovingienne. Histoire et archéologie., Paris, 1995, pp. 49–60
- Michel Rubellin, Église et société chrétienne d'Agobard à Valdès, PUL, 2003, Lyon, pp. 265–275.
- Robert Favreau, "Un tympan roman à l'Île-Barbe près de Lyon" in Comptes rendus des séances de l'Académie des Inscriptions et Belles-Lettres, 2005, Vol. 149, n° 3, pp. 1007–1025
- Mémoire de pierres: Abbaye de l'Ile-Barbe, Lyon, 1995, Musée historique de Lyon, catalogue d'exposition Septembre 1995 - Janvier 1996, ISBN 2-901307-07-8

=== External links ===
- Historique de l'île Barbe jusqu'à nos jours
- les dimanches de l'île Barbe, festival estival de musique
