= Saint-Just-Saint-Rambert =

- Commune
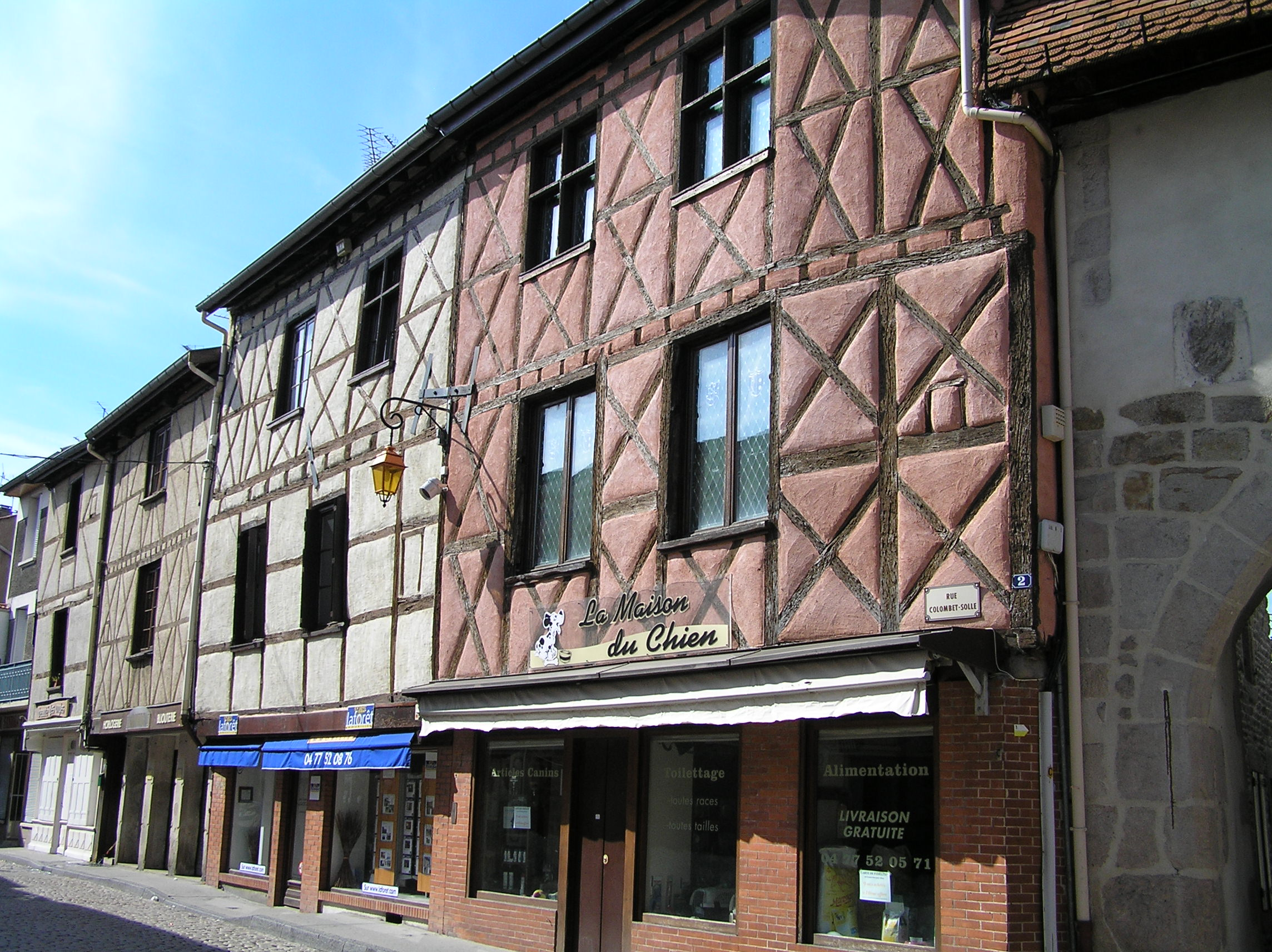

- Coat of arms
- Location of Saint-Just-Saint-Rambert
- Location within France Location within Auvergne-Rhône-Alpes
- Coordinates: 45°30′01″N 4°14′26″E
- Country: France
- Region: Auvergne-Rhône-Alpes
- Department: Loire
- Arrondissement: Montbrison
- Canton: Saint-Just-Saint-Rambert
- Intercommunality: CA Loire Forez

Government
  - Mayor (2020–2026): Olivier Joly
- Area^{1}: 40.63 km^{2} (15.69 sq mi)
- Elevation: 417 m (1,368 ft)
- Highest elevation: 673 m (2,208 ft)
- Lowest elevation: 358 m (1,175 ft)
- Population (2023): 15,764
  - Density: 388.0/km^{2} (1,005/sq mi)
- Time zone: UTC+01:00 (CET)
  - Summer (DST): UTC+02:00 (CEST)
- INSEE/Postal code: 42279 /42170
- ^{1} French Land Register data, which excludes lakes, ponds, glaciers > 1 km^{2} (0.386 sq mi or 247 acres) and river estuaries.

Saint-Just-Saint-Rambert (French pronunciation: [sɛ̃ ʒy(st) sɛ̃ ʁɑ̃bɛʁ]) is a commune in the Loire department in central France.

Saint-Just-Saint-Rambert was created in 1973 by the merger of two former communes: Saint-Just-sur-Loire and Saint-Rambert-sur-Loire.

== Population ==
The population data given in the table and graph below for 1954 and earlier refer to the former commune of Saint-Rambert-sur-Loire.

Historical population

Year	Pop.	±% p.a.
1793	2,300	—
1800	2,355	+0.34%
1806	2,556	+1.37%
1821	2,726	+0.43%
1831	3,015	+1.01%
1836	3,012	−0.02%
1841	3,078	+0.43%
1846	3,026	−0.34%
1851	2,759	−1.83%
1856	2,458	−2.28%
1861	2,545	+0.70%
1866	2,515	−0.24%
1872	2,400	−0.78%
1876	2,432	+0.33%
1881	2,619	+1.49%
1886	2,800	+1.35%
1891	2,989	+1.31%
1896	3,049	+0.40%
1901	3,240	+1.22%

Year	Pop.	±% p.a.
1906	3,135	−0.66%
1911	3,026	−0.71%
1921	2,796	−0.79%
1926	2,963	+1.17%
1931	2,982	+0.13%
1936	3,263	+1.82%
1946	2,994	−0.86%
1954	3,634	+2.45%
1962	7,419	+9.33%
1968	8,156	+1.59%
1975	9,010	+1.43%
1982	10,533	+2.26%
1990	12,299	+1.96%
1999	13,192	+0.78%
2007	14,542	+1.23%
2012	14,337	−0.28%
2017	15,083	+1.02%
2023	15,764	+0.74%

Source: EHESS and INSEE (1968-2023)

== Twin towns ==
Saint-Just-Saint-Rambert is twinned with:

- Târgu Neamț, Romania, since 1999

== See also ==
- Communes of the Loire department
- Saint-Just-Saint-Rambert Bridge
