= Gagnon (surname) =

Gagnon is a surname of French Canadian origin. Notable people with the surname include:

== A ==
- Aaron Gagnon (born 1986), Canadian ice hockey player
- Alain Gagnon (1938–2017), Canadian composer and educator
- Alphonse-Osias Gagnon (1860–1941), Canadian bishop
- André Gagnon (1942–2020), Canadian musician and composer
- André-Philippe Gagnon (born 1962), Canadian comedian and impressionist
- Aurore Gagnon (1909–1920), Canadian victim of child abuse

== C ==
- Cécile Gagnon (born 1936), Canadian writer and illustrator
- Charles Gagnon (1934–2003), Canadian artist
- Charles-Antoine-Ernest Gagnon (1846–1901), Canadian notary and politician
- Chick Gagnon (1897–1970), American baseball player
- Christiane Gagnon (born 1948), Canadian politician
- Clarence Gagnon (1881–1942), Canadian painter
- Claude Gagnon (born 1949), Canadian filmmaker
- Clovis Gagnon (1926–2022), Canadian politician
- Craig A. Gagnon (born 1960), American politician

== D ==
- Dave Gagnon (born 1967), Canadian ice hockey player
- Dave Gagnon (American football) (born 1951), American football player
- Drew Gagnon (born 1990), American baseball player

== E ==
- Édouard Gagnon (1918–2007), Canadian Roman Catholic cardinal
- Eric Gagnon (born 1971), American musician
- Ernest Gagnon (1834–1915), Canadian folklorist, composer and organist

== F ==
- Ferdinand Gagnon (1849–1886), Canadian-American journalist and publisher
- Francesca Gagnon (born 1957), Canadian singer and actress
- François Gagnon (politician) (1922–2017), Canadian politician
- François Gagnon (journalist) (born 1962), Canadian sports journalist
- François-Marc Gagnon (1935–2019), Canadian art historian and academic

== G ==
- Gabriel-Yvan Gagnon (born 1951), Canadian politician
- Gérard Gagnon (fl. 1970s), Canadian priest
- Germain Gagnon (1942–2014), Canadian ice hockey player
- Gregory Gagnon (born c. 1972), American military general
- Gustave Gagnon (1842–1930), Canadian organist, composer and educator

== H ==
- Henri Gagnon (1887–1961), Canadian composer, organist and educator
- Henri-Louis Gagnon (1881–1964), Canadian politician
- Hubert Gagnon (1947–2020), Canadian actor

== J ==
- Jean Gagnon, multiple people
- Jean-Paul Gagnon, Australian philosopher and academic
- Jean-Louis Gagnon (1913–2004), Canadian journalist, writer and public servant
- Jérémy Gagnon-Laparé (born 1995), Canadian soccer player
- Jimmy Gagnon, Canadian politician
- Joe Gagnon (1918–2001), Canadian boxer
- John Gagnon (1931–2016), American sociologist
- John B. Gagnon (1883–1939), American strongman performer
- Johnny Gagnon (1905–1984), Canadian ice hockey player
- Jonas Gagnon (1846–1915), American politician
- Joseph-William Gagnon (1879–1929), Canadian politician

== K ==
- Keith Gagnon (born 1987), Canadian ice dancer
- Kenneth Gagnon, American politician

== L ==
- Loïc Gagnon (born 1991), French footballer
- Louise Gagnon-Arguin (born 1941), Canadian archivist
- Lucien Gagnon (1793–1843), farmer and leader of the Lower Canada Rebellion
- Lysiane Gagnon (born 1941), Canadian journalist

== M ==
- Madeleine Gagnon (1938–2026), Canadian educator, literary critic and writer
- Marc Gagnon (born 1975), Canadian short track speed skater
- Marc-Antoine Gagnon (born 1991), Canadian freestyle skier
- Marcel Gagnon (politician) (1936–2025), Canadian politician
- Marcel Gagnon (musician) (born 1950), Canadian musician and substance abuse counsellor
- Mariano Gagnon (1929–2017), American Roman Catholic priest and missionary
- Marie-Claude Savard-Gagnon (born 1972), Canadian figure skater
- Marie-Michèle Gagnon (born 1989), Canadian alpine skier
- Marie-Pier Boudreau Gagnon (born 1983), Canadian synchronized swimmer
- Matthew Gagnon (born 1980), American political strategist and writer
- Maude Smith Gagnon (born 1980), Canadian poet
- Michel Kelly-Gagnon (born 1971), Canadian lawyer and businessperson
- Michelle Gagnon (born 1971), American crime novelist
- Mitch Gagnon (born 1984), Canadian mixed martial artist
- Monique Gagnon-Tremblay (born 1940), Canadian politician

== N ==
- Narcisse A. Gagnon (1835–1903), Canadian politician
- Noam Gagnon (born 1963), Canadian dancer

== O ==
- Onésime Gagnon (1888–1961), Canadian politician and lieutenant-governor of Québec

== P ==
- Patrice Gagnon (born 1963), Canadian canoeist
- Patrick Gagnon (born 1962), Canadian politician
- Paul Gagnon, multiple people
- Paul-Edmond Gagnon (1909–1981), Canadian politician
- Philippe Gagnon (1909–2001), Canadian politician
- Philippe Gagnon (Canadian football) (born 1992), Canadian football player
- Philippe Gagnon (swimmer) (born 1980), Canadian Paralympic swimmer
- Pierce Gagnon (born 2005), American actor
- Pierre-Luc Gagnon (born 1980), Canadian skateboarder

== R ==
- Raymond Gagnon (born 1948), American politician
- Réginald Charles Gagnon, known as Cayouche (1949–2024), Canadian musician
- Rene Gagnon (1925–1979), American soldier associated with the photograph Raising the Flag on Iwo Jima
- René Gagnon (painter) (1928–2022), Canadian painter
- Richard Gagnon (born 1948), Canadian bishop
- Roy Gagnon (1913–2000), American football player
- Robert A. J. Gagnon (born 1958), American theological scholar and author

== S ==
- Sean Gagnon (born 1973), Canadian ice hockey player
- Sébastien Gagnon (born 1973), Canadian politician
- Simon Gingras-Gagnon (born 1994), Canadian football player
- Sofiane Gagnon (born 1999), Canadian freestyle skier
- Sylvain Gagnon (born 1970), Canadian speed skater

== T ==
- Terry Gagnon (born 1962), Canadian volleyball player

== V ==
- Vincent Gagnon (born 1981), Canadian racquetball player

== Y ==
- Yannick Gagnon, Canadian politician
- Yechel Gagnon (born 1973), Canadian artist
- Yolande Gagnon, Canadian politician

== See also ==
- Gagné (surname)
