= Brucebo =

Artist estate in Gotland, Sweden

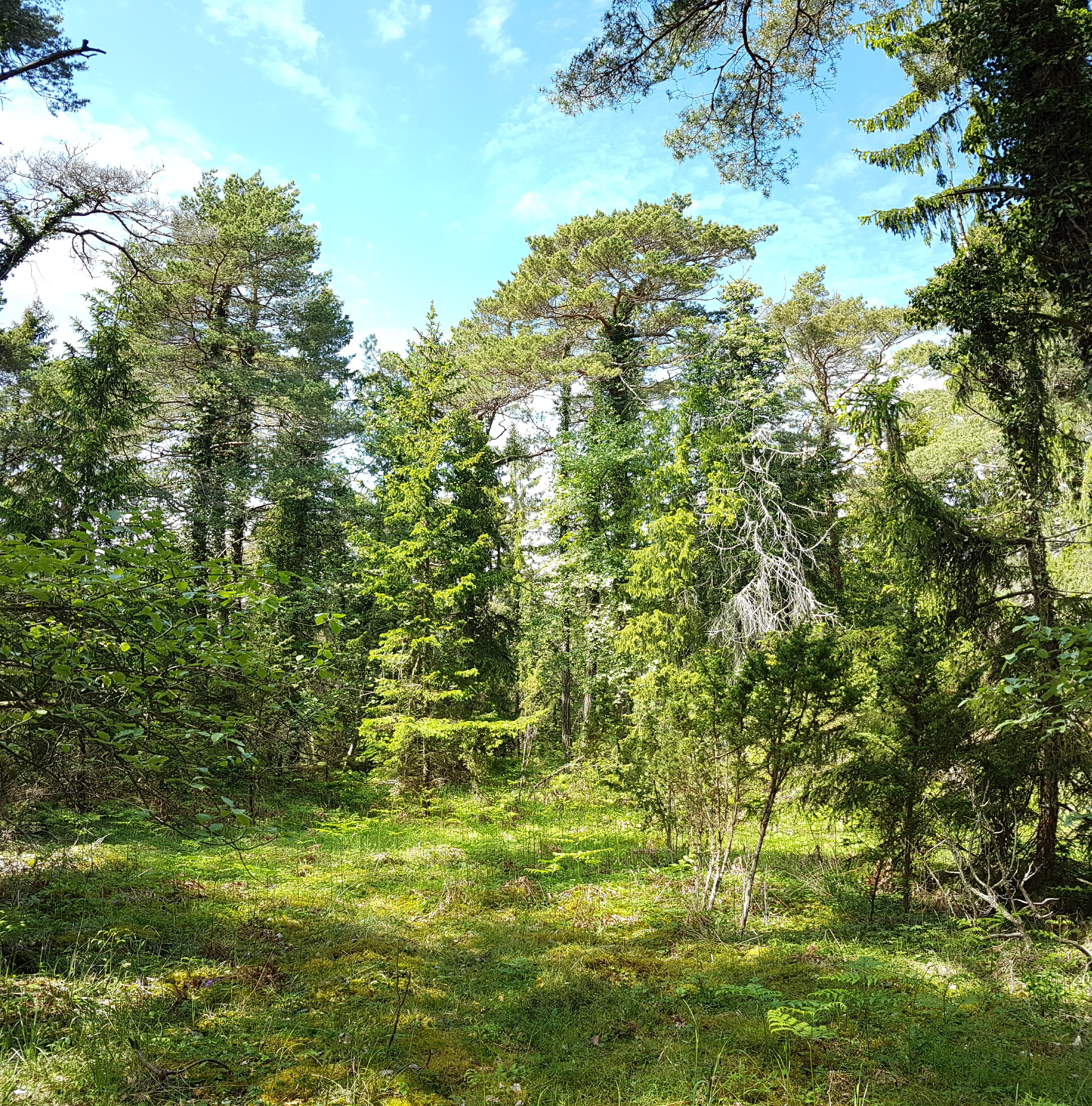
- Brucebo nature reserve
- Interactive map of Brucebo
- Location: Själsö, Väskinde, Gotland
- Nearest city: Visby
- Coordinates: 57°41′5″N 18°20′52″E
- Area: 35 ha (0.35 km^{2})
- Created: 1970
- Operator: Gotland County
- Open: All year
- Designation: Natura 2000

Brucebo is an artists' estate in Själsö, Väskinde on Gotland, Sweden, created by William Blair Bruce and his wife Carolina Benedicks-Bruce. The estate later became a nature reserve and an art museum managed by the Brucebo Foundation. The Bruce and Benedicks legacy also includes the Brucebo Fine Art Scholarship for young Canadian artists.

== The estate ==
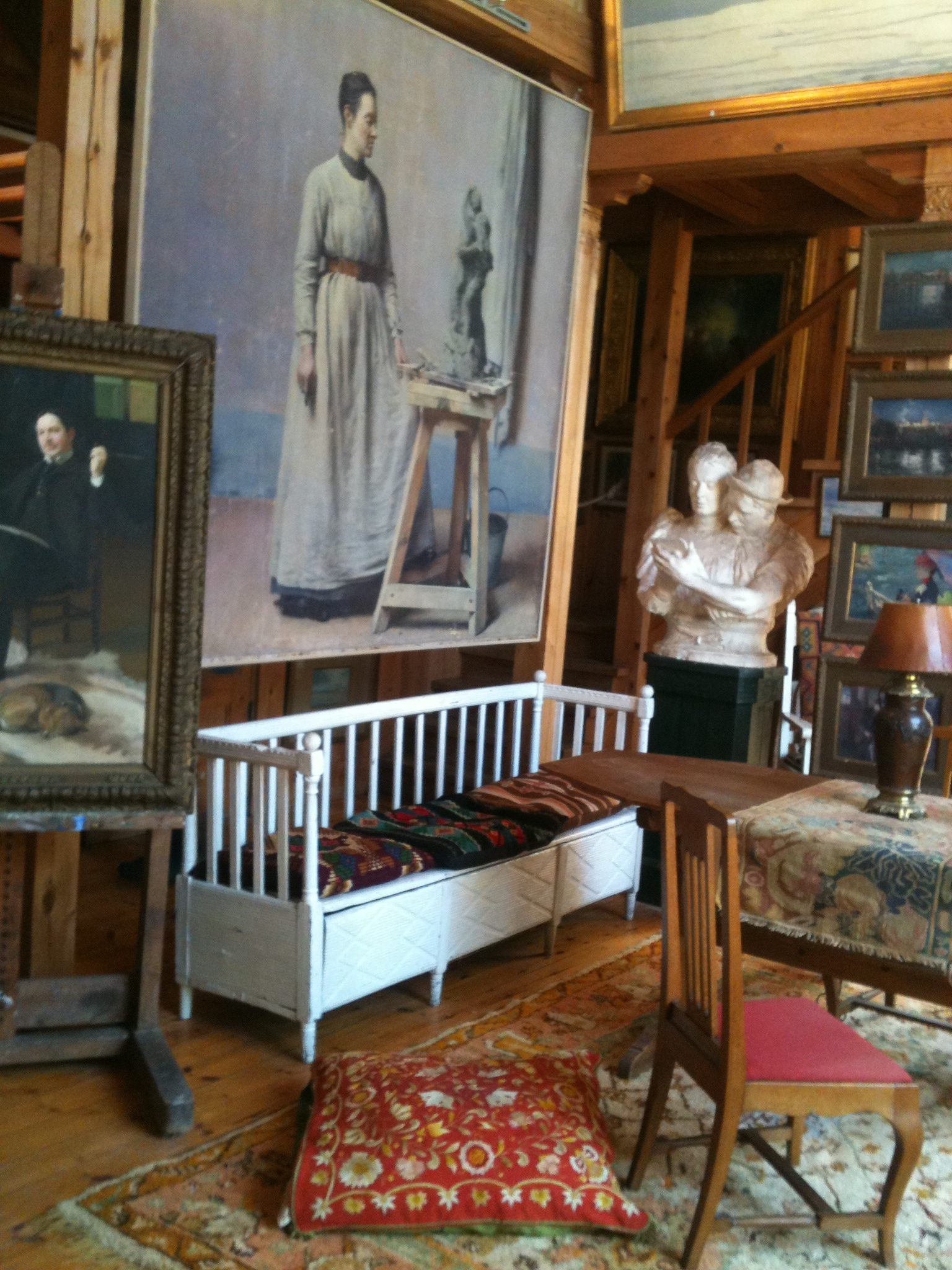
The studio in Brucebo, Bruce's self portrait (left) and full figure portrait of his wife

Brucebo was originally a summer house bought by William Blair Bruce and his wife Carolina Benedicks-Bruce. The estate is situated 8 km (5.0 mi) north of Visby. In 1900–06, the couple added a large extension to the small main house on the estate. The house was built in the neo-romantic style of the early 1900s. The new part of the house included a studio with large windows facing the sea. The idea behind the design of the house was to eliminate the line between the outdoors and the indoors. The couple created many artistic works at Brucebo and many of them can still be seen there, since the house has been converted into an art museum. The house and the museum are maintained and owned by the Brucebo Foundation.

The estate is 35 ha (0.35 km^{2}). In addition to the main house there are several buildings, most of which were constructed during 1900–06, when the extension to the main house was built. There is a pavilion, a forest studio, a beach studio, the Caretaker's House, a stable with an additional shed and an ice cellar made of limestone. The buildings are designed in the same style as the main house, except for the Caretaker's House, which is inspired by one of the houses at Standgatan in Visby, the Burmeister 4.

== History ==
In her will, Benedicks-Bruce, left Brucebo to a scholarship fund that would enable young Canadian and Swedish artists to come and stay at Brucebo. However, this program did not start until after a major renovation of the house a few years after her death. The estate served as a boardinghouse for artists for a while up until 1970, when it was designated a nature reserve. The Gotland Municipality owned Brucebo between 1971 and 1973.

In 1973, Brucebo was sold to Swedish TV-producer and director Torbjörn Axelman (born 1932) who started to renovate the main house and the estate. When Axelman's company went bankrupt in 1995, the Brucebo Foundation bought back the estate and Axelman stayed on as a tenant in the old part of the main house. With the foundation as owner, renovations were done at the house and plans to convert it to a museum were set in motion.

== Museum ==
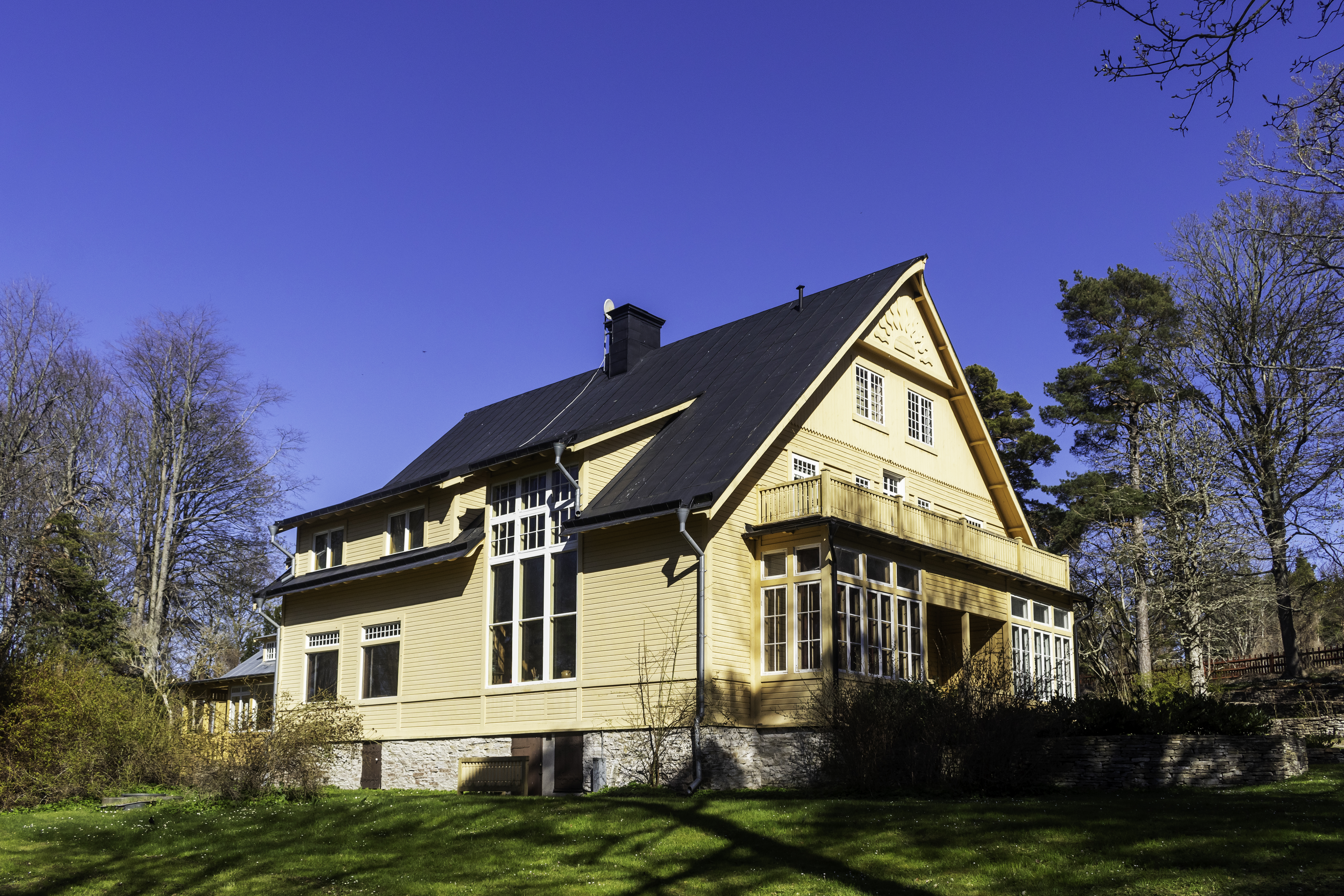
Brucebo main building and museum

In 2009, work began to convert the main house in Brucebo into a museum. The project was managed by the Brucebo Foundation. The house was cleaned, the original furniture was renovated and the art, comprising thousands of works, was brought to the Gotland Museum to be catalogued and restored. Everything was later brought back to the house and the ground floor was arranged in exactly the same way it had been when Bruce and Benedicks-Bruce lived there. The museum opened in 2012, and is open for pre-booked groups of visitors.

== Nature reserve ==
In 1970, the Brucebo estate was established as a nature reserve. The Brucebo nature reserve is mainly located in Visby, a minor part of it belongs to Väskinde socken. It is described as a "miniature Gotland" since all the different kinds of landscapes on the island are represented there. In 2005, it was designated as a Natura 2000 area.

The reserve is directly south of the museum and includes the Skansudd bird reserve and the cliff to its east, with a 100 by 60 m (330 by 200 ft) hill fort on the crest. The north and west sides of the fort are protected by steep slopes while the south and west sides have an embankment 92 m (302 ft) long, 3 m (9.8 ft) wide and 0.5 m (1.6 ft) high.

The crest of the cliff, where the limestone is bare, is a habitat for Cerastium pumilum, Cerastium semidecandrum, Potentilla neumanniana, Veronica spicata, Scabiosa columbaria and Pilosella peleteriana. Nearby, can be found stands of Artemisia rupestris, Sorbus rupicola, Cotoneaster niger, elderberry, Rosa mollis and sweet briar. There are grape vines and mahaleb cherrys, probably from seeds carried by birds, growing on a barrow near the hill fort. The area below the cliff is forested with firs and deciduous trees entwined with ivy. A number of rare and endangered species of fungi have also been registered in the reserve.

In the drop of the cliff is a small cave called the Brucebo Cave, where relics from an Iron Age settlement have been found.

== Brucebo Foundation ==
In 1972, the estate of Carolina Benedicks-Bruce created the Brucebo Fine Art Scholarship Foundation. The scholarship is given to younger Canadian artists, to come and stay, work and study at Brucebo on Gotland.

=== Scholarship recipients ===
Summer Residency and Travel Scholarship.

- 1972, Karen Madson Pascal
- 1973, Daphne Odjig-Bevon
- 1974, Tin Yum Lau
- 1975, John Lander
- 1976, Lupe Rodrigues
- 1977, Carole Rubin
- 1978, Michelle Desjardins
- 1979, —
- 1980, Roger Savage
- 1981, Thomas Corriveau
- 1982, Reginald Yates
- 1983, —
- 1984, David Abelson
- 1985, —
- 1986, Dawna Gallagher
- 1987, Terry Emrich
- 1988, Peter Raymond
- 1989 Jane Reagh
- 1999, G. Scott MacLeod
- 2000, —
- 2001, Eva Richardson, Laurel Smith
- 2002, Andrew Rucklidge, Yechel Gagnon
- 2003, Keer Tanchak
- 2004, Allison Katz, Alex Bartosik
- 2005, Alexandre Masino, Andrea Vander Kooij
- 2006, Natasha Mazurka, Geneviève Chevalier
- 2007, Francois Saint-Pierre, Allison Freeman
- 2008, Mark Prier, Josée Pedneault
- 2009, Amy Schissel, Elisabeth Belliveau
- 2010, Kristen Bjornerud, Andrew Morrow
- 2011, Daniel Hutchinson, Jessica Auer
- 2012, Véronique La Perrière, Rilla Marshall
- 2013, Sara A. Tremblay, Michael Dudeck
- 2014, Daniel Paterson, Jim Holyoak
- 2015, Jeremy Herndl, Liz Toohey-Weise
- 2016, Corri-Lynn Tetz. John Player
- 2017, Laura Findlay, Caroline Boileau

== Brucebo shooting ==
In 2008, the Brucebo Foundation's work with converting Brucebo into a museum started. The whole house was to be renovated and the previous owner, now tenant, Torbjörn Axelman was dismissed from his apartment in the main house in October that year. Axelman refused to accept this and held the chairman of the foundation, Joakim Hansson personally responsible for the decision.

On 1 December 2008, Hansson, his assistants and helpers arrived with a moving truck at Brucebo to collect the old furniture and the art and transport them to the Gotland Museum for restoration and cataloguing. Axelman resented this and at approximately 2:00 pm he pulled out a gun and shot Hansson three times, twice in the back and once in one of his hands. Hansson and two other persons managed to flee from the house out into the garden and three other persons, who were in the house, hid out on a balcony on the top floor.

When the local police came to Brucebo, they could not get Axelman to come out of the house. A team from the National Task Force were flown in from Stockholm. The police surrounded the house and at about 9:00 pm, they managed to bring Hansson and the rest of the personnel outside the house and on the balcony, to safety. Hansson was brought to hospital where his condition was declared as not critical. Shortly after 10:00 pm, Axelman came out of the house with a gun in his hand and started to shoot at the policemen, who returned fire and shot Axelman once in each thigh and once in the chest. Axelman was arrested and taken to hospital. He had lost a lot of blood and was treated for severe injuries.

On 5 February 2009, Axelman was found guilty by the Gotland district court, of three charges of attempted murder. According to the Swedish National Board of Forensic Medicine, Axelman suffered from a severe mental disorder and in need of psychiatric treatment. The district court's sentence was established by the Svea Court of Appeal on 10 June 2010. He was sentenced to psychiatric care at a closed institution. In October 2011, Axelman was moved from closed to open care, with a restriction that he was forbidden to visit Gotland. In March 2012, he was released from care and the restriction was lifted.

== See also ==
- Carl Larsson's Sundborn
- Anders Zorn's Zorngården
