= Gagner =

Gagner is a surname. Notable people with the surname include:

- Dave Gagner (born 1964), Canadian hockey player, Olympics competitor, and businessman; father of Sam Gagner
- Larry Gagner (born 1943), American football player
- Sam Gagner (born 1989), Canadian ice hockey player; son of Dave Gagner

== See also ==
- Gagne (surname)
- Gagnon (surname)
