= Elisabeth Belliveau =

Canadian interdisciplinary artist and author

Elisabeth Belliveau (born November 27, 1979) is a Canadian interdisciplinary artist and author of five graphic novels. Currently based in Treaty Six Territory, Amiskwaciwâskahikan, Edmonton, Alberta, she is an assistant professor of fine arts at Grant MacEwan University Faculty of Fine Arts and Communications. She previously taught at the Grande Prairie Regional College in Alberta, and at Concordia University in Montreal.

Belliveau served on the board of directors for one of the province's largest and oldest centres for Canadian contemporary art, Latitude 53, and is an advisory council member for Grant MacEwan University's John and Maggie Mitchell Gallery in Edmonton, Alberta. Met with high approbation, Belliveau's works have been endorsed internationally by the Andy Warhol Foundation for the Visual Arts, and the New York State Council on the Arts. In Canada, her works have found the support of the Canadian Council for the Arts, the Conseil des arts et des lettres du Québec, and the Alberta Foundation for the Arts.

== Early life and education ==
Belliveau was born in Antigonish, Nova Scotia in 1979. In 2001, she obtained a BFA Honours in Sculpture at the Alberta University of the Arts in Calgary, Alberta. In 2009, after completion of her MFA in Fibres at Concordia University in Montréal, Quebec, Belliveau was awarded the William Blair Bruce Scholarship.

== Career ==
Belliveau's current practice is focused primarily on the conventions of contemporary still life. In exploration of the genre through a "feminist lens," she compares the conditions that have, and have not, permitted women's participation - and subsequent recognition - within the world of the fine arts. In reflection of how "women [have] embedded their stories [into], and subverted [the] genre" of still life, and in consideration of the many ways one's gender may influence their inclusion within cultural institutions and discourse historically, Belliveau presents an argument for women's contributions and innovations within the arts.

Belliveau notes that she first became interested in still life, and the implications of the genre, while in attendance at a residency in which her residency mentor, August Klintberg, had banded together a group of artists all interested in the genre. While at the Centre for the Arts in Banff, Alberta as an artist in residence, Belliveau further considered the implications of various sub-genres found commonly within the genre of still life, particularly that of the "breakfast still life." In an interview for Edmonton, Alberta's SNAP Gallery, Belliveau shares that she was profoundly moved by the sub-genre's "depictions of the abundance and decadence and all the wasted food, after the party." Often calling into question issues of equitable access, and in the artist's choosing to work within a range of both traditional and digital mediums, Belliveau's multidisciplinary practice often ventures further to "reimagine the boundaries of waste and aestheticism."

=== Residencies ===
In 2002, Belliveau was awarded her first ever residency at the Banff Centre for the Arts in Banff, Alberta. In the years following her attendance of the Banff Centre's "Beauty Thematic Residency," Belliveau would be granted a multitude of opportunities for artistic residency across Canada. Between 2002 and 2009, Belliveau would be chosen as the artist in residence in institutes spanning from the Canadian Yukon, at the Klondike Institute for Arts and Culture in Dawson City, in 2006, to Canada's easternmost provinces, at the Struts Gallery in Sackville, New Brunswick, in 2007, and the Anchor Archive in Halifax, Nova Scotia, in 2009.

In 2010, Belliveau would travel internationally for her first residency abroad, after being awarded attendance to the Women's Studio Workshop in Rosendale, New York. Notably, between the years of 2016–2017, Belliveau was chosen as the artist in residence at the CALQ/Tokyo Wondersite in Japan, as awarded by the Conseil des Arts et des Lettres de Quebec. In the years following, Belliveau would be awarded for further opportunity to study abroad, and was granted residency at both Studio Kura in Fukuoka, Japan, and at Youkoba in Tokyo, Japan, both in 2018.

== Work ==
=== Exhibitions ===
In 2019 she was one of 39 artists chosen to exhibit at the MOMENTA Biennale de l’image. As a featured artist of the Biennale's sixteenth edition, The Life of Things, which aimed to "[address] the relationships built between individuals and their environment," Belliveau's submission to the group exhibition was a video installation entitled Still Life with Fallen Fruit (after a Breath of Life, Clarice Lispector) (2017-2019). In this work, Belliveau "presents multiple compositions in which the artificial and the natural merge and life and death are alternately transposed from one thing to another." Belliveau presents her audiences with a complicated narrative tethered to notions of sentientness, decay, and transformation. In clouding the boundaries that may exist between planes of the "living inanimate," Belliveau's video installation documents her time spent as an artist in residence in the Itoshima region of Japan, and "testif[ies] to an erratic, organic dimension that exists outside the process of categorization."

In 2020, Belliveau's works were featured at the Remai Modern in Saskatoon, Saskatchewan as part of the collaborative exhibition, BorderLINE: 2020 Biennial of Contemporary Art. Chosen as one of thirty artists across two provinces and five treaty territories, Belliveau's submission contributed to the exhibition's overall calling to attention of how notions of place - and displacement - are enforced by imaginary 'borders' within our sociopolitical structures. The Biennial of Contemporary Art's official statement notes that all submitted works act to "[call] attention to how borders are expressed, who can enforce them, and what is confined by their limits." Compiled and organized collaboratively by both the Art Gallery of Alberta and Saskatoon's Remai Modern Gallery, the exhibition ran concurrently in both cities, with different artists and their works being presented in both Edmonton, Alberta and Saskatoon, Saskatchewan between September 26, 2020 - January 3, 2021, and between September 26 - February 14, 2021, respectively. Belliveau's installation works featured at the Remai Modern.

=== Public collections ===
Belliveau has two works in the Alberta Foundation for the Arts collection. A selection of her works have also been collected by ARTEXT Montreal, the Confederation Centre for the Arts Prince Edward Island, Musée Ambulant Quebec City QC, Brucebo Foundation Sweden, Women's Studio Workshop NY, [and] various [other] private national and international collections.

=== Publications ===
Since 2010, Belliveau has published four graphic novels. Belliveau's published works take a biographical, often diaristic approach, documenting her daily life and subjective experiences as a contemporary female artist working presently. In an interview for Edmonton, Alberta's SNAP Gallery, Belliveau suggests that she has been particularly interested in the ways “women’s stories [have] [been] preserved through diaries, journals, and letters” throughout her studies as an academic and as a multidisciplinary artist.

In the summer of 2022, Belliveau published the graphic novel Condo Lady with Conundrum Press. It comprises four short chapters on the daily life of a lady in a 680 sq ft condo in Edmonton navigating pregnancy and teaching during the pandemic. Her previous graphic novels include One Year in America and Something to Pet the Cat About
