= Gagne =

Gagne and Gagné are two distinct French surnames. The name Gagné is more common in France. Gagne is also the name of three minor French rivers. People with these surnames include:

== Gagne ==
- Al Gagne (1941–2020), American curler
- Greg Gagne (baseball) (born 1961), American baseball player
- Greg Gagne (wrestler) (born 1948), American wrestler; son of Verne Gagne
- Jacob Gagne (born 1993), American motorcycle racer
- Jacqueline Gagne (born c. 1961), American golfer
- Leslie Gagne (1908–1962), Canadian ski jumper and Olympics competitor
- Michaela Gagne (born 1982), American beauty pageant contestant and Miss Massachusetts 2006
- Norman Gagne (1911–1986), Canadian ski jumper and Olympics competitor
- Paulin Gagne (1808–1876), French poet, essayist, lawyer, politician, inventor, and eccentric
- Pierre Gagne (born 1940), Canadian ice hockey player
- Stéphane Gagne (born 1969), French sport shooter and Olympics competitor
- Verne Gagne (1926–2015), American wrestler, wrestling trainer and promoter, and football player; father of wrestler Greg Gagne

== Gagné ==
- André Gagné (born ?), Canadian religious academic and researcher
- Armand Gagné (1771–1792), French courtier, involuntary royal adoptee, and revolutionary
- Art Gagné (1896–1988), Canadian ice hockey player
- Cedric Gagné-Marcoux (born 1982), Canadian football player
- Éric Gagné (born 1976), Canadian baseball player
- France Gagné (born ?), Canadian discus and javelin thrower, shot putter, and Paralympic medalist
- Gabriel Gagné (born 1996), Canadian ice hockey player
- Jean Alfred Gagné (1842–1910), Canadian lawyer, merchant, judge, and politician
- Jean Gagné (ringname: Don Gagné; 1947–2016), Canadian wrestler
- Jessica Lee Gagné (born 1988), Canadian cinematographer
- Jocelyne Gagné (born ?), Canadian judge
- Kevin Gagné (born 1992), Canadian ice hockey player
- Kevin Régimbald-Gagné (born 1987), Canadian football player
- Louis-Philippe Gagné (1900–1964), Canadian-born American journalist, political columnist, politician, and snowshoe enthusiast
- Madame Gagné (fl.1886–1891), Canadian portrait photographer
- Malvina Gagné (1837–1920), Canadian educator, Ursuline nun, and monastery founder
- Marie-Pierre Gagné (born 1983), Canadian synchronized swimmer and Olympics competitor
- Michel Gagné (born 1965), Canadian cartoonist and animated film director
- Paul Gagné (1962–2025), Canadian ice hockey player and coach
- Paul Gagné (translator) (born 1961), Canadian translator
- Philippe Gagné (born 1997), Canadian diver
- Priscilla Gagné (born 1986), Canadian judoka and Paralympic medalist
- Raphaël Gagné (born 1987), Canadian cross-country mountain biker
- Raymonde Gagné (born 1956), Canadian politician and academic
- Robert M. Gagné (1916–2002), American educational psychologist and theorist
- Roméo Gagné (1905–1959), Canadian politician
- Simon Gagné (born 1980), Canadian ice hockey player and Olympic medalist
- Stéphane Gagné (born 1969), Canadian former gangster, outlaw biker and contract killer
- Wayne Gagné (born 1964), Canadian ice hockey player

== See also ==
- Gagner (surname)
- Gagnon (surname)
- Gagny, Ivory Coast, a village sometimes spelled "Gagné"
