= Torbjörn Axelman =

Swedish producer (1932–2023)

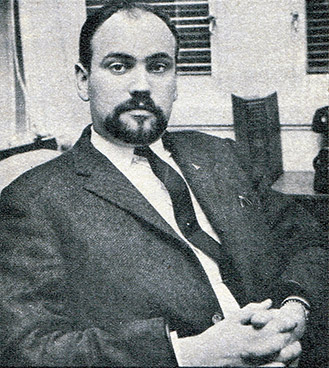
- Axelman circa 1967
- Born: Lars Gunnar Torbjörn Axelman; 28 April 1932; Eskilstuna, Sweden
- Died: 25 February 2023 (aged 90); Stockholm, Sweden
- Occupations: TV producer, director, writer
- Years active: 1956–2011
- Spouse: Saima Liiver (m. 1953; div. 1970)
- Partner: Louise Brattberg (1967–1990s)
- Children: 4

Lars Gunnar Torbjörn Kullänger-Axelman (28 April 1932 – 25 February 2023) was a Swedish television producer, director and writer.

== Early life ==
Axelman was born on 28 April 1932 in Eskilstuna, Sweden, the son of Valdemar Axelman, a bookseller, and his wife Märtha (née Engström). He passed studentexamen in Örebro in 1951 and received a Bachelor of Arts degree in 1955 and a Master of Philosophy degree from Uppsala University in 1956.

== Career ==
Axelman did TV studies in England in 1956 and the United States in 1961 and 1966. Axelman was a journalist at Nerikes Allehanda and Tidningen Upsala periodically from 1952 to 1966 and was a producer at Sveriges Television and Sveriges Radio from 1956 to 1985. He produced cultural programs Prisma from 1958 to 1961 and several programs together with the artist Ardy Strüwer and Lasse Åberg.

Axelman was also a painter and book illustrator and held solo exhibitions in Uppsala in 1953 and 1954, Visby in 1983, 1985, 1987–1989, Stockholm 1986–1989, Grythyttan in 1987, Monaco in 1989, London in 1990 and in New York City in 1990. He was also part of joint exhibition, for example at the Liljevalchs konsthall in 1961. Axelman was also CEO of AB Stockholms Aero from 1984 and he was a member of the Society Stallbröderna.

== Personal life ==
=== Brucebo shooting ===
Around two o'clock in the afternoon of 1 December 2008, Axelman shot the chairman of the Brucebo Foundation, Joakim Hansson in the back at Brucebo north of Visby on Gotland. There had been a dispute between the owner of the house, the Brucebo Foundation, and Torbjörn Axelman, who previously owned the house and now rented a part of it. Axelman had lived in the house for more than 30 years, but now he would be dismissed from his lease. The trigger to the drama was when the foundation's chairman came to get the fixtures in the house. On Monday morning, the chairman of the Brucebo Foundation and an assistant were driving a truck to Brucebo to retrieve paintings, sculptures and other works of art. The intention was that the works would be recorded, cleaned and restored and then returned.

A large police force was sent to the scene as well as the National Task Force. When Axelman voluntarily came out of the house at ten o'clock in the evening, he was armed and fired shots at the police. The Task Force shot Axelman in the chest and a shot in each thigh. Axelman lost a lot of blood and late at night he was treated for his gunshot wounds which was serious but not life-threatening. Hansson was consulted by the police and treated for gunshot wounds in the back, chest and hand. His general condition was described as non-life-threatening.

On 5 February 2009, Axelman was found guilty by the Gotland District Court, of three charges of attempted murder. According to the Swedish National Board of Forensic Medicine, Axelman suffered from a severe mental disorder and in need of psychiatric treatment, and that there was a risk that he would commit further offenses. The district court's sentence was established by the Svea Court of Appeal on 10 June 2010. In April 2012, Uppsala Administrative Court decided that Axelman would be released.

== Personal life ==
Torbjörn Axelman was married from 1953 to 1970 to the Estonia-born library assistant Saima Liiver (1932–2007), with whom he had a son, Stefan Kullänger (born 1953). He lived from 1967 with Louise Brattberg and had three children with her. They lived together on Lidingö but separated in the 1990s.

== Death ==
Axelman died on 25 February 2023, at the age of 90.

== Filmography ==
Axelman's filmography:

=== Director ===
- Oidentifierad Huset
- Oj oj oj eller Sången om den eldröda hummern (1966)
- Kanariehunden (1967)
- Lejonsommar (1968)
- Het snö (1968)
- Kameleonterna (1969)
- Gotlandsturisten (1969)
- Amiralsskeppet Rikswasa (1969)
- Tagning Ljusår
- Smoke (1971)
- Sanningens ögonblick (1974)
- Må vårt hus förskonas från tigrar (1975)
- Fata Morgana (1979)
- Flygnivå 450 (1980)

=== Screenplay ===
- Oj oj oj eller Sången om den eldröda hummern (1966)
- Lejonsommar (1968)
- Het snö (1968)
- Kameleonterna (1969)
- Smoke (1971)
- Sanningens ögonblick (1974)
- Må vårt hus förskonas från tigrar (1975)
- Flygnivå 450 (1980)

=== Idea ===
- Oj oj oj eller Sången om den eldröda hummern (1966)

=== Producer ===
- Het snö (1968)
- Smoke (1971)
- Må vårt hus förskonas från tigrar (1975)
- Oidentifierad Medeltid (1991)

=== Production manager ===
- Lejonsommar (1968)

=== Music ===
- Smoke (1971)

=== Roles ===
- Oj oj oj eller Sången om den eldröda hummern (1966)
- Lejonsommar (1968)
- Må vårt hus förskonas från tigrar (1975)
