= Democratic Theory =

Academic journal

- Discipline: Political Theory
- Language: English
- Edited by: Emily Beausoleil, Victoria University of Wellington; Jean-Paul Gagnon, University of Canberra

Publication details
- History: 2014–Present
- Publisher: Berghahn (United States)
- Frequency: Biannually

Standard abbreviations
- ISO 4: Democr. Theory

Indexing
- ISSN: 2332-8894 (print); 2332-8908 (web)

Links
- Journal homepage

Democratic Theory is a peer-reviewed journal published and distributed by Berghahn.

It is published biannually. The Journal is managed by an editorial team consisting of Jean-Paul Gagnon from the University of Canberra, and Emily Beausoleil from the Victoria University of Wellington. The Journal encourages philosophical and interdisciplinary contributions that critically explore democratic theory—in all its forms. Spanning a range of views, the journal offers a cross-disciplinary forum for diverse theoretical questions to be put forward and systematically examined. It advances non-Western as well as Western ideas and is actively based on the premise that there are many forms of democracies and many types of democrats.

It is subscribed to by 398 of the libraries covered by WorldCat.

== Founders ==
Democratic Theory was co-founded by Mark Chou, from the Australian Catholic University, and Jean-Paul Gagnon, from the University of Canberra.

== Ranking ==
According to SCImago Journal Rank (SJR), this journal has a Q3 ranking in Sociology and Political Science. SCImago Journal Rank is an indicator, which measures the scientific influence of journals. It considers the number of citations received by a journal and the importance of the journals from where these citations come.
