= Emily Beausoleil =

American philosopher

Emily Beausoleil is a Canadian political theorist and lecturer of political science at the Victoria University of Wellington in New Zealand. She is the co-editor of the academic journal Democratic Theory along with Jean-Paul Gagnon.

Beausoleil has an h-index of 7.

In 2021, Beausoleil was awarded the New Zealand Early Career Research Excellence Award for Social Sciences by the Royal Society Te Apārangi. In 2024, she was awarded the APSA Distinguished Award for Civic and Community Engagement for her work in countering online anti-Māori hate.

== Education ==
- PhD (Political Theory), University of British Columbia, Vancouver, Canada
- MA (English Literature), University of British Columbia, Vancouver, Canada
- Bachelor of Humanities (Highest Hons), Carleton University, Ottawa, Canada
