= Carolina Benedicks-Bruce =

Swedish sculptor (1856–1935)

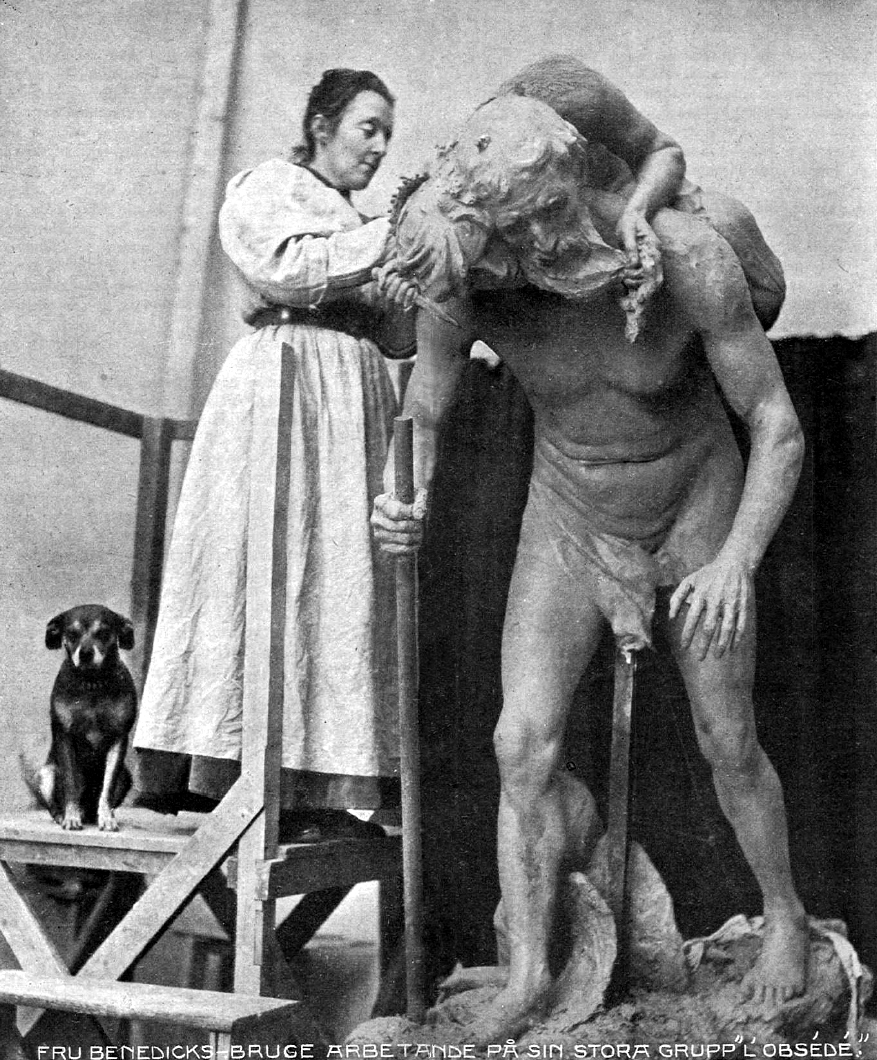
- Carolina Benedicks-Bruce with L'obsédé
- Born: Carolina Maria Benedicks; 28 October 1856; Stockholm, Sweden
- Died: 16 February 1935 (aged 78); Visby, Sweden
- Known for: Brucebo
- Notable work: The wounded bather
- Spouse: William Blair Bruce
- Awards: Mention Honorable, le Salon, Paris; 1893
- Website: brucebo.se

Carolina Maria Benedicks-Bruce (28 October 1856 – 16 February 1935) was a Swedish sculptor. After studies at the Academy of Arts in Sweden she went to France, at first to study and later to live and work at the artists' colony in Grez-sur-Loing where she met her husband William Blair Bruce. With him she returned to Sweden and together they created the artists estate Brucebo on Gotland, which was later established as a nature reserve. She also worked actively with the preservation of heritage buildings, women's right to vote and establishing the Swedish Women's Voluntary Defence Organization.

== Early life and education ==
Benedicks, born on 28 October 1856 in Stockholm, was the daughter of Karolina Charlotta (born Cantzler) and Edward Otto Benedicks, wealthy owner of Gysinge, a part of Sandviken ironworks. Her brother, Gustaf Benedicks, inherited the iron works and was a member of the Swedish Riksdag. She also had a sister and two half-siblings from her father's second marriage. Her half-brother was physicist Carl Benedicks. There were many artists on her mother's side of the family: several of her uncles and her grandmother were painters, among them Johan Oscar Cantzler and Axel Leopold Cantzler. It was through them that Benedicks' artistry was cultivated and developed. She started at the August Malmström art school for women, and from 20 August 1881 until the spring of 1885, she became the first female student in the sculpture class at the Royal Swedish Academy of Arts.

== France ==
Benedicks met other female artists at the academy including Hilma af Klint and Gerda Rydberg with whom she travelled to France in 1883. Most of their time was spent in Paris and at the Swedish artist colony in Grez-sur-Loing. After completing her studies at the academy in Stockholm, she returned to France where she became the student of sculptor Alexandre Falguière. She also returned to Grez-sur-Loing, where many of the more prominent Scandinavian painters at the time would gather during the 1880s. Benedicks met with artists such as Carl Larsson and his wife Karin Bergöö Larsson, Bruno Liljefors, Christian Krohg and Peder Severin Krøyer. In Grez, the Swedish artists created their own, criticized "salon" called Le Salon des Opposants.

Being a single female, with a good artistic education and coming from a wealthy family who encouraged her artistic aspirations, set Benedicks apart from the rest of the artists in the colony. At the time, this was a predominantly male environment, with artists of small means.

== Works ==
Benedicks was foremost a sculptor, but she also worked with etchings and watercolors. Her sculptures are heavily influenced by the French style of the 1870s and 1880s, while her paintings and etchings are mostly landscapes and animals. Her works were exhibited for the first time at the Salon in Paris in 1899, where she participated with her sculpture L'obsédé. She participated in the Paris Exposition Universelle in 1900, where she was awarded a bronze medal, and later in Vienna.

When making busts, Benedicks worked in marble and bronze. Michel Angelo, a bronze bust, depicts Michelangelo as a thoughtful ordinary man working on something, rather than an exalted genius. She also made busts of P.A. Säve and sculptor Emil Wikström. Her study of the human anatomy resulted in a humoristic sculpture called Séance finie or "The yawning".

Several of Benedicks' sculptures, aquarelles and sketches are still at Brucebo, for example L'obsédé ("The Obsessed"), Baigneur blessé ("The wounded bather") that won the Mention Honorable at the Salon in Paris in 1893.

== Personal life ==
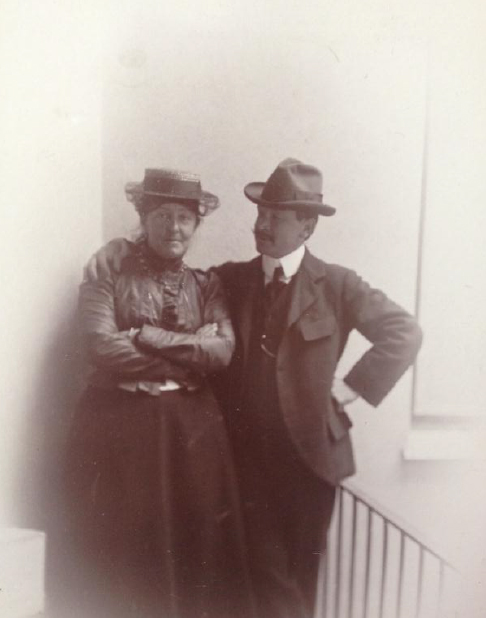
Carolina Benedicks-Bruce and William Blair Bruce

Benedicks met artist William Blair Bruce in France in the spring of 1885. Bruce was still a poor and unknown artist at the time, but a voyage back to Canada in the autumn that year, during which he lost most of his paintings in a shipwreck earned him some notoriety. Benedicks, accompanied by her uncle, made a surprise visit to Canada and Bruce shortly after. Following long discussions, the couple got engaged within a year, against the will of Benedicks' family. They returned to Europe in 1887, where they alternated between Stockholm and Paris. They got married in 1888, and visited Gotland for the first time that year. Theirs was one of many international marriages that came to be as a result of the mixed artist colony in Grez-sur-Loing. Another noted pair was the American painter Francis Brooks Chadwick and Swedish painter Emma Löwstädt-Chadwick. After the marriage the couple moved to Paris, probably to escape the scrutiny of the Benedicks family. For several years they lived a bohemian life and traveled around Europe to paint and study.

== Brucebo ==
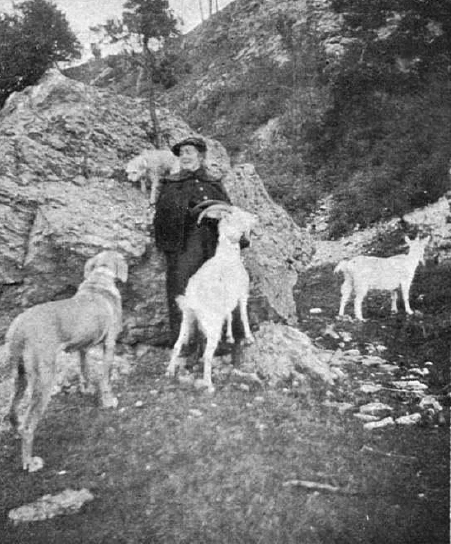
Carolina Benedicks-Bruce with dogs and goats in Brucebo

In 1899, Benedicks-Bruce and her husband decided to settle down on Gotland. They bought properties in Själsö at what was to become Brucebo, north of Visby, and started to rebuild and extend the houses on the estate. Benedicks-Bruce had the money for the project and Bruce was the chief architect. They moved to Brucebo in 1900. When Bruce died in 1906, she stayed on in Brucebo and continued with her work. The estate became a social hub for artists, musicians and scientists on Gotland, with Benedicks-Bruce as a generous hostess. She had three workshops at Brucebo and she also kept a number of animals on the estate, such as cows, horses, sheep, goats, dogs, chickens, parrots, monkeys, that she tended to herself. Her interest in self-sufficiency had started in Grez-sur-Loing, where many of the artists had small gardens where they grew their own vegetables, herbs, fruits and berries. She had great plans for the garden and even brought back seeds from France to plant, as well as hiring a gardener. However, the extension of buildings and other architectural improvements came to a halt with Bruce's death.

She lived at Brucebo until her death on 16 February 1935. She had no children to inherit from her, and in her will she stated that Brucebo should remain a place where young artists could stay and develop their artistry. In 1972, this was realized with the creation of the Brucebo Fine Art Scholarship Foundation.

== Social commitments ==
Benedicks-Bruce was a unique and strong woman, engaged in political and social issues and has been called a Swedish "Mrs. Pankhurst". Among the things she fought for was the women's right to vote. When the Sixth Conference of the International Woman Suffrage Alliance was held in Stockholm in 1911, she invited the delegates to Gotland. About 40 of them from Germany, England, Austria and Hungary accepted and came to Visby on 21 June. She also worked with Gotlandic questions and was one of the most ardent advocates for the preservation of the Burmeisterska huset, a 17th-century house in Visby. She was also a key figure in the establishment of the Swedish Women's Voluntary Defence Organization on Gotland.

In 1911, she was a member of the Väskinde school council and a year later, part of the Väskinde Fruit Growers Association. In 1913, she became a member of the Väskinde Municipality Council. Benedicks-Bruce also made generous donations to the conservation of heritage buildings, childcare and orphanages.

== Gallery ==
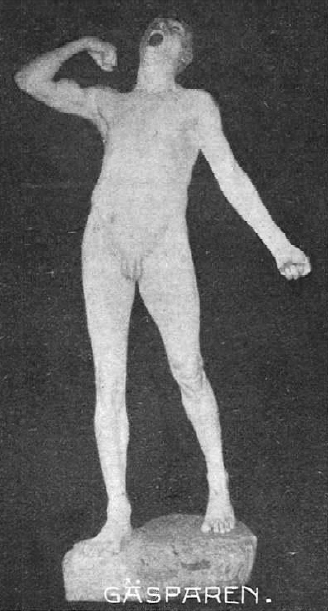
The yawning (Séance finie) by Benedicks-Bruce

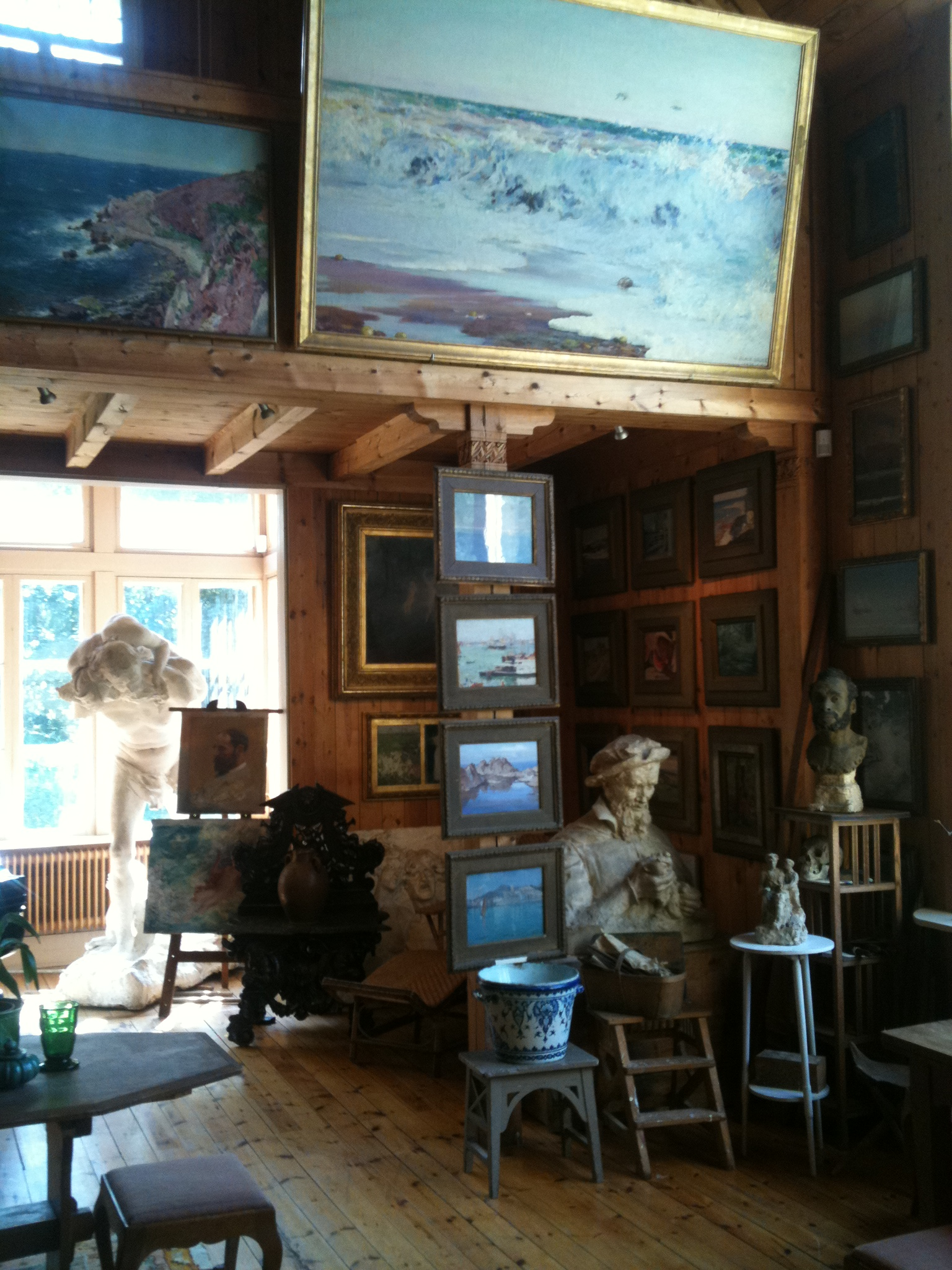
The south part of the studio in Brucebo, Benedicks-Bruce's L'obsède (left, back), Michel Angelo and bust of her husband (right, front)

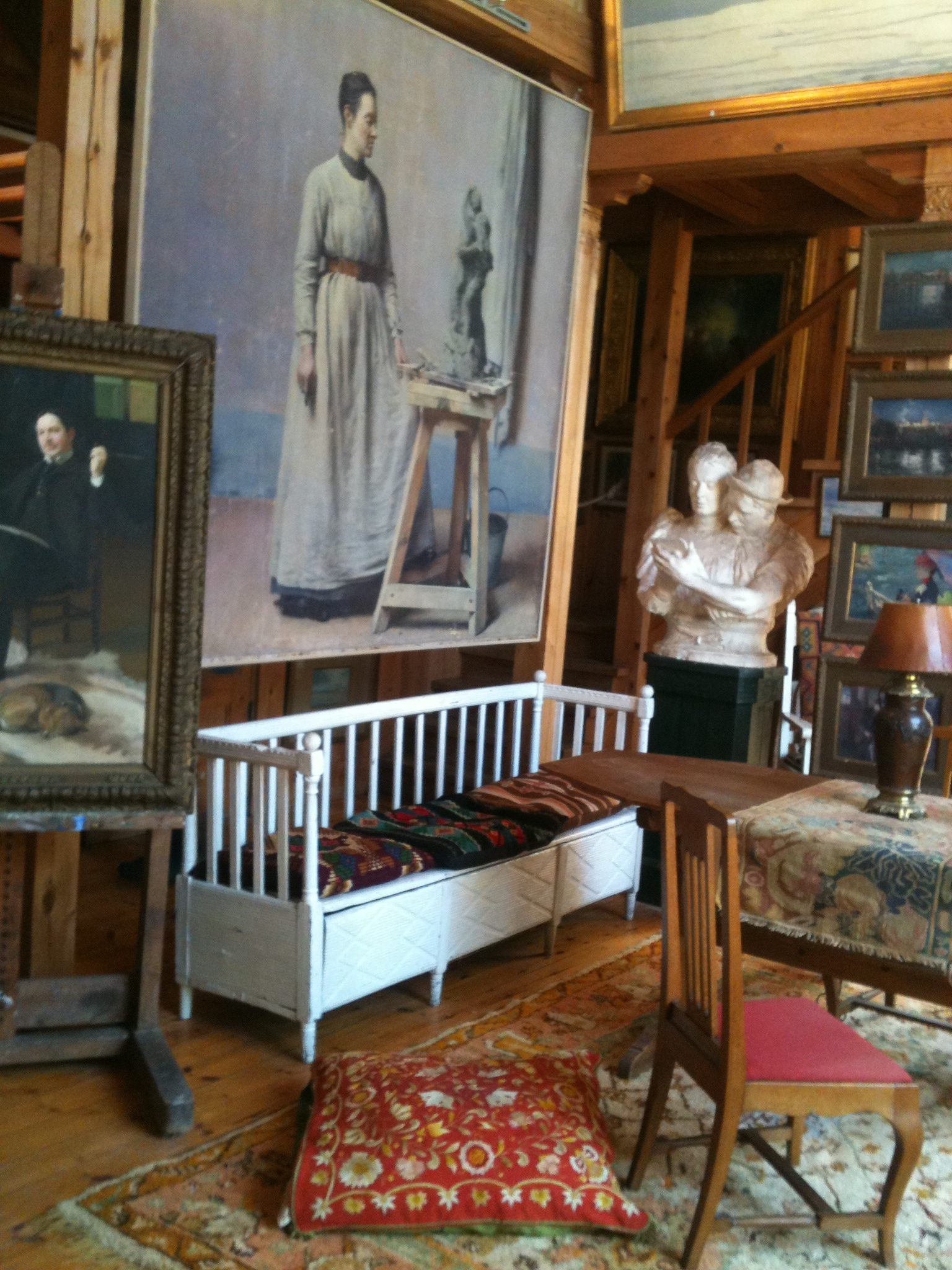
The studio in Brucebo, one of Benedicks-Bruce's sculptures and her husband's full figure portrait of her

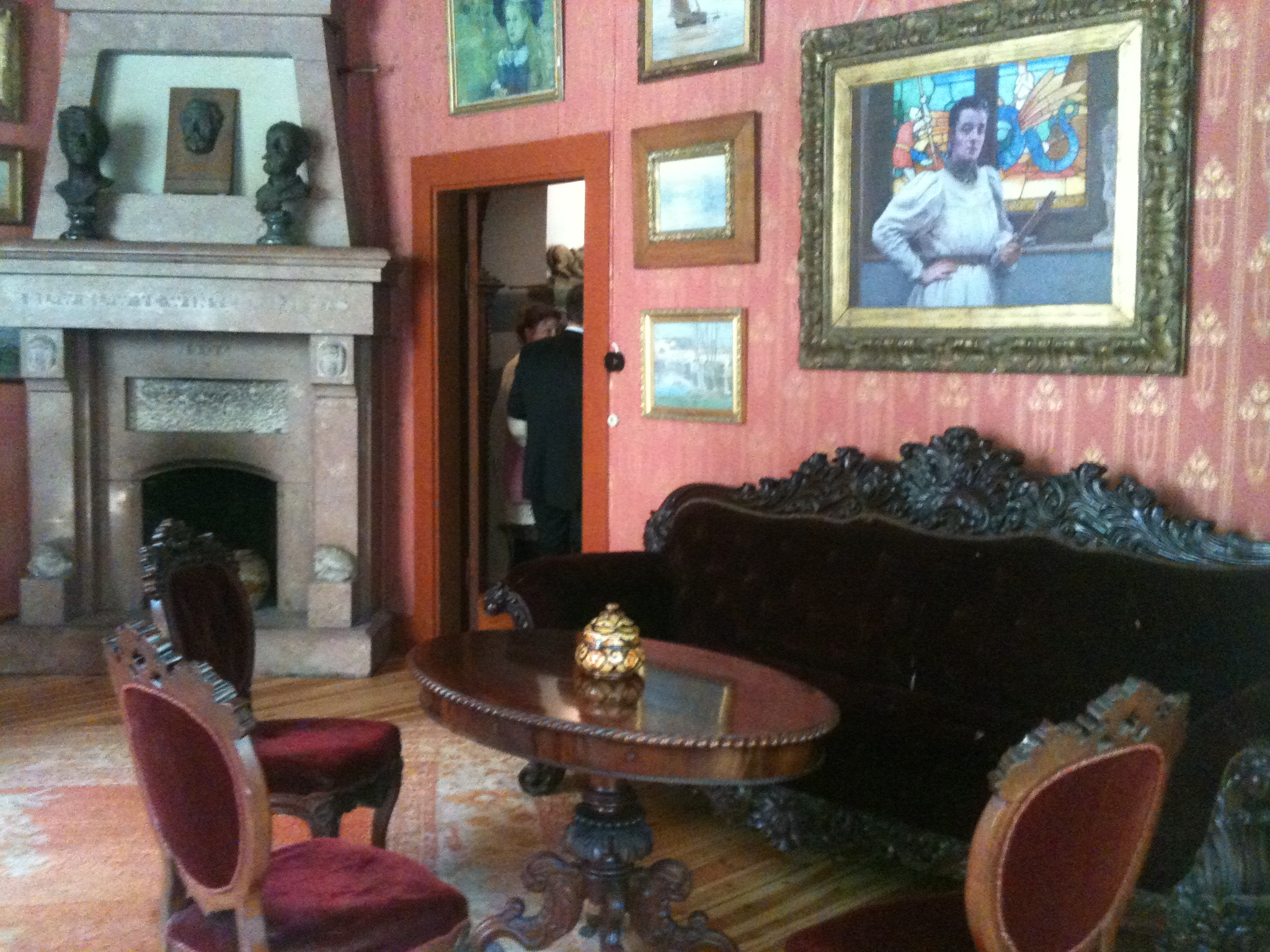
Brucebo artist's home, room with Bruce's portrait of Benedicks-Bruce
