= Louise Gagnon-Arguin =

Louise Gagnon-Arguin is a Canadian archivist.

== Early life ==
Gagnon-Arguin was born in 1941 in Port-Joli, Quebec.

== Education ==
Between 1958 and 1960, she audited librarianship courses at the Université de Montreal. She graduated with her B.A. in history in 1973, and her M.A. in history in 1978, and her PhD in history in 1990, all from Université Laval.

== Professional and scholarly contributions ==
Gagnon-Arguin has worked as a consultant, helping to implement school libraries in La Pocatiere, and working as a librarian at the Séminaire de Trois Rivières. She helped develop a technical program in documentation at Cégep de Jonquiere, and taught there from 1966 to 1971 and from 1973 to 1983. She later taught at Cégep Garneau between 1983 and 1985. Since 1985, she has taught archival science at the School of Library and Information Science at the University of Montreal, achieving the rank of associate professor in 1995. She retired in 2000.

Gagnon-Arguin served on the Canadian Planning Committee on Descriptive Standards (1990-1995). Heavily involved in her professional organization, the Association des Archivistes du Quebec (AAQ), she served as general editor of the association's academic journal Archives from 1982 to 1992, as well as the association's monthly bulletin La Chronique from 2012 to 2015. She has also contributed to the AAQ adopting a code of ethics and a certification program to establish expectations for professional practice.

== Bibliography ==
- Louise Gagnon-Arguin, Sabine Mas, Panorama de l'archivistique contemporaine évolution de la discipline et de la profession : mélanges offerts à Carol Couture, Presses de l'Université du Québec, 2015
- Louise Gagnon-Arguin, Sabine Mas; Dominique Maurel, Les genres de documents dans les organisations : analyse théorique et pratique, Presses de l'Université du Québec, 2015.
- Louise Gagnon-Arguin, Sabine Mas, Typologie des dossiers des organisations: analyse intégrée dans un contexte analogique et numérique, Presses de l'Université du Québec, 2011.
- L'archiviste, constructeur, gardien et communicateur: mélanges en hommage à Jacques Grimard, Presses de l'Université du Québec, 2009.
- Les archives au Québec, des ressources documentaires à découvrir, 2008
- La gestion d'un centre d'archives: mélanges en l'honneur de Robert Garon, Presses de l'Université du Québec, 2003.
- La gestion des archives photographiques, Presses de l'Université du Québec, 2001.
- Typologie des documents des organisations: de la création à la conservation, Presses de l'Université du Québec, 1998
- Cahier d'exercices sur les RDDA. Documentation pédagogique et corrigés, Association des archivistes du Québec, 1994.
- L'archivistique: son histoire, ses acteurs depuis 1960, Presses de l'Université du Québec,1992.
- An introduction to authority control for archivists. Ottawa: Bureau of Canadian Archivists, 1989.
- La Normalisation des descriptions des documents d'archives: l'expérience canadienne (article), Louise Gagnon-Arguin, Carole Saulnier, Louise Garon. Gazette des archives, 1994, 165, p. 253-263.
