= Jean-Paul Gagnon =

Canadian-Australian political theorist

Jean-Paul Gagnon PhD
- Known for: His work in the academic circles in democracy

Academic background
- Education: Queensland University of Technology

Academic work
- Institutions: University of Canberra (2015–present); Australian Catholic University (2013–2015)
- Main interests: Democracy, Public Policy

Jean-Paul Gagnon is a Canadian Australian social and political philosopher, director of the Foundation for the Philosophy of Democracy and a senior lecturer of politics at the University of Canberra. He specialises in the philosophy of democracy and democratic theory.

Gagnon, along with Mark Chou, is co-founder and co-editor in chief, along with Emily Beausoleil, of the Journal Democratic Theory and co-editor of Palgrave's Theories, Concepts and Practices or Democracy series.

He has authored four books, most recently ‘Young People, Citizenship and Political Participation: Combating Civic Deficit?’ and has been published in a number of world leading journals.

== Career ==
Gagnon was awarded the Commonwealth of Australia International Postgraduate in 2007. He received his PhD in Political Science in 2010 at the Queensland University of Technology, Queensland, Australia. In 2011, Gagnon was awarded an Honorary Research Fellowship by the Centre for China Studies. In 2013 he joined the Australian Catholic University, Melbourne, Australia, as a university postdoctoral research fellow in the School of Arts. In 2014, Gagnon and Mark Chou co-founded the journal Democratic Theory, an international peer reviewed academic journal that explores democracy through philosophical and interdisciplinary contributions. Democratic theory is published and distributed by Berghahn.

In 2015, Gagnon became an assistant professor at the University of Canberra, Canberra, Australia, in the School of Government and Policy. He has taught topics such as; democracy, Australian politics, political theory, the politics of China and public policy.

== Books ==
=== Mitigating Democracy and 'A Question on Reason' ===
Published by Macero Dominatus in 2007, ‘Mitigating Democracy and ‘A Question on Reason’ critiques international democratic processes. Gagnon uses a mix of political concepts to offer a practical methods to improve the democratic process.

=== Evolutionary Basic Democracy: A Critical Overture ===
Published by Palgraves Macmillan in 2013 and nominated for the 2013 Stein Rokkan Prize, ‘Evolutionary Basic Democracy: A Critical Overture’ argues the need for an understanding of democracy for the entire planet and all of humanity. Gagnon draws on the concept of non-human and human democracies in all forms to argues that democracy in itself is evolutionary and constantly fluctuating and mutating. He claims that we have no true understanding of democracy, which leads to significant political troubles. In ‘Evolutional Basic Democracy: A Critical Overture,’ Gagnon argues that democracy exists, to some extent, in every life-form.

=== Democratic Theorists in Conversation: Turns in Contemporary Thought ===
Published by Palgrave Macmillan in 2013,‘Democratic Theorist in Conversation: Turns in Contemporary Thought’ includes works on ‘new democratic theory’ by Ulrich Beck, Noam Chomsky, John Dryzek, John Dunn, Francis Fukuyama, David Held, John Keane, Pierre Rosenvallon, Thomas Seeley and Albert Weale. Gagnon leads contributors through conversations on democracy to initiate discussion about a ‘new democracy theory.’ He argues that changing methods of research have decolonised the discourse surrounding democracy, therefore claiming the existence of a ‘new democratic theory.’

=== Young People, Citizenship and Political Participation: Combatting Civil Deficit? ===
Co-authored with Mark Chou, Catherine Hartung and Lesley Pruitt and published by Rowman & Littlefield International in 2017, ‘Young Peoples, Citizenship and Political Participation: Combatting Civil Deficit?’ challenges the popular idea that young people are disengaged from politics and democratic participation. Rather, it explores how young people work with and against contemporary politics at an institutional and grassroots level. The authors suggest co-designing civics education programmes with a diverse representation of young people in order to engage them in all levels of the democratic process. They suggest these programmes have the potential to turn young people from citizens in the making to full citizens.

== H-Index ==
Jean-Paul has a h-index of 12.
