= William Blair Bruce =

Canadian painter (1859–1906)

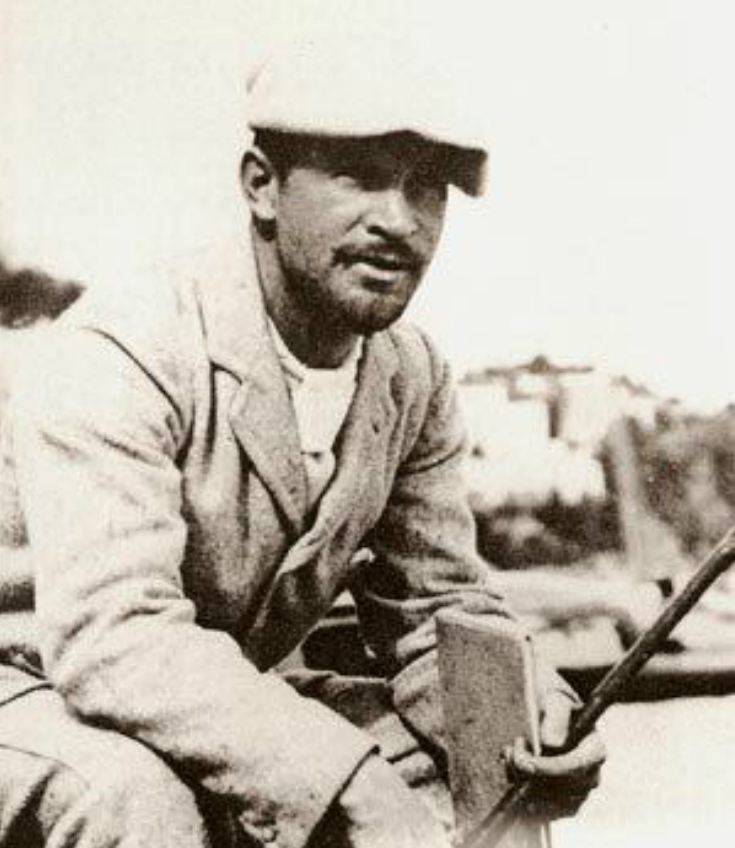
- Born: October 8, 1859; Hamilton, Canada West
- Died: November 17, 1906 (aged 47); Stockholm, Sweden
- Known for: Brucebo, his home in Sweden
- Notable work: The Phantom Hunter
- Style: Impressionism
- Spouse: Carolina Benedicks-Bruce
- Website: www.brucebo.se

William Blair Bruce (8 October 1859 – 17 November 1906) was a Canadian painter. He studied in France and became one of Canada's first impressionist painters. He lived most of his life in France and on the island of Gotland, Sweden, where he and his Swedish wife Carolina Benedicks-Bruce created the artists estate Brucebo, which was later established as a nature reserve.

== Biography ==
=== Early years ===
William Blair Bruce was born on 8 October 1859, in Hamilton, Canada West, where he grew up in Corktown and on the Mountain. A plaque in Bruce Park, Hamilton marks the site of his childhood home. He was the son of William Bruce, born 1833 in Scotland, who emigrated to Hamilton with his wife Janet Blair in 1837. Initially Bruce studied law at Hamilton Collegiate Institute, but had his mind set on becoming an architect, and studied for a while at the Mechanics Institute in Hamilton, in 1877. He worked for an architectural firm for the ensuing two years. Members of his family were both musically and artistically inclined and noticed Bruce's talent at an early age. In 1881, they sent him to Paris to study, a journey that extended over the years. He would only return to Canada on two short occasions.

=== Paris ===
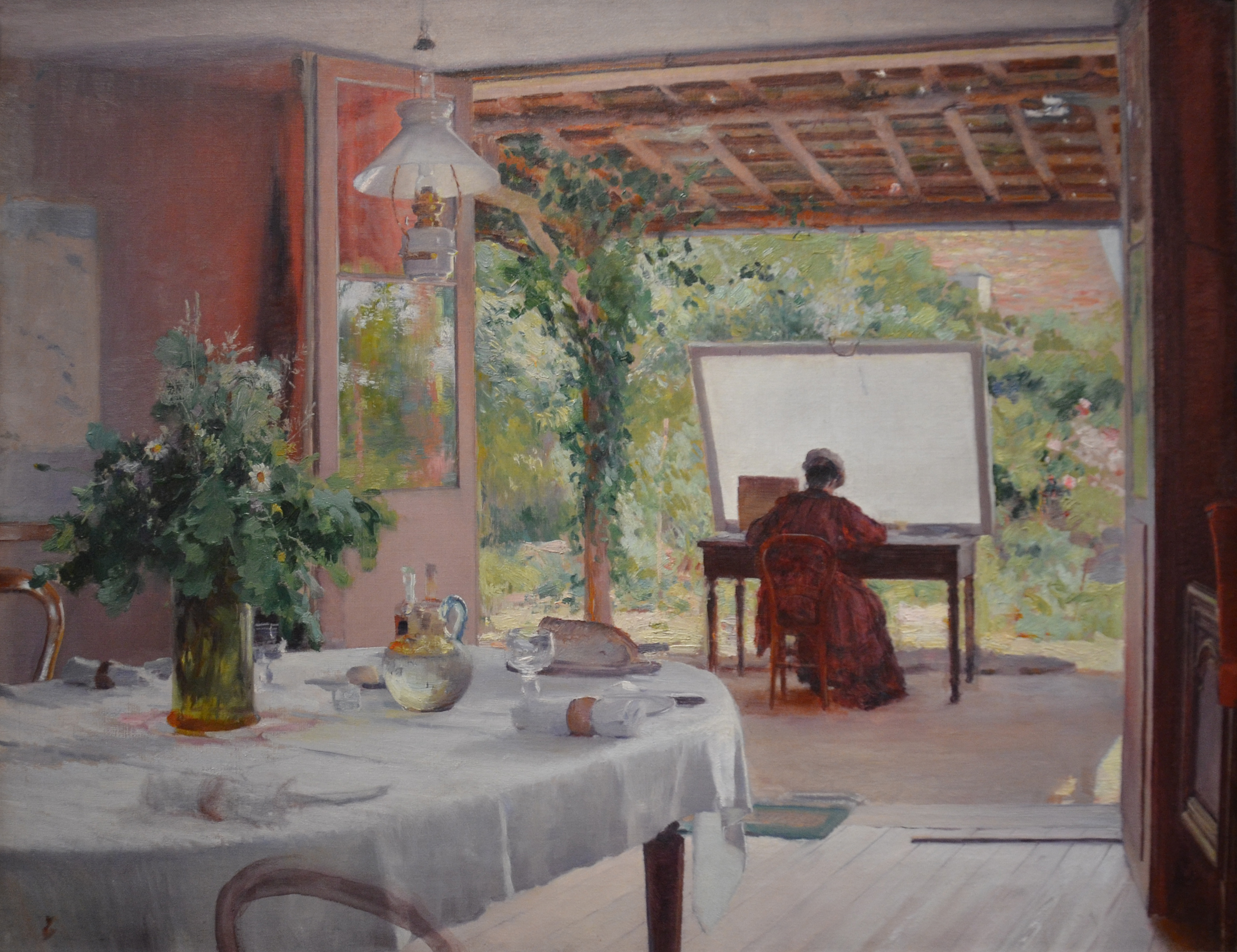
Open air studio, 1885–90

In Paris his classical education at Académie Julian included genre scenes and several other subjects. Like other artists of the time he wanted to experience the Parisian art scene and join in the competition to exhibit at the annual Salon in Paris. He also traveled to the artist colony in Barbizon where he and a group of artist friends rented a cottage in 1882, and Grez-sur-Loing where a new generation of Swedish artists, such as Carl Larsson, his wife Karin Bergöö, Bruno Liljefors and August Strindberg had formed a colony. He became acquainted with Impressionism and en plein air or "outdoors painting", a style which he came to prefer. He also became one of Canada's first impressionist painters. Taking advice from Louis Welden Hawkins, an English painter who met Bruce in Paris and who in the spring of 1882 gave him guidance on Paris Salon, telling him to make his work large and of a sentimental nature. His Temps Passé was exhibited at the 1884 Salon although despite this success he remained in financial difficulties. Bruce subsequently suffered a nervous breakdown and hastily returned to Canada for the first time. To compound his problems, the steamship Brooklyn, carrying about 200 of his works, sank outside Anticosti Island in the Gulf of Saint Lawrence on 8 November 1885.

In the summer of 1885, Bruce had met the Swedish sculptor Carolina Benedicks in France. They fell in love and when Bruce returned to Canada, she made a surprise visit accompanied by her brother Gustaf, to persuade him to return to Paris. They were engaged in the autumn of 1886, and returned to Europe in 1887.

== Return to Europe ==
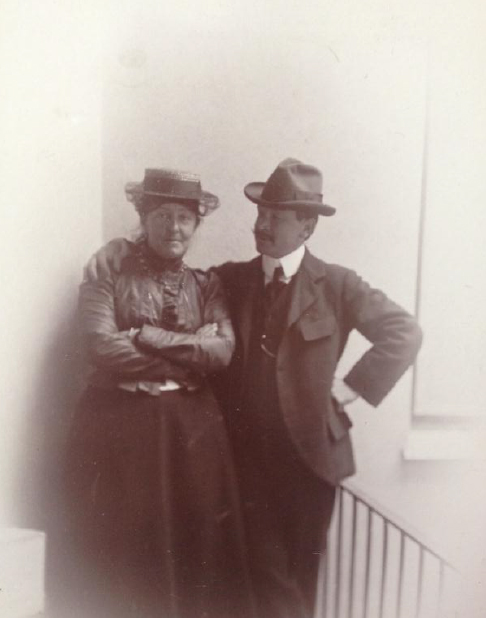
Carolina Benedicks-Bruce and William Blair Bruce

Bruce returned to France a bolder artist. In 1887, he and a group of fellow artists such as the American painter Theodore Robinson, travelled to Giverny where they shared a house and, influenced by Monet who lived nearby, painted a number of impressive impressionist sketches, using a brighter palette and with a heightened sensitivity to incorporating light. In Giverny, Robinson and Bruce seem to have painted side by side, and Bruce may have influenced Robinson.

In 1888, on Bruce's return to Paris, he painted The Phantom Hunter, which became an instant success at the Salon and marked the peak of his career. He and Benedicks married at the British embassy in Stockholm on 4 December the same year. She provided energy and stability for Bruce throughout his life and also became his favorite model.

In May 1889, the couple returned to Grez and Bruce wrote to his mother that "Grèz [sic] is a great improvement on Barbizon, quite a different country in fact". A month later, Bruce also sold some paintings to the American artist Walter Gay, who was visiting Grez at the time. Bruce and Benedicks-Bruce continued to make annual visits to Grez up until 1894. They rented a small house, which had previously been the home of Carl Larsson and his wife Karin. It was here that Bruce painted his Open Air Studio (now in the National Museum of Fine Arts, Stockholm). It is a view from their home in Grez, in which he pictured Benedicks-Bruce doing an etching out-doors behind a sun screen. He also painted The Smiths (1894, National Gallery of Canada, Ottawa) at Grez, beginning with preparatory studies in 1893. In 1895, the couple made a brief journey to Hamilton in Canada, where Bruce painted on the Six Nations Reserve. Throughout the 1890s, they led a bohemian life, travelling to Capri, Italy and Sweden where they took a liking to Gotland and its light.

In 1900–06, the couple created a summer home called Brucebo (Swedish for: "The house where Bruce lives") on Gotland. Here, Bruce painted, did some amateur archaeology and socialized with the locals, while Benedicks-Bruce worked with sculptures and etchings as well as tending the garden and the many animals she had gathered at Brucebo.

Bruce died suddenly on 17 November 1906 in Stockholm at the age of 47, and Benedicks-Bruce settled down permanently at Brucebo. After Bruce's death, a commemorative exhibition of 122 of his works was held in Paris in 1907. Carolina donated 29 of his paintings to the City of Hamilton. This donation became the foundation of the Art Gallery of Hamilton that opened in 1914. Even though Bruce enjoyed a good reputation towards the end of his life with 15 participations at the Salon, exhibitions in London, Toronto, Stockholm, Buffalo and came to influence many young artists in Canada, he remains as of 2015 relatively unknown. A large part of his production can be seen at Brucebo, which is now a museum managed by the Brucebo Foundation.

Benedicks-Bruce lived at Brucebo until her death on 16 February 1935.

== Brucebo ==
Originally used as a summer house by Bruce and his wife, they rebuilt and extended Brucebo in 1900–06 into their permanent home and studio. In 2009, the estate was converted into an art museum. In connection with this, a shooting occurred at the main house. The museum and the estate are managed by the Brucebo Foundation. The foundation also grants scholarship to younger Canadian artists. In 1970, the 35 ha (0.35 km^{2}) Brucebo estate was established as a nature reserve.

== Gallery ==
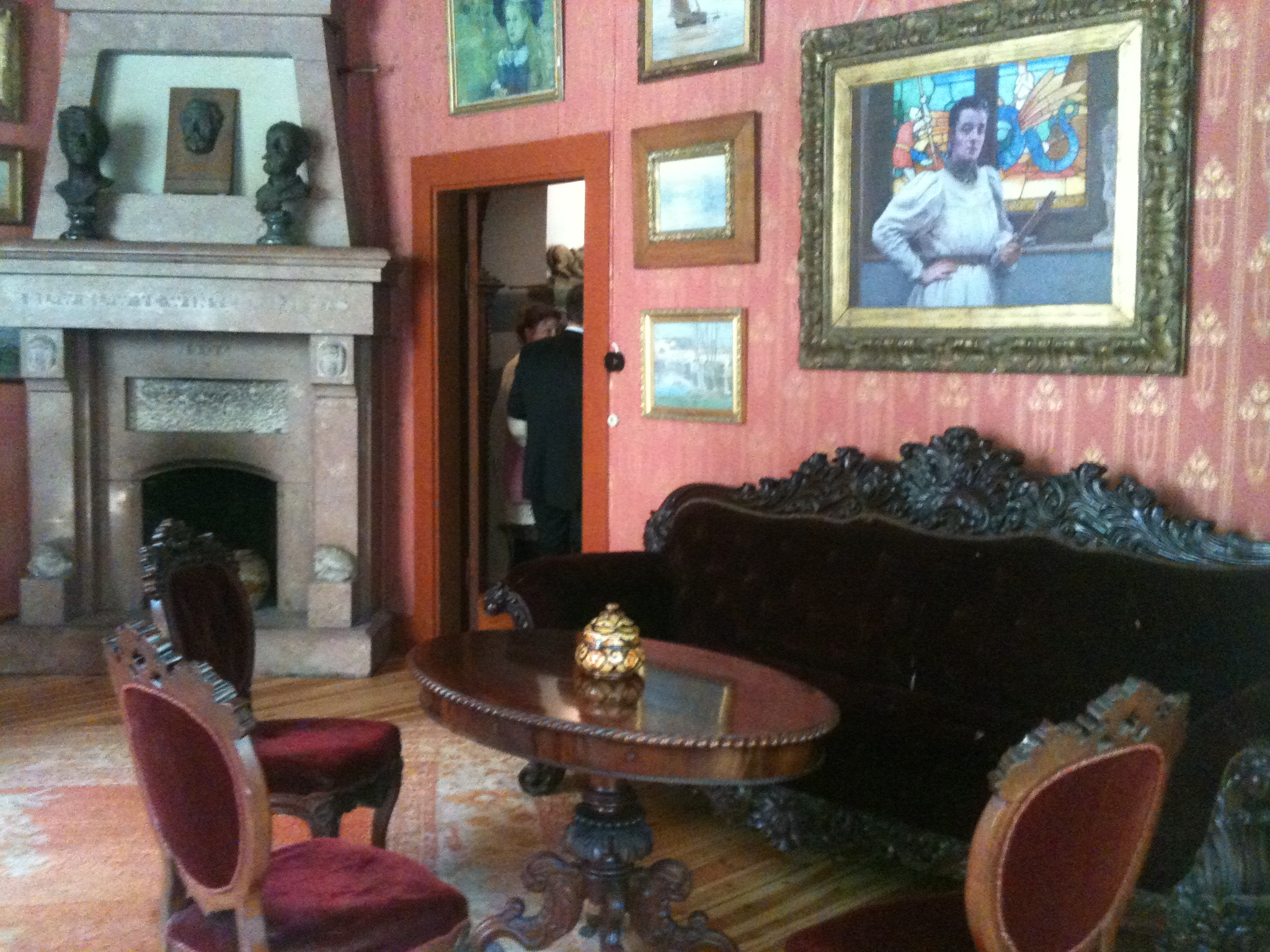
Brucebo artist's home, room with Bruce's portrait of his wife

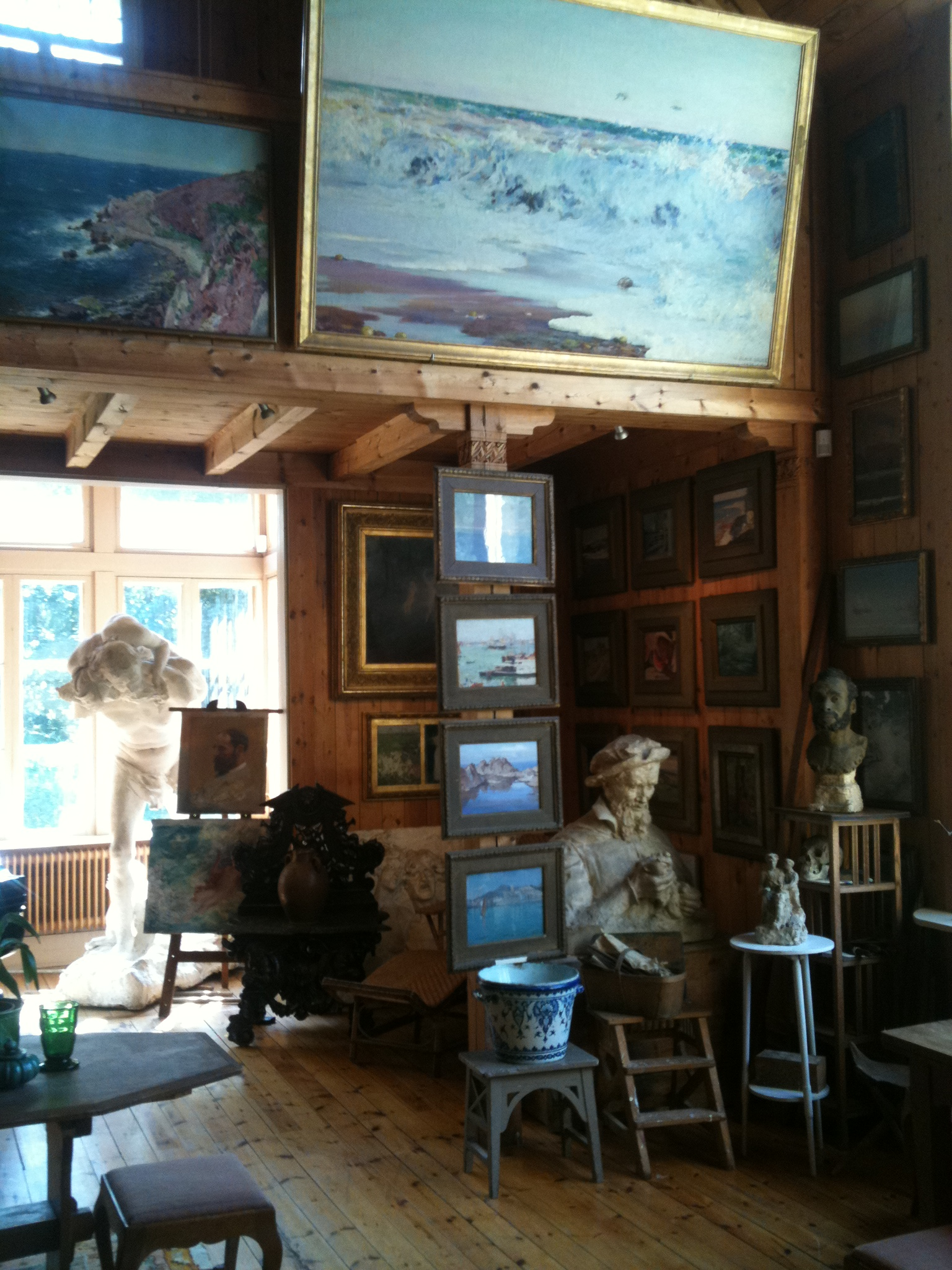
The south part of the studio in Brucebo, Benedicks-Bruce's L'obsède (left, back), Michel Angelo and bust of Bruce (right, front)

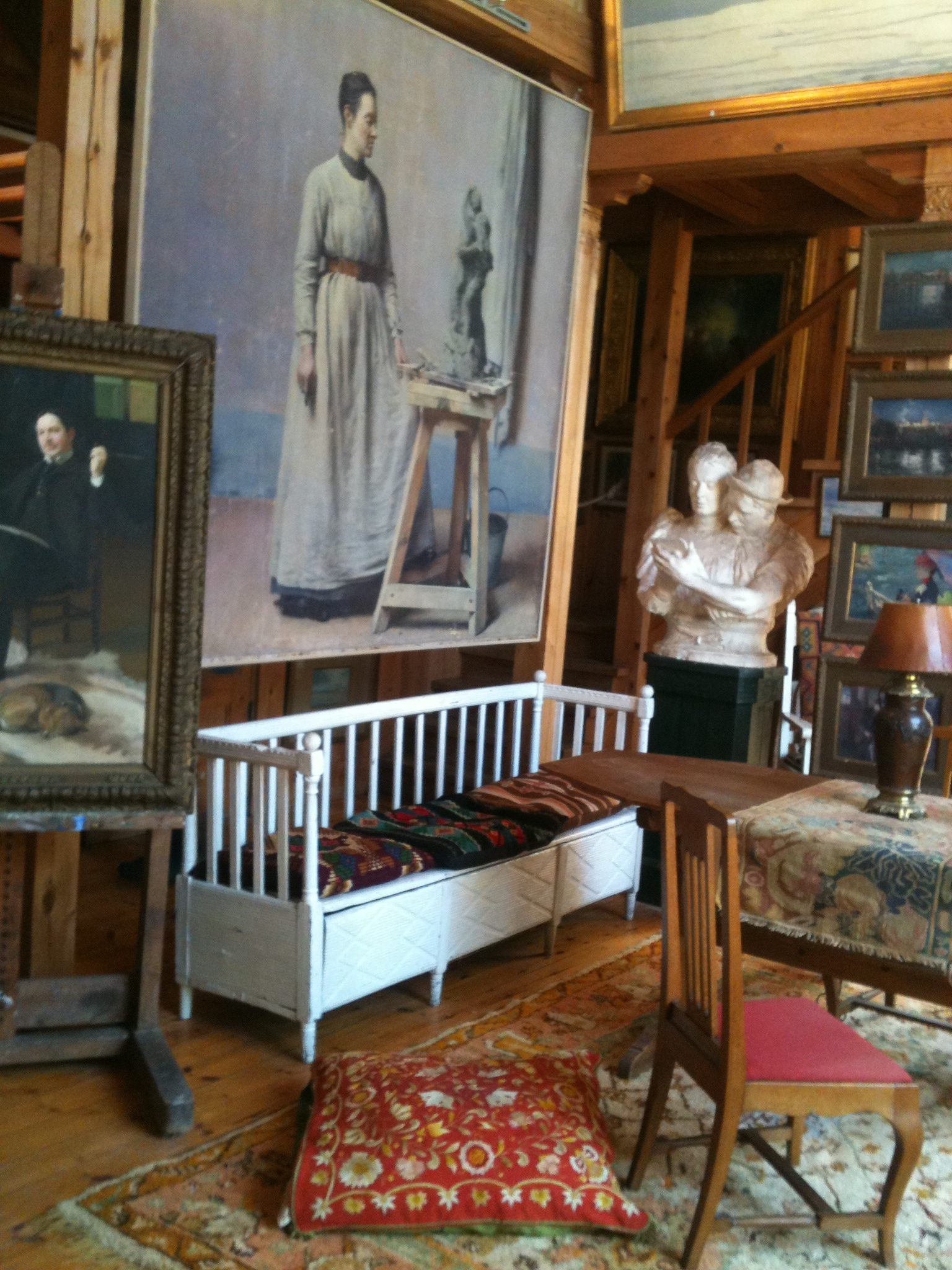
The studio in Brucebo, Bruce's self portrait (left) and full figure portrait of his wife

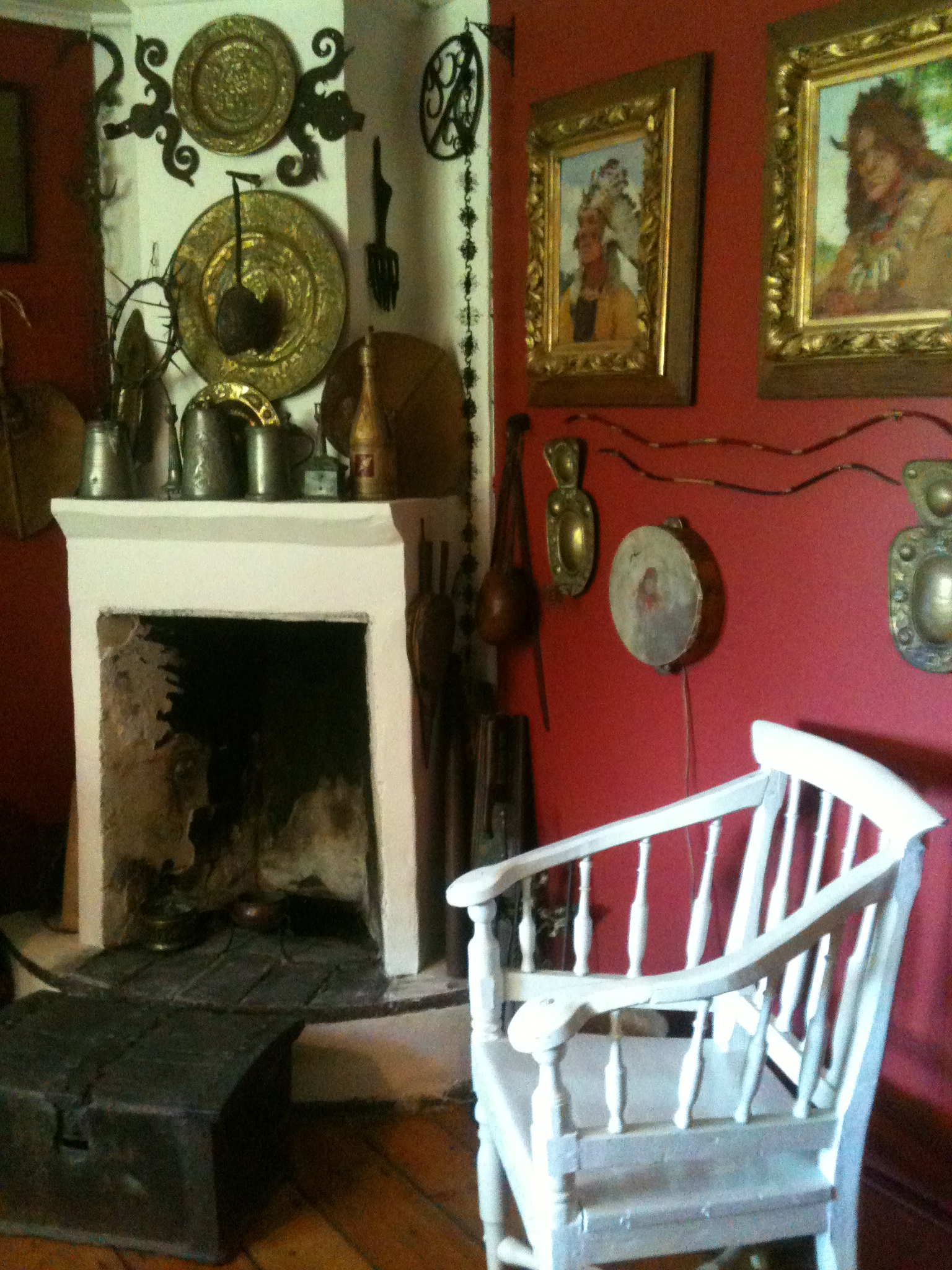
The "Indian room" at Brucebo with paintings from the Six Nations Reserve

== Record sale prices ==
At the June 8, 2023 Cowley Abbott Auction Artwork from an Important Private Collection - Part II, Picking Pears in Barbizon (The Pear Orchard) (1882) oil on canvas, 29.5 x 59 ins ( 74.9 x 149.9 cms ), Auction Estimate: $70,000.00 - $90,000.00, realized a price of $264,000.00.
