= Paul Gagnon =

Paul Gagnon may refer to:

- Paul Gagnon (politician) (born 1937), member of the House of Commons of Canada
- Paul A. Gagnon (1925–2005), historian and educator
- Paul M. Gagnon, American attorney

== See also ==
- Paul-Edmond Gagnon (1909–1981), member of the House of Commons of Canada
