= Ferdinand Gagnon =

American journalist

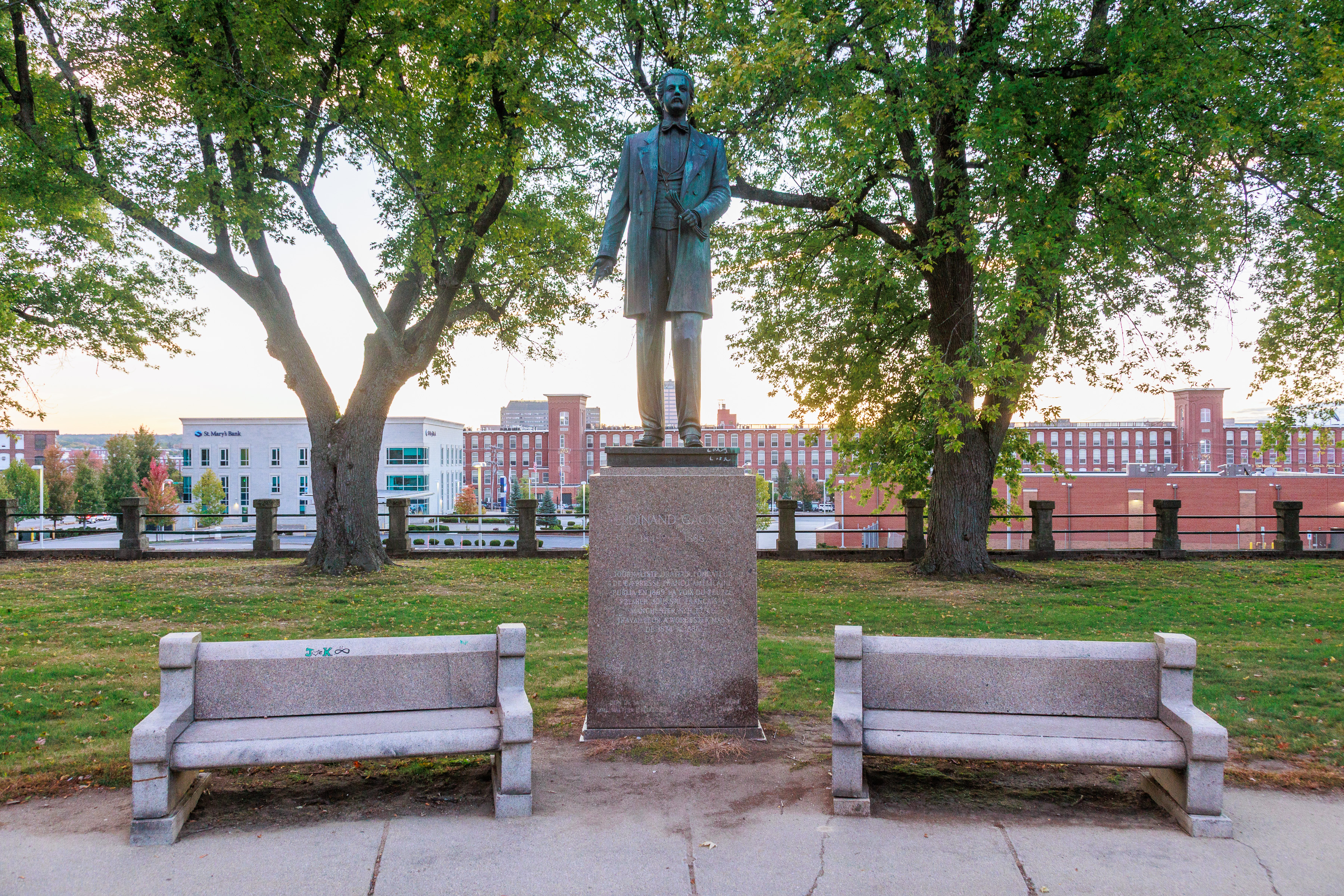
A statue of Ferdinand Gagnon stands in Manchester's Lafayette Park

Ferdinand Gagnon (8 June 1849 – 15 April 1886) was a Canadian born American journalist.

Gagnon was born and educated in Saint-Hyacinthe, Canada East. At age 19, he joined a substantial group of French Canadians who were leaving the Province of Quebec for the New England states to escape British rule. He began his American residency at Manchester, New Hampshire.

Gagnon envisaged a national union of French Canadians, whether in Canada or the United States. He saw the union as something that would happen sooner or later and worked toward that goal. He put forth a concerted effort for a period of time toward repatriation of French-Americans to Quebec. The effort was largely unsuccessful.

His vocation was publishing and journalism, and he was involved in a number of publications, starting with La Voix du peuple. That publication ceased and was replaced by L’Idée nouvelle. In 1869 Gagnon married and settled in Worcester, Massachusetts, where he started the L’Étendard national.

Gagnon continued to support his view of the French Canadian émigrés but was not always popular with the émigrés themselves. His early death at age 36 ended his involvement of the diverse cause.

There is a statue of Gagnon in Lafayette Park, in Manchester, New Hampshire.
