= Jean Gagnon =

Jean Gagnon may refer to:

- Jean Gagnon (bishop) (1941–2016), Canadian Roman Catholic bishop
- Jean Gagnon (curler) (born 1970), Canadian curler
- Jean Gagnon (ice hockey) (born 1956), Canadian ice hockey player
- Johnny Gagnon (Jean Joseph "Black Cat" Gagnon, 1905–1984), Canadian ice hockey player
