= Lucien Gagnon =

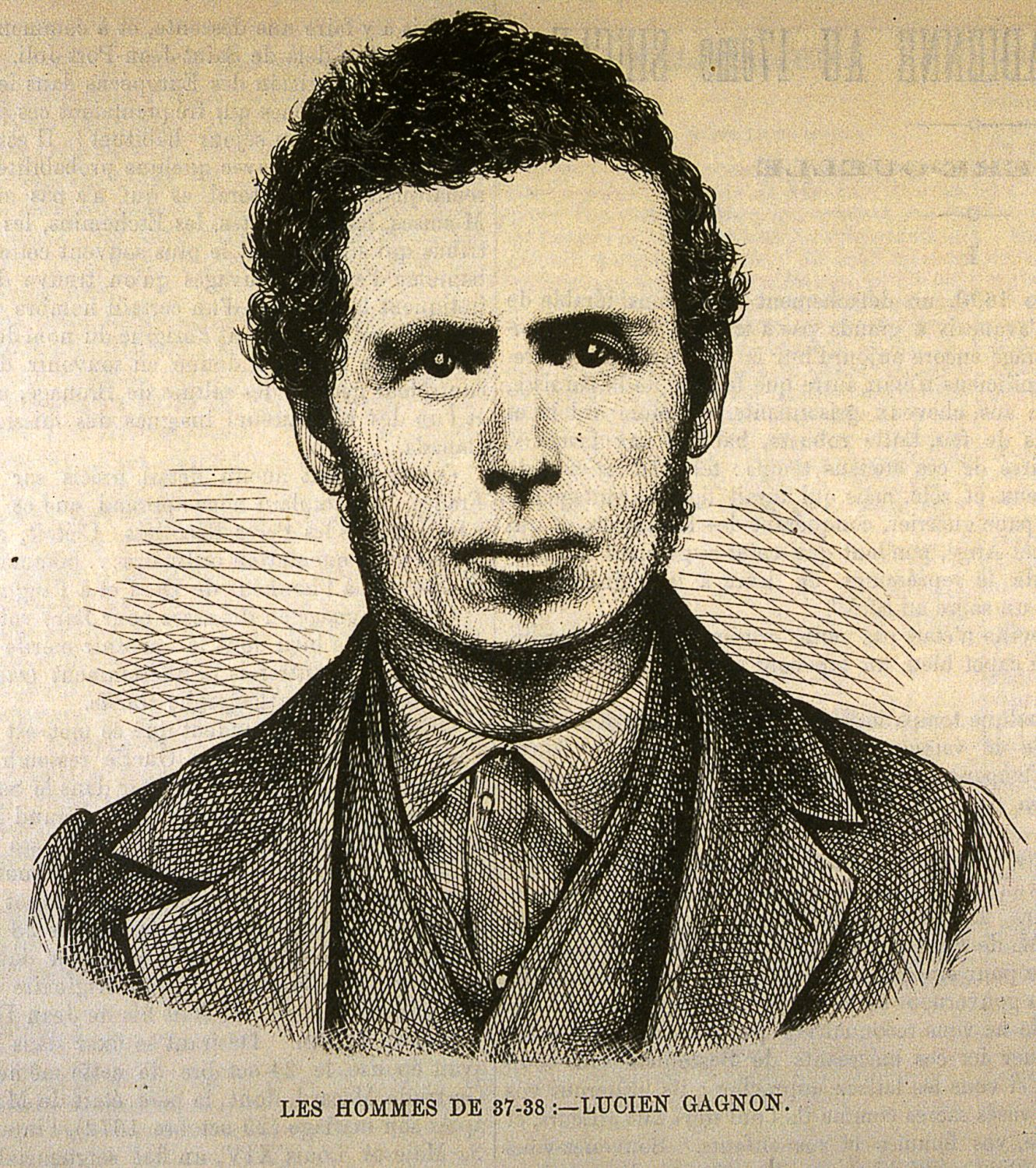
Lucien Gagnon

Lucien Gagnon (8 January 1793 – 7 January 1843) was a farmer who fought in the Lower Canada Rebellion.

== Biography ==
Gagnon was born in La Prairie, Quebec. He was among the first to take part in the agitation in Canada against the British government, was present at the assembly of the six confederate counties at St. Charles, 23 October 1837, and left the meeting convinced that insurrection was the only remedy for Canadian grievances. He then traveled through every part of the parish of St. Valentine and the neighboring parishes, preparing the people for the struggle.

After being defeated at St. Charles, the chiefs of the insurrection, who had fled to the United States, decided, after reaching Swanton, to return to Canada. They were convinced that Robert Nelson was waiting for them at St. Cesaire at the head of a considerable force. As they were not numerous enough to venture on such an incursion, Gagnon offered to go to Canada and return with a sufficient number to give the enterprise a chance of success. He crossed the frontier during the night, raised his native parish, as well as the surrounding ones, and succeeded in organizing a band of 50 determined men with whom he managed to recross the frontier, although it was well guarded. The band entered Swanton, where it was received with enthusiasm by the refugees and by the Americans who at this point did everything to help the insurgents.

Between 70 and 80 men passed into Canada, but, on their way to join Nelson, they met 400 volunteers who were waiting for them at Moore's Corner. In the fight that ensued, Gagnon was twice wounded, and escaped across the frontier with great difficulty. He was soon afterward joined by his wife, her mother, and his eight children, who had been driven, almost naked, from their home under circumstances of great barbarity.

On 28 February, Gagnon attempted to enter Canada with a band of 300 men which had been organized by Nelson. They were arrested at the frontier by U. S. troops, and tried for violating the neutrality laws, but, as they were without arms, they were acquitted. Gagnon afterward entered Canada and was charged by Nelson with the duty of keeping up free communication between Rouse's Point and Napierville. He was present at the fight at Odelltown, 10 November 1838, and succeeded in reaching the United States afterward. The privations that he had endured caused consumption, which ultimately ended his life; he died at Champlain, New York.
