= Madame Gagné =

Canadian photographer

Georgiana (Eugenie) Gagné
- Other name: Madame Gagné
- Occupation: Photographer
- Years active: 1886–1891
- Known for: Portraits

Madame Gagné was a photographer who worked between 1886 and 1891 in Montreal, Quebec, Canada. She and her husband, Édouard C. Gagné (also a photographer) had a total of three studios over time. At least one of her prints can be found at Montreal's McCord Museum.

Madame Gagné reportedly had a rapport with the new Chinese immigrants to Montreal, and often made portraits of them and their families. Since most photographers of the time catered to more well-to-do clients, this was an unusual custom.

Her photography studio was located at 211 Saint Laurent Boulevard, which is in the heart of today's Old Montreal.

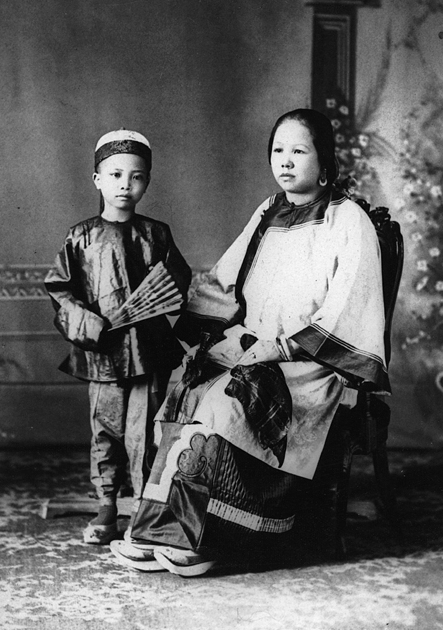
Mrs Wing Sing and son, Montreal c.1890, by Madame Gagné
