= Society of Northern Alberta Print-Artists =

Coordinates: 53.5496°N 113.5198°W

The Society of Northern Alberta Print-Artists (SNAP) is a non-profit, artist run centre dedicated to print making.

SNAP was founded in 1982 as an independent, cooperatively-run fine art printshop in the Great West Saddlery Building, located in central Edmonton. In 1996 they opened a gallery. SNAP is a member organization of the Alberta Association of Artist-run Centres (AAARC). SNAP publishes SNAPline, which includes "diverse examples of fine art printmaking" 3 times a year, and has attracted attention by local, national, and international artists. The University of Alberta Library has the full run of SNAPLine from 2002 to present. SNAP will move to an expanded space on 115th Street in the Queen Mary Park Neighbourhood in spring 2020.
