= Jacqueline Gagne =

American golfer

Jacqueline Gagne is an American golfer from Rancho Mirage, California.

In 2007, at 46 years old and despite having played golf for only five years, Gagne claimed to have hit seven holes in one in one year. Her story gained national headlines, including on ESPN.

Dean Knuth, creator of the U.S. Golf Association's Slope Rating System and a Golf Digest contributor, said Gagne's achievement was "impossible". Analyst David Boyum said the odds of Gagne's feat are "1 in 2,253,649,101,066,840,000,000,000,000,000,000,000."

As 2007 progressed, the number of holes in one she claimed to have hit continued to grow. USA Today reported her number of aces that year to be up to ten, including one that was banked off a tree. The same article reported that her feat earned her a guest appearance on the Late Show with David Letterman. Then in June 2007, the Wall Street Journal reported the number of holes in one was up to fourteen. She also made an appearance on The Today Show.

In October 2007, when her claim had reached seventeen holes in one, a Golf Digest journalist investigated her claims and cast doubt on her accomplishments.
