= Yechel Gagnon =

Yechel Gagnon (born 1973) is a Canadian mixed media artist. She is known for her signature style of carved plywood bas reliefs. She creates large scale public art projects and exhibits nationally and internationally.

Born in Montreal, Quebec, Gagnon received a Master of Fine Arts at Concordia University in Montreal and also studied at the Ontario College of Art and Design (OCAD University) in Toronto.

Her works have been exhibited in more than twenty solo exhibitions and over fifty group shows in commercial galleries, artist-run centres and museums across Canada, in the United States and France, including an exhibition at the McMaster Museum of Art in 2004. Her major public artworks include commissions from the Bishop's University, Théâtre La Licorne (Montreal), College Jean-de-Brebeuf and the University of Montreal, among others. Her works are represented in public, corporate and private collections and widely collected. She has received grants from the Canada Council for the Arts and Conseil des arts et des lettres du Québec.

In 2019, Yechel Gagnon received the Créatrice de l'année en Montérégie Award given by 'Conseil des arts et des lettres du Québec'.

Yechel Gagnon lives in Montreal.

== Sources ==
- Yechel Gagnon : Palimpsest, 2004, McMaster Museum of Art, 64 pages, 23 colour reproductions, 10.5 x 8 inches, softcover. Includes bibliographical references. ISBN 1-894088-50-6
- Yechel Gagnon, 2002, 32 pages, 20 colour reproductions. 9.5 x 6.5 inches, softcover. ISBN 2-921822-23-7
