= Koh-Lanta: La Revanche des Héros =

- No. of days: 23
- No. of castaways: 16
- Winner: Bertrand Bolle
- Runner-up: Claude Dartois
- Location: Koh Rong, Cambodia
- No. of episodes: 9

Release
- Original release: 6 April – 1 June 2012

Season chronology
- ← Previous; Raja Ampat Next → Malaisie

Koh-Lanta: La Revanche des Héros (in English The Revenge of the Heroes) is the 3rd special season of the French version of Survivor, Koh-Lanta. This season takes place in Cambodia on the island of Koh Rong, and was broadcast on TF1 in April 2012, every Friday at 8:45pm (7:45 p.m. GMT).

This season includes contestants of old season of Koh-Lanta who had not won. This season survival conditions are harder: they begin the game without rice, they can't win the fire (they have to make it) and one of the immunity challenges is a playoff.

== Finishing order ==
Contestant	Original tribe	Merged tribe	Finish
Fabienne Lefebvre-Trehoux; 47, Le Rouret; Palau	Nekmao		Lost Challenge; Day 2
Marine Plissonneau; 37, Vincennes; Vietnam	Nekmao		1st Voted Out; Day 3
Nicolas Roy †; 40, Bressuire; Nicoya	Nekmao		2nd Voted Out; Day 6
Isabelle Da Silva; 38, Houilles; Palau	Klahan		3rd Voted Out; Day 8
Patricia Morel; 37, Cahors; Raja Ampat	Klahan		Lost Duel; 1st jury member Day 10
Francis Bordas; 66, Périgueux; Pacific	Klahan	Koh-Lanta	4th Voted Out; 2nd jury member Day 11
Freddy Boucher; 27, Lille; Palau & Le Choc des Héros	Klahan	Koh-Lanta	5th Voted Out; 3rd jury member Day 14
Wafa El Mejjad; 28, Toulouse; Vietnam	Klahan	Koh-Lanta	6th Voted Out; 4th jury member Day 16
Teheiura Teahui; 33, Cazouls-lès-Béziers; Raja Ampat	Nekmao	Koh-Lanta	7th Voted Out; 5th jury member Day 19
Moussa Niangane; 30, Bagneux; Bocas del Toro	Klahan	Koh-Lanta	Lost Challenge; 6th jury member Day 21
Guénaelle Biras; 36, Paris; Les Aventuriers de Koh-Lanta	Nekmao	Koh-Lanta	8th Voted Out; 7th jury member Day 21
Patrick Merle; 42, Saint-Symphorien-de-Lay; Palau	Nekmao	Koh-Lanta	Lost Challenge; 8th jury member Day 22
Coumba Baradji; 29, Nanterre; Pacific & Le Choc des Héros	Nekmao	Koh-Lanta	Lost Challenge; 9th jury member Day 22
Maud Garnier; 35, Clichy; Nicoya	Klahan	Koh-Lanta	9th Voted Out; 10th jury member Day 23
Claude Dartois; 32, Paris; Vietnam	Nekmao	Koh-Lanta	Runner-up; Day 23
Bertrand Bolle; 36, Metz; Caramoan	Klahan	Koh-Lanta	Sole Survivor; Day 23

== Future appearances ==
Isabelle Da Silva, Freddy Boucher and Teheiura Teahui returned for Koh-Lanta: La Nouvelle Édition. Teahui returned once again alongside Claude Dartois and Moussa Niangane for Koh-Lanta: L'Île des héros. Boucher returned alongside Teahui, Patrick Merle, Coumba Baradji, and Dartois to compete in Koh-Lanta: La Légende.

== Challenges ==
Episode	Broadcast date	Challenge winner	
Episode	Broadcast date	Initial Challenge	
Episode 1	April 6, 2012	Freddy	
		Reward	Immunity
Episode 1	April 6, 2012	/	Klahan
Episode 2	April 13, 2012	Nekmao	Klahan
Episode 3	April 20, 2012	Nekmao	Nekmao
Episode 4	April 27, 2012	Nekmao	Freddy
Episode 5	May 4, 2012	Coumba & Bertrand	Bertrand
Episode 6	May 11, 2012	Claude	Teheiura
Episode 7	May 18, 2012	Teheiura	Claude
Episode 8	May 25, 2012	Claude	Bertrand
		Treasure Hunt	Final Challenge
Episode 9	June 1, 2012	Maud	Claude

== Elimination table ==
	Original tribe				Merged tribe											
Episode :	1		2	3	4		5	6	7	8		9			second	winner
Eliminated :	Fabienne	Marine	Nicolas	Isabelle	Patricia	Francis	Freddy	Wafa	Teheiura	Moussa	Guénaëlle	Patrick	Coumba	Maud	Claude	Bertrand
Votes :	0 (Note: Playoff challenge)	4/7	4/7	5/8	0 (Note: Merged duel)	6/13	6/11	6/10	5/9	0 (Note: Playoff challenge)	4/7	0	0	1	1/10	9/10
Candidats	Votes															
Bertrand				Isabelle		Patrick	Maud	Maud	Teheiura		Guénaëlle					
Claude		Marine	Nicolas			Francis	Freddy	Wafa	Maud		Guénaëlle			Maud		
Maud				Patricia		Francis	Freddy	Wafa	Moussa		Claude					Bertrand
Coumba		Marine	Nicolas			Francis	Freddy	Wafa	Teheiura		Guénaëlle				Claude	
Patrick		Marine	Nicolas			Francis	Freddy	Wafa	Teheiura		Guénaëlle					Bertrand
Guénaëlle		Patrick	Claude			Francis	Freddy	Wafa	Moussa		Claude					Bertrand
Moussa				Isabelle		Patrick	Maud	Maud	Teheiura							Bertrand
Teheiura		Marine	Nicolas			Francis	Freddy	Wafa	Moussa		~~Moussa~~ (Note: Moussa was eliminated during the Immunity Challenge; the black vote is not counted.)					Bertrand
Wafa				Isabelle		Patrick	Maud	Maud	Teheiura							Bertrand
Freddy				Isabelle		Patrick	Maud	Maud								Bertrand
Francis				Isabelle		Patrick	Claude									Bertrand
Patricia				Francis												Bertrand
Isabelle				Francis		~~Freddy~~ (Note: Freddy won the Immunity Challenge; the black vote is not counted.)										
Nicolas		Patrick	Claude			Claude										
Marine		Patrick	Claude													
Fabienne																

Notes :

- A black background indicates the black vote.

== Ratings ==
This 3rd special season will be broadcast on TF1 every Friday at 8:45pm.

Episode	Broadcast date	Viewers	Ratings share (4 years and older)	References
1	April 6, 2012 20:50-22:55	7,768,000	31,9%	
2	April 13, 2012 20:50-22:25	7,274,000	27,7%	
3	April 20, 2012 20:50-22:20	6,687,000	25,2%	
4	April 27, 2012 20:50-22:55	7,035,000	28,9%	
5	May 4, 2012 20:50-22:30	7,268,000	27,1%	
6	May 11, 2012 20:50-22:30	7,318,000	28,5%	
7	May 18, 2012 20:50-22:30	7,200,000	30%	

Green background = best viewing numbers
Red background = worst viewing numbers
