= Koh-Lanta: Raja Ampat =

- Presented by: Denis Brogniart
- No. of days: 41
- No. of castaways: 20
- Winner: Gérard Urdampilleta
- Runner-up: Teheiura Teahui
- Location: Raja Ampat Islands, Indonesia
- No. of episodes: 13

Release
- Original release: 9 September – 16 December 2011

Season chronology
- ← Previous; Viêtnam Next → La Revanche des Héros

Koh-Lanta: Raja Ampat is the 11th season of Koh-lanta, the French version of Survivor. This season takes place in Indonesia on the archipelago of Raja Ampat Islands, and began broadcasting on TF1 on 9 September 2011, every Friday at 8:45pm (7:45 p.m. UTC) before Secret Story 2011.

Two new rules were introduced in this season. One is taken directly from the American Survivor format: the hidden immunity idol (represented as a necklace). There is also a new rule called the black vote, which allows an eliminated contestant to take revenge by voting once more against one of the remaining contestants. The finale was broadcast 16 December 2011 when, after 41 days, Gérard Urdampilleta won in a 7-2 jury vote against Teheiura Teahui to be given the title of Sole Survivor.

== Finishing order ==
| Contestant | Original tribe | Merged tribe | Finish |
|---|---|---|---|
| Lisa Legouverneur; 25, Jarny | Mambok | | 1st Voted Out; Day 3 |
| Catherine Diard; 53, Chaufour-Notre-Dame | Mambok | | 2nd Voted Out; Day 6 |
| Steve Lemercier; 24, Reims | Wasaï | | Left Competition; Day 8 |
| Gérard "Gégé" Icardi; 65, Vascœuil | Wasaï | | 3rd Voted Out; Day 9 |
| Nawal "Naouel" Hadjaf; 25, Aulnay-sous-Bois | Wasaï | | Left Competition; Day 10 |
| Benoît Mahieux; 31, Creil | Wasaï | | 4th Voted Out; Day 12 |
| Délisia Fettache; 21, Auberchicourt | Wasaï | | 5th Voted Out; Day 15 |
| Caroline Matteucci; 40, Lausanne, Switzerland | Wasaï | | 6th Voted Out; Day 18 |
| Maxime Boulet; 20, Brussels, Belgium | Mambok | | 7th Voted Out; Day 20 |
| Anthony Amar; 23, Villers-la-Montagne | Wasaï | Koh-Lanta | 8th Voted Out; 1st jury member Day 21 |
| Olivier Moenaert; 43, Lambersart | Mambok | Koh-Lanta | 9th Voted Out; 2nd jury member Day 24 |
| Florence Delbarre Reuter; 39, Lodève | Mambok | Koh-Lanta | 10th Voted Out; 3rd jury member Day 27 |
| Martin Bazin; Returned to Game | Mambok | Koh-Lanta | 11th Voted Out; Day 30 |
| Virginie Jarry; 32, Charleville-Mézières | Mambok | Koh-Lanta | Medically evacuated 4th jury member Day 33 |
| Patricia Morel; 36, Cahors | Wasaï | Koh-Lanta | 12th Voted Out; 5th jury member Day 33 |
| Alexandra Pouillon; 29, Paris | Wasaï | Koh-Lanta | 13th Voted Out; 6th jury member Day 36 |
| Martin Bazin; 23, Neuilly-sur-Seine | Mambok | Koh-Lanta | 14th Voted Out; 7th jury member Day 39 |
| Ella Gbezan; 24, Heusy, Belgium | Mambok | Koh-Lanta | Lost Challenge; 8th jury member Day 40 |
| Laurent Maistret; 29, Le Kremlin-Bicêtre | Mambok | Koh-Lanta | 15th Voted Out; 9th jury member Day 41 |
| Teheiura Teahui; 32, Reyssouze | Wasaï | Koh-Lanta | Runner-up; Day 41 |
| Gérard Urdampilleta; 41, Ascain | Mambok | Koh-Lanta | Sole Survivor; Day 41 |

=== Future appearances ===
Patricia Morel and Teheiura Teahui returned for Koh-Lanta: La Revanche des Héros. Teahui later returned again for Koh-Lanta: La Nouvelle Édition alongside Florence Delbarre Reuter, Martin Bazin and Laurent Maistret which Maistret won against Bazin. Olivier Moenaert returned for Koh-Lanta: Le Combat des Héros. Teahui later returned for a fourth time for Koh-Lanta: L'Île des héros. Maistret and Teahui returned again for Koh-Lanta: La Légende.

== Challenges ==
Challenges
Initial challenge
Anthony and Patricia
| Reward | Immunity | Eliminated | | vote | |
| Wasaï | Wasaï | Lisa | | 6-4 | |
| Wasaï | Wasaï | Catherine | | 5-4-1 | |
| Mambok | Mambok | Steve | Gégé | No vote | 7-1-1 |
| Mambok | Mambok | Naouel | Benoit | No vote | 4-2-1-1 |
| Wasaï | Mambok | Délisia | | 4-1-1-1 | |
| Mambok | Mambok | Caroline | | 3-2-1 | |
| Wasaï | Teheiura | Maxime | Anthony | 2 | 7-4-1-1 |
| Martin | Ella | Olivier | | ~~7~~-4 | |
| Teheiura | Martin | Florence | | 5-4-1 | |
| Teheiura | Laurent | Martin | | 6-2-1 | |
| Gérard | Teheiura | Virginie | Patricia | No vote | 4-2-2 |
| Gérard | Martin | Alexandra | | 4-3 | |
| Martin | Teheiura | Martin | | 4-2 | |
| Treasure Hunt | | Eliminated | | Vote | |
| Teheiura/Gérard/Laurent | | Ella | | 0 (lost challenge) | |
| Final Challenge | | Eliminated | | Vote | |
| Gérard | | Laurent | | 1 | |
| Runner-up | | Winner | | Jury vote | |
| Teheiura | | Gérard | | 7-2 | |

== Elimination table ==
| | Original tribes | | | | | | Merged tribe | | | | | | | | | | Jury | Total votes |
|---|---|---|---|---|---|---|---|---|---|---|---|---|---|---|---|---|---|---|
| Episode: | 1 | 2 | 3 | 4 | 5 | 6 | 7 | | 8 | 9 | 10 | 11 | 12 | 13 | 14 | Live | | |
| Gérard | Virginie | Virginie | Not eligible | Not eligible | Not eligible | Not eligible | Not eligible | Anthony | ~~Patricia~~ | Florence | Teiheiura | Patricia | Alexandra | Martin | Laurent | Winner | 7 | 0 |
| Teheiura | Not eligible | Not eligible | Gégé | Alexandra | Délisia | Patricia | Maxime | Olivier | Olivier | Florence | Martin | Martin | Ella | Martin | Not eligible | Runner-up | 2 | 5 |
| Laurent | Lisa | Virginie | Not eligible | Not eligible | Not eligible | Not eligible | Not eligible | Anthony | ~~Patricia~~ | Teiheiura | Martin | Patricia | Alexandra | Martin | Not eligible | Voted out (1 of 1) | Gérard | 1 |
| Ella | Lisa | Catherine | Not eligible | Not eligible | Not eligible | Not eligible | Not eligible | Anthony | ~~Patricia~~ | Teiheiura | Martin | Patricia | Alexandra | Martin | Eliminated (Challenge) | | Teiheiura | 10 |
| Martin | Virginie | Ella | Not eligible | Not eligible | Not eligible | Not eligible | Not eligible | Anthony | ~~Patricia~~ | Florence | Ella | Ella; Patricia | Alexandra | Ella | Voted out (4 of 6) | | Gérard | 12 |
| Alexandra | Not eligible | Not eligible | Gégé | Benoît | Délisia | Caroline | Not eligible | Olivier | Olivier | Florence | Martin | Martin | Ella | Ella | Voted out (4 of 7) | | Teiheiura | 10 |
| Patricia | Not eligible | Not eligible | Alexandra | Benoît | Caroline | Caroline | Not eligible | Olivier | Olivier | Florence | Ella | Ella | Ella | Voted out (4 of 8) | | | Gérard | 16 |
| Virginie | Lisa | Catherine | Not eligible | Not eligible | Not eligible | Not eligible | Not eligible | Anthony | ~~Patricia~~ | Teiheiura | Martin | Medical Ejection (Day 33) | | | | | Gérard | 8 |
| Florence | Lisa | Catherine | Not eligible | Not eligible | Not eligible | Not eligible | Not eligible | Anthony | ~~Patricia~~ | Teiheiura | Martin | Voted out (5 of 10) | | | | | Gérard | 5 |
| Olivier | Virginie | Virginie | Not eligible | Not eligible | Not eligible | Not eligible | Maxime | Anthony | ~~Patricia~~ | Patricia | Voted out (4 of 11) | | | | | | Gérard | 8 |
| Anthony | Not eligible | Not eligible | Gégé | Patricia | Délisia | Alexandra | Not eligible | Olivier | Olivier | Voted out (7 of 12) | | | | | | | Gérard | 7 |
| Maxime | Lisa | Catherine | Not eligible | Not eligible | Not eligible | Not eligible | Not eligible | Voted out (1 of 1) | | | | | | | | | | 1 |
| Caroline | Not eligible | Not eligible | Gégé | Benoît | Délisia | Patricia | | Alexandra | Voted out (3 of 6) | | | | | | | | | 4 |
| Délisia | Not eligible | Not eligible | Gégé | Benoît | Alexandra | Caroline | Voted out (4 of 7) | | | | | | | | | | | 6 |
| Benoît | Not eligible | Not eligible | Gégé | Alexandra | Patricia | Voted out (4 of 8) | | | | | | | | | | | | 4 |
| Naouel | Not eligible | Not eligible | Gégé | Walked (Day 10) | | | | | | | | | | | | | | 0 |
| Gégé | Not eligible | Not eligible | Délisia | Délisia | Voted out (7 of 9) | | | | | | | | | | | | | 7 |
| Steve | Not eligible | Not eligible | Walked (Day 8) | | | | | | | | | | | | | | | 0 |
| Catherine | Lisa | Virginie | Voted out (5 of 10) | | | | | Florence | Voted out (5 of 10) | | | | | | | | | 5 |
| Lisa | Virginie | Catherine | Voted out (6 of 10) | | | | | | | | | | | | | | | 6 |
