= Teheiura Teahui =

French Polynesian television personality

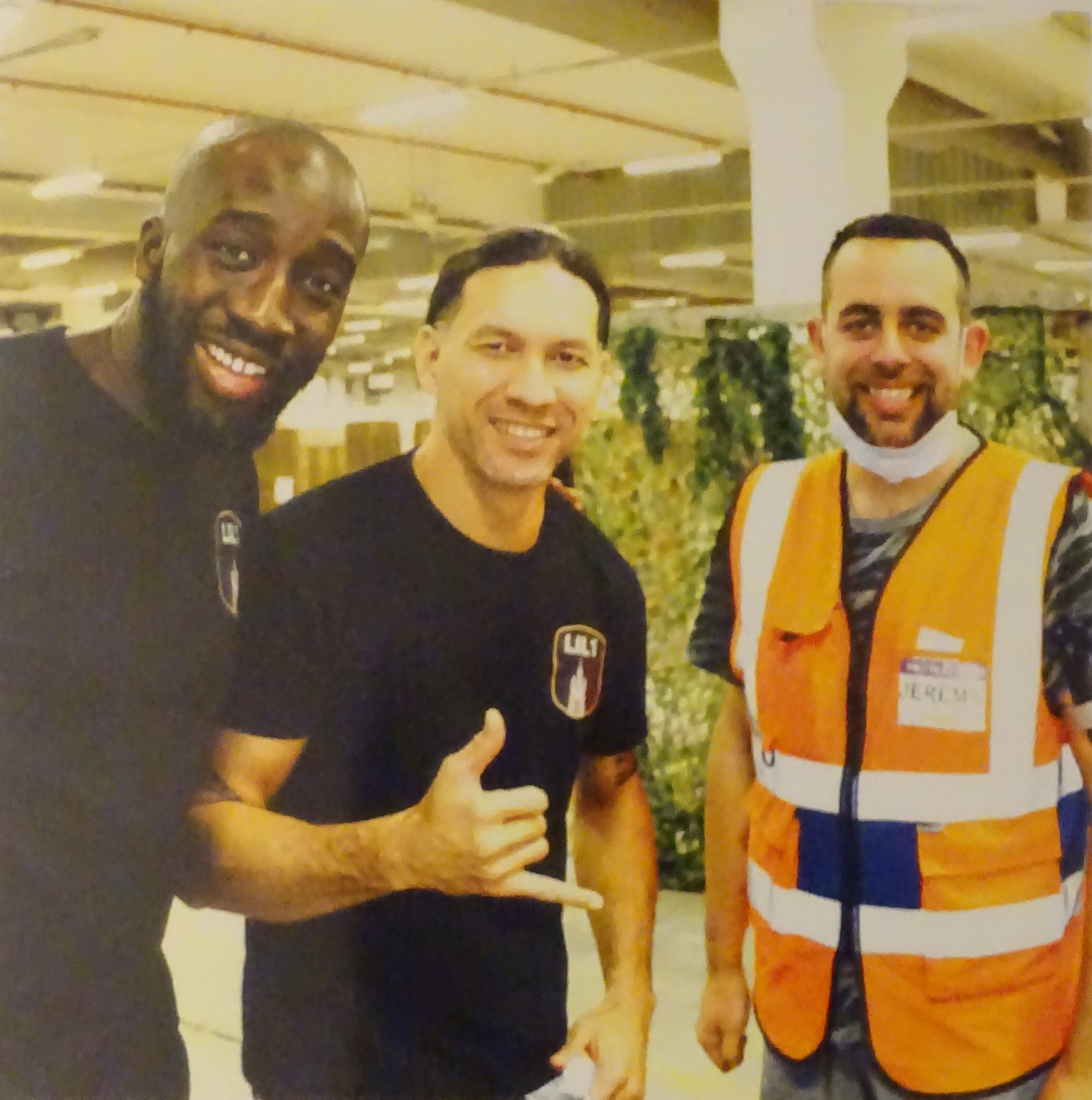
Teheiura Teahui (center)

Teheiura Teahui (born 7 May 1978) is a French Polynesian cook, host and television personality. He is mainly known for his participation in the Koh-Lanta show on TF1.

== Biography ==
Teahui was born in Papeete, French Polynesia, and grew up on the island of Taha'a.

Her first name means “the royal crown”. His father was adopted. His mother spoke to him in French to prepare for his future life. On his island he learned craft activities such as weaving and began to cook traditional food.

He moved to France at the age of 20 to study at the University of Montpellier, but instead trained as a chef. In 2015, he opened his food-truck named Le Manatoa which means "The spirit of the warrior" in Tahitian. He was also elected French barbecue champion several times.

== Television ==
=== Koh Lanta ===
Teheiura became known to the general public in 2011 during his participation in Koh-Lanta: Raja Ampat in Indonesia . He reached the final but failed to win, being beaten by Gérard Urdampilleta.

He tried his luck again in 2012 in Koh-Lanta: La Revanche des Héros, then in 2014 in La Nouvelle Édition, and in 2020 on Koh-Lanta: L'Île des héros. In his first three comebacks, he was eliminated midway through, finishing in 8th, 6th, and 9th place respectively. As a result, he is each time a member of the final jury.

He currently holds the record for most days of survival in the game with 103 days.

In the spring of 2021, Teheiura appeared in episode 3 of Koh-Lanta: Les Armes Secrètes at the end of the comfort game. However, he is not a candidate for the show, but shares his story and his survival techniques with the winning tribe.

In April 2021, the cast of the seventh special edition of Koh-Lanta, entitled Koh-Lanta: La Légende, was revealed and it is announced that Teheiura will participate for the fifth time in the show. He then declares that it is “his last Koh-Lanta”.

In 2021, during his participation in Koh-Lanta: The Legend filmed in French Polynesia, he was eliminated in the eleventh episode, after having denounced himself for cheating with the production (he signalled that he was hungry to fishermen who brought him food twice). In a long message posted on his Instagram account, he explained that he had "several times received requests from adventurers" to ask Polynesians for food. He adds that he gave in and then shared the food with other candidates. He explains that he denounced himself to the production. According to Le Parisien, Claude and Sam also benefited.

=== Other productions ===
In 2013, he participated in the show Fort Boyard on France 2 with Cyril Féraud, Stéphan Rizon, Danièle Évenou, Aïda Touihri and Samuel Étienne. The team played for the Cœur de gazelles association.

In 2016, he took part in the show Ninja Warrior : Le Parcours des héros on TF1.

In 2017 and 2018, he co-hosted with Laurent Maistret the show École Aventure on Télétoon+.

In 2020, he participated in District Z, a game presented by Denis Brogniart and broadcast on TF1.

In 2020, he participated in the Boyard Land Halloween special, presented by Olivier Minne on France 2. He played alongside Candice Pascal, Magloire and Terence Telle in favor of the Sourire à la vie association.

== Publications ==
On 2 December 2014, he published his book Culinary Adventure.

A second book recounting his life as an adventurer, Aventurier dans l'âme, was published on 22 August 2020 by the publisher Au vent des Îles.
