= Koh-Lanta: Caramoan =

- Presented by: Denis Brogniart
- No. of days: 40
- No. of castaways: 17
- Winner: Christelle Gauzet
- Runner-up: Frédéric Favier
- Location: Caramoan Peninsula, Camarines Sur, Philippines
- No. of episodes: 13

Release
- Original release: July 4 – September 20, 2008

Season chronology
- ← Previous; Palawan Next → Le Retour des Héros

Koh-Lanta: Caramoan was the eighth season of the French version of Survivor. This season took place on the Caramoan Peninsula, and was broadcast on TF1 from July 4, 2008 to September 20, 2008 airing on Fridays at 6:55 p.m. The two original tribes this season were Mingao and Tayak. Because Valérie and Céga left the game early, Irya came back into the game, and Alain joined later on.

The winner of this season of Koh-Lanta was Christelle who won the prize of €100,000.

== Contestants ==
List of Koh-Lanta: Caramoan contestants
Contestant				Tribe		Finish		
Name	Age	Residence	Occupation	Original	Merged	Placement	Jury	Day
Irya Cissé (Note: Returned to game.)				Mingao		1st voted out		Day 3
Valérie Tartacède-Bollaert	43	Paris	Expert surveyor	Mingao		Quit		Day 4
Céga Coulibaly	24	La Courneuve	Storekeeper	Mingao		Evacuated		Day 5
Irya Cissé	23	Créteil	Model	Mingao		2nd voted out		Day 6
Morgane Rodriguès	33	Landivisiau	Hairdresser	Tayak		3rd voted out		Day 9
Jessica Joullié	21	Bouzigues	Communications student	Mingao		4th voted out		Day 12
Alain Garcia	41	Grenoble	Baker	Mingao		5th voted out		Day 15
Jean-Bernard Hauton-Arnaud	40	Marseille	Insurance agent	Mingao	Koh-Lanta	6th voted out	1st member	Day 18
Hakim Djellali				Mingao	Koh-Lanta	7th voted out	~~2nd member~~	Day 21
Christopher Lavaud	25	Nogent-sur-Marne	Dietary company manager	Tayak	Koh-Lanta	Evacuated		Day 22
Christophe Guttatoro-Martin	39	Neuville-en-Avesnois	Pizzeria boss	Tayak	Koh-Lanta	8th voted out	2nd member	Day 24
Charlène Hoffness	20	Strasbourg	Literature student	Mingao	Koh-Lanta	9th voted out	3rd member	Day 27
Hakim Djellali	38	Nantes	Garbage collector	Mingao	Koh-Lanta	10th voted out	Evacuated	Day 30
Régis Colombier	56	Pézenas	Merchant	Mingao	Koh-Lanta	11th voted out	4th member	Day 33
Carole Rapin	41	La Limouzinière	Jewelry designer	Tayak	Koh-Lanta	12th voted out	5th member	Day 36
Nathalie Ensargueix	29	Montfermeil	Math teacher	Tayak	Koh-Lanta	Eliminated	6th member	Day 38
Bertrand Bolle	32	Perpignan	Helicopter pilot	Tayak	Koh-Lanta	13th voted out	7th member	Day 39
Frédéric Favier	31	Échirolles	Carpenter	Tayak	Koh-Lanta	Runner-up		Day 40
Christelle Gauzet	28	Gujan-Mestras	Police officer	Tayak	Koh-Lanta	Sole survivor		Day 40

=== Future appearances ===
Jean-Bernard Hauton-Arnaud and Christelle Gauzet late returned for Koh-Lanta: Le Retour des Héros. Christophe Guttatoro-Martin returned for Koh-Lanta: Le Choc des Héros. Bertrand Bolle returned for Koh-Lanta: La Revanche des Héros which Bolle won. Nathalie Ensargueix later returned for Koh-Lanta: Le Combat des Héros. Gauzet returned for a third time in Koh-Lanta: La Légende.

== Season summary ==
Koh-Lanta: Caramoan season summary
Episode		Challenge winner(s)		Eliminated	
No.	Air date	Reward	Immunity	Tribe	Player
1	July 4, 2008	Carole, Christopher, Frédéric, Nathalie	None	Mingao	Irya
1	July 4, 2008	Mingao	Tayak	Mingao	Irya
2	July 11, 2008	Tayak	Tayak	Mingao	Valérie
2	July 11, 2008	Tayak	Tayak	Mingao	Céga
2	July 11, 2008	Tayak	Tayak	Mingao	Irya
3	July 18, 2008	Tayak	Mingao	Tayak	Morgane
4	July 25, 2008	Tayak	Tayak	Mingao	Jessica
5	August 1, 2008	Tayak	Tayak	Mingao	Alain
6	August 8, 2008	Mingao	Bertrand	Koh-Lanta	Jean-Bernard
7	August 15, 2008	Bertrand, Charlène	Christopher	Koh-Lanta	Hakim
8	August 22, 2008	Christelle	Carole	Koh-Lanta	Christopher
8	August 22, 2008	Christelle	Carole	Koh-Lanta	Christophe
9	August 29, 2008	Bertrand [Frédéric]	Bertrand	Koh-Lanta	Charlène
10	September 5, 2008	Frédéric	Frédéric	Koh-Lanta	Hakim
11	September 12, 2008	Bertrand	Bertrand	Koh-Lanta	Régis
12	September 12, 2008	Nathalie [Christelle]	Frédéric	Koh-Lanta	Carole
13	September 20, 2008	None	Christelle, Frédéric, Bertrand	Koh-Lanta	Nathalie
13	September 20, 2008	None	Christelle	Koh-Lanta	Bertrand

== Voting history ==
	Original tribes							Merged tribe									
Episode	1	2			3	4	5	6	7	8		9	10	11	12	13	
Day	3	4	5	6	9	12	15	18	21	22	24	27	30	33	36	38	39
Tribe	Mingao	Mingao	Mingao	Mingao	Tayak	Mingao	Mingao	Koh-Lanta	Koh-Lanta	Koh-Lanta	Koh-Lanta	Koh-Lanta	Koh-Lanta	Koh-Lanta	Koh-Lanta	Koh-Lanta	Koh-Lanta
Eliminated	Irya	Valérie	Céga	Irya	Morgane	Jessica	Alain	Jean-Bernard	Hakim	Christopher	Christophe	Charlène	Hakim	Régis	Carole	Nathalie	Bertrand
Votes	4-3-1	None	None	4-1-1	7-1	4-2	3-2	7-3-1-0	5-3-1-1	None	8-1	6-1-1	5-1-1	5-1	4-1	None	1-0
Voter	Vote															Challenge	Vote
Christelle					Morgane			Jean-Bernard	Hakim		Christophe	Charlène	Hakim	Régis	Carole	1st	Bertrand
Frédéric					Morgane			Jean-Bernard	Hakim		Christophe	Charlène	Hakim	Régis	Carole	2nd	None
Bertrand					Morgane			Jean-Bernard	Hakim		Christophe	Charlène	Hakim	Régis	Carole	3rd	None
Nathalie					Morgane			Jean-Bernard	Régis		Christophe	Charlène	Hakim	Régis	Carole	4th	
Carole					Morgane			Jean-Bernard	Hakim		Christophe	Charlène	Hakim	Régis	Nathalie		
Régis	Irya			Irya		Jessica	Alain	Hakim	Nathalie		Christophe	Carole	Bertrand	Frédéric			
Hakim	Valérie			Charlène		Jessica	Charlène	Jean-Bernard	Charlène		Christophe	Charlène	Nathalie				
Charlène	Irya			Irya		Alain	Alain	Hakim	Nathalie		Christophe	Nathalie					
Christophe					Morgane			Régis	Hakim		Hakim						
Christopher					Morgane			Jean-Bernard	Nathalie	Evacuated							
Jean-Bernard	Irya			Irya		Jessica	Alain	Hakim									
Alain						Jessica	Charlène										
Jessica	Irya			Irya		Alain											
Morgane					Christophe												
Irya	Valérie			Jessica													
Céga	Valérie		Evacuated														
Valérie	Hakim	Quit															
Ambassadors								~~Bertrand~~ (Note: As the two ambassadors for the merged tribe, Bertrand and Jean-Bernard had to cast an extra vote for someone at the first post-merge Tribal Council. They could not come to a decision and drew rocks. Bertrand drew the rock but won immunity, nullifying the extra vote.)									

	Jury vote	
Episode	13	
Day	40	
Finalist	Christelle	Frédéric
Votes	6-1	
Juror	Vote	
Bertrand		Yes
Nathalie	Yes	
Carole	Yes	
Régis	Yes	
Charlène	Yes	
Christophe	Yes	
Jean-Bernard	Yes	
