= Koh-Lanta: Vanuatu =

2006 season of French television series

- Presented by: Denis Brogniart
- No. of days: 40
- No. of castaways: 16
- Winner: François-David Cardonnel
- Runner-up: Émilie Frahi
- Location: Vanuatu
- No. of episodes: 13

Release
- Original release: July 21 – September 5, 2006

Season chronology
- ← Previous; Pacifique Next → Palawan

Koh-Lanta: Vanuatu was the sixth season of Koh-Lanta, the French version of Survivor. This season took place in Vanuatu, and was broadcast on TF1 from July 21 to September 5, 2006, on Fridays at 6:55 p.m. The two original tribes this season were Mosso and Tana. Along with the typical aspects of the game, this season contestants had to deal with both a cyclone and a series of earthquakes (one of which damaged the immunity idol). Due to several medical evacuations, Alain, Nathalie, and Sébastien who were all initially eliminated early on returned to the game.

The winner was François-David Cardonnel who took home the prize of €100,000.

== Contestants ==
List of Koh-Lanta: Vanuatu contestants
Contestant				Tribe				Finish		
Name	Age	Residence	Occupation	Original	Day 12	Switch	Merged	Placement	Jury	Day
Karine Amorsi	24	Monnetier-Mornex	Retirement home caregiver	Tana				1st voted out		Day 3
Sébastien Roullé (Note: Returned to game.)				Tana				2nd voted out		Day 6
Nathalie Penigaud				Mosso				3rd voted out		Day 9
Malika "Mama" El Fayed	33	Savoie	Holiday center director	Mosso				Evacuated		Day 10
Nicolas-Benoit "Nicolas" Maire	42	Le Grau-du-Roi	Tennis instructor	Mosso				Evacuated		Day 12
Nicolas "Nico" Felger	26	Marseille	Sports salesman	Tana				4th voted out		Day 12
Alain Ponton				Mosso				5th voted out		Day 15
Jean-Claude Errin	60	Marly	Heating and sanitary warehouseman	Mosso				Evacuated		Day 18
Mickaël "Mika" Lelièvre	32	Yvelines	Cabinetmaker carpenter	Mosso				6th voted out		Day 18
Estelle Granger	33	Landes	Baker	Mosso			Koh-Lanta	7th voted out	1st member	Day 21
Nathalie Penigaud	38	Poitiers	Swimming pool company manager	Mosso			Koh-Lanta	8th voted out	2nd member	Day 24
Alain Ponton	49	Marne	Miller	Mosso			Koh-Lanta	9th voted out	3rd member	Day 27
Catherine Brun	43	La Bouilladisse	Housewife	Mosso			Koh-Lanta	10th voted out	4th member	Day 31
Gaëlle Zanetton	27	Annecy	Foreman	Tana			Koh-Lanta	11th voted out	5th member	Day 34
Marie Bayard Gautron	21	Les Rousses	Beautician	Tana			Koh-Lanta	12th voted out	6th member	Day 37
Ludovic "Ludo" Laresche	28	Montbéliard	Cheesemaker	Tana			Koh-Lanta	Eliminated	7th member	Day 38
Sébastien Roullé	30	Rouen	Car wash maintenance manager	Tana	Mosso	Tana	Koh-Lanta	13th voted out	8th member	Day 39
Émilie Frahi	24	Saint-Martin-d'Hères	Insurance advisor	Tana			Koh-Lanta	Runner-up		Day 40
François-David "F-D" Cardonnel	21	Beaucaire	Fencer	Tana			Koh-Lanta	Sole survivor		Day 40

=== Future appearances ===
- Émilie Frahi and François-David Cardonnel returned for Koh-Lanta: Le Retour des Héros.
- Ludovic Laresche returned for Koh-Lanta: Le Combat des Héros.

== Season summary ==
Koh-Lanta: Vanuatu season summary
Episode		Challenge winner(s)		Eliminated	
No.	Air date	Reward	Immunity	Tribe	Player
1	July 21, 2006	Tana	Mosso	Tana	Karine
2	July 28, 2006	Tana	Mosso	Tana	Sébastien
3	August 4, 2006	Mosso	Tana	Mosso	Nathalie
4	August 4, 2006	Tana	Mosso	Mosso	Mama (Note: Evacuated.)
4	August 4, 2006	Tana	Mosso	Mosso	Nicolas
4	August 4, 2006	Tana	Mosso	Tana	Nico
5	August 11, 2006	Tana	Tana	Mosso	Alain
6	August 11, 2006	Tana	Tana	Mosso	Jean-Claude
6	August 11, 2006	Tana	Tana	Mosso	Mika
7	August 18, 2006	Tana	Gaëlle	Koh-Lanta	Estelle
8	August 18, 2006	François-David	Sébastien	Koh-Lanta	Nathalie
9	August 22, 2006	Marie [Gaëlle]	Ludovic	Koh-Lanta	Alain
10	August 22, 2006	Marie [Gaëlle]	Émilie	Koh-Lanta	Catherine
11	August 29, 2006	Ludovic [Sébastien]	Sébastien	Koh-Lanta	Gaëlle
12	August 29, 2006	Ludovic [François-David]	François-David	Koh-Lanta	Marie
13	September 5, 2006	None	Émilie, François-David, Sébastien	Koh-Lanta	Ludovic
13	September 5, 2006	None	Émilie	Koh-Lanta	Sébastien

== Voting history ==
	Original tribes					Day 12 tribes	Switched tribes			Merged tribe							
Episode	1	2	3	4			5	6		7	8	9	10	11	12	13	
Day	3	6	9	10	12		15	18		21	24	27	31	34	37	38	39
Tribe	Tana	Tana	Mosso	Mosso	Mosso	Tana	Mosso	Mosso	Mosso	Koh-Lanta	Koh-Lanta	Koh-Lanta	Koh-Lanta	Koh-Lanta	Koh-Lanta	Koh-Lanta	Koh-Lanta
Eliminated	Karine	Sébastien	Nathalie	Mama	Nicolas	Nico	Alain	Jean-Claude	Mika	Estelle	Nathalie	Alain	Catherine	Gaëlle	Marie	Ludovic	Sébastien
Votes	4-2-1-1	4-3	5-3	None	None	4-2	4-2	None	3-2	7-2-1-1	8-1	6-2	6-1	5-1	4-1	None	1-0
Voter	Vote															Challenge	Vote
François-David	Karine	Sébastien				Nico				Estelle	Nathalie	Alain	Catherine	Gaëlle	Marie	2nd	None
Émilie	Karine	Sébastien				Nico				Estelle	Nathalie	Alain	Catherine	Gaëlle	Marie	1st	Sébastien
Sébastien	Marie	Émilie								Estelle	Nathalie	Alain	Catherine	Gaëlle	Marie	3rd	None
Ludovic	Émilie	Émilie				François-David				Estelle	Nathalie	Alain	Catherine	Gaëlle	Marie	4th	
Marie	Karine	Sébastien				Nico				Estelle	Nathalie	Alain	Catherine	Gaëlle	Émilie		
Gaëlle	Karine	Sébastien				Nico				Estelle	Nathalie	Alain	Catherine	François-David			
Catherine			Mama				Alain		Mika	Ludovic	Nathalie	Sébastien	Ludovic				
Alain			Nathalie				Catherine		Catherine	Nathalie	Nathalie	Sébastien					
Nathalie			Mama				Alain		Mika	François-David	François-David						
Estelle			Nathalie				Alain		Mika	Ludovic							
Mika			Nathalie				Catherine		Catherine								
Jean-Claude			Nathalie				Alain	Evacuated									
Nico	Sébastien	Émilie				François-David											
Nicolas			Mama		Evacuated												
Mama			Nathalie	Evacuated													
Karine	Sébastien																

Jury vote
Episode	13	
Day	40	
Finalist	François-David	Émilie
Votes	5-3	
Juror	Vote	
Sébastien		Yes
Ludovic		Yes
Marie	Yes	
Gaëlle	Yes	
Catherine	Yes	
Alain	Yes	
Nathalie	Yes	
Estelle		Yes
