= Koh-Lanta: La Légende =

Season of Koh-Lanta

- Presented by: Denis Brogniart
- No. of days: 36
- No. of castaways: 21 (Note: Loïc replaced Freddy, who had a shoulder injury.)
- Winner: None
- Location: Taha'a, French Polynesia

Release
- Original network: TF1
- Original release: 24 August – 14 December 2021

Season chronology
- ← Previous; Les Armes Secrètes Next → Le Totem Maudit

Koh-Lanta: La Légende (transl. "Koh-Lanta: The Legend") is the twenty-seventh season and seventh special season of the French reality television series Koh-Lanta. This season brings back 21 All Star players to commemorate the 20th anniversary of the show with the contestants living in harsher conditions than previously seen on the show whilst trying to survive each other and win €100,000.

The main twist this season is when contestants are voted out, they are not eliminated from the game. They are sent to the Isle of the Banished where they'll live with other eliminated contestants and compete against each other until only two remain. The two left on the Isle will return to the game at the merge.

The season premieres on 24 August 2021 on TF1. For the first time since Le Retour des Héros, the show will air every Tuesday. The season concluded on 14 December 2021 where Claude Dartois gained 9 jury votes against Laurent Maistret who received 4. However, due to Dartois and Maistret's cheating that was discovered after filming, Dartois lost his title as Sole Survivor and the €100,000 prize with the money being donated to a charity in remembrance of Les 4 Terres, Bertrand-Kamal Loudhriri who died of cancer.

== Contestants ==
Contestant	Original Tribe	Day 2 Tribe	Swapped Tribe	Merged Tribe	Voted Out	Isle of the Banished	Finish
Freddy Boucher; 36, Sydney, Australia; Palau, Le Choc des Héros, La Revanche des Héros & La Nouvelle Édition	Men (Note: Although the contestants were divided by gender, no tribes were formed yet when Freddy was medically evacuated from the game. Loïc joined the game to replace him on Day 2.)				Medically Evacuated; Day 2		21st Day 2
Patrick Merle; 51, Saint-Symphorien-de-Lay; Palau & La Revanche des Héros	Men	Men			3rd Voted Out; Day 5	Lost Challenge; Day 6	20th Day 6
Cindy Poumeyrol; 33, Bordeaux; La Guerre des Chefs	Women	Women			4th Voted Out; Day 5	Lost Challenge; Day 6	19th Day 6
Karima Najjarine; 32, Paris; Thaïlande	Women	Women			2nd Voted Out; Day 3	Lost Challenge; Day 9	18th Day 9
Maxime Berthon; 34, Poitiers; La Guerre des Chefs	Men	Men	Lanta-naï		5th Voted Out; Day 8	Lost Challenge; Day 12	17th Day 12
Candice Boisson; 24, Sainte-Colombe; L'Île au Trésor & Le Combat des Héros	Women	Women	Lanta-naï		7th Voted Out; Day 13	Lost Challenge; Day 15	16th Day 15
Clémentine Jullien; 29, Annecy; Cambodge & Le Combat des Héros	Women	Women	Korok		6th Voted Out; Day 11	Lost Challenge; 1st Jury Member; Day 18	15th Day 18
Namadia Thaï Thaï; 38, Claye-Souilly; Malaisie	Men	Men	Korok	Koh-Lanta	10th Voted Out; Day 19	Lost Challenge; 2nd Jury Member; Day 20	14th Day 20
Coumba Baradji; 38, Nanterre; Pacifique, Le Choc des Héros & La Revanche des Héros	Women	Women	Lanta-naï		9th Voted Out; Day 18	Lost Challenge; 3rd Jury Member; Day 23	13th Day 23
Clémence Castel; 36, Saint-Lô; Pacifique, Le Retour des Héros & Le Combat des Héros	Women	Women	Lanta-naï	Koh-Lanta	8th Voted Out; Day 16	2nd Returnee; Day 18	12th Day 23
Clémence Castel; 36, Saint-Lô; Pacifique, Le Retour des Héros & Le Combat des Héros	Women	Women	Lanta-naï	Koh-Lanta	11th Voted Out; Day 22	Lost Challenge; 4th Jury Member; Day 23	12th Day 23
Teheiura Teahui; 43, Cazouls-lès-Béziers; Raja Ampat, La Revanche des Héros, La Nouvelle Édition & L'Île des héros	Men	Men	Korok	Koh-Lanta	Eliminated; Day 25	Ejected; 5th Jury Member; Day 26	11th Day 26
Alexandra Pornet; 34, Ferney-Voltaire; Les 4 Terres	Women	Women	Korok	Koh-Lanta	Lost Challenge; Day 22	Lost Challenge; 6th Jury Member; Day 27	10th Day 27
Loïc Riowal; 21, Les Échelles; Les 4 Terres		Men	Korok	Koh-Lanta	Lost Challenge; Day 28	Lost Challenge; 7th Jury Member; Day 31	9th Day 31
Christelle Gauzet; 41, Gujan-Mestras; Caramoan & Le Retour des Héros	Women	Women	Lanta-naï	Koh-Lanta	12th Voted Out; Day 25	Lost Challenge; 8th Jury Member; Day 31	8th Day 31
Alix Noblat; 30, Marseille; Les 4 Terres	Women	Women	Korok	Koh-Lanta	14th Voted Out; Day 29	Lost Challenge; 9th Jury Member; Day 33	7th Day 33
Sam Haliti; 23, Pfaffenheim; L'Île des héros	Men	Men	Lanta-naï	Koh-Lanta	Lost Challenge; Day 32	Lost Challenge; 10th Jury Member; Day 33	6th Day 33
Jade Handi; 39, Toulouse; Palawan & Le Retour des Héros	Women	Women	Korok	Koh-Lanta	Lost Challenge; 11th Jury Member; Day 34		5th Day 34
Philippe "Phil" Bizet; 50, Freulleville; Malaisie & La Nouvelle Édition	Men	Men	Lanta-naï	Koh-Lanta	Lost Challenge; 12th Jury Member; Day 34		4th Day 34
Ugo Lartiche; 40, Perpignan; Malaisie	Men	Men	(Note: Ugo was on Isle of the Banished when the swap occurred. He returned when the tribes merged.)	Koh-Lanta	1st Voted Out; Day 3		1st Returnee; Day 18
Ugo Lartiche; 40, Perpignan; Malaisie	Men	Men	(Note: Ugo was on Isle of the Banished when the swap occurred. He returned when the tribes merged.)	Koh-Lanta	15th Voted Out; Day 32		3rd Returnee; Day 33
Ugo Lartiche; 40, Perpignan; Malaisie	Men	Men	(Note: Ugo was on Isle of the Banished when the swap occurred. He returned when the tribes merged.)	Koh-Lanta	16th Voted Out; 13th Jury Member; Day 35		3rd Day 35
Laurent Maistret; 39, Le Kremlin-Bicêtre; Raja Ampat & La Nouvelle Édition	Men	Men	Korok	Koh-Lanta	~~Runner-up~~; Day 35		~~2nd~~ Day 35
Claude Dartois; 42, Puteaux; Viêtnam, La Revanche des Héros & L'Île des héros	Men	Men	Lanta-naï	Koh-Lanta	~~Sole Survivor~~; Day 35		~~1st~~ Day 35

== Challenges ==
Episode	Air date	Challenges		Voted Out	Isle of the Banished	Eliminated	Finish
Episode	Air date	Reward	Immunity	Voted Out	Isle of the Banished	Eliminated	Finish
Episode 1 (Note: The castaways were divided by gender for the first two episodes and competed in their gender groups for Immunity. The top two in each challenge were awarded immunity, with the overall winner in each group also receiving an advantage, while the bottom two in each challenge received a penalty vote at the next Tribal Council. Each tribe attended Tribal Council separately and voted someone out.)	24 August 2021					Freddy	Medically Evacuated; Day 2
Episode 1	24 August 2021	Claude (Note: As winners of the first immunity challenge, Claude & Coumba were allowed to select someone on the opposing tribe who would be allowed to vote twice. They selected each other.); Laurent		Ugo			
Episode 1	24 August 2021	Coumba; Alix		Karima			
Episode 2	31 August 2021	Loïc; Teheiura (Note: As winners of the second immunity challenge, Loïc & Clémence were allowed to select someone on the opposing tribe to receive immunity after the votes were cast but before they were read - which functioned like they had played a Hidden Immunity Idol. They chose Alexandra and Maxime respectively, nullifying four votes for each of them.)		Patrick			
Episode 2	31 August 2021	Clémence; Jade		Cindy			
Episode 3	14 September 2021	Lanta-naï	Korok	Maxime	Ugo; Karima	Patrick	1st Eliminated; Day 6
Episode 3	14 September 2021	Lanta-naï	Korok	Maxime	Ugo; Karima	Cindy	2nd Eliminated; Day 6
Episode 4	21 September 2021	Lanta-naï	Lanta-naï	Clémentine	Ugo; Maxime	Karima	3rd Eliminated; Day 9
Episode 5	28 September 2021	Teheiura; Claude; Phil	Korok	Candice	Ugo; Clémentine	Maxime	4th Eliminated; Day 12
Episode 5	28 September 2021	Teheiura; Claude; Phil	Phil (Note: Korok were allowed to choose one candidate from Lanta-Naï to have immunity at Day 13's Tribal Council - they chose Phil.)	Candice	Ugo; Clémentine	Maxime	4th Eliminated; Day 12
Episode 6	5 October 2021	Lanta-naï	Korok	Clémence	Ugo; Clémentine	Candice	5th Eliminated; Day 15
Episode 7	12 October 2021	Korok			Ugo; Clémence (Note: Ugo & Clémence won their way back into the game by winning the Day 18 Isle of the Banished challenge. In addition, they acted as Secret Ambassadors at the Ambassadors' Summit - they could vote, but not be voted for, and were not at risk of going home if the Ambassadors could not make a unanimous decision.)	Clémentine	6th Eliminated; Day 18
Episode 8	19 October 2021			Coumba			
Episode 8	19 October 2021		Clémence	Namadia			
Episode 9	26 October 2021	Teheiura [Sam]	Ugo	Alexandra	Coumba	Namadia	7th Eliminated; Day 20
Episode 9	26 October 2021	Teheiura [Sam]	Ugo	Clémence	Coumba	Namadia	7th Eliminated; Day 20
Episode 10 (Note: For the entirety of the tenth episode, castaways were paired and would win challenges as a pair. In addition, the castaway voted out also brought their partner out of the game with them. These divisions are listed in pairs of colours on the voting table.)	2 November 2021	Alix & Phil	Ugo & Loïc	Christelle	Alexandra	Coumba	8th Eliminated; Day 22
Episode 10	2 November 2021	Alix & Phil	Ugo & Loïc	Teheiura	Alexandra	Clémence	9th Eliminated; Day 22
Episode 11	9 November 2021	Claude; Laurent			Christelle	Teheiura	Ejected; Day 26
Episode 11	9 November 2021	Claude; Laurent			Christelle	Alexandra	10th Eliminated; Day 27
Episode 12	23 November 2021	Claude [Laurent]	Ugo	Loïc			
Episode 12	23 November 2021	Claude [Laurent]	Ugo	Alix			
Episode 13	30 November 2021	Claude; Jade; Phil	Claude	Sam	Alix	Loïc	11th Eliminated; Day 31
Episode 13	30 November 2021	Claude; Jade; Phil	Claude	Ugo	Alix	Christelle	12th Eliminated; Day 31
Episode 14	7 December 2021				Ugo (Note: Ugo won his way back into the game again by winning the Isle of the Banished challenge on Day 33.)	Alix	13th Eliminated; Day 33
Episode 14	7 December 2021				Ugo	Sam	14th Eliminated; Day 33
Episode 14	7 December 2021		Ugo; Claude; Laurent	Jade			Lost Challenge; 11th Jury Member; Day 34
Episode 14	7 December 2021		Ugo; Claude; Laurent	Phil			Lost Challenge; 12th Jury Member; Day 34
Episode 15	14 December 2021		Laurent	Ugo			15th Voted Out; 13th Jury Member; Day 35
Episode 15	14 December 2021			Jury vote			
Episode 15	14 December 2021			Laurent			~~Runner-up~~; Day 35
Episode 15	14 December 2021			Claude			~~Sole Survivor~~; Day 35

== Voting history ==
	Original tribes (Note: The game started out with the two tribes divided into Men's and Women's tribes, who would compete individually in the first two rounds of play. Neither tribe had an official tribe colour, but they are listed here as blue and pink respectively to make the votes clear.)					Switched tribes					
Episode #	1			2		3	4	5		6	8
Day #	2	3		5		8	11	13		16	18
Voted out	Freddy	Ugo	Karima	Patrick	Cindy	Maxime	Clémentine	Tie	Candice	Clémence	Coumba
Vote	Evacuated (Note: No vote; Freddy was medically evacuated from the game.)	9-1-1	6-5-1-1	6-1-0	6-1-0	6-1-1	4-2-2	1-1-0 (Note: Clémence used an Immunity Idol at Tribal Council. As a result, five votes against her did not count. As a result, a revote was done in which the tribe could only vote for Sam and Candice, who tied in the original vote.)	5-2	5-1	Consensus
Claude		Ugo		~~Maxime~~		Maxime		~~Clémence~~	Candice	Clémence	
Claude		Ugo		~~Maxime~~		Maxime		~~Clémence~~	Candice	Clémence	
Laurent		Ugo		~~Maxime~~			Jade				Coumba
Ugo		Patrick									Coumba
Phil		Ugo		Patrick		Maxime		~~Clémence~~	Candice	Clémence	None (Note: Although Phil was chosen by Korok to represent Lanta-naï at the Ambassadors' Meeting, only 3 Ambassadors needed to vote. He decided not to vote and allowed Korok's representative - Laurent and the Isle of the Banished returnees - Clémence and Ugo to vote instead.)
Jade			Clémence		Cindy		Laurent				
Sam		Ugo		Patrick		Maxime		~~Clémence~~	Candice	Clémence	
Alix			Karima		Cindy		Jade				
Loïc		None (Note: As Loïc entered the game as a replacement for Freddy after the Immunity Challenge, he was immune at the first Tribal Council, but was unable to cast a vote.)		Patrick			Clémentine				
Teheiura		Ugo		~~Maxime~~			Clémentine				
Christelle			Clémence		~~Alexandra~~	Maxime		~~Clémence~~	Candice	Clémence	
Clémence			Karima		Cindy	Phil		Sam	Sam	Sam	Coumba
Alexandra			Karima		Cindy		Clémentine				
Namadia		Ugo		Patrick			Clémentine				
Coumba			Clémence		~~Alexandra~~	Maxime		Candice	Candice	Clémence	
Coumba			Clémence		~~Alexandra~~	Maxime		Candice	Candice	Clémence	
Candice			Karima		~~Alexandra~~	Maxime		~~Clémence~~	Sam		
Clémentine			Karima		Cindy		Laurent				
Maxime		Ugo		Patrick		Christelle					
Cindy			Karima		~~Alexandra~~						
Patrick		Ugo		~~Maxime~~							
Karima			Clémence								
Freddy											
Penalty votes		~~Freddy~~ (Note: As Freddy and Sam were the last two to finish the immunity challenge, they received penalty votes at the next tribal council. Freddy's medical evacuation cancelled his penalty vote.)	Alexandra (Note: As Alexandra and Clémentine were the last two to finish the immunity challenge, they received penalty votes at the next tribal council.)	Patrick (Note: As Patrick and Laurent were the last two to finish the immunity challenge, they received penalty votes at the next tribal council.)	Christelle (Note: As Christelle and Cindy were the last two to finish the immunity challenge, they received penalty votes at the next tribal council.)						
Penalty votes		Sam	Clémentine	Laurent	Cindy						

	Merged tribe											
Episode #	8	9		10		12		13		14		15
Day #	19	22		25		28	29	32		34		35
Voted out	Namadia	Alexandra	Clémence	Christelle	Teheiura	Loïc	Alix	Sam	Ugo	Jade	Phil	Ugo
Vote	4-2-1-0 (Note: Alix used an Immunity Idol at Tribal Council. As a result, seven votes against her did not count.)	Challenge	7-5	4-2-2-2-2-1	Tied Destiny	Challenge	5-2-1, (Note: Claude used an Immunity Idol at Tribal Council. As a result, zero votes against him did not count.) (Note: Laurent used an Immunity Idol at Tribal Council. As a result, zero votes against him did not count.)	Challenge	4-2	Challenge		1-0
Claude	~~Alix~~		Alix	Phil			Alix		Jade			
Claude	~~Alix~~		Alix	Phil			Alix (Note: Upon her exit, Christelle willed an extra vote for the fourth Merged Tribal Council to Claude.)		Jade			
Laurent	Christelle		Clémence	Christelle			Alix		Ugo			Ugo
Laurent	Christelle		Clémence (Note: Upon his exit, Namadia willed an extra vote for the second Merged Tribal Council to Laurent.)	Christelle			Alix		Ugo			Ugo
Ugo	~~Alix~~		Alix	Jade			Jade		Jade			
Ugo	~~Alix~~		Alix	Sam (Note: Upon her exit, Clémence willed an extra vote for the third Merged Tribal Council to Ugo.)			Jade		Jade			
Phil	~~Alix~~		Clémence	Christelle			Jade		Ugo			
Jade	~~Alix~~		Alix	Laurent			Alix		Ugo			
Jade	~~Alix~~		Alix	Laurent			Alix		Ugo (Note: Upon her exit, Alix willed an extra vote for the fifth Merged Tribal Council to Jade.)			
Sam	~~Alix~~		Clémence	Alix			Alix					
Alix	Namadia		Clémence	Christelle			Sam					
Loïc	Christelle		Clémence	Christelle								
Teheiura	~~Alix~~		Clémence	Alix								
Christelle	Alexandra		Alix	Phil								
Clémence	Namadia		Alix									
Alexandra	Namadia											
Namadia	~~Alix~~											
Penalty votes	Namadia (Note: Namadia finished last in the Episode 8 Immunity Challenge and received a penalty vote at the next Tribal Council.)			Jade (Note: As Jade and Sam were the last two to finish the Immunity Challenge, they received penalty votes at the next Tribal Council.)								
Penalty votes	Namadia			Sam								

Jury vote
Episode #	15	
Day #	36	
Finalist	Laurent	Claude
Votes	~~9-4~~ (Note: After the season, the Production team discovered multiple instances of cheating amongst the contestants. As a result, Claude's victory was invalidated and no Sole Survivor was crowned. Instead, the Grand Prize was given to a charity in remembrance of Bertrand-Kamal Loudhriri (Koh-Lanta: Les 4 Terres).)	
Juror	Vote	
Ugo		~~Claude~~
Phil		~~Claude~~
Jade	~~Laurent~~	
Sam		~~Claude~~
Alix	~~Laurent~~	
Christelle		~~Claude~~
Loïc	~~Laurent~~	
Alexandra		~~Claude~~
Teheiura		~~Claude~~
Clémence		~~Claude~~
Coumba		~~Claude~~
Namadia	~~Laurent~~	
Clémentine		~~Claude~~
