= Koh-Lanta: Palawan =

- Presented by: Denis Brogniart
- No. of days: 40
- No. of castaways: 16
- Winners: Jade Handi & Kevin Cuoco
- Location: Palawan, Philippines
- No. of episodes: 13

Release
- Original network: TF1
- Original release: June 29 – September 11, 2007

Season chronology
- ← Previous; Vanuatu Next → Caramoan

Koh-Lanta: Palawan was the seventh season of the French version of Survivor, Koh-Lanta. This season took place in Philippines in Palawan, and was broadcast on TF1 from June 29, 2007 to September 11, 2007 airing on Fridays at 6:55 p.m. The two original tribes this season were Batang and Guntao. Due to the voluntary exits of Ali and Andrien, both Grégoire and Pascale re-entered the competition after their initial eliminations. This season, like in Bocas del Toro, both finalists received three jury votes and were both given the titles of Survivor.

The winners of this season of Koh-Lanta were Jade Handi and Kevin Cuoco who split the prize of €110,000 after tying in the final tribal council with a 3-3 jury vote.

== Contestants ==
List of Koh-Lanta: Palawan contestants
Contestant				Tribe				Finish		
Name	Age	Residence	Occupation	Original		Switch	Merged	Placement	Jury	Day
Name	Age	Residence	Occupation	Day 1	Day 5	Switch	Merged	Placement	Jury	Day
Pascale Bodin (Note: Returned to game.)				Guntao				1st voted out		Day 4
Ali Jaffar	35	Stains	Metro driver	Batang				Quit		Day 5
Pascale Bodin	39	Semussac	Entrepreneur	Guntao	Batang			2nd voted out		Day 7
Marie-Laure Dagniaux	23	Paris	Former model	Batang				3rd voted out		Day 10
Mélanie Guyon	24	Besançon	Hairdresser	Batang				4th voted out		Day 13
Véronique Lambert	50	Lille	Financial advisor	Guntao				5th voted out		Day 16
Chloé Vavasseur	25	Rouen	Human resources officer	Guntao				6th voted out		Day 19
Érick Africaa	32	Nîmes	Sports coach	Guntao		Batang	Koh-Lanta	7th voted out		Day 22
Filomène Mendonca	35	Boulogne-Billancourt	Insurance manager	Guntao			Koh-Lanta	8th voted out	1st member	Day 25
Grégoire Delachaux				Guntao			Koh-Lanta	9th voted out	~~2nd member~~	Day 28
Adrien Torrin	55	Modane	Retired SNCF agent	Guntao			Koh-Lanta	Quit		Day 29
Grégoire Delachaux	24	Orgeval	Gardener	Guntao			Koh-Lanta	10th voted out	2nd member	Day 31
Laurent Boudes	34	Sète	Shellfish wholesaler	Guntao			Koh-Lanta	11th voted out	3rd member	Day 34
Patrick Brasier De Thuy	40	Villeneuve d'Ascq	Entrepreneur	Batang			Koh-Lanta	12th voted out	4th member	Day 37
Simon Quintilla	26	Narbonne	Lumberjack	Batang			Koh-Lanta	Eliminated	5th member	Day 38
Maryline Hemelsdael	36	Sainghin-en-Weppes	Farmer	Batang			Koh-Lanta	13th voted out	6th member	Day 39
Jade Handi	24	Toulouse	Leisure center manager	Batang			Koh-Lanta	Dual survivors		Day 40
Kevin Cuoco Giudicelli	21	Le Beausset	Kart racer	Batang			Koh-Lanta	Dual survivors		Day 40

=== Future appearances ===
- Filomène Fortes and Jade Handi returned for Koh-Lanta: Le Retour des Héros.
- Grégoire Delachaux returned for Koh-Lanta: Le Choc des Héros, which Delachaux won.
- Handi returned for a third time in Koh-Lanta: La Légende.

== Season summary ==
Koh-Lanta: Palawan season summary
Episode		Challenge winner(s)			Eliminated	
No.	Air date	Reward		Immunity	Tribe	Player
1	June 30, 2007	Érick (Guntao)	Jade (Batang)	None	Guntao	Pascale
1	June 30, 2007	Batang		Batang	Guntao	Pascale
2	July 6, 2007	Guntao		Guntao	Batang	Ali (Note: Quit.)
2	July 6, 2007	Guntao		Guntao	Batang	Pascale
3	July 13, 2007	Guntao		Guntao	Batang	Marie-Laure
4	July 20, 2007	Batang		Guntao	Batang	Mélanie
5	July 27, 2007	Batang		Batang	Guntao	Véronique
6	August 3, 2007	Batang		Batang	Guntao	Chloé
7	August 10, 2007	Guntao		Grégoire	Koh-Lanta	Érick
8	August 17, 2007	Patrick [Simon]		Grégoire	Koh-Lanta	Filomène
9	August 24, 2007	Grégoire [Jade]		Jade	Koh-Lanta	Grégoire
10	August 31, 2007	Laurent		Jade	Koh-Lanta	Adrien
10	August 31, 2007	Laurent		Jade	Koh-Lanta	Grégoire
11	September 4, 2007	Simon		Patrick	Koh-Lanta	Laurent
12	September 4, 2007	Kevin		Simon	Koh-Lanta	Patrick
13	September 11, 2007	None		Jade, Kevin, Maryline	Koh-Lanta	Simon
13	September 11, 2007	None		Jade	Koh-Lanta	Maryline

== Voting history ==
	Original tribes		Day 5 tribes		Switched tribes			Merged tribe									
Episode	1	2		3	4	5	6	7	8	9	10		11	12		13	
Tribe	Guntao	Batang	Batang	Batang	Batang	Guntao	Guntao	Koh-Lanta	Koh-Lanta	Koh-Lanta	Koh-Lanta	Koh-Lanta	Koh-Lanta	Koh-Lanta		Koh-Lanta	Koh-Lanta
Eliminated	Pascale	Ali	Pascale	Marie-Laure	Mélanie	Véronique	Chloé	Érick	Filomène	Grégoire	Adrien	Grégoire	Laurent	Tie	Patrick	Simon	Maryline
Votes	5-3	None	7-1	6-1	5-1-1	5-1	3-2	6-5	5-4	5-2-1	None	4-1-1-1	5-1	2-2-1	3-2	None	1-0
Voter	Vote															Challenge	Vote
Jade			Pascale	Marie-Laure	Mélanie			Érick	Filomène	Grégoire		Laurent	Laurent	Kevin	Patrick	1st	Maryline
Kevin			Pascale	Marie-Laure	Mélanie			Érick	Filomène	Grégoire		Grégoire	Laurent	Maryline	Maryline	2nd	None
Maryline			Pascale	Marie-Laure	Mélanie			Érick	Filomène	Grégoire		Grégoire	Laurent	Patrick	Patrick	3rd	None
Simon			Pascale	Marie-Laure	Mélanie			Érick	Filomène	Grégoire		Grégoire	Laurent	Patrick	Patrick	4th	
Patrick			Pascale	Marie-Laure	Érick			Érick	Filomène	Grégoire		Grégoire	Laurent	Maryline	Maryline		
Laurent	Pascale					Véronique	Chloé	Patrick	Patrick	Simon		Maryline	Kevin				
Grégoire	Pascale					Véronique	Chloé	Patrick	Patrick	Patrick		Patrick					
Adrien	Pascale					Véronique	Chloé	Patrick	Patrick	Patrick	Quit						
Filomène	Véronique					Véronique	Adrien	Patrick	Patrick								
Érick	Pascale				Mélanie			Patrick									
Chloé	Véronique					Véronique	Adrien										
Véronique	Pascale					Filomène											
Mélanie			Pascale	Marie-Laure	Patrick												
Marie-Laure			Pascale	Simon													
Pascale	Véronique		Mélanie														
Ali		Quit															
Ambassadors								Érick									

Jury vote
Episode	13	
Day	40	
Finalist	Jade	Kevin
Votes	3-3	
Juror	Vote	
Maryline	Yes	
Simon	Yes	
Patrick		Yes
Laurent		Yes
Grégoire		Yes
Filomène	Yes	
