= Pholien Systermans =

Belgian swimmer (born 1990)

Personal information
- Full name: Pholien Systermans
- Nationality: Belgium
- Born: 27 March 1990 (age 36) Liège, Belgium

Sport
- Sport: Swimming
- Strokes: Freestyle
- Club: Liège Natation
Medal record
Representing Belgium
European Junior Championships
Bronze medal – third place	2007 Antwerp	4x100m freestyle relay

Pholien Systermans (born 27 March 1990 in Liège). is a Belgian swimmer who gained the Belgian 100m freestyle record in 2009.

Systermans was coached at Liège Natation by André Henveaux and is currently studying at the University of Florida. As a junior, he had been part of the 4x100 freestyle relay team that gained a bronze medal for Belgium at the 2007 European Junior Swimming Championships. In 2009 he was fined €1500 for wearing the 'wrong costume' at a Rome swimming meet, a decision which he challenged legally in May 2010.

At the 2010 European Aquatics Championships, Systermans was part of the Belgian 4 × 200 m relay team. They came seventh in the final.

In 2020, he works as a physiotherapist-osteopath in France. He also participates in the sixth special season of Koh-Lanta, Koh-Lanta: L'Île des héros.
