= Koh-Lanta: Pacifique =

- Presented by: Denis Brogniart
- No. of days: 40
- No. of castaways: 17
- Winner: Clémence Castel
- Runner-up: Francis Bordas
- Location: New Caledonia, Isle of Pines
- No. of episodes: 13

Release
- Original release: July 1 – September 6, 2005

Season chronology
- ← Previous; Panama Next → Vanuatu

Koh-Lanta: Pacifique was the fifth season of the French version of Survivor Koh-Lanta. This season was held in New Caledonia on the Isle of Pines. It was broadcast on TF1 from Tuesday July 5, 2005 to Tuesday August 31, 2004. The two tribes original tribes this season were Kanawa and Kumo. Episode one of this saw the first ever double tribal council to occur in the history of Koh-Lanta. The reason for this was because it was discovered that the Kumo tribe had all openly discussed who would be leaving at the first tribal council. Due to the voluntary exit of Aude, a joker, Caroline entered the game in episode two. This also caused the re-entrance of Francis into the competition.

The winner of this season of Koh-lanta was Clémence Castel, who took home the prize of €100,000.

== Contestants ==
List of Koh-Lanta: Pacifique contestants
Contestant				Tribe				Finish		
Name	Age	Residence	Occupation	Original		Switch	Merged	Placement	Jury	Day
Name	Age	Residence	Occupation	Day 1	Day 5	Switch	Merged	Placement	Jury	Day
Aude Réant	30	Roissy-en-Brie	Makeup artist	Kumo				1st voted out		Day 3
Mathieu Huguin	21	Nancy	Pharmacy student	Kumo				2nd voted out		Day 3
Francis Bordas (Note: Returned to game.)				Kanawa	Kanawa			3rd voted out		Day 6
Sylvie Sébert	43	Aulnay-sous-Bois	Funeral director	Kanawa	Kanawa			Evacuated		Day 9
Caroline Colusso	29	Bayonne	Fashion designer		Kumo			4th voted out		Day 9
Marie-Cécile Maréchal	21	Mézy-sur-Seine	Unemployed	Kumo	Kumo	Kumo		5th voted out		Day 12
Éliane Vigneron	40	Toulon	Naval tailor	Kanawa	Kanawa	Kanawa		6th voted out		Day 15
Thierry Ramos	38	Romans-sur-Isère	Butcher	Kanawa	Kanawa	Kanawa		7th voted out		Day 18
Sakhone Holaphong	23	Nogent-sur-Marne	Commercial agent	Kumo	Kumo	Kumo	Koh-Lanta	8th voted out		Day 22
Jérôme Villaseque	33	Annecy	Police diver	Kanawa	Kanawa	Kumo	Koh-Lanta	9th voted out	1st member	Day 25
Christine Isoart	35	Toulon	Driving school operator	Kanawa	Kanawa	Kanawa	Koh-Lanta	10th voted out	2nd member	Day 28
Coumba Baradji	22	Nanterre	Waitress	Kumo	Kumo	Kumo	Koh-Lanta	11th voted out	3rd member	Day 31
Pierre Vaney	51	Nancy	Graphic studio manager	Kanawa	Kanawa	Kanawa	Koh-Lanta	12th voted out	4th member	Day 34
Véronique Lobjoie	37	Saint-Quentin	Advertising manager	Kanawa	Kanawa	Kanawa	Koh-Lanta	13th voted out	5th member	Day 37
Alexis Tournier	28	Lyon	Seer/astrologer	Kumo	Kumo	Kumo	Koh-Lanta	Eliminated	6th member	Day 38
Mohamed Derradji	24	Colombes	Bus driver	Kumo	Kumo	Kumo	Koh-Lanta	14th voted out	7th member	Day 39
Francis Bordas	59	Périgueux	Retired manager	Kanawa	Kanawa	Kanawa	Koh-Lanta	Runner-up		Day 40
Clémence Castel	20	Toulouse	STAPS student	Kumo	Kumo	Kumo	Koh-Lanta	Sole survivor		Day 40

=== Future appearances ===
- Clémence Castel returned for Koh-Lanta: Le Retour des Héros.
- Coumba Baradji and Mohamed Derradji returned for Koh-Lanta: Le Choc des Héros.
- Baradji later returned alongside Francis Bordas for Koh-Lanta: La Revanche des Héros.
- Castel later returned for a third time for Koh-Lanta: Le Combat des Héros, which she won.
- Castel and Baradji returned again for Koh-Lanta: La Légende.

== Season summary ==
Koh-Lanta: Pacifique season summary
Episode		Challenge winner(s)		Eliminated	
No.	Air date	Reward	Immunity	Tribe	Player
1	July 1, 2005	Kanawa	Kanawa	Kumo	Aude
1	July 1, 2005	Kanawa	Kanawa	Kumo	Mathieu
2	July 8, 2005	Kumo	Kumo	Kanawa	Francis
3	July 8, 2005	Kumo	Kanawa	Kanawa	Sylvie (Note: Evacuated.)
3	July 8, 2005	Kumo	Kanawa	Kumo	Caroline
4	July 15, 2005	Kumo	Kanawa	Kumo	Marie-Cécile
5	July 22, 2005	Kumo	Kumo	Kanawa	Éliane
6	July 29, 2005	Kumo	Kumo	Kanawa	Thierry
7	August 5, 2005	Kanawa	Mohamed	Koh-Lanta	Sakhone
8	August 12, 2005	Jérôme [Pierre]	Mohamed	Koh-Lanta	Jérôme
9	August 19, 2005	Alexis & Coumba	Mohamed	Koh-Lanta	Christine
10	August 26, 2005	Clémence	Clémence	Koh-Lanta	Coumba
11	August 30, 2005	Francis	Alexis	Koh-Lanta	Pierre
12	August 30, 2005	Francis	Mohamed	Koh-Lanta	Véronique
13	September 6, 2005	None	Mohamed, Clémence, Francis	Koh-Lanta	Alexis
13	September 6, 2005	None	Clémence	Koh-Lanta	Mohamed

== Voting history ==
	Original tribes					Switched tribes			Merged tribe							
Episode	1		2	3		4	5	6	7	8	9	10	11	12	13	
Day	3 (Note: As the Kumo tribe openly discussed for whom they were casting their vote (which is forbidden by the rules of Koh-Lanta), they were punished by voting out another member of their tribe.)		6	9		12	15	18	22	25	28	31	34	37	38	39
Tribe	Kumo	Kumo	Kanawa	Kanawa	Kumo	Kumo	Kanawa	Kanawa	Koh-Lanta	Koh-Lanta	Koh-Lanta	Koh-Lanta	Koh-Lanta	Koh-Lanta	Koh-Lanta	Koh-Lanta
Eliminated	Aude	Mathieu	Francis	Sylvie	Caroline	Marie-Cécile	Éliane	Thierry	Sakhone	Jérôme	Christine	Coumba	Pierre	Véronique	Alexis	Mohamed
Votes	7–1	4–2–1	7–1	None	4–2–1	5–2	4–2	4–1	9–2	5–4	5–3	4–2–1	4–2	4–1	None	1–0
Voter	Vote														Challenge	Vote
Clémence	Aude	Sakhone			Caroline	Marie-Cécile			Sakhone	Jérôme	Christine	Coumba	Pierre	Véronique	2nd	Mohamed
Francis			Christine				Christine	Thierry	Sakhone	Jérôme	Christine	Coumba	Pierre	Véronique	3rd	None
Mohamed	Aude	Clémence			Caroline	Marie-Cécile			Jérôme	Jérôme	Christine	Véronique	Véronique	Véronique	1st	None
Alexis	Aude	Mathieu			Marie-Cécile	Marie-Cécile			Sakhone	Jérôme	Christine	Pierre	Pierre	Véronique	4th	
Véronique			Francis				Éliane	Thierry	Sakhone	Coumba	Francis	Coumba	Pierre	Alexis		
Pierre			Francis				Éliane	Thierry	Sakhone	Coumba	Francis	Coumba	Véronique			
Coumba	Aude	Mathieu			Caroline	Marie-Cécile			Sakhone	Jérôme	Christine	Pierre				
Christine			Francis				Éliane	Thierry	Sakhone	Coumba	Francis					
Jérôme			Francis			Mohamed			Sakhone	Coumba						
Sakhone	Aude	Mathieu			Caroline	Marie-Cécile			Jérôme							
Thierry			Francis				Éliane	Francis								
Éliane			Francis				Christine									
Marie-Cécile	Aude	Mathieu			Sakhone	Mohamed										
Caroline					Sakhone											
Sylvie			Francis	Evacuated												
Mathieu	Aude	Sakhone														
Aude	Mathieu															

Jury vote
Episode	13	
Day	40	
Finalist	Clémence	Francis
Votes	7–0	
Juror	Vote	
Mohamed	Yes	
Alexis	Yes	
Véronique	Yes	
Pierre	Yes	
Coumba	Yes	
Christine	Yes	
Jérôme	Yes	

== Controversy ==
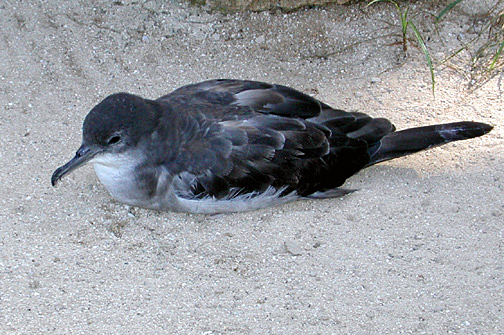
A Puffinus pacificus.

During the broadcast of the second episode (July 8, 2005 in France and July 10, 2005, in New Caledonia), participants had to kill and cook Puffinus pacificus, a species of fully protected bird in New Caledonia. This caused that several spectators demanded explanations to the TF1 channel. TF1 responded that according to the LPO (in English; League for the Protection of Birds), Puffinus pacificus are not a protected species. LPO asked the CSA (broadcasting regulator in France) to take up the case, and the latter also decided to initiate legal action against TF1 and the producer of the Adventure Line Productions program.

The petition against the production company was accepted, therefore TF1 was ordered to pay the LPO €1,000 in damages and €2,000 for procedural expenses, while the TF1 channel lawsuit against the LPO was rejected.
