= Koh-Lanta: L'Île des héros =

- Presented by: Denis Brogniart
- No. of days: 32
- No. of castaways: 20
- Winner: Naoil Tita
- Runner-up: Inès Loucif
- Location: Kadavu Group, Fiji
- No. of episodes: 15

Release
- Original network: TF1
- Original release: 21 February – 5 June 2020

Season chronology
- ← Previous; La Guerre des Chefs Next → Les 4 Terres

Koh-Lanta: L'Île des héros (transl. "Koh-Lanta: Island of Heroes") is the twenty-fourth season and the sixth special season of the French version of Survivor, Koh-Lanta. This season, for the first time in Koh-Lanta, fourteen new contestants will be playing alongside five All-Stars who have never won the game. The five All-Stars will compete in a series of challenges to join one of the two tribes. In addition, two of the new contestants were former contestants on the cancelled season in 2018. The one All-Star who fails to win the challenges will be eliminated. The season premiered on 21 February 2020.

== Contestants ==
Contestant	Original Tribe	Episode 2 Tribe	Tribe Dissolved	Episode 4 Tribe	Merged Tribe	Finish
Claudia Chatel; 21, Nancy	Nacomo					Medically evacuated Day 2
Joseph Farret; 27, Grangues	Nacomo					1st Voted Out; Day 3
Valérie Gernigon; 58, Guérande	Lawaki	Lawaki				2nd Voted Out; Day 7
Jessica Potel; Returned to Game	Héros	Héros				Lost Challenge; Day 9
Marie Ovaere; 37, Nivelles, Belgium		Nacomo	Nacomo			Medically evacuated Day 10
Teheiura Teahui; Returned to Game	Héros	Nacomo	Nacomo			3rd Voted Out; Day 10
Sara Tallon; 50, Grimaud; Malaisie & La Nouvelle Édition	Héros	Héros	Lawaki			Medically evacuated Day 13
Benoît Fourmont; 43, Marzan	Lawaki	Lawaki	Lawaki	Lawaki		4th Voted Out; Day 13
Delphine Hergault; 36, Montigny-le-Bretonneux	Nacomo	Nacomo	Nacomo	Nacomo		5th Voted Out; Day 15
Pholien Systermans; 29, Liège, Belgium	Nacomo	Nacomo	Nacomo	Nacomo	Koh-Lanta	6th Voted Out; 1st jury member Day 16
Ahmad Abadie; 30, Lyon	Nacomo	Nacomo	Nacomo	Nacomo	Koh-Lanta	7th Voted Out; 2nd jury member Day 18
Sam Haliti; 20, Pfaffenheim	Lawaki	Lawaki	Lawaki	Lawaki	Koh-Lanta	8th Voted Out; 3rd jury member Day 21
Charlotte Caron; 27, Aulnay-sous-Bois	Nacomo	Nacomo	Nacomo	Nacomo	Koh-Lanta	9th Voted Out; Evacuated from jury (Note: Charlotte had to return to France for a medical emergency. Therefore she was unable to vote at the final tribal council.); Day 24
Teheiura Teahui; 41, Cazouls-lès-Béziers; Raja Ampat, La Revanche des Héros & La Nouvelle Édition	Héros	Nacomo	Nacomo	Lawaki	Koh-Lanta	10th Voted Out; 4th jury member Day 24
Jessica Potel; 35, Soisy-sur-Seine; Johor	Héros	Héros	Nacomo	Nacomo	Koh-Lanta	11th Voted Out; 5th jury member Day 27
Éric Peyrache; 56, Monistrol-sur-Loire	Nacomo	Nacomo	Nacomo	Nacomo	Koh-Lanta	Lost Challenge; 6th jury member Day 29
Régis Rappailles; 40, Chéroy	Lawaki	Lawaki	Lawaki	Lawaki	Koh-Lanta	12th Voted Out; 7th jury member Day 30
Alexandra Leveau; 46, Saint-Malo	Lawaki	Lawaki	Lawaki	Lawaki	Koh-Lanta	Medically evacuated Evacuated from Jury (Note: Alexandra was injured at the final 5 challenge. Her injuries required her to be flown to France for medical treatment. As a result, she was unable to vote at final tribal council.); Day 31
Moussa Niangane; 38, Bagneux; Bocas del Toro & La Revanche des Héros	Héros	Lawaki	Lawaki	Lawaki	Koh-Lanta	Lost Challenge; 8th jury member Day 31
Claude Dartois; 40, Paris; Viêtnam & La Revanche des Héros	Héros	Héros	Nacomo	Nacomo	Koh-Lanta	13th Voted Out; 9th jury member Day 32
Inès Loucif; 25, Paris	Lawaki	Lawaki	Lawaki	Lawaki	Koh-Lanta	Runner-up; Day 32
Naoil Tita; 37, Antony	Lawaki	Lawaki	Lawaki	Lawaki	Koh-Lanta	Sole Survivor; Day 32

== Futures appearances ==
Teheiura returned in the third episode of Koh-Lanta: Les Armes Secrètes, after the reward challenge. The winning tribe had the occasion to spend some time in Teheiura's home in Polynesia. Sam Haliti, Teheiura Teahui and Claude Dartois returned for Koh-Lanta: La Légende. Moussa Niangane and Naoil Tita returned for Koh-Lanta: All Stars.

== Voting history ==
	Original Tribe		Episode 2 Tribe		Dissolved Tribe			Episode 4 Tribe		Merged Tribe												
►Episode	1		2	3			4		5	6		7	8 (Note: The episodes were split into two parts. Episode 8 contained the reward challenge while episode 9 contained the immunity challenge and tribal council.) & 9	10			11	12 (Note: The episodes were split into two parts. Episode 12 contained the reward challenge while episode 13 contained the immunity challenge and tribal council.) & 13		14		15
►Eliminated	Claudia	Joseph	Valérie	Jessica	Marie	Teheiura	Sara	Benoît	Delphine	Pholien		Ahmad	Sam	Charlotte		Teheiura	Jessica	Éric	Régis	Alexandra	Moussa	Claude
►Votes	0 (Note: Claudia was medically evacuated from the game.)	5-1	6-2	0 (Note: Jessica finished last at the challenge and was eliminated.)	0 (Note: Marie was medically evacuated from the game.)	6-2	0 (Note: Sara was medically evacuated from the game.)	6-1	4 (Note: The four ambassadors had to unanimously decide one contestant who would be eliminated before the merge, otherwise they'd have to draw rocks. They unanimously decided to eliminate Delphine.)	5-5-4 (Note: The vote resulted in a tie between Pholien and Éric. As a result, the contestants voted again. The penalty vote that Ahmad received in the first vote did not apply to the second.)	6-5	9-3-1	6-4-3	6-6-1 (Note: The vote resulted in a tie between Charlotte and Éric. As a result, the contestants voted again. The penalty vote against Alexandra and Éric in addition to the black vote received by Éric did not apply to the second round of voting.)	6-4	0 (Note: As Charlotte had received the most votes, Teheiura, Charlotte's partner, was also eliminated.)	6-3	0 (Note: As Éric finished last in the challenge, he was eliminated from the game.)	4-3	0 (Note: Alexandra was medically evacuated from the game.)	0 (Note: As Moussa finished last in the challenge, he was eliminated from the game.)	1
▼Contestants	Votes																					
Naoil			Valérie					Benoît		Éric	Éric	Éric	Sam	Charlotte	Charlotte		Jessica		Régis			Claude
Inès			Valérie					Benoît		Éric	Éric	Ahmad	Sam	Charlotte	Charlotte		Jessica		Alexandra			
Claude						Éric			Delphine	Pholien	Pholien	Ahmad	Charlotte	Éric	Éric		Alexandra		Régis			
Moussa			Valérie					Benoît	Delphine	Pholien	Pholien	Éric	Éric	Charlotte	Charlotte		Jessica		Alexandra			
Alexandra			Valérie					Benoît	Delphine	Éric	Pholien	Sam	Sam	Charlotte	Charlotte		Jessica		Régis			
Régis			Valérie					Benoît		Pholien	Pholien	Ahmad	Sam	Charlotte	Charlotte		Jessica		Alexandra			
Éric		Joseph				Teheiura				Ahmad	Pholien	Ahmad	Sam	Charlotte	Charlotte		Jessica					
Jessica					(Note: Jessica returned to the game as Marie's replacement after the latter was medically evacuated.)	Teheiura				Éric	Éric	Ahmad	Éric	Éric	Éric		Alexandra					
Teheiura						Éric		(Note: Teheiura returned to the game after Sara was medically evacuated.)		Pholien	Pholien	Ahmad	Charlotte	Éric	Éric							
Charlotte		Joseph				Teheiura				Ahmad	Éric	Ahmad	Sam	Éric	Éric							
Sam			Valérie					Benoît		Pholien	Pholien	Ahmad	Charlotte									
Ahmad		Joseph				Teheiura			Delphine	Éric	Pholien	Éric										
Pholien		Joseph				Teheiura				Ahmad	Éric											
Delphine		Joseph				Teheiura																
Benoît			Sam					Inès														
Sara																						
Marie		(Note: Marie arrived as Claudia's replacement at the first tribal council. As she had just joined the game, she was immune from elimination but she was not allowed to cast a vote.)																				
Valérie			Sam																			
Joseph		Delphine																				
Claudia																						
Penalty vote										Ahmad			Charlotte	Alexandra								
Penalty vote										Ahmad			Charlotte	Éric (Note: After being put into pair, Alexandra and Éric finished last in the immunity challenge. As a result, they both received a penalty vote at tribal council.)								
Black Vote												Ahmad	Éric	Éric			Alexandra		Régis			

Jury vote
Episode #	15	
Day #	32	
Finalist	Naoil	Inès
Vote	7-2	
Juror	Vote	
Claude	Naoil	
Moussa		Inès
Régis		Inès
Éric	Naoil	
Jessica	Naoil	
Teheiura	Naoil	
Sam	Naoil	
Ahmed	Naoil	
Pholien	Naoil	
