= Koh-Lanta: Panama =

- Presented by: Denis Brogniart
- No. of days: 40
- No. of castaways: 16
- Winner: Philippe Bordier
- Runner-up: Linda Alario
- Location: Archipelago de Las Perlas, Panama
- No. of episodes: 13

Release
- Original release: July 2 – August 31, 2004

Season chronology
- ← Previous; Bocas del Toro Next → Pacifique

Koh-Lanta: Panama was the fourth season of the French version of Survivor, Koh-Lanta. Like season three, this season was held in Panama but in the archipelago of Las Perlas. It was broadcast TF1 from Friday July 2, 2004 to Tuesday August 31, 2004. This season the contestants were initially divided into two tribes known as Chapera and Mogo, both of which consisted of eight contestants of the same gender. Following a tribal swap on day eight many contestants found themselves living on new tribes. Due to two evacuations that occurred this season, both Linda and Sophie returned to the game following their initial eliminations.

The winner of this season of Koh-Lanta was Philippe Bordier, who took home the prize of €100,000.

== Contestants ==
List of Koh-Lanta: Panama contestants
Contestant				Tribe			Finish		
Name	Age	Residence	Occupation	Original	Switch	Merged	Placement	Jury	Day
Mario-Nelson "Nelson" Parente	36	Grenoble	Football agent	Mogo			1st voted out		Day 4
Sophie Eeckhout (Note: Returned to game.)				Chapera			2nd voted out		Day 7
Vidéli Dittmar	44	Saint-Michel-de-Lanès	Decorative sculptor	Mogo	Mogo		Evacuated		Day 10
Sabira Lamia	23	Nozay	Computer scientist	Chapera	Mogo		3rd voted out		Day 10
Vicky Lemarié	26	Chamonix	Household appliance entrepreneur	Chapera	Chapera		4th voted out		Day 13
Jean-Bernard de Cools	54	Montastruc-la-Conseillère	Retired banking executive	Mogo	Mogo		5th voted out		Day 16
Nathalie Lapicque	28	Remiremont	Education advisor	Chapera	Chapera		6th voted out		Day 19
Guillaume Brauer	20	Toulon	Law student	Mogo	Mogo	Koh-Lanta	7th voted out		Day 22
Linda Alario (Note: Returned to game.)				Chapera	Mogo	Koh-Lanta	8th voted out		Day 25
Odile Héritier	57	Hauts-de-Seine	Actress	Chapera	Chapera	Koh-Lanta	Evacuated	1st member	Day 26
Catherine Ehret-Mader	36	Isère	Former military nurse	Chapera	Mogo	Koh-Lanta	9th voted out	2nd member	Day 28
Sophie Eeckhout	27	Montfermeil	Midwife	Chapera	Mogo	Koh-Lanta	10th voted out	3rd member	Day 31
Alban Oswald Mbossoro	27	Paris	Management student	Mogo	Chapera	Koh-Lanta	11th voted out	4th member	Day 34
Amélie Grégoire	25	Grenoble	Outdoor recreation center leader	Chapera	Chapera	Koh-Lanta	12th voted out	5th member	Day 37
Romuald Lafite	26	Caen	Fitness instructor	Mogo	Chapera	Koh-Lanta	13th voted out	6th member	Day 38
Raphaël "Dounet" Andrès	40	Épervans	Welder	Mogo	Chapera	Koh-Lanta	14th voted out	7th member	Day 40
Linda Alario	32	Alpes-Maritimes	Ready-to-wear boutique manager	Chapera	Mogo	Koh-Lanta	Runner-up		Day 40
Philippe Bordier	38	Verneugheol	Mechanic	Mogo	Mogo	Koh-Lanta	Sole survivor		Day 40

=== Future appearances ===
- Catherine Ehret-Mader, Romuald Lafite, and Philippe Bordier returned for Koh-Lanta: Le Retour des Héros, which Lafite won.
- Linda Alario returned for Koh-Lanta: Le Choc des Héros.

== Season summary ==
Koh-Lanta: Panama season summary
Episode		Challenge winner(s)		Eliminated	
No.	Air date	Reward	Immunity	Tribe	Player
1	July 2, 2004	None	Chapera	Mogo	Nelson
2	July 9, 2004	None (Note: The platform that was supposed to keep the Mogo tribe up collapsed under the weight of the castaways. Neither tribe won the challenge, but both Mogo and Chapera received a fishing kit to fix this issue.)	Mogo	Chapera	Sophie
3	July 16, 2004	Chapera	Chapera	Mogo	Vidéli (Note: Evacuated.)
3	July 16, 2004	Chapera	Chapera	Mogo	Sabira
4	July 23, 2004	Chapera	Mogo	Chapera	Vicky
5	July 30, 2004	Mogo	Chapera	Mogo	Jean-Bernard
6	August 6, 2004	Mogo	Mogo	Chapera	Nathalie
7	August 13, 2004	Mogo	Amélie	Koh-Lanta	Guillaume
8	August 13, 2004	Romuald & Sophie	Romuald	Koh-Lanta	Linda
9	August 20, 2004	Alban & Amélie	Alban	Koh-Lanta	Odile (Note: Evacuated.)
9	August 20, 2004	Alban & Amélie	Linda (Note: As part of Linda's return to the game, she was given immunity at the next Tribal Council.)	Koh-Lanta	Catherine
10	August 20, 2004	Raphaël	Raphaël	Koh-Lanta	Sophie
11	August 27, 2004	Alban [Romuald]	Romuald	Koh-Lanta	Alban
12	August 27, 2004	Amélie	Romuald	Koh-Lanta	Amélie
13	August 31, 2004	None	None	Koh-Lanta	Romuald
13	August 31, 2004	None	Linda	Koh-Lanta	Raphaël

== Voting history ==
	Original tribes		Switched tribes					Merged tribe								
Episode	1	2	3		4	5	6	7	8	9		10	11	12	13	
Day	4	7	10		13	16	19	22	25	26	28	31	34	37	38	40
Tribe	Mogo	Chapera	Mogo	Mogo	Chapera	Mogo	Chapera	Koh-Lanta	Koh-Lanta	Koh-Lanta	Koh-Lanta	Koh-Lanta	Koh-Lanta	Koh-Lanta	Koh-Lanta	Koh-Lanta
Eliminated	Nelson	Sophie	Vidéli	Sabira	Vicky	Jean-Bernard	Nathalie	Guillaume	Linda	Odile	Catherine	Sophie	Alban	Amélie	Romuald	Raphaël
Votes	4-3	5-3	None	6-1	6-1	5-1	5-1	6-2-2-1	6-3	None	6-2	4-2-1	4-2	3-2	4-1	1-0
Voter	Vote															
Philippe	Romuald			Sabira		Jean-Bernard		Catherine	Catherine		Catherine	Alban	Alban	Amélie	Romuald	None
Linda		Catherine		Sabira		Jean-Bernard		Catherine	Catherine		Catherine	Amélie	Alban	Amélie	Romuald	Raphaël
Raphaël	Romuald				Vicky		Nathalie	Guillaume	Linda		Catherine	Sophie	Alban	Linda	Romuald	None
Romuald	Nelson				Vicky		Nathalie	Guillaume	Linda		Catherine	Sophie	Linda	Amélie	Raphaël	
Amélie		Sophie			Vicky		Nathalie	Guillaume	Linda		Catherine	Sophie	Alban	Linda		
Alban	Nelson				Vicky		Nathalie	Philippe	Linda		Sophie	Sophie	Linda			
Sophie		Catherine		Sabira		Jean-Bernard		Alban	Catherine		Catherine	Alban				
Catherine		Sophie		Sabira		Jean-Bernard		Guillaume	Linda		Sophie					
Odile		Sophie			Vicky		Nathalie	Guillaume	Linda	Evacuated						
Guillaume	Nelson			Sabira		Jean-Bernard		Philippe								
Nathalie		Sophie			Vicky		Raphaël									
Jean-Bernard	Exiled (Note: Following the Immunity Challenge, Chapera won the right to select one member of Mogo to be exiled for 48 hours, choosing Jean-Bernard.)			Sabira		Linda										
Vicky		Sophie			Romuald											
Sabira		Catherine		Catherine												
Vidéli	Nelson		Evacuated													
Nelson	Romuald															
Extra vote								Guillaume (Note: As the two ambassadors for the merged tribe, Philippe and Romuald had to cast an extra vote for someone at the first post-merge Tribal Council. They chose to cast an extra vote against Guillaume.)							Romuald (Note: For coming in last place during the Orienteering challenge, Romuald received a penalty vote at the next Tribal Council.)	

Jury vote
Episode	13	
Day	40	
Finalist	Philippe	Linda
Votes	7-0	
Juror	Vote	
Raphaël	Yes	
Romuald	Yes	
Amélie	Yes	
Alban	Yes	
Sophie	Yes	
Catherine	Yes	
Odile	Yes	
