= Marion Jollès Grosjean =

French journalist and television presenter

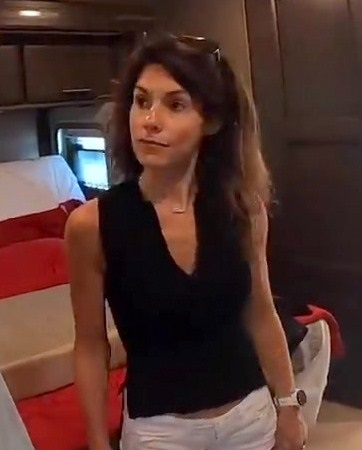
- Born: Marion Jollès; 8 December 1981 (age 44); Meaux, France
- Occupations: Sports journalist, television presenter
- Notable credit(s): Automoto; Confessions intimes
- Television: TF1 (2015–present)
- Height: 5 ft 3.75 in (1.62 m)
- Spouse: Romain Grosjean (m. 2012)
- Children: 3

Marion Jollès Grosjean (French: [maʁjɔ̃ ʒɔlɛ ɡʁoʒɑ̃]; born 8 December 1981), is a French journalist and television presenter. She has been presenting Automoto on TF1 with Denis Brogniart every Sunday morning since 2005.

== Education and early career ==
Marion Jollès was born in Saint-Étienne in the department of Loire and studied journalism in Paris. In the meantime, she did regular internships in radio working as a stringer. After graduating with a Master's degree in English, she studied for six months in Canada and then came back to France, where she graduated with a special degree (DESS) in bilingual journalism (French and English).

== Television career ==
Marion Jollès began working on the channel Eurosport. She then presented in 2005 on TF1 a short program about road safety La bonne conduite. She was also chosen the same year to present the weekly program Automoto. Since March 2009, she co-hosted the program F1 à la Une with Denis Brogniart. She also did her beginnings at the Spanish Grand Prix in Barcelona. Fluent in English and appreciated by many Formula One pilots, she was able to interview a number of them at the starting grid of the paddocks.

She presents from September 2009 to 2014 the program Confessions intimes on TF1. Since January 2010, she co-hosts L'Affiche du jour with Christian Jeanpierre, a program devoted to soccer. During the 2010 FIFA World Cup in South Africa, she hosts the program alone in studio, with Christian Jeanpierre and Arsène Wenger both on the spot via a screen. During that period, she also presented the similar evening program titled L'Affiche du soir, broadcast on the third part of the evening.

From March 2012 to June 2013, she presents the new version of Automoto on TF1 with Denis Brogniart. In December 2014, she is the substitute presenter of the results of lottery and EuroMillions, replacing the main presenters during the holiday periods of the year.

== Personal life ==
After three years of dating, Jollès married French-Swiss auto racing driver Romain Grosjean on 27 June 2012 in Chamonix, France. She added his family name to hers. They have three children, a son born on 29 July 2013, another son born on 16 May 2015, and a daughter born on 31 December 2017.

== Television programs ==
- 2005 : La bonne conduite
- 2005–present : Automoto
- 2009–12 : F1 à la une with Denis Brogniart
- 2009–14 : Confessions intimes
- 2010–present : L'Affiche du jour with Christian Jeanpierre
- 2010 : L'Affiche du soir
- 2011 : Des talents a coupé le souffle with Arthur
- 2014 : Histoire d'un rêve
- 2014–present : Loto and EuroMillions
