= Koh-Lanta: Nicoya =

- Presented by: Denis Brogniart
- No. of days: 40
- No. of castaways: 16
- Winner: Amel Fatnassi
- Runner-up: Nicolas Roy
- Location: Nicoya Peninsula, Costa Rica
- No. of episodes: 13

Release
- Original release: June 28 – September 13, 2002

Season chronology
- ← Previous; Les Aventuriers de Koh-Lanta Next → Bocas del Toro

Koh-Lanta: Nicoya was the second season of the French version of Survivor, Koh-Lanta. This season took place in Costa Rica on the island of Nicoya, and was broadcast on TF1 from June 28, 2002 to September 13, 2002 airing on Saturdays and Sundays at 6:55 p.m. The two original tribes this season were Tambor and Ventanas. As part of a special twist this season following the evacuation of Xavier in episode two, Jacky who was voted out of the Tambor tribe in the previous episode returned to the game. This season also saw the first tribal swap in the history of Koh-Lanta, in which Bernard and Jacky was sent to the Ventanas tribe.

The winner of this season of Koh-Lanta was Amel Fatnassi, who took home the prize of €100,000 after winning in a 5-2 jury vote against Nicolas Roy.

== Contestants ==
List of Koh-Lanta: Nicoya contestants
Contestant				Tribe			Finish		
Name	Age	Residence	Occupation	Original	Switch	Merged	Placement	Jury	Day
Jacky Moreau (Note: Returned to game, replacing Xavier Lemasson.)				Tambor			1st voted out		Day 4
Xavier Lemasson	29	Mornant	Physiotherapist	Tambor			Evacuated		Day 5
Caroline Lamotte	28	Paris	Commercial assistant	Ventanas			2nd voted out		Day 7
Céline Fortier	22	Toulouse	Receptionist	Ventanas			3rd voted out		Day 10
Nelly Baradeau	24	Bordeaux	Barmaid	Tambor			4th voted out		Day 13
Pierre Cambon	51	Brignoles	SME boss	Tambor			5th voted out		Day 16
Jacky Moreau	29	Lille	Butler	Tambor	Ventanas		6th voted out		Day 19
Adonis Koupaki	33	Noisy-le-Grand	Holiday center director	Ventanas			7th voted out		Day 22
Jimmy Denis	22	Paris	Fairground vendor	Tambor		Koh-Lanta	8th voted out	1st member	Day 25
Béatrice Cloix Penisson	35	Bandol	Marketing sales manager	Tambor		Koh-Lanta	9th voted out	2nd member	Day 28
François-Xavier Arguillère	25	Rueil-Malmaison	Jewelry designer	Ventanas		Koh-Lanta	10th voted out	3rd member	Day 31
Isabelle Vial	36	Nice	Pharmaceutical assistant	Ventanas		Koh-Lanta	11th voted out	4th member	Day 34
Maud Garnier	25	Nantes	Model	Tambor		Koh-Lanta	12th voted out	5th member	Day 37
Marianne Mondon	34	Mauléon-Licharre	Police officer	Ventanas		Koh-Lanta	Eliminated	6th member	Day 38
Bernard Lenoir	47	Lyon	Beautician	Ventanas	Tambor	Koh-Lanta	13th voted out	7th member	Day 39
Nicolas Roy	29	Bressuire	Agri-food team leader	Ventanas		Koh-Lanta	Runner-up		Day 40
Amel Fatnassi	28	Paris	Social worker	Tambor		Koh-Lanta	Sole survivor		Day 40

== Season summary ==
Koh-Lanta: Nicoya season summary
Episode		Challenge winner(s)		Eliminated	
No.	Air date	Reward	Immunity	Tribe	Player
1	June 28, 2002	None	Ventanas	Tambor	Jacky
2	July 5, 2002	Ventanas	Tambor	Tambor	Xavier (Note: Evacuated.)
2	July 5, 2002	Ventanas	Tambor	Ventanas	Caroline
3	July 12, 2002	Ventanas	Tambor	Ventanas	Céline
4	July 19, 2002	Ventanas	Ventanas	Tambor	Nelly
5	July 26, 2002	None	Ventanas	Tambor	Pierre
6	August 2, 2002	Ventanas	Tambor	Ventanas	Jacky
7	August 9, 2002	Ventanas	Tambor	Ventanas	Adonis
8	August 16, 2002	None	Béatrice	Koh-Lanta	Jimmy
9	August 23, 2002	Béatrice	François-Xavier	Koh-Lanta	Béatrice
10	August 30, 2002	François-Xavier & Isabelle	Nicolas	Koh-Lanta	François-Xavier
11	September 6, 2002	Marianne	Nicolas	Koh-Lanta	Isabelle
12	September 6, 2002	Bernard	Marianne	Koh-Lanta	Maud
13	September 13, 2002	None	Amel, Nicolas, Bernard	Koh-Lanta	Marianne
13	September 13, 2002	None	Amel	Koh-Lanta	Bernard

== Voting history ==
	Original tribes					Switched tribes			Merged tribe						
Episode	1	2		3	4	5	6	7	8	9	10	11	12	13	
Day	4	5	7	10	13	16	19	22	25	28	31	34	37	38	39
Tribe	Tambor	Tambor	Ventanas	Ventanas	Tambor	Tambor	Ventanas	Ventanas	Koh-Lanta	Koh-Lanta	Koh-Lanta	Koh-Lanta	Koh-Lanta	Koh-Lanta	Koh-Lanta
Eliminated	Jacky	Xavier	Caroline	Céline	Nelly	Pierre	Jacky	Adonis	Jimmy	Béatrice	François-Xavier	Isabelle	Maud	Marianne	Bernard
Votes	6-2	None (Note: Evacuated.)	7-1	4-3	4-2-1	4-2	4-1-1	4-1	5-4	5-1-1-1	4-3	5-1	3-2	None (Note: Challenge.)	1-0
Voter	Vote													Challenge	Vote
Amel	Jacky				Nelly	Pierre			Bernard	Marianne	Marianne	Isabelle	Nicolas	1st	Bernard
Nicolas			Caroline	Céline			Jacky	Adonis	Jimmy	Béatrice	François-Xavier	Isabelle	Maud	2nd	None
Bernard			Caroline	Céline		Pierre			Jimmy	Béatrice	François-Xavier	Isabelle	Maud	3rd	None
Marianne			Caroline	Céline			Jacky	Adonis	Jimmy	Béatrice	François-Xavier	Isabelle	Maud	4th	
Maud	Jacky				Pierre	Pierre			Bernard	Bernard	Marianne	Isabelle	Nicolas		
Isabelle			Caroline	Céline			Jacky	Adonis	Jimmy	Béatrice	François-Xavier	Maud			
François-Xavier			Caroline	Isabelle			Jacky	Adonis	Jimmy	Béatrice	Marianne				
Béatrice	Amel				Nelly	Pierre			Bernard	Nicolas					
Jimmy	Jacky				Nelly	Bernard			Bernard						
Adonis			Caroline	Isabelle			Isabelle	Isabelle							
Jacky	Amel				Jimmy		François-Xavier								
Pierre	Jacky				Nelly	Bernard									
Nelly	Jacky				Pierre										
Céline			Caroline	Isabelle											
Caroline			Adonis												
Xavier	Jacky	Evacuated													

Jury vote
Episode	13	
Day	40	
Finalist	Amel	Nicolas
Votes	5-2	
Juror	Vote	
Bernard		Yes
Marianne		Yes
Maud	Yes	
Isabelle	Yes	
François-Xavier	Yes	
Béatrice	Yes	
Jimmy	Yes	
