= Koh-Lanta: Viêtnam =

- Presented by: Denis Brogniart
- No. of days: 40
- No. of castaways: 18
- Winner: Philippe Duron
- Runner-up: Claude Dartois
- Location: Côn Đảo, Vietnam

Release
- Original network: TF1
- Original release: 17 September – 17 December 2010

Season chronology
- ← Previous; Le Choc des Héros Next → Raja Ampat

Koh-Lanta: Viêtnam was the tenth season of Koh-Lanta, the French version of the reality television series Survivor. The season took place in Con Dao, Vietnam. The two original tribes this season were Do and Vang. For the second time in the show, the men were the red tribe and the women were the yellow tribe. However, two contestants (Véronique and Boris) would be the only members of their gender in their tribe. The season premiered on 17 September 2010 and concluded 17 December 2010 where Philippe Duron won the season in a 6-1 jury vote against Claude Dartois to win the prize of €100,000 and the title of Sole Survivor.

== Finishing order ==
Contestant	Original Tribe	Swapped Tribe	Episode 6 Tribe	Merged Tribe	Finish
Frédérique Brugiroux; 45, Nîmes	Vang				1st Voted Out; Day 3
Vivien Escouflaire; 20, L'Isle-Adam	Do				2nd Voted Out; Day 6
Virginie Mercadal Pioli; Returned to Game	Vang	Vang			3rd Voted Out; Day 9
Alain Merdel; 47, Beauvoisin	Do	Vang			Medically evacuated Day 10
Virginie Mercadal Pioli; 38, Rocbaron	Vang	Vang			4th Voted Out; Day 12
Marine Plissonneau; Returned to Game	Vang	Vang			5th Voted Out; Day 15
Jennifer Lieutaud; 23, Marseille	Vang	Do			Left Competition; Day 15
Jean-Pierre Pigato; 48, Aix-en-Provence	Do	Vang	Vang		6th Voted Out; Day 17
Audrey Perez; 25, Saint-Just-Saint-Rambert	Vang	Do	Do		7th Voted Out; Day 20
Boris Deltell; 30, Paris	Vang	Do	Do		8th Voted Out; Day 22
Aurélie Gasser; Returned to Game	Vang	Vang	Vang	Koh-Lanta	9th Voted Out; Day 24
Valentin D'Hoore; 20, Linselles	Do	Do	Do	Koh-Lanta	Medically evacuated Day 24
Abdellah Akriche; 26, Clichy	Do	Do	Do	Koh-Lanta	10th Voted Out; 1st jury member Day 26
Marine Plissonneau; 35, Vincennes	Vang	Vang	Do	Koh-Lanta	11th Voted Out; 2nd jury member Day 29
Aurélie Gasser; 26, Longwy	Vang	Vang	Vang	Koh-Lanta	12th Voted Out; 3rd jury member Day 32
Laurence Pizzocchia; 33, Lausanne, Switzerland	Vang	Do	Do	Koh-Lanta	13th Voted Out; 4th jury member Day 35
Kunlé M'Babacéré Pakorona; 28, Chilly-Mazarin	Do	Vang	Vang	Koh-Lanta	14th Voted Out; 5th jury member Day 38
Véronique Prouteau Bègue; 55, Saint-Sardos	Do	Vang	Vang	Koh-Lanta	Lost Challenge; 6th jury member Day 39
Wafa El Mejjad; 26, Toulouse	Vang	Do	Do	Koh-Lanta	15th Voted Out; 7th jury member Day 40
Claude Dartois; 30, Paris	Do	Do	Do	Koh-Lanta	Runner-up; Day 40
Philippe Duron; 41, Romans-sur-Isère	Do	Vang	Vang	Koh-Lanta	Sole Survivor; Day 40

== Future appearances ==
Marine Plissonneau, Claude Dartois and Wafa El Mejjad later returned for Koh-Lanta: La Revanche des Héros. Laurence Pizzocchia and Philippe Duron returned for Koh-Lanta: La Nouvelle Édition. Dartois later returned for a third time for Koh-Lanta: L'Île des héros. Dartois returned for a fourth time in Koh-Lanta: La Légende.

== Challenges ==
challenge
reward		Immunity
Vang		Do
Do		Vang
Do		Do
Vang		Do
Vang	Vang	Do
Do		Do
Do		Vang
Do		Claude
Claude		Claude
Kunlé		Claude
Véronique		Philippe
Philippe		Claude
Claude		Philippe
treasure hunt challenge		perchs challenge
Claude		Philippe

== Voting History ==
	initial tribe		new tribe							merge											
	1	2	3	4		5	6		7	8		9		10	11	12	13	14		second	winner
Eliminated :	Frédérique	Vivien	Virginie	Alain	Virginie	Marine	Jennifer	Jean-Pierre	Audrey	Boris	Aurélie	Valentin	Abdellah	Marine	Aurélie	Laurence	Kunlé	Véronique	Wafa	Claude	Philippe
Votes :	8/9	8/9	4/7	0	4/7	3/6	0	3/5	5/8	2	7/9	0	6/9	5/8	5/6	3/6	3/5	0	1	1/7	6/7
Castaways	Votes																				
Philippe		Vivien	Virginie		Virginie	Marine		Jean-Pierre			Aurélie		Abdellah	Marine	Aurélie	Laurence	Kunlé		Wafa	final jury	
Claude		Vivien							Audrey	Boris	Aurélie		Abdellah	Marine	Aurélie	Véronique	Véronique			final jury	
Wafa	Frédérique								Marine		Aurélie		Abdellah	Marine	Aurélie	Laurence	Kunlé				Philippe
Véronique		Vivien	Virginie		Virginie	Marine		Jean-Pierre			Aurélie		Abdellah	Marine	(Note: at infirmary)	Wafa	Kunlé				Philippe
Kunlé		Vivien	Virginie		Virginie	Marine		Jean-Pierre		Boris	Aurélie		Abdellah	Marine	Aurélie	Laurence	Véronique			Claude	
Laurence	Frédérique								Audrey		Aurélie		Abdellah	Aurélie	Aurélie	Kunlé					Philippe
Aurélie	Frédérique		Véronique		Véronique	Jean-Pierre		Véronique			Wafa		Wafa	Wafa	Claude						Philippe
Marine	Frédérique		Véronique		Véronique	Jean-Pierre			Audrey		Philippe		Kunlé	Wafa							Philippe
Abdellah		Vivien							Valentin		Aurélie		Kunlé								Philippe
Valentin		Vivien							Audrey		(Note: at infirmary)										
Boris	Frédérique								Audrey												
Audrey	Frédérique								Marine												
Jean-Pierre		Vivien	Virginie		Virginie	Aurélie		Aurélie													
Jennifer	Frédérique																				
Virginie	Frédérique		Véronique		Véronique																
Alain		Vivien	(Note: at hospital)																		
Vivien		Véronique																			
Frédérique	Virginie																				
