= Koh-Lanta: Palau =

- No. of days: 39
- No. of castaways: 18
- Winner: Christina
- Location: Micronesia, Palau
- No. of episodes: 13

Release
- Original release: August 28 – October 30, 2009

Season chronology
- ← Previous; Le Retour des Héros Next → Le Choc des Héros

Koh-Lanta: Palau was the ninth season of the French version of the Survivor reality television franchise. This season took place on the island of Palau within Micronesia, and was broadcast on TF1 in 2009. It aired for 13 episodes on Fridays at 6:55 p.m., from 28 August 2009 to 30 October 2009.

The two original tribes this season were Koror and Mawaï. The winner of this season of Koh-Lanta was Christina who won the prize of €100,000.

== Contestants ==
Contestant	Original Tribe	Tribal Swap	Merged Tribe	Finish
Anthony Parra; Returned to game	None (Note: Anthony and Joëlle finished last in the initial challenge and were eliminated from the game.)			Eliminated; Day 1
Joëlle Bourlier; 62, Pollestres ♀	None			Eliminated; Day 1
Myriam Desvergne; 59, Montreuil ♀	None (Note: Myriam was medically evacuated from the game before the tribes were formed.)			Medically evacuated Day 2
Julien Mairesse; 25, Les Rosiers-sur-Loire ♂	Koror			1st Voted Out; Day 3
Anthony Parra; 24, Marseille ♂	Mawaï			Returned to Game; Day 3; 2nd Voted Out; Day 6
Claire Rolet; 26, Pontarlier ♀	Mawaï			3rd Voted Out; Day 9
Christina Chevry; Returned to game	Koror			4th Voted Out; Day 12
Marine Mocellin; 19, Annecy ♀	Koror	Koror		Evacuated; Day 13
Kaouther Ferdjani; 24, Paris ♀	Mawaï	Mawaï		Left Competition; Day 15
Kader Rebaï; Returned to game	Mawaï	Mawaï		6th Voted Out; Day 16
Alexandre Amico; Returned to game	Koror	Koror	Merged tribe	7th Voted Out; Day 18
Alexandre Amico; 25, Valenciennes ♂	Koror	Koror	Merged tribe	Returned to Game; Day 18; Evacuated; Day 21
Freddy Boucher; 22, Lille ♂	Koror	Mawaï	Merged tribe	8th Voted Out; Day 21
Pascal Nickert; 45, Illkirch-Graffenstaden ♂	Mawaï	Mawaï	Merged tribe	9th Voted Out; 1st Jury Member; Day 24
Louis-Laurent Léger; 27, Bures-sur-Yvette ♂	Mawaï	Koror	Merged tribe	10th Voted Out; 2nd Jury Member; Day 27
Raphaële Navarro; 27, Montpellier ♀	Koror	Koror	Merged tribe	11th Voted Out; 3rd Jury Member; Day 30
Rodolphe Assi; 52, Marseille ♂	Mawaï	Mawaï	Merged tribe	12th Voted Out; 4th Jury Member; Day 33
Kader Rebaï; 45, Cholet ♂	Mawaï	Mawaï	Merged tribe	13th Voted Out; 5th Jury Member; Day 36
Fabienne Lefebvre-Trehoux; 44, Le Rouret ♀	Mawaï	Mawaï	Merged tribe	Lost Challenge; 6th Jury Member; Day 37
Isabelle Da Silva; 37, Houilles ♀	Koror	Koror	Merged tribe	14th Voted Out; 7th Jury Member; Day 38
Patrick Merle; 39, Saint-Symphorien-de-Lay ♂	Koror	Koror	Merged tribe	Runner-Up; Day 39
Christina Chevry; 23, La Penne-sur-♙ ♀	Koror	Koror	Merged tribe	Returned to Game; Day 13; Sole Survivor; Day 39

== Future appearances ==
Freddy Boucher and Christina Chevry returned for Koh-Lanta: Le Choc des Héros. Boucher later returned for a third time, alongside Fabienne Lefebvre-Trehoux, Isabelle Da Silva and Patrick Merle for Koh-Lanta: La Revanche des Héros. Da Silva, Boucher and Chevry returned again for Koh-Lanta: La Nouvelle Édition. Raphaële Navarro returned for Koh-Lanta: Le Combat des Héros. Freddy Boucher and Patrick Merle returned again for Koh-Lanta: La Légende. In 2026, Freddy and Christina returned in Koh-Lanta: All Stars.

== Voting history ==
	Original Tribes						Tribal Swap				Merged Tribe											
Episode:	1				2	3	4	5			6	7		8	9	10	11	12	13		Reunion	
Eliminated :	Anthony; No vote	Joëlle; No vote	Myriam; No vote	Julien; 4/8 votes	Anthony; 5/8 votes	Claire; 4/7 votes	Christina; 3/7 votes	Marine; No vote	Kaouther; No vote	Kader; 4/5 votes	Alexandre; 2/2 votes	Alexandre; No vote	Freddy; 5/10 votes	Pascal; 5/9 votes	Louis-Laurent; 4/8 votes	Raphaële; 4/7 votes	Rodolphe; 4/6 votes	Kader; 3/5 votes	Fabienne; No vote	Isabelle; 1 vote	Patrick; 2/7 votes	Christina; 5/7 votes
Voter	Votes																					
Christina				Julien			Alexandre						Freddy	Pascal	Louis-Laurent	Raphaële	Rodolphe	Kader		Isabelle	Jury Vote	
Patrick				Raphaële			Christina						Freddy	Pascal	Louis-Laurent	Raphaële	Rodolphe	Fabienne			Jury Vote	
Isabelle				Julien			Raphaële				Alexandre		Freddy	Pascal	Louis-Laurent	Raphaële	Rodolphe	Kader			Patrick	
Fabienne					Anthony	Pascal				Kader	Alexandre		Isabelle	Kader	Kader	Kader	Kader	Kader				Christina
Kader					Claire	Claire				Fabienne			Freddy	Pascal	Louis-Laurent	Raphaële	Rodolphe	Fabienne			Patrick	
Rodolphe					Claire	Claire				Kader			Isabelle	Kader	Kader	Kader	Kader					Christina
Raphaële				Julien			Isabelle						Freddy	Pascal	Rodolphe	Patrick						Christina
Louis-Laurent					Anthony	Fabienne	Christina						Isabelle	Kader	Kader							Christina
Pascal					Anthony	Claire				Kader			Isabelle	Kader								Christina
Freddy				Raphaële						Kader			Isabelle									
Alexandre				Raphaële			Christina															
Kaouther					Anthony	Claire																
Marine				Julien			Raphaële															
Claire					Anthony	Pascal																
Anthony					Claire																	
Julien				Raphaële																		
Myriam																						
Joëlle																						
