= Koh-Lanta =

Television series in France

- Genre: Reality competition
- Created by: Charlie Parsons
- Presented by: Hubert Auriol (2001); Denis Brogniart (2002–)
- Theme music composer: Philippe Pelet; Olivier Perrot-Poitou
- Country of origin: France
- No. of seasons: 36 (28 + 8 special editions)

Production
- Producer: Corinne Vaillant
- Production company: Adventure Line Productions

Original release
- Network: TF1
- Release: August 4, 2001 – present

Related
- International versions

Koh-Lanta is a French reality game show based on the international Survivor format. The series premiered on August 4, 2001. The show is broadcast on TF1 and there have been 28 regular seasons and 8 special seasons. The show has been hosted by Denis Brogniart since the second season. The title of the show "Ko Lanta" (roughly translated as "the island of a million eyes") is not only a reference to the televised nature of the competition (with millions of viewers watching the show) but the title is also the name of filming location of the first season (Ko Lanta Yai, Thailand).

Following the basic premise of other international versions of the Survivor format, it features a group of contestants who are marooned in an isolated location, where they must provide food, water, fire, and shelter for themselves. The contestants compete in challenges for rewards and immunity from elimination. The contestants are progressively eliminated from the game as they are voted out by their fellow contestants until only one remains and is declared the winner and awarded the grand prize of €100,000. Since its debut in 2001, Koh-Lanta has been a huge success in France, regularly finishing first in its timeslot.

== Format and rules ==
The show follows the same general format as the other editions of the show. The players are split between two "tribes", are taken to a remote isolated location and are forced to live off the land with meagre supplies for approximately 6 weeks (3 weeks in special seasons). Frequent physical and mental challenges are used to pit the teams against each other for rewards, such as food or luxuries, or for "immunity", forcing the other tribe to attend "Tribal Council", where they must vote off one of their players.

Once about half the players are remaining, the tribes are merged into a single tribe, and competitions are on an individual basis; winning immunity prevents that player from being voted out. Most players that are voted out at this stage form the "Tribal Council Jury". Once down to two people, a final Tribal Council is held where the remaining players plead their case to the jury as to why they should win the game. The jury then decides who between the two should be considered the winner and be awarded the grand prize of €100,000, with the runner-up being awarded €10,000.

=== Differences in format ===
Unlike most versions of Survivor, dual winners are possible in some seasons where the jury vote resulted in a tie (as occurred in Koh-Lanta: Bocas del Toro, Koh-Lanta: Palawan and Koh-Lanta: The Cursed Totem). In this case both contestants are considered the winners, with the winners and runner-up prizes equally divided between the pair, and both receive €55,000. This differs from most editions of the show as other editions will either never have a jury with an even number of participants or have tie-breaker mechanisms in place (such as Israeli Survivor where the tie will break in favor of the winner of a public vote or in Dutch/Belgian's Expeditie Robinson where a group of former players form a "grand jury" and vote to break the tie).

Another difference in rules between Koh-Lanta and other editions is how the unexpected eliminations are handled. On Koh-Lanta, when a player is eliminated from the game outside of "Tribal Council" (either by being removed for medical reasons, or quitting prior to Raja Ampat), the player is replaced by the most recently eliminated player (or, if no such player is available, by a completely new contestant), who will take their place and the game continues as planned. In other editions, an unexpected elimination is handled by adjusting the events of the game to accommodate the absence of a player (often the upcoming Tribal Council will be cancelled but this will not always be the case).

== Seasons ==
List of Koh-Lanta seasons
No.	Season	Season premiere	Season finale	Location	Days	Initial tribes	Winner	Runner-up	Final vote
1	The Adventurers of Koh-Lanta	August 4, 2001	September 22, 2001	Ko Lanta Yai, Thailand	43	Two predetermined tribes of eight.	Gilles Nicolet	Guénaëlle Biras	4-3
2	Koh-Lanta: Nicoya	June 28, 2002	September 13, 2002	Nicoya Peninsula, Costa Rica	40	Two predetermined tribes of eight.	Amel Fatnassi	Nicolas Roy	5-2
3	Koh-Lanta: Bocas del Toro	June 6, 2003	August 29, 2003	Bocas del Toro, Panama	40	Two tribes of eight, picked by the oldest contestants.	Isabelle Seguin & Delphine Bano		3-3
4	Koh-Lanta: Panama	July 2, 2004	August 31, 2004	Pearl Islands, Panama	40	Two tribes of eight, divided by gender	Philippe Bordier	Linda Alario	7-0
5	Koh-Lanta: Pacific	July 1, 2005	September 6, 2005	Isle of Pines, New Caledonia	40	Two tribes of eight, based on age.	Clémence Castel	Francis Bordas	7-0
6	Koh-Lanta: Vanuatu	July 21, 2006	September 5, 2006	Efate, Vanuatu	40	Two tribes of eight, based on age.	François-David Cardonnel	Émilie Frahi	5-3
7	Koh-Lanta: Palawan	June 29, 2007	September 11, 2007	Palawan, Philippines	40	Two tribes of eight, picked by winners of the initial challenge.	Jade Handi & Kevin Cuoco		3-3
8	Koh-Lanta: Caramoan	July 4, 2008	September 20, 2008	Caramoan, Philippines	39	Two tribes of eight, picked by winners of the initial challenge.	Christelle Gauzet	Frédéric "Fred" Favier	6-1
9	Koh-Lanta: Palau	August 28, 2009	October 30, 2009	Koror, Palau	39	Two tribes of eight, picked by the oldest and youngest player. Two players eliminated at the first challenge.	Christina Chevry	Patrick Merle	5-2
10	Koh-Lanta: Vietnam	September 17, 2010	December 17, 2010	Con Dao, Vietnam	40	Two tribes of nine, divided by gender.	Philippe Duron	Claude Dartois	6-1
11	Koh-Lanta: Raja Ampat	September 9, 2011	December 16, 2011	Raja Ampat, Indonesia	41	Two predetermined tribes of ten.	Gérard Urdampilleta	Teheiura Teahui	7-2
12	Koh-Lanta: Malaysia	November 2, 2012	February 1, 2013	Seribuat, Malaysia	42	Two tribes of eight, picked by winners of initial challenge. Four non-picked players exiled until after the next reward challenge.	Ugo Lartiche	Brice Martinet	10-1
13	Koh-Lanta 13	Unaired		Koh Rong, Cambodia	Cancelled				
14	Koh-Lanta: Johor	April 24, 2015	July 24, 2015	Sibu Island, Malaysia	40	Two tribes of ten, picked by finder of hidden message and second player of his choice.	Marc Rambaud	Chantal Ménard	9-2
15	Koh-Lanta: Thailand	February 12, 2016	May 27, 2016	Ko Yao, Thailand	40	Two tribes of nine, picked by the youngest contestants. Two other players exiled until after the first Tribal Council.	Wendy Gervois	Pascal Salviani	6-5
16	Koh-Lanta: Island of Treasure	August 26, 2016	December 9, 2016	Koh Rong, Cambodia	42	Two tribes of ten, picked by the winner of an initial challenge and second player of his choice.	Benoît Assadi	Jesta Hillmann	10-0
17	Koh-Lanta: Cambodia	March 10, 2017	June 16, 2017	Koh Rong, Cambodia	40	Three predetermined tribes of six. One additional player added to each tribe on day four.	Frédéric Blancher	Clémentine Jullien	6-2
18	Koh-Lanta: Fiji	September 1, 2017	December 15, 2017	Yasawa Islands, Fiji	41	Two tribes of ten, based on age.	André Deleplace	Tiffany Gounin	8-1
19	Koh-Lanta 19	Unaired		Kadavu Group, Fiji	Cancelled				
20	Koh-Lanta: Chiefs at War	15 March 2019	21 June 2019	Kadavu Group, Fiji	39	Three tribes of seven picked by the three new chiefs who won the pole challenge at the beginning	Maud Bamps	Cindy Poumeyrol	7-6
21	Koh-Lanta: The Four Lands	28 August 2020	4 December 2020	Kadavu Group, Fiji	40	Four tribes of six, divided by geography of player's hometown (North, South, East, West)	Alexandra Pornet	Brice Petit	7-5
22	Koh-Lanta: The Secret Weapons	12 March 2021	4 June 2021	Taha'a, French Polynesia	35	Two tribes picked by the two winning pairs of the initial challenge. One additional player later joins one tribe on day five.	Maxine Eouzan	Lucie Bertaud	9-4
23	Koh-Lanta: The Cursed Totem	22 February 2022	21 June 2022	El Nido, Palawan, Philippines	39	Three tribes randomly drawn.	Bastien San Pedro & François Descamp	Géraldine Nicolle	4-4-3
24	Koh-Lanta: The Sacred Fire	21 February 2023	13 June 2023	Caramoan, Philippines	40	Two tribes of ten randomly drawn based on where they stood on marooning.	Frédéric Khouvilay	Tania Čakarević	7-2
25	Koh-Lanta: The Immunity Hunters	13 February 2024	4 June 2024	Caramoan, Philippines	38	Two predetermined tribes of ten. One additional player for each tribe on day four after reward challenge.	Léa Sahin	Meïssa Seck	8-3
26	Koh-Lanta: The Cursed Tribe	20 August 2024	3 December 2024	Caramoan, Philippines	41	Two tribes of 10, 9 new players picked and captained by two former winners. The "Cursed Tribe" is the third tribe of four new players, who lost and opening challenge and will compete to swap places with players on the main tribes.	Thibault Bélanger	Charlotte Rasquin	9-4
27	Koh-Lanta: Revenge of the Four Lands	25 February 2025	24 June 2025	Caramoan, Philippines	40	Four tribes of six, divided by geography of player's hometown (North, South, East, West)	Gaëlle Fleury	Maël Lozac'h	7-4
28	Koh-Lanta: The Relics of Destiny	3 March 2026	23 June 2026	Caramoan, Philippines	40	Two tribes of ten contestants divided by schoolyard pick after spending the first night together on one beach.	Cynthia Combes	Clarisse Cresseveur	10-3

List of Koh-Lanta special seasons
No.	Season	Season premiere	Season finale	Location	Days	Initial tribes	Winner	Runner-up	Final vote
1	Koh-Lanta: Return of the Heroes	January 13, 2009	February 13, 2009	Rio Negro, Amazonas, Brazil	21	Two tribes of six former players, based on a draw. Two players eliminated in initial challenge.	Romuald Lafite	Jade Handi	5-2
2	Koh-Lanta: Clash of the Heroes	March 26, 2010	May 21, 2010	Poum, New Caledonia	20	Two tribes of six, former players against famous sportspeople. One additional player added to each tribe on day 4.	Grégoire Delachaux	Freddy Boucher	6-2
3	Koh-Lanta: Revenge of the Heroes	April 8, 2012	June 1, 2012	Koh Rong, Cambodia	23	Two predetermined tribes of eight former players.	Bertrand Bolle	Claude Dartois	9-1
4	Koh-Lanta: The New Edition	September 12, 2014	November 21, 2014	Sibu Island, Malaysia	23	Two tribes of six former players. Tribes formed after first Tribal Council by two latecomers.	Laurent Maistret	Martin Bazin	7-0
5	Koh-Lanta: The Combat of Heroes	16 March 2018	25 May 2018	Yasawa Islands, Fiji	32	Two predetermined tribes of nine former players.	Clémence Castel	Pascal Salviani	5-4
6	Koh-Lanta: Island of Heroes	21 February 2020	5 June 2020	Kadavu Group, Fiji	32	Two tribes of seven new players. Five returning players compete in challenges to each join one of the two tribes (only four of them will join the tribes)	Naoil Tita	Inès Loucif	7-2
7	Koh-Lanta: The Legend	24 August 2021	14 December 2021	Taha'a, French Polynesia	36	Two tribes of ten former players separated by gender - in which they competed individually among themselves.	~~Claude Dartois~~	~~Laurent Maistret~~	~~9-4~~
8	Koh-Lanta: All Stars	25 August 2026	17 November 2026	Pearl Islands, Panama	32	Eighteen returning players begin the game in tied destinies with a contestant they played during with during their previous season.	Lola Labesse	Freddy Boucher	6-3

== Controversy ==
=== Season 5 controversy ===
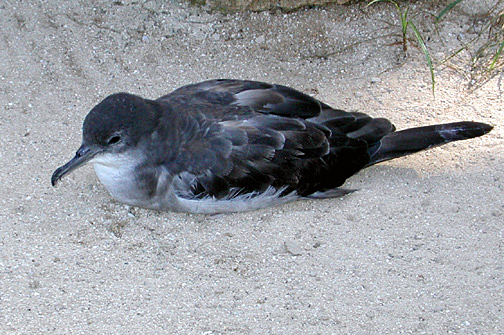
A wedge-tailed shearwater.

During the broadcast of the second episode of the fifth season (July 8, 2005 in France and July 10, 2005 in New Caledonia), participants had to kill and cook wedge-tailed shearwaters, a fully-protected bird species in New Caledonia. This caused several spectators to demand explanations from the TF1 channel. TF1 responded that according to the LPO (in English, League for the Protection of Birds), wedge-tailed shearwater are not a protected species. LPO asked the CSA (broadcasting regulator in France) to take up the case, and the latter also decided to initiate legal action against TF1 and the producer of the Adventure Line Productions program.

The petition against the production company was accepted, therefore TF1 was ordered to pay the LPO €1,000 in damages and €2,000 for procedural expenses, while the TF1 channel lawsuit against the LPO was rejected.

=== Season 13 cancellation ===
Production for the 2013 season was cancelled following the death of a contestant, Gérald Babin, during the first day of filming in Cambodia on 22 March 2013. Babin had collapsed and was initially taken to a local infirmary before being transferred by airlift to a hospital. The production company Adventure Line Productions and host Denis Brogniart denied that Babin’s treatment had been delayed because of shooting and said the production had nothing to do with his death. The program's on-site doctor, Thierry Costa, committed suicide following the controversy. Production later resumed for Koh-Lanta: The New Edition.

The death of Babin marked the second death of a contestant on any edition of Survivor worldwide. The first (and so far only other) death occurred on the fourth season of Bulgarian Survivor (titled Survivor BG: Philippines), when contestant Noncho Vodenicharov died; however, unlike Koh-Lanta, the production of the season continued.

=== Season 19 cancellation ===
On 11 May 2018, TF1 and the production company Adventure Line Productions (ALP) announced the cancellation of the season following an alleged sexual assault.

== See also ==
- List of French adaptations of television series from other countries
