= Koh-Lanta season 1 =

Koh-Lanta
- Season 1
- Presented by: Hubert Auriol
- No. of days: 43
- No. of castaways: 16
- Winner: Gilles Nicolet
- Runner-up: Guénaëlle Biras
- Location: Koh Rok Island, Thailand
- No. of episodes: 13

Release
- Original release: August 4 – September 22, 2001

Season chronology
- Next → Nicoya

Les Aventuriers de Koh-Lanta was the first season of the French version of Survivor, titled Koh-lanta. This season took place in Thailand on the island of Koh Rok, and was broadcast on TF1 from August 4, 2001 to September 22, 2001 airing on Saturdays and Sundays at 6:55 p.m.

The winner of this season of Koh-lanta was Gilles, who took home the prize of €100,000.

== Contestants ==
List of Les Aventuriers de Koh-Lanta contestants
Contestant				Tribe		Finish		
Name	Age	Residence	Occupation	Original	Merged	Placement	Jury	Day
Marie Besnier	22	Saint-Marcellin	Communications student	Lanta-Naï		1st voted out		Day 3
Guillaume Noël	24	Saint-Brieuc	Car salesman	Korok		2nd voted out		Day 6
Jean-Luc Florina	50	Toulon	Retired naval officer	Lanta-Naï		3rd voted out		Day 10
Gaël Gallen	18	Brest	Management student	Korok		4th voted out		Day 13
Harry Levy	44	Marseille	Dental technician	Korok		5th voted out		Day 16
Sandra Acabado	19	Athis-Mons	Foreign language student	Lanta-Naï		6th voted out		Day 19
David Noël	24	Estérençuby	Musician	Lanta-Naï	Koh-Lanta	7th voted out		Day 22
Stéphane Bertheau	24	Nanterre	Graduate in town planning	Lanta-Naï	Koh-Lanta	8th voted out	1st member	Day 25
Géraldine Doyen	27	Avignon	Temporary employment in insurance	Lanta-Naï	Koh-Lanta	9th voted out	2nd member	Day 30
Michèle Valembois	58	Toulon-sur-Allier	Pensioner	Korok	Koh-Lanta	10th voted out	3rd member	Day 33
William Lecomte	32	Tours	Postgraduate student	Korok	Koh-Lanta	11th voted out	4th member	Day 36
Françoise Avignon	41	Arras	Municipal employee	Lanta-Naï	Koh-Lanta	12th voted out	5th member	Day 40
Romain Bissol	27	Vigneux-sur-Seine	Electrician	Korok	Koh-Lanta	Eliminated	6th member	Day 41
Patricia Tanguy	31	La Garenne-Colombes	Executive secretary	Korok	Koh-Lanta	13th voted out	7th member	Day 42
Guénaëlle Biras	25	Paris	Graphic designer	Korok	Koh-Lanta	Runner-up		Day 43
Gilles Nicolet	35	Bordeaux	Freelance writer	Lanta-Naï	Koh-Lanta	Sole survivor		Day 43

== Season summary ==
Les Aventuriers de Koh-Lanta season summary
Episode		Challenge winner(s)		Eliminated	
No.	Air date	Reward	Immunity	Tribe	Player
1	August 4, 2001	None	Korok	Lanta-Naï	Marie
2	August 5, 2001	Lanta-Naï	Lanta-Naï	Korok	Gillaume
3	August 11, 2001	Korok	Korok	Lanta-Naï	Jean-Luc
4	August 12, 2001	Lanta-Naï	Lanta-Naï	Korok	Gaël
5	August 18, 2001	Lanta-Naï	Lanta-Naï	Korok	Harry
6	August 19, 2001	Lanta-Naï	Korok	Lanta-Naï	Sandra
7	August 25, 2001	None	William	Koh-Lanta	David
8	August 26, 2001	Françoise	William	Koh-Lanta	Stéphane
9	September 1, 2001	Gilles	Michèle	Koh-Lanta	Geraldine
10	September 2, 2001	Romain	Gilles	Koh-Lanta	Michèle
11	September 8, 2001	William	Guénaëlle	Koh-Lanta	William
12	September 15, 2001	Guénaëlle	Gilles	Koh-Lanta	Françoise
13	September 22, 2001	None	Gilles, Guénaëlle, Patricia	Koh-Lanta	Romain
13	September 22, 2001	None	Gilles	Koh-Lanta	Patricia

== Voting history ==
	Original tribes						Merged tribe							
Episode	1	2	3	4	5	6	7	8	9	10	11	12	13	
Day	3	6	10	13	16	19	22	25	30	33	36	40	41	42
Tribe	Lanta-Naï	Korok	Lanta-Naï	Korok	Korok	Lanta-Naï	Koh-Lanta	Koh-Lanta	Koh-Lanta	Koh-Lanta	Koh-Lanta	Koh-Lanta	Koh-Lanta	Koh-Lanta
Eliminated	Marie	Guillaume	Jean-Luc	Gaël	Harry	Sandra	David	Stéphane	Géraldine	Michèle	William	Françoise	Romain	Patricia
Votes	6-1-1	4-3-1	5-1-1	4-3	4-2	4-2	6-5	5-3-1	7-1	4-3	4-2	3-2	None (Note: The contestant who placed last in the challenge was automatically eliminated.)	1-0
Voter	Vote												Challenge	Vote
Gilles	Marie		Jean-Luc			Sandra	Michèle	Romain	Géraldine	William	William	Romain	1st	Patricia
Guénaëlle		Michèle		Gaël	Harry		David	Stepháne	Géraldine	Michèle	William	Françoise	2nd	None
Patricia		Michèle		Gaël	Harry		David	Stepháne	Géraldine	Michèle	William	Françoise	3rd	None
Romain		Harry		Gaël	Harry		David	Stepháne	Géraldine	Michèle	Gilles	Françoise	4th	
Françoise	Marie		Sandra			Sandra	Michèle	Michèle	Géraldine	William	William	Romain		
William		Guillaume		Michèle	Patricia		David	Stéphane	Géraldine	Michèle	Gilles			
Michèle		Guillaume		Gaël	Harry		David	Stéphane	Géraldine	William				
Géraldine	Marie		Jean-Luc			Françoise	Michèle	Michèle	Romain					
Stéphane	Marie		Jean-Luc			Sandra	Michèle	Michèle						
David	Marie		Jean-Luc			Sandra	Michèle							
Sandra	Marie		Jean-Luc			Françoise								
Harry		Guillaume		Michèle	Patricia									
Gaël		Guillaume		Michèle										
Jean-Luc	Sandra		Françoise											
Guillaume		Michèle												
Marie	Gilles													
Ambassadors							David							

Jury vote
Episode	13	
Day	43	
Finalist	Gilles	Guénaëlle
Votes	4-3	
Juror	Vote	
Patricia		Yes
Romain		Yes
Françoise	Yes	
William		Yes
Michèle	Yes	
Géraldine	Yes	
Stéphane	Yes	

== Ratings ==
Episode	Date	Viewers	Rating Share
1	Saturday, August 4, 2001	4 200 000	38,6%
2	Sunday, August 5, 2001	4 500 000	40,0%
3	Saturday, August 11, 2001	3 500 000	37,2%
4	Sunday, August 12, 2001	4 100 000	41,5%
5	Saturday, August 18, 2001	4 000 000	35,0%
6	Sunday, August 19, 2001	5 700 000	44,0%
7	Saturday, August 25, 2001	3 900 000	38,5%
8	Sunday, August 26, 2001	4 800 000	44,5%
9	Saturday, September 1, 2001	4 600 000	39,5%
