= Denis Brogniart =

French sport journalist and television host (born 1967)

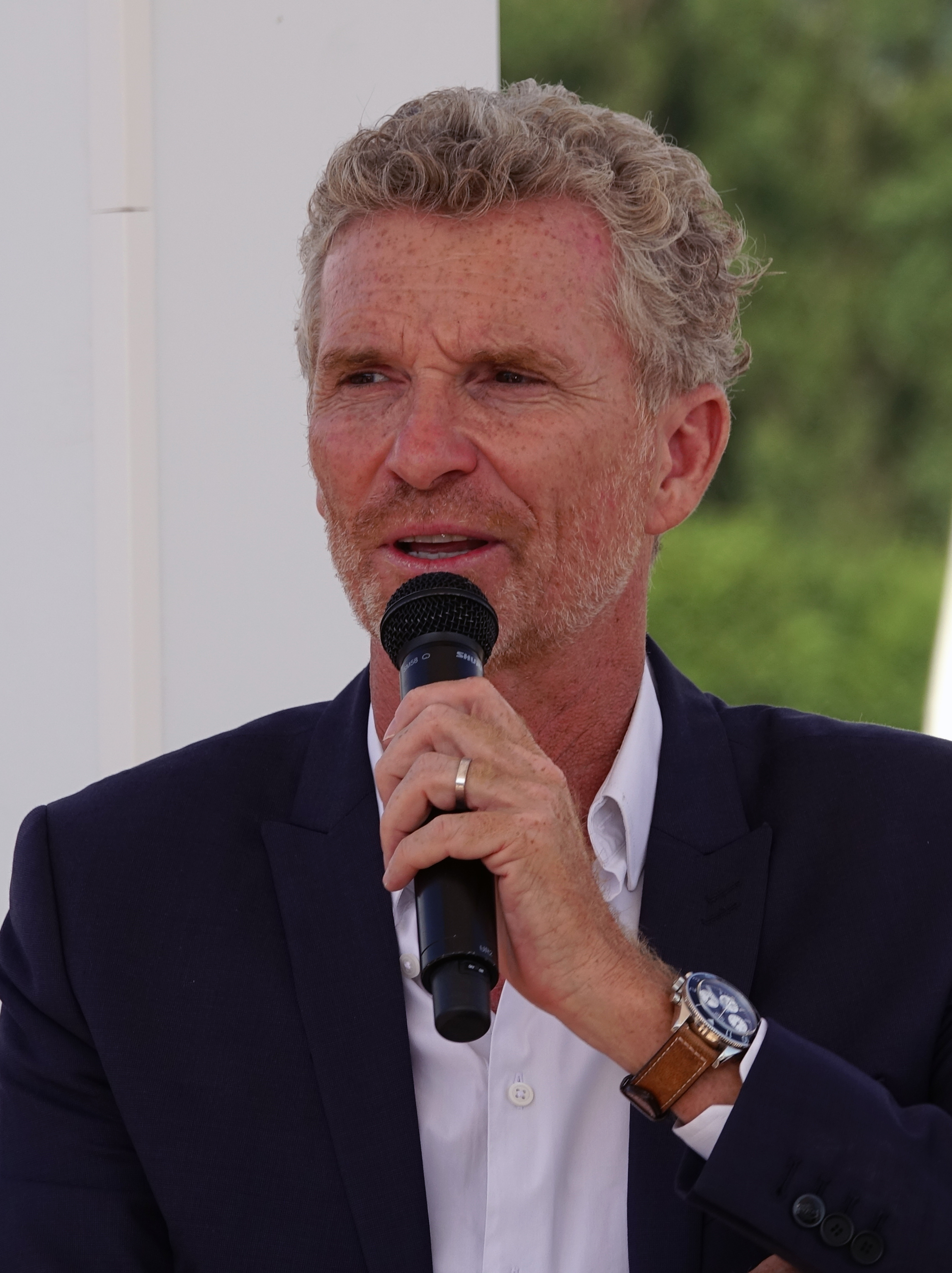
- Brogniart in 2019
- Born: 12 June 1967 (age 57); Dijon, France
- Occupation: Television host

Denis Brogniart (French: [dəni bʁɔɲaʁ]; born 12 June 1967 in ) is a French sport journalist and television host. He presents the show Koh-Lanta since 2002 and Formula One racing on TF1 with Marion Jollès Grosjean.

== Personal life ==
Denis Brogniart was born on 12 June 1967, in Dijon. His mother was a professor of mathematics and his father was a banking executive and held a doctorate in law. He has two brothers: François and Gilles Brogniart.

After a scientific baccalaureate at the Lycée Louis Pergaud in Besançon, he tried for a year and a half to go to medical school. He gave up and started working as a lifeguard and animator at Club Med in Spain and as an SB instructor in Port-des-Barques (with the city of Chennevières). He is in charge of the animation of the pool games2. At the same time, he is studying to become a teacher of physical education and sports. After graduating from the University of Caen Basse-Normandie, he entered the Institut pratique de journalisme (IPJ) in Paris1. His dream has always been to work as a sports journalist.

Married in 2007 with Hortense, Brogniart has four children (born between 2000 and 2007) including three with his current wife. He had twin sisters Lili and Violette, and a son named Dimitri. He has two brothers, one named Francis. His mother is a mathematics teacher and his father works in a bank.

== Humanitarian and solidarity commitments ==
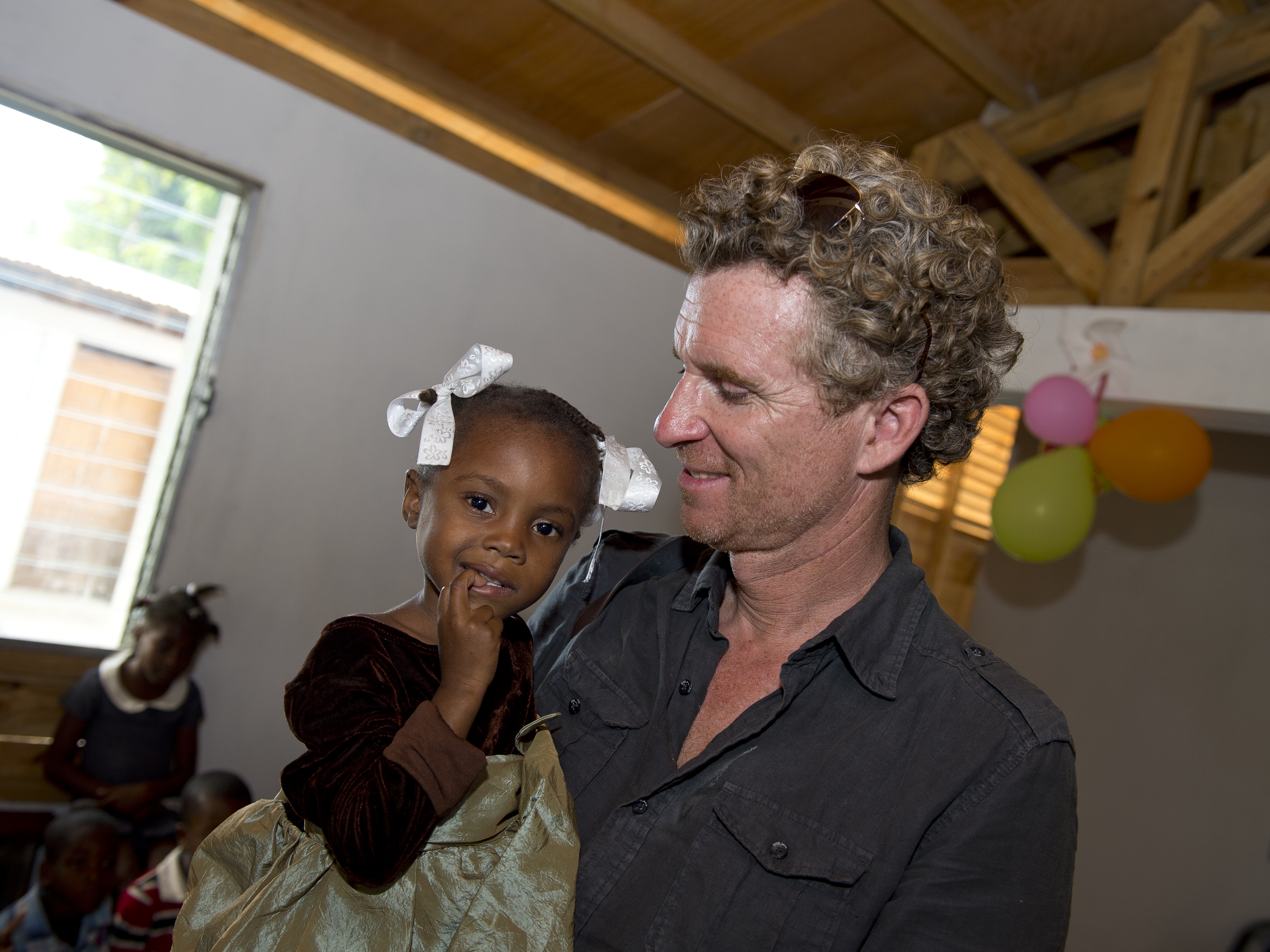
Brogniart during a visit to an orphanage in Haiti, 2012

Since 2010, Brogniart has been supporting the Foundation of Emergency Architects, of which he has become the sponsor.

Emergency Architects whose purpose is to assist populations affected by natural or human disasters around the world, and who rebuild homes, schools or infrastructure to enable the poorest to regain decent living conditions as soon as possible after a disaster.

For the past two years, he has been the godfather of the war wounded of CABAT, the Army's Wounded Aid Cell. (source: Mindef - CABAT)

Brogniart has also made several trips to the Foundation's activities, in Haiti for example, to testify and put his reputation at the service of this cause.

Since the beginning of 2018, Brogniart has been an ambassador for the ARC Foundation for Cancer Research. He will also be the sponsor of the 5th edition of the Triathlon des Roses, dedicated to breast cancer research.

== Legacy ==
=== Internet parodies ===
Koh-Lanta: Viêtnam episode depicting Brogniart saying his interjection to an answer to Laurence became an Internet meme after numerous parodies were posted to the internet.

In 2017, Brogniart became an Internet meme due to his interjection during the first episode of Koh-Lanta: Viêtnam aired in September 2010, after Denis asked another contestant, Laurence Pizzocchia what they could do if many men were featured and Laurence answered "they can build a cabin". The interjection has been used on many forums, YouTube poops or remixes such as Khaled Freak.

Brogniart has made many appearances in other media with Huffington Post and Cyprien for explaining his interjection.

French-Belgian actor Franck Dacquin reused this interjection twice for the Bluey character Bandit Heeler in the French version of Hotel when Bluey (French: Nina Ringelheim) asks his dad to "push the bell", and might one of many people refers to Brogniart thanks of his reaction face.

=== Popular culture ===
In October 2022, a statue depicting Brogniart was entered into the Musée Grévin wax museum in Paris.

== TV career ==
- 2001: Les Aventuriers de Koh-Lanta (narrator, Thaïlande)
- 2002: Les Aventuriers de Koh-Lanta (Costa Rica)
- 2003: Fear Factor
- 2003: Koh-Lanta (Panama)
- 2004:
  - Koh-Lanta (Panama)
  - F1 à la Une
- 2005:
  - Koh-Lanta (Nouvelle-Calédonie)
  - L'Île de la tentation
- 2006: Koh-Lanta (Vanuatu)
- 2007: Koh-Lanta (Philippines)
- 2008:
  - Auto Critiques and Moto Critiques, on Eurosport France
  - Téléfoot
  - Euro 2008: Le mag
  - Koh-Lanta (Philippines)
  - Qui peut battre Benjamin Castaldi ?
  - Domino Day
- 2009: Koh-Lanta : le retour des héros
