= Koh-Lanta: La Revanche des 4 Terres =

Season of Koh-Lanta

- Season 27
- Presented by: Denis Brogniart
- No. of days: 40
- No. of castaways: 24
- Winner: Gaëlle Fleury
- Runner-up: Maël Lozac'h
- Location: Caramoan, Philippines
- No. of episodes: 17

Release
- Original network: TF1
- Original release: 25 February – 24 June 2025

Season chronology
- ← Previous; La Tribu Maudite Next → Les Reliques du Destin

Koh-Lanta: La Revanche des 4 Terres (transl. "Koh-Lanta: The Revenge of the Four Lands") is the twenty-seventh regular season and the thirty-second season overall of the French reality television series Koh-Lanta. The season bring backs the four tribes previously seen in Les 4 Terres with four tribes of six compromising of the different regions of France. The contestants compete for 40 days in Caramoan, Philippines to compete for €100,000. The season premiered on TF1 on 25 February 2025. The season concluded on 24 June 2025 where Gaëlle Fleury won against Maël Lozac'h in a 7-4 jury vote to win the grand prize of the tile of Sole Survivor.

== Contestants ==
The season includes Allan Rousseeuw who is the son of Koh-Lanta: Cambodge contestant Marjorie Rousseeuw.

List of Koh-Lanta: La Revanche des 4 Terres contestants
| Contestant | Original Tribe | Episode 3 Tribe | Episode 5 Tribe | Merged Tribe | Finish |
|---|---|---|---|---|---|
| Cynthiana Steinbach; 39, Saint-Étienne-de-Tulmont | Kanluran | | | | 1st Voted Out; Day 3 |
| Mehdi Bounab-Lamiral; Returned to Game | Kanluran | | | | 2nd Voted Out; Day 5 |
| Allan Rousseeuw; 25, Dunkirk | Ilaga | | | | Medically evacuated Day 6 |
| Christian Chambon; 63, La Barre | Silangan | Silangan | | | 3rd Voted Out; Day 8 |
| Romane Ouvrard; 20, Nantes | Kanluran | Kanluran | | | 4th Voted Out; Day 10 |
| Mehdi Bounab-Lamiral; 27, Villeneuve-sur-Lot | Kanluran | Ilaga | | | Quit; Day 11 |
| Benoît Piedfer; 24, Clermont-Ferrand | Silangan | Silangan | | | 5th Voted Out; Day 11 |
| Mohamed Ayari; 30, Roubaix | Ilaga | Ilaga | Tugawe | | 6th Voted Out; Day 14 |
| Pauline Leperchois; 39, Alata | Timog | Timog | Virak | | 7th Voted Out; Day 16 |
| Andréa Aladin; 24, Orléans | Ilaga | Ilaga | Virak | | 8th Voted Out; Day 19 |
| Maxime Lubian; Returned to Game | Silangan | Silangan | Virak | | Eliminated; Removed from Jury; Day 22 |
| Adrien Bernaert; 23, Aix-en-Provence | Timog | Timog | Tugawe | Koh-Lanta | 9th Voted Out; Evacuated from Jury; Day 23 |
| Frédéric Pignard; 56, Saint-Thibault-des-Vignes | Ilaga | Ilaga | Tugawe | Koh-Lanta | Medically evacuated Evacuated from Jury; Day 25 |
| Jessica Murcia; 38, Gémenos | Timog | Timog | Tugawe | Koh-Lanta | Lost Challenge; 1st Jury Member; Day 26 |
| Louise Rose Picavet; 24, Grenoble | Silangan | Silangan | Virak | Koh-Lanta | 10th Voted Out; 2nd Jury Member; Day 26 |
| Joana Callico; 32, Coubron | Ilaga | Ilaga | Virak | Koh-Lanta | 11th Voted Out; 3rd Jury Member; Day 29 |
| Naïs Napoletano; 25, Marseille | Timog | Timog | Tugawe | Koh-Lanta | 12th Voted Out; 4th Jury Member; Day 32 |
| Pierre-Marie Ponsot; 39, La Roche-de-Glun | Timog | Timog | Virak | Koh-Lanta | Eliminated; 5th Jury Member; Day 32 |
| Maxime Lubian; 33, Thaon-les-Vosges | Silangan | Silangan | Virak | Koh-Lanta | Lost Challenge; 6th Jury Member; Day 33 |
| Noémie Bessec; 32, Saint-Malo | Kanluran | Kanluran | Tugawe | Koh-Lanta | 13th Voted Out; 7th Jury Member; Day 35 |
| Céline Faccio; 39, Peisey-Nancroix | Silangan | Silangan | Tugawe | Koh-Lanta | 14th Voted Out; 8th Jury Member; Day 38 |
| Jérôme Salvatore (Note: Referred to as "Jérôme des Landes" or "Jérôme de l'Ouest", in order to avoid confusion with Jérôme M.); 52, Tarnos | Kanluran | Kanluran | Virak | Koh-Lanta | Lost Challenge; 9th Jury Member; Day 39 |
| Claire Passas; 37, Le Perreux-sur-Marne | Ilaga | Ilaga | Virak | Koh-Lanta | Lost Challenge; 10th Jury Member; Day 39 |
| Jérôme Molas (Note: Referred to as "Jérôme le Catalan" or "Jérôme du Sud", in order to avoid confusion with Jérôme S.); 43, Arles-sur-Tech | Timog | Timog | Virak | Koh-Lanta | 15th Voted Out; 11th Jury Member; Day 40 |
| Maël Lozac'h; 27, Fouesnant | Kanluran | Kanluran | Tugawe | Koh-Lanta | Runner-up; Day 40 |
| Gaëlle Fleury; 34, Groslée-Saint-Benoît | Silangan | Silangan | Tugawe | Koh-Lanta | Sole Survivor; Day 40 |

== Challenges ==
| Episode | Air date | Challenges | | Eliminated | Vote | Finish |
| Episode | Air date | Reward | Immunity | Eliminated | Vote | Finish |
|---|---|---|---|---|---|---|
| Episode 1 | 25 February 2025 | Timog | Timog | Cynthiana | 4-1-1 | 1st Voted Out; Day 3 |
| Episode 1 | 25 February 2025 | Ilaga | Ilaga | Cynthiana | 4-1-1 | 1st Voted Out; Day 3 |
| Episode 1 | 25 February 2025 | Silangan | Silangan | Cynthiana | 4-1-1 | 1st Voted Out; Day 3 |
| Episode 2 | 4 March 2025 | Kanluran | Ilaga | Mehdi | 4-1 | 2nd Voted Out; Day 6 |
| Episode 2 | 4 March 2025 | Silangan | Silangan | Mehdi | 4-1 | 2nd Voted Out; Day 6 |
| Episode 2 | 4 March 2025 | Timog | Timog | Mehdi | 4-1 | 2nd Voted Out; Day 6 |
| Episode 3 | 11 March 2025 | Silangan | Ilaga | Allan | 0 | Medically evacuated Day 6 |
| Episode 3 | 11 March 2025 | Kanluran | Timog | Allan | 0 | Medically evacuated Day 6 |
| Episode 3 | 11 March 2025 | Timog | Kanluran | Christian | 5-1 | 3rd Voted Out; Day 8 |
| Episode 4 | 18 March 2025 | Silangan | Ilaga | Romane | 3-1 | 4th Voted Out; Day 10 |
| Episode 4 | 18 March 2025 | Timog | Timog | Mehdi | 0 | Quit; Day 11 |
| Episode 4 | 18 March 2025 | Kanluran | Silangan | Benoît | 4-1 | 5th Voted Out; Day 11 |
| Episode 5 | 25 March 2025 | Naïs | Virak | Mohamed | 3-1-1 | 6th Voted Out; Day 14 |
| Episode 5 | 25 March 2025 | Maxime | Virak | Mohamed | 3-1-1 | 6th Voted Out; Day 14 |
| Episode 6 | 1 April 2025 | Tugawe | Tugawe | Pauline | ~~8~~-1-1-1 (Note: A hidden immunity necklace was used. A second round of voting occurred due to a tie.); 7-2 | 7th Voted Out; Day 16 |
| Episode 7 | 8 April 2025 | Tugawe | Tugawe | Andréa | 7-1 | 8th Voted Out; Day 19 |
| Episode 8 | 15 April 2025 | Tugawe | | Maxime | | Eliminated; ~~1st Jury Member~~ (Note: Maxime would later go on to return to the game.); Day 22 |
| Episode 9 | 22 April 2025 | | Louise | Adrien | 7-7-1; 7-7 | 9th Voted Out; ~~2nd Jury Member~~ (Note: Adrien was evacuated from the jury.); Day 23 |
| Episode 10 | 29 April 2025 | Jérôme M. & Louise | Jérôme S. | Frédéric | 0 | Medically evacuated Day 25 |
| Episode 10 | 29 April 2025 | Jérôme M. & Louise | Jérôme S. | Jessica | 0 | Lost Challenge; 1st Jury Member; Day 26 |
| Episode 10 | 29 April 2025 | Jérôme M. & Louise | Jérôme S. | Louise | 7-6 | 10th Voted Out; 2nd Jury Member; Day 26 |
| Episode 11 | 6 May 2025 | Naïs | Pierre-Marie | Joana | 11-2 | 11th Voted Out; 3rd Jury Member; Day 29 |
| Episode 12 | 20 May 2025 | Maxime & Noémie | Maxime & Noémie | Naïs & Pierre-Marie | 6-~~5~~ | 12th & 13th Voted Out; 4th & 5th Jury Members; Day 32 |
| Episode 13 | 27 May 2025 | Jérôme S. | | Maxime | 0 | Lost Challenge; 6th Jury Member; Day 33 |
| Episode 14 | 3 June 2025 | | Jérôme M. | Noémie | 5-3 | 14th Voted Out; 7th Jury Member; Day 35 |
| Episode 15 | 10 June 2025 | Céline | Jérôme M. | Céline | 6-2 | 15th Voted Out; 8th Jury Member; Day 38 |
| Episode 16 | 17 June 2025 | | Jérôme M., Maël & Gaëlle | Jérôme S. | 0 | Lost Challenge; 9th Jury Member; Day 39 |
| Episode 16 | 17 June 2025 | | Jérôme M., Maël & Gaëlle | Claire | 0 | Lost Challenge; 10th Jury Member; Day 39 |
| Episode 17 | 24 June 2025 | | Gaëlle | Jérôme M. | 1 | Lost Challenge; 11th Jury Member; Day 40 |
| Episode 17 | 24 June 2025 | | | Jury vote | | |
| Episode 17 | 24 June 2025 | | | Maël | 7-4 | Runner-Up; Day 40 |
| Episode 17 | 24 June 2025 | | | Gaëlle | 7-4 | Sole Survivor; Day 40 |

== Voting history ==
| # | Original Tribe | | | | | | | | | | | | Merged Tribe | | | | | | | | | | | | | | |
|---|---|---|---|---|---|---|---|---|---|---|---|---|---|---|---|---|---|---|---|---|---|---|---|---|---|---|---|
| Episode | 1 | 2 | 3 | | 4 | | | 5 | 6 | | 7 | 8 | 9 | | | 10 | | | 11 | 12 | | 13 | 14 | 15 | 16 | | 17 |
| Voted out | Cynthiana | Mehdi | Allan | Christian | Romane | Mehdi | Benoît | Mohamed | Pauline | | Andréa | Maxime | Adrien | | | Frédéric | Jessica | Louise | Joana | Naïs | Pierre-Marie | Maxime | Noémie | Céline | Jérôme S. | Claire | Jérôme M. |
| Votes | 4-1-1 | 4-1 | 0 | 5-1 | 3-1 | 0 | 4-1 | ~~6~~-3-0 (Note: Naïs played an immunity necklace on herself, negating 6 votes against her.) | ~~8~~-1-1-1 (Note: Andréa played an immunity necklace on herself, negating 8 votes against her.) | 7-2-0 | 7-1 | 4 (Note: Upon agreement between the four Ambassadors (Frédéric, Louise, Maël and Pierre-Marie).) | 7-7-1 (Note: As Adrien and Noémie tied, a new vote immediately occurred.) | 7-7 (Note: Frédéric's penalty vote did not count in the revote.) | Rock Draw (Note: After two rounds of voting, the tribe could not decide between eliminating Adrien and Noémie. Both picked rocks and Adrien drew the black rock, resulting in his elimination.) | 0 (Note: Frédéric was medically evacuated due to a shoulder injury. He was replaced by Maxime, since Adrien was also medically evacuated from the Jury Residence.) | Challenge (Note: Jessica lost the immunity challenge and was therefore immediately eliminated.) | 7-6 | 11-2 | 6-~~5~~ (Note: Jérôme S. used an immunity necklace on himself, negating 5 votes against him and none against Gaëlle.) | Tied Destinies (Note: For the entirety of the twelfth episode, castaways were paired and would win challenges as a pair. In addition, the castaway voted out also brought their partner out of the game with them.) | Challenge (Note: The castaway finishing last in the reward challenge, as well as two other castaways picked by its winner and second placer, had to compete in a challenge in which the loser would be eliminated.) | 5-3 | 6-2 | Challenge (Note: The final five took part in the Orienteering Race. The first three to finish would make up the final three, with the remaining two people being eliminated.) | | 1 |
| Gaëlle | | | | Christian | | | Benoît | ~~Naïs~~ | | | | | Adrien | Adrien | | | | Naïs | Joana | Naïs | | | Noémie | Céline | Won | | Jérôme M. |
| Maël | Cynthiana | Mehdi | | | Romane | | | ~~Naïs~~ | | | | Maxime | Adrien | Adrien | | | | Naïs | Joana | Naïs | | | Gaëlle | Céline | Won | | |
| Jérôme M. | | | | | | | | | ~~Andréa~~ | Pauline | Andréa | | Noémie | Noémie | | | | Louise | Joana | ~~Jérôme S.~~ | | Won | Noémie | Céline | Won | | |
| Claire | | | | | | | | | ~~Andréa~~ | Pauline | Andréa | | Noémie | Noémie | | | | Louise | Naïs | ~~Jérôme S.~~ | | Won | Noémie | Céline | Lost | | |
| Jérôme S. | Cynthiana | Mehdi | | | Romane | | | ~~Naïs~~ | | | | | Adrien | Adrien | | | | Naïs | Joana | Naïs | | | Gaëlle | Céline | Lost | | |
| Céline | | | | Christian | | | Benoît | ~~Naïs~~ | | | | | Adrien | Adrien | | | | Naïs | Joana | Naïs | | | Noémie | Jérôme S. | | | |
| Noémie | Cynthiana | Mehdi | | | Romane | | | ~~Naïs~~ | | | | | Adrien | Adrien | Won | | | Naïs | Joana | Naïs | | | Gaëlle | | | | |
| Maxime | | | | Christian | | | Benoît | | ~~Andréa~~ | Pauline | Andréa | | | | | | | Louise | Joana | Naïs | | Lost | | | | | |
| Pierre-Marie | | | | | | | | | ~~Andréa~~ | Joana | Andréa | Maxime | Noémie | Noémie | | | | Louise | Joana | ~~Jérôme S.~~ | | | | | | | |
| Naïs | | | | | | | | Mohamed | | | | | Noémie | Noémie | | | | Louise | Joana | ~~Jérôme S.~~ | | | | | | | |
| Joana | | | | | | | | | ~~Andréa~~ | Pauline | Andréa | | Noémie | Noémie | | | | Louise | Naïs | | | | | | | | |
| Louise | | | | Christian | | | Benoît | | ~~Andréa~~ | Pauline | Andréa | Maxime | Adrien | Adrien | | | | Naïs | | | | | | | | | |
| Jessica | | | | | | | | Mohamed | | | | | Noémie | Noémie | | | Lost | | | | | | | | | | |
| Frédéric | | | | | | | | ~~Naïs~~ | | | | Maxime | Adrien | Adrien | | | | | | | | | | | | | |
| Adrien | | | | | | | | Mohamed | | | | | Noémie | Noémie | Lost | | | | | | | | | | | | |
| Andréa | | | | | | | | | Pauline | Pauline | Pierre-Marie | | | | | | | | | | | | | | | | |
| Pauline | | | | | | | | | ~~Andréa~~ | Joana | | | | | | | | | | | | | | | | | |
| Mohamed | | | | | | | | ~~Naïs~~ | | | | | | | | | | | | | | | | | | | |
| Benoît | | | | Christian | | | Maxime | | | | | | | | | | | | | | | | | | | | |
| Mehdi | Jérôme S. | Noémie | | | | | | | | | | | | | | | | | | | | | | | | | |
| Romane | Cynthiana | Mehdi | | | Maël | | | | | | | | | | | | | | | | | | | | | | |
| Christian | | | | Benoît | | | | | | | | | | | | | | | | | | | | | | | |
| Allan | | | | | | | | | | | | | | | | | | | | | | | | | | | |
| Cynthiana | Mehdi | | | | | | | | | | | | | | | | | | | | | | | | | | |
| Penalty votes | | | | | | | | Frédéric | Jérôme M. | | | | Frédéric | | | | | | Joana | | | | | Céline | | | |
| Penalty votes | | | | | | | | Gaëlle | Joana | | | | Frédéric | | | | | | Joana | | | | | Céline | | | |
| Black votes | | | | | | | | | | | | | | | | | | Louise (Note: Upon his exit, Adrien willed a black vote for the next Merged Tribal Council to Pierre-Marie.) | Joana (Note: Upon her exit, Louise willed a black vote for the next Merged Tribal Council to Gaëlle.) | ~~Jérôme S.~~ (Note: Upon her exit, Joana willed a black vote for the next Merged Tribal Council to Claire.) | | | Noémie (Note: Upon her exit, Naïs willed a black vote for the next Merged Tribal Council to Jérôme M.) | Céline (Note: Upon her exit, Noémie willed a black vote for the next Merged Tribal Council to Maël.) | | | |

Jury vote
| Episode # | 17 | |
|---|---|---|
| Day # | 40 | |
| Finalist | Gaëlle | Maël |
| Vote | 7-4 | |
| Juror | Vote | |
| Jérôme M. | Gaëlle | |
| Claire | Gaëlle | |
| Jérôme S. | | Maël |
| Céline | Gaëlle | |
| Noémie | | Maël |
| Maxime | Gaëlle | |
| Pierre-Marie | | Maël |
| Naïs | Gaëlle | |
| Joana | | Maël |
| Louise | Gaëlle | |
| Jessica | Gaëlle | |

== Future appearances ==
Joana Callico and Maxime Lubian returned to compete for Koh-Lanta: All Stars.
