= Koh-Lanta: All Stars =

- Season Special Edition
- Presented by: Denis Brogniart
- No. of days: 32
- No. of castaways: 18
- Winner: Lola Labesse
- Runner-up: Freddy Boucher
- Location: Pearl Islands, Panama
- No. of episodes: 13

Release
- Original network: TF1
- Original release: 25 August – 17 November 2026

Season chronology
- ← Previous; Les Reliques du Destin

Koh-Lanta: All Stars is the eighth special season and the thirty-fourth season overall of the French reality television series Koh-Lanta. The season is filmed in Pearl Islands, Panama where 18 contestants compete for €100,000 and the title of Sole Survivor.

The contestants find their fates intertwined from the very start of the game. Each pair consists of a man and a woman who competed in the same season of Koh-Lanta. They must win the reward and immunity challenges, but they will also face the consequences of defeat; if one member of the pair is eliminated at Tribal Council, their partner immediately leaves the competition as well.

Another new feature is the "Îlot du Salut" (Islet of Salvation). On this separate island, reward challenge winners can enjoy an all-inclusive stay for a few hours; the islet features a hut and provides the lucky winners with fishing gear and a fire-starting stone. They will also have the necessary equipment to practice for the following day's immunity challenge.

This season also sees the return of he "Exile Island" mechanic, which allows contestants to return to the game via the arena.

== Contestants ==
List of Koh-Lanta: All Stars contestants
Contestant	Tied Destiny	Swapped Tribe	Merged Tribe	Voted out	Exile Island	Finish
Joana Callico; 33, Coubron; La Revanche des 4 Terres	La Revanche des 4 Terres			Eliminated; Day 3	Lost Challenge; Day 9	18th Day 9
Moussa Niangane; 44, Châtenay-Malabry; Bocas del Toro, La Revanche des Héros & L'Île des héros	L'Île des héros			2nd Voted Out; Day 6	Lost Challenge; Day 9	17th Day 9
Naoil Tita; 43, Puteaux; L'Île des héros	L'Île des héros			Eliminated; Day 6	Lost Challenge; Day 9	16th Day 9
Jacques Roque; 40, Paris; La Tribu Maudite	La Tribu Maudite			3rd Voted Out; Day 8	Lost Challenge; Day 9	15th Day 9
Maxime Lubian; Returned to Game	La Revanche des 4 Terres			1st Voted Out; Day 3	Won Challenge; Day 9	
Charlotte Rasquin; Returned to Game	La Tribu Maudite			Eliminated; Day 8	Won Challenge; Day 9	
Laure Canavarolo; 31, Malbrans; Les Armes Secrètes	Les Armes Secrètes	Sebako		Medically Evacuated; Day 18		14th Day 18
Charlotte Rasquin; 30, Ciney, Belgium; La Tribu Maudite	La Tribu Maudite	Taboga		5th Voted Out; Day 14	Lost Challenge; Day 18	13th Day 18
Tania Čakarević; 26, Bondy; Le Feu Sacré	Le Feu Sacré	Sebako		8th Voted Out; Day 18	Lost Challenge; Day 18	12th Day 18
Camille Schneiderlin; Returned to Game	Malaisie	Taboga		6th Voted Out; Day 17	Returned to Game; Day 18	
Lola Labesse; Returned to Game	Les 4 Terres	Taboga		4th Voted Out; Day 11	Won Challenge; Day 18	
Nicolas Pretot; Returned to Game	Le Feu Sacré	Taboga		7th Voted Out; Day 18	Won Challenge; Day 18	
Yassin Metiri; 48, Bordeaux; Cambodge & Le Combat des Héros	Cambodge	Taboga	Koh-Lanta	9th Voted Out; Day 21	Lost Challenge; 1st Jury Member; Day 25	11th Day 25
Camille Schneiderlin; 32, Nice; Malaisie	Malaisie	Taboga	Koh-Lanta	Lost Challenge; Day 22	Lost Challenge; 2nd Jury Member; Day 25	10th Day 25
Vincent Blier; 33, Paris; Les Armes Secrètes	Les Armes Secrètes	Taboga	Koh-Lanta	10th Voted Out; Day 24	Lost Challenge; 3rd Jury Member; Day 28	9th Day 28
Clémentine Jullien; 34, La Clusaz; Cambodge, Le Combat des Héros & La Légende	Cambodge	Sebako	Koh-Lanta	11th Voted Out; Day 26	Lost Challenge; 4th Jury Member; Day 28	8th Day 28
Ugo Lartiche; 45, Argelès-sur-Mer; Malaisie, La Légende & La Tribu Maudite	Malaisie	Sebako	Koh-Lanta	Eliminated; Day 26	Lost Challenge; 5th Jury Member; Day 30	7th Day 30
Dorian Louvet; 36, Caen; Les 4 Terres	Les 4 Terres	Sebako	Koh-Lanta	Lost Challenge; Day 29	Lost Challenge; 6th Jury Member; Day 30	6th Day 30
Christina Chevry; Returned to Game	Palau	Taboga	Koh-Lanta	12th Voted Out; Day 29	Won Challenge; Day 30	
Nicolas Pretot; 46, Grosseto-Prugna; Le Feu Sacré	Le Feu Sacré	Taboga	Koh-Lanta	Lost Challenge; 7th Jury Member; Day 31		5th Day 31
Maxime Lubian; 34, Thaon-les-Vosges; La Revanche des 4 Terres	La Revanche des 4 Terres	Sebako	Koh-Lanta	Lost Challenge; 8th Jury Member; Day 31		4th Day 31
Christina Chevry; 40, Marseille; Palau, Le Choc des Héros, La Nouvelle Edition	Palau	Taboga	Koh-Lanta	13th Voted Out; 9th Jury Member; Day 32		3rd Day 32
Freddy Boucher; 41, Saint-Chartier; Palau, Le Choc des héros, La Revanche des Héros, La Nouvelle Edition & La Légende	Palau	Sebako	Koh-Lanta	Runner-up; Day 32		2nd Day 32
Lola Labesse; 30, Annecy; Les 4 Terres	Les 4 Terres	Taboga	Koh-Lanta	Sole Survivor; Day 32		1st Day 32

== Challenges ==
Air date	Challenge		Exile Island Inhabitants	Exile Island Elimination	Eliminated	Vote	Finish
Air date	Reward	Immunity	Exile Island Inhabitants	Exile Island Elimination	Eliminated	Vote	Finish
25 August 2026	Yassin & Clémentine (Note: Clémentine and Yassin have the opportunity to invite two other contestants to share the reward. They choose Charlotte and Jacques.)	Christina & Freddy	None		Maxime & Joana	~~9-9~~11-7	1st Voted Out; Day 3
1 September 2026	Dorian & Lola (Note: Ugo and Camille, having finished second, also enjoy the reward.)	Dorian & Lola	Maxime & Joana		Moussa & Naoil	12-2-1-1	2nd Voted Out; Day 6
8 September 2026	Team White (Note: For this comfort challenge, the pairs were divided into two teams: the White team, consisting of the pairs Clémentine & Yassin, Christina & Freddy, and Nicolas & Tania; and the Black team, consisting of the pairs Camille & Ugo, Dorian & Lola, and Charlotte & Jacques. The pair Laure & Vincent is not participating in the challenge because they were not chosen by either of the two teams..)	Vincent & Laure	Maxime & Joana, Moussa & Naoil		Jacque & Charlotte	12-2	3rd Voted Out; Day 9
15 September 2026	Sebako	Sebako	Joana & Maxime, Moussa & Naoil, Jacques & Charlotte	Joana, Moussa, Naoil & Jacques	Lola	4-3	4th Voted Out; Day 11
22 September 2026	Sebako	Sebako	Lola		Charlotte	~~3-3~~3-2-1	5th Voted Out; Day 14
29 September 2026	Taboga	Sebako	Lola & Charlotte		Camille	5-1	6th Voted Out; Day 17
6 October 2026	Sebako		Lola, Charlotte, Camille, Nicolas & Tania	Tania & Charlotte	Nicolas	~~2-2~~-2*~~2~~	7th Voted Out; Day 18
6 October 2026	Sebako		Lola, Charlotte, Camille, Nicolas & Tania	Tania & Charlotte	Tania	5-1	8th Voted Out; Day 18
13 October 2026		Dorian & Clémentine			Yassin	6-4-1-1	9th Voted Out; Day 21
20 October 2026	Maxime (Note: Maxime has the option to invite one contestant to share the reward. He chooses Clémentine.)	Ugo	Yassin		Vincent	6-2-2	10th Voted Out; Day 24
27 October 2026	Clémentine & Ugo (Note: Clémentine and Ugo have the opportunity to invite two other contestants to share the reward. They choose Lola and Dorian.)	Maxime & Nicolas	Yassin, Camille et Vincent	Yassin & Camille	Clémentine & Ugo	5-4-1-1	11th & 12th Voted Out; Day 26
3 November 2026	Lola	Freddy	Vincent, Clémentine & Ugo	Vincent & Clémentine	Christina	3-2	13th Voted Out
10 November 2026		Lola, Freddy & Christina	Ugo, Dorian & Christina	Dorian & Ugo	Maxime & Nicolas		Lost Challenge
17 November 2026		Lola			Christina		

=== Special stages ===
	Episodes	Winner(s)	Gain	Loser(s)	Loss
1st Permanent elimination from the adventure	4th episodes	Maxime et Charlotte	Right to return to the adventure	Joana, Moussa, Naoil, Jacques	Permanent elimination from the adventure
2nd Permanent elimination from the adventure	7th episodes	Lola	Right to return to the game + individual strategic advantage (1st place)	Charlotte et Tania	Permanent elimination from the adventure
2nd Permanent elimination from the adventure	7th episodes	Nicolas	Right to return to the competition (2nd place)	Charlotte et Tania	Permanent elimination from the adventure

== Voting history ==
#	Tied Destinies							Original Tribe								Merged Tribe									
► Episode	1			2		3		4	5		6	7				8	9		10		11	12	13	Finalist	Winner
► Eliminated	Maxime		Joana	Moussa	Naoil	Jacques	Charlotte	Lola	Charlotte		Camille	Laure	Nicolas		Tania	Yassin	Camille	Vincent	Clémentine	Ugo					
► Votes	~~9-9~~ (Note: Following a tie during the council, a second vote is held between Laure and Maxime.)	11-7	0 (Note: Joana is eliminated, following the elimination of Maxime, her partner at the council..)	12-2-1-1	0 (Note: Naoil is eliminated, following the elimination of Moussa, her partner at the council..)	12-2	0 (Note: Charlotte is eliminated, following the elimination of Jacques, her partner at the council..)	4-3 (Note: Charlotte gave her immunity necklace to Camille)	~~2-2-2~~	3-2-1 (Note: As Vincent, Camille, and Charlotte were tied, a new vote was held immediately.)	5-1 (Note: Vincent used an immunity necklace to protect himself. No votes are nullified.)	0 (Note: Laure dislocated her shoulder during the Day 18 reward challenge and has to leave the competition.)	~~2-2~~	Rock Draw	5-1	6-4-1-1 (Note: Lola, Nicolas, and Maxime use an immunity necklace to protect themselves. A vote against Nicolas is nullified.)	0 (Note: For the comfort challenge, the contestant who finishes last (namely Camille) is immediately eliminated.)	6-2-2	6-4-1-1	0 (Note: Ugo is eliminated, following the elimination of Clémentine, her partner at the council..)	0 (Note: For the comfort challenge, the contestant who finishes last (namely ...) is immediately eliminated.)	Challenge (Note: The final five took part in the Orienteering Race. The first three to finish would make up the final three, with the remaining two people being eliminated.)	1		
▼ Contestants	Votes																								
Christina	~~Laure~~	Laure		Moussa		Jacques		Lola	~~Charlotte~~ (Note: Christina's first vote was not revealed in the episode.)	Charlotte	Camille		~~Yassin~~	Yassin		Yassin		Lola	Clémentine						
Clémentine	~~Laure~~	Maxime		Moussa		Jacques									Tania	Yassin		Vincent	Freddy	Banished					
Dorian	~~Maxime~~	Maxime		Moussa		Jacques									Tania	Vincent		Vincent	Freddy						
Freddy	~~Laure~~	Laure		Moussa		Jacques									Tania	Yassin		Lola	Clémentine						
Lola	~~Maxime~~	Maxime		Moussa		Jacques		Christina	Banished							Vincent		Vincent	Freddy						
Maxime	~~Laure~~	Laure	Banished												Tania	Yassin		Vincent	Clémentine						
Nicolas	~~Maxime~~	Maxime		Moussa		Jacques		Lola	~~Camille~~ (Note: Nicolas's first vote was not revealed in the episode.)	Charlotte	Camille		~~Yassin~~	Yassin	Banished	Vincent		Vincent	Clémentine						
Ugo	~~Maxime~~	Maxime		Moussa		Jacques									Tania	Yassin		Vincent	Freddy		Banished				
Vincent	~~Maxime~~	Maxime		Moussa		Jacques		Lola	~~Charlotte~~	Charlotte	Camille		~~Nicolas~~	Nicolas		~~Nicolas~~		Freddy	Banished						
Camille	~~Maxime~~	Maxime		Moussa		Jacques		Christina	~~Vincent~~	Vincent	Yassin	Banished				Yassin		Banished							
Yassin	~~Maxime~~	Maxime		Laure		Jacques		Lola	~~Camille~~	Camille	Camille		~~Nicolas~~	Nicolas		Christina	Banished								
Tania	~~Maxime~~	Maxime		Moussa		Jacques									Ugo										
Laure	~~Maxime~~	Maxime		Moussa		Jacques																			
Charlotte	~~Laure~~	Laure		Moussa		Tania		Christina	~~Vincent~~	Vincent	Banished														
Jacques	~~Laure~~	Maxime		Nicolas		Tania	Banished																		
Naoil	~~Laure~~	Laure		Vincent		Banished																			
Moussa	~~Laure~~	Laure		Vincent	Banished																				
Joana	~~Laure~~	Laure		Banished																					
Penalty/Advantage											Camille (Note: Yassin obtained a double vote on Day 16.)					Vincent (Note: Lola earns a double vote following her victory in the second banished players' challenge.)			Lola/Dorian (Note: Dorian and Lola each received a vote against them following their last-place finish in the immunity challenge.)						
Black votes																		Freddy	Clémentine						
