= Koh-Lanta: Les Armes Secrètes =

Season of Koh-Lanta

- Season 22
- Presented by: Denis Brogniart
- No. of days: 35
- No. of castaways: 21
- Winner: Maxine Eouzan
- Runner-up: Lucie Bertaud
- Location: Taha'a, French Polynesia
- No. of episodes: 13

Release
- Original network: TF1
- Original release: 12 March – 4 June 2021

Season chronology
- ← Previous; Les 4 Terres Next → La Légende

Koh-Lanta: Les Armes Secrètes (transl. "Koh-Lanta: The Secret Weapons") is the twenty-second regular season and the twenty-sixth season overall of the French reality television series Koh-Lanta. For the first time since Cambodge, the series is filmed outside of Fiji, being filmed in Taha'a, French Polynesia. Twenty contestants from across France are split into two tribes to fight for food & win immunity to avoid tribal council whilst trying to not be voted off. The main twist this season is that there are secret weapons that can be used by the contestants to advance their game. Some of the weapons include, "Vote Hijacking" which allows a vote to be stolen from another contestant, the "Black Bracelet" allowing a hidden immunity idol to be cancelled after being played & the "Secret Ambassador" which allows a contestant to secretly save a contestant from elimination from the ambassadors without their realisation. The grand prize is €100,000. The season premiered on 12 March 2021 on TF1.

== Contestants ==
Contestant	Original Tribe	Episode 2 Tribe	Merged Tribe	Finish
Sylviane Simonnet; 44, Parempuyre	Toa			1st Voted Out; Day 3
Marie Oheix; 25, Bordeaux	Oro	Oro		2nd Voted Out; Day 6
Élodie Poillion Faelens; 35, Cysoing	Toa	Toa		3rd Voted Out; Day 9
Candice Rousset; 25, Saint-Étienne	Oro	Oro		4th Voted Out; Day 12
Gabin Peillon; 27, Bernex	Oro	Oro		Medically Evacuated; Day 15 (Note: Gabin was medically evacuated from the game. Magali re-entered the game to replace him.)
Aurélien Tesson; 34, Caen	Toa	Toa		6th Voted Out; Day 15
Frédéric Baudet; 48, Avignon	Oro	Oro		7th Voted Out; 1st Jury Member; Day 17
Hervé Comte; 44, Audincourt	Oro	Oro	Koh-Lanta	8th Voted Out; 2nd Jury Member; Day 17
Mathieu Orsolani; 29, Ajaccio	Toa	Toa	Koh-Lanta	Eliminated; 3rd Jury Member; Day 20
Shanice Mendy; 26, Paris	Toa	Toa	Koh-Lanta	9th Voted Out; 4th Jury Member; Day 20
Myriam Chafik; 36, Trévoux	Toa	Toa	Koh-Lanta	10th Voted Out; 5th Jury Member; Day 23
Vincent Blier; 28, Paris	Toa	Toa	Koh-Lanta	11th Voted Out; 6th Jury Member; Day 27
Laëtitia Saphores; 37, Pey	Toa	Toa	Koh-Lanta	Eliminated; 7th Jury Member; Day 27
Thomas Plisson; 37, Condé-sur-Vesgre	Toa	Toa	Koh-Lanta	12th Voted Out; 8th Jury Member; Day 30
Flavio Soares Tavares; 31, Grasse	Toa	Toa	Koh-Lanta	Lost Challenge; 9th Jury Member; Day 33
Magali Sevenier; 47, Fabrègues	Oro	Oro	Koh-Lanta	5th Voted Out; Day 13
Magali Sevenier; 47, Fabrègues	Oro	Oro	Koh-Lanta	13th Voted Out; 10th Jury Member; Day 33
Arnaud Deshayes; 36, Hampont	Oro	Oro	Koh-Lanta	Lost Challenge; 11th Jury Member; Day 34
Laure Canevarolo; 26, Malbrans	Oro	Oro	Koh-Lanta	Lost Challenge; 12th Jury Member; Day 34
Jonathan Julien; 31, Millau	Oro	Oro	Koh-Lanta	14th Voted Out; 13th Jury Member; Day 35
Lucie Bertaud; 35, Champigny-sur-Marne		Toa (Note: Lucie entered the game on Day 5 as the prize for Toa winning the reward challenge that day. Should her Tribe lose the next immunity challenge, she would be immune.)	Koh-Lanta	Runner-Up; Day 35
Maxine Eouzan; 25, Champigny-sur-Marne	Oro	Oro	Koh-Lanta	Sole Survivor; Day 35

== Challenges ==
Episode	Air date	Challenges		Eliminated	Finish
Episode	Air date	Reward	Immunity	Eliminated	Finish
Episode 1 (Note: The two winning pairs of the first Reward Challenge would become Tribe Captains and win half-Talismans. If one Captain plays their half-Talisman, they are immune but the other half is rendered useless. If they play them together, both Captains get double votes. Powers last until the first Tribal Council at the Merge.)	12 March 2021	Candice & Hervé	Oro	Sylviane	1st Voted Out; Day 3
Episode 1	12 March 2021	Aurélien & Laëtitia	Oro	Sylviane	1st Voted Out; Day 3
Episode 2	19 March 2021	Toa	Toa	Marie	2nd Voted Out; Day 6
Episode 3	26 March 2021	Oro	Oro	Élodie	3rd Voted Out; Day 9
Episode 4	2 April 2021	Toa	Toa	Candice	4th Voted Out; Day 12
Episode 5	9 April 2021	Toa		Magali	5th Voted Out; Day 13
Episode 5	9 April 2021		Oro	Gabin	Medically Evacuated; Day 15
Episode 5	9 April 2021		Oro	Aurélien	6th Voted Out; Day 15
Episode 6	16 April 2021	Oro		Frédéric	7th Voted Out; 1st Jury Member; Day 17
Episode 6	16 April 2021		Laure	Hervé	8th Voted Out; 2nd Jury Member; Day 17
Episode 7	23 April 2021	Myriam [Shanice] (Note: As Myriam won the reward, she was allowed to bring someone to share the reward with. She chose to take Shanice.)	Jonathan	Mathieu	Eliminated; 3rd Jury Member; Day 20
Episode 7	23 April 2021	Myriam [Shanice]	Jonathan	Shanice	9th Voted Out; 4th Jury Member; Day 20
Episode 8 (Note: For both challenges in Episode 8, the Tribe split into two groups. In the Reward challenge, the groups - drafted by Laure & Vincent - competed, with Lucie not being chosen by either captain. For the Immunity Challenge, Lucie chose to join Vincent's group and two people won immunity - one from each group. The last person in the Immunity Challenge in each group received a penalty vote at Tribal Council.)	30 April 2021	Vincent; Myriam; Flavio; Thomas; Laëtitia	Maxine	Myriam	10th Voted Out; 5th Jury Member; Day 23
Episode 8	30 April 2021	Vincent; Myriam; Flavio; Thomas; Laëtitia	Laëtitia	Myriam	10th Voted Out; 5th Jury Member; Day 23
Episode 9 (Note: For the entirety of the ninth episode, castaways were paired and would win challenges as a pair. In addition, the castaway voted out also brought their partner out of the game with them.)	7 May 2021	Flavio & Laure	Arnaud & Lucie	Vincent	11th Voted Out; 6th Jury Member; Day 27
Episode 9	7 May 2021	Flavio & Laure	Arnaud & Lucie	Laëtitia	Tied Destiny; 7th Jury Member; Day 27
Episode 10	14 May 2021	Jonathan [Lucie, Maxine]	Maxine	Thomas	12th Voted Out; 8th Jury Member; Day 30
Episode 11	21 May 2021	Maxine [Arnaud]	Arnaud	Flavio	Lost Challenge; 9th Jury Member; Day 33
Episode 11	21 May 2021	Maxine [Arnaud]	Arnaud	Magali	13th Voted Out; 10th Jury Member; Day 33
Episode 12	28 May 2021		Jonathan; Lucie; Maxine	Arnaud	Lost Challenge; 11th Jury Member; Day 34
Episode 12	28 May 2021		Jonathan; Lucie; Maxine	Laure	Lost Challenge; 12th Jury Member; Day 34
Episode 13	4 June 2021		Maxine	Jonathan	14th Voted Out; 13th Jury Member; Day 35
Episode 13	4 June 2021			Jury vote	
Episode 13	4 June 2021			Lucie	Runner-Up; Day 35
Episode 13	4 June 2021			Maxine	Sole Survivor; Day 35

== Voting History ==
#	Original Tribe	Episode 2 Tribe						
Episode	1	2	3	4	5			6
Voted out	Sylviane	Marie	Élodie	Candice	Magali	Gabin	Aurélien	Frédéric
Votes	7-4-1-1	6-3-2-1	6-3-1	5-4	5-1-1-1	No Vote	5-4	Consensus (Note: As the ambassadors, Maxine & Vincent had to decide who would be the final person voted off before the merge. In addition, as the secret ambassador, Laure had to approve or declined Maxine's & Vincent's choice on whom should be voted off. They unanimously agreed to vote off Frédéric.)
Maxine		Arnaud		Candice	Magali			Frédéric
Lucie			Laëtitia				Aurélien	
Jonathan		Laure		Magali	Magali			
Laure		Frédéric		Candice	Magali			Frédéric
Arnaud		Marie		Candice	Magali			
Magali		Marie		Candice	Frédéric			
Flavio	Sylviane		Élodie				Lucie	
Thomas	Élodie		Élodie				Aurélien	
Laëtitia	Élodie		Élodie				Lucie	
Vincent	Sylviane		Élodie				Aurélien	Frédéric
Myriam	Sylviane		Élodie				Aurélien	
Shanice	Sylviane		Lucie				Aurélien	
Mathieu	Sylviane		Laëtitia				Lucie	
Hervé		Marie		Magali	Maxine			
Frédéric		Marie		Magali	Magali			
Aurélien	Sylviane		Élodie				Lucie	
Gabin		Marie		Candice	Jonathan			
Candice		Arnaud		Magali				
Élodie	Sylviane		Laëtitia					
Marie		Frédéric						
Sylviane	Élodie							
Penalty Votes	Élodie (Note: Élodie, Mathieu & Shanice were amongst the last four to arrive on the beach after starting the game. There were each penalized a vote at their first tribal council.)	Frédéric (Note: Frédéric was amongst the last four to arrive on the beach after starting the game. He was penalized with a vote at his first tribal council.); Marie (Note: Marie competed in an 'All or Nothing' duel after Magali used a secret weapon on her. Marie lost & was penalized with a vote at tribal council.)						
Penalty Votes	Mathieu	Frédéric; Marie						
Penalty Votes	Shanice	Frédéric; Marie						

#	Merged Tribe											
Episode	6	7		8	9 (Note: Due to the Tied Destinies twist, the tribe was divided into five pairs - each identified by a different colour. These pairs are reflected in the voting table by their colours for the ninth episode only.)		10	11		12		13
Voted out	Hervé	Mathieu	Shanice	Myriam	Vincent	Laëtitia	Thomas	Flavio	Magali	Arnaud	Laure	Jonathan
Votes	6-3-1-0 (Note: Arnaud used a hidden immunity idol on himself. Therefore, 4 votes against him did not count.) (Note: Laëtitia used her part of the tailsman on herself. As a result, she was immune from being voted off.)	No Vote (Note: Mathieu finished last in the immunity challenge. As Jonathan won, he got to choose who would face Mathieu in an elimination duel. He chose Thomas. Thomas won the duel against Mathieu, eliminating him.)	7-6	8-5-1	8-2-0 (Note: Laëtitia played a hidden immunity idol on Vincent. However, Lucie played a black bracelet, enabling her to take immunity from them & give it to someone else. She chose to give it to Maxine. As Maxine's partner was Thomas, he was also immune & one vote against him did not count as a result.)	No Vote (Note: As Laëtitia was Vincent's partner, she was eliminated with him.)	8-1	No Vote (Note: The castaway who placed last in the Day 33 Immunity Challenge was immediately eliminated. That was Flavio.)	4-3	No Vote (Note: The final five took part in the Orienteering Race. The first three to finish would make up the final three, with the remaining people being eliminated.)		1-0
Maxine	Hervé		Shanice	Myriam	Vincent		Thomas		Magali	Win		Jonathan
Lucie	~~Arnaud~~		Laure	Myriam	Vincent		Thomas		Magali	Win		No Vote
Lucie	~~Arnaud~~		Laure	Myriam	Vincent		Thomas		Magali (Note: At Tribal Council, Lucie played an advantage that allowed her to take Magali's vote. As a result, Magali could not vote at tribal council.)	Win		No Vote
Jonathan	Thomas		Shanice	Myriam	Vincent		Thomas		Lucie	Win		No Vote
Jonathan	Thomas		Shanice	Myriam	Vincent		Thomas		Lucie (Note: Thomas willed a black vote to Jonathan upon his elimination, allowing him to vote for Lucie twice at the sixth Merged Tribal Council.)	Win		No Vote
Laure	Hervé		Shanice	Myriam	Vincent		Thomas		Magali	Lose		
Arnaud	Thomas		Shanice	Myriam	Vincent		Thomas		Lucie	Lose		
Arnaud	Thomas		Shanice (Note: Hervé willed a black vote to Arnaud upon his elimination, allowing him to vote for Shanice twice at the second Merged Tribal Council.)	Myriam	Vincent		Thomas		Lucie	Lose		
Magali	Jonathan		Shanice	Myriam	Vincent		Thomas		No Vote			
Flavio	~~Arnaud~~		Laure	Arnaud	Magali		Thomas					
Flavio	~~Arnaud~~		Laure	Arnaud	Magali		Thomas (Note: Vincent willed a black vote to Flavio upon his elimination, allowing him to vote for Thomas twice at the fifth Merged Tribal Council.)					
Thomas	Hervé	Win	Laure	Arnaud	Vincent		Flavio					
Thomas	Hervé	Win	Laure	Arnaud	Vincent (Note: Myriam willed a black vote to Thomas upon her elimination, allowing him to vote for Vincent twice at the fourth Merged Tribal Council.)		Flavio					
Laëtitia	~~Arnaud~~		Laure	Myriam	~~Thomas~~							
Vincent	~~Arnaud~~		Shanice	Myriam	Magali							
Myriam	Hervé		Laure	Arnaud								
Myriam	Hervé		Laure	Arnaud (Note: Shanice willed a black vote to Myriam upon her elimination, allowing her to vote for Arnaud twice at the third Merged Tribal Council.)								
Shanice	Hervé		Laure									
Mathieu	Hervé	Lose										
Hervé	Thomas											
Penalty Votes				Arnaud								
Penalty Votes				Vincent								

Jury vote
Episode #	13	
Day #	35	
Finalist	Lucie	Maxine
Vote	9-4	
Juror	Vote	
Jonathan		Maxine
Laure		Maxine
Arnaud		Maxine
Magali	Lucie	
Flavio		Maxine
Thomas		Maxine
Laëtitia		Maxine
Vincent		Maxine
Myriam		Maxine
Shanice	Lucie	
Mathieu		Maxine
Hervé	Lucie	
Frédéric	Lucie	

== Future appearances ==
Vincent Blier returned for Fort Boyard. Laure Canevarolo and Vincent Blier returned for Koh-Lanta: All Stars.
