= Koh-Lanta: Le Totem Maudit =

Season of Koh-Lanta

- Season 23
- Presented by: Denis Brogniart
- No. of days: 39
- No. of castaways: 24
- Winners: Bastien San Pedro & François Descamp
- Runner-up: Géraldine Nicolle
- Location: Calamian Islands, Philippines

Release
- Original network: TF1
- Original release: 22 February – 21 June 2022

Season chronology
- ← Previous; La Légende Next → Le Feu Sacré

Koh-Lanta: Le Totem maudit (transl. "Koh-Lanta: The Cursed Totem") is the twenty-third regular season of the French reality television series Koh-Lanta. 24 contestants are split into three tribes and sent to live and survive in the Calamian Islands of the Philippines where they compete against each other for immunity and reward while also avoiding tribal council. The main twist this season is The Cursed Totem which is given to the tribe or contestant that finishes last in a challenge where they'll receive a 'curse' that they must endure for their loss. The season premiered on 22 February 2022 on TF1.

== Contestants ==
Contestant	Original Tribe	Swapped Tribe	Switched Tribe	Day 16 Tribe	Merged Tribe	Finish
Céline "Lili" Gasnier; 40, Saint-Malo	Ilog					1st Voted Out; Day 2
Céline Dufrenoy; 41, Coupvray	Turung					2nd Voted Out; Day 3
Franck Macia; 52, Biarritz	Ilog	Ilog				Left Competition; Day 4
Mattéo Real; 20, Paris	Turung	Turung				3rd Voted Out; Day 6
Samira Aït-Brahim; 34, Casablanca, Morocco	Nacpan	Nacpan	Cadlao			4th Voted Out; Day 9
Benjamin Breerette; 24, La Baule-Escoublac	Nacpan	Nacpan	Matingi			5th Voted Out; Day 11
Stéphanie Tribot; Returned to Game	Turung	Turung	Matingi			6th Voted Out; Day 15
Jean-Philippe Masy; 36, Dieppe	Ilog	Ilog	Cadlao			Medically Evacuated; Day 16
Stéphanie Tribot; 35, Paris	Turung	Turung	Matingi	Cadlao		7th Voted Out; Day 17
Alexandra Élizé; 35, Schœlcher, Martinique	Nacpan	Nacpan	Matingi	Matingi		8th Voted Out; Day 20
Setha El Hajjami; 35, Vaulx-en-Velin	Turung	Ilog	Matingi	Matingi		9th Voted Out; Day 22
Colin Mottas; 25, Grolley, Switzerland	Nacpan	Nacpan	Matingi	Matingi	Koh-Lanta	10th Voted Out; 1st Jury Member; Day 23
Pauline Pourchaire; 24, Peymeinade	Ilog	Ilog	Cadlao	Cadlao	Koh-Lanta	Eliminated; 2nd Jury Member; Day 25
Yannick Zachée; 34, Cannes	Turung	Turung	Matingi	Matingi	Koh-Lanta	11th Voted Out; 3rd Jury Member; Day 25
Anne-Sophie Mounier; 34, Glyfada, Greece	Turung	Turung	Matingi	Matingi	Koh-Lanta	12th Voted Out; 4th Jury Member; Day 28
Maxime Tournoux; 33, Paris	Nacpan	Nacpan	Cadlao	Cadlao	Koh-Lanta	13th Voted Out; 5th Jury Member; Day 31
Louana Roy; 28, Ville-d'Avray	Ilog	Ilog	Cadlao	Cadlao	Koh-Lanta	Eliminated; 6th Jury Member; Day 31
Fouzi Ould Bouamama; 28, Lille	Nacpan	Nacpan	Cadlao	Cadlao	Koh-Lanta	Eliminated; 7th Jury Member; Day 33
Nicolas Bellon; 39, Nîmes	Ilog	Ilog	Matingi	Matingi	Koh-Lanta	14th Voted Out; 8th Jury Member; Day 34
Olga Khokhlova; 35, Paris	Nacpan	Nacpan	Matingi	Matingi	Koh-Lanta	15th Voted Out; 9th Jury Member; Day 37
Ambre Daudet; 27, Saint-Brès	Ilog	Turung	Cadlao	Cadlao	Koh-Lanta	Eliminated; 10th Jury Member; Day 38
Jean-Charles Chatelus; 40, Saint-Jean-Soleymieux	Turung	Turung	Cadlao	Cadlao	Koh-Lanta	16th Voted Out; 11th Jury Member; Day 39
Géraldine Nicolle; 47, Vannes	Nacpan	Nacpan	Cadlao	Cadlao	Koh-Lanta	Runner-Up; Day 39
Bastien San Pedro; 32, Lyon	Turung	Turung	Matingi	Matingi	Koh-Lanta	Dual Survivors; Day 39
François Descamp; 38, Vailhauquès	Ilog	Ilog	Cadlao	Cadlao	Koh-Lanta	Dual Survivors; Day 39

== Challenges ==
Episode	Air date	Challenges		Eliminated	Finish
Episode	Air date	Reward	Immunity	Eliminated	Finish
Episode 1	22 February 2022	Alexandra; Jean-Philippe [Céline] (Note: The first man and woman to finish the Reward Challenge won the right to draft a tribe each. They also selected one person to draft the third tribe - and picked Céline.)	Nacpan (Note: Only the first tribe to finish would win immunity - the other two would be going to Tribal Council and voting someone out. The tribe that came last in this challenge received a curse - namely that they would immediately head to Tribal Council on Day 2. This was Ilog.)	Lili	1st Voted Out; Day 2
Episode 1	22 February 2022	Alexandra; Jean-Philippe [Céline]	Nacpan	Céline	2nd Voted Out; Day 3
Episode 2	1 March 2022	Turung	Nacpan	Franck	Left Competition; Day 4
Episode 2	1 March 2022	Ilog	Ilog	Mattéo	3rd Voted Out; Day 6
Episode 3	8 March 2022	Louana	Matingi	Samira	4th Voted Out; Day 9
Episode 3	8 March 2022	Anne-Sophie	Matingi	Samira	4th Voted Out; Day 9
Episode 4	15 March 2022	Matingi (Note: The tribe that came last in this challenge received a curse - namely that two of their tribe must be exiled for twenty-four hours and find two talismans before sundown - should they fail, their tribe will receive a disadvantage in the Immunity Challenge.)	Cadlao	Benjamin	5th Voted Out; Day 11
Episode 5	22 March 2022	Matingi (Note: The tribe that came last in this challenge received a curse - namely that they would have a twenty second time penalty in the Immunity Challenge.)	Cadlao	Stéphanie	6th Voted Out; Day 15
Episode 6	5 April 2022	Matingi (Note: The tribe that came last in this challenge received a curse - namely that they would have to live at the Abandoned Turungi Camp until the next Reward Challenge.)	Matingi	Jean-Philippe	Medically Evacuated; Day 16
Episode 6	5 April 2022	Matingi	Matingi	Stéphanie	7th Voted Out; Day 17
Episode 7	12 April 2022	Matingi	Cadlao	Alexandra	8th Voted Out; Day 20
Episode 8	19 April 2022	Cadlao (Note: The tribe that lost this challenge received a curse - namely that in the event of a tie at the Ambassadors' summit, their Ambassador would have a two-thirds chance of being eliminated in the rock draw.)	No elimination		
Episode 9	26 April 2022	None	None	Setha	9th Voted Out; Day 22
Episode 9	26 April 2022	None	Louana	Colin	10th Voted Out; Day 23
Episode 10	3 May 2022	François [Ambre]	François	Pauline	Eliminated; Day 25
Episode 10	3 May 2022	François [Ambre]	François	Yannick	11th Voted Out; Day 25
Episode 11	10 May 2022	François [Fouzi, Louana, Ambre, Bastien]	Louana	Anne-Sophie	12th Voted Out; Day 28
Episode 12 (Note: For the entirety of the twelfth episode, castaways were paired and would win challenges as a pair. In addition, the castaway voted out also brought their partner out of the game with them.)	17 May 2022	Ambre; Bastien	François; Olga	Maxime	13th Voted Out; Day 31
Episode 12	17 May 2022	Ambre; Bastien	François; Olga	Louana	Tied Destiny; Day 31
Episode 13	24 May 2022	Bastien, Ambre (Note: Bastien & Ambre were the first two to finish the Episode 13 Reward Challenge. Their reward was to pick two people to compete against the person who came last in the challenge (Olga) in a sudden death elimination challenge. The two people who won would remain in the game, while the first person to drop in that challenge would be eliminated from the game. Bastien - as winner of the challenge - also received an Immunity Idol only playable at the Episode 14 Tribal Council.)	None	Fouzi	Eliminated; Day 33
Episode 14	31 May 2022	None	Olga	Nicolas	14th Voted Out; Day 34
Episode 15	7 Jun 2022	François	Bastien	Olga	15th Voted Out; Day 37
Episode 16	14 Jun 2022	None	Jean-Charles; Géraldine; François	Ambre	Eliminated; Day 38
Episode 16	14 Jun 2022	None	Bastien (Note: Ambre & Bastien competed head-to-head in the final round of the Orientation challenge. The person who found the hidden dagger would continue onto the Final Four Perch challenge - but with the final curse of the season for that challenge - and that was Bastien. For the Perch challenge, Bastien had one less stage on his perch - meaning he would have a much smaller perch to stand on much sooner. Ambre was eliminated.)	Ambre	Eliminated; Day 38
Episode 17	21 Jun 2022	None	Géraldine (Note: As winner of the Perch challenge, Géraldine was allowed to pick one person to join her at Final Tribal Council, and she picked François. François was then allowed to pick the third finalist - and by picking Bastien, he eliminated Jean-Charles.)	Jean-Charles	16th Voted Out; Day 39
Episode 17	21 Jun 2022	None		Jury vote	
Episode 17	21 Jun 2022	None		Géraldine	Runner Up; Day 39
Episode 17	21 Jun 2022	None		Bastien	Sole Survivor; Day 39
Episode 17	21 Jun 2022	None		François	Sole Survivor; Day 39

== Voting History ==
#	Original Tribe		Swapped Tribe		Switched Tribe						Day 16 Tribe				
Episode	1		2		3	4			5	6		7			9
Voted out	Lili	Céline	Franck	Mattéo	Samira	Tie	Tie	Benjamin	Stéphanie	Jean-Philippe	Stéphanie	Tie	Tie	Alexandra	Setha
Votes	8-1	4-2-2-1	No Vote	4-3-1	6-5	4-4-2-1-1	5-5	Rock Draw (Note: After two rounds of voting, the tribe could not decide between eliminating Benjamin and Stéphanie. Both picked rocks and Benjamin drew the black rock, resulting in his elimination.)	5-3-1-1-1	No Vote	8-1-1	4-4-2	4-4	Rock Draw (Note: After two rounds of voting, the tribe could not decide between eliminating Alexandra and Sepha. Both picked rocks and Alexandra drew the black rock, resulting in her elimination.)	Consensus (Note: The two Tribal Ambassadors selected one contestant between them to be eliminated prior to the merge. Should they fail to reach a consensus, they would draw rocks to decide which of the two of them would be eliminated. They chose Setha.)
Bastien		Céline		Stéphanie		Stéphanie	Stéphanie		Stéphanie			Alexandra	Alexandra		
François	Lili				Samira						Stéphanie				
Géraldine					Pauline						Stéphanie				
Jean-Charles		Céline		Stéphanie	Samira						Stéphanie				
Ambre	Lili			Mattéo	Samira						Stéphanie				
Olga						Setha	Benjamin		Stéphanie			Setha	Setha		
Nicolas	Lili					Stéphanie	Stéphanie		Stéphanie			Alexandra	Alexandra		
Fouzi					Pauline						Stéphanie				
Louana	Lili				Samira						Stéphanie				Setha
Maxime					Pauline						Stéphanie				
Anne-Sophie		Setha		Mattéo		Benjamin	Benjamin		Setha			Setha	Setha		
Yannick		Céline		Mattéo		Benjamin	Benjamin		Olga			Alexandra	Alexandra		
Pauline	Lili				Samira						Stéphanie				
Colin						Stéphanie	Stéphanie		Stéphanie			Setha	Setha		Setha
Setha		Stéphanie				Stéphanie	Stéphanie		Stéphanie			Alexandra	Alexandra		
Alexandra						Benjamin	Benjamin		Yannick			Setha	Setha		
Stéphanie		Setha		Mattéo		Benjamin	Benjamin		Alexandra	(Note: As Jean-Philippe was medically evacuated from the game, Stephanie returned to the game as part of the Cadlao tribe)	Maxime				
Jean-Philippe	Lili				Samira										
Benjamin						Alexandra	Stéphanie								
Samira					Pauline										
Mattéo		Céline		Stéphanie											
Franck	Lili														
Céline		Stéphanie													
Lili	Pauline														
Penalty Votes	Lili (Note: As Lili was the last woman to make it to the beach in the first Reward Challenge, she received the Cursed Totem. The Cursed Totem gives her one vote every Tribal Council she attends until the first Tribal Council post-merge.)	Yannick (Note: As Yannick was the last man to make it to the beach in the first Reward Challenge, he received the Cursed Totem. The Cursed Totem gives him one vote every Tribal Council he attends until the first Tribal Council post-merge.)		Yannick	Pauline (Note: Pauline received the Cursed Totem when Lili was eliminated with it. She received a vote every Tribal Council that she attended until the first Tribal Council post-merge.)	Yannick			Yannick		Pauline	Yannick			
Penalty Votes	Lili	Yannick		Yannick (Note: Yannick received a second Cursed Totem for coming in last in the Episode 3 Reward Challenge. This Cursed Totem gives him another vote every Tribal Council he attends until the first Tribal Council post-merge.)	Pauline	Yannick			Yannick		Pauline	Yannick			

#	Merged Tribe										
Episode	9	10		11	12 (Note: Due to the Tied Destinies twist, the tribe was divided into five pairs - each identified by a different colour. These pairs are reflected in the voting table by their colours for the twelfth episode only.)		13	14	15	16	17
Voted out	Colin	Pauline	Yannick	Anne-Sophie	Maxime	Louana	Fouzi	Nicolas	Olga	Ambre	Jean-Charles
Votes	7-6-3-1	Eliminated (Note: The castaway who placed last in the Day 25 Immunity Challenge was immediately eliminated. That was Pauline.)	8-6-1	7-5	5-4-3-1	Tied Destiny	Eliminated	4-3-0 (Note: Jean-Charles played a Hidden Immunity Idol, negating two votes against him.)	3-2-2-1	Eliminated (Note: The final five took part in the Orienteering Race. The first four to finish would make up the final four, with the remaining person being eliminated.)	Eliminated
Bastien	Maxime		Louana	Maxime	Maxime			Géraldine	Géraldine	Win	No Vote
François	Colin		Yannick	Anne-Sophie	Maxime			~~Jean-Charles~~	Olga	Win	Bastien
François	Colin		Yannick	Anne-Sophie	Maxime			~~Jean-Charles~~	Olga (Note: Upon his exit, Nicolas willed an extra vote for the sixth Merged Tribal Council to François.)	Win	Bastien
Géraldine	Colin		Yannick	Anne-Sophie	Nicolas			Nicolas	Jean-Charles	Win	François
Jean-Charles	Colin		Yannick	Anne-Sophie	Fouzi		Win	Nicolas	Géraldine	Win	No Vote
Ambre	Colin		Yannick	Anne-Sophie	Maxime			~~Jean-Charles~~	Olga	Lose	
Olga	Maxime		Louana	Maxime	Maxime		Win	Nicolas	Ambre		
Olga	Maxime		Louana (Note: Upon his exit, Colin willed an extra vote for the second Merged Tribal Council to Olga.)	Maxime	Maxime (Note: Upon her exit, Anne-Sophie willed an extra vote for the fourth Merged Tribal Council to Olga.)		Win	Nicolas (Note: Olga used an Extra Vote advantage, allowing her to vote twice at the fifth Merged Tribal Council.)	Ambre		
Nicolas	Maxime		Louana	Maxime	Fouzi			Géraldine			
Nicolas	Maxime		Louana	Maxime	Fouzi			Géraldine (Note: Upon his exit, Fouzi willed an extra vote for the fifth Merged Tribal Council to Nicolas.)			
Fouzi	Colin		Yannick	Anne-Sophie	Nicolas		Lose				
Louana	Yannick		Yannick	Anne-Sophie	Fouzi						
Maxime	Colin		Yannick	Anne-Sophie	Nicolas						
Anne-Sophie	Maxime		Louana	Maxime							
Anne-Sophie	Maxime		Louana	Maxime (Note: Upon his exit, Yannick willed an extra vote for the third Merged Tribal Council to Anne-Sophie.)							
Yannick	Maxime		Louana								
Pauline	Colin										
Colin	Maxime										
Penalty Votes	Pauline		Fouzi; Yannick (Note: For finishing last in the Day 24 Reward Challenge, Fouzi & Yannick each received a penalty vote for the next Tribal Council.)		Jean-Charles; Nicolas (Note: For finishing last in the Reward Challenge, Jean-Charles & Nicolas each received a penalty vote for the next Tribal Council.)				Jean-Charles (Note: For finishing last in the Immunity Challenge, Jean-Charles received a penalty vote for the next Tribal Council.)		
Penalty Votes	Yannick		Fouzi; Yannick		Jean-Charles; Nicolas				Jean-Charles		
Penalty Votes	Yannick		Fouzi; Yannick		Jean-Charles; Nicolas				Jean-Charles		

Jury vote
Episode #	Finale		
Day #	40		
Finalist	Bastien	François	Géraldine
Votes	4-4-3		
Juror	Vote		
Jean-Charles	Bastien		
Ambre		François	
Olga			Géraldine
Nicolas		François	
Fouzi		François	
Louana			Géraldine
Maxime			Géraldine
Anne-Sophie	Bastien		
Yannick	Bastien		
Pauline		François	
Colin	Bastien		
