= Koh-Lanta: Malaisie =

- Season 12
- Presented by: Denis Brogniart
- No. of days: 42
- No. of castaways: 20
- Winner: Ugo Lartiche
- Runner-up: Brice Martinet
- Location: Seribuat, Malaysia

Release
- Original network: TF1
- Original release: 2 November 2012 – 1 February 2013

Season chronology
- ← Previous; La Revanche des Héros Next → Koh-Lanta: Season 13 (cancelled); La Nouvelle Édition

Koh-Lanta: Malaisie (transl. "Koh-Lanta: Malaysia") is the twelfth regular season and the fifteenth season overall of the French reality television series Koh-Lanta. This season has 20 contestants compete in two tribes of twenty in Seribuat, Malaysia competing in challenges for rewards & immunity to avoid going to tribal council to vote off one of their own. The main twist this season is after the first challenges, the contestants do a schoolyard pick until there's 4 left. The 4 not selected are banished to another island until the first tribal council where they'll return and reintegrate with the two tribes. The season premiered on 2 November 2012 & concluded on 1 February 2013 where Ugo Lartiche won against Brice Martinet in a 10-1 jury vote to win €100,000 & win the title of Sole Survivor.

== Contestants ==
| Contestant | Original Tribe | Episode 2 Tribe | Episode 4 Tribe | Merged Tribe | Finish |
|---|---|---|---|---|---|
| Mélanie Boimare; 30, Asnières-sur-Seine | Mawar | | | | 1st Voted Out; Day 3 |
| Mickaël Kalfallah; 57, Grenay | Mawar | Mawar | | | 2nd Voted Out; Day 6 |
| Élodie Sadeler; Returned to Game | Banished | Sungaï | | | 3rd Voted Out; Day 9 |
| Sara Tallon; 42, Grimaud | Mawar | Mawar | | | Medically Evacuated; Day 11 |
| Nadine De Carpentry; 57, Vétraz-Monthoux | Banished | Mawar | Mawar | | 4th Voted Out; Day 12 |
| Élodie Sadeler; 36, Ansac-sur-Vienne | Banished | Sungaï | Mawar | | 5th Voted Out; Day 15 |
| Marie Parmentier; 23, Brussels, Belgium | Sungaï | Sungaï | Sungaï | | 6th Voted Out; Day 18 |
| Anthony Dito; 24, Marseille | Mawar | Mawar | Mawar | | 7th Voted Out; Day 20 |
| Javier Rodriguez; 39, Brussels, Belgium | Sungaï | Sungaï | Sungaï | Koh-Lanta | 8th Voted Out; 1st Jury Member; Day 21 |
| Namadia Thaï Thaï; 28, L'Haÿ-les-Roses | Mawar | Mawar | Mawar | Koh-Lanta | 9th Voted Out; 2nd Jury Member; Day 25 |
| Marylou Sidibé; 22, Aubervilliers | Mawar | Mawar | Mawar | Koh-Lanta | 10th Voted Out; 3rd Jury Member; Day 28 |
| Catherine Perez; 41, Véron | Sungaï | Sungaï | Sungaï | Koh-Lanta | 11th Voted Out; 4th Jury Member; Day 31 |
| Camille Sold; 18, Strasbourg | Sungaï | Sungaï | Sungaï | Koh-Lanta | 12th Voted Out; 5th Jury Member; Day 31 |
| Thierry Villette; Returned to Game | Mawar | Mawar | Mawar | Koh-Lanta | 13th Voted Out; Day 34 |
| Charles Clément; 20, Chevreuse | Sungaï | Sungaï | Sungaï | Koh-Lanta | Medically Evacuated; 6th Jury Member; Day 37 |
| Thierry Villette; 44, Beausoleil | Mawar | Mawar | Mawar | Koh-Lanta | 14th Voted Out; 7th Jury Member; Day 37 |
| Myriam Modde; 34, Soissons | Mawar | Mawar | Mawar | Koh-Lanta | 15th Voted Out; 8th Jury Member; Day 39 |
| Bernard Deniaud †; 60, Saint-Lyphard | Banished | Mawar | Mawar | Koh-Lanta | Lost Challenge; 9th Jury Member; Day 40 |
| Philippe Bizet; 41, Freulleville | Banished | Sungaï | Sungaï | Koh-Lanta | Lost Challenge; 10th Jury Member; Day 40 |
| Vanessa Alvarez; 37, Arès | Sungaï | Sungaï | Sungaï | Koh-Lanta | 16th Voted Out; 11th Jury Member; Day 41 |
| Brice Martinet; 30, Orléans | Sungaï | Sungaï | Sungaï | Koh-Lanta | Runner-up; Day 42 |
| Ugo Lartiche; 30, Perpignan | Sungaï | Sungaï | Sungaï | Koh-Lanta | Sole Survivor; Day 42 |

== Elimination table ==
| | Original tribe | | | | Merged tribe | | | | | | | | | | | | | | | | | |
|---|---|---|---|---|---|---|---|---|---|---|---|---|---|---|---|---|---|---|---|---|---|---|
| Episode : | 1 | 2 | 3 | 4 | | 5 | 6 | 7 | | 8 | 9 | 10 | | 11 | 12 | | 13 | 14 | | | second | winner |
| Eliminated : | Mélanie | Mickaël | Elodie | Sara | Nadine | Elodie | Marie | Anthony | Javier | Namadia | Marylou | Catherine | Camille | Thierry | Charles | Thierry | Myriam | Bernard | Philippe | Vanessa | Brice | Ugo |
| Votes : | 6/8 | 6/10 | 7/10 | 0 (Note: Suffering from a double ear infection, Sara was forced to withdraw.) | 5/9 | 5/8 | 6/10 | 0 (Note: Thierry, having found an immunity idol, uses it during the tribal council, thus canceling the votes against him as well as those against Myriam, his partner. Therefore, Catherine is eliminated..) | 5/15 | 6/12 | 6/12 | 3/11 (Note: Anthony and Javier were chosen as ambassadors by the emissaries. Unable to agree on which adventurer to eliminate, a draw was held, resulting in Anthony's elimination.) | 0 (Note: Since Camille was paired with Catherine, she was also eliminated.) | 5/9 | 0 (Note: Charles, exhausted, is evacuated to the infirmary and will not return to the adventure.) | 5/8 | 4/7 (Note: Philippe, having found an immunity necklace, uses it during this council but it changes nothing because no one had voted against him.) | 0 (Note: Bernard is eliminated during the orientation challenge.) | 0 (Note: Philippe is eliminated during the orientation challenge.) | 1 | 1/11 | 10/11 |
| Candidats | Votes | | | | | | | | | | | | | | | | | | | | | |
| Ugo | | | Elodie | | | | Charles | | ~~Namadia~~ | Namadia | Philippe | ~~Myriam~~ | | Thierry | | Thierry | Myriam | | | Vanessa | Jury final | |
| Brice | | | Elodie | | | | Camille | | ~~Namadia~~ | Namadia | Marylou | ~~Myriam~~ | | Thierry | | Thierry | Myriam | | | | Jury final | |
| Vanessa | | | Elodie | | | | Marie | | ~~Namadia~~ | Namadia | Marylou | Bernard | | Thierry | | Thierry | Brice | | | | Brice | |
| Philippe | Exiled | | Marie | | | | Marie | | Marylou | Thierry | Marylou | ~~Myriam~~ | | Thierry | | Thierry | Myriam | | | | | Ugo |
| Bernard | Exiled | Mickaël | | | Myriam | Myriam | | | Javier | Brice | Philippe | Catherine | | Myriam | | Thierry | Myriam | | | | | Ugo |
| Myriam | Mickaël | Mickaël | | | Nadine | Elodie | | | Javier | Brice | Brice | Catherine | | Charles | | Brice | Bernard | | | | | Ugo |
| Thierry | Mélanie | Mickaël | | | Nadine | Elodie | | | Javier | Brice | Brice | Catherine | | Myriam | | Brice/Brice (Note: Thierry's black vote is counted in the council, so he has two votes.) | Bernard | | | | | Ugo |
| Charles | | | Elodie | | | | Marie | | ~~Namadia~~ | Namadia | Marylou | ~~Myriam~~ | | Thierry | Eliminated | | | | | | | Ugo |
| Camille | | | Elodie | | | | Marie | | Bernard | Bernard | Marylou | ~~Myriam~~ | | | | | | | | | | Ugo |
| Catherine | | | Elodie | | | | Marie | | ~~Namadia~~ | Namadia | Marylou | ~~Myriam~~ | | ~~Myriam~~ | | | | | | | | Ugo |
| Marylou | Mélanie | Bernard | | | Nadine | Elodie | | | Javier | (Note: Evacuated to the infirmary due to her poor health, Marylou did not participate in the immunity challenge. Consequently, she is untouchable but cannot vote at this tribal council.) | Brice | ~~Philippe~~ | | | | | | | | | | Ugo |
| Namadia | Mélanie | Bernard | | | Nadine | Elodie | | | Javier | Brice | Brice | | | | | | | | | | | Ugo |
| Javier | | | Elodie | | | | Charles | | ~~Namadia~~ | Namadia | | | | | | | | | | | | Ugo |
| Anthony | Mélanie | Bernard | | | Nadine | Elodie | | Eliminated | | | | | | | | | | | | | | |
| Marie | | | Philippe | | | | Charles | | ~~Philippe~~ | | | | | | | | | | | | | |
| Elodie | Exiled | | Charles | | Myriam | Myriam | Marie | | Myriam | | | | | | | | | | | | | |
| Nadine | Exiled | Mickaël| | | | Myriam | Myriam | | | | | | | | | | | | | | | | |
| Sara | Mélanie | Mickaël | | Eliminated | | | | | | | | | | | | | | | | | | |
| Mickaël | Mélanie | Bernard | | | ~~Sara~~ | | | | | | | | | | | | | | | | | |
| Mélanie | Mickaël | Mickaël | | | | | | | | | | | | | | | | | | | | |

Notes :

- A black background indicates the black vote.

== Future appearances ==
Sara Tallon & Philippe Bizet returned in Koh-Lanta: La Nouvelle Édition. Javier Rodriguez returned in Koh-Lanta: Le Combat des Héros. Tallon competed again in Koh-Lanta: L'Île des héros. Brice Martinet competed in the Italian version of Koh-Lanta in 2015 called L'Isola dei Famosi where he finished again as the Runner-up. Bizet returned for a third time alongside Namadia Thaï Thaï and Ugo Lartiche for Koh-Lanta: La Légende. Lartiche returned for a third and a fourth time for Koh-Lanta: La Tribu Maudite and, alongside Camille Sold, for Koh-Lanta: All Stars.
