= Koh-Lanta: La Tribu Maudite =

Season of Koh-Lanta

- Season 26
- Presented by: Denis Brogniart
- No. of days: 41
- No. of castaways: 24
- Winner: Thibault Bélanger
- Runner-up: Charlotte Rasquin
- Location: Caramoan, Philippines

Release
- Original network: TF1
- Original release: 20 August – 3 December 2024

Season chronology
- ← Previous; Les Chasseurs d'Immunité Next → La Revanche des 4 Terres

Koh-Lanta: La Tribu Maudite (transl. "Koh-Lanta: The Cursed Tribe") is the twenty-sixth regular season and the thirty-first season overall of the French reality television series Koh-Lanta. The season is filmed on Caramoan in the Philippines where for 41 days, 24 contestants compete in tribes against each other for food, rewards, immunity and to avoid tribal council. The main twists this season is that one tribe is 'cursed'. After the first challenge, the tribe that finishes last will receive a 'curse' that impedes on their performance in the next challenge. In addition, another twist is that of the contestants, two are former winners of the game, leading two tribes as the captains. The season is hosted again by Denis Brogniart and premiered on 20 August 2024 on TF1. The season concluded with a live finale on 3 December 2024 where Thibault Bélanger won against Charlotte Rasquin in a 9-4 jury vote to win the grand prize and the title of Sole Survivor.

== Contestants ==
Contestant	Original Tribe	Episode 2 Tribe	Episode 5 Tribe	Merged Tribe	Finish	Cursed Island
Cécile Guy; 34, Annecy	Sabitang				1st Voted Out; Day 3	
Ari Bentolila; 51, Puteaux	Pitogo	Pitogo			2nd Voted Out; Day 6	
Marie Vilaseca; 29, Paris	Pitogo	Pitogo			3rd Voted Out; Day 9	
Lola Potabes; 25, Le Lamentin, Martinique	Sabitang	Sabitang			4th Voted Out; Day 12	
Vanessa Feuillatte; 39, Bordeaux	Cursed Tribe	Cursed Tribe			Lost Challenge; Day 13	
Nathanaël Branchereau; 27, Carquefou	Cursed Tribe	Cursed Tribe			Lost Challenge; Day 13	
Alexandre Cheron; 33, Paris	Pitogo	Pitogo			Quit; Day 13	
Michel Huy; 36, Lausanne, Switzerland	Sabitang	Sabitang	Sabitang		5th Voted Out; Day 15	
Mélissa Pierru; 35, Fréjus	Cursed Tribe	Cursed Tribe	Sabitang		6th Voted Out; Day 17	
Emmanuelle Boisseau; 45, Angoulême	Sabitang	Cursed Tribe	Pitogo		Eliminated; 1st Jury Member; Day 19	
Fabrice Giordano; 40, Alba-la-Romaine	Sabitang	Sabitang	Sabitang	Koh-Lanta	7th Voted Out; 2nd Jury Member; Day 21	
Maud Collas; 38, Le Perreux-sur-Marne	Pitogo	Pitogo	Pitogo	Koh-Lanta	Lost Challenge; 3rd Jury Member; Day 22	
Sarah Aboudeine; 32, Nantes	Pitogo	Pitogo	Pitogo	Koh-Lanta	8th Voted Out; 4th Jury Member; Day 24	
Frédéric Khouvilay; 35, Le Plessis-Robinson; Le Feu Sacré	Sabitang	Sabitang	Sabitang	Koh-Lanta	9th Voted Out; 5th Jury Member; Day 27	
Maxim Iarkov; 28, Paris	Pitogo	Pitogo	Pitogo	Koh-Lanta	10th Voted Out; Day 30	Lost Duel; 6th Jury Member; Day 31
Cassandre Lambert; Returned to Game	Pitogo	Pitogo	Pitogo	Koh-Lanta	Eliminated; ~~7th Jury Member~~; Day 30	Won Duel; Day 31
Gustin Comanescu; 26, Cheseaux-Noréaz, Switzerland	Pitogo	Pitogo	Pitogo	Koh-Lanta	11th Voted Out; 7th Jury Member; Day 33	
Cassandre Lambert; 23, Lyon	Pitogo	Pitogo	Pitogo	Koh-Lanta	12th Voted Out; 8th Jury Member; Day 36	
Sophia Mansouri; 36, Clichy	Sabitang	Sabitang	Sabitang	Koh-Lanta	Lost Challenge; 9th Jury Member; Day 39	
Ugo Latriche; 42, Cases-de-Pène; Malaisie & La Légende	Pitogo	Pitogo	Pitogo	Koh-Lanta	13th Voted Out; 10th Jury Member; Day 39	
Jacques Roque; 38, Royan	Sabitang	Sabitang	Sabitang	Koh-Lanta	Lost Challenge; 11th Jury Member; Day 40	
Cécile Belec; 41, Pusey	Pitogo	Pitogo	Pitogo	Koh-Lanta	Lost Challenge; 12th Jury Member; Day 40	
Ilyesse Benyoub; 23, Clichy-sous-Bois	Cursed Tribe	Sabitang	Sabitang	Koh-Lanta	14th Voted Out; 13th Jury Member; Day 41	
Charlotte Rasquin; 28, Ciney, Belgium	Sabitang	Sabitang	Sabitang	Koh-Lanta	Runner-up; Day 41	
Thibault Bélanger; 34, Bonifacio	Sabitang	Sabitang	Sabitang	Koh-Lanta	Sole Survivor; Day 41	

== Future appearances ==
Jacques Roque and Charlotte Rasquin returned for Koh-Lanta: All Stars.

== Challenges ==
Episode	Air date	Challenges		Eliminated	Finish	
Episode	Air date	Reward	Immunity	Eliminated	Finish	
Episode 1	20 August 2024	None	Pitogo	Cécile G.	1st Voted Out; Day 3	
Episode 2	27 August 2024	Pitogo	Sabitang	Ari	2nd Voted Out; Day 6	
Episode 3	3 September 2024	Pitogo	Sabitang	Marie	3rd Voted Out; Day 9	
Episode 4	10 September 2024	Sabitang	Pitogo	Lola	4th Voted Out; Day 12	
Episode 5	17 September 2024	Pitogo	Pitogo	Vanessa	Lost Challenge; Day 13	
Episode 5	17 September 2024	Pitogo	Pitogo	Nathanaël	Lost Challenge; Day 13	
Episode 5	17 September 2024	Pitogo	Pitogo	Alexandre	Quit; Day 13	
Episode 5	17 September 2024	Pitogo	Pitogo	Michel	5th Voted Out; Day 15	
Episode 6	24 September 2024	Pitogo	Pitogo	Mélissa	6th Voted Out; Day 17	
Episode 7	1 October 2024	Sabitang		Emanuelle	Eliminated; 1st Jury Member; Day 19	
Episode 8	8 October 2024		Gustin	Fabrice	7th Voted Out; 2nd Jury Member; Day 21	
Episode 9	15 October 2024	Frédéric	Ugo	Maud	Lost Challenge; 3rd Jury Member; Day 22	
Episode 9	15 October 2024	Frédéric	Ugo	Sarah	8th Voted Out; 4th Jury Member; Day 24	
Episode 10	22 October 2024	Frédéric	Charlotte	Frédéric	9th Voted Out; 5th Jury Member; Day 27	
Episode 11	29 October 2024	Ilyesse, Ugo	Ilyesse, Ugo	Maxim	10th Voted Out; 6th Jury Member; Day 30	
Episode 11	29 October 2024	Ilyesse, Ugo	Ilyesse, Ugo	Cassandre	Eliminated; ~~7th Jury Member~~; Day 30	
Episode 12	5 November 2024	Charlotte, Ilyesse	Charlotte	Gustin	11th Voted Out; 7th Jury Member; Day 33	
Episode 13	12 November 2024	Charlotte, Ilyesse, Jacques, Sophia	Jacques	Cassandre	12th Voted Out; 8th Jury Member; Day 36	
Episode 14	19 November 2024	Thibault	Ilyesse	Ugo	13th Voted Out; 9th Jury Member; Day 38	
		Orienteering Challenge	Poles Challenge	Final Council		
épisode 15 (Note: Orienteering Challenge)	26 Noveamber 2024	Thibault, Ilyesse et Charlotte	Charlotte	Thibault	9-4	Vainqueur
episode 16	3 december 2024	Thibault, Ilyesse et Charlotte	Charlotte	Thibault	9-4	Vainqueur

== Voting history ==
#	Original Tribe	Episode 2 Tribe								Episode 5 Tribe			Merged Tribe															
Episode	1	2	3		4		5				6	7	8		9		10	11		12		13		14		15		16
Voted out	Cécile G.	Ari	Marie		Lola		Vanessa	Nathanaël	Alexandre	Michel	Mélissa	Emmanuelle	Fabrice		Maud	Sarah	Frédéric	Maxim	Cassandre	Maxim	Gustin	Cassandre		Sophia	Ugo	Jacques	Cécile B.	Ilyesse
Votes	6-3-1	6-4	4-4-1	5-4	3-3-3	7-2	Challenge		0	3-0 (Note: Mélissa played an immunity necklace on herself, negating six votes against her.)	6-1-1	2	7-7 (Note: Ilyesse and Mélissa both played an immunity necklace on themselves but did not receive any votes against them.)	Rock Draw (Note: After two rounds of voting, the tribe could not decide between eliminating Fabrice and Sarah. Both picked rocks and Fabrice drew the black rock, resulting in his elimination.)	Challenge	7-5	7-5	6-5	Tied Destiny (Note: For the entire episode, the contestants were divided into pairs. If one of them won immunity, their partner won immunity, if one was voted out, the other was voted out.)	Challenge (Note: After the Tied Destinies twist, a duel were held on the Cursed Tribe island between Cassandre and Maxim of the Tied Destinies twist.)	4-2-1-0 (Note: Ugo played an immunity necklace on Cassandre, negating four votes against her.)	3-3-0	5-3	Challenge	5-2	Challenge	Challenge	1-0
Thibault	Cécile G.				Charlotte	Lola				~~Mélissa~~	Mélissa		Sarah			Sarah	Ugo	Jacques			~~Cassandre~~	~~Ugo~~	Cassandre		Ugo	Won		None
Charlotte	Cécile G.				Michel	Lola				Michel	Mélissa		Sarah			None (Note: As Charlotte was under medical supervision during the Immunity Challenge and therefore did not participate in it, she was immune at the Tribal Council, but was unable to cast a vote.)	Frédéric	Maxim			~~Cassandre~~	Cassandre	Cassandre		Ugo	Won		Ilyesse
Ilyesse					Lola	Lola				~~Mélissa~~	Charlotte		Sarah			Sarah	Ugo	Maxim			Cécile B.	~~Ugo~~	Cassandre		Ugo	Won		None
Cécile B.		Ari	Alexandre	Alexandre									Fabrice			Frédéric	Frédéric	Maxim			Gustin	Ilyesse	Ilyesse		Ugo	Lose		
Jacques	Emmanuelle				Charlotte	Lola				~~Mélissa~~	Mélissa		Sarah			Sarah	Ugo	Maxim			~~Cassandre~~	Cassandre	Cassandre		Ugo	Lose		
Ugo		Marie	Marie	Alexandre									Fabrice			Frédéric	Frédéric	Jacques			Gustin	Ilyesse	Ilyesse		Charlotte			
Sophia	Cécile G.				Michel	Michel				Michel	Mélissa	Emmanuelle	Sarah			Sarah	Frédéric	Maxim			~~Cassandre~~	Cassandre	Cassandre					
Cassandre		Ari	Alexandre	Alexandre									Fabrice			Frédéric	Frédéric	Jacques		Won	Gustin	Ilyesse	Ilyesse					
Gustin		Marie	Marie	Marie								Emmanuelle	Sarah			Sarah	Ugo	Jacques			Cécile B.							
Maxim		Marie	Alexandre	Marie									Fabrice			Frédéric	Frédéric	Jacques		Lose								
Frédéric	Emmanuelle				Charlotte	Lola				~~Mélissa~~	Mélissa		Sarah			Sarah	Ugo											
Sarah		Ari	Marie	Marie									Fabrice	Won		Frédéric												
Maud		Ari	Marie	Marie									Fabrice		Lost													
Fabrice	Cécile G.				Lola	Lola				~~Mélissa~~	Mélissa		Sarah	Lost														
Emmanuelle	Cécile G.						Won																					
Mélissa								Won		Michel	Frédéric																	
Michel	Emmanuelle				Lola	Lola				~~Mélissa~~																		
Alexandre		Ari	Ugo	Marie																								
Nathanaël								Lost																				
Vanessa							Lost																					
Lola	Cécile G.				Michel	Michel																						
Marie		Ari	Alexandre	Alexandre																								
Ari		Marie																										
Cécile G.	Fabrice																											
Penalty																					Jacques (Note: Jacques is penalized by one vote, because he finishes last in the immunity test.)							
Black Vote																Sarah (Note: Upon his exit, Fabrice willed an extra vote for the second Merged Tribal Council to Thibault.)	Frédéric (Note: Upon her exit, Sarah willed an extra vote for the third Merged Tribal Council to Ugo.)	Maxim (Note: Upon his exit, Frédéric willed an extra vote for the forth Merged Tribal Council to Maxim.)			Gustin (Note: Upon his exit, Maxim willed an extra vote for the fifth Merged Tribal Council to Gustin.)	~~Ugo~~ (Note: Upon his exit, Gustin willed an extra vote for the sixth Merged Tribal Council to Ugo.)			Charlotte (Note: Upon his exit, Cassandre willed an extra vote for the seventh Merged Tribal Council to Charlotte.)			

Jury vote
Episode #	17	
Day #	41	
Finalist	Charlotte	Thibault
Vote	9-4	
Juror	Vote	
Ilyesse		Thibault
Cécile B.	Charlotte	
Jacques		Thibault
Ugo		Thibault
Sophia	Charlotte	
Cassandre	Charlotte	
Gustin		Thibault
Maxim	Charlotte	
Frédéric		Thibault
Sarah		Thibault
Maud		Thibault
Fabrice		Thibault
Emmanuelle		Thibault
