= Koh-Lanta: Les Chasseurs d'Immunité =

Season of Koh-Lanta

- Season 25
- Presented by: Denis Brogniart
- No. of days: 38
- No. of castaways: 22
- Winner: Léa Sahin
- Runner-up: Meïssa Seck
- Location: Luzon, Caramoan, Philippines
- No. of episodes: 16

Release
- Original network: TF1
- Original release: 13 February – 4 June 2024

Season chronology
- ← Previous; Le Feu Sacré Next → La Tribu Maudite

Koh-Lanta: Les Chasseurs d'Immunité (transl. "Koh-Lanta: The Immunity Hunters") is the twenty-fifth regular season and the thirtieth season overall of the French reality television series Koh-Lanta. The season was filmed in Luzon, Philippines where 20 contestants were divided into two tribes of ten competing in challenges to win the grand prize of €100,000. The main twist this season are the hidden immunity idols, which are now hidden all over the game such as: at immunity challenges, in the sea, in camp, in areas that are well-hidden. More-so than in previous seasons. The season aired on TF1 and premiered on 13 February 2024. The season concluded on 4 June 2024 where Léa Sahin won in an 8-3 jury vote against Meïssa Seck to win the grand prize and be crowned the title of Sole Survivor.

== Contestants ==
Contestant	Original Tribe	Intruders Enter	Merged Tribe	Finish
Steve Grenier; 34, Perpignan	Kadasi			1st Voted Out; Day 3
Alicia Bouly; 23, Feillens	Matukad	Matukad		2nd Voted Out; Day 6
Nathalie Suhard; 55, Paris	Kadasi	Kadasi		Lost Duel; Day 7
William Plancq; 62, Itteville		Kadasi		3rd Voted Out; Day 9
Alexis Tchernychev; 21, Cahors	Kadasi	Kadasi		4th Voted Out; Day 12
Émilie Clavis; 45, Narbonne	Matukad	Matukad		5th Voted Out; Day 14
Sarah Diawara; 34, Biguglia	Kadasi	Kadasi		6th Voted Out; Day 17
Maxime Barbet; 43, Francheville	Matukad	Matukad		7th Voted Out; Day 20
Ricky Poyet; 23, Rivesaltes	Matukad	Matukad		Eliminated; Day 22
Léa Notardonato; 22, Sète		Matukad	Koh-Lanta	8th Voted Out; 1st Jury Member; Day 23
Océane Montenegro; 35, Serbannes	Kadasi	Kadasi	Koh-Lanta	Eliminated; 2nd Jury Member; Day 26
Cécile Poprawa; 41, Boulogne-Billancourt	Matukad	Matukad	Koh-Lanta	9th Voted Out; 3rd Jury Member; Day 26
Sébastien Cazaux; Returned to Game	Kadasi	Kadasi	Koh-Lanta	10th Voted Out; Removed from Jury; Day 29
Aurélien Dulau; 37, Cenon-sur-Vienne	Kadasi	Kadasi	Koh-Lanta	Eliminated; 4th Jury Member; Day 29
Jean Belmonte; 26, Les Monts d'Aunay	Matukad	Matukad	Koh-Lanta	Medically Evacuated; 5th Jury Member; Day 32
Mégane Rouland; 28, Aubange, Belgium	Matukad	Matukad	Koh-Lanta	12th Voted Out; 6th Jury Member; Day 32
David Murail; 36, Illkirch-Graffenstaden	Matukad	Matukad	Koh-Lanta	13th Voted Out; 7th Jury Member; Day 34
Sébastien Cazaux; 30, Pau	Kadasi	Kadasi	Koh-Lanta	14th Voted Out; 8th Jury Member; Day 36
Amri Madani; 42, Bagnolet	Kadasi	Kadasi	Koh-Lanta	Lost Challenge; 9th Jury Member; Day 37
Pauline Bonneil; 29, Castelginest	Kadasi	Kadasi	Koh-Lanta	Lost Challenge; 10th Jury Member; Day 37
Julie Rignault; 37, Rouy	Matukad	Matukad	Koh-Lanta	15th Voted Out; 11th Jury Member; Day 38
Meïssa Seck; 29, Châtillon	Matukad	Matukad	Koh-Lanta	Runner-up; Day 38
Léa Sahin; 40, Nanterre	Kadasi	Kadasi	Koh-Lanta	Sole Survivor; Day 38

== Challenges ==
Episode	Air date	Challenges		Eliminated	Finish
Episode	Air date	Reward	Immunity	Eliminated	Finish
Episode 1	13 February 2024	Kadasi	Matukad	Steve	1st Voted Out; Day 3
Episode 2	20 February 2024	Kadasi	Kadasi	Alicia	2nd Voted Out; Day 6
Episode 3	27 February 2024	Ricky (Note: The Reward Challenge was an individual challenge which Ricky won.)	Matukad	Nathalie	Lost Duel; Day 7
Episode 3	27 February 2024	Ricky	Matukad	William	3rd Voted Out; Day 9
Episode 4	5 March 2024	Matukad	Matukad	Alexis	4th Voted Out; Day 12
Episode 5	12 March 2024	Kadasi	Kadasi	Émilie	5th Voted Out; Day 14
Episode 6	19 March 2024	Matukad	Matukad	Sarah	6th Voted Out; Day 17
Episode 7	2 April 2024	Kadasi	Kadasi	Maxime	7th Voted Out; Day 20
Episode 8	9 April 2024	Kadasi		Ricky (Note: As ambassadors for their tribes, Léa N. and Pauline had to agree on a contestant to be eliminated. They chose to eliminate Ricky.)	Eliminated; Day 22
Episode 9	16 April 2024		Jean	Léa N.	8th Voted Out; 1st Jury Member; Day 23
Episode 10	23 April 2024	Amri	Jean	Océane	Lost Challenge; 2nd Jury Member; Day 25
Episode 10	23 April 2024	Amri	Jean	Cécile	9th Voted Out; 3rd Jury Member; Day 25
Episode 11	30 April 2024	Jean & Mégane	Jean & Mégane	Sébastien	10th Voted Out; ~~4th Jury Member~~; Day 29 (Note: Due to Jean being medically evacuated. Sébastien and Aurélien competed in a duel to replace Jean and in turn be removed from the jury.)
Episode 11	30 April 2024	Jean & Mégane	Jean & Mégane	Aurélien	Tied Destiny; 4th Jury Member; Day 29
Episode 12	7 May 2024	Amri	Léa S.	Jean	Medically Evacuated; 5th Jury Member; Day 32
Episode 12	7 May 2024	Amri	Léa S.	Mégane	11th Voted Out; 6th Jury Member; Day 32
Episode 13	14 May 2024	Sébastien	Meïssa	David	12th Voted Out; 7th Jury Member; Day 34
Episode 14	21 May 2024	Meïssa	Meïssa	Sébastien	13th Voted Out; 8th Jury Member; Day 36
Episode 15	28 May 2024		Julie, Léa S. & Meïssa	Amri	Lost Challenge; 9th Jury Member; Day 37
Episode 15	28 May 2024		Julie, Léa S. & Meïssa	Pauline	Lost Challenge; 10th Jury Member; Day 37
Episode 16	4 June 2024		Léa S.	Julie	14th Voted Out; 11th Jury Member; Day 38
Episode 16	4 June 2024			Jury vote	
Episode 16	4 June 2024			Meïssa	Runner-Up; Day 38
Episode 16	4 June 2024			Léa S.	Sole Survivor; Day 38

== Voting history ==
#	Original Tribe	Intruders Enter								Merged Tribe												
Episode	1	2	3		4	5	6	7	8	9	10		11		12		13		14	15		16
Voted out	Steve	Alicia	Nathalie	William	Alexis	Émilie	Sarah	Maxime	Ricky	Léa N.	Océane	Cécile	Sébastien	Aurélien	Jean	Mégane	David		Sébastien	Amri	Pauline	Julie
Votes	6-4	8-3	Duel	8-1	5-2-0 (Note: Pauline played an immunity necklace on herself and Léa negating one vote against Léa.)	8-0 (Note: Julie played an immunity necklace on Léa N. negating two votes against her.)	4-3	6-2-0 (Note: Cécile played an immunity necklace on David negating one against him.)	2	6-0	Challenge	5-0 (Note: Amri played an immunity necklace on himself negating seven votes against him.)	6-3-2	Tied Destiny (Note: For the entire episode, the contestants were divided into pairs. If one of them won immunity, their partner won immunity, if one was voted out, the other was voted out.)	0	4-2-1-0 (Note: Amri played an immunity necklace on himself negating two votes against him.)	4-4 (Note: As Amri and David tied, the black vote that was cast by Mégane wasn't counted in the revote.)	4-3	5-3-1 (Note: Meïssa played a cursed necklace on himself allowing him to vote twice.)	Challenge	Challenge	1
Léa S.	Steve			William	Sarah		Sarah			Léa N.		Cécile	Sébastien			Mégane	David	David	Julie	Won		Julie
Meïssa		Alicia				Émilie		Maxime		~~Océane~~		~~Amri~~	Sébastien			Julie	David	David	Sébastien (x2)	Won		
Julie		Alicia				Émilie		Maxime		~~Océane~~		~~Amri~~	Sébastien			~~Amri~~	Amri	Amri	Sébastien	Won		
Pauline	Steve			William	Sarah		Océane		Ricky	Léa N.		Cécile	Sébastien			Mégane	David	David	Sébastien	Lost		
Amri	Nathalie		Won	William	Alexis		Sarah			Léa N.		Cécile	Sébastien			Mégane	David	David	Sébastien	Lost		
Sébastien	Nathalie			William	Alexis		Sarah			Léa N.		Cécile	Meïssa			Mégane	Amri	Amri	Julie			
David		Julie				Émilie		Léa N.		~~Océane~~		~~Amri~~	Pauline			Meïssa	Amri	Amri	Julie			
Mégane		Julie				Émilie		Maxime		~~Océane~~		~~Amri~~	Sébastien			~~Amri~~	Amri					
Jean		Alicia				Émilie		Maxime		~~Océane~~		~~Amri~~	Meïssa									
Aurélien	Steve			William	Alexis		Océane			Léa N.		Cécile	Meïssa									
Cécile		Alicia				~~Léa N.~~		Maxime		~~Océane~~		~~Amri~~	Pauline									
Océane	Steve			William	Alexis		Sarah			Léa N.	Lost											
Léa N.		Alicia				Émilie		Maxime	Ricky	~~Océane~~		~~Amri~~										
Ricky		Alicia				Émilie		Léa N.														
Maxime		Alicia				Émilie		~~David~~														
Sarah	Nathalie			William	Alexis		Océane															
Émilie		Alicia				~~Léa N.~~																
Alexis	Steve			William	~~Léa S.~~																	
William				Léa S.																		
Nathalie	Steve		Lost																			
Alicia		Julie																				
Steve	Nathalie																					
Penalty Votes																Meïssa (Note: For finishing last in the reward challenge, Meïssa was given a penalty vote against him at the next tribal council.)			Amri (Note: As Amri finished last at the reward challenge, he was given a penalty vote against him at the next tribal council.)			

Jury vote
Episode #	16	
Day #	38	
Finalist	Léa S.	Meïssa
Vote	8-3	
Juror	Vote	
Julie		Meïssa
Pauline	Léa S.	
Amri		Meïssa
Sébastien	Léa S.	
David	Léa S.	
Mégane		Meïssa
Jean	Léa S.	
Aurélien	Léa S.	
Cécile	Léa S.	
Océane	Léa S.	
Léa N.	Léa S.	
