= Koh-Lanta: Les Reliques du Destin =

- Season 28
- Presented by: Denis Brogniart
- No. of days: 39
- No. of castaways: 20
- Winner: Cynthia Combes
- Runner-up: Clarisse Cresseveur
- Location: Caramoan, Philippines
- No. of episodes: 15

Release
- Original network: TF1
- Original release: 3 March – 23 June 2026

Season chronology
- ← Previous; La Revanche des 4 Terres Next → All Stars

Koh-Lanta: Les Reliques du Destin (transl. "Koh-Lanta: The Relics of Destiny") is the twenty-eighth regular season and the thirty-third season overall of the French reality television series Koh-Lanta. The season once again is filmed in Caramoan, Philippines where 20 contestants compete for €100,000 and the title of Sole Survivor. The main twist this season is once a contestant is voted off, they are a given a choice of eight relics to smash, some mean instant elimination as usual, some begin a duel where the contestant voted out has a chance to return and one where they can switch tribes. The season premieres on TF1 on 3 March 2026.

== Contestants ==
List of Koh-Lanta: Les Reliques du Destin contestants
Contestant	Original Tribe	Switched Tribe	Merged Tribe	Finish
Françoise Fournier-Grigis; 40, Saint-Gérard, Belgium	Lahoy			Lost Challenge; Day 3
Clémence Dubent; 25, Aix-en-Provence	Kalao			1st Voted Out; Day 5
Karine Iraundegui; 50, Tarnos	Lahoy			2nd Voted Out; Day 8
Lionel Dubouchet; 42, Megève	Lahoy			3rd Voted Out; Day 11
Nora Toubal; 51, Villennes-sur-Seine	Kalao			4th Voted Out; Day 14
Jonathan Guez; 36, Paris	Kalao	Lahoy		5th Voted Out; 1st Jury Member; Day 18
Ulrich Bandeira; 43, Rosny-sous-Bois	Kalao	Kalao	Koh-Lanta	6th Voted Out; 2nd Jury Member; Day 19
Johan Pinaud; 36, Istres	Lahoy	Lahoy	Koh-Lanta	7th Voted Out; 3rd Jury Member; Day 21
Paul Estival; 36, Seynod	Kalao	Kalao	Koh-Lanta	Lost Challenge; 4th Jury Member; Day 23
Guillaume Le Deun; Returned to Game	Kalao	Kalao	Koh-Lanta	8th Voted Out; Day 25
Jade Correa; 33, Lutry, Switzerland	Kalao	Kalao	Koh-Lanta	Lost Challenge; 5th Jury Member; Day 29
Lola Krast; 21, Sarreguemines	Kalao	Kalao	Koh-Lanta	Lost Challenge; 6th Jury Member; Day 29
Cindy Sulpice-Gonzalez; 32, Saint-Brice-sous-Forêt	Lahoy	Lahoy	Koh-Lanta	Lost Challenge; 7th Jury Member; Day 31
Antonin Fortunato; 27, Saint-Romain-la-Virvée	Lahoy	Lahoy	Koh-Lanta	9th Voted Out; 8th Jury Member; Day 34
Zakariya Bougoudouima; 29, Cannes	Lahoy	Lahoy	Koh-Lanta	Lost Challenge; 9th Jury Member; Day 36
Daniel Duquesnoy; 51, Ayguemorte-les-Graves	Lahoy	Lahoy	Koh-Lanta	Lost Challenge; 10th Jury Member; Day 37
Hugo Van Aertryck; 25, Nîmes	Kalao	Kalao	Koh-Lanta	Lost Challenge; 11th Jury Member; Day 38
Caroline Ledos; 37, Bègles	Lahoy	Lahoy	Koh-Lanta	Lost Challenge; 12th Jury Member; Day 38
Guillaume Le Deun; 28, Vannes	Kalao	Kalao	Koh-Lanta	10th Voted Out; 13th Jury Member; Day 39
Clarisse Cresseveur; 22, Thonon-les-Bains	Lahoy	Lahoy	Koh-Lanta	Runner-up; Day 39
Cynthia Combes; 37, Damiatte	Kalao	Kalao	Koh-Lanta	Sole Survivor; Day 39

=== Lair of Destiny ===
Episode	Candidate victim of the votes	Poterry	Consequences
1	Lionel	Counterattack duel	Lionel decides to challenge Françoise, who loses the challenge and is thus eliminated. He leaves with an immunity necklace to be used at the next tribal council of the red team.
2	Clémence	Empty	Clémence is definitely eliminated.
3	Karine	Immunity Necklace	Karine, definitively eliminated, must pass the necklace to one of her teammates still in the running. She chooses Cindy.
4	Lionel	Empty	Lionel is definitely eliminated.
5	Nora	Empty	Nora is definitely eliminated.
6	Jonathan	Team transfer	Jonathan ultimately remains in the game but moves to the red team.
8	Ulrich	Immunity Necklace	Ulrich, definitively eliminated, must pass the necklace to one of his remaining teammates. He chooses Jade.
9	Johan	Empty	Johan is definitely eliminated.
10	Guillaume	Empty	Guillaume is definitely eliminated.
11	Lola et Jade	Four-way showdown	Lola and Jade face the last eliminated contestant, Guillaume, and a remaining contestant they must choose, Zakariya. Guillaume wins the challenge and rejoins the game with an immunity necklace, while Zakariya, who finishes second, remains in the game. Lola and Jade are permanently eliminated.
12	Hugo	Counterattack duel	Hugo decides to challenge Cindy, who loses the challenge and is therefore eliminated. He leaves with an immunity necklace which he will use at the next unified tribal council.
13	Antonin	Deprivation of the vote	Antonin deprives one candidate of a vote at the next council meeting. He chooses Guillaume.
14	Guillaume	Counterattack duel	Guillaume discovered the hidden pottery, whose existence was known only to Clarisse, the winner of the first duel. This pottery contained the duel's rebuttal. Guillaume decided to challenge Daniel, who lost the challenge and was thus eliminated.

== Challenges ==
Episode	Air date	Challenges		Eliminated	Vote	Finish
Episode	Air date	Reward	Immunity	Eliminated	Vote	Finish
Episode 1	3 March 2026	Clarisse	Kalao	Françoise (Note: Lionel got eliminated. His relic gave him the opportunity to challenge a contestant. He chose Françoise.)	~~9-1~~	Lost Challenge; Day 3
Episode 2	10 March 2026	Lahoy	Lahoy	Clémence	7-2-1	1st Voted Out; Day 5
Episode 3	17 March 2026	Kalao	Kalao	Karine	3-1-1-1-0	2nd Voted Out; Day 8
Episode 4	24 March 2026	Kalao	Kalao	Lionel	6-1-0	3rd Voted Out; Day 11
Episode 5	31 March 2026	Lahoy	Lahoy	Nora	6-3	4th Voted Out; Day 14
Episode 6	7 April 2026	Kalao	Lahoy	~~Jonathan~~	~~7-1~~	Jonathan ultimately remains in the game but moves to the red team. Day 16
Episode 7	14 April 2026	Kalao		Jonathan		Eliminated; 1st jury member Day 18
Episode 8	21 April 2026		Daniel	Ulrich	7-7; 7-7	5th Voted Out; 2nd jury member Day 19
Episode 9	28 April 2026	Daniel [Clarisse et Antonin]	Daniel & Lola	Johan	6-~~7~~	6th Voted Out; 3rd jury member Day 22
Episode 10	5 May 2026	Zakariya	Cynthia	Paul	0	7th Voted Out; 4th jury member Day 25
Episode 10	5 May 2026	Zakariya	Cynthia	Guillaume	~~6-5~~	8th Voted Out- Day 25
Episode 11	12 May 2026	Jade & Lola	Antonin & Clarisse	Jade & Lola (Note: Their relic allowed them to challenge both the previous eliminated (Guillaume) and another contestant (Zakariya). They ultimately lost and got eliminated. Therefore, Guillaume came back in the game.)	8-2	Lost Challenge; 5th & 6th jury member Day 29
Episode 12	19 May 2026	Hugo & Cynthia	Antonin	Hugo (Note: His relic contained a message allowing him to challenge a contestant. He chose Cindy.)	~~6-3~~	8th Voted Out; Day 31 -
Episode 13	26 May 2026	Guillaume [Hugo]	Guillaume	Cindy		Lost Challenge; 8th jury member Day 31
Episode 13	26 May 2026	Guillaume [Hugo]	Guillaume	Antonin	3-3-1-1	9th Voted Out; 9th jury member Day 34
Episode 14	2 June 2026	Cynthia, Guillaume & Hugo	Cynthia	Zakariya		Lost challenge 10th jury member Day 36
Episode 14	2 June 2026	Cynthia, Guillaume & Hugo	Cynthia	Daniel (Note: Back in the first episode, Clarisse was given a clue indicating her that a secret relic was hidden near the normal relics. She eventually told Guillaume to smash this relic, hoping he could stay in the game. He got voted out, smashed this secret relic and challenged Daniel.)	~~3-2~~	Lost challenge 11th jury challenge Day 37
		Orienteering Challenge	Poles Challenge	Final Council		
Episode 15 (Note: Orienteering Challenge)	9 June 2026	Clarisse, Cynthia & Guillaume	Cynthia	Cynthia	10-3	Winner
Episode 16	23 June 2026	Clarisse, Cynthia & Guillaume	Cynthia	Cynthia	10-3	Winner

== Voting history ==
#	Original Tribe								Merged Tribe																					
Episode	1		2	3	4	5	6	7	8			9	10		11		12				13		14		15			16	Finalist	Winner
Eliminated	Françoise		Clémence	Karine	Lionel	Nora	Jonathan	Jonathan	Ulrich			Johan	Paul	Guillaume	Lola	Jade	Lola	Jade	Hugo		Cindy	Antonin	Zakariya	Guillaume	Daniel	Hugo	Caroline	Guillaume	Clarisse	Cynthia
Votes	~~9-1~~ (Note: Lionel was voted off, but could challenge another contestant to stay in the competition after smashing a relic. He chose to challenge Françoise and won, thus eliminating her.)	Challenge	7-2-1	3-1-1-1-0 (Note: Lionel played a hidden immunity idol on himself, therefore 3 votes against him did not count.)	6-1-0 (Note: Cindy played a hidden immunity idol on herself, therefore 1 vote against her did not count.)	6-3	7-8	4	~~7-7~~	7-7 (Note: As Ulrich and Antonin tied, a new vote immediately occurred.)	Rock Draw (Note: After two rounds of voting, the tribe could not decide between eliminating Ulrich and Antonin.Both picked rocks and Ulrich drew the black rock, resulting in his elimination.)	6-0 (Note: During this tribal council, Jade gave her immunity idol to Hugo. The 7 votes against him were thus nullified, and Johan was ultimately eliminated with 6 votes against him.)	0 (Note: For the immunity challenge, the candidate finishing last (namely Paul) is eliminated immediately.)	6-5	~~8-2~~ (Note: Jade is eliminated, following the elimination of Lola, her partner at the council..)	0 (Note: Jade is eliminated, following the elimination of Lola, her partner at the council..)	Challenge (Note: Lola loses the retaliation duel against Guillaume and Zakariya. Consequently, she is eliminated directly.) (Note: Jade loses the retaliation duel against Guillaume and Zakariya. Consequently, she is eliminated directly.)		3-3-0 (Note: Cynthia used her immunity necklace, canceling three votes against her.)	6-3 (Note: Following a tie during the council meeting, a second vote is held between Caroline and Hugo.)	Challenge (Note: Cindy loses the rematch duel against Hugo. Consequently, she is eliminated.)	3-1-0-0 (Note: Cynthia and Hugo play their immunity necklaces, canceling the votes against them.)	Challenge (Note: For the immunity challenge, the candidate finishing last (name Zakariya) is eliminated immediately.)	3-2	0	Challenge (Note: The final five took part in the Orienteering Race. The first three to finish would make up the final three, with the remaining two people being eliminated.)		1	3-13	10-13
Cynthia			Jonathan			Jonathan	Jonathan		~~Antonin~~	Antonin		Johan		Caroline	~~Lola~~				~~Caroline~~	Caroline		Antonin		Daniel		Won		Guillaume	Jury final	
Clarisse	~~Lionel~~			~~Lionel~~	Lionel				~~Ulrich~~	Ulrich		~~Hugo~~		Guillaume	~~Lola~~				~~Cynthia~~	Hugo		~~Cynthia~~		Guillaume		Won			Jury final	
Guillaume			Clémence			Nora	Jonathan		~~Ulrich~~	Antonin		Johan		Caroline			Won		~~Caroline~~	Caroline		Antonin		(Note: At the previous council meeting, Antonin chose Guillaume to prevent him from voting. Consequently, Guillaume did not vote at this meeting.)	Won	Won				Cynthia
Caroline	~~Lionel~~			~~Lionel~~	Lionel				~~Ulrich~~	Ulrich		~~Hugo~~		Guillaume	~~Lola~~				~~Cynthia~~	Hugo		~~Cynthia~~		Guillaume		Lost			Clarisse	
Hugo			Nora			Nora	Jonathan		~~Antonin~~	Antonin		Johan		Caroline	~~Lola~~				~~Caroline~~	Caroline	Won	Antonin		Daniel		Lost				Cynthia
Daniel	~~Lionel~~			Karine	Lionel				~~Ulrich~~	Ulrich		~~Hugo~~		Guillaume	~~Lola~~				~~Hugo~~	Hugo		~~Hugo~~		Guillaume	Lost					Cynthia
Zakariya	~~Lionel~~			~~Lionel~~	Lionel			Jonathan	~~Ulrich~~	Ulrich		~~Hugo~~		Guillaume	~~Lola~~		Won		~~Hugo~~	Hugo		Daniel	Lost						Clarisse	
Antonin	~~Lionel~~			Karine	~~Cindy~~				~~Ulrich~~	Ulrich	Won	~~Hugo~~		Guillaume	~~Lola~~				~~Hugo~~	Hugo		~~Cynthia~~								Cynthia
Cindy	~~Lionel~~			Clarisse	Lionel				~~Ulrich~~	Ulrich		~~Hugo~~		Guillaume	~~Lola~~				~~Cynthia~~	Hugo	Lost								Clarisse	
Jade			Clémence			Jonathan	Jonathan	Jonathan	~~Antonin~~	Antonin		Johan		Caroline	~~Zakariya~~		Lost													Cynthia
Lola			Clémence			Nora	Jonathan		~~Antonin~~	Antonin		Johan		Caroline	~~Zakariya~~		Lost													Cynthia
Paul			Clémence			Nora	Jonathan		~~Antonin~~	Antonin		Johan	Lost																	Cynthia
Johan	~~Lionel~~			Karine	Lionel			Jonathan	~~Ulrich~~	Ulrich		~~Hugo~~																		Cynthia
Ulrich			Clémence			Nora	Jonathan	Jonathan	~~Antonin~~	Antonin	Lost																			Cynthia
Jonathan			Clémence			Nora	Cynthia																							Cynthia
Nora			Clémence			Jonathan																								
Lionel	~~Françoise~~	Won		Cindy	Clarisse																									
Karine	~~Lionel~~			Zakariya																										
Clémence			Jonathan																											
Françoise	~~Lionel~~	Lost																												
