= Koh-Lanta: Le Feu Sacré =

- Season 24
- Presented by: Denis Brogniart
- No. of days: 40
- No. of castaways: 20
- Winner: Frédéric Khouvilay
- Runner-up: Tania Čakarević
- Location: Caramoan, Philippines
- No. of episodes: 17

Release
- Original network: TF1
- Original release: 21 February – 13 June 2023

Additional information
- Filming dates: 9 August – 17 September 2022

Season chronology
- ← Previous; Le Totem Maudit Next → Les Chasseurs d'Immunité

Koh-Lanta: Le Feu Sacré (transl. "Koh-Lanta: The Sacred Fire") is the twenty-fourth regular season of the French reality television series Koh-Lanta. This season consists of 20 contestants surviving in Caramoan in the Philippines where they'll survive for 40 days and each other to win the grand prize of €100,000. The season premiered on 21 February 2023 on TF1.

== Contestants ==
List of Koh-Lanta: Le Feu Sacré contestants
Contestant	Age	Residence	Tribe					Main game (Note: Elimination order is based on when the contestant was voted out at Tribal Council.)		Duels of the Sacred Fire	
Contestant	Age	Residence	Original	First switch	Second switch	Third switch	Merged	Finish	Day	Finish	Day
Célia Litzellmann	49	Saint-Martin-des-Entrées	Paniman					1st voted out	Day 3		
Emin Luka	56	Brussels, Belgium	Tinago					2nd voted out	Day 6		
Alexandre Delaunay	34	Darnétal	Tinago					3rd voted out	Day 9		
Élodie Migeal	35	Ittre, Belgium	Tinago					Eliminated	Day 10		
Tania Cakarevic (Returned to game)			Paniman	Tinago				4th voted out	Day 12		
Benjamin Di Benedetto	23	Marseille	Paniman	Paniman				Quit	Day 14		
Rudy Noël (Returned to game)			Tinago	Tinago	Tinago			5th voted out	Day 15		
Martin Burrus	30	Collonge-Bellerive, Switzerland	Tinago	Paniman	Paniman			Evacuated	Day 18		
Christine Mayonnade	49	Saint-Pierre-de-Mons	Tinago	Paniman	Paniman			6th voted out	Day 18		
Rudy Noël	41	Vitry-sur-Seine	Tinago	Tinago	Tinago	Paniman		7th voted out	Day 21		
Quentin Paygnard (Returned to game)			Paniman	Tinago	Tinago	Tinago		Eliminated	Day 23		
Grâce Jeantel	39	Montréal-la-Cluse	Paniman	Paniman	Paniman	Paniman	Koh-Lanta	Quit	Day 23		
Anne-Sophie Antoine	34	Lunéville	Tinago	Tinago	Tinago	Tinago	Koh-Lanta	8th voted out 1st jury member	Day 24		
Helena Roosen	27	Braine-l'Alleud, Belgium	Tinago	Tinago	Tinago	Tinago	Koh-Lanta	9th voted out 2nd jury member	Day 26		
Gilles De Baere	31	Willems	Paniman	Paniman	Paniman	Paniman	Koh-Lanta	10th voted out 3rd jury member	Day 29		
Clémence Noquet	27	Saint-Porchaire	Paniman	Tinago	Tinago	Tinago	Koh-Lanta	Eliminated	Day 32	Lost duel 1; 4th jury member	Day 32
Esteban Garcia-Mora	40	Chartres	Tinago	Tinago	Tinago	Tinago	Koh-Lanta	11th voted out	Day 32	Lost duel 2; 5th jury member	Day 34
Tania Cakarevic (Returned to game)			Paniman	Tinago	Paniman	Paniman	Koh-Lanta	12th voted out	Day 33	Returnee	Day 34
Laura Payelle	32	Saintes	Paniman	Paniman	Paniman	Paniman	Koh-Lanta	13th voted out 6th jury member	Day 35		
Quentin Paygnard	26	Philippsbourg	Paniman	Tinago	Tinago	Tinago	Koh-Lanta	14th voted out 7th jury member	Day 38		
Julie Debever	33	Fleury-Mérogis	Tinago	Paniman	Paniman	Paniman	Koh-Lanta	Eliminated; 8th jury member	Day 39		
Nicolas Pretot	43	Grosseto-Prugna	Paniman	Paniman	Paniman	Paniman	Koh-Lanta	15th voted out 9th jury member	Day 40		
Tania Čakarević	22	Bondy	Paniman	Tinago	Paniman	Paniman	Koh-Lanta	Runner-up	Day 40		
Frédéric Khouvilay	33	Le Plessis-Robinson	Paniman	Tinago	Tinago	Tinago	Koh-Lanta	Sole Survivor	Day 40		

== Future appearances ==
Frédéric Khouvilay returned for Koh-Lanta: La Tribu Maudite. Nicolas Pretot and Tania Čakarević returned for Koh-Lanta: All Stars.

== Season summary ==
Koh-Lanta: Le Feu Sacré season summary
Episode		Sacred Fire duels		Challenge winner(s)		Eliminated	
No.	Air date	Winner	Eliminated	Reward	Immunity	Tribe	Player
1	February 21, 2023	None		Nicolas	Tinago	Paniman	Célia
2	February 28, 2023	None		Tinago	Paniman	Tinago	Emin
3	March 7, 2023	None		Paniman	Paniman	Tinago	Alexandre
4	March 14, 2023	None		Gilles [Rudy]	Paniman	None	Élodie
4	March 14, 2023	None		Gilles [Rudy]	Paniman	Tinago	Tania
5	March 21, 2023	None		Tinago	Paniman	Paniman	Benjamin
5	March 21, 2023	None		Tinago	Paniman	Tinago	Rudy
6	March 28, 2023	None		Paniman	Tinago	Paniman	Martin
6	March 28, 2023	None		Gilles	Tinago	Paniman	Christine
7	April 4, 2023	None		Paniman	Tinago	Paniman	Rudy
8	April 11, 2023	None		Tinago	None	Tinago	Quentin
9	April 18, 2023	None		None	Clémence	Koh-Lanta	Grâce
9	April 18, 2023	None		None	Clémence	Koh-Lanta	Anne-Sophie
10	April 25, 2023	None		Quentin [Frédéric]	Clémence	Koh-Lanta	Helena
11	May 2, 2023	None		Gilles [Nicolas]	Nicolas	Koh-Lanta	Gilles
12	May 9, 2023	None		Laura, Quentin	Fréderic, Tania	Koh-Lanta	Esteban
12	May 9, 2023	None		Laura, Quentin	Fréderic, Tania	Koh-Lanta	Clémence
13	May 16, 2023	Esteban	Clémence	Laura		Koh-Lanta	Tania
13	May 16, 2023	Tania	Esteban	None			
14	May 23, 2023			None	Nicolas	Koh-Lanta	Laura
15	May 30, 2023			Quentin [Frédéric]	Frédéric	Koh-Lanta	Quentin
16	June 6, 2023			None	Nicolas	Koh-Lanta	Julie
16	June 6, 2023			None	Tania	Koh-Lanta	Julie
16	June 6, 2023			None	Frédéric	Koh-Lanta	Julie
17	June 13, 2023			None	Frédéric	Koh-Lanta	Nicolas

== Voting history ==
Koh-Lanta: Le Feu Sacré voting history
	Original tribe				No tribe	First switch			Second switch			Third switch			Merged tribe																	
Episode	1	2		3	4			5		6		7		8	9		10		11		12			13			14		15		16	17
Day	3	6		9	10	12		14	15	18		21		23		24	26		29		32				33	34	35		38		39	40
Tribe	Paniman	Tinago		Tinago	None	Tinago		Paniman	Tinago	Paniman	Paniman	Paniman		Tinago	Koh-Lanta	Koh-Lanta	Koh-Lanta		Koh-Lanta		Koh-Lanta			None	Koh-Lanta	None	Koh-Lanta		Koh-Lanta		Koh-Lanta	Koh-Lanta
Eliminated	Célia	Emin		Alexandre	Élodie	Tania		Benjamin	Rudy	Martin	Christine	Rudy		Quentin	Grace	Anne-Sophie	Helena		Gilles		Esteban		Clémence	Clémence	Tania	Esteban	Laura		Quentin		Julie	Nicolas
Votes	6-3-1	9-2		4-3-2	Challenge	5-2-0 (Note: The person given immunity by the Sacred Fire Talisman received votes, and these were nullified.)		Quit	5-1-1	Evacuated	5-2	3-0 (Note: The person given immunity by the Sacred Fire Talisman received votes, and these were nullified.)		Rock draw (Note: The Tribal Ambassadors selected one contestant between them to be eliminated prior to the merge. Should they fail to reach a consensus, they would draw rocks to decide which of the two of them would be eliminated. Quentin chose the black rock after they could not come to a consensus.)	Quit	6-3-3	7-4		6-3-2-1		6-4		None (Note: Tied destiny.)	Duel	5-1-0 (Note: The person given immunity by the Sacred Fire Talisman received votes, and these were nullified.)	Duel	4-3-1		2-0 (Note: An Immunity Talisman was played, and five votes for Tania were nullified.)		Challenge	1-0
Voter	Vote				Challenge	Vote								Lottery	Vote									Duel	Vote	Duel	Vote				Challenge	Vote
Frédéric	Tania				Safe	Tania			Rudy							Tania	Tania		Tania		Esteban				Tania		Laura		~~Tania~~		Won	Nicolas
Tania	Célia				Safe	~~Quentin~~					Christine	Rudy				Anne-Sophie	Helena		Gilles		Esteban				~~Quentin~~	Won	Laura		Quentin		Won	None
Nicolas	Célia				Safe						Christine	Rudy				Anne-Sophie	Helena		Esteban		Esteban	Esteban (Note: Upon his exit, Gilles willed an extra vote for the fourth post-merge Tribal Council to Nicolas.)			Tania		Laura		~~Tania~~		Won	None
Julie		Emin		Élodie	Safe						Tania	~~Tania~~				Anne-Sophie	Helena	Helena (Note: Upon her exit, Anne-Sophie willed an extra vote for the second post-merge Tribal Council to Julie.)	Gilles		Esteban	Esteban (Note: Julie played a hidden advantage that allowed her to cast two votes at Tribal Council.)			Tania		Laura		Quentin		Lost	
Quentin	Célia				Safe	Tania			Rudy					Black rock		Tania	Tania		Tania		Nicolas				Julie		Tania	Tania (Note: Upon his exit, Esteban willed an extra vote for the sixth post-merge Tribal Council to Quentin.)	~~Tania~~	~~Tania~~ (Note: Upon her exit, Laura willed an extra vote for the seventh post-merge Tribal Council to Quentin.)		
Laura	Tania				Safe						Christine	~~Tania~~				Anne-Sophie	Helena		Gilles		Nicolas				Tania		Tania					
Esteban		Emin		Alexandre	Safe	Tania			Frédéric							Anne-Sophie	Helena		Gilles		Nicolas			Won		Lost						
Clémence	Tania				Safe	None (Note: Rudy played a hidden advantage that allowed him to cast steal a vote at tribal council. He stole Clémence's vote.)			Rudy							Anne-Sophie	Tania		Gilles	Gilles (Note: Upon her exit, Helena willed an extra vote for the third post-merge Tribal Council to Clémence.)	Nicolas			Lost								
Gilles	Célia				Won						Christine	Rudy				Anne-Sophie	Helena		Esteban													
Helena		Emin		Alexandre	Safe	Tania			Rudy							Julie	Tania															
Anne-Sophie		Emin		Alexandre	Safe	Tania			Rudy							Tania																
Grace	Célia				Safe						Christine	None		White rock																		
Rudy		Emin		Alexandre	Safe	Clémence	Clémence (Note: Rudy played a hidden advantage that allowed him to cast steal a vote at tribal council. He stole Clémence's vote.)		Anne-Sophie			~~Tania~~	~~Tania~~ (Note: Rudy played a hidden advantage that allowed him to cast steal a vote at Tribal Council. He stole Grâce's vote.)																			
Christine		Emin		Élodie	Safe						Tania																					
Martin		Emin		Élodie	Safe																											
Benjamin	Celia				Safe																											
Élodie		Emin		Rudy	Lost																											
Alexandre		Emin		Rudy																												
Emin		Christine	Christine (Note: Emin played a hidden advantage that allowed him to cast two votes at Tribal Council.)																													
Célia	Clémence																															
Penalty																Julie			Esteban	Laura					Tania		Quentin		~~Tania~~			

Jury vote
Episode	17	
Day	40	
Finalist	Fréderic	Tania
Vote	7-2	
Juror	Vote	
Nicolas	Yes	
Julie		Yes
Quentin	Yes	
Laura	Yes	
Esteban		Yes
Clémence	Yes	
Gilles	Yes	
Helena	Yes	
Anne-Sophie	Yes	
