= Koh-Lanta: Les 4 Terres =

- Season 21
- Presented by: Denis Brogniart
- No. of days: 40
- No. of castaways: 24
- Winner: Alexandra Pornet
- Runner-up: Brice Petit
- Location: Kadavu Group, Fiji

Release
- Original network: TF1
- Original release: 28 August – 4 December 2020

Season chronology
- ← Previous; L'île des héros Next → Les Armes Secrètes

Koh-Lanta: Les 4 Terres (transl. "Koh-Lanta: The Four Lands") is the twenty-first regular season and the twenty-fifth season overall of the French reality television series Koh-Lanta. For the first time in the show's history, four tribes representing a region of France will compete against each other (North = Vualiku, East = Tokalo, South = Ceva, West = Vakara), in challenges to win rewards as well as immunity to avoid being sent to tribal council and vote off one of their own. A big twist this season is for the first time, none of the starting tribes have the traditional colours of Koh-Lanta; red and yellow. In addition, 24 contestants compete for 40 days to win €100,000 and win the title of Sole Survivor. The season premiered on 28 August 2020. In the end, Alexandra Pornet won against Brice Petit in a jury vote of 7-5 to win the title of Sole Survivor. After the death of Bertrand-Kamal, a donation site was created to pay tribute to him.

== Contestants ==
Contestant	Original Tribe	Episode 2 Tribe	Episode 4 Tribe	Swapped Tribe	Merged Tribe	Finish
Marie-France Schieber; Returned to Game	Vualiku					1st Voted Out; Day 3
François Zabalo; 47, Biarritz	Vakara					Medically evacuated Day 5
Carole Collado; 52, Marseille	Ceva	Ceva				2nd Voted Out; Day 5
Diane Goulesque; Returned to Game	Vakara	Vakara				3rd Voted Out; Day 8
Samuel Degoute; 39, Suresnes	Vualiku	Vualiku				Medically evacuated Day 9
Diane Goulesque; 25, Pau	Vakara	Vakara	Vualiku			4th Voted Out; Day 10
Estelle Fabrice; 47, Yerville	Vakara	Vakara	Vakara			5th Voted Out; Day 11
Mathieu Blanchard; 31, Cavaillon/Montreal, Canada	Ceva	Ceva	Ceva			6th Voted Out; Day 11
Adrien Ferreira; 30, Paris	Vualiku	Vualiku	Vualiku	Sayake		7th Voted Out; Day 14
Aubin Bligny; 23, Mauvezin	Ceva	Ceva	Ceva	Vuro		8th Voted Out; Day 16
Sébastien Aberlenc; 37, Bourg-Saint-Andéol	Ceva	Ceva	Ceva	Sayake		9th Voted Out; Day 19
Marie-France Schieber; 49, Sainte-Ode, Belgium	Vualiku	Vakara	Vakara	Sayake		10th Voted Out; Evacuated from Jury; Day 22 (Note: Marie-France had to go back to Belgium for personal reasons. As a result, she did not vote at the final tribal council)
Hadja Cissé; 28, Épernay	Tokalo	Tokalo	Tokalo	Sayake	Koh-Lanta	11th Voted Out; 1st Jury Member; Day 23
Bertrand-Kamal Loudrhiri †; 30, Dijon	Tokalo	Tokalo	Tokalo	Sayake	Koh-Lanta	Lost Challenge; 2nd Jury Member; Day 25
Joaquina Pereira Nunes; 38, Anse	Tokalo	Tokalo	Tokalo	Sayake	Koh-Lanta	12th Voted Out; 3rd Jury Member; Day 26
Jody Favier; 32, La Tremblade	Vakara	Vakara	Vakara	Vuro	Koh-Lanta	13th Voted Out; 4th Jury Member; Day 29
Laurent Affri; 48, Saint-Marcellin	Tokalo	Tokalo	Tokalo	Vuro	Koh-Lanta	14th Voted Out; 5th Jury Member; Day 32
Alix Noblat; 28, Aubagne	Ceva	Ceva	Ceva	Vuro	Koh-Lanta	15th Voted Out; 6th Jury Member; Day 32
Fabrice Pietrzak; 54, Maubeuge	Vualiku	Vualiku	Vualiku	Sayake	Koh-Lanta	Lost Challenge; 7th Jury Member; Day 35
Ava Maisani Casanova; 26, Ajaccio/Paris	Ceva	Ceva	Ceva	Sayake	Koh-Lanta	16th Voted Out; 8th Jury Member; Day 35
Angélique Ti; 26, Montrouge	Vualiku	Vualiku	Vualiku	Vuro	Koh-Lanta	17th Voted Out; 9th Jury Member; Day 38
Dorian Louvet; 30, Caen	Vakara	Vakara	Vakara	Vuro	Koh-Lanta	Lost Challenge; 10th Jury Member; Day 39
Lola Labesse; 23, Berck	Vualiku	Vualiku	Vualiku	Vuro	Koh-Lanta	Lost Challenge; 11th Jury Member; Day 39
Loïc Riowal; 20, Les Échelles	Tokalo	Tokalo	Tokalo	Vuro	Koh-Lanta	18th Voted Out; 12th Jury Member; Day 40
Brice Petit; 22, La Souterraine/Paris	Vakara	Vakara	Vakara	Sayake	Koh-Lanta	Runner-up; Day 40
Alexandra Pornet; 32, Ferney-Voltaire	Tokalo	Tokalo	Tokalo	Vuro	Koh-Lanta	Sole Survivor; Day 40

== Future appearances ==
Alix Noblat, Loïc Riowal & Alexandra Pornet returned to compete in Koh-Lanta: La Légende. Dorian Louvet and Lola Labesse returned for Koh-Lanta: All Stars.

== Challenges ==
Episode	Air date	Challenges		Eliminated	Vote	Finish
Episode	Air date	Reward	Immunity	Eliminated	Vote	Finish
Episode 1	28 August 2020	Vakara	Tokalo	Marie-France	5-1	1st voted out Day 3
Episode 1	28 August 2020	Ceva	Ceva	Marie-France	5-1	1st voted out Day 3
Episode 1	28 August 2020	Vualiku	Vakara	Marie-France	5-1	1st voted out Day 3
Episode 2	4 September 2020	Ceva	Tokalo	François	0	Medically evacuated Day 5
Episode 2	4 September 2020	Vakara	Vakara	Carole	5-1	2nd Voted Out; Day 5
Episode 2	4 September 2020	Vualiku	Vualiku	Carole	5-1	2nd Voted Out; Day 5
Episode 3	11 September 2020	Tokalo	Tokalo	Diane	1-0 (Note: Estelle played a hidden immunity idol on herself. As a result, five votes against her did not count.)	3rd Voted Out; Day 8
Episode 3	11 September 2020	Ceva	Vualiku	Diane	1-0	3rd Voted Out; Day 8
Episode 3	11 September 2020	Vakara	Ceva	Diane	1-0	3rd Voted Out; Day 8
Episode 4	18 September 2020	Tokalo	Tokalo	Samuel	0	Medically evacuated Day 9
Episode 4	18 September 2020	Vakara	Tokalo	Diane	4-1	4th Voted Out; Day 10
Episode 4	18 September 2020	Vualiku	Tokalo	Estelle	3-2	5th Voted Out; Day 11
Episode 4	18 September 2020	Vualiku	Tokalo	Mathieu	1-0 (Note: Aubin played a hidden immunity idol on himself. As a result, four votes against him did not count.)	6th Voted Out; Day 11
Episode 5	25 September 2020	Alix	Vuro	Adrien	7-2	7th Voted Out; Day 14
Episode 5	25 September 2020	Bertrand-Kamal	Vuro	Adrien	7-2	7th Voted Out; Day 14
Episode 6	2 October 2020	Vuro	Sayake	Aubin	6-4 (Note: Aubin received a penalty vote after finishing last at the reward challenge.)	8th Voted Out; Day 16
Episode 7	9 October 2020	Sayake	Vuro	Sébastien	5-3	9th Voted Out; Day 19
Episode 8	16 October 2020	Vuro	Alix	Marie-France	2	10th Voted Out; Evacuated from Jury; Day 22
Episode 8	16 October 2020	Vuro	Alix	Hadja	7-5-1-0 (Note: Alix played her hidden immunity idol on Dorian. As a result, one vote against him didn't count.)	11th Voted Out; 1st Jury Member; Day 23
Episode 9	23 October 2020	Alexandra, Brice & Lola	Angélique	Bertrand-Kamal	0 (Note: Bertrand-Kamal finished last in the immunity challenge. As a result, he was eliminated from the game.)	Lost Challenge; 2nd Jury Member; Day 25
Episode 9	23 October 2020	Alexandra, Brice & Lola	Angélique	Joaquina	7-5-1	12th Voted Out; 3rd Jury Member; Day 26
Episode 10	30 October 2020	Lola [Angélique]	Lola	Jody	4-2-1-0 (Note: Lola played a hidden immunity idol for Angélique at tribal council. As a result, six votes against her did not count.)	13th Voted Out; 4th Jury Member; Day 29
Episode 11	6 November 2020	Fabrice & Lola	Alexandra & Loïc	Laurent & Alix	6-3-2	14th Voted Out; 5th Jury Member; 15th Voted Out; 6th Jury Member; Day 32
Episode 12	13 November 2020	Dorian, Alexandra, Loïc & Lola	Brice	Fabrice	0 (Note: Fabrice finished last in the immunity challenge. As a result, he was eliminated from the game.)	Lost Challenge; 7th Jury Member; Day 35
Episode 12	13 November 2020	Dorian, Alexandra, Loïc & Lola	Brice	Ava	6-1-1	16th Voted Out; 8th Jury Member; Day 35
Episode 13	20 November 2020	Angélique [Lola]	Loïc	Angélique	4-3	17th Voted Out; 9th Jury Member; Day 38
Episode 14	27 November 2020	Alexandra, Brice & Loïc		Dorian	0	Lost Challenge; 10th Jury Member; Day 39
Episode 14	27 November 2020	Alexandra, Brice & Loïc		Lola	0	Lost Challenge; 11th Jury Member; Day 39
Episode 15	4 December 2020	Brice		Loïc	1	18th Voted Out; 12th Jury Member; Day 40
Episode 15	4 December 2020			Jury vote		
Episode 15	4 December 2020	Brice	5/12 votes	Runner-up; Day 40		
Episode 15	4 December 2020	Alexandra	7/12 votes	Sole Survivor; Day 40		

== Voting history ==
#	Original Tribe		Episode 2 Tribe			Episode 4 Tribe			Swapped Tribe				Merged Tribe											
Episode	1	2		3	4 (Note: This episode was a triple elimination. The tribe who won immunity would be the only tribe to avoid Tribal Council. Additionally, the tribe who placed last in the immunity challenge (Vualiku), participated in an instant Tribal Council immediately after the challenge.)				5	6	7	8		9		10	11		12		13	14		15
Voted out	Marie-France	François	Carole	Diane	Samuel	Diane	Estelle	Mathieu	Adrien	Aubin	Sébastien	Marie-France	Hadja	Bertrand-Kamal	Joaquina	Jody	Laurent	Alix	Fabrice	Ava	Angélique	Dorian	Lola	Loïc
Votes	5-1	0	5-1	1-0	0	4-1	3-2	1-0	7-2	6-4	5-3	2	7-5-1-0	0	7-5-1	4-2-1-0 (Note: Angélique used a hidden immunity idol given from Lola on herself. As a result, six votes against her did not count.) (Note: Alexandra finished last in the immunity challenge. As a result, she received a penalty vote at tribal council.)	6-3-2	0 (Note: Alix was Laurent's partner during the linked partners segment of the game. As Laurent was eliminated, Alix was too.)	0	6-1-1	4-3	0 (Note: Dorian finished last midway through the orientation challenge. As a result, he was eliminated from the game.)	0 (Note: Lola finished last at the end of the orientation challenge. As a result, she was eliminated from the game.)	1
Alexandra										Jody			Hadja		Joaquina	~~Angélique~~	Laurent			Ava	Brice			
Brice				~~Estelle~~			Estelle		Adrien		Sébastien		Angélique		Alexandra	~~Angélique~~	Laurent			Lola	Angélique			Loïc
Loïc										Aubin		Marie-France	~~Dorian~~		Lola	~~Angélique~~	Brice			Ava	Angélique			
Lola	Marie-France					Diane				Aubin			Hadja		Joaquina	Jody	Brice			Ava	Brice			
Dorian				~~Estelle~~			Estelle			Aubin			Hadja		Joaquina	~~Angélique~~	Fabrice			Ava	Angélique			
Angélique	Marie-France					Diane				Jody			Hadja		Joaquina	Jody	Laurent			Ava	Brice			
Ava			Carole					~~Aubin~~	Adrien		Marie-France		Angélique		Lola	~~Angélique~~	Laurent			Dorian	Angélique			
Fabrice	Marie-France					Diane			Joaquina		Marie-France		Laurent		Joaquina	Jody	Laurent							
Alix			Carole					~~Aubin~~		Jody			Hadja		Joaquina	Jody	Fabrice							
Laurent										Aubin			Hadja		Joaquina	Fabrice	Fabrice			Ava				
Jody				~~Estelle~~			Estelle			Aubin			Hadja		Lola	~~Angélique~~	Laurent							
Joaquina									Adrien		Sébastien		Angélique		Lola	Brice								
Bertrand-Kamal									Adrien		Sébastien		Angélique											
Hadja									Adrien		Sébastien	Marie-France	Angélique		Lola									
Marie-France	Angélique			~~Estelle~~			Jody		Adrien		Sébastien													
Sébastien			Carole					~~Aubin~~	Adrien		Marie-France													
Aubin			Carole					Mathieu		Jody														
Adrien	Marie-France					Diane			Joaquina															
Mathieu			Carole					~~Aubin~~																
Estelle				Diane			Jody																	
Diane				~~Estelle~~		Adrien																		
Samuel	Marie-France																							
Carole			Ava																					
François																								
Penalty Vote										Aubin						Alexandra								

Jury vote
Episode #	15	
Day #	40	
Finalist	Brice	Alexandra
Vote	7-5	
Juror	Vote	
Loïc		Alexandra
Lola		Alexandra
Dorian	Brice	
Angélique		Alexandra
Ava	Brice	
Fabrice	Brice	
Alix		Alexandra
Laurent		Alexandra
Jody		Alexandra
Joaquina	Brice	
Bertrand-Kamal		Alexandra
Hadja	Brice	
