= Malbrans =

- Commune
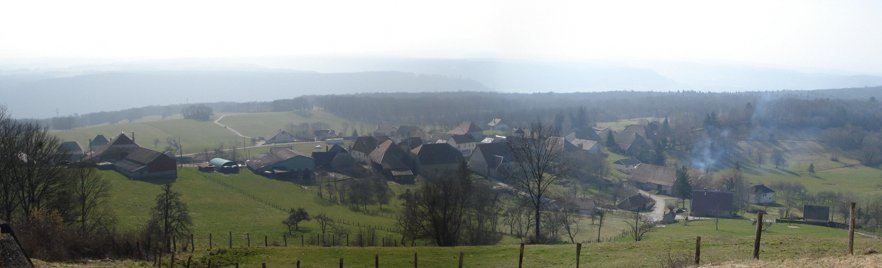
- A general view of Malbrans
- Location of Malbrans
- Location within France Location within Bourgogne-Franche-Comté
- Coordinates: 47°07′15″N 6°04′56″E
- Country: France
- Region: Bourgogne-Franche-Comté
- Department: Doubs
- Arrondissement: Besançon
- Canton: Ornans

Government
  - Mayor (2020–2026): Philippe Bouquet
- Area^{1}: 8.74 km^{2} (3.37 sq mi)
- Highest elevation: 624 m (2,047 ft)
- Lowest elevation: 380 m (1,250 ft)
- Population (2023): 155
  - Density: 17.7/km^{2} (45.9/sq mi)
- Time zone: UTC+01:00 (CET)
  - Summer (DST): UTC+02:00 (CEST)
- INSEE/Postal code: 25360 /25620
- ^{1} French Land Register data, which excludes lakes, ponds, glaciers > 1 km^{2} (0.386 sq mi or 247 acres) and river estuaries.

Malbrans (French pronunciation: [malbʁɑ̃]) is a commune in the Doubs department in the Bourgogne-Franche-Comté region in eastern France.

== Geography ==
Malbran lies 9 km (5.6 mi) northwest of Ornans in the valley of the Loue.

== Population ==
Historical population
Year	Pop.	±% p.a.
1968	120	—
1975	111	−1.11%
1982	115	+0.51%
1990	120	+0.53%
1999	102	−1.79%
2007	123	+2.37%
2012	136	+2.03%
2017	160	+3.30%
2023	155	−0.53%
Source: INSEE

== See also ==
- Communes of the Doubs department
