= Koh-Lanta: Fidji =

- No. of days: 41
- No. of castaways: 21
- Winner: André Deleplace
- Location: Yasawa Islands, Fiji

Release
- Original release: September 1 – December 15, 2017

Season chronology
- ← Previous; Cambodge Next → Le Combat des Héros

Koh-Lanta: Fidji (lit. '"Koh-Lanta: Fiji"') is the 18th season of the French version of Survivor, Koh-Lanta. This season took place in Fiji on the Yasawa Islands, and is aired on TF1. The main twist this season is that the two tribes of 10 are divided into tribes based on their ages. Those 30 and under are members of the Coravu tribe. Those 30 and over are members of the Makawa tribe. The season premiered on September 1, 2017.

== Contestants ==
Contestant	Original Tribe	Episode 2 Tribe	Swapped Tribe	Merged Tribe	Finish
Marine Alves; 21, Moulins	Coravu				Medically evacuated Day 3
Delphine Bruyère; 39, Orléans	Makawa				1st Voted Out; Day 3
Marvyn Leone; Returned to Game	Coravu	Coravu			2nd Voted Out; Day 6
Thomas Hébert; 21, Sainte-Adresse	Coravu	Coravu			Medically evacuated Day 7
Mélanie "Mel" Moresve; 25, Rozay-en-Brie	Coravu	Coravu			3rd Voted Out; Day 9
Théotime Bernardin; 23, Remiremont	Coravu	Coravu			Lost Challenge; Day 10
Marta Anne Molino; 20, Monaco	Coravu	Coravu	Makawa		4th Voted Out; Day 12
May Peitavi; 20, Toulouse		Coravu	Coravu		5th Voted Out; Day 15
Caroline Demartis; 31, Aix-en-Provence	Makawa	Makawa	Coravu		6th Voted Out; Day 18
Manu Delanghe; 57, Comines-Warneton, Belgium	Makawa	Makawa	Coravu		7th Voted Out; Day 21
Tugdual Paul; 27, Planguenoual	Coravu	Coravu	Makawa		8th Voted Out; Day 23
Marvyn Leone; 20, Rennes	Coravu	Coravu	Coravu	Koh-Lanta	9th Voted Out; 1st jury member Day 24
Sébastien Mériaux; 43, Valenciennes	Makawa	Makawa	Makawa	Koh-Lanta	10th Voted Out; 2nd jury member Day 27
Fabian Rocha Rocha; 47, Onnens, Switzerland	Makawa	Makawa	Coravu	Koh-Lanta	11th Voted Out; 3rd jury member Day 30
Maxime Stafrach; 38, Lyon	Makawa	Makawa	Coravu	Koh-Lanta	12th Voted Out; 4th jury member Day 33
André Deleplace; Returned to Game	Coravu	Coravu	Makawa	Koh-Lanta	13th Voted Out; Day 33
Mélanie Moret; 34, Geneva, Switzerland	Makawa	Makawa	Makawa	Koh-Lanta	Medically evacuated 5th jury member Day 36
Romain Delaroche; 31, Tours	Makawa	Makawa	Makawa	Koh-Lanta	14th Voted Out; 6th jury member Day 36
Marguerite Leblanc; 52, Bondues	Makawa	Makawa	Makawa	Koh-Lanta	15th Voted Out; 7th jury member Day 39
Sandrine Dubourdy; 43, Brive-la-Gaillarde	Makawa	Makawa	Makawa	Koh-Lanta	Lost Challenge; 8th jury member Day 40
Magalie Gustave; 29, Bobigny	Coravu	Coravu	Coravu	Koh-Lanta	16th Voted Out; 9th jury member Day 41
Tiffany Gounin; 22, Marseille	Coravu	Coravu	Coravu	Koh-Lanta	Runner-Up; Day 41
André Deleplace; 19, Jargeau	Coravu	Coravu	Makawa	Koh-Lanta	Sole Survivor; Day 41

== Future appearances ==
Tiffany Gounin returned for Koh-Lanta: Le Combat des Héros.

== Challenges ==
Air date	Challenge		Eliminated	Vote	Finish
Air date	Reward	Immunity	Eliminated	Vote	Finish
September 1, 2017	Coravu	Coravu	Marine	0	Medically Evacuated; Day 3
September 1, 2017	Makawa	Coravu	Delphine	6-4	1st Voted Out; Day 3
September 8, 2017	Makawa	Makawa	Marvyn	6-4	2nd Voted Out; Day 6
September 15, 2017	Makawa	Makawa	Thomas	0	Medically Evacuated; Day 7
September 15, 2017	Makawa	Makawa	Mel	6-4	3rd Voted Out; Day 9
September 22, 2017	Coravu	Coravu	Théotime	0	Lost Challenge; Day 10
September 22, 2017	Coravu	Coravu	Marta	5-2-1	4th Voted Out; Day 12
September 29, 2017	Coravu	Makawa	May	7-1	5th Voted Out; Day 15
October 6, 2017	Coravu	Makawa	Caroline	7-1	6th Voted Out; Day 18
October 6, 2017	Coravu	[Manu]	Caroline	7-1	6th Voted Out; Day 18
October 13, 2017	Makawa	Makawa	Manu	3-3	7th Voted Out; Day 21
October 20, 2017	Coravu	Sébastien	Tugdual	0	8th Voted Out; Day 23
October 20, 2017	Coravu	Sébastien	Marvyn	5-5-1/ 6-5	9th Voted Out; 1st Jury Member; Day 24
October 27, 2017	Fabian & Marguerite	André	Sébastien	6-5	10th Voted Out; 2nd Jury Member; Day 27
November 3, 2017	Romain, André, Fabian, Magalie	Mélanie	Fabian	~~6~~-3-1	11th Voted Out; 3rd Jury Member; Day 30
November 17, 2017	Maxime & André	Sandrine & Magalie	Maxime & André	~~5~~-4	12th Voted Out 4th Jury Member; ~~13th Voted Out 5th Jury Member~~ Day 33
November 24, 2017	Romain [Sandrine]	Tiffany	Mélanie	0	Medically Evacuated; 5th Jury Member; Day 36
November 24, 2017	Magalie	Tiffany	Romain	~~3~~-2-1	14th Voted Out; 6th Jury Member; Day 36
December 8, 2017	Magalie (Sandrine)	Tiffany	Marguerite	3-3 / 3-2	15th Voted Out; 7th Jury Member; Day 39
December 15, 2017	None	None	Sandrine	No Vote	Lost Challenge; 8th Jury Member; Day 40
December 15, 2017	None	None	Magalie	1	16th Voted Out; 9th Jury Member; Day 41
December 15, 2017	None	None			Jury vote
December 15, 2017	None	None	Tiffany	1/9 votes	Runner-up
December 15, 2017	None	None	André	8/9 votes	Sole Survivor

== Voting history ==
	Original Tribes						Switched Tribes							Merged Tribes											
► Episode	1		2	3			4		5	6		7	8			9	10	11		12		13		14	
► Eliminated	Marine	Delphine	Marvyn	Thomas	Mel		Théotime	Marta	May	Caroline		Manu	Tugdual	Marvyn		Sébastien	Fabian	Maxime	André	Mélanie	Romain	Marguerite		Sandrine	Magalie
► Votes	0	6-4	6-4	0	6-4		0	5-2-1	7-1	7-1		3-3	2	5-5-1	6-5	6-5	~~6~~-3-1	~~5~~-4	0	0	~~3~~-2-1	3-3	3-2	0	1
▼ Contestants	Votes																								
André			May		Mel		3rd	Tugdual						Romain	Romain	Sébastien	Fabian	~~Marguerite~~				Marguerite	Marguerite		Magalie
Tiffany			Marvyn		May				May	Caroline		Manu		Romain	Romain	Sébastien	Fabian	~~Marguerite~~			Romain	Marguerite	Marguerite		
Magalie			May		Mel				May	Caroline		Manu		Romain	Romain	Sébastien	Fabian	~~Marguerite~~			Romain	Marguerite	Marguerite		
Sandrine		Delphine						Marta						Marvyn	Marvyn	Tiffany	~~Magalie~~	Maxime			~~Magalie~~	André	André		
Marguerite		Delphine						Marta					Tugdual	Marvyn	Marvyn	Tiffany	~~Magalie~~	Maxime			~~Magalie~~	André	André		
Romain		Delphine					4th	Marta						Marvyn	Marvyn	Tiffany	~~Magalie~~	Maxime			~~Magalie~~	André			
Mélanie		Delphine					1st	Marta						Marvyn	Marvyn	Tiffany	~~Magalie~~	Maxime							
Maxime		Marguerite					2nd		May	Caroline		Marvyn		Fabian	Marvyn	Sébastien	André	~~Marguerite~~			Marguerite				
Fabian		Delphine							May	Caroline		Marvyn	Tugdual	Romain	Romain	Sébastien	~~Magalie~~	~~Marguerite~~							
Sébastien		Marguerite						Marta						Marvyn	Marvyn	Tiffany	~~Magalie~~								
Marvyn			May		Mel				May	Caroline		Manu		Romain	Romain	Sébastien									
Tugdual			Marvyn		May			Marguerite																	
Manu		Marguerite							May	Caroline	Caroline	Marvyn													
Caroline		Delphine							May	Tiffany															
May			Marvyn		Mel				Manu																
Marta			Marvyn		May			Marguerite																	
Théotime			May		Mel	Mel	Last																		
Mel			Marvyn		May																				
Thomas			Marvyn																						
Delphine		Marguerite																							
Marine																									

Jury vote
Episode #	14	
Day #	41	
Finalist	Tiffany	André
Vote	8-1	
Juror	Vote	
Magalie	Tiffany	
Sandrine		André
Marguerite		André
Romain		André
Mélanie		André
Maxime		André
Fabian		André
Sébastien		André
Marvyn		André
