= Koh-Lanta: La Guerre des Chefs =

- Presented by: Denis Brogniart
- No. of days: 39
- No. of castaways: 21
- Winner: Maud Bamps
- Runner-up: Cindy Poumeyrol
- Location: Kadavu Group, Fiji

Release
- Original network: TF1 (and TFX replay)
- Original release: 15 March – 21 June 2019

Season chronology
- ← Previous; Le Combat des Héros; Koh-Lanta 19 (Cancelled) Next → L'Île des héros

Koh-Lanta: La Guerre des Chefs (transl. The War of Chiefs) was the 20th season of the French reality game show from the popular television series, Koh-Lanta. The season premiered in France on TF1 on 15 March 2019, and concluded on 21 June 2019. The season was produced by Adventure Line Productions. Filming for the season began soon after the previous season was cancelled due to a sexual allegation.

This season takes place in the Kadavu Group in Fiji. For the first time since Koh-Lanta: Cambodge, there are three tribes. However, this time each tribe has a head chief who were chosen after winning the orientation challenge. This is also the first season to start off with more than 20 contestants.

The season concluded on 21 June 2019 where Maud Bamps won against Cindy Poumeyrol in a close 7–6 vote, becoming the first Belgian to win Koh-Lanta.

== Finishing order ==
| Contestant | Original Tribe | Swapped Tribe | Merged Tribe | Finish |
|---|---|---|---|---|
| Frédéric Blanchard; Returned to game | Ikalu | | | 1st Voted Out; Day 3 |
| Aliséa Lecomte; 20, Rennes | Ikalu | | | Medically evacuated Day 5 |
| Victor Rollinger; Returned to game | Kama | | | 2nd voted out Day 6 |
| Carinne Elka-Dioza; 45, Caen | Tabuo | | | Medically evacuated Day 9 |
| Émilie Tybot; 35, Bordeaux | Kama | Kama | | 3rd voted out Day 9 |
| Victor Rollinger; 25, Strasbourg | Kama | Tabuo | | 4th voted out Day 12 |
| Chloé Chaize; 32, Louer | Kama | Kama | | 5th voted out Day 14 |
| Xavier Vançon; 53, Beauvais | Kama | Kama | | 6th voted out Day 16 |
| Frédéric Blanchard; 52, Noyelles-sous-Lens | Ikalu | Ikalu | | 7th Voted Out; 1st jury member Day 18 |
| Alexandre André; 28, Saint-Ouen-sur-Seine | Kama | Kama | Koh-Lanta | 8th Voted Out; 2nd jury member Day 19 |
| Béatrice Kabore; 28, Saint-Malo | Tabuo | Tabuo | Koh-Lanta | 9th Voted Out; 3rd Jury member Day 22 |
| Brice Chauvinc; 24, Anglet | Ikalu | Ikalu | Koh-Lanta | 10th Voted Out; 4th jury member Day 25 |
| Sophie Chevalier; 34, Lagos, Portugal | Tabuo | Tabuo | Koh-Lanta | 11th Voted Out; 5th jury member Day 25 |
| Angélique Mastio; 24, Cannes | Tabuo | Tabuo | Koh-Lanta | 12th Voted Out; 6th jury member Day 28 |
| Mohamed Siaaliti; 37, Strasbourg | Ikalu | Ikalu | Koh-Lanta | 13th Voted Out; 7th jury member Day 31 |
| Nicolas Van Brabant; 35, Charleroi, Belgium | Tabuo | Tabuo | Koh-Lanta | Lost Challenge; 8th jury member Day 33 |
| Maxime Berthon; 32, Poitiers | Ikalu | Ikalu | Koh-Lanta | 14th Voted Out; 9th jury member Day 34 |
| Cyril Rouanne; 37, Paris | Kama | Kama | Koh-Lanta | 15th Voted Out; 10th jury member Day 37 |
| Chloé "Clo" Dessard-Arribas; 28, Le Coudray-Macouard | Ikalu | Ikalu | Koh-Lanta | Lost Challenge; 11th jury member Day 38 |
| Aurélien Soulimant; 23, Trébeurden | Tabuo | Tabuo | Koh-Lanta | Lost Challenge; 12th jury member Day 38 |
| Steeve Demana; 46, Nice | Tabuo | Tabuo | Koh-Lanta | 16th Voted Out; 13th jury member Day 39 |
| Cindy Poumeyrol; 31, Bordeaux | Ikalu | Ikalu | Koh-Lanta | Runner-up; Day 39 |
| Maud Bamps; 50, Grez-Doiceau, Belgium | Kama | Kama | Koh-Lanta | Sole Survivor; Day 39 |

== Future appearances ==
Maxime Berthon & Cindy Poumeyrol returned to compete in Koh-Lanta: La Légende.

== Challenges ==
| Episode | Air date | Challenges | | Eliminated | Vote | Finish |
| Episode | Air date | Reward | Immunity | Eliminated | Vote | Finish |
|---|---|---|---|---|---|---|
| Episode 1 | 15 March 2019 | None | Tabuo | Frédéric | 5-1-1 | 1st voted out Day 3 |
| Episode 1 | 15 March 2019 | None | Kama | Frédéric | 5-1-1 | 1st voted out Day 3 |
| Episode 2 | 21 March 2019 (Note: This episode was exceptionnaly decaled for the 21 March 2019. The show was exceptionally off to Thursday due to the broadcast by TF1 of the Moldavia-France football match for the UEFA Euro 2020 qualifying the next day, and it was rebroadcast on 22 March 2019 on TFX.) | Ikalu | None | Aliséa | No vote | Medically evacuated Day 5 |
| Episode 2 | 21 March 2019 | Ikalu | Tabuo | Victor | 4-3 | 2nd Voted out Day 6 |
| Episode 2 | 21 March 2019 | Ikalu | Ikalu | Victor | 4-3 | 2nd Voted out Day 6 |
| Episode 3 | 29 March 2019 | Kama | Tabuo | Carinne | No vote | Medically evacuated Day 9 |
| Episode 3 | 29 March 2019 | Ikalu | Ikalu | Émilie | 3-2-1 | 3rd Voted out Day 9 (Note: Chloé played the chiefs necklace. As a result, two votes against her did not count & she is no longer chief of her tribe.) |
| Episode 4 | 5 April 2019 | Béatrice | Ikalu | Victor | 4-3 | 4th voted out Day 12 |
| Episode 4 | 5 April 2019 | Alexandre | Kama | Victor | 4-3 | 4th voted out Day 12 |
| Episode 5 | 12 April 2019 | Tabuo | Tabuo | Chloé | 4-1 | 5th voted out Day 14 |
| Episode 5 | 12 April 2019 | Kama | Ikalu | Chloé | 4-1 | 5th voted out Day 14 |
| Episode 6 | 19 April 2019 | Kama | Ikalu | Xavier | 3-1 | 6th voted out Day 16 |
| Episode 6 | 19 April 2019 | Tabuo | Tabuo | Xavier | 3-1 | 6th voted out Day 16 |
| Episode 7 | 26 April 2019 | Tabuo | None | Frédéric | 3 | 7th Voted Out; 1st jury member Day 18 (Note: As the three chiefs, Alexandre, Béatrice & Maxime had to unanimously agree to eliminate one of the contestants before the merge. If they could not unanimously agree, one of them would be eliminated. They agreed to eliminate Frédéric.) |
| Episode 7 | 26 April 2019 | Kama | None | Frédéric | 3 | 7th Voted Out; 1st jury member Day 18 |
| Episode 7 | 26 April 2019 | None | Maud | Alexandre | 6-5-3 | 8th Voted Out; 2nd jury member Day 19 |
| Episode 8 | 3 May 2019 | Maxime | Maxime | Béatrice | 8-3-2-1 | 9th Voted Out; 3rd jury member Day 22 |
| Episode 9 | 10 May 2019 | Cindy & Nicolas | Cyril & Maud | Brice & Sophie | 9-2-2 | 10th Voted Out 4th jury member 11th Voted Out 5th jury member Day 25 (Note: As each contestant was linked with another contestant, whatever happened to one of them would happen to the other. As Brice was voted off, his partner, Sophie was also eliminated.) |
| Episode 10 | 17 May 2019 | Cindy; Clo; Maud; Nicolas; Steeve | Maxime | Angélique | 6-3-3 | 12th Voted Out; 6th jury member Day 28 (Note: Maud finished last in the immunity challenge. As a result, she received a penalty vote at tribal council.) |
| Episode 11 | 24 May 2019 | Maxime [Mohamed] | Maxime | Mohamed | ~~6~~-4 | 13th Voted Out; 7th jury member Day 31 (Note: Cyril played a hidden immunity collar. As a result, six votes against him did not count.) |
| Episode 12 | 31 May 2019 | Maxime [Steeve] | Aurélien | Nicolas | No vote | Lost Challenge; 8th Jury member Day 33 |
| Episode 12 | 31 May 2019 | Maxime [Steeve] | Aurélien | Maxime | 6-2 | 14th Voted Out; 9th jury member Day 34 |
| Episode 13 | 14 June 2019 | Steeve [Cindy] | Aurélien | Cyril | 3-3 | 15th Voted Out; 10th jury member Day 37 (Note: Steeve and Cindy both played their hidden immunity collar. However, neither of them received any votes. As a result of the tie, a second cast of votes took place. This time, only Clo and Cyril could be voted for.) (Note: After the votes were tied for a second time, a draw was held to determine whether Clo or Cyril would be eliminated. Cyril lost the draw and was eliminated.) |
| Episode 14 | 21 June 2019 | Cindy; Maud; Steeve | Cindy | Clo | 0 | Lost Challenge; 11th jury member Day 38 |
| Episode 14 | 21 June 2019 | Cindy; Maud; Steeve | Cindy | Aurélien | 0 | Lost Challenge; 12th jury member Day 38 |
| Episode 14 | 21 June 2019 | Cindy; Maud; Steeve | Cindy | Steeve | 1 | 16th Voted Out; 13th jury member Day 39 |
| | | Jury vote | | | | |
| Cindy | 6/13 votes | Runner-up; Day 39 | | | | |
| Maud | 7/13 votes | Sole Survivor; Day 39 | | | | |

== Voting history ==
| # | Original Tribe | | | | Swapped Tribe | | | | | Merged Tribe | | | | | | | | | | | | |
|---|---|---|---|---|---|---|---|---|---|---|---|---|---|---|---|---|---|---|---|---|---|---|
| Episode | 1 | 2 | | 3 | | 4 | 5 | 6 | 7 | | 8 | 9 | | 10 | 11 | 12 | | 13 | | 14 | | |
| Voted out | Frédéric | Aliséa | Victor | Carinne | Émilie | Victor | Chloé | Xavier | Frédéric | Alexandre | Béatrice | Brice | Sophie | Angélique | Mohamed | Nicolas | Maxime | Cyril | | Clo | Aurélien | Steeve |
| Votes | 5-1-1 | No vote | 4-3 | No vote | 3-~~2~~-1 | 4-3 | 4-1 | 3-1 | 3 | 6-5-3 | 8-3-2-1 | 9-2-2 | No vote | 6-3-3^{4} | ~~6~~-4 | No Vote | 6-2 | ~~3~~-~~3~~-~~1~~ | 3-3 | 0 | 0 | 1 |
| Maud | | | Victor | | Xavier | | Chloé | Xavier | | Nicolas | Béatrice | Brice | | Angélique | Mohamed | | Maxime | ~~Clo~~ | Clo | | | |
| Cindy | Frédéric | | | | | | | | | Cyril | Béatrice | Brice | | Angélique | ~~Cyril~~ | | Maxime | ~~Maud~~ | Cyril | | | Steeve |
| Steeve | | | | | | Nicolas | | | | Alexandre | Maud | Brice | | Aurélien | ~~Cyril~~ | | Maxime | ~~Cyril~~ | Cyril | | | |
| Aurélien | | | | | | Victor | | | | Alexandre | Nicolas | Brice | | Maud | Mohamed | | Maxime | ~~Clo~~ | Clo | | | |
| Clo | Frédéric | | | | | | | | | Cyril | Béatrice | Brice | | Angélique | ~~Cyril~~ | | Maxime | ~~Cyril~~ | Cyril | | | |
| Cyril | | | Victor | | Émilie | | Chloé | Xavier | | Nicolas | Béatrice | Brice | | Angélique | Mohamed | | Maxime | ~~Clo~~ | Clo | | | |
| Maxime | Aliséa | | | | | | | | Frédéric | Cyril | Béatrice | Sophie | | Angélique | ~~Cyril~~ | | Cyril | ~~Cyril~~ | | | | |
| Nicolas | | | | | | Victor | | | | Alexandre | Angélique | Brice | | Angélique | ~~Cyril~~ | | | | | | | |
| Mohamed | Frédéric | | | | | | | | | Cyril | Béatrice | Brice | | Aurélien | ~~Cyril~~ | | Cyril | | | | | |
| Angélique | | | | | | Victor | | | | Alexandre | Nicolas | Brice | | Maud | Mohamed | | | | | | | |
| Sophie | | | | | | Nicolas | | | | Alexandre | Maud | Clo | | | | | | | | | | |
| Brice | Frédéric | | | | | | | | | Cyril | Béatrice | Clo | | Aurélien | | | | | | | | |
| Béatrice | | | | | | Victor | | | Frédéric | Alexandre | Maud | Sophie | | | | | | | | | | |
| Alexandre | | | Victor | | Émilie | | Chloé | Xavier | Frédéric | Nicolas | Béatrice | | | | | | | | | | | |
| Frédéric | Maxime | Returned | | | | | | | | | | | | | | | | | | | | |
| Xavier | | | Chloé | | ~~Chloé~~ | | Chloé | Alexandre | | | | | | | | | | | | | | |
| Chloé | | | Victor | | Émilie | | Xavier | | | | | | | | | | | | | | | |
| Victor | | | Chloé | Returned | | Nicolas | | | | | | | | | | | | | | | | |
| Émilie | | | Chloé | | ~~Chloé~~ | | | | | | | | | | | | | | | | | |
| Carinne | | | | Evacuated | | | | | | | | | | | | | | | | | | |
| Aliséa | Frédéric | Evacuated | | | | | | | | | | | | | | | | | | | | |
| Penalty Vote | | | | | | | | | | | | | | Maud | | | | | | | | |

Jury vote
| Episode # | 14 | |
|---|---|---|
| Day # | 39 | |
| Finalist | Cindy | Maud |
| Vote | 7-6 | |
| Juror | Vote | |
| Steeve | Cindy | |
| Aurélien | | Maud |
| Clo | Cindy | |
| Cyril | | Maud |
| Maxime | | Maud |
| Nicolas | Cindy | |
| Mohamed | Cindy | |
| Angélique | | Maud |
| Sophie | | Maud |
| Brice | Cindy | |
| Béatrice | | Maud |
| Alexandre | | Maud |
| Frédéric | Cindy | |

== Black Vote ==
Alexandre to Cyril

Béatrice to Steeve

Brice to Mohamed

Angélique to Aurélien

Mohamed to Maxime

Maxime to Clo
