= Koh-Lanta: L'Île au Trésor =

- Presented by: Denis Brogniart
- No. of days: 42
- No. of castaways: 20
- Winner: Benoît Assadi
- Location: Koh Rong, Cambodia
- No. of episodes: 14

Release
- Original release: 26 August – 9 December 2016

Season chronology
- ← Previous; Thaïlande Next → Cambodge

Koh-Lanta: L'Île au Trésor (transl. Koh-Lanta: Island of Treasure) was the sixteenth season of the French version of Survivor, Koh-Lanta. The main twist this season is that there is an island separated from the two tribes known as Treasure Island. On the island is a buried chest which contains the Golden Ring, an item which secures the owner a spot in the final five. In order to open the chest, the contestants must find ten metallic pieces, each of which points to the next marker. Once all ten pieces are found, the chest can be opened.

The season premiered on 26 August 2016 and concluded on 9 December when Benoît Assadi was crowned the title of Sole Survivor in a unanimous 10-0 jury vote against Jesta Hillmann.

== Contestants ==
Contestant	Original Tribe	Swapped Tribe	Merged Tribe	Finish
Myriam Zenasni; 36, Nice	Sambor			1st Voted Out; Day 3
Amandine Schmitt; 33, Strasbourg	Naga			2nd Voted Out; Day 6
Sophie Le Nestic Sabattier; 48, Romans-sur-Isère	Sambor			3rd Voted Out; Day 9
Sandrine Bouzekri; 33, Dijon	Naga			4th Voted Out; Day 12
Laurent Mischkind; 36, Roubaix	Sambor	Sambor		5th Voted Out; Day 15
Jean-Luc Duboscq; 50, Saint-Maximin-la-Sainte-Baume	Naga	Sambor		6th Voted Out; Day 18
Jérôme Merlier; 44, Les Auxons	Naga	Naga		Lost Duel; Day 20
Laurent "Lau" Émilien; 30, Sainte-Geneviève-des-Bois	Sambor	Sambor	Koh-Lanta	7th Voted Out; 1st jury member Day 21
Béryl Libault de la Chevasnerie; 30, Nantes	Naga	Naga	Koh-Lanta	8th Voted Out; 2nd jury member Day 24
Alexandra Pharisien; 40, Levallois-Perret	Naga	Naga	Koh-Lanta	9th Voted Out; 3rd jury member Day 27
Yannick Delalleau; 41, Vendin-lès-Béthune	Naga	Naga	Koh-Lanta	10th Voted Out; Evacuated from jury Day 30 (Note: Yannick returned to France for family reasons, thus was not a member of the jury.)
Julie Navarro-Camilleri; 38, Cabestany	Sambor	Sambor	Koh-Lanta	Lost Challenge; 4th jury member Day 32
Jérémy Raffin; 26, Paris	Naga	Naga	Koh-Lanta	11th Voted Out; 5th jury member Day 33
Stéphane Cipolla; 45, Salon-de-Provence	Sambor	Sambor	Koh-Lanta	12th Voted Out; 6th jury member Day 36
Ludivine Wiart; 31, Jaillon	Sambor	Naga	Koh-Lanta	13th Voted Out; 7th jury member Day 39
Candice Boisson; 19, Les Côtes-d'Arey	Sambor	Sambor	Koh-Lanta	Lost Challenge; 8th jury member Day 40
Bruno Troester; 56, Cernay-la-Ville	Sambor	Sambor	Koh-Lanta	Lost Challenge; 9th jury member Day 40
Freddy Bolzer; 28, Bonneuil-sur-Marne	Naga	Naga	Koh-Lanta	14th Voted Out; 10th jury member Day 41
Jesta Hillmann; 24, Toulouse	Naga	Naga	Koh-Lanta	Runner-up; Day 42
Benoît Assadi; 22, Lorient	Sambor	Sambor	Koh-Lanta	Sole Survivor; Day 42

== Voting history ==
#	Original Tribe																				
Episode	1	2	3	4	5	6	7		8	9	10	11		12		13	finalist	winner			
Eliminated	Myriam	Amandine	Sophie	Sandrine	Laurent	Jean-Luc	Jérôme	Lau	Béryl	Alexandra	Yannick	Julie	Jérémy	Egality	Stéphane	Ludivine	Candice	Bruno	Freddy	Jesta	Benoît
Votes	9-10	7-10	8-10	7-10	5-9	6-8	0 (Note: Jérôme was eliminated following the ambassadors' duel. Unable to reach an agreement, a draw was held between the two ambassadors, and Jérôme was eliminated.)	7-15	6-13 (Note: Having found the gold ring, Benoît reveals it to the yellow team. All votes against him are cancelled, therefore Béryl is eliminated.)	6-11	5-11	0	5-9	-	4-7	4-7	0	0	1	0-10	10-10
Benoît	Myriam		Sophie		Laurent	Jean-Luc		Jérémy	Béryl	Alexandra	Yannick		Freddy	Stéphane	Stéphane	Ludivine			Freddy		Jury final
Jesta		Alexandra		Alexandra				Lau	~~Benoît~~	(Note: Jesta was unable to participate in the immunity challenge. She is therefore untouchable at the tribal council, but she cannot vote..)	Julie		Ludivine	Stéphane	Stéphane	Ludivine					Jury final
Freddy		Alexandra		Sandrine				Lau	~~Benoît~~	Bruno	Julie		Jérémy	Stéphane	Stéphane	Ludivine					Benoît
Bruno	Myriam		Sophie		Laurent	Jean-Luc		Jérémy	Béryl	Alexandra	Yannick		Jérémy	Freddy	Freddy	Jesta					Benoît
Candice	Myriam		Sophie		Laurent	Jean-Luc		Jérémy	Béryl	Alexandra	Yannick		Jérémy	Stéphane	Stéphane	Ludivine					Benoît
Ludivine	Myriam		Sophie					Lau	~~Benoît~~	Bruno	Candice		Jérémy	Freddy	Freddy	Jesta					Benoît
Stéphane	Myriam		Sophie		Laurent	Jean-Luc		Jérémy	Béryl	Alexandra	Yannick		Jérémy	Freddy	Freddy	~~Freddy~~					Benoît
Jérémy		Amandine		Sandrine				Lau	~~Benoït~~	Alexandra	Freddy		Freddy	Freddy							Benoît
Julie	Myriam		Sophie		Laurent	Jean-Luc		Jérémy	Béryl	Alexandra	Yannick										Benoît
Yannick		Amandine		Sandrine				Lau	~~Benoït~~	Candice	Candice		~~Julie~~								
Alexandra		Amandine		Sandrine				Lau	~~Benoît~~	Julie	Candice										Benoït
Béryl		Amandine		Sandrine				Lau	~~Benoït~~	~~Jesta~~											Benoît
Lau	Myriam		Sophie		Laurent	Jean-Luc		Jérémy	Jérémy												Benoît
Jérôme		Amandine		Sandrine																	
Jean-Luc		Amandine		Sandrine	Laurent	Bruno		~~Bruno~~ (Note: Since Bruno won individual immunity, Jean-Luc's black vote is cancelled.)													
Laurent	Myriam		Sophie		Julie	Lau															
Sandrine		Amandine		Jean-Luc				~~Jean-Luc~~ (Note: Since Jean-Luc had already been eliminated at the previous council, Sandrine's black vote no longer had any value.)													
Sophie	Myriam		Lau		Lau																
Amandine		Alexandra		Alexandra																	
Myriam	Sophie		Laurent																		

== Future appearances ==
Candice Boisson, Jérémy Raffin and Julie Navarro-Camilleri later returned for Koh-Lanta: Le Combat des Héros. Boisson returned for a third time for Koh-Lanta: La Légende.

== Future appearances (Fort Boyard) ==
Candice Boisson and Jérémy Raffin later returned for Fort Boyard 2019.
