= Koh-Lanta: Le Combat des Héros =

- Presented by: Denis Brogniart
- No. of days: 32
- No. of castaways: 18
- Winner: Clémence Castel
- Location: Yasawa Islands, Fiji
- No. of episodes: 11

Release
- Original release: 16 March – 25 May 2018

Season chronology
- ← Previous; Fidji Next → Koh-Lanta 19 (Cancelled); La Guerre des Chefs

Koh-Lanta: Le Combat des Héros (transl. "Koh-Lanta: The Battle of Heroes") is the 22nd season and the 5th All-Star season of the French version of Survivor, Koh-Lanta. This season, like last season, takes place in Fiji on the Yasawa Islands, and airs on TF1. The main twist this season is that after a contestant is voted out, they are sent to L'île de l'Exil (transl. "The Island of Exile") where they will face against other eliminated contestants for a chance to return to the game. This is the first season in which contestants who are eliminated in circumstances that do not involve being voted off are not replaced by the last eliminated contestant. The season premiered on 16 March 2018 and concluded on 25 May 2018 where Clémence Castel was crowned as the Sole Survivor in a close 5-4 jury vote against Pascal Salviani becoming the first two-time winner of Koh-Lanta.

== Contestants ==
Contestant	Original Tribe	Swapped Tribe	Merged Tribe	Voted Out	Exile Island	Finish
Chantal Ménard; 48, Vannes; Johor	Wakaï			2nd Voted Out; Day 3	Lost Duel; Day 5	18th
Julie Navarro-Camilleri; 39, Perpignan; L'Île au Trésor	Wakaï			1st Voted Out; Day 1	Lost Duel; Day 8	17th
Cédric Giosserand-Lucas; 38, Paris; Johor	Wakaï			4th Voted Out; Day 9	Lost Duel; Day 11	16th
Olivier Moenaert; 50, Lambersart; Raja Ampat	Wakaï	Wakaï		Medically evacuated Day 12		15th
Tiffany Gounin; 22, Marseille; Fidji	Toa	Wakaï		5th Voted Out; Day 12	Lost Duel; Day 14	14th
Raphaële Navarro; 38, Alès; Palau	Wakaï			3rd Voted Out; Day 6	Lost Duel; Day 17	13th
Ludovic Laresche; 39, Montbéliard; Vanuatu	Wakaï	Toa		7th Voted Out; Day 17		12th
Dylan Thiry; 23, Luxembourg City, Luxembourg; Cambodge	Wakaï	Wakaï	Koh-Lanta	Lost Challenge; 1st jury member Day 20		11th
Clémentine Jullien; 26, Annecy; Cambodge	Wakaï	Wakaï		6th Voted Out; Day 15	Lost Duel; 2nd jury member Day 20	10th
Jérémy Raffin; Returned to Game	Toa	Toa	Koh-Lanta	8th Voted Out; Day 18	Won Duel; Day 20	
Candice Boisson; 21, Les Côtes-d'Arey; L'Île au Trésor	Wakaï	Toa	Koh-Lanta	9th Voted Out; 3rd jury member Day 21		9th
Alban Pellegrin; 30, Charbonnières-les-Bains; Johor	Toa	Wakaï	Koh-Lanta	10th Voted Out; 4th jury member Day 24		8th
Yassin Metiri; 40, Bordeaux; Cambodge	Toa	Toa	Koh-Lanta	11th Voted Out; 5th jury member Day 24		7th
Cassandre Girard; 24, Sydney, Australia; Thaïlande	Toa	Toa	Koh-Lanta	12th Voted Out; 6th jury member Day 27		6th
Nathalie Ensargueix; 38, Montfermeil; Caramoan	Toa	Toa	Koh-Lanta	13th Voted Out; 7th jury member Day 30		5th
Javier Rodriguez; 44, Jette, Belgium; Malaisie	Toa	Toa	Koh-Lanta	Lost Challenge; 8th jury member Day 31		4th
Jérémy Raffin; 27, Grenoble; L'Île au Trésor	Toa	Toa	Koh-Lanta	14th Voted Out; 9th jury member Day 32		3rd
Pascal Salviani; 50, Cagnes-sur-Mer; Thaïlande	Toa	Wakaï	Koh-Lanta	Runner-Up; Day 32		2nd
Clémence Castel; 32, Saint-Lô; Pacifique & Le Retour des Héros	Toa	Wakaï	Koh-Lanta	Sole Survivor; Day 32		1st

== Futures appearances ==
Clémentine Jullien, Candice Boisson and Clémence Castel returned to compete in Koh-Lanta: La Légende.

== Challenges ==
Air date	Challenge		Exile Island Inhabitants	Exile Island Elimination	Eliminated	Vote	Finish
Air date	Reward	Immunity	Exile Island Inhabitants	Exile Island Elimination	Eliminated	Vote	Finish
16 March 2018	None	Toa	None	None	Julie	8-1	1st Voted Out; Day 1
16 March 2018	None	Toa	None	None	Chantal	5-2-1	2nd Voted Out; Day 3
23 March 2018	Toa	Toa	Julie & Chantal	Chantal	Raphaële	6-1	3rd Voted Out; Day 6
30 March 2018	Toa	Toa	Julie & Raphaële	Julie	Cédric	5-1	4th Voted Out; Day 9
6 April 2018	Dylan & Yassin	Toa	Raphaële & Cédric	Cédric	Olivier	0	Medically evacuated Day 12
6 April 2018	Dylan & Yassin	Toa	Raphaële & Cédric	Cédric	Tiffany	~~5~~-1	5th Voted Out; Day 12
13 April 2018	Wakaï	Toa	Raphaële & Tiffany	Tiffany	Clémentine	3-2	6th Voted Out; Day 15
20 April 2018	Toa	Candice	Raphaële & Clémentine	Raphaële	Ludovic	2	7th Voted Out; Day 17
20 April 2018	Toa	Candice	Raphaële & Clémentine	Raphaële	Jérémy	~~4-4-3~~/7-3	8th Voted Out; Day 18
27 April 2018	Pascal Yassin; Clémence; Cassandre	Yassin	Clémentine & Jérémy	Clémentine	Dylan	0	Lost Challenge; 1st Jury Member; Day 20
27 April 2018	Pascal Yassin; Clémence; Cassandre	Yassin	Clémentine & Jérémy	Clémentine	Clémentine	0	Lost Duel; 2nd Jury Member; Day 20
27 April 2018	Pascal Yassin; Clémence; Cassandre	Yassin	Clémentine & Jérémy	Clémentine	Candice	5-4	9th Voted Out; 3rd Jury Member; Day 21
4 May 2018	Cassandre & Nathalie	Javier & Pascal			Alban & Yassin	7-2	10th Voted Out 4th Jury Member; 11th Voted Out 5th Jury Member; Day 24
11 May 2018	Nathalie	Clémence			Cassandre	4-2-1	11th Voted Out; 6th Jury Member; Day 27
11 May 2018	Nathalie	Clémence			Cassandre	4-2-1	11th Voted Out; 6th Jury Member; Day 27
18 May 2018	Pascal	Javier			Nathalie	~~3~~-3	12th Voted Out; 7th Jury Member; Day 30
25 May 2018		Jérémy; Clémence; Pascal			Javier	0	Lost Challenge; 8th Jury Member; Day 31

== Voting history ==
	Original Tribes				Switched Tribes				Merged Tribe									
► Episode	1		2	3	4		5	6			7		8		9	10	11	
► Eliminated	Julie	Chantal	Raphaële	Cédric	Olivier	Tiffany	Clémentine	Ludovic	Jérémy		Dylan	Candice	Alban	Yassin	Cassandre	Nathalie	Javier	Jérémy
► Votes	8-1	5-2-1	6-1	5-1	0	~~5~~-1	3-2	2	~~4-4-3~~	7-3	0	5-4	7-2	0	4-2-1	~~3~~-3	0	1
▼ Contestants	Votes																	
Clémence						~~Clémentine~~	Clémentine		Jérémy	Jérémy		Candice	Alban		Nathalie	~~Jérémy~~		
Pascal						~~Clémentine~~	Clémentine		Nathalie	Jérémy		Candice	Alban		Nathalie	Nathalie		Jérémy
Jérémy									Javier	Javier		Nathalie	Alban		Cassandre	Nathalie		
Javier									Nathalie	Jérémy		Candice	Alban		Cassandre	Nathalie		
Nathalie									Javier	Javier		Candice	Alban		Cassandre	~~Jérémy~~		
Cassandre									Jérémy	Jérémy		Candice	Alban		Jérémy	~~Jérémy~~		
Yassin								Ludovic	Nathalie	Jérémy		Nathalie	Jérémy					
Alban						~~Clémentine~~	Dylan		Jérémy	Jérémy		Nathalie	Jérémy		Cassandre			
Candice	Julie	Raphaële	Raphaële	Cédric					Javier	Javier		Nathalie	Alban					
Clémentine	Julie	Chantal	Raphaële	Cédric		Tiffany	Dylan											
Dylan	Julie	Chantal	Raphaële	Cédric		~~Clémentine~~	Clémentine	Ludovic	Jérémy	Jérémy								
Ludovic	Julie	Chantal	Raphaële	Cédric														
Raphaële	Julie	Candice	Cédric															
Tiffany						~~Clémentine~~												
Olivier	Julie	Chantal	Raphaële	Cédric														
Cédric	Julie	Chantal	Raphaële	Clémentine														
Julie	Clémentine																	
Chantal	Julie	Raphaële																
Penalty Vote									Javier						~~Clémence~~			

Jury vote
Episode #	11	
Day #	32	
Finalist	Clémence	Pascal
Vote	5-4	
Juror	Vote	
Jérémy		Pascal
Javier		Pascal
Nathalie		Pascal
Cassandre		Pascal
Yassin	Clémence	
Alban	Clémence	
Candice	Clémence	
Clémentine	Clémence	
Dylan	Clémence	
