= Luisa Massimo =

Italian paediatrician (1928–2016)

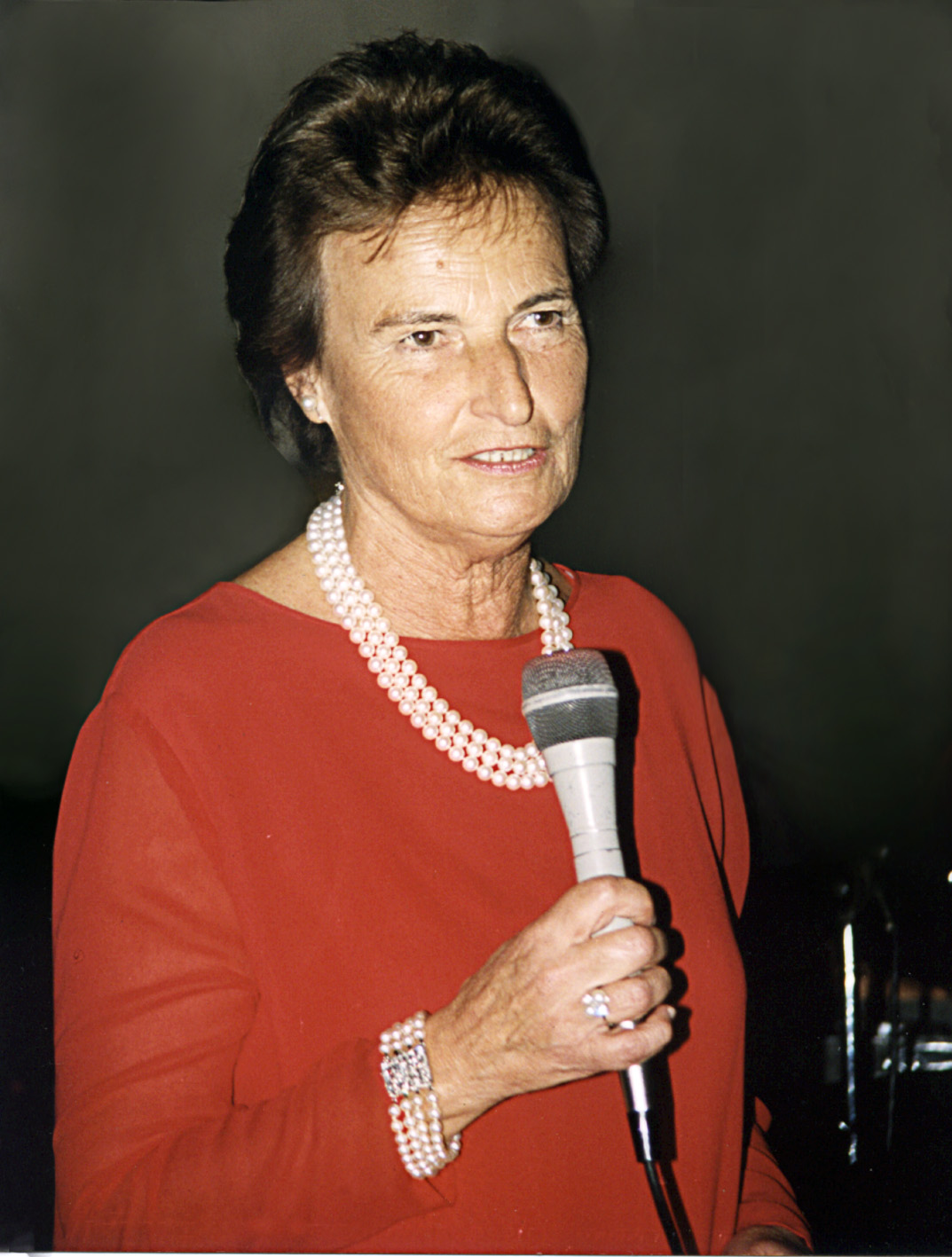
- Luisa Massimo in New York
- Born: 22 December 1928; Genoa, Italy
- Died: 5 October 2016 (aged 87); Genoa, Italy
- Education: University of Genoa
- Scientific career
- Fields: Pediatrics

Luisa Massimo (22 December 1928 – 5 October 2016) was an Italian pediatrician. From 1972 to 1997 she was the director of the 4th Division of Pediatrics (Hematology and Oncology) of the Children's Hospital Istituto Giannina Gaslini of Genoa. From 1998 she is director emeritus. She is internationally considered one of the founders of Pediatric oncology

Since April 2003 she was consultant of Pediatric Psycho-Oncology and International Affairs. Since 1996 she is Expert Evaluator in Ethics and Clinical Bioethics of the European Commission. She taught Pediatric Oncology and Pediatric Hematology at the graduate schools of Pediatrics, of Hematology and of Oncology in the University of Genoa. From 1986 to 1994 she was President of the "IST-National Institute for cancer research” in Genoa.

A member of several scientific commissions (national and international), she has published 300 scientific works including 220 indexed on PubMed. She is an honorary citizen of Baltimore (United States), of La Paz in Bolivia, of Bogotá in Colombia, and Rochefort-du-Gard in France. She received numerous awards: among them, in 1971 the "Gianni Pauletta" for Oncology, by the Accademia Nazionale dei Lincei, in 1991 the "American Italian Cancer Foundation's Prize for Scientific Excellence in Medicine" in New York City, in 2004 she was decorated with the Gold Medal of Italian Republic for merit of public health (Rome, Quirinale), in 2011 with the Gold Medal “Master of Pediatrics" by the Italian Society of Pediatrics.

== Family and education ==
But in my heart, looking in the mirror the days of my life, the people I have met in any part of the world, efforts to honor the values I believe in, the choice of medicine as the reason of my life and the desire to spend myself for the youngest patients and less curable, I feel that my parents and the type of education they gave me are the basis of everything I was able to realize and appreciate

The Massimo family after the First World War was spread over several continents. Only her father settled in Genoa. They have deep roots, from Veneto and Piedmont to the United States, South Africa, several countries in Europe and South America. Luisa Massimo's great-grandfather Giovanni Battista Mantovani studied medicine at the end of the 18th century at the University of Padua, and practiced in Rovigo. The grandfather Diodato Massimo was a painter, graduated at the famous Academia of Venice. Living at the Court of Vienna, he was considered a traitor and in 1914 interned at the Lager of Katzenau in Austria with most of his family. After his death he received great honors, a street and the conference room of the Library of Badia Polesine where he was born were named after him. Two of his paintings are exhibited at the Österreichische Galerie Belvedere in Vienna art museum.

Her father was born in Trento, and was a great lover of classical music since his youth. After internment at Katzenau during the First World War, he was enlisted in the Inter-Allied Commission, and remained at the Italian diplomatic service until 1923. Graduated in design, he wrote a number of articles of historical and political interest in Italy and Germany. The Piedmontese mother, despite humble beginnings, cultivated studies becoming a primary school teacher. They married in Turin on April 3, 1926. Luisa Maria Elena Massimo was born on December 22, 1928. In 1931 her sister Elena Maria Laura was born. In 1933 the father won the tender for the construction of the Institute Giannina Gaslini, defining event for the economy of the family business of building materials. In 1935 Germany began the race first persecution of the Jews and family Massimo was a lifeline for many of them. On March 13, 1938 the Nazis occupied Vienna and began the Holocaust. This tragic event also touched the family of Luisa Massimo. During the Second World War they moved in a village of the Riviera. In those years, Luisa decided to study medicine.

== Medical studies ==
The journalist and friend Pier Luigi Bagatin of the University Cà Foscari of Venice, writes about the professional choice of Luisa Massimo:

One day in 1942, a young girl 14 years old makes a deal with herself under the olive trees on a hill watching the sea and the coast of Portofino. If she will survive the war, she would study medicine, she wished to become a good doctor devoted to research. Just to reach her objective she promised herself to be alone

In 1947 she entered the Faculty of Medicine in Genoa. Completed the first year, she took part to the fifteen-day meeting of the European youth in Germany. She continued her studies in Genoa, but she could integrate them each year from July to December at the London University. Luisa was the first foreign student to ask to attend the London University. She was assigned to the second year of Medicine at St. Mary's Hospital in Paddington, becoming a student also of Alexander Fleming, who was then Emeritus, but still active. To live in London offered her another opportunity: she met Winston Churchill as a painter both of the English country and of Morocco. In London she applied for a rotating internship in the United States, to start soon after the end of the Medical studies. On 20 July 1953 she graduated cum laude discussing an experimental thesis on one of the first anticancer drugs. Few days after, from the Port of Genoa she left for the United States and started to work at the Woman's Medical College of Pennsylvania in Philadelphia. She attended also the famous "Children's Hospital" by participating to several meetings. She became also member of the Medical Women's International Association. After a year in Philadelphia she attended for a month the pediatric ward of The Johns Hopkins University School of Medicine in Baltimore.

== Clinical and scientific career ==
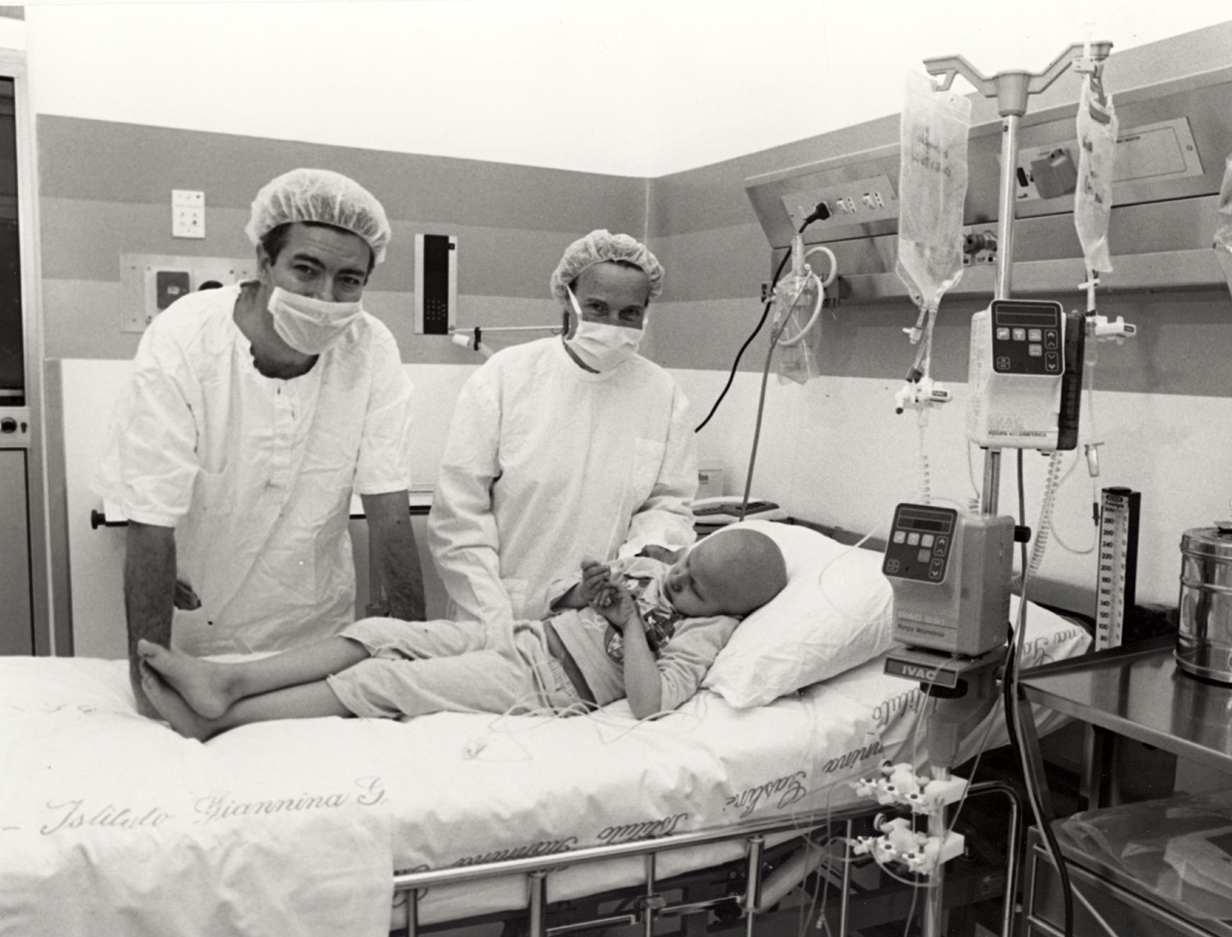
Luisa Massimo (right) at work in the Istituto Gaslini in Genoa

With this cultural baggage she returned at Gaslini in Genoa. She focused the postgraduate School of Pediatrics in a year. She specialized on 1955 with 60/60 cum laude with a thesis of experimental Oncology. In 1958 she was assigned by Professor Giovanni De Toni of a scholarship funded by the Italian Ministry of Health, to attend the first International Course of Pediatric Oncology in Paris. Back from Paris at the end of 1959, she was entrusted with the task to take care of children with leukemia and cancer. Charlotte Tan, professor at the Memorial Sloan Kettering Cancer Center in New York, was her partner. In July 1959 she received the promotion to assistant professor in charge. She published many articles, mostly in Italian Journals. Furthermore, Luisa Massimo spent a short time in the Kinderspital Zürich, where she collaborated with Walter Hitzig testing new drugs such as azathioprine (an immunosuppressant) whose results were published in the leading hematological journal Blood. Such research is considered a milestone in the study of transplants, mostly of kidney.

She worked as well with Nasrollah Shaidi, a researcher of the University of Wisconsin, in the field of severe bone marrow aplasia. In spring 1960 she attended in Basel the first International theoretical and practical course in cytogenetics, funded by the Ministry of Health. Back in Gaslini in 1962, she managed to organize a new Laboratory of cytogenetics. In April of the same year she became Professor of Pediatrics after a three days examination at the University of Rome. In 1966 the entrepreneur Dr. Vittorio Rollero and his wife Gianna, because of their 6 years old daughter admitted for leukemia, understood the financial difficulties of the Department, mostly for the heavy costs of drugs. They created the “Children’s Cancer and Leukemia Fund” to help and increase the tight budget. In 1972 a big amount of money allowed the birth of a new division named “Medicine 4th”.

Since 1959 the relationship with Odile Schweisguth was a continuous help. Luisa Massimo and Renée Maurus of Brussels urged her for the creation of a Society of pediatric oncology. SIOP was founded in Paris in 1968. The first congress of the International Society of Paediatric Oncology was held in 1969 in Madrid. Luisa Massimo organized the Sixth Congress (1974) in Santa Margherita Ligure together with the 4th Congress of the European Society of Pediatric Hematology and Immunology – ESPHI, and the foundation of the Italian Society of Pediatric Heamatology and Oncology. Since those years, considering also her knowledge of several languages she was invited to teach or to give seminars in several universities in Europe and other continents (Spain, Germany, Nigeria, Brasil, Mexico, Iceland, Argentina, Bolivia, Colombia, India, Japan, Australia, China, Ecuador, Jamaica).

== Awards and prizes ==
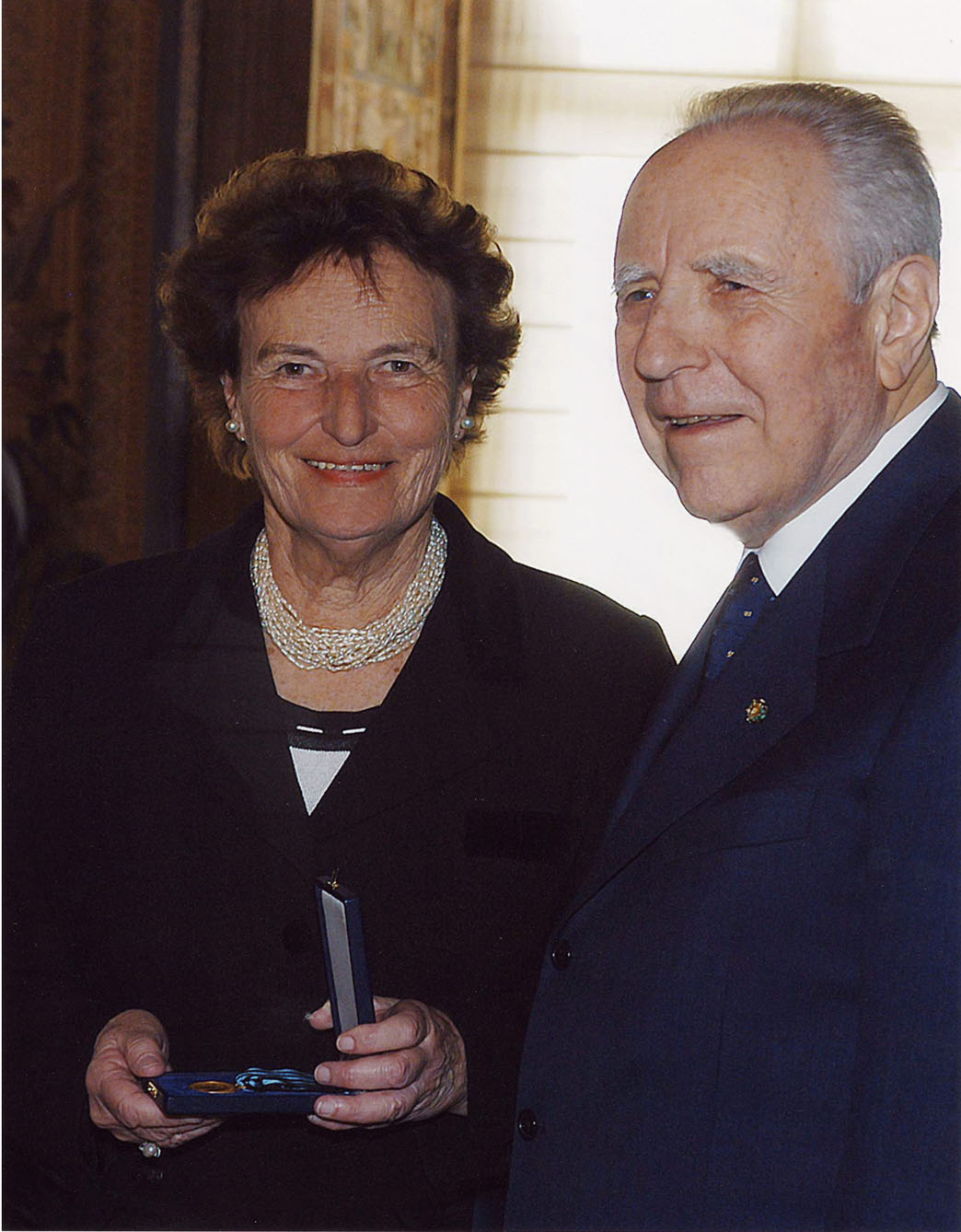
Luisa Massimo receives the golden medal for merit in public health by former Italian president Carlo Azeglio Ciampi(2004)

- 1971: award for Oncology conferred by the Italian Ministry of Education (Accademia Nazionale dei Lincei, Rome 18 June 1971)
- 1991: the "American Italian Cancer Foundation's Prize for Scientific Excellence in Medicine" in New York
- 2004: Golden Medal of Italian Republic for merit of public health (Rome, Quirinale),
- 2011: Golden Medal “Master of Pediatrics" by the Italian Society of Pediatrics

== Bibliography ==
- Luisa Massimo, Dentro la nostra vita. Ricordi di una pediatra oncologa, Terra Ferma, Genova 2008, pp. 210
- Antonio Infante, Luca Borghi (eds.), Ai bambini e ai fiori, lo splendore del sole. Il ruolo dell'Istituto Gaslini nella storia della pediatria, Rizzoli, Milano 2015, pp. 219–233 and 463-464
- Italo Farnetani, I venticinque pediatri, decorati con la Medaglia d'oro della sanità, hanno scritto la storia della Repubblica, prefazione del ministro della salute Beatrice Lorenzin, «Pediatria Preventiva & Sociale» 2016; 11 (3), pp 10–21- https://www.sipps.it/pdf/rivista/2016_03.pdf
