= European Society for Paediatric Oncology =

European professional organisation

The European Society for Paediatric Oncology (SIOPE or SIOP Europe) is an organisation representing all professionals working in the field of childhood cancers in Europe. SIOPE has more than 1,680 members across 35 European countries.

Established in 1998 as the European branch of the International Society of Paediatric Oncology (SIOP), SIOPE became an independent organisation with a permanent office in Brussels (Belgium) in 2007.

== Activities ==
SIOPE aims to support education for health professionals and facilitate new drugs development by participating in EU-funded projects such as: The Joint Action on Rare Cancers (JARC) or The European Reference Network on Paediatric Cancer (ERN PaedCan). SIOPE led the preparation of the "European Standards of care for Children with Cancer", a document that was published in 2009 and translated into 21 languages.

SIOPE has also been involved in several discussions with EU policy-makers on the revision and assessment of EU legislation on paediatric medicines. Every year, SIOPE marks the International Childhood Cancer Day, which is a one-day event organised at the European Parliament in Brussels, in order to raise awareness on the growing challenges posed by this disease.

== The Strategic Plan ==
On 18 November 2015, the SIOPE Strategic Plan "A European Cancer Plan for Children and Adolescents" was officially launched at the European Parliament during a key event hosted by MEP Alojz Peterle and co-organised by SIOPE and the ‘MEPs Against Cancer’ Group. The main goal of the plan is to improve both the cure rate and the quality of life for survivors of childhood cancer, with the ultimate aim of increasing disease-free and late-effect free survival. This document presents the seven medical and scientific objectives that should be achieved for the next decade in order to increase the cure rate and the quality of survivorship for children and young people with cancer.
