= Nicolas Janny =

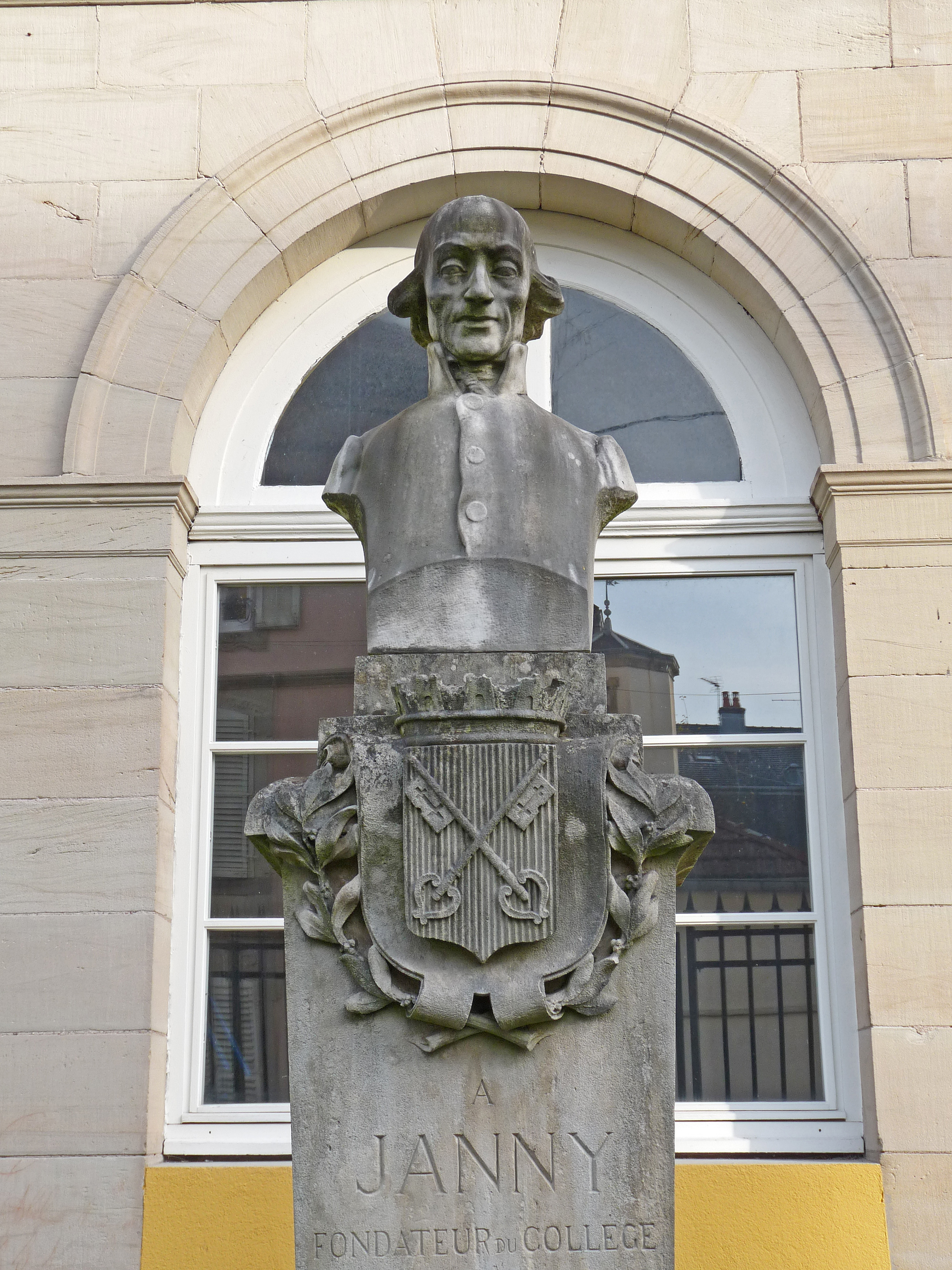
- Bust of Nicolas Janny in Remiremont (1906)
- Born: 19 March 1749; Metz
- Died: 6 February 1822 (aged 72); Remiremont

Nicolas Janny (19 March 1749 – 6 February 1822) was an 18th–19th-century French priest, pedagogue and grammarian. He was first principal of the college of Remiremont.

== Bibliography ==
- Pierre Heili, « Nicolas Janny » in Albert Ronsin (dir.), Les Vosgiens célèbres. Dictionnaire biographique illustré, Éditions Gérard Louis, Vagney, 1990, (p. 204) ISBN 2-907016-09-1
- F. A. Puton, « L'abbé Janny, ancien principal du collège de Remiremont », in Mémoires de l'Académie Stanislas, 1887
