= Fernand Bachmann =

20th-century French racing driver

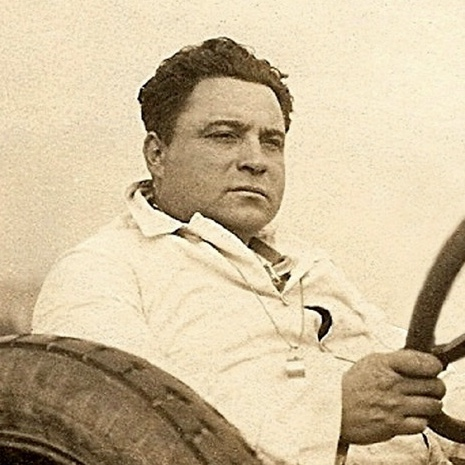
- Nationality: (France) French
- Born: 6 June 1886; Remiremont, France
- Died: 22 May 1965 (aged 78); Brienon-sur-Armançon, France

24 Hours of Le Mans career
- Years: 1923–1924
- Teams: Chenard and Walcker
- Best finish: 7th (1923)

Fernand Bachmann (6 June 1886 – 22 May 1965) was a car dealer, administrator of the Chenard & Walcker establishments and French racing driver. In 1923, Fernand Bachmann finished 7th in the first edition of the 24 Hours of Le Mans.

== Biography ==
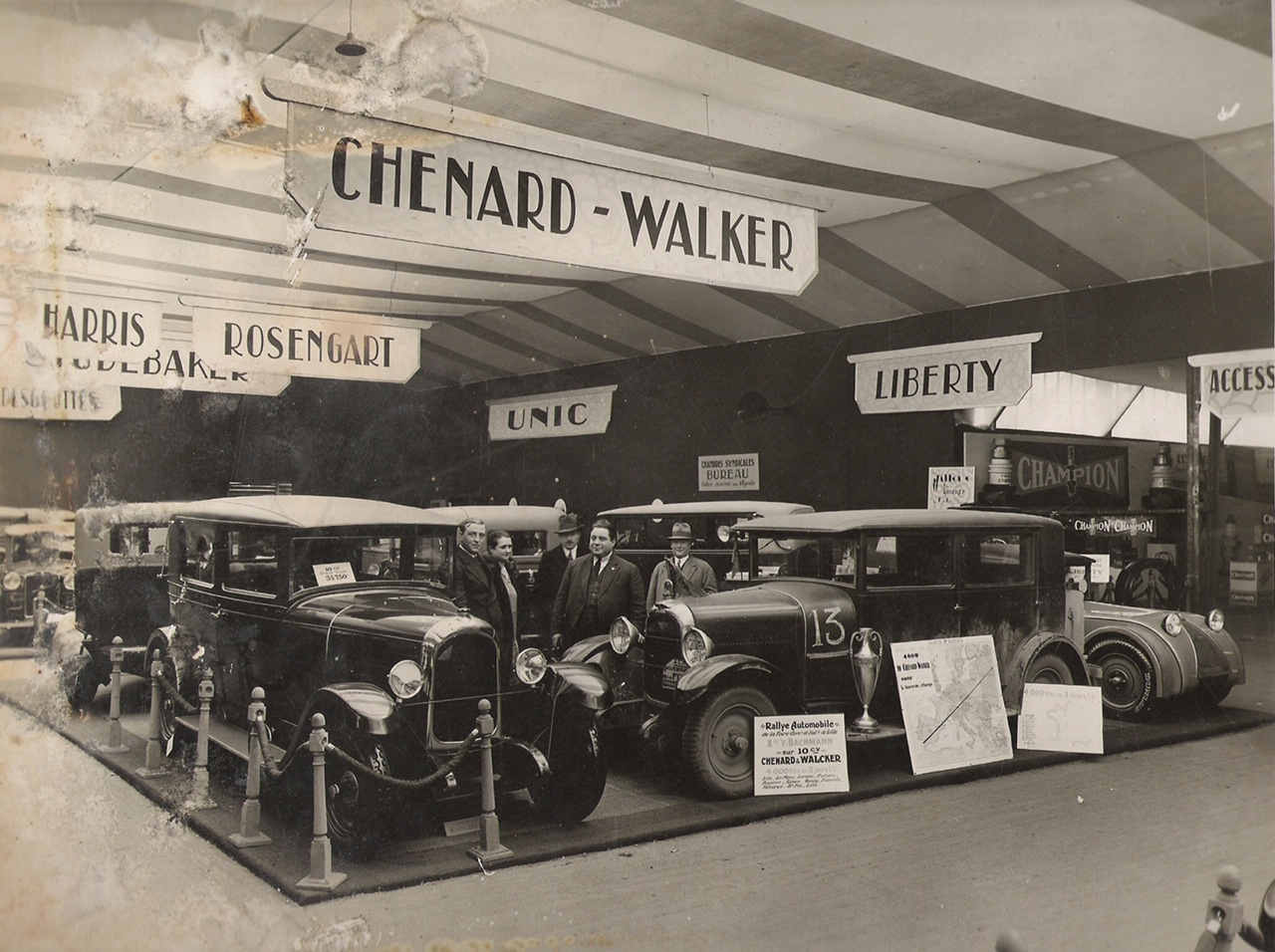
Chenard and Walcker exposition with Fernand Bachmann

Fernand Bachmann was born on 6 June 1886 in Remiremont, France, and died on 22 May 1965 in Brienon-sur-Armançon. He was a car dealer, administrator of the Chenard and Walcker establishments, and a French car driver with Chenard & Walcker race team.

Fernand Bachmann was a car dealer in France at La Madeleine, in the North, near Lille.

He represented the Chenard & Walcker cars, and he was the administrator of the brand's establishments in France.

=== 24 Hours of Le Mans ===
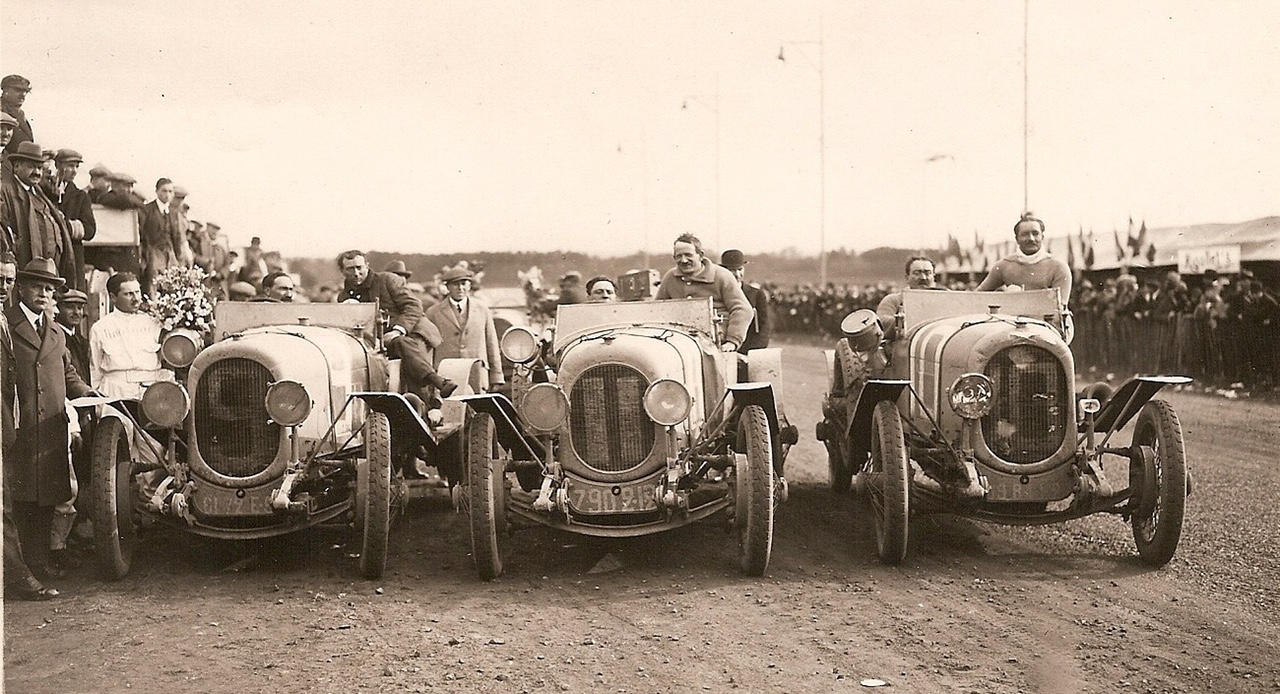
Team Chenard and Walcker – 24 Hours of Le Mans 1923

In 1923, Fernand Bachmann participated in the first edition of the 24 Hours of Le Mans organized on the Circuit de la Sarthe the 26 and 27 May 1923 by the Automobile Club de l'Ouest, on board one of the three Chenard et Walcker 3.0L S4 cars.

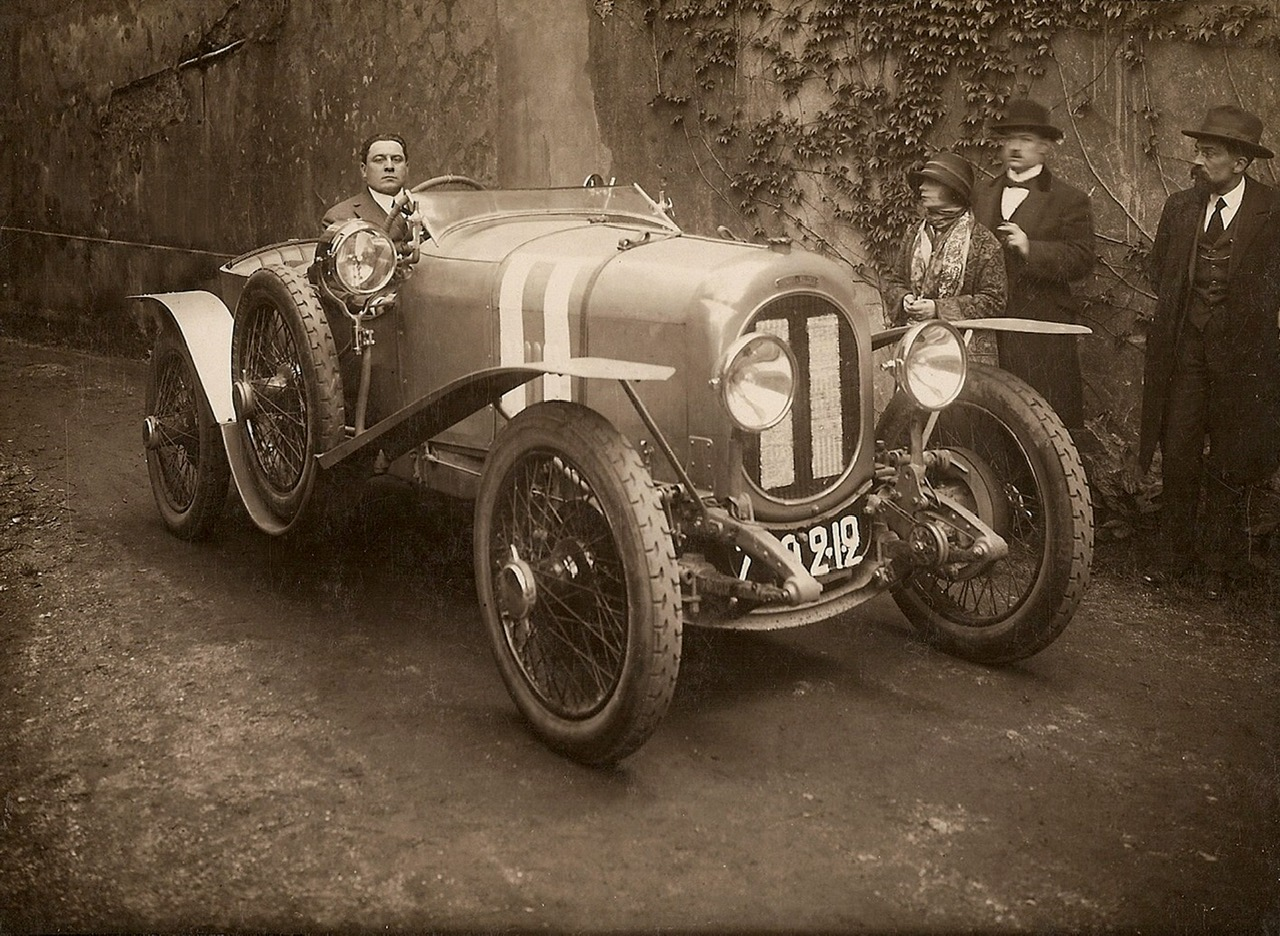
Fernand Bachmann – Chenard & Walcker #11

The team Fernand Bachmann and Raymond Glaszmann (#11) finished the race in 7th place, while his brother Raoul and Christian Dauvergne (#10) placed 2nd. The victory went to the third Chenard–Walcker 15 HP Tourism team (n°9) piloted by André Lagache and René Léonard, and thus form the first hat-trick of the historic race of Le Mans 24 Hours.

The following year, he participated at 1924 24 Hours of Le Mans with his brother on the new Chenard & Walcker Type TT 12CV 2-litres. However, because of a spectacular road exit, they did not finish the race.

Fernand Bachmann then continued his racing career by participating in numerous international races such as the Spa 24 Hours in 1925 and the 24 Hours of San Sebastián in 1926.

== Bibliography ==
- Clausager, Anders (1982) Le Mans London: Arthur Barker Ltd ISBN 0-213-16846-4
- Laban, Brian (2001) Le Mans 24 Hours London: Virgin Books ISBN 1-85227-971-0
- Spurring, Quentin (2015) Le Mans 1923–29 Yeovil, Somerset: Haynes Publishing ISBN 978-1-91050-508-3
