= Odile Schweisguth =

French physician (1913–2002)

- Born: 18 October 1913; Remiremont, France
- Died: 26 March 2002 (aged 88); Cotâpre in Molphey, France
- Education: University of Paris
- Occupation: Pediatric oncology
- Known for: Pioneer of pediatric oncology
- Children: Jacques

Odile Schweisguth (1913-2002) was a French physician who is considered the pioneer of pediatric oncology in Europe and was the founder of the first child cancer department at the Institut Gustave Roussy (IGR) in Villejuif.

== Life and work ==
Schweisguth was born on 18 October 1913 in Remiremont in the Vosges department in France.

=== Education ===
After training in the Red Cross Nursing School, she started her medical studies in Nancy in 1932. In 1934, her family moved to Paris and she joined them. She continued her studies in the University of Paris, where she received her first medical degree in 1936. After the Second World War, she obtained her doctorate in 1946, with a thesis in oncology under the direction of Pierre Ameuille.

She then directed her medical interests to pediatrics and started to work with Robert Debré at the Necker-Enfants Malades Hospital in Paris. She eventually became one of its chief clinicians.

=== Villejuif cancer center ===
In 1948, René Huguenin, a professor of pathology and director of the Institut Gustave Roussy (IGR) in Villejuif, south of Paris, one the world's leading cancer centers, wanted to open a pediatric section. He invited Schweisguth to join the staff. She started as a consultant and became the head of the pediatric oncology ward, the first one of its kind in Europe, in April 1952.

According to her obituary, Schweisguth was instrumental in the work there.

For Professor Jean-Michel Zucker, current head of the department of oncological pediatrics at the Institut Curie in Paris, she played, with a few American specialists, an essential role, that of the pioneers who managed to clear a medical field that had been practically ignored before. This is the era of identification, the classification and the first therapeutic trials of the various cancerous lesions that can affect the youngest; an undertaking all the more thankless in that it hardly interested the medical profession, most of these affections being considered as definitively incurable.

Beginning in the 1960s, the Villejuif care center became a training center for international specialists who wanted to work in the child cancer treatment departments that were just opening in several other European hospitals. At about the same time, Schweisguth and several of her colleagues created the International Society of Pediatric Oncology in 1969, of which she was the first president and which today has nearly one thousand members.

In 1970, she was a prominent signer of an impassioned plea that defended the needs of cancerous children under the title "Faut-il-les permissoirs? (Should they be permitted?)" that appeared in the French Archives of Pediatrics. She advocated for the children by citing the many advances that had been made in the young discipline of childhood cancer and advanced the "immense scientific interest of this specialty" and the essential need for psychological support for the parents as well as the sick child.

Her obituary mentions that she combined "an acute intellectual curiosity with a disturbing and fruitful non-conformity, Dr. Schweisguth has shown modesty and scientific humility throughout her professional life. This moral attitude, which she baptized realism, was in no way unrelated to the optimism and courage she instilled in families."

She retired from the institute but not from the profession in 1978.

== Personal life ==
Many years later, she decided to adopt one of the children, Jacques, she had cared for when she was already an adult.

She retired from the Institut Gustave Roussy in 1978. She died on 26 March 2002 at her home in Cotâpre in Molphey in Côte-d'Or.

== Awards ==
- 1997: co-winner of the Antoine-Lacassagne prize, awarded by the National League against Cancer, with Thierry Philip.
- 1999: Knight of the Legion of Honor

== Bibliography ==
- Arty R. Coppes-Zantinga, Jean-Michel Zucker, and Max J. Coppes, "Odile Schweisguth, MD, Alma Mater of Pediatric Oncology", Medical and Pediatric Oncology 34:59–60 (2000)
- Luisa Massimo, "Odile Schweisguth: Pioneer of European Pediatric Oncology", Pediatric Hematology and Oncology, 20:75–77, 2003
