= Koh-Lanta: Johor =

- Presented by: Denis Brogniart
- No. of days: 40
- No. of castaways: 20
- Winner: Marc Rambaud
- Runner-up: Chantel Ménard
- Location: Sibu Island, Johor, Malaysia

Release
- Original network: TF1
- Original release: 24 April – 24 July 2015

Season chronology
- ← Previous; La Nouvelle Édition Next → Thaïlande

Koh-Lanta: Johor is the fourteenth season of the French version of Survivor, Koh-Lanta. This season takes place in Sibu Island, Johor, Malaysia where 20 ordinary people will survive in the wilderness for 40 days. In the end, one will win €100,000 and be crowned Sole Survivor. The main twist this season occurred on day 4 where each tribe had to banish two tribe mates to an island where they will stay indefinitely until further notice. The season premiered on 24 April 2015 and concluded on 24 July 2015 when Marc Rambaud won in a 9-2 jury vote against Chantel Ménard to be crowned Sole Survivor.

== Finishing order ==
Contestant	Original Tribe	Banished Twist	Swapped Tribe	Episode 5 Tribe	Merged Tribe	Finish
Babeth Delettre; 52, Michery	Lankawaï					1st Voted Out; Day 3
Marie-Anne Queniart; 38, Aix-en-Provence	Tinggi	Tinggi				2nd Voted Out; Day 6
Benoît Jorion-Fahy; 27, Lyon	Tinggi	Tinggi	Tinggi			3rd Voted Out; Day 9
Manon Allender; 24, Lambersart	Lankawaï	Banished	Tinggi			Left Competition; Day 12
Isabelle Haouzi; Returned to Game	Lankawaï	Lankawaï	Lankawaï			4th Voted Out; Day 12
Loïc Crespin; 20, Culoz	Lankawaï	Lankawaï	Tinggi			Medically evacuated Day 13
Isabelle Haouzi; 54, Saint-Maur-des-Fossés	Lankawaï	Lankawaï	Lankawaï	Tinggi		5th Voted Out; Day 15
Christophe Pendon; Returned to Game	Lankawaï	Lankawaï	Lankawaï	Lankawaï		6th Voted Out; Day 17
Margot Perrot Houwaer; 22, Le Havre	Tinggi	Tinggi	Lankawaï	Lankawaï		Medically evacuated Day 19
Alban Pellegrin; 28, Charbonnières-les-Bains	Lankawaï	Lankawaï	Tinggi	Tinggi		7th Voted Out; 1st jury member Day 19
Jeff Santiago; Returned to Game	Tinggi	Tinggi	Tinggi	Tinggi	Koh-Lanta	8th Voted Out; Day 20
Corinne Bargoin Samuelian; 45, Toulon	Tinggi	Tinggi	Lankawaï	Lankawaï	Koh-Lanta	Medically evacuated 2nd jury member Day 21
Cédric Giosserand-Lucas; 36, Paris	Tinggi	Banished	Lankawaï	Lankawaï	Koh-Lanta	9th Voted Out; 3rd jury member Day 23
Charlaine Cuny; 21, Lunéville	Lankawaï	Lankawaï	Lankawaï	Lankawaï	Koh-Lanta	10th Voted Out; 4th jury member Day 26
Nessim Kouachi; 26, Villejuif	Tinggi	Tinggi	Lankawaï	Lankawaï	Koh-Lanta	11th Voted Out; 5th jury member Day 26
Jeff Santiago; 32, Marseille	Tinggi	Tinggi	Tinggi	Tinggi	Koh-Lanta	12th Voted Out; 6th jury member Day 29
Christophe Pendon; 30, Dunkirk	Lankawaï	Lankawaï	Lankawaï	Lankawaï	Koh-Lanta	13th Voted Out; 7th jury member Day 32
Jessica Potel; 31, Soisy-sur-Seine	Tinggi	Banished	Tinggi	Tinggi	Koh-Lanta	14th Voted Out; 8th jury member Day 34
Sébastien Ballesteros; 25, Bayonne	Lankawaï	Banished	Lankawaï	Lankawaï	Koh-Lanta	15th Voted Out; 9th jury member Day 37
Bruno Peisey; 52, Le Havre	Tinggi	Tinggi	Tinggi	Tinggi	Koh-Lanta	Lost Challenge; 10th jury member Day 38
Mélissa Bastin; 28, Marseille	Lankawaï	Lankawaï	Tinggi	Tinggi	Koh-Lanta	15th Voted Out; 11th jury member Day 39
Chantel Ménard; 45, Vannes	Tinggi	Tinggi	Tinggi	Tinggi	Koh-Lanta	Runner-up; Day 40
Marc Rambaud; 43, Angers	Lankawaï	Lankawaï	Lankawaï	Lankawaï	Koh-Lanta	Sole Survivor; Day 40

== Future appearances ==
Alban Pellegrin, Cédric Giosserand-Lucas and Chantal Ménard returned for Koh-Lanta: Le Combat des Héros. Jessica Potel returned for Koh-Lanta: L'Île des héros.

== Voting history ==
	Original Tribe	Banished Twist	Swapped Tribe				Episode 5 Tribe				Merged Tribe													
► Episode	1	2	3	4		5		6	7				8			9		10	11	12	13		14	
► Eliminated	Babeth	Marie-Anne	Benoît	Manon	Isabelle	Loïc	Isabelle	Christophe	Margot	Alban	Jeff		Corinne	Cédric		Charlaine	Nessim	Jeff	Christophe	Jessica	Sébastien		Bruno	Mélissa
► Votes	7-2-1	5-3	8-1-1	0 (Note: After being checked & cleared by medical professionals for an injury, Manon chose to leave the game.)	6-2-2	0 (Note: Loïc was medically evacuated from the game.)	5-1-1-~~1~~ (Note: Benoît's black vote against Loïc did not count as the latter was medically evacuated from the game.)	5-2-2	0 (Note: Margot was medically evacuated from the game.)	2 (Note: Two ambassadors (Cédric & Jeff) were chosen by their tribes to have a mutual agreement on who to decide to eliminate. They chose to eliminate Alban. In addition, Christophe returned to the game during the meeting which enabled his safety from elimination.)	6-5-1-~~1~~ (Note: As Christophe returned to the game, his black vote from his elimination was counted alongside his regular vote. In addition, Isabelle's black vote did not count as Alban was already eliminated.)		0 (Note: Corinne was medically evacuated from the game.)	~~6~~-6 (Note: Mélissa played a hidden immunity collar for herself. As a result, 6 votes were cancelled.)		8-1-1-1	0 (Note: As Nessim was Charlaine's partner, he was also eliminated from the game.)	4-2-2-1	6-1-~~1~~ (Note: As Marc won the immunity challenge, the black vote he received from Jeff did not count.)	4-3	3-3 (Note: Bruno played a hidden immunity necklace for himself. However he did not receive any votes, therefore no votes were affected.)	3-2 (Note: Jessica's black vote did not continue into the second round of voting.)	0 (Note: Bruno came last in the final 4 elimination challenge.)	1
▼ Contestants	Votes																							
Marc	Isabelle				Isabelle			Corinne			Jeff			~~Mélissa~~		Charlaine		Jeff	Christophe	Jessica	Sébastien	Sébastien		
Chantal		Marie-Anne	Benoît				Mélissa				Sébastien			Cédric		Charlaine		Jeff	Christophe	Jessica	Sébastien	Sébastien		Mélissa
Mélissa	Babeth		Benoît				Isabelle				Sébastien			Cédric		Charlaine		Marc	Christophe	Chantal	Chantal	Chantal		
Bruno		Marie-Anne	Benoît				Isabelle				Sébastien			Cédric		Charlaine		Jeff	Christophe	Jessica	Sébastien	Sébastien		
Sébastien	Babeth				Isabelle			Corinne			Jeff			~~Mélissa~~		Charlaine		Jeff	Christophe	Jessica	Chantal	Chantal		
Jessica		(Note: Jessica was banished alongside her tribe mate Cédric, as they were banished, she couldn't cast a vote nor be eliminated at her tribe's tribal council.)	Benoît				Isabelle				Sébastien			Cédric		Charlaine		Marc	Christophe	Chantal	Chantal			
Christophe	Babeth				Isabelle			Charlaine	(Note: Christophe returned to the game after Margot was medically evacuated.)		Charlaine	Jeff		~~Mélissa~~		Charlaine		Mélissa	Mélissa	Chantal				
Jeff		Corinne	Benoît				Isabelle			Alban	Sébastien		(Note: Jeff returned to the game after Corrine was medically evacuated.)	Cédric	Cédric	Charlaine		Christophe	~~Marc~~					
Nessim		Marie-Anne			Isabelle			Christophe			Jeff			~~Mélissa~~		Chantal								
Charlaine	Babeth				Christophe			Christophe			Jeff			~~Mélissa~~		Christophe		Christophe						
Cédric		(Note: Cédric & Jessica were banished alongside Manon & Sébastien since day 4, as a result, they missed their tribes tribal council enabling them to be safe from elimination while also unable to cast a vote.)			Isabelle			Christophe		Alban	Jeff			~~Mélissa~~		Mélissa								
Corinne		Marie-Anne			Isabelle			Christophe			(Note: Corrine was put under medical watch & was moved to the infirmary. As a result, she did not go to tribal council which in turn, meant she couldn't cast a vote.)													
Alban	Babeth		Benoît				Isabelle																	
Margot		Marie-Anne			Christophe			Christophe																
Isabelle	Marc				Corinne	(Note: Isabelle returned to the game after Loïc was medically evacuated.)	Jessica	Charlaine			~~Alban~~													
Loïc	Babeth		Benoît																					
Manon	Babeth		Benoît																					
Benoît		Corinne	Loïc				~~Loïc~~																	
Marie-Anne		Corinne			Corinne																			
Babeth	Marc		Manon																					

Jury vote
Episode #	14	
Day #	40	
Finalist	Marc	Chantel
Vote	9-2	
Juror	Vote	
Mélissa	Marc	
Bruno		Chantel
Sébastien	Marc	
Jessica	Marc	
Christophe		Chantel
Jeff	Marc	
Nessim	Marc	
Charlaine	Marc	
Cédric	Marc	
Corinne	Marc	
Alban	Marc	

== Notes ==
A black vote in the voting chart indicates a vote cast by the contestant eliminated that is used for the subsequent tribal council.
