= Koh-Lanta: Thaïlande =

- No. of days: 40
- No. of castaways: 21
- Winner: Wendy Gervois
- Location: Ko Yao, Thailand
- No. of episodes: 14

Release
- Original release: 12 February – 27 May 2016

Season chronology
- ← Previous; Johor Next → L'Île au Trésor

Koh-Lanta: Thaïlande (transl. Koh-Lanta: Thailand) is the 15th season of the French version of Survivor, Koh-Lanta. This season takes place in the Ko Yao District in Thailand where 21 contestants survive for 40 days on a deserted island to try and win €100 000. The main twist this season is that everyone starts off on a single beach for the first day. The next day, the contestants have to decide which two will stay on the island until after the first tribal council. The island later became a place where each tribe had to send one of their members to be exiled, missing the immunity challenge but also tribal council. On the island, there are immunity collars that the contestants can find that they can play at tribal council and have all votes against them removed; sending the person with the second most votes home. The season aired on TF1 from 12 February until 27 May 2016 where Wendy Gervois won against Pascal Salviani in a close 6–5 vote.

== Contestants ==
| Contestant | Original Tribe | Swapped Tribe | Merged Tribe | Finish |
|---|---|---|---|---|
| Charlie Vincent-Mussard; 28, Le Mans | Karwaï | | | Left Competition; Day 3 |
| Laurence Corbellotti; 37, Carry-le-Rouet | Karwaï | | | 1st Voted Out; Day 3 |
| Marius Torterat; 21, Épinal | Aopoh | | | Left Competition; Day 6 |
| Céline Parat-Yeghiayan; 44, Ploemeur | Karwaï | | | 2nd Voted Out; Day 6 |
| Huw Francis; 38, La Roche-sur-Foron | Karwaï | | | 3rd Voted Out; Day 9 |
| Carole Poncelet; 51, Clermont-Ferrand | Aopoh | Aopoh | | 4th Voted Out; Day 12 |
| Laurence "Lolo" Facione; 45, Cergy-Pontoise | Karwaï | Aopoh | | 5th Voted Out; Day 15 |
| Amir Doukhan; 46, Le Pecq | Aopoh | Aopoh | | 6th Voted Out; Day 17 |
| Cassandre Girard; 22, Sèvres | Aopoh | Karwaï | | Lost Duel; 1st jury member Day 19 |
| Romain Palazzetti; 28, Nice | Aopoh | Aopoh | Koh-Lanta | 7th Voted Out; 2nd jury member Day 20 |
| Julien Castro; 29, Béziers | Karwaï | Karwaï | Koh-Lanta | 8th Voted Out; 3rd jury member Day 23 |
| Laureen Hugel; 26, Cannes | Karwaï | Karwaï | Koh-Lanta | 9th Voted Out; 4th jury member Day 26 |
| Steve Best; 33, Saint-Cloud | Karwaï | Aopoh | Koh-Lanta | 10th Voted Out; 5th jury member Day 26 |
| Carine Cazals; 34, Albi | Aopoh | Aopoh | Koh-Lanta | 11th Voted Out; 6th jury member Day 29 |
| Karima Neggaz; 26, Paris | Aopoh | Aopoh | Koh-Lanta | 12th Voted Out; 7th jury member Day 32 |
| Nicolas Rouyé; 32, Jonzac | Aopoh | Karwaï | Koh-Lanta | 13th Voted Out; 8th jury member Day 34 |
| Alain Chrisostome; 56, Gan | Karwaï | Karwaï | Koh-Lanta | 14th Voted Out; 9th jury member Day 37 |
| Cécilia Siharaj; 28, Courbevoie | Aopoh | Karwaï | Koh-Lanta | Lost Challenge; 10th jury member Day 38 |
| Gabriel Gubbels; 40, Namur, Belgium | Aopoh | Karwaï | Koh-Lanta | 15th Voted Out; 11th jury member Day 39 |
| Pascal Salviani; 48, Saint-Laurent-du-Var | Karwaï | Aopoh | Koh-Lanta | Runner-up; Day 40 |
| Wendy Gervois; 26, Fourmies | Karwaï | Karwaï | Koh-Lanta | Sole Survivor; Day 40 |

== Challenges ==
| Episode | Air date | Challenges | | Exiles on the island of necklaces | Eliminated | Vote | Finish |
| Episode | Air date | Reward | Immunity | Exiles on the island of necklaces | Eliminated | Vote | Finish |
|---|---|---|---|---|---|---|---|
| Episode 1 | 12 February 2016 | Aopoh | Aopoh | Cassandre & Steve | Laurence | 7-1 | 1st Voted Out; Day 3 |
| Episode 2 | 19 February 2016 | Aopoh | Aopoh | Gabriel & Huw | Céline | 4-3-1-1 | 2st Voted Out; Day 6 |
| Episode 3 | 26 February 2016 | Aopoh | Aopoh | Karima & Steve | Huw | 5-1-1-1 | 3nd Voted Out; Day 9 |
| Episode 4 | 4 March 2016 | Karwaï | Karwaï | | Carole | 5-2-1-1 | 4nd Voted Out; Day 12 |
| Episode 5 | 18 March 2016 | Karwaï | Karwaï | | Lolo | 3-3-1-1/4-3 | 5th Voted Out; Day 15 |
| Episode 6 | 1 April 2016 | Aopoh | Karwaï | | Amir | 6-1 | 6th Voted Out; Day 17 |
| Episode 7 | 8 April 2016 | Aopoh | Carine | | Romain | 8-4-1 | Eliminated; 1st jury member Day 20 |
| Episode 8 | 15 April 2026 | Pascal | Karima | Pascal | Julien | 6-3-1-1 | 5th Voted Out; 2nd jury member Day 23 |
| Episode 9 | 22 April 2016 | Gabriel & Wendy | Cécilia & Nicolas | | Laureen & Steve | 7-3-1 | 6th Voted Out; 3rd jury member Day 26 |
| Episode 10 | 29 April 2016 | Karima et Nicolas | Karima | | Carine | 6-2-1 | 7th Voted Out; 4nd jury member Day 29 |
| Episode 11 | 6 May 2016 | Nicolas | Nicolas | | Karima | 6-1-1 | 8th Voted Out; 4nd jury member Day 32 |
| Episode 12 | 13 May 2016 | Nicolas | Alain | Nicolas | Nicolas | 4-2-1 | 9th Voted Out; 4nd jury member Day 34 |
| Episode 13 | 20 May 2016 | Gabriel | Wendy | | Alain | 4-1-1 | 10th Voted Out; 4nd jury member Day 37 |
| | | Orienteering Challenge | Poles Challenge | Final Council | | | |
| Episode 14 | 27 May 2016 | Gabriel Pascal Wendy | Pascal | | Wendy | 5-4 | Winner |

== Voting history ==
| # | Original Tribe | | | | | | | | | | | | | | | | | | | | | |
|---|---|---|---|---|---|---|---|---|---|---|---|---|---|---|---|---|---|---|---|---|---|---|
| Episode | 1 | | 2 | 3 | 4 | 5 | | 6 | | 7 | | 8 | 9 | | 10 | 11 | 12 | 12 | 13 | | finalist | winner |
| Eliminated | Charlie | Laurence | Marius | Céline | Huw | Carole | Lolo | | Amir | Cassandre | Romain | Julien | Laureen | Steve | Carine | Karima | Nicolas | Alain | Cécilia | Gabriel | Pascal | Wendy |
| Votes | 0 (Note: A Charlie is taken to the doctor because of a headache. He allows her to return to the game, which she refuses.) | 7-8 | 0 (Note: Marius, no longer having the motivation to go all the way with the adventure, decides to give up.) | 4-9 | 5-8 | 5-9 | equality | 4-7 | 6-7 | 0 (Note: As the two ambassadors Cassandre and Romain could not reach an agreement, a draw was carried out and Cassandre was eliminated) | 8-13 (Note: During this council, Karima uses an immunity necklace, canceling only one vote against her.) | 6-12 | 6-11 (Note: During this council, Pascal uses an immunity necklace, canceling out one vote against him.) | | 6-9 | 6-8 | 6-7 | 4-6 | 0 (Note: Cecilia comes in last in the orientation challenge and is eliminated.) | 0 | 5-11 | 6-11 |
| Wendy | | Laurence | | Céline | Huw | | | | | | Romain | Julien | Laureen | | Carine | Karima | Nicolas | Alain | | | Jury final | |
| Pascal | | Laurence | | Lolo | Huw | Carole | ~~Amir~~ | Amir | Amir | | ~~Karima~~ | Julien | Alain | | Carine | Karima | Nicolas | Alain | | Gabriel | Jury final | |
| Gabriel | | | (Note: From day 4 to 7, Gabriel is sent to the island of necklaces.) | | | | | | | | Romain | Julien | Laureen | | Carine | Karima | Nicolas | Alain | | | | Wendy |
| Cécilia | | | | | | | | | | | Romain | Pacal | Laureen | | Carine | Karima | Pascal | Alain | | | | Wendy |
| Alain | | Laurence | | Lolo | Huw | | | | | | Romain | Julien | Laureen | | Carine | Karima | Nicolas | Cécilia | | | Pascal | |
| Nicolas | | | | | | | | | | | Romain | Pascal | Laureen | | Carine | Karima | Pascal | ~~Wendy~~ | | | Pascal | |
| Karima | | | | (Note: From day 7 to 10, Karima is sent to the island of necklaces.) | | Carole | ~~Lolo~~ | Lolo | Amir | | Cécilia | Pascal | ~~Pascal~~ | | Pascal | Gabriel | Gabriel | | | | Pascal | |
| Carine | | | | | | Carole | ~~Lolo~~ | Lolo | Amir | | Cécilia | Julien | Alain | | Pascal | Pascal | | | | | | Wendy |
| Steeve | (Note: Steve volunteers to go to Necklace Island from day 1 to 4.) | | | Céline | (Note: From day 7 to 10, Steve is sent back to the island with the necklaces.) | Carole | ~~Amir~~ | Amir | Amir | | Cécilia | Julien | Alain | | | | | | | | Pascal | |
| Laureen | (Note: Following Charlie's withdrawal, Laureen joins the adventure at the council on day 3 to replace her.) | Carole | | Céline | Huw | | | | | | Romain | Julien | Alain | | Gabriel | | | | | | | Wendy |
| Julien | | Laurence | | Lolo | Pascal | | | | | | Romain | Carine | Laureen | | | | | | | | | Wendy |
| Romain | | | | | | Carole | ~~Lolo~~ | Lolo | Amir | | Cécilia | ~~Karima~~ | | | | | | | | | Pascal | |
| Cassandre | (Note: Cassandre volunteers to go to the island of necklaces from day 1 to 4.) | | | | | | | | | | | | | | | | | | | | | Wendy |
| Amir | | | | | | Pascal | ~~Pascal~~ | Lolo | Romain | | Romain | | | | | | | | | | | |
| Lolo | | Laurence | | Céline | Huw | Carole | ~~Amir~~ | Amir | ~~Romain~~ | | | | | | | | | | | | | |
| Carole | | | | | Steve | ~~Romain~~ | | | | | | | | | | | | | | | | |
| Huw | | Laurence | (Note: From day 4 to 7, Huw is sent to the island of necklaces.) | | Lolo | Lolo | | | | | | | | | | | | | | | | |
| Céline | | | Laurence | Laureen | Laureen | | | | | | | | | | | | | | | | | |
| Marius | | | | | | | | | | | | | | | | | | | | | | |
| Laurence | | Céline | | Julien | | | | | | | | | | | | | | | | | | |
| Charlie | | | | | | | | | | | | | | | | | | | | | | |

== Future appearances ==
Cassandre Girard and Pascal Salviani later returned to compete in Koh-Lanta: Le Combat des Héros. Karima Neggaz returned for Koh-Lanta: La Légende.

== Challenges ==
| Air date | Challenge | | Exiled | Eliminated | Vote | Finish |
| Air date | Reward | Immunity | Exiled | Eliminated | Vote | Finish |
|---|---|---|---|---|---|---|
| 12 February 2016 | Aopoh | Aopoh | Steve; Cassandre | Charlie | 0 | Left Competition; Day 3 |
| 12 February 2016 | Aopoh | Aopoh | Steve; Cassandre | Laurence | 7-1 | 1st Voted Out; Day 3 |
| 19 February 2016 | Aopoh | Aopoh | Gabriel | Marius | 0 | Left Competition; Day 6 |
| 19 February 2016 | Aopoh | Aopoh | Huw | Céline | 4-3-1-1 | 2nd Voted Out; Day 6 |
