= Remiremont =

- Commune
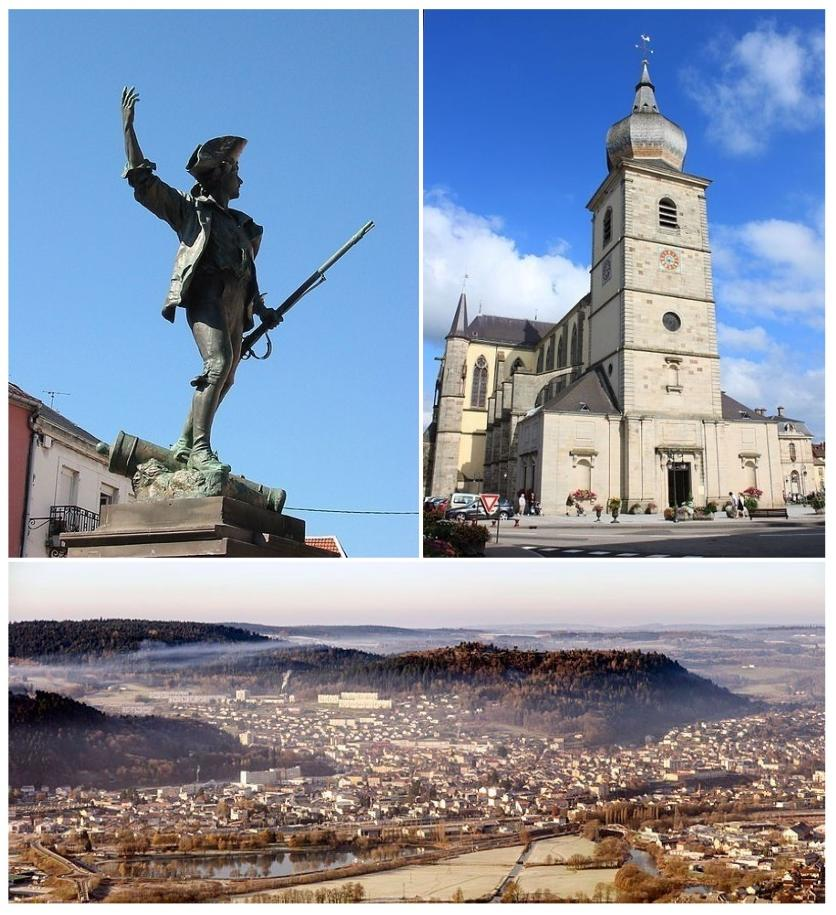
- Clockwise from top-left: Statue of the Volunteer of 1792, Remiremont Abbey, a panorama of Remiremont seen from Saint-Mont

- Flag Coat of arms
- Location of Remiremont
- Location within France Location within Grand Est
- Coordinates: 48°01′03″N 6°35′26″E
- Country: France
- Region: Grand Est
- Department: Vosges
- Arrondissement: Épinal
- Canton: Remiremont
- Intercommunality: CC Porte des Vosges Méridionales

Government
  - Mayor (2020–2026): Jean-Benoît Tisserand
- Area^{1}: 18 km^{2} (6.9 sq mi)
- Elevation: 400 m (1,300 ft)
- Highest elevation: 762 m (2,500 ft)
- Lowest elevation: 379 m (1,243 ft)
- Population (2023): 7,388
  - Density: 410/km^{2} (1,100/sq mi)
- Time zone: UTC+01:00 (CET)
  - Summer (DST): UTC+02:00 (CEST)
- INSEE/Postal code: 88383 /88200
- ^{1} French Land Register data, which excludes lakes, ponds, glaciers > 1 km^{2} (0.386 sq mi or 247 acres) and river estuaries.

Remiremont (French pronunciation: [ʁəmiʁmɔ̃]) is a town and commune in the Vosges department, northeastern France, situated in southern Grand Est. The town has been an abbatial centre since the 7th century, is an economic crossroads of the Moselle and Moselotte valleys, and is also a stepping stone for tourists wishing to explore the Vosges and neighbouring Alsace. Remiremont is also known as La Belle des Vosges.

== Geography ==
Remiremont is located on the river Moselle, close to its confluence with the Moselotte and in the foothills of the Vosges mountains. The town is 25 km (16 mi) southeast of the departmental capital of Épinal, 95 km (59 mi) south of Nancy, and 27 km (17 mi) west of the ski resorts of Gérardmer and La Bresse. Remiremont is surrounded by low, undulating, forest-clad mountains. The town is connected with bigger cities by the E23 or N57, the E23 begins from Metz and goes to Lausanne in Switzerland, and goes through several big cities like Metz, Nancy, Épinal, Vesoul, and Besançon. The N57 starts from Nancy and follows the E23 and goes through Charmes, Remiremont, Luxeuil-les-Bains, Vesoul, Besançon, and Pontarlier and stops on the Swiss border. Remiremont station has rail connections to Épinal, Paris and Nancy.

Remiremont is situated along the GR footpath 7 (French: Grande Randonnée 7), a long-distance footpath which follows a part of the European continental divide between the Mediterranean to the south and the North Sea/English Channel/Atlantic to the north.

== Notable landmarks ==
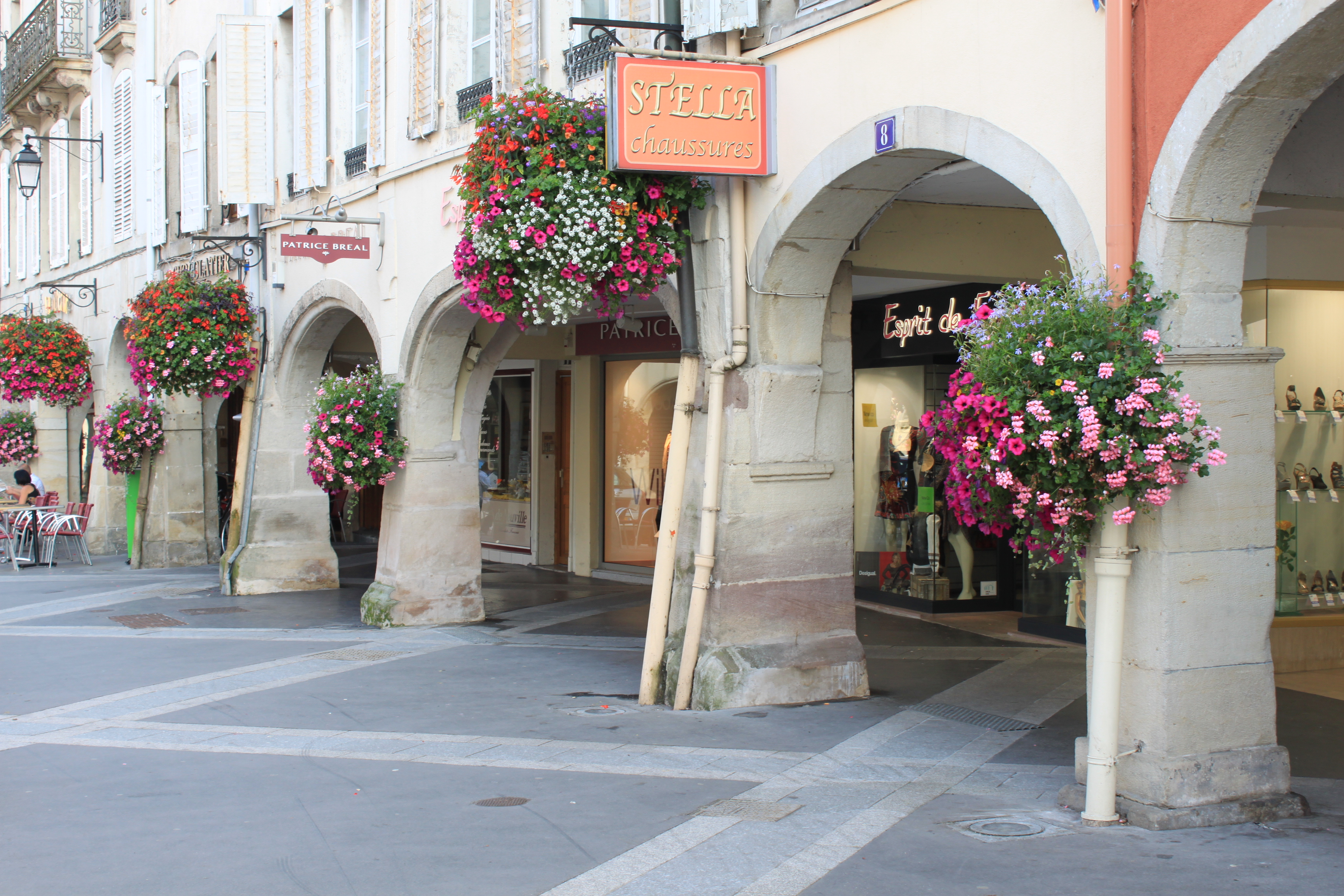
Rue Charles de Gaulle

The abbey contains an eleventh-century crypt in which the tombs of some of the former abbesses can be found. The church was consecrated in 1051, but the building as a whole belongs more to the late thirteenth century. The abbatial residence (which now contains the town hall and court house) has been twice rebuilt in modern times (once in 1750, and again after a fire in 1871), but the original plan and style have been preserved: the imposing front, the vestibule, and the grand staircase. Some of the houses of the canonesses dating from the 17th and 18th centuries also remain.

Remiremont is home to the 'Statue of the Volunteer of 1792', created by the sculptor Paul-François Choppin in 1899. The statue commemorates the civic virtue of those who volunteered to defend France during the Revolutionary Wars. It is the only one remaining of the two originals produced; the other, located on Parmentier Square in Paris, was melted down by the German occupiers in 1942.

The town's principal shopping street is rue Charles de Gaulle. This street is lined by 18th-century arcades, providing a sheltered walkway for visiting the local boutiques and cafés. It is at the westernmost end of this street that the aforementioned statue can be found.

== History ==
=== Abbey ===
Remiremont (from the Latin Romarici Mons) derives its name from Saint Romaric, one of the companions of Saint Columban of Luxeuil, who in the seventh century founded two communities in the area. The first was Remiremont Abbey, in the valley, which housed the monks. The second was a convent located above the town on the hill now known as Saint-Mont (a chapel, dating from 1730, can still be visited on the site). Many of the nuns' names, and those of their patrons, are preserved in the convent's Liber Memorialis.

Over time, the nuns moved from the upper site down into Remiremont itself and established themselves as a Benedictine convent. By the end of the 13th century, however, the nuns had abandoned their Benedictine lifestyle and become a community of secular canonesses. Their members were extracted solely from those who could prove at least 200 years of noble descent.

Thanks to the patronage of the Dukes of Lorraine, the Kings of France, and Holy Roman Emperors, the ladies of Remiremont attained considerable power. The abbess of Remiremont Abbey was raised to the status of Imperial Princess and consecrated by the Pope.

=== Within France ===
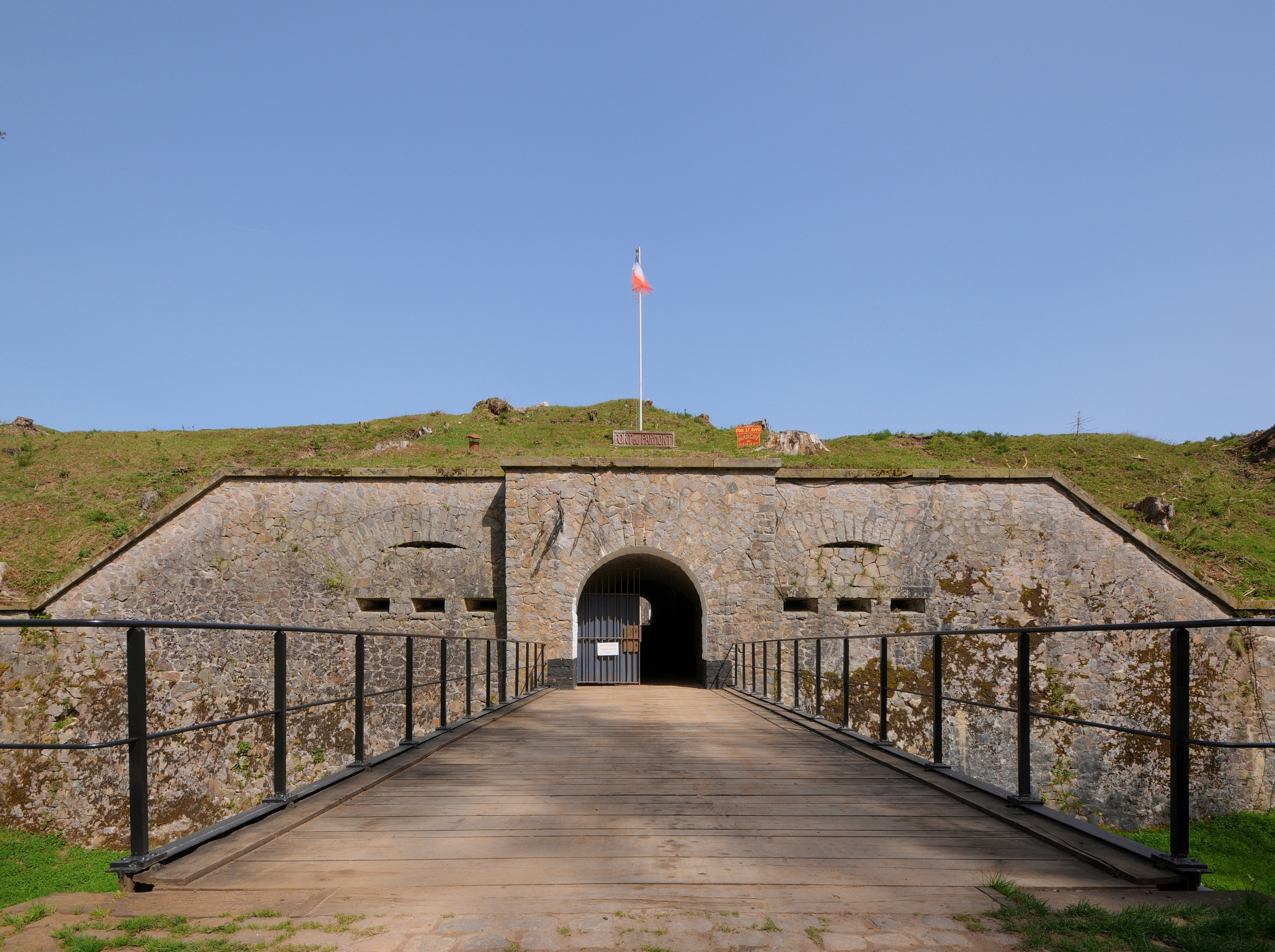
Fort du Parmont

In 1635, during the Thirty Years' War the town, where five-hundred Frenchmen were lodged, was stormed and plundered by Imperialist forces. The town was attacked by the French in 1638. However, under the guidance of the canonesses, the inhabitants managed to repel the siege. The town was later ruined by the earthquake of 1682. Along with the rest of Lorraine, it was annexed by France in 1766 (at which point the Abbey lost its status of Imperial Immediacy). The church properties in the town were suppressed during the French Revolution.

Following the end of the Franco-Prussian War in 1871, a defensive fort was built above the town, named fort du Parmont. This fort fell into German hands on 18 June 1940 as part of the Second World War, and was later used until 1960 as a munitions store by the US Army.

== Population ==
Its inhabitants are known as Romarimontains in French.

Historical population
Year	Pop.	±% p.a.
1968	9,312	—
1975	10,552	+1.80%
1982	9,985	−0.79%
1990	9,068	−1.20%
1999	8,538	−0.67%
2007	8,104	−0.65%
2012	7,766	−0.85%
2017	7,714	−0.13%
2023	7,388	−0.72%
Source: INSEE

== Notable people ==
- Julien Absalon, cross-country mountain biker
- René Aubry, composer
- Fernand Bachmann (1886–1965). racing driver
- Nabil Baha, footballer
- Emmanuelle Riva (1927–2017), actress
- Jules Méline, statesman and former Prime Minister, 1896-1898
- Odile Schweisguth, pioneer of Pediatric oncology
- Nicolas Janny (1749–1822), priest, pedagogue and grammarian, born in Metz, died in Remiremont
- Georges Picard (1857-1943), decorative artist and illustrator

== See also ==
- Communes of the Vosges department
