= International Society of Paediatric Oncology =

Medical association

The International Society of Pediatric Oncology (SIOP) (French: Société internationale d'oncologie pédiatrique) is a medical association for pediatric oncologists that is dedicated to increasing knowledge about childhood cancer. Its first president was Odile Schweisguth of France.

It is an organisation with a strong global presence and over 1000 members around the world. These members include physicians, nurses, researchers, scientists, public health specialists and other health care professionals.

== Membership ==
The society invites membership applications from all health and science professionals who are interested in eh clinical, laboratory, epidemiological and/or other research applications in the field of childhood cancer.

== Journal ==
Pediatric Blood and Cancer is the official journal of SIOP. It provides broad coverage of basic and clinical research advances in the management of children with cancer.

There are also many other educational resources available on the SIOP website.

== SIOP Advocacy ==
Advocacy is fundamental to the vision of the International Society of Pediatric Oncology. It has a critical role in contributing towards the global reduction of infant and child mortality due to cancers by:

- Leading the campaign to raise awareness and build a global momentum mobilizing communities worldwide;
- Making childhood cancer better understood by the general public;
- Educating and influencing key opinion leaders to address childhood cancer in their communities;
- Educating legislators to enact appropriate policies that could benefit childhood cancer communities;
- Advocating for appropriate long term follow-up for survivors;
- Documenting ‘Best Practices" in childhood cancer treatment, care and support;
- Raising awareness to the need for appropriate access to care and essential medications;

SIOP's major advocacy endeavors are driven by the Advocacy Task Force. This Task Force consists of an active group of SIOP leaders, who represent the different regions where the society has members and are committed to promoting SIOP's mission that "no child should die of cancer". Their work is directly aligned with the United Nations Millennium Development Goal "to reduce by two-thirds, between 1990 and 2015, the under-five mortality rate."

Previous and current advocacy activities of SIOP include, but are not limited to;

- The International Childhood Cancer Day: a global campaign to promote awareness of childhood cancer and express support to children with cancer, and their families. It is run by SIOP in partnership with other networks, societies and organizations around the world. It is held annually on February 15.
- The Signs and Symptoms Campaign. This campaign is in partnership with Childhood Cancer International and the Union for International Cancer Control. Initial materials created for the campaign include a poster with common signs and symptoms and a pocket card with common differential diagnoses. These materials help health workers, especially at the community level, and have been translated into many languages and distributed in over 40 countries.
- My Child Matters Pediatric Oncology Nurse Award: a campaign to give recognition to the important role that nurses play in the fight against childhood cancer. All qualified nurses can apply by designing a project to help fight against childhood cancer and improve the care of children with cancer, particularly in the most disadvantaged areas of the world, and submitting it to be funded.

== SIOP Annual Congress ==
SIOP congresses are high-level meeting involving many disciplines and topics related to pediatric, adolescent and young adult oncology. These include topics in business, education and science. They are held in the fall annually, in rotating worldwide locations.

Congresses have been held at the following locations:

- 2011 – Auckland, New Zealand
- 2012 – London, United Kingdom
- 2013 – Hong Kong, China
- 2014 – Toronto, Canada
- 2015 – Cape Town, South Africa
- 2016 – Dublin, Ireland
- 2017 – Washington, D.C.
- 2018 - Kyoto, Japan
- 2019 - Lyon, France
- 2020 - Virtual
- 2021 - Virtual
- 2022 - Barcelona, Spain
- 2023 - Ottawa, Canada
- 2024 - Honolulu, Hawaii
- 2025 - Amsterdam, the Netherlands
- 2026 - San Antonio, USA
- 2027 - Sydney, Australia

== SIOP prizes and awards ==
SIOP has several prizes and awards that are granted to members in relation to the annual congress.

== History ==
The European branch of SIOP, became an independent organisation (the European Society for Paediatric Oncology) with a permanent office in Brussels (Belgium) in 2007.

== See also ==
- Pediatric oncology
