= Koh-Lanta: Cambodge =

- Presented by: Denis Brogniart
- No. of days: 40
- No. of castaways: 21
- Winner: Frédéric Blancher
- Runner-up: Clémentine Jullien
- Location: Koh Rong, Cambodia
- No. of episodes: 14

Release
- Original release: 10 March – 16 June 2017

Season chronology
- ← Previous; L'Île au Trésor Next → Fidji

Koh-Lanta: Cambodge (transl. Koh-Lanta: Cambodia) is the 17th season of the French version of Survivor, Koh-Lanta. This season takes place in Koh Rong, Cambodia in the same location in which the previous season, Koh-Lanta: L'Île au Trésor was filmed. The main twist this season is instead of having the two traditional tribes, there are three in this season. In addition on day 4, three contestants were added to the game; one for each tribe. The season premiered on 10 March 2017 & concluded on 16 June 2017 where Frédéric Blancher won in a 6-2 jury vote against Clémentine Jullien to be crowned the Sole Survivor.

== Contestants ==
Contestant	Original Tribe	Episode 2 Tribe	Swapped Tribe	Episode 7 Tribe	Merged Tribe	Finish
Dylan Thiry; 22, Luxembourg City, Luxembourg	Takeo					1st Voted Out; Day 3
Sabine Ollivier; 53, Tourcoing	Sokka	Sokka				2nd Voted Out; Day 6
Hada Ghoulam; 31, Antibes	Takeo	Takeo				3rd Voted Out; Day 9
Franck Schlienger; 50, Sélestat	Bokor	Bokor	Bokor			4th Voted Out; Day 12
Félicie Greugny; 27, Paris	Sokka	Sokka	Takeo			5th Voted Out; Day 15
Brahma Sadeyen; 26, Cergy-Pontoise	Sokka	Sokka	Takeo			Left Competition; Day 16
Kelly Beaugrand; Returned to Game	Takeo	Takeo	Takeo			6th Voted Out; Day 18
Bastien Muñez; 23, Marseille	Bokor	Bokor	Bokor			Medically evacuated Day 18
Maria Beccaris; 29, Marseille	Sokka	Sokka	Bokor			Lost Challenge; Day 19
Yves Rey; 49, Frontignan	Takeo	Takeo	Takeo	Takeo		7th Voted Out; Day 20
Yassin Metiri; 39, Bordeaux	Bokor	Bokor	Bokor	Bokor		8th Voted Out; Day 22
Vincent Roux; Returned to Game		Sokka	Takeo	Takeo	Koh-Lanta	9th Voted Out; Day 23
Manuella Baudet; 35, Thiais	Bokor	Bokor	Bokor	Bokor	Koh-Lanta	Medically evacuated Day 25
Sandro Gonzalez Schena; 31, Lasne, Belgium	Sokka	Sokka	Bokor	Bokor	Koh-Lanta	10th Voted Out; 1st jury member Day 26
Marjorie Rousseeuw; 42, Dunkirk	Bokor	Bokor	Bokor	Bokor	Koh-Lanta	11th Voted Out; 2nd jury member Day 29
Corentin Albertini; 23, L'Isle-Jourdain	Sokka	Sokka	Takeo	Takeo	Koh-Lanta	12th Voted Out; 3rd jury member Day 32
Kelly Beaugrand; 35, Paris	Takeo	Takeo	Takeo	Bokor	Koh-Lanta	13th Voted Out; 4th jury member Day 32
Claire Pradayrol; 38, Prudhomat		Takeo	Takeo	Takeo	Koh-Lanta	13th Voted Out; 5th jury member Day 35
Sébastien Gottiniaux; 35, Montmartin-sur-Mer		Bokor	Bokor	Bokor	Koh-Lanta	14th Voted Out; 6th jury member Day 38
Mathilde Chevalier; 21, Angers	Takeo	Takeo	Takeo	Takeo	Koh-Lanta	Lost Challenge; 7th jury member Day 39
Vincent Roux; 32, La Rochelle		Sokka	Takeo	Takeo	Koh-Lanta	15th Voted Out; 8th jury member Day 40
Clémentine Jullien; 25, Annecy	Bokor	Bokor	Bokor	Bokor	Koh-Lanta	Runner-Up; Day 40
Frédéric Blancher; 40, Les Pennes-Mirabeau	Takeo	Takeo	Takeo	Takeo	Koh-Lanta	Sole Survivor; Day 40

== Future appearances ==
Clémentine Jullien, Dylan Thiry and Yassin Metiri later returned for Koh-Lanta: Le Combat des Héros. Clémentine returned for a third time for Koh-Lanta: La Légende, and for a fourth time for Koh-Lanta: All Stars alongside Yassin.

== Challenges ==
Air date	Challenge		Eliminated	Vote	Finish
Air date	Reward	Immunity	Eliminated	Vote	Finish
10 March 2017	Bokor	Sokka	Dylan	5-1	1st Voted Out; Day 3
10 March 2017	Bokor	Bokor	Dylan	5-1	1st Voted Out; Day 3
17 March 2017	Bokor	Bokor	Sabine	6-1	2nd Voted Out; Day 6
17 March 2017	Bokor	Takeo	Sabine	6-1	2nd Voted Out; Day 6
24 March 2017	Sokka	Sokka	Hada	4-2	3rd Voted Out; Day 9
24 March 2017	Sokka	Bokor	Hada	4-2	3rd Voted Out; Day 9
31 March 2017	Takeo	Takeo	Franck	5-4	4th Voted Out; Day 12
7 April 2017	Bokor	Bokor	Félicie	5-2-2	5th Voted Out; Day 15
14 April 2017	Bokor	Bokor	Brahma	0	Left Competition; Day 16
14 April 2017	Bokor	Bokor	Kelly	5-1-1	6th Voted Out; Day 17
21 April 2017	Takeo	Bokor	Bastien	0	Medically evacuated Day 18
21 April 2017	Takeo	Bokor	Maria	0	Lost Challenge; Day 19
21 April 2017	Takeo	Bokor	Yves	5-1	7th Voted Out; Day 20
28 April 2017	Takeo	Sébastien	Yassin	0	8th Voted Out; Day 22
28 April 2017	Takeo	Sébastien	Vincent	6-5	9th Voted Out; Day 23
5 May 2017	Claire & Sandro	Vincent	Manuella	0	Medically evacuated Day 25
5 May 2017	Claire & Sandro	Vincent	Sandro	6-4-1	10th Voted Out; 1st Jury Member; Day 26
12 May 2017	Vincent	Claire	Marjorie	8-2-1	11th Voted Out; 2nd Jury Member; Day 29
19 May 2017	Claire & Sébastien	Claire & Sébastien	Corentin & Kelly	4-3-1-1	12th Voted Out 3rd Jury Member; 13th Voted Out 4th Jury Member Day 32
26 May 2017	Sébastien	Clémentine	Claire	~~5~~-2	14th Voted Out; 5th Jury Member; Day 35
2 June 2017	Frédéric	Mathilde	Sébastien	4-1-~~1~~	15th Voted Out; 6th Jury Member; Day 38
16 June 2017	None	None	Mathilde	0	Lost Challenge; 7th Jury Member; Day 39
16 June 2017	None	None	Vincent	1	16th Voted Out; 8th Jury Member; Day 40
16 June 2017	None	None			Jury vote
16 June 2017	None	None	Clémentine	2/8 votes	Runner-up
16 June 2017	None	None	Frédéric	6/8 votes	Sole Survivor

== Voting History ==
	Starting Tribe	Episode 2 Tribe		Swapped Tribe						Episode 7 Tribe		Merged Tribe											
► Episode	1	2	3	4	5	6		7			8		9		10	11		12	13	14		Runner-Up	Winner
► Eliminated	Dylan	Sabine	Hada	Franck	Félicie	Brahma	Kelly	Bastien	Maria	Yves	Yassin	Vincent	Manuella	Sandro	Marjorie	Corentin	Kelly	Claire	Sébastien	Mathilde	Vincent	Clémentine	Frédéric
► Votes	5/6	6/7	4/6	5/9	5/9	0 (Note: Brahma decided to leave the competition.)	5/7	0 (Note: As a result of an injury to his knee, Bastien was medically evacuated from the game.)	0 (Note: As Maria finished last in the challenge, she was eliminated from the game.)	5/6	2 (Note: The two ambassadors Mathilde and Sandro had to choose to eliminate a contestant before the merge, they chose Yassin.)	6/11	0 (Note: Manuella was medically evacuated from the game.)	6/11	8/11	4/9	0 (Note: As this tribal council was with pairs, Kelly was eliminated as her partner, Corentin received the most votes.)	2/7 (Note: Mathilde played a hidden immunity idol, therefore 5 votes against her did not count.)	4/6 (Note: Clémentine played a hidden immunity idol, therefore 1 vote against her did not count.)	0 (Note: As Mathilde finished last in the challenge, she was eliminated from the game.)	1	2/8	6/8
▼ Contestants	Votes																						
Frédéric	Dylan		Hada		Kelly		Kelly			Yves		Kelly		Sandro	Marjorie	Kelly		~~Mathilde~~	Sébastien			Jury final	
Clémentine				Franck								Vincent		Sandro	Marjorie	Corentin		Claire	Sébastien		Vincent	Jury final	
Vincent		Sabine			Brahma		Kelly			Yves		Kelly		Sandro	Marjorie	Kelly		~~Mathilde~~	~~Clémentine~~				Frédéric
Mathilde	Dylan		Hada		Félicie		Claire			Yves	Yassin	Kelly		Sandro	Marjorie	Corentin		Claire	Sébastien			Clémentine	
Sébastien				Franck								Vincent		Marjorie	Marjorie	Corentin		~~Mathilde~~	Frédéric				Frédéric
Claire			Hada		Félicie		Kelly			Yves		Kelly		Marjorie	Marjorie	Kelly		~~Mathilde~~					Frédéric
Kelly	Dylan		Yves		Félicie		Yves					Vincent		Sandro	Marjorie	Frédéric						Clémentine	
Corentin		Sabine			Kelly		Kelly			Yves		Kelly		Marjorie	Marjorie	Mathilde							Frédéric
Marjorie				Maria								Vincent		Claire	Corentin								Frédéric
Sandro		Sabine		Franck							Yassin	Vincent		Marjorie									Frédéric
Manuella				Maria								Vincent											
Yassin				Maria																			
Yves	Dylan		Hada		Félicie		Kelly			Mathilde													
Maria		Sabine		Franck																			
Bastien				Franck																			
Brahma		Sabine			Félicie																		
Félicie		Sabine			Brahma																		
Franck				Maria																			
Hada	Dylan		Yves																				
Sabine		Maria																					
Dylan	Yves																						
Black Vote														Sandro (Note: As Vincent was the last eliminated, he got to choose someone to cast an additional vote, he chose Corentin.)	Corentin (Note: As Sandro was the last eliminated, he got to choose someone to cast a second vote, he chose Marjorie.)	Corentin (Note: As Marjorie was the last eliminated, she got to choose someone to cast a second vote, she chose Clémentine.)		~~Mathilde~~ (Note: As Corentin was the last eliminated, he got to choose someone to cast a second vote, he chose Vincent.)	Sébastien (Note: As Claire was the last eliminated, she got to choose someone to cast a second vote, she chose Clémentine.)				
