= Les Côtes-d'Arey =

- Commune
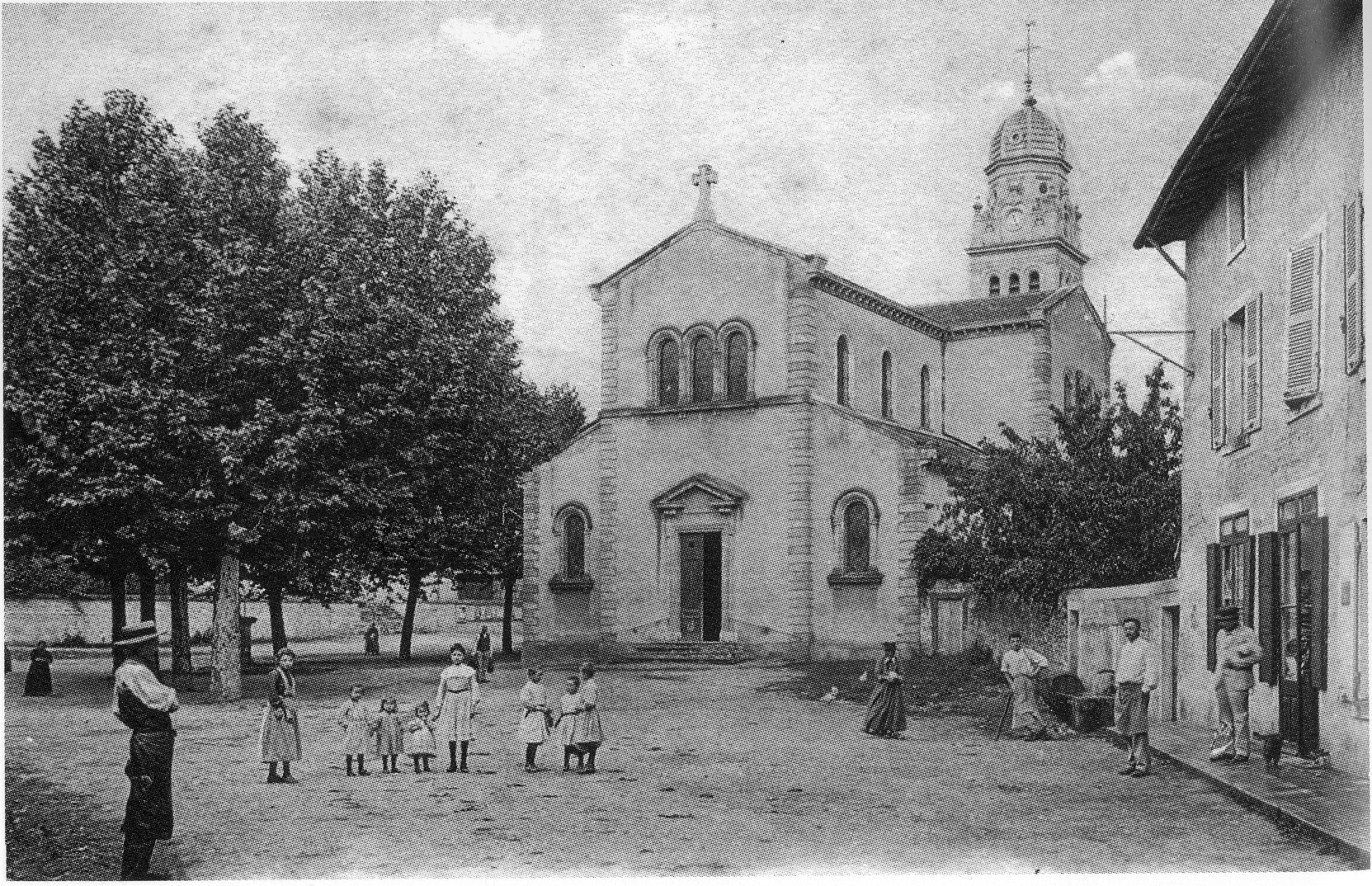
- Les Côtes-d'Arey in 1910
- Location of Les Côtes-d'Arey
- Location within France Location within Auvergne-Rhône-Alpes
- Coordinates: 45°27′24″N 4°52′04″E
- Country: France
- Region: Auvergne-Rhône-Alpes
- Department: Isère
- Arrondissement: Vienne
- Canton: Vienne-2
- Intercommunality: CA Vienne Condrieu

Government
  - Mayor (2020–2026): Christian Borel
- Area^{1}: 24.31 km^{2} (9.39 sq mi)
- Highest elevation: 409 m (1,342 ft)
- Lowest elevation: 217 m (712 ft)
- Population (2023): 2,023
  - Density: 83.22/km^{2} (215.5/sq mi)
- Time zone: UTC+01:00 (CET)
  - Summer (DST): UTC+02:00 (CEST)
- INSEE/Postal code: 38131 /38138
- ^{1} French Land Register data, which excludes lakes, ponds, glaciers > 1 km^{2} (0.386 sq mi or 247 acres) and river estuaries.

Les Côtes-d'Arey (French pronunciation: [le kot daʁɛ]) is a commune in the Isère department in southeastern France.

== Population ==
Historical population

Year	Pop.	±% p.a.
1793	725	—
1800	818	+1.74%
1806	933	+2.22%
1821	1,094	+1.07%
1831	1,129	+0.32%
1836	1,228	+1.70%
1841	1,207	−0.34%
1846	1,240	+0.54%
1851	1,217	−0.37%
1856	1,122	−1.61%
1861	1,127	+0.09%
1866	1,110	−0.30%
1872	1,084	−0.39%
1876	1,099	+0.34%
1881	981	−2.25%
1886	986	+0.10%
1891	985	−0.02%
1896	930	−1.14%
1901	890	−0.88%

Year	Pop.	±% p.a.
1906	875	−0.34%
1911	865	−0.23%
1921	775	−1.09%
1926	799	+0.61%
1931	765	−0.87%
1936	715	−1.34%
1946	730	+0.21%
1954	699	−0.54%
1962	632	−1.25%
1968	639	+0.18%
1975	709	+1.50%
1982	1,059	+5.90%
1990	1,214	+1.72%
1999	1,551	+2.76%
2007	1,754	+1.55%
2012	1,958	+2.22%
2017	2,026	+0.69%
2023	2,023	−0.02%

Source: EHESS and INSEE (1968-2023)

== See also ==
- Communes of the Isère department
