= Siege of Lyon =

1793 siege of the War of the First Coalition

- Part of the Federalist revolts during the War of the First Coalition
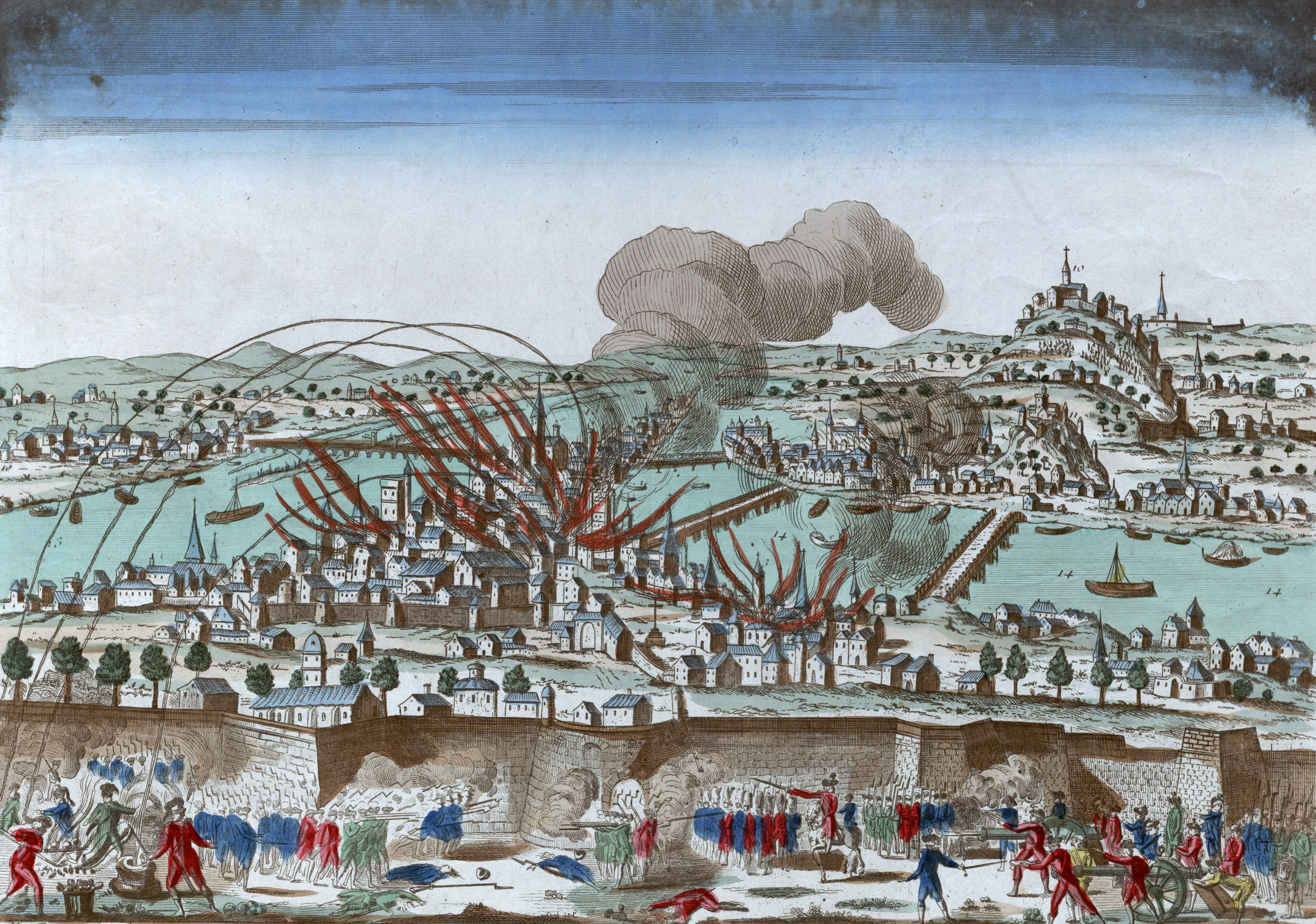
- Revolt of Lyon against the National Convention
Date	9 August – 9 October 1793
Location	Lyon, France 45°45′27″N 4°49′57″E
Result	French Republican victory

Belligerents
(French First Republic) French Republic	(Kingdom of France) French royalists

Commanders and leaders
Dubois-Crancé	Louis François Perrin de Précy

Strength
35,000	c. 20,000

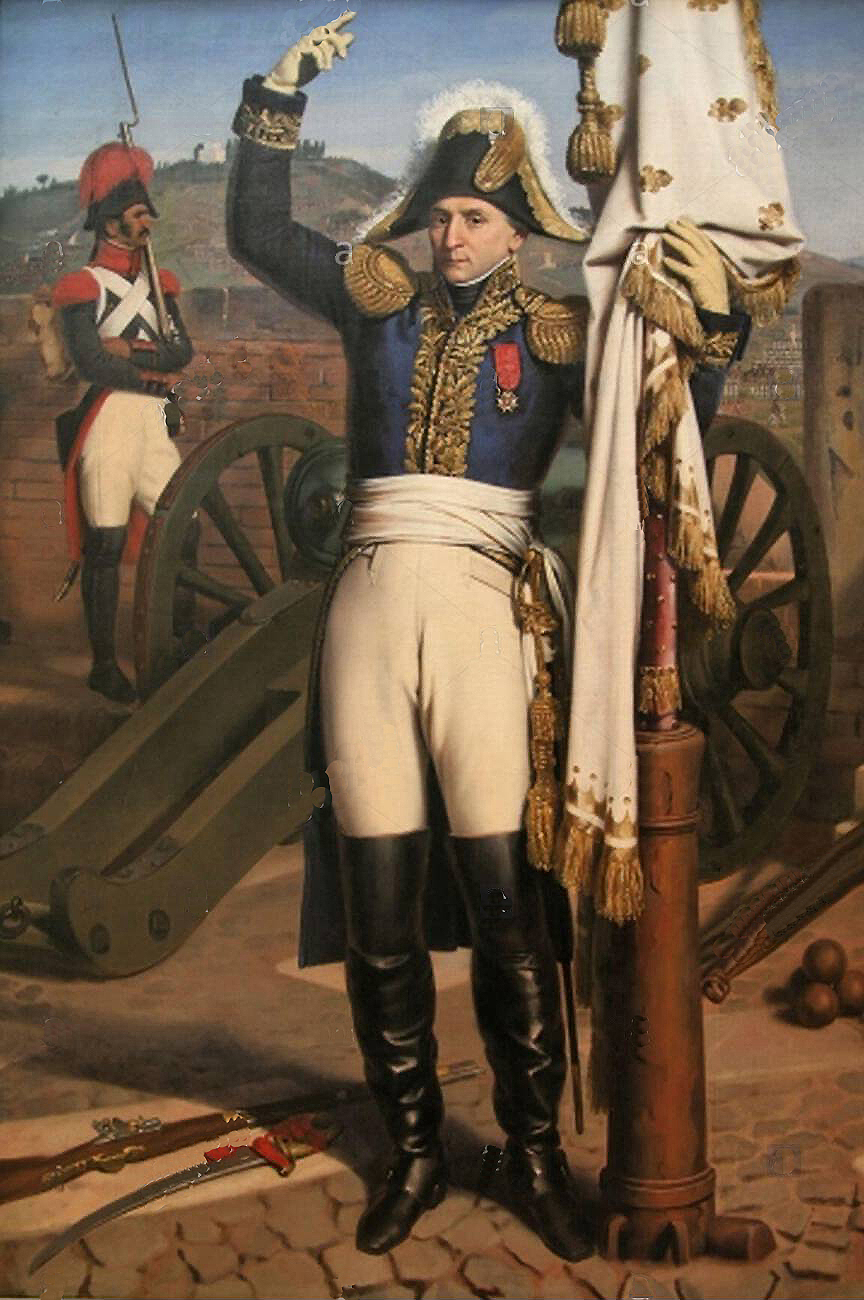
Louis François Perrin de Précy, leader of the Lyon insurgents, painted by Jean-Joseph Dassy.

The siege of Lyon occurred on 9 August to 9 October 1793 when French Republican forces laid siege and captured the city of Lyon, which was the centre of a revolt against the French government during the War of the First Coalition.

== Historical background ==
The Army of the Alps, under the command of Kellermann, was engaged in a campaign in Savoy against the Piedmontese when it received the assignment to head west in order to re-establish central government authority in Lyon, and was able to turn its attention to its new mission only a month later, on 10 August 1793. Two days after that, on 12 August 1793, the rebellious department was split into two, creating on the western side of the river the department of Loire with its capital at Feurs and, on the eastern side, the department of Rhône. Just over a week later, on 21 August, the Paris government sent to Lyon a high level team that included Georges Couthon, a leading member of the Committee of Public Safety and a close colleague of Robespierre himself. The next day the revolutionary army began its bombardment. During September Lyon was encircled, and on 29 September 1793, on the south-western side of the city, the fort at Sainte-Foy was destroyed.

== The siege ==
On 3 October 1793 Couthon called upon the Lyonnais to surrender, and a truce was observed until 7 October. The various representatives leading the city held a succession of group discussions, and on 8 October they sent a team to negotiate with the government representatives, albeit in the face of the opposition of Précy. At the same time two more of the defenders' forts fell, at Saint-Irénée and Saint-Just.

The next day, at dawn, Précy escaped via a district in the north-west of Lyon called Vaise, and went into hiding, turning up shortly afterwards in Switzerland. The city's civil authorities surrendered to the central government representatives at midday.

== Aftermath ==
On 11 October the government delegates decided on the destruction of the city walls. On 12 October Barère, a leading member of the government, put a decree through the convention that Lyon was to lose its name, and would instead be known as Ville-Affranchie (Liberated City) and would be destroyed. All the properties occupied by rich people would be demolished, leaving just the houses of the poor and the homes of duped or banished patriots, buildings specially dedicated to industry and monuments dedicated to humanity and public instruction. On the ruins of Lyon would be erected a commemorative column which would testify to posterity the crimes committed and the punishment received by the city's royalists, with the inscription "Lyon made war on liberty: Lyon is no more!". In the event, of 600 houses scheduled for demolition, only about fifty were actually destroyed.
