= Revolt of Lyon against the National Convention =

Counter-revolutionary movement in 1793

The revolt of Lyon against the National Convention was a counter-revolutionary movement in the city of Lyon during the time of the French Revolution. It was a revolt of moderates against the more radical National Convention, the third government during the French Revolution. It broke out in June 1793 and was put down in October of the same year, after government forces had besieged the city.

== The city confronts economic crisis ==
In 1789 Lyon was the only city in France other than Paris with a population above 100,000. The city was a regional focus for banking, commerce and manufacturing. In terms of employment its leading industry was silk weaving, which directly supported a third of the population. The silk industry in 1789 was in crisis, reflecting the wider economic crisis afflicting France at that time. The city was visited by the keen eyed English documentary writer Arthur Young in December of that year: he estimated that 20,000 people were living from charity and starving.

Tax riots broke out in June 1789 and again in July 1790. Citizens hoped that the Estates-General of 1789 would cancel the taxation privileges of the city's merchant oligarchs whereby the burden of taxation fell on those least able to pay, by means of the octroi, a tax on basic necessities. City elections returned a local government that retained the octroi, triggering a new riot in the city. Continuing mutual intransigence over the taxation issue led to fresh riots accompanied by the ransacking of several of the houses belonging to Lyon's richest citizens along with a continuation of the taxation on necessities.

These social conflicts bound together the interests of the old royalist elite under the leadership of Jacques Imbert-Colomès with those of the revolutionary patriots surrounding the local industrialist turned politician Jean-Marie Roland. Lower down the social scale, small-scale employers were opposed to taxation that increased living costs of employees whose salaries could therefore not be further cut, and the affected employees thereby felt closer affinity with their bosses and with the manufacturing interest in the city than with the desperate plight of the large numbers of unemployed.

== Political opposition, 1790–1793 ==
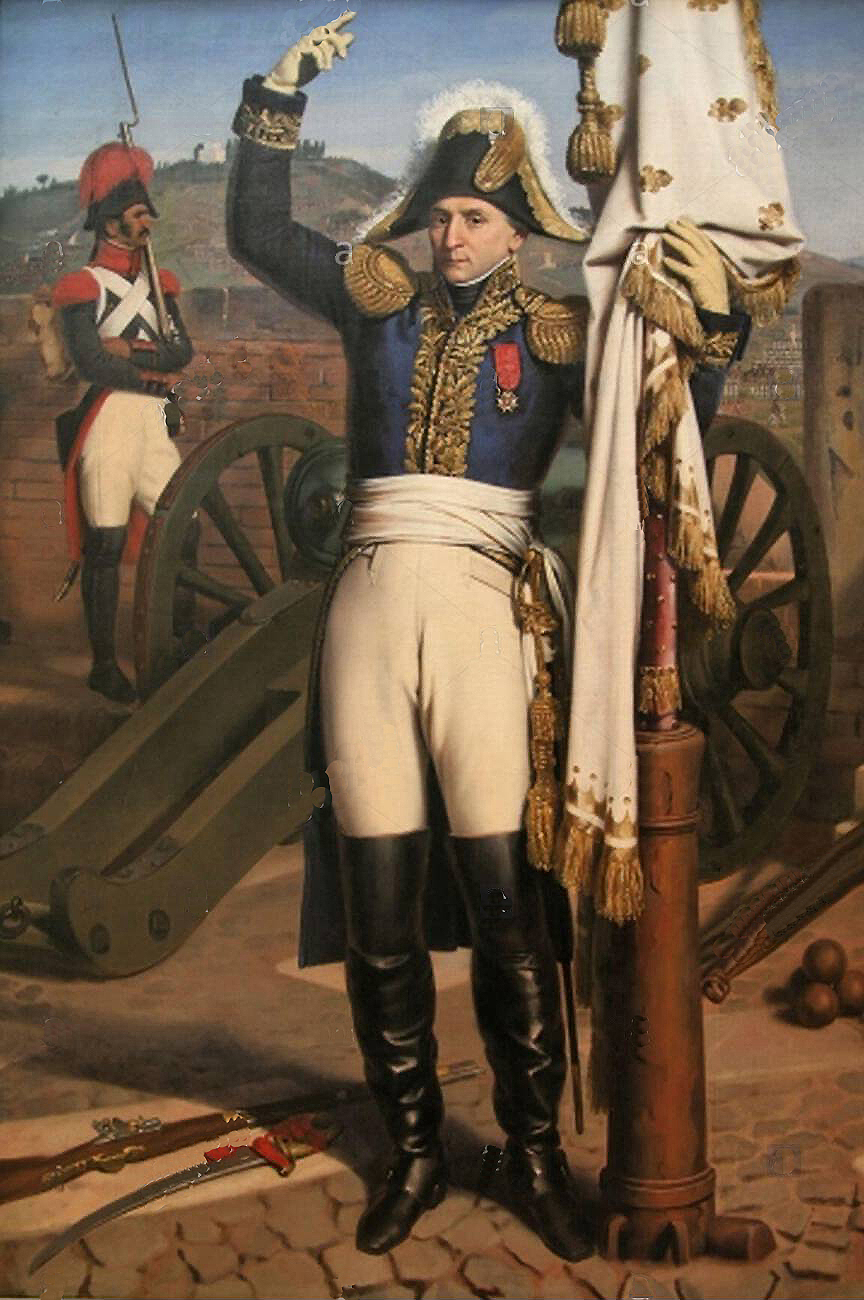
Louis François Perrin de Précy, leader of the Lyon insurgents, painted by Jean-Joseph Dassy.

During September 1790 the city's working class activists established 32 revolutionary societies to which they gave the name "Peoples' associations of friends of the [revolutionary] constitution" ("Sociétés populaires des Amis de la Constitution"). These were established in opposition to more bourgeois revolutionary societies such as "The association of friends of the revolution" ("Société des Amis de la Révolution"), membership of which was restricted to "active citizens", and the "Friends of the constitution" ("Amis de la Constitution"), which was affiliated to the network of Jacobin Clubs springing up around France in the wake of the revolution. A central committee, which quickly became known as the "Central Club" ("Club central"), provided a meeting point for delegates from the city's many sectional revolutionary societies. The "Central Club" was initially controlled by the Rolandin faction, but quickly came under the direction of the more dynamic elements around Joseph Chalier.

At this time each department was governed under a local version of the national directoral structure, and the departmental directory of Rhône-et-Loire, which since 1790 had been the department centred on Lyon, was dominated by constitutional royalists. The Rolandin Louis Vitet became mayor of Lyon in 1790. The "Central Club", headed up by Chalier, was strongly opposed to the approach taken by the local regime.

In the summer of 1792, the troop of revolutionary volunteers passed through on their way from Marseille to Paris, which radicalised the mood in Lyon. While the local manufacturer Roland was in Paris, serving as the nation's Interior Minister, eight officers and four priests were killed.

In November 1792, the girondin Nivière-Chol was elected mayor of Lyon in place of Vitet who had been elected to sit in the National Convention in Paris. Confronted by economic stagnation, he persuaded the assembly to approve an interest free loan of three million francs to be divided between the citizens in proportion to their wealth. This enraged the bourgeoisie but gained approval from royalists.

Matters came to a head in February 1793 when Chalier's "Central Club" called for the creation of a Revolutionary Tribunal. The mayor was not in favour of this idea and set about mobilising troops. which provoked a popular insurrection. As more time went on the hostility between the upper and lower classes only increased. Joseph Chalier started to become known as a fanatic and having too radical of policies towards the upper class in the city of Lyon. Most famously he was known for saying that towards any that opposed that he was "prepared to exterminate all that goes by the name of aristocrat, moderate, royalist." The combination of Joseph Chalier's extreme radicalism and the confused environment of Lyon contributed towards the general Jacobin population losing control over city affairs.

To try to defuse the crisis, Mayor Nivière-Chol now resigned and was re-elected. Meanwhile, allies and opponents of Chalier argued in the various "Peoples' Associations" which were now finding themselves opposing the "Central Club". Mayor Nivière-Chol resigned again, and was replaced by the moderate Jean-Emmanuel Gilibert who was elected in a contest against an ally of Chalier's named Antoine-Marie Bertrand. As news came through of the treason of Dumouriez, Gilibert's position became unsustainable and he was succeeded as mayor on 9 March 1793 by Bertrand: this ushered in a period of 80 days during which the city hall operated under the control of Chalier's faction.

A series of radical enactments followed, starting on 14 March 1793 with the establishment of a municipal bakery. Taxation was imposed on food (which disappeared from the shops) and a volunteer force was recruited. A seven-man Lyon Committee of Public Safety (taking its name and inspiration from the national institution of that name established under Robespierre a few weeks earlier in Paris) was set up on 8 April 1793. Urging further progress down the revolutionary path, on 4 May the "Central Club" proposed the guillotine become a permanent fixture, together with the "Popular Associations" and called again for the creation of a Revolutionary Tribunal. They also called for a Committee of Revolutionary Surveillance and of an "Armée Révolutionnaire" (Revolutionary Army) to replace the National Guard which had itself been established only in 1789 as a force for stability. A few days later, on 14 May 1793, the city council duly voted to create a Sans-culottes army and a 6 million franc fund, to be created from taxing the rich, to pay for it all.

They also voted for a joint meeting, every day, for representatives from the department, the district and the commune. This last measure triggered a counter-offensive. During the days that followed a growing proportion, and ultimately a majority, of delegates at these meetings opposed the municipal law of 14 May. Meanwhile, in Paris, the Girondist deputy Chasset persuaded the revolutionary government to annul the laws originating with locally based extraordinary "tribunals". Events in Lyon, France's second city, were of particular concern to the national government which now sent four of its own members to Lyon, these being the deputies Albitte, Dubois-Crancé, Gauthier and Nioche. Their doubts thus endorsed, virtually the entire Lyon tribunal voted down the law of 14 May 1793.

== Chalier's fall ==
On 29 May, a meeting at the Arsenal building of the various sectional delegates decided to replace the radical municipal government, which in military terms was only lightly defended. Gauthier and Nioche, two of the high-level representatives from the national government, arrived and were placed under guard. During the night Chalier's partisans were arrested and a moderate named Bénami was nominated as provisional president. The following day a man named Coindre became mayor and Judge Ampère (better remembered by posterity as the father of the electricity pioneer, André-Marie Ampère) received instructions to launch the trial of Joseph Chalier and his friends.

Meanwhile, events in the capital were moving fast, and the violent events of 31 May – 2 June 1793 saw the girondists ejected from the national government, under pressure from Paris-based radicals. The newly radical national government saw the events in Lyon as part of a more widespread Girondist revolt threatening the authority of central government: Such concerns proved well justified a couple of weeks later, as during June 1793, the municipal leaders in Lyon were linking up both with neighbouring departments and with other "insurgent cities" in the French south, Marseille, Nîmes and Bordeaux. Lyon now insisted on a meeting among the potentially separatist municipalities and departments to be convened at Bourges, as a form of alternative to the National Convention meeting in Paris. The municipality also had command of an army of approximately 10,000 which, though largely popular in its composition, was commanded by royalists led by the Count of Précy, with an aristocratic group of officers including Stanislas Marie Adelaide, comte de Clermont-Tonnerre, Virieu, Pantigny, Nolhac, Villeneuve, La Roche d'Angly and de Melon.

The National Convention sent Robert Lindet to negotiate with the leaders in Lyon, but he found the local representatives in the Arsenal Building in an uncompromising mood: intransigence was stiffened by the presence at Lyon of Jean Bonaventure Birotteau, one of the girondist deputies whom the government had so recently expelled from their own National Convention. On 30 June 1793, 207 delegates representing nearby cantons, the department and the urban districts appointed a "Popular Republican Commission for the Public Safety of Rhône-et-Loire", which published an "Address from the authorities duly constituted at Lyon to the armies, the citizens and all the departments in the republic". The National Convention, its orders having been ignored by the leaders in Lyon, now promulgated a series of decrees on 12 and 14 July 1793. They declared Birotteau an outlaw, dismissed the Lyon leaders, confiscating their assets; and they ordered the Revolutionary Army of the Alps to re-establish in Lyon the Laws of the Republic.

It was in this context of exacerbated conflict that Chalier found himself condemned to death on 16 July 1793. He was guillotined the next day, followed on 31 July 1793 by Ryard, the man who had commanded the commune troops on 31 May 1793. A partisan of Chalier's called Higgins killed himself in prison, and another of the local montagnard leaders was cut down in the street. At the same time within the city leadership moderate republicans were being progressively replaced by royalists.

== Siege of Lyon ==
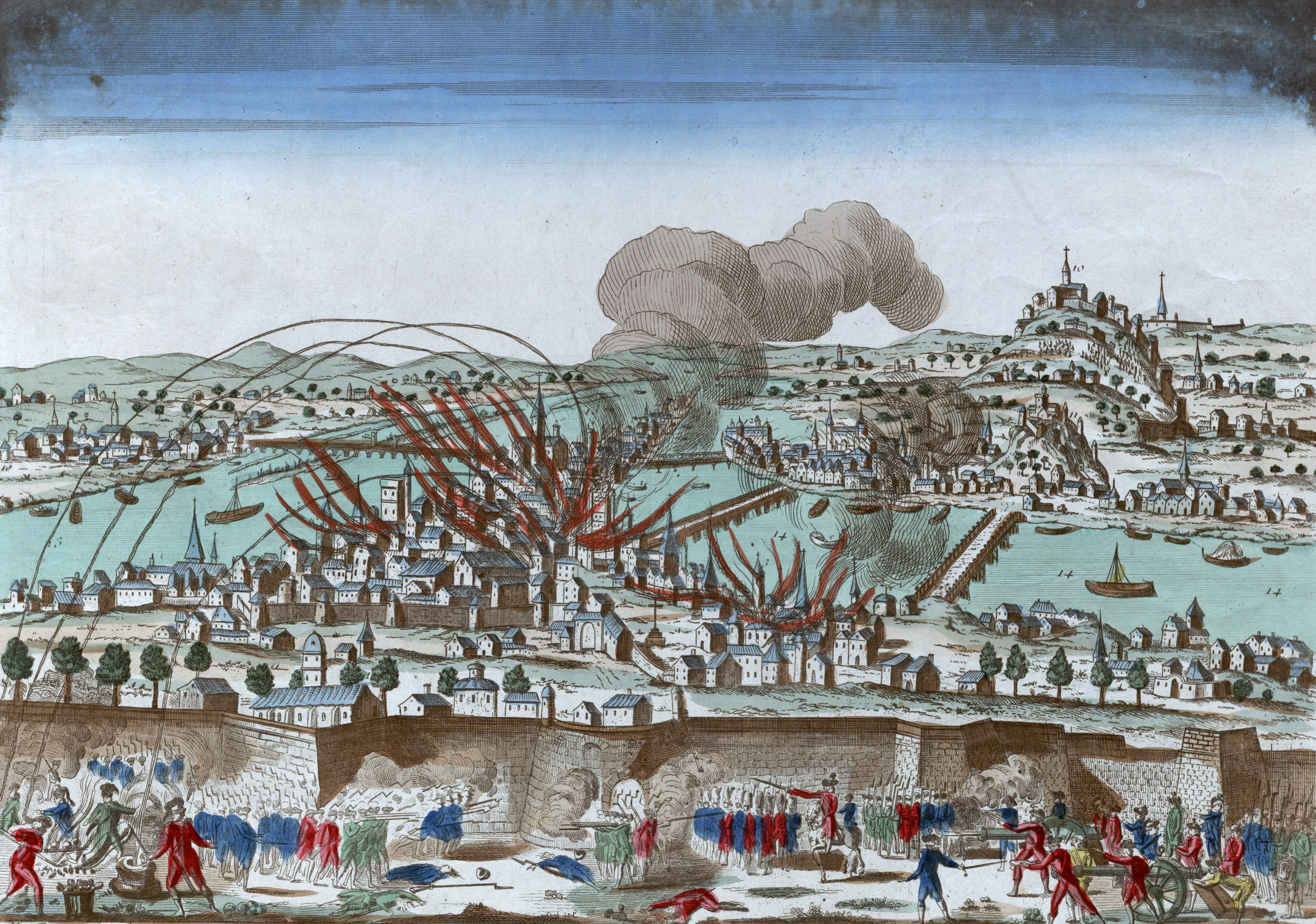
Siège de Lyon

The Army of the Alps, under the command of Kellermann, was engaged in a campaign in Savoy against the Piedmontese when it received the assignment to head west in order to re-establish central government authority in Lyon, and was able to turn its attention to its new mission only a month later, on 10 August 1793. Two days after that, on 12 August 1793, the rebellious department was split into two, creating on the western side of the river the department of Loire with its capital at Feurs and, on the eastern side, the department of Rhône. Just over a week later, on 21 August, the Paris government sent to Lyon a high level team that included Georges Couthon, a leading member of the Committee of Public Safety and a close colleague of Robespierre himself. The next day the revolutionary army began its bombardment. During September Lyon was encircled, and on 29 September 1793, on the south-western side of the city, the fort at Sainte-Foy was destroyed.

On 3 October 1793, Couthon called upon the Lyonnais to surrender, and a truce was observed until 7 October. The various representatives leading the city held a succession of group discussions, and on 8 October they sent a team to negotiate with the government representatives, albeit in the face of the opposition of Précy. At the same time two more of the defenders' forts fell, at Saint-Irénée and Saint-Just.

The next day, at dawn, Précy escaped via a district in the north-west of Lyon called Vaise, and went into hiding, turning up shortly afterwards in Switzerland. The city's civil authorities surrendered to the central government representatives at midday.

On 11 October, the government delegates decided on the destruction of the city walls. On 12 October Barère, a leading member of the government, put a decree through the convention that Lyon was to lose its name, and would instead be known as Ville-Affranchie (Emancipated City) and would be destroyed. All the properties occupied by rich people would be demolished, leaving just the houses of the poor and the homes of duped or banished patriots, buildings specially dedicated to industry and monuments dedicated to humanity and public instruction. On the ruins of Lyon would be erected a commemorative column which would testify to posterity the crimes committed and the punishment received by the city's royalists, with the inscription "Lyon made war on liberty: Lyon is no more!" In the event, of 600 houses scheduled for demolition, only about fifty were actually destroyed.

== Retribution ==
Moving quickly, on 9 October, the government representatives had created both a "Military Commission", charged with judging people who had taken up arms, and a "Commission of Peoples' Justice" which was to judge the other "rebels". Three days later the National Convention itself decided to create a five-member "Extraordinary Commission" which they tasked with imposing "immediate military punishment" on the "criminal counter-revolutionaries of Lyon".

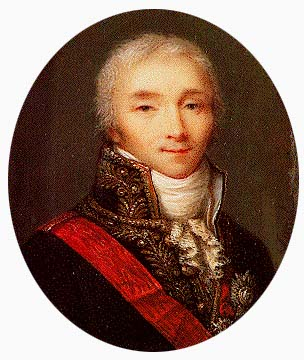
Joseph Fouché

The "Military Commission" began work on 11 October and ordered the shooting of 106 people who had served the rebels' military leader, Précy. The "Commission of Peoples' Justice" got off to a slower start, beginning its work only on 21 October: it ordered the guillotining of 79 people including three of the moderates who had replaced Chalier back at the end of May, Bénami, Coindre and Judge Ampère. Both of these commissions disappeared on 9 December, by which time the centrally mandated "Extraordinary Commission" had taken over the application of retributive justice in Lyon.

The "Extraordinary Commission" sat between 30 November 1793 and 6 April 1794. It was presided over by General Parein, and decided early on to substitute collective shootings for the individual firing squad killings and guillotinings which had been imposed by the earlier commissions. On 4 December 1793, 60 of the condemned were killed using three cannon loaded with grape shot, and a further 208 or 209 were killed in the same way the next day. The killings ordered by the Commission took place on open ground in the Les Brotteaux quarter, near to the granary at La Part-Dieu. This method of killing was abandoned on 17 December 1793.

These massacres have been blamed both on Commission Chairman Parein and on the government representatives Jean-Marie Collot d'Herbois and Joseph Fouché, whom the Convention had appointed the previous month when they recalled Couthon to Paris. The victims of the commission were a diverse and in many cases distinguished group, including a former president of the department called Debrost, a former member of the Revolutionary Constituent Assembly called Merle, the architect Morand, the executioner who had executed Chalier, the Canon Roland, the Hôtel-Dieu Head Surgeon Pierre Bouchet, Feuillants, Rolandins, priests and other members of religious orders, merchants and manufacturers along with other aristocrats and commoners. The list also includes counter-revolutionaries sent to the Commission at Lyon from Feurs, from Montbrison, from Saint-Étienne and from the neighboring departments of Loire, Ain, Saône-et-Loire, Isère and Allier. This variety makes an objective quantification of the executions difficult. At its final sitting on 6 April 1794 the "Extraordinary Commission" itself reported that it had ordered the execution of 1,684 and the detention of a further 162: 1,682 were reported as having been acquitted.

== Aftermath ==
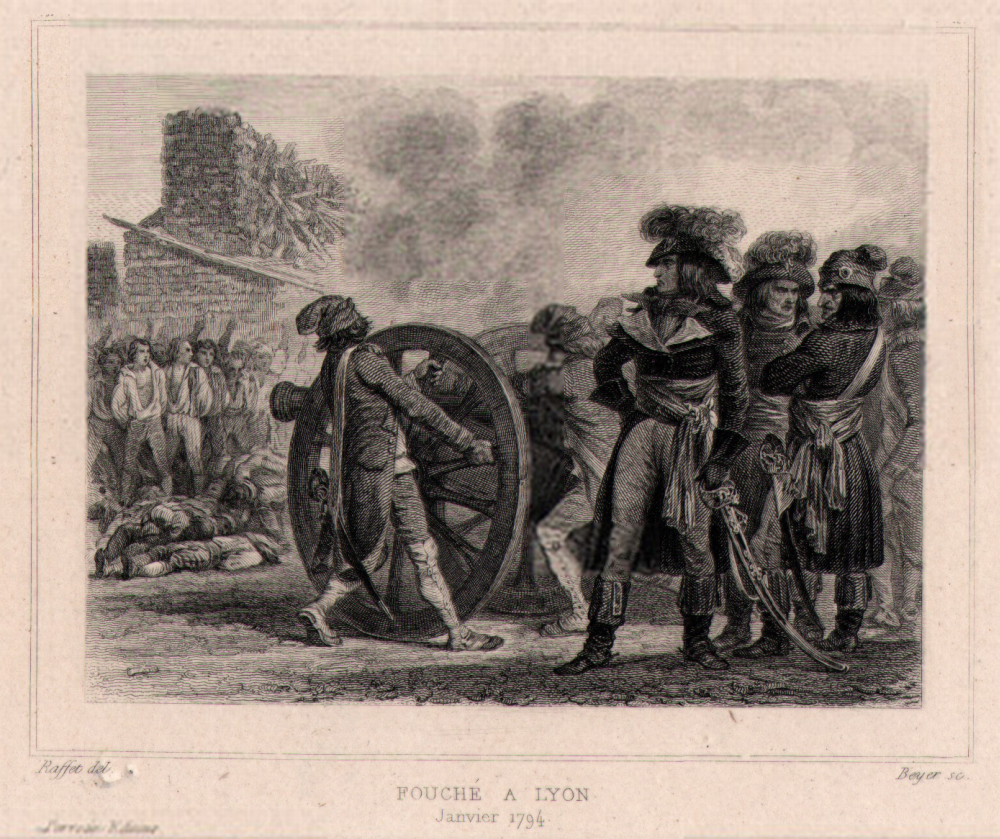
Fouché a Lyon drawn by Auguste Raffet 1834

The aftermath of the revolt was highlighted by three major results: the devastated silk trade, the lower wages of the people of Lyon, and the rift that was perpetuated between the people of Lyon and the National Convention.

The most noticeable effect was primarily the devastation of the silk trade. Prior to the revolt, it had been mainly an artisanal industry with Lyon being one of the largest pre–Industrial Revolution centers of production in France. Although Lyon continued to lead France in industry after the unsuccessful attempt to quell federalist sentiments, the silk trade was certainly affected, and local artisans needed to rebuild. This disruption had lasting effects on the silk industry in the city that continued for years before normal business was again established.

Another result of the revolt of Lyon was the dramatic decrease in wages after the suppression of the revolt and the introduction of larger-scale industry into the process of silk production. The decrease of specialization of labor in the silk industry greatly lowered the wage rates themselves. With the process of industrialization that occurred, anyone could become a master silk weaver. In some circles, the decrease in wages was seen as a public injustice. As silk production in Lyon was being rebuilt, the emphasis was placed more and more on centralized industrial production and less on the traditional artisan system.

Finally, as well as disrupting the silk trade, the revolt caused a lasting rift between the people of Lyon and the radical government of Paris. A sense of resentment and outrage against Paris was especially prevalent in Lyon due to the extreme actions taken during this suppression. While Lyon did not organize another revolt, a general sense of distrust against Paris continued to permeate the population of Lyon, especially among the families of those who had been executed. This anti-Parisian, federalist sentiment which had existed before the revolt, and its subsequent violent suppression, persisted in the city, as many in Lyon continued to see Paris as too radically revolutionary. There is evidence that few citizens of Lyon moved away in the aftermath, likely due to the fact that most of the architecture of Lyon did remain intact, contrary to the rhetoric of the leaders of the suppression, which suggested that it should be completely destroyed. Those who did move tended to migrate further south, towards Marseille and away from Paris, in an attempt to further distance themselves from Paris.

Although revolutionary intervention was meant as a way to increase fervor for the new republic and its politics, it only succeeded in creating a more strongly polarized environment through the violent suppression of the revolt. It did not do well in quelling counterrevolutionary thought, rather prompting these thoughts and giving direction to their complaints against the republic. If anything, the violence soured relations. By December 1794, some 2,000 people had been executed in Lyon. Politically speaking, a commission of citizens from Lyon travelled to Paris to petition the National Convention, asking to be reconciled with the Republic. Jean-Marie Collot also returned to Paris to block Lyon's petition, and when the Convention turned it over to the Committee of Public Safety, Collot and the other committee members did not act on it.

== Commemoration ==
A list of the victims of Parein's commission is kept in a Carthusian Chapel of Penitence erected on the site of the mass shootings. It was compiled using the commission's own records.

The bones of the 209 Lyonnais shot dead on 3 December 1793 at Brotteaux have been conserved in the crypt of the Chapel of Brotteaux in the sixth arrondissement, in the north-eastern part of central Lyon since the Bourbon restoration. (Note: At the end of the nineteenth century the chapel was destroyed and rebuilt twenty meters along the road.)

In 1989, France celebrated the two hundredth anniversary of the French Revolution, and two organisations named Lyon 89 and Lyon 93 brought together descendants of the victims of the siege and of the ensuing repression. A third organisation, called Rhône 89, though overtly republican and secularist, also placed a greater priority on historical understanding of the events.

The siege of Lyon also inspired several popular songs.
