= Château de Couzan =

Castle in Sail-sous-Couzan, Loire, France

Coordinates: 45°43′41″N 3°58′09″E

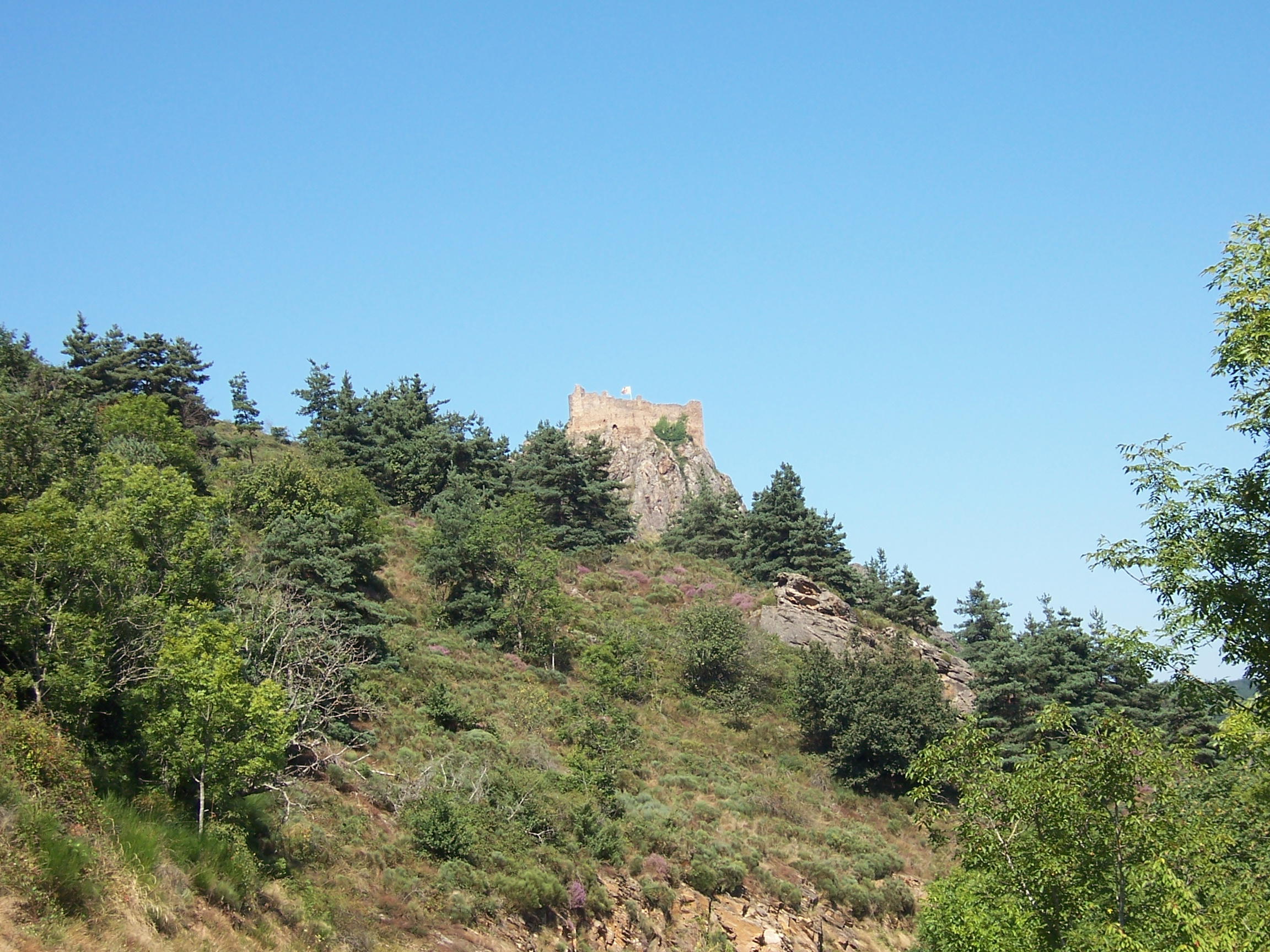

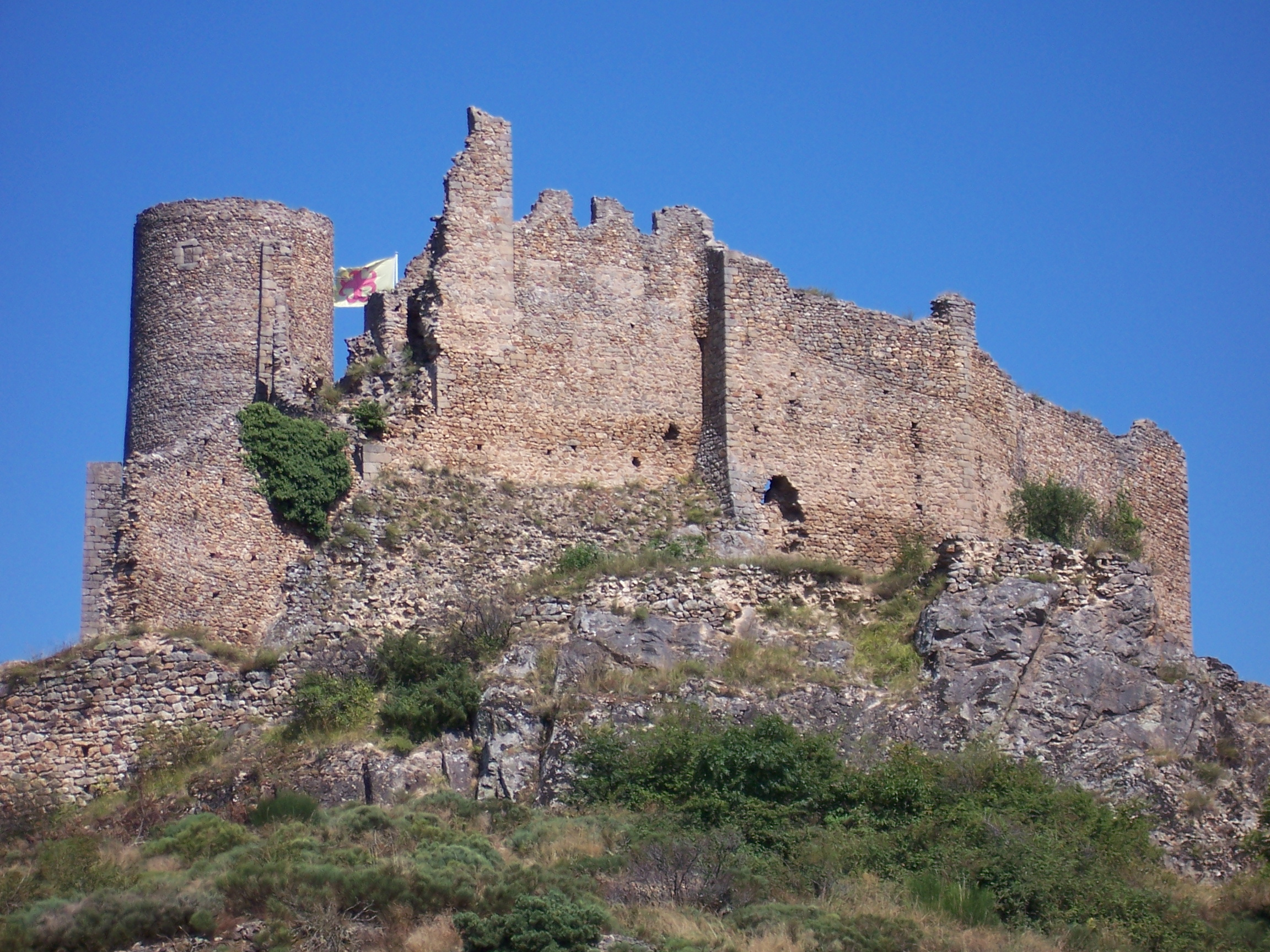
East face of the castle

The Château de Couzan is a ruined castle in the commune of Sail-sous-Couzan in the Loire département of France. The castle stands on a rocky outcrop to the west of Sail-sous-Couzan in the Forez mountains range above the Lignon du Forez river. The châtellenie of Couzan was the most important in the former province of Forez.

The castle is owned by a private society. It has been listed since 1890 as a monument historique by the French Ministry of Culture. The surrounding lands were added to the listing in 1947.

== History ==
Construction of the castle dates from the 11th century, with further building works in the 12th, 13th and 14th centuries.

- 11th century: The family of the barons of Semur (Damas) built the first castle.
- 15th century: The Lévis family took the fortress, following the marriage in 1425 of Eustache de Levis and Alix de Couzan, daughter of Hugues VI, baron of Damas-Couzan, known as "Hugues VI de Damas".
- 17th century: The castle was acquired by the Luzy family in 1622. They took the title of marquis de Couzan and first baron du Forez. This branch of the Luzy family died out at the end of the 18th century. The castle was then taken by Marthe de Luzy-Couzan, daughter of Balthazar de Luzy-Couzan, who married Antoine François de Thy de Milly. The castle stayed in the ownership of the family of the Counts of Thy de Milly until 1932.
- 1932: Acquired by DIANA (the Historic and Archaeological Society of Forez), which undertook extensive restoration works, the castle having been uninhabited since the French Revolution.

== Architecture ==
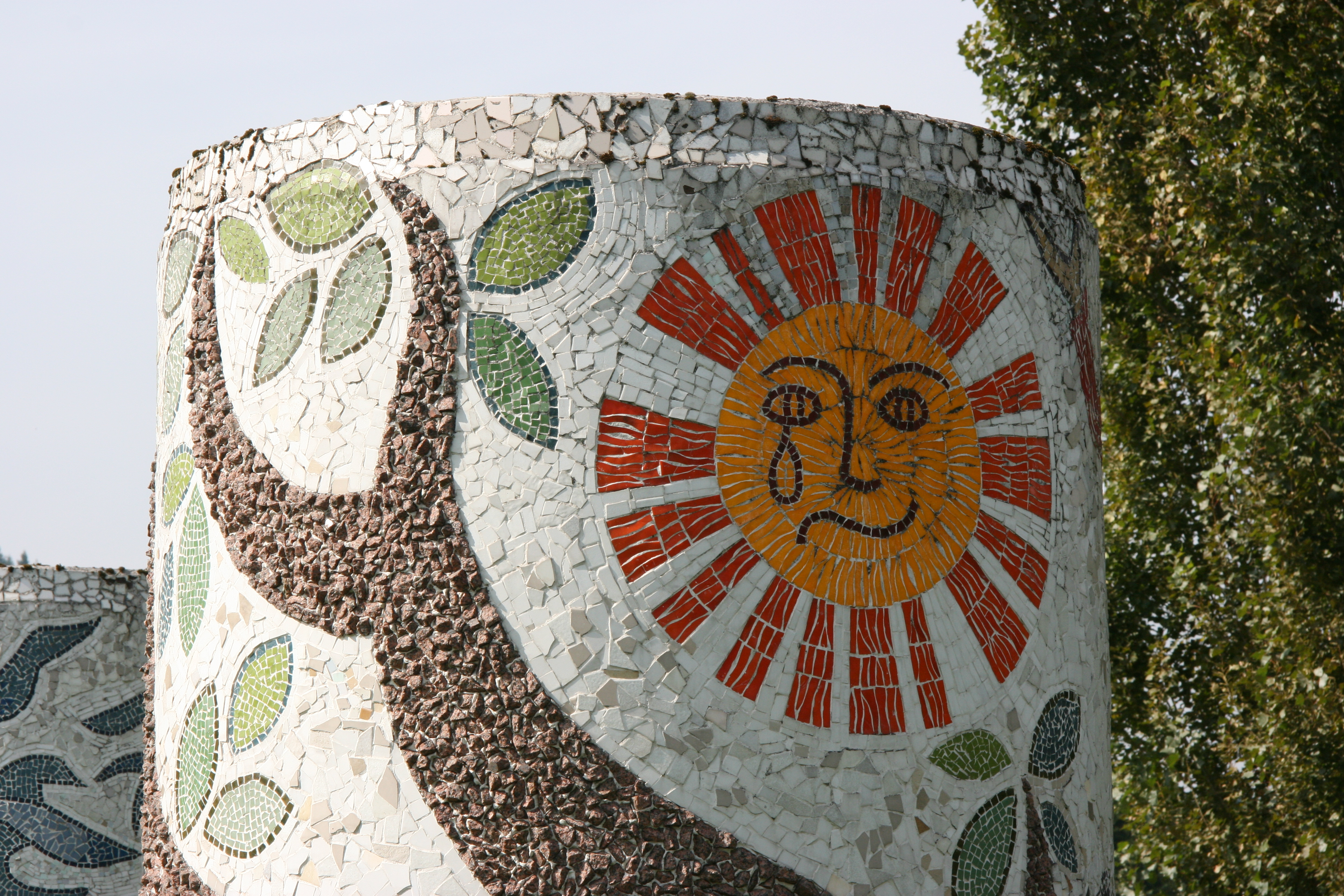
Modern emblem of Sail-sous-Couzan

The castle is composed of three enceinte walls surrounding a 13th-century keep.

During the Middle Ages, there was a square dressed stone into which a basin was cut - the pierre à Dîme (tithe stone). Each peasant owed to the lord a share of his harvest which he threw into the dîme. On each side of the stone were carved faces surrounded by a sun. Years of good harvest were represented by a smiling sun; bad harvests by a sun grimacing. This stone, in 1971, inspired the emblem of the commune of Sail-sous-Couzan, a sun head.

== See also ==
- List of castles in France

French Wikipedia has articles on the families which have owned the castle:

- Les barons de Semur
- Maison de Lévis
- Famille de Thy de Milly
