= Boën-sur-Lignon =

- Commune
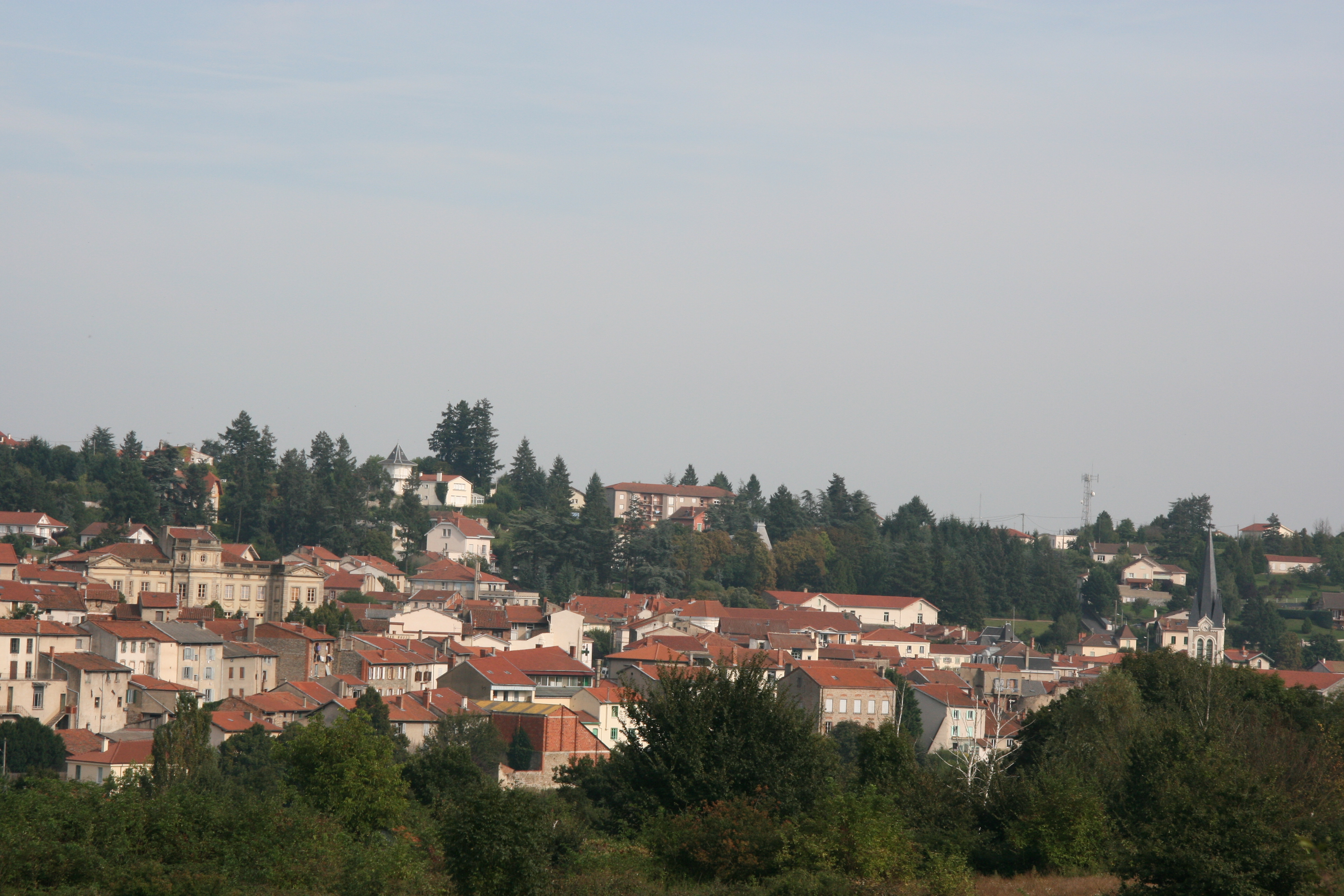

- Coat of arms
- Location of Boën-sur-Lignon
- Location within France Location within Auvergne-Rhône-Alpes
- Coordinates: 45°44′47″N 4°00′18″E
- Country: France
- Region: Auvergne-Rhône-Alpes
- Department: Loire
- Arrondissement: Montbrison
- Canton: Boën-sur-Lignon
- Intercommunality: CA Loire Forez

Government
  - Mayor (2023–2026): Anne Jouanjan
- Area^{1}: 6 km^{2} (2.3 sq mi)
- Highest elevation: 557 m (1,827 ft)
- Lowest elevation: 374 m (1,227 ft)
- Population (2023): 3,001
  - Density: 500/km^{2} (1,300/sq mi)
- Time zone: UTC+01:00 (CET)
  - Summer (DST): UTC+02:00 (CEST)
- INSEE/Postal code: 42019 /42130
- ^{1} French Land Register data, which excludes lakes, ponds, glaciers > 1 km^{2} (0.386 sq mi or 247 acres) and river estuaries.

Boën-sur-Lignon (French pronunciation: [bwɛ̃ syʁ liɲɔ̃], literally Boën on Lignon), formerly Boën, is a commune in the Loire department in central France.

== Geography ==
The river Lignon du Forez flows through the commune.

Boën-sur-Lignon is surrounded by the neighboring municipalities of Saint-Sixte to the north and northwest, Arthun to the northeast, Sainte-Agathe-la-Bouteresse to the east, Trelins to the south, and Leigneux to the west and southwest.

== Population ==
Historical population
Year	Pop.	±% p.a.
1968	3,654	—
1975	3,766	+0.43%
1982	3,603	−0.63%
1990	3,256	−1.26%
1999	3,112	−0.50%
2007	3,117	+0.02%
2012	3,204	+0.55%
2017	3,309	+0.65%
2023	3,001	−1.62%
Source: INSEE

== Sights ==
The commune is home to the 18th-century Château de Boën (or Château de Chabert), a neoclassical château designed by architect Michel Dal Gabbio. Classified as a monument historique, it houses the Musée des Vignerons du Forez (Museum of Forez Winegrowers), dedicated to local winemaking heritage and rural life.

== See also ==
- Communes of the Loire department
