= Jeansagnière =

Commune in Loire, France

- Part of Chalmazel-Jeansagnière
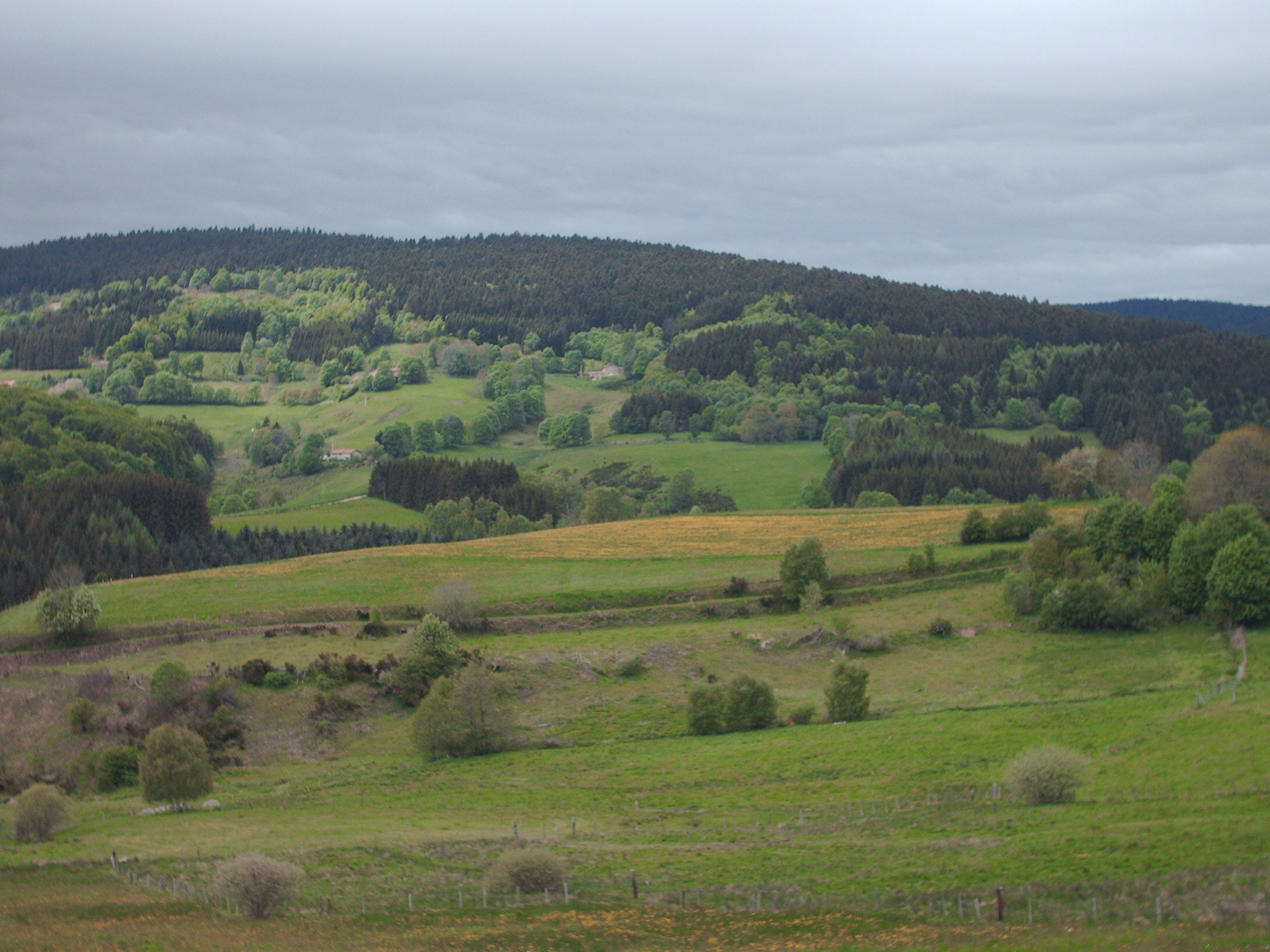
- Location of Jeansagnière
- Location within France Location within Auvergne-Rhône-Alpes
- Coordinates: 45°44′02″N 3°50′12″E
- Country: France
- Region: Auvergne-Rhône-Alpes
- Department: Loire
- Arrondissement: Montbrison
- Canton: Boën-sur-Lignon
- Commune: Chalmazel-Jeansagnière
- Area^{1}: 14.01 km^{2} (5.41 sq mi)
- Elevation: 1,100 m (3,600 ft)
- Highest elevation: 1,383 m (4,537 ft)
- Lowest elevation: 900 m (3,000 ft)
- Population (2022): 95
  - Density: 6.8/km^{2} (18/sq mi)
- Time zone: UTC+01:00 (CET)
  - Summer (DST): UTC+02:00 (CEST)
- Postal code: 42920
- ^{1} French Land Register data, which excludes lakes, ponds, glaciers > 1 km^{2} (0.386 sq mi or 247 acres) and river estuaries.

Jeansagnière (French pronunciation: [ʒɑ̃saɲɛʁ]; Arpitan: Genceniéres) is a former commune in the Loire department in central France. On 1 January 2016, it was merged into the new commune Chalmazel-Jeansagnière.

== Geography ==
The river Lignon du Forez formed all of the commune's southern border.

== See also ==
- Communes of the Loire department
