= Trelins =

- Commune
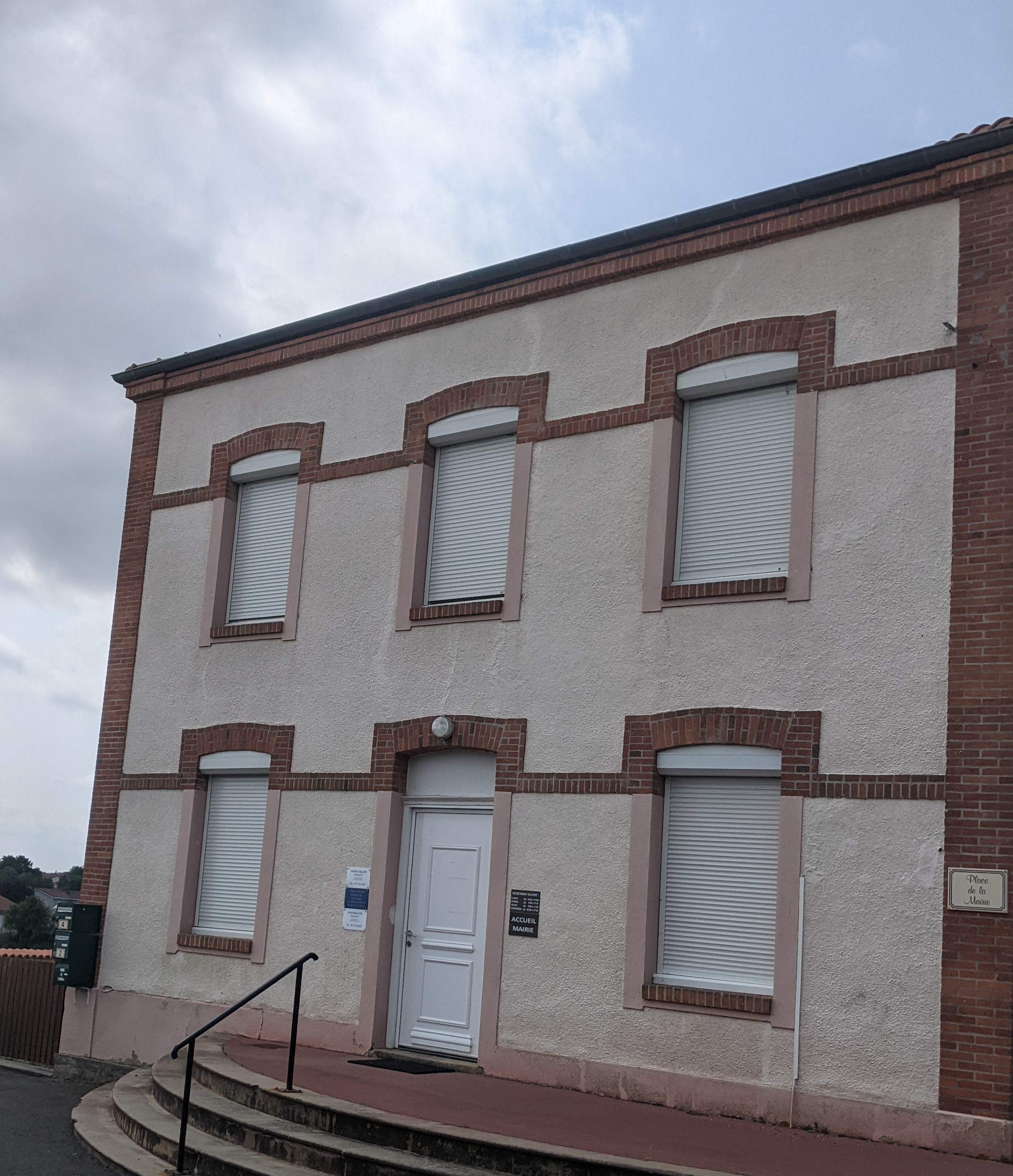
- Trelins Town hall
- Location of Trelins
- Location within France Location within Auvergne-Rhône-Alpes
- Coordinates: 45°43′54″N 4°00′31″E
- Country: France
- Region: Auvergne-Rhône-Alpes
- Department: Loire
- Arrondissement: Montbrison
- Canton: Boën-sur-Lignon
- Intercommunality: Loire Forez Agglomération

Government
  - Mayor (2020–2026): Alexandre Palmier
- Area^{1}: 8.09 km^{2} (3.12 sq mi)
- Elevation: 415 m (1,362 ft)
- Highest elevation: 736 m (2,415 ft)
- Lowest elevation: 368 m (1,207 ft)
- Population (2023): 682
  - Density: 84.3/km^{2} (218/sq mi)
- Time zone: UTC+01:00 (CET)
  - Summer (DST): UTC+02:00 (CEST)
- INSEE/Postal code: 42313 /42130
- ^{1} French Land Register data, which excludes lakes, ponds, glaciers > 1 km^{2} (0.386 sq mi or 247 acres) and river estuaries.

Trelins is a commune in the Loire department, Auvergne-Rhône-Alpes region, central France.

== Geography ==
The river Lignon du Forez flows through the commune.

== Population ==
Historical population
Year	Pop.	±% p.a.
1968	401	—
1975	396	−0.18%
1982	398	+0.07%
1990	492	+2.69%
1999	537	+0.98%
2007	567	+0.68%
2012	646	+2.64%
2017	654	+0.25%
2023	682	+0.70%
Source: INSEE

== See also ==
- Communes of the Loire department
