= Marcoux, Loire =

Marcoux Mèrcor (Arpitan)
- Commune
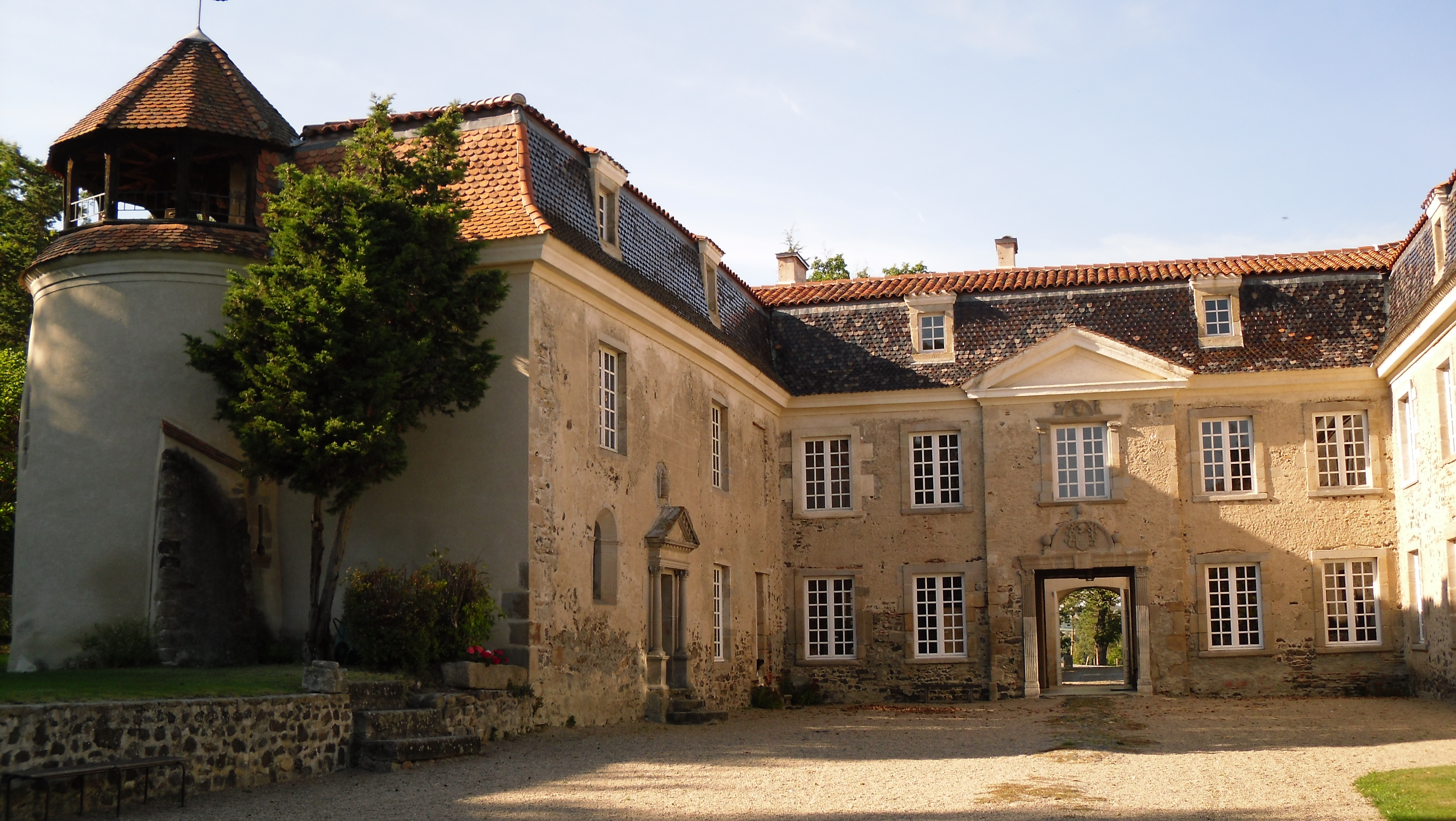
- Château de Goutelas

- Coat of arms
- Location of Marcoux
- Location within France Location within Auvergne-Rhône-Alpes
- Coordinates: 45°42′42″N 4°00′50″E
- Country: France
- Region: Auvergne-Rhône-Alpes
- Department: Loire
- Arrondissement: Montbrison
- Canton: Boën-sur-Lignon
- Intercommunality: CA Loire Forez

Government
  - Mayor (2020–2026): Pierre Verdier
- Area^{1}: 15.3 km^{2} (5.9 sq mi)
- Elevation: 500 m (1,600 ft)
- Highest elevation: 777 m (2,549 ft)
- Lowest elevation: 394 m (1,293 ft)
- Population (2023): 781
  - Density: 51.0/km^{2} (132/sq mi)
- Time zone: UTC+01:00 (CET)
  - Summer (DST): UTC+02:00 (CEST)
- INSEE/Postal code: 42136 /42130
- ^{1} French Land Register data, which excludes lakes, ponds, glaciers > 1 km^{2} (0.386 sq mi or 247 acres) and river estuaries.

Marcoux (French pronunciation: [maʁku]; Arpitan: Mèrcor [mar.ˈku]) is a commune in the Loire department in central France.

== Geography ==
The river Lignon du Forez flows through the commune.

== Population ==
Historical population
Year	Pop.	±% p.a.
1968	451	—
1975	464	+0.41%
1982	482	+0.55%
1990	522	+1.00%
1999	564	+0.86%
2007	664	+2.06%
2012	772	+3.06%
2017	735	−0.98%
2023	781	+1.02%
Source: INSEE

== See also ==
- Communes of the Loire department
