= Saint-Bonnet-le-Courreau =

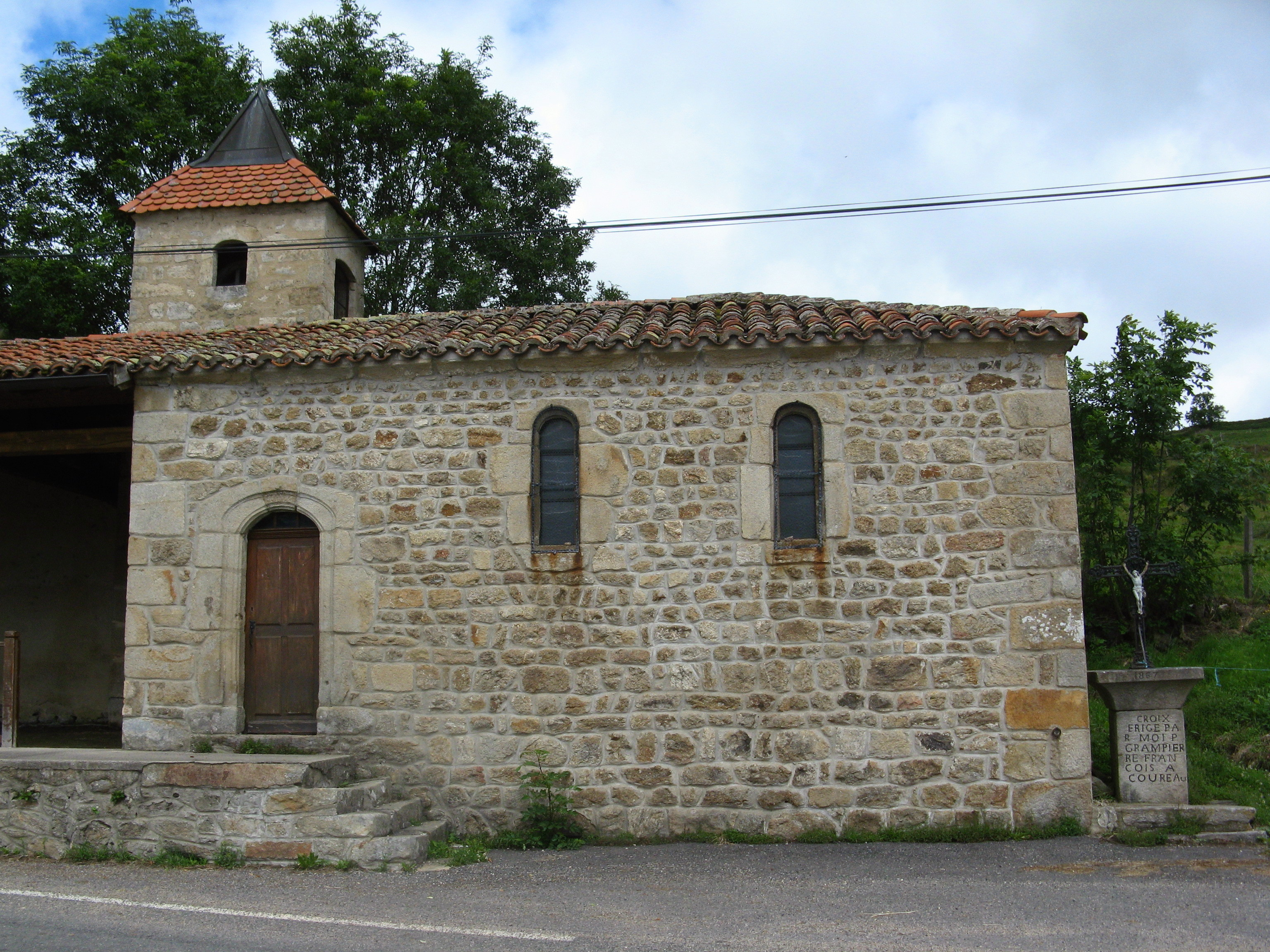
- Chapelle de Couureau
- Location of Saint-Bonnet-le-Courreau
- Location within France Location within Auvergne-Rhône-Alpes
- Coordinates: 45°39′40″N 3°56′41″E
- Country: France
- Region: Auvergne-Rhône-Alpes
- Department: Loire
- Arrondissement: Montbrison
- Canton: Boën-sur-Lignon
- Intercommunality: CA Loire Forez

Government
  - Mayor (2020–2026): Joël Épinat
- Area^{1}: 50.18 km^{2} (19.37 sq mi)
- Elevation: 1,023 m (3,356 ft)
- Highest elevation: 1,481 m (4,859 ft)
- Lowest elevation: 500 m (1,600 ft)
- Population (2023): 677
  - Density: 13.5/km^{2} (34.9/sq mi)
- Time zone: UTC+01:00 (CET)
  - Summer (DST): UTC+02:00 (CEST)
- INSEE/Postal code: 42205 /42940
- ^{1} French Land Register data, which excludes lakes, ponds, glaciers > 1 km^{2} (0.386 sq mi or 247 acres) and river estuaries.

Saint-Bonnet-le-Courreau (French pronunciation: [sɛ̃ bɔnɛ lə kuʁo]) is a commune in the Loire department in central France.

== Geography ==
The river Lignon du Forez flows through the commune.

== Population ==
Historical population
Year	Pop.	±% p.a.
1968	1,006	—
1975	1,005	−0.01%
1982	899	−1.58%
1990	805	−1.37%
1999	750	−0.78%
2007	735	−0.25%
2012	735	+0.00%
2017	687	−1.34%
2023	677	−0.24%
Source: INSEE

== See also ==
- Communes of the Loire department
