= Sainte-Agathe-la-Bouteresse =

- Commune
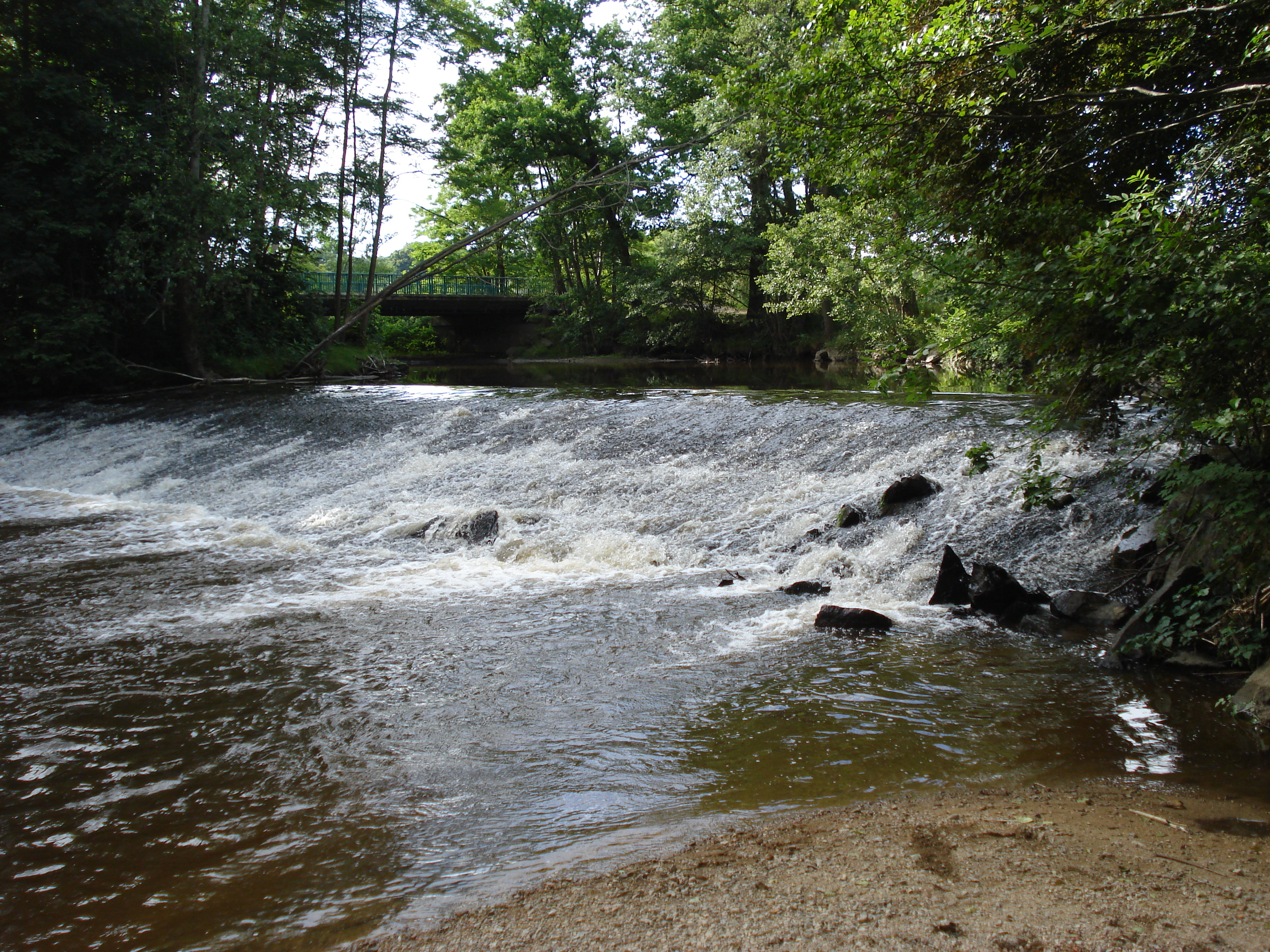
- A weir on the Lignon du Forez

- Coat of arms
- Location of Sainte-Agathe-la-Bouteresse
- Location within France Location within Auvergne-Rhône-Alpes
- Coordinates: 45°44′06″N 4°03′21″E
- Country: France
- Region: Auvergne-Rhône-Alpes
- Department: Loire
- Arrondissement: Montbrison
- Canton: Boën-sur-Lignon
- Intercommunality: CA Loire Forez

Government
  - Mayor (2020–2026): Pierre Drevet
- Area^{1}: 11.75 km^{2} (4.54 sq mi)
- Elevation: 387 m (1,270 ft)
- Highest elevation: 411 m (1,348 ft)
- Lowest elevation: 355 m (1,165 ft)
- Population (2023): 1,065
  - Density: 90.64/km^{2} (234.8/sq mi)
- Time zone: UTC+01:00 (CET)
  - Summer (DST): UTC+02:00 (CEST)
- INSEE/Postal code: 42197 /42130
- ^{1} French Land Register data, which excludes lakes, ponds, glaciers > 1 km^{2} (0.386 sq mi or 247 acres) and river estuaries.

Sainte-Agathe-la-Bouteresse (French pronunciation: [sɛ̃t aɡat la butʁɛs]) is a commune in the Loire department in central France.

== Geography ==
The river Lignon du Forez flows through the commune.

== Population ==
Historical population
| Year | Pop. | ±% p.a. |
|---|---|---|
| 1968 | 757 | — |
| 1975 | 791 | +0.63% |
| 1982 | 831 | +0.71% |
| 1990 | 846 | +0.22% |
| 1999 | 813 | −0.44% |
| 2007 | 924 | +1.61% |
| 2012 | 1,084 | +3.25% |
| 2017 | 1,023 | −1.15% |
| 2023 | 1,065 | +0.67% |
Source: INSEE

== See also ==
- Communes of the Loire department
