= Leigneux =

- Commune
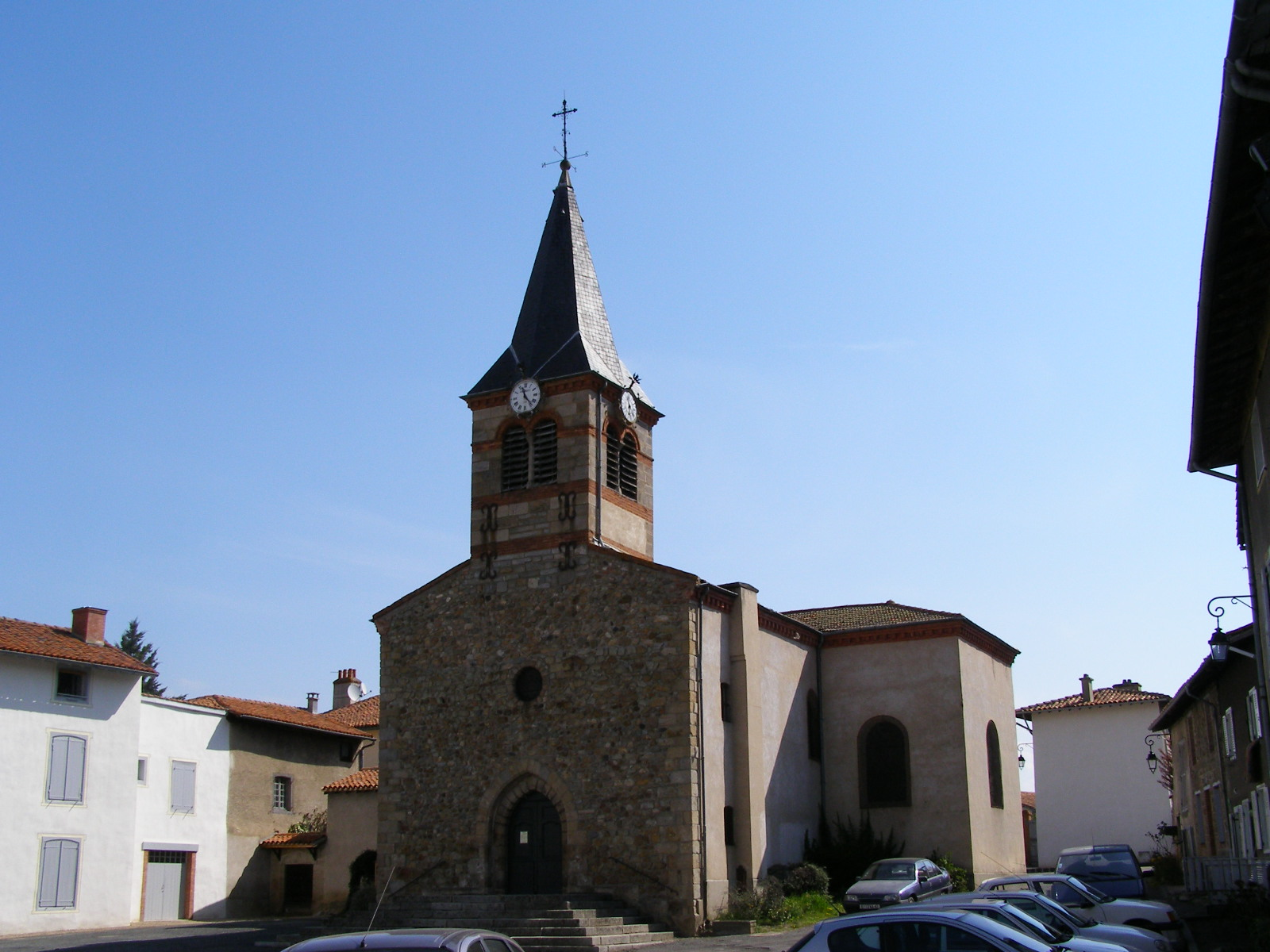
- Location of Leigneux
- Location within France Location within Auvergne-Rhône-Alpes
- Coordinates: 45°45′08″N 3°58′37″E
- Country: France
- Region: Auvergne-Rhône-Alpes
- Department: Loire
- Arrondissement: Montbrison
- Canton: Boën-sur-Lignon
- Intercommunality: CA Loire Forez

Government
  - Mayor (2020–2026): Marie-Gabrielle Pfister
- Area^{1}: 4.53 km^{2} (1.75 sq mi)
- Elevation: 438 m (1,437 ft)
- Highest elevation: 581 m (1,906 ft)
- Lowest elevation: 389 m (1,276 ft)
- Population (2023): 359
  - Density: 79.2/km^{2} (205/sq mi)
- Time zone: UTC+01:00 (CET)
  - Summer (DST): UTC+02:00 (CEST)
- INSEE/Postal code: 42119 /42130
- ^{1} French Land Register data, which excludes lakes, ponds, glaciers > 1 km^{2} (0.386 sq mi or 247 acres) and river estuaries.

Leigneux (French pronunciation: [lɛɲø]) is a commune in the Loire department in central France.

== Geography ==
The river Lignon du Forez flows through the commune.

== Population ==
Historical population
Year	Pop.	±% p.a.
1968	445	—
1975	410	−1.16%
1982	397	−0.46%
1990	328	−2.36%
1999	350	+0.72%
2007	345	−0.18%
2012	409	+3.46%
2017	377	−1.62%
2023	359	−0.81%
Source: INSEE

== See also ==
- Communes of the Loire department
