= Joseph Chalier =

French lawyer (1747–1793)

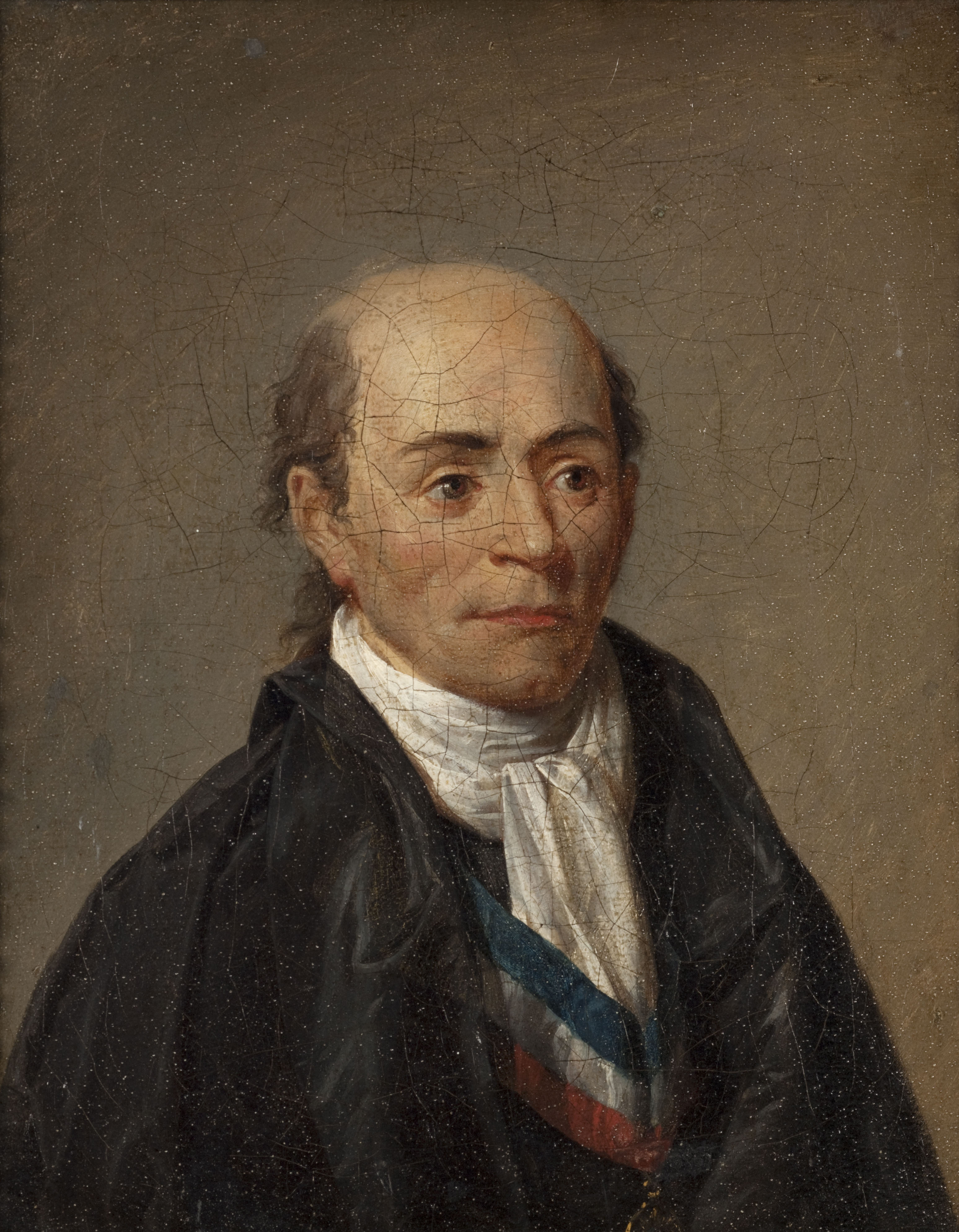
Joseph Chalier

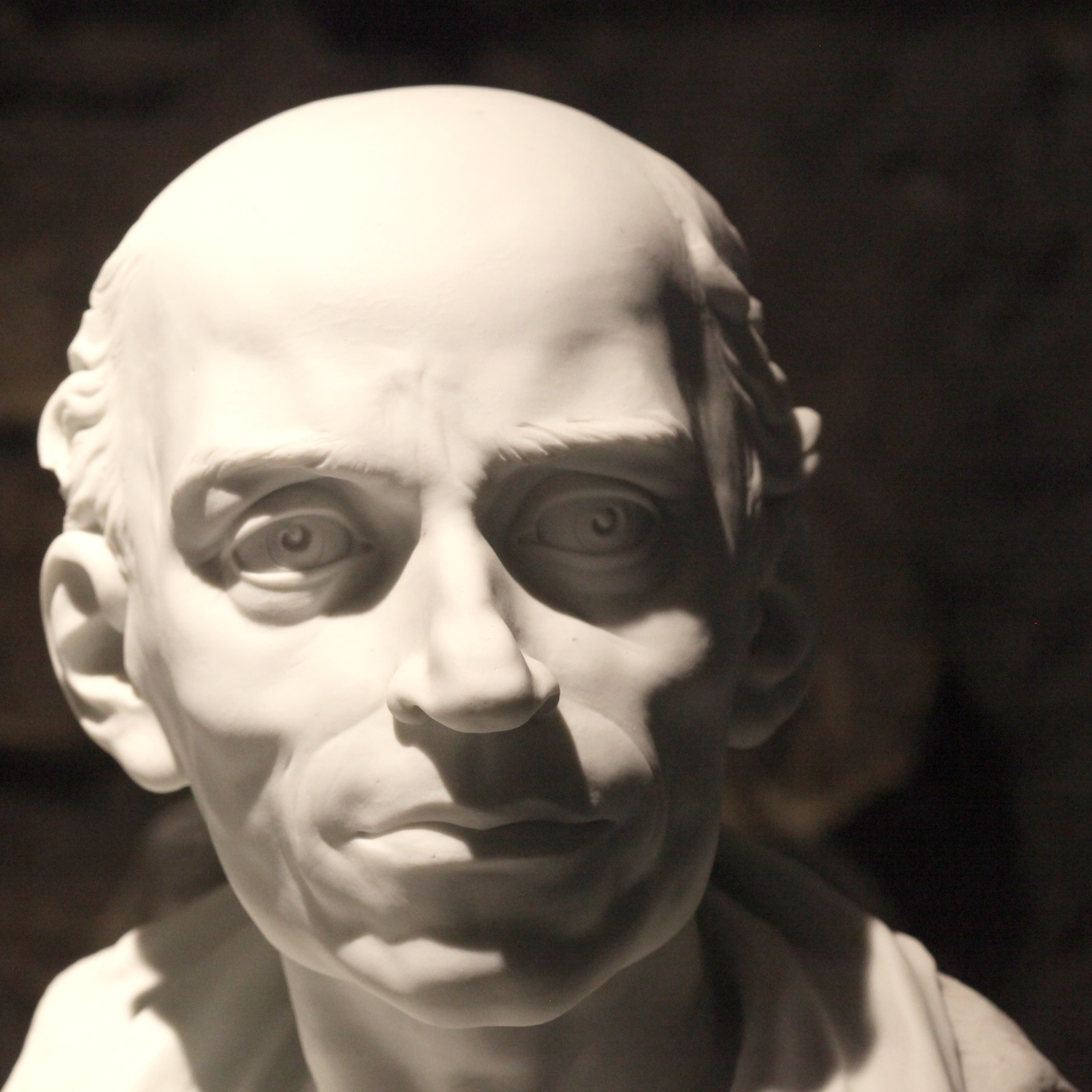
Porcelaine bust of Chalier made after his death

Joseph Chalier (1747–1793) was a French lawyer and revolutionary politician who was active in Lyon.

Chalier was born in Beaulard, Susa Valley, Piedmont. As a young man, Chalier's family hoped he would take a career in the church. But instead he became a partner in a law firm in Lyon. Because of his job with the firm, he traveled to Levant, Italy, Spain and Portugal. While living in Paris in 1789, he became acquainted with Marat, Camille Desmoulins and Robespierre. After returning to Lyon, Chalier was the first person to be named as a member of the municipal bureau. While in this position he organized the national guard, applied the Civil Constitution of the Clergy, and engineered the finances of the city so that the rich were heavily taxed and the poor relatively spared.

For making a nocturnal domiciliary perquisition, Chalier was denounced in front of the Legislative Assembly by the département of Rhône-et-Loire. However, the Assembly's bar did not disapprove of his conduct. Chalier later ran for mayor of Lyon in November 1792, but lost to the Royalist opposition. Soon after, Chalier became the leader of the Jacobins of Lyon, a move which ultimately led to his demise.

Working with other revolutionary clubs and communes in the city, he led the Jacobins to arrest a great number of Royalists during the nights of the 5th and 6 February 1793. This brought him into direct conflict with the mayor of Lyons, who had the support of the National Guard. Undeterred, Chalier demanded of the Convention an establishment of a revolutionary tribunal and a revolutionary army stationed in Lyon. The Convention refused and the anti-revolutionary party took action. On the 29th and 30 May 1793, the different sections rose against him. The Jacobins were dispossessed of the municipality and Chalier was arrested. On the 15th of July, he was brought before the criminal tribunal of the Rhône-et-Loire, which condemned him to death. He was guillotined the next day in Lyon. Soon after, the revolutionary forces during the "reign of terror" held his memory in high esteem, as a martyr for Liberty.
