= Sail-sous-Couzan =

- Commune
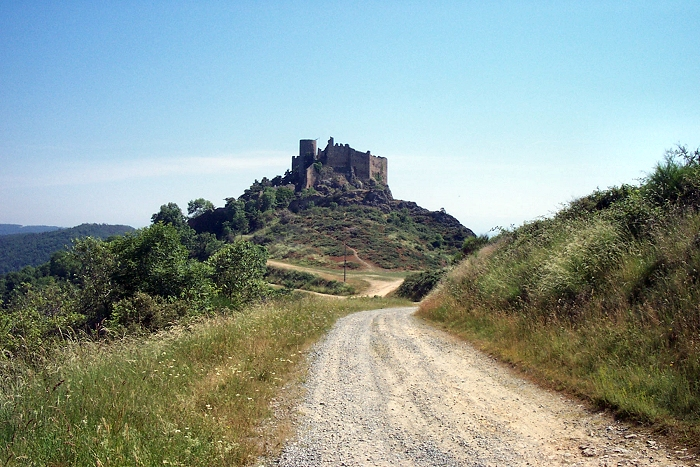
- Château de Couzan

- Coat of arms
- Location of Sail-sous-Couzan
- Location within France Location within Auvergne-Rhône-Alpes
- Coordinates: 45°44′05″N 3°58′17″E
- Country: France
- Region: Auvergne-Rhône-Alpes
- Department: Loire
- Arrondissement: Montbrison
- Canton: Boën-sur-Lignon
- Intercommunality: CA Loire Forez

Government
  - Mayor (2020–2026): Stéphanie Bouchard
- Area^{1}: 7.43 km^{2} (2.87 sq mi)
- Highest elevation: 689 m (2,260 ft)
- Lowest elevation: 396 m (1,299 ft)
- Population (2023): 997
  - Density: 134/km^{2} (348/sq mi)
- Time zone: UTC+01:00 (CET)
  - Summer (DST): UTC+02:00 (CEST)
- INSEE/Postal code: 42195 /42890
- ^{1} French Land Register data, which excludes lakes, ponds, glaciers > 1 km^{2} (0.386 sq mi or 247 acres) and river estuaries.

Sail-sous-Couzan (French pronunciation: [saj su kuzɑ̃]) is a commune in the Loire department in central France.

== Geography ==
The river Lignon du Forez flows through the commune.

== Population ==
Historical population
Year	Pop.	±% p.a.
1968	1,544	—
1975	1,420	−1.19%
1982	1,294	−1.32%
1990	1,068	−2.37%
1999	983	−0.92%
2007	969	−0.18%
2012	946	−0.48%
2017	941	−0.11%
2023	997	+0.97%
Source: INSEE

== Sights ==
- The Château de Couzan is a ruined castle whose construction dates from the 11th to the 14th century. It has been listed as a monument historique by the French Ministry of Culture since 1890.
- 12th-century church, a monument historique since 1928.

== See also ==
- Communes of the Loire department
