= Louis François Perrin de Précy =

French soldier and officer (1742–1820)

Louis François Perrin de Précy COSL
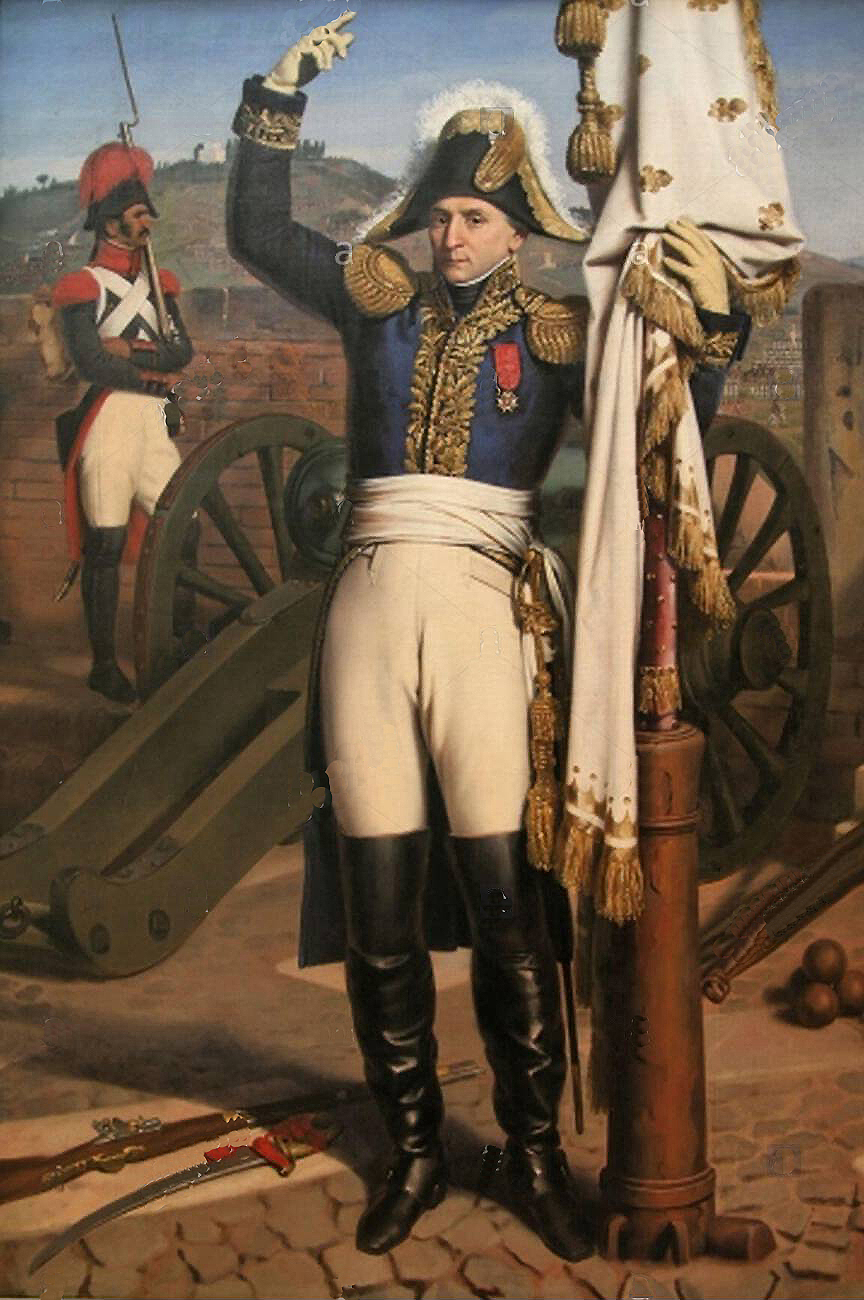
- Portrait by Jean-Joseph Dassy, 1829
- Born: 14 January 1742; Anzy-le-Duc, France
- Died: 25 August 1820 (aged 78); Marcigny, France
- Military career
- Allegiance: Kingdom of France; Kingdom of France
- Branch: (Kingdom of France) French Army
- Rank: Lieutenant General
- Conflicts: Seven Years' War; French Revolutionary Wars; Siege of Lyon
- Awards: Order of Saint Louis

Louis François Perrin, comte de Précy (14 January 1742 – 25 August 1820), was a French nobleman and soldier who lead royalist forces during the Siege of Lyon.

== Early life ==
The Précy family, originally from Dauphiné, migrated to Burgundy in the sixteenth century following the outbreak of the Wars of Religion.

Louis François was born on 14 January 1742 to François Perrin (d. 1748) and his wife Marguerite Marque de Farges (d. 1754). Louis was twelve years old when his mother died and was placed in the care of his uncle, an officer who agreed to take him into the regiment he commanded. Louis went to Valenciennes in 1755 where he learned the profession of a soldier in the Regiment of Picardy.

== Military career ==
Précy was appointed to teach in 1756, and then made lieutenant in 1758. He was sixteen. He participated in the campaigns of Germany (Note: La guerre de Sept Ans (1756-1763) est un conflit majeur du XVIIIe siècle. Elle opposa l'Angleterre et la Prusse d'une part à la France, l'Autriche, la Russie, l'Espagne, la Suède, des princes allemands d'autre part. Le conflit a deux aspects principaux : l'affrontement entre la France et l'Angleterre sur les conquêtes coloniales et l'opposition entre la Prusse et l'Autriche. Le jeu des alliances en fit un conflit mondial. cf Dziembowski Edmond, « la guerre de Sept Ans (1756-1763) », ed. Perrin, 2015, 700p.) from 1756 to 1762. Sub-aide major in 1765, he was appointed captain in 1774. He was in Corsica in 1774 (Note: En 1774, les nationaux corses se révoltent, mais sont très durement réprimés par l'armée française dans la région du Niolo. cf. Caratini Roger, « La Corse, un peuple, une histoire ». ed. Archipel, 2009, 369 p.) under command of Count Narbonne-Fritzlar. He was promoted to lieutenant colonel in 1785, and commanded, in 1788, the Regiment of Vosges. In 1791, King Louis XVI made him lieutenant colonel of his Constitutional Guard, (Note: Le décret du 3 septembre 1791 de l'assemblée constituante accorde au Roi une garde constitutionnelle de 1200 fantassins et de 600 cavaliers.) an ephemeral function since the Guard was dissolved on 29 May 1792. Précy retired to Semur-en-Brionnais.

=== Siege of Lyon ===
In Paris, during the spring of 1793, the Jacobins eliminated the Girondins, while in Lyon the moderates eliminated the Jacobins. The chief of these, Chalier, was guillotined on 16 July 1793. The Convention as a result declared Lyon a city in rebellion, and the decision was made to send an army commanded by François Christophe de Kellermann (replaced in September by François Amédée Doppet) to suppress the insurgency. A delegation from Lyon was dispatched to Semur-en-Brionnais to implore Précy to take command of the royalist forces. He was chosen because the city officials knew him in 1787–1789, when his regiment was garrisoned in Lyon. Précy agreed, quite lucidly from the account of the members of the group who came to him and to whom he answered:

"Have you thought well about the consequences of a war against the Convention? They who can dispose of so many resources against you? Have you thought of the sacrifices of all kinds that you will have to make to support an unequal struggle? What do you know of civil war?"

Précy himself said of the difficulties encountered:

"An immense city, without fortifications, defended by its inhabitants alone, lacking all that is necessary for war, supported a siege of seventy-three days attacked by an implacable enemy, whose leader united all powers and did not fear to use the most odious and destructive means: the fire, the red bullet, the bombardment, treason, slander, perfidy; supported by an army of fifty to sixty thousand men, two-thirds of whom were trained, armed, well provided with food and ammunition of all kind, with a corps of engineers and formidable artillery, a large cavalry – truly all that assures success."

The Convention ordered the bombardment of Lyon on 29 September, the fort of Sainte-Foy fell first, then those of Saint-Irénée and Saint-Just. On the same day, Précy attempted a sortie with a cavalry squadron – the last remaining – and repulsed the Convention Army on the other side of the Mulatiere Bridge. But despite the remarkably fierce resistance of the city, Lyon was taken and the civil authorities capitulated on 9 October 1793. That morning Précy escaped with 1,000 infantry and 200 cavalry. Retreating through Vaize, he fled to Saint-Romain-de-Popey, then Sainte-Agathe-en-Donzy, with most of his force being slaughtered en route. In Lyon, repression led by Couthon, then Collot d'Herbois and Joseph Fouché was severe. The battlements were destroyed and the city was renamed Ville-Affranchie, meaning "freed community"; though it reassumed its original name in October 1794.

General Précy remained hidden among peasants in Beaujolais and Forez until 20 January 1795, finally fleeing to Switzerland.

== Exile ==
While first exiled in Turin, he met Louis Stanislas, Count of Provence, who conferred upon him the rank of maréchal de camp. He would later join him in Verona. Précy returned to Switzerland and in following years rejoined royalist forces combating the Revolution, and involved himself in various actions aimed at promoting the return of the monarchy.

General Précy met with a number of foreign diplomats and traveled to England in 1796, then Vienna, and back to Switzerland. He married on 25 May 1797 in Surce with Jeanne-Marie Chavanne, widow of Perrin de Noailly. Fleeing Switzerland on the approach of the army of the Directory in 1797, he migrated to Überlingen and then to Augsburg, which he departed after the defeat of the Russians. He then found himself in Bayreuth under the protection of the King of Prussia, but at the request of First Consul Napoleon Bonaparte (in fact Fouché) (Note: Extrait du rapport du 8 prairial an IX de Fouché aux consuls : Un comité dont les membres, salariés par l'Angleterre, s'occupent sans cesse des moyens de jeter le trouble dans la république s'est réuni depuis quelque temps à Bayreuth, territoire dépendant de la Prusse. Des agents de ce comité font de fréquents voyages de Bayreuth à Lyon, à Paris, à Londres, à Vienne…. Suit la liste des personnes visées (Précy est en second). Fouché précise « que le ministre des affaires étrangères français doit demander au ministre prussien l'arrestation ». cf. du Lac 1898, p. 308.) he was arrested on 8 July 1801. After peace was negotiated with the United Kingdom in March 1802, Napoleon sought to pacify his relations with the Emigres. On 11 August 1802, Précy was released from prison and spent his final years exiled in Wolfenbüttel, Hamburg, and Altona.

=== Return ===
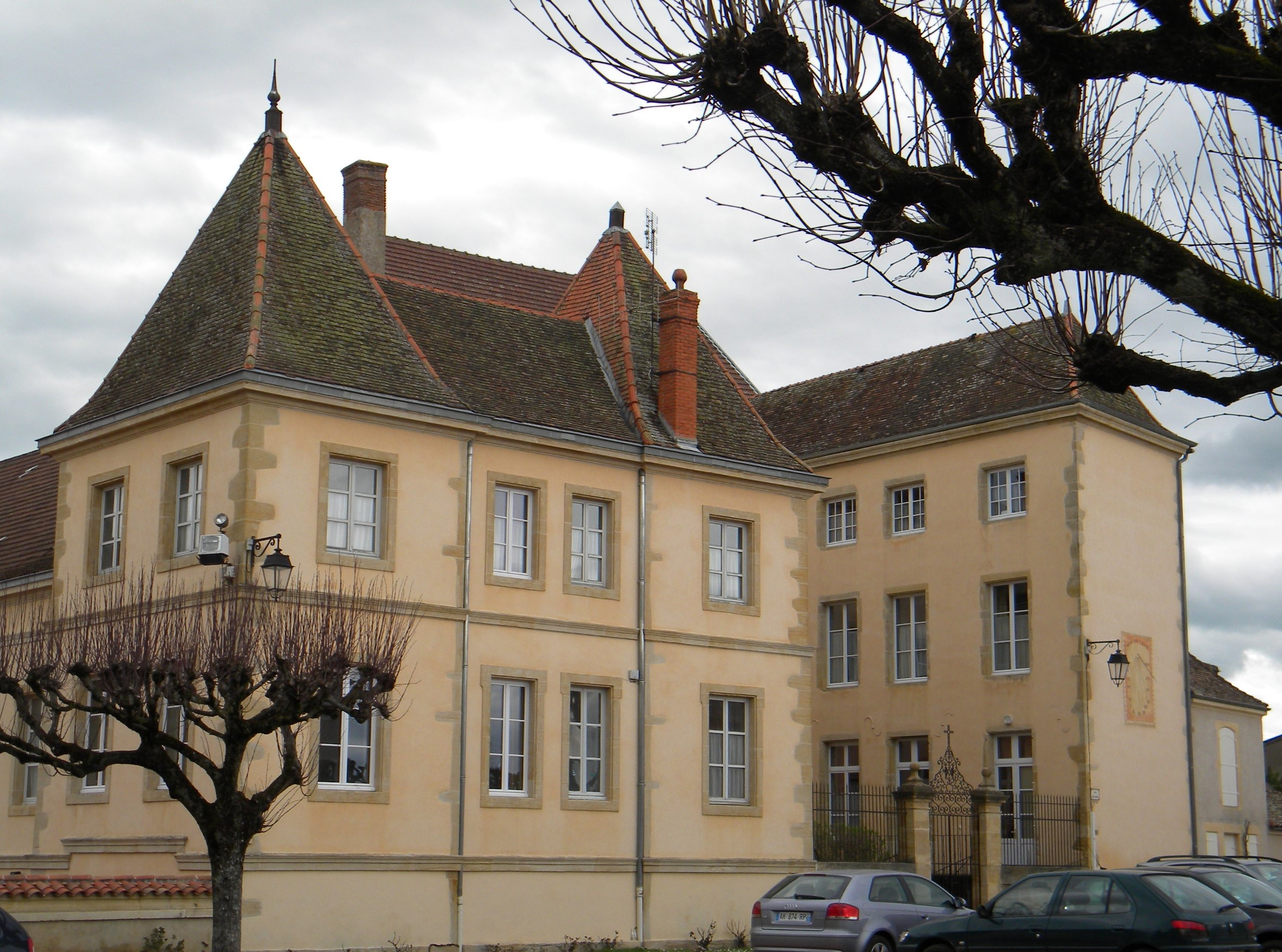
Hôtel de Précy in Semur-en-Brionnais

By Imperial Decree on 30 November 1811, Précy was allowed to return to France, provided that he reside in Dijon. This return was facilitated on 10 June 1812. The couple enjoyed a quiet marriage and the birth of their daughter, and were later allowed to settle in Brionnais. The fall of the First Empire and the return of Louis XVIII led Précy to Paris to offer his services despite being 72 years old.

He received a lieutenant-general's patent on 13 August 1814 and was appointed commander of the National Guard of Lyon. Précy took post and observed the weakness of the Guard but had little time to reform the body before the arrival of Napoleon in Cannes on 1 March 1814. Précy and the civil authorities intended to hinder Napoleon, but upon his arrival in Lyon he passed triumphantly across the Bridge of the Guillotière hailed by the troops of Lyon. When the Imperial Army occupied Paris, Précy was released under stipulation that he retire under supervision to Marcigny.

== Death ==
After the definitive abdication of the Emperor, he did not receive a new command. Précy remained in Marcigny where he died on 25 August 1820.

A monument to the memory of the Siege of Lyon was erected, and the administrators of the monument sent to the Countess of Précy a request for the transfer of the ashes of her husband to Lyon. She accepted and the transfer took place in late September 1821. In Lyon, a religious ceremony took place at St. John's Cathedral:

"The body was received at the entrance of the cathedral by gentlemen of the Chapter of Saint John. During this day of the 27th and that of the next day the whole city visited this funeral chapel ... According to the orders of the Mayor of Lyon, the entrance of the church was draped in black and decorated with the coats of arms of General Précy; All the columns of the vast nave of St. John's were also decorated with mourning drapery, and a catafalque, covered with a rich funeral dais, was placed in the middle of the nave. The civil, military and judicial authorities filled the choir."

== Bibliography ==
- du Lac, René Perrin (1898). Le Général Comte de Précy. Sa vie militaire. Son commandement au siège de Lyon, son émigration (in French). Paris: H. Champion.
- Feller, François-Xavier; Pérennès, François Marie; Pérennès, Jean Baptiste (1834). Biographie universelle, ou Dictionnaire historique des hommes qui se sont fait un nom par leur génie, leurs talents, leurs vertus, leurs erreurs ou leurs crimes (in French). Paris: Gauthier.
