= Lignon du Forez =

River in France

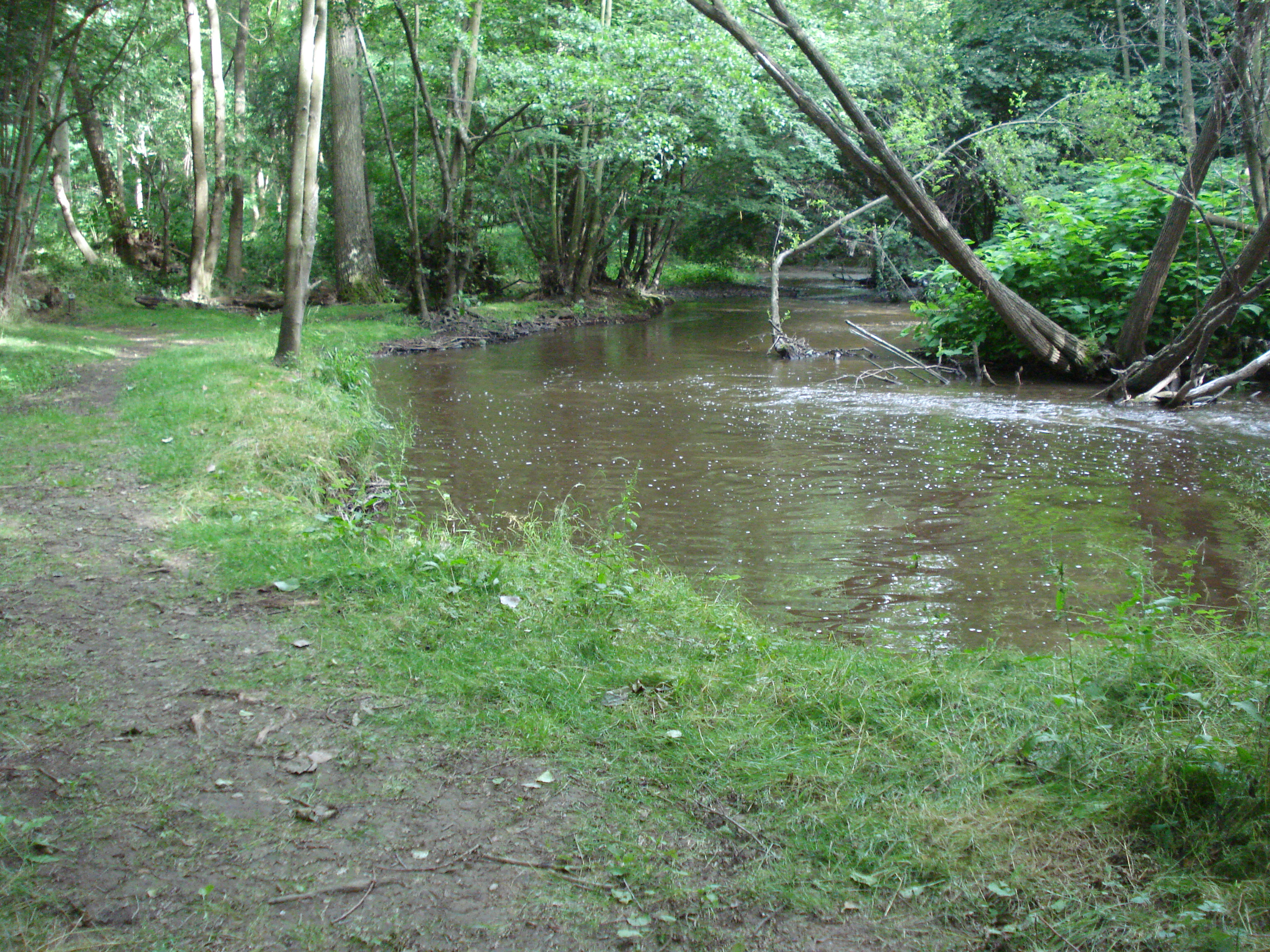
- Lignon du Forez

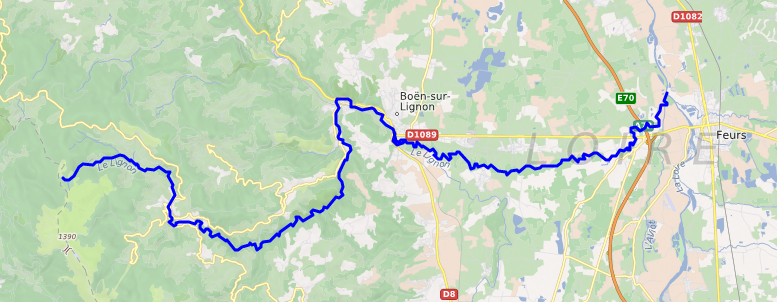

Location
- Country: France

Physical characteristics
- Source
  - location: Chalmazel
  - coordinates: 45°39′56″N 03°47′58″E
  - elevation: 1,490 m (4,890 ft)
- Mouth
  - location: Loire
  - coordinates: 45°45′29″N 04°11′40″E
  - elevation: 320 m (1,050 ft)
- Length: 58.9 km (36.6 mi)
- Basin size: 664 km^{2} (256 sq mi)
- Discharge
  - average: 8.33 m^{3}/s (294 cu ft/s)

Basin features
- Progression: Loire→ Atlantic Ocean

The Lignon du Forez (French pronunciation: [liɲɔ̃ dy fɔʁɛ], literally Lignon of the Forez; also called Lignon de Chalmazel, literally Lignon of Chalmazel) is a 58.9 km (36.6 mi) long river in the Loire department, east-central France. Its source is near Chalmazel. It flows generally east. It is a left tributary of the Loire into which it flows near Feurs.

== Communes along its course ==
This list is ordered from source to mouth:

Chalmazel, Jeansagnière, Sauvain, Saint-Bonnet-le-Courreau, Saint-Georges-en-Couzan, Sail-sous-Couzan, Saint-Sixte, Leigneux, Boën, Trelins, Marcoux, Sainte-Agathe-la-Bouteresse, Montverdun, Saint-Étienne-le-Molard, Poncins, Cleppé, Feurs
