= Rhône-et-Loire =

Former department of France; split into Rhône and Loire departments in 1793

Coordinates: 45°45′N 4°50′E

Rhône-et-Loire was the short-lived department of France whose prefecture (capital) was Lyon. Its name takes into the two rivers which flow through the department: Rhône and Loire.

Created on 4 March 1790, like the other French departments, Rhône-et-Loire was disbanded on 12 August 1793 when it was split into two departments: Rhône (prefecture: Lyon) and Loire (prefecture: Feurs, then Montbrison, and then Saint-Étienne, the current capital). The division of Rhône-et-Loire was a response to counterrevolutionary activities in Lyon which, by population, was the country's second largest city. By splitting Rhône-et-Loire, which was the natural economic and, potentially, military hinterland of Lyon, the government sought to protect the French Revolution from the potential power and influence of the counterrevolutionary revolt in the Lyon region.

== History ==
In the 19th and 20th centuries, the Rhône department was enlarged several times by incorporating into it areas from neighboring departments, so that today the two departments of Rhône and Loire combined are larger than the former Rhône-et-Loire department.

If Rhône-et-Loire still existed, its population at the 1999 French census would have been 1,799,812 inhabitants, whereas in 1999 the Rhône department had 1,578,869 inhabitants, and the Loire department had 728,524 inhabitants.

== See also ==
- Former departments of France
