= Saint-Just (Lyon) =

Coordinates: 45°45′29″N 4°48′47″E

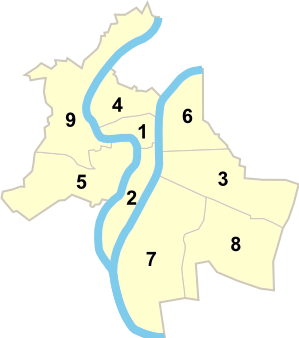
Map of the arrondissements of Lyon with Saint Just in number 5

Saint-Just (pronounced [sɛ̃.ʒy]) is a quarter in the 5th arrondissement of Lyon on the Fourvière hill. Louise of Savoy, the mother of Francis I of France, had her headquarters at the local monastery when Regent.
