= Feurs =

- Commune
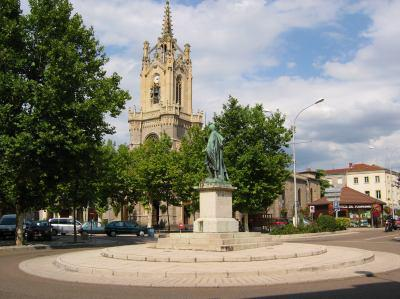
- The church with a statue of Michel Combe, a commander of the French Foreign Legion

- Coat of arms
- Location of Feurs
- Location within France Location within Auvergne-Rhône-Alpes
- Coordinates: 45°44′30″N 4°13′36″E
- Country: France
- Region: Auvergne-Rhône-Alpes
- Department: Loire
- Arrondissement: Montbrison
- Canton: Feurs
- Intercommunality: Forez-Est

Government
  - Mayor (2022–2026): Marianne Darfeuille
- Area^{1}: 24.39 km^{2} (9.42 sq mi)
- Elevation: 345 m (1,132 ft)
- Highest elevation: 366 m (1,201 ft)
- Lowest elevation: 327 m (1,073 ft)
- Population (2023): 8,367
  - Density: 343.1/km^{2} (888.5/sq mi)
- Demonym: Forézien·ne
- Time zone: UTC+01:00 (CET)
  - Summer (DST): UTC+02:00 (CEST)
- INSEE/Postal code: 42094 /42110
- ^{1} French Land Register data, which excludes lakes, ponds, glaciers > 1 km^{2} (0.386 sq mi or 247 acres) and river estuaries.

Feurs (French pronunciation: [fœʁ]; Arpitan: Fuèrs) is a commune in the department of Loire, Auvergne-Rhône-Alpes, France.

== History ==
=== Antiquity ===
The city was founded by the Romans. The name Feurs is a contraction of Forum Segusiavorum, in reference to the forum of the Gallo-Roman era. Ptolemy indicates that the city was the capital of the Gallic Segusiavi, and it also appears on the Tabula Peutingeriana. By extension, the city gave its name to Forez.

Vestiges of the ancient Roman city are located by the current post office. Archaeologists have unearthed a theater, sewers, milestones, inscriptions, statuettes and pottery that reflect the importance of the Roman town, which was located near major Roman roads.

=== Middle Ages ===
A church dedicated to St. Baudile is reported in 960. A second dedicated to the Virgin Mary appears in the texts in 1001. A Castle in Feurs is reported in 1246. In the Middle Ages, the city had no bridge over the Loire but there was a harbor (953) and another close to Randans (1060).

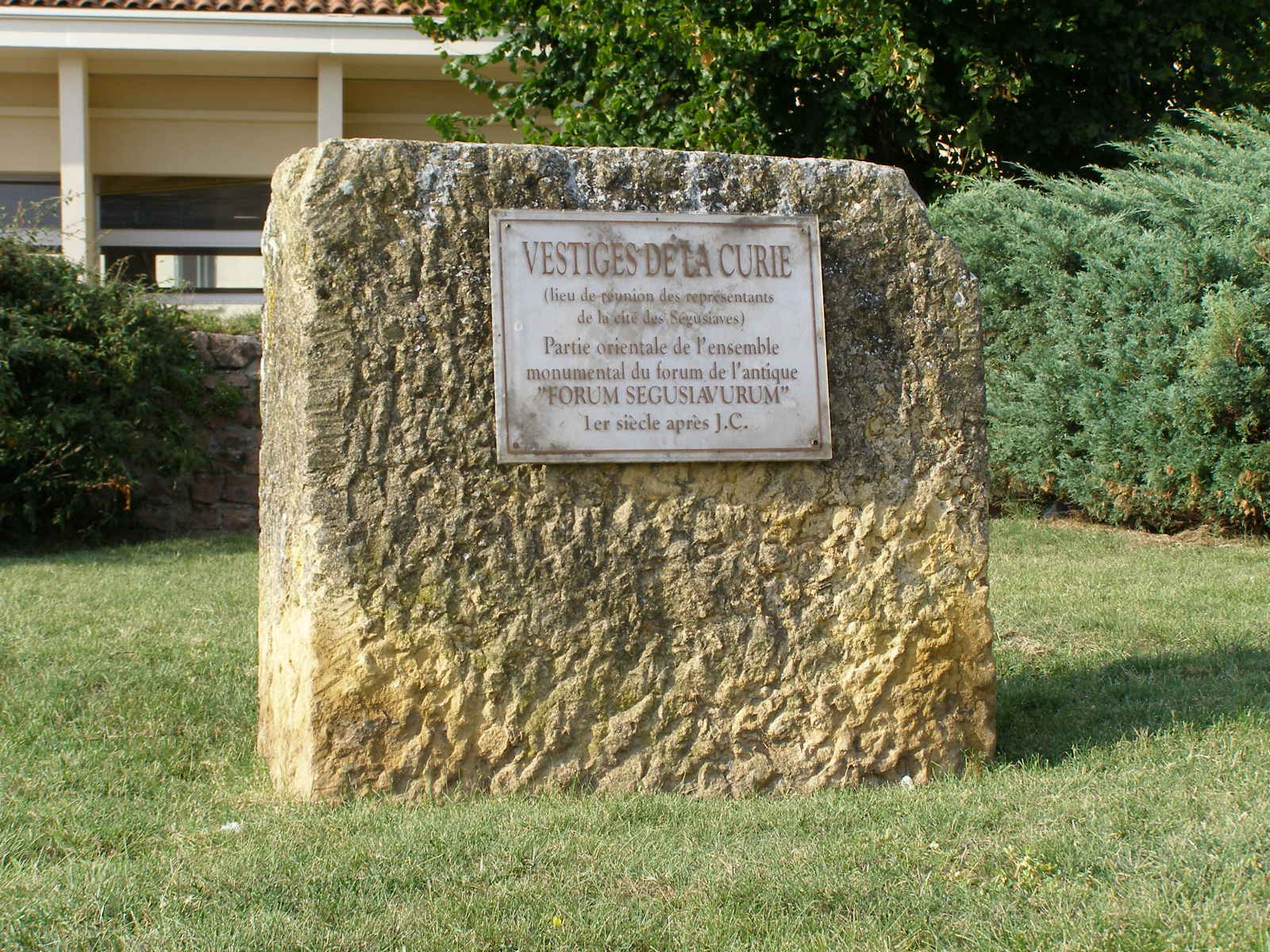
Remains of Roman Feurs

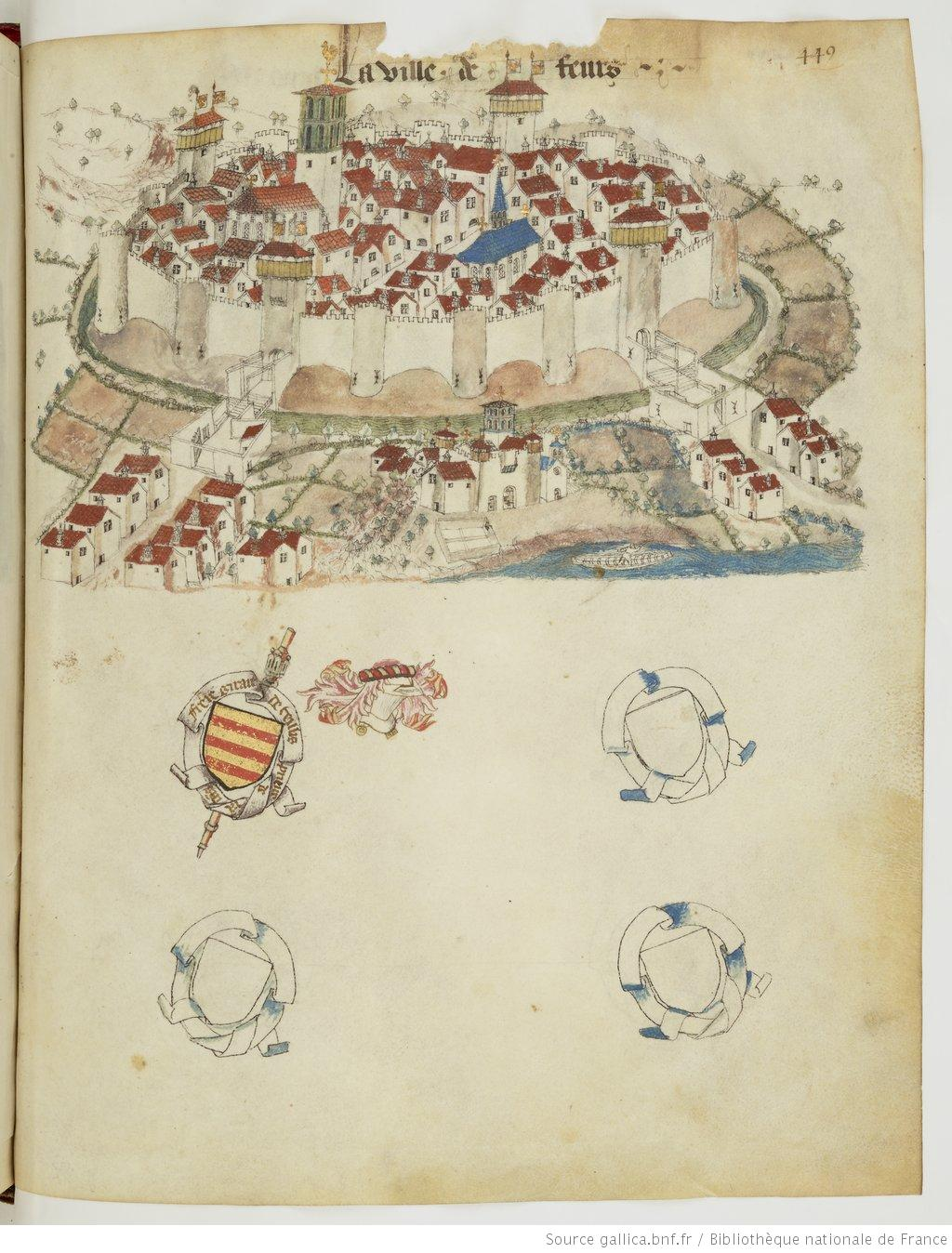
Feurs in the 1400s

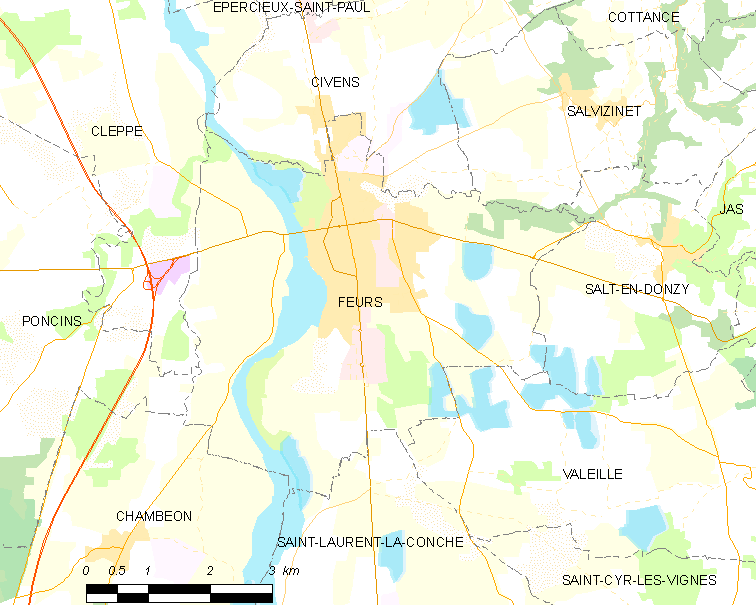
Map of Feurs

=== Early modern age ===
Feurs with the Forez County is forfeited to the Constable of Bourbon along with his other possessions in 1523. It finally enters the royal domain in 1531. In 1542, the city is attached to the generality of Lyon, created by Henry II.

=== French Revolution ===
The French Revolution was very active in the town and the horrors of the guillotine marked its inhabitants. During the Revolution, the Revolutionary Court headed by Claude Javogues made many victims. The 80 victims of the Revolutionary Court were almost all executed at the site of the Chapel of the Martyrs. The chapel of the martyrs was erected later by Mayor Pierre-Marie Assier in 1826. It was for a short time capital of the Loire department in 1793-1795.

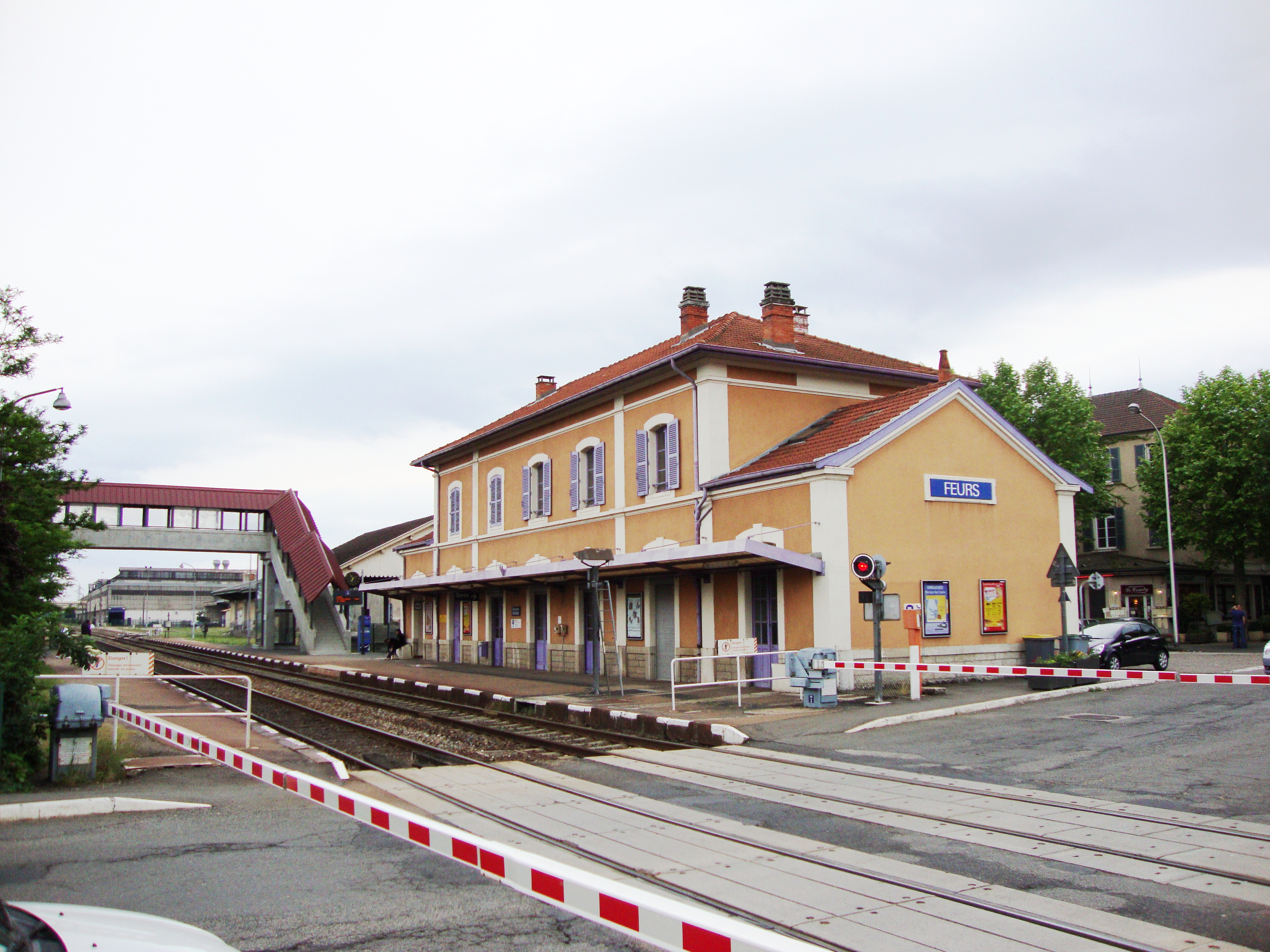
Feurs Railway Station

The town was on one of the first railways: line 3 of France Andrézieux - Roanne opened 1 August 1832 between Saint-Bonnet-les-Oules and Balbigny. This is in Feurs that from this section that are installed the workshops of the company that will build more locomotives under the orders of Régnié engineer.

The sites of archaeological interest are many but all are discovered during the various works in the municipality.

The city gave its name to the Forez province in which it is located.

Feurs was the capital of the Loire department from 1793 to 1795, during the French Revolution.

== Geography ==
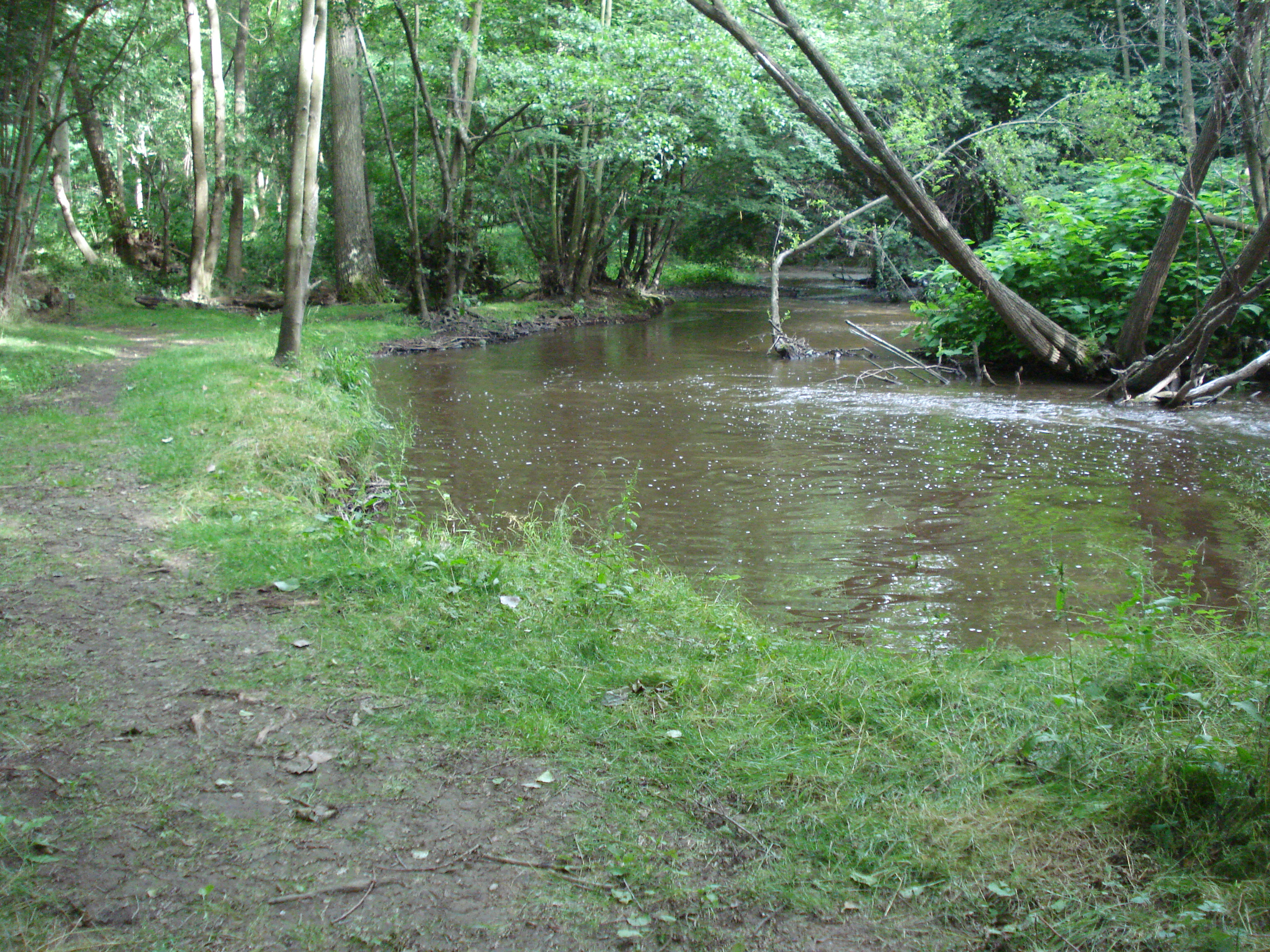
Lignon du Forez River.

The river Lignon du Forez flows into the Loire in the commune.

Feurs is located in the Forez plain, between the Monts du Lyonnais to the East and the Forez mountains to the West.

== Economy ==
Over 300 small and medium enterprises are settled in Feurs and account for about 3200 jobs, distributed as follows: tertiary sector (1675), metal industry (1280), construction (267).

== Leisure ==
The city offers an Olympic-size swimming pool and horse racetracks, as well as playing fields for soccer, rugby and basketball.

Inhabitant from Feurs can also easily access hiking trails towards the "Monts du Forez" or "Monts du Lyonnais".

== Mayors ==
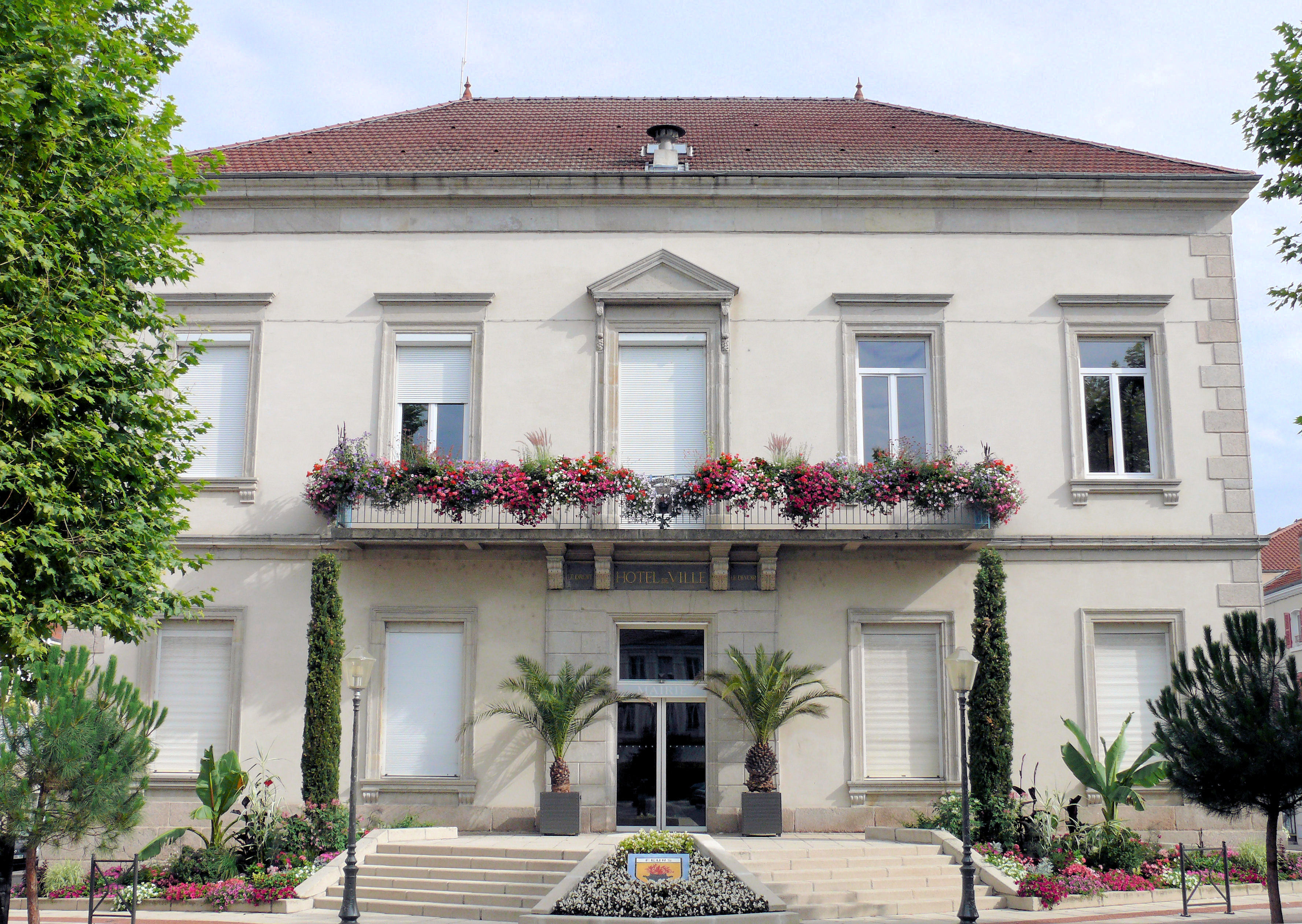
Feurs Hôtel de ville

- 1855 - 1865 Auguste Broutin Parti de l'Ordre
- 1878 - 1881 C Pariat
- 1881 - 1891 Jean-Marie Nigay
- 1891 - 1896 Félix Nigay
- 1896 - 1900 Charles Dorian
- 1900 - 1904 Joseph Ory
- 1904 - 1908 Joannès Mollon
- 1908 - 1912 Joseph Ory
- 1912 - 1940 Antoine Drivet
- 1940 - 1944 Charles Maxime Geny
- 1953 - 1974 Félix Nigay
- 1974 - 1977 Maurice Desplaces
- 1977 - 2001 André Delorme
- 2001 - 2008 Benoît Gardet
- 2008 - 2022 Jean-Pierre Taite
- 2022 - Marianne Darfeuille

== Population ==
Historical population

Year	Pop.	±% p.a.
1793	2,600	—
1800	1,796	−5.15%
1806	1,837	+0.38%
1821	1,937	+0.35%
1831	2,240	+1.46%
1836	2,571	+2.79%
1841	2,646	+0.58%
1846	2,816	+1.25%
1851	2,943	+0.89%
1856	2,894	−0.34%
1861	2,823	−0.50%
1866	3,060	+1.63%
1872	3,048	−0.07%
1876	3,216	+1.35%
1881	3,249	+0.20%
1886	3,451	+1.21%
1891	3,492	+0.24%
1896	3,719	+1.27%
1901	3,766	+0.25%

Year	Pop.	±% p.a.
1906	3,983	+1.13%
1911	3,995	+0.06%
1921	3,956	−0.10%
1926	4,337	+1.86%
1931	4,561	+1.01%
1936	4,759	+0.85%
1946	5,194	+0.88%
1954	5,381	+0.44%
1962	6,272	+1.93%
1968	6,649	+0.98%
1975	8,017	+2.71%
1982	8,012	−0.01%
1990	7,803	−0.33%
1999	7,669	−0.19%
2007	7,376	−0.49%
2012	7,893	+1.36%
2017	8,173	+0.70%
2023	8,367	+0.39%

Source: EHESS and INSEE (1968-2023)

== Landmarks ==
- Museum of Archaeology Assier, 3 rue Victor de Laprade
- The Chapel of the Martyrs, built in memory of the victims guillotined during the Revolution of 1789. People were guillotined and shot there.
- The "font that rains" fountain whose origin is lost in the mists of time. A source of carbonated water is mentioned by Auguste Broutin in his History of the town of Feurs and its surrounding book in the neighborhood of the way of four.
- The Roman Forum instead of the position (remains)
- The Jacquemart church Our Lady of Feurs

== Twin towns ==
Feurs and the town of Olching in Bavaria, Germany, have been twin towns since August 1963, when a delegation of 24 Foréziens, led by the mayor Félix Nigay, visited their German counterparts for the first time.

== Personalities ==
- Joseph-Guichard Du Verney (1648-1730), anatomist
- Franck Montagny, Formula 1 driver

== Climate ==
Climate data for Feurs, elevation 347 m (1,138 ft), (1993–2020 normals, extremes 1993–present)
Month	Jan	Feb	Mar	Apr	May	Jun	Jul	Aug	Sep	Oct	Nov	Dec	Year
Record high °C (°F)	19.3 (66.7)	22.3 (72.1)	26.4 (79.5)	29.8 (85.6)	33.6 (92.5)	39.5 (103.1)	40.7 (105.3)	42.0 (107.6)	35.8 (96.4)	33.1 (91.6)	23.5 (74.3)	19.4 (66.9)	42.0 (107.6)
Mean daily maximum °C (°F)	7.1 (44.8)	9.1 (48.4)	13.5 (56.3)	17.0 (62.6)	21.3 (70.3)	25.2 (77.4)	27.3 (81.1)	27.5 (81.5)	22.7 (72.9)	17.9 (64.2)	11.2 (52.2)	7.9 (46.2)	17.3 (63.1)
Daily mean °C (°F)	3.7 (38.7)	4.7 (40.5)	8.0 (46.4)	11.2 (52.2)	15.3 (59.5)	19.0 (66.2)	20.8 (69.4)	20.7 (69.3)	16.5 (61.7)	12.9 (55.2)	7.4 (45.3)	4.5 (40.1)	12.1 (53.8)
Mean daily minimum °C (°F)	0.2 (32.4)	0.3 (32.5)	2.5 (36.5)	5.3 (41.5)	9.4 (48.9)	12.9 (55.2)	14.4 (57.9)	14.0 (57.2)	10.4 (50.7)	8.0 (46.4)	3.6 (38.5)	1.1 (34.0)	6.8 (44.2)
Record low °C (°F)	−13.8 (7.2)	−15.4 (4.3)	−13.5 (7.7)	−6.3 (20.7)	−1.1 (30.0)	3.5 (38.3)	5.7 (42.3)	3.3 (37.9)	−0.3 (31.5)	−7.8 (18.0)	−10.2 (13.6)	−12.7 (9.1)	−15.4 (4.3)
Average precipitation mm (inches)	33.2 (1.31)	27.9 (1.10)	29.3 (1.15)	47.5 (1.87)	76.1 (3.00)	64.6 (2.54)	70.2 (2.76)	68.6 (2.70)	58.2 (2.29)	71.6 (2.82)	66.5 (2.62)	36.6 (1.44)	650.3 (25.60)
Average precipitation days (≥ 1.0 mm)	7.9	7.6	7.0	8.4	10.6	8.0	7.9	7.5	7.4	9.3	8.9	7.9	98.4
Source: Meteociel

== See also ==
- Communes of the Loire department
