= Chalmazel Ski Resort =

Winter sports resort in Auvergne-Rhône-Alpes, France

Coordinates: 45.677°N 3.825°E

Chalmazel
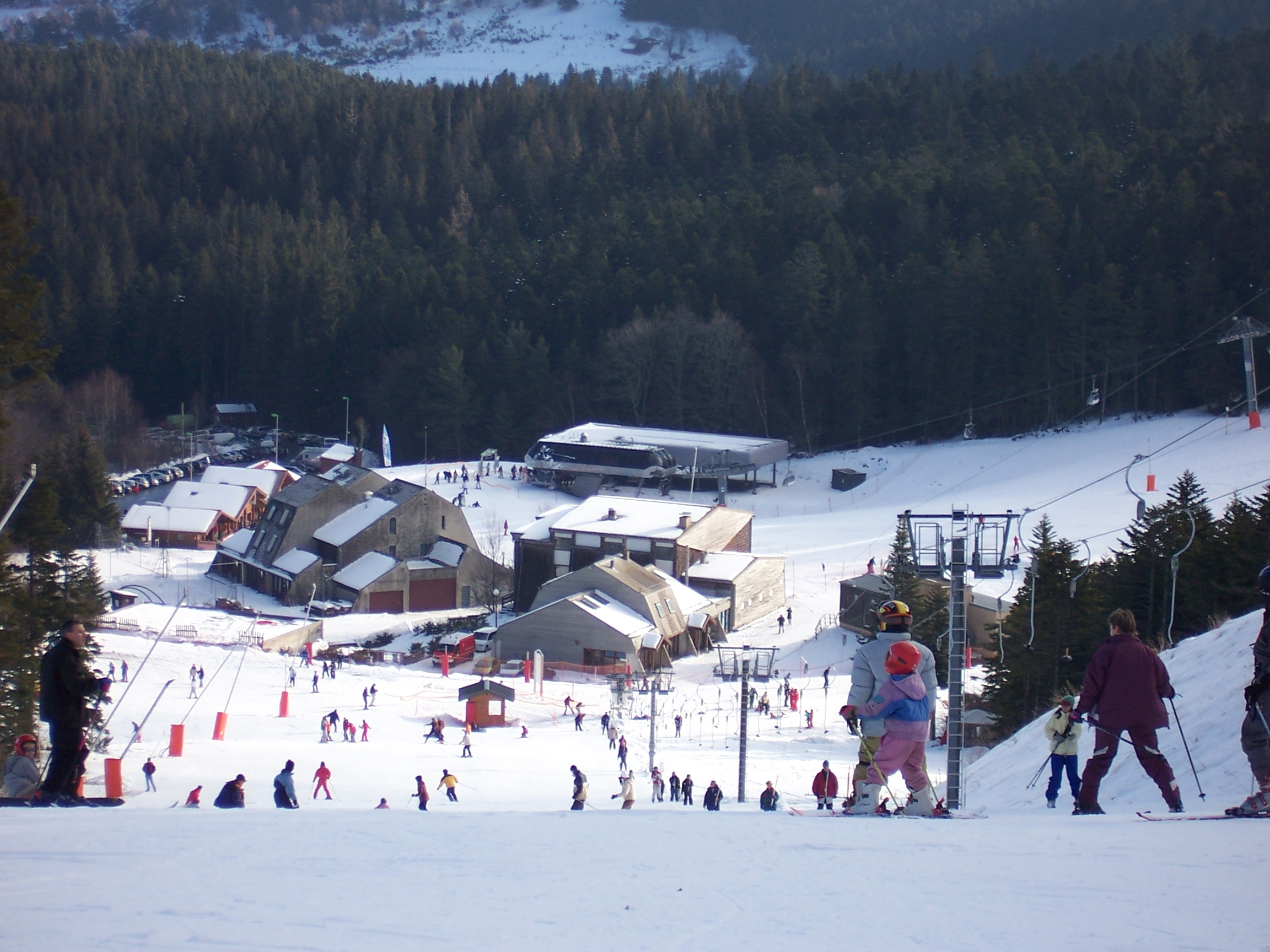
- Interactive map of Chalmazel
- Location: Loire, France
- Nearest city: Saint-Étienne, France (90km)
- Vertical: 530 m (1,740 ft)
- Top elevation: 1 634m
- Base elevation: 1 110m
- Trails: Black: 2 Red: 6 Blue: 6 Green: 2
- Lift system: Chairlifts: 1 Drag Lifts: 7
- Terrain parks: Snowpark
- Snowmaking: 40% (Snow cannons)
- Website: www.loire-chalmazel.com

Chalmazel or Chalmazel – Pierre-sur-Haute is a winter sports resort located in the Massif Central, within the commune of Chalmazel-Jeansagnière in the Loire department of the Auvergne-Rhône-Alpes region. Its alpine ski area stretches from 1,109 to 1,600 meters above sea level on the slopes of Pierre-sur-Haute, the highest point of the Monts du Forez (1,634 meters), between the forest and the wild high moors (les hautes Chaumes).

The first pistes were laid out in the 1930s, and the first lift was built in 1953 on the initiative of the local ski club. Today, the site boasts 12 kilometers of downhill ski runs served by one detachable bubble chairlift, seven drag lifts, and equipped with 90 snow guns. There's also cross-country skiing on the Haut Forez Nordic ski area at Col de la Loge, and snowkiting on the high altitude bare plateaus. In the summer, Chalmazel offers a variety of activities, including downhill karts and scooters, mountain bike trails with acrobatic modules, and hiking from both the resort and the chairlift arrival point.

Chalmazel mainly attracts daily visitors from the Forez plain, as well as from the Roanne and St. Etienne conurbations, all within 80 kilometers. It also receives some visitors from Clermont-Ferrand and Lyon.

== Geography ==
=== Situation ===
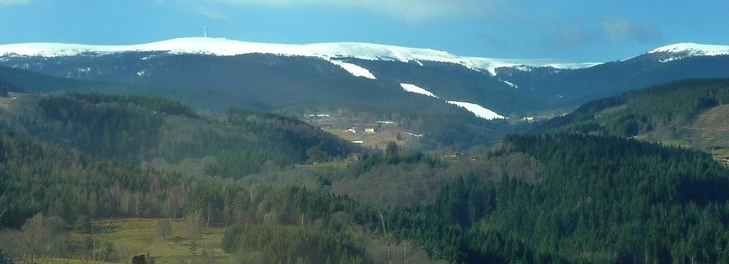
Chalmazel ski area on the slopes of Pierre-sur-Haute, the highest point in the Monts du Forez (1,634 m).

The ski resort of the commune of Chalmazel-Jeansagnière is located at an altitude of 1,120 meters, at a place called Les Bois, 4 kilometers as the crow flies from the village 250 meters below. The station is linked to the village by the 6-kilometer-long route départementale no. 632, and is served by line 112 of the Transports interurbains de la Loire (TIL) from Montbrison. It is a 1-hour, 15-minute drive from Saint-Étienne, Clermont-Ferrand, and Roanne and, since the opening of the A89 autoroute, a 1-hour, 30-minute drive from Lyon.

It is the only downhill ski resort in the Monts du Forez, a mountain range in the Massif Central to the northwest of Saint-Étienne. The range overlooks the Forez plain (to the east) and the Dore valley (to the west), and marks the boundary between the departments of Loire (formerly Rhône-Alpes) and Puy-de-Dôme (formerly Auvergne), both now part of the same Auvergne-Rhône-Alpes region.

At an altitude of 1,634 metres, Pierre-sur-Haute, the highest point in the ski area, is the summit of the massif and of the Loire department. Its summit is home to a military radio station, civil aviation radar, and civilian communications facilities, visible from the surrounding plains and valleys. On clear days, one can see Mont Blanc in the distance, the Plomb du Cantal, the Monts Dore, and the Puy de Dôme.

The Lignon, a 58.1 kilometer-long left-bank tributary of the Loire River, flows through the estate. The river rises on the estate, between Pierre-sur-Haute and the Signal de Procher (1,544 m), below the Col de la Chamboîte.

=== Fauna and flora ===
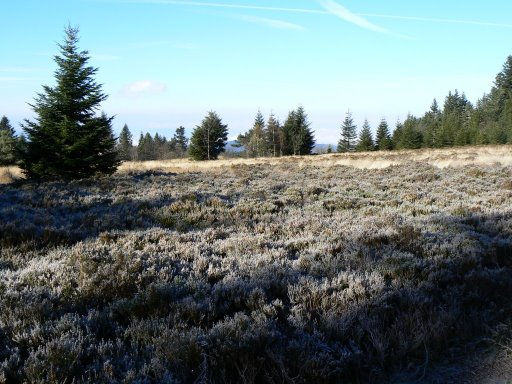
Hautes Chaumes moor.

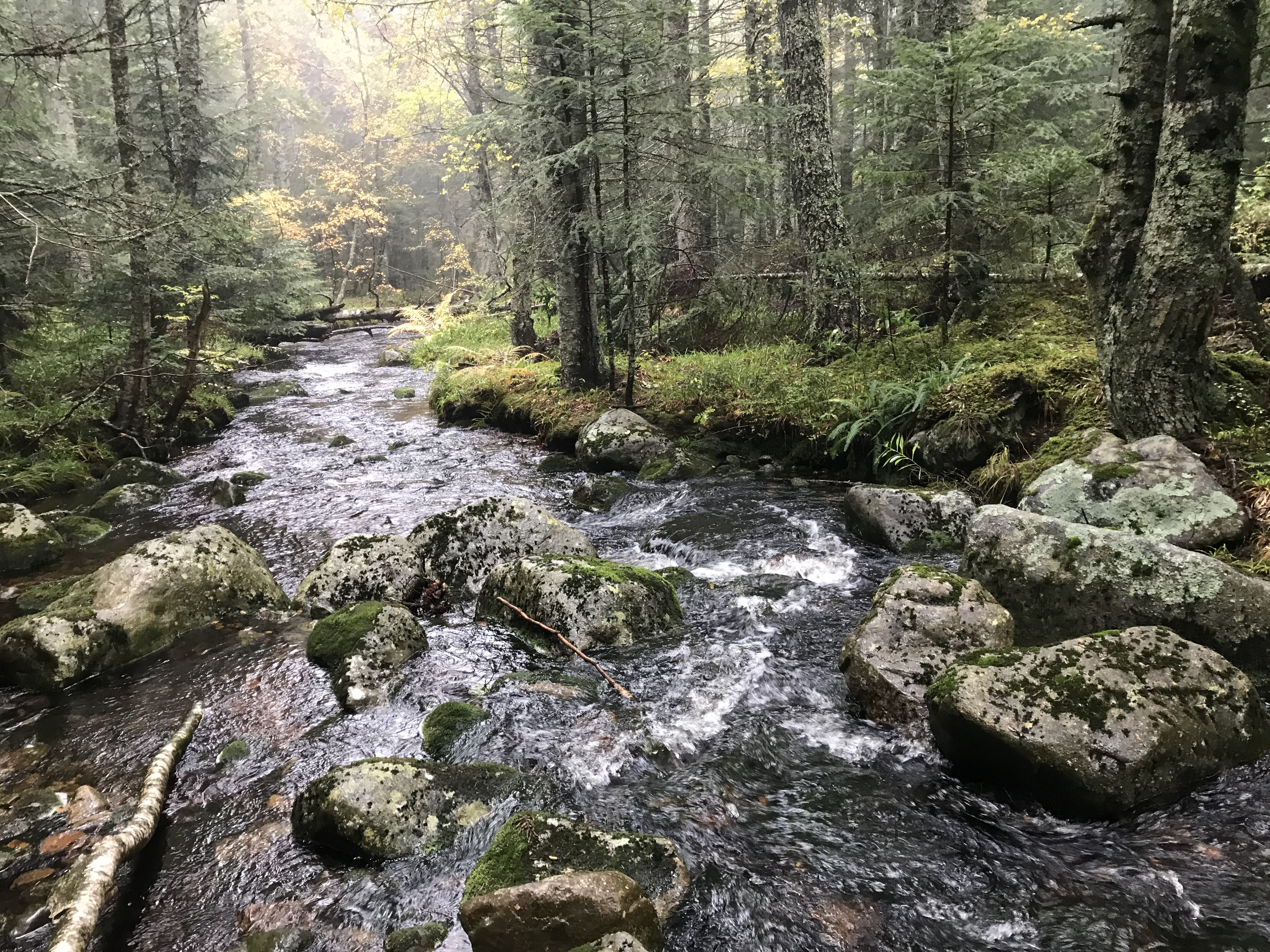
Ruisseau de la Morte at Chalmazel.

The area around Chalmazel is a diverse natural environment, with a marked layering of different biotopes. The lower, montane level is made up of relatively dense pine, beech, and fir forests, which give way, above 1,400 meters, to vast high plateaus: the Hautes Chaumes. This sub-alpine heath is made up of moorland dotted with peat bogs. Some of these herbaceous plateaus are grazed, allowing a mixture of grasses, wavy hair-grass, fescues, and shrubs (callune, bilberry, hairy broom, lycopods). Peat bogs offer a floristic diversity of particular interest, with podium-leaved andromeda mingling with sphagnum moss, cranberry, and marsh cinquefoil. Carnivorous plants such as large-flowered butterwort and sedges are also present.

Pastoral activities, along with the maintenance of the resort's trails, play a crucial role in preserving biodiversity. A small population of Diphasiastrum tristachyum, a rare species protected at national-level and listed in France's Red Book of Threatened Flora, has been identified on the slopes of Couzan. The management of ski slopes is carried out with care to avoid ground-level grinding, which helps preserve the host habitat and prevent the spread of callune.

The Couzan and Chapouilloux woods are home to the black woodpecker, Europe's largest woodpecker, as well as the common raven and, to a lesser extent, the woodcock.

Due to this ecological diversity, the areas surrounding the resort are classified as a natural zone of ecological, faunistic and floristic interest, with the hautes Chaumes designated as a Natura 2000 site, which restricts the expansion of the ski area.

=== Weather ===
The climate of the Monts du Forez is characterized by the presence of the burle, a northerly wind that forms large snowdrifts and explains the absence of vegetation on the summit plateaus, as well as frequent fog (132 days a year) that causes frost. The resort of Chalmazel has dealt with this situation by developing its ski area mainly in the forest, which provides natural protection against the weather, and by installing snow barriers on exposed summits. The vehicles on the Jasseries chairlift are equipped with a liquid shock absorber system to limit the effects of wind.

Annual rainfall at Pierre-sur-Haute is over 1,500 millimetres, and remains stable throughout the year, unlike at the lower points of the massif, where winters are drier. At the summit, the average number of days per year, when the temperature is negative, is close to 200, with more than 100 days without thaw and an annual period of natural snow cover enabling skiing of between 70 and 80 days. Autumn remains mild, and winter generally overlaps with spring: April is harsher than November. Rainfall episodes can be intense, but remain random, particularly in the valleys. As a result, the date of the first snowfall fluctuates widely. On the other hand, the cold climate and the presence of the Lignon river enable the resort to produce artificial snow to ensure the opening of the ski area in December.

== History ==
=== Toponymy ===
The resort takes its name from the former commune of Chalmazel, where it is located. This name derives directly from the former name of the highest point of the massif, now called Pierre-sur-Haute, known before the 18th century as Chal, derived from the prelatin "calma" (meaning thatch) bare plateau at altitude. Added to this is mazel, from the Latin "man(s)um" (mazet, mas, manse, maison), the substantival past participle of the verb "manere" (to dwell).

=== Organized skiing at Chalmazel ===
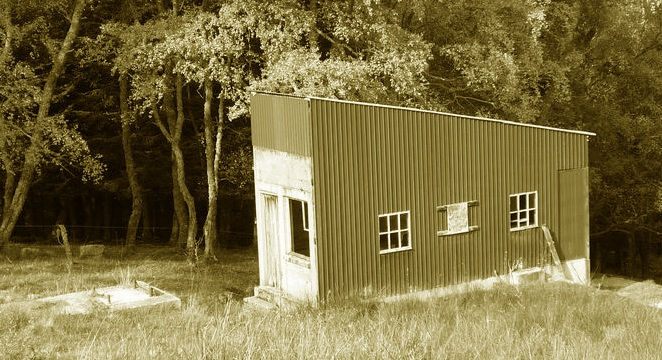
Chapouilloux ski lift departure station.

The history of skiing in Chalmazel dates back to the 1934–1935 winter season, when the Ski Club Roannais built the first downhill run, known as piste "A", on the slopes of the Chapouilloux woods. In 1936, the Chalmazel school launched the first school ski days. In 1939, the Forez-Velay-Vivarais Ski Federation organized a major regional competition, with downhill, slalom, combined and jumping events, attracting over 1,500 spectators.

After World War II, in 1946, three local ski enthusiasts—Émile Doitrand, René Morel, and Fernand Bost—founded the Ski Club Chalmazellois. This association was instrumental in the construction of the first lift in 1953: the 605-meter-long Chapouilloux cable car. In 1959, three members of the Thiers ski-club initiated the construction of the Chalmazel 1500 ski lift on the high stubble below the Signal de Procher, accessible from the Col du Béal. A training lift, La Parre (or La Part), was installed in 1964 not far from the Chapouilloux lift. All these pioneering ski lifts in the Monts du Forez have now been dismantled. It was also in 1964 that a more ambitious project took shape, under the impetus of Eloi Marcoux, president of the Ski Club: the development of new downhill ski runs on the slopes of Pierre-sur-Haute, with the installation by the commune of the Granges ski lift, which to this day remains the longest ski lift in the Massif Central.

=== Structuring and development ===
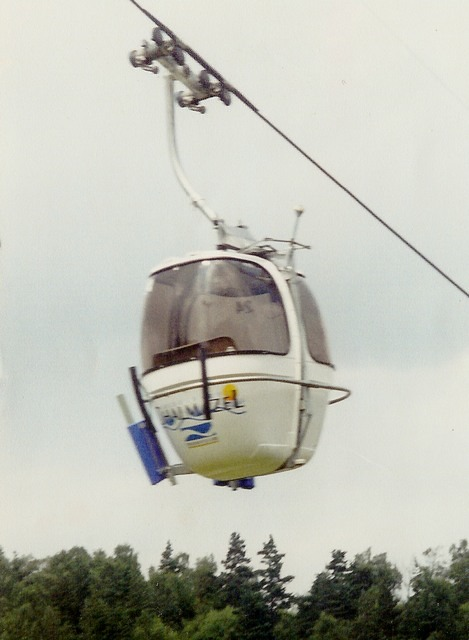
The Pierre-sur-Haute cable car.

The resort continued to develop in 1967, led by Eloi Marcoux, who, in addition to his role as president of the Ski-club, was now also the facilities manager, and Henri Essertel, general secretary of the commune of Montbrison and the Régie de Chalmazel. They had the support of the Conseil Général and its president, Antoine Pinay, who wanted to provide the department with a modern ski center. The lift park was developed, pistes were laid out and a snow front with reception, rental stores, and apartments was built. The Pierre-sur-Haute four-seater gondola was built, forming the backbone of the resort at 2,340 meters. This lift was one of the first "egg" lines built by French manufacturer Poma. Additionally, the ski school lift was installed in 1967 on the Granges flat, accessible to beginners from the gondola's intermediate station. After a few seasons, it was relocated to its final position at the foot of the slopes near the gondola departure station, subsequently renamed the Bosquet ski lift. It was replaced in 1993 by the 400-meter-long Forestière lift, now also dismantled.

In 1980, the Couzan black run was constructed, and a new pathway was cleared through the forest on the slopes of the Signal de Procher, intended to facilitate the opening of a new piste. However, this project was never completed. Although naturally reforested over the years, the gap on the side of the Signal de Procher remains visible today.

In 1983, the resort installed snow guns on the Granges piste and created a small beginners' area behind Les Épilobes restaurant, also equipped with snow guns.

=== Modernization policy ===
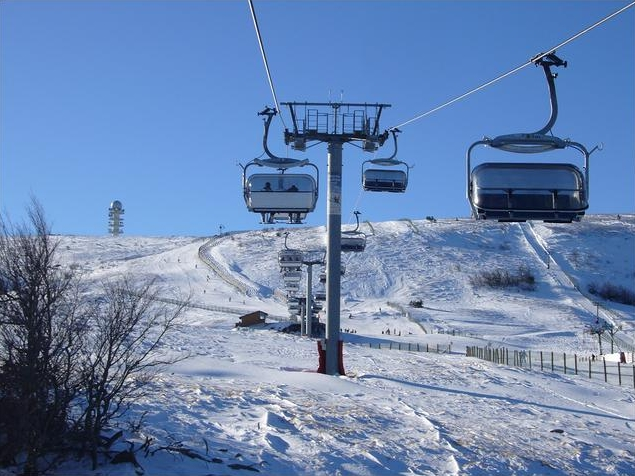
The Jasseries bubble chairlift.

In the 2000s, the Departmental Council of Loire took over management of the ski area and invested in new facilities.

In 2002, the gondola lift, now obsolete and insufficient in terms of throughput, was replaced by the Jasseries detachable bubble chairlift, at a cost of 3,600,000 euros excluding tax (excluding dismantling, civil engineering, and project management). It was followed by the Pierre-sur-Haute ski lift, which extended the high-altitude runs to the summit of the massif.

Investments continued in 2004 with the renovation of the beginners' area. The Campanules slope was created, and snow guns and two new surface lifts were installed.

In 2003, the Couzan ski lift was modernized, followed in 2006 by the Granges ski lift. This was followed in 2008 by the replacement of the Cimes lift, which serves the upper Couzan sector and the more technical runs. The lift now has a longer layout to facilitate access to the Chamboîte piste and the black runs. This work was accompanied by the installation of 20 snow guns in the Couzan sector.

=== Downhill skiing ===
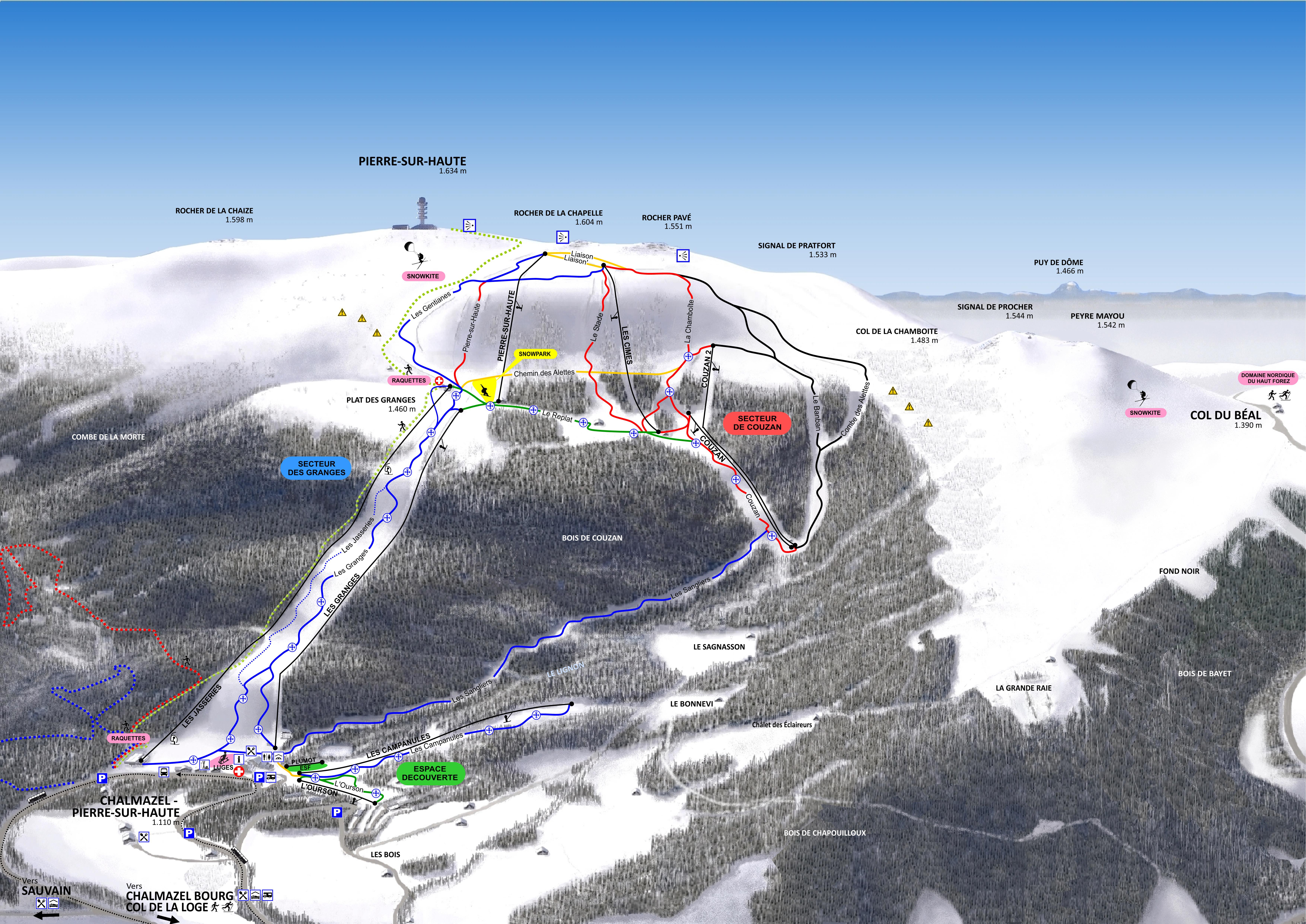
Trail map.

The alpine ski area extends from 1,109 meters to 1,600 meters in altitude on the eastern side of Pierre-sur-Haute. Chalmazel's skiing offerings are primarily family-oriented, featuring highlights such as the 2,800-meter Granges piste, the trails at the foot of Pierre-sur-Haute, the more technical Couzan sector, and a dedicated beginners' area. Although the ski area is modest in size, encompassing 11 kilometers of trails, this is due to the recent classification of certain forested regions. Nevertheless, the Conseil général de la Loire focuses on quality, implementing measures such as sodding, installing snow barriers on bare sections, and using 90 snow guns to ensure the slopes remain open. The ski area is well-served by a modern fleet of ski lifts.

=== Technical equipment ===
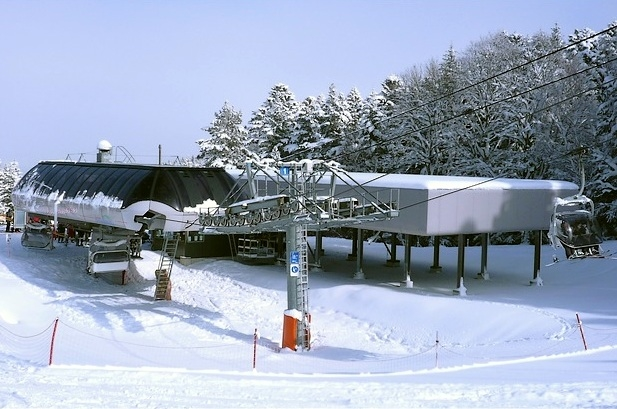
Jasseries chairlift station.

Since 2002, almost 90% of the ski area's lifts have been built, replaced or renovated.

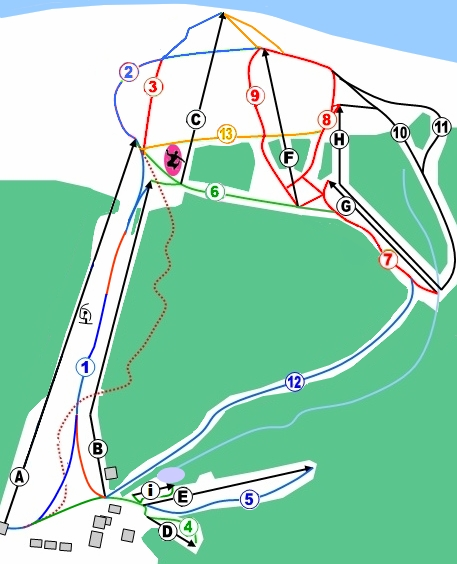
Schematic plan of the domain.

The resort is equipped with the Jasseries (A) detachable bubble chairlift. Built by Leitner in 2002, it is the backbone of the resort. Its four-seater chairs are fitted with a polycarbonate hood to protect passengers from the elements, and a liquid shock absorber to limit rocking, allowing operation even in poor weather conditions. They are fitted with removable clamps, enabling line operation at 5 meters per second and slowing down in the station to facilitate boarding. The unit also features a garage for off-season or bad-weather vehicle recycling, or for adapting the number of seats on the line to the number of passengers, thus optimizing fuel consumption. With a line length of 2,036 meters, this is the longest chairlift in the Massif Central.

There are also four surface lifts: the Pierre-sur-Haute (C), Campanules (E) and Ourson (D) lifts, installed by Doppelmayr in 2002 and 2004 respectively, and the Cimes (F) lift built by Leitner in 2008. The resort also boasts three detachable Montaz Mautino (or GMM) pole lifts: Les Granges (B) and Couzan 1 (G), renovated in 2006, and Couzan 2 (H), installed in 1986. With a line length of 1,836 meters, Les Granges is the longest ski lift in the Massif Central. A Sunkid travelator for beginners also joined the beginners' area in 2010.

=== The tracks ===
The slopes are divided into three linked sectors, each with a specific ski offering: Les Granges (family skiing), Couzan (more technical skiing), and the beginners' area (learning to ski). The ski area has 15 downhill runs covering 11 kilometers, including 2 black runs, 6 reds, 6 blues, and 1 green.

==== Les Granges sector ====
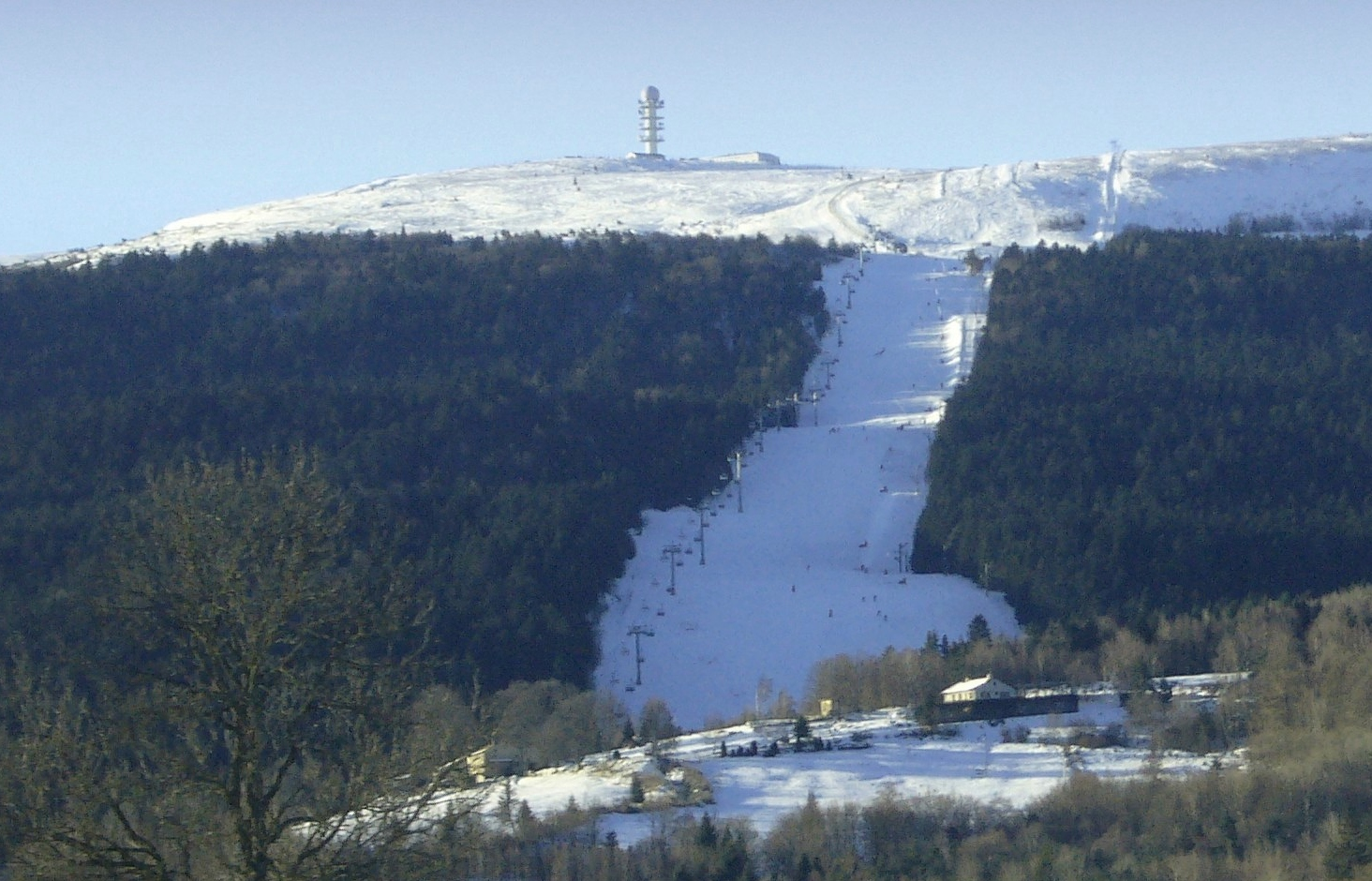
The Granges trail forms a wide gap in the forest.

The Granges piste forms a wide gap in the forest. The Granges sector is the heart of the resort's offering. It runs from the foot of the slopes to the highest point of the resort at 1,600 meters. It offers family skiing on blue and red runs, with descents over 2,800 meters long.

List of trails in the Granges sector
N°.	Name	Difficult	Snow guns	Length	Elevation inclination	Description
1	Les Granges (Les Jasseries)	Blue	Yes	2 050 m	356 m.	The resort's main run, a large toboggan boulevard forming a wide gap in the forest, was initially separated into two runs by fir trees.
2	Les Gentiannes	Blue	–	825 m.	135 m.	Trail on the south side of the summit cap of the Granges wall
3	Pierre-sur-Haute	Red	–	365 m.	135 m.	Trail marked out on the summit cap of the Granges wall
–	Liaison Cimes	Liaison	–	350 m.	15.	Flat connecting path between the finish of the Pierre-sur-Haute ski lift (C) and the finish of the Cimes ski lift (F), leading to the Couzan sector.

==== Discovery area ====
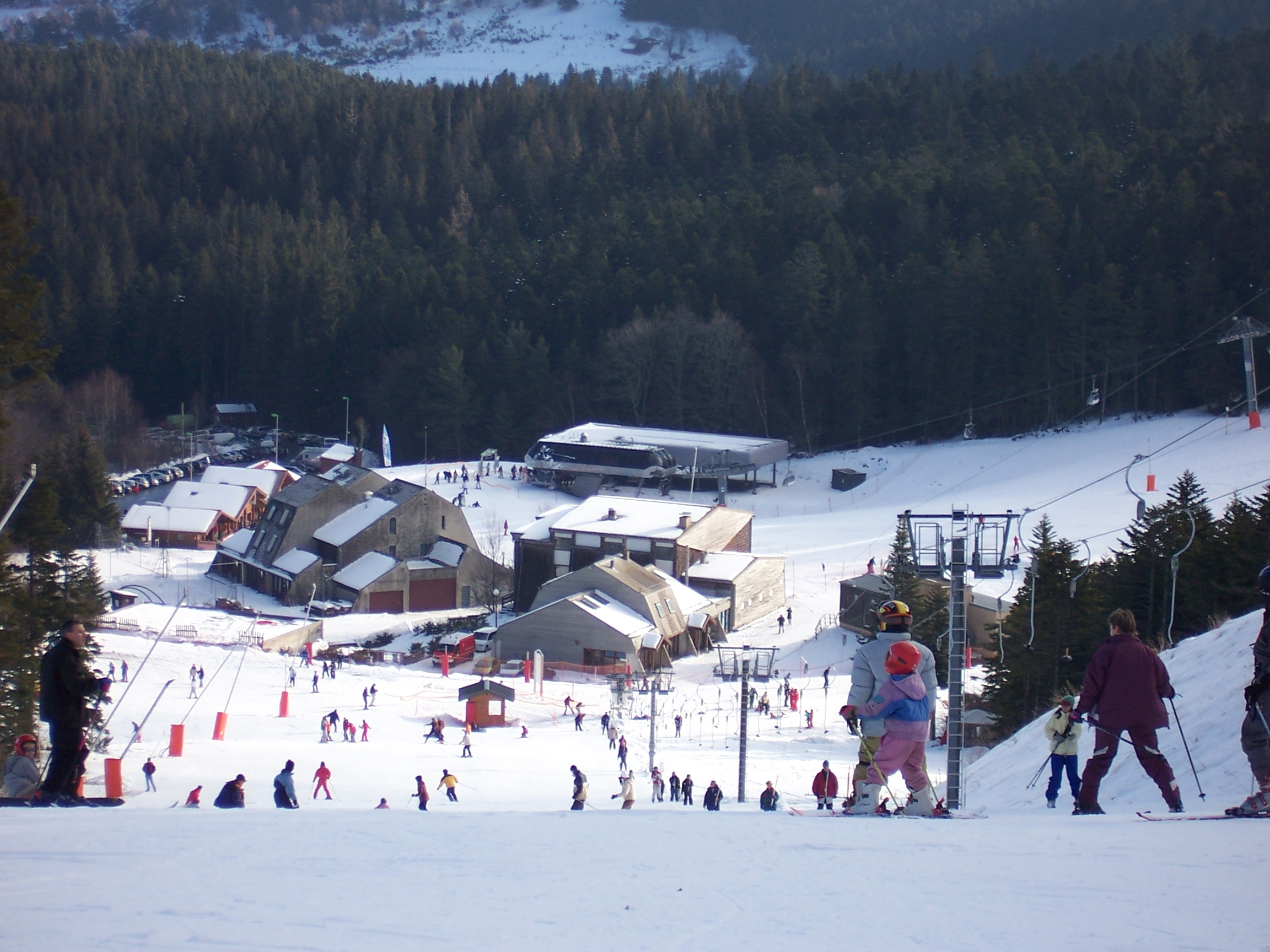
The discovery area, seen from the Campanula trail.

The discovery area is a small beginners' ski area at the foot of the pistes, separated from the main ski area by the Lignon river. It is linked to the main ski area by a groomed access road crossing the river.

List of tracks in the discovery area
N°	Name	Difficult	Snow guns	Length	Elevation inclination	Description
4	L'ourson	Green	Yes	150 m.	21 m.	Chalmazel school runway, also serves the Forestière parking lot and the Granges condominium.
5	Les Campanules	Blue	Yes	450 m.	80 m.	Track for families and beginners
–	Jardin ESF		Yes	40 m.	5 m.	The ski school kindergarten, served by a travelator (i)

==== Couzan sector ====
The Couzan sector is located in the northern part of the resort and runs from the peaks and the Col de la Chamboîte to the foot of the Signal de Procher, in the valley formed at the birth of the Lignon, known as the Creux de Couzan. It has more technically advanced runs (the 2 black runs in the area are in this sector).

List of tracks in the Couzan sector
N°	Name	Difficult	Snow guns	Length	Elevation inclination	Description
6	Le Replat	Green	Yes	516 m.	63 m.	Trail linking Les Granges to the Couzan sector, running through the woods of Plat des Granges
7	Couzan	Red	Yes	620 m.	170 m.	The sector's main track, a wide gap in the forest at the heart of the Couzan hollow.
8	La Chamboîte	Red	Yes (low)	800 m.	173 m.	Trail named after the nearby pass, with a 45% slope on the summit cap
9	Le Stade	Red	–	680 m.	173 m.	Run alongside the Cimes ski lift, with a maximum slope of 46%.
10	Le Banban	Black	–	1 175 m.	292 m.	Technical trail named after the hermit who lived in the forest
11	Combe des Alettes	Black	–	570 m.	140 m.	Technical unpaved trail with a cornice passage that is the steepest route in the area.
12	Chemin des Sangliers	Blue	–	1 710 m.	165 m.	Walking trail to the resort, laid out in the Couzan forest near the Lignon river
13	Chemin des Alettes	Liaison	–	475 m.	10 m.	A flat connecting path leading back to the Granges sector.

== Nordic skiing and snowshoeing ==
=== Haut Forez Nordic ski area ===
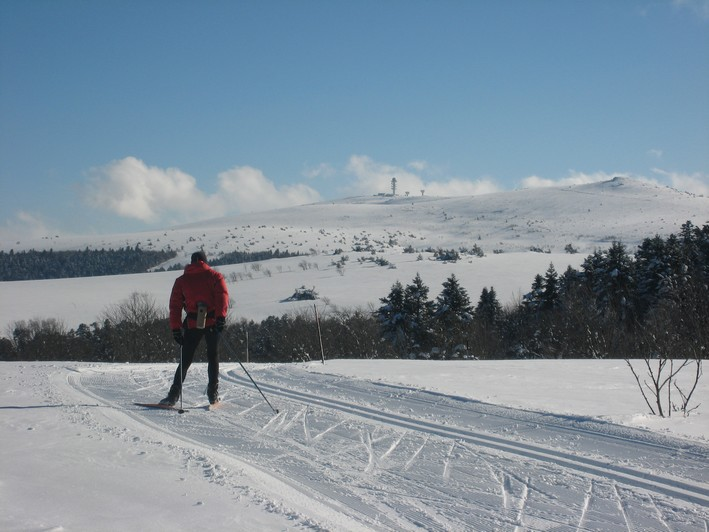
Cross-country skiing at Col de la Loge.

Cross-country skiing is practiced on the Haut Forez Nordic ski area, starting from the Col de la Loge (1,253 meters), 11 kilometers from the village of Chalmazel, or the Col du Béal (1,390 meters), 9 kilometers from the resort. There are 119 kilometers of marked trails at altitudes of between 1,253 and 1,428 meters, between forests and clearings on the crests of the Monts du Forez. The trails are located in the communes of Chalmazel-Jeansagnière, La Chamba, La Chambonie and Saint-Jean-la-Vêtre. The site has been awarded the "Nordique France" label.

Starting from the Col de la Loge, the area offers a 3-kilometer green loop, a 6-kilometer blue loop, two red loops of 9 and 12 kilometers, and two black loops of 15 and 16 kilometers. The Col du Béal departure point offers a 1.5-kilometer green loop, a 5-kilometer blue loop, a 9-kilometer red loop, and a 17-kilometer black loop.

=== Snowshoeing ===
At the resort, three trails (squirrel, deer, and fox trails) of 2.5 to 6 kilometers are marked for snowshoeing.

== New winter sports ==
=== Snowpark ===
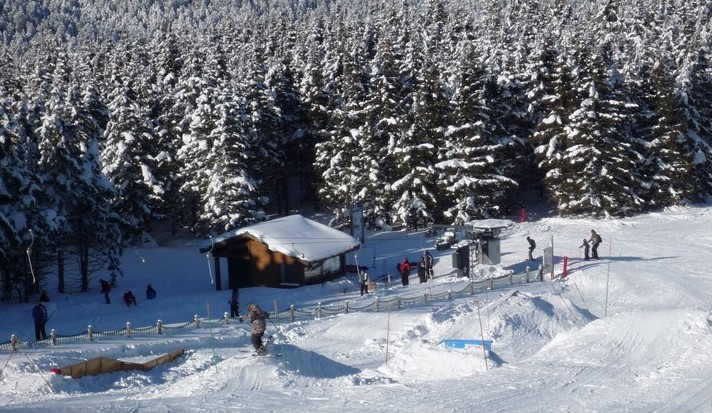
Snowpark at the start of the Pierre-sur-Haute ski lift.

From the February school vacations onwards, weather conditions permitting, the resort constructs a snowpark, typically located next to the Pierre-sur-Haute ski lift. The Chalmazel Snowpark was initiated in 1999 by the Chalmazel Freestyle Crew Association. Since 2012, its management has been taken over by the Forez SnowRide association.

=== Snowkite ===
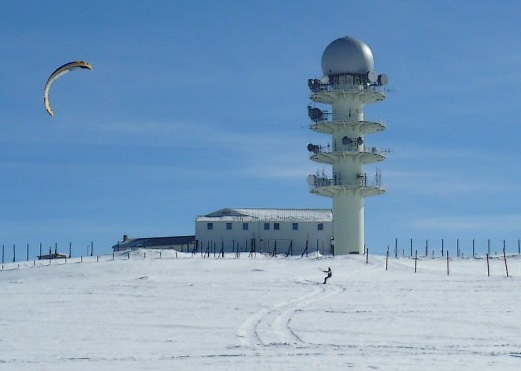
Snowkiting at the summit of Pierre-sur-Haute.

The exposed plateaus on the Chalmazel heights are ideal for snowkiting, thanks to their open, vegetation-free terrain, and their exposure to the burle, a northerly wind that blows in winter in central France to the east of the Massif Central.

Snowkiting is the winter sports equivalent of kitesurfing, where the surfboard is replaced by a snowboard or skis. The crests of the Monts du Forez, from Prabouré to the Col de la Loge, are ideal spots for enthusiasts. Notably, the Col du Béal, situated at an altitude of 1,390 meters on the border between the communes of Chalmazel and Saint-Pierre-la-Bourlhonne, is accessible by road and features a gîte-auberge at the summit. This location, straddling the Loire and Puy-de-Dôme departments in the Auvergne-Rhône-Alpes region, offers excellent conditions for snowkiting.

=== Snowscoot ===
A snowscoot user.

The resort also promotes snowscooting, a winter sport born in the 1990s, inspired by BMX and practiced by gliding over the snow using handlebars on a board, likened to a snow scooter. There has been a club in the Loire since 2007, and all the ski area's lifts and runs are accessible to these machines. In 2013, Chalmazel is one of two French resorts to host the International Snowscoot Open.

== Summer activities ==
=== Hiking, trail walking, and mountain biking ===
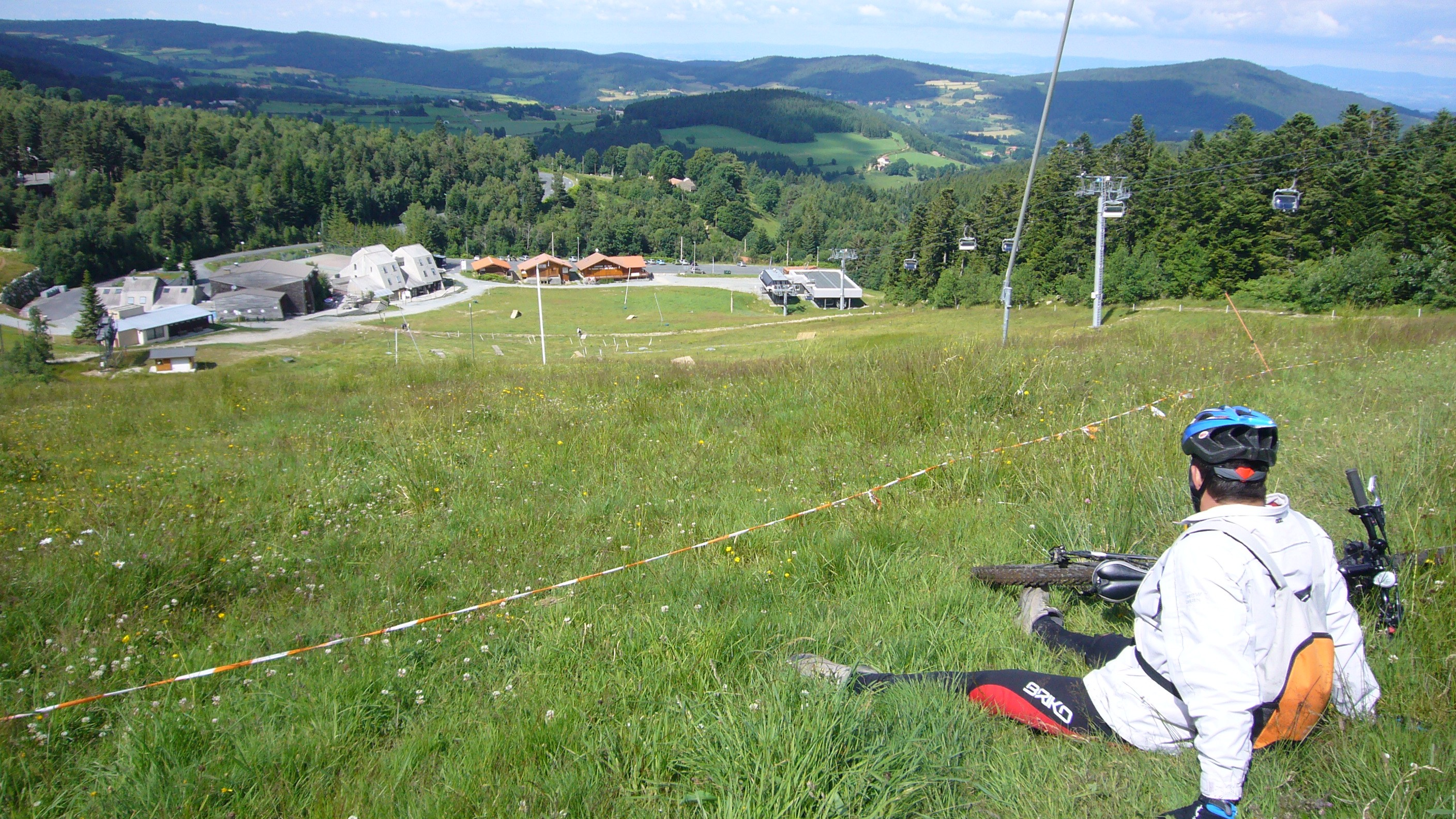
Bikepark and chairlift in summer.

The Jasseries chairlift operates from mid-June to the end of August, transporting walkers and mountain bikers to an altitude of 1,463 meters at the Plat des Granges. From this location, several signposted footpaths provide opportunities for strolls or hikes, particularly to Pierre-sur-Haute, the highest point of the massif. Here, hikers can connect with the GR 3 footpath, France's first designated long-distance hiking trail, which follows the ridge line from the summit to the Col du Béal and Col de la Loge, offering panoramic views over the Auvergne region to the west and the Rhône-Alpes region to the east. The trail also allows you to discover the jasseries, age-old stone farmhouses with thatched roofs, and red tiles where the Fourme de Montbrison were made.

Several trail circuits have been marked out, and a race called Chalmatrail has been held every July since 2013.

=== Road cycling ===
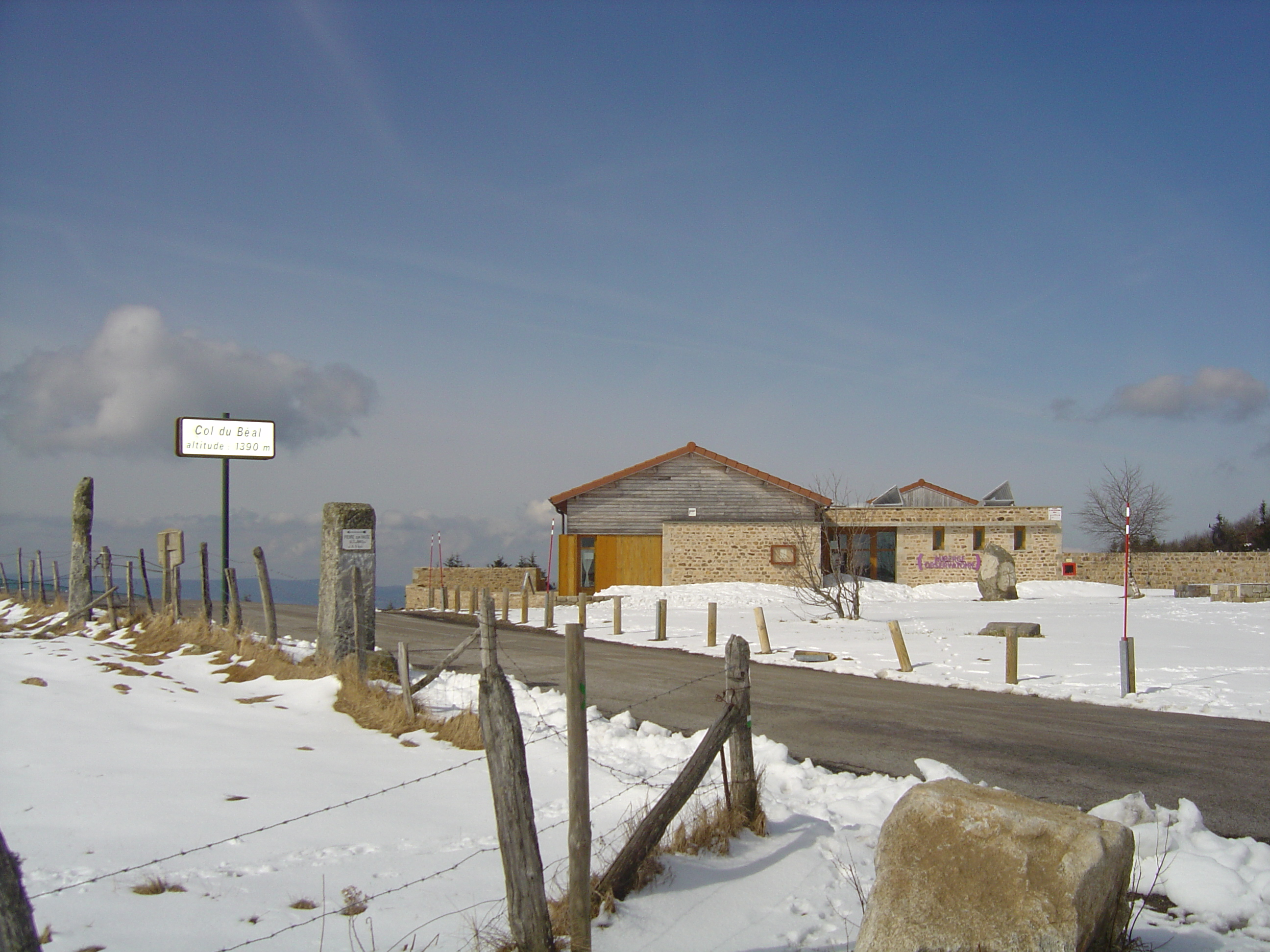
Col du Béal (1,390 metres), at the top of the Chalmazellois slope

The climb to Chalmazel from the Forez plain is a 21-kilometer route that features several downhill sections, including the Côte de Saint-Georges-sous-Couzan (2nd category, 7.5 km at 5.6%) and the ascent to Chalmazel itself (3rd category, 6.8 km at 3.7%). In 2016, this route was part of stage 2 of the Critérium du Dauphiné, with a finish at the foot of the slopes, won by Spaniard Jesús Herrada ahead of Frenchman Tony Gallopin.

From the resort of Chalmazel, cyclists climb the Col du Béal at 1,390 meters, via the D6 departmental road, which offers a steady gradient of around 5% over 10 kilometers. The ascent can also be made from the low point, at Leigneux, via a route offering 27 kilometers of ascent at 3.6% for 975 meters of vertical drop. It can be extended to the summit of Pierre-sur-Haute by taking the 4.5-kilometre military road, bringing the total ascent to 1,200 metres.

The ascent can also be made on the Auvergne side, in particular from Vertolaye, via Saint-Pierre-la-Bourlhonne, via a circuit classified as hors catégorie in 2014, with a vertical drop of 895 meters over 13 km, using the D268A, D268 and D40 departmental roads. The gradient here is around 7% on the whole climb.

The pass has also hosted significant cycling events, including the finish of the third stage of the 2010 Tour de l'Avenir, won by Belgian rider Yannick Eijssen, and the second stage of the 2014 Critérium du Dauphiné, won by Christopher Froome, just ahead of Alberto Contador.

=== Nearby ===
Climbing is practiced in Chalmazel, on the Rocher de l'Olme, on level 5 routes 35 to 40 meters high. The site offers unobstructed views over the resort and the Forez plain. Level 6 and 7 climbs can be found at Rory rock, in the neighboring commune of Saint-Georges-en-Couzan, with 25 climbing.

Summer tourism can also be extended with visits to nearby sites and monuments, in particular the Château de Chalmazel, whose construction began in 1231 at the instigation of the Marcilly family and was continued by the Talaru family from 1372. Part of the Forez domain, this feudal castle controlled the road to Auvergne via the Béal pass. With its medieval appearance, the château retains elements of a fortified house dating from 1231, along with various modifications and additions made by the Talaru family over the centuries, including loopholes, wall bases, a keep, and a machicolated parapet walk. It also features Renaissance elements, such as its facade, inner courtyard, galleries, and chapel.

== Tourism economy ==
=== Reception facilities ===
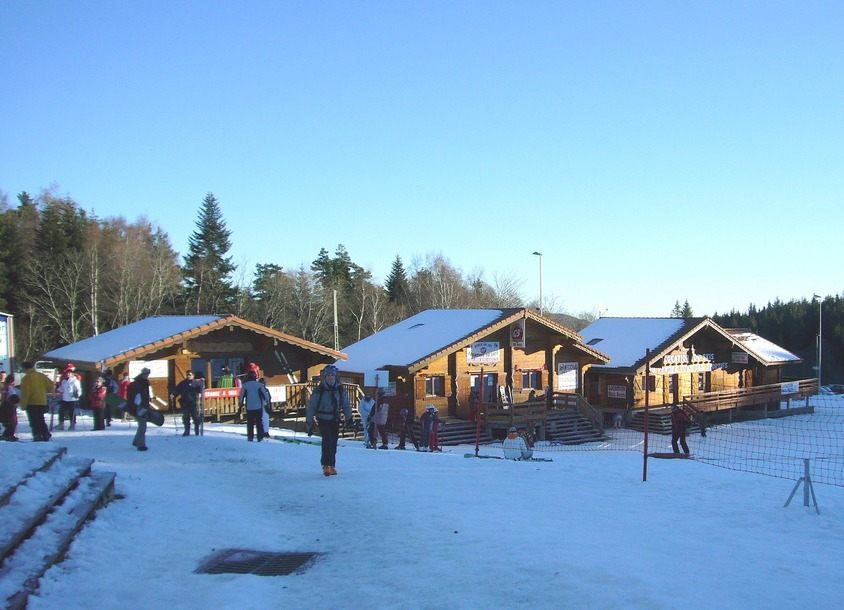
Sports equipment stores and ESF.

Chalmazel offers a variety of tourist facilities to enhance the visitor experience. At the foot of the slopes, the French Ski School, with eight instructors, provides ski lessons, alongside the International Ski School, established in 2012. Ski and hiking equipment can be found at three dedicated stores for renting or purchasing gear. During the winter season, the Conseil général de la Loire employs up to 36 people, including seasonal workers, to manage the resort's operations.

Dining options cater to diverse preferences, featuring regional cuisine at the Les Granges farmhouse inn, self-service meals at the Les Épilobes cafeteria, and takeaway options from two hot spots, one with a terrace overlooking the slopes. Additionally, a picnic room is available for those who prefer to bring their own food. Visitors can also explore nearby restaurants in the village, ensuring a variety of dining experiences.

Accommodation at the resort remains limited. The vacation village, built in the 1980s, suffers from being at a distance of almost 1 kilometer from the foot of the slopes and has been unused since 2005. At the resort itself, only four apartments, converted by the Conseil Général in 2009 and awarded the 3 Clévacances label, are available for rental (representing 23 tourist beds). There is also the Chalet des Roannais, offering group accommodation (45 tourist beds), and the Granges motorhome park. The hotel offer is based on a single establishment with 44 tourist beds, located between the resort and the village at Les Pinasses.

=== Visitor numbers ===
For the 2009–2010 winter season, Chalmazel recorded 80,694 skier days for sales of 884,070 euros. Total sales for all activities combined came to 921,236 euros.

Since the Conseil Général de la Loire took over direct management of the resort on 1 November 2003, average annual attendance for the following 8 winter seasons has been 72,086 skier days, for average annual sales of 884,070 euros, with a peak of 100,739 skier days for average annual sales of 1,144,086 euros in the 2008–2009 season. These financial revenues enable the resort to self-manage its operating expenses, but do not cover major investments, which remain the responsibility of the local authority.

Chalmazel experienced a significant decline in visitor numbers during the 2006–2007 season, with a total of 33,720 skier days, attributed to low snowfall throughout the winter. Since then, investments in additional snow guns and slope treatment, including grassing and snow barriers, have allowed the operator to reliably open a significant portion of the ski area for the Christmas vacation period. This period has accounted for just over 20% of sales since the 2002–2003 season and continued for the following eight winter seasons. Additionally, these improvements have enabled the area to remain open at least until the end of the winter holidays. The Christmas vacations represented nearly 50% of average annual sales between 2002 and 2010, making them a crucial source of revenue for Chalmazel.

In winter 2012, Chalmazel attracted 65,420 skier days, highlighting its popularity for winter sports. During the summer of 2011, the Jasseries chairlift and Les Écureuils acrobranche park contributed to the area's appeal, with 3,460 and 2,500 tickets sold, respectively. Overall, Chalmazel ranks as the second-largest paying tourist site in the region, following the Saint-Martin-la-Plaine Zoological Park and outpacing attractions like the Saint-Etienne museums and the Château de Bouthéon.

Chalmazel primarily attracts a local clientele, with 58% of skiers hailing from the Loire department and 26% from neighboring areas like Puy-de-Dôme and, to a lesser extent, Rhône. This local focus is partly due to the ski area's size, featuring just 12 kilometers of runs and limited on-site accommodation. However, Chalmazel benefits from its beautiful natural setting in the Forez mountains, modern lift facilities, and its distinction as the only downhill ski resort in the Loire department. This makes it an appealing option for day visitors from the Forez plain and the Roanne and Saint-Etienne conurbations.

== See also ==
- Pierre-sur-Haute
- Chalmazel
