= Chalmazel =

Former commune in Loire, France

- Part of Chalmazel-Jeansagnière
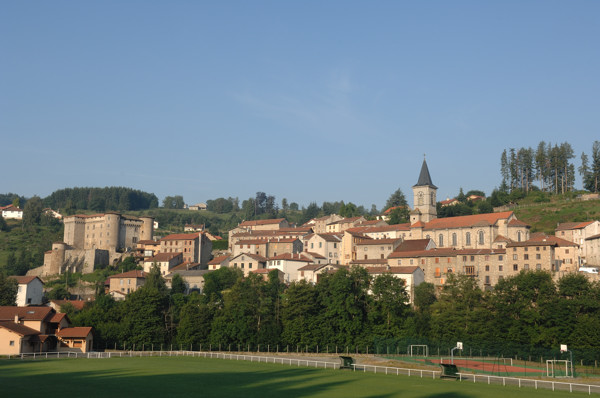

- Coat of arms
- Location of Chalmazel
- Location within France Location within Auvergne-Rhône-Alpes
- Coordinates: 45°42′19″N 3°51′05″E
- Country: France
- Region: Auvergne-Rhône-Alpes
- Department: Loire
- Arrondissement: Montbrison
- Canton: Boën-sur-Lignon
- Commune: Chalmazel-Jeansagnière
- Area^{1}: 39.38 km^{2} (15.20 sq mi)
- Highest elevation: 1,640 m (5,380 ft)
- Lowest elevation: 740 m (2,430 ft)
- Population (2023): 370
  - Density: 9.4/km^{2} (24/sq mi)
- Time zone: UTC+01:00 (CET)
  - Summer (DST): UTC+02:00 (CEST)
- Postal code: 42920
- ^{1} French Land Register data, which excludes lakes, ponds, glaciers > 1 km^{2} (0.386 sq mi or 247 acres) and river estuaries.

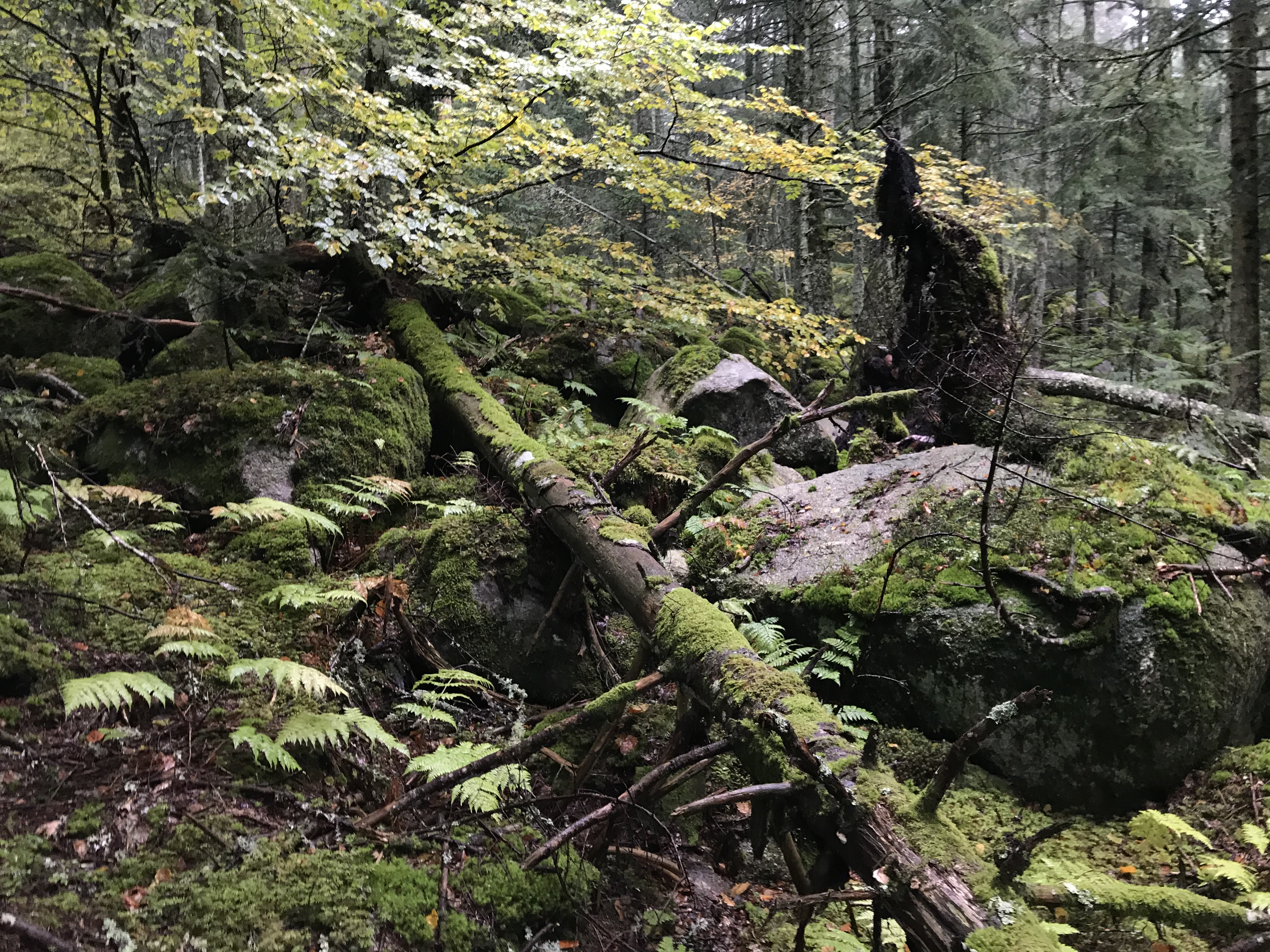
Forest in the commune of Chalmazel-Jeansagnière

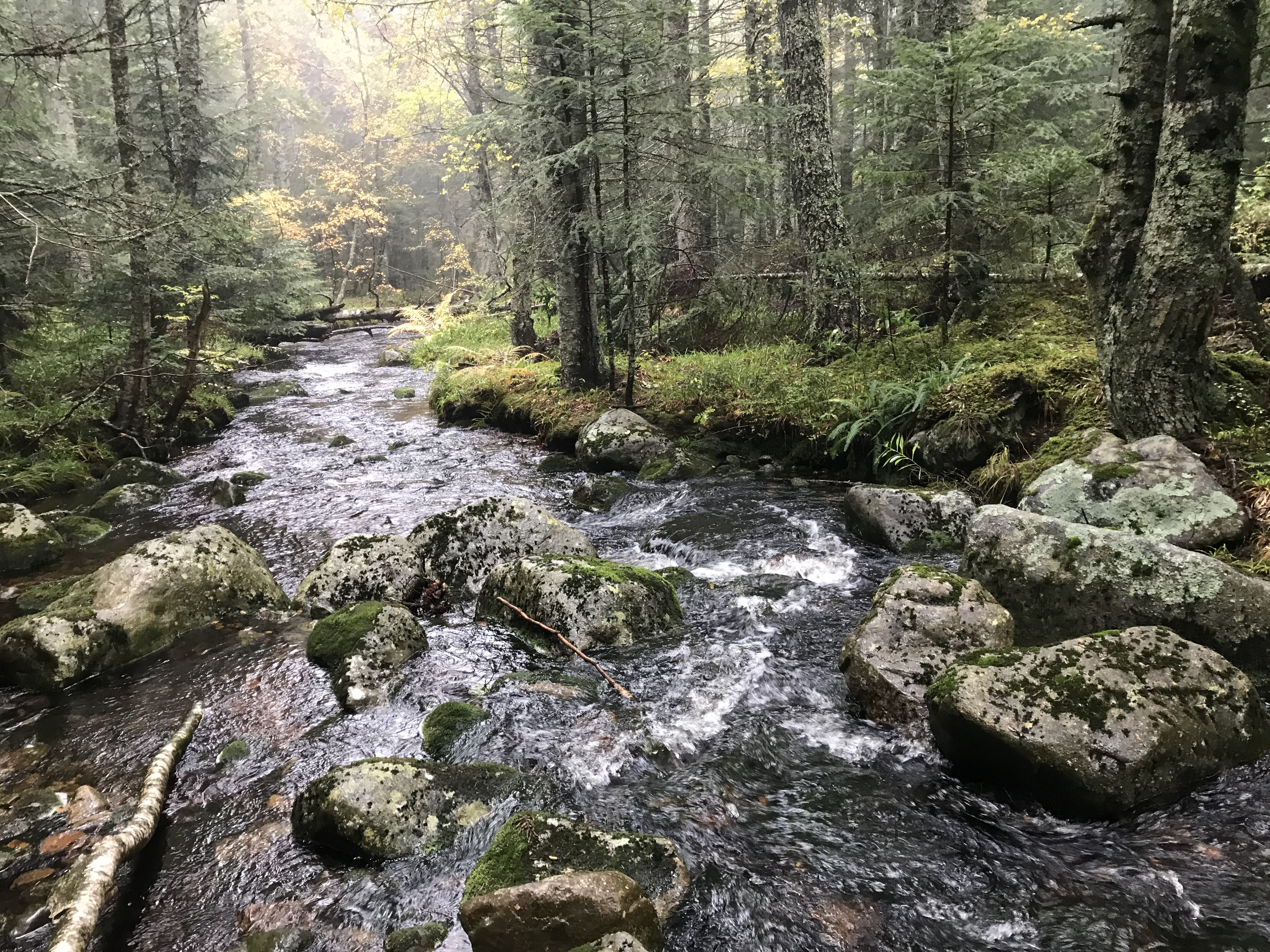
Ruisseau de la Morte in Chalmazel.

Chalmazel, in Forézian Arpitan Vers-Charmasél (pronounced [ve.ʃam.ˈze]), is a former French commune in the Loire department of the Rhône-Alpes region, known for its winter sports resort and château.

By decree of October 22, 2015, effective January 1, 2016, Chalmazel merged with Jeansagnière to create the first new commune in the Loire: Chalmazel-Jeansagnière.

== Geography ==
The commune of Chalmazel lies at the heart of the Forez mountains, a mountain range in the Massif Central separating the Dore valley from the Forez plain. The village lies at an altitude of 800 metres on the side of a valley bordered by the Lignon, a tributary of the Loire. The boundary of the commune is marked to the east by the Col de la Croix de Ladret (1,046 metres) and the Pic de Morière (1,137 metres), and to the west by the Col du Béal (1,390 metres) and the massif's highest point, Pierre-sur-Haute (1,631 metres). However, the latter is located on the commune of Sauvain for some 250 meters, unlike the winter sports resort on its flank, which remains on Chalmazel. The ridge running through the Col du Béal and Pierre-sur-Haute also marks the separation between the departments of Loire (Rhône-Alpes region) and Puy-de-Dôme (Auvergne region). It is home to vast, undulating plateaux of moorland dotted with peat bogs, known as the hautes Chaumes, classified Natura 2000 for their floristic interest.

== Origin of the commune's name ==
The name Chalmazel has been around since ancient times. According to Albert Dauzat, the origin of the toponym could come from *calmis: high bare plateau, a Prelatin word; and mazel: mazet, mas, manse, house, from the Latin man(s)um, substantive past participle of the verb manere: to dwell.

Various spellings are attested over the centuries: Chalmazel in 1214, Chalmasel in 1225, Charmazel in 1313, Chalmazel in the 18th century (Cassini map).

After the Revolution, the parish became a commune: An II (1793): Chalmazelles. Bulletin des lois of 1801: Chalmazelle. And finally in 1939: Chalmazel, the definitive official spelling.

== History ==
In 1231, Guy IV, Count of Forez, allowed his loyal vassal Arnaud de Marcilly to build a fortified house at Chalmazelles. The objectives were clear: on the one hand, to control the upper Lignon valley, a modest passageway between the provinces of Forez and Auvergne via the present-day Béal pass, and on the other, to guard the seigneury of Couzan, owned by the Damas family with links to the German Emperor (Renaud de Damas was not a secure vassal for the Count of Forez).

By 1250, Chalmazelle had become, along with Couzan, Rochefort and Urfé (aux d'Urfé), one of the four great keep seigneuries of the “evening mountains” (Monts du Forez).

The Talaru family succeeded the Marcilly family in the seigneury of Chalmazel: Béatrix de Marcilly, who had married Mathieu de Talaru, became heiress to Antoine de Marcilly, her brother, in 1388; the land of Chalmazel thus remained with the Talaru family (ancient nobility of Forez).

The church of Chalmazel seems to have been founded around 1270 under Jean de Marcilly, second lord of Chalmazel, and dedicated to Saint Jean-Baptiste, the patron saint of its founder.

The parish of Chalmazel was at that time an annex of Saint-Just-en-Bas; the oldest known parish priest of Chalmazel is Giraud de Boissel, originally from Saint-Just-en-Bas, who lived in 1370.

According to the Cahier des Visites (the bishop's inspection tour) of 1614, the parish was named Saint-Jehan-des-Neiges; then, in 1662, Exaltation of the Holy Cross, and finally Saint-Jean-Baptiste.

The ancient church of Saint-Jehan-des-Neiges was demolished in 1881 and replaced by the present-day church, best known for its famous stained-glass windows by Théodore Hanssen (1885-1957), an internationally renowned master glass artist.

On the death of the last Marquis, Louis-Justin de Talaru, in 1850, the château was bequeathed to the Congregation of the Sisters of St. Joseph, who used it as a hospice and dispensary until 1972.

== Politics and administration ==
List of successive mayors
Period		Identity	Label	Quality
Missing data must be completed.
June 1800	January 1808	Jean Fenon		
January 1808	May 1815	Barthélemy Jacquet		
May 1815	June 1821	Théodore Jean-Pierre Marie Recorbet		
June 1821	September 1848	Barthélemy Jacquet fils		
September 1848	September 1870	Jean Viot		
September 1870	October 1876	Jean-Marie Fayard		
October 1876	May 1888	Jean-Antoine Jacquet		
May 1888	May 1892	Jean-Baptiste Chazelle		
May 1892	1908	Jean-Joseph Murat		
1908	1922	Antoine Valezy		
1922	1962	Joseph Valezy		
1962	1971	René Roche		
1971	1977	Jean Gouttefarde		
1977	1983	Michel Pizzo		
1983	1995	Louis Brandon		
1995	2002	Pierre Chazal		
2002	2008	Michel Parois		
2008	2014	André Gallo	DVG	
2014	2015	Valéry Gouttefarde	DVD	

It was part of the Loire Forez urban community.

== Demographics ==
Historical population

Year	Pop.	±% p.a.
1793	1,097	—
1821	907	−0.68%
1846	1,772	+2.72%
1872	1,238	−1.37%
1901	1,297	+0.16%
1926	1,109	−0.62%
1946	981	−0.61%
1962	859	−0.83%

Year	Pop.	±% p.a.
1968	813	−0.91%
1975	743	−1.28%
1982	670	−1.47%
1990	597	−1.43%
1999	485	−2.28%
2007	453	−0.85%
2012	395	−2.70%
2023	370	−0.59%

Source: EHESS and INSEE (2007-2019)

== Local culture and heritage ==
=== Places and monuments ===
- Saint-Jean-Baptiste church in Chalmazel. The building was listed as a historic monument in 2021.

==== The castle ====
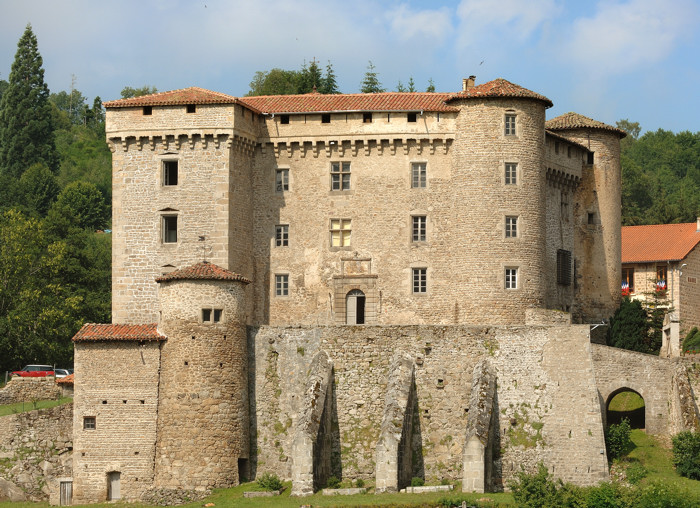
Château de Chalmazel.

Château de Chalmazel stands in the middle of the village. Construction began in 1231 under the Marcilly family and was continued by the Talaru family from 1372. Part of the Forez domain, this feudal castle was used to control the road to Auvergne via the Béal pass. Medieval in appearance, it retains elements of the fortified house dating from 1231, but with all the successive modifications and additions made by the Talaru family over the centuries: loopholes, base of the walls, keep, machicolated parapet walk. It also features Renaissance elements: facade, inner courtyard, galleries and chapel. Now restored, it is open to visitors and has guest rooms and function rooms.

==== The ski resort ====
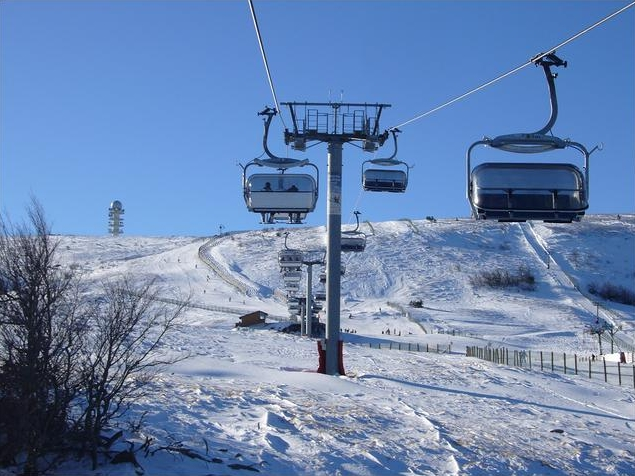
Chairlift

The ski resort is located at an altitude of 1,109 meters, in a place called Les Bois, 4 kilometers as the crow flies from the village 250 meters below. The resort is linked to the village by the 6-kilometer route départementale no. 63, and is served by route 112 of the Transports Interurbains de la Loire (TIL).

The first Chalmazel ski lift was built in 1953, and from the 1960s onwards, the resort expanded under the impetus of Éloi Marcoux, president of the local Ski-club, and Henri Essertel, general secretary of the commune of Montbrison and the Régie de Chalmazel. Support from the Conseil Général and its president, Antoine Pinay, enabled the gondola to be built in 1967.

The ski area extends from 1,109 to 1,600 meters, directly on the slopes of Pierre-sur-Haute (1,634 meters), the highest point of the Monts du Forez. It alternates between forests and wild highland moors (les hautes Chaumes) and boasts 12 kilometers of downhill ski runs, served by 1 detachable bubble chairlift and 7 drag lifts, and equipped with 90 snow guns. Conditions permitting, the resort also boasts a small snowpark, and the surrounding area is ideal for cross-country skiing (Haut Forez Nordic area at Col de la Loge) and snowkiting (Col du Béal). The resort also offers summer activities (accrobranche park, mountain biking, hiking via chairlift).

Chalmazel mainly attracts daily visitors from the Forez plain and the Roanne and St. Etienne conurbations, less than 80 kilometers away, but also, to a lesser extent, from Clermont-Ferrand and Lyon.

=== Heraldry ===
Coat of arms	Cartel: 1st and 4th per pale Or and Azure, a bend Gules, 2nd and 3rd Sable semé d'étoiles Or, a lion Or.
Details	The official status of the coat of arms has yet to be determined.

== See also ==
- Communes of the Loire department
