= Burle =

Winter wind in France

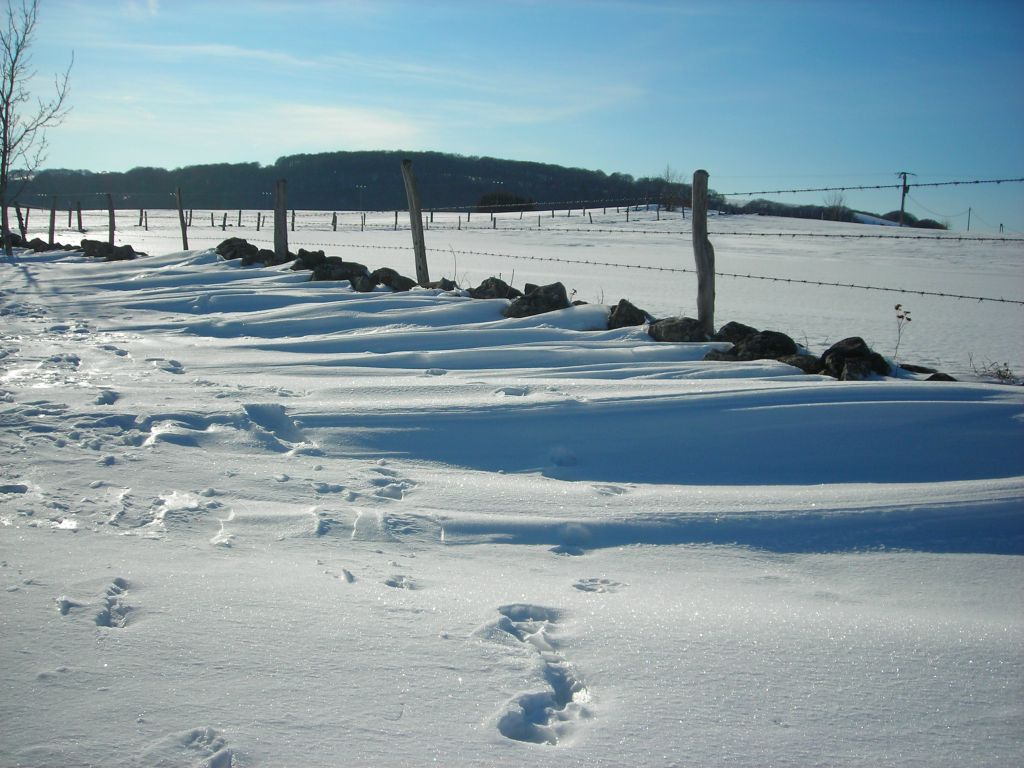
Small snowdrifts formed by the burle on the Aubrac plateau.

The burle is the name given to the north wind that blows in the winter in the south-central part of France, east of the Massif Central, on the bare plateaus of Velay, Ardèche, or the Forez mountains.

The burle is a winter wind that usually blows in already cold regions. The resulting perceived temperature is often particularly low, creating a chilling atmosphere. When the region is snowy, the burle can be responsible for the formation of snowdrifts.

The "Triangle de la Burle" is an expression popularized by the journalist Jean Peyrard in the 1980s to describe an area between the Pilat Massif near Saint-Étienne, Puy-en-Velay, and Mont Mézenc where many air disasters are said to have occurred over the past century.

== See also ==
- List of local winds
