= French Wikipedia =

French-language edition of Wikipedia

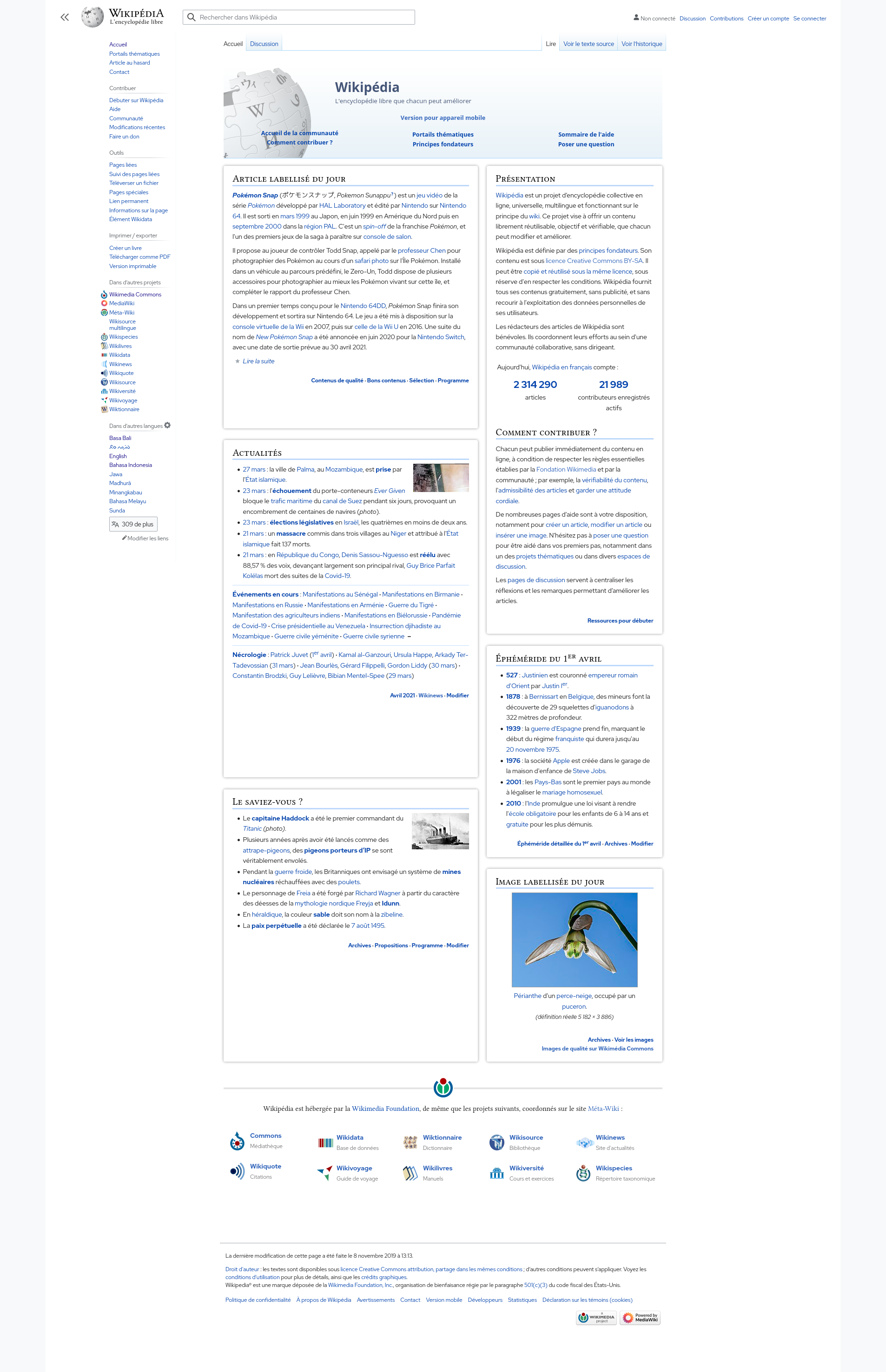
- Screenshot Main Page of the French Wikipedia in March 2021
- Website type: Online encyclopedia
- Available in: French
- Owner: Wikimedia Foundation
- Website: fr.wikipedia.org
- Commercial: No
- Registration: Optional
- Users: 6.18 million (as of 21 November 2026)
- Launched: 23 March 2001; 25 years ago
- Content license: Creative Commons Attribution/ Share-Alike 4.0 (most text also dual-licensed under GFDL); Media licensing varies

The French Wikipedia (French: Wikipédia en français) is the French-language edition of Wikipedia, the free online encyclopedia. This edition was started on 23 March 2001, two months after the official creation of Wikipedia. It has 2,790,639 articles as of 21 November 2026, making it the fourth-largest Wikipedia language version, after the English-, Cebuano-, and German-language editions, and the largest Wikipedia edition in a Romance language. It has the third-most edits, and ranks 5th in terms of depth among Wikipedia editions, in addition to being the third-largest Wikipedia edition by number of active users as of January 2025. It was the third edition, after the English Wikipedia and German Wikipedia, to exceed 1 million articles: this occurred on 23 September 2010. In April 2016, the project had 4,657 active editors who made at least five edits in that month.

In 2008, the French encyclopaedia Quid cancelled its 2008 edition, citing falling sales on competition from the French edition of Wikipedia.

As of November 2026, there are 6,183,000 users, 141 admins and 79,324 files on the French Wikipedia.

On 2 December 2014, the French-language Wikipedia became the third-largest language edition by number of registered users, overtaking for the first time the German edition, with 2,022,504 registered users, behind the English (23,300,456) and Spanish (3,401,493) language editions.

== Statistics ==
The countries in which the French Wikipedia is the most popular language version of Wikipedia are shown in dark blue.

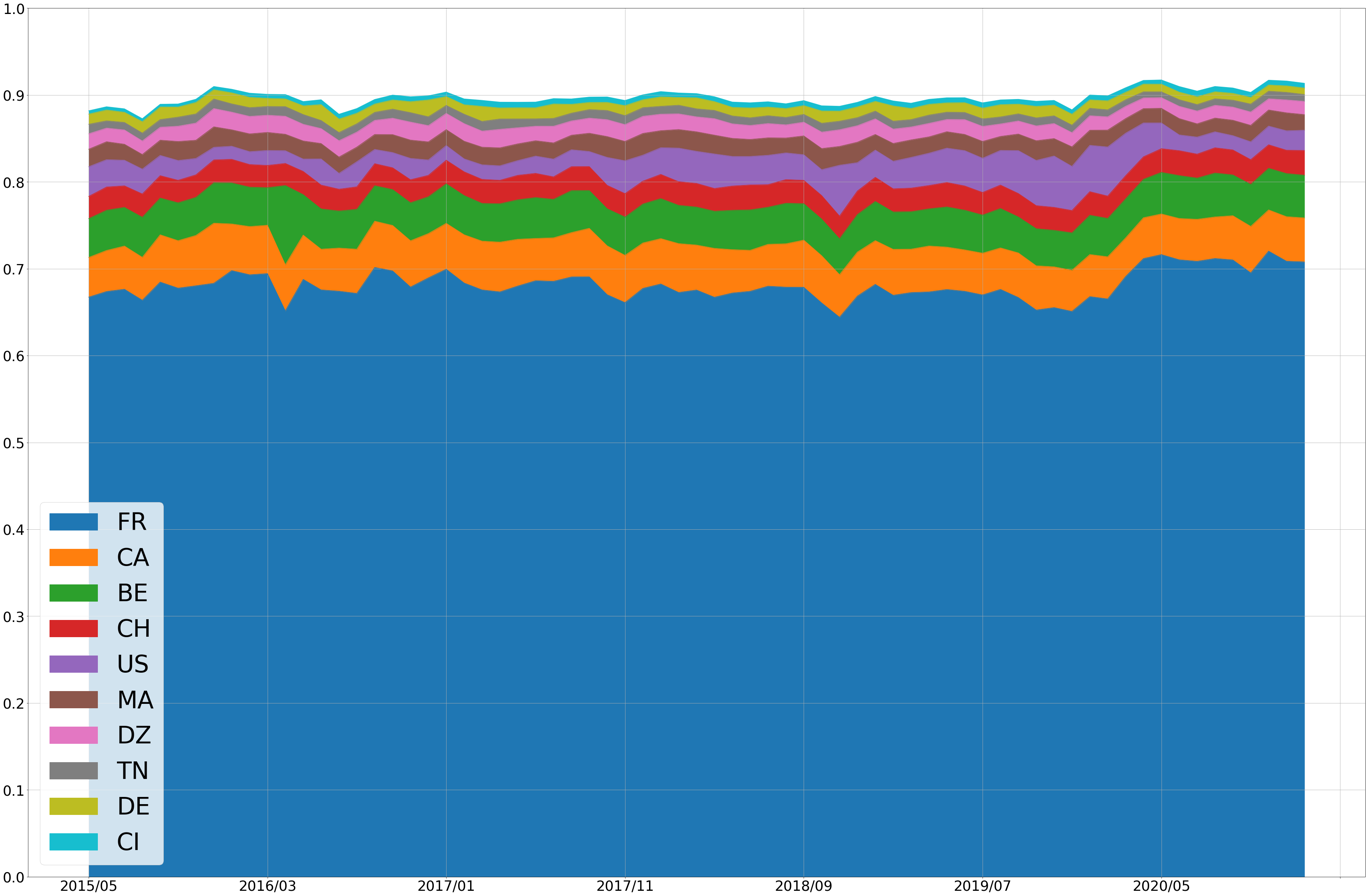
Page views by country over time on the French Wikipedia

The audience measurement company Médiamétrie questioned a sample of 8,500 users residing in France with access to Internet at home or at their place of work. Médiamétrie found that in June 2007, French Wikipedia had: 7,910,000 unique visitors that visited the site at least once during the month of June 2007 (compared to 4,355,000 unique visitors in June 2006); 2.7 visits per visitor during the period (2.0 visits in June 2006); had held the 12th position (21st in 2006) in "the Top 30 most visited sites in France, excluding Internet applications", according to the criterion of the number of unique visitors and 12th position in "the Top 30 most visited sites in France, including Internet applications", like eMule or Real Networks (22nd position in June 2006).

By August 2011, French Wikipedia was the 7th most visited site in France, with nearly 16 million unique visitors a month (according to Médiamétrie). In April 2012, it had 20 million unique visitors per month, or 2.4 million per day with over 700 million page views.

== Study ==
According to a 2013 study by Taha Yasseri et al., from Oxford Internet Institute, Ségolène Royal (FR) and unidentified flying object (objet volant non identifié) were the most controversial articles on the French Wikipedia.

Based on an analysis of discussions on the French Wikipedia, Sahut (2016) concludes that internal disputes over sourcing and admissibility can be understood as a tension between two ideal-typical “knowledge regimes”: a wiki regime, which prioritizes open participation and quantitative growth, and an encyclopedic regime, which emphasizes reliability and verifiable sources. On the French Wikipedia, this has resulted in a hybrid compromise in which strict referencing rules coexist with egalitarian wiki norms such as “N’hésitez pas” and “Supposer la bonne foi.” Sahut finds that the French Wikipedia community applies its sourcing policies in a relatively lenient manner. Although editors frequently discuss the large number of articles that lack references, unsourced material is generally not removed in a systematic way. Rather than enforcing the rules strictly, the community often relies on templates and tags to signal sourcing issues.

The study "Cultural Differences in Collaborative Authoring of Wikipedia" (2006) shows a strong negative correlation between a country’s Power distance Index (as defined in Hofstede's cultural dimensions theory) and the frequency of deletion edits in its corresponding Wikipedia language edition. In high-PDI cultures such as France, people are more accustomed to having important decisions made by superiors and therefore tend to avoid actions that invalidate someone else’s work. As a result, contributors on the French Wikipedia are likely to feel uncomfortable about deleting others’ work and are less likely to delete information or links.

The French-language Wikipedia tends to be more formal than the English or German editions, with contributors often addressing each other using formal pronouns, following the conventions described by the T–V distinction.

== Differences from other Wikipedias ==
An important difference with the English Wikipedia is that like the Spanish Wikipedia, or the Portuguese Wikipedia in the past, following a community vote in 2006 the French Wikipedia does not accept any images posted under fair use, with the only exception being logos. As of 2025, this exact ban is still in effect.

Another important difference is that while Wikipedia administrators are elected for an indefinite period, anybody can start a formal "motion of no confidence" contesting their status, with the community thereby invited to vote for or against removing their privileges. This also exists on the Spanish and Portuguese Wikipedia.

== See also ==
- Pierre-sur-Haute military radio station § Censorship on Wikipedia and unwanted attention
