= Pierre-sur-Haute =

Mountain in central France

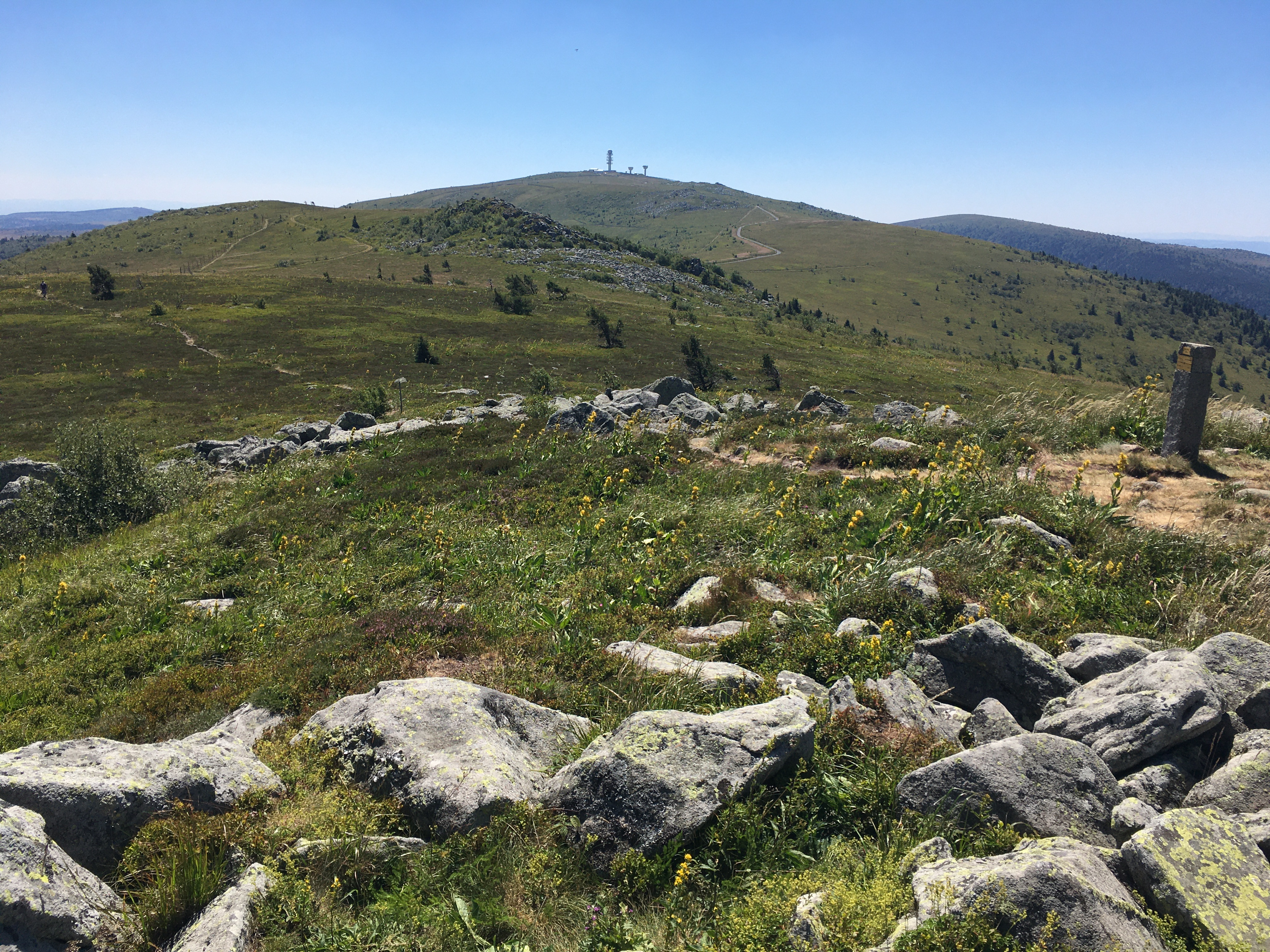
- Pierre-sur-Haute from Peyre-Mayou.

Highest point
- Elevation: 1,631 m (5,351 ft)
- Coordinates: 45°39′11″N 3°48′33″E

Geography
- Location within France
- Location: Loire, Puy-de-Dôme departements, France
- Parent range: Forez mountains (Massif Central)

Pierre-sur-Haute (French pronunciation: [pjɛʁ syʁ ot]; Occitan: Pèira sèrra auta) is the highest point of the Forez mountains (1,631 m) in the Massif Central, at the boundary of the Loire (Sauvain) and Puy-de-Dôme (Job) departments. It is also the highest point in the Loire department.

== Geology ==
Pierre-sur-Haute is a mountain composed of gneiss and granite, rocks that are remnants of an ancient mountain range that appeared in the Paleozoic era, 300 million years ago. This ancient Hercynian relief was subsequently leveled during the Mesozoic era due to erosion, resulting in a tabular relief. Following the Alpine orogeny, the Forez mountains were rejuvenated, faults appeared, and this granite block was uplifted (horst). Pierre-sur-Haute is the highest point of this uplifted block.

== See also ==
- Chalmazel Ski Resort
- Livradois-Forez Regional Natural Park
- Pierre-sur-Haute military radio station
