= Joint Directorate of Infrastructure Networks and Information Systems =

Organisation of the French Armed Forces

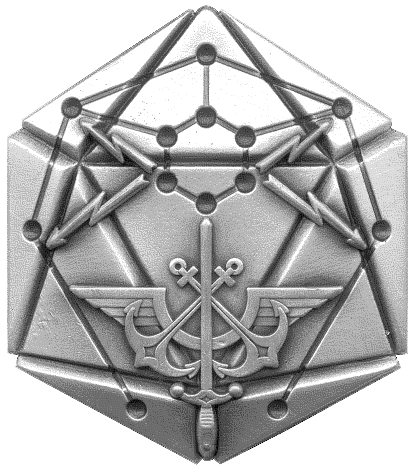
The unit's insignia.

The Joint Directorate of Infrastructure Networks and Information Systems (Direction Interarmées des Réseaux d'Infrastructure et des Systèmes d'Information, or DIRISI) is a Communications and information systems organisation of the French Armed Forces. The DIRISI was created on 1 January 2004 by decree of 31 December 2003. The staff of the DIRISI is located at Fort de Bicetre in the town of Kremlin-Bicêtre (Val de Marne).

Among its installations is the Pierre-sur-Haute military radio station.
