= Château de Chalmazel =

Castle in Auvergne-Rhône-Alpes, France

Coordinates: 45°42′9″N 3°51′4″E

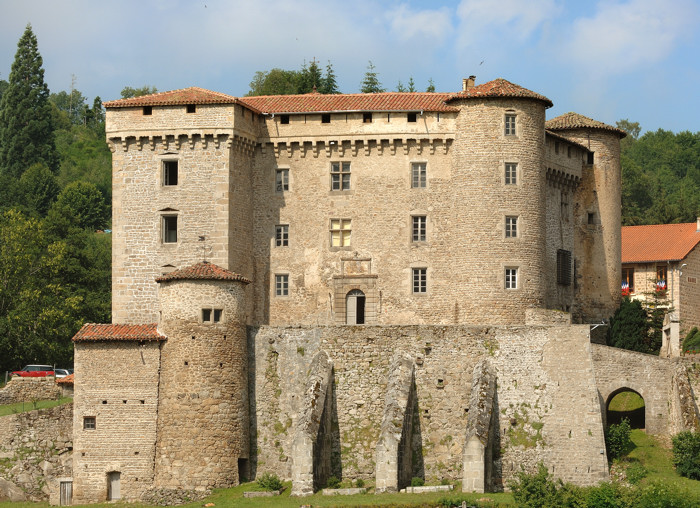
East front of the château

The Château de Chalmazel, or Château des Talaru is a castle situated in the commune of Chalmazel, in the Loire département of France. It is located in the Haut-Forez, between the towns of Saint-Étienne and Thiers. Its name in medieval times was Saint-Jehan-des-Neiges. The castle dominates the valley of the Lignon and it was built to be an impregnable fortress on the instructions of the Count of Forez.

== History ==
Construction of the fortress began in 1231. The work was carried out by seigneur (Lord) Arnaud de Marcilly to the order of Guy IV du Forez who financed it. The site was covered by forest and almost inaccessible. Initially, it functioned rather as a fortified house, but it was transformed into a genuine medieval fortress, intended to counteract the ambitions of the powerful neighbours of the seigneurie of Couzan, then in the hands of the Damas family, linked to the Germanic emperor.

The castle appeared gloomy and severe, with four round towers dominated by a square keep, with no openings on the sides.

When Antoine de Marcilly died aged 25 with no direct heirs in 1371, the castle passed to his sister Béatrix, last of the Marcilly line. She had married Mathieu de Talaru in 1364; thus the seigneurie of Chalmazel passed to the Talarus, an old noble family from the Lyonnais.

Following the destruction of the Château de Marcilly, the Talarus withdrew to the castle at Chamazel and, in 1400, they built the ramparts, in the form of a pentagonal enceinte and added machicolations to the keep. After the incorporation of Forez into the Kingdom of France, the Talarus served the king in his armies.

During the Renaissance, the Marquis de Talaru, returning from the Italian Wars, added Renaissance style embellishments: openwork facade, galleries to the inner court, painting in the chapel, sculptures.

But the winters were harsh, and from 1533, the Talarus preferred to live in their Château d'Écotay or in Saint-Marcel-de-Félines, acquired by marriage in 1559. Chalmazel was transformed into a summer residence and began to be neglected.

In the 18th century, the Talarus inherited by marriage the Château de Chamarande, near Arpajon, to the south of Paris, and they moved there to be closer to Versailles where Louis de Talaru held important posts in the royal court and the army. They abandoned the castle in 1650, carrying out only the most urgent work. The castle began a slow but sure deterioration.

In 1850, Louis-Justin, last Marquis of Talaru, 25th lord of Chalmazel, peer of France and ambassador, with no heirs, left the castle and the forest to the nuns of the Sœurs de Saint-Joseph, in order to establish a hospital for the canton for the care of the sick.

The nuns carried out some repair work (roof, round walk, rebuilding a tower) and decoration. Later, they transformed it into a boarding school for children from the school at Chamazel.

The nuns finally left the castle in 1972 and rented it to the commune, on the condition that it was maintained and opened to the public during the summer months.

The castle is now owned by new proprietors who intend to open it to visitors and to create chambres d'hôtes (bed and breakfast accommodation).

== Tourism ==
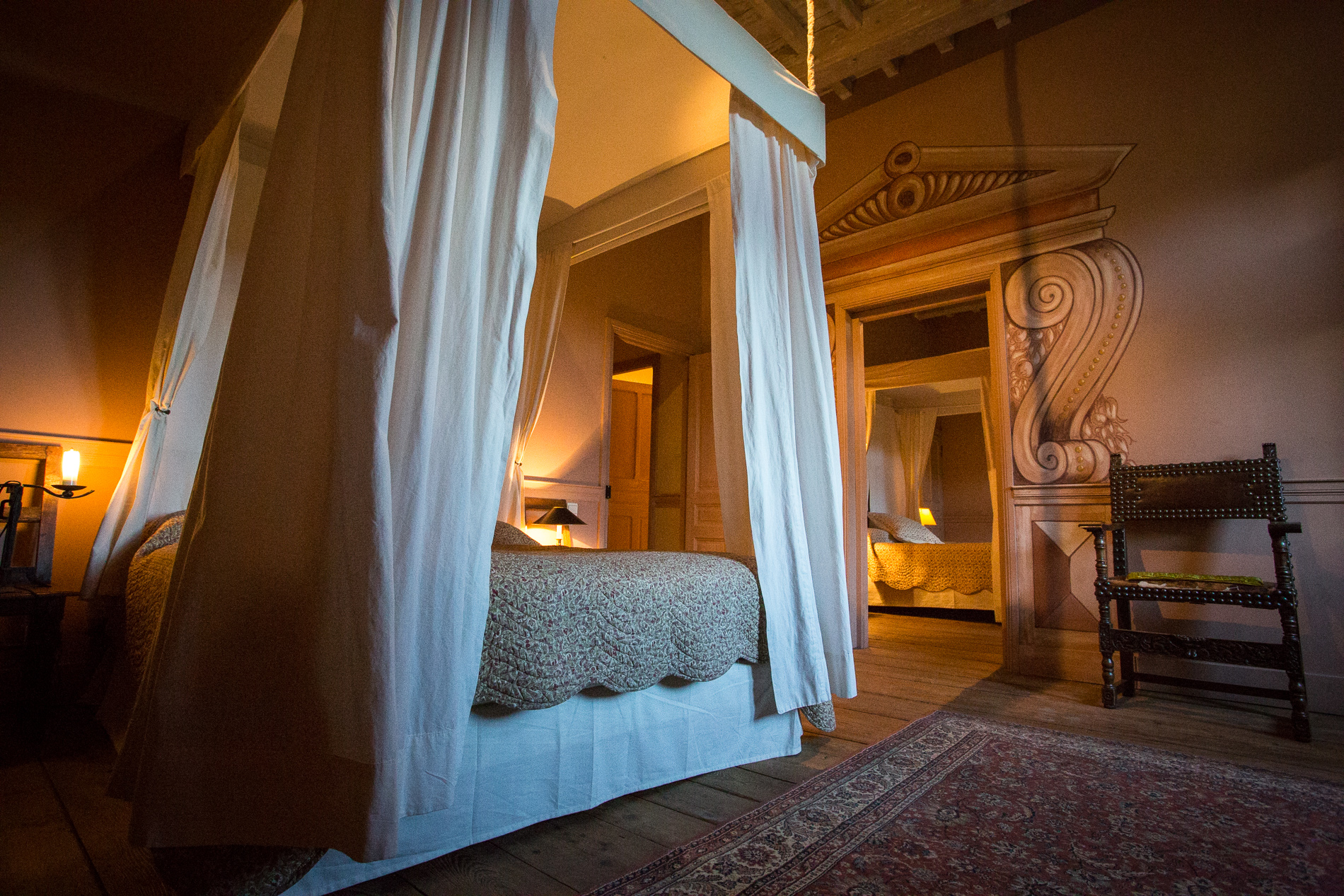
Guest suite with two adjoining bedrooms, shared modern bath and toilet.

The castle, with its medieval aspect, has kept the elements of a fortified house from the year 1231, but with all of the later modifications and additions by the Talarus over the centuries: murder-holes, walls, keep, round walk with machicolations - but it also has Renaissance elements: the facade, the inner courtyard, galleries and chapel.

The castle is open to visitors from June to September. It is possible to rent rooms and a suite.

The Château de Chalmazel is listed as a monument historique by the French Ministry of Culture.

== See also ==
- List of castles in France
