= Chalmazel-Jeansagnière =

Chalmazel-Jeansagnière Vers-Charmasél-Genceniéres
- Commune
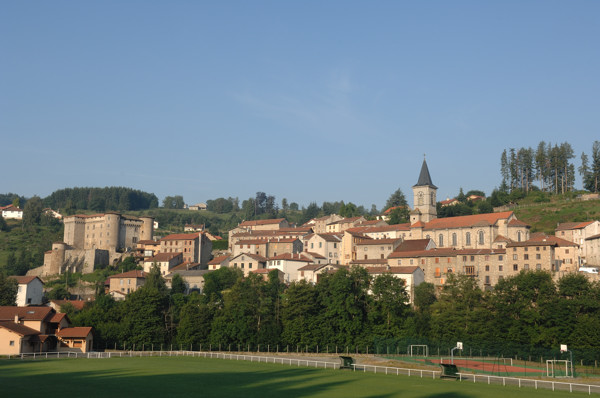
- Location of Chalmazel-Jeansagnière
- Location within France Location within Auvergne-Rhône-Alpes
- Coordinates: 45°42′14″N 3°51′04″E
- Country: France
- Region: Auvergne-Rhône-Alpes
- Department: Loire
- Arrondissement: Montbrison
- Canton: Boën-sur-Lignon
- Intercommunality: CA Loire Forez

Government
  - Mayor (2020–2026): Valéry Gouttefarde
- Area^{1}: 53.39 km^{2} (20.61 sq mi)
- Highest elevation: 1,600 m (5,200 ft)
- Lowest elevation: 740 m (2,430 ft)
- Population (2023): 457
  - Density: 8.56/km^{2} (22.2/sq mi)
- Time zone: UTC+01:00 (CET)
  - Summer (DST): UTC+02:00 (CEST)
- INSEE/Postal code: 42039 /42920
- ^{1} French Land Register data, which excludes lakes, ponds, glaciers > 1 km^{2} (0.386 sq mi or 247 acres) and river estuaries.

Chalmazel-Jeansagnière (French pronunciation: [ʃalmazɛl ʒɑ̃saɲɛʁ]) (Note: also known as Vers-Charmasél-Genceniéres (Franco-Provençal pronunciation: [ve.ʃam.ˈze.ʒɑ̃sa.ˈneʁ]) in Arpitan.) is a commune in the Loire department of central France. The municipality was established on 1 January 2016 and consists of the former communes of Chalmazel and Jeansagnière.

== See also ==
- Communes of the Loire department
