= Pierre-sur-Haute military radio station =

French military communications site

- Station hertzienne militaire de Pierre-sur-Haute (French)
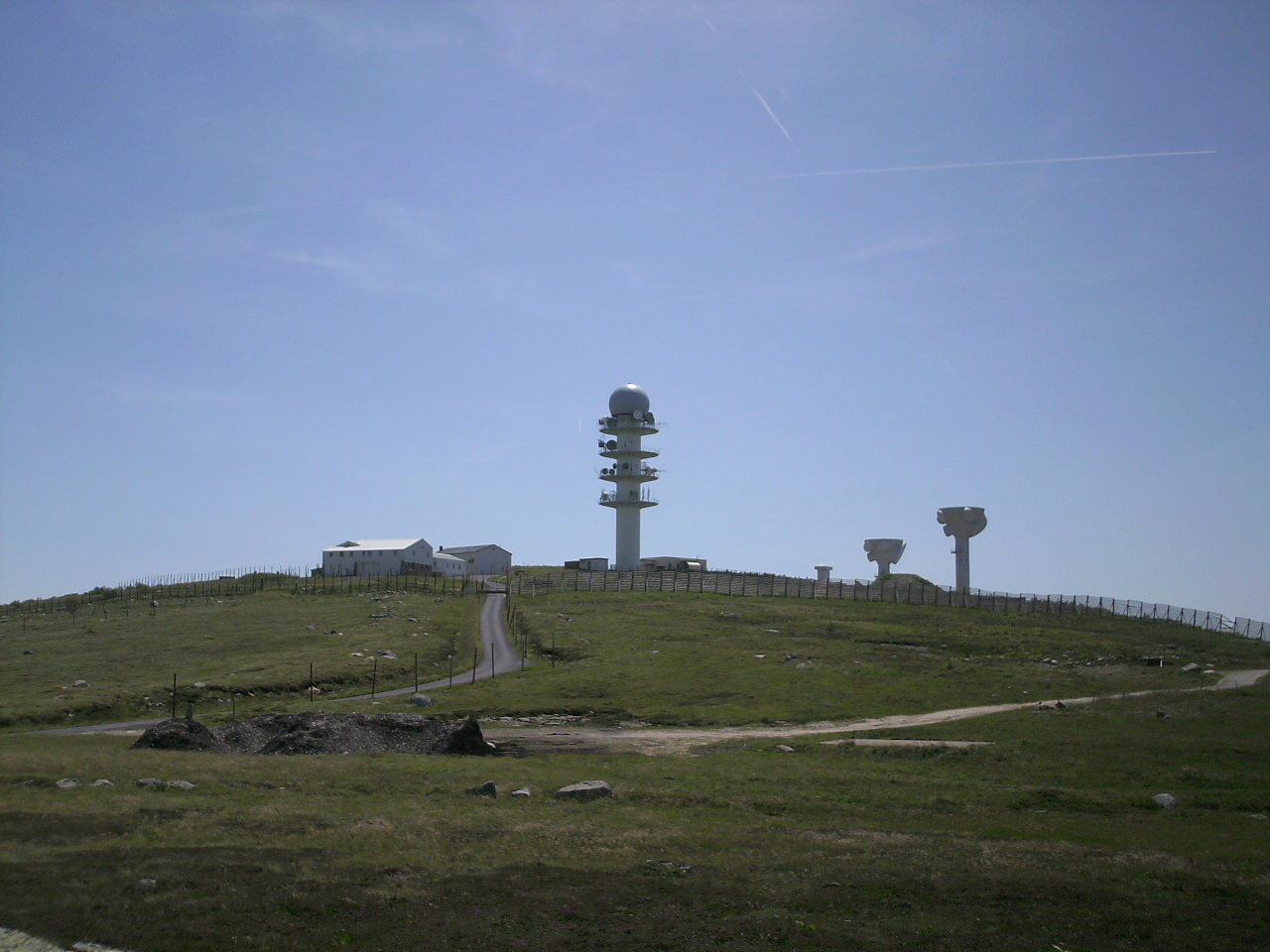
- The military radio station of Pierre-sur-Haute. Two military towers are pictured: the Télédiffusion de France relay tower is in the centre, with the living quarters, and a helipad.

Site information
- Type: Radio tower complex
- Controlled by: France

Location
- Location within France
- Coordinates: 45.6531°N 3.8084°E

Site history
- Built: 1961
- Materials: Concrete, steel

The Pierre-sur-Haute military radio station is a French military communications site that has been in use since 1913. The 30-hectare (74-acre) station is located on a hilltop in the Sauvain and Job communes 45.6531°N 3.8084°E. The site contains three towers, the tallest of which is a 55-metre-high civilian telecommunication tower owned by Télédiffusion de France.

In April 2013, the French interior intelligence agency DCRI pressured the president of Wikimedia France, Rémi Mathis, into deleting the French-language Wikipedia article about the station. It was then promptly restored by another Wikipedia contributor living in Switzerland. As a result of the controversy, the article temporarily became the most read page on the French Wikipedia, a notable example of the Streisand effect.

== History ==
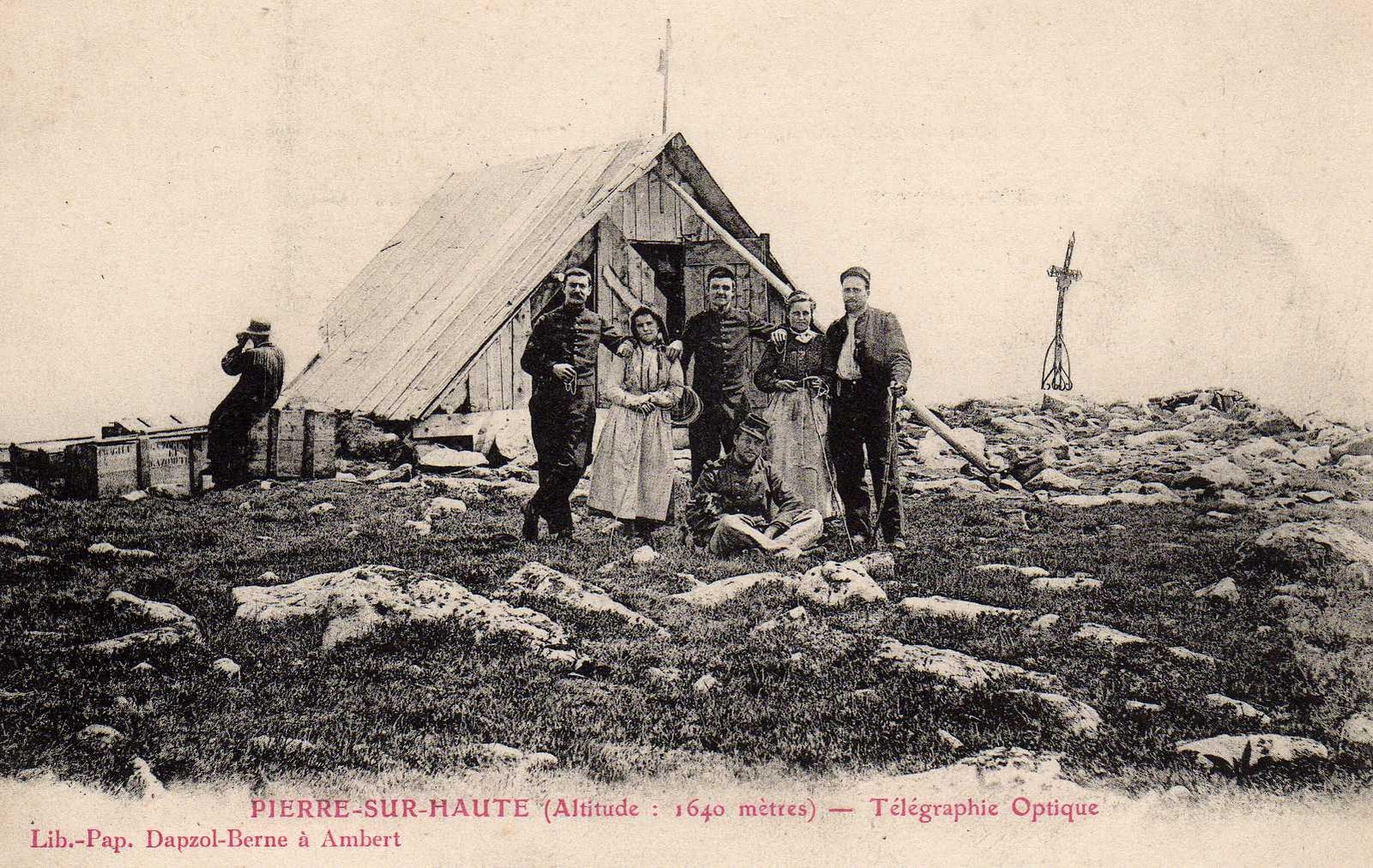
The visual-telegraph station in the 1910s

In 1913, a semaphore telegraph station (French: télégraphe Chappe) was built where the military radio station is now. At the time, it was a small stone building, with a semaphore on top.

In 1961, during the Cold War, NATO asked the French Army to build the station as part of the 82-node transmission network in Europe known as the ACE High system. In this network, the Pierre-sur-Haute station, or FLYZ, was a relay between the Lachens (FNIZ) station to the south and the Mont-Août (FADZ) station to the north. The NATO radio station was using American-made tropospheric scatter equipment to relay voice and telegraph signals on a network stretching from Turkey to the Arctic Polar Circle in Norway. The French Air Force took control of the station in 1974. In the late 1980s, the system was gradually replaced by a combination of national defense systems and some NATO-owned subsystems. The large parabolic antennas, known locally as Mickey's ears, were replaced with the current two-antenna setup in 1991.

== Role ==
The Pierre-sur-Haute station is controlled by the French Air Force and is a subsidiary of the Lyon – Mont Verdun Air Base, 80 km (50 mi) east of the station. It is one of the four radio stations along France's north–south axis, in constant communication with three others: Lacaune, Henrichemont and Rochefort air base. The station is mainly used for transmissions relating to the command of operational units. If French nuclear weapons (force de dissuasion) were used, the fire order might pass through this relay.

The station has been part of the Commandement Air des Systèmes de Surveillance d'Information et de Communications (Air Command of Surveillance, Information and Communication Systems) since its creation on 1 June 1994; from 1 January 2006, it has been run by the Direction Interarmées des Réseaux d'Infrastructure et des Systèmes d'Information (Joint Directorate of Infrastructure Networks and Information Systems).

== Infrastructure ==
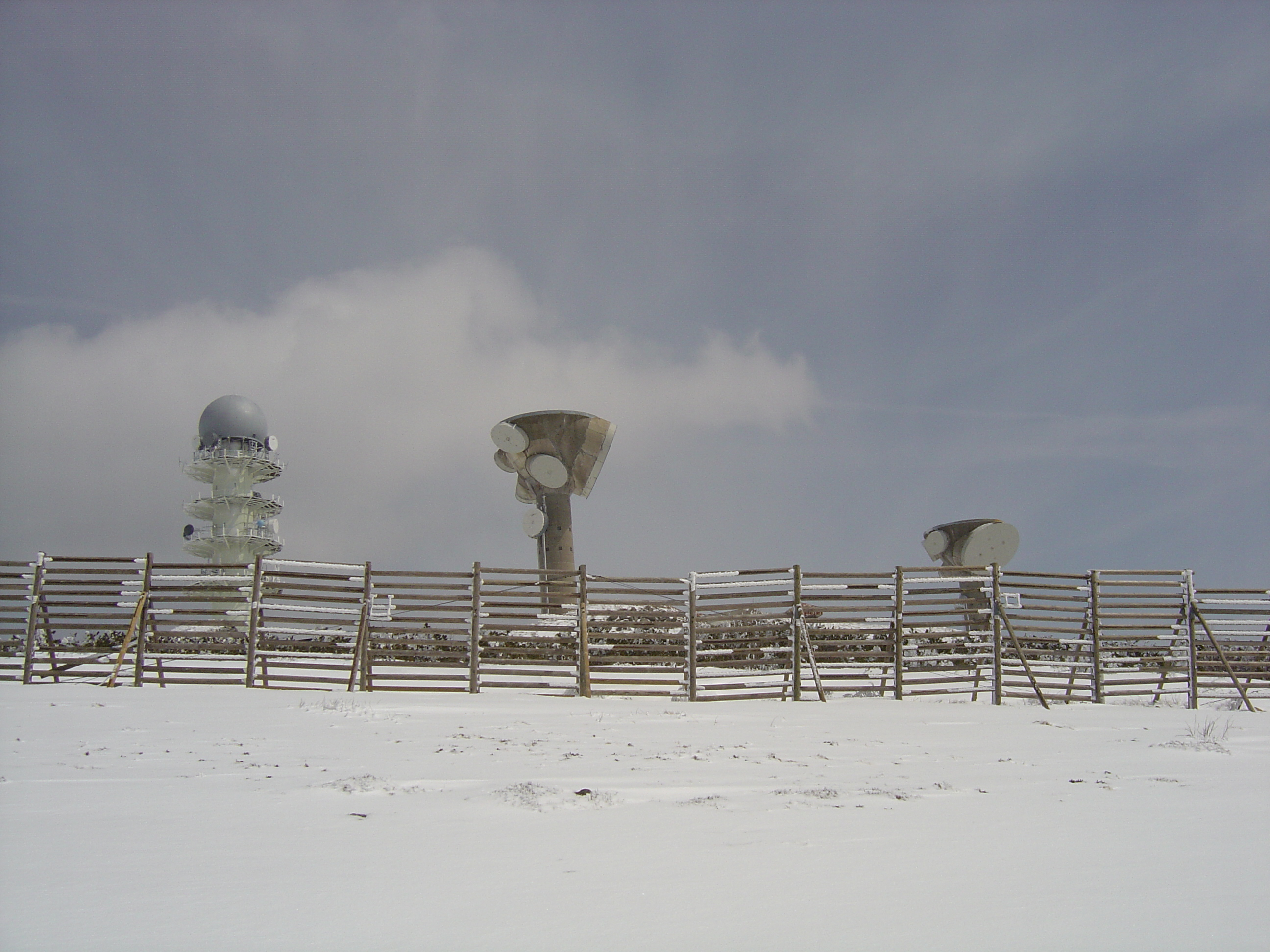
Concrete towers housing the military radio equipment at Pierre-sur-Haute

The station is situated on a 30-hectare (74-acre) site between the communes of Sauvain and Job, straddling the border between the two departments of Loire and Puy-de-Dôme. The perimeter is surrounded by a high barrier of wood and metal.

=== Buildings ===
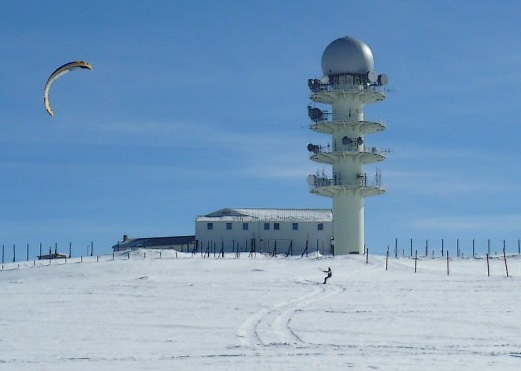
The radio station with a snowkite in the foreground

There are three towers at the site. The tallest one is a 55-metre (180 ft) high civilian telecommunication tower, owned by Télédiffusion de France. The telecommunication tower is topped by a radome and contains a mode S air traffic control radar beacon system owned by the Directorate General for Civil Aviation. The radar has been in operation since 18 August 2009 but has experienced malfunctions due to heavy snowfall in the area. The two remaining concrete towers are owned by the military. The 30-metre (98 ft) high structures have been used since 1991 for radio transmission and reception. These are built to withstand the blast of a nuclear explosion.

Some buildings are used as garages and living quarters, complete with kitchen, dining room and bedrooms. They are linked together by tunnels, 400 metres (1,300 ft) in total length, so as to avoid walking through thick snow in winter when moving from one building to the other. About 20 personnel are stationed on-site, including electricians, mechanics, and cooks.

=== Underground facilities ===
The most important part of the site is the underground section, used for transmissions dispatch: at a speed of 2 Mb/s, communications from the towers are analysed, then redirected to be transmitted. This part of the facility is supplied with chemical, biological, radiological, and nuclear defences. It defends against electromagnetic pulses using a Faraday cage. Positively pressured rooms help prevent contaminants from entering the facility. The facility has independent water and power supplies.

== Censorship on Wikipedia and unwanted attention ==
In March 2013, the French interior intelligence agency DCRI made a request for deletion of the French-language Wikipedia article about the Pierre-sur-Haute military radio station, titled Station hertzienne militaire de Pierre sur Haute. The Wikimedia Foundation then asked the DCRI which parts of the article were causing a problem, noting that the article closely reflected information in a 2004 documentary made by Télévision Loire 7, a French local television station, a film not only freely available online but made with the cooperation of the French Air Force.

The DCRI then forced Rémi Mathis, a volunteer administrator of the French-language Wikipedia and president of Wikimedia France, under threat of detention and arrest, to delete the article. The article was promptly restored by another Wikipedia contributor living in Switzerland. As a result of the controversy, the article temporarily became the most-read page on the French Wikipedia, with more than 120,000 page views during the weekend of 6–7 April 2013. The high amount of extra attention was noted as an example of the Streisand effect in action. Mathis was named Wikipedian of the Year by Jimmy Wales at Wikimania 2013.
