= Gimar Montaz Mautino =

French aerial lift manufacturer

- Industry: manufacture of lifting and handling equipment
- Founded: 5 June 1987
- Founder: Pierre Montaz, Victor Mautino, Bernard Drevet
- Headquarters: Échirolles
- Products: Ski lifts and chair lifts
- Website: www.gmm-france.com

Gimar Montaz Mautino (GMM) is a French manufacturer that was created by the merger of Gimar (founded in 5. June 1980 by Jean-Claude Giraud and Dominique Marceau, two former executives at Weber) and Montaz-Mautino (founded in 1952 by Pierre Montaz and Victor Mautino). They make aerial lifts (mostly two-seat chairlifts) and surface ski lifts. They are headquartered in Échirolles France, near Grenoble. Originally known as Montaz-Mautino, they were one of the most successful ski lift companies in the 1970s and 1980s, primarily constructing two and three-seat chairlifts.

The current form of the company dates back to 1990, when the Gimar company, then headed by industrialist Bernard Drevet, obtained the Montaz-Mautino company after its judicial liquidation by the judgment of Grenoble's commercial court in December 1989.

The Montaz-Mautino company was founded 40 years earlier by Pierre Montaz and Victor Mautino in the commune of Fontaine, Isère. They ceased their activities within the company between 1986 and 1987. Its activities covered various fields such as ski lifts, fixed-grip chairlifts, detachable-grip chairlifts, gondolas, and cable cars. In particular, in 1987 it built the Brévent cable car in Chamonix-Mont-Blanc.

The Gimar company was created by Messrs Giraud and Marceau at the end of the 1970s. Activities (until 1988) were generally focused on the production of industrial cable transport devices, with some attempts in the tourist sector. The purchase of the company by Bernard Drevet in 1988 gave it new life.

Since 1994, the company is certified according to the standard NF EN ISO 9001.

The company was experiencing difficulties due to site hazards in India and was bought in 1994 by Didier Serre, a Lyon businessman. He appointed the head of GMM François Montes, former Secretary-General of Lafuma, to conduct a responsible policy. After these turbulent times, the manufacturer refocused on making chairlifts and ski lifts, its historic know-how, and after the sales service of the previous-Montaz Mautino and Gimar installation. It is currently managed by Gilles Kraan.

== Products ==
GMM mainly builds four-seater fixed-attachment chairlifts and roller or pole-mounted ski-lifts and provides after-sales service on old products designed by the two former companies Montaz-Mautino and Gimar. Although it is not as well known as other major aerial lift manufacturers (Doppelmayr, Leitner, and Poma), GMM has manufactured more than 2,500 aerial lifts on 5 continents, including nearly 780 in France. The company strives to limit the ecological footprint of its ski lifts by using demountable structures and recycled elements.

The current range of GMM chairlifts is based on 7+ stations and mini 7 of motor type or motor-voltage compacts (on massive concrete). 7+ The first copy was made in 1998 at the Alpe d'Huez: this is the Lievre Blanc chairlift.

GMM retains also to catalog a range of lifts with poles (fixed and detachable). Although they are now less popular, they are historical know-how of the company since as Montaz Mautino, then as GMM, the manufacturer has made the territory more than 600 slope-back of its kind since the 1950s, the company has modernized the same range with the design of 4 new types of stations S whose first units were delivered in 2005.

However, the manufacturer now offers lifts retractors. GMM has developed for this purpose a so-called range E (as winders) with 3 different driving-voltage terminals; the lighter is sized to fit devices for beginners, the heart of the product target. The first aircraft of this range is the lift of Daffodils, installed in 2010 to Parlour in the Fore (Massif Central).

Retractors are models that have the particularity of being magnetic braking plates. Until 2015, they came from the manufacturer Loipolder Seilbahn Technik. Since 2016, GMM has its reel, developed by the internal design department.

Best seen in the resort of Puy-Saint-Vincent as well as gondolas and surface lifts (similar in design to POMA surface lifts). Though in recent years, due to the rapid growth of rivals POMA and Leitner in France, Montaz Mautino lifts are being replaced with faster and higher capacity lifts from its rivals. GMM still constructs surface lifts and a completely new design of 4 person chairlift.
