= Saint-Pierre-la-Bourlhonne =

- Commune
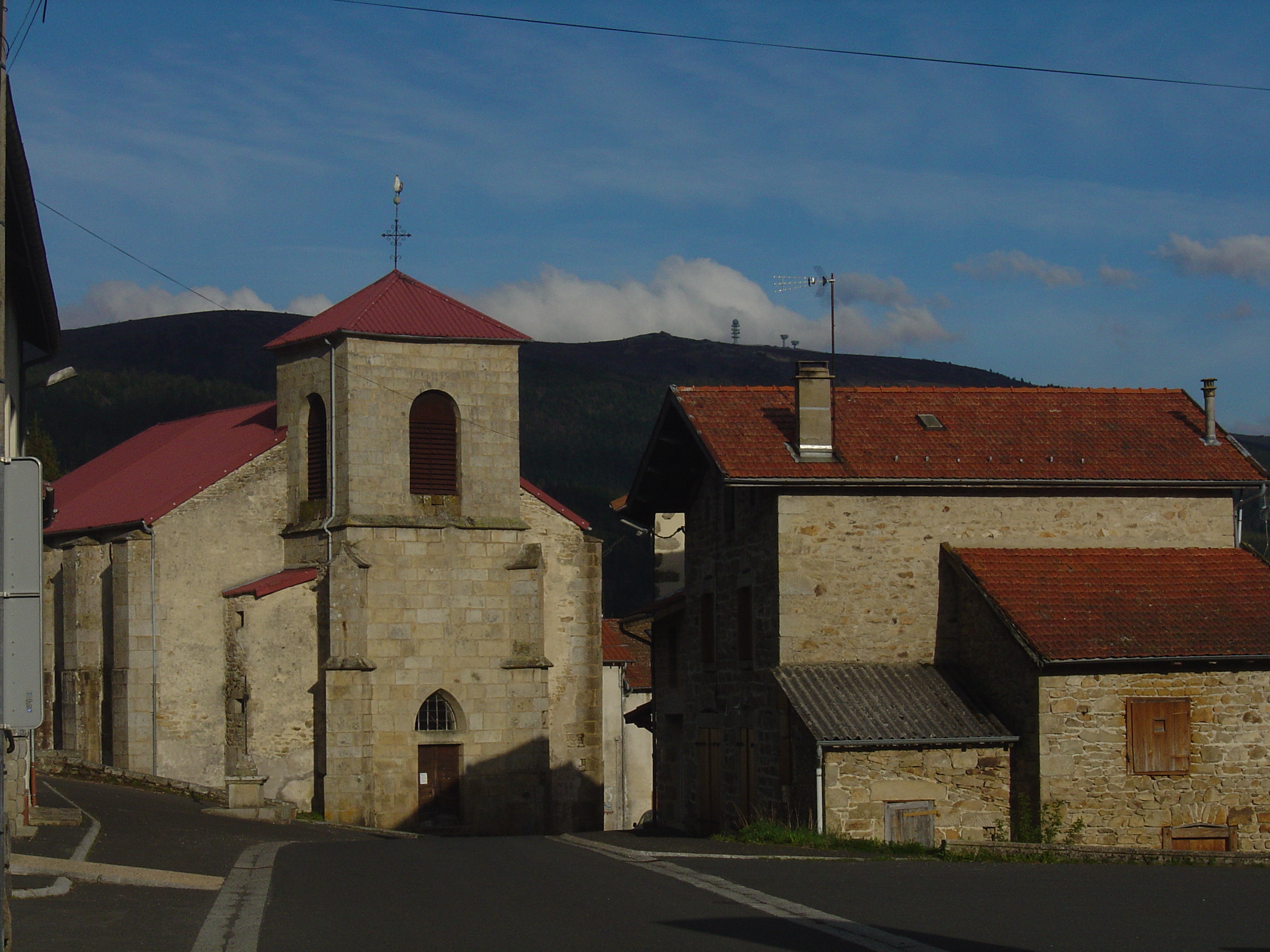
- The church in Saint-Pierre-la-Bourlhonne
- Location of Saint-Pierre-la-Bourlhonne
- Location within France Location within Auvergne-Rhône-Alpes
- Coordinates: 45°40′30″N 3°44′38″E
- Country: France
- Region: Auvergne-Rhône-Alpes
- Department: Puy-de-Dôme
- Arrondissement: Ambert
- Canton: Les Monts du Livradois

Government
  - Mayor (2020–2026): Philippe Bernard
- Area^{1}: 11.89 km^{2} (4.59 sq mi)
- Elevation: 980 m (3,220 ft)
- Highest elevation: 1,542 m (5,059 ft)
- Lowest elevation: 688 m (2,257 ft)
- Population (2023): 136
  - Density: 11.4/km^{2} (29.6/sq mi)
- Time zone: UTC+01:00 (CET)
  - Summer (DST): UTC+02:00 (CEST)
- INSEE/Postal code: 63384 /63480
- ^{1} French Land Register data, which excludes lakes, ponds, glaciers > 1 km^{2} (0.386 sq mi or 247 acres) and river estuaries.

Saint-Pierre-la-Bourlhonne (Auvergnat: Sent Pèire de la Borlhona) is a commune in the Puy-de-Dôme département in Auvergne in central France.

== See also ==
- Communes of the Puy-de-Dôme department
