= Sauvain =

- Commune
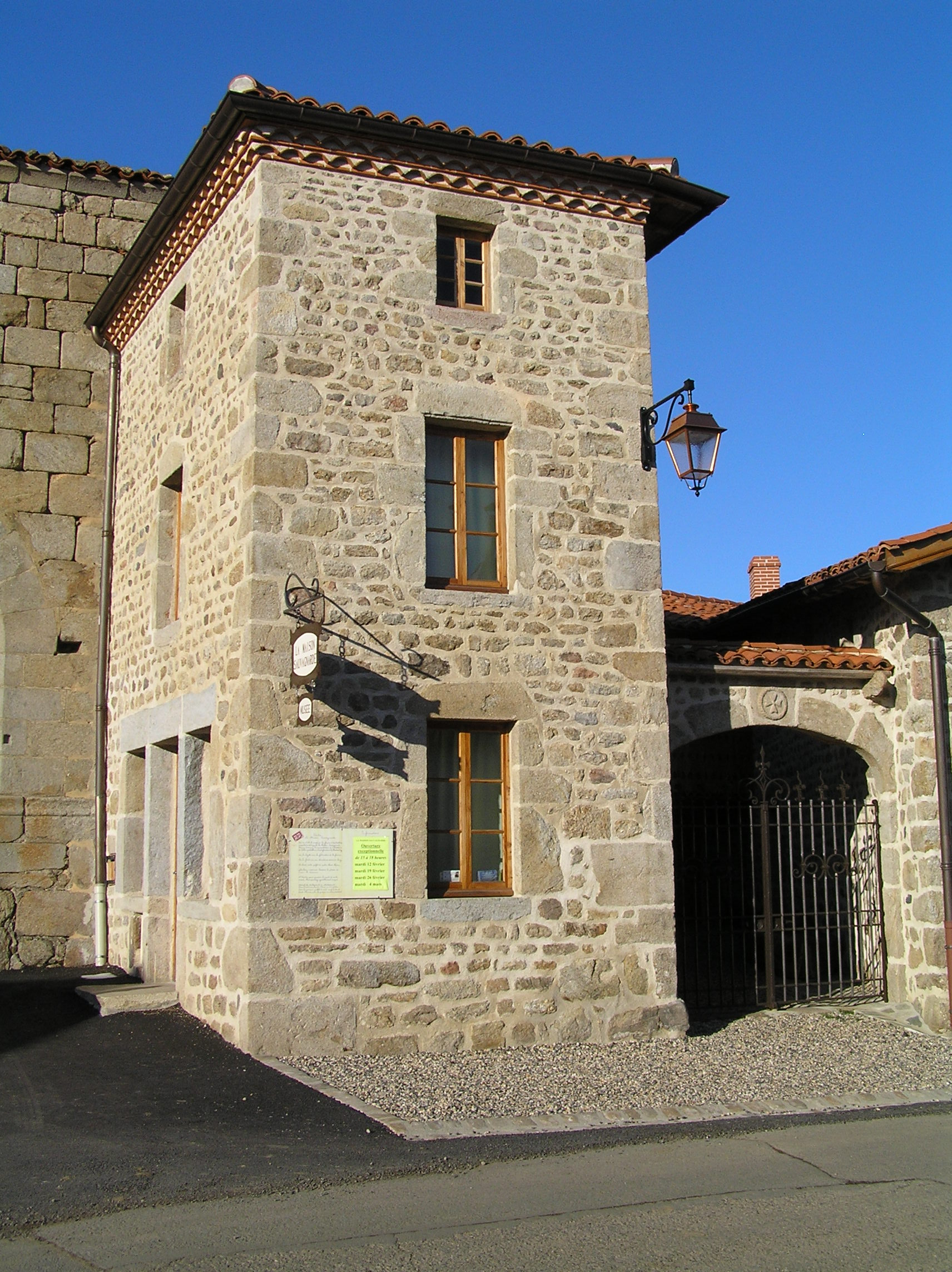
- Museum
- Location of Sauvain
- Location within France Location within Auvergne-Rhône-Alpes
- Coordinates: 45°40′27″N 3°54′23″E
- Country: France
- Region: Auvergne-Rhône-Alpes
- Department: Loire
- Arrondissement: Montbrison
- Canton: Boën-sur-Lignon
- Intercommunality: Loire Forez Agglomération

Government
  - Mayor (2020–2026): Jean-René Joandel
- Area^{1}: 30.23 km^{2} (11.67 sq mi)
- Elevation: 890 m (2,920 ft)
- Highest elevation: 1,631 m (5,351 ft)
- Lowest elevation: 640 m (2,100 ft)
- Population (2023): 371
  - Density: 12.3/km^{2} (31.8/sq mi)
- Time zone: UTC+01:00 (CET)
  - Summer (DST): UTC+02:00 (CEST)
- INSEE/Postal code: 42298 /42990
- ^{1} French Land Register data, which excludes lakes, ponds, glaciers > 1 km^{2} (0.386 sq mi or 247 acres) and river estuaries.

Sauvain (French pronunciation: [sovɛ̃], Arpitan: Sâlveng, [suˈveːɪ], or Sâlving, [suˈvĩ]) is a commune in the French department of Loire, Auvergne-Rhône-Alpes, central France. Its church is l'Église Notre Dame de la Nativité.

== Geography ==
The river Lignon du Forez flows through the commune.

== Population ==
Historical population
Year	Pop.	±% p.a.
1968	611	—
1975	523	−2.20%
1982	507	−0.44%
1990	445	−1.62%
1999	429	−0.41%
2007	410	−0.56%
2012	386	−1.20%
2017	380	−0.31%
2023	371	−0.40%
Source: INSEE

== See also ==
- Communes of the Loire department
- Military radio station of Pierre-sur-Haute
