= Forez mountains =

French mountain region

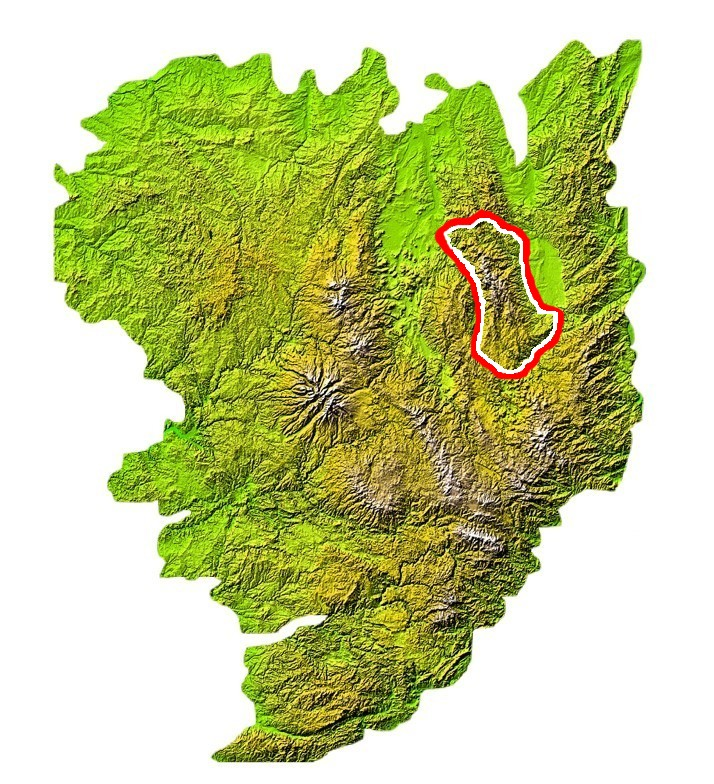
- Location map of Forez mountains in the Massif Central.

Highest point
- Elevation: 1,631 m (5,351 ft) at Pierre-sur-Haute
- Coordinates: 45.653472°N 3.808393°E

Geography
- Location: Auvergne-Rhône-Alpes, France
- Parent range: Massif Central

The Forez mountains (French: Monts du Forez, pronounced [mɔ̃ dy fɔʁɛ]) are a mountain range in the Massif Central separating the Dore valley from the Forez plain. They reach their highest point at Pierre-sur-Haute, with an altitude of 1,631 meters.

== Geography ==
=== Location ===
The Forez mountains are located in the departments of Loire, Haute-Loire, and Puy-de-Dôme. The massif is situated northwest of the city of Saint-Étienne and southeast of Thiers. It overlooks the Forez plain (to the east) and the Dore valley (to the west).

=== Geology ===
The base of the Forez mountains consists of igneous rocks (granites) and metamorphic rocks (gneiss). The formation of the range occurred during the Paleozoic Era. In the Tertiary Period, the Alpine cycle created the current landscape with mountains and valleys. This episode ended with a Miocene volcanic phase. The Quaternary glaciations then eroded the landscape to give it its present form.

=== Fauna and flora ===
The Forez mountains form a diverse natural environment where a marked stratification of different biotopes can be distinguished. The lower stage, of mountainous type, is formed by relatively dense pine forests and beech and fir forests, interspersed with mountainous agricultural areas, mainly dedicated to livestock farming. Beyond 1,400 meters, this gives way to vast high-altitude plateaus: the "Hautes Chaumes." This subalpine stage consists of moorlands dotted with peat bogs.

== Activities ==
=== Cutlery ===
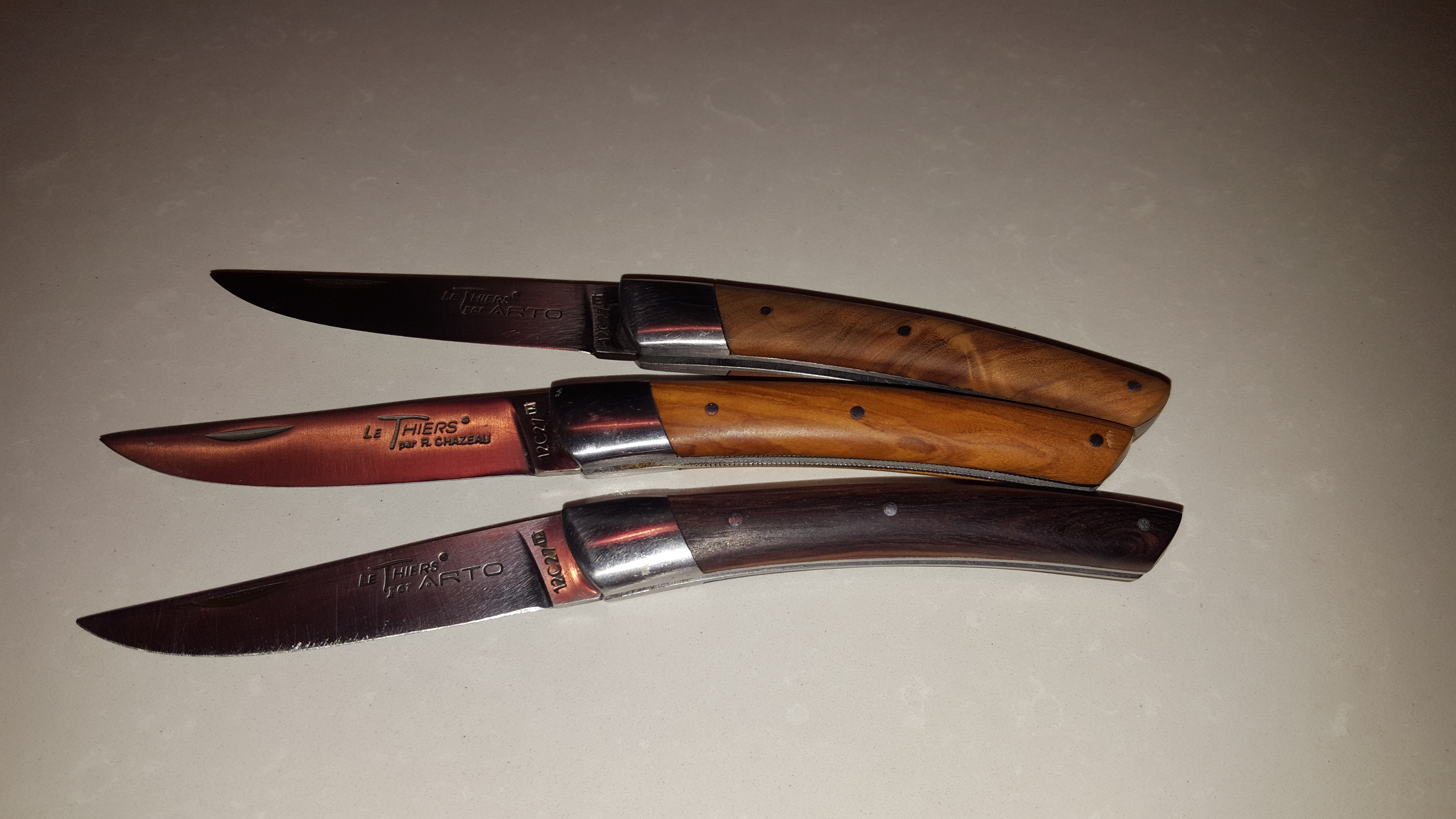
Three Le Thiers knives, entirely made in the Thiers basin.

Cutlery is a major activity in the northwest of the Forez mountains. Thiers is the cutlery capital of France, and its region, which includes the Durolle valley, is the largest cutlery-producing area in the world.

=== Environmental protection ===
The western slope of the Forez mountain range, in the Puy-de-Dôme department, is part of the Livradois-Forez Regional Natural Park. On July 27, 2011, during the revision of its charter, five communes from the Loire department also joined the park.
