= Marie Therese Vauzou =

French catholic nun (1825–1907)

Marie-Thérèse Vauzou
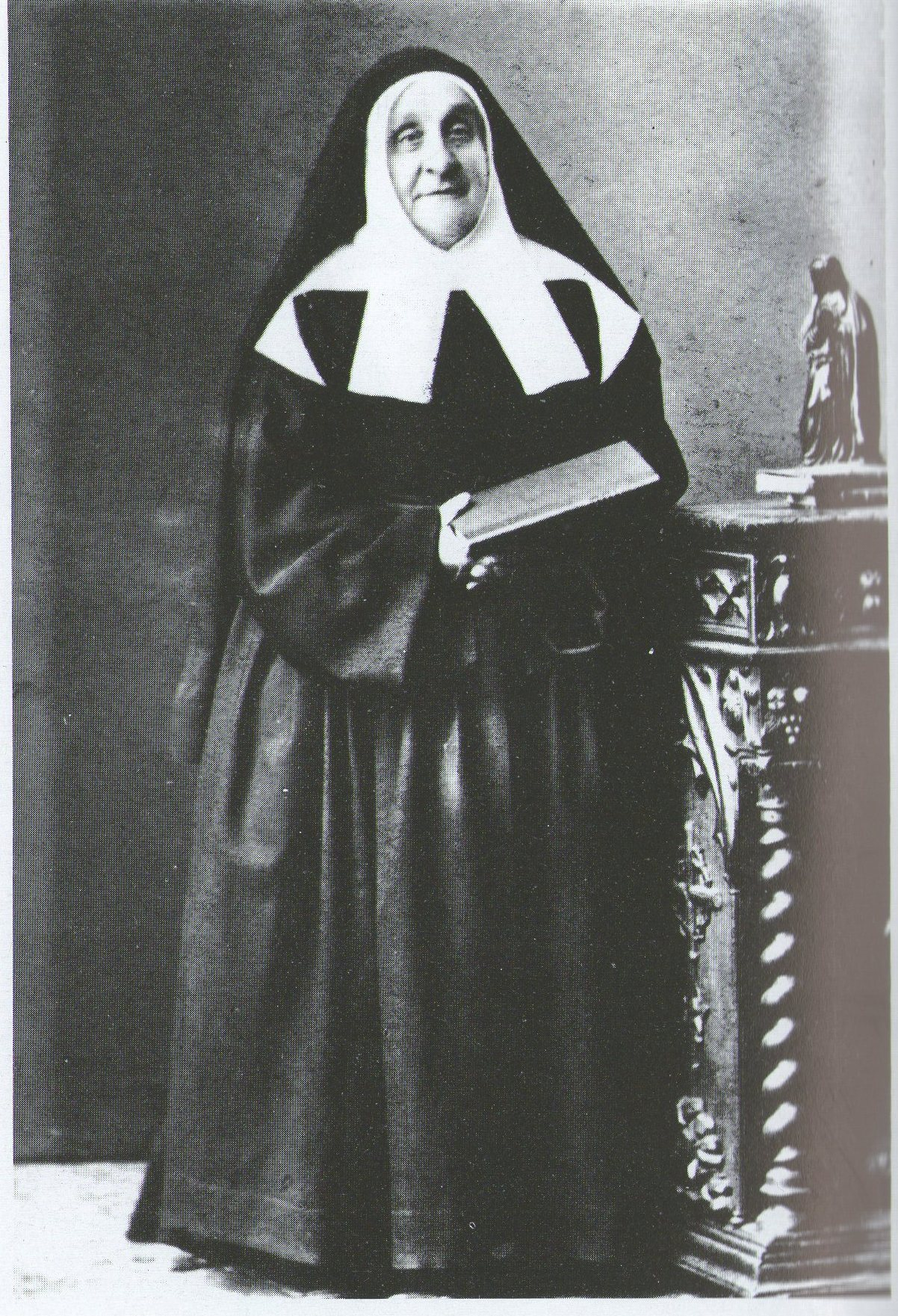
- Born: August 10, 1825; Collonges-la-Rouge, France
- Died: February 15, 1907 (aged 81); Lourdes, France

Marie-Thérèse Vauzou (August 10, 1825 – February 15, 1907) was a French Catholic nun who is known as having been the Mistress of Novices and later Mother Superior of the Sisters of Charity of Nevers during Saint Bernadette Soubirous' lifetime.

== Biography ==
She was born Guillaumette Honorine in Collonges-la-Rouge, France; her father was Antoine Vauzou, a royal notary.

Vauzou rose through the ranks of the Saint Gildard Convent, and in 1861 became Mistress of Novices. A few years later, Marie-Bernard "Bernadette" Soubirous began to visit as she was interested in becoming a postulant, a process she began in 1865. Some years before in 1858, Soubirous had become famous after having said she had received apparitions of the Immaculate Conception, now known as Our Lady of Lourdes.

While Vauzou supported Soubirous joining the convent and later admitted a certain fondness and acceptance for Soubirous' "charisma and beauty", Vauzou never fully believed in the visions and treated her poorly. She also disagreed with the decision to open the cause for canonisation of Soubirous after the latter's death on 16 April 1879 at the age of 35.

Vauzou became Mother Superior, and in 1899 was forced to testify before religious officials investigating Soubirous. She said she knew Sister Bernadette better than most, having spent much time with the girl during her early years at the convent. She described Soubirous as "vain" and "simple", and asked officials to delay Bernadette's canonisation process until after her own death. Little is known about Vauzou's final years, but it is known she struggled internally with her feelings about Bernadette, visiting a monk at the Fontfroide Abbey who helped her regain spiritual peace and some closure after Bernadette's death.

Vauzou died in 1907, and is buried on the grounds of the motherhouse in Nevers. As per her request, the canonisation process began in earnest two years later in 1909, with Bernadette officially declared a saint by Pope Pius XI in 1933.

== Portrayal in media ==
Sister Vauzou was portrayed by English actress Gladys Cooper in the 1943 film The Song of Bernadette, which was based on Franz Werfel’s 1941 novel of the same name. Cooper was nominated for the Academy Award for Best Supporting Actress for her performance.

In the 1946 Broadway play of the same name, Sister Vauzou was portrayed by actress Jean Mann.
