= The Song of Bernadette (film) =

1943 film by Henry King

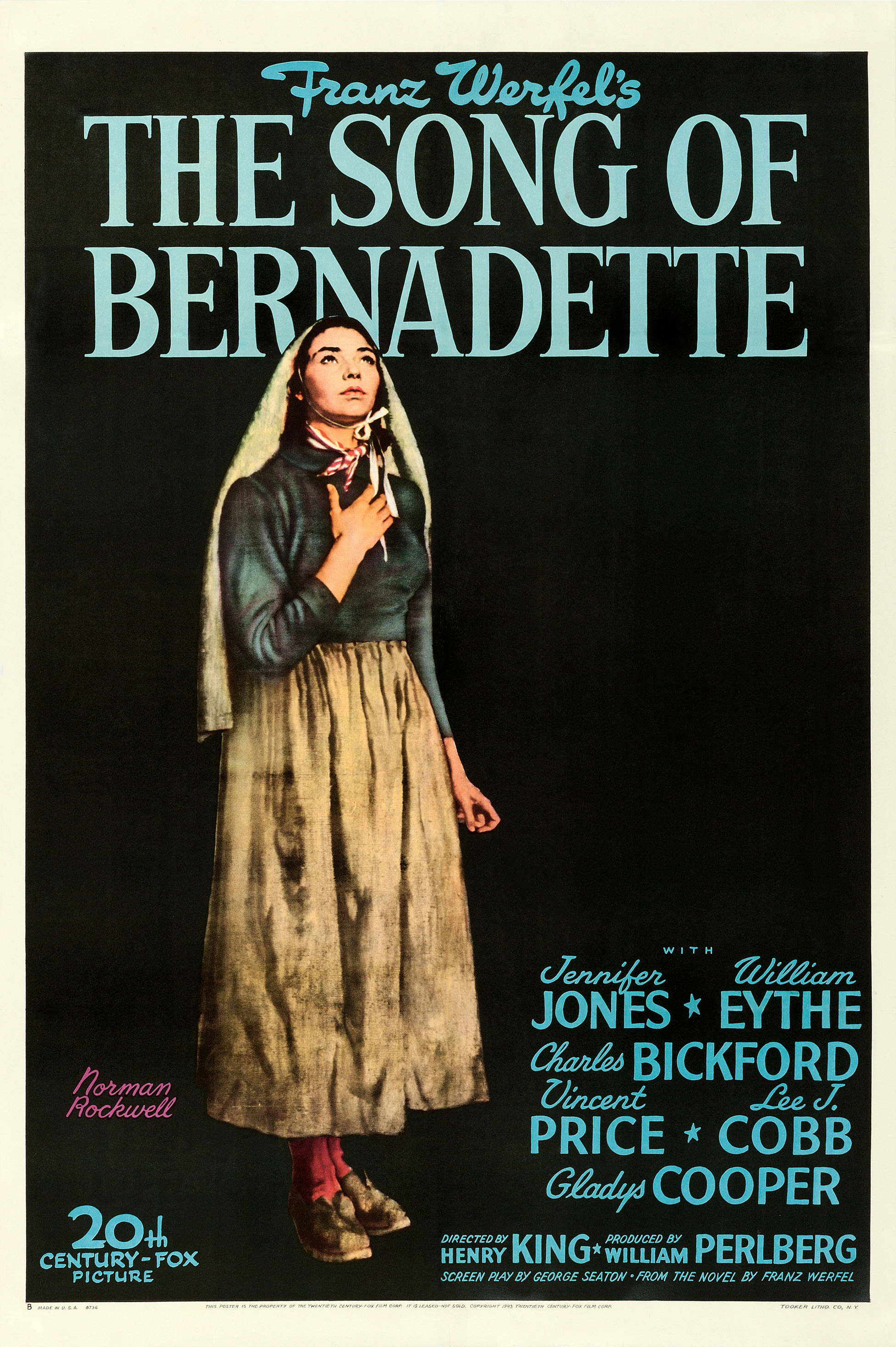
- Theatrical release poster by Norman Rockwell
- Directed by: Henry King
- Screenplay by: George Seaton
- Based on: The Song of Bernadette; 1941 book by Franz Werfel
- Produced by: William Perlberg
- Starring: Jennifer Jones; William Eythe; Charles Bickford; Vincent Price; Lee J. Cobb; Gladys Cooper
- Cinematography: Arthur C. Miller
- Edited by: Barbara McLean
- Music by: Alfred Newman
- Distributed by: 20th Century Fox
- Release date: December 25, 1943
- Running time: 155 minutes
- Country: United States
- Language: English
- Budget: $1.6 million
- Box office: $5–7 million

The Song of Bernadette is a 1943 American biographical drama film based on the 1941 novel of the same name by Franz Werfel. It stars Jennifer Jones in the title role, which portrays the story of Bernadette Soubirous, who reportedly experienced eighteen visions of the Blessed Virgin Mary from February to July 1858 and was canonized in 1933. The film was directed by Henry King, from a screenplay by George Seaton.

The novel was extremely popular, spending more than a year on The New York Times Best Seller list and thirteen weeks heading the list. The story was also turned into a Broadway play, which opened at the Belasco Theatre in March 1946.

== Plot ==
In 1858, 14-year-old Bernadette Soubirous lives in poverty with her family in Lourdes, France. She is shamed by her Catholic school teacher, Sister Vauzou, for falling behind in her studies because of her asthma. That afternoon, while fetching firewood with her sister Marie and a friend, Bernadette waits for them in the Massabielle grotto. Distracted by a strange breeze and a change in the light, Bernadette sees a beautiful lady clad in white, standing on a rock niche. Bernadette tells her companions what she saw, and they promise not to tell anyone else. However, Marie tells their mother when they return home, and the story soon spreads all over Lourdes.

Many, including Bernadette's Aunt Bernarde, are convinced of her sincerity, standing up for her against her disbelieving parents. Bernadette continues to repeatedly visit the grotto as requested by the lady, accompanied by other citizens of Lourdes. While Abbé Dominique Peyramale refuses to get involved, civil authorities threateningly interrogate Bernadette, but she confounds them with her simplicity and stands behind her story. On one visit, the lady asks Bernadette to drink and wash at a seemingly nonexistent spring. Bernadette obediently digs a hole in the ground and smears her face with dirt. Though she is initially ridiculed, water later begins to flow, which exhibits miraculous healing properties; ailing people soon begin flocking to Lourdes.

On Bernadette's last visit to the grotto, the lady finally identifies herself as the "Immaculate Conception." When civil authorities try to have Bernadette declared insane, Peyramale, who once doubted her, now becomes her staunchest ally and asks for a formal church investigation to verify if Bernadette is a fraud, insane, or genuine.

The grotto is fenced off, and the Bishop of Tarbes declares that unless the Emperor orders the grotto to open, there will be no investigation. When The Emperor's infant son is cured of his illness by water from Lourdes, the Empress demands that the grotto be reopened. The Bishop of Tarbes then directs the commission to convene. The investigation takes many years, and Bernadette is questioned again and again, but the commission eventually determines that Bernadette truly experienced the visions and was visited by the Virgin Mary.

Believing it unsuitable for her to live an ordinary life, Peyramale persuades Bernadette to join the Sisters of Charity of Nevers. Bernadette undergoes rigorous spiritual training and works hard at the convent but is also subjected to emotional abuse from Sister Vauzou, now mistress of novices at the convent. Vauzou tells Bernadette that doubt consumes her, and that she cannot believe that Bernadette, who has never suffered, would be chosen by God when she has spent her life suffering in his service.

Though Bernadette agrees that she has not suffered, she then reveals a tumor hidden under the skirt of her habit, much to Vauzou's horror. The doctor diagnoses tuberculosis of the bone; the condition causes unspeakable pain, yet Bernadette had never mentioned it. Vauzou, realizing her error, prays for forgiveness and vows to serve Bernadette for the rest of her life. Despite the severity of her illness, Bernadette refuses to partake of the grotto's healing waters.

On her deathbed, Bernadette sends for Peyramale and confesses her feelings of unworthiness while sorrowfully maintaining that she may never see the lady again. However, the lady appears in the room, smiles, and gestures to Bernadette warmly. Bernadette joyfully cries out to the apparition before finally dying. Upon her death, Peyramale remarks, "You are now in Heaven and on earth. Your life begins, O Bernadette."

== Cast ==
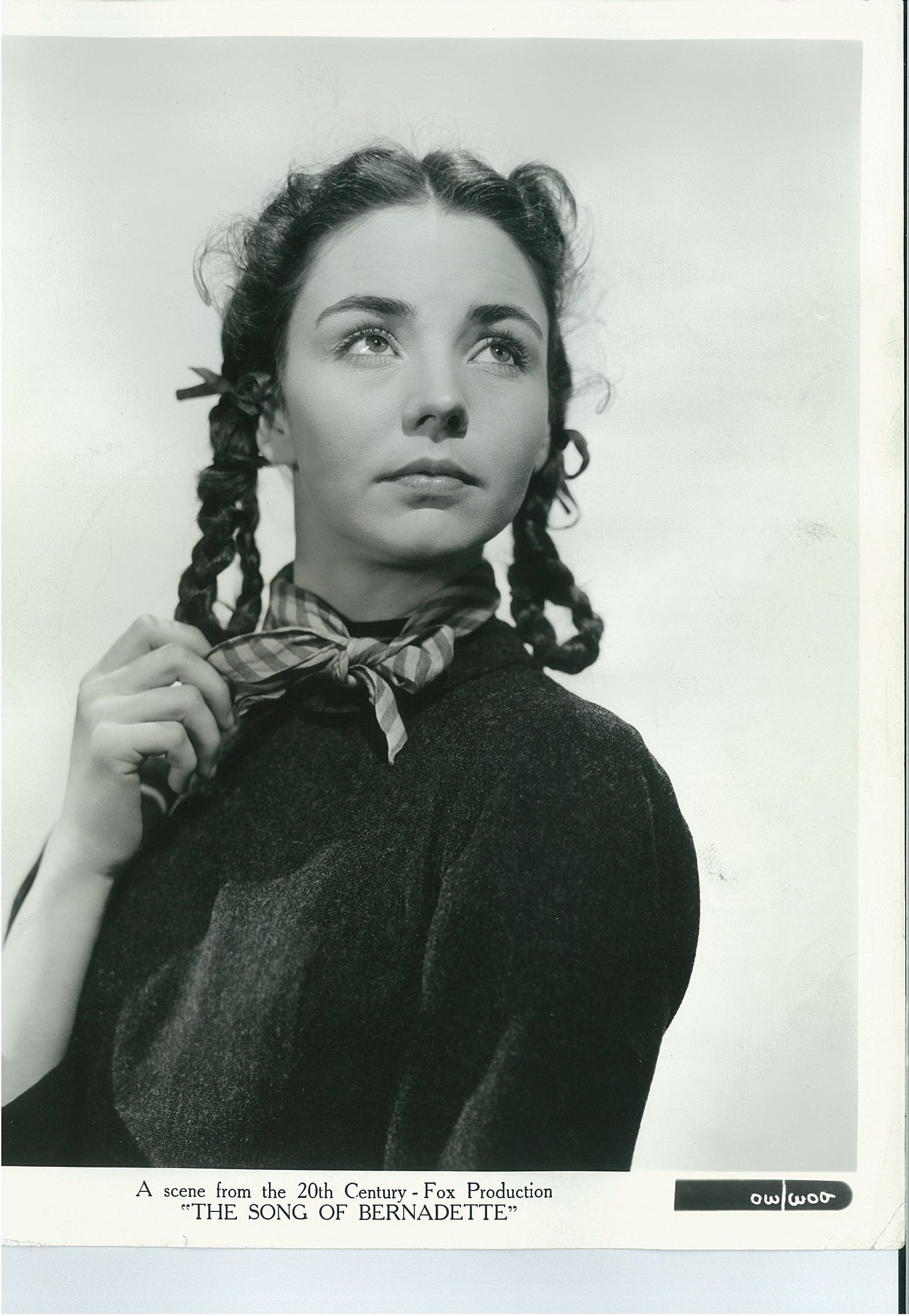
Jones as Bernadette Soubirous in The Song of Bernadette (1943)

- Jennifer Jones as Bernadette Soubirous
- Charles Bickford as Abbé Dominique Peyramale
- William Eythe as Antoine Nicoleau
- Gladys Cooper as Marie Therese Vauzou, Bernadette's schoolteacher and later the Mistress of Novices
- Vincent Price as Vital Dutour, Imperial Prosecutor
- Lee J. Cobb as Dr. Dozous
- Anne Revere as Louise Casterot Soubirous, Bernadette's mother
- Roman Bohnen as François Soubirous, Bernadette's father
- Mary Anderson as Jeanne Abadie, Bernadette's friend
- Patricia Morison as Empress Eugenie
- Jerome Cowan as Emperor Napoleon III
- Aubrey Mather as Mayor Lacade
- Charles Dingle as Jacomet, chief of police
- Edith Barrett as Croisine Bouhouhorts
- Sig Ruman as Louis Bouriette
- Blanche Yurka as Bernarde Casterot, Bernadette's aunt
- Ermadean Walters as Marie Soubirous, Bernadette's sister
- Marcel Dalio as Callet
- Pedro de Cordoba as Dr. LeCramps
- Eula Morgan as Madame Nicoleau
- Fortunio Bonanova as Imperial Prince Louis (uncredited)
- Harry Cording as Stonemason (uncredited)
- Linda Darnell as the Immaculate Conception (uncredited)
- Alan Napier as Dr. Debeau, the psychiatrist (uncredited)
- Frank Reicher as Dr. St. Cyr (uncredited)
- Edward Van Sloan as Doctor (uncredited)
- Dickie Moore as Adulard Bouhouhorts age 15 (uncredited)
- William Smith as Sleeping Boy on the Trek

== Historical accuracy ==
The film's plot follows the novel by Franz Werfel, which is not a documentary but a historical novel blending fact and fiction. Bernadette's real-life friend Antoine Nicolau is portrayed as being deeply in love with her and vowing to remain unmarried when Bernadette enters the convent. No such relationship is documented as existing between them. In addition, the government authorities, in particular, Imperial Prosecutor Vital Dutour (played by Vincent Price) are portrayed as being much more anti-religion than they actually were; in fact, Dutour was himself a devout Catholic who simply thought Bernadette was hallucinating. Other portrayals come closer to historical accuracy, particularly Anne Revere and Roman Bohnen as Bernadette's overworked parents, Charles Bickford as Father Peyramale (although his presence at Bernadette's deathbed was an artistic embellishment; in reality, Peyramale had died a few years before Bernadette), and Blanche Yurka as formidable Aunt Bernarde.

The portrayal of Sister Marie Therese Vauzou is also inaccurate. There is no evidence that Sister Vazou was Bernadette's elementary school teacher or that they met prior to the time that Bernadette entered the convent.

The film combines the characters of Vital Dutour and the man of letters Hyacinthe de La Fite, who appears in the novel and believes he has cancer of the larynx. La Fite does not appear at all in the movie. In the film, it is Dutour who is dying of cancer of the larynx at the end, and who goes to the Lourdes shrine, kneels at the gates to the grotto and says, "Pray for me, Bernadette."

The film ends with the death of Bernadette and does not mention the exhumation of her body or her canonization, as the novel does.

== Music ==
Igor Stravinsky was initially informally approached to write the film score. On February 15, 1943, he started writing music for the "Apparition of the Virgin" scene. However, the studio never approved a contract with Stravinsky, and the project went to Alfred Newman, who won an Oscar. The music Stravinsky had written for the film made its way into the second movement of his Symphony in Three Movements.

== Reception ==
Bosley Crowther of The New York Times gave the movie a mostly negative review, praising the acting, especially Jones's, but regretting the movie's "tedious and repetitious" narrative, its emphasis on "images that lack visual mobility" and "dialectic discourse that will clutter and fatigue the average mind," and the decision to make Bernadette's "lady" visible to viewers.

On the review aggregator website Rotten Tomatoes, 88% of 16 critics' reviews are positive, with an average rating of 6.8/10.

== Awards and nominations ==
Award	Category	Nominee(s)	Result	Ref.
Academy Awards	Outstanding Motion Picture	William Perlberg (for 20th Century Fox)	Nominated	
Academy Awards	Best Director	Henry King	Nominated	
Academy Awards	Best Actress	Jennifer Jones	Won	
Academy Awards	Best Supporting Actor	Charles Bickford	Nominated	
Academy Awards	Best Supporting Actress	Gladys Cooper	Nominated	
Academy Awards	Best Supporting Actress	Anne Revere	Nominated	
Academy Awards	Best Screenplay	George Seaton	Nominated	
Academy Awards	Best Art Direction–Interior Decoration – Black-and-White	Art Direction: James Basevi and William S. Darling; Interior Decoration: Thomas Little	Won	
Academy Awards	Best Cinematography – Black-and-White	Arthur C. Miller	Won	
Academy Awards	Best Film Editing	Barbara McLean	Nominated	
Academy Awards	Best Scoring of a Dramatic or Comedy Picture	Alfred Newman	Won	
Academy Awards	Best Sound Recording	Edmund H. Hansen	Nominated	
Golden Globe Awards	Best Picture		Won	
Golden Globe Awards	Best Actress in a Leading Role	Jennifer Jones	Won	
Golden Globe Awards	Best Director	Henry King	Won	
National Board of Review Awards	Top Ten Films		5th Place	

== Radio adaptation ==
The Song of Bernadette was presented on Hollywood Star Time April 21, 1946. The 30-minute adaptation starred Vincent Price, Lee J. Cobb, Pedro DeCordoba, and Vanessa Brown.

== See also ==
- Lourdes apparitions
- "Song of Bernadette" (song)
- The Village of St. Bernadette
