= The Song of Bernadette (novel) =

1942 novel by Franz Werfel

- First UK edition (published by Hamish Hamilton, 1942)
- Author: Franz Werfel
- Subject: Bernadette Soubirous; Our Lady of Lourdes; Lourdes apparitions Lourdes water

The Song of Bernadette (German: Das Lied von Bernadette) is a 1941 novel that tells the story of Saint Bernadette Soubirous, who, from February to July 1858 reported eighteen visions of the Blessed Virgin Mary in Lourdes, France. The novel was written by Franz Werfel and translated into English by Lewis Lewisohn in 1942. It was extremely popular, spending more than a year on the New York Times Best Seller list and 13 weeks in first place.

The novel was adapted into the 1943 film The Song of Bernadette, starring Jennifer Jones.

== Origins ==
Franz Werfel was a German-speaking Jew born in Prague in 1890. He became well known as a playwright. In the 1930s in Vienna, he began writing popular satirical plays lampooning the Nazi regime until the Anschluss, when the Third Reich under Adolf Hitler annexed Austria in 1938. Werfel and his wife Alma (Gustav Mahler's widow) fled to Paris until the Germans invaded France in 1940.

In his Personal Preface to The Song of Bernadette, Franz Werfel takes up the story:

In the last days of June 1940, in flight after the collapse of France, the two of us, my wife and I, had hoped to elude our mortal enemies in time to cross the Spanish frontier to Portugal, but had to flee back to the interior of France on the very night German troops occupied the frontier town of Hendaye. The Pyrenean départements had turned into a phantasmagoria – a very camp of chaos.

This strange migration of people wandered about on the roads in their thousands obstructing towns and villages: Frenchmen, Belgians, Dutchmen, Poles, Czechs, Austrians, exiled Germans; and, mingled with these, soldiers of the defeated armies. There was barely food enough to still the extreme pangs of hunger. There was no shelter to be had. Anyone who had obtained possession of an upholstered chair for his night's rest was an object of envy. In endless lines, stood the cars of the fugitives, piled high with household gear, with mattresses and beds. There was no petrol to be had.

A family settled in Pau told us that Lourdes was the one place where, if luck were kind, one might find a roof. Since Lourdes was but thirty kilometres distant, we were advised to make the attempt and knock on its gates. We followed this advice and found refuge at last in the little town of Lourdes in the foothills of the Pyrenees.

Hunted by the Gestapo, the Werfels experienced anxiety for their hosts as well as themselves. A number of families took turns in giving them shelter. These people told the Werfels the story of Bernadette. Werfel vowed that, if he and his wife escaped, he would put off all tasks and write Bernadette's story into a novel.

== Plot ==
The story is about an intense love between Bernadette and “the lady” of her vision. Bernadette's love for the lady attains “ecstasy” when in her presence at a grotto near Lourdes: she is so intently focused that she sees and hears nothing of her everyday surroundings. The love she feels sustains her throughout the trials which she is made to endure by doubters and by public officials who see her as a threat to the established order, which is based on a secular milieu.

The lady guides Bernadette to the discovery of a stream which springs from beneath the ground of the grotto. The curative powers of the water are discovered by various town folk, and the word is spread by them. Bernadette does no proselytizing; to her, this experience is about her relationship, and she insists she does not know who the lady is.

The lady asks Bernadette to "go to the priests" to tell them of her wishes to have a chapel built on the site of the grotto, and to have processions to the site. Bernadette obeys, informing church and secular officials about this message, taking no other action. Eventually, partly due to some individuals' strong belief in the girl's visions and partly due to town officials' enlightened self-interest, the chapel is approved. Bernadette does not actively cultivate a following—in fact, she dislikes all the attention—but people are attracted to her by the love she radiates and by witnessing the ecstatic trance she experiences when she has visions of the lady at the grotto.

Bernadette does no preaching or evangelizing, only repeats what the lady says; but her behavior of itself converts doubters, and the very church officials who once doubted her become her protectors and advocates. Eventually the lady tells her "I am the Immaculate Conception." After eighteen visitations, the lady says farewell, and Bernadette expects to go through a normal life, but eventually enters the convent of the Sisters of Charity of Nevers. Although she is dying of tuberculosis, she refuses to seek a cure from the lady, or to drink the curative water. She is canonized several years after her death.

The story of Bernadette Soubirous and Our Lady of Lourdes is told by Werfel with many embellishments, such as the chapter in which Bernadette is invited to board at the home of a rich woman who thinks Bernadette's visionary "lady" might be her deceased daughter. In side-stories and back story, the history of the town of Lourdes, the contemporary political situation in France, and the responses of believers and detractors are delineated. Werfel describes Bernadette as a religious peasant girl who would have preferred to continue on with an ordinary life, but takes the veil as a nun after she is told that because "Heaven chose her", she must choose Heaven. Bernadette's service as a sacristan, artist-embroiderer, and nurse in the convent are depicted, along with her spiritual growth. After her death, her body as well as her life are scrutinized for indications that she is a saint, and at last she is canonized.

The novel is laid out in five sections of ten chapters each, in a deliberate nod to the Catholic Rosary.

Unusual for a novel, the entire first part, which describes the events on the day that Bernadette first saw the Virgin Mary, is told in the present tense, as if it were happening at the moment. The rest of the novel is in the past tense.

== Major themes ==
Werfel presents Bernadette as a simple and pious girl from a poor family, who is regarded as stupid by her teachers, classmates, and authorities. He also depicts her as having inner strength and personal integrity, which is unshaken by those who challenge her stories of the "Lady of Massabielle" whom she alone can see. Bernadette is not a crusader, but the local people take up the cause of turning the grotto into a spiritual site, although the local authorities resist at first. This drama is played out against the larger canvas of French politics and the contemporary social climate. Explanatory digressions illustrate what Werfel perceives as an ongoing conflict between a human need to believe in the supernatural or in anomalous phenomena; a true religion, which should not address such "popular" manifestations; and the ideas of the Enlightenment and of atheism.

== References to history, geography and current science ==
Apparently, Werfel obtained accounts of Bernadette from Lourdes families whose older members had known her. It is possible that a great deal of folklore and legend had been added to the plain facts by the time Werfel heard the tale.

Lourdes pilgrims often want to know more about Bernadette and do not realize that, far from being a simple-minded shepherdess, she was a self-possessed young woman who stood by her story in the face of tough church and government inquiry. Werfel was able to work this aspect of her personality into his narration.

However, Werfel was not above fictionalization to fill in details or romanticize her story. He embellished the anti-religious feeling of the prosecutor, Vital Dutour (who, according to one source, altered Bernadette's answers to his questions to make her sound more visionary), and transformed the relationship between Bernadette and Antoine Nicolau from one of friendship to one of unrequited love on Nicolau's part; when she leaves Lourdes to become a nun, he vows never to wed.

Werfel's work also features a highly dramatic and fictionalized death scene. In the book, Bernadette cries out in a loud, strong voice, "J'aime (I love)" followed by a whispered "Now and in the hour..." before her voice fails; the point of view characters are a) Sister Marie Thérèse Vauzous, Bernadette's former elementary school teacher, who has already discarded her initial skepticism in light of Bernadette's horrific illness and the fact that she concealed it; the power of Bernadette's cry of love and transfigured expression convinces her that Bernadette's Lady is present in the room and b) Father Marie Dominique Peyramale, who is revitalized physically and spiritually by Bernadette's death.

In real life, however, Bernadette was in torment during the last day of her life, asking the other nuns to pray for her soul, and her last words—said twice—were "Holy Mary, Mother of God, pray for me, a poor sinner," from the Hail Mary prayer. Following this, according to Sister Nathalie Portat, she made the sign of the cross, drank a few drops of water and died.

While Marie Thérèse Vauzous was in charge of the novices at the monastery of Nevers where Bernadette was cloistered, she was neither the daughter of a general nor Bernadette's former schoolteacher. Bernadette first met her at Nevers. And the historic Dean Marie Dominique Peyramale had been dead for about a year and a half by the time that Bernadette herself died on 16 April 1879.

However, in the preface, Werfel states that readers will justifiably ask "What is true and what is invented?" Werfel answers: "All the memorable happenings that constitute the substance of this book took place in the world of reality. Since their beginning dates back no longer than eighty years [N.B. at the time Werfel wrote the book], there beats upon them the bright light of modern history and their truth has been confirmed by friend and foe and by cool observers through faithful testimonies. My story makes no changes in this body of truth. I exercised my right of creative freedom only where the work, as a work of art, demanded certain chronological condensations or where there was need of striking the spark of life from the hardened substance." He declares: "The Song of Bernadette is a novel but not a fictive work."

It seems to have been inspired in part by Émile Zola's Lourdes (1884), a blistering denunciation of the industry that sprang up in Lourdes around the allegedly miraculous spring. One of Werfel's characters, Hyacinthe de Lafite, a member of the freethinkers' club that hangs around the town cafe, is not only fictional but a thinly disguised portrayal of Zola himself, re-imagined as a failed journalist/author who smugly casts Bernadette's experience in terms of the pagan history of the area: "The shepherd girl out of the antique world who, in the year 1858, sees the guardian nymph of the spring and redeems her from two thousand years of boredom[.]" By the end of the book, Lafite, the lady's "proudest foe", believing himself to be dying of cancer, is "lying on his knees" before the image of Bernadette's lady in the grotto, and crying out, "Bernadette Soubirous, pray for me!"

Werfel goes into great detail about the cures at the Lourdes Spring, and has Dr. Dozous, the town physician, show Hyacinthe through the wards of the hospital, particularly a dormitory of women with a particularly virulent form of Lupus vulgaris in which the face rots and falls off. Werfel provides medical details and claims that some such women have been completely cured after washing in water from the spring, and reports that many more healings take place during the Blessing of the Eucharist ceremony which is held daily at the grotto.

Werfel's description of the veiled lupus sufferers is very similar to that of Zola's description of Elise Rouquet, whose nose and mouth are being eaten away by lupus, on pages 13–14 of Lourdes. Rouquet is also the Zola character who bathes her face in water from the Lourdes spring; one sore on her face improves, but the doctors are unable to decide, throughout the book, whether she actually had lupus or some other illness that responds well to washing or if the partial cure is psychosomatic. No such indecision plagues Dr. Dozous or his fellow physicians; in Chapter 46 of The Song of Bernadette, "The Hell of the Flesh," he implausibly informs the fictional Lafite that one of the lupus patients bathed her face in water from the spring and that she "didn't realize at first that she had a nose and mouth again."

== Copyright ==
The Song of Bernadette has been in the public domain worldwide since the end of 2015: author Franz Werfel's 1945 death plus 70 years.

== Adaptations ==
A 1943 film version, produced by 20th-Century Fox and directed by Henry King, was a major success and won four Academy Awards. One Oscar went to Jennifer Jones, marking her emergence as a Hollywood star.

The Song of Bernadette is an upcoming musical adaption of Werfel's novel by Frank Wildhorn, Rinne Groff, and Robin Lerner. The new musical was scheduled to premiere at the Skylight Music Theatre in Milwaukee, Wisconsin on May 19, 2023, but was then postponed. The first industry reading of the show took place on March 14–15, 2019. In September 2022, a workshop was held in Manhattan.
