= Dominique Peyramale =

French priest

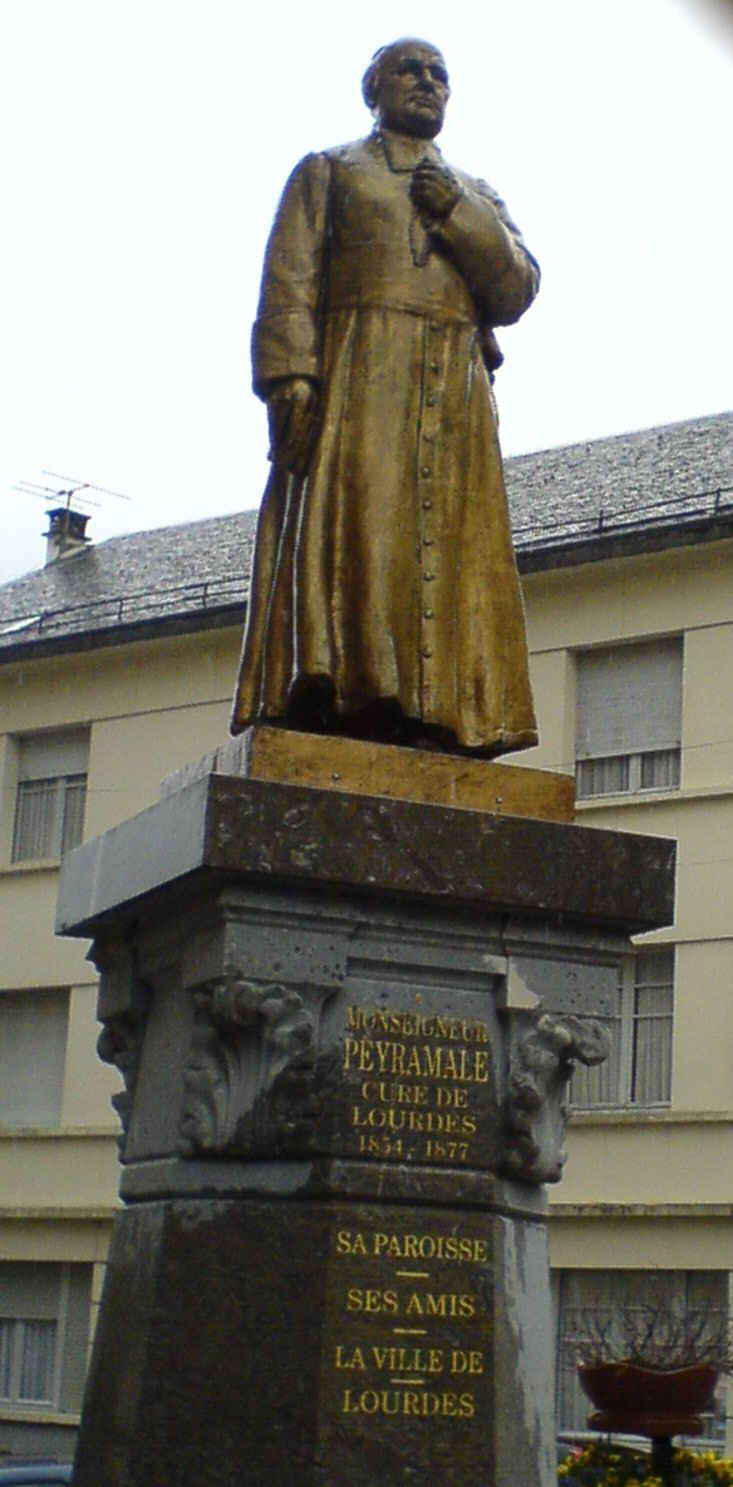
Statue of Dominique Peyramale outside the Parish Church in Lourdes

Abbé Dominique Peyramale (9 January 1811 – 8 September 1877) was a Catholic priest in the town of Lourdes in France during the apparitions of Our Lady of Lourdes to the peasant girl Bernadette Soubirous in 1858. According to Bernadette, her visions occurred at the grotto of Massabielle, just outside Lourdes.

== Parish priest of Lourdes ==
Dominique Peyramale was the parish priest in Lourdes at the time of the apparitions of the Virgin Mary to Bernadette.

Peyramale, under instructions from the bishop of Tarbes, Monsignor Bertrand-Sévère Mascarou Laurence, never visited the grotto during any of the apparitions. He therefore never saw first-hand the effects that these apparitions produced in Bernadette and the onlookers.

Peyramale interviewed Bernadette on a number of occasions. On one occasion, Peyramale asked Bernadette to ask Our Lady to make the rose bush of the grotto bloom. Bernadette would also report to Peyramale that the apparition identified herself as the Immaculate Conception.

Initially convinced he was dealing with a childish prank or hoax, he worked alongside the authorities in Lourdes in encouraging crowds to keep away from the grotto. Peyramale was eventually convinced that Bernadette's experiences were genuine.

Later, after being instructed by his bishop to enable the faithful to visit the Grotto, Peyramale assisted in organising the construction of a chapel on the site of the apparitions and assisting early pilgrimages.

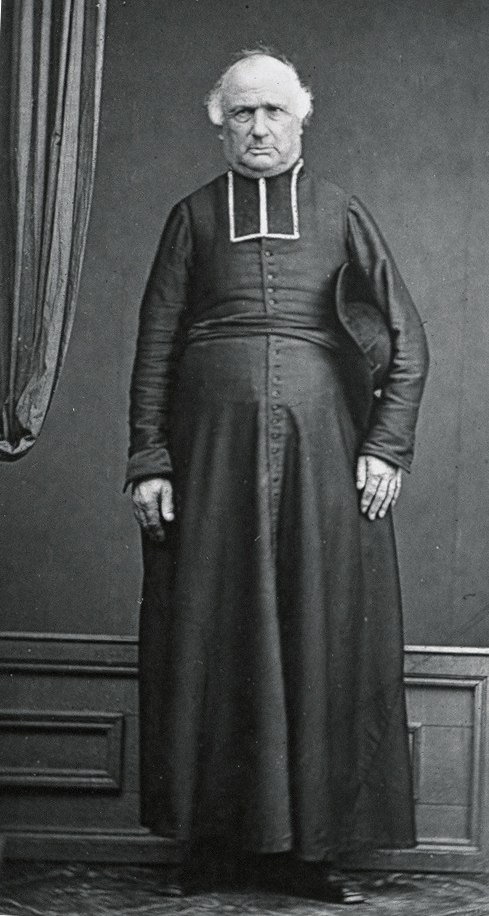
Dominique Peyramale (1811-1877). Parish priest in Lourdes at the time of the apparitions

== Construction of a new parish church ==
One of the projects which Peyramale embarked on was the initial expansion, and later replacement, of the original medieval parish church in Lourdes. Before the apparitions, Lourdes was an unimportant parish of around 4300 people, and Peyramale was unimpressed by his appointment there. The expansion of the church was a means of making his mark on the parish.

== Later life and death ==
Peyramale died in 1877, two years before Bernadette's death. Despite his initial scepticism, he came to believe in the apparitions, and remained in correspondence with Bernadette after she joined the convent of Nevers. Peyramale is buried in the crypt of the parish church of the Sacred Heart in Lourdes. He is remembered with a statue outside the parish church of Lourdes, which he dedicated much time to building, adjacent to the site of the original parish church which burnt down in 1904.

== In popular culture ==
- A street in the town of Lourdes was named after him.
- In the 1943 film The Song of Bernadette, based on Franz Werfel's 1941 novel of the same name, Abbé Peyramale is portrayed by actor Charles Bickford.

== See also ==
- Lourdes apparitions
