= Lourdes apparitions =

1858 reported supernatural activity in Lourdes, France

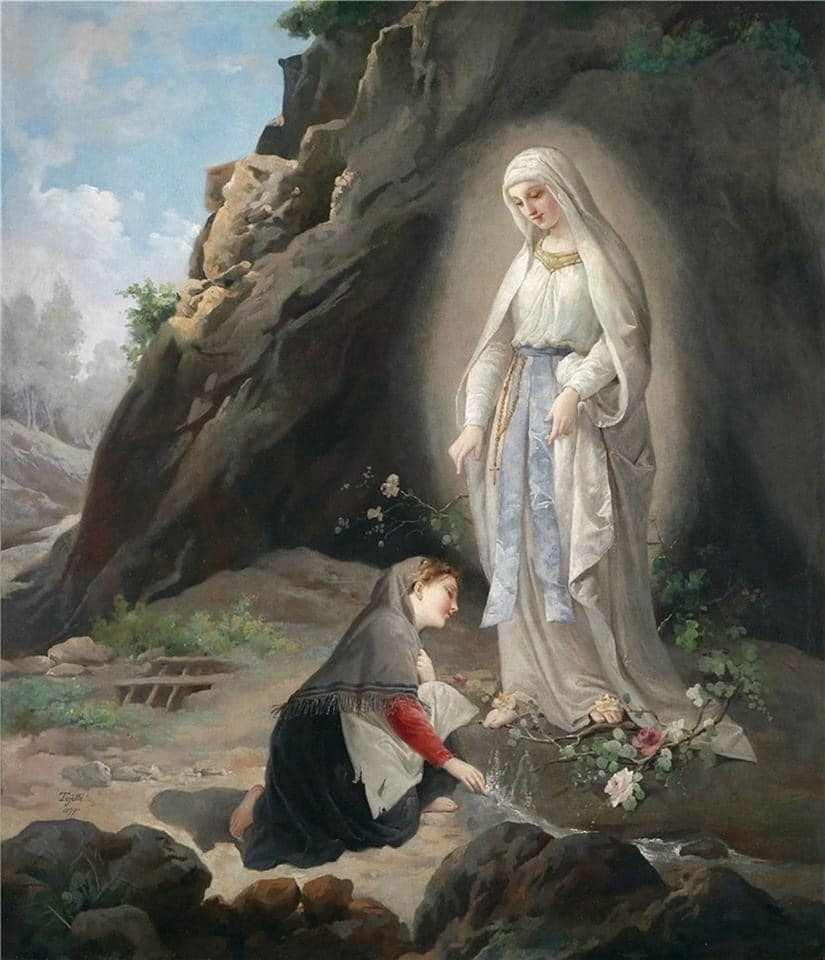
Contemporary depiction of the 9th apparition at Lourdes on 25 February 1858. Painting by Virgilio Tojett in 1877 after Bernadette Soubirous' description.

The Lourdes apparitions are several Marian apparitions reported in 1858 by Bernadette Soubirous, the 14-year-old daughter of a miller, in the town of Lourdes in Southern France.

From 11 February to 16 July 1858, she reported 18 apparitions of "a Lady". Soubirous described the lady as wearing a white veil and a blue girdle; she had a golden rose on each foot and held a rosary of pearls. After initial skepticism from the local clergy, these claims were eventually declared to be worthy of belief by the Catholic Church after a canonical investigation. The apparition is known as Our Lady of Lourdes.

According to Soubirous, her visions occurred at the grotto of Massabielle, just outside Lourdes. On 16 July 1858, Soubirous visited the grotto for the last time and said: "I have never seen her so beautiful before." On 18 January 1862, the local bishop declared: "The Virgin Mary did appear indeed to Bernadette Soubirous." Soubirous was canonized a saint in 1933 by Pope Pius XI. In 1958, Pope Pius XII issued the encyclical Le pèlerinage de Lourdes ("The pilgrimage to Lourdes") on the 100th anniversary of the apparitions. Pope John Paul II visited Lourdes three times; Pope Benedict XVI visited Lourdes on 15 September 2008 to commemorate the 150th anniversary of the apparitions. Pope Leo XIV visited Lourdes on 26 and 27 September 2026.

== February 1858 ==
=== 11 February ===
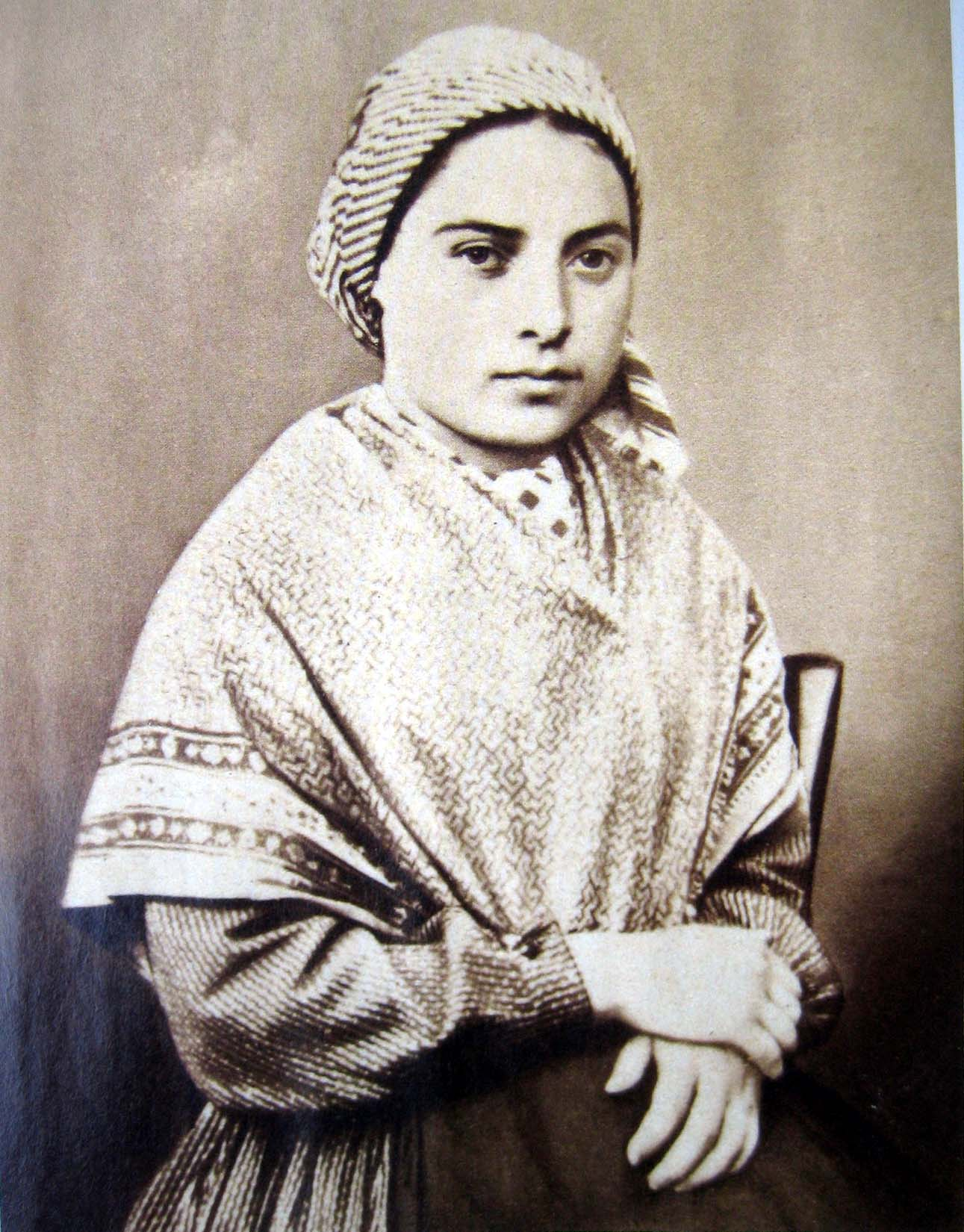
Bernadette Soubirous

On Thursday, 11 February 1858, 14-year-old Bernadette Soubirous was out gathering firewood with her sister Toinette and a friend at the grotto of Massabielle outside Lourdes. There, she reportedly had the first of 18 visions of what she termed "a small young lady", not in French but in the regional Occitan: uo petito damizelo, standing in a niche in the rock.

On realising that she alone, and not her companions, had seen the apparition, Soubirous asked her sister not to tell anyone what had happened. Toinette, however, was unable to keep silent, and told their mother, Louise Soubirous. Because their mother had suspected the children were lying, Soubirous was forbidden to return to the grotto again. A few days passed and Soubirous asked for permission to go again with her siblings and the permission was granted.

=== 14 February ===
On the following Sunday, Bernadette's mother reluctantly gave her permission to go to the grotto. She and two friends arrived and began to pray the rosary. Bernadette again saw the apparition. Once seeing it, she threw Holy water on it. She told the vision that if she came from God she was to stay, but if not, she was to go. The lady simply bowed her head and smiled. Then Soubirous continued saying the rosary. When she had finished, the apparition disappeared and the girls returned for Vespers.

Troubled by the notion that the apparition might represent an evil spirit, Soubirous used the holy water as a test. A further and positive reassuring sign was the apparition's beautiful bare feet; evil apparitions (even when taking human form) were believed to have cloven hooves or animal paws.

=== 18 February ===
The Apparition did not speak until the third appearance, and therefore its identity was a matter of considerable speculation. Pious villagers Jeanne-Marie Milhet and Antoinette Peyret, on hearing Soubirous' description of the apparition, thought it was the returning spirit of one of their friends, who had died a few months before. Although not part of Catholic doctrine, the concept of the revenant was deeply rooted in Pyrenean superstition. According to tradition, revenants rarely spoke, but communicated their messages in writing, and so Milhet and Peyret furnished Soubirous with paper, a pen, and an inkpot to take with her, in case the apparition should make use of them.

On her third visit, she said that the "beautiful lady" asked her to return to the grotto every day for 15 days. At first her mother had forbidden her to go, but Soubirous persuaded her mother to allow her. Soubirous said that the lady told her that she did not promise to make her happy in this world, but in the next.

Although she spoke in Occitan, the regional language that Bernadette (whose French was poor) used, the apparition used a remarkably formal form of the language in her request: "Would you do me the kindness of coming here for fifteen days?" (Occitan: Boulet aoue ra gracia de bié aci penden quinze dias?; French: Voulez-vous me faire la grâce de venir ici pendant quinze jours?). The significance of this politeness was not lost on the observers. It would be very unusual for anyone to adopt this formal form of address when speaking to a peasant girl such as Bernadette.

=== 19 February ===
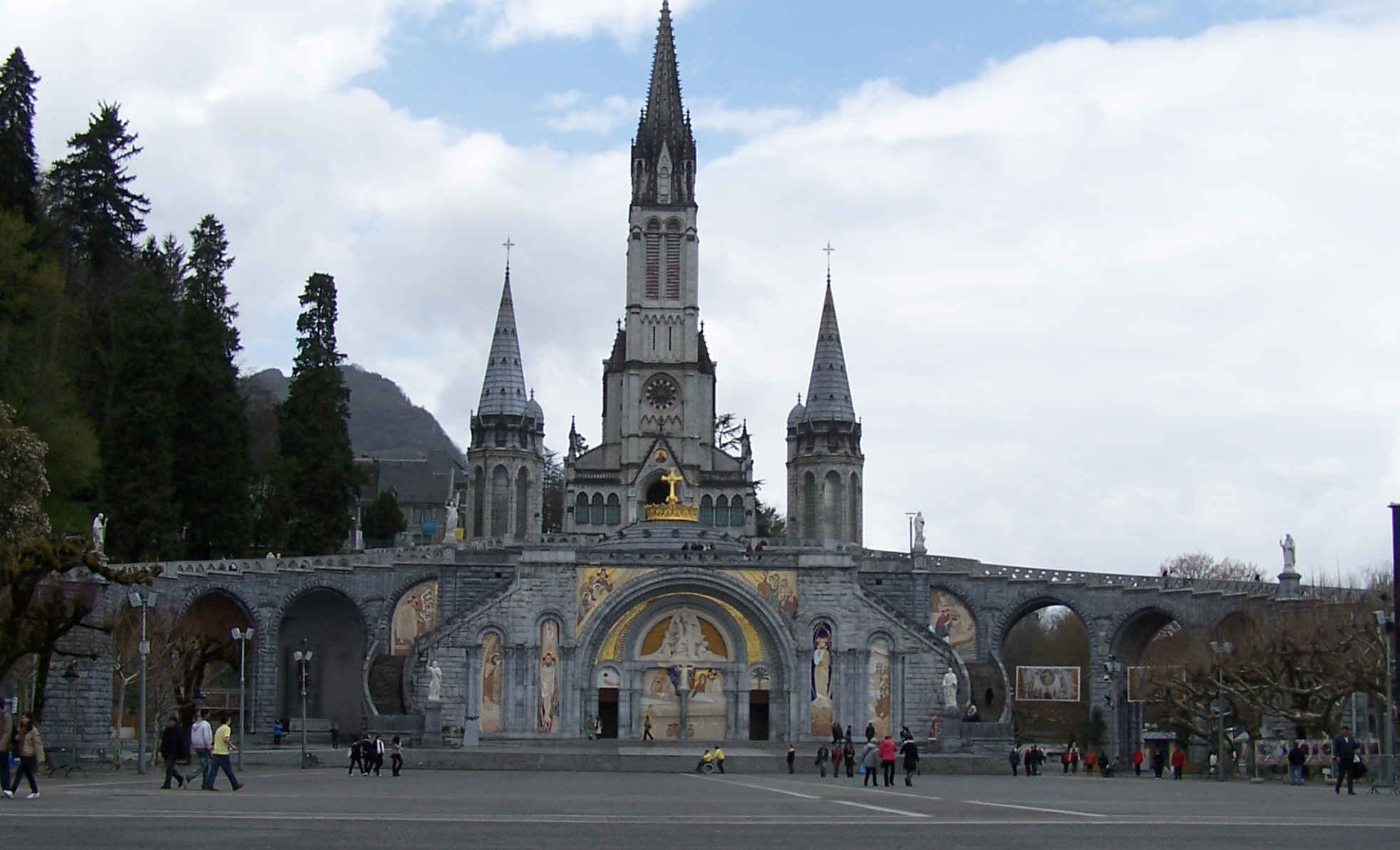
The Sanctuary of Our Lady of Lourdes

Armed with a lighted candle for protection, Soubirous came to the grotto. This originated the custom of carrying lighted candles to the grotto. Eight people were present including Soubirous's mother and two of her aunts, one of whom, Aunt Bernarde, was her godmother and the most influential member of her mother's family.

Soubirous's story caused a sensation with the townspeople, who were divided in their opinions on whether or not Soubirous was telling the truth. Soon, a large number of people followed her on her daily journey, some out of curiosity and others who firmly believed that they were witnessing a miracle.

=== 20 February ===
Thirty people were present. Soubirous reported later that the lady had taught her a prayer, which she said every day of her life, but never wrote down or repeated to anyone. By this time, the news was spreading to other towns, and many people assumed that Soubirous's lady was the Virgin Mary.

=== 21 February ===
Over 100 people were present, and the apparition said to her: "You will pray to God for sinners." Afterwards Soubirous was interrogated by Dominique Jacomet, the police commissioner. Her father, François Soubirous, eventually assured the commissioner that the affair would cease.

=== 23 February ===
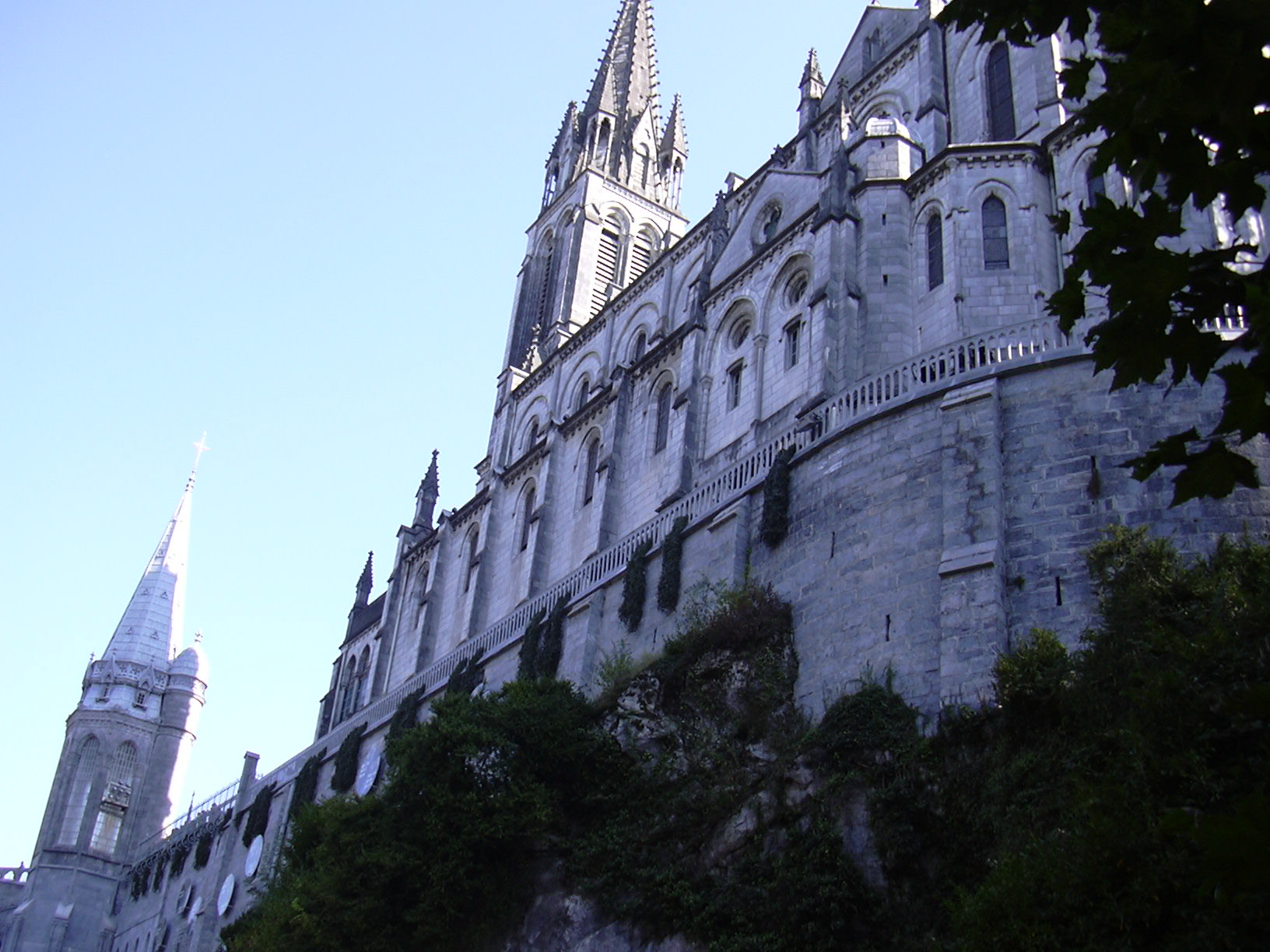
Lourdes Basilica of the Apparitions

About 150 people were present. Jean-Baptiste Estrade (a tax inspector), Duffo (a court official), and the officers from the garrison were present. Soubirous said later that the lady had told her a secret, which was only for her alone; this secret was never revealed to anyone.

=== 24 February ===
About 250 people were present. The message of the lady was: "Penance! Penance! Penance! Pray to God for sinners! Kiss the ground as an act of penance for sinners!"

=== 25 February ===
[The Lady] told her that she should go and drink at the fountain and wash herself. Seeing no fountain I went to drink at the Gave. She said it was not there; she pointed with her finger that she was to go in under the rock. She went, and she found a puddle of water which was more like mud, and the quantity was so small that she could hardly gather a little in the hollow of her hand. Nevertheless she obeyed, and started scratching the ground; after doing that she was able to take some. The water was so dirty that three times she threw it away. The fourth time she was able to drink it. She made her eat grass growing in the same place where she had drunk; once only; she didn't know why. Then the Vision disappeared and she went home.

Soubirous was interrogated again. The spring reportedly began to flow a day later.

=== 27 February ===
About 800 people were present.

=== 28 February ===
Over 1,000 people were present. Soubirous was questioned by Judge Ribes afterwards.

== March 1858 ==
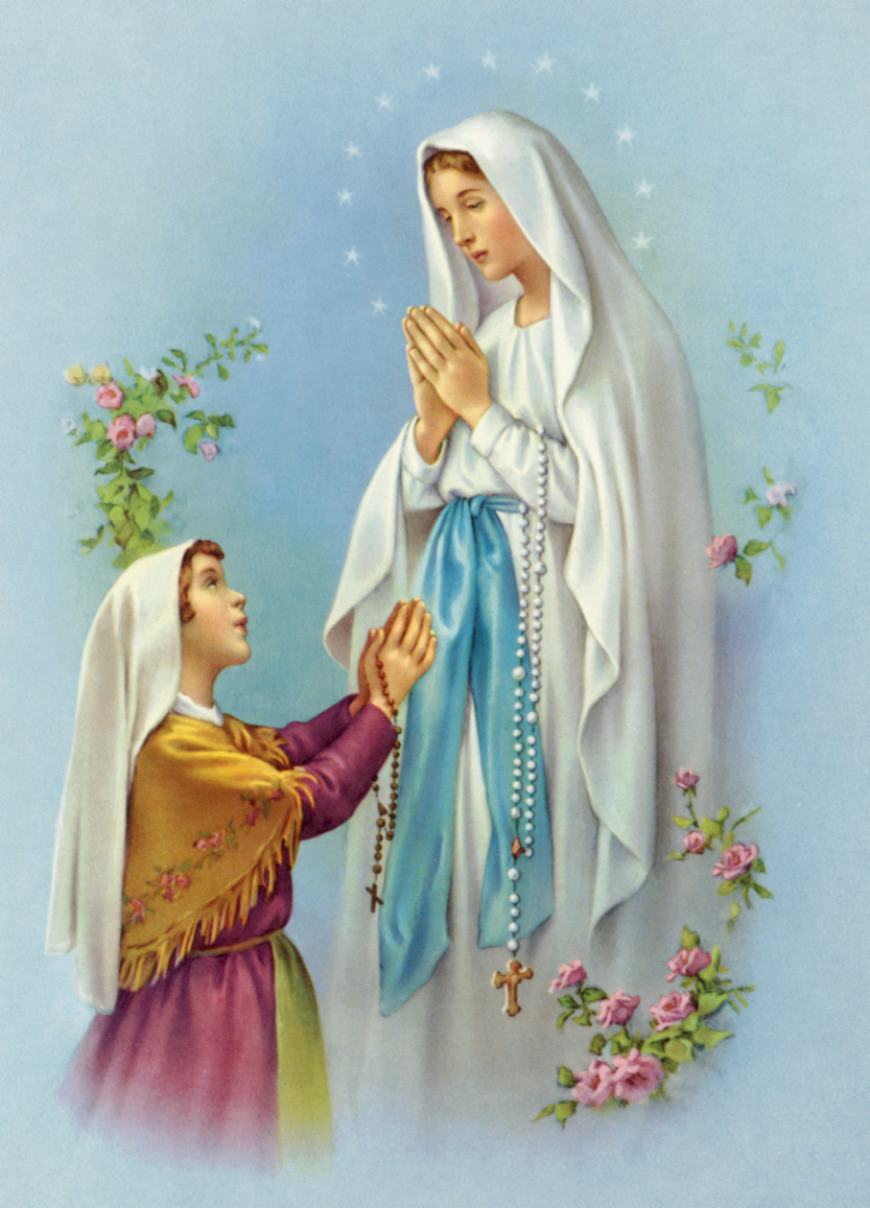
Old holy card with the apparition of the Virgin Mary in Lourdes

=== 1 March ===
There were almost 1,500 people present. Local housewife Catherine Latapie, nine months pregnant, who had a paralysis of the ulnar nerve in one arm following an accident, reported regaining full movement after bathing her arm in the spring. Simultaneously, she went into labor and had to leave almost immediately to give birth. She gave an account of these events to local physician Dr. Pierre Romaine Dozous, who began to collect information on healings at the spring.

=== 2 March ===
The lady commanded Soubirous: "Go, tell the priests to come here in procession and to build a chapel here." Accompanied by her two aunts, Soubirous went to ask Dominique Peyramale, the local parish priest; he forbade her to go to the grotto, and dismissed her. Peyramale had ordered his chaplains to have nothing to do with the grotto, for it was the general practice of the clergy to discourage religious visionaries. Soubirous was determined and returned with one of the priest's friends to ask again. After Soubirous was questioned before the parish clergy and dismissed, the priests could not agree on what course to take.

=== 3 March ===
Previously, Peyramale had told Soubirous that the requests for the procession and chapel could not be fulfilled unless and until the lady's name was known. On this occasion, Soubirous asked for the lady's name; according to Soubirous, the lady only smiled and laughed.

=== 4 March ===
Over 9,000 people were present.

The third time I went to see M. le Curé, to tell him that a Lady had ordered me to go and say to the priests that they were to have a chapel built there, he looked at me for a moment, and then he said to me in a rather gruff tone, 'Who is this lady?' I answered that I did not know. Then he commissioned me to ask her name and to come and tell him. The next day when I arrived at the grotto I recited my rosary and then asked her, from M. le Curé what her name was, but all she did was to smile. When I got back I went to M. le Curé to tell him that I discharged his commission, and her only response was her smile; then he said she was laughing at me and that I would do well not to go to her again. But, I could not help going.

I came back for a fortnight. The vision appeared every day, except one Monday [22 February] and one Friday [26 February]. She repeated to me several times that I was to tell the priests they were to build a Chapel there, and I was to go to the fountain to wash, and that I was to pray for sinners. During this fortnight, she told me three secrets which she forbade me to tell anyone. I have been faithful until now.

=== 25 March ===
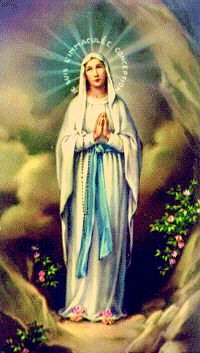
Our Lady of Lourdes: Mary appearing at Lourdes with rosary beads. The words on her halo are: French: Je suis l'Immaculée conception (I am the Immaculate Conception).

I went every day for a fortnight, and each day I asked her who she was—and this petition always made her smile. After the fortnight I asked her three times consecutively. She always smiled. At last I tried for the fourth time. She stopped smiling. With her arms down, she raised her eyes to heaven and then, folding her hands over her breast she said, "I am the Immaculate Conception." Then I went back to M. le Curé to tell him that she had said she was the Immaculate Conception, and he asked was I absolutely certain. I said yes, and so as not to forget the words, I had repeated them all the way home.

Peyramale decided to go to Tarbes to visit the bishop. The bishop determined that Peyramale should remain away from the grotto.

== April 1858 ==
=== 7 April ===
Dr. Pierre Romaine Dozous, the town physician, originally watched the apparitions from a skeptical viewpoint. He believed Soubirous, whom he knew well, was in her right mind aside from the apparitions.

He reported:

Bernadette seemed to be even more absorbed than usual in the Appearance upon which her gaze was riveted. I witnessed, as did also every one else there present, the fact which I am about to narrate. She was on her knees saying with fervent devotion the prayers of her Rosary which she held in her left hand while in her right was a large blessed candle, alight. The child was just beginning to make the usual ascent on her knees when suddenly she stopped and, her right hand joining her left, the flame of the big candle passed between the fingers of the latter. Though fanned by a fairly strong breeze, the flame produced no effect upon the skin which it was touching. Astonished at this strange fact, I forbade anyone there to interfere, and taking my watch in my hand, I studied the phenomenon attentively for a quarter of an hour. At the end of this time Bernadette, still in her ecstasy, advanced to the upper part of the Grotto, separating her hands. The flame thus ceased to touch her left hand. Bernadette finished her prayer and the splendour of the transfiguration left her face. She rose and was about to quit the Grotto when I asked her to show me her left hand. I examined it most carefully, but could not find the least trace of burning anywhere upon it. I then asked the person who was holding the candle to light it again and give it to me. I put it several times in succession under Bernadette's left hand but she drew it away quickly, saying 'You are burning me!'. I record this fact just as I have seen it without attempting to explain it. Many persons who were present at the time can confirm what I have said.

On 8 June 1858, the mayor of Lourdes barricaded the grotto and stationed guards to prevent public access. Visitors were fined for kneeling near the grotto or talking about the grotto.

== July 1858 ==
=== 16 July ===
This was the final appearance. Because the grotto was barricaded by the local government, Soubirous knelt outside the fence by the riverbank. "I thought I was at the Grotto, at the same distance as I was the other times. All I saw was Our Lady [...] She was more beautiful than ever."

== Later developments ==
The grotto reopened to the public in October 1858 by order of Emperor Louis Napoleon III. Soubirous received no further apparitions after the 18th appearance (on 16 July 1858), and she did not feel any desire to visit the grotto afterwards. The people, however, kept on visiting. In 1866, Soubirous left Lourdes to join a religious congregation.

Several churches were eventually built at Lourdes, including the Sanctuary of Our Lady of Lourdes and the Basilica of St. Pius X.

Soubirous was canonized by the Catholic Church in 1933. Her feast day is celebrated on 16 April. in France and Canada, it is celebrated on 18 February. The Feast of the Apparition of Our Blessed Lady at Lourdes is celebrated on 11 February.

== See also ==
- Lourdes water
- Marian apparition
- Our Lady of Lourdes
- Sanctuary of Our Lady of Lourdes
- The Song of Bernadette, 1941 novel
- The Song of Bernadette, 1943 film
- "The Village of Saint Bernadette", 1959 song

== Notes ==
=== Works cited ===
- Harris, Ruth (1999). Lourdes: Body and Spirit in the Secular Age. Penguin Books. ISBN 0-71-399186-0.
- Lasserre, Henri (1906). Our Lady of Lourdes (11th ed.). New York: P. J. Kenedy & Sons.
- Laurentin, L. (1988). "Lourdes". Marienlexikon. Regensburg: Eos Verlag.
