= Sanctuary of Our Lady of Lourdes =

Marian shrine in Hautes-Pyrénées, France

Coordinates: 43°05′51″N 0°03′30″W

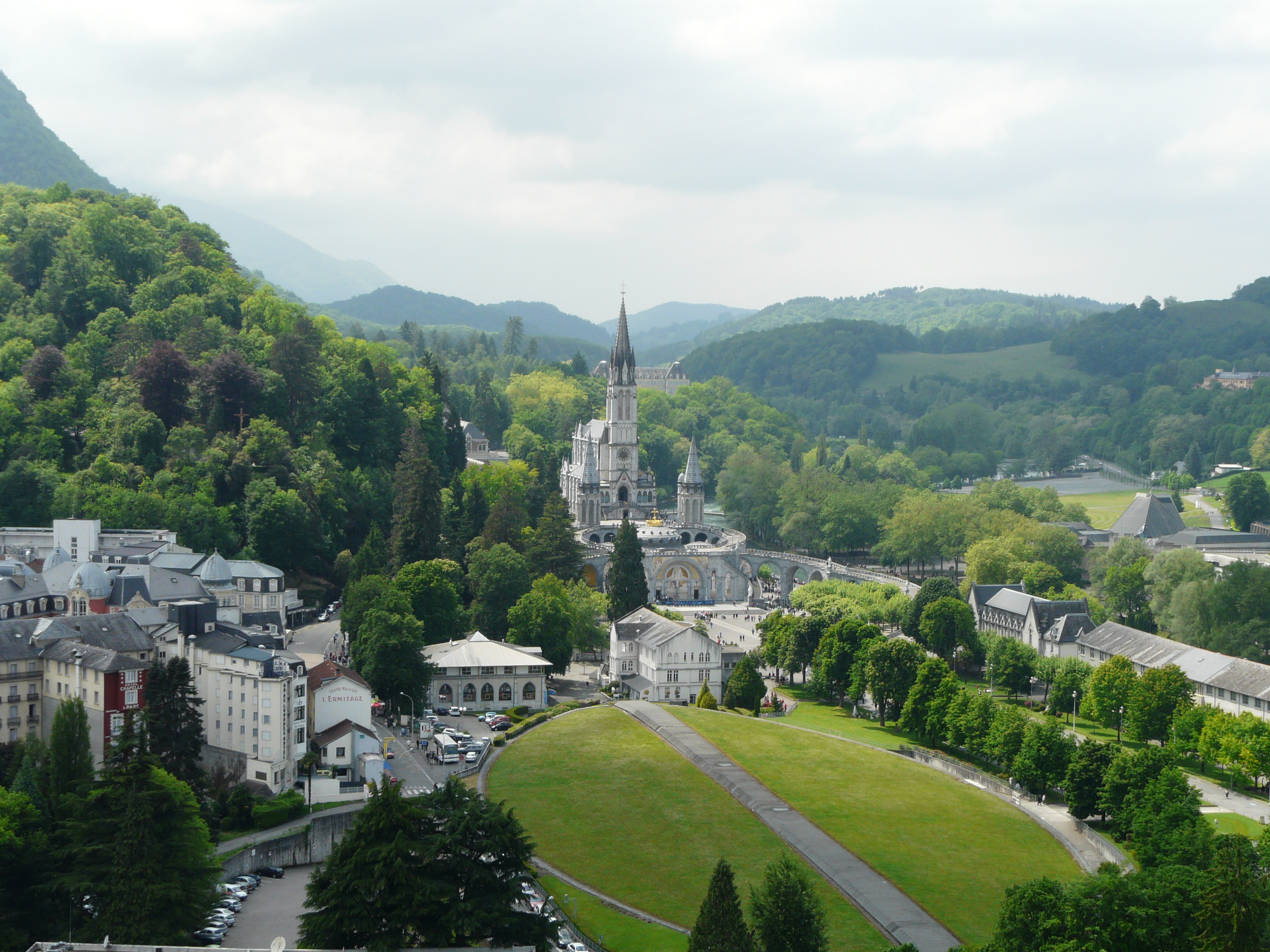
View of the Sanctuary of Our Lady of Lourdes from the town castle

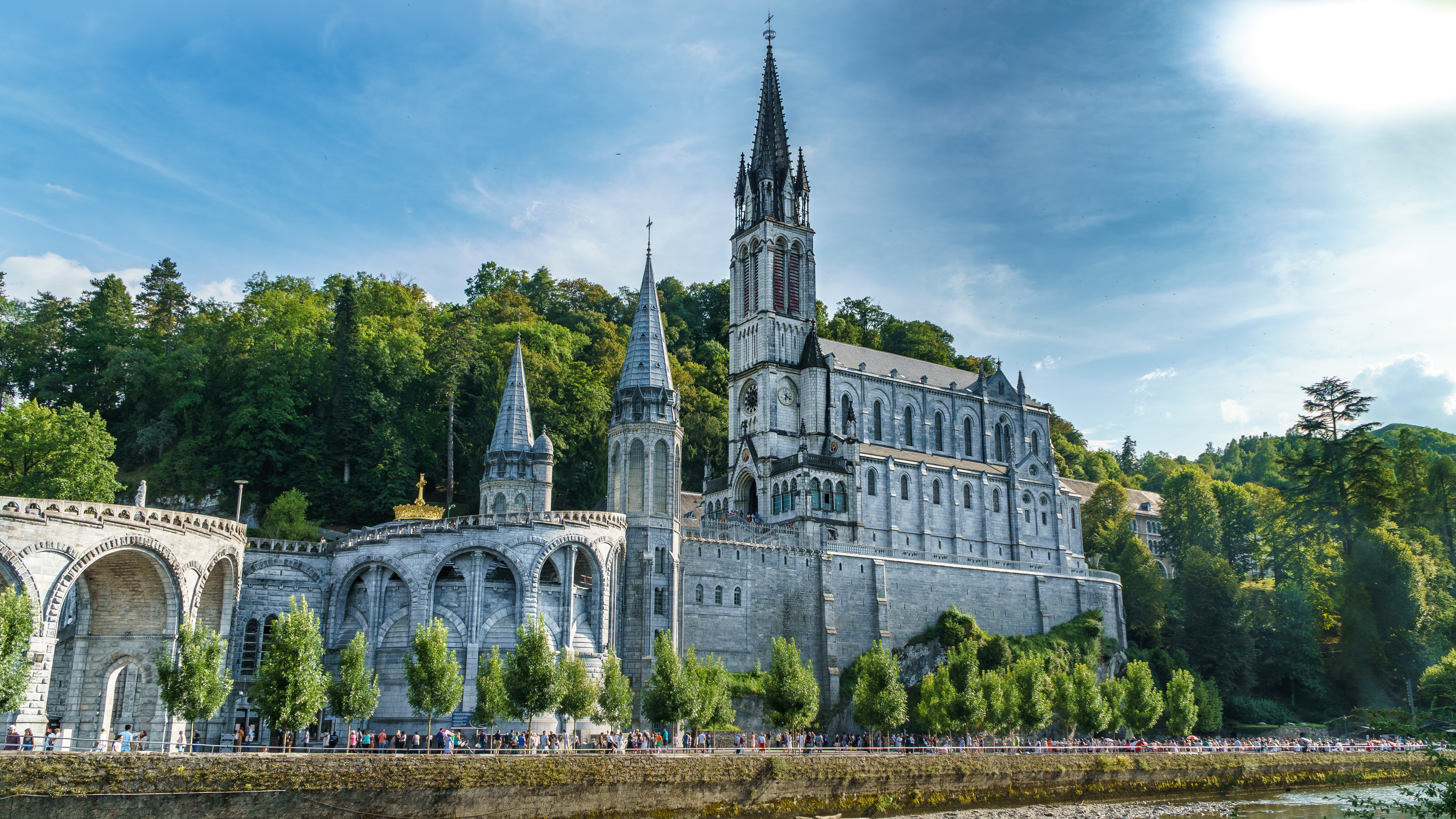
The Basilica of the Immaculate Conception and Massabielle grotto

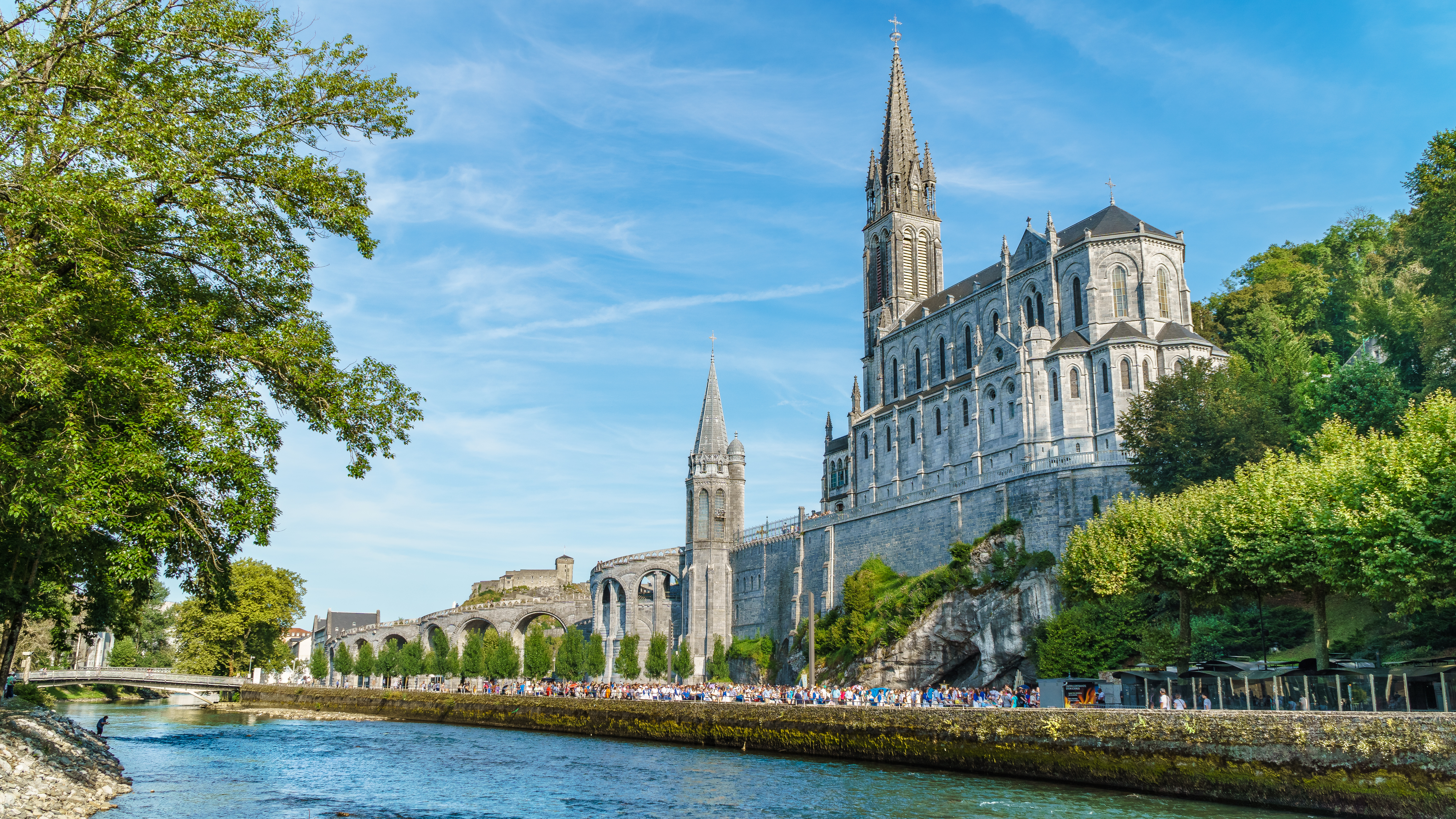
The Sanctuary of Our Lady of Lourdes from the Gave de Pau bank

The Sanctuary of Our Lady of Lourdes (French: Sanctuaire de Notre-Dame de Lourdes; Occitan: Santuari de Nòstra Senhora de Lorda) is a Catholic Marian shrine and pilgrimage site dedicated to Our Lady of Lourdes in the town of Lourdes, Hautes-Pyrénées, France. The sanctuary includes several religious buildings and monuments around the grotto of Massabielle, the place where the events of the Lourdes apparitions occurred in 1858, among them are three basilicas, the Basilica of Our Lady of the Immaculate Conception, the Rosary Basilica and the Basilica of St. Pius X, respectively known as the upper, lower and underground basilica.

The sanctuary is a destination for sick and disabled pilgrims as the Lourdes water, which has flowed from the grotto since the apparitions, is reputed for miraculous healings. The area is owned and administered by the Roman Catholic Diocese of Tarbes-et-Lourdes, and has several functions, including devotional activities, offices, and accommodation for sick and disabled pilgrims and their helpers. In addition to the grotto and the three basilicas, the sanctuary includes fountains providing Lourdes water, baths for immersion in the water, an esplanade for processions, a calvary, the offices of the Lourdes Medical Bureau, and several places of worship in a 52-hectare (130-acre) area.

The sanctuary of Lourdes is one of the most-visited Catholic shrines in the world, with around four million tourists coming every year. The grotto of Massabielle, which is the most famous site in the sanctuary, has hundreds of replicas around the world, known as "Lourdes grottos".

== History ==
The sanctuary of Our Lady of Lourdes began with the Marian apparitions to Bernadette Soubirous in 1858 in the town of Lourdes. On 11 February 1858, a 14-year-old peasant girl, called Bernadette Soubirous, said she saw a "lady" while playing near the grotto of Massabielle (from masse vieille: "old mass") with her sister and a friend, on the left bank of the Gave de Pau river. The "lady" was standing on a rose bush in a niche above the main cavity of the Massabielle grotto.

At the time of the apparitions, the grotto lay well outside town, on common ground which was used by the villagers variously for pasturing animals, collecting firewood, and as a garbage dump, and it had a reputation for being an unpleasant place.

Bernadette told her sister not to tell their parents about the apparition, but she told them anyway and their parents forbid them to go to the grotto again. Bernadette ignored their orders and kept going to the grotto. From 11 February to 16 July 1858, Bernadette saw the same vision 18 times. The "lady" eventually introduced herself to Bernadette as the Immaculate Conception, which had been proclaimed as a dogma for the Virgin Mary by Pope Pius IX in 1854. This convinced local priest Dominique Peyramale that Bernadette saw an authentic apparition of the Virgin Mary.

During the apparitions, Bernadette was given instructions by the "lady", which were to prove central in the development of the sanctuary and its ceremonies. Bernadette was told to go and drink water from a spring which was to appear inside the grotto and wash herself with it. She was also told to go and tell the priests to build a chapel at the grotto site where people were to come in procession.

During the months after the apparitions, public interest in the apparitions grew, and curious visitors began to be replaced by pilgrims from increasingly far away, drawn by compelling stories of apparitions and miracles.

Local priest Dominique Peyramale and local bishop Bertrand-Sévère Laurence bought the grotto and the land around it from the town of Lourdes in 1861, three years after the apparitions. Immediately they set about modifying the area to make it more accessible to pilgrims, and started work to build the first of the churches, which is now known as the "Crypt".

In 1864, the French sculptor Joseph-Hugues Fabisch was commissioned to create a statue of Our Lady of Lourdes based on Bernadette's descriptions. Although it has become an iconic symbol of Our Lady of Lourdes, it depicts a figure which is not only older and taller than Bernadette's description, but also more in keeping with orthodox and traditional representations of the Virgin Mary. The statue rests in the niche where the Virgin appeared to Bernadette. The original wild rose bush was destroyed shortly after the apparitions by pilgrims seeking relics, but a newer one has been planted nearby.

Due to French political upheaval resulting in an enforced separation of Church and State, the property and grounds of the sanctuary were confiscated from the Church and returned to the ownership of the town in 1910. The then bishop, François-Xavier Schoepfer, contested this confiscation and was permitted to rent the area of the sanctuary from the town until the outbreak of World War I in 1914.

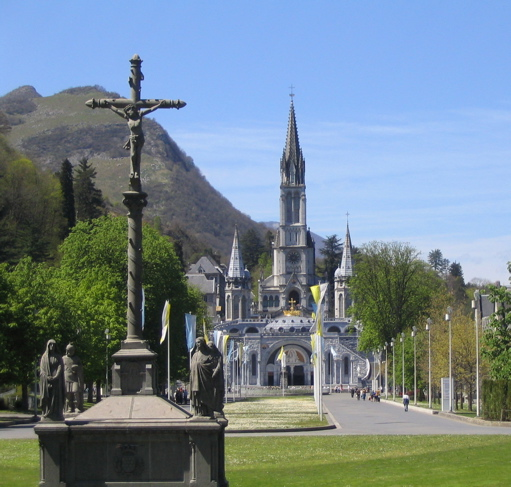
The Sanctuary of Our Lady of Lourdes

Later, a visit to Lourdes by Marshal Pétain in 1941 provided official recognition of the sanctuary. Church officials successfully petitioned Pétain to allow the Church to reclaim ownership of the sanctuary.

== Administration ==
The Bishop of Tarbes and Lourdes is responsible for the spiritual governance of the sanctuary. He appoints a local representative, who is called the rector. The sanctuary is run independently of the parish of Lourdes, which is responsible for the spiritual needs of the Lourdais themselves.

Thirty full-time chaplains are employed in the sanctuary, from dioceses and religious communities worldwide. As of 2010 there were 292 full-time lay employees and a further 120 seasonal employees working in 63 different divisions, with an annual running budget of €18 million, 90% from donations.

The sanctuary is open all year round. In winter there are substantially fewer visitors, a reduced timetable of services and devotional activity, and no processions. The winter season runs from 1 November (the feast of All Saints) until Easter. On 11 February, the Feast of Our Lady of Lourdes, a full programme of activities usually takes place.

The sanctuary is fully active between Easter and All Saints' Day each year, and has a programme of devotional activities including Mass, processions, adoration of the Blessed Sacrament, and the sacrament of reconciliation. Many activities are carried out in several languages; in some services the liturgy is repeated in different languages.

The grounds are open daily from 5 am until midnight; outside these times the grotto is accessible via the Lacets Gate behind the Upper Basilica.

An estimated 200 million people have visited the shrine since 1860, including those who attend as members of pilgrimages organised on a national or diocesan basis. The first English diocesan pilgrimages were from Liverpool, Salford and Leeds in the 1920s. The first pilgrimage to arrive in Lourdes by plane took place in 1948.

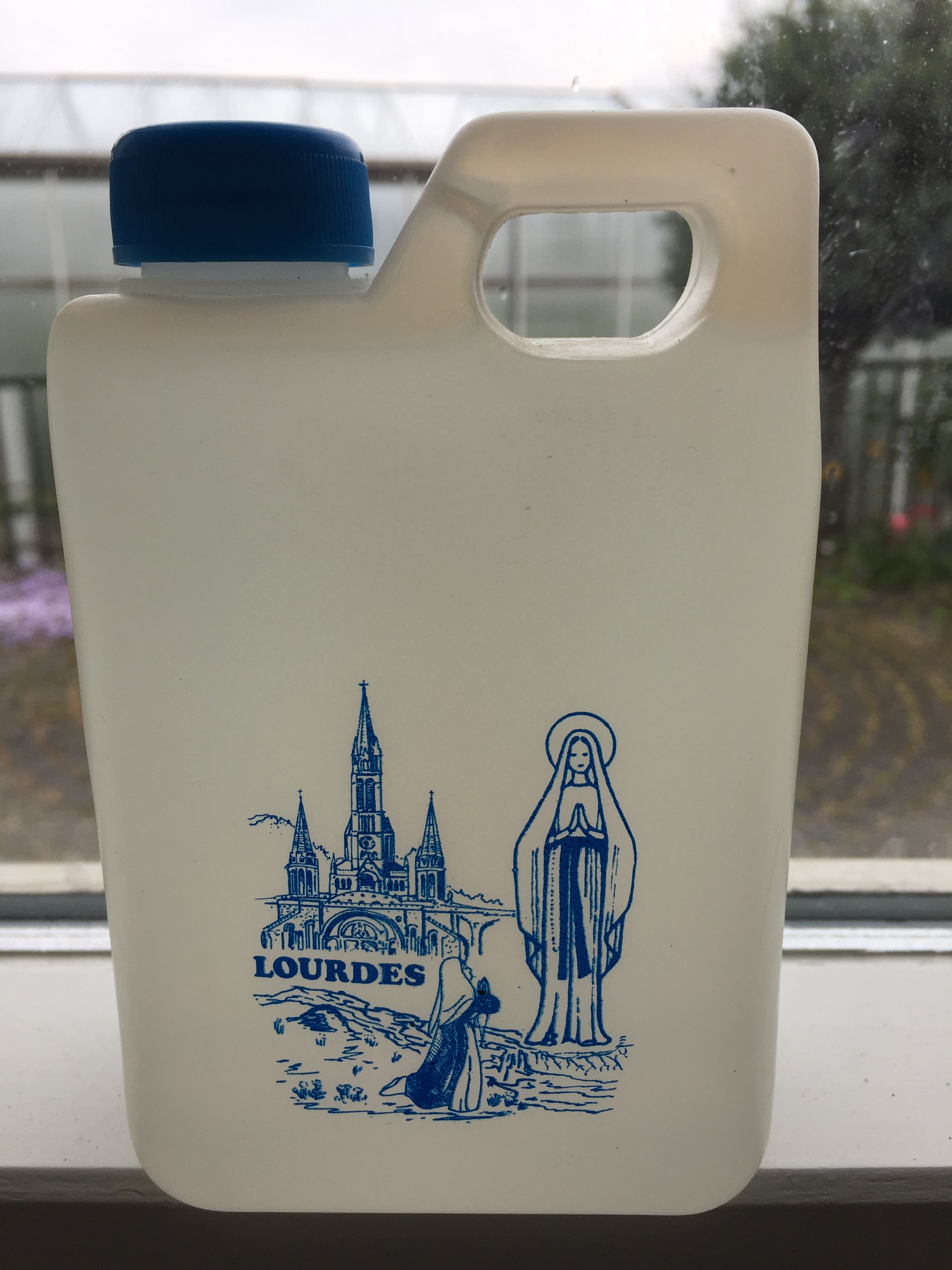
A container filled with Lourdes water

The Roman Catholic Church has officially recognized 72 miraculous healings, the latest of which was the cure of Antonietta Raco, recognised on 16 April 2025.

== Lourdes water ==
Lourdes water flows from a spring at the same spot where it was discovered by Bernadette, in the grotto of Massabielle. The original spring can be seen within the grotto, lit from below and protected by a glass screen. Pilgrims drink Lourdes water due to its reputed healing power. The water is accessed from individual taps located between the grotto and the baths. The water from Lourdes was thoroughly analysed by independent chemists in 1858 and 1859, and does not appear to have a latent power to cure and has no special scientific or medicinal properties, having been described as a placebo. Despite this, the water is itself a strong symbol of devotion for Lourdes pilgrims, and many buy statues and rosary beads containing small vials of it, and take home large plastic containers of it.

== Processions ==
Processions are held in the sanctuary, with the torchlight procession being perhaps the best-known and most visually impressive.

=== Blessed Sacrament procession ===
The Blessed Sacrament procession is held daily at 5:00 pm. The procession begins at the open-air altar on the prairie across the river from the grotto and is led by sick pilgrims followed by a priest, bishop or cardinal carrying a monstrance containing the Blessed Sacrament. Typically the bearer of the Blessed Sacrament is sheltered by a baldachin. The Blessed Sacrament is accompanied by candle bearers and incense burners. These ministers are chosen from the pilgrims. A representative group of doctors from the various pilgrimages follow directly behind the Blessed Sacrament, both during the procession and the Blessing of the sick. Lastly, there are groups of pilgrims, some following their parish or diocesan banner. The procession makes its way across the river, past the Crowned Virgin, along the esplanade and down into the St. Pius X underground basilica where pilgrims with disabilities are provided accommodations (often in the front) to access the altar. During the procession, there are meditations, prayers, hymns and chants, all in several languages. When all the participants are assembled, there is a period of Eucharistic adoration, followed by the Blessing of the Sick.

During extreme weather conditions, the procession takes place inside the basilica.

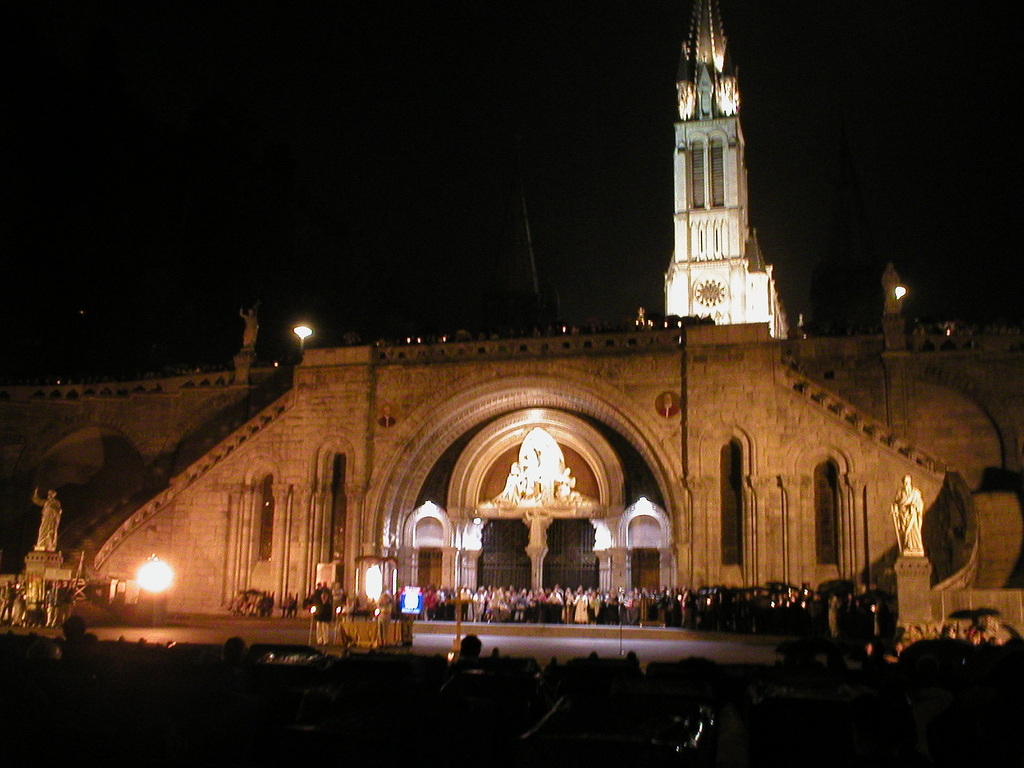
Rosary Basilica at night, looking across Rosary Square during the Torchlight Procession

=== Torchlight procession ===
The torchlight Marian procession takes place daily at 9 pm. It begins near the grotto and continues in the alleys of the esplanade ending in the Rosary square. In extreme weather an indoor ceremony may be held in the Underground Basilica instead. The procession is led by sick and disabled pilgrims followed by volunteers carrying a replica of the Cabuchet statue of the Virgin Mary. Most participants carry a candle.

The focus of this procession is the rosary. All five decades are recited, usually in a variety of languages. The Immaculate Mary, the Lourdes hymn, is also sung, with verses in different languages. Intercessions may be invoked followed by the Laudate Mariam. There is a final blessing in Latin, and then an invitation to exchange the sign of peace with fellow pilgrims.

== Basilicas ==
=== Upper Basilica ===
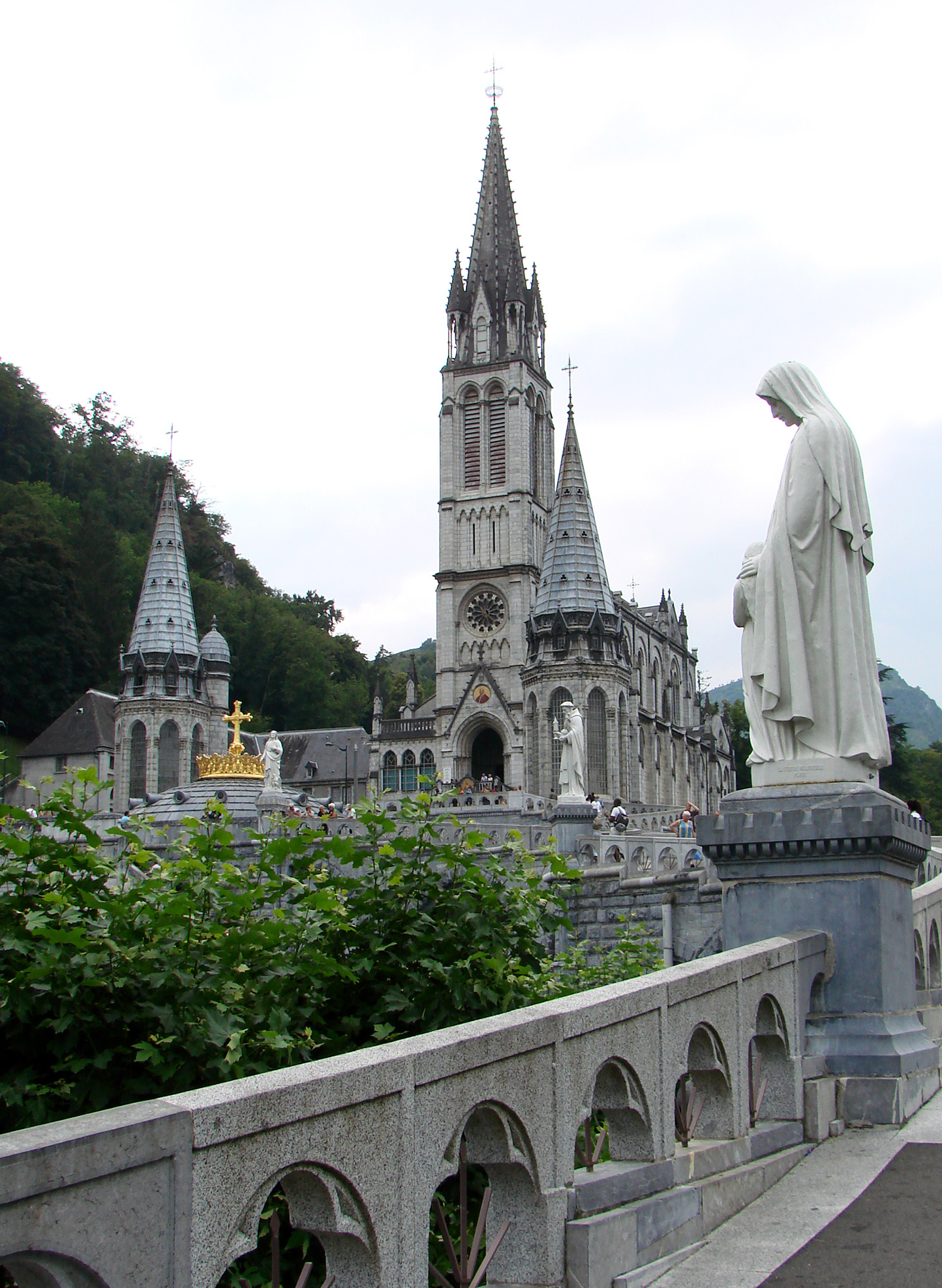
The Basilica of the Immaculate Conception, commonly known as the Upper Basilica, Lourdes

The Basilica of the Immaculate Conception, commonly known as the "Upper Basilica", was consecrated in 1876. It is an impressive, elaborate building in Gothic style, designed by architect Hyppolyte Durand, and on one side seems to emerge directly from the rock of Massabielle (the sanctuary is directly above the grotto). The walls are lined with ex voto plaques, and banners from official National Pilgrimages of the past. It has a series of stained-glass windows depicting various events in the story of Lourdes; the clerestory windows depict Mary as "the Second Eve".

The exterior is dominated by a 70 m (230 ft) spire, and two lesser spires completed later in 1908. Above the entrance is a mosaic depicting Pope Pius IX, who defined the dogma of the Immaculate Conception in 1854.

The basilica has a crypt, which was the first church to be completed in the sanctuary, in 1866. Construction was started by Abbé Peyramale and bishop Laurence. Bernadette's father worked on its construction and was present at its official opening, on Pentecost Sunday 1866. The nave is small and a notable feature as are the enormous pillars which support the weight of the Upper Basilica, which was constructed on top of it.

The crypt is entered along a corridor, whose entrance is dominated by a large bronze statue of St. Peter, holding the Keys of the Kingdom of Heaven. Opposite stands a statue of Pius X. The walls of the corridor and nave are lined with small marble plaques, known as ex voto plaques, donated in thanks for spiritual favours received.

=== Lower Basilica ===
The Rosary Basilica, known as the "Lower Basilica", was completed in 1899, and designed by architect Leopold Hardy. It was consecrated in 1901 and has a capacity of 1,500 worshipers. Its style is influenced by Byzantine architecture. The nave is open and circular, surmounted by a dome. The exterior of the dome is surmounted by a dramatic gilded crown and cross, which were a gift from the people of Ireland in 1924.

The exterior facade of the basilica was modified in 2007 to include a depiction of the luminous mysteries, which are not a part of the traditional fifteen mysteries, but of an extended version of it by Pope John Paul II in 2002.

=== Underground Basilica ===
The Basilica of St. Pius X, known as the "Underground Basilica", is the largest of the sanctuary's churches. It was designed by the architect Pierre Vago and completed in 1958 in anticipation of the enormous crowds expected in Lourdes for the centenary of the apparitions. A modern, concrete building, it is almost entirely underground (part of the building lies beneath the Boulevard Père Rémi Sempé above). When full it can accommodate 25,000 worshippers.

== Grotto area ==
The place where Bernadette Soubirous is said to have seen the Lourdes apparitions is called the "grotto of Massabielle", which is the most famous place in the sanctuary. The Lourdes water flows from a spring located inside the cave. From 2014 to 2018, the surroundings of the grotto were modified to facilitate the passing of pilgrims through the various facilities around the grotto. A new esplanade was built on the banks, taps providing water from the spring were moved away from the grotto while new fountains for pilgrims were created, baths were renovated and a new bridge was built. Chapel of lights were built on the right bank for pilgrims to light candles.

=== Grotto of Massabielle ===
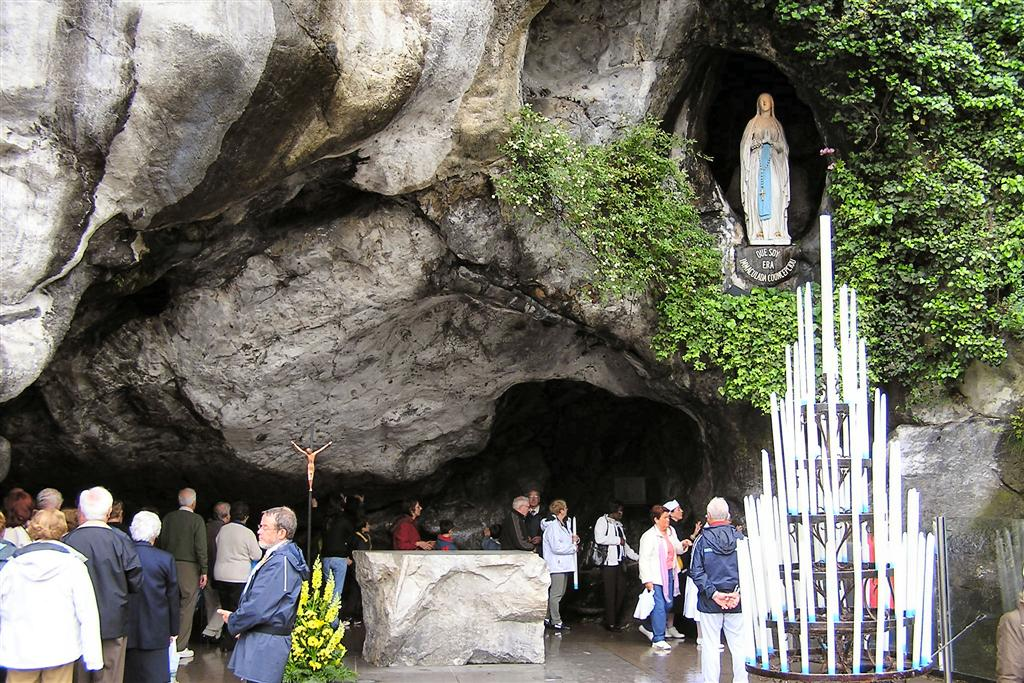
The grotto of Massabielle

In contrast to the grandness of Rosary Square and the three basilicas, the grotto at Massabielle where St Bernadette's visions took place is very simple and stark. The recess of the grotto itself is undecorated, although a plain stone altar and lectern have been placed there so that Mass can be celebrated. Above the main recess is the niche where the "lady" seen by Bernadette Soubirous was standing during the apparitions and Fabisch's statue of Our Lady of Lourdes now stands. A large candelabra with 96 candles next to the altar is kept burning throughout the year. During the pilgrimage season, two pilgrimage Masses are usually celebrated each morning at the grotto.

The spring that Bernadette discovered can be seen at the rear of the grotto, shielded by a glass cover. When Mass is not being celebrated, pilgrims can process through the grotto where it is traditional to touch the rocks directly under the statue; so many people have done this that the stones have become polished. Also at the rear of the grotto is a metal box into which written prayers or petitions may be deposited; they are collected daily and burnt.

Rows of benches allow visitors to sit and pray or contemplate. Pilgrims are asked to remain silent while in the vicinity to create an atmosphere of devotion. One of the spots where Bernadette prayed to the Virgin is marked by a special paving slab.

Some of the rock walls around the grotto bear clear signs of deliberate alteration, presumably to improve access for pilgrims. It is therefore no longer clear what the original configuration of the grotto was.

At least one contemporary account describes a series of chambers behind the statue's niche, which can only be reached by climbing "like a lizard" through clefts in the rocks.

=== Water taps and fountains ===
Lourdes water used to be available for pilgrims at water taps located near the grotto along the Massabielle rock. However, people in charge of the sanctuary thought it would be better to have two separate places for Lourdes water distribution, with one place available for drinking water and filling bottles and containers with water and another place intended for pilgrims to take water as a religious gesture, in the same way Bernadette Soubirous did during the apparitions when she was told by the "lady" to drink water from the spring and wash herself with it. This is why new fountains were created for the "water gesture" on the western side of the grotto along the Massabielle rock, shaped to made it difficult to fill bottles and containers, with a low water flow. New water taps were built on the bank, intended to filling bottles and containers with Lourdes water, away from the grotto.

=== Baths of water ===
In addition to washing their face at the fountains, pilgrims can immerse in baths filled with Lourdes water (called piscines in French, meaning "pools"). This is also meant to repeat a gesture made by Bernadette Soubirous during the apparitions as she washed herself with the water after she was told to do so by the "lady". The original baths were built in 1862 and the current baths in 1955. They are located on the western side of the grotto along the Massabielle rock. Pilgrims are helped by volunteers for a full immersion into the bath. Each year about 350,000 pilgrims bathe. It is not allowed to take pictures or videos.

=== Chapels of light ===
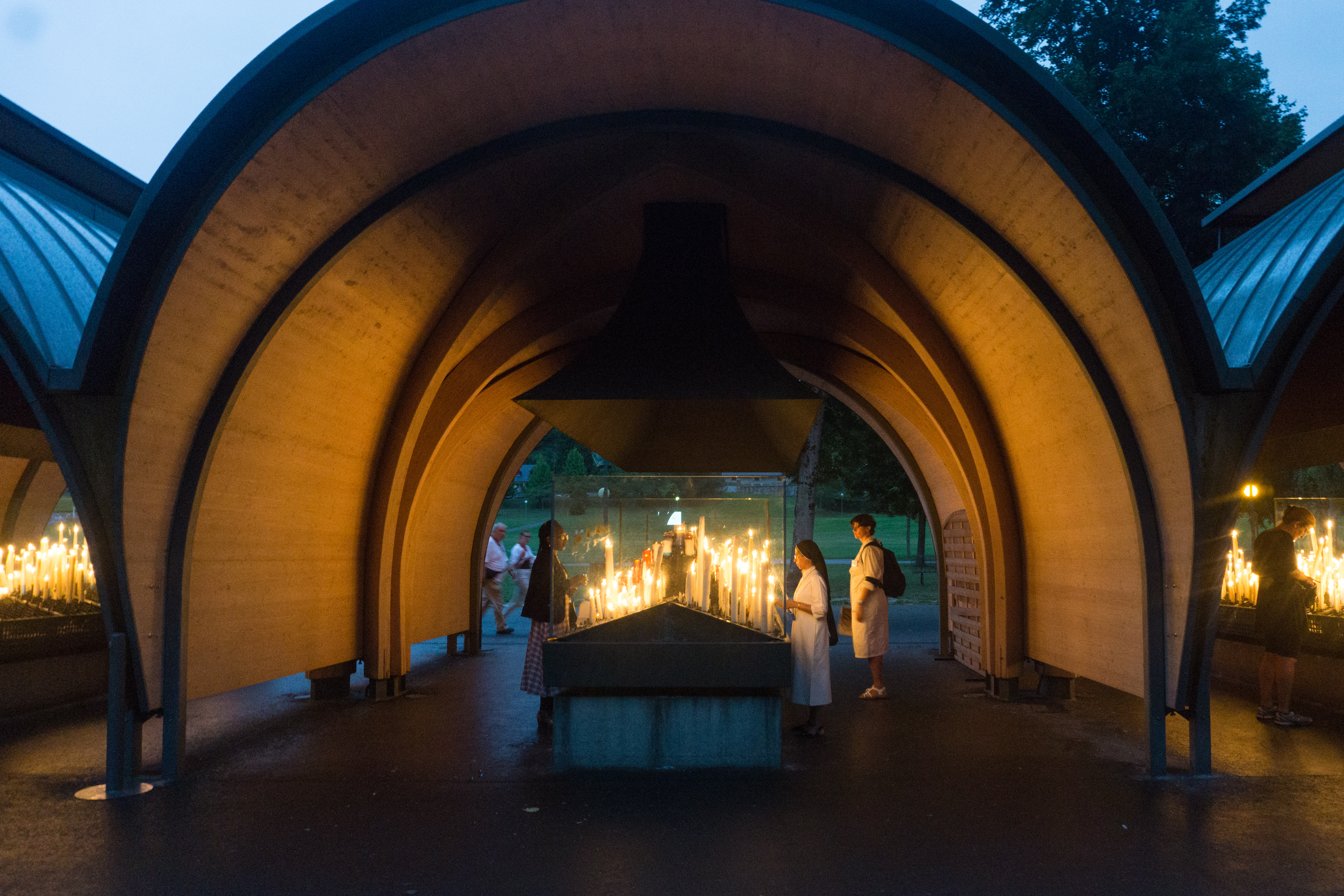
Inside one of the chapels of light

Lighting a votive candle is another religious gesture that Bernadette Soubirous made during the apparitions and which is now part of the Lourdes pilgrimage. Pilgrims used to light candles near the grotto, along the Massabielle rock. Now they have to cross the Gave de Pau river on a new bridge to reach the "chapels of light", where all candles are meant to be lighted. Around 800 tonnes of wax is burnt annually in devotional candles. Pilgrims can place candles of various sizes, some of them bring large candles from their respective parishes. The candle burners are tended by a staff of feutiers, attendants whose job is to ensure candles are burnt safely and evenly and to remove the trays of melted wax which collects under each burner. In July 2022, four candle chapels were damaged by a fire caused by candles and are currently closed.

== Additional religious sites ==
In addition to the three basilicas and the grotto area, the sanctuary has various places of worship and places intended for the pilgrims.

=== Church of St. Bernadette ===
The most recent of the major centres of worship is the Church of St. Bernadette, which was consecrated in 1988. It was built opposite the grotto across the river, on the spot where Bernadette Soubirous stood during the 18th and final apparition on 16 July 1858.

The Church of St. Bernadette is a brutalist building with comparatively little adornment. It was designed to allow as much natural light as possible into the nave, and light-coloured materials have been used, making it noticeably brighter than the Underground Basilica. It was designed by the architect Jean-Paul Felix.

It is also a more versatile building. The nave has provision for 5,000 seated worshippers and 350 wheelchairs, but partitions can be drawn to divide the nave into smaller sections. In addition, it includes the hemicycle, a large lecture room which may be used for worship, and an assortment of conference rooms and smaller rooms which may be used for devotional or non-devotional activity.

=== Chapel of reconciliation ===
The chapel of reconciliation formerly occupied a site slightly more remote, at the entrance of the upper stations of the Cross. It was moved several years ago into a more prominent position, into the building previously known as the Accueil Notre Dame, near the crowned statue and facing the esplanade.

The chapel of reconciliation is somewhat unusual in that no Masses or other services take place there; instead it is given over entirely to the sacrament of reconciliation. Priests from different countries observe a duty roster, which means that, at almost any time of day, pilgrims from Europe (and occasionally further away) can find a priest who will hear their confession in their own language.

=== St. Joseph's Chapel ===
St. Joseph's Chapel, named in honor of Mary's husband Saint Joseph, is situated at the far end of the esplanade, near St. Michael's Gate. It is a modern, concrete church, mostly underground, with little natural light. It was also designed by Pierre Vago, and was consecrated on 1 May 1968. It has provision for 450 seated worshipers and 80 wheelchairs.

=== Rosary Square ===
Looking out onto Rosary Square from the roof of the Rosary Basilica

The open space in front of the Rosary Basilica is known as "Rosary Square". The entrances to the Upper Basilica and its crypt, both of which are built on top of the Massabielle rock, are far above ground level. To facilitate access, two enormous ramps were constructed, which curve down either side of Rosary Square. The image of the entrance of the Rosary Basilica, flanked by the two ramps and surmounted by the spires of the Upper Basilica, has become one of the iconic symbols of Lourdes, and a stylised form of this image has been adopted by the sanctuary itself as its logo.

=== Crowned statue ===
The statue of the Crowned Virgin is a statue of Our Lady of Lourdes very similar to the statue in the grotto of Massabielle. It has been known as the "crowned statue" after its canonical coronation on 3 July 1876 by papal legate Pier Francesco Meglia. The statue stands across Rosary Square from the Rosary Basilica and faces the entrance. This prominent statue is a familiar landmark and a traditional meeting point. The statue is 2.5m high and cast in bronze, painted white and blue in the traditional colours. Her rosary is of the Birgittine style and incorporates six decades. Behind the Crowned Statue is the Esplanade, a large open walkway which is used for the processions.

=== Prairie ===
Across the Gave from the grotto is a wide, open, uncluttered space covered with grass and known in French as the prairie, or in English, the meadow. In the corner of the prairie is the tent-like chapel of adoration, consecrated in 1995 and given over entirely to adoration of the Blessed Sacrament. There is also an open-air altar for outdoor ceremonies. In 2002 the Water Walk was introduced, across the Gave and slightly downstream from the grotto. It consists of a series of nine stations of the Cross at which there is a small Lourdes water font.

=== Calvary ===
The sanctuary include a calvary built on the Espelugues hill, located south of the grotto and the basilicas. The Espelugues hill is separated from the central part of the sanctuary by the avenue Mgr Théas and the route de la Forêt. The Espelugues lands extending over the hill were acquired by the missionaries of Garaison, which were in charge of the sanctuary's administration. The first station was built in 1901, and the calvary was inaugurated in 1912.

The stations of the Cross feature a total of 115 characters which are slightly larger than average human size. The calvary extends on a course of around 1,500 meters (4,900 ft), starting close to the Basilica of the Immaculate Conception and climbing up to the 13th station then descending back to the basilicas and the grotto. It includes the fourteen traditional stations of the passion of Christ and a fifteenth station, the resurrection of Christ, added in 1958. To reach the first station, a stone staircase of 28 steps is reminiscent of the Scala Sancta in Rome, with some pilgrims also climbing it and on their knees.

== Accommodation ==
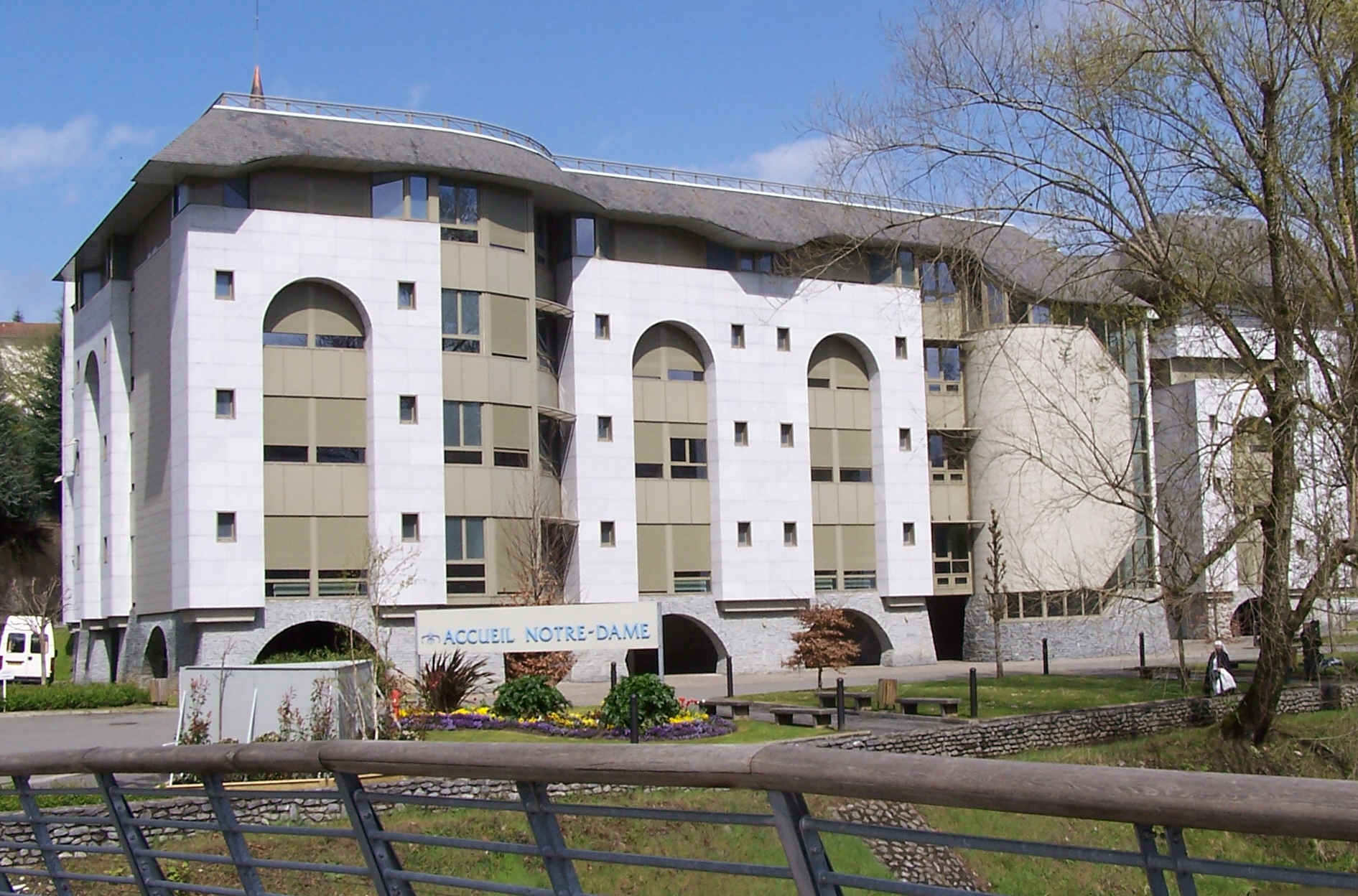
The Accueil Notre Dame

Across the river from the grotto and the churches is the Accueil Notre Dame, a modern facility built in 1996 to house sick pilgrims during their time in Lourdes.

The Accueil Notre Dame was built to replace two older residencies for pilgrims. The old Accueil Notre Dame stood opposite the Underground Basilica, and has been extensively remodelled, being divided into two buildings by removing a section. One building now contains the Chapel of Reconciliation, which used to be the refectory, and also houses the convent of the Sisters of Charity of Nevers. The other section is now known as the Accueil John Paul II, and contains several chapels, the First Aid post and Dispensary, and the offices of the Hospitalité. The other was the Accueil St. Bernadette, which stood across the river from the old Accueil Notre Dame, and was demolished to make way for the new one.

Since Easter 1997 sick pilgrims from all over the world have been housed in the Accueil Notre Dame, an airy modern building. The Accueil is organised into two wings, each consisting of six storeys, with the Reception area on the ground floor and the Transit Lounge on the fifth. Each floor from one to four is named after a specific saint, with female saints honoured on one side and male ones on the other. Each floor has a central refectory area where pilgrims congregate to eat.

The rooms, each with bathroom and shower, accommodate from one to six people. Each room has a window, with some fortunate ones having a view of the grotto, and storage cupboards and a table and chairs. Each room opens onto a communal area.

Linking the two sides is the Administration Area, with two panoramic lifts bringing visitors to each floor. The administration offices are on the sixth and seventh floors, and there are kitchens for each side.

Typically, pilgrims arrive at the Accueil Notre Dame in specially adapted buses, either from Tarbes Airport or Lourdes train station, and will be welcomed in the transit lounge from where they are taken to their rooms.

Another residency, the Accueil Marie St. Frai, is located a short distance outside the sanctuary; it is similar in design and atmosphere to the Accueil Notre Dame.

== Criticism ==
Modern Lourdes contains many souvenir shops. Some visitors may dislike the commercialism of parts of Lourdes, with neon-emblazoned shops overflowing with what Malcolm Muggeridge, a supporter of the shrine, called "tawdry relics, the bric-a-brac of piety". Bernadette herself despised any and all commercialization related to the apparitions. Lourdes has been called the "Disneyland of the Catholic Church". Critics argue that the Lourdes phenomenon is nothing more than a significant money-spinner for the town and the region, which therefore has a strong vested interest in keeping the pilgrims coming. The Church, however, distances itself from commercialisation. The many trinket stalls are privately owned, and hawkers are strictly forbidden inside the sanctuary.

Claims for miraculous occurrences at Lourdes that underlie its emergence as a destination for pilgrims were contested by Émile Zola in his novel "Lourdes" and in arguments with its critics.

== See also ==
- Hospitalité Notre Dame de Lourdes
- Roman Catholic Marian churches
- Shrines to the Virgin Mary
- Faith healing
- List of Christian pilgrimage sites
- Wax Museum of Lourdes
