= Lourdes water =

Water which flows from a spring in Lourdes, France

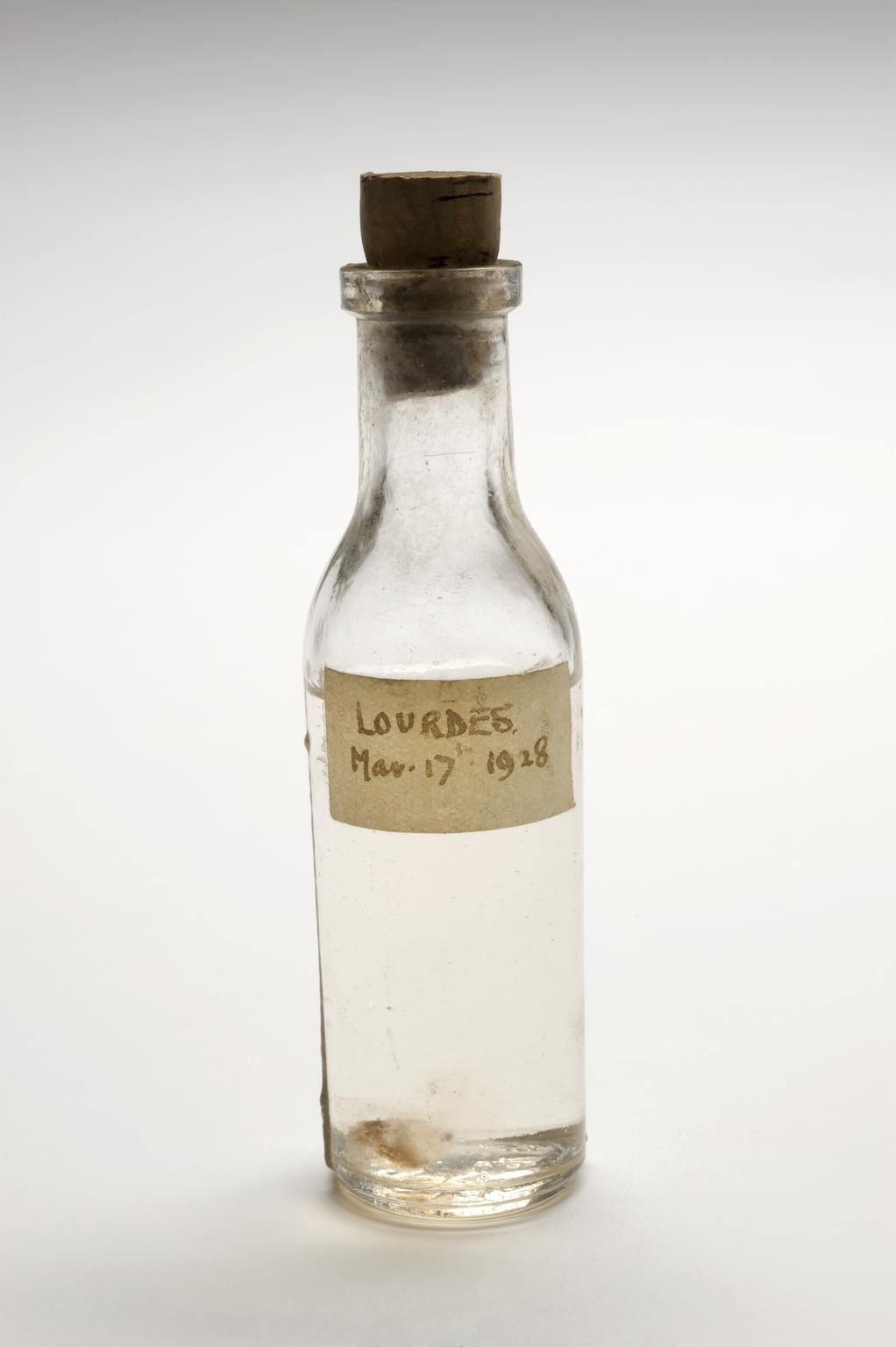
Water collected at Lourdes. 1928.

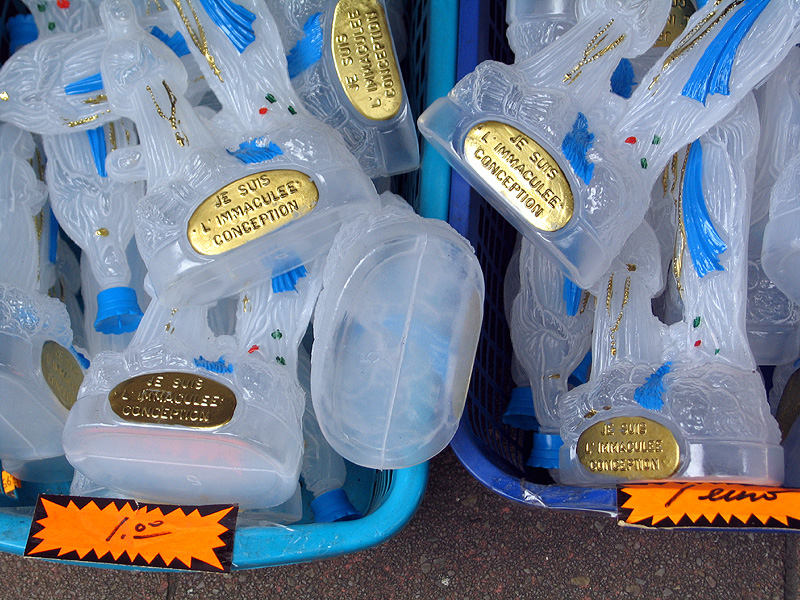
Plastic containers being sold in 2005 for collecting Lourdes water

Lourdes water is water which flows from a spring in the Grotto of Massabielle in the Sanctuary of Our Lady of Lourdes, France. According to Catholic tradition, the location of the spring was described to Bernadette Soubirous by an apparition of Our Lady of Lourdes on 25 February 1858. Since that time, many millions of pilgrims to Lourdes have followed the instruction of the Blessed Virgin Mary to "drink at the spring and bathe in it".

Since the reports on the apparitions, thousands of people have claimed to have been cured by drinking or bathing in the water, and the Lourdes authorities provide it free of charge. The Catholic Church has officially recognized 72 miraculous healings from Lourdes, while some scientists attribute the healings to the placebo effect.

== Chemical analysis ==
An analysis of the water was commissioned by the French politician Anselme Lacadé in 1858. It was conducted by a professor in Toulouse, who determined that the water was potable and that it contained the following: oxygen, nitrogen, carbonic acid, carbonates of lime and magnesia, a trace of carbonate of iron, an alkaline carbonate or silicate, chlorides of potassium and sodium, traces of sulphates of potassium and soda, traces of ammonia, and traces of iodine.

Essentially, the water is quite pure and inert. Lacadé had hoped that Lourdes water might have special mineral properties which would allow him to develop Lourdes into a spa town, to compete with neighbouring Cauterets and Bagnères-de-Bigorre.

== Bathing ==
Primitive makeshift bathing installations were constructed in the 1850s by local builders. Until 1880 there were only two pools, filled by a manual pump. In 1880, a wooden bathing-house containing fourteen pools (French: piscines) was constructed.

The French author Émile Zola visited the Sanctuary of Lourdes in 1891 and again in 1892, and wrote of the pools' unsanitary conditions:

And the water was not exactly inviting. The Grotto Fathers were afraid that the output of the spring would be insufficient, so in those days they had the water in the pools changed just twice a day. As some hundred patients passed through the same water, you can imagine what a horrible slop it was at the end. There was everything in it: threads of blood, sloughed-off skin, scabs, bits of cloth and bandage, an abominable soup of ills... the miracle was that anyone emerged alive from this human slime.

During the 1897 Jubilee Pilgrimage to Lourdes, the priest François Picard was thirsty after a long day. Rather than drinking fresh water, he asked an assistant to fill his glass from a bathing pool, heavily contaminated from the sick pilgrims who had been immersed in it. "When the father had received [the water], he made the sign of the cross and drank slowly, right to the end. Then, he gave back the glass and concluded with a smile: "The water of the good Mother of Heaven is always delicious."

The next set of baths was completed in 1891, and tiled in the Virgin's blue. This building was located near to where the water taps are now and can be seen on old photographs of the Domain.

The current baths were constructed in 1955, and upgraded in 1972 and 1980. There are seventeen separate bath cubicles, eleven for women and six for men. Each year about 350,000 people use the baths.

The water is not heated and is usually cold; the temperature is around 12 °C (54 °F). The immersion lasts around a minute, during which time prayers are recited, and veneration of a nearby statue of the Virgin is encouraged. Pilgrims are aided by one or two volunteer attendants; pilgrims with mobility disabilities sometimes require additional accommodations. The water in each bath is constantly topped up and refreshed via a pump. It is now constantly circulated and purified by irradiation.

== Modern times ==
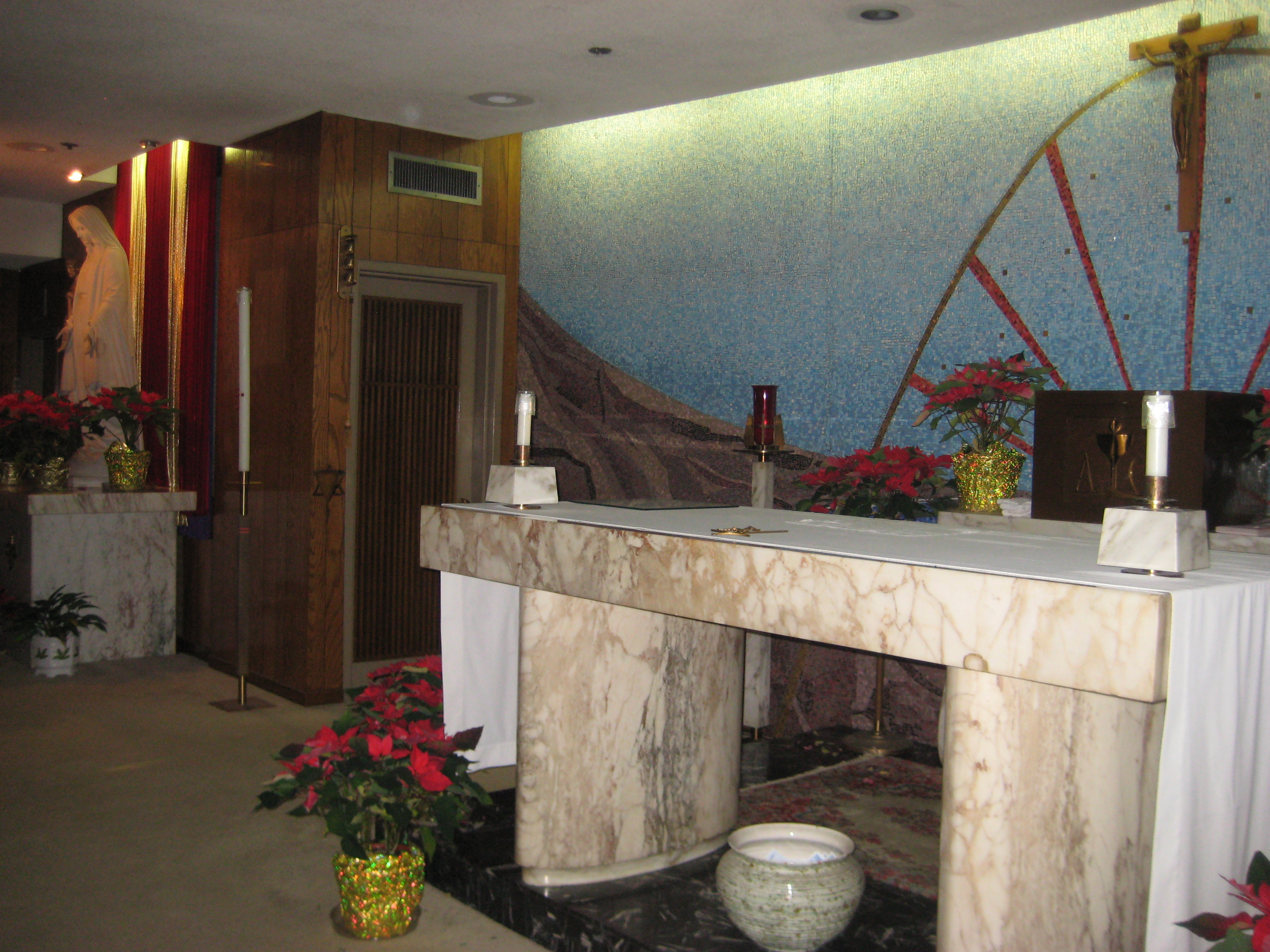
Operated by the Marist Fathers, The Lourdes Center in Kenmore Square (Boston, Massachusetts) was established in 1950 by Cardinal Richard J. Cushing and Bishop Pierre-Marie Theas to distribute Lourdes water in the United States.

Lourdes water flows from a spring in the back area of Grotto at the same spot where it was discovered by Bernadette. At maximum, the water flows at 40 litres per minute. The water is collected in a cistern, and dispensed via a system of taps near the shrine, where pilgrims may drink it or collect it in bottles or other containers to take with them. The original spring can be seen within the Grotto, lit from below, and protected by a glass screen.

Lourdes water in individual plastic bottles for distribution

Over the last few years the system of taps has been progressively altered. As of 2008, water is dispensed from a series of taps set into stone in a circle around the base of one of the smaller towers of the Upper Basilica.

In 2002 the Water Walk was introduced, across the Gave river and slightly downstream from the Grotto. It consists of a series of nine stations at which there is a small Lourdes water font. The stations form a walkway along the Gave which can be followed in either direction. As they walk, pilgrims are invited to wash or drink, and meditate on passages from the Bible. Each station carries a title of the Virgin Mary, such as "Queen of the Apostles", "Mother of Good Counsel", and "Our Lady of Light".

Traditionally, pilgrims collect gallons of water at the taps to be given to family and friends unable to make the trip to Lourdes. As of summer 2007, Mistral Air passengers on pilgrimage to Lourdes were forbidden to bring containers of water on the plane. Officials at Tarbes Airport said this was in keeping with new anti-terrorism regulations about liquids following the 2006 transatlantic aircraft plot.

== See also ==
- List of Christian pilgrimage sites
