= Diocese of Shrewsbury Lourdes Pilgrimage =

Catholic diocese in England

"The Roman Catholic Diocese of Shrewsbury serves the population of New Cheshire, Shropshire, Telford and Wrekin with parts of Derbyshire, Halton, Merseyside, Greater Manchester and Warrington." Administratively the Diocese is part of the Archdiocese province of Birmingham.

The Shrewsbury Diocesan Pilgrimage to Lourdes is an annual undertaking for over 1000 pilgrims from across the Diocese to the shrine town of Lourdes in Southern France. Traditionally the pilgrimage takes place during the last week of July.

== History ==
The formal history of the pilgrimage begins on 2 January 1951 when the then Bishop of Shrewsbury, Bishop Murphy, proposed "to form a committee to make arrangements for an annual pilgrimage to Lourdes."

The first pilgrimage, under the direction of Fr Nixon, was organised for that year, and on Tuesday September 4, 1951 a pilgrimage train set off from Birkenhead Woodside carrying 360 pilgrims, calling at Chester and Crewe en route to Folkestone. The pilgrims then crossed by ferry to Boulogne, before taking another train, arriving in Lourdes at 6 p.m. on 5 September. The return journey followed the same pattern, leaving Lourdes at 10:30 a.m. on 11 September. On that first pilgrimage a pilgrim travelling first class would have paid the princely sum of £25.

By the early 1960s the pilgrimage had grown to include an element travelling by air, to coincide with the pilgrimage train, although this was considered no more than "alright", and in 1964 the original Pilgrimage Director Fr Nixon was succeeded by Fr Carroll. In 1969 Fr Carroll made the decision to bring the Diocesan Pilgrimage under the auspices of the Catholic Association and the pilgrimage dates moved to coincide with the association dates (18–25 August in that year).

In the early seventies there was much discussion regarding linking with other local Dioceses, both Salford and Liverpool being suggested, or even restricting the pilgrimage to alternate years. These discussions eventually led to a break away from the Catholic Association, and a further change of dates to late July, coinciding, over time, with both Liverpool and Salford. Rising costs (by 1976 the cost was £175) further promoted the prospect of a linked or diminished pilgrimage, however the Pilgrimage has remained steadfastly individual.

Following the breakaway from the Catholic Association, the pilgrimage retained the use of a number of different travel agents, with varying degrees of success, however by the mid-1990s concerns about further increasing costs led to the decision being made for the Diocese to go it alone, and since 1995/96 the Diocese has operated a truly independent pilgrimage, aided by the Maison du Pelerin as a booking agent in Lourdes.

Coinciding with the move to independence were two other significant decisions, a return of the pilgrimage flight, which had been discontinued in the 1970s, and a move away from the overnight sleeper train to the modern TGV for the journey through France, the UK rail journey having been replaced by coaches in the mid-1980s.

By 2008 the pilgrimage had grown to over 1500, travelling on 2 official flights, 2 TGV trains fed by 12 coaches, as well as a number of direct coach groups.

== Current pilgrimage ==
The Pilgrimage travel is organised by the current Director, Fr David Long, and a team of unpaid volunteers. Although some pilgrims make their own way, the vast majority travel on the Diocesan coaches and ferry to the port of Calais in the North of France, and then on to Lourdes on chartered TGVs. The team also arranges the charter of a flight for those Pilgrims who are unable to travel for the 24 hours overland.

Pilgrims can stay in a range of hotels, available for most budgets, whilst those who need constant care or medical support are accommodated in the Accueil Notre Dame where they are looked after by a medical team, led by the Matron, of doctors and nurses. However many pilgrims choose to stay in hotels and avail themselves of the assistance provided by the Diocese of Shrewsbury Lourdes Hospitalité to ensure that no one misses out on the Lourdes experience. Between the medical team and the Hospitalité over 600 helpers are co-ordinated and over 200 pilgrims are assisted through their stay in Lourdes.

In 2010, due to the availability of TGV stock, the pilgrimage will once again be travelling on an overnight sleeper train through France, in addition to a direct chartered flight from Manchester to Lourdes.

== See also ==
- Roman Catholic Diocese of Shrewsbury
- Diocese of Shrewsbury Lourdes Hospitalité
- Hospitalité Notre Dame de Lourdes
- Association of British Lourdes Pilgrimage Hospitalités
- Sanctuary of Our Lady of Lourdes
