= Association of British Lourdes Pilgrimage Hospitalités =

The Association of British Lourdes Pilgrimage Hospitalités (ABLPH) was founded in 1985/86 as a forum for the many groups involved in organising pilgrimages to the shrine of Lourdes. The main role of the association is to allow members to share / discuss good practice, experiences and fellowship, as well as providing a focal point for spreading news and information from the various shrine authorities.

Members formally meet once a year (typically a weekend in February) to discuss issues of mutual concern, to encourage communication, and to meet with representatives of the Sanctuaries and the Hospitalité Notre Dame de Lourdes. This meeting includes workshops and discussions relating to issues that affect Lourdes pilgrims as well as the Annual General Meeting of the Association.

== Membership ==
Membership of the association is open to pilgrimage hospitalités from across England, Scotland and Wales, either diocesan in nature or representative of other pilgrimage bodies, as well as representatives of other groups who regularly undertake pilgrimages to Lourdes from Britain.

Association members include...

- Catholic Association Pilgrimage
- Liverpool hospitalité
- Diocese of Shrewsbury Lourdes Hospitalité
- HCPT – The Pilgrimage Trust
- Salford Hospitality of Our Lady of Lourdes
- Archdiocese of St Andrews & Edinburgh - Hospitalité
- Diocese of Westminster

== See also ==
- Lourdes
- Hospitalité Notre Dame de Lourdes
- Pilgrimages
