= Diocese of Shrewsbury Lourdes Hospitalité =

The Diocese of Shrewsbury Lourdes Hospitalité (also often Hospitality) is an affiliate of the Hospitalité Notre Dame de Lourdes and the Association of British Lourdes Pilgrimage Hospitalités.

The Diocesan Hospitalité exists to promote service and devotion to Lourdes and to provide support and assistance to the annual Diocese of Shrewsbury Pilgrimage to the shrine, both in practical and organisational ways. Throughout each year the Diocesan Hospitalité is challenged to ensure that every member of the diocesan pilgrimage community is given the opportunity to fully experience Lourdes, and to be a part of the services and processions that make up the pilgrims’ day. The nature of Lourdes means that each pilgrimage has to fit in with a tight schedule of meals, processions and services that are strictly timetabled. There is little scope for deviation, even allowing for the vagaries of the Lourdes climate.

This task is made manageable by bringing together all the groups under the Hospitalité leadership, working with the Diocesan Youth Service, and allocating specific duties to teams on a rota basis. Hopefully this ensures that enough helpers are available when needed, and that the workload is distributed evenly. Helpers in Lourdes are often referred to as Brancardiers and the senior helper for the pilgrimage is referred to as the Chief Brancardier.

The Chief Brancardier is assisted in the day-to-day running of the duties by a team of deputies, and by the Duty Team Leaders. The medical care of pilgrims is undertaken by a team of doctors and nurses, overseen by the Pilgrimage Matron, who also meet throughout the year to plan for the pilgrimage. In a similar manner to the teams of helpers, the nurses work on a shift rota, with different teams taking different duties, and it is the senior nurse on duty who is responsible for supervising the provision of care on the wards in the Accueil. Currently the Hospitalité are responsible for co-ordinating almost 600 helpers, including almost 500 youth, and assisting approximately 200 pilgrims who require daily assistance during their stay in Lourdes.

== Membership ==
Membership of the Hospitalité is open to anybody who has completed 3 years service on the diocesan pilgrimage, and is awarded during their third pilgrimage, whilst in Lourdes. Members make a commitment to supporting the pilgrimage, as and when possible and pay a subscription to support the Hospitalité.

During the enrolment service members are given a badge, often referred to as a Hospitality Medal, as recognition of their commitment to the Hospitalité.

On occasion an invitation to Honorary membership may be extended to individuals who have made significant contributions to the Hospitalité, or to the Diocesan Pilgrimage community.

== Structure ==
The Hospitalité council consists of the President, vice-president, Secretary, Treasurer, Chief Brancardier and representatives of the pilgrimage helpers and youth groups. Typically the representatives are also either members of the Deputies team or Duty Team Leaders.

The President and Chief Brancardier are appointed by the Pilgrimage Director and Bishop, and frequently in the history of the Hospitalité these roles have been combined, and this is currently the case. The vice-president, Secretary and Treasurer are elected by the membership, normally at an Annual General Meeting (Typically held early in September each year.).

The Deputies team is appointed by the Chief Brancardier, and is made up of a small number of experienced Hospitalité members as well as the Pilgrimage Hotel Team Leader.

Each year the management team appoints a number of Duty Team Leaders from across the pilgrimage to lead the helper teams.

== Lourdes Duties ==
The pilgrimage rota is drawn up to ensure that we have enough helpers available when they are required, and to hopefully maximise opportunities for helpers to gain the most from their Lourdes experience. Within the rota there are a number of different duties, and each of these brings with it different responsibilities and requirements.

=== Ward Duty ===
Put simply, this is working on the wards, alongside the Nursing team, giving assistance with meals, cleaning and general domestic tasks. A large part of this duty is also talking to the pilgrims. Normally there is very little requirement for any personal care. Only 20 helpers are allocated to the wards at any time, and it is preferred if they are from across the groups within the team, so that as many as possible can share in this valuable part of Lourdes. There will also be some “mature” helpers who will also be working on the wards, assisting with the kitchen, cleaning and signing in routines.

=== Service and Hospitality Duty ===
The main part of this duty is to allow the pilgrims staying in the Accueil to enjoy as great a Lourdes experience as possible. Therefore, a large part of this duty is assisting those pilgrims to partake in the ceremonies and processions that make up the pilgrimage schedule. However, an equally important part is giving the pilgrims the opportunity to experience elements of Lourdes at their own pace, and to sample the town outside the gates and socialise. As well as allowing pilgrims some time out, the helpers on this shift may also be asked to assist with the marshalling and co-ordination of the Torchlight procession, working in conjunction with the Hospitalité Notre Dame de Lourdes.

== See also ==
- Roman Catholic Diocese of Shrewsbury
- Diocese Of Shrewsbury Lourdes Pilgrimage
- Hospitalité Notre Dame de Lourdes
- Association of British Lourdes Pilgrimage Hospitalités
- Sanctuary of Our Lady of Lourdes
