= Jack Traynor =

Jack Traynor may refer to:

- John Traynor (Royal Marine), paralysed Royal Marine cured by a miracle at Lourdes
- Jack Traynor (soccer) (born 1987), American soccer player

== See also ==
- John Traynor (disambiguation)
