= John Traynor =

John Traynor may refer to:

- John Traynor (footballer) (born 1966), Scottish professional footballer
- Jay Traynor (1943–2014), American singer
- John Traynor (criminal) (1948–2021), Irish criminal
- John T. Traynor (1926–2021), American politician
- John Traynor (Lourdes pilgrim) (1883–1943)

== See also ==
- Jack Traynor (disambiguation)
