= Catholic Association Pilgrimage =

The Catholic Association of the UK, abbreviated to the CA, has been around in one form or another since 1881 and ran its first pilgrimage to Lourdes in 1901. Its objects are set out in the Memorandum and Articles but its main purpose is to mastermind the CA Annual Pilgrimage to Lourdes, currently incorporating the diocesan pilgrimages of Clifton Diocese, East Anglia Diocese, Northampton Diocese, Southwark Archdiocese, and the Stonyhurst College Lourdes Pilgrimage and British Province of the Carmelites Pilgrimage. Each of these groups is overseen by a Diocesan Director. The entire Pilgrimage is coordinated by the Pilgrimage Director and the Pilgrimage Management Committee, and takes place at the end of August.

The CA is a registered charity.

== History ==
The Catholic Association was founded in 1891, with the approval and blessing of Cardinal Manning. Its original objects are stated in its Rules as being;

To promote unity and good fellowship among Catholics by organising lectures, concerts, dances, whist tournaments, excursions, and other gatherings of a social character, and to assist, whenever possible, in the work of Catholic organization, and in the protection and advancement of Catholic interests.

It was particularly successful in the organization of pilgrimages to Rome and other places of Catholic interest.

The first pilgrimage to Lourdes took place in September 1901 and became the forerunner of what now the CA Annual.

The Second World War brought the activities of the Association to a halt. However, in 1947 the organisation of pilgrimage resumed with the first to Lourdes in that year. The Catholic Association was responsible for organising the HCPT pilgrimage at Easter until that pilgrimage separated to make its own arrangements. A similar situation arose when the pilgrimage of the burgeoning diocese of Arundel and Brighton was removed from the Catholic Association by the Bishop, Michael Bowen. That Diocese now has a very successful pilgrimage to Lourdes in July each year.

In the 1970s, it ceased trading as a travel agent and registered as a charity. The sole purpose of the charity is to mastermind the Pilgrimage.

In 2026, the CA is celebrating 125 years since the first pilgrimage to Lourdes.

A list of previous officials is available on their website.

== How the Pilgrimage works ==
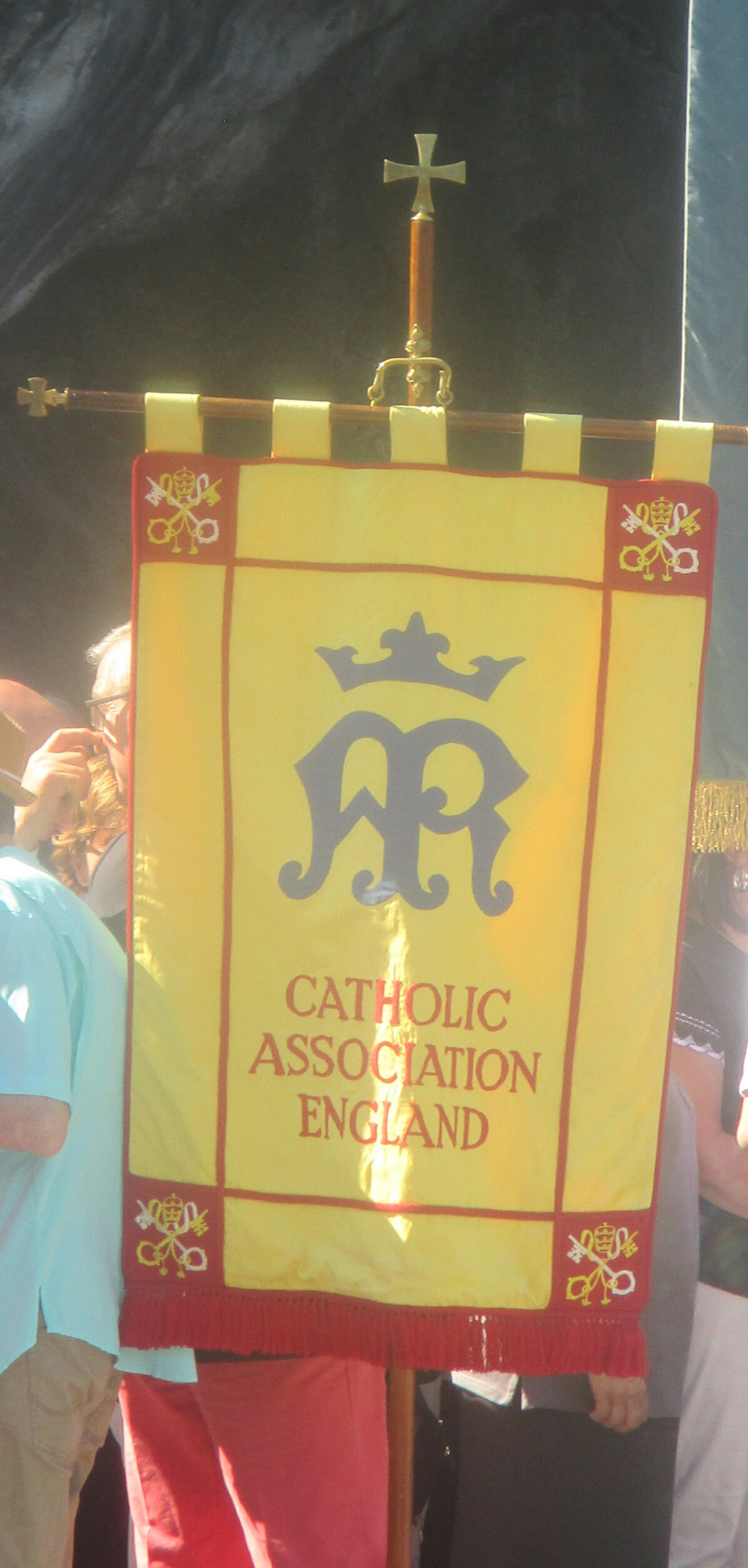
Processional banner of the Catholic Association in Lourdes.

The CA is a 'Company Limited by Guarantee and not having a Share Capital.' It is also a Registered Charity (number 1071120). The Catholic Association is a company and the Directors are registered as such, although the Directors refer to themselves as Trustees.

=== Catholic Association Trust ===
The Trustees fulfill the usual role of Trustees, which is to guard the funds, but they also appoint key executives; appoint the liturgical and spiritual team; oversee all the policies, risk assessments, Safeguarding, training, DBS, insurance; appoint a travel agent (currently - and for the last 50 years - Tangney Tours); co-ordinate with the seven diocesan and group directors; convene twice or so a year a meeting of the trustees, PEG, the Liturgy Group, and the DDs (when combined we call that the Pilgrimage Management Committee); are the duct for bookings with the authorities in Lourdes; settle the weekly programme with PEG, the DDs, the Liturgy Group and the Sanctuaries; consider the various winds of change effecting pilgrimages, particularly to Lourdes; maintain and refresh a strong and appropriate trustee board.

The Trustees appoint Pilgrimage Officers (the heads of the different service sections including doctors, nurses, brancardiers, handmaids, youth group etc.). The Pilgrimage Officers, together with the Diocesan Directors, make up the Pilgrimage Management Committee (PMC). Trustees are permitted to attend meetings of the PMC but, apart from two or three who have specific functions there, it is generally thought that the PMC should be allowed to manage itself. There is some overlap of membership and responsibilities between the Trustees, the PMC, and the Hospitalité Council.

=== Pilgrimage Management Committee ===
The Trustees appoint Pilgrimage Officers (the heads of the different service sections including doctors, nurses, handmaids, youth group, etc.). The Pilgrimage Officers, together with the Diocesan Directors, make up the Pilgrimage Management Committee (PMC). There is some overlap of membership and responsibilities between the Trustees, the PMC, PEG and the Hospitalité Council. The PMC is responsible for the actual organisation and practicalities of the annual Lourdes pilgrimage.

=== PEG ===
The Pilgrimage Executive Committee (or PEG) is made up of all Heads of Service, Leader of Glanfield, and the Young Helper's Group Leaders plus any trustees required (it is chaired by one).

=== Catholic Association Hospitalité ===
The Catholic Association Hospitalité of Our Lady of Lourdes – CA Hospitalité for short – exists to bind together the volunteer pilgrims, known in French as Hospitalier(e)s, who help in the service of all pilgrims – especially 'sick pilgrims' – during the Pilgrimage: doctors, nurses, handmaids (female helpers), brancardiers (male helpers), chaplains, and praying members. The Hospitalité is a religious sodality in the Catholic Church, with a strong social and spiritual element and it is affiliated to the Hospitalité Notre Dame de Lourdes (the central Hospitalité coordinating most volunteers in Lourdes throughout the year).

The CA Hospitalité is governed by a Council consisting of some ex officio members who are Pilgrimage Officers (on the Pilgrimage Management Committee), and three members elected each for three years on a 'rolling' programme. The Council elects its own Officers, the President has a seat on the PMC, and the Council has power to co-opt members for a specific purpose. The Council is the driving force of the Hospitalité and looks after everything connected to the Sick Pilgrims.

The principal aims and objects of the CA Hospitalité are set out in the Constitution (and summarised above the application for membership) as follows:

a. To serve sick pilgrims going to Lourdes on the Catholic Association Pilgrimage and to help in the smooth running of religious and other activities involving sick pilgrims on that Pilgrimage under the direction of and in collaboration with the Pilgrimage Directors and Heads of Service.

b. To strengthen the bonds of fraternal life between its members and to help them maintain their obligations as Christians, their responsibilities in the Church and their devotion to Our Lady. This service consists especially of looking after the material needs of the sick pilgrims although the obligation of a member of the Hospitalité is not limited to material work. Members will be expected to help all pilgrims to benefit fully from the religious and social benefits of a pilgrimage to Lourdes.

Volunteer pilgrims may apply for membership of the Hospitalité on conclusion of their first pilgrimage. The Hospitalité Council may admit to the membership any class of person or individual who, in their opinion, renders suitable services to the sick. Following approval by the Hospitalité Council, applicants will be admitted to ordinary membership during their next pilgrimage to Lourdes, having made an Act of Consecration before the Patron or Chaplain. After working with the Pilgrimage for a further two years as members, helpers may apply for admission to full membership of the Hospitalité the following year. The Hospitalité Council may also invite 'Sick Pilgrims' to become full members of the Hospitalité who support the organisation through their prayers.

It is worth remembering that members are encouraged to take the Spirit of Lourdes home with them and to promote the pilgrimage, in particular by recruiting other volunteers and by making known the facilities provided for Sick Pilgrims, both those who need to stay in an Accueil (house of welcome for the sick) and others who would be better served in a hotel.

The CA Hospitalité is also affiliated to the Association of British Lourdes Pilgrimage Hospitalités.

==== UK Hospitalité Events ====
- Each year the Catholic Association holds an AGM for all members.
- Every two years the Catholic Association runs a retreat at Walsingham.

=== Volunteering ===
The CA relies on volunteer helpers to work with the various assisted pilgrims (sick) who come to Lourdes each year. The CA divides their volunteers up into services (with a Head of Service for each of these):

- Brancardiers (male non medical helpers). The Chief Brancardier is their Head of Service.
- Handmaids (female non medical helpers). The Chief Handmaid is their Head of Service.
- Nurses. The Chief Nurse is their Head of Service.
- Doctors. The Chief Medical Officer is their Head of Service.

Each service works in teams to look after the assisted pilgrims in the Accueil and in hotels. The brancs and handmaids are in mixed teams; and the two heads of service work together in various areas of assisted pilgrim care.

==== Music Group ====
The CA also searches for volunteers to be part of their music group, which plays at all the services and events during the Pilgrimage. The group look for singers and those who can play musical instruments. Volunteers must always bring their own instruments.

=== Pilgrimage main events ===
Whilst small details will change from year to year, like most of the large-scale pilgrimages to Lourdes, the Catholic Association pilgrimage includes certain recurring events:

- Pilgrimage Candle
- Opening Mass
- Prayer on the Prairie
- Opening Party
- Mass at the Grotto (normally on the Monday morning)
- Blessed Sacrament Procession
- Marian Torchlight Procession
- Sacrament of Reconciliation
- Baths
- Outing to Quo gig
- Anointing of the Sick
- Hospitalite Service
- Children's Mass (led by the Glanfield group)
- Stations of the Cross
- Pilgrimage Photos
- Diocesan Events (Mass and sometimes a party)
- Passage through the Grotto
- Accueil Party (last night)
- Going Forth Mass (On the last morning of the Pilgrimage)

=== Health & Safety ===
Like all pilgrimages the CA has an extensive Health & Safety Policy.

== Note ==
The Catholic Association of the UK is not to be confused with that set up by Daniel O'Connell, founded in Ireland.

== See also ==
- Lourdes
- Our Lady of Lourdes
- Marian apparitions
- Bernadette Soubirous
