= Liverpool hospitalité =

British voluntary organisation

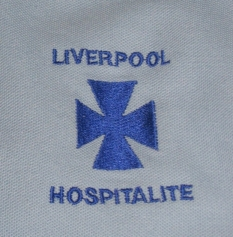
Liverpool Hospitalité badge

The Liverpool Hospitalité is a voluntary organisation associated with the annual Liverpool Archdiocesan Pilgrimage to Lourdes. The Hospitalité of Our Lady of Lourdes (Liverpool Branch) spend their pilgrimage caring for those who need support both while travelling and whilst in Lourdes. They also provide support for registered sick and disabled pilgrims who are able to stay in hotels. Like all Hospitalités of Lourdes, it is connected to the shrine's own Hospitalité Notre Dame de Lourdes.

The first official Liverpool Pilgrimage took place in 1923, during which Mr Jack Traynor, a man with severe war wounds, was spontaneously cured. He lived to return to Lourdes acting as a Brancardier many times and was one of the pre-war Presidents of the Brancardiers Association.

Until November 1927, when the Liverpool Association of Handmaids was formed, the volunteers to help the nursing staff with the care and transportation of the sick pilgrims were obtained by simply appealing to actual pilgrims either just before departure or in Lourdes itself. With the ever increasing numbers of sick cases it was realised that a permanent organisation of voluntary helpers who would be prepared to work in raising funds and to go as often as possible with the Liverpool Pilgrimage was needed.

The Association came into being at a meeting held in St John's Hall, Kirkdale in November 1927 and so regular work in assisting with the Pilgrimage on a year-round basis began. During 1928 the Confraternity of the Hospitalité of Lourdes was raised by the Pope to the rank of an Archconfraternity with the power to affiliate similar diocesan organisations and in July 1928 a petition was sent to Lourdes for affiliation of the Liverpool Association. This was granted and so all the registered members are entitled to gain the indulgences of the Archconfraternity.

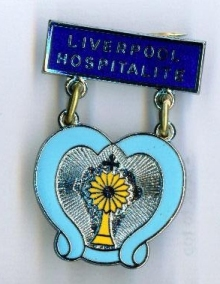
Liverpool Hospitalité service medal

In the years of World War II there were no Pilgrimages and the opportunity was taken after consultation with the Lourdes Hospitalité to revise the constitutions of the Brancardiers and the Handmaids Associations. The new constitutions were approved and signed by the Archbishop of Liverpool on 14 May 1948, with subsequent revision in 1974. In 1998 the constitution was comprehensively amended and this combined Brancardier and Handmaid associations. Hospitalité members are all now known as Hospitaliers.

In July 2023, Liverpool Archdiocese celebrated the centenary of the first pilgrimage. There was a noticeable increase in the number of new Hospitalité members as well as former members returning after a break.

The Hospitalité present their members with service medals. After three years service a Hospitalier will receive a heart shaped medal with a blue bar, after five this will be replaced by one with a red bar and for 10 years service a yellow bar is received. These medals are not worn as a decoration - they are merely to indicate the level of experience that member has. This is reflected by the fact that there are no further medals received after 10 years despite some members having served with the Hospitalité for as many as fifty or more pilgrimages.

== Related ==
- Hospitalité Notre Dame de Lourdes
- Catholic Association Pilgrimage
- Liverpool Archdiocese
