= HNDL =

HNDL may refer to:

- Harvest now, decrypt later
- Hospitalité Notre Dame de Lourdes
