= Château fort de Lourdes =

Historic castle in Hautes-Pyrénées, France

Coordinates: 43°5′48″N 0°2′57″W

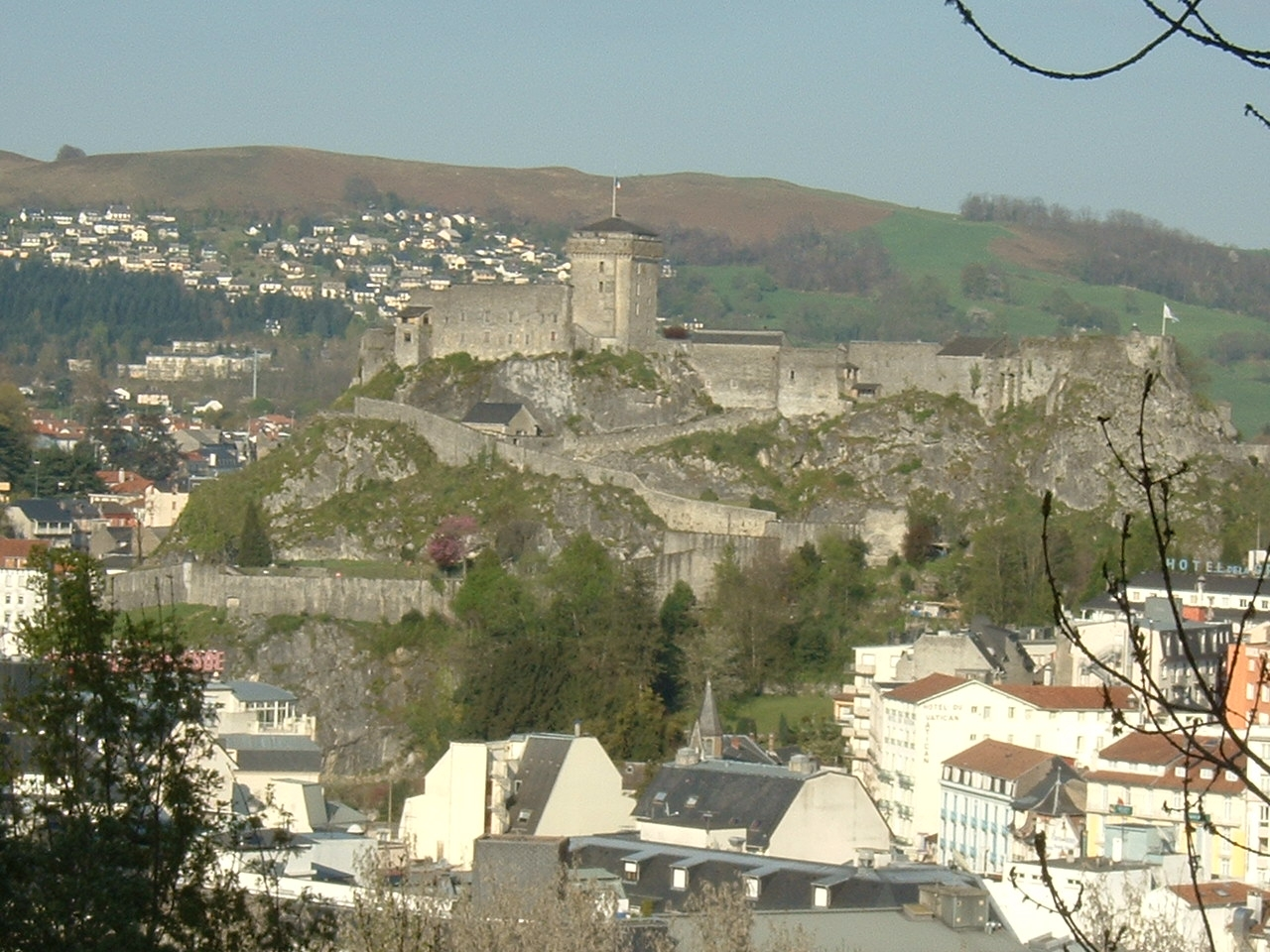
View from south-west

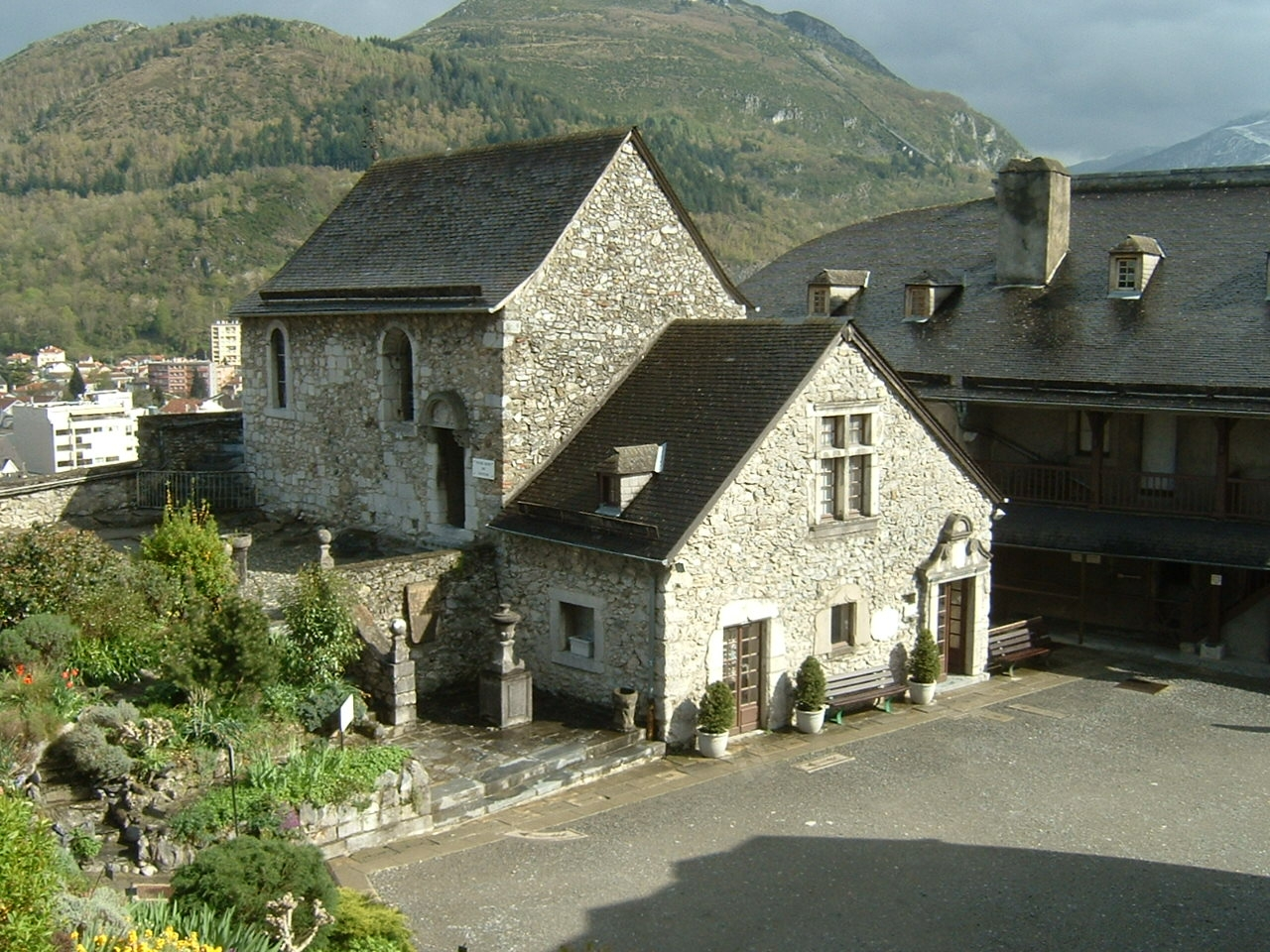
The Notre-Dame-du-Château chapel

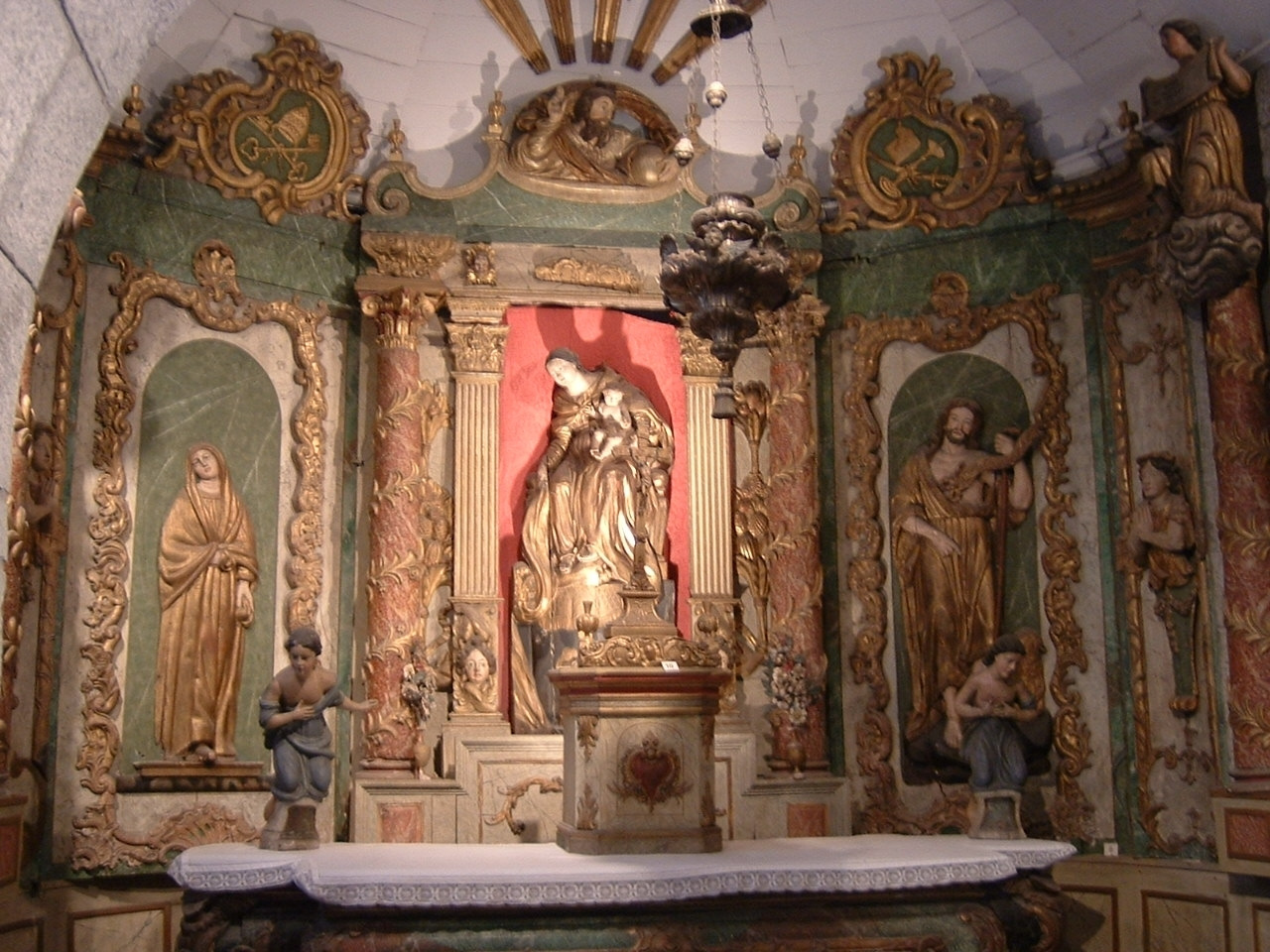
Altar from Saint-Pierre de Lourdes, now in the chapel

The château fort de Lourdes (Gascon: Castèth de Lorda) is a historic castle located in Lourdes in the Hautes-Pyrénées département of France. It is strategically placed at the entrance to the seven valleys of the Lavedan. Since 1933, it has been listed as a monument historique by the French Ministry of Culture.

== History ==
Besieged in 778 by Charlemagne, it became the residence of the Counts of Bigorre in the 11th and 12th centuries. In the 13th century, it passed into the possession of the Counts of Champagne, part of the kingdom of Navarre before coming under the crown of France under Philippe le Bel. It was ceded to the English by the Treaty of Brétigny in 1360, before returning to France at the start of the 15th century after two sieges. In the 17th century, the castle became a royal prison, and then a state prison after the French Revolution. It continued in this role until the start of the 20th century, when it became the Pyrenean Museum (Musée Pyrénéen) (1921) which it remains

== Description ==
The castle's origins go back to Roman times. Various remains from this era (fragments of sculpture, votive offerings, wall foundations) were brought to light by military engineering work in the 19th century, which however destructed the greater part of the ancient walls. The finds are exhibited on the site.

Today, the oldest remains date from the 11th and 12th centuries and consist of the foundations of the present fortifications. The castle was reinforced in the 13th and 14th centuries (construction of the keep), and again in the 17th and 19th centuries. From 1590, under the reign of Henri IV, the castle became a prison. It was later used as a barracks, before becoming a museum around the turn of the 20th century.

The Notre-Dame-du-Château chapel houses the furniture of the former parish church of Saint-Pierre de Lourdes, destroyed in 1904. The present chapel is constructed with recycled material from Saint-Pierre de Lourdes.

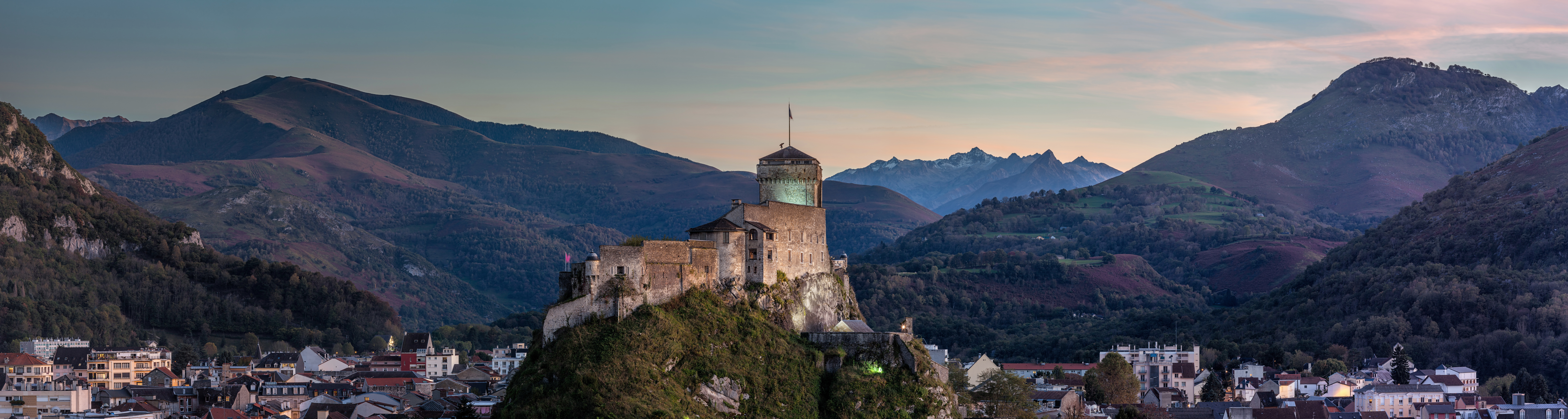
Panorama of Château fort de Lourdes, October 2017

== Photographic gallery ==
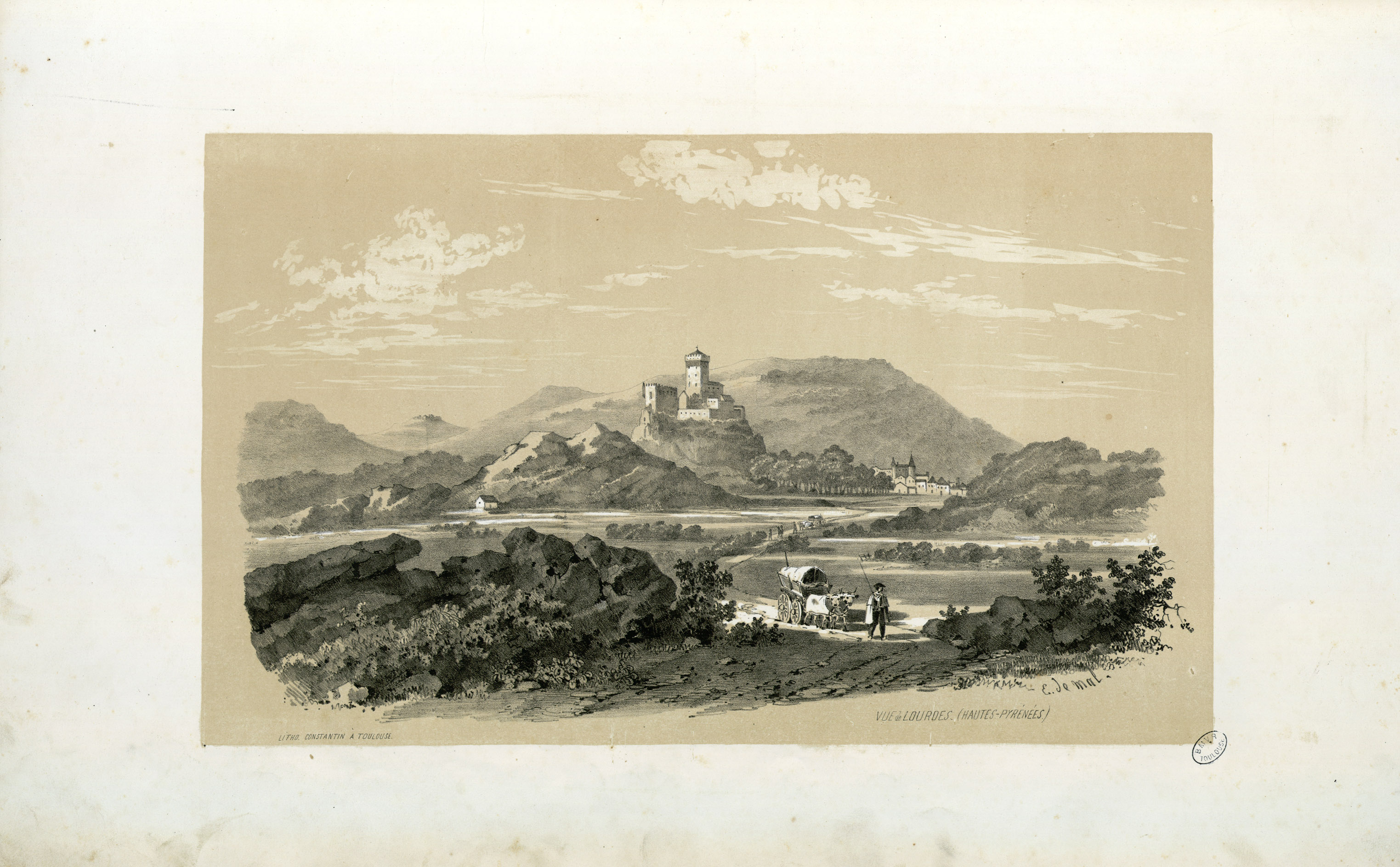
Castle in 1843, by Eugène de Malbos

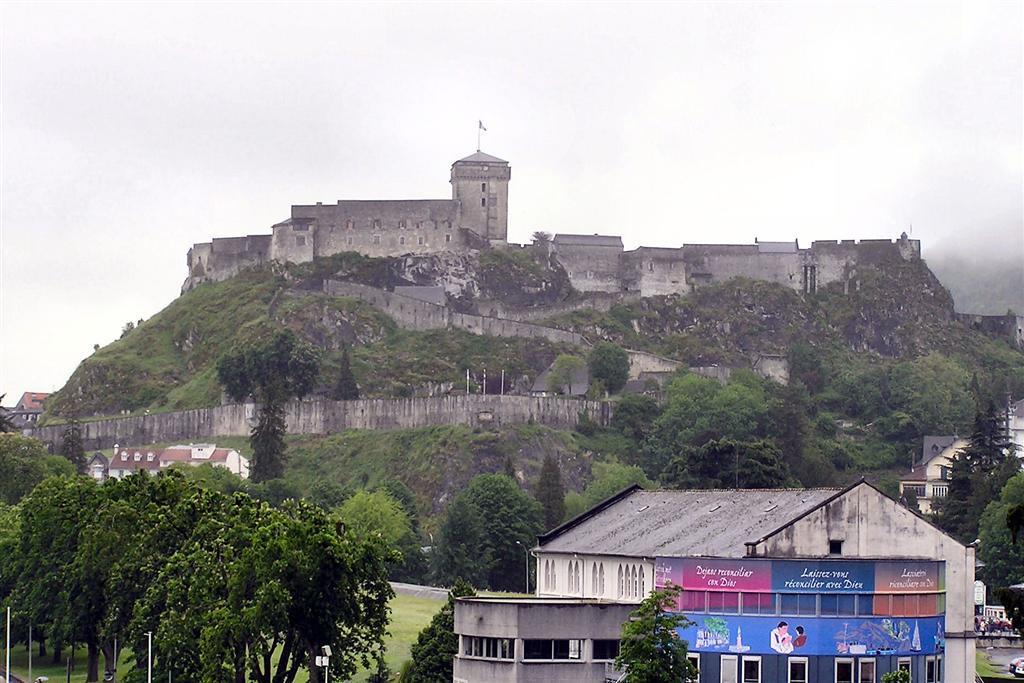
View from the west

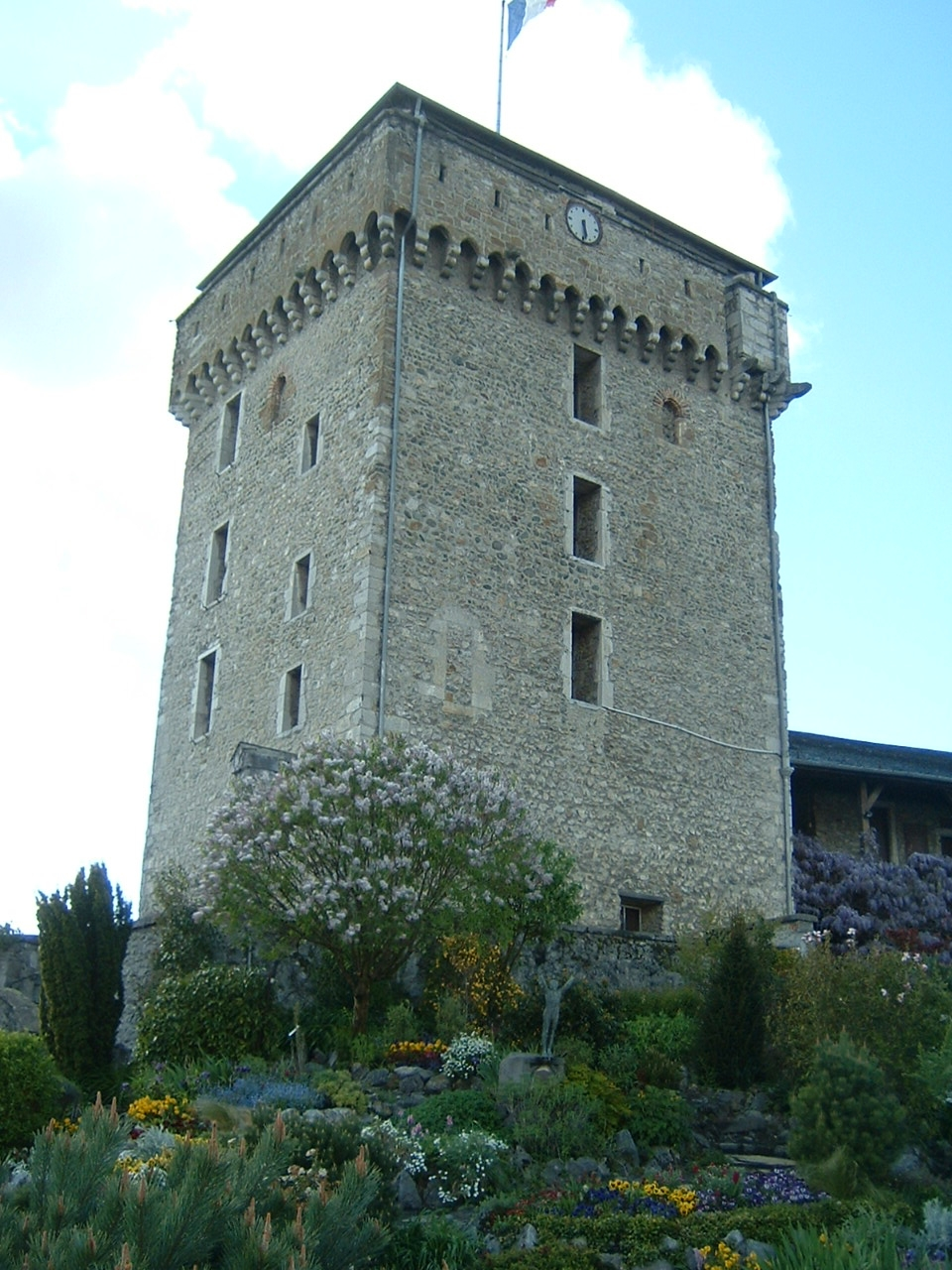
The keep

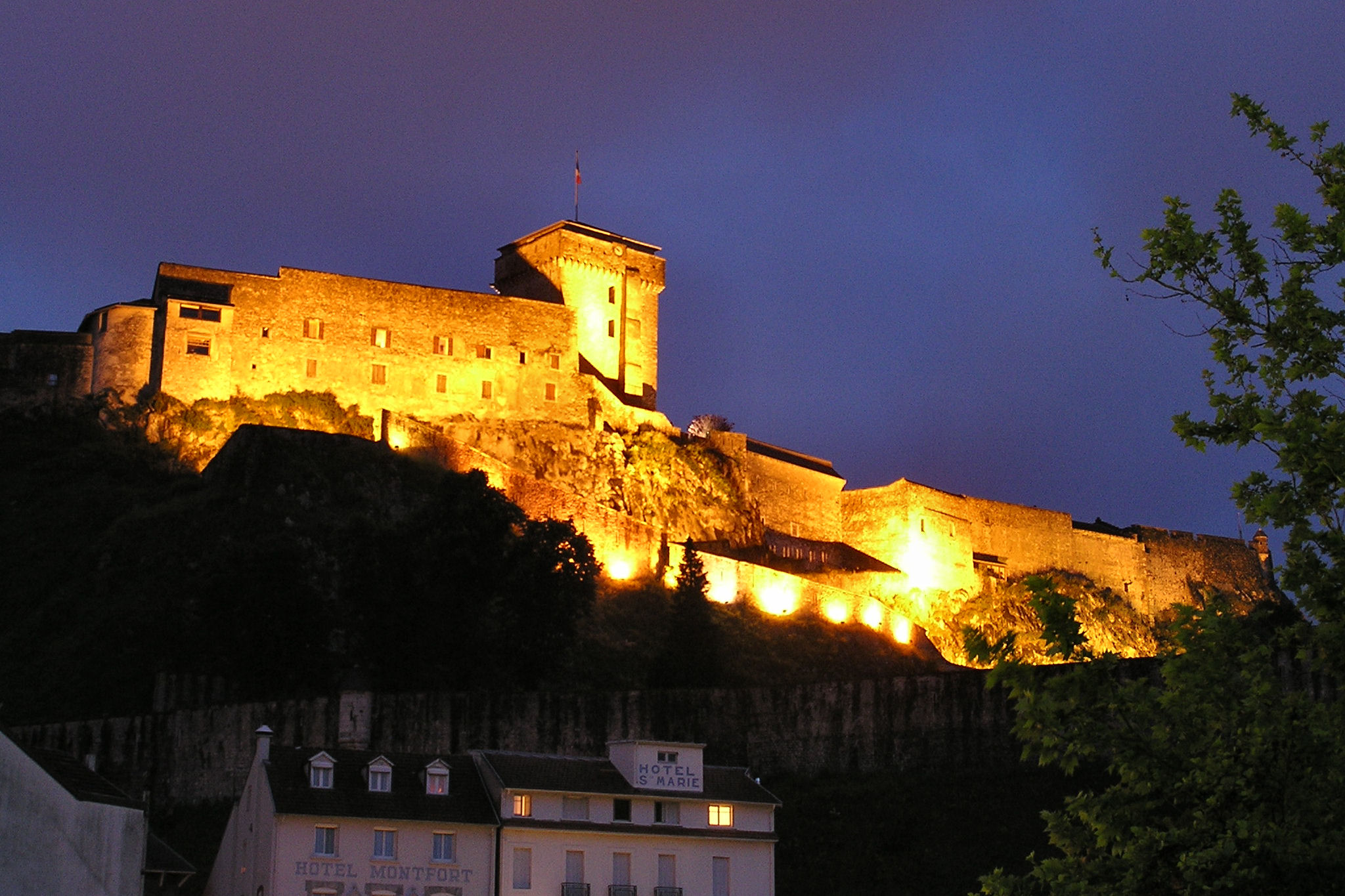
Illuminated at night

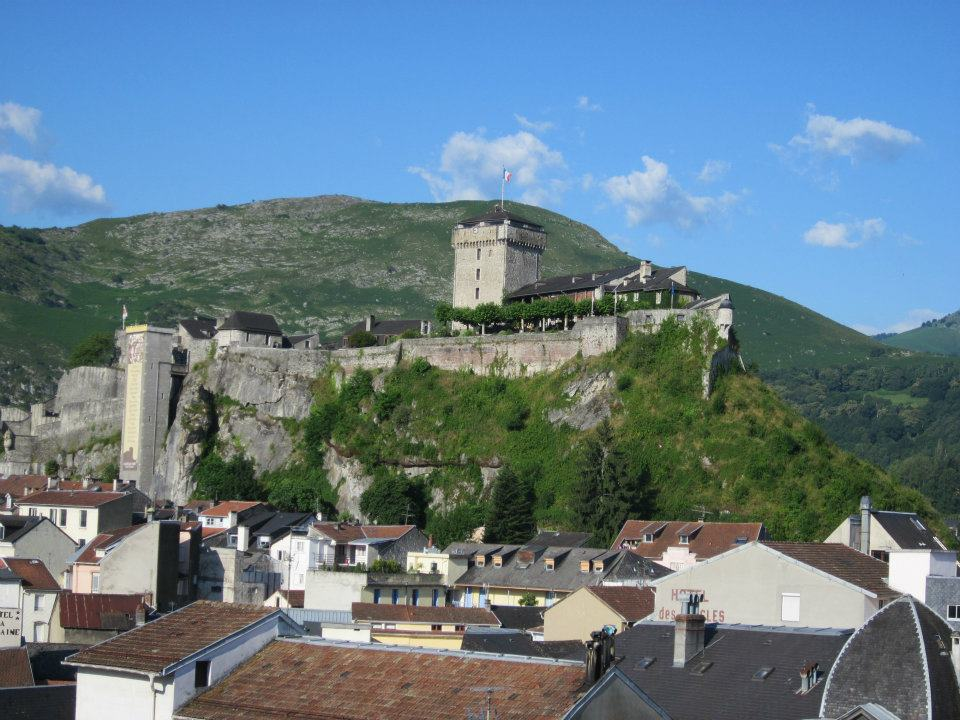
Castle (east face with the clock)

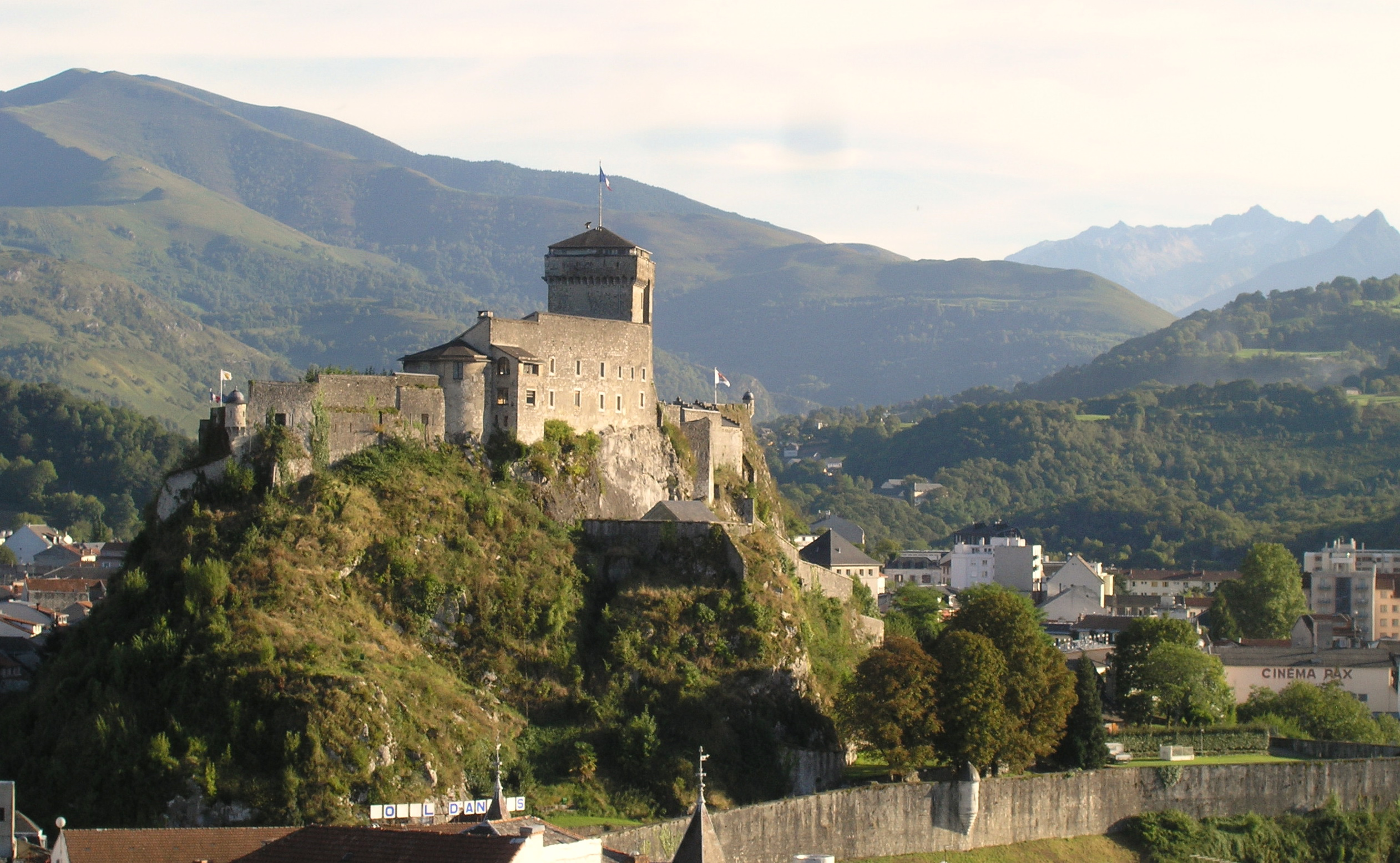
With the Pyrenees in the background

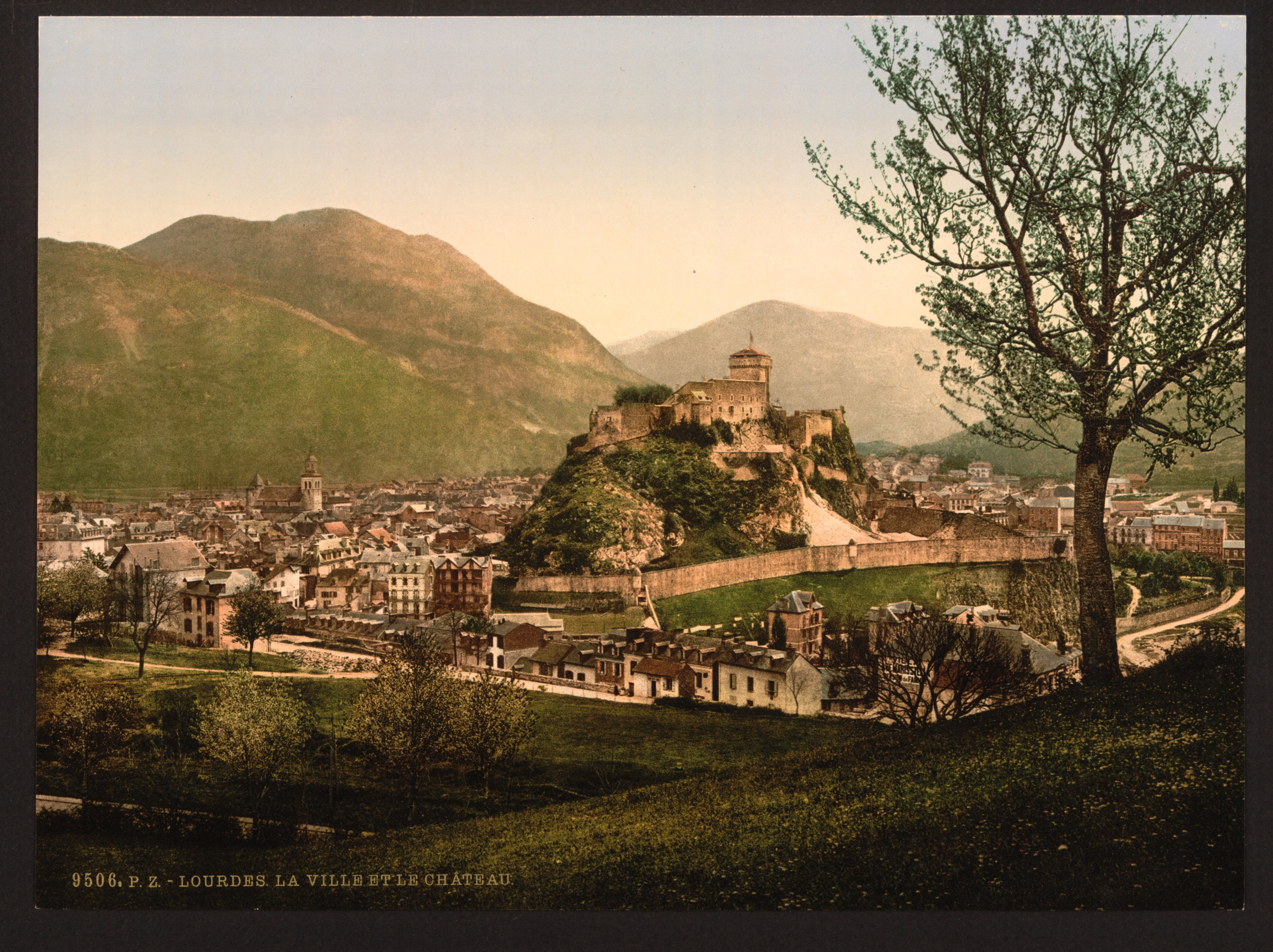
The castle standing over the town (photo taken between 1890 and 1900)

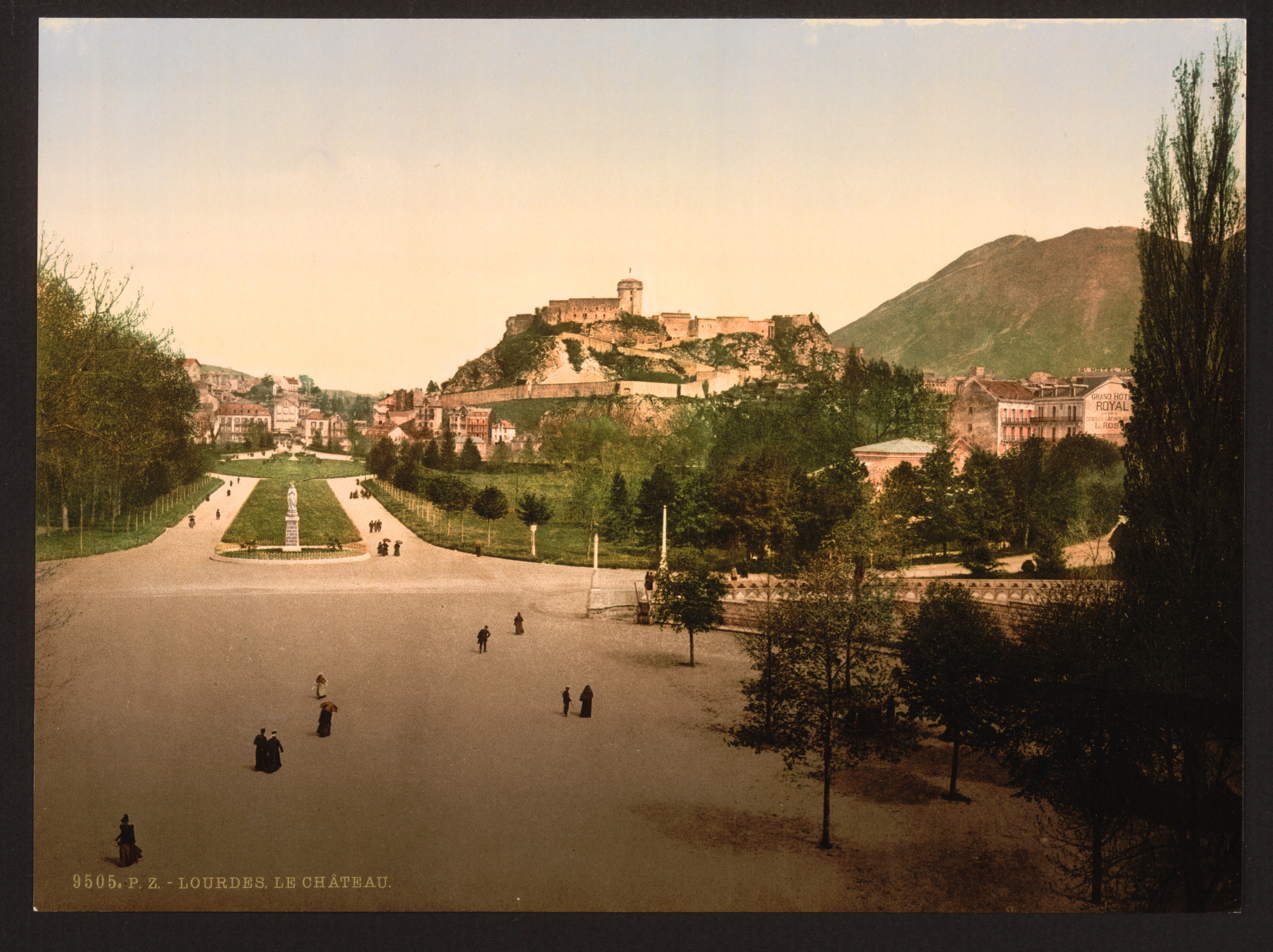
View from the terrace of Sanctuary of Our Lady of Lourdes

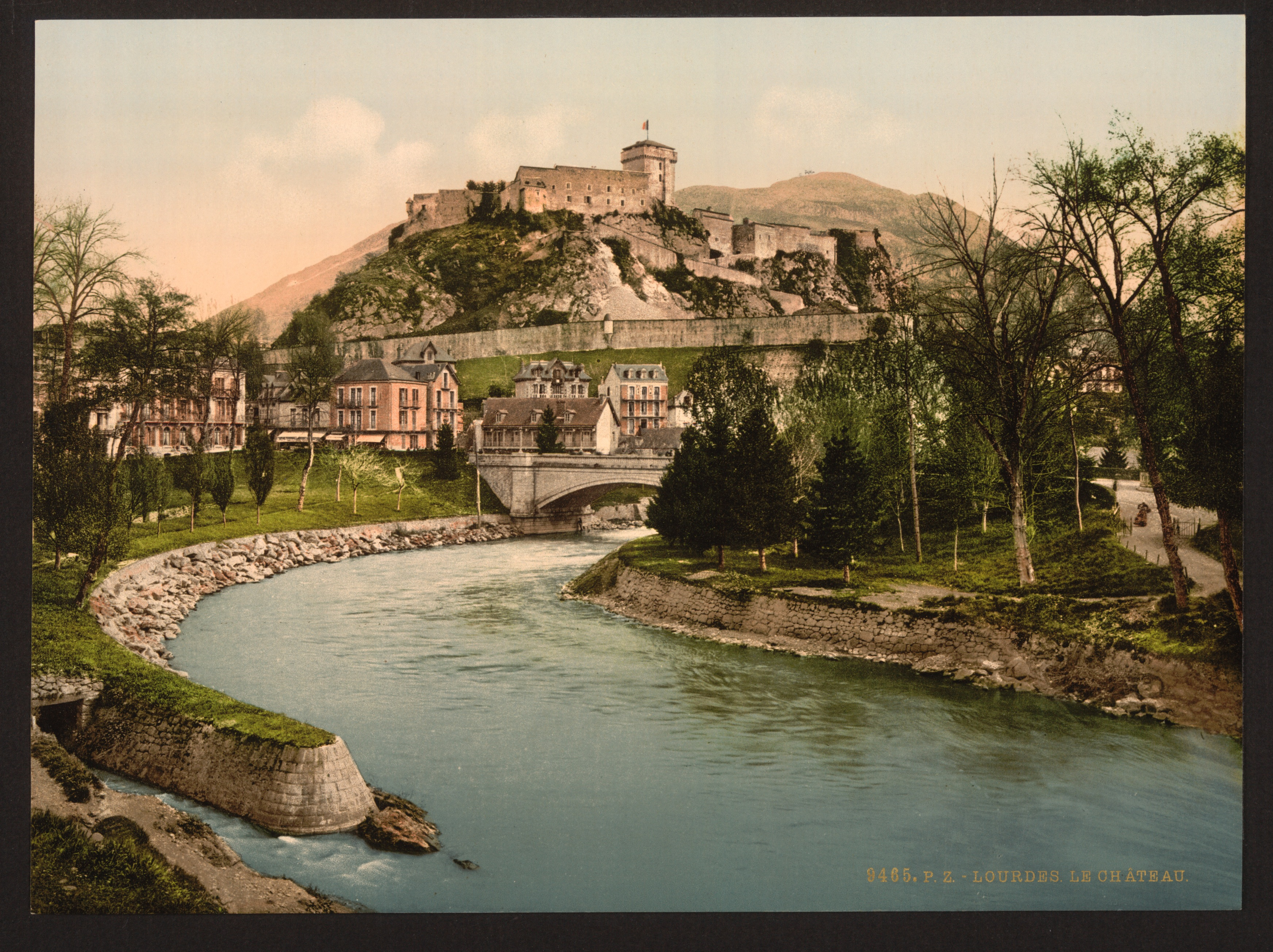
Castle and river

== See also ==
- List of castles in France
- Lourdes

== References and sources ==
- Lourdes de la Préhistoire à nos jours, Musée Pyrénéen, 1987.
