= John Traynor (Lourdes pilgrim) =

English soldier

John Traynor (1883–1943) was a Royal Marine severely wounded during the First World War. He lived as an invalid until 1923, when he joined with fellow Catholics from the Liverpool area and journeyed to the Catholic shrines at Lourdes.

== Biography ==
Traynor was born in Liverpool; his mother was a migrant from Ireland. He attended St. Patrick's Primary School, leaving school to become a sailor in the merchant marine. In 1907, he became a stoker in the Royal Navy Reserve, joining the regular Navy at the start of World War I. He was wounded near Bruges on 8 October 1914, but recovered. He was hit by machine gun fire on 8 May 1915 while participating in a bayonet charge in the Gallipoli Campaign, losing the use of his right arm and developing epilepsy, and he was discharged with an 80% pension.

In April 1920, a surgeon in Liverpool attempted to cure the epilepsy by trepanning, an operation that was reported to have resulted in the partial paralysis of both legs.

In 1923, he traveled to Lourdes with a group of pilgrims from Liverpool, dipping in the baths nine times. While there, he is said to have been cured. In his book, Battlefield Tourism: Pilgrimage and the Commemoration of the Great War in Britain, Australia and Canada, 1919–1939, David William Lloyd discusses Traynor as part of an interwar phenomenon of mass pilgrimage, with large numbers of British ex-servicemen making pilgrimages both to the replica of Lourdes at the Carfin Grotto and to Lourdes itself.

Upon his return to Liverpool, a crowd had assembled at Lime Street station to greet his arrival. John started a coal delivery business and returned to Lourdes as a stretcher bearer. He was one of the pre-war presidents of the Liverpool Brancardiers Association. The British Army refused to consider withdrawing his invalidity pensions awarded to him after he was originally wounded. Believers in Lourdes have identified John Traynor as the closest a British or Irish invalid has ever gotten to being officially pronounced a Lourdes miracle. In the context of Catholicism in Victorian England, various believers had identified him as the first British Catholic to be cured at Lourdes.

According to Patrick Marnham, "Wherever two or three British pilgrims are gathered together the story of John Traynor will sooner or later be told." In his lighthearted 2009 book, Detour De France: An Englishman in Search of a Continental Education, actor Michael Simkins visits Lourdes, describing Traynor as the "most famous" English pilgrim to claim a cure at the shrine.

In December 2024 his cure was officially recognised as a miracle.
