= HCPT – The Pilgrimage Trust =

HCPT (Hosanna House and Children's Pilgrimage Trust)
- Founded: 1956
- Founder: Michael Strode
- Purpose: Providing pilgrimage holidays to Lourdes
- Region served: UK and Ireland (IHCPT)
- Revenue: Fund raising
- Website: HCPT website

HCPT or Hosanna House and Children's Pilgrimage Trust is a United Kingdom based charity which travels with disabled and disadvantaged children and adults on pilgrimage to the Sanctuary of Our Lady of Lourdes, in Lourdes, France. HCPT stands for Hosanna House and Children's Pilgrimage Trust, Hosanna House being the property the organisation owns in the hills above Lourdes. It was founded in 1956 by Michael Strode.

== History ==
HCPT is a charity which was formed in 1956 when Dr. Michael Strode first took four children with disabilities on a pilgrimage holiday to Lourdes, establishing a new approach to pilgrimage for children with disabilities.

From HCPT grew the Hosanna House Trust, which was the response to a request from young adults for an opportunity to experience a similar holiday to that of the children. Today, Hosanna House, the Trust's residential centre just outside Lourdes in Bartrès, takes nearly 2,000 pilgrims in groups of 40 to 50, many of whom have disabilities or special needs. These guests stay for week between Easter and November.

In 1996, HCPT celebrated the 40th Anniversary of the Pilgrimage Trust. Here, the whole Pilgrimage, of around 5000 people, congregate in St Bernadette's Basilica for the Trust Mass, the culmination of which is the singing of the song 'Rise and Shine', the unofficial HCPT Anthem.

In 1998 HCPT and the Hosanna House Trust were combined as "HCPT - The Pilgrimage Trust".

== Pilgrimages today ==
HCPT takes around 1,000 children from the UK on its annual Easter pilgrimage - with groups from Ireland, Belgium, Croatia, Bosnia and Herzegovina, Poland, Romania, Slovakia, Spain, USA and West Indies joining it too. The total size of the Easter Pilgrimage is around 5000, which includes all helpers, nurses, doctors and chaplains.

A further 1,500 people stay at Hosanna House each year, in groups of up to 50. These groups welcome people of all ages.

HCPT also owns a villa in Bartrès, near Hosanna House. This is a self-catering house for up to 15 people which is accessible and available to all throughout the year.

== Activities ==
HCPT's pilgrimages are centered on the international Shrine of Our Lady of Lourdes and provide people of all ages and abilities the opportunity to participate in a group holiday. All are welcome to join the pilgrimage regardless of their faith or lack thereof.

== Fundraising ==
HCPT relies entirely on donations from the public and fundraising by its 250+ groups throughout the UK.

In 1999, Donnie Munro, former lead singer of the band Runrig, released a record in aid of HCPT which received the support of Frances Shand Kydd, the mother of Diana, Princess of Wales.
