= Hospitalité Notre Dame de Lourdes =

French Roman Catholic religious confraternity

The Hospitalité Notre Dame de Lourdes (HNDL) is a Roman Catholic religious confraternity under the spiritual authority of the Bishop of Tarbes and Lourdes, and works closely with the Rector of the Sanctuaries and his pastoral team.

Hospitalités were originally Catholic charitable organisations which welcomed and sheltered travellers, particularly those in need; in the 2020s, HNDL is the central co-ordinating Hospitalité for pilgrims to the Sanctuary of Our Lady of Lourdes, organising the reception of pilgrims, training of volunteers, crowd-control and other needs.

== Background ==
Five million visitors a year are welcomed by the volunteers who work in the Sanctuary of Our Lady of Lourdes. Some of these volunteers work in the Forum-Information Centre welcoming individual pilgrims and small groups. Other volunteers work in the Youth service, or give of their time and talent in one of the pavilion tents around the Domaine. However, the largest group of volunteers (16,000 of them) is known as the Hospitalité Notre-Dame de Lourdes (Hospitality of Our Lady of Lourdes). In the past a ‘Hospitality’ was a charitable organisation whose aim was to gather, accommodate and feed the less fortunate in a hostel or hospital. Today HNDL builds on that tradition, welcoming pilgrims to Lourdes (especially, but not only, the sick and disabled), and assisting at religious ceremonies. It is an organisation of pilgrims at the service of other pilgrims and Our Lady.

HNDL manages several programs including, Service Sainte Bernadette (training for Hospitallers), Service Saint Michel (accommodation and catering for Hospitallers), Saint Joseph Service (including airport welcome), Service Notre Dame at the Accueil Notre Dame, Saint Frai Service and Saint John the Baptist Service.

All Hospitalités around the world are connected to the HNDL.

== Structure ==
The HNDL was founded in 1885. The HNDL (and each of its sections) is governed by a President and a council. It is active in Lourdes during the main pilgrimage season (which normally lasts from Easter until November), and it also provides people to welcome pilgrims at the Piscines (Baths) during the winter. Through its work it aims to pass on the ‘message of Lourdes’. Members, known in French as hospitaliers, strive to do this not only in Lourdes but also in their home parishes and institutions, for the good of the church and the world.

== Stage service ==
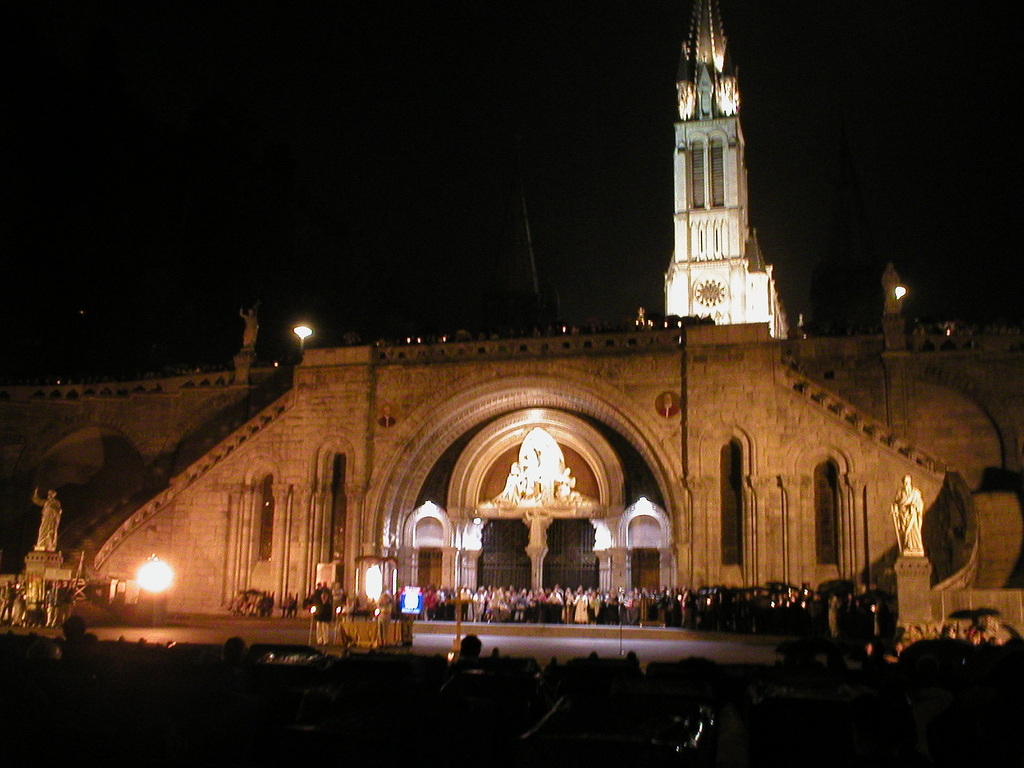
Basilica at night, during the Torchlight Procession

A period of service with the Hospitalité Notre-Dame de Lourdes is known as a ‘Stage’. The name 'Stage' comes from the French for 'work experience'. Those on Stage are often known as ‘stagiaires’ or more recently ‘hospitaliers auxiliaries’. The HNDL encourages people to do a Stage lasting at least 6 days.

The Stage is open to anyone over the age of 16 who has completed a pilgrimage to Lourdes and wishes to become a volunteer in the future; volunteers can complete a four-year programme to become full members. New helpers can be aged up to 75 (though 65 is the maximum age for someone to do their first Stage with a view to making their ‘engagement’ as a member of the Hospitalité on their fifth Stage). Doing a Stage requires dedication, a willingness to serve, and a certain maturity of character (though that doesn’t mean dullness). Stage offers tremendous satisfaction and opportunities to enjoy life in a group.

No special skills are required to be on stage, just a willingness to serve, and a desire to enter into the 'spirit of Lourdes'. Note that if you have specific restrictions which for example may not enable you to lift someone, this is not a problem, as there are plenty of other things to do; just make sure your "limitations?!" are known. (Some of the best hospitaliers are physically disabled in some way)

It is also not necessary to speak French, though a basic knowledge of that or any other language is of course useful. Any languages that a stagier feels confident about speaking can be indicated on their badge by flags. The first flag on the badge will generally match the nationality of the individual with other badges denoting languages spoken with some level of fluency. It is for this reason that while Irish, Americans, and many Canadians will use English as their first language, the first flag will be their national flag and thereafter, the language flags.

During the first four years, stagiaires must take part in the 'Formation' (a type of Stage training, formerly known as ‘école’ or school) twice in the week. This provides both practical training, and an overview of the spirituality of Lourdes. The Formation classes are taught in English, when an English speaking formateur is present (which is usually the case). There are no exams and plenty of opportunity for interaction and discussion. Usual topics for discussion include: our attitudes to the sick; the symbolism of the grotto and its water; a tour of the places where Bernadette lived; the history of the domain; Christian approaches to suffering; etc.

The first Stage is known as the 'année d’accueil’ (reception year). After this volunteers become a 'hospitalier auxiliaire’, for years 2, 3 and 4. After the reception year and three stages of formation Christians can apply in their 4th year to make an engagement into the Hospitalité. The following year (5th), after approval from the Council, volunteers are presented with the silver medal on blue ribbon. This is a sign that the volunteer has made a promise to commit to the service of the sick, specifically by coming on stage regularly. This medal is a dedication, not a decoration, and a sign that the volunteer is at the service of anyone who may visit Lourdes. This isn’t the end of the service, but the beginning of a deeper commitment.

Once a volunteer has become a ‘titulaire’ member of the HNDL, they are asked to pay an annual €15 ‘cotisation’ to help cover administrative costs and pay for the Lettre de l’Hospitalité which members receive three times a year. New member in Great Britain may also become a member of the British Hospitality Trust and be invited to an annual reunion in the winter. The "cotisation" in Britain may be paid to the British Hospitality Trust, which is a charity, so any tax may be reclaimed. The money gained is used to pay for things of use to the Hospitalite at Lourdes.

Many pilgrimages from across the world have their own stage groups. In Britain, for example the Catholic Association Pilgrimage who run two groups in May and August, Ampleforth, whose Stage group give service in June, Hexham, which has a stage group in May, and SOLL, a stage group in September. There is also an Oxford and Cambridge stage group.

American hospitalite groups come over in ever increasing numbers with the North American Volunteers, or with the Sovereign Military Order of Malta.

Anyone who wishes to become a stagiaire as a step towards becoming a hospitalier needs only get a letter of introduction from his or her parish priest, or any hospitalier, and send it to HNDL Lourdes complete with a completed Request for Stage form (in French, demande de stage).

== See also ==
- Lourdes
- Catholic Association Pilgrimage
- Liverpool hospitalité
- Association of British Lourdes Pilgrimage Hospitalités
- Diocese of Shrewsbury Lourdes Hospitalité
