= Lourdes =

Lourdes Lorda (Occitan)
- Commune
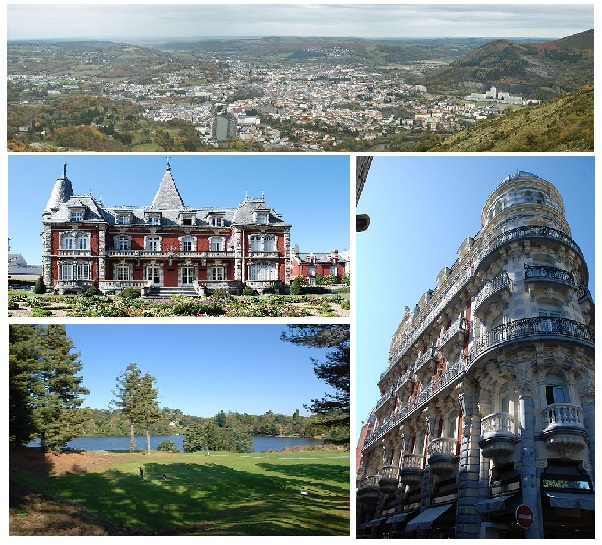
- Lourdes with the Sanctuary of Our Lady

- Coat of arms
- Location of Lourdes
- Location within France Location within Occitanie
- Coordinates: 43°5′39″N 0°2′49″W
- Country: France
- Region: Occitania
- Department: Hautes-Pyrénées
- Arrondissement: Argelès-Gazost
- Canton: Lourdes-1 and 2
- Intercommunality: CA Tarbes-Lourdes-Pyrénées

Government
  - Mayor (2020–2026): Thierry Lavit
- Area^{1}: 36.94 km^{2} (14.26 sq mi)
- Highest elevation: 960 m (3,150 ft)
- Lowest elevation: 343 m (1,125 ft)
- Population (2023): 13,266
  - Density: 359.1/km^{2} (930.1/sq mi)
- Demonym: Lourdais
- Time zone: UTC+01:00 (CET)
  - Summer (DST): UTC+02:00 (CEST)
- INSEE/Postal code: 65286 /65100
- Website: lourdes.fr
- ^{1} French Land Register data, which excludes lakes, ponds, glaciers > 1 km^{2} (0.386 sq mi or 247 acres) and river estuaries.

Lourdes (/lʊərd/, also US: /lʊərdz/, French: [luʁd]; Occitan: Lorda [ˈluɾðɔ]) is a market town situated in the Pyrenees. It is part of the Hautes-Pyrénées department in the Occitanie region in southwestern France. Prior to the mid-19th century, the town was best known for its Château fort, a fortified castle that rises up from a rocky escarpment at its center.

In 1858, Lourdes rose to prominence in France and abroad due to the Marian apparitions to the peasant girl Bernadette Soubirous (later canonized a saint by the Catholic Church for her virtuous life). Shortly thereafter, the city and its Sanctuary of Our Lady of Lourdes became among the world's most important sites for pilgrimage and religious tourism.

== History ==
=== Antiquity ===
The current municipal area of Lourdes was inhabited in prehistoric times. In Ancient Roman times, from the first century BC, it was an oppidum hill on the site of the present-day fortress, as shown by the numerous archaeological finds after the demolition of the parish of Saint-Pierre in the early twentieth century. Remains of walls, fragments of a citadel, a pagan temple dedicated to the gods of water, and three votive altars were uncovered. In the fifth century, the temple was replaced by an early Christian church, which later burned down, with a necropolis nearby. A Roman road along with a possible crossing path connecting the Pyrenean piedmont with Narbonne suggest that the town could be the quell'oppidum novum fortress mentioned in the Antonine Itinerary.

From 732 to 778, Lourdes was occupied by Muslims of Al-Andalus. Mirat, the Muslim local leader, came under siege by Charlemagne, King of the Franks, but the Moor refused to surrender. According to legend, a passing eagle dropped a huge trout at Mirat's feet. Dismayed by this omen, Mirat was urged to surrender to the Queen of Heaven by the local bishop. He visited the Black Virgin of Puy, and was so astounded by the icon's exceptional beauty that he decided to surrender the fort and convert to Christianity. He was baptised with the name Lorus, which was given to the town as Lourdes.

=== Middle Ages ===
Little is known of Lourdes in the period from the barbarian invasions to the Carolingian period when the town was part of the County of Bigorre. The fortress was at times the seat of counts and, during the Albigensian Crusade, it was the subject of disputes between various local lords. Ultimately it came under the domination of the Counts of Champagne. In the fourteenth century Lourdes was first occupied by Philip the Fair, then, during the Hundred Years' War, by the English, who controlled it for nearly half a century, from 1360 to 1407, through local feudal lords such as Pierre Arnaud de Béarn and, later, his brother Jean de Béarn.

The English were able to take advantage of the excellent strategic situation and the prosperity of an eleventh-century market that had been increasingly consolidated thanks to its proximity and good communications with Toulouse and Spain, managing to secure important gains for those who held the town. In the town, which developed in the valley, east of the fort, there were 243 fires at the beginning of the fifteenth century, compared to 150 of the thirteenth century.

After being the residency of the Bigorre counts, Lourdes was given to England by the Treaty of Brétigny which bought a temporary peace to France during the course of the Hundred Years War, with the French losing the town to the English in 1360. In 1405, Charles VI laid siege to the castle during the course of the war and eventually captured the town from the English after an 18-month siege.

=== Modern Age ===
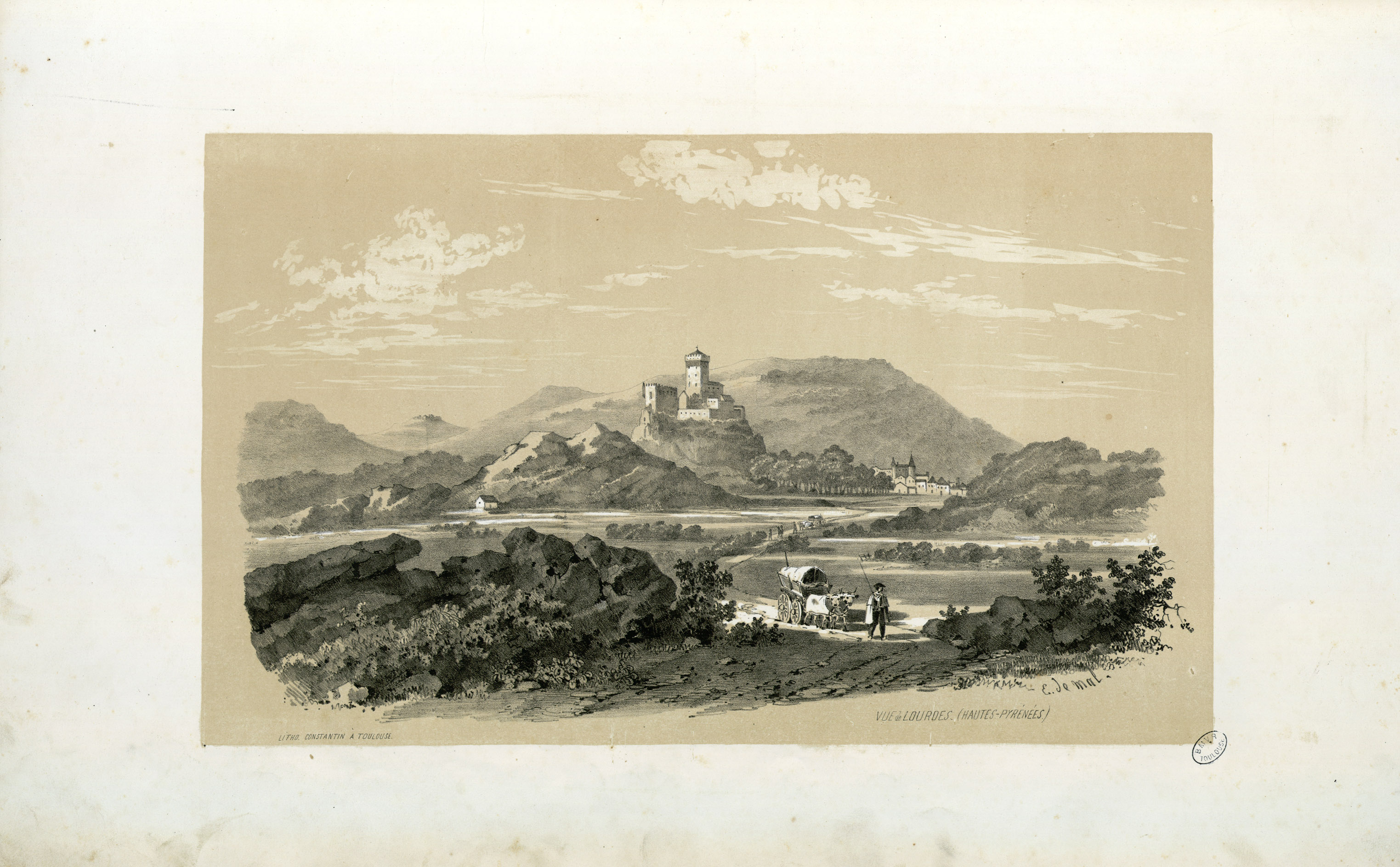
Waggon pulled by two oxen in front of Château fort de Lourdes in 1843, by Eugène de Malbos

During the late 16th century, France was ravaged by the Wars of Religion between Roman Catholics and Huguenots. In 1569, Count Gabriel de Montgomery attacked the nearby town of Tarbes when Queen Jeanne d'Albret of Navarre established Protestantism there. In 1592, the town was taken by forces of the Catholic League, and the Catholic faith was re-established. In 1607, Lourdes was incorporated into the Kingdom of France.

The castle became a jail under Louis XV but, in 1789, the Estates General ordered the liberation of prisoners. Following the rise of Napoleon in 1803, he again made the Castle a state jail. Towards the end of the Peninsular War between France, Spain, Portugal, and Britain in 1814, British and Allied forces under the Duke of Wellington entered France and took control of the region. They pursued Marshall Soult's army, defeating the French near the adjoining town of Tarbes, before the final battle outside Toulouse on 10 April 1814 brought the war to an end.

Up until 1858, Lourdes was a sleepy country town with a population of around 4,000 hosting an infantry garrison in the castle, a transit point to the waters at Barèges, Cauterets, Luz-Saint-Sauveur and Bagnères-de-Bigorre, and for mountaineers on their way to Gavarnie.

Then on 11 February 1858, the 14-year-old local girl Bernadette Soubirous claimed a beautiful lady appeared to her in the remote grotto of Massabielle. The lady later identified herself as the Immaculate Conception and the faithful believed her to be the Blessed Virgin Mary. She appeared 18 times, and by 1859 thousands of pilgrims were visiting Lourdes. A statue of Our Lady of Lourdes was erected at the site in 1864.

During World War II, pilgrimage to Lourdes declined dramatically, but Lourdes became a focus for religious resistance. Refugees from Lorraine visited in 1941, led by their own exiled bishop Joseph Jean Heintz. Lourdes was the destination for a tour of the statue of Our Lady of Boulogne (known as Le Grand Retour) which aimed to secure the spiritual salvation of France. In 1944, a peace pilgrimage to Lourdes took place. Even when war ended, pilgrimages took a while to return to their pre-war levels as the usual trains and pilgrimage ships were in use elsewhere, or destroyed.

Since the apparitions, Lourdes has become one of the world's leading Catholic Marian shrines. Pope John Paul II visited twice, on 15 August 1983, and 14–15 August 2004. In 2007, Pope Benedict XVI authorized special indulgences to mark the 150th anniversary of Our Lady of Lourdes.

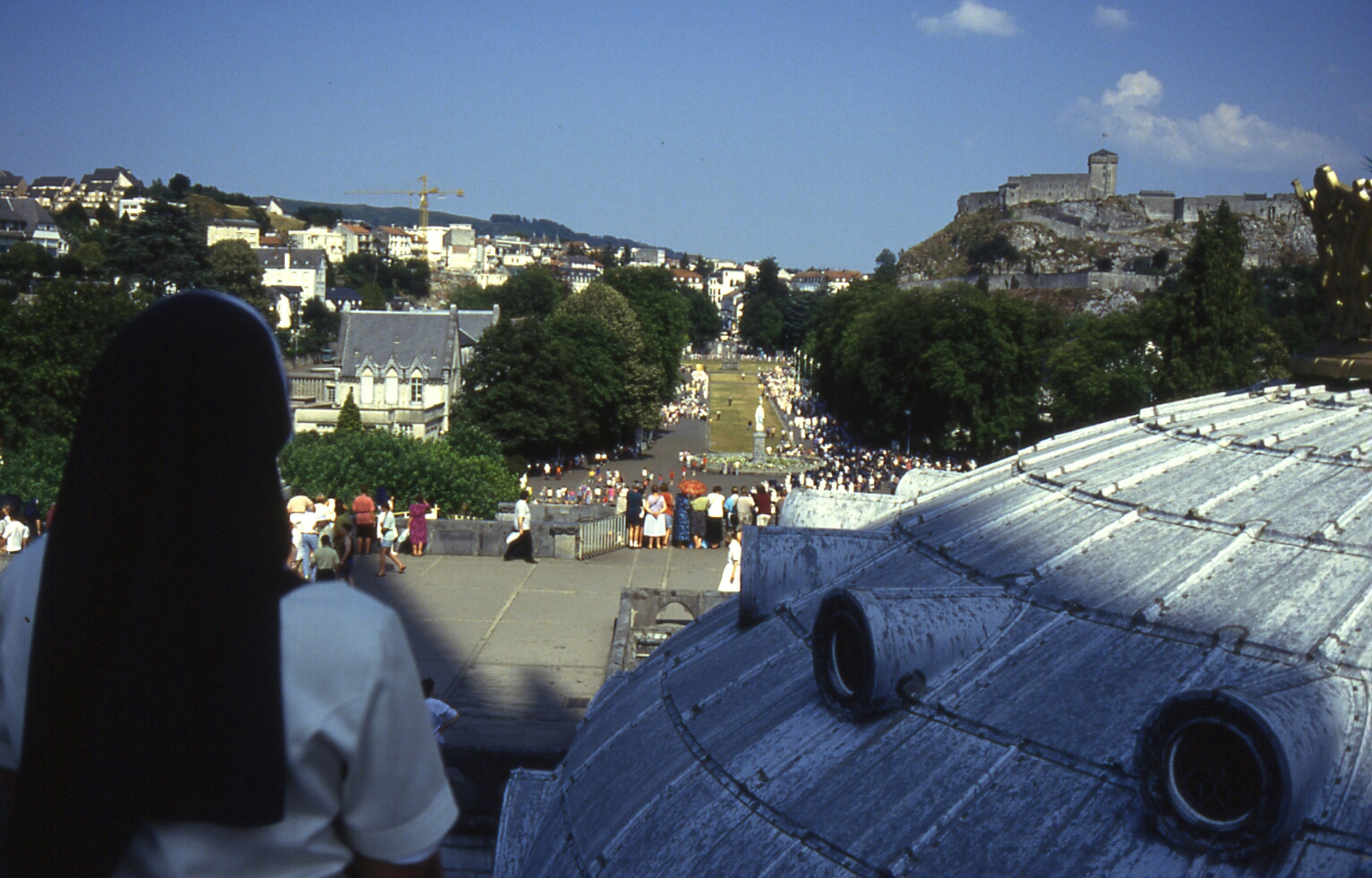
Lourdes 1994

== Geography ==
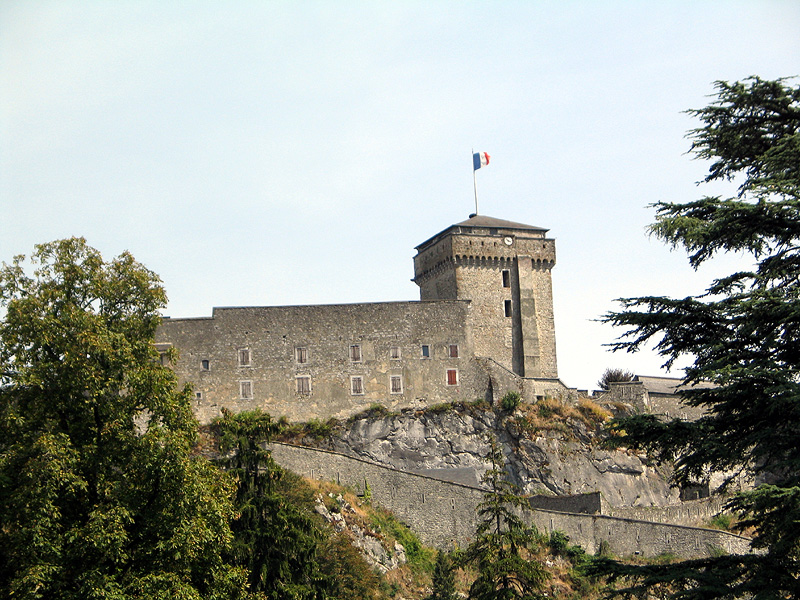
The Château Fort in Lourdes

Lourdes is located in southern France in the foothills of the Pyrenees mountains near the prime meridian. It is overlooked from the south by the Pyrenean peaks of Aneto, Montaigu, and Vignemale (3,298 m or 10,820 ft), while around the town there are three summits reaching up to 1,000 m (3,281 ft) which are known as the Béout, the Petit Jer (with its three crosses) and the Grand Jer (with its single cross). The Grand Jer is accessible via the funicular railway of the Pic du Jer. The Béout was once accessible by cable car, although this has fallen into disrepair. A pavilion is still visible on the summit.

Lourdes lies at an elevation of 420 m (1,380 ft) and in a central position through which runs the fast-flowing river Gave de Pau from the south, coming from its source at Gavarnie; into it flow several smaller rivers from Barèges and Cauterets. The Gave then branches off to the west towards the Béarn, running past the banks of the Grotto and on downstream to Pau and then Biarritz.

On land bordered by a loop of the Gave de Pau is an outcrop of rock called Massabielle (from masse vieille: "old mass"). On the northern aspect of this rock, near the riverbank, is a naturally occurring, irregularly shaped shallow cave or grotto, in which the apparitions of 1858 took place.

=== Climate ===
The climate of Lourdes, due to the proximity of the city to the Atlantic, is oceanic (Cfb in the Köppen climate classification). It is quite mild for most of the year with moderate rainfall in summer and quite high rainfall in winter – about 120 rainy days and more than 1,000 mm (39 in) of average annual precipitation. The summers are warm, the autumn and spring mild, while winter is cool. Because of the proximity of the city to the Pyrenees, Lourdes, like other areas of the Pyrenean Piedmont, however, can be affected in winter by sporadic waves of frost: in January 1985 the thermometer marked -17° Fahrenheit, -27 °C (historical record from 1934 to the present). A summer temperature of 102 °F, 39 °C, was recorded in August 2003. The reference station of Lourdes is to Tarbes-Ossun-Lourdes, located approximately 9 km (5.6 mi) from the town, in the airport area of Tarbes-Lourdes-Pyrénées, 360 m.

Stat. of Tarbes (1982–2013)	Jan	Feb	Mar	Apr	May	Jun	Jul	Aug	Sep	Oct	Nov	Dec	Year
Tp. min. avg (°C)	1,0	1,5	3,6	5,7	9,6	12,9	15,0	15,0	12,0	8,7	4,4	1,8	7,7
Tp. avg (°C)	5,7	6,4	8,9	10,8	14,6	17,9	20,1	20,2	17,5	14,0	9,1	6,5	12,7
Tp. max. avg (°C)	10,3	11,2	14,2	15,9	19,6	22,8	25,2	25,3	22,9	19,2	13,7	11,1	17,7
Frost days	10,88	9,69	4,78	1,06	0	0	0	0	0	0,31	4,1	9,74	40,34
Precipitation (mm)	95.3	83.0	85.3	110.7	114.2	78.4	57.7	66.0	72.3	84.3	103.5	92.0	1041.8
Rainy days	10,59	9,5	10,16	12,53	12,91	9,75	7,19	8,47	8,53	10,28	10,16	10,29	120,35

Climate data for Lourdes (1981−2010 normals, extremes 1881−2011)
Month	Jan	Feb	Mar	Apr	May	Jun	Jul	Aug	Sep	Oct	Nov	Dec	Year
Record high °C (°F)	24.7 (76.5)	27.0 (80.6)	30.0 (86.0)	32.0 (89.6)	34.6 (94.3)	41.0 (105.8)	39.9 (103.8)	40.5 (104.9)	37.0 (98.6)	34.0 (93.2)	28.0 (82.4)	26.0 (78.8)	41.0 (105.8)
Mean daily maximum °C (°F)	11.0 (51.8)	12.3 (54.1)	15.4 (59.7)	17.1 (62.8)	20.7 (69.3)	23.8 (74.8)	26.1 (79.0)	26.3 (79.3)	23.7 (74.7)	19.8 (67.6)	14.4 (57.9)	11.6 (52.9)	18.5 (65.3)
Daily mean °C (°F)	6.3 (43.3)	7.3 (45.1)	10.0 (50.0)	11.7 (53.1)	15.3 (59.5)	18.4 (65.1)	20.6 (69.1)	20.7 (69.3)	18.0 (64.4)	14.6 (58.3)	9.6 (49.3)	7.0 (44.6)	13.3 (55.9)
Mean daily minimum °C (°F)	1.5 (34.7)	2.3 (36.1)	4.5 (40.1)	6.3 (43.3)	9.9 (49.8)	13.1 (55.6)	15.1 (59.2)	15.2 (59.4)	12.4 (54.3)	9.4 (48.9)	4.8 (40.6)	2.3 (36.1)	8.1 (46.6)
Record low °C (°F)	−18.2 (−0.8)	−16.5 (2.3)	−12.0 (10.4)	−4.9 (23.2)	−3.8 (25.2)	1.0 (33.8)	0.5 (32.9)	1.5 (34.7)	−0.1 (31.8)	−4.0 (24.8)	−9.9 (14.2)	−17.0 (1.4)	−18.2 (−0.8)
Average precipitation mm (inches)	135.1 (5.32)	109.5 (4.31)	120.7 (4.75)	149.9 (5.90)	139.6 (5.50)	103.9 (4.09)	82.5 (3.25)	87.1 (3.43)	94.9 (3.74)	121.9 (4.80)	145.5 (5.73)	136.1 (5.36)	1,426.7 (56.17)
Average precipitation days (≥ 1.0 mm)	12.4	11.6	12.0	14.3	15.0	11.9	10.8	10.7	10.3	12.3	12.4	12.2	146.1
Source: Météo-France

== Apparitions and pilgrimages ==
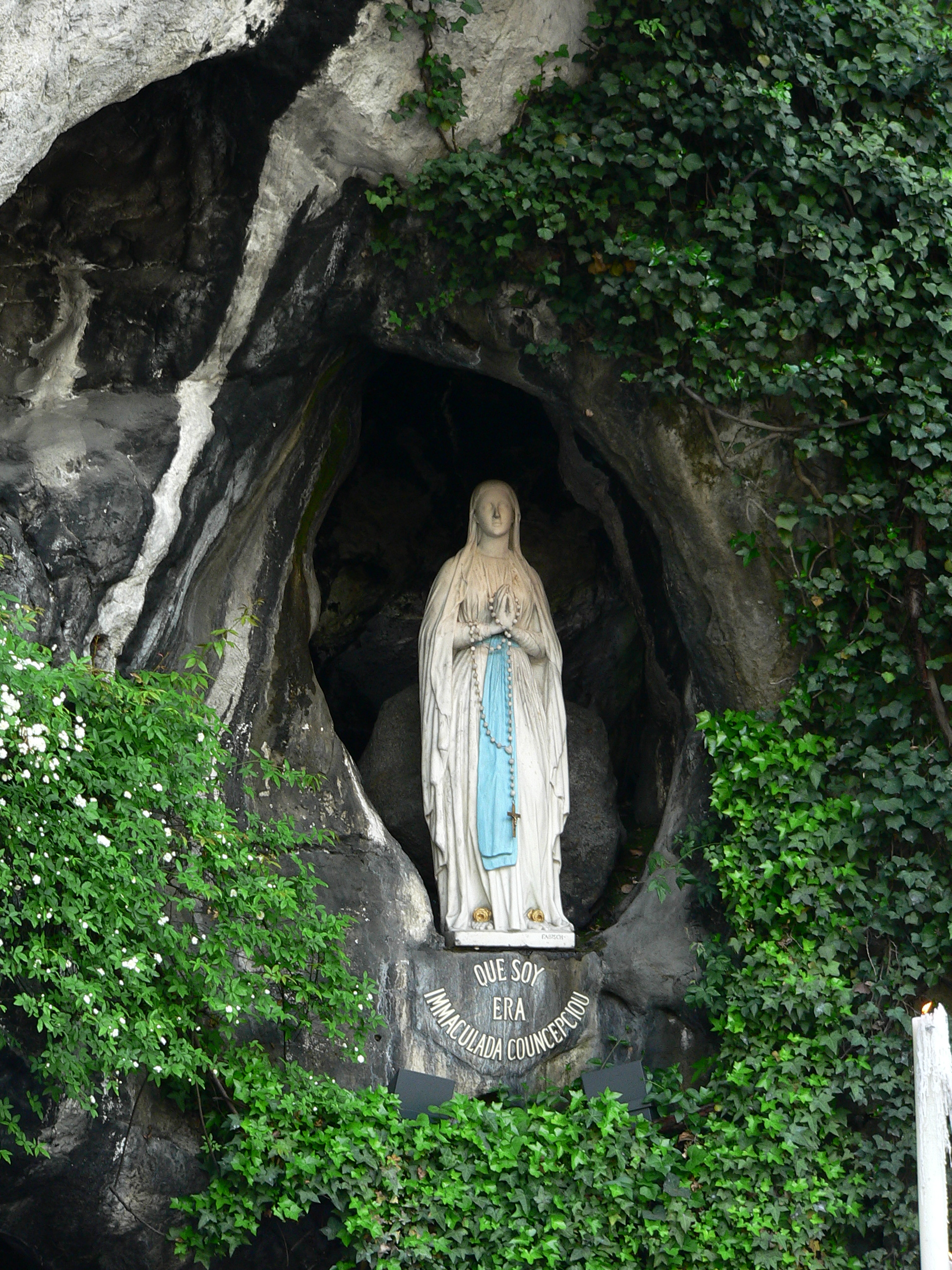
Statue of Our Lady of Lourdes in the Grotto

In 1858, the Virgin Mary allegedly appeared to Bernadette Soubirous (Maria Bernada Sobirós in her native Occitan language) on a total of eighteen occasions at Lourdes (Lorda in her local Occitan language). Lourdes has become a major place of Roman Catholic pilgrimage and of miraculous healings. The 150th Jubilee of the first apparition took place on 11 February 2008 with an outdoor Mass attended by approximately 45,000 pilgrims.

In 2020, Lourdes had a population of around 15,000. In 2012, 715,000 pilgrims attended Our Lady of Lourdes-related events, falling to 570,000 in 2016. In 2011, Lourdes contained about 270 hotels, the second-greatest number of hotels per square kilometer in France after Paris. Its deluxe hotels include Grand Hotel Moderne, Hotel Grand de la Grotte, Hotel St. Étienne, Hotel Majestic, and Hotel Roissy.

=== Marian apparitions ===
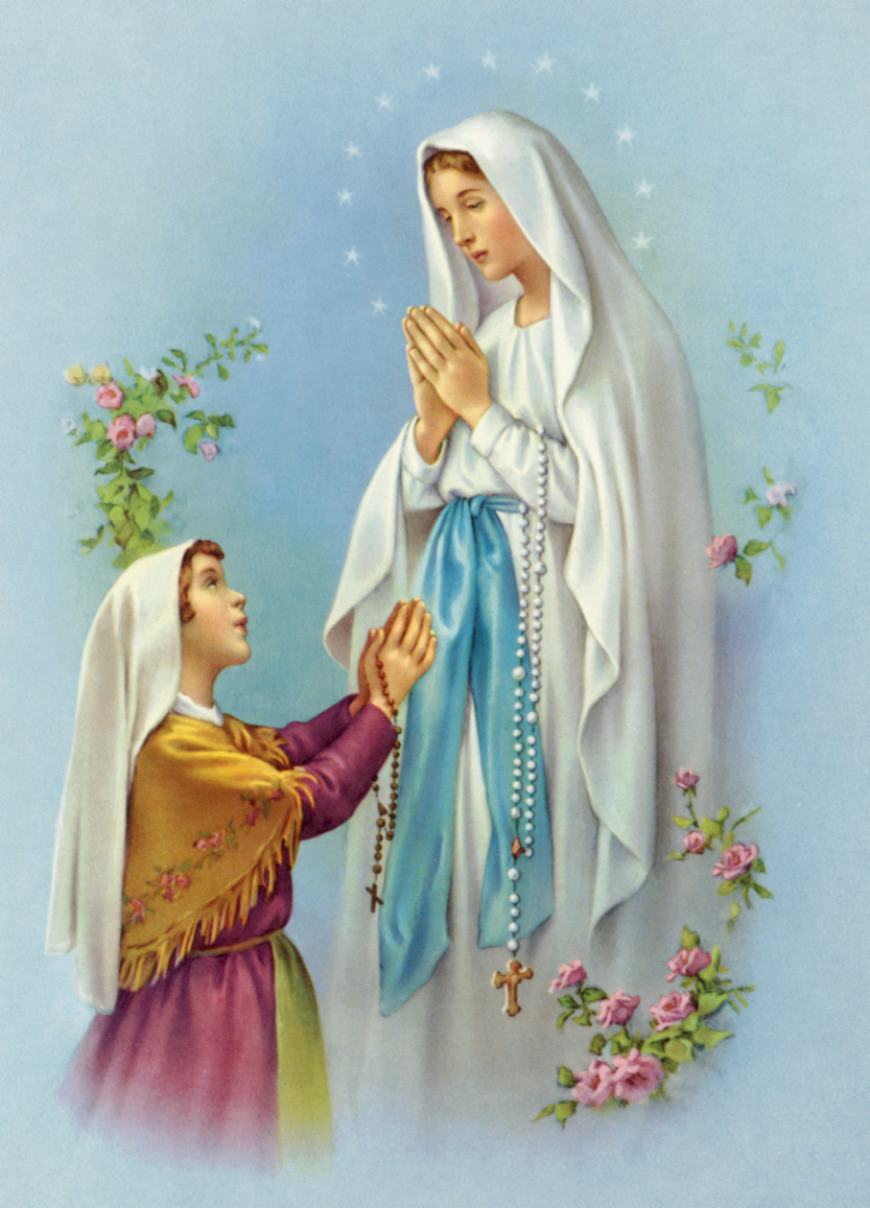
Old religious card with the apparition of the Virgin Mary in Lourdes, France

On the evening of February 11, 1858, a young Roman Catholic girl, Bernadette Soubirous, reported that she went to fetch some firewood with her sister and another companion when a lady who was indescribably beautiful appeared to her at the Massabielle grotto. Although the lady did not tell Bernadette her name when asked at first, she told her to return to the grotto. On subsequent visits, the lady revealed herself to be the "Immaculate Conception". This was a reference to the dogma of the Immaculate Conception which had been defined only four years earlier in 1854 by Pope Pius IX, stating that the Virgin Mary herself had been conceived free from the consequences of original sin. Bernadette, having only a rudimentary knowledge of the Catholic faith, did not understand what this meant, but she reported it to her parish priest, Father Peyremale. Peyremale, though initially very skeptical of Bernadette's claims, became convinced by hearing this because he knew that the young girl had no knowledge of the doctrine.

The lady also told Bernadette to dig in the ground at a certain spot and to drink from the small spring of water that began to bubble up. Almost immediately, cures were reported from the water. Today thousands of gallons of water gush from the source of the spring, and pilgrims are able to bathe in it. Countless purported miracle cures have been documented there, from the healing of nervous disorders and cancers to cases of paralysis and even of blindness. During the apparitions, Bernadette Soubirous prayed the Rosary. Pope John Paul II wrote: "The Rosary of the Virgin Mary [is] a prayer of great significance, destined to bring forth a harvest of holiness".

=== Messages ===
The words spoken by Our Lady to Saint Bernadette include:

Feb 17, 1858 (Ash Wednesday)

It is not necessary [to write down my name]. Would you be kind enough to come here for 15 days? I do not promise to make you happy in this world, but in the next.

Feb 21, 1858

(Sorrowful tone of voice) Pray for sinners.

Feb 24, 1858

Penance! Penance! Penance! Pray to God for sinners.

Feb 25, 1858

Go, drink of the spring and wash yourself there. You will eat the grass that is there.

Feb 27, 1858

Penance! Penance! Penance! Pray to God for sinners. Go, kiss the ground for the conversion of sinners. Go and tell the priests to have a chapel built here.

Feb 28, 1858

Penance! Penance! Penance! Pray to God for sinners. Go, kiss the ground for the conversion of sinners.

March 2, 1858

Go, tell the priests to bring people here in procession and have a Chapel built here.

March 25, 1858

I am the Immaculate Conception.

== Religious sites ==
=== Sanctuary of Lourdes ===
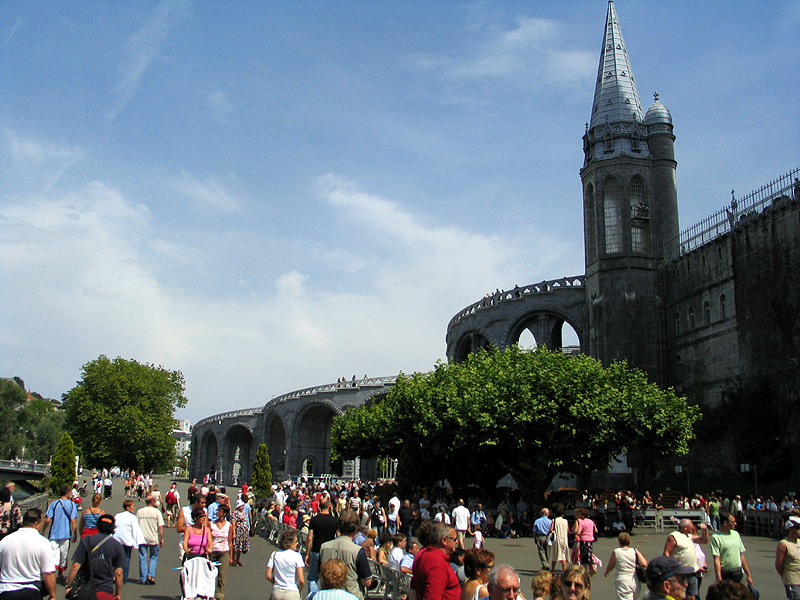
The majority of visitors are pilgrims who fill the public spaces of the Domain.

Yearly from March to October the Sanctuary of Our Lady of Lourdes is a place of mass pilgrimage from Europe and other parts of the world. The spring water from the grotto is believed by some Catholics to possess healing properties.

An estimated 200 million people have visited the shrine since 1860, and the Roman Catholic Church has officially recognized 72 healings considered miraculous, as of April 2025. Cures are examined using Church criteria for authenticity and authentic miracle healing with no physical or psychological basis other than the healing power of the water.

Tours from all over the world are organized to visit the Sanctuary. Connected with this pilgrimage is often the consumption of or bathing in the Lourdes water which wells out of the Grotto.

At the time of the apparitions, the grotto was on common land which was used by the villagers variously for pasturing animals and collecting firewood, and it possessed a reputation for being an unpleasant place.

=== Ukrainian Church ===
The five-domed St. Mary's Ukrainian Catholic Church in Lourdes was designed by Myroslav Nimciv, while its Byzantine interior polychrome decorations were executed by artist Jerzy Nowosielski and the iconostasis by Petro Kholodny. The church was consecrated in 1982. It is about a 10-minute walk from the basilica and the grotto, on a street named in honour of Ukraine, 8 Rue de l'Ukraine, situated on a narrow piece of property close to the railroad station. Visible from the basilica, the height of the building makes up for its narrow breadth.

== Population ==
Historical population
Year	Pop.	±% p.a.
1968	17,939	—
1975	17,870	−0.06%
1982	17,425	−0.36%
1990	16,300	−0.83%
1999	15,203	−0.77%
2007	15,254	+0.04%
2012	14,466	−1.06%
2017	13,389	−1.54%
2023	13,266	−0.15%
Source: INSEE

== International relations ==
Lourdes is twinned with:

- Basilica of Our Lady of Good Health in Vailankanni, Tamil Nadu, India
- Częstochowa in Poland
- Fátima in Portugal
- Loreto in Italy
- Altötting in Germany
- Cheyenne in Wyoming, United States
- Mariazell in Austria
- Bethlehem in Palestine

== Sport ==
Although most famous for its shrines, the town is also notable for its Rugby union team, FC Lourdes, which was one of the most successful teams in France during the mid-twentieth century, winning the national championship eight times from 1948 to 1968. Their most famous player was Jean Prat, who represented his country 51 times.

There is also an amateur association football team in the town.

Since 2015, the local mountain biking course has been home to a UCI Downhill World Cup round each season.

== In arts and fiction ==
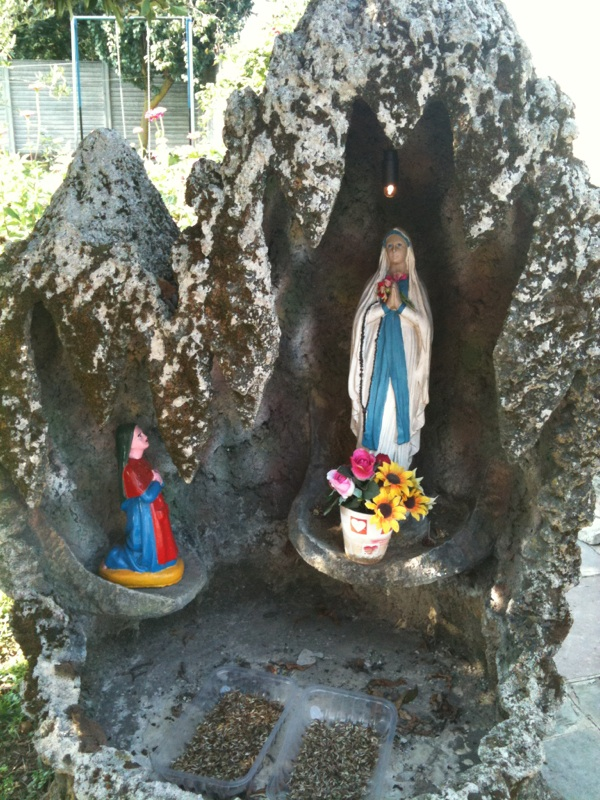
The apparition at Lourdes, represented in a cave

- Émile Zola (1840–1902) wrote the 1884 novel Lourdes that deals with faith and healing, particularly of Marie de Guersaint.
- The 1943 film Song of Bernadette, based on the 1941 novel by Franz Werfel which tells of the occurrences at Lourdes, won four Academy Awards in 1944. Producer William Perlberg carefully re-created the appearance of the town and outlying rural areas using a golf course.
- In 1960, Andy Williams released his album The Village of St. Bernadette, which featured the 1959 song "The Village of St. Bernadette".
- The film Behold a Pale Horse (1963), directed by Fred Zinnemann and starring Gregory Peck, Anthony Quinn, and Omar Sharif, includes a scene in Lourdes that is crucial to the plot. The scene was shot on location and includes actual pilgrims visiting the basilica.
- The 1984 book The Miracle by Irving Wallace is speculative fiction based on the story of Saint Bernadette.
- The 2007 film The Diving Bell and the Butterfly features a flashback in which Jean-Dominique Bauby travels to Lourdes with a girlfriend and walks through the streets of the town.
- The 2019 César Award-nominated documentary film Lourdes directed by Thierry Demaizière and Alban Teurlai provides an intimate portrait of different individuals and families in their struggles and journey to the Lourdes site.
- The 2023 film The Miracle Club is about a pilgrimage from Dublin to Lourdes.

== Transport ==
Lourdes is served by Tarbes-Lourdes-Pyrénées Airport situated 10 kilometres (6.2 mi) from the town centre. (Many visitors also fly to Pau Pyrénées Airport.) The town's railway station Gare de Lourdes is served by SNCF and TGV trains, including a high-speed TGV service from Paris which takes four-and-a-half hours. Many pilgrims also arrive via bus service from France and Spain.

== Education ==
Lourdes has two main schools, one public and one private. The private school, the "Lycée Peyramale St Joseph", was founded by two monks just two years before the apparitions; it is named after the priest Dominique Peyramale, who was present during the apparitions. It celebrated its 150th anniversary in 2007. The newer public school is called the "Lycée de Sarsan".

== Museums ==
- Wax Museum of Lourdes
- Pyrenean Museum
- Museum of the Nativity
- Museum of small Lourdes

== See also ==
- Château fort de Lourdes
- Communes of the Hautes-Pyrénées department
- Hospitalité Notre Dame de Lourdes
- Lourdes apparitions
- Lourdes effect
- Shrines to the Virgin Mary
- "The Village of Saint Bernadette" (1959 song)
- Rosary

== Bibliography ==
- Collectif, Lourdes de la Préhistoire à nos jours, Musée Pyrénéen, 1987.
- Laurence Catinot-Crost, Autrefois Lourdes, Éditions Atlantica, 2005.
- Sébastien Barrère, Petite histoire de Lourdes, Cairn, 2014.
