= Our Lady of Lourdes Grotto Shrine, San Jose del Monte =

Roman Catholic church in Bulacan, Philippines

Our Lady of Lourdes Grotto Shrine
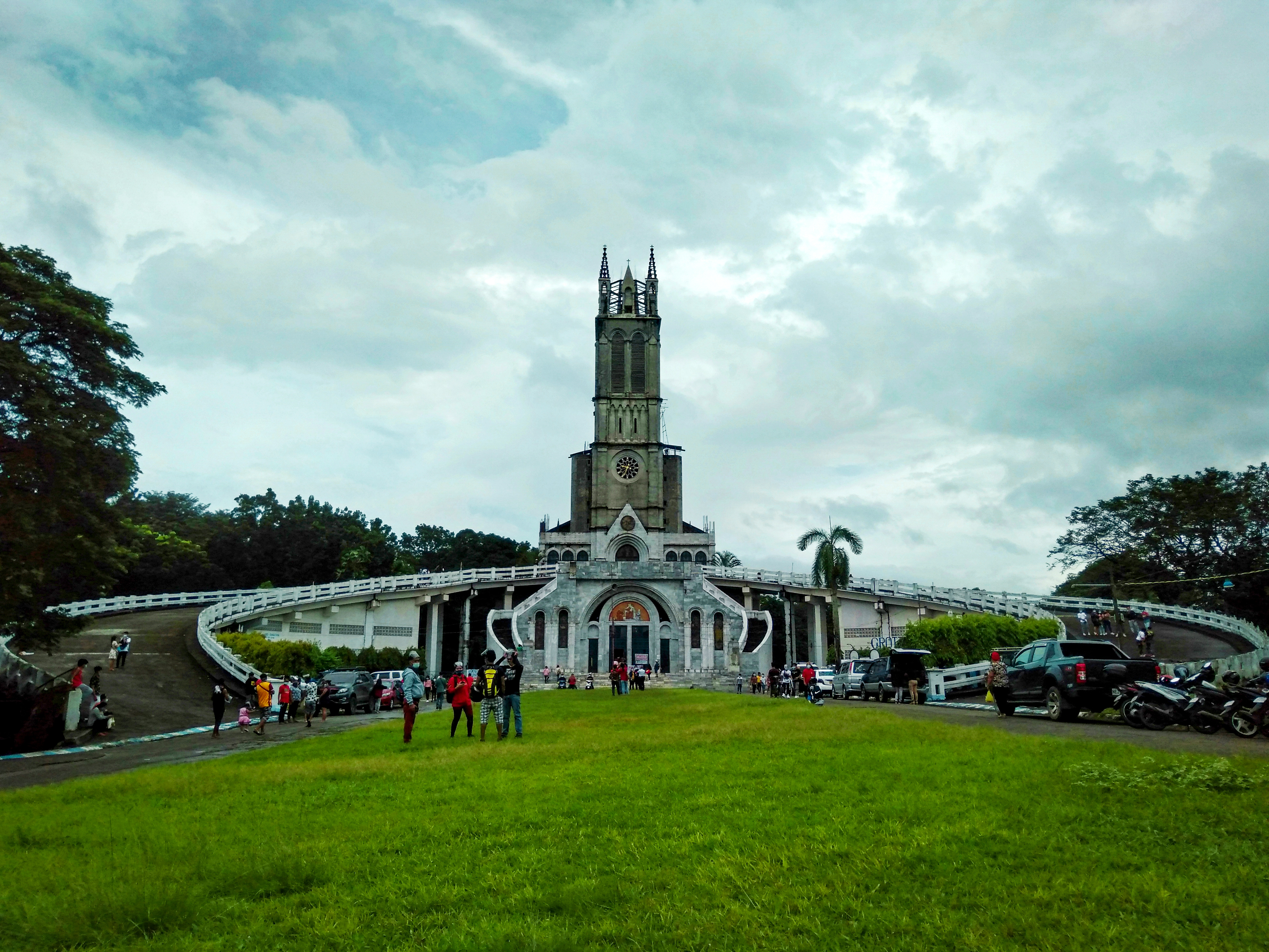
- The grotto shrine's church, pictured here in 2020, is a replica of the Rosary Basilica of France.

- Location in Bulacan Location in Luzon Location in the Philippines
- 14°47′37″N 121°04′00″E
- Location: San Jose del Monte, Bulacan
- Country: Philippines
- Denomination: Roman Catholic

History
- Founded: February 11, 1965; 61 years ago
- Founder(s): Horacio A. Guanzon; Anita Guidote-Guanzon
- Dedication: Our Lady of Lourdes
- Consecrated: July 20, 2024; 23 months ago

Architecture
- Functional status: Active

Administration
- Province: Manila
- Metropolis: Manila
- Archdiocese: Manila
- Diocese: Malolos
- Deanery: St. Joseph
- Parish: Saint Peter the Apostle

Our Lady of Lourdes Grotto Shrine is a Roman Catholic pilgrimage site in San Jose del Monte, Bulacan, Philippines. The shrine was established on February 11, 1965, by Horacio Guanzon and Anita Guidote-Guanzon, whose family had it donated to the Diocese of Malolos on July 20, 2024.

== History ==
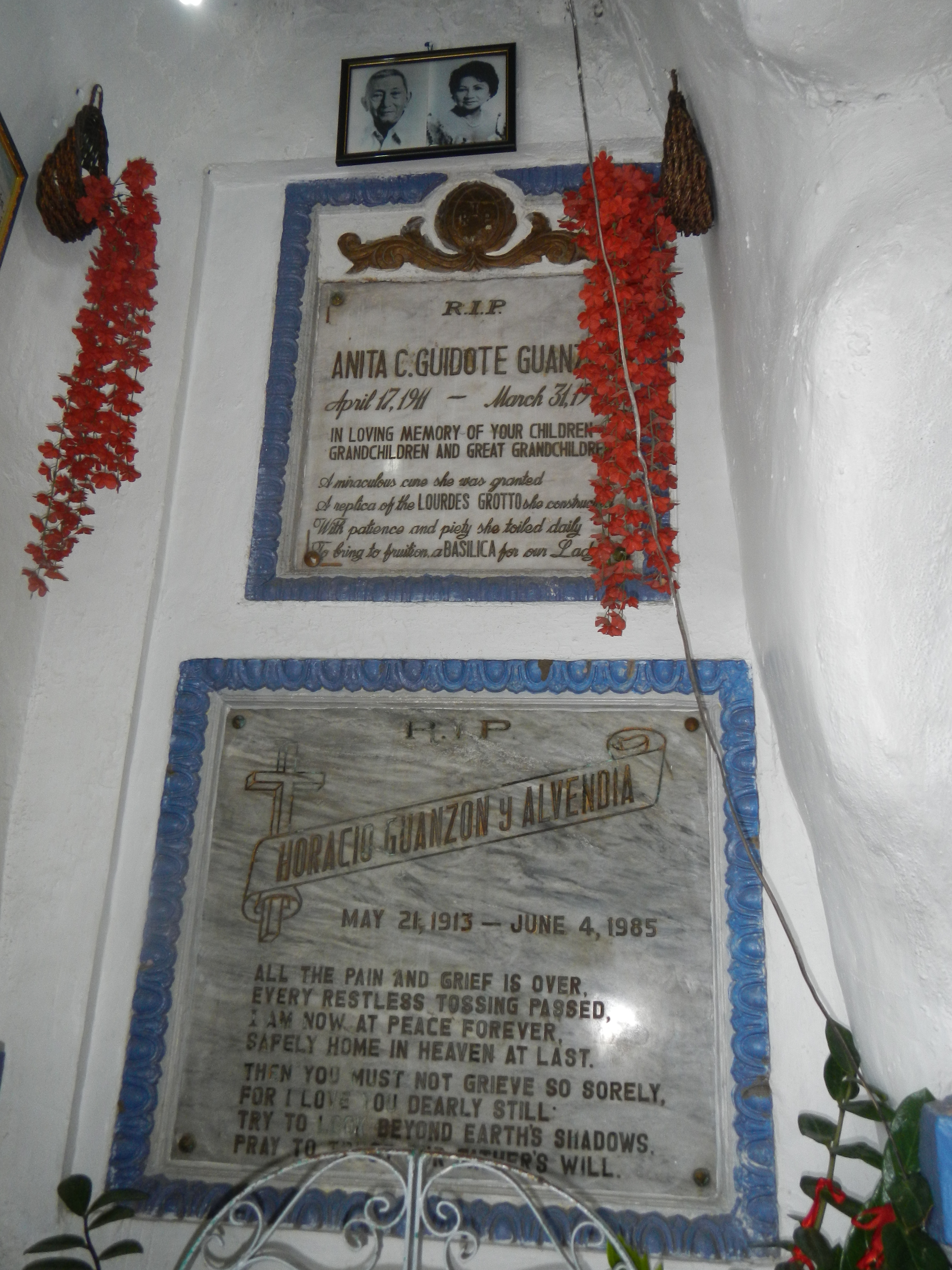
Ledger stones of Horacio and Anita Guanzon

The Our Lady of Lourdes Grotto Shrine was first opened to the public on February 11, 1965, coinciding with the Feast of Our Lady of Lourdes. The site was established by Horacio A. Guanzon and Anita Guidote-Guanzon, whose familial roots traces to wealthy families in Bulacan, Pampanga and Nueva Ecija. Guidote-Guanzon, after being cured of cancer following her family's pilgrimage to Lourdes, France, in 1961, decided to establish the grotto shrine as an act of thanksgiving, believing that the improvement of her condition was a miracle. The doctors who diagnosed her cancer projected that she only had six months to live but she went on to live for three more decades.

The Guanzons started a project to build a replica of the Rosary Basilica in Lourdes, France. After the death of Anita Guidote-Guanzon in 1990, the management of the grotto shrine was entrusted to their children, who oversaw the completion of the replica.

The eldest daughter of the Guanzons, Marietta Guanzon-Holmgren, asked the Diocese of Malolos in 2004 to send personnel to supervise religious rites at the grotto shrine. However, allegations arose that Guanzon-Holmgren was meddling too much on how clergymen sent by the diocese performed their duties. In a circular released on March 22, 2004, the shrine was said to be not compliant on Roman Catholic guidelines on liturgy and worship leading to Bishop Jose Oliveros, then Apostolic Administrator of Malolos, to stop recognizing the shrine as a Roman Catholic institution.

On June 12, 2024, the Guanzon family and the Diocese of Malolos finally agreed to address the status of the Shrine. The Guanzons formally donated the Shrine to the Diocese of Malolos. The Canonical Possession and Transfer of the Shrine to the diocese was finalized on July 20, 2024, in a ceremony officiated by bishop Dennis Villarojo.

== Status ==
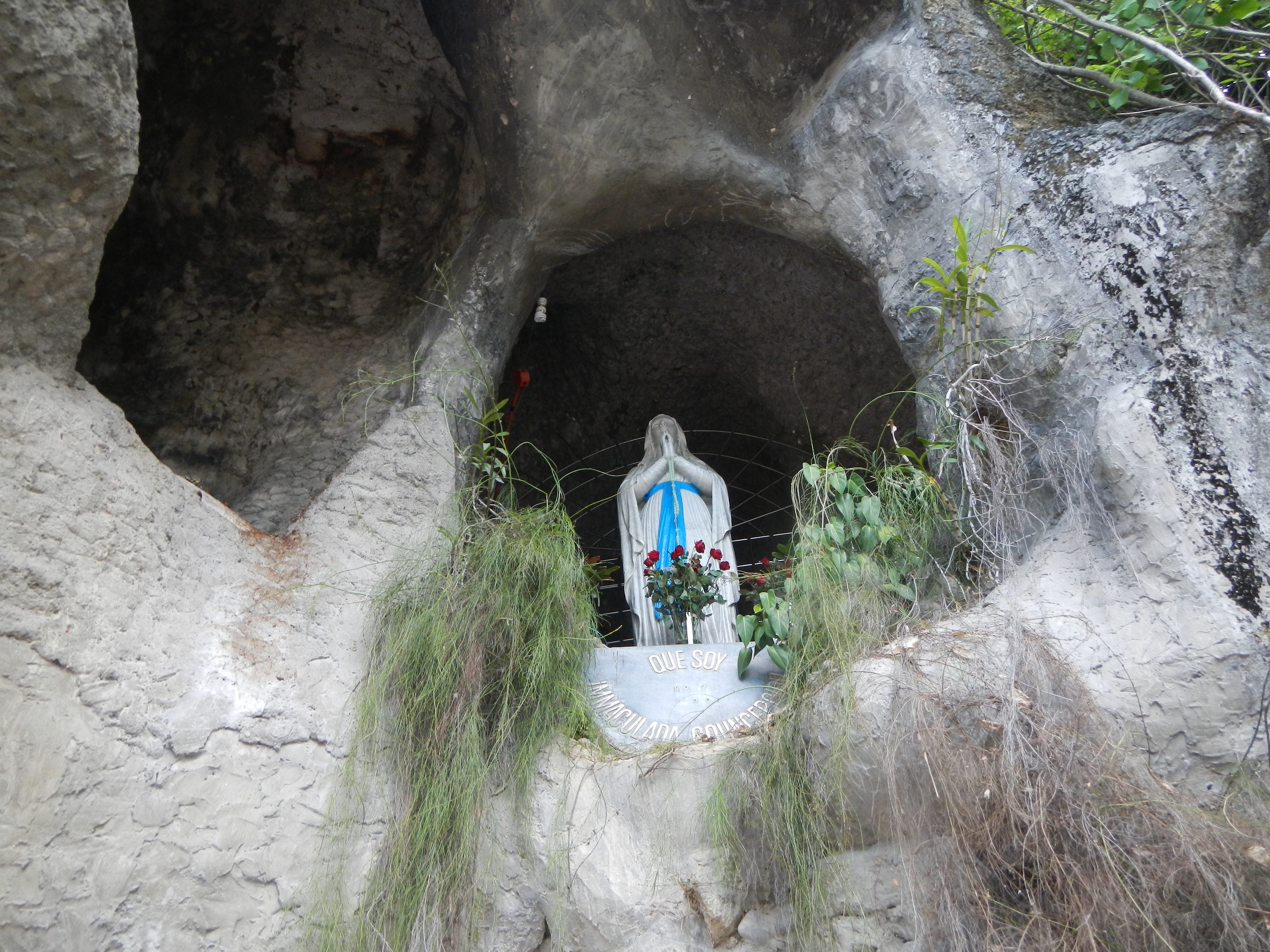
The Grotto behind the shrine's church in 2015

Because of the dispute, the Our Lady of Lourdes Grotto Shrine was not officially recognized as a Roman Catholic pilgrimage site by the Diocese of Malolos from 2004 to 2024. In 2019, the diocese reiterated its non-recognition of the shrine and said in a statement that priests holding rites at the site are suspended by the Roman Catholic church.

The shrine was ultimately recognized again as a Roman Catholic pilgrimage site after the Guanzon family had it donated and formally transferred to the diocese on July 20, 2024.

== Traditions ==
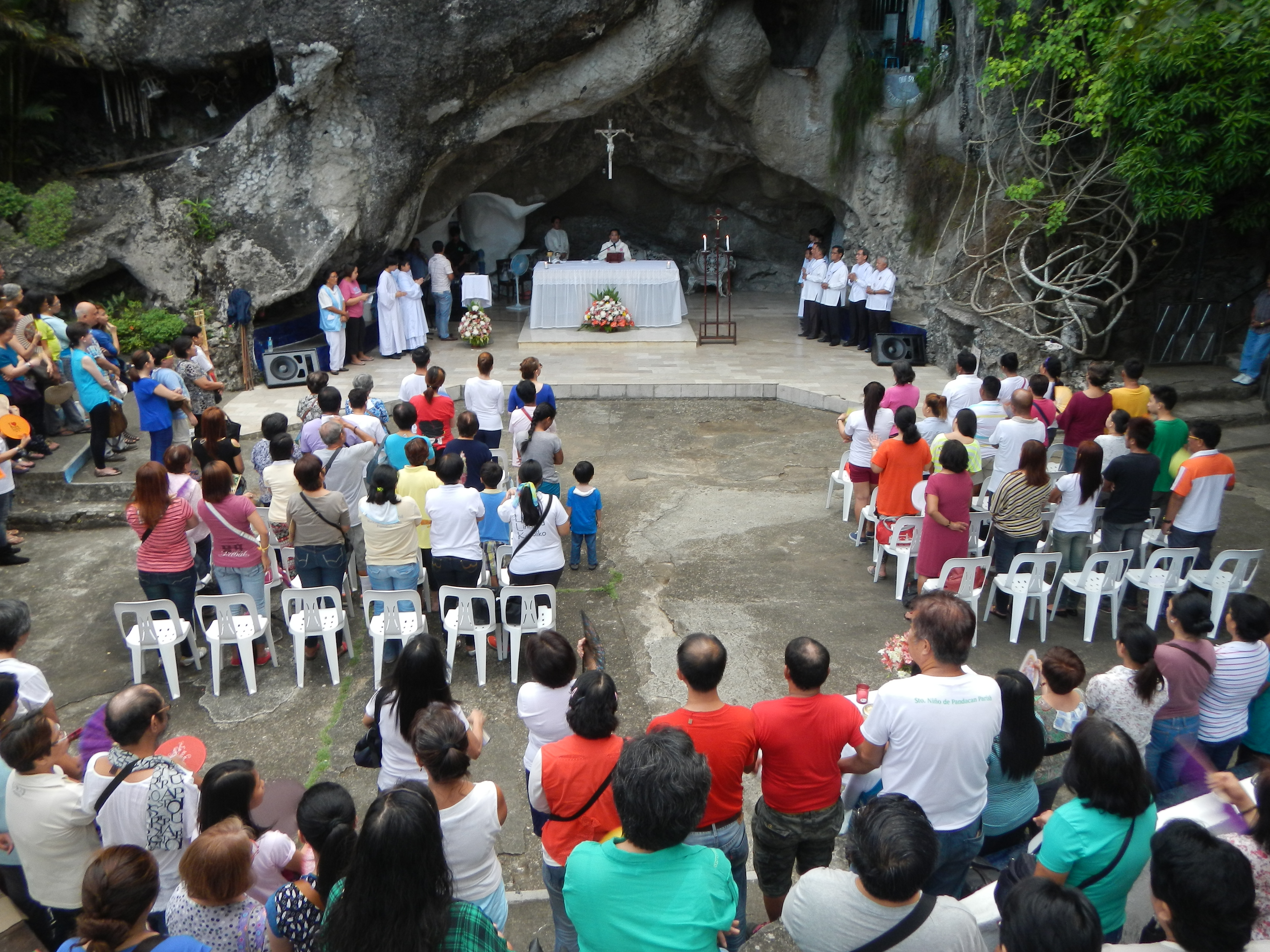
Mass held at the site's Grotto

The Our Lady of Lourdes Grotto Shrine is often visited by Roman Catholics during the Lenten season. Every Maundy Thursday since 1966, devotees conduct a penitential walk, traversing by foot from northern Metro Manila (either Malinta, Valenzuela or Balintawak, Quezon City) to the grotto shrine. Devotees largely come from the northern Metro Manila cities of Caloocan, Malabon, and Navotas; Novaliches, Quezon City and Valenzuela; and the Bulacan city of Meycauayan. Non-Catholic Christians, including Philippine Independent Church members also use the grotto shrine as a pilgrimage site.

== Gallery ==
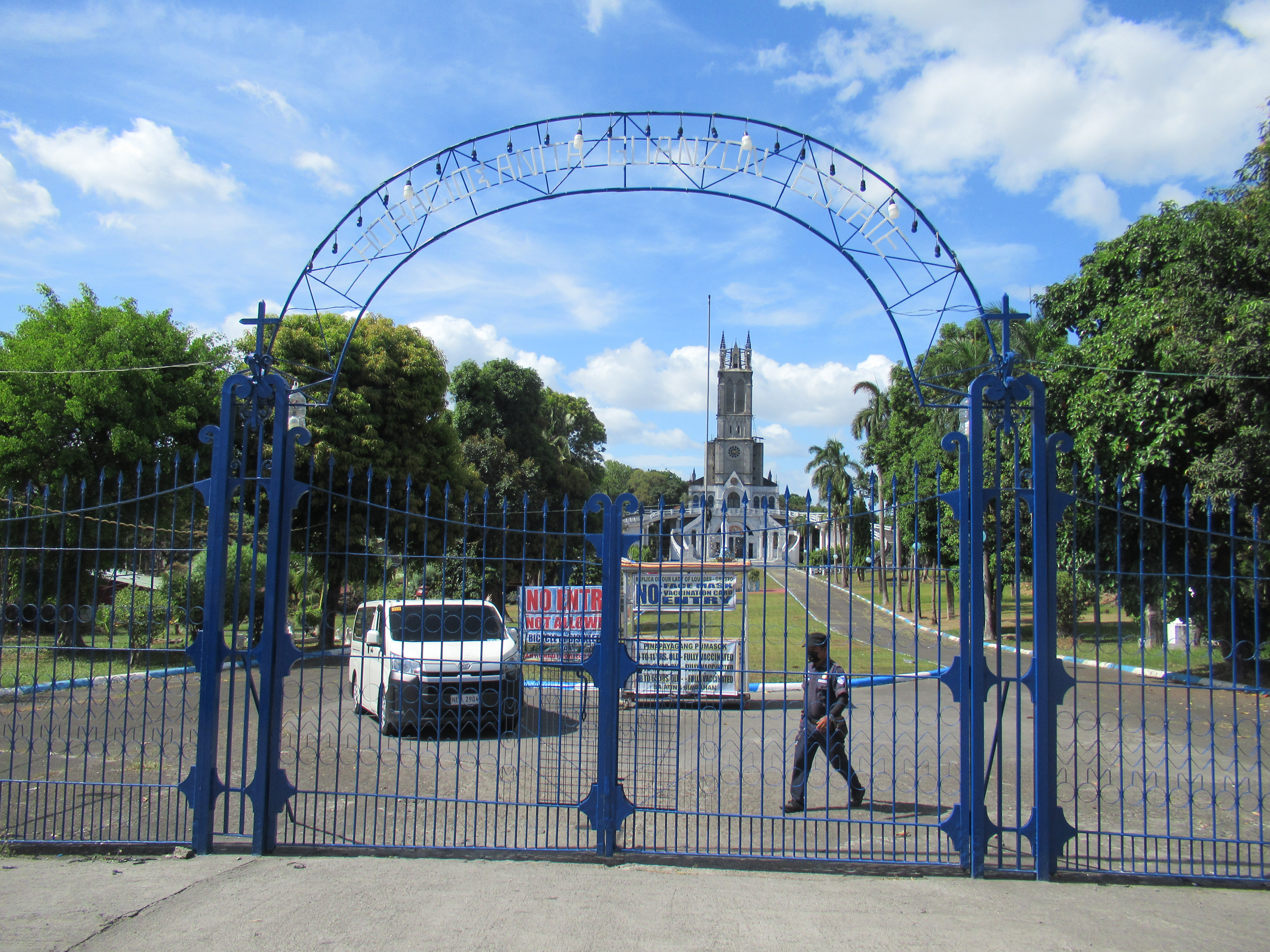
Main gate to the shrine complex in 2022.

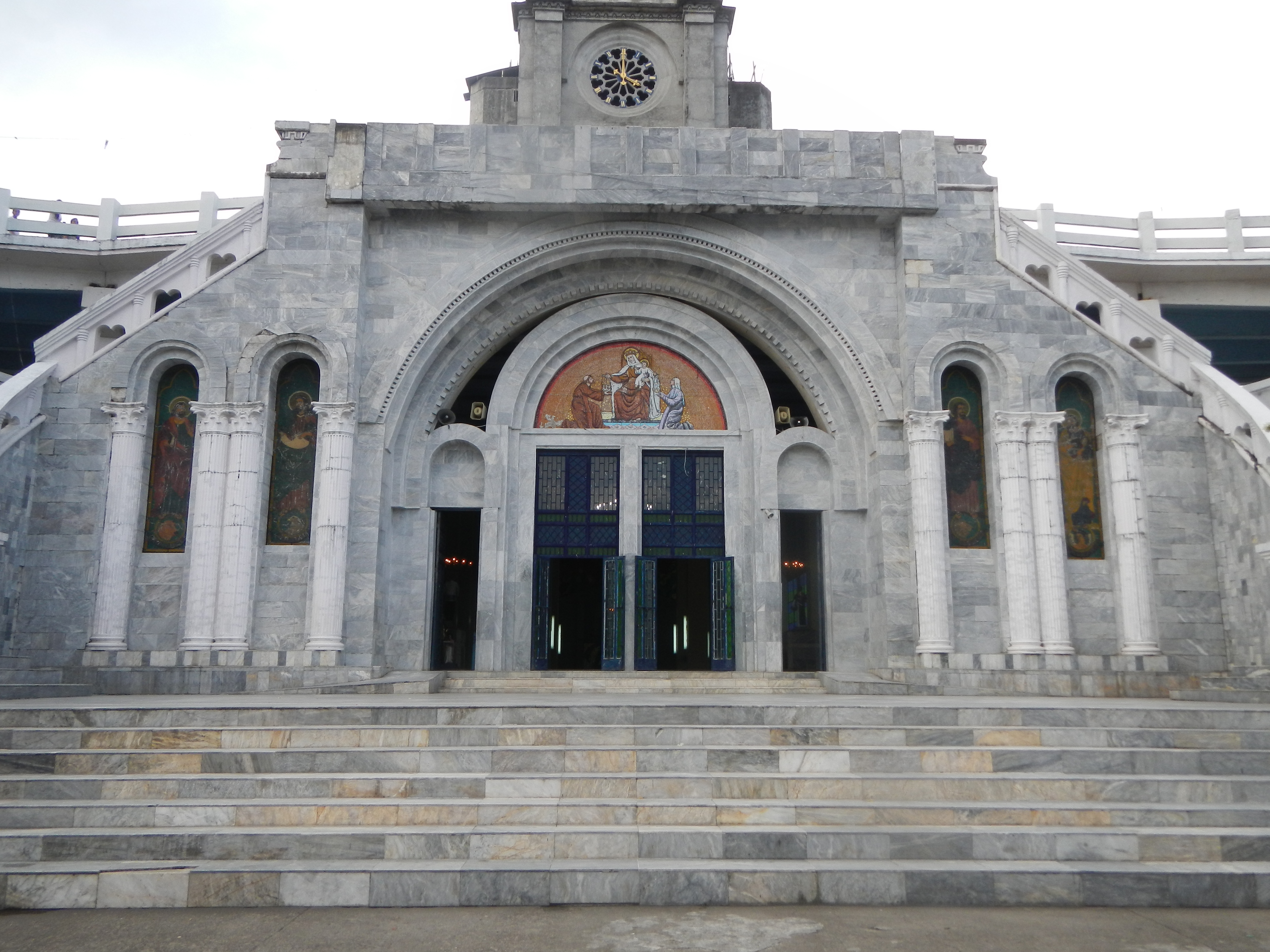
The church's portal.

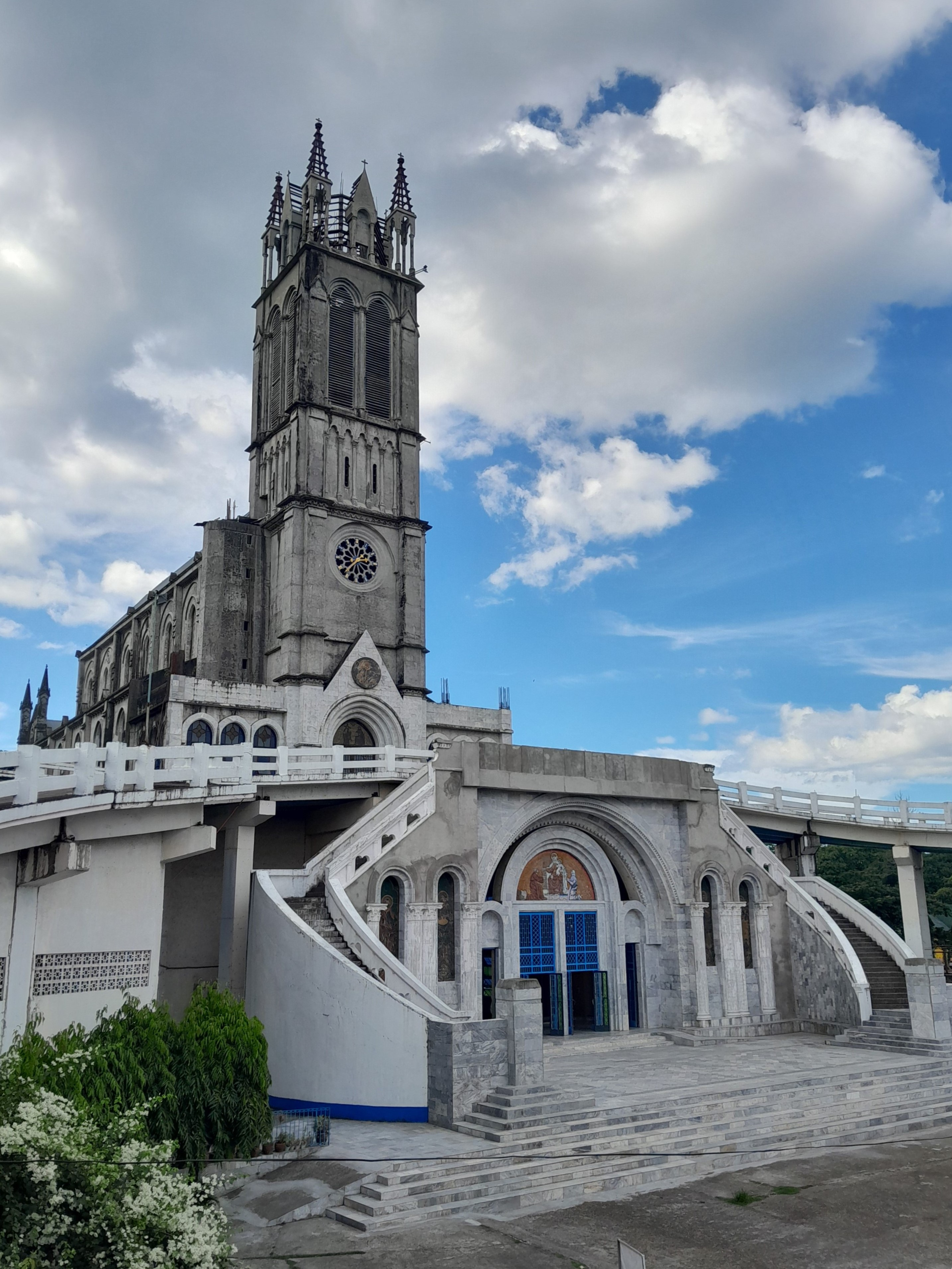
The shrine's church seen from a side.

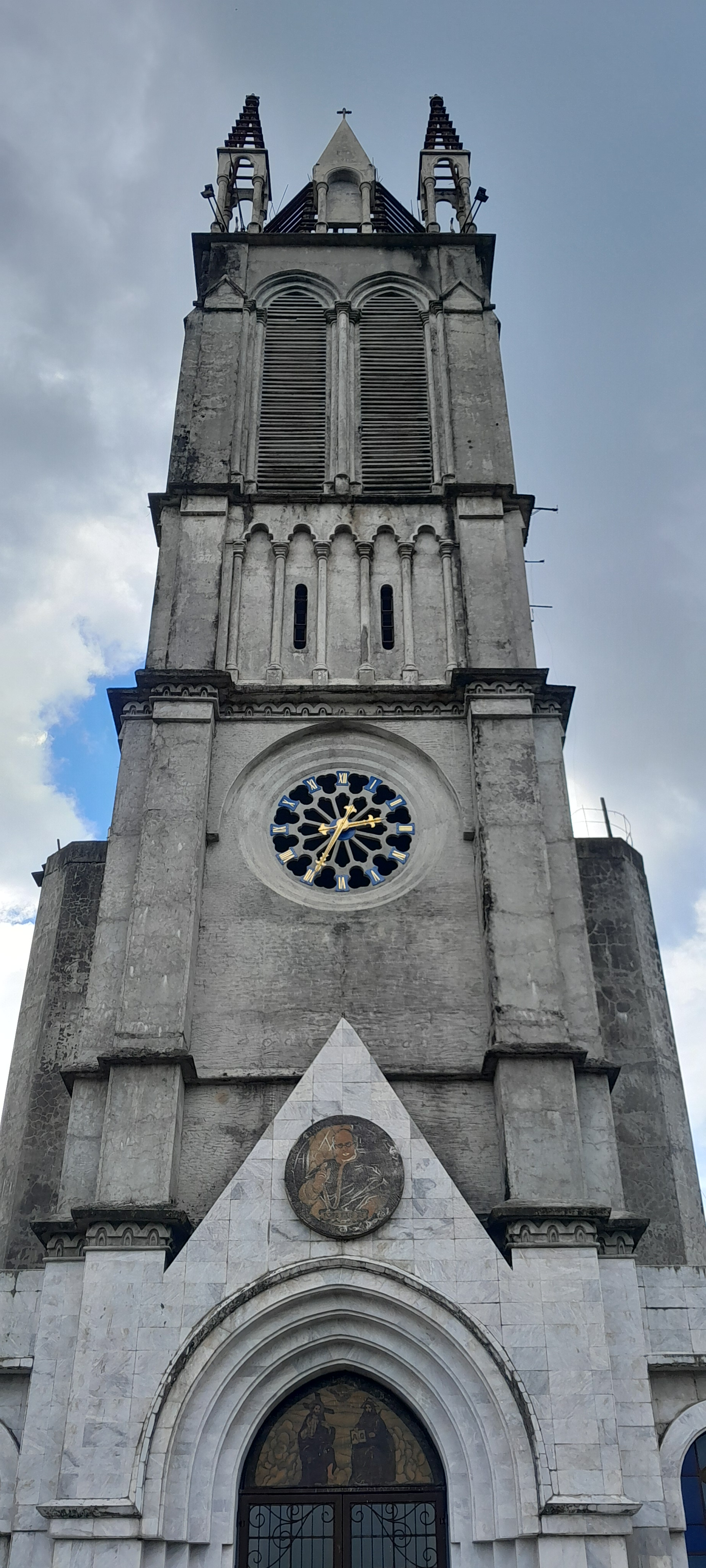
Belfry of the church at the shrine.

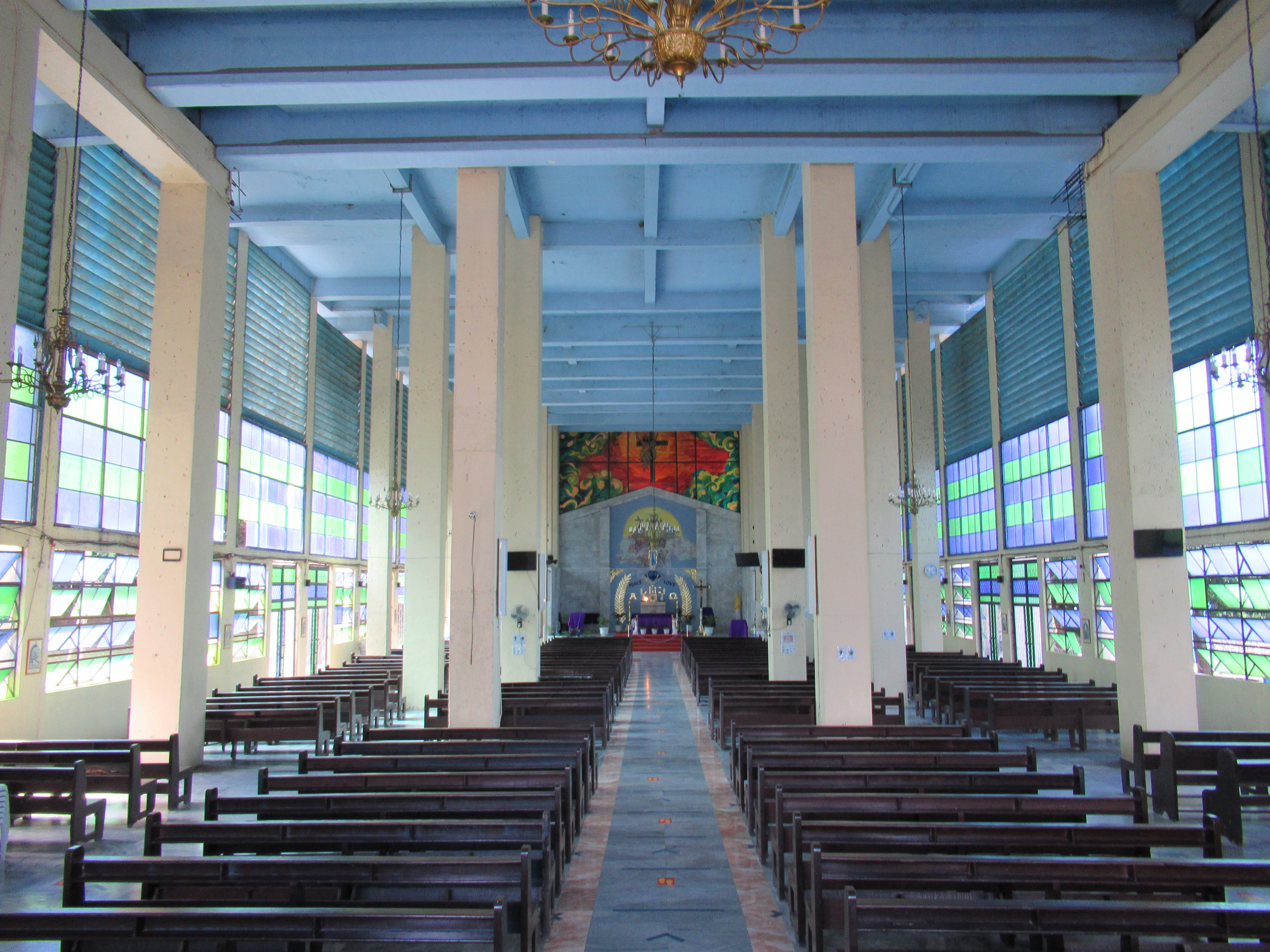
The church's interior in 2022.

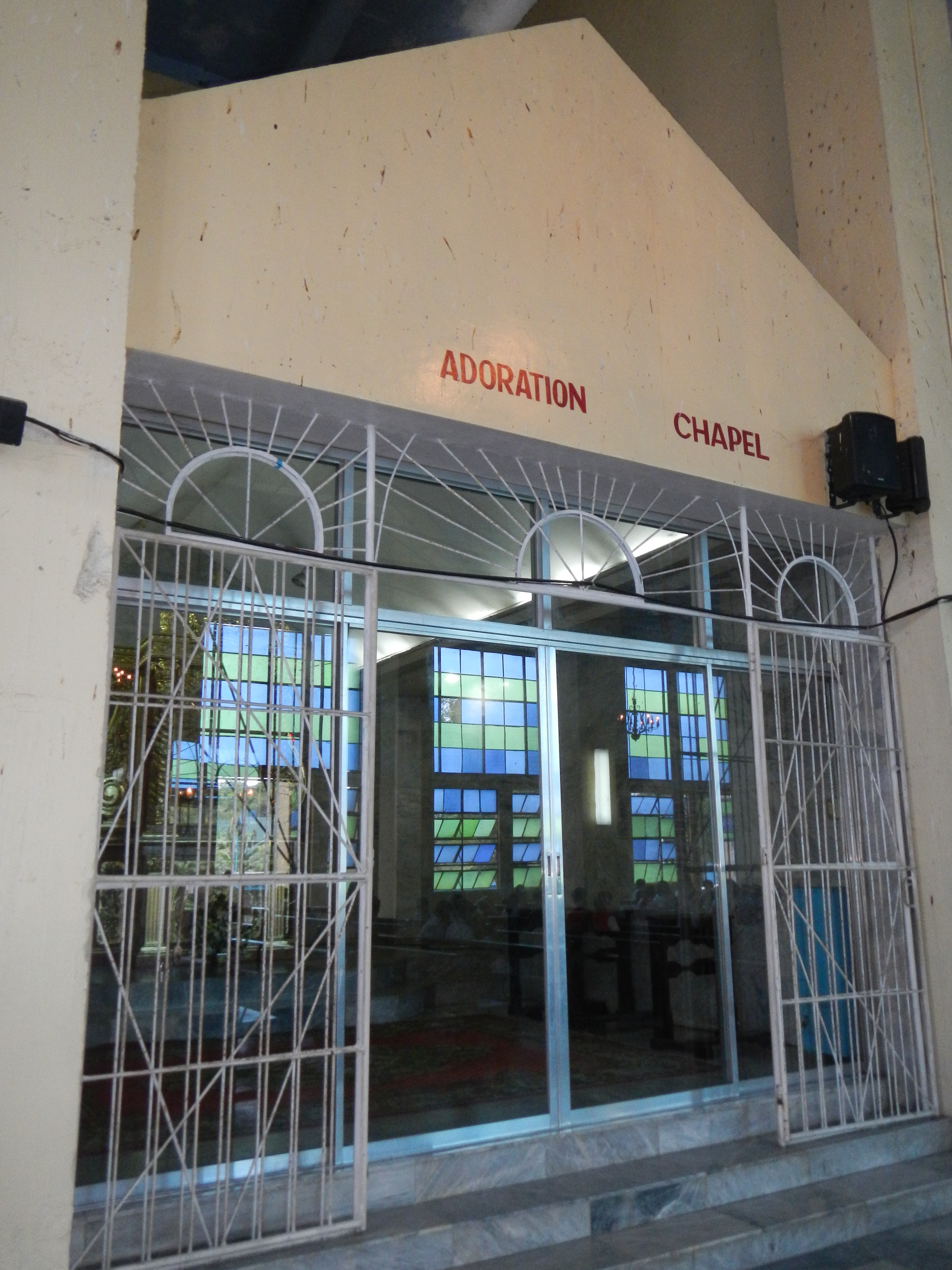
Adoration chapel entrance.
