= Our Lady of Lourdes =

Title of Mary, mother of Jesus

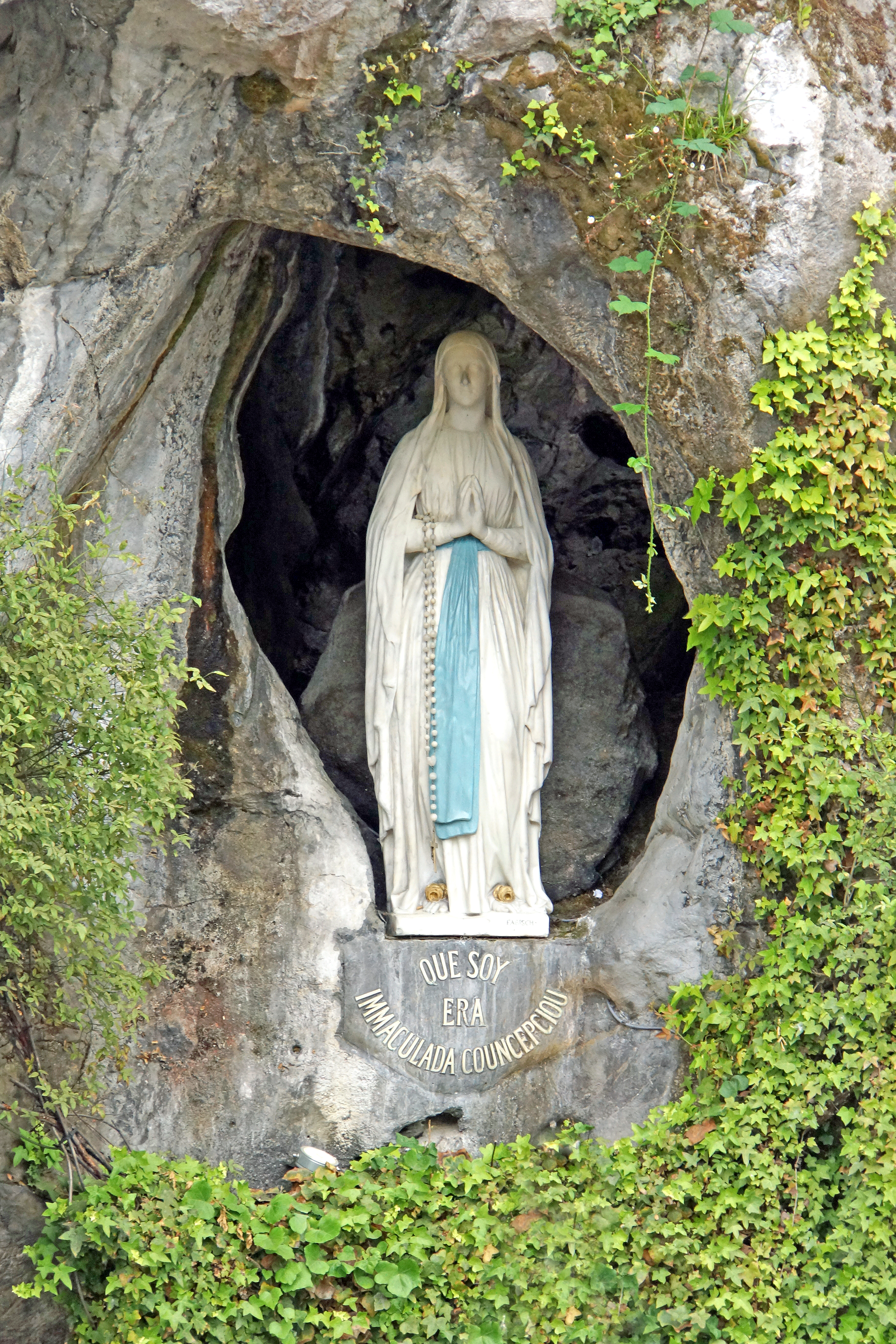
- The statue within the rock cave at Massabielle in Lourdes, where Saint Bernadette Soubirous witnessed the Blessed Virgin Mary
- Location: Lourdes, France
- Date: 11 February to 16 July 1858
- Witness: Saint Bernadette Soubirous
- Type: Marian apparition
- Approval: Pope Pius IX (decree of approval of 1 February 1876)
- Shrine: Sanctuary of Our Lady of Lourdes, Lourdes, France
- Patronage: Lourdes, France, Quezon City, Tagaytay, Daegu, South Korea, Tennessee, Diocese of Lancaster, Lourdes School of Mandaluyong, bodily ills, sick people, asthmatics, protection from diseases
- Feast day: 11 February

Our Lady of Lourdes (French: Notre-Dame de Lourdes; Occitan: Nòstra Senhora de Lorda) is one of the devotional names or titles under which the Catholic Church venerates the Virgin Mary. The name commemorates a series of 18 apparitions reported by a 14-year-old girl, Bernadette Soubirous, in Lourdes, France in 1858. After the first reported apparition on 11 February 1858, Bernadette told her mother that a "Lady" had spoken to her in the cave of Massabielle (1.5 kilometres (0.93 mi) from the town) while Bernadette, her sister, and a friend were gathering firewood. Bernadette reported similar apparitions of the "Lady" over the ensuing weeks, in the last of which the "Lady" identified herself as "the Immaculate Conception". On 18 January 1862, the local Bishop of Tarbes Bertrand-Sévère Laurence endorsed the veneration of the Blessed Virgin Mary in Lourdes.

On 1 February 1876, Pope Pius IX officially granted a decree of canonical coronation to the image as Notre-Dame du Saint Rosaire. The coronation was performed by Cardinal Pier Francesco Meglia at the courtyard of what is now part of the Rosary Basilica on 3 July 1876.

The image of Our Lady of Lourdes has been widely copied and reproduced in shrines and homes, often in garden landscapes. Bernadette Soubirous was canonized by Pope Pius XI in 1933.

Marian devotion has since steadily increased as ecclesiastical investigations sanctioned her visions. In later years, a large church was built at the site that has since become a major site of religious pilgrimage.

== Apparitions ==
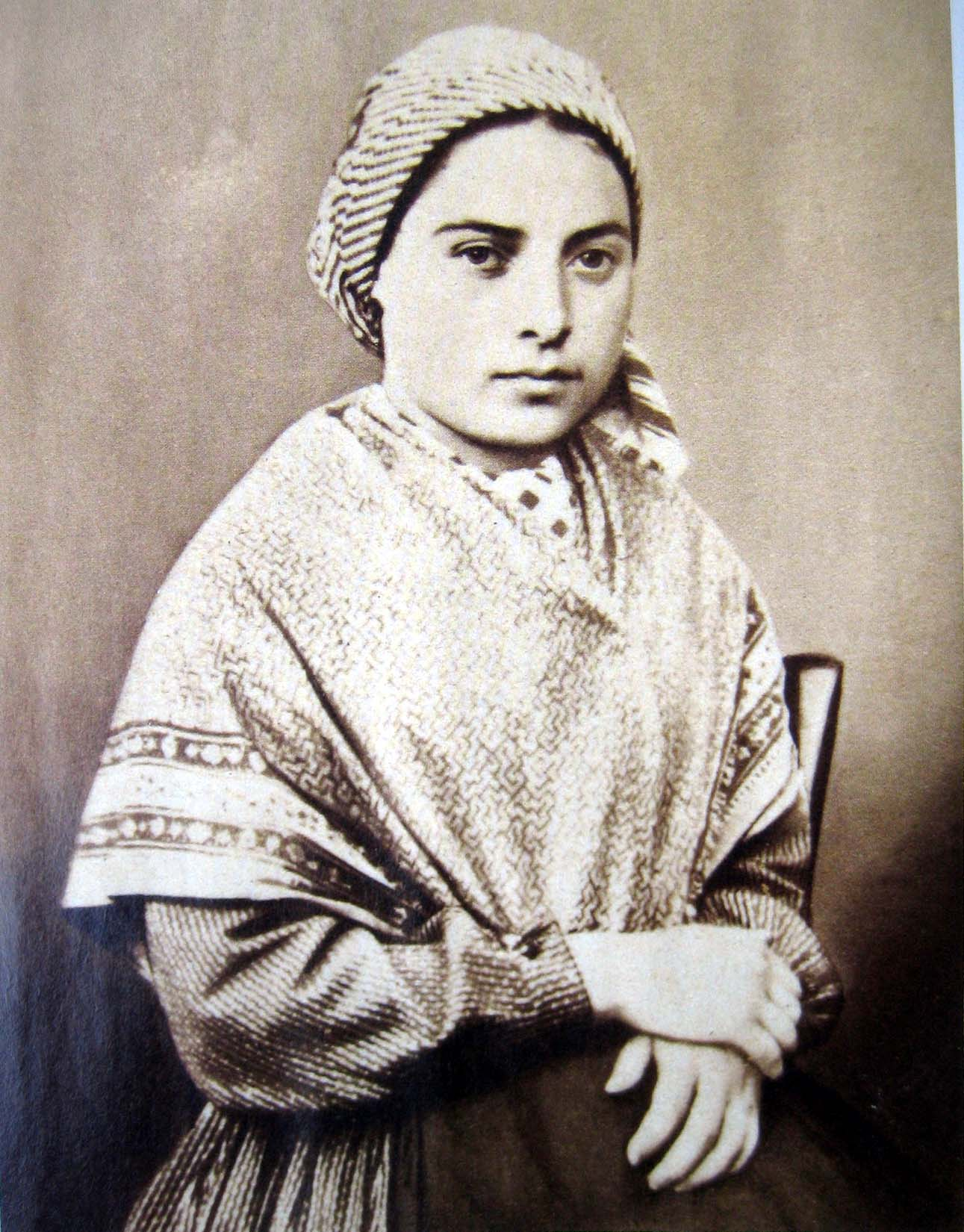
Studio photograph of Bernadette Soubirous (age 14) in daily attire. (c. 1 January 1858)

On 11 February 1858, Soubirous went with her sister Toinette and neighbor Jeanne Abadie to collect some firewood. While taking off her shoes and stockings to wade through the water near the Grotto of Massabielle, she said she heard the sound of two gusts of wind (coups de vent) but the trees and bushes nearby did not move. A wild rose in a natural niche in the grotto, however, did move.

I came back towards the grotto and started taking off my stockings. I had hardly taken off the first stocking when I heard a sound like a gust of wind. Then I turned my head towards the meadow. I saw the trees quite still: I went on taking off my stockings. I heard the same sound again. As I raised my head to look at the grotto, I saw a lady dressed in white, wearing a white dress, a blue girdle and a yellow rose on each foot, the same color as the chain of her rosary; the beads of the rosary were white ... From the niche, or rather the dark alcove behind it, came a dazzling light.

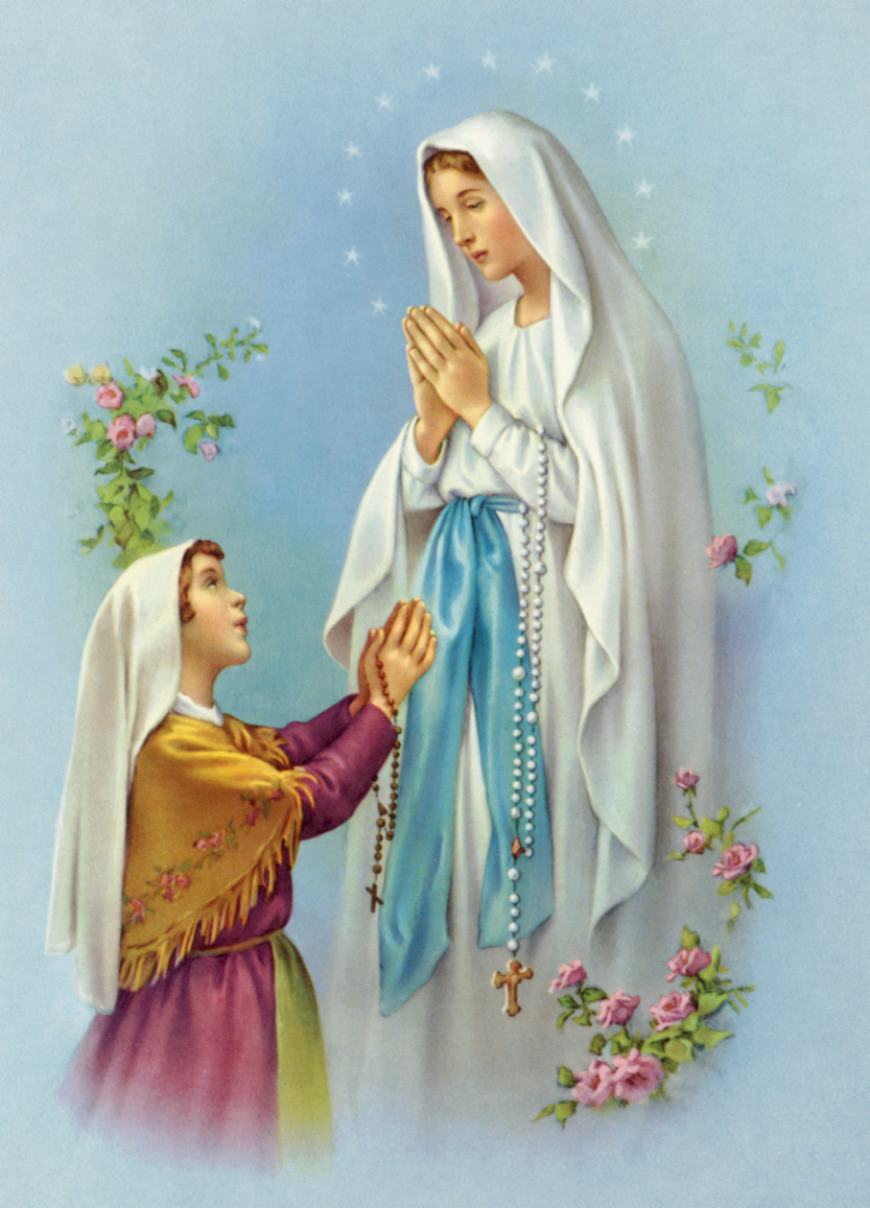
Painting of the apparition of the Virgin Mary to Bernadette Soubirous in the Grotto at Massabielle, in Lourdes, France

Soubirous tried to make the sign of the cross but could not, as her hands were trembling. The lady smiled, and invited Soubirous to pray the rosary with her. Soubirous tried to keep this a secret, but Toinette told her mother. After parental cross-examination, she and her sister received corporal punishment for their story.

Three days later, 14 February, Soubirous returned to the grotto. She had brought holy water as a test that the apparition was not of evil origin/provenance: "The second time was the following Sunday ... Then I started to throw holy water in her direction, and at the same time I said that if she came from God she was to stay, but if not, she must go. She started to smile, and bowed ... This was the second time."

Soubirous' companions are said to have become afraid when they saw her in ecstasy. She remained ecstatic even as they returned to the village. On 18 February, she spoke of being told by the Lady to return to the Grotto over a period of two weeks. She quoted the apparition: "The Lady only spoke to me the third time ... She told me also that she did not promise to make me happy in this world, but in the next."

Soubirous was ordered by her parents to never go there again. She went anyway, and on 24 February, Soubirous related that the apparition asked for prayer and penitence for the conversion of sinners.

The next day, she said the apparition asked her to dig in the ground and drink from the spring she found there. This made her dishevelled and some of her supporters were dismayed, but this act revealed the stream that soon became a focal point for pilgrimages. Although it was muddy at first, the stream became increasingly clean. As word spread, this water was given to medical patients of all kinds, and many reports of miraculous cures followed. Seven of these cures were confirmed as lacking any medical explanations by Professor Verges in 1860. The first person with a "certified miracle" was a woman whose right hand had been deformed as a consequence of an accident. Several miracles turned out to be short-term improvement or even hoaxes, and Catholic Church and government officials became increasingly concerned. The government fenced off the grotto and issued stiff penalties for anybody trying to get near the off-limits area. In the process, Lourdes became a national issue in France, resulting in the intervention of Emperor Napoleon III with an order to reopen the grotto on 4 October 1858. The Church had decided to stay away from the controversy altogether.

Soubirous, knowing the local area well, managed to visit the barricaded grotto under cover of darkness. There, on 25 March, she said she was told: "I am the Immaculate Conception" ("que soy era immaculada concepciou"). On Easter Sunday, 7 April, her examining doctor stated that Soubirous, in ecstasy, was observed to have held her hands over a lit candle without sustaining harm. On 16 July, Soubirous went for the last time to the grotto. "I have never seen her so beautiful before," she reported.

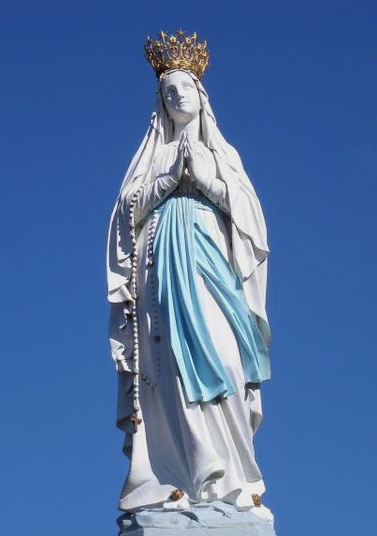
The venerated image of Our Lady of Lourdes was granted a decree of canonical coronation on 1 February 1876 by Pope Pius IX. The coronation ceremony was executed on 3 July 1876. During that same year, an oversized golden laurel wreath was placed at the base as well as a stellar halo being attached to the head of the image; both no longer present.

The Catholic Church, faced with nationwide questions, decided to institute an investigative commission on 17 November 1858. On 18 January 1860, the local bishop finally declared that: "The Virgin Mary did appear indeed to Bernadette Soubirous." These events established the Marian veneration in Lourdes, which together with Fátima and the Basilica of Our Lady of Guadalupe is one of the most frequented Marian shrines in the world, and to which between 4 and 6 million pilgrims travel annually.

In 1863, Joseph-Hugues Fabisch was charged to create a statue of the Virgin according to Soubirous's description. The work was placed in the grotto and solemnly dedicated on 4 April 1864 in presence of 20,000 pilgrims.

The veracity of the apparitions of Lourdes is not an article of faith for Catholics. Nevertheless, all recent popes have visited the Marian shrine at some time. Benedict XV, Pius XI, and John XXIII went there as bishops, Pius XII as papal delegate. He also issued an encyclical, Le pèlerinage de Lourdes, on the one-hundredth anniversary of the apparitions in 1958. John Paul II visited Lourdes three times during his pontificate, and twice before as a bishop.

=== Bernadette's description of Mary ===
Soubirous described the apparition as a jeune fille ("young girl") of about 14–15 years old; Soubirous insisted that the apparition was no taller than herself. At 1.40 metres (4 ft 7 in) tall, Soubirous was diminutive even by the standards of other poorly-nourished children.

Soubirous described the apparition as dressed in a flowing white robe, with a blue sash around her waist. This was the uniform of a religious group called the Children of Mary, which, on account of her poverty, Soubirous was not permitted to join (although she was admitted after the apparitions). Her aunt Bernarde was a long-time member.

The statue that currently stands in the niche within the grotto of Massabielle was created by the Lyonnais sculptor Joseph-Hugues Fabisch in 1864. Although it has become an iconographic symbol of Our Lady of Lourdes, it depicts a figure which is not only older and taller than Soubirous' description, but also more in keeping with orthodox and traditional representations of the Virgin Mary. On seeing the statue, Soubirous was profoundly disappointed with this representation of her vision.

=== Similar events ===
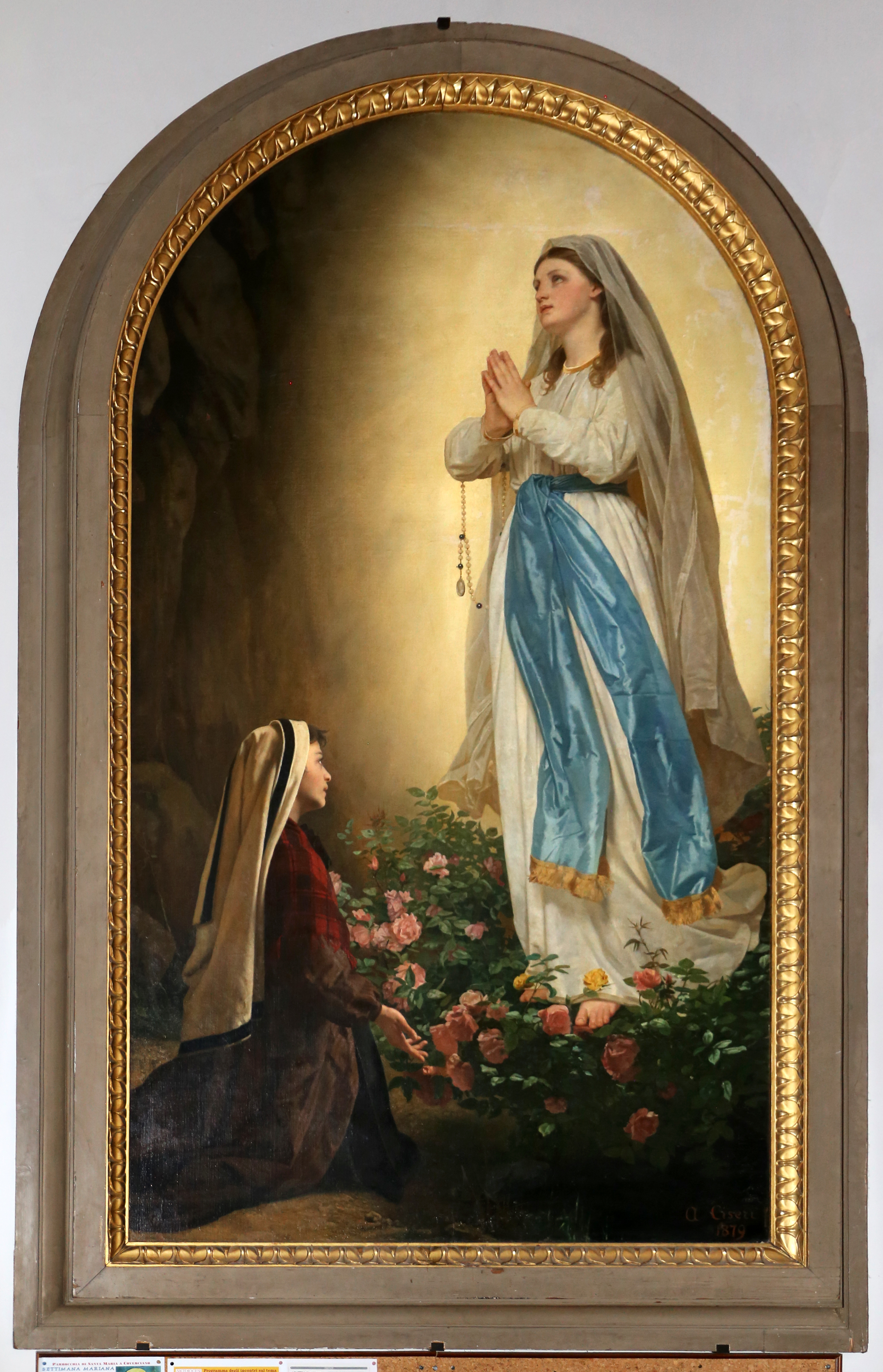
Apparition of Our Lady of Lourdes to Bernadette by Antonio Ciseri, 1879

In nearby Lestelle-Bétharram, only a few kilometres from Lourdes, some shepherds guarding their flocks in the mountains observed a vision of a ray of light that guided them to the discovery of a statue of the Virgin Mary. Two attempts were made to remove the statue to a more prominent position; each time it disappeared and returned to its original location, at which a small chapel was built for it.

In the early 16th century, a 12-year-old shepherdess called Anglèze de Sagazan received a vision of the Virgin Mary near the spring at Garaison (part of the commune of Monléon-Magnoac), somewhat further away. Anglèze's story is strikingly similar to that of Soubirous: she was a pious but illiterate and poorly educated girl, extremely impoverished, who spoke only in the local language, Gascon Occitan, but successfully convinced authorities that her vision was genuine and persuaded them to obey the instructions of her apparitions. Like Soubirous, she was the only one who could see the apparition (others could apparently hear it); however, the apparition at Garaison's supernatural powers tended toward the miraculous provision of abundant food, rather than healing the sick and injured. Mid-nineteenth century commentators noted the parallels between the events at Massabielle and Garaison, and interpreted the similarities as proof of the divine nature of Soubirous' claims. At the time of Soubirous, Garaison was a noted center of pilgrimage and Marian devotion.

There are also several similarities between the apparition at La Salette, near Grenoble, and Lourdes. La Salette is many hundreds of kilometres from Lourdes, and the events at La Salette predate those in Lourdes by 12 years. However, the Marian apparition at La Salette was tall and maternal (not petite and gentle like her Lourdes apparition) and had a darker, more threatening series of messages. It is not certain if Soubirous was aware of the events at La Salette.

=== Approval by a local bishop ===
On 18 January 1862, the Bishop of Tarbes Betrand Severt Laurence declared the following regarding the Marian apparitions:

We are inspired by the Commission comprising wise, holy, learned and experienced priests who questioned the child, studied the facts, examined everything and weighed all the evidence. We have also called on science, and we remain convinced that the Apparitions are supernatural and divine, and that by consequence, what Soubirous saw was the Most Blessed Virgin. Our convictions are based on the testimony of Soubirous, but above all on the things that have happened, things which can be nothing other than divine intervention.

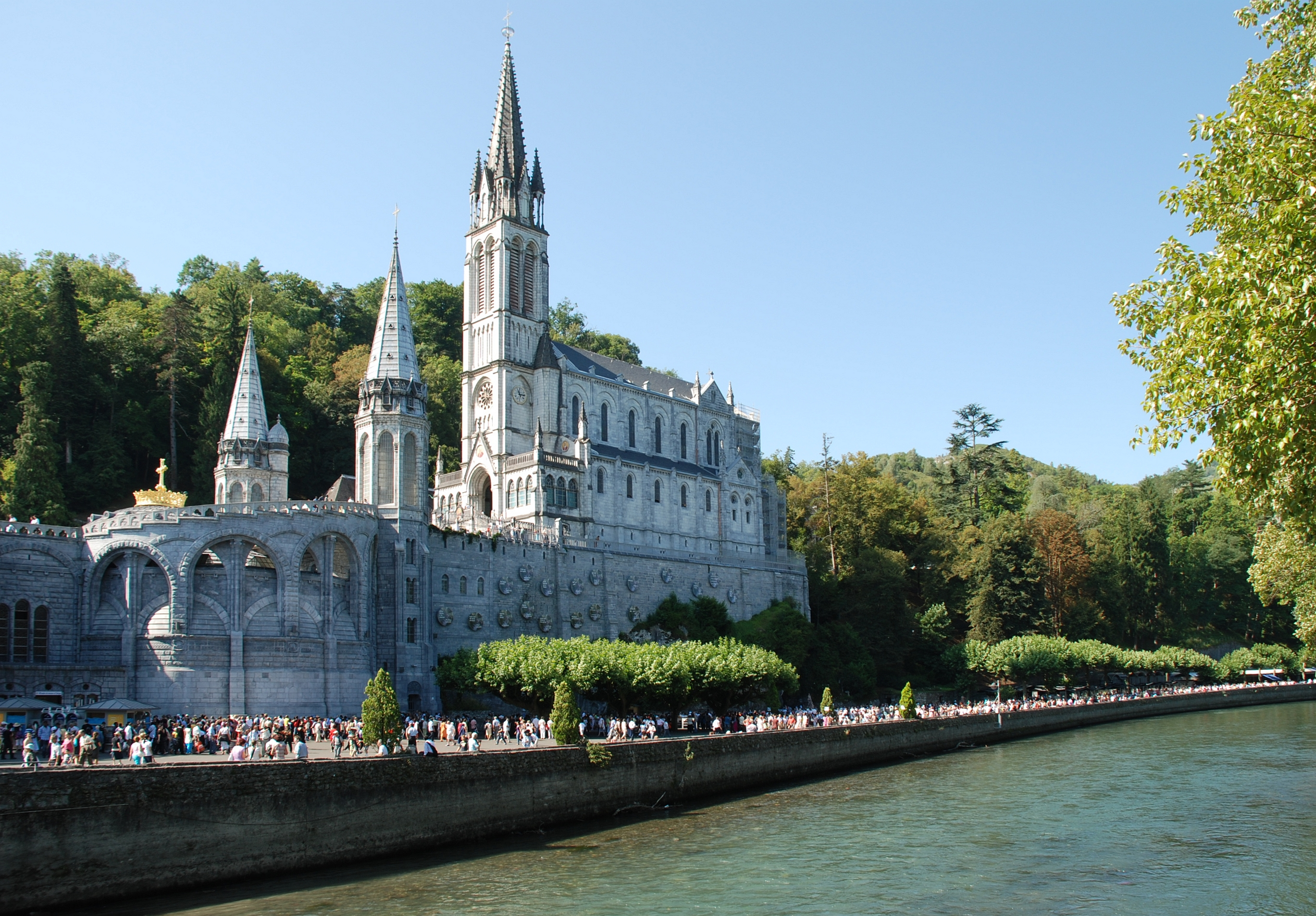
The sanctuary basilica built at Lourdes directly above the grotto of the apparitions

== Pontifical approbations ==
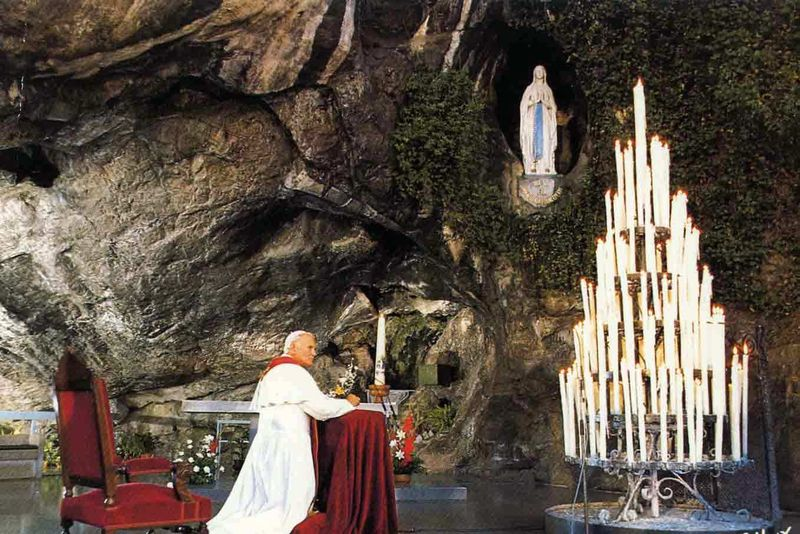
Pope John Paul II in 1983 at the Grotto of Massabielle of the Lourdes Shrine

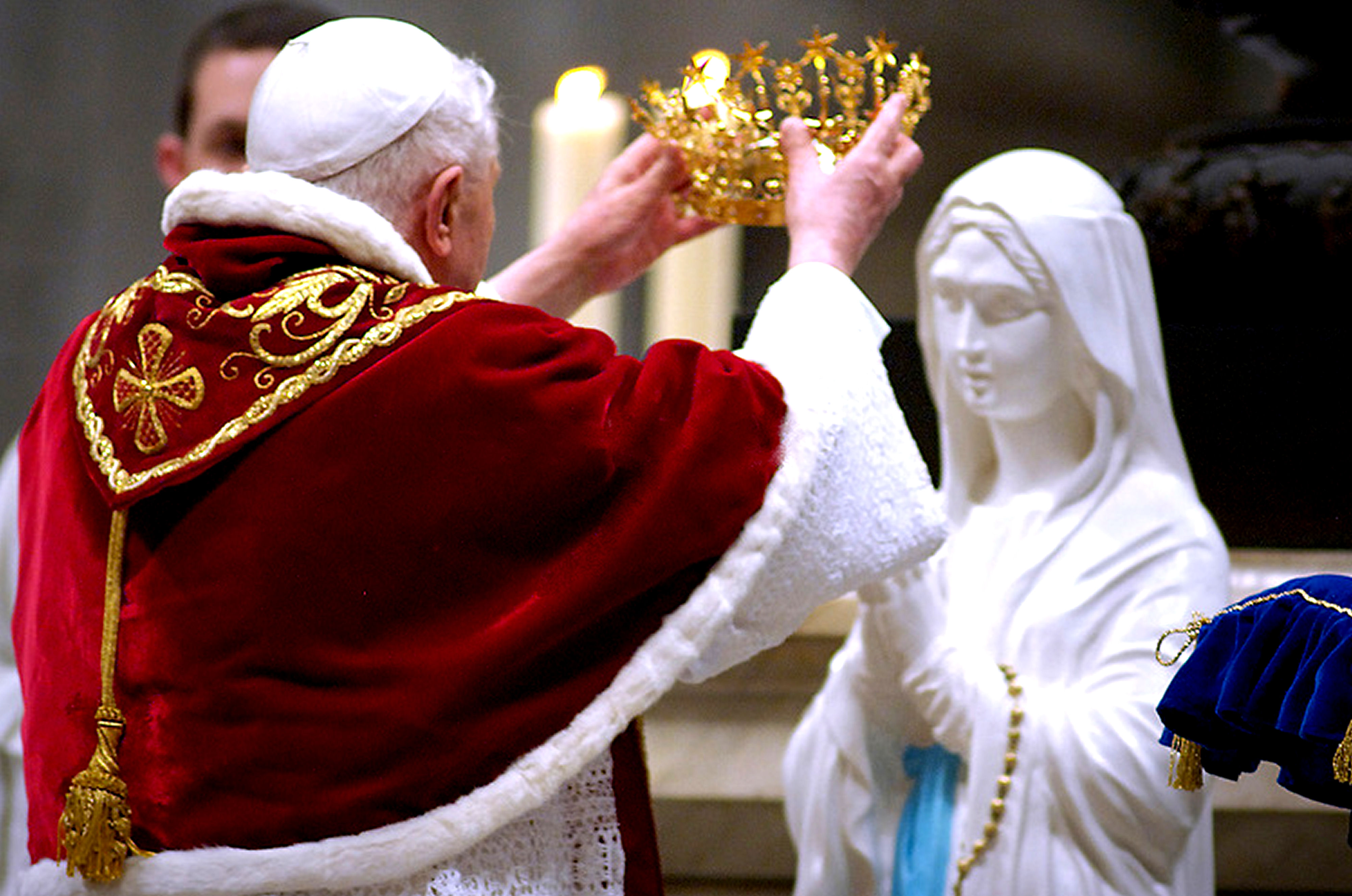
Pope Benedict XVI placing a crown (Note: The event was not a rite of canonical coronation, nor a re-coronation of the image at the Rosary basilica.) on Our Lady of Lourdes for the plenary indulgence he attached for pilgrims of the World Day of the Sick. 11 February 2007, Saint Peter's Basilica.

- Pope Pius IX approved the veneration in Lourdes and supported the building of the Cathedral in 1870 to which he donated several gifts. He approved indulgences and issued a canonical coronation to the courtyard image of the basilica on 1 February 1876. The coronation ceremony was performed by Cardinal Meglia on 3 July 1876.
- Pope Leo XIII issued an apostolic letter Parte Humanae Generi in commemoration of the consecration of the new cathedral in Lourdes in 1879. He later issued a decree for a canonical coronation towards an image of Lourdes for Pondicherry, India on 21 February 1886. The rite of coronation was carried on 8 May 1886. The same pontiff also made comparative remarks to the Basilica of Our Lady of Brebières remarking it as "The Lourdes of the North" due to the influx of Marian pilgrims and miraculous claims of healings attached to the site.
- As Archbishop of Bologna, Archbishop Giacomo della Chiesa (the future Pope Benedict XV) organized a diocesan pilgrimage to Lourdes, requesting for Marian veneration in that area.
- Pope Pius X in 1907 introduced the feast of the apparition of the Immaculate Virgin of Lourdes. In the same year he issued his encyclical Pascendi Dominici gregis, in which he specifically repeated the permission to venerate the virgin in Lourdes.
- Pope Pius XI beatified the Marian visionary Bernadette Soubirous on 6 June 1925 and canonized her on the Feast of the Immaculate Conception on 8 December 1933 and determined her feast day to be 18 February. He later on 16 July 1934 issued a decree Edocemur Admomum confirming privileges of patronage for an image with the same namesake for the Church of Saint Martin in Stella, Liguria, in Savona, Italy. This document was signed by Cardinal Eugenio Pacelli. Later in 1937, the pope sent the same cardinal as his legate to personally visit the sanctuary at Lourdes.
- Pope Pius XII issued a papal encyclical Le pèlerinage de Lourdes on the 100th centenary anniversary of the Marian apparitions of Lourdes.
- As Archbishop of Milan, Giovanni Battista Montini (the future Pope Paul VI) visited Lourdes.
- Pope John Paul II made three religious pilgrimages to Lourdes. He also instituted the World Day of the Sick in honor of Our Lady of Lourdes on 13 May 1992.
- Pope Benedict XVI issued a novelty coronation towards the Lourdes image on World Day of the Sick in 2007. In September 2008, he visited Lourdes commemorating the 150th anniversary of the Marian apparitions.
- Pope Francis granted a canonical coronation towards a Lourdes image for the Philippines on 5 September 2019. The coronation took place on 22 August 2020.

== Reported healings ==
The location of the spring was allegedly described to Soubirous by an apparition of Our Lady of Lourdes on 25 February 1858. Since that time many thousands of pilgrims to Lourdes have followed the instruction attributed to Our Lady of Lourdes to "drink at the spring and wash in it".

Lourdes water has become a focus of devotion to the Virgin Mary at Lourdes. The Catholic Church permits the water's consumption and use by bathers and other visitors to Lourdes, but the Church has taken no position concerning the water's supposed healing properties. Since the apparitions, many people have claimed to have been cured by drinking or bathing in it, and the Lourdes authorities provide it free of charge to any who ask for it.

An analysis of the water was commissioned by then mayor of Lourdes, Monsieur Anselme Lacadé in 1858. It was conducted by a professor in Toulouse, who determined that the water was potable and that it contained the following: oxygen, nitrogen, carbonic acid, carbonates of lime and magnesia, a trace of carbonate of iron, an alkaline carbonate or silicate, chlorides of potassium and sodium, traces of sulphates of potassium and soda, traces of ammonia, and traces of iodine. Essentially, the water is pure and inert. Lacadé had hoped that Lourdes water might have special mineral properties which would allow him to develop Lourdes into a spa town, to compete with neighbouring Cauterets and Bagnères-de-Bigorre. Skeptical responses to those reports often claim that auto-suggestion and the placebo effect were the cause of those healings after pilgrimage to the sanctuary.

=== The Lourdes Medical Bureau ===
To ensure claims of cures were examined properly and to protect the town from fraudulent claims of miracles, the Lourdes Medical Bureau (Bureau Medical) was established at the request of Pope Pius X. It is completely under medical rather than ecclesiastical supervision. Approximately 7,500 people have sought to have their case confirmed as a miracle, of which 70 have been declared scientifically inexplicable by the bureau. The methodological procedures of the bureau have received numerous criticisms over the years, and the healings sometimes considered to be a "neuropsychiatric phenomenon". Some have coined the Lourdes effect to describe how none of the healings have involved dramatic, unambiguous events growing back a limb but inconclusive and opaque results.

== Sanctuary of Our Lady of Lourdes ==
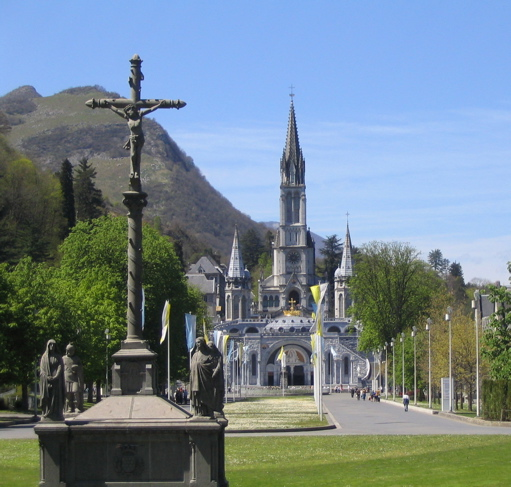
The Sanctuary of Our Lady of Lourdes

The Sanctuary of Our Lady of Lourdes is a group of churches, religious buildings and places of worship on the site where the Lourdes apparitions occurred in 1858, in the town of Lourdes, in France. The area is owned and administered by the Catholic Church and is a destination for millions of pilgrims coming to venerate Our Lady of Lourdes. The sanctuary holds devotional activities, offices, and ensures accommodation for pilgrims with disabilities and those assisting them. The 52 hectares area of the sanctuary includes the grotto of Massabielle where Bernadette Soubirous is said to have seen the Virgin Mary and three basilicas, known as the Upper Basilica, the Lower Basilica and the Underground Basilica. It also includes a church, several chapels, a calvary on a hill, an area of ground for gatherings, a square and alleys for processions, fountains providing Lourdes water to pilgrims, baths for immersion in Lourdes water, residences for sick and disabled pilgrims, and the offices of the Lourdes Medical Bureau. The sanctuary is visited by millions each year, and Lourdes has become one of the prominent pilgrimage sites of the world. Large numbers of pilgrims travel to Lourdes each year in the hope of physical healing or spiritual renewal.

== Other places of veneration ==
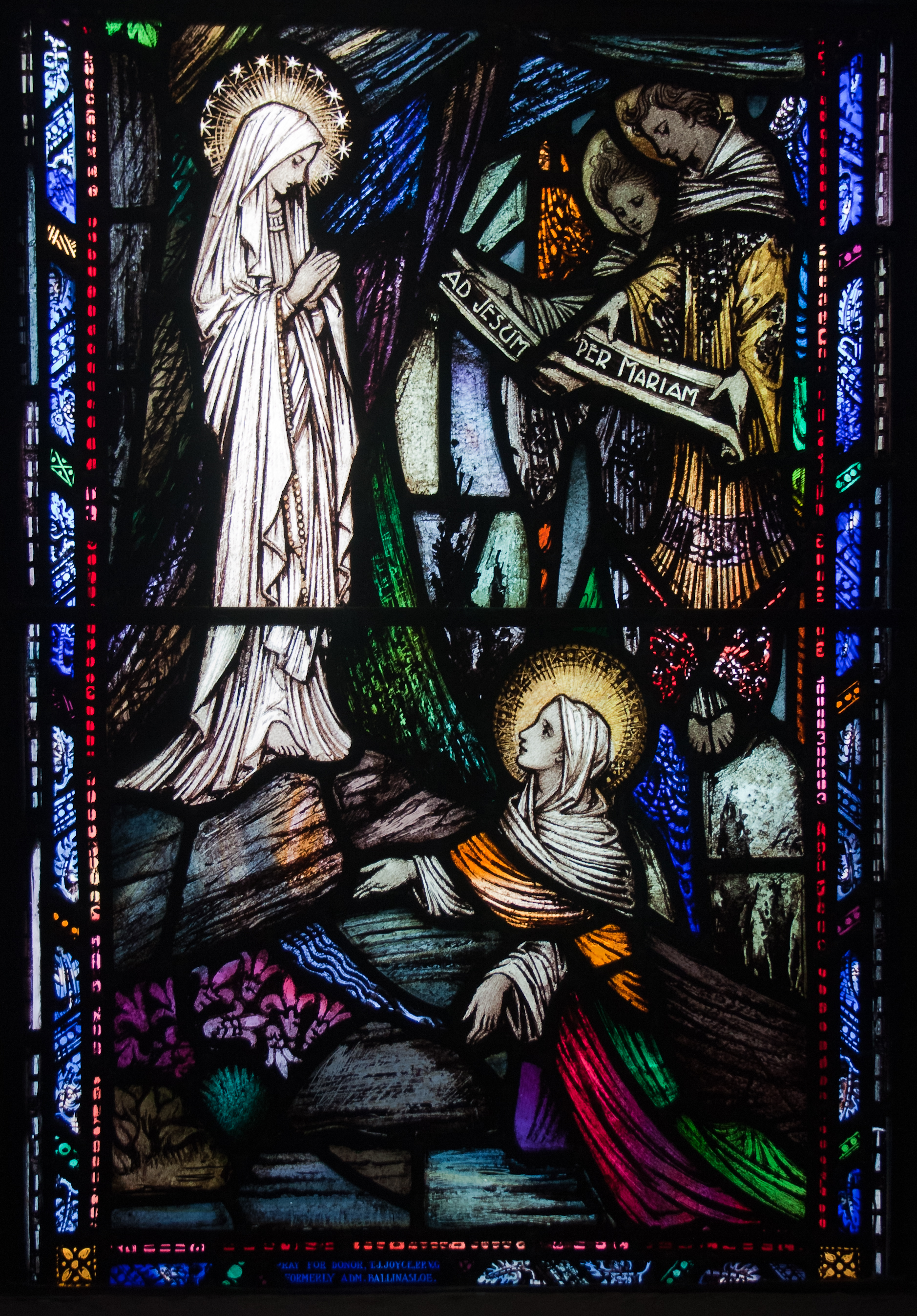
Stained glass of Our Lady of Lourdes and Saint Bernadette by William Earley

- Grotta di Lourdes at the Gardens of Vatican City
- University of Notre Dame, Indiana, US
- University of Mary in Bismarck, North Dakota
- Internal grotto of Church of Notre Dame (New York City)
- Mount Saint Mary's University, Emmitsburg, Maryland
- Saint Mary-of-the-Woods, Sisters of Providence
- Shrine of the Most Blessed Sacrament in Hanceville, Alabama
- Shrine of St. Therese of Lisieux in Nesquehoning, Pennsylvania
- Saint Anne's Shrine in Fall River, Massachusetts
- Shrine of Lourdes in Litchfield, Connecticut
- Lourdes Grotto, Baguio City, Philippines
- Lourdes Grotto, Obrajes, La Paz, Bolivia
- Lourdes Grotto, Villa de Matel, Convent of the Congregation of the Sisters of Charity of the Incarnate Word, Houston, Texas
- Lourdes Grotto, San Jose Del Monte, Bulacan, Philippines
- National Shrine of Our Lady of Lourdes, Quezon City, Philippines
- Sunken Shrine of Our Lady of Lourdes of Cabetican, Cabetican, Bacolor, Pampanga, Philippines
- Myeongdong Cathedral, Seoul, South Korea
- Gruta Nuestra Señora de Lourdes, Mar del Plata, Buenos Aires, Argentina
- Flatrock, Newfoundland and Labrador, Canada
- Carfin Grotto, Scotland
- Our Lady of Lourdes Church, Houston, Texas
- Our Lady of Lourdes Church, Mianyang, Sichuan, China
- Gunadala Matha Shrine, Vijayawada, India
- Basilica of Our Lady of Lourdes, Tamil Nadu, India
- Our Lady of Lourdes Shrine, Chennai, India
- Parish of Nuestra Señora de Lourdes, La Plata, Buenos Aires, Argentina

== Venerated images with pontifical decree ==
- Pope Pius IX granted a decree of coronation towards the image at the courtyard of the Rosary Basilica in Lourdes, France, on 1 February 1876.
- Pope Leo XIII let the image of the high altar in the Shrine of Our Lady of Lourdes in Pondicherry, India, crowned via decree on 21 February 1886.
- The image enshrined at the parish of Saint Martin in Stella, Savona, Italy, was crowned in July 1909; Pope Pius XI decreed that with special privileges on 16 July 1934.
- The Venerated Image (Lourdes de Manila) in Quezon City, Philippines, was crowned by Pope Francis via formal decree on 5 September 2019.

== In popular culture ==
- In 1941, the events became the basis of Franz Werfel's best-selling novel The Song of Bernadette. In 1943, the novel was filmed under the same title. Jennifer Jones played the title role while Linda Darnell portrayed the Virgin Mary.
- In 1961 Daniéle Ajoret portrayed Bernadette in Bernadette of Lourdes (French title: Il suffit d'aimer or Love is Enough) of Robert Darène.
- The 1997 book The Diving Bell and the Butterfly by Jean-Dominique Bauby features a scene in which he and his girlfriend, Josephine, go to see Our Lady of Lourdes, known in the book as the Madonna.
- The 2009 French feature film Lourdes tells the story of wheelchair user Christine, who in order to escape her isolation, makes a life changing journey to Lourdes, the iconic site of pilgrimage in the Pyrenees.
- Lourdes, 2019 documentary
- The plot of the 2023 film The Miracle Club centers on a pilgrimage to Lourdes to visit the baths.
- Bernadette the Musical starring Eyma as Bernadette Soubirous plays at the Athenaeum Center for Thought and Culture in Chicago, Illinois from 12 February to 15 March 2026.

== See also ==
- Le pèlerinage de Lourdes
