= Le pèlerinage de Lourdes =

1957 encyclical by Pope Pius XII on the apparitions at Lourdes

Le pèlerinage de Lourdes French for 'The pilgrimage to Lourdes' Encyclical of Pope Pius XII
- Signature date: 2 July 1957
- Subject: Warning against materialism on the centenary of the apparitions at Lourdes
- Number: 38 of 41 of the pontificate
- Text: In English

Le pèlerinage de Lourdes is the only encyclical of Pope Pius XII issued in French. It includes warnings against materialism on the centenary of the apparitions at Lourdes. It was given at Rome, from St. Peter's Basilica, on the feast of the Visitation of the Most Holy Virgin, July 2, 1957, the nineteenth year of his pontificate.

The encyclical recalls pleasant memories of the pilgrimage to Lourdes which Pope Pius XII undertook as papal delegate at the Eucharistic and Marian Celebrations in 1937. The Pope reminds the faithful of France that every Christian land is a Marian land and that "there is not one nation redeemed in the blood of Christ which does not glory in proclaiming Mary its Mother and Patroness". He then recalls the history of Marian veneration, the history of Lourdes and the contributions of the Popes to her veneration in Lourdes.

== The Popes and Lourdes ==
The first part of the encyclical reviews the contributions of the papacy to the veneration in Lourdes.

=== Pius IX and Leo XIII ===
The encyclical recalls that in 1892 Leo XIII granted the proper Office and Mass of the feast "In apparitione Beatae Mariae Virginis Immaculatae", which his successor was to extend to the universal Church a short time later. He installed and blessed a reproduction of the 'Grotto of Massabielle' in the Vatican gardens, and prayed:

In her power may the Virgin Mother, who once cooperated through her love with the birth of the faithful into the Church, now be the means and guardian of our salvation; may she return the tranquillity of peace to troubled souls; may she hasten the return of Jesus Christ in private and public life.

On 3 July 1876, Pius IX crowned the statue of Our Lady of the Rosary at the Rosary Basilica in Lourdes.

=== Saint Pius X ===
The encyclical states that fifty years after the definition of the dogma of the Immaculate Conception, Saint Pius X wrote in Ad diem illum that his predecessor, Pius IX, "had hardly defined it to be of Catholic faith that Mary was from her very origin exempt from sin, when the Virgin herself began performing miracles at Lourdes." Pius X created the episcopal see of Lourdes, and authorized the introduction of the cause of beatification of Bernadette. He emphasized the harmony at Lourdes between Eucharistic worship and Marian prayer.

Pius XII concludes: "It could not have been otherwise. Everything about Mary directs us to her Son, our only Savior, in anticipation of whose merits she was immaculate and full of grace. Everything about Mary raises us to the praise of the adorable Trinity." The encyclical adds that Saint Pius X viewed the shrine of Lourdes as surpassing in glory all others in the Catholic world.

=== Benedict XV and Pius XI ===
The encyclical states that Benedict XV added new indulgences, but was unable to do much more because of the First World War. Pius XI, who had been to Lourdes himself as a pilgrim, continued the work of Benedict XV. He canonized Bernadette, Sister Marie Bernard, and described Lourdes as "now justly considered one of the principal Marian shrines in the world". Pius XII recalls his own previous encyclical, Fulgens corona, in which he wrote about Lourdes:

The Blessed Virgin Mary herself wanted to confirm by some special sign the definition which the Vicar on earth of her Divine Son had pronounced amidst the vigorous approbation of the whole Church.

== The challenge of materialism ==
The second part of the encyclical deals with conversion, specifically a Marian conversion of heart and society, with Pius XII emphasizing the Marian invitation to the conversion of hearts and the hope of forgiveness, with the emphasis that individual conversion would not be enough; instead, Pius XII appeals for Christian renewal of society in answer to Mary's appeal.

=== Definition ===
Pius XII defines the root of evil as temptation towards materialism, a definition he does not confine to a materialistic philosophy, instead describing its existence also as "a love of money which creates ever greater havoc, as modern enterprises expand, which unfortunately determines many of the decisions which weigh heavy on the life of the people. It finds expression in the cult of the body, in excessive desire for comforts, a flight from all the austerities of life, an unrestrained search for pleasure, a concept of life which regulates everything exclusively in terms of material prosperity and earthly satisfactions." The encyclical teaches that the school of Mary provides many practical answers.

=== School of Mary ===
In the school of Mary one can learn to live not only to give Christ to the world, but also to await with faith the hour of Jesus, and to remain with Mary at the foot of the cross. Wherever providence has placed a person, there is always more to be done for God's cause.

The encyclical states that priests should with supernatural confidence show the narrow road which leads to life. The consecrated and religious fight under Mary's banner against inordinate lust for freedom, riches, and pleasures. In response to the Immaculate, they will fight with the weapons of prayer and penance and gain triumphs of charity. Christian families must remain faithful to their vital mission in society, and consecrate themselves in the current jubilee year to the Immaculate Heart of Mary. For married couples this consecration will be a valuable aid in their conjugal duties of chastity and faithfulness and keep pure the atmosphere in which children grow up. Families inspired by devotion to Mary are living centers of social rebirth and apostolic influence.

Professional and civic affairs offer a vast field of Marian action. Gathered at the Virgin's feet, and open to her teachings, self-examination will uproot any false judgments and selfish impulses. Christians of every class and every nation will try to be of one mind in truth and charity, and to banish misunderstanding and suspicion. The quest for social and political peace among men is, above all, a moral problem, because no reform can bear fruit, no agreement be lasting without a conversion and cleansing of heart. In the jubilee year the Virgin of Lourdes reminds all men of this truth.

=== The poor and suffering ===
Pius XII teaches that Mary looks upon some of her children with a special affection, the lowly, the poor, and the afflicted whom Jesus loved so much.

Go to her, you who are crushed by material misery, defenseless against the hardships of life and the indifference of men. Go to her, you who are assailed by sorrows and moral trials. Go to her, beloved invalids and infirm, you who are sincerely welcomed and honored at Lourdes as the suffering members of our Lord. Go to her and receive peace of heart, strength for your daily duties, joy for the sacrifice you offer.

The Pontiff states that the Immaculate Virgin knows the secret ways by which grace operates in souls. She also knows the great price which God attaches to sufferings, united to those of the Savior. These sufferings can greatly contribute. The encyclical closes with a quote of Saint Bernard of Clairvaux:

Amid dangers, difficulties, and doubts, think of Mary, invoke Mary's aid. ...If you follow her, you will not stray; if you entreat her, you will not lose hope; if you reflect upon her, you will not err; if she supports you, you will not fall; if she protects you, you will not fear; if she leads you, you will not grow weary; if she is propitious, you will reach your goal.

Pope Pius XII declares himself fully convinced that Mary will hear all prayers. In this his last Marian encyclical, he imparts to the faithful, the shrine of Lourdes and its pilgrims, "the most bounteous outpouring of grace with all Our heart, and with Our constant and paternal best wishes, the Apostolic Benediction."

== See also ==
- Marian papal encyclicals and Apostolic Letters
