= Rosary Basilica =

Basilica located in Hautes-Pyrénées, in France

Basilica of Our Lady of the Rosary of Lourdes Notre Dame du Rosaire de Lourdes (in French)
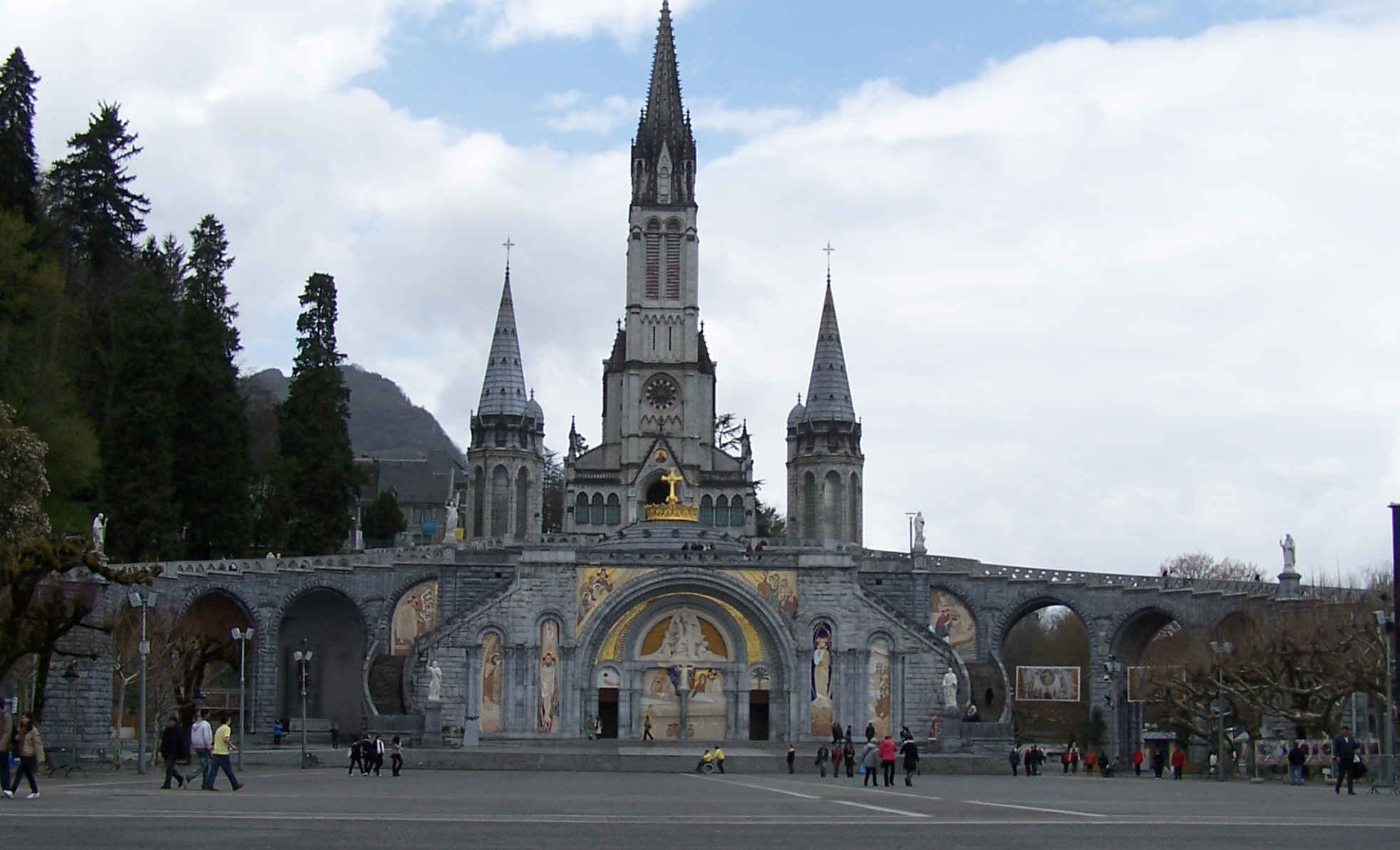
- The Rosary Basilica from across Rosary Square. Note the modified façade.

Religion
- Affiliation: Roman Catholic
- Ecclesiastical or organisational status: Minor basilica
- Year consecrated: 1901

Location
- Location: (France) Lourdes
- Interactive map of Basilica of Our Lady of the Rosary of Lourdes; Notre Dame du Rosaire de Lourdes (in French)
- Coordinates: 43°05′51″N 00°03′27″W

Architecture
- Architect: Leopold Hardy
- Type: Church
- Style: Neo-Byzantine
- Groundbreaking: 1883
- Completed: 1889

Specifications
- Direction of façade: E
- Capacity: 1500
- Length: 55 metres (180 ft)
- Width: 50 metres (160 ft)

Website
- Official website

The Basilica of Our Lady of the Rosary (French: Notre Dame du Rosaire de Lourdes) is a Catholic church and minor basilica within the Sanctuary of Our Lady of Lourdes in France. Its main theme is a celebration and depiction of the Rosary.

== History ==
The Rosary Basilica is the third of the churches to be completed on the site (after the Crypt and the Upper Basilica). It was designed by architect Leopold Hardy and completed in 1899. It was consecrated in 1901 and has a capacity of 1,500 worshippers. Its style is influenced by Byzantine architecture.

In 2006-7 the interior and exterior of the basilica were extensively renovated and the mosaics (many of which were deteriorating) were restored.

== Nave ==
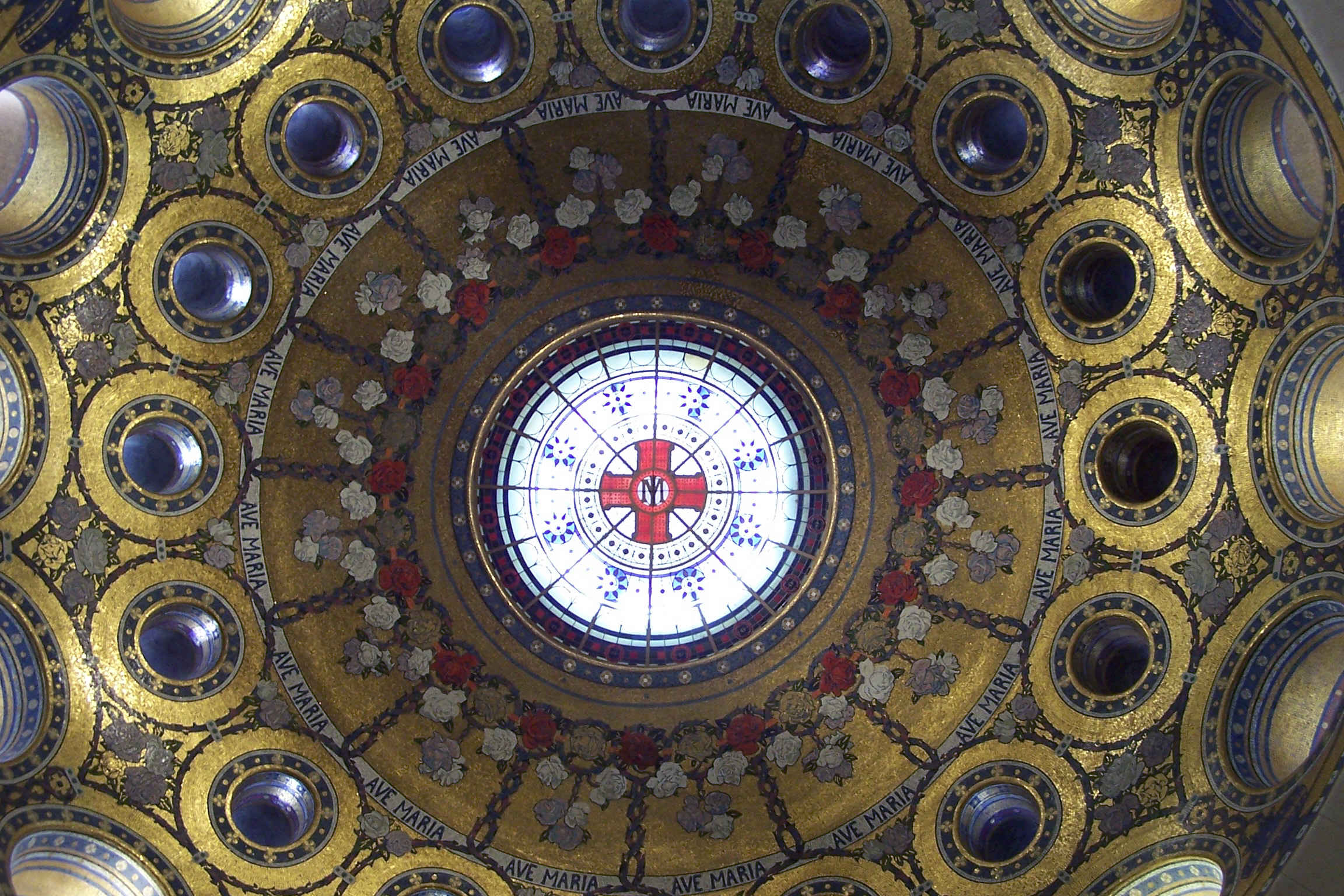
Interior view of the dome

The nave is open and circular, surmounted by a dome. The dome contains sixteen circular stained glass windows. The fifteen spaces between these windows signify the fifteen decades of the traditional rosary.

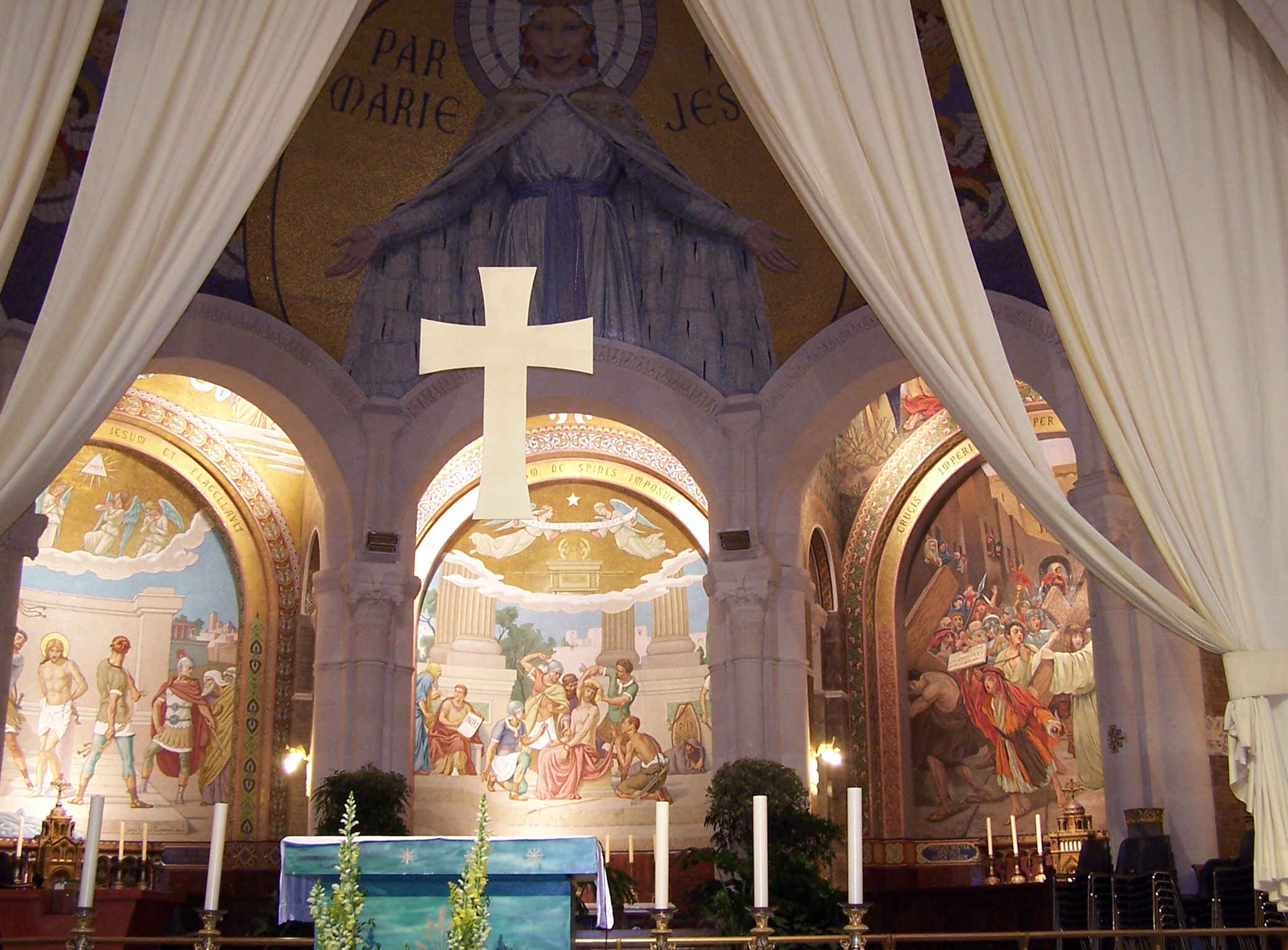
The sanctuary of the basilica looking towards the Sorrowful Mysteries

The nave is surrounded by fifteen smaller side chapels, one for each of the traditional Mysteries of the Rosary. On the left of the nave are found the Joyful Mysteries; in the centre behind the sanctuary are the Sorrowful Mysteries, and to the right are the Glorious Mysteries.

Each side-chapel comprises a large mosaic with a central image depicting the theme of that Mystery, and an inscription in Latin. Incorporated within the larger image may be smaller images of related themes. For example, the side chapel directly behind the altar contains a depiction of the Crowning with Thorns, which is surmounted by an image of the Ark of the Covenant (see figure).

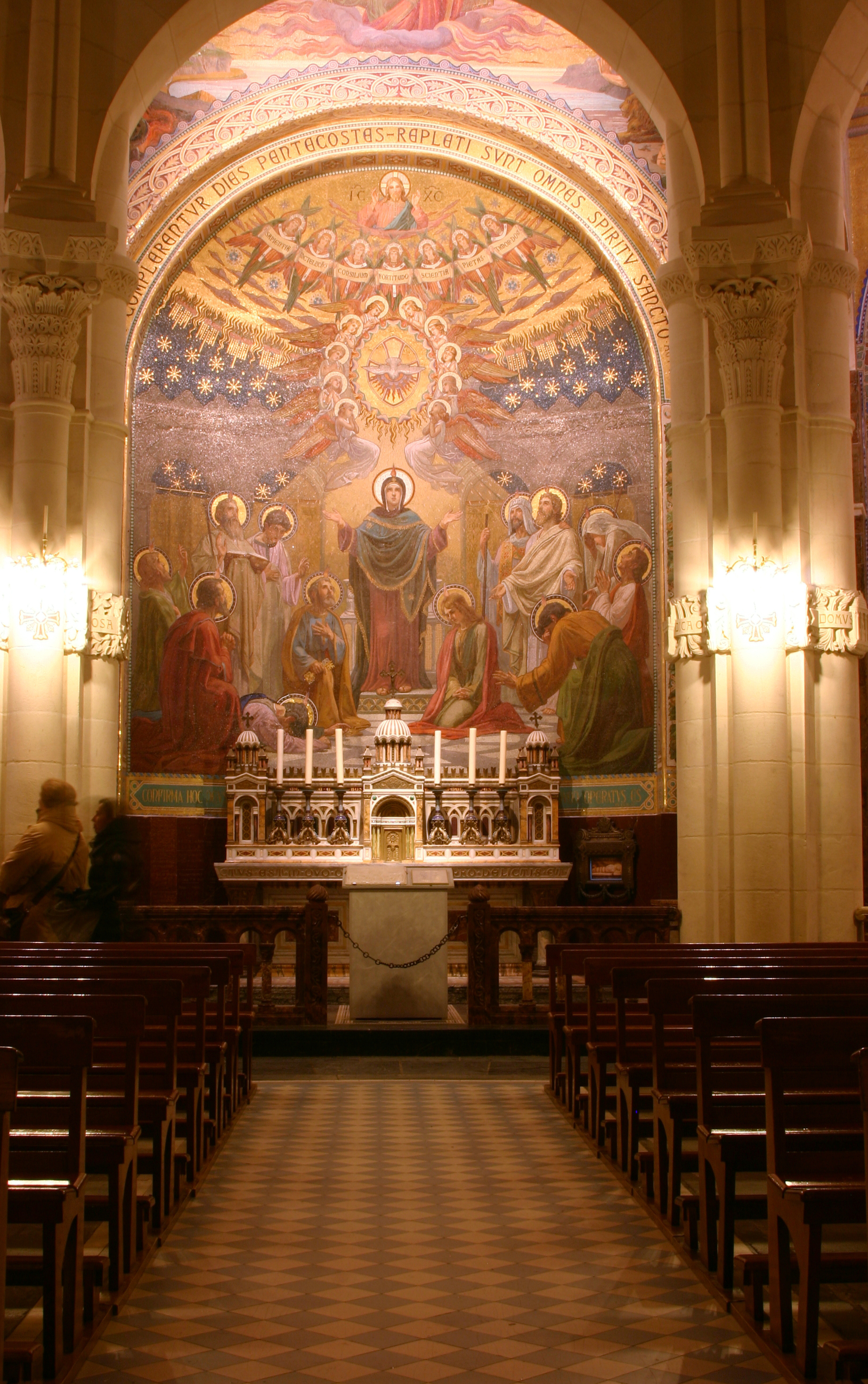
Detail of a side chapel mosaic depicting the Pentecost

Most of the mosaics bear a date of around 1900. In each side-chapel is a small altar bearing six candles.

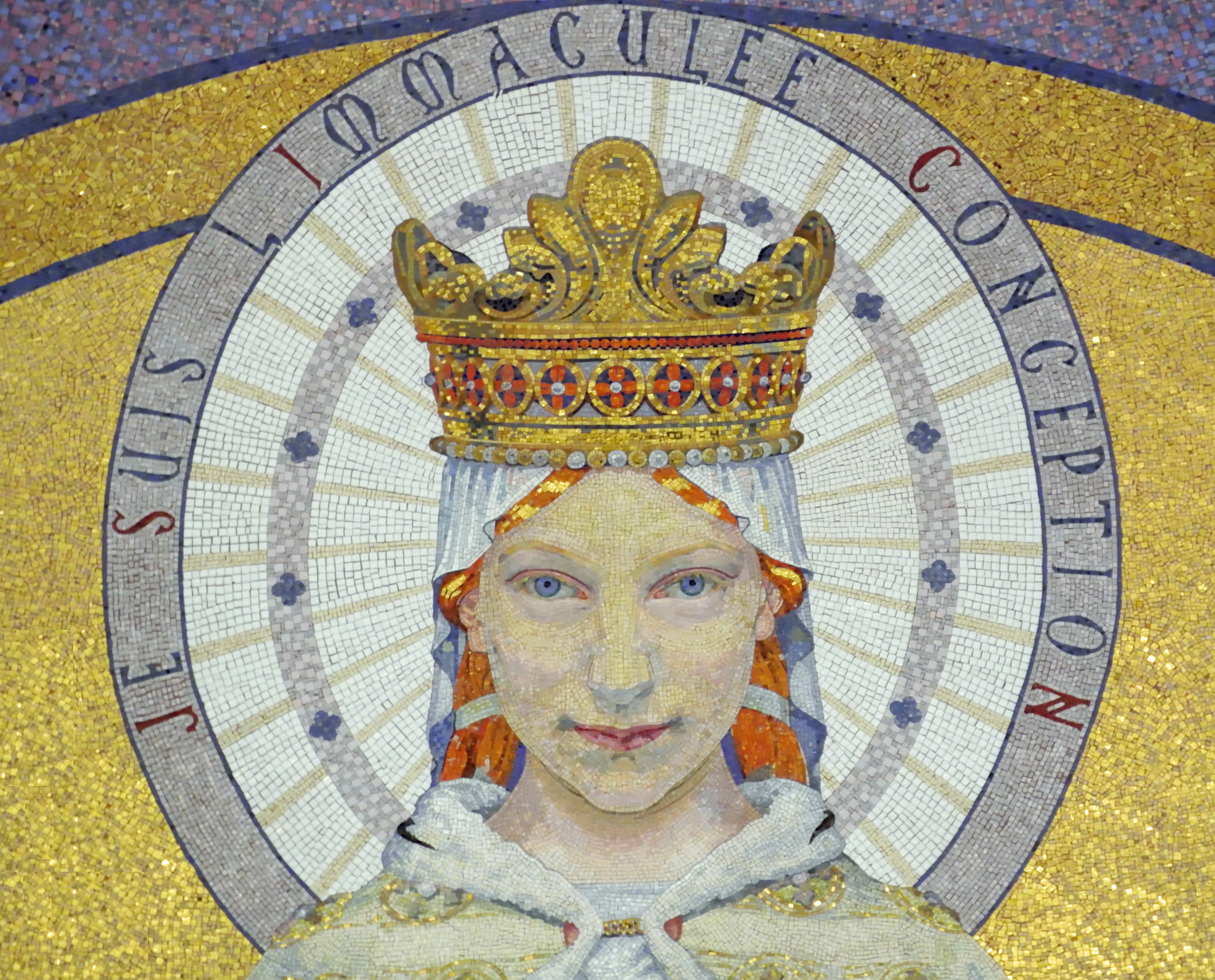
Mosaic depicting the Virgin Mary

In the upper wall of the sanctuary is a mosaic depicting Mary with outstretched arms and the caption Par Marie à Jésus ("Through Mary to Jesus"). This depiction, of a very young woman facing directly forwards, is much more in keeping with Bernadette's descriptions of the apparition than the iconic statue in the niche in the Grotto.

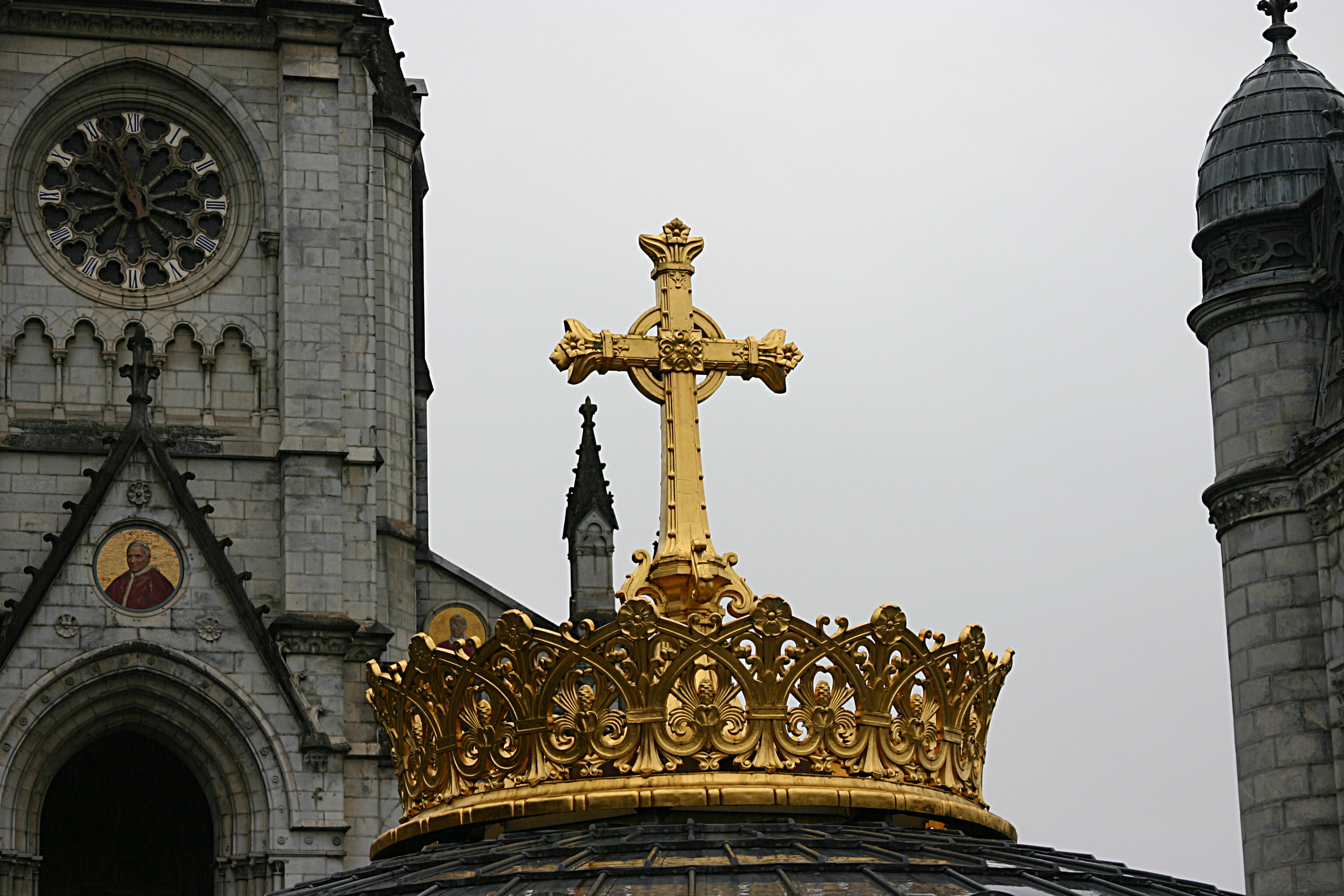
The gilded crown and cross surmounting the dome

The exterior of the dome is surmounted by a dramatic gilded crown and cross, which were a gift from the People of Ireland in 1924. The cross was regilded in 2000–2.

== Façade ==
The Rosary basilica has a semicircular white marble entry facade, depicting Mary handing the Rosary to St. Dominic.

In 1941, the white marble side doors of the basilica were engraved with a message of gratitude to Marshal Philippe Pétain, who visited Lourdes in 1941 and allowed the Church to reclaim ownership of the Domain. In translation, this inscription read:

In memoriam 1940-41, on the morrow of our disasters, France is trying to rediscover her soul under the government of Maréchal Pétain.

The exterior facade of the basilica has been modified in 2007 to include mosaics depicting the Luminous Mysteries, which were added to the traditional fifteen mysteries by Pope John Paul II in 2002.

== See also ==
- Roman Catholic Marian churches
- Our Lady of Lourdes
- Lourdes apparitions
- Bernadette Soubirous
