= Sisters of Charity of Nevers =

Catholic religious congregation of women in France

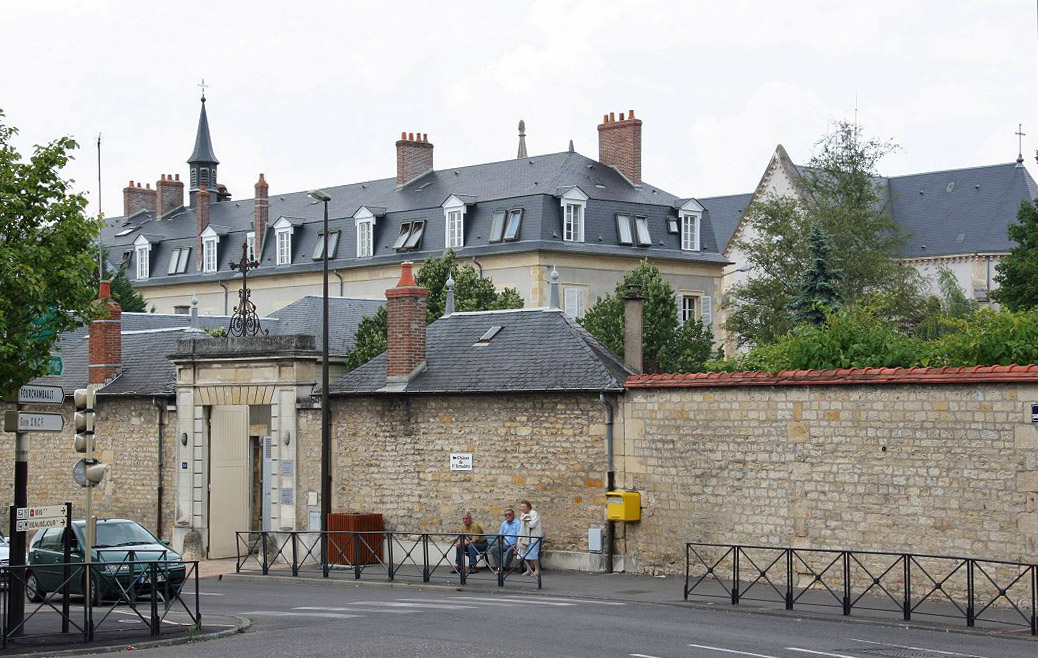
- The motherhouse at Nevers

Founder
- Jean-Baptiste Delaveyne, 1680; 346 years ago

Religions
- Roman Catholicism

The Sisters of Charity of Nevers (French: Congrégation des Sœurs de la Charité de Nevers), formally known as the Sisters of Charity and Christian Instruction, is a Catholic religious congregation of women founded in 1680 in Nevers, Nièvre department, France, at the instigation of Jean-Baptiste Delaveyne. The former motherhouse, originally the Priory of St. Gildard in Nevers, is now a space for pilgrims who wish to learn about Bernadette Soubirous, the saint and mystic of Lourdes who was a member of the congregation and is called the Espace Bernadette. It is built on the ruins of the priory, and was supervised by the bishop of the Diocese of Nevers.

== History ==
In 1678, Jean-Baptiste Delaveyne (1653–1719), a Benedictine who had spent seven years being dazzled by the court of Louis XIV, returned to Saint-Saulge, the hamlet in the Nièvre department where he was born, in an attempt to regain the spiritual direction of his youth. Struck by the poverty he found in that rural area, he offered the young ladies of the village of Saint-Saulge a challenge: "Have no other business but that of charity. Have no other interests but those of the unfortunate." This challenge led to the congregation's foundation. Delaveyne organized a small house with Sisters who ministered to the sick and the poor.

The congregation was housed in Château-Chinon in 1706. In 1710 they moved to Decize to serve in the local hospital, and in 1716 they consecrated a chapel in Saint-Saulge to the Immaculate Conception. In 1748 they returned to Château-Chinon, to its hospital. While the Sisters initially ministered to the poor, during the nineteenth century they were more oriented toward the middle classes (and most of the novices were middle-class girls), and by the 1860s operated 260 convents in France.

In 1853, the Sisters were given the former Church of Saint Lupus and Saint Gildard in Nevers by Dominique-Augustin Dufêtre, bishop of Nevers, to build a religious house; it was officially consecrated on 15 July 1856.

== Notable sisters ==
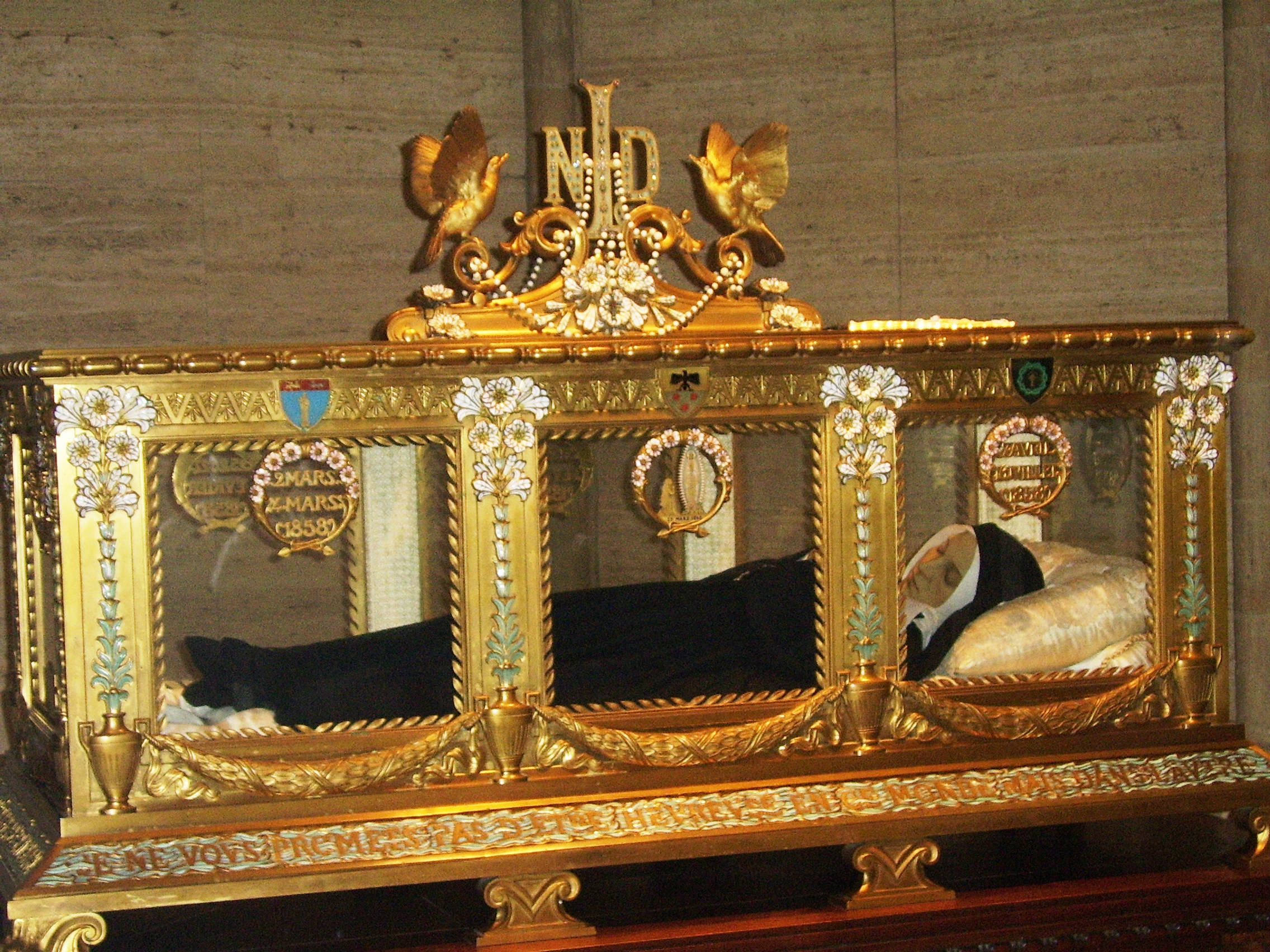
The sarcophagus of Saint Bernadette of Lourdes

The Catholic convent is best known for Bernadette Soubirous, also known as Saint Bernadette of Lourdes, a sister in the motherhouse at Nevers; after having received her visions, Bernadette entered the convent in Lourdes run by the sisters, who had opened a hospice in Lourdes in 1834. In 1866, she was accepted to take her novitiate in Nevers, where she died in 1879. Her body is enshrined in the St. Gildard Convent's chapel in Nevers. Today, the Sisters also tend the cachot, the basement apartment in Lourdes where Soubirous lived during her youth; in 2008, the Sisters received Pope Benedict XVI in the cachot, before he visited the grotto in Lourdes.

Another notable Sister was Marcelline Pauper, born 1663, who entered at Nevers at age twenty-two. Her autobiography was published in 1871; in it, she described how she made reparations for a sacrilege that had occurred in the chapel by receiving the stigmata, on 26 April 1702.

== Establishments ==
A daughter organization of the Daughters of Charity of Saint Vincent de Paul, the Sisters of Charity of Nevers operate hospitals and had convents and schools throughout France. The Sisters are active in Asia, Africa, and South America. It also operates:

- Sainte-Anne, a retirement home in Luc-la-Primaube, Aveyron, France
- Retirement home and home for handicapped children (Auxerre), homeless shelter (Sens), in the Roman Catholic Archdiocese of Sens, Yonne, France
