= Gilles Spifame =

French prelate (died 1578)

Gilles Spifame de Brou, died April 7, 1578, in Paris, was a French prelate of the 16th century.

Gilles Spifame de Brou was the son of Gaillard Spifame, treasurer general of France, and Anne of Marie, as well as the nephew of Jacques Spifame de Brou, bishop of Nevers, whom he succeeds when Jacques converted to the Protestant Calvinists.

Gilles Spifame was a canon and official of Nevers with the title of vicar general, dean of Saint-Marcel of Paris, provost of Chablis, abbot of the abbey Saint-Paul-sur-Vanne and dean of Sens.

He was appointed bishop of Nevers in 1559. Gilles made every effort to stop, as soon as he arrived, the progress of Protestantism in his diocese. After having attended the last sessions of the Council of Trent in 1563, this prelate publicly burned in 1566 three tons of suspicious books sent from Geneva, which Protestants had introduced into Nevers. In 1572 he allowed the Fathers of the Society of Jesus to establish themselves in his episcopal city.
