= Gildard =

Gildard, or Gildardus, is the name of two Frankish saints:

- Saint Gildard, fifth/sixth-century saint and Bishop of Rouen
- Saint Gildard (Lurcy-le-Bourg), seventh-century saint and priest of Lurcy-le-Bourg
- Thomas Gildard, 19th-century Scottish architect and author
