= Pierre Imans =

French mannequin designer

Pierre Imans was a French mannequin designer.

Imans began producing mannequins in 1896. They were made of wax in an unconventional, naturalistic style.

He remade the wax face of Bernadette of Lourdes.
