= Espace Bernadette Soubirous Nevers =

Church in Nièvre, France

Coordinates: 46.9923°N 3.1519°E

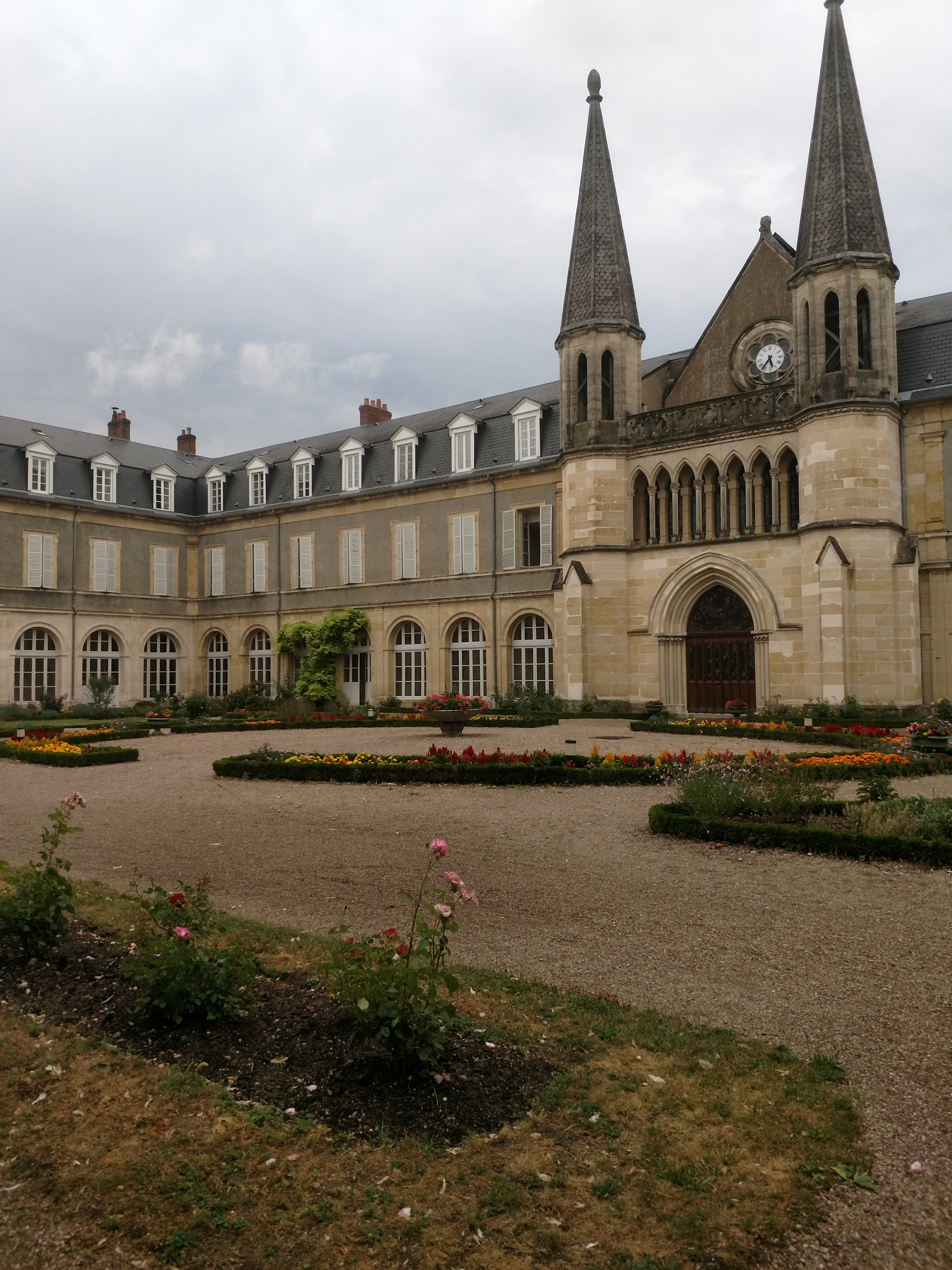
View of the garden and façade of the cloister.

Espace Bernadette Soubirous Nevers is a former convent and the motherhouse of the Sisters of Charity of Nevers in Nevers, France, and is where the body of Saint Bernadette Soubirous is enshrined. In 1970, it was converted into a sanctuary run by volunteers and a few sisters who tend to pilgrims and manage the complex.

== History ==
In 1853, Dominique-Augustin Dufêtre, bishop of Nevers, assigned the Church of Saint Lupus and Saint Gildard in Nevers to be rebuilt as a religious house for the Sisters of Charity of Nevers. By that time, not much was left but a rectangular building; the remains of the thirteenth-century building were used to build the Saint Gildard Convent, which was officially consecrated on 15 July 1856. It became the motherhouse of the Sisters of Charity of Nevers, where in 1866, Bernadette Soubirous entered for her novitiate following the apparitions of Our Lady of Lourdes, and where she died on 16 April 1879. Her body was initially buried in a special crypt, separate from the graves of other sisters.

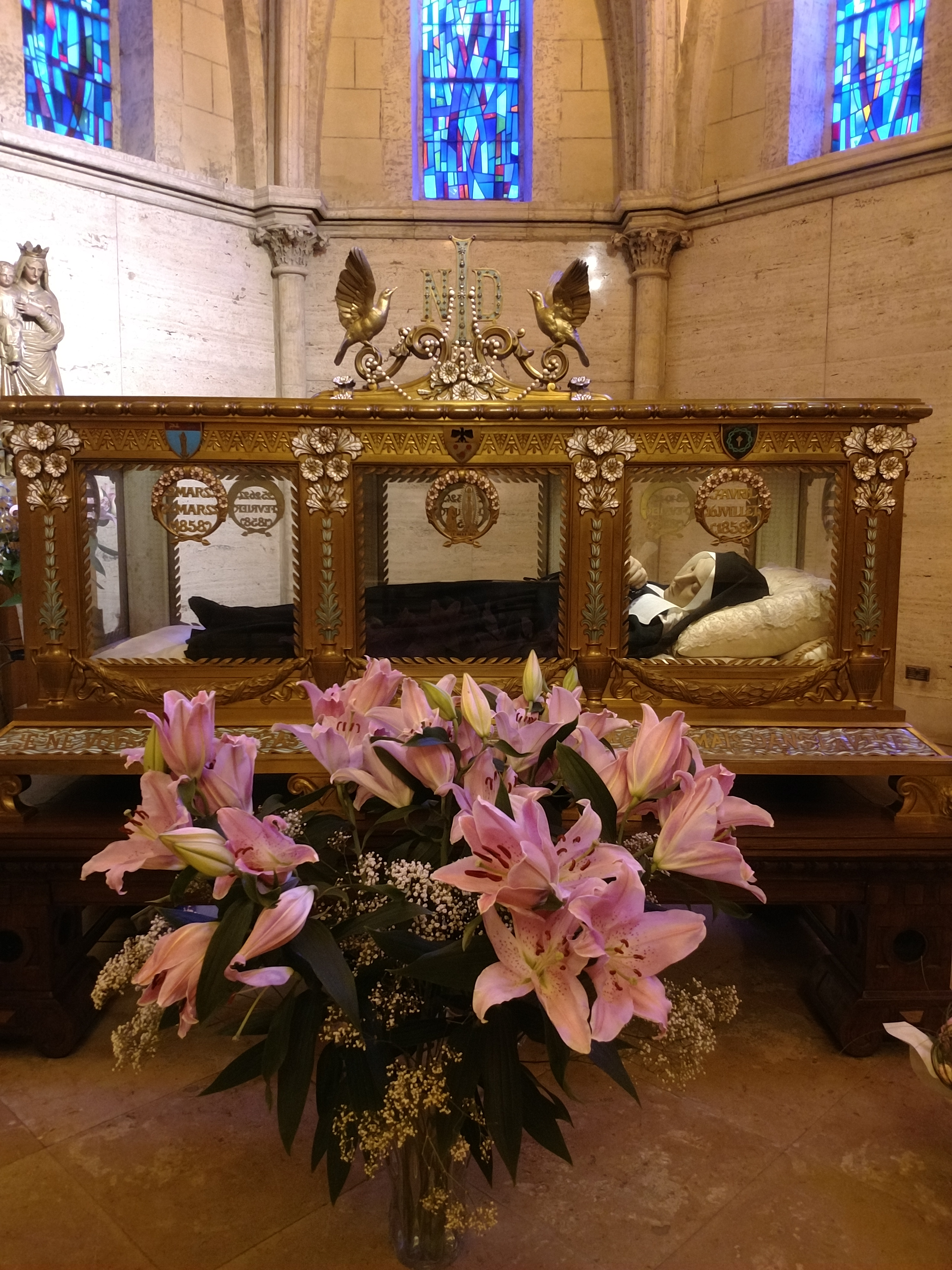
The gold sarcophagus/reliquary containing the incorrupt body of Saint Bernadette Soubirous.

In 1970, the convent was changed into a sanctuary and now the cells are used as hotel rooms. The chapel was also significantly transformed, changing its Tridentine altar into a freestanding, plain Novus ordo altar following the Second Vatican Council, with the tabernacle moved to a side altar. Saint Bernadette's glass sarcophagus lies to the right of the main altar.

== Facilities ==
The convent was transformed into a sanctuary, which significantly changed the interior. The monastic cells of the nuns became lodging rooms for pilgrims, the cloister and its huge glass windows overlooking the flowerbeds. Its sunlit corridors lead to lounges, reading rooms, conference rooms, and dining rooms, as well as multipurpose rooms with professional equipment for up to 250 people. Located in a unique setting in the town centre, Espace Bernadette provides accommodation for up to 200 guests, in bedrooms on the first and second floors.

The novitiate room was converted into a chapel, and is where in July 1866, Bernadette in her traditional Pyrenean garb recounted the apparitions for the last time to 300 Sisters. The infirmary, where Bernadette died at the age of 35, is now the Holy Cross Oratory. During her 13 years at Saint Gildard, she served as assistant nurse, head nurse and sacristan during which time she was often ill. Additionally, food is served in the dining rooms seven days a week, where up to 200 people can be catered for daily.

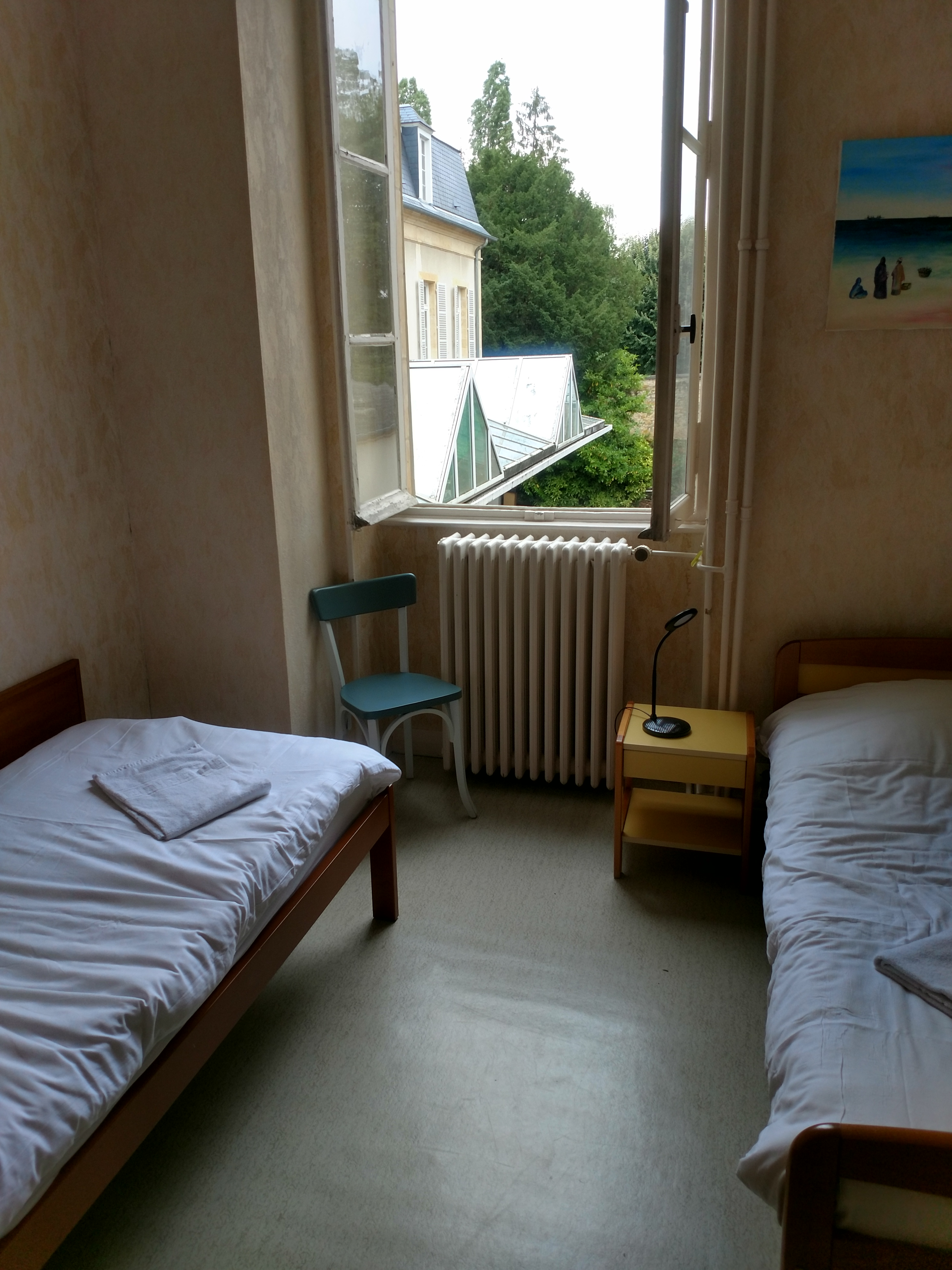
Sleeping accommodations at Espace Bernadette, formerly the rooms of nuns when the building was a convent.

== Museum ==
In 1958, the Sisters of Charity built a museum to teach pilgrims about the life of Saint Bernadette, especially her sufferings. The museum highlights various key places in Saint Bernadette’s life: the village dungeon her family lived in, the Grotto of Massabielle, the Hospice of Lourdes, and the convent at Nevers. Photographs and artefacts on display also help visitors understand her daily life.

== Bernadette's Chapel ==
Bernadette’s body, when exhumed for the process of beatification, was found to be incorrupt to the surprise of those present.

On 3 August 1925, following her beatification by Pope Pius XI, Bernadette’s body was moved to a glass reliquary in the convent chapel. Built on the ruins of Saint Gildard’s Abbey, the simple and bright chapel was consecrated in 1856 when the community of the Sisters of Charity of Nevers moved into the building, and later changed its name to Bernadette's Chapel when the convent was converted into a sanctuary.

== Grotto ==
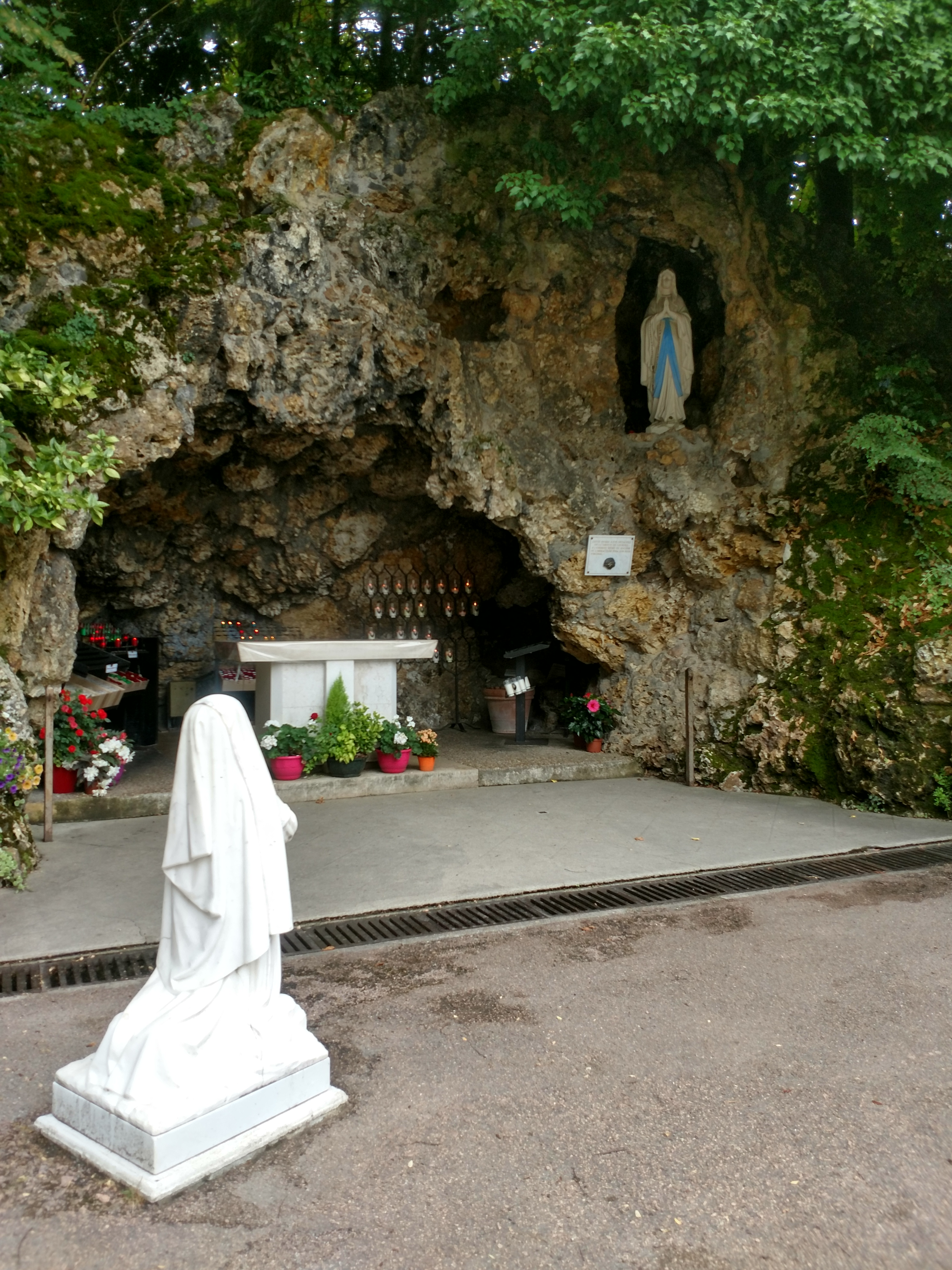
A replica of the grotto at Lourdes, with a statue of a younger Bernadette kneeling as she would during the apparitions.

A replica of the Grotto at Massabielle was created in 1884, five years after Bernadette’s death, as demanded by Marie-Thérèse Vauzou, the mother superior of the convent who was also Bernadette’s mistress of novices. It was built to resemble the Grotto in Lourdes as it would have looked in 1858, and it carries a piece of the rock the Virgin Mary stood on in the upper alcove. The Grotto also has an altar and a rack where pilgrims may light and offer candles with an image of Saint Bernadette, sold on site.

== Saint Joseph's Chapel ==
Bernadette was interred in Saint Joseph's Chapel for 40 years. The chapel is located in the middle of the sanctuary gardens, at the end of an avenue lined with lime trees. This chapel retains its Tridentine altar, unlike the main, former conventual chapel. A stained image of Our Lady of Lourdes shines above the altar, while nearby is a statue of Our Lady of the Waters. The paths which cross the large gardens lead to this statue in front of which Saint Bernadette often prayed. She would say: “It is she who reminds me most of the Lady I saw.”
