= Saint Gildard (Lurcy-le-Bourg) =

- Died: Lurcy-le-Bourg
- Venerated in: Roman Catholic Church
- Major shrine: Espace Bernadette, Sisters of Charity of Nevers, Nevers
- Feast: 24 August; 31 August

Gildard, or Gildardus, was a French Catholic priest in seventh-century Lurcy-le-Bourg, in the Diocese of Nevers. He was the namesake of the Convent of St. Gildard; it has since become Espace Bernadette, operated by the Sisters of Charity of Nevers, and is the final resting place of Bernadette Soubirous.

== History ==
The Bollandists have little to say on Gildard—he was a priest in the seventh century who "edified with his virtues the parish of Lurcy-le-Bourg." Local historians agree that little is known of Gildard and repeat what was written in Les Petits Bollandistes. The date of his death was 24 August, but because that day was already dedicated to Saint Bartholomew Gildard's feast day was moved to 31 August, and was celebrated on that day for three centuries, until in the Nevers area it was moved back to 24 August, according to Augustin-Joseph Crosnier, vicar-general of the Diocese of Nevers in the mid-nineteenth century. Crosnies also reports that an ancient ceremony directs that the celebration is to be accompanied with wine and warm bread rolls.

Gildard's body was buried in a small church dedicated to a Saint Loup (known by the Latinised name of Saint Lupus), outside the city walls of Nevers. In the course of time, after miracles had occurred, the church came to be called after both saints, and later again the name of Lupus was forgotten.

== Church of St. Lupus and St. Gildard ==
Less is known of Lupus than of Gildard, though at least some historians believe that a Lupus had lived in the area and that some miracles were performed at the church that came to bear his name, which he later shared with Gildard. In the time of Charles the Bald and Charles the Fat, it was an abbey, and in the eleventh century became a parish church; by the end of that century it was left to the monastery of Saint-Laurent-l'Abbaye.

The church suffered greatly during the Hundred Years' War, and the parish became so depopulated that the church was empty; in 1784 it was closed at the request of the local population. By the mid-nineteenth century, a wine press was in operation in two of the church bays, while the grounds were overgrown with vines.
