= Jean-Baptiste Delaveyne =

Venerable Jean-Baptiste Delaveyne O.S.B.
- Born: September 11, 1653; Saint-Saulge, Nivernais
- Died: June 5, 1719; Nevers, France
- Venerated in: Catholic Church

Dom Jean-Baptiste Delaveyne, O.S.B., (1653-1719) was a French Benedictine monk and priest, who founded the Sisters of Charity of Nevers which continues to serve throughout the world.

== Life ==
Delaveyne was born to a wealthy family in the village of Saint-Saulge in 1653, in the ancient province of Nivernais. In 1667, through the influence of his maternal uncle, he receives the benefice of sub-prior at Saint-Saulge. He studied at the Jesuit college of Nevers, then continued his education in the city of Autun. After studying with the Society of Jesus, in 1669 he entered the Abbey of St. Martin in that city, at about the age of 16. He was soon sent to Paris, spending the following seven years studying there. He made his religious profession there in 1669 and went to the Sorbonne to complete his training. While there, he was drawn into the artistic and literary circles of the elite of Parisian society. After his ordination in 1676, he was sent to his hometown to serve as its pastor, continuing to lead a life mostly focused on the intellectual pursuits of the literary life.

The Benedictine priory of Saint-Saulge being in a deplorable material state, Delaveyne settled comfortably with his parents and led “a life more worldly than religious”. Two years later, a chance remark by the pastor of a neighboring village contrasting his way of life to that of St. Benedict re-ignited the religious fervor of Delaveyne's youth. He returned to his monastery in Autun for a spiritual retreat, in order to find again the focus of his life. From this experience he returned to his parish a changed man.

In his re-found religious mindset, Delaveyne began to see the misery of the poor of the parish, especially those in the countryside. He started to work to relieve their physical as well as their spiritual needs.

Out of these efforts, in 1680 Delaveyne invited a group of young women of the parish to organize to care for the needs of women and children. He advised them:

N'ayez point d'autres affaires que celles de la Charité. N'ayez point d'autres intérêts que ceux des malheureux.
(You shall not have any concerns other than those of Charity. You shall not have any interests other than those of the unfortunate.)

In this way, Delaveyne founded the religious congregation of the Sisters of Charity of Nevers, which has operated hundred of convents and schools throughout France since its founding, with its motherhouse still in Nevers. He wrote a rule including the life of prayer and the practice of charity and ensured their skills by sending them to train with other nuns and then with doctors from Nevers. In 1683, at the request of the local pastor, the sisters went to Nevers; there, the first sisters received the habit and made private vows. In 1685, the headquarters of the congregation moved to Nevers; the founder, required by his function to reside in Saint-Saulge, fades away a little, but his influence is present in the rule of the Congregation of the Sisters of Charity approved by the Bishop of Nevers in 1698 and 1700. The most famous member of the congregation is St. Bernadette Soubirous, the visionary of Lourdes.

Delaveyne died in Nevers in 1719, and was buried in the church of Saint-Saulge. He was declared Venerable by Pope John Paul II on May 14, 1991. There is an exhibition regarding his life in the parish Church of St. Paul in Saint-Saulge.
