= Raoul Spifame =

French esoteric scholar and legal reformist (c.1500 – 1563)

- Born: c. 1500; France
- Died: 1563; France
- Occupations: Lawyer, esoteric scholar
- Known for: Pseudo-royal decrees signed as Henry II, proposals for radical legal and civic reforms

Raoul Spifame (c.1500 – 1563) was a French esoteric scholar and legal reformist. He styled himself "dictateur et garde du sceau impérial et royal" ("Dictator and Guard of the Imperial and Royal Seal").

Born to a noble family originally from Lucca, one of his brothers, Jacques-Paul, a Calvinist, was decapitated in Geneva on 23 March 1566, and his other brother, Martin Spifame, published a collection of religious poetry in 1583. The family died out with Jean Spifame, seigneur des Granges, who died in 1643. Raoul was the nephew of Gaillard Spifame, magistrate and later Provost of the Merchants of Paris (son of Jean Spifame, seigneur de Passy, secretary of King Henry II, and of Jacquette Ruzé), whose grandson Jean, counsellor at the parlement of Paris, would later also convert to Calvinism and take refuge in Geneva.

Originally practicing as a lawyer, Raoul sank slowly into madness (after various legal problems involving his relatives, and an encounter with the future King Henry II), until he believed himself to be King Henry. During his time in a mental asylum, he wrote "royal" decrees signed "Henri II," a practice which earned him an enduring legacy. Some of these decrees propose very radical reforms, such as the suppression of the feudal courts; others concern the cleanliness and decoration of the cities and the reform of the calendar.

The French writer Gérard de Nerval devotes a chapter of Les Illuminés to Spifame's story. For Nerval, this was part of a lifelong esotericist interest in doppelgängers.
