= Marcelline Pauper =

Marcelline Pauper (born 1663) was one of the Sisters of Charity of Nevers. She asked to receive the stigmata as repayment for a sacrilege committed at the Sister's chapel, and received them on 26 April 1702.

Pauper's autobiography was not published until 1871.
