= François Deniau =

French Roman Catholic bishop (1936-2014)

Francis Deniau
- Bishop of Nevers
- Church: Roman Catholic Church
- See: Diocese of Nevers

Orders
- Ordination: 29 June 1961
- Consecration: 4 October 1998

Personal details
- Born: François Joseph Pierre Deniau; 3 October 1936 Neuilly-sur-Seine, France
- Died: 12 January 2014 (aged 77) France

François Joseph Pierre Deniau (3 October 1936 – 12 January 2014) was a French Roman Catholic bishop.

François Deniau was born on 3 October 1936. He was ordained a priest of the Archdiocese of Paris on 29 June 1961.

Pope John Paul II named him bishop of Nevers on 26 June 1998. He received his episcopal consecration on 4 October.

Pope Benedict XVI accepted his resignation on 27 August 2011.

He died on 12 January 2014.
