= Patrice Flynn =

Patrice Flynn (15 August 1874 – 13 October 1970), was Bishop of Nevers.

== Biography ==
Born in Paris to Irish parents (his father was from County Cork, his mother a Ms. Curran from Portaferry, County Down), Flynn was schooled at Douai and taught maths in Paris. Both he and his older brother Henri were ordained in Paris.

Serving in the French army during World War I, "he spent two years as a hospital attendant before volunteering as chaplain to the 33rd Infantry Division that was fighting at the front. He served at a number of the places whose name has entered the collective memory and is intimately associated with the worst of the war – Verdun, Arras, Vimy Ridge and Ypres. He attained the rank of captain before being demobilised in March 1919."

In October 1916, Flynn was a member of a French government propaganda mission to Ireland in order to counteract perceived 'hearts and minds' German propaganda (other missions went to Canada, Spain, the USA).

Appointed Bishop of Nevers on 16 August 1932 in Notre Dame Cathedral, it was "attended by Count O’Kelly, the Irish envoy to France [and] many Irish people who lived in the city, as well as priests from the Irish College in Paris. The Irish expatriate community gathered funds to buy vestments for the new bishop, to which two shamrocks were added to represent his Irish heritage." During his episcopate he brought a number of Irish priests to his diocese, and in 1940 brought the Legion of Mary to France with the aid of Veronica O'Brien.

He retired on 17 December 1963, becoming the titular Bishop of Arneae. He died in 1970.

== See also ==
- Roman Catholic Diocese of Nevers
