= Tauricianus =

Second bishop of the Roman Catholic Diocese of Nevers

Tauricianus was the second bishop of the Roman Catholic Diocese of Nevers. The same Tauricianus was among the bishop of Nevers listed by Demochares in the book of the du divin Sacrifice de la Mefle.

Taurianus was said by Rufticus, to have ruled his bishopric in the time of Pope Vigilius and Childebert King of France about the year of the Lord 538.

He attended the council, held at Epone in 517. There he signed the deeds of the council with Tauricianus civitatis Nivemensis episcopus, relegiet subscripsi.
