= Euladius of Nevers =

6th-century Frankish bishop

Euladius of Nevers was a Pre-congregational saint and first bishop of the Diocese of Nevers in France.

He lived during the rule of Clovis I and is reputed to have cured Clovis of a two-year long illness in 506.
