= Jacques Spifame =

French government official and prelate (1502–1566)

Coat of arms Jean-Paul & Gilles Spifame

Jacques-Paul Spifame de Brou, born in Paris in 1502 and died in Geneva on 25 March 1566, was a French government official, who became a cleric, a prelate, and a bishop, and then converted to Calvinism in 1558. He fled to Geneva, where he became a protege of John Calvin and Theodore de Bèze, and a diplomat in the Protestant cause, but who was tried and executed in 1566 on a charge of adultery, perjury, and forgery.

== Family ==
Jacques-Paul Spifame de Brou was the son of Jean, lord of Passy and Bisseaux, secretary of the king, treasurer of the Extraordinaire des Guerres, and his wife Jacquette Ruzé. His family was from Lombardy, but emigrated to France from Lucca. His brother Raoul Spifame was an esoteric scholar, and another brother, Martin, published in 1583 a collection of spiritual poems.

== Catholic career ==
Jacques Spifame studied at Paris and at Orléans, and held the degree of Juris Utriusque Doctor. He was at first regent at the college of Cardinal Le Moine. He was serving as Procuraor of the Gallic Nation in the University of Paris, when, on 10 October 1522, he was elected Universitatis Rector; he served until 17 December 1522. On 16 March 1533, he became canon of Notre-Dame de Paris and Chancellor of the Church of Paris and of the university. As Chancellor, he took particular interest in the reformation of the statutes of the colleges: the collège d'Autun in 1543, the collège de Narbonne in 1544, and the collège du Cardinal-Lemoine in 1545.

He was prosecutor of France, maître des comptes at Montpellier (1527–1529), and councilor in the Parlement from 1529. He became Président de la Petite Chambre des Enquêtes in 1544.

He accumulated benefices, including: Provost of Chablis, dean of Saint-Marcel de Paris and Gassicourt, and first abbot commendatory of the abbey of Saint-Paul-sur-Vanne in Sens in 1531, whose archives he destroyed in 1558.

In 1538, he was sent by King Francis I as ambassador to Pope Paul III, and the university placed its curial business in his hands.

In 1544, he was appointed vicar general of Charles de Guise-Lorraine, archbishop of Reims, who had been appointed archbishop by King Francis at the age of 14 in 1538. The archbishop was not consecrated a bishop until 8 February 1545, at the age of 19.

Nominated by King Francis I of France, Spifame was appointed bishop of Nevers on 5 May 1546, by Pope Paul III. In 1547 and 1548, he attended the Council of Trent in Bologna as a canonist. After his return to France, he lived in Nevers until he was appointed Maître des Requêtes in 1556, whereupon he moved back to Paris.

In Paris, he became a member of the privy council of Catherine de Medici, the queen-mother. He participated in the Estates-General of Blois in September and October 1558.

== Protestant Career ==
From the time of the Estates General, held in Blois in 1558, he favored the preaching of the doctrines of John Calvin.

Before he quit France for Geneva, he resigned his benefices, not just the diocese of Nevers, but also the abbey of Saint-Paul-de-Sens and his canonry in Nôtre-Dame-de-Paris.

In April 1559, Jacques Spifame arrived in Geneva, and on 17 April he appeared before the magistrates and Council, which granted him residence status. He took the name of Passy, after his family's fief. He had lived for a long time in the greatest intimacy with Catherine de Gasperne, widow of Étienne le Hail, prosecutor at the Châtelet, and he requested that the Council recognize and regularize his marital situation, and legitimize their two children, André and Anne. That, he was told, was a matter for the Congregation, not the council. The Congregation refused to deal with the matter until the arrival of Catherine de Gasperne, and so they appeared together on 27 April. Spifume stated that their marriage could not have been solemnized in France, due to his ecclesiastical state as a bishop. He did state, however, that he had a marriage contract, dated 1539, which he had placed in the hands of John Calvin.

Passy gained attention in Geneva for his manners, his wit and his knowledge. Made a minister by John Calvin himself, he was appointed, in 1561, pastor of the Protestant church of Issoudun. with the support of Theodore de Bèze, he was named a member of the Council of 200, and then of the Council of 60. Calvin sent him to Orléans after the Colloquy of Poissy to be with the Prince de Condé. During this time, he dared to celebrate a Protestant communion service in Bourges. In early 1562, he was named ambassador of the Huguenots to the Diet of Frankfort, for the inauguration of Frederick as King of the Romans.

In the early period after his arrival in Geneva, he married his mistress with whom he had a boy named André and a girl named Anne. Two years later, one of his nephews, Jean Spifame, having contested before the Parlement of Paris the legitimacy of these children's birth, Jacques made a false marriage certificate to win their case. At that time, Claude Servin, controller in the house of the Queen of Navarre, came to accuse him of certain malpractices and in the meantime, managed to be imprisoned with him.

He was put on trial on 22 March 1566 before the Syndics of Geneva, sitting as a criminal court. He was sentenced to death for adultery, falsification of documents, and other crimes, and was beheaded on 23 March 1566.

== Bibliography ==
- Delmas, André (1944). "Procès et mort de Jacques Spifame," (in French), in: Bibliothèque d'humanisme et Renaissance vol. 5 (1944), pp. 105–135.
- Du Boulay, Cesar (1673). Historia Universitatis Parisiensis Ipsius Fundationem, Nationes, Facultates, Magistratus, Decreta, Censuras & Ludicia in negotiis fidei, Privilegia, Comitia, Legationes, Reformationes. (in Latin). Volume 6. Paris: P. De Bresche 1673. P. 944.
- Ouvarov, Pavel.; Milles, E.; & Descimon, R. (2010), "La réconciliation manquée des Spifame: domination, transgression, reconversion (XVI^{e}–XVII^{e} siècle), (in French), in: Robert Descimon & Elie Haddad (edd.), Épreuves de noblesse: les expériences nobiliaires de la haute robe parisienne (XVI^{e}–XVIII^{e} siècle) (Paris: Société d'édition «Les belles lettres» 2010), pp. 87–105.
- Servin, Comte (1911). "Le Procès de Spifame," (in French), in: La revue de Paris vol. 14 (Paris: July 1, 1911), pp. 139–154.
