= Dominique-Augustin Dufêtre =

French bishop (1796–1860)

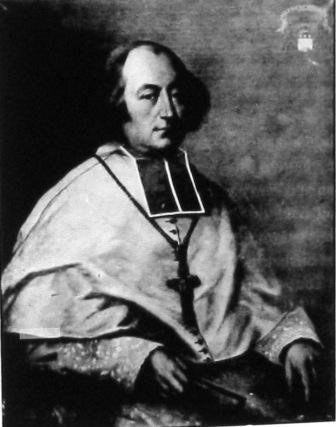

Dominique-Augustin Dufêtre (Lyon, 17 April 1796–Nevers, 6 November 1860) was the bishop of the Roman Catholic Diocese of Nevers from 1842 to 1860.

Born in Lyon, Dufêtre entered the seminary of Saint Irene and then entered the monastery of the Carthusians in Lyon, after which he preached throughout France at missions and ecclesiastical retreats. He was vicar general of Tours when he was appointed on 13 September 1842 as bishop of Nevers; he was ordained on 21 March 1843. His patron saint was Saint Dominic.
