= Diocese of Nevers =

Diocese of the Catholic Church

Coordinates: 46°59′14″N 3°09′26″E

Diocese of Nevers Dioecesis Nivernensis Diocèse de Nevers

Catholic
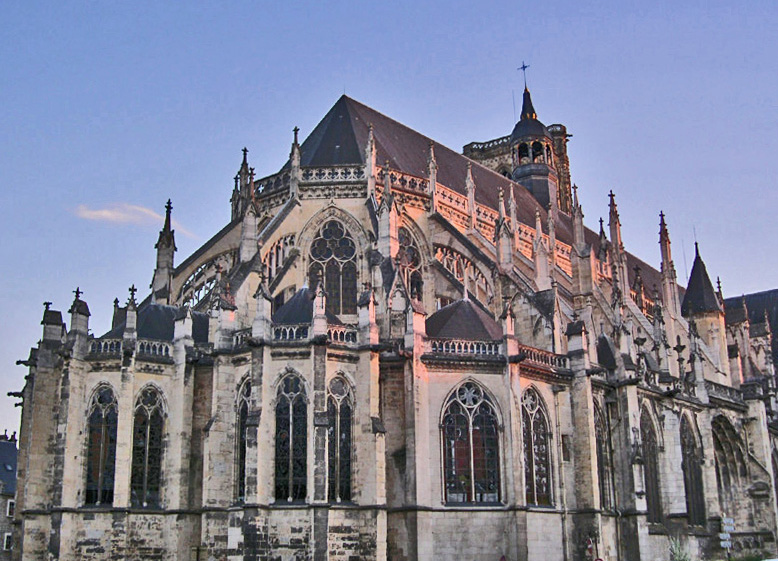
- Nevers Cathedral

- Coat of arms

Location
- Country: France
- Ecclesiastical province: Dijon
- Metropolitan: Archdiocese of Dijon

Statistics
- Area: 6,816 km^{2} (2,632 sq mi)
- Population: Total; Catholics: (as of 2021); 201,518; 143,420 (71.2%)
- Parishes: 45

Information
- Denomination: Roman Catholic
- Sui iuris church: Latin Church
- Rite: Roman Rite
- Established: 5th Century
- Cathedral: Cathedral of Saint Cyr and Saint Julitte in Nevers
- Patron saint: Cyricus and St. Julitta
- Secular priests: 37 (Diocesan); 7 (Religious Orders); 14 Permanent Deacons

Current leadership
- Pope: Leo XIV
- Bishop elect: Grégoire Drouot
- Metropolitan Archbishop: Antoine Hérouard
- Apostolic Administrator: Benoît Rivière
- Bishops emeritus: François Joseph Pierre Deniau

Map

Website
- Website of the Diocese

The Diocese of Nevers (Latin: Dioecesis Nivernensis; French: Diocèse de Nevers) is a Latin Church diocese of the Catholic Church in France. The diocese comprises the department of Nièvre, in the Region of Bourgogne.

Suppressed by the Concordat of 1801 and united to the See of Autun, it was re-established in 1823 as suffragan of the Archdiocese of Sens and took over a part of the former Diocese of Autun and a part of the ancient Diocese of Auxerre.

== History ==
The claim that Savinian and Potentian were the first to Christianize Nevers (Noviodunum) on instructions from the Apostle Peter c. 45 is not sustainable. The earliest signs of Christianity in the area date from the mid-3rd century.

At the beginning of the 5th century, Nevers became part of the kingdom of Burgundy. In 763, King Pepin the Short held a placitum generale for the Franks at Nevers, at which the Bavarian Duke Tassilo was present. In 952, Hugues le Blanc, Count of Paris, seized and burned the city of Nevers. In 960, King Lothair of France gave Burgundy, including the Nivernais, to Odo I, Duke of Burgundy, the son of Hugues. At some tme before 990, he gave Nevers and the Nivernais as a fief to Count Landri.

In 1194, Peter II of Courtenay, count of Nevers through his marriage to Countess Agnes, began to build the first set of walls around the city of Nevers. It was at the same time that the commune of Nevers was officially recognized.

=== Foundation of the diocese ===
The diocese of Nevers was established at the end of the 5th century. Three catalogues of bishops of Nevers are found, inserted into liturgical books, and dating from the 9th to 11th centuries.

The Gallia Christiana mentions Eladius as first Bishop of Nevers, who was restored to health by St. Severinus, Abbot of St. Maurice, in the reign of King Clovis I (481–509). The place of Euladius in the episcopal lists is, as Louis Duchesne indicated, uncertain; the first attested bishop is Tauricianus, who was present at the Council of Epaone in September 517.

=== Chapter and cathedral ===
In 802, Bishop Jerome (800–816) who had rebuilt the cathedral, dedicated it in honour of the martyrs Cyricus and Julitta; until then it had been dedicated to Saints Gervasius and Protasius. He had obtained the arm of Saint Cyricus (Cyr) from Bishop Aaron of Auxerre. The cathedral was reconstructed by Bishop Hugues de Champ-Allemand (1013–1065). In the early 13th century, a reconstruction was undertaken by Bishop Guillaume de Saint-Lazare (1204–1221), but this building seems to have suffered extensive damage or complete destruction by the fire of 1308. Another new cathedral was constructed, and dedicated by the Patriarch of Jerusalem, Pierre de La Palu, O.P., on 31 March 1331; the Bishop of Nevers, Bertrand Gascon (1322–1332) was ill and had delegated his episcopal powers to the Patriarch.

The cathedral was served and administered by a corporate body called the Chapter, which consisted of five dignities (the dean, the archdeacon of Nevers, the treasurer, the cantor, and the archdeacon of Decize), two personnes (the sacristan and the scholasticus), and thirty-six canons. The dean was elected by the Chapter and confirmed by the bishop. The cantor and the archdeacon of Decize were appointed by the king. The canons were appointed by the bishop.

At the beginning of the 10th century, the canons of the cathedral were so unlearned that Bishop Atto (c. 906–c. 914) had to summon a monk of Saint-Amand (diocese of Tournai) named Humbold to teach philosophy, theology and chant.

In 1565, Louis de Gonzague, Duke of Nevers began a campaign to introduce the Jesuits into Nevers, offering a substantial initial sum to support the municipality's college, as well as an annual subsidy. It was not until 1572, however, that a formal agreement was made, and the échevins turned over the buildings in which the college was to be housed. The project came to a halt when the Jesuits were expelled from France by decree of the Parliament of Paris on 29 December 1594. The expulsion was lifted in September 1603, but the municipal authorities debated whether to allow the Jesuits to return to Nevers, until Duke Louis obtained a brevet from Henri IV ordering their return; the municipal authorities drew up a new agreement on 11 January 1607. The Jesuits were finally expelled from France in 1763.

A number of former bishops of Nevers were notable:

- Jacques Spifame (1548–58) who became a Calvinist in 1559, and was afterwards accused of forgery and beheaded at Geneva in 1566;
- the polemicist Sorbin de Ste-Foi (1578–1606), the Confessor of King Charles IX and a voluminous writer.
- Claude Fauchet (1744–1793), constitutional Bishop of Calvados during the Revolution, was a native of the diocese, born at Dornes (Nièvre); he was a Jansenist, an advisor of Mirabeau, and sometime secretary of the National Assembly. He was guillotined on 31 October 1793.

=== Monasteries, abbeys, convents ===
The Abbey of La Charité sur Loire, founded in 1056, and known as the "eldest daughter" of Cluny, was inaugurated on 9 March 1107 by Pope Paschal II; Bishop Hervé of Nevers was present. The celebrated Suger of Saint-Denis, then a simple cleric, has left an account of the ceremony.

The Benedictine Abbey of Corbigny, founded under Charlemagne, was occupied by the Huguenots in 1563, as a base of operations.

Among the congregations for women which originated in the diocese must be mentioned: A house of Ursuline nuns, a teaching order, was founded in 1622 at Nevers by the Nevers aldermen with the assistance of the Duke of Gonzaga-Nevers. The Hospitallers were founded in 1639 at La Charité-sur-Loire by Sister Médard-Varlet. The congregation of Sisters of Charity and Christian Instruction of Nevers, was founded in 1680, and had its mother-house at Nevers. Bernadette Soubirous, the visionary of Lourdes, died in the Convent of the Sisters of Charity and Christian Instruction in Nevers, 16 April 1879.

On 13 February 1790, the French government abolished all religious congregations and orders.

=== French Revolution ===
Even before it directed its attention to the Church directly, the National Constituent Assembly attacked the institution of monasticism. On 13 February 1790. it issued a decree which stated that the government would no longer recognize solemn religious vows taken by either men or women. In consequence, Orders and Congregations which lived under a Rule were suppressed in France. Members of either sex were free to leave their monasteries or convents if they wished, and could claim an appropriate pension by applying to the local municipal authority.

The National Constituent Assembly ordered the replacement of political subdivisions of the ancien régime with subdivisions called "departments", to be characterized by a single administrative city in the center of a compact area. The decree was passed on 22 December 1789, and the boundaries fixed on 26 February 1790, with the effective date of 4 March 1790. A new department was created called "Nièvre," and Nevers became the principal city in the department.

The National Constituent Assembly then, on 6 February 1790, instructed its ecclesiastical committee to prepare a plan for the reorganization of the clergy. At the end of May, its work was presented as a draft Civil Constitution of the Clergy, which, after vigorous debate, was approved on 12 July 1790. There was to be one diocese in each department, requiring the suppression of approximately fifty dioceses. The diocese of "Nièvre" was assigned to the "Metropole du Centre", whose metropolitan was the constitutional bishop of Cher, seated at Bourges.

=== Reconstruction ===
The French Directory fell in the coup engineered by Talleyrand and Napoleon on 10 November 1799. The coup resulted in the establishment of the French Consulate, with Napoleon as the First Consul. To advance his aggressive military foreign policy, he decided to make peace with the Catholic Church and the Papacy. In the concordat of 1801 between the French Consulate, headed by First Consul Napoleon Bonaparte, and Pope Pius VII, and in the enabling papal bull, "Qui Christi Domini", the diocese of Nièvre (Nevers) and all the other dioceses in France, were suppressed. This removed all the institutional contaminations and novelties introduced by the Constitutional Church. The diocesan structure was then re-established by the papal bull "Qui Christi Domini" of 29 November 1801, but the diocese of Nevers was not reestablished. The Concordat was registered as a French law on 8 April 1802.

In 1814, the French monarchy was restored, and on 24 May 1814, the pope returned to Rome from exile in Savona. Work began immediately on a new concordat, to regularize the relations between the two parties. In implementation of the concordat of 27 July 1817, between King Louis XVIII and Pope Pius VII, the diocese of Nevers should have been restored by the bull "Commissa divinitus", but the French Parliament refused to ratify the agreement. It was not until 6 October 1822 that a revised version of the papal bull, now called "Paternae Charitatis" , fortified by an ordonnance of Louis XVIII of 13 January 1823, received the acceptance of all parties. The diocese of Nevers became a suffragan of the archdiocese of Sens.

=== Catholic saints ===
Among the saints of this diocese are:

- Sts. Paul, priest; Péreux and Pélerin, martyrs between 272 and 303;
- St. Paroze (Patritius), Abbot of Nevers in the 6th century;
- the hermit St. Franchy (Francovæcus); the priest St. Vincent of Magny in the 9th century;
- the blessed Nicholas Applaine, once Canon of the collegiate church of Prémery (15th century), whose cassock Louis XI demanded of Bishop Pierre de Fontenay.

The Spanish Dominican, Vincent Ferrer, preached a mission in Nevers in the second half of November 1417.

The chief places of pilgrimage in the diocese are: Notre Dame de Pitié, at St. Martin d'Heuille, dating from the 14th century; Notre Dame de Fauboulvin at Corancy, dating from 1590; Notre Dame du Morvan at Dun-sur-Grandry, dating from 1876.

== Bishops ==
=== To 1000 ===
- (c. 506) : St Euladius
- (c. 517) : Tauricianus
- (c. 538–c. 541) : Rusticus
- (c. 549–c. 552) : Aregius (Aridius)
- Euphronius
- (c. 567) : St Aeoladius (Eloade)
- (c. 580–594): Agricola
- Fulcilius
- (c. 624–c. 653) : Rauracus
- (c. 658) : Leodebaudus
- (c. 660) : Hecherius
- (c. 665–668) : Deodatus (St Dié)
- (c. 666) : Gilbert
- (c. 672) : Rogus
- (c. 691) : St Itier
- (c. 696–c. 697) : Ebarcius
- (c. 702) : Opportunus
- (c. 726) : Nectarius
- (c. 747) : Chebroaldus
- Raginfredus (Raginfroi)
- Waldo
- (c. 800–816) : Hieronymus (Jerome)
- (c. 817–c. 829) : Jonas
- (c. 833) : Gerfredus (Gerfroi)
- Hugo I.
- (c. 840–860) : Hériman
- Raginus
- (c. 861) : Abbo I.
- (c. 864) : Luido
- (866–c. 884) : Abbo II.
- (c. 886–c. 892) : Emmenus
- [(c. 893 : Adalgaire (?)]
- (894–c. 905) : Franco
- (c. 906–c. 914) : Atto
- (c. 91) 6: Launo
- (c. 935–c. 947) : Tedalgrin
- (948–c. 955) : Gaubert
- (c. 958) : Gérard
- (959–979 or 980) : Natran, O.S.B.
- (980–c. 1011) : Roclenus

=== 1000 to 1300 ===
- 1013 – May 1065 : Hugues II. de Champ-Allemand
- c. 1066 – 1 June 1074 : Malguin
- 1. November 1074 – c. 1090 : Hugues III. de Champ-Allemand
- c. 1096 – c. 1099 : Gui
- 18 December 1099 – 8 August 1109 : Hervé
- 1110 – c. 1120 : Hugues IV.
- 1121 – c. 1145 : Fromond
- 1146 – 1159 : Geoffroi
- 1160 – 14 January 1177 : Bernard de Saint-Saulge
- 1177 – 25 April 1188 : Theobaldus (Thibaut)
- 1188 – 15 June 1196 : Jean I.
- 1196 – 11 January 1202 : Gauthier
- c. 1204 – 19 May 1221 : Guillaume I. de Saint-Lazare
- 1222 – 4 December 1222 : Gervais de Châteauneuf
- 1223 – 28 July 1230 : Renaud I.
- 1232 – c. 1240 : Raoul de Beauvais
- 1240 – 1252 or 1253 : Robert Cornut
- 1252 or 1253 – 1254 : Henri Cornut
- 1254 – 31 May 1260 : Guillaume II de Grandpuy
- c. 1262 – 14 January 1273 : Robert II. de Marzi
- 1273–1285 : Gilles de Châteaurenaud
- 23 July 1285 – 28 July 1294 : Gilles II. du Chastelet
- 28 March 1294 – 4 June 1314: Jean II. de Savigny

=== 1300 to 1500 ===
- (1314–1319) : Guillaume III. Beaufils
- (1320–1322) : Pierre Bertrand
- (1322–1332) : Bertrand I. Gascon
- (1333–1334) : Jean III. Mandevillain
- (1335–1339) : Pierre Bertrand de Colombier
- (1339 –1357) : Bertrand (Tissandier)
- (1359–1361) : Renaud II. des Moulins
- (1361–1371) : Pierre Aycelin de Montaigut
- (1371–1372) : Jean IV. de Neufchâtel
- (1374–1380) : Pierre V. de Dinteville
- (1381–1395) : Maurice de Coulange-la-Vineuse (Avignon Obedience)
- (1395–1400) : Philippe I. Froment (Avignon Obedience)
- (1401–1430) : Robert III. de Dangueil (Avignon Obedience)
- (1430–1436) : Jean V. Germain
- (1436–1444) : Jean VI. Vivien
- (1445 – ? ) : Jean Troufon
- ([1446]/1448–1461) : Jean VII. d'Étampes
- (1461–1499): Pierre VI. de Fontenai

=== 1500 to 1800 ===
- (1500–1505) : Philip of Cleves
- (1503–1505) : Niccolò Fieschi, Administrator
- (1505–1507) : Antoine de Fleurs
- (1508–1512) : Jean Bohier
- (1513–1519) : Imbert de la Platière de Bourdillon
- (1519–1539) : Jacques d'Albret
- (1540–1545) : Charles, Cardinal de Bourbon
- (1546–1558) : Jacques Spifame
- (1559–1578) : Gilles Spifame
- (1578–1606) : Arnaud Sarbin de Sainte-Foi
- (1606–1643) : Eustache du Lys
- (1643–1666) : Eustache de Chéri
- (1667–1705) : Edouard I. Valot
- (1705 –1719 : Edouard II Bargedé
- (1719–1740) : Charles Fontaine des Montées
- (1740–1751) : Guillaume d'Hugues
- (1751–1782) : Jean-Antoine Tinseau
- (1783–1788) : Pierre de Séguiran
- (1789–1790) : Louis-Jérôme de Suffren de Saint-Tropez

Constitutional church (schismatic)

- (1791–1801) : Guillaume Tollet (Constitutional Bishop of Nièvre)

=== From 1800 ===
- 1823–1829: Jean-Baptiste-François-Nicolas Millaux
- 1829–1834: Charles de Douhet d'Auzers
- 1834–1842: Paul Naudo (later Archbishop of Avignon)
- 1842–1860: Dominique-Augustin Dufêtre
- 1860–1873: Théodore-Augustin Forcade, M.E.P. (later Archbishop of Aix)
- 1873–1877: Thomas-Casimir-François de Ladoue
- 1877–1903: Etienne-Antoine-Alfred Lelong
- 1906–1910: François-Léon Gauthey (later Archbishop of Besançon)
- 1910–1932: Pierre Chatelus
- 1932–1963: Patrice Flynn
- 1963–1966: Michel-Louis Vial (later Bishop of Nantes)
- 1966–1987: Jean-François-Marie Streiff
- 1988–1997: Michel Paul Marie Moutel, P.S.S.
- 1998–2011: François Deniau
- 2011–2023: Thierry Brac de la Perrière
- 2024– : Grégoire Drouot

== See also ==
- Catholic Church in France

== Reference works ==
- Eubel, Conradus, ed. (1913). Hierarchia catholica (in Latin). Vol. 1 (second ed.). Münster: Libreria Regensbergiana. pp. 333–334.
- Eubel, Conradus, ed. (1914). Hierarchia catholica (in Latin). Vol. 2 (second ed.). Münster: Libreria Regensbergiana. p. 189.
- Eubel, Conradus, ed. (1923). Hierarchia catholica (in Latin). Vol. 3 (second ed.). Münster: Libreria Regensbergiana.
- Gauchat, Patritius (Patrice) (1935). Hierarchia catholica (in Latin). Vol. IV (1592-1667). Münster: Libraria Regensbergiana. p. 237.
- Ritzler, Remigius; Sefrin, Pirminus (1952). Hierarchia catholica medii et recentis aevi (in Latin). Vol. V (1667-1730). Patavii: Messagero di S. Antonio. p. 263
- Ritzler, Remigius; Sefrin, Pirminus (1958). Hierarchia catholica medii et recentis aevi (in Latin). Vol. VI (1730-1799). Patavii: Messagero di S. Antonio. p. 284.
- Ritzler, Remigius; Sefrin, Pirminus (1968). Hierarchia Catholica medii et recentioris aevi (in Latin). Vol. VII (1800–1846). Monasterii: Libr. Regensburgiana.
- Remigius Ritzler; Pirminus Sefrin (1978). Hierarchia catholica Medii et recentioris aevi (in Latin). Vol. VIII (1846–1903). Il Messaggero di S. Antonio.
- Pięta, Zenon (2002). Hierarchia catholica medii et recentioris aevi (in Latin). Vol. IX (1903–1922). Padua: Messagero di San Antonio. ISBN 978-88-250-1000-8.
- Sainte-Marthe, Denis de (1770). Gallia christiana, in provincias ecclesiasticas distributa:opera et studio Domni Dionysii Sammarthani, presbyteri et monachii ordinis Sancti Benedicti e congregatione Sancti Mauri nec non monachorum ejusdem congregationis (in Latin). Vol. Tomus XII. Paris: Apud V. Palme. pp. 625–685, Instrumenta, 298–358.

=== Studies ===
- Bresse, J.M. (1913). Abbayes et prieures de l'ancienne France: recueil historique des archevêchés, évêchés, abbayes et prieurés de France. (in French). Volume 15. Paris: A. Picard, 1913. pp. 103–120.
- Crosnier, Augustin-Joseph (1854). Monographie de la cathédrale de Nevers (in French). Nevers: Morel.. Archived.
- Crosnier, Augustin-Joseph (1877). Les congregations religieuses dans le diocèse de Nevers: Congregations d'hommes (in French). Nevers: Chez Michot.
- Crosnier, Augustin-Joseph (1881). Les congregations religieuses dans le diocese de Nevers: Congregations de femmes (in French). Nevers: Chez Michot. p. 251. Archived.
- Duchesne, Louis (1910). Fastes épiscopaux de l'ancienne Gaule: II. L'Aquitaine et les Lyonnaises. Paris: Fontemoing. pp. 479–486. Archived.
- Fisquet, Honoré (1864). La France pontificale (Gallia Christiana): Metropole de Sens: Nevers-Bethléhem (in French). Paris: Étienne Repos. pp. 1–147.. Archived.
- Jean, Armand (1891). Les évêques et les archevêques de France depuis 1682 jusqu'à 1801 (in French). Paris: A. Picard. pp. 372–374.
- Parmentier, Charles-Antoine (1842). Archives de Nevers on inventaire historique des titres de la ville (in French). Volume 1. Volume 2. Paris: Techener, 1842.
- Pisani, Paul (1907). Répertoire biographique de l'épiscopat constitutionnel (1791–1802) (in French). Paris: A. Picard et fils.
- Sainte-Marie, Louis de (1810). Recherches historiques sur Nevers (in French). Nevers: Lefebvre. pp. 249–323.
- Société bibliographique (France) (1907). L'épiscopat français depuis le Concordat jusqu'à la Séparation (1802–1905). Paris: Librairie des Saints-Pères.
- Soultrait, Georges comte de; Soultrait, Jacques Hyacinthe Georges Richard comte de (1879). Armorial historique et archéologique du Nivernais (in French). Vol. Tome premier. Nevers: Michot. pp. 39–58.

=== External links ===
- (in French) Centre national des Archives de l'Église de France, L’Épiscopat francais depuis 1919, retrieved: 2016-12-24.
- Goyau, Georges. "Nevers." The Catholic Encyclopedia. Vol. 10. New York: Robert Appleton Company, 1911. Retrieved: 22 February 2025.
