= Bernadette Soubirous =

French Roman Catholic saint (1844–1879)

Saint Bernadette SCN
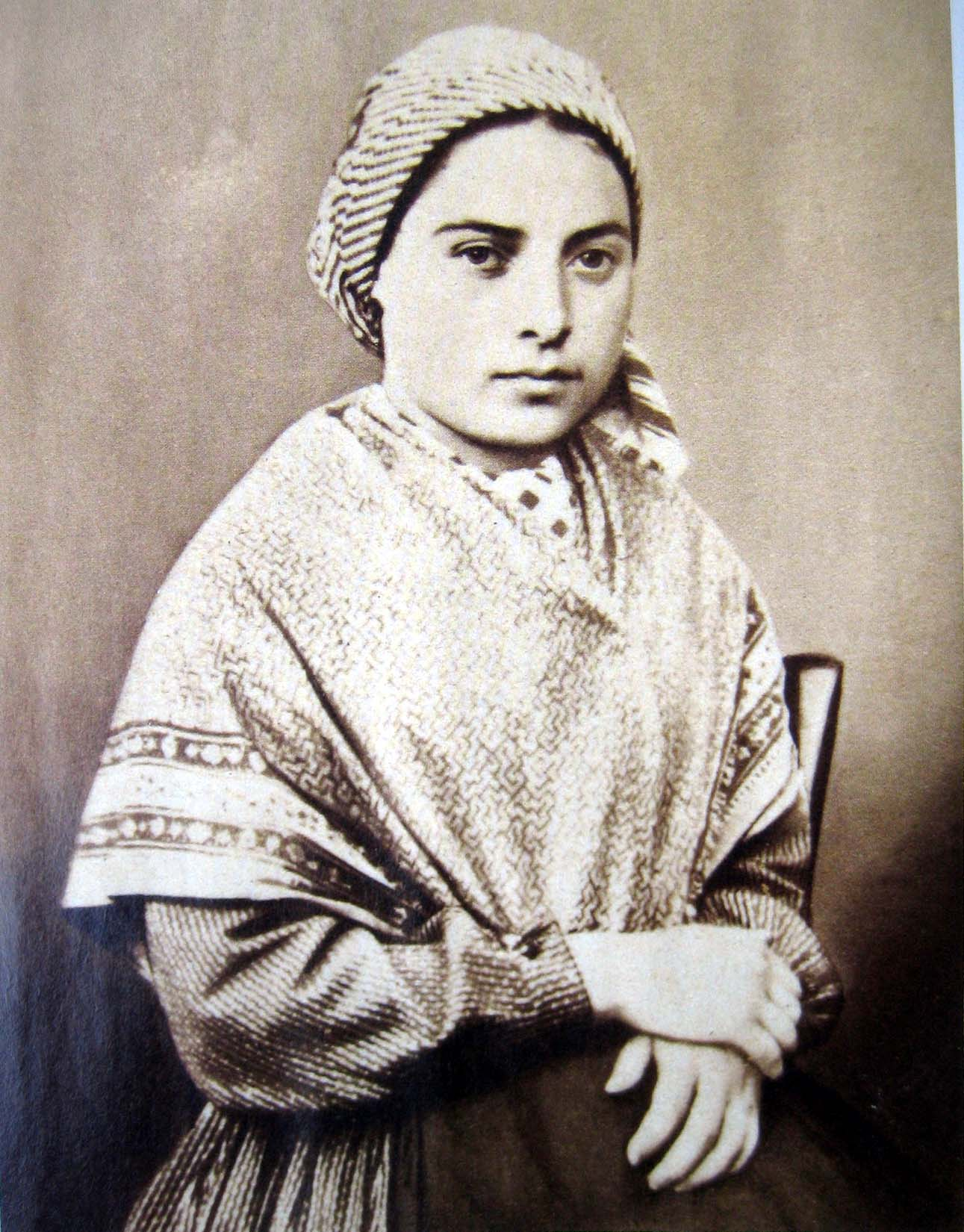
- Soubirous c. 1858

Virgin
- Born: Bernadette Soubirous; 7 January 1844; Lourdes, Hautes-Pyrénées, Kingdom of France
- Died: 16 April 1879 (aged 35); Nevers, Nièvre, France
- Venerated in: Catholic Church
- Beatified: 14 June 1925, Rome by Pope Pius XI
- Canonized: 8 December 1933, Rome by Pope Pius XI
- Major shrine: Saint Gildard (Espace Bernadette Soubirous Nevers), Nevers
- Feast: 16 April (Roman Calendar); 18 February (Pre-1969 Roman Calendar)
- Patronage: Illness, People ridiculed for their piety, Poverty, Shepherds, Shepherdesses, and Lourdes, France

Bernadette Soubirous, SCN (/ˌbɜːrnəˈdɛt ˌsuːbiˈruː/; French: [bɛʁnadɛt subiʁu]; Occitan: Bernadeta Sobirós [beɾnaˈðetɔ suβiˈɾus]; 7 January 1844 – 16 April 1879), also known as Bernadette of Lourdes (religious name Marie-Bernarde), was a miller's daughter from Lourdes (Lorda in Occitan), in the department of Hautes-Pyrénées in France, and is best known for experiencing apparitions of a "young lady" who asked for a chapel to be built at the nearby cave-grotto. These apparitions occurred between 11 February and 16 July 1858, and the young lady who appeared to her identified herself as the "Immaculate Conception".

After a canonical investigation, Soubirous's reports were eventually declared "worthy of belief" on 18 February 1862, and the Marian apparition became known as Our Lady of Lourdes. In 1866, Soubirous joined the Sisters of Charity of Nevers at their convent in Nevers where she spent the last years of her life. Her body is said by the Catholic Church to remain internally incorrupt. The grotto where the apparitions occurred became a major pilgrimage site and Marian shrine known as the Sanctuary of Our Lady of Lourdes, attracting around five million pilgrims of all denominations each year.

Pope Pius XI beatified Soubirous on 14 June 1925 and canonized her on 8 December 1933. Her feast day, initially specified as 18 February – the day Mary promised to make her happy, not in this life, but in the other – is now observed in most places on the date of her death, 16 April.

== Early life ==
Marie-Bernarde Soubirous, nick-named Bernadette in Occitan, was the daughter of François Soubirous (1807–1871), a miller, and his wife Louise (née Casteròt; 1825–1866), a miller's daughter. She was the eldest of nine children, Jean (born and died 1845), Marie, known as Toinette (1846–1892), Jean-Marie (1848–1851), Jean-Marie (1851–1919), Justin (1855–1865), Pierre (1859–1931), Jean (born and died 1864), and a baby named Louise who died soon after her birth (1866).

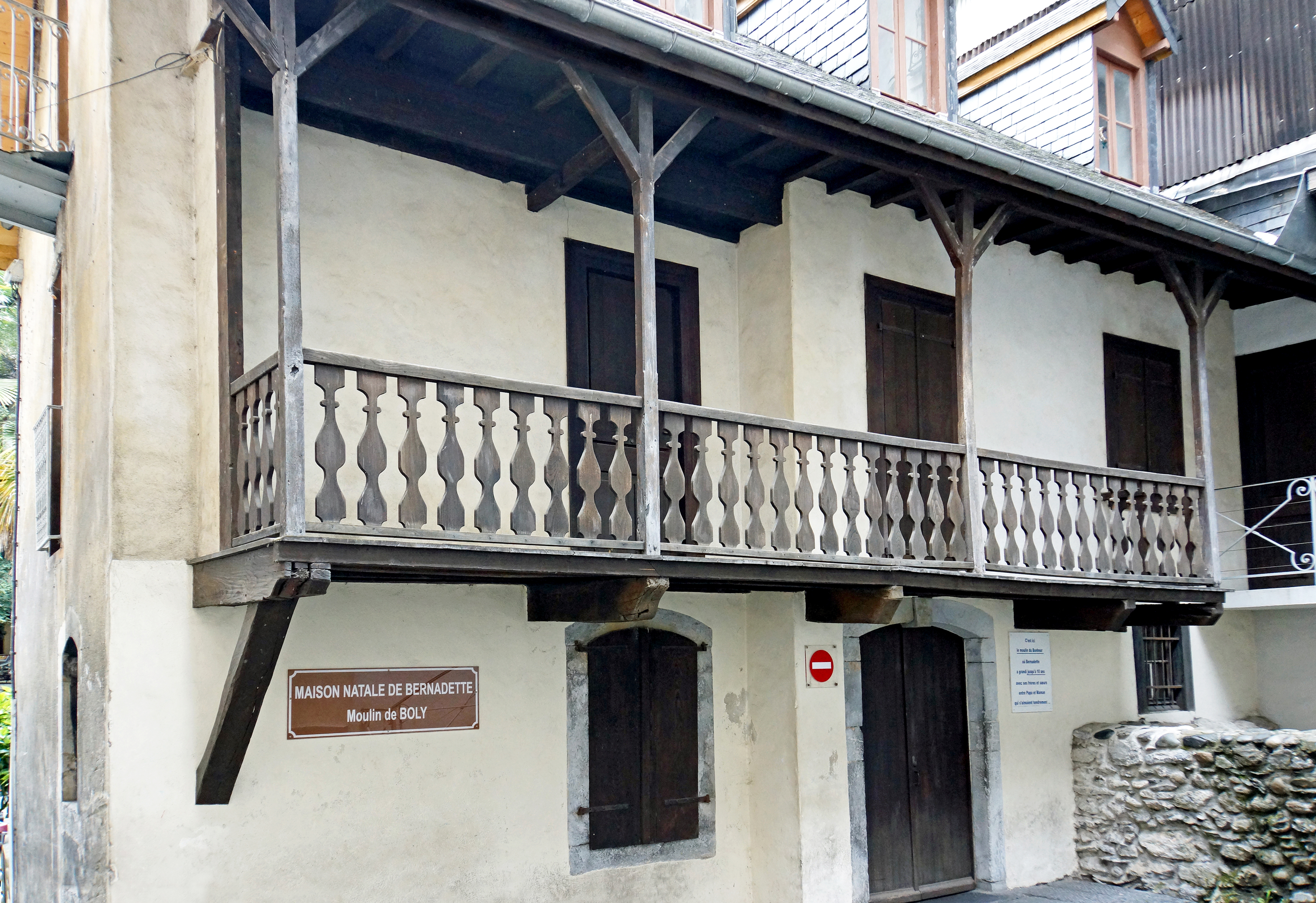
The Boly Mill was the birthplace of Bernadette Subirous and she lived there happily for the first ten years of her life until increasing poverty forced the family to move to poorer accommodation.

Soubirous was born on 7 January 1844 and baptized at the local parish church, St. Pierre's, on 9 January, her parents' wedding anniversary. Her godmother was Bernarde Casterot, her mother's sister, a moderately wealthy widow who owned a tavern. Hard times had fallen on France, and the family lived in extreme poverty. Soubirous was a very sick child and possibly due to this only measured 1.4 m (4 ft. 7in.) tall. She contracted cholera as a toddler and suffered severe asthma for the rest of her life. Soubirous attended the day school conducted by the Sisters of Charity and Christian Instruction of Nevers. Contrary to a belief popularized by Hollywood films, Soubirous learned very little French, only studying French in school after age 13. At that time she could read and write very little due to her frequent illness. She spoke the language of Occitan, which was spoken by the local population of the Pyrenees region at that time and to a residual degree today.

== Visions ==
By the time of the events at the grotto, the Soubirous family's financial and social status had declined to the point where they lived in a one-room basement, an abandoned jail, called le cachot, "the dungeon", where they were housed for free by her mother's cousin, André Sajoux.

On 11 February 1858, Soubirous, then aged 14, was out gathering firewood with her sister Toinette and a friend near the grotto of Massabielle (Tuta de Massavielha) when she experienced her first vision. While the other girls crossed the little stream in front of the grotto and walked on, Soubirous stayed behind, looking for a place to cross where she wouldn't get her stockings wet. She finally sat down to take her shoes off in order to cross the water and was lowering her stocking when she heard the sound of rushing wind, but nothing moved. A wild rose in a natural niche in the grotto, however, did move. From the niche, or rather the dark alcove behind it, "came a dazzling light, and a white figure". This was the first of 18 visions of what she referred to as aquerò (pronounced [ake'ɾɔ]), Gascon Occitan for "that". In later testimony, she called it "a small young lady" (uo petito damizelo). Her sister and her friend stated that they had seen nothing.

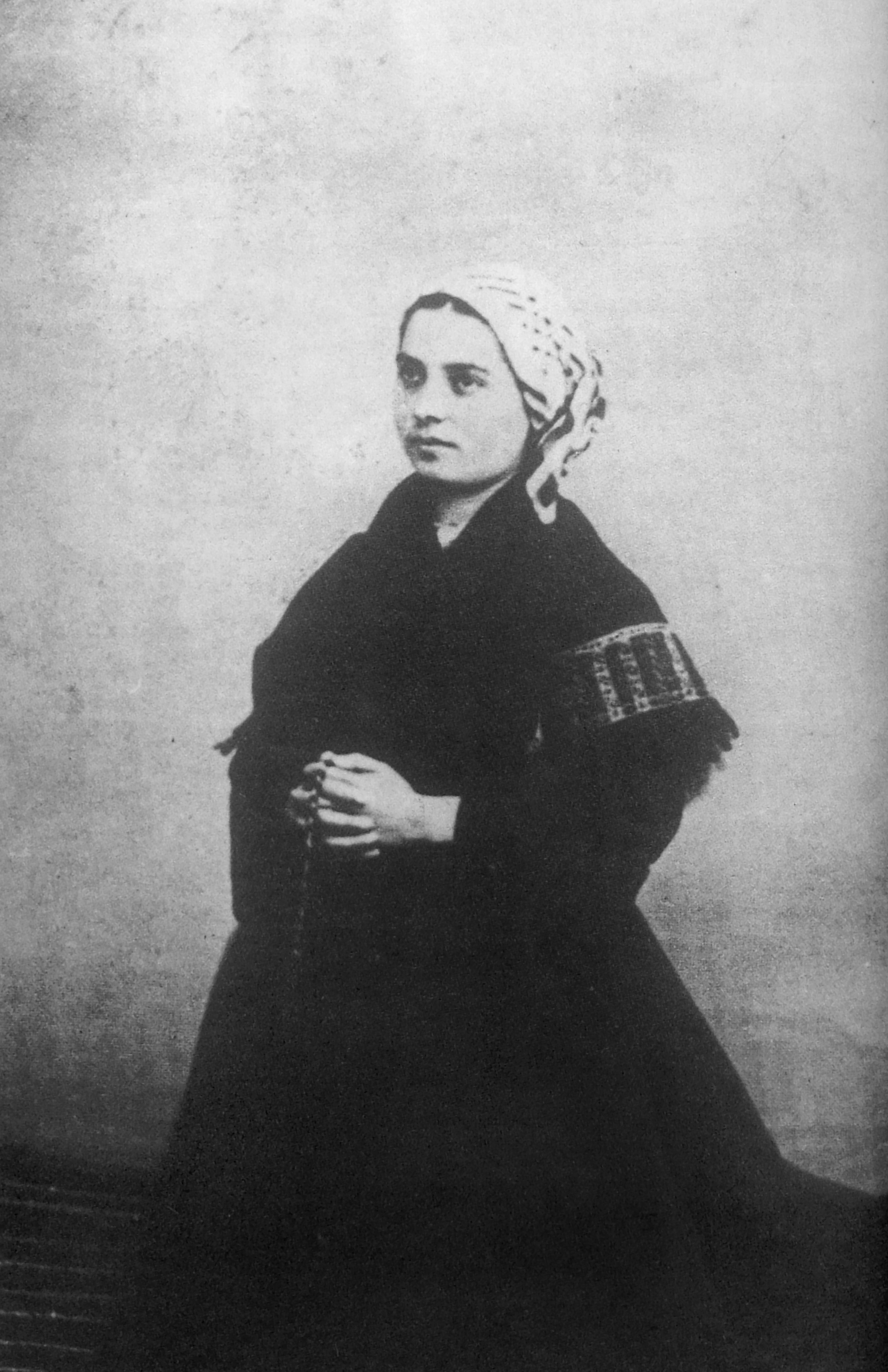
Soubirous in 1863

On 14 February, after Sunday Mass, Soubirous, again with sister Marie and some other girls, returned to the grotto. Soubirous knelt down immediately, saying she saw the apparition again. When one of the girls threw holy water at the niche and another threw a rock from above that shattered on the ground, the apparition disappeared. On her next visit, 18 February, Soubirous said that "the vision" asked her to return to the grotto every day for a fortnight.

This period of almost daily visions came to be known as la Quinzaine sacrée, "holy fortnight." Initially, Soubirous's parents, especially her mother, were embarrassed and tried to forbid her to go. The supposed apparition did not identify herself until the seventeenth vision. Although the townspeople who believed she was telling the truth assumed she saw the Virgin Mary, Soubirous never claimed it to be Mary, consistently using the word aquerò. She described the lady as wearing a white veil, a blue girdle and with a yellow rose on each foot – compatible with "a description of any statue of the Virgin in a village church".

Soubirous's story caused a sensation among the townspeople, who were divided in their opinions on whether or not she was telling the truth. Some believed her to have a mental illness and demanded she be put in an asylum.

The other contents of Soubirous's reported visions were simple and focused on the need for prayer and penance. On 25 February she explained that the vision had told her "to drink of the water of the spring, to wash in it and to eat the herb that grew there," as an act of penance. To everyone's surprise, the next day the grotto was no longer muddy but clear water flowed. On 2 March, at the thirteenth apparition, Soubirous told her family that the lady said that "a chapel should be built and a procession formed".

The sixteenth vision, which Soubirous stated went on for over an hour, was on 25 March. According to her account, during that visitation, she again asked the woman for her name but the lady just smiled back. She repeated the question three more times and finally heard the lady say, in Gascon Occitan, "I am the Immaculate Conception" (Que soy era immaculada councepciou in Occitan). Despite being rigorously interviewed by officials of both the Catholic Church and the French government, she stuck consistently to her story.

On 7 April, Soubirous had another vision, during which her hand was apparently not burnt while being in contact with the flame of a candle for several minutes. On 8 June 1858, the mayor of Lourdes decided to barricade the grotto and put guards to prevent public access. On 16 July, Soubirous came back to see the grotto from the other side of the river and experienced her eighteenth and last apparition of the lady.

=== Description of the vision ===
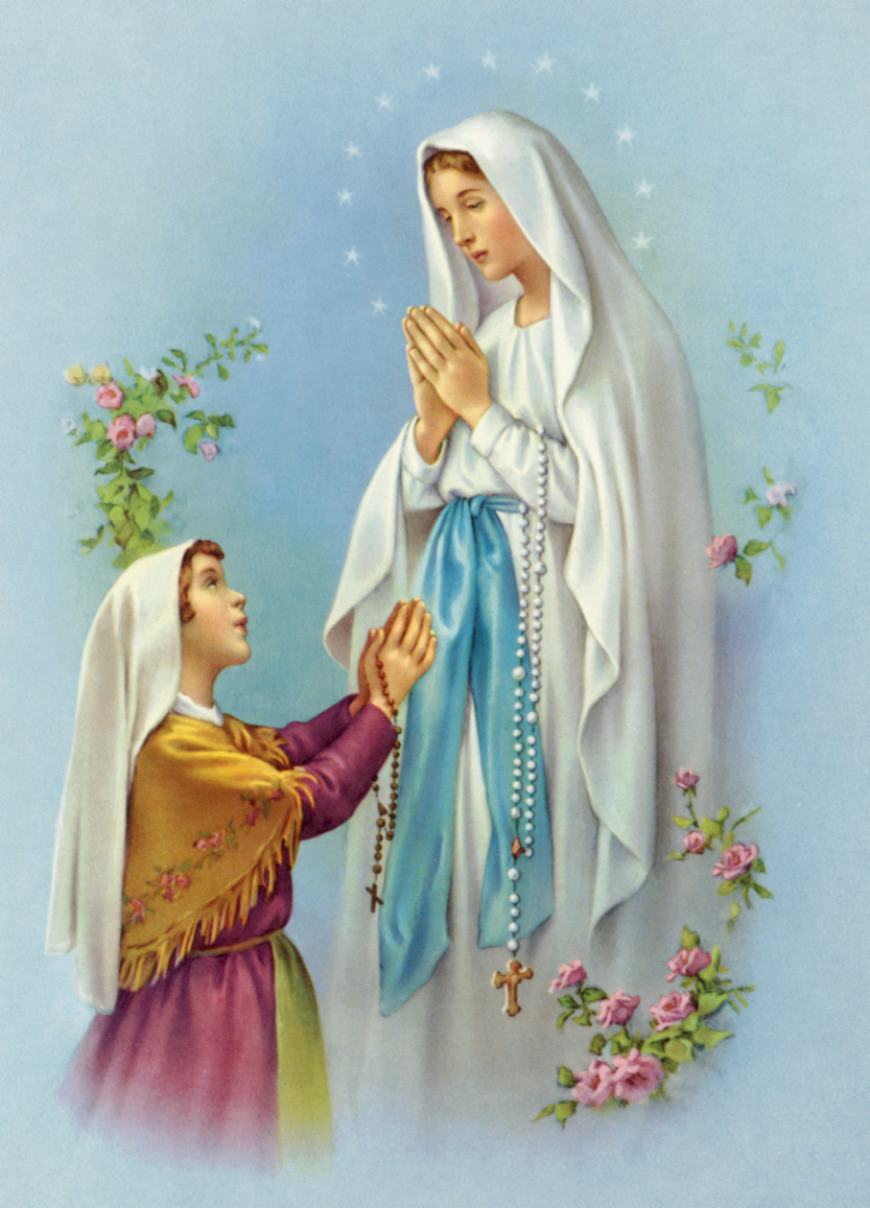
Old religious card with the apparition of the Virgin Mary in Lourdes, France

As happened later with the 1917 Marian apparitions of Fatima in Portugal, the primordial description of the entity made by Bernadette Soubirous was gradually modified to fit the more familiar Marian iconography images. In the seer's account, the apparition was a small figure, a young girl (a "jeune fille"), who looked like a twelve-year-old child, who was later transformed by interpreters into a "lady" of fifteen or even twenty years of age. The commissioned statue by Joseph-Hugues Fabisch also failed to capture the extreme beauty and youth of the apparition, and Bernadette commented: "too big, too old".

== Results of the visions ==
After investigation, Catholic Church authorities confirmed the authenticity of the apparitions in 1862. In the 160 years since Soubirous dug up the spring, 72 cures have been verified by the Lourdes Medical Bureau as "inexplicable" – after what the Catholic Church claims are "extremely rigorous scientific and medical examinations" that failed to find any other explanation. The Lourdes Commission that examined Bernadette after the visions ran an intensive analysis on the water and found that, while it had a high mineral content, it contained nothing out of the ordinary that would account for the cures attributed to it. Bernadette said that it was faith and prayer that cured the sick: "One must have faith and pray; the water will have no virtue without faith".

Soubirous's request to the local priest to build a chapel at the site of her visions eventually gave rise to a number of chapels and churches at Lourdes. The Sanctuary of Our Lady of Lourdes is now one of the major Catholic pilgrimage sites in the world. One of the churches built at the site, the Basilica of St. Pius X, can accommodate 25,000 people and was dedicated by the future Pope John XXIII when he was the Papal Nuncio to France. In 2013, 715,000 and in 2016, 570,000 pilgrims attended pilgrimage events.

== Later years ==
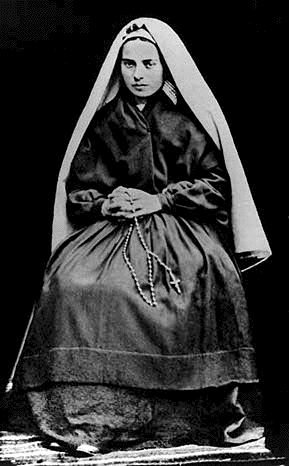
Bernadette in 1866, after having taken the religious habit and joining the Sisters of Charity

Disliking the attention she was attracting, Bernadette went to the hospice school run by the Sisters of Charity of Nevers where she had learned to read and write. Although she considered joining the Carmelites, her health precluded her entering any of the strict contemplative orders. On 29 July 1866, with 42 other candidates, she took the religious habit of a postulant and joined the Sisters of Charity at their motherhouse, the Saint Gildard Convent at Nevers. Her Mistress of Novices was Marie Therese Vauzou. The Mother Superior at the time gave her the name Marie-Bernarde in honor of her godmother who was named "Bernarde". As Patricia A. McEachern observes, "Bernadette was devoted to Saint Bernard, her patron saint; she copied long texts related to him in notebooks and on bits of paper. The experience of becoming 'Sister Marie-Bernard' marked a turning point for Bernadette as she realized more than ever that the great grace she received from the Queen of Heaven brought with it great responsibilities."

Soubirous spent the rest of her brief life at the motherhouse, working as an assistant in the infirmary and later as a sacristan, creating ornate embroidery for altar cloths and vestments. Her contemporaries admired her humility and spirit of sacrifice. One day, asked about the apparitions, she replied:

The Virgin used me as a broom to remove the dust. When the work is done, the broom is put behind the door again.

Soubirous had followed the development of Lourdes as a pilgrimage shrine while she still lived at Lourdes but was not present for the consecration of the Basilica of the Immaculate Conception there in 1876.

Soubirous's childhood bout of "cholera left [...] [Bernadette] with severe, chronic asthma, and eventually she contracted tuberculosis of the lungs and bones." For several months prior to her death, she was unable to take an active part in convent life. She eventually died of her long-term illness at the age of 35 on 16 April 1879 (Easter Wednesday), while praying the Holy Rosary. On her deathbed, as she suffered from severe pain and in keeping with the Virgin Mary's admonition of "Penance, Penance, Penance," Bernadette proclaimed that "all this is good for Heaven!" Her final words were, "Blessed Mary, Mother of God, Pray for me". Soubirous' body was laid to rest in the St Joseph Chapel, in the grounds of her convent.

== Sainthood ==
Soubirous was declared blessed on 14 June 1921 by Pope Pius XI. She was canonized by Pius XI on 8 December 1933, the feast of the Immaculate Conception.

She is celebrated in the liturgical calendar of the Catholic Church on 16 April. In France, her liturgical celebration is an optional memorial and is held on 18 February, which commemorates Bernadette's third vision – during which the "lady" told her that she does not promise to make her happy in this world, but in the other.

== Mortal remains ==
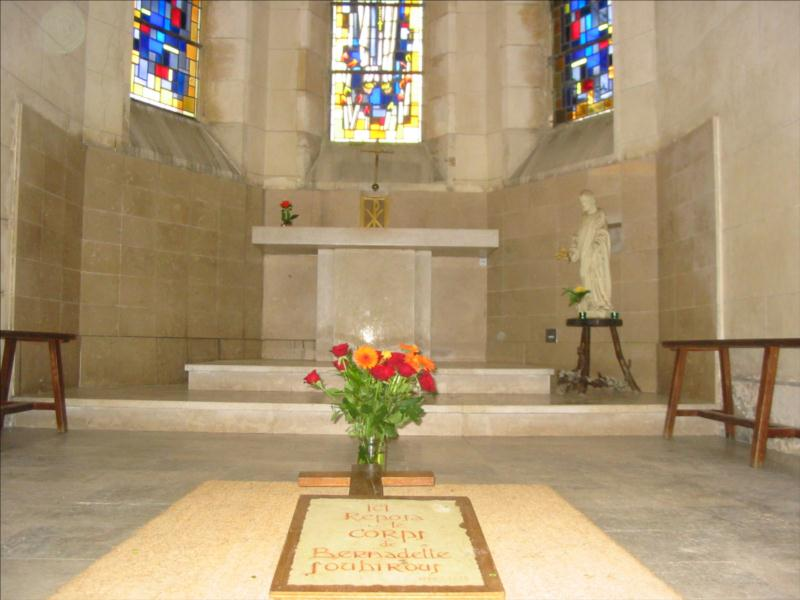
The Chapel of St Joseph, where Bernadette Soubirous was interred for forty years

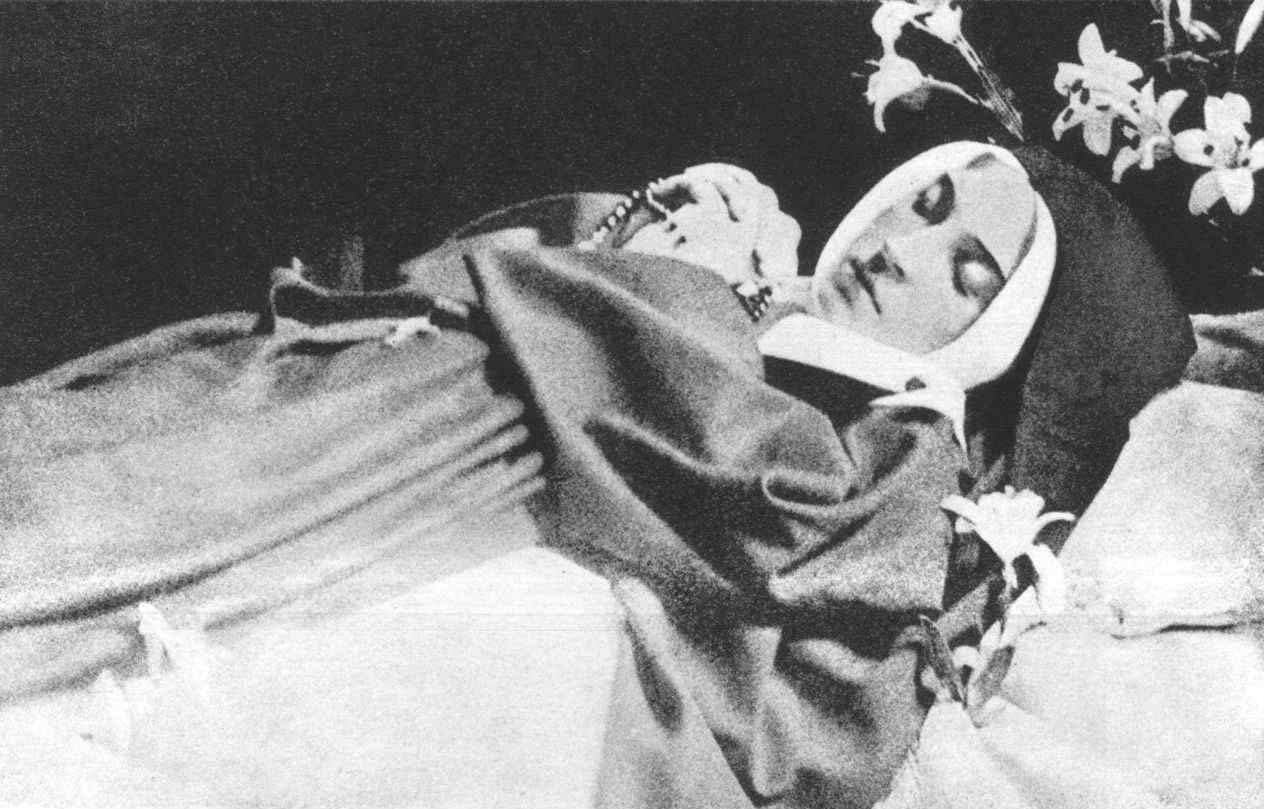
Full-body relic of Bernadette Soubirous. The photograph was taken at the last exhumation (18 April 1925). The saint died 46 years before the photo was taken; her face and hands are covered with a wax coat.

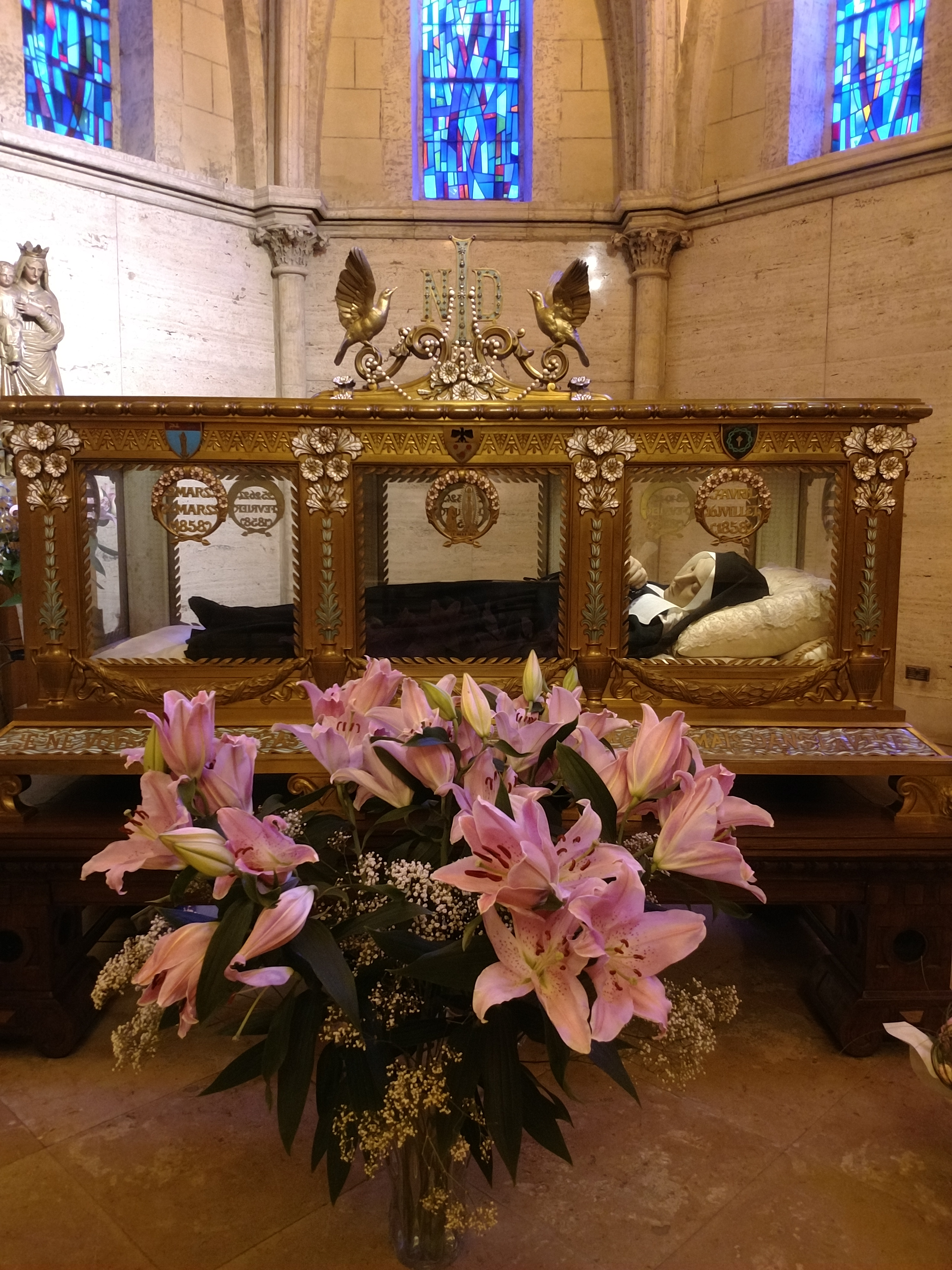
The reliquary containing the body of Saint Bernadette Soubirous

Bishop Gauthey of Nevers and the Catholic Church exhumed the body of Soubirous on 22 September 1909, in the presence of representatives appointed by the postulators of the cause, two doctors and a sister of the community. They claimed that although the crucifix in her hand and her rosary had both oxidized, her body appeared incorrupt – preserved from decomposition. This was cited as one of the miracles to support her canonization. They washed and reclothed her body before re-burial in the Chapel of St Joseph in a new double casket.

The church exhumed the corpse a second time on 3 April 1919, on the occasion of the approval of Bernadette's canonization. Dr. Comte, who examined the body, noted, "The body is practically mummified, covered with patches of mildew and quite a notable layer of salts, which appear to be calcium salts. [...] The skin has disappeared in some places, but it is still present on most parts of the body." Again, the body was returned to the vault of St Joseph's chapel.

In 1925, the church exhumed the body for a third time. They took relics, which were sent to Rome. A precise imprint of the face was molded to make a wax mask based on the imprints and on some genuine photos to be placed on her body. This was common practice for relics in France as it was feared that the blackish tinge to the face and the sunken eyes and nose would be viewed as corruption by the public. Imprints of the hands were also taken for the presentation of the body and the making of wax casts. The remains were then placed in a gold and crystal reliquary in the Chapel of Saint Bernadette at the main church of the convent

Three years later in 1928, Doctor Comte published a report on the third exhumation of Soubirous in the second issue of the Bulletin de l'Association medicale de Notre-Dame de Lourdes.

I would have liked to open the left side of the thorax to take the ribs as relics and then remove the heart which I am certain must have survived. However, as the trunk was slightly supported on the left arm, it would have been rather difficult to try and get at the heart without doing too much noticeable damage. As the Mother Superior had expressed a desire for the Saint's heart to be kept together with the whole body, and as Monsignor the Bishop did not insist, I gave up the idea of opening the left-hand side of the thorax and contented myself with removing the two right ribs which were more accessible. [...] What struck me during this examination, of course, was the state of perfect preservation of the skeleton, the fibrous tissues of the muscles (still supple and firm), of the ligaments, and of the skin, and above all the totally unexpected state of the liver after 46 years. One would have thought that this organ, which is basically soft and inclined to crumble, would have decomposed very rapidly or would have hardened to a chalky consistency. Yet, when it was cut it was soft and almost normal in consistency. I pointed this out to those present, remarking that this did not seem to be a natural phenomenon.

In 1970, the convent at Nevers was converted into a pilgrimage centre dedicated to Soubirous, run by volunteers and a few sisters and known as Espace Bernadette Soubirous Nevers.

In the spring of 2015, the town of Lourdes lobbied for Soubirous's remains to be returned to Lourdes, a move opposed by the city of Nevers.

== Minor relics ==
The Sanctuary of Our Lady of Lourdes has a few bodily relics which traveled in several European dioceses from 2017 to be exposed for the veneration of people. In 2019, a new reliquary was built for the travel of the relics. In 2022, the reliquary visited the United States and the United Kingdom. The relics first traveled to the United States from April to August 2022, visiting around thirty dioceses. In September and October 2022, the relics were exposed in around fifty places in England, Scotland, and Wales, including in the Westminster Cathedral and at the Carfin Lourdes Grotto.

== Places ==
The town of Lourdes where Bernadette grew up and had her visions has become a major international pilgrimage site attracting millions of visitors each year. Several churches and infrastructures were built around the cave where the apparitions occurred, forming together the Sanctuary of Our Lady of Lourdes. The sanctuary is reputed for the Lourdes water streaming inside the cave from a spring discovered by Bernadette during the apparitions, which is said to have healing properties, attracting many sick pilgrims. The most recent church in the sanctuary is the St. Bernadette Church, completed in 1988. The sanctuary also has a museum called the St. Bernadette Museum, dedicated to the history of the apparitions. In the city center of Lourdes, pilgrims can visit the house where Bernadette was born and the room where her family was staying at the time of the apparitions.

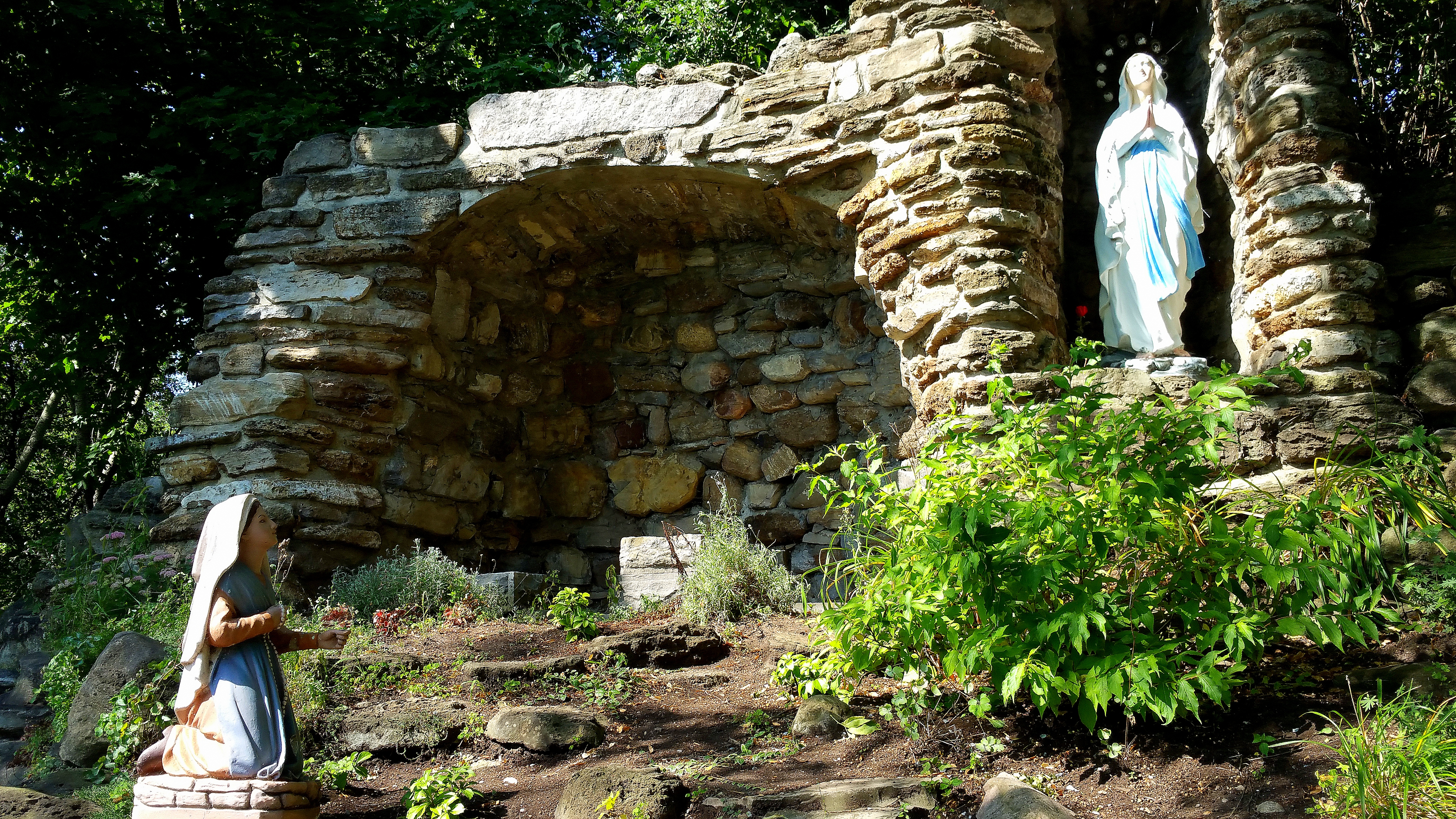
Lourdes grotto in Canada, near Montreal

Hundreds of Lourdes grottos were built all over the world after the apparitions to allow believers to venerate Our Lady of Lourdes in their own countries, specially those who could not afford to make the expensive and long trip to Lourdes. These replicas of the original cave where the apparitions occurred recreate the scenes of the apparitions, usually with a statue of Our Lady of Lourdes in a niche and a statue of Bernadette on her knees and praying or holding a candle.

The Espace Bernadette Soubirous Nevers, is dedicated to her memory. This is where her body has been kept after her death. Her body is now exposed for the veneration of visitors. The city of Nevers also has a museum dedicated to the life of Bernadette, called the "Bernadette Museum".

Numerous churches, shrines and Catholic schools are named after St. Bernadette all over the world. The first church in Europe to be dedicated to her was the Church of Our Lady of Victories and St Bernadette at Ensbury Park, Bournemouth, southwest England: it was under construction at the time of her canonisation and opened in 1934.

== Depictions ==
- In 1909, the French short movie Bernadette Soubirous et les Apparitions de Lourdes, directed by Honoré Le Sablais, is the first attempt to tell with the new cinematographic art the story of Bernadette, according to the RAI 3 documentary Lourdes. La storia.
- In 1935, the Portuguese Georges Pallu directed La Vierge du rocher ("The Virgin of the Rock") with Micheline Masson in the role of Bernadette.
- In 1941, Soubirous's life was given a fictionalized treatment in Franz Werfel's 1941 novel The Song of Bernadette
- In 1943, director Henry King and screenwriter George Seaton adapted Werfel's novel into a film of the same name, starring Jennifer Jones as Bernadette and the uncredited Linda Darnell as the Immaculate Conception. Jones won the Best Actress Oscar for this portrayal.
- On 13 October 1958, the Westinghouse Desilu Playhouse presented Song of Bernadette on the CBS television network starring Italian-born film and television actress Pier Angeli as Bernadette Soubirous. The cast also featured Marian Seldes and Norman Alden. The program, hosted by Desi Arnaz, was adapted by Ludi Claire from a story by Margaret Gray Blanton. It was directed by both Ralph Alswang and Claudio Guzmán.
- In 1961, Danièle Ajoret portrayed Bernadette in Bernadette of Lourdes (French title: Il suffit d'aimer or Love is Enough) of Robert Darène.
- In 1961, the German TV movie Bernadette Soubirous directed by Hans Quest and starring Kornelia Boje.
- Cristina Galbó portrayed Aquella joven de blanco (A Little Maiden in White), Spain, 1965, directed by León Klimovsky.
- In 1967, a French TV movie L'affaire Lourdes directed by Marcel Bluwal and starring Marie-Hélène Breillat as Bernadette.
- In 1972, the rock band Yes released "Close to the Edge" where the lyrics for the "I get up" section were based on the visions of Bernadette.
- In 1981, Andrea del Boca portrayed Bernadette in an eponymous Argentine television mini-series directed by her father Nicolás del Boca (4 episodes of 1 hour each).
- Bernadette in 1988 and its sequel The Passion of Bernadette in 1990 by Jean Delannoy, starring Sydney Penny in the lead role.
- In 1990, the musical Bernadette (Hughes and Hughes) ran for three and a half weeks at the Dominion Theatre, Tottenham Court Road, London. It was directed by Ernest Maxin.
- In 1990, Fernando Uribe and Steven Hahn directed a short animated film, Bernadette: La Princesa de Lourdes, produced by John Williams and Jorge Gonzalez, available in English since 1991 with the title Bernadette – The Princess of Lourdes.
- Angèle Osinsky portrayed Saint Bernadette in the Italian TV movie Lourdes, 2000, by Lodovico Gasparini.
- In 2002, the musical Vision by Jonathan Smith and Dominic Hartley, depicting the life of Bernadette, debuted in Liverpool. It has been performed in the UK, France, and Nigeria.
- In 2007, the Indian film Our Lady of Lourdes directed by V.R. Gopinath and starring Ajna Noiseux.
- In 2009, Bernadette, an opera in three acts by Trevor Jones. First performance 2016 in Gloucestershire, England.
- In 2011, the French short movie Grotta profunda, les humeurs du gouffredirected by Pauline Curnier Jardin and starring Simon Fravega.
- In 2011, the French film Je m'appelle Bernadette directed by Jean Sagols and starring Katia Cuq (Katia Miran).
- In 2013, the French TV movie Une femme nommée Marie, directed by Robert Hossein and Dominique Thiel, starring Manon Le Moal.
- In 2013, Bernadette Kaviyam, a book published by Geetham Publications, Chennai. Bernadette's life explained with poetry by Poet C.P.Sivarasan, Mangalakuntu.
- In 2015, "Le Coup de Grâce", an original song about St. Bernadette was published and released on YouTube by American songwriter Orv Pibbs. https://www.youtube.com/watch?v=mNieSdjLa2s
- In 2023, a musical, The Song of Bernadette, based on Frank Werfel's novel, premiered at the Skylight Music Theatre in Milwaukee.
- Bernadette the Musical starring Eyma as Bernadette Soubirous plays at the Athenaeum Center for Thought and Culture in Chicago, Illinois, from 12 February to 15 March 2026.

== Works cited ==
- Harris, Ruth (1999). Lourdes: body and spirit in the secular age. Viking. ISBN 0-670-87905-3.
- Taylor, Thérèse (2003). Bernadette of Lourdes. Burns and Oates. ISBN 0-86012-337-5.
