= Lourdes Medical Bureau =

French medical organization

The Lourdes Medical Bureau (Bureau des Constatations Médicales) is an official medical organization based in Lourdes, France, within the Sanctuary of Our Lady of Lourdes. Its function is to transfer medical investigation of apparent cures associated with the shrine of Lourdes to the International Medical Committee of Lourdes (Comité Médical International de Lourdes). In 2013 it is presided over by Nicolas Brouwet, Bishop of Tarbes and Lourdes, and François-Bernard Michel, also president of the Académie Nationale de Médecine

The term Medical Bureau is also used by the International Medical Association of Lourdes to refer to a special conference of its members, which may be called to investigate reports of inexplicable healing.

== History ==
The reported apparitions of Our Lady of Lourdes were reported to have taken place between 11 February and 16 July 1858 in Lourdes, France. After this time, reports of apparently miraculous cures began to accumulate, prompting calls for the Roman Catholic Church to recognise these events as miracles. The earliest investigations of these cases were carried out by an Episcopal Commission of Inquiry led by Canon Germain Baradère and reporting directly to Mgr Laurence, bishop of Tarbes. The commission's earliest work was conducted without medical consultation, with only clerical opinion being sought as to the nature of the cures.

In 1859, Professor Henri Vergez from the Faculty of Medicine at Montpellier was appointed medical consultant to the Episcopal Commission of Inquiry. Vergez's views were often at odds with those of his clerical colleagues. Vergez decided that only eight of the early cases were genuinely inexplicable.

In 1883 a body called the Bureau des Constatations Médicales was established by doctors affiliated with the sanctuary. This was the forerunner of the current Medical Bureau. Its first titular head was the nobleman Baron Dunot de Saint-Maclou, and the Bureau was housed at the residence of the Garaison Fathers in Lourdes. Following the establishment of the Bureau des Constatations Médicales, the number of recognised cures dropped from 143 in 1883 to only 83 in 1884.

Dunot de Saint-Maclou died in 1891 and was succeeded by Dr. Gustave Boissarie who headed the Medical Bureau until 1914, and met with the French author Émile Zola when he visited Lourdes in August 1892. Dr. Bonamy, a character in Zola's 1894 novel Lourdes, is unflatteringly based on Boissarie. Boissarie wrote a celebrated book, L'Histoire Médicale de Lourdes, in 1891, which was praised by Pope Leo XIII. Boissarie moved the offices of the Bureau to accommodation beneath the right ramp of the Upper Basilica, where he met with people who claimed to have been cured.

In 1905, Pope Pius X decreed that claims of miraculous cures at Lourdes should "submit to a proper process", in other words, to be rigorously investigated. At his instigation, the current Lourdes Medical Bureau was formed.

== Current administration ==
The bureau is led by a single doctor. The current head is Dr. Alessandro de Franciscis. The bureau has a modest office within the Domain (the large area of consecrated ground surrounding the shrine and owned by the Church), on the second floor of the building known as the Accueil Jean Paul II.

Any doctors practicing in or visiting Lourdes may apply to become members of the Lourdes Medical Bureau. Additionally, nurses, physiotherapists, pharmacists and members of other allied health professions may apply to become members. Members are given (and invited to wear) a small but distinctive badge displaying a red cross on a white background surmounted by the word Credo ("I believe"). However, members of any religious affiliation or none are welcomed.

Members are requested to notify the bureau of any visits which they make to Lourdes.

The Lourdes Medical Bureau publishes its own quarterly journal, Fons Vitae ("Source of Life") which is circulated to members. Additionally, case reports of interest are circulated to members for perusal.

The Medical Bureau is not responsible for the direct medical care of pilgrims and visitors to Lourdes. Legally, the position is that the general practitioners and hospital in Lourdes are responsible for the medical care of anyone visiting Lourdes.

== Investigation of apparent cures ==
Approximately 35 claims per year are brought to the attention of the Lourdes Medical Bureau. Most of these are dismissed quickly. Three to five each year are investigated more thoroughly, by drawing up a Medical Bureau, comprising any doctors who were present in Lourdes at the time the apparent cure took place (this is the rationale for all members to notify the bureau of their visits to Lourdes).

The Medical Bureau investigates the claim, by examining the patient, the casenotes, and any test results (which can include biopsies, X-rays, CT scans, blood test results, and so on).

If this conference decides that further investigation is warranted, the case is referred to the International Lourdes Medical Committee (abbreviated in French to CMIL), which is an international panel of about twenty experts in various medical disciplines and of different religious beliefs. CMIL meets annually. A full investigation requires that one of its members investigates every detail of the case in question, and immerses him/herself in the literature around that condition to ensure that up-to-date academic knowledge is applied to the decision. This investigator may also consult with other colleagues about the case.

This information is presented at a CMIL meeting. Also present at the meeting are the head of the Lourdes Medical Bureau and the Bishop of Tarbes and Lourdes (currently this is Nicolas Brouwet). The cured subject is not normally present.

For a cure to be recognised as medically inexplicable, certain facts require to be established:

- The original diagnosis must be verified and confirmed beyond doubt
- The diagnosis must be regarded as "incurable" with current means (although ongoing treatments do not disqualify the cure)
- The cure must happen in association with a visit to Lourdes, typically while in Lourdes or in the vicinity of the shrine itself (although drinking or bathing in the water are not required)
- The cure must be immediate (rapid resolution of symptoms and signs of the illness)
- The cure must be complete (with no residual impairment or deficit)
- The cure must be permanent (with no recurrence)

CMIL is not entitled to pronounce a cure "miraculous"; this can only be done by the Church. The bureau may only pronounce that a cure is "medically inexplicable". A full investigation takes a minimum of five years (in order to ensure that the cure is permanent), and may take as long as ten or twelve years. It is recognised that, in rare cases, even advanced malignant disease or severe infection may spontaneously resolve, in a full remission.

The CMIL board votes on each case presented. A two-thirds vote is required for CMIL to pronounce a cure "inexplicable".

If CMIL decides a cure is medically inexplicable, the case is referred to the Bishop of the diocese where the cured subject lives. It is he who, in consultation with his own experts and with the Vatican, makes the decision about whether a cure is "miraculous". He may, for whatever reason, refute the claim.

Jacques Perrier, the former Bishop of Tarbes and Lourdes, made a statement concerning the question of miracles in Lourdes. The bishop wishes to have a new approach to cures in Lourdes, especially concerning the different stages of recognising them: "For the Church, as well as for the believer, a pilgrimage to Mary is more than a journey to a miracle. It is a journey of love, of prayer and of the suffering community."

== Notable cases ==
=== Pieter De Rudder ===
Visited Lourdes: After his healing, from 9 to 15 May 1878

Pieter De Rudder was a farm labourer, born Jabbeke July 2, 1822, died March 22, 1898. His recovery from a broken leg (1875) is one of the most famous recognized Lourdes miracles (a bronze cast of his bones is exhibited in the Lourdes Medical Bureau), although it is not supposed to have occurred in Lourdes itself, but in a sanctuary of Our Lady of Lourdes at Oostakker near Ghent (Belgium, East Flanders).

=== Jeanne Fretel ===
Visited Lourdes: 10 May 1948.

Age 31, a student nurse from Rennes, France. Tubercular peritonitis with complications for seven years, extreme emaciation and oscillating fever. Comatose when brought to Lourdes, was given a tiny fragment of the Eucharist and awoke. Reported being "instantly and permanently cured" later that night while lying in her wheelchair beside the spring. She had not yet bathed in or drunk the water. Her cure was recognised officially on 11 November 1950.

=== Brother Léo Schwager ===
Visited Lourdes: 30 April 1952.

Age 28, from Fribourg, Switzerland. Multiple sclerosis for five years. His cure was recognised on 18 December 1960.

=== Alice Couteault, born Alice Gourdon ===
Visited Lourdes: 15 May 1952.

Age 34, from Bouille-Loretz, France. Multiple sclerosis for three years. Her cure was recognised on 16 July 1956.

=== Marie Bigot ===
Visited Lourdes: 8 October 1953 and 10 October 1954.

Age 32, from La Richardais, France. Arachnoiditis of posterior cranial fossa (blindness, deafness, hemiplegia). Her cure was recognised on 15 August 1956.

=== Ginette Nouvel, born Ginette Fabre ===
Visited Lourdes: 21 September 1954.

Age 26, from Carmaux, France. Budd–Chiari syndrome (supra-hepatic venous thrombosis). Her cure was recognised on 31 May 1963.

=== Elisa Aloi, later Elisa Varcalli ===
Visited Lourdes: 5 June 1958.

Age 27, from Patti, Sicily. Tuberculous osteoarthritis with fistulae at multiple sites in the right leg. Her cure was recognised on 26 May 1965.

=== Juliette Tamburini ===
Visited Lourdes: 17 July 1959.

Age 22, from Marseille, France. Femoral osteoperiostitis with fistulae, epistaxis, for ten years. Her cure was recognised on 11 May 1965.

=== Vittorio Micheli ===
Visited Lourdes: 1 June 1963.

Age 23, from Scurelle, Italy. Sarcoma (cancer) of pelvis; tumour so large that his left thigh became loose from the socket, leaving his left leg limp and paralysed. After taking the waters, he was free of pain and could walk. By February 1964 the tumour was gone, the hip joint had recalcified, and he returned to a normal life. His cure was recognized on 26 May 1976.

=== Serge Perrin ===
Visited Lourdes: 1 May 1970.

Age 41, from Le Lion-d'Angers, France. Recurrent right hemiplegia, with ocular lesions, due to bilateral carotid artery disorders. Symptoms, which included headache, impaired speech and vision, and partial right-side paralysis began without warning in February 1964. During the next six years he became a wheelchair user, and nearly blind. While on pilgrimage to Lourdes in April 1970, he felt a sudden warmth from head to toe, his vision returned, and he was able to walk unaided. His cure was recognised on 17 June 1978.

=== Delizia Cirolli, later Delizia Costa ===
Visited Lourdes: 24 December 1976.

Age 12, from Paterno, Sicily. Ewing's sarcoma of right knee. Offered amputation by her doctors, her mother refused and took her to Lourdes instead. On returning to Italy, her tumour rapidly regressed until no remaining evidence existed, although it left her tibia angulated, which required an operation (osteotomy) to correct. Her cure was recognised on 28 June 1989. She went on to become a nurse.

=== Jean-Pierre Bély ===
Visited Lourdes: 9 October 1987.

Age 51, French. Multiple sclerosis. His cure was recognised on 9 February 1999.

== Physicians ==
=== Patrick Theillier ===
Dr. Patrick Theillier was the twelfth doctor to head the Lourdes Medical Bureau. He received his medical degree from Lille in 1964. He was head of the Bureau from 1998 until his retirement in 2009.

=== Alessandro di Franciscis ===
Italian-American paediatrician Dr. Alessandro ("Sandro") di Franciscis (born Naples, 1955) is the thirteenth doctor to head the Lourdes Medical Bureau, and the first non-Frenchman in that position. He succeeded Dr. Theillier on 10 February 2009 and was appointed by Bishop Jacques Perrier. Dr. di Franciscis has a master's degree in epidemiology from Harvard, and has pursued a political as well as a medical career. He is American on his mother's side and speaks 5 languages.

== Skeptical reception ==
Skeptical responses often claim that auto-suggestion and the placebo effect are the cause of those healings after pilgrimage to the sanctuary.

The methodological procedures of the bureau (which is also subservient to the Catholic Church) have received numerous criticisms over the years, and the healings considered to be a "neuropsychiatric phenomenon". Some have coined the Lourdes effect to describe how none of the healings have involved dramatic, unambiguous events like growing back a limb but inconclusive and opaque results.

According to James Randi, in his book The Faith Healers:

Serge Perrin, 41 years old, claimed that he had recovered from "recurring organic hemiplegia" (paralysis of one side of the body) and recurring blindness in one eye. The Lourdes medical team declared the case "miraculous." But an American team examined the data and discovered that the necessary tests—a spinal tap and a brain scan—had not been done to properly establish the cause of the condition. In fact, the American doctors said, Perrin's symptoms are classic signs of hysteria; in the absence of appropriate medical tests, that was a much more probable diagnosis. Furthermore, hysteria is known to respond favorably to highly emotional circumstances like those encountered at religious ceremonies... If Serge Perrin's case is representative, there are good reasons to be distrustful of officially declared miraculous cures at Lourdes.

== Scientific analysis ==
A study by former Emeritus Professor Bernard Francis et al in Journal of the History of Medicine and Allied Sciences looked at the evidence of the cures. It found that while there were some cases associated with hysteria and mental disorders, there were others that were clearly anatomical abnormalities visible to the eye, including tumours and open wounds. It also noted other diseases like tuberculosis and multiple sclerosis. His investigations found that many of the people cured of their medical issues remained cured and didn't relapse. It noted there was no obvious explanation for the cures: "Although uncommon, the miraculous cures are evidence of somatic and mental processes we do not know." However, they also surmise that "autosuggestion and the placebo effect played a role in a number of improvements and allegations of cures."
