= Faith healing =

Prayer and gestures perceived to bring divine intervention in physical healing

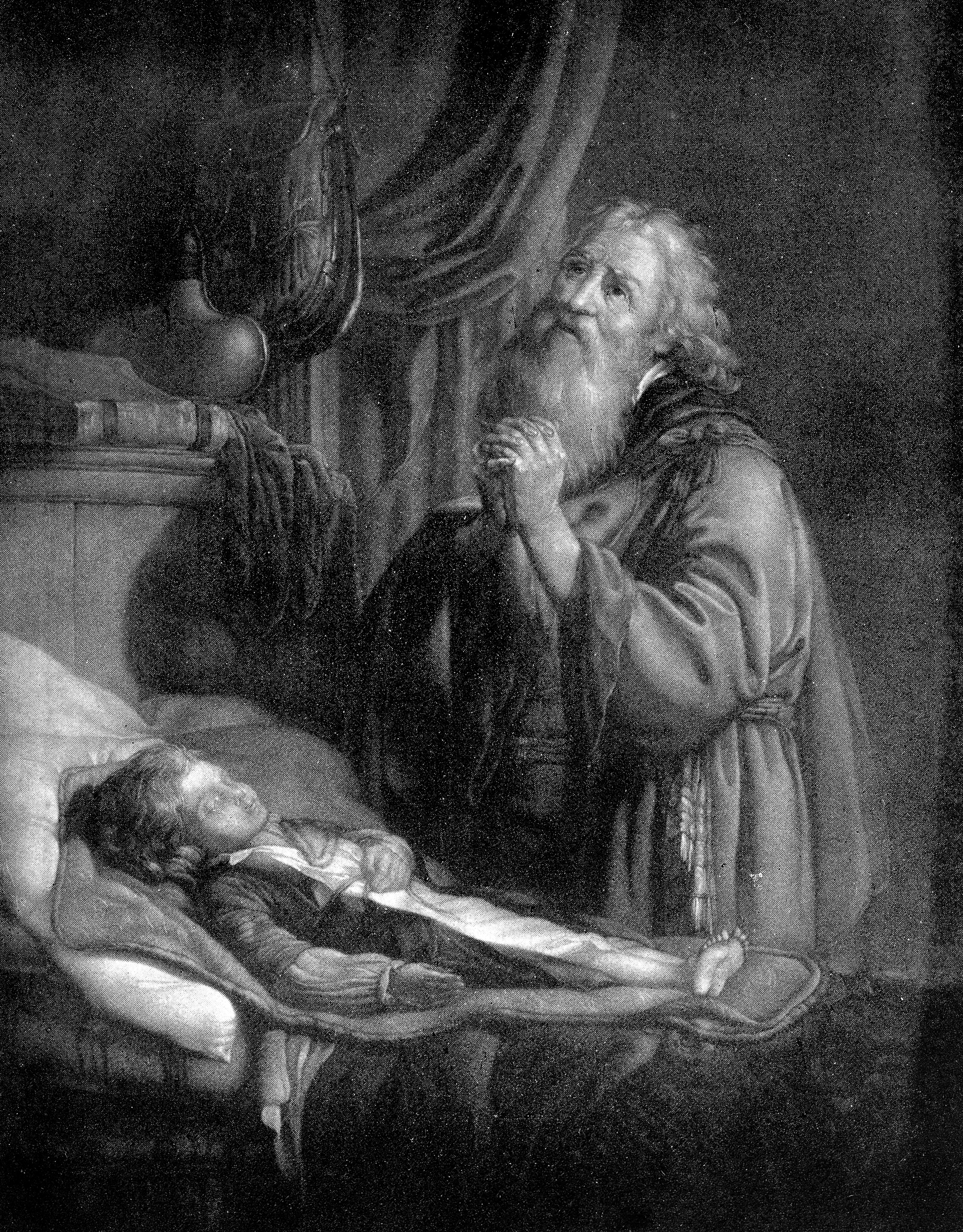
The prophet Elijah praying for the recovery of the son of the widow of Zarephath, from the Bible's Books of Kings

Faith healing is the superstitious practice of prayer and gestures (such as laying on of hands) that are believed by some to elicit divine intervention in spiritual and physical healing, especially the Christian practice. Believers assert that the healing of disease and disability can be brought about by religious faith through prayer or other rituals that, according to adherents, can stimulate a divine presence and power. Religious belief in divine intervention does not depend on empirical evidence of an evidence-based outcome achieved via faith healing. Virtually all (Note: "Despite the lack of generally accepted demarcation criteria, we find remarkable agreement among virtually all philosophers and scientists that fields like astrology, creationism, homeopathy, dowsing, psychokinesis, faith healing, clairvoyance, or ufology are either pseudosciences or at least lack the epistemic warrant to be taken seriously." Martin Mahner, 2013.) scientists and philosophers dismiss faith healing as pseudoscience.

Claims that "a myriad of techniques" such as prayer, divine intervention, or the ministrations of an individual healer can cure illness have been popular throughout history. There have been claims that faith can cure blindness, deafness, cancer, HIV/AIDS, developmental disorders, anemia, arthritis, corns, defective speech, multiple sclerosis, skin rashes, total body paralysis, and various injuries. Recoveries have been attributed to many techniques commonly classified as faith healing. It can involve prayer, a visit to a religious shrine, or simply a strong belief in a supreme being.

Many Christians interpret the Christian Bible, especially the New Testament, as teaching belief in, and the practice of, faith healing. According to a 2004 Newsweek poll, 72 percent of Americans said they believe that praying to God can cure someone, even if science says the person has an incurable disease. Unlike faith healing, advocates of spiritual healing make no attempt to seek divine intervention, instead believing in divine energy. The increased interest in alternative medicine at the end of the 20th century has given rise to a parallel interest among sociologists in the relationship of religion to health.

Faith healing can be classified as a spiritual, supernatural, or paranormal topic, and, in some cases, belief in faith healing can be classified as magical thinking. The American Cancer Society states "available scientific evidence does not support claims that faith healing can actually cure physical ailments". "Death, disability, and other unwanted outcomes have occurred when faith healing was elected instead of medical care for serious injuries or illnesses." When parents have practiced faith healing but not medical care, many children have died that otherwise would have been expected to live. Similar results are found in adults.

== In various belief systems ==
=== Christianity ===
==== Overview ====
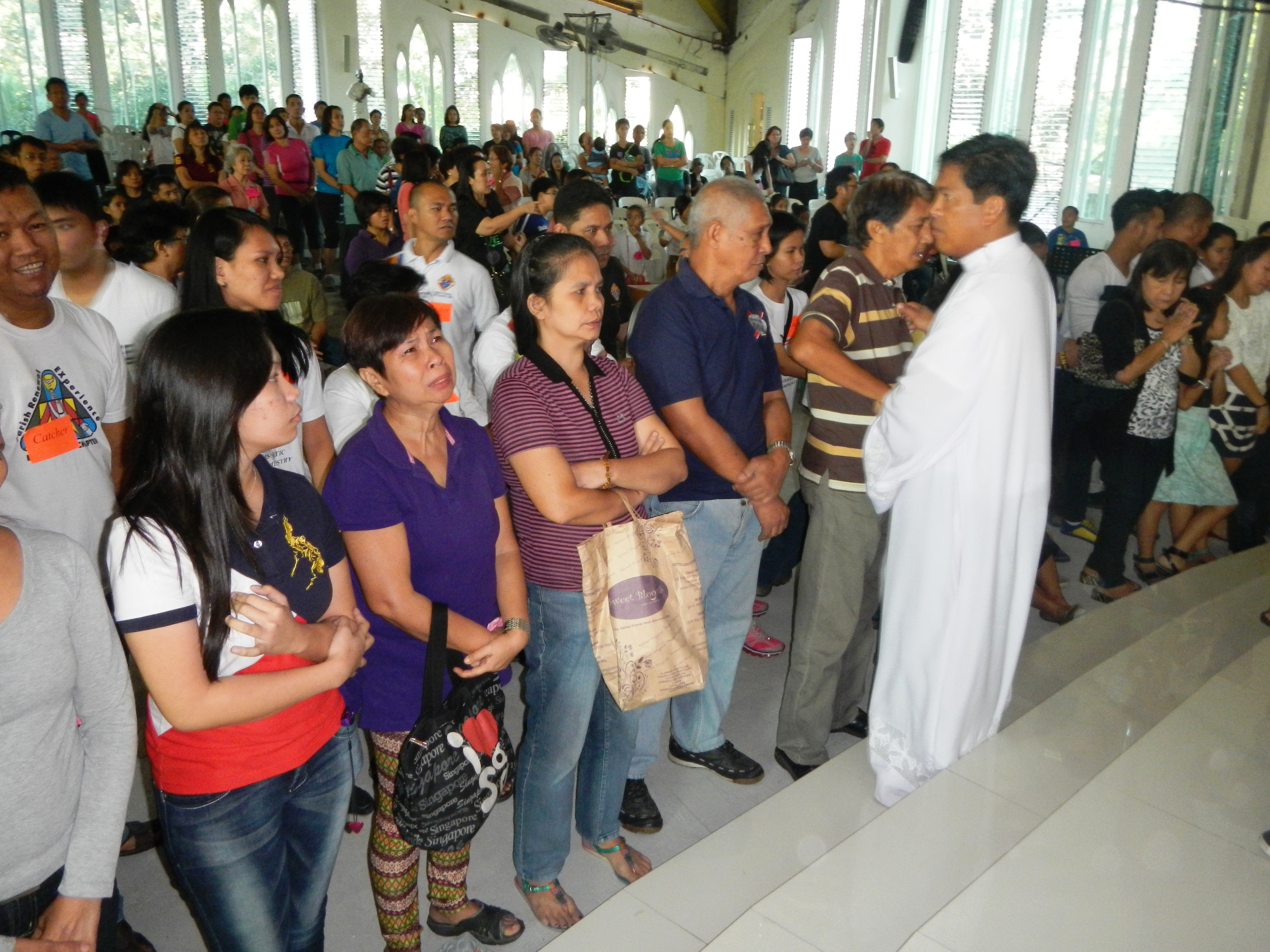
Faith healing by Fernando Suarez, Philippines

Regarded as a Christian belief that God heals people through the power of the Holy Spirit, faith healing often involves the laying on of hands. It is also called supernatural healing, divine healing, and miracle healing, among other things. Healing in the Christian Bible is often associated with the ministry of specific individuals, including Elijah, Jesus, and Paul of Tarsus.

Christian physician Reginald B. Cherry views faith healing as a pathway of healing in which God uses both the natural and the supernatural to heal. Being healed has been described as a privilege of accepting Jesus's redemption on the cross. Pentecostal writer Wilfred Graves Jr. views the healing of the body as a physical expression of salvation. After relating a story of Jesus's exorcising an individual and healing ill individuals who approached him, the author of the book of Matthew states that the miracles were a fulfillment of a prophecy from Isaiah 53:5.

Christian writers who believe in faith healing do not necessarily believe that an individual's faith presently brings about the desired healing. "[Y]our faith does not effect your healing now. When you are healed rests entirely on what the sovereign purposes of the Healer are," argues Larry Keefauver. Keefauver cautions against allowing enthusiasm for faith healing to stir up false hopes: "Just believing hard enough, long enough or strong enough will not strengthen you or prompt your healing. Doing mental gymnastics to 'hold on to your miracle' will not cause your healing to manifest now." Those who actively lay hands on others and pray with them to be healed are usually aware that healing may not always follow immediately. Proponents of faith healing argue that it may come later, if at all, in this life. Keefauver argues that "the truth is that your healing may manifest in eternity, not in time".

==== New Testament ====
The New Testament relates that it was only after Jesus healed a blind man that his status was recognized, argues Bart D. Ehrman. Four of the seven miracles performed in the book of John that the author uses to indicate that Jesus was sent from God were acts of healing or resurrection. Jesus heals a Capernaumite official's son, heals a paralyzed man by a pool in Bethsaida, heals a man born blind, and resurrects Lazarus of Bethany.

Jesus told his followers to heal the sick and stated that signs such as healing are evidence of faith. The apostle Paul believed healing is one of the special gifts of the Holy Spirit, and that the possibility exists that certain persons may possess this gift to an extraordinarily high degree. The New Testament says that during Jesus's ministry and after his Resurrection, the apostles healed the sick and cast out demons, made lame men walk, raised the dead and performed other miracles. The apostles are described as men given supernatural powers by God, including the ability to heal. For example, in the book of Acts 3:1–10, Saint Peter is recounted healing a disabled man.

==== Early Christian church ====
Accounts or references to healing appear in the writings of many Ante-Nicene Fathers, although many of these mentions are very general and do not include specifics.

==== Catholicism ====
The Roman Catholic Church recognizes two "not mutually exclusive" kinds of healing, one justified by science and one justified by faith:

- healing by human "natural means [...] through the practice of medicine" which emphasizes that the theological virtue of "charity demands that we not neglect natural means of healing people who are ill" and the cardinal virtue of prudence forewarns not "to employ a technique that has no scientific support (or even plausibility)".
- healing by divine grace "interceded on behalf of the sick through the invocation of the name of the Lord Jesus, asking for healing through the power of the Holy Spirit, whether in the form of the sacramental laying on of hands and anointing with oil or of simple prayers for healing, which often include an appeal to the saints for their aid".

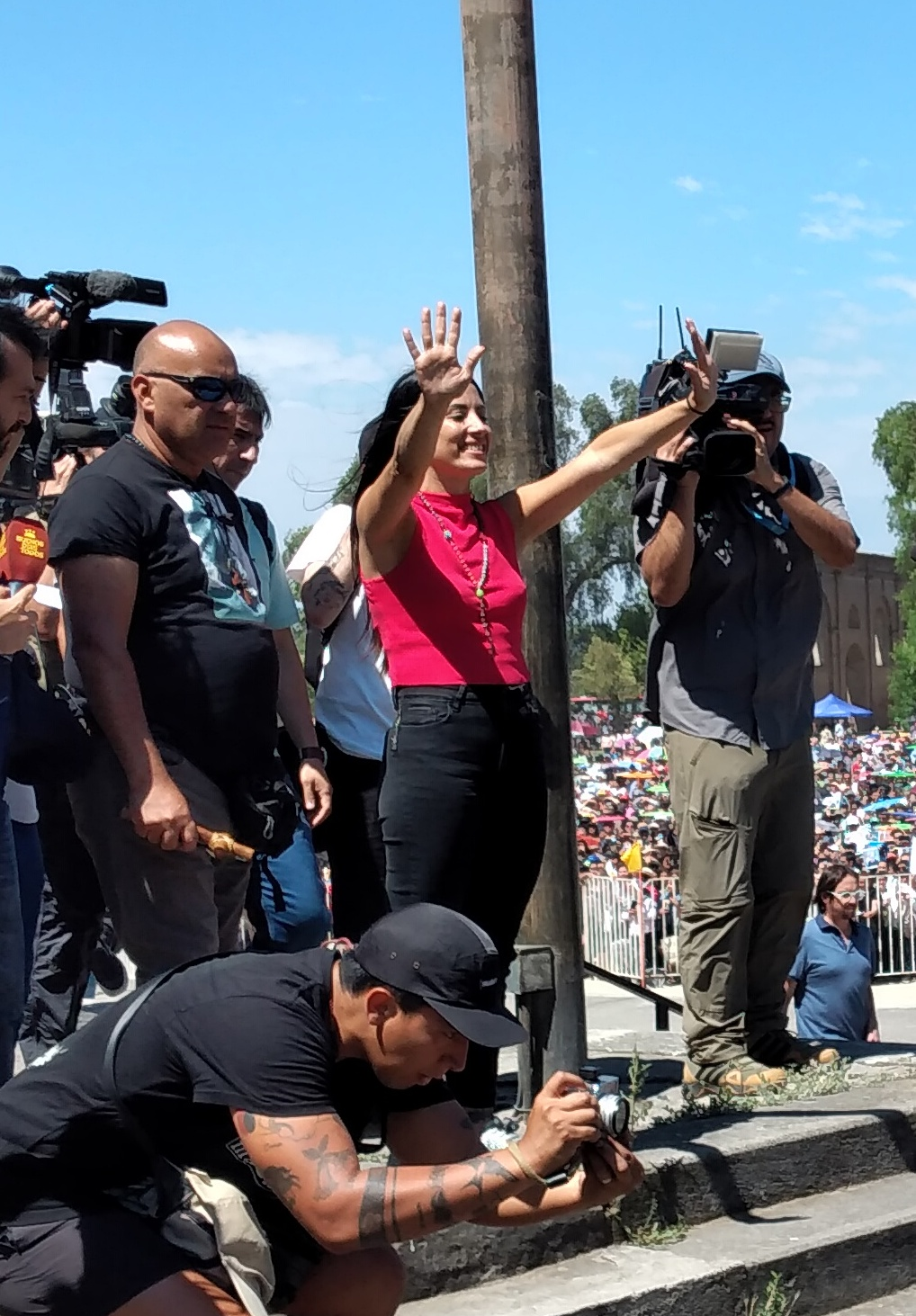
The charismatic Catholic faith healer Leda Bergonzi has drawn tens of thousands of followers, but in 2024, she was prohibited from practicing the laying on of hands in her home town of Rosario, Argentina.

The Catechism of the Catholic Church states that "the Holy Spirit gives to some a special charism of healing" but also that "the most intense prayers do not always obtain the healing of all illnesses" by which it cites Paul the Apostle as a biblical example of someone who found meaning in their own suffering.

In 2000, the Congregation for the Doctrine of the Faith issued "Instruction on prayers for healing," with specific norms regarding prayer meetings for healing, which presents the Catholic Church's doctrines on sickness and healing.

It accepts "that there may be means of natural healing that have not yet been understood or recognized by science", (Note: According to a Catholic Encyclopedia article about psychotherapy from 1911, the application of scientific principles has probably been the responsible cause of more faith cures than anything else. Faith in a scientific discovery acts through the mind of a patient to bring about an improvement of symptoms, if not a cure of the disease. The patients who are cured usually suffer from chronic conditions, they either have only a persuasion that they are ill or have some physical ailment, but the patients inhibit through solicitude and worry the natural forces that would bring about a cure. This inhibition cannot be lifted until the mind is relieved by confidence in a remedy or scientific discovery that gives them a conviction of cure.) but it rejects superstitious practices which are neither compatible with Christian teaching nor compatible with scientific evidence.

Faith healing is reported by Catholics as the result of intercessory prayer to a saint or to a person with the gift of healing. According to U.S. Catholic magazine, "Even in this skeptical, postmodern, scientific age – miracles really are possible." According to a Newsweek poll, three-fourths of American Catholics say they pray for "miracles" of some sort.

According to John Cavadini, when healing is granted, "The miracle is not primarily for the person healed, but for all people, as a sign of God's work in the ultimate healing called 'salvation', or a sign of the kingdom that is coming." Some might view their own healing as a sign they are particularly worthy or holy, while others do not deserve it.

The Catholic Church has a special Congregation dedicated to the careful investigation of the validity of alleged miracles attributed to prospective saints. Pope Francis tightened the rules on money and miracles in the canonization process. Since Catholic Christians believe the lives of canonized saints in the Church will reflect Christ's, many have come to expect healing miracles. While the popular conception of a miracle can be wide-ranging, the Catholic Church has a specific definition for the kind of miracle formally recognized in a canonization process.

According to Catholic Encyclopedia, it is often said that cures at shrines and during Christian pilgrimages are mainly due to psychotherapy – partly to confident trust in Divine providence, and partly to the strong expectancy of cure that comes over suggestible persons at these times and places. (Note: A pre-1911 analysis of the records of cures shows that the majority of accepted cures have been in patients suffering from demonstrable physical conditions.)

Among the best-known accounts by Catholics of faith healings are those attributed to the miraculous intercession of the apparition of the Blessed Virgin Mary known as Our Lady of Lourdes at the Sanctuary of Our Lady of Lourdes in France and the remissions of life-threatening disease claimed by those who have applied for aid to Saint Jude, who is known as the "patron saint of lost causes".

As of 2004, Catholic medics have asserted that there have been 67 miracles and 7,000 unexplainable medical cures at Lourdes since 1858. In a 1908 book, it says these cures were subjected to intense medical scrutiny and were only recognized as authentic spiritual cures after a commission of doctors and scientists, called the Lourdes Medical Bureau, had ruled out any physical mechanism for the patient's recovery.

==== Evangelicalism ====
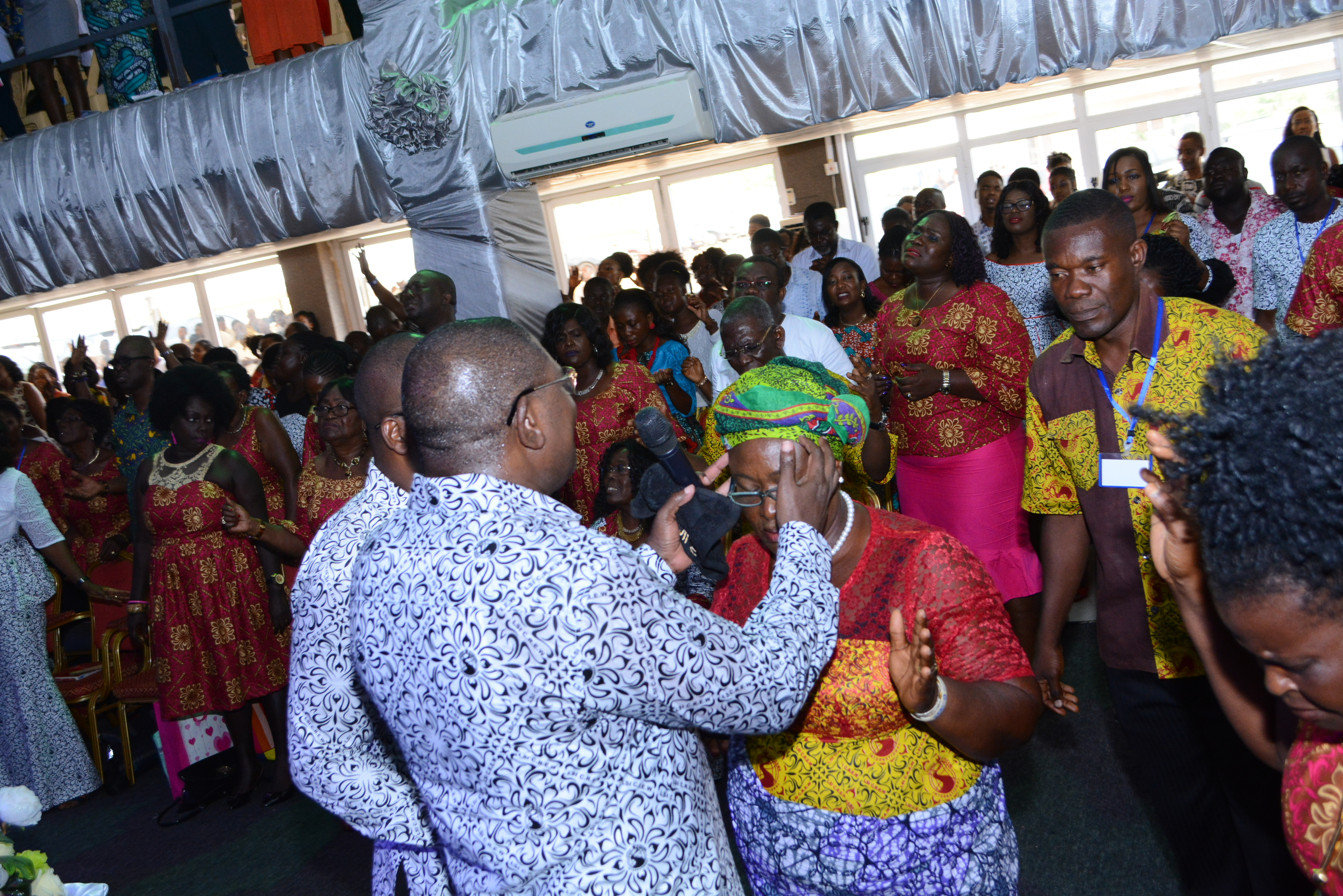
Laying on of hands for healing in Living Streams International Church, Accra, Ghana, 2018

In some Pentecostal and Charismatic Evangelical churches, a special place is thus reserved for faith healings with laying on of hands during worship services or for campaigns of evangelization. Faith healing or divine healing is considered to be an inheritance of Jesus acquired by his death and resurrection. Biblical inerrancy asserts that the miracles and healings described in the Bible are possible, and therefore may be believed to be still relevant and present in the life of the believer.

At the beginning of the 20th century, the new Pentecostal movement drew participants from the Holiness movement and other movements in America that already believed in divine healing. By the 1930s, several faith healers drew large crowds and established worldwide followings.

The first Pentecostals in the modern sense appeared in Topeka, Kansas, in a Bible school conducted by Charles Fox Parham, a holiness teacher and former Methodist pastor. Pentecostalism achieved worldwide attention in 1906 through the Azusa Street Revival in Los Angeles led by William Joseph Seymour.

Smith Wigglesworth was also a well-known figure in the early 20th century. A former English plumber turned evangelist, Wigglesworth lived simply and read nothing but the Bible from the time his wife taught him to read. He traveled around the world preaching about Jesus and performing faith healings. Wigglesworth claimed to raise several people from the dead in Jesus' name in his meetings.

During the 1920s and 1930s, Aimee Semple McPherson was a controversial faith healer of growing popularity during the Great Depression. Subsequently, William M. Branham has been credited with initiating the post-World War II healing revivals. The healing revival he began led many to emulate his style and spawned a generation of faith healers. Because of this, Branham has been recognized as the "father of modern faith healers". According to writer and researcher Patsy Sims, "the power of a Branham service and his stage presence remains a legend unparalleled in the history of the Charismatic movement". By the late 1940s, Oral Roberts, who was associated with and promoted by Branham's Voice of Healing magazine also became well known, and he continued with faith healing until the 1980s. Roberts discounted faith healing in the late 1950s, stating, "I never was a faith healer and I was never raised that way. My parents believed very strongly in medical science and we have a doctor who takes care of our children when they get sick. I cannot heal anyone – God does that." A friend of Roberts was Kathryn Kuhlman, another popular faith healer, who gained fame in the 1950s and had a television program on CBS. Also in this era, Jack Coe and A. A. Allen were faith healers who traveled with large tents for large open-air crusades.

Oral Roberts's successful use of television as a medium to gain a wider audience led others to follow suit. His former pilot, Kenneth Copeland, started a healing ministry. Pat Robertson, Benny Hinn, and Peter Popoff became well-known televangelists who claimed to heal the sick. Richard Rossi is known for advertising his healing clinics through secular television and radio. Kuhlman influenced Benny Hinn, who adopted some of her techniques and wrote a book about her.

==== Christian Science ====
Christian Science claims that healing is possible through prayer based on an understanding of God and the underlying spiritual perfection of God's creation. The material world as humanly perceived is believed not to be the spiritual reality. Christian Scientists believe that healing through prayer is possible insofar as it brings the spiritual reality of health into human experience. Prayer does not change the spiritual creation but gives a clearer view of it, and the result appears in the human scene as healing: the human picture adjusts to coincide more nearly with the divine reality. Therefore, Christian Scientists do not consider themselves to be faith healers since faith or belief in Christian Science is not required on the part of the patient, and because they consider healings reliable and provable rather than random.

Although there is no hierarchy in Christian Science, practitioners devote themselves full-time to prayer for others on a professional basis and advertise in an online directory published by the church. Christian Scientists sometimes tell their stories of healing at weekly testimony meetings at local Christian Science churches, or publish them in the church's magazines including The Christian Science Journal printed monthly since 1883, the Christian Science Sentinel printed weekly since 1898, and The Herald of Christian Science a foreign language magazine beginning with a German edition in 1903 and later expanding to Spanish, French, and Portuguese editions. Christian Science Reading Rooms often have archives of such healing accounts.

==== The Church of Jesus Christ of Latter-day Saints ====
The Church of Jesus Christ of Latter-day Saints (LDS) has had a long history of faith healings. Many members of the LDS Church have told their stories of healing within the LDS publication, the Ensign. The church believes healings come most often as a result of priesthood blessings given by the laying on of hands; however, prayer often accompanied with fasting is also thought to cause healings. Healing is always attributed to God's power. Latter-day Saints believe that the Priesthood of God, held by prophets (such as Moses) and worthy disciples of the Savior, was restored via heavenly messengers to the first prophet of this dispensation, Joseph Smith.

According to LDS doctrine, even though members may have the restored priesthood authority to heal in the name of Jesus Christ, all efforts should be made to seek the appropriate medical help. Brigham Young stated this effectively, while also noting that the ultimate outcome is still dependent on the will of God.

If we are sick, and ask the Lord to heal us, and to do all for us that is necessary to be done, according to my understanding of the Gospel of salvation, I might as well ask the Lord to cause my wheat and corn to grow, without my plowing the ground and casting in the seed. It appears consistent to me to apply every remedy that comes within the range of my knowledge, and to ask my Father in Heaven, in the name of Jesus Christ, to sanctify that application to the healing of my body.

But suppose we were traveling in the mountains, ... and one or two were taken sick, without anything in the world in the shape of healing medicine within our reach, what should we do? According to my faith, ask the Lord Almighty to ... heal the sick. This is our privilege, when so situated that we cannot get anything to help ourselves. Then the Lord and his servants can do all. But it is my duty to do, when I have it in my power.

We lay hands on the sick and wish them to be healed, and pray the Lord to heal them, but we cannot always say that he will.

=== Islam ===
A number of healing traditions exist among Muslims. Some healers are particularly focused on diagnosing cases of possession by jinn or demons.

=== Buddhism ===
Chinese-born Australian businessman Jun Hong Lu was a prominent proponent of the "Guan Yin Citta Dharma Door", claiming that practicing the three "golden practices" of reciting texts and mantras, liberation of beings, and making vows, laid a solid foundation for improved physical, mental, and psychological well-being, with many followers publicly attesting to have been healed through practice.

=== Ancient Greek paganism ===
The Ancient Greeks believed in several forms of divine healing. Religious healing of bodily illnesses was usually sought at temples of Asclepius, god of medicine, where patients would, after purifying ritual and prayer, sleep in the temple; of the people supposedly cured thereby, some were healed immediately, but often they would have a dream in which the god came to them and prescribed a treatment, which might be mundanely medical (e.g., a change of diet) or ritual. In the archaic period there were also priests of Apollo who supposedly cured plagues. However, religious healing was applied especially to mental illness, which was thought of as sent by a god and therefore curable by appeasing that god; the gods appealed to were most commonly Dionysus, or Cybele and the Korybantes, but might also include Hecate, Poseidon, Apollo, Ares, Pan, or the heroes. Such religious cures, especially those invoking the Korybantes, often involved special hymns, music, and dancing.

=== Scientology ===
Some critics of Scientology have referred to some of its practices as being similar to faith healing, based on claims made by L. Ron Hubbard in Dianetics: The Modern Science of Mental Health and other writings.

== Scientific investigation ==
Nearly all scientists dismiss faith healing as pseudoscience. Believers assert that faith healing makes no scientific claims and thus should be treated as a matter of faith that is not testable by science. Critics reply that claims of medical cures should be tested scientifically because, although faith in the supernatural is not in itself usually considered to be the purview of science, (Note: "The "faith" in faith healing refers to an irrational belief, unsupported by evidence, that mysterious supernatural powers can eradicate disease. Science deals with evidence, not faith." Bruce Flamm, 2004.) claims of reproducible effects are nevertheless subject to scientific investigation.

Scientists and doctors generally find that faith healing lacks biological plausibility or epistemic warrant, which is one of the criteria used to judge whether clinical research is ethical and financially justified. A Cochrane review of intercessory prayer found "although some of the results of individual studies suggest a positive effect of intercessory prayer, the majority do not". The authors concluded: "We are not convinced that further trials of this intervention should be undertaken and would prefer to see any resources available for such a trial used to investigate other questions in health care".

A review in 1954 investigated spiritual healing, therapeutic touch and faith healing. Of the hundred cases reviewed, none revealed that the healer's intervention alone resulted in any improvement or cure of a measurable organic disability.

In addition, at least one study has suggested that adult Christian Scientists, who generally use prayer rather than medical care, have a higher death rate than other people of the same age.

== Criticism ==
I have visited Lourdes in France and Fatima in Portugal, healing shrines of the Christian Virgin Mary. I have also visited Epidaurus in Greece and Pergamum in Turkey, healing shrines of the pagan god Asklepios. The miraculous healings recorded in both places were remarkably the same. There are, for example, many crutches hanging in the grotto of Lourdes, mute witness to those who arrived lame and left whole. There are, however, no prosthetic limbs among them, no witnesses to paraplegics whose lost limbs were restored.

— John Dominic Crossan

Skeptics of faith healing offer primarily two explanations for anecdotes of cures or improvements, relieving any need to appeal to the supernatural. (Note: "Benefits may result because of the natural progression of the illness, rarely but regularly occurring spontaneous remission or through the placebo effect." UC San Diego Moores Cancer Center) The first is post hoc ergo propter hoc, meaning that a genuine improvement or spontaneous remission may have been experienced coincidental with but independent from anything the faith healer or patient did or said. These patients would have improved just as well even had they done nothing. The second is the placebo effect, through which a person may experience genuine pain relief and other symptomatic alleviation. In this case, the patient genuinely has been helped by the faith healer or faith-based remedy, not through any mysterious or numinous function, but by the power of their own belief that they would be healed. (Note: "Patients who seek the assistance of a faith healer must believe strongly in the healer's divine gifts and ability to focus them on the ill." UC San Diego Moores Cancer Center) In both cases the patient may experience a real reduction in symptoms, though in neither case has anything miraculous or inexplicable occurred. Both cases, however, are strictly limited to the body's natural abilities.

According to the American Cancer Society:

... available scientific evidence does not support claims that faith healing can actually cure physical ailments... One review published in 1998 looked at 172 cases of deaths among children treated by faith healing instead of conventional methods. These researchers estimated that if conventional treatment had been given, the survival rate for most of these children would have been more than 90 percent, with the remainder of the children also having a good chance of survival. A more recent study found that more than 200 children had died of treatable illnesses in the United States over the past thirty years because their parents relied on spiritual healing rather than conventional medical treatment.

The American Medical Association considers that prayer as therapy should not be a medically reimbursable or deductible expense.

Belgian philosopher and skeptic Etienne Vermeersch coined the term Lourdes effect as a criticism of the magical thinking and placebo effect possibilities for the claimed miraculous cures as there are no documented events where a severed arm has been reattached through faith healing at Lourdes. Vermeersch identifies ambiguity and equivocal nature of the miraculous cures as a key feature of miraculous events.

=== Negative impact on public health ===
Reliance on faith healing to the exclusion of other forms of treatment can have a public health impact when it reduces or eliminates access to modern medical techniques. (Note: "Faith healing can cause patients to shun effective medical care". Bruce Flamm) (Note: "It is often claimed that faith healing may not work but at least does no harm. In fact, reliance on faith healing can cause serious harm and even death." Bruce Flamm) (Note: "Faith-healers take from their subjects any hope of managing on their own. And they may very well take them away from legitimate treatments that could really help them." James Randi) This is evident in both higher mortality rates for children and in reduced life expectancy for adults. Critics have also made note of serious injury that has resulted from falsely labelled "healings", where patients erroneously consider themselves cured and cease or withdraw from treatment. (Note: "These [discarded medications] are substances without which those people might well die."James Randi) For example, at least six people have died after faith healing by their church and being told they had been healed of HIV and could stop taking their medications. It is the stated position of the AMA that "prayer as therapy should not delay access to traditional medical care". Choosing faith healing while rejecting modern medicine can and does cause people to die needlessly.

=== Christian theological criticism of faith healing ===
Christian theological criticism of faith healing broadly falls into two distinct levels of disagreement.

The first is widely termed the "open-but-cautious" view of the miraculous in the church today. This term is deliberately used by Robert L. Saucy in the book Are Miraculous Gifts for Today?. Don Carson is another example of a Christian teacher who has put forward what has been described as an "open-but-cautious" view. In dealing with the claims of Warfield, particularly "Warfield's insistence that miracles ceased", Carson asserts, "But this argument stands up only if such miraculous gifts are theologically tied exclusively to a role of attestation; and that is demonstrably not so." However, while affirming that he does not expect healing to happen today, Carson is critical of aspects of the faith healing movement, "Another issue is that of immense abuses in healing practises.... The most common form of abuse is the view that since all illness is directly or indirectly attributable to the devil and his works, and since Christ by his cross has defeated the devil, and by his Spirit has given us the power to overcome him, healing is the inheritance right of all true Christians who call upon the Lord with genuine faith."

The second level of theological disagreement with Christian faith healing goes further. Commonly referred to as cessationism, its adherents either claim that faith healing will not happen today at all, or may happen today, but it would be unusual. Richard Gaffin argues for a form of cessationism in an essay alongside Saucy's in the book Are Miraculous Gifts for Today? In his book Perspectives on Pentecost Gaffin states of healing and related gifts that "the conclusion to be drawn is that as listed in 1 Corinthians 12(vv. 9f., 29f.) and encountered throughout the narrative in Acts, these gifts, particularly when exercised regularly by a given individual, are part of the foundational structure of the church... and so have passed out of the life of the church." Gaffin qualifies this, however, by saying "At the same time, however, the sovereign will and power of God today to heal the sick, particularly in response to prayer (see e.g. James 5:14, 15), ought to be acknowledged and insisted on."

According to the Catholic apologist Trent Horn, while the Bible teaches believers to pray when they are sick, this is not to be viewed as an exclusion of medical care, citing Sirach 38:9,12-14:

"when you are sick do not be negligent, but pray to the Lord, and he will heal you...And give the physician his place, for the Lord created him; let him not leave you, for there is need of him. There is a time when success lies in the hands of physicians, for they too will pray to the Lord, that he should grant them success in diagnosis and in healing, for the sake of preserving life."

=== Fraud ===
Skeptics of faith healers point to fraudulent practices either in the healings themselves (such as plants in the audience with fake illnesses), or concurrent with the healing work supposedly taking place and claim that faith healing is a quack practice in which the "healers" use well known non-supernatural illusions to exploit credulous people in order to obtain their gratitude, confidence and money. James Randi's The Faith Healers investigates Christian evangelists such as Peter Popoff, who claimed to heal sick people on stage in front of an audience. Popoff pretended to know private details about participants' lives by receiving radio transmissions from his wife who was off-stage and had gathered information from audience members prior to the show. According to this book, many of the leading modern evangelistic healers have engaged in deception and fraud. The book also questioned how faith healers use funds that were sent to them for specific purposes. (Note: "[Some] faith-healers have been less than careful in their use of funds sent to them for specific purposes."James Randi) Physicist Robert L. Park and doctor and consumer advocate Stephen Barrett have called into question the ethics of some exorbitant fees.

There have also been legal controversies. For example, in 1955 at a Jack Coe revival service in Miami, Florida, Coe told the parents of a three-year-old boy that he healed their son who had polio. Coe then told the parents to remove the boy's leg braces. However, their son was not cured of polio and removing the braces left the boy in constant pain. As a result, through the efforts of Joseph L. Lewis, Coe was arrested and charged on February 6, 1956, with practicing medicine without a license, a felony in the state of Florida. A Florida Justice of the Peace dismissed the case on grounds that Florida exempts divine healing from the law. Later that year Coe was diagnosed with bulbar polio, and died a few weeks later at Dallas' Parkland Hospital on December 17, 1956.

=== Miracles for sale ===
TV personality Derren Brown produced a show on faith healing entitled Miracles for Sale which arguably exposed the art of faith healing as a scam. In this show, Derren trained a scuba diver trainer picked from the general public to be a faith healer and took him to Texas to successfully deliver a faith healing session to a congregation.

== United States law ==
The 1974 Child Abuse Prevention and Treatment Act (CAPTA) required states to grant religious exemptions to child neglect and child abuse laws in order to receive federal money. The CAPTA amendments of 1996 42 U.S.C. § 5106i state:

(a) In General. – Nothing in this Act shall be construed –

"(1) as establishing a Federal requirement that a parent or legal guardian provide a child any medical service or treatment against the religious beliefs of the parent or legal guardian; and "(2) to require that a State find, or to prohibit a State from finding, abuse or neglect in cases in which a parent or legal guardian relies solely or partially upon spiritual means rather than medical treatment, in accordance with the religious beliefs of the parent or legal guardian.

"(b) State Requirement. – Notwithstanding subsection (a), a State shall, at a minimum, have in place authority under State law to permit the child protective services system of the State to pursue any legal remedies, including the authority to initiate legal proceedings in a court of competent jurisdiction, to provide medical care or treatment for a child when such care or treatment is necessary to prevent or remedy serious harm to the child, or to prevent the withholding of medically indicated treatment from children with life threatening conditions. Except with respect to the withholding of medically indicated treatments from disabled infants with life threatening conditions, case by case determinations concerning the exercise of the authority of this subsection shall be within the sole discretion of the State.

Thirty-one states have child-abuse religious exemptions. These are Alabama, Alaska, California, Colorado, Delaware, Florida, Georgia, Idaho, Illinois, Indiana, Iowa, Kansas, Kentucky, Louisiana, Maine, Michigan, Minnesota, Mississippi, Missouri, Montana, Nevada, New Hampshire, New Jersey, New Mexico, Ohio, Oklahoma, Oregon, Pennsylvania, Vermont, Virginia, and Wyoming. In six of these states, Arkansas, Idaho, Iowa, Louisiana, Ohio and Virginia, the exemptions extend to murder and manslaughter. Of these, Idaho is the only state accused of having a large number of deaths due to the legislation in recent times. In February 2015, controversy was sparked in Idaho over a bill believed to further reinforce parental rights to deny their children medical care.

=== Criminal convictions related to faith healing ===
Legal obligations to provide medical aid have existed in Anglo-American law since the late 19th century. In 1899, in the case Regina v. Senior, a father and member of the Peculiar People had led 7 of his 12 children to die due to his refusal to call for medical aid. When his 9-month-old suffered from pneumonia, the father called in elders to pray and anoint the baby instead of seeking medical attention and was convicted of manslaughter.

In 1901, a 16-year-old girl from New York contracted whooping cough and suffered the disease for over a month until she developed pneumonia and died after her Christian Catholic father refused to call a physician. He was convicted of a misdemeanor under New York law for willfully refusing to provide medical assistance to a minor.

In 2008, 15-month-old Ava Worthington of Oregon died of bronchial pneumonia and a bloodstream infection after her parents Raylene and Carl Worthington, members of Followers of Christ Church, allowed a cystic growth to grow on her neck for months while anointing her, giving her diluted wine, praying, and fasting over her. Her father was charged with manslaughter and eventually convicted of criminal mistreatment in 2009.

In 2008, 11-year-old Kara Neumann of Wisconsin died of diabetic ketoacidosis stemming from undiagnosed juvenile-onset diabetes after her parents Leilani and Dale Neumann refused to take her to the hospital and prayed over her instead. Both parents, nondenominational Pentecostals, were convicted of second-degree reckless homicide in 2009.

In 2009, newborn David Hickman of Oregon died of staph pneumonia after he was born at home to parents Dale and Shannon Hickman. The Hickmans watched the baby turn gray and struggle to breathe and did not seek medical intervention. Members of the Followers of Christ Church, both Hickmans were convicted of second-degree manslaughter in 2017 and were sentenced 6 years and 3 months in prison.

In 2012, 16-year-old Austin Sprout Creswell of Oregon died of appendicitis after his parents Russel and Brandi Bellew prayed over him over the course of a week while his appendix deteriorated instead of seeking medical treatment. The Bellews, members of the General Assembly and Church of the First Born, pled guilty to criminally negligent homicide in 2012.

In 2013, 12-year-old Syble Rossiter of Oregon died of Type 1 diabetes complications after her parents Travis and Wenona Rossiter refused to treat her condition. Syble's parents, members of the General Assembly and Church of the First Born, were both convicted of manslaughter and sentenced to 10 years in prison in 2014.

In 2022, 8-year-old Elizabeth Struhs of Australia died of diabetic ketoacidosis after her parents Jason and Kerrie Struhs withheld insulin from their daughter for almost a week in accordance with their religious group's principles, choosing to pray and sing for her instead. Jason, Kerrie, and the rest of their religious sect known as The Saints were convicted of manslaughter in 2025.

In 2023, 2-day old Hayden Edwards of Oregon died of acute bilirubin encephalopathy after his parents Blair and Taylor Edwards prayed over him after he suffered intermittent breathing problems over the course of a few hours; instead of seeking medical help, his parents, members of the Followers of Christ Church, prayed over him and anointed him with oil. Both parents pled guilty to criminal mistreatment in 2025.

== See also ==
- Anointing of the sick
- Efficacy of prayer
- Egregore
- Energy medicine
- Folk medicine
- Self-efficacy
- Thaumaturgy
- Witch doctor
- List of ineffective cancer treatments
- List of topics characterized as pseudoscience

== Bibliography ==
- Beyer, Jürgen (2013) "Wunderheilung". In Enzyklopädie des Märchens. Handwörterbuch zur historischen und vergleichenden Erzählforschung, vol. 14, Berlin & Boston: Walter de Gruyter, coll. 1043–1050
- Bosworth, Fred F. (2001) [First published 1924]. Christ, the healer: sermons on divine healing. Grand Rapids, MI: Revell. ISBN 978-0-8007-5739-7.
- Carson, Don (1987). Showing the Spirit: A Theological Exposition of 1 Corinthians 12–14. Grand Rapids, MI: Baker Book House. ISBN 978-0-8010-2521-1.
- Eddy, Mary Baker (1910) [1875]. Science and Health with Key to the Scriptures (Concord Express online ed.). sentinel.christianscience.com.
- Gaffin, Richard (1979). Perspectives on Pentecost: New Testament Teaching on the Gifts of the Holy Spirit. Phillipsburg, NJ: Presbyterian and Reformed Publishing. ISBN 978-0-87552-269-2.
- Hall, Harriet (19 November 2013). "Faith Healing: Religious Freedom vs. Child Protection". Science-Based Medicine.
- Nolen, William (1975). Healing: A Doctor in Search of a Miracle. Random House. ISBN 978-0-394-49095-3.
- Randi, James (1989). The Faith Healers. Prometheus Books. ISBN 978-0-87975-535-5.
- Thomas, Northcote Whitbridge (1911). "Faith healing" . In Chisholm, Hugh (ed.). Encyclopædia Britannica (11th ed.). Cambridge University Press.
- Sims, Patsy (1996). Can Somebody Shout Amen!: Inside the Tents and Tabernacles of American Revivalists. University Press of Kentucky. ISBN 978-0-8131-0886-5.
- Young, Brigham (1941). Discourses of Brigham Young. Selected by Widtsoe, John A.
- Young, Brigham (1997). Teachings of Presidents of the Church: Brigham Young (churchofjesuschrist.org online ed.). The Church of Jesus Christ of Latter-day Saints (LDS). pp. 251–9.
