= Pieter De Rudder =

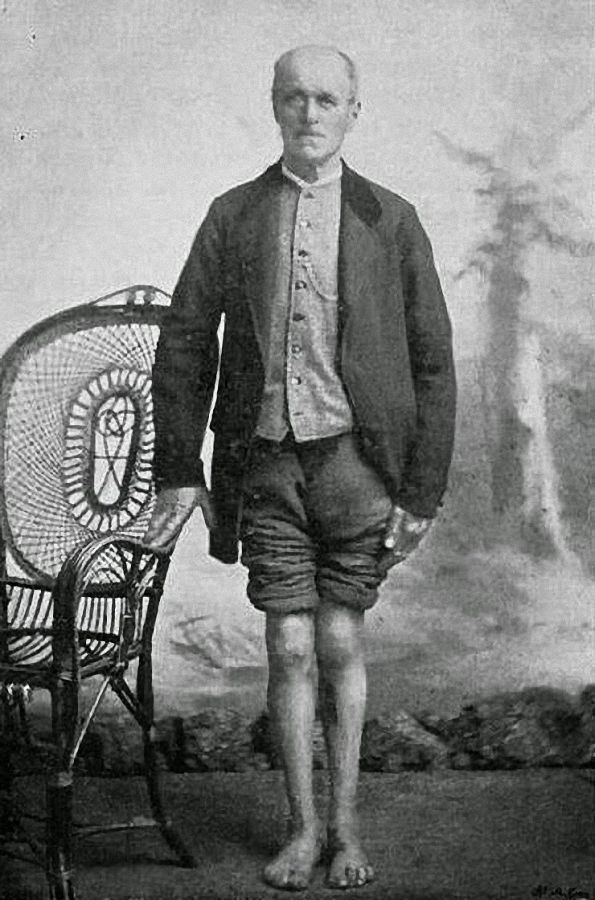
Pieter De Rudder 1893

Pieter De Rudder (July 2, 1822 in Jabbeke – March 22, 1898), in many French books Pierre De Rudder, in English Peter De Rudder, was a man whose recovery from a broken leg is one of the most famous recognized Lourdes miracles (a bronze cast of his bones is exhibited in the Lourdes Medical Bureau), although it is not supposed to have occurred in Lourdes itself, but in a sanctuary of Our Lady of Lourdes at Oostakker near Ghent (Belgium, East Flanders).

== The file ==
De Rudder was working for the Viscount Albéric du Bus de Gisignies when on February 16, 1867, in Jabbeke (West Flanders), a falling tree broke the two bones (tibia and fibula) of his left leg.

Several doctors attempted, unsuccessfully, to treat him, and one advised amputation, which was refused by De Rudder—or by the Viscount. The medical treatments were stopped at a time not precisely specified.

The Viscount paid De Rudder a pension that Father Rommelaere, vicar of Jabbeke, described as a "handsome salary", but on the viscount's death, on July 26, 1874 the pension was withdrawn by his successor.

On April 7, 1875, eight months and a half after the withdrawal of the pension, De Rudder went to implore Our Lady of Lourdes at Oostakker and, in the sanctuary itself, proclaimed himself cured. He displayed a scar which even just after the healing looked old.

Doctors, however, refused to issue an attestation to the priests of the parish, so in 1875 the only eyewitnesses were two neighbors and friends of De Rudder, father and son. These two witnesses signed the same statement, written by the vicar of Jabbeke, according to which the day before the pilgrimage they saw the ends of bone protruding into the wound. The certificate mentioned, in the third person, a female inhabitant of the village, not a signatory, who would have seen the same thing two days before the pilgrimage.

The Bishop of Bruges, Mgr Faict, requested information from Dr Van Hoestenberghe, a doctor who had never been the attending physician of De Rudder, but had examined the leg to satisfy his own curiosity. Dr. Van Hoestenberghe replied in April and May 1875. His two letters, lost by the diocese before the canonical investigation which led to the recognition of the miracle by Mgr Waffelaert in 1908, were only found again in 1956. Mgr Faict does not conduct a canonical investigation.

The last survivor among the attending physicians whose names are known, Dr Verriest, died in Bruges August 3, 1891. About a year later, during the annual Belgian pilgrimage to Lourdes in August 1892, Dr Van Hoestenberghe appears publicly for the first time. He writes to Dr Boissarie, head of the Bureau des constatations médicales de Lourdes (Lourdes Bureau of Medical Findings), two letters in which he reports the case De Rudder, saying that he had examined the leg when it was still ill and that he only can claim miracle. These letters caused a series of inquiries from various Catholic authorities. Eyewitnesses, who, as we saw, seem to have been only two in 1875, multiplied over time, as well as the examinations that Dr. Van Hoestenberghe said he made of the ill leg. In 1907, before the Episcopal Commission, whose report will lead to recognition of the miracle, he says he examined the injured leg ten or twelve times, the last time three or four months before the pilgrimage.

The date of the last examination of the leg is important because, in the opinion of many Catholic physicians, the only reason to consider the healing of De Rudder as miraculous is the testimonial proof of its instantaneousness.

Dr. Van Hoestenberghe's responses of April and May 1875 to Mgr Faict, which were lost during the canonical inquiry, are found again in 1956 and published in 1957. In the second of these responses, Dr. Van Hoestenberghe (who, as we saw, would report to the Commission of 1907–08 that he had examined the injured leg ten or twelve times, the last time three or four months before the pilgrimage) says he saw the leg only once, more than three years before the pilgrimage.

Canon De Meester, who was promoter of the cause in the inquiry of 1907-1908 continues, despite the letters of 1875, to believe that Dr Van Hoestenberghe made several examinations of the diseased leg and that the last examination took place about four months before De Rudder's pilgrimage. He puts forward notes confirming this view, that Dr Van Hoestenberghe said he took shortly after the pilgrimage. Dr Van Hoestenberghe mentioned these notes for the first time in 1899, in order to answer two Jesuits who had remarked to him that he had placed the care given by late Dr Verriest in 1875, which, compared to other sources, seems too late. The notes triumph over this objection: "Verriest 75". These notes have the peculiarity to contradict the letters from 1875 to Mgr Faict not only on the number and date of examinations that Dr. Van Hoestenberghe made of the ill leg, but also on the date of the examination he made of the leg after the pilgrimage: April 9, 1875 according to the notes, while Dr Van Hoestenberghe wrote on April 15, 1875 to Mgr Faict that he had not yet had time to examine the healed leg. These notes, which were at an exceptional place in the notebook of Dr. Van Hoestenberghe: the inside cover, not their chronological place among the pages, can only be consulted on a picture, because they seem to have disappeared at the bishop's palace, with the rest of the notebook.

== Skeptical investigation ==
Noted skeptic Joe Nickell who investigated, discovered that some of the testimony in the case was subject to error as it was unrecorded for eighteen years. He claims, that the healing had occurred before Rudder's visit to the shrine and it was not instantaneous. Nickell concluded that in the De Rudder case "there is evidence that an injury, healed long before, was passed off as instantaneous—a miracle that wasn’t."

== See also ==
- Oostakker Basilica
