= Oostakker Basilica =

Roman Catholic church at Oostakker near Ghent in Belgium

Coordinates: 51°4′57″N 3°45′47″E

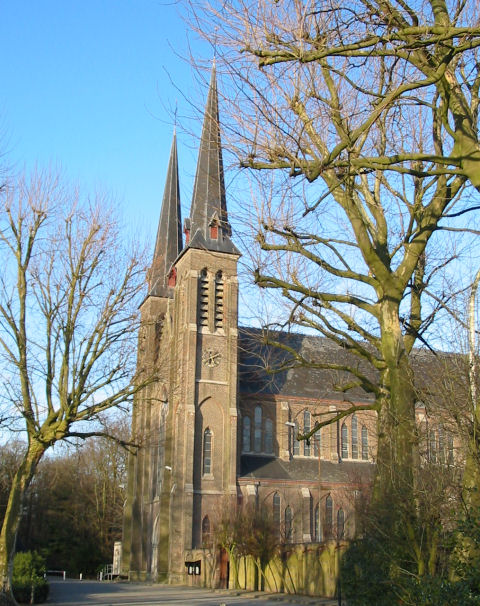
Basilica Exterior

The Basilica of Our Lady of Lourdes is a Roman Catholic church at Oostakker, near Ghent in Belgium. Built in neogothic style at the end of the XIXe century it is the most important centre of Marian pilgrimage in Flanders.

In 1873 the Marquise of Courtebourne-de Nédonchel had a Lourdes grotto built in the gardens of her château at Slotendries. People from Ghent and other nearby locations asked to be allowed to visit the grotto and pray there, and it was claimed that in 1875 Pieter De Rudder was miraculously healed of a compound fracture.

To accommodate the resulting increase in the number of pilgrims, a neo-Gothic church based on plans by E. Van Hoecke-Peeters (slightly modified by J. B. Bethune) was completed in 1876 and consecrated in 1877. It was entrusted to the Jesuits, to which the Marquis's late son had belonged.

In one of the towers there is a carillon made up of 49 bells, cast by the Michiels Foundries in the 1950s. The keyboard was temporarily removed during renovation works in the 1970s but has not yet been replaced to this date.

== See also ==
- List of Catholic churches in Belgium
