= Followers of Christ =

Christian denomination in the United States

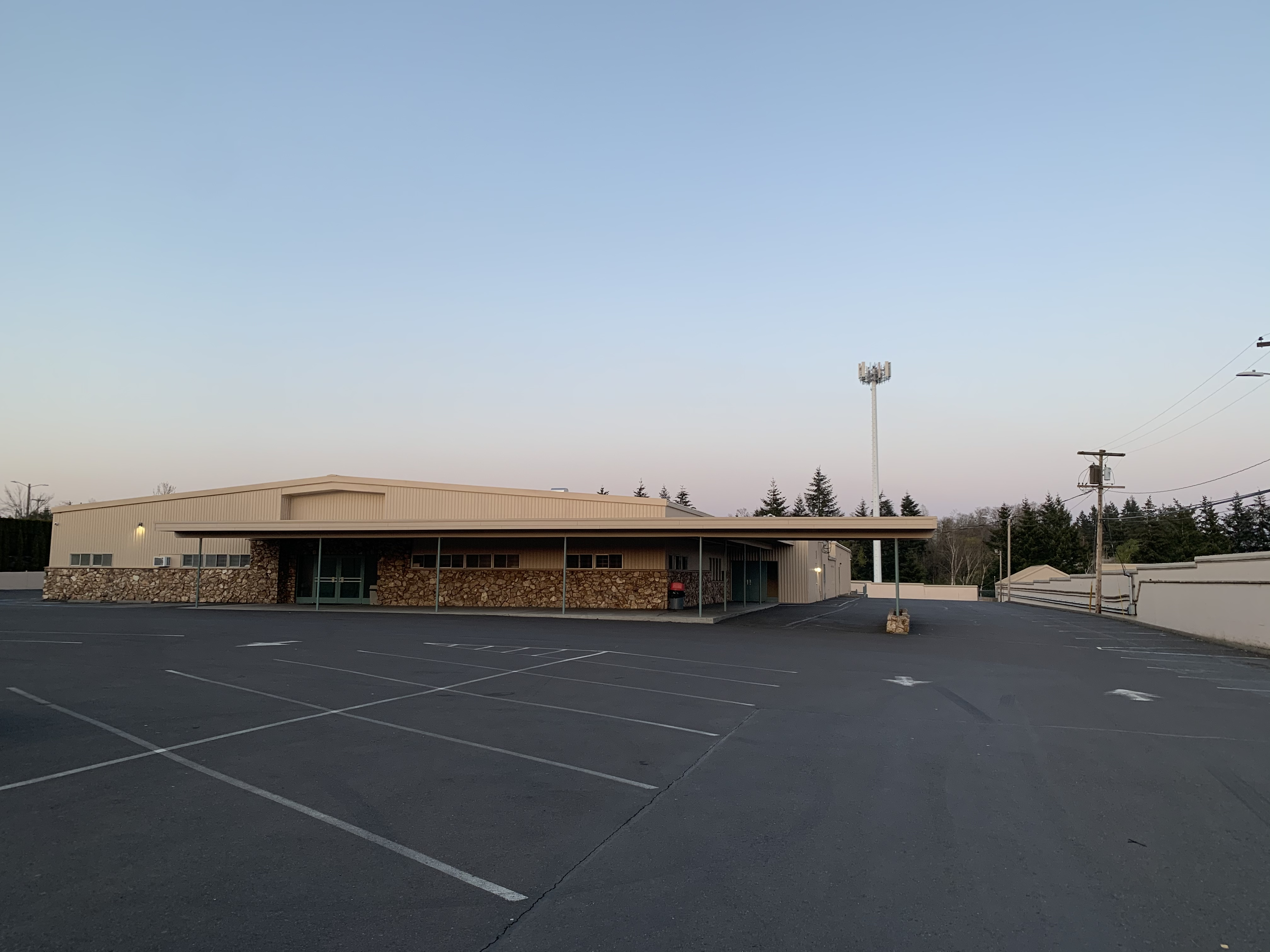
Followers of Christ Church in Oregon City, Oregon

The Followers of Christ is a small Christian denomination based in the U.S. states of Oklahoma, Oregon, Idaho, formerly California, and was founded in Kansas.

== History ==
The Followers of Christ church was founded in Chanute, Kansas, by General Marion Reece (1844-1914; sometimes spelled Riess), rooted in the Holiness Pentecostal traditions. The church moved to Ringwood, Oklahoma, in the 1890s, where leadership passed to Elder John Marshall Morris, who was the father of Marion Morris. The Ringwood church would split in 1940 after ministers George Oakley and George Long didn’t agree about fornication and alcoholism, along with a controversy about the Long family. Marion Morris led the Ringwood, Oklahoma, branch of the church until his death in 1988, and was followed by Jack Watkins, Jim Wallace, Gary Wallace, and Ted Nakvinda.

During the 1920s, Charlie Smith (the founder's brother-in-law) and George White began missions in Red Bluff, California, and Chico, California. George White's nephews Walter White and LaVerne “Vern” Baldwin became ministers in the church. Walter split his congregation in Oregon City, Oregon from Idaho in the 1940s, after a dispute with Baldwin, possibly about adultery, women cutting their hair, and fornication. Baldwin later became the main minister of the Boise branch, and would be followed by his son, Don, and mutual cousin Delbert Cunningham. White and his congregation built a house of worship on Molalla Avenue in Oregon City, then a largely rural timber and farming community, now a suburb of Portland. He was a fiery speaker and maintained tight control over his congregation, and would often shout “I am Jesus of Nazareth! Be faithful, be faithful!” from the pulpit. When he was alive, White allowed new members into his congregation, and former members said White was treated like a Messiah of sorts, as he claimed to have been called by God to preach at the age of 22. White died in 1969, and the church has functioned without a minister since that time. The last two elders associated with White, Riley Keith and Glenford Lee, had died in the 1980s, and the now-leaderless Oregon community became more isolated and inward-focused, and ceased recruitment of new members. Church services consist of singing seven to ten hymns every Thursday night and Sunday morning, with one of the five elected board members announcing who needs prayers at the beginning of every meeting, without any spiritual teaching or Bible readings.

Estimates of the Oregon church's membership in 2008 ranged from 1,200 to 1,500. The Followers of Christ also have congregations in Ringwood, Oklahoma, Enid, Oklahoma, Edmonton, Alberta, Meridian, Idaho, Middleton, Idaho, Boise, Idaho, Cambridge, Idaho, the original Idaho church in Picabo, Idaho, a church in Caldwell, Idaho sometimes called the Lake Lowell church, and Marsing, Idaho. The Marsing church is welcoming to new members and is different from the Oregon City church, as they don’t shun those who leave. The Caldwell church is similar to the Oregon City church, lacking a preacher. Most members in all of the churches believe the Oregon City congregation lost their ways. and local communities operate independently of Followers of Christ churches in other areas.

The Oregon City congregation owns a church building, as well as use a cemetery in Carus, where deceased church members are predominantly buried.

== Alleged doctrine ==
The Followers of Christ is Pentecostal in orientation, and believes in a literal interpretation of Scripture, including in the power of faith healing, prayer and the laying on of hands by church elders. Unlike many other churches which include faith healing as part of their doctrine but do not necessarily prohibit modern medical care, such as Christian Science, many members of the Followers of Christ refuse all forms of medicine and professional medical care. The church, most specifically the Oregon City, Picabo and Lake Lowell branches, are said to practice shunning of those who violate or challenge church doctrine, including those who seek medical treatment. It has been alleged that many Followers clandestinely see doctors in defiance of church teaching, though it seems there are many members who openly seek medical treatment in conjunction with prayer and fasting, under the interpretation that a salvation through Grace and medical treatment are of no conflict.

The church relies on the Authorized Version of the Bible, and practices adult baptism by immersion, fasting and footwashing.

The church is also known for legalism and a male-dominated society. The members of the church frequently greet each other with kisses on the lips; members of the church are often pejoratively referred to as "kissers" by others in Oregon City, and in other communities where large concentrations of Followers of Christ are found. According to church members in the Oregon City branch, children raised in the church attend public schools, but do not socialize outside the church once reaching middle-school age.

== Controversy ==
=== Before 1999 ===
During the latter part of the twentieth century, the church began to attract attention from authorities in the state of Oregon due to an unusually high mortality rate among its children. Larry Lewman, a former medical examiner in the state, alleges that during a ten-year period twenty-five children perished due to the lack of medical intervention—a death rate 26 times higher than among the general population. An investigation by The Oregonian claimed that at least 21 out of 78 minors found to be buried in the church cemetery died of preventable causes, including simple infections which would be easily treated with routine antibiotics. Of the 78 children examined, 38 had died within the first year following birth. High death rates among children have also been noticed among Followers of Christ members in Idaho and Oklahoma. The high death rate among church children attracted national media attention, including coverage of the church by Time magazine, ABC News newsmagazine 20/20, and the PBS program Religion & Ethics Newsweekly.

Prior to 1999, authorities in Oregon were largely powerless to combat these deaths. Like many states, Oregon has laws protecting parents who practice faith healing from prosecution. The laws in Oregon at the time were especially liberal in the protections granted to parents, granting immunity from manslaughter charges to parents whose children perished due to an alleged reliance on faith healing over traditional medicine. The widespread immunity granted by the state was opposed by many in the medical community, including the American Academy of Pediatrics and the American Medical Association. The opposition was also supported by several former church members, including parents whose children had died from causes believed to be preventable; these parents have reported being ostracized from the church as a result of their advocacy.

On the other side of the debate were other faith-healing churches and civil liberties groups, who argued that parents' freedom of religion was paramount, and outweighed the state's interest in protecting children from harm. Christian Science, a religion which also practices spiritual-healing, pushed law-makers to enact religious exemptions to homicide and child neglect laws. In addition, many wished to ensure that the law differentiated between parents who acted in good faith, and parents who were genuinely abusive to their children. The debate in Oregon mirrored other debates concerning faith healing which have occurred throughout the United States, many of which have eliminated religious immunity laws for homicide.

==== Oregon religious exemption laws ====
In January 1999, a bill was introduced in the Oregon Legislature to repeal the "religious beliefs" defense to charges of manslaughter, homicide, and child abuse. After much debate, a modified version of the law was subsequently passed later that year.

An Alberta, Canada couple who were members of a different church were successfully prosecuted by authorities when their child died under similar circumstances; the law there did not provide the same faith-healing exemptions that were found in Oregon.

In March 2008, controversy was renewed when a 15-month-old church toddler, Ava Worthington, died of pneumonia; the first known death to occur under circumstances potentially covered by the 1999 law. Authorities in Clackamas County, Oregon filed charges of manslaughter against the parents in the case. Just three months later, on June 18, 2008, Ava's 16-year-old uncle, Neil Beagley died from an easily treatable condition (a long-term bladder blockage that forced urea into the bloodstream). In neither case did the families seek medical help. On July 23, 2009, the parents of Ava Worthington were acquitted of manslaughter charges in the death of their daughter, but the father was found guilty of one lesser charge which carries a potential sentence of a year in jail. On February 2, 2010, by a 10–2 jury verdict in Clackamas County, the parents of Neil Beagley were found guilty of criminally negligent homicide, with sentencing scheduled for February 18, 2010. Both were sentenced to 16 months in prison on March 8, 2010. On June 19, 2013, the Oregon Court of Appeals affirmed the Beagleys' convictions, rejecting their claims that their religious beliefs required the state to prove that they knew their son would die, and not merely that they should have known of a substantial and unjustifiable risk that their son would die (the standard for criminal negligence).

=== 2011–present ===
In January 2011, HB2721 was introduced into the Oregon Legislature which would remove religious belief as an affirmative defense for homicide. It passed March 3, 2011. The measure was later signed into law June 9, 2011.

In June 2011, Timothy and Rebecca Wyland were convicted of first-degree criminal mistreatment and sentenced to 90 days in jail for using faith healing instead of seeking medical care for their infant daughter. During early infancy, their daughter developed a hemangioma that became so large that it engulfed her left eye, leaving her on the verge of blindness. She has since improved under court-ordered care.

On September 29, 2011, a Clackamas County jury unanimously found church members Dale and Shannon Hickman guilty of second-degree manslaughter in connection with the September 26, 2009, death of their infant son David, less than nine hours after his birth. Mrs. Hickman went into labor two months before her due date, and the couple decided she would give birth in her mother's home, instead of a hospital. When the three pound, seven ounce, infant developed severe health problems shortly after his birth, instead of seeking emergency medical care, Mr. Hickman, according to The Oregonian, "Responded by holding his newborn son, praying for him and anointing him with olive oil." At trial, prosecutors argued that the couple had ample time after the premature birth to get medical assistance. An expert witness testified that had they done so, the infant would have had a 99 percent chance of survival. In response to a question at the trial, Mr. Hickman said he did not call 911, "Because he was praying." Mrs. Hickman testified that she did not call for help because her church required her to defer to her husband. Oregon mandatory sentencing laws call for a minimum prison sentence of six years and three months for this conviction, although, because the Hickmans were indicted before HB 2721 (discussed above) was enacted, their potential sentence could be capped at 18 months imprisonment and a $250,000 fine. Both Hickmans are 26 years old (in 2011). They have two other children.

In November, 2013, KATU-TV reopened its coverage of the group after a reporter was tipped off to the recurrence of key family names in area cemeteries, ten of which represented burials within the last two years.

In September 2025, church members Taylor and Blair Edwards were sentenced to 30 days in jail after pleading guilty to first-degree criminal mistreatment, following the June 26, 2023 death of their two-day-old son Hayden. No attempts were made to get medical care, although the child received prayer and oil anointments. A post mortem report referenced jaundice caused by excess bilirubin in the child's blood. The couple agreed to health monitoring of their three other children.

== See also ==
- General Assembly and Church of the First Born
