= General Assembly and Church of the First Born =

Small faith-healing religious group

The General Assembly and Church of the First Born (often shortened to "Church of the First Born") is a fundamental faith healing sect. This group is an offshoot of the Church of Christ (Latter Day Saints), being that many of its founding members had previously claimed to be members of the Church of Jesus Christ. In an interview of Elias Brewer, posted in the Ripley Times, in Payne County, Oklahoma, dated March 1901, he laid out the original organization of the church, admitting members who believed in the Book of Mormon. Although The Church of the Firstborn's roots are in the RLDS church, this group claims no current affiliation with the various Mormon fundamentalist groups with similar "Firstborn" names nor do they acknowledge the Book Of Mormon as doctrine. The church subscribes to the King James Only movement and holds a Nuda scriptura view of Scripture.

Pamphlet from the 1960s

This non-denominational group has an informal structure and membership. Assemblies are organized with elders, deacons, and baptized members. There are no official written member registries that are kept. Their style of worship is unprogrammed, meaning that a church meeting is not planned beforehand. Baptized members of the church move as the Holy Spirit leads them to preach, pray, prophesy, testify, sing, or speak in tongues. This is done in a somber and orderly manner, in contrast to other Spirit-filled denominations, such as Holiness groups. There are no instruments aside from a piano, which is only used in a few assemblies across the United States. Formal Bible Studies and Sunday School is not observed, and the member's children sit among the adult congregation during meeting.

The General Assembly and Church of the Firstborn is normally a very tight-knit community, taking care of their sick and needy when necessary. They are generally small in number compared to other denominations.

== Other names ==
Older newspapers refer to them as "Faith preachers," "Christian Faith," "True Followers," or "Burtonites," but they referred to themselves as the "Followers of Christ."

== History ==
All of the baptisms originated and trace to John N. Burton, Elias Brewer, and David T. McDonald.

John N. Burton was a Latter-Day Saint, being described as a "seventies", meaning a preacher/travelling minister/missionary, in the Latter-Day Saint "Zion's Reveille" journal dated November 1846. Burton was removed as a member of the Latter-Day Saints Church due to apostasy. John Burton petitioned to be a member of the Union Grove Branch of the RLDS church in 1860, but he was denied by a board due to "impure motives." This is presumably when he began his work with what would eventually become The General Assembly and Church of the Firstborn.

Elias Brewer

Elias Brewer was one of the first baptized by John N. Burton on September 1, 1869, with David T. McDonald being baptized a year later. This was a special relationship, as McDonald's daughter, Lucinda Catherine, married Elias on November 18, 1866, cited in the personal interview with Elias in the Ripley Times.

David McDonald

McDonald was baptized by John N. Burton, and ordained to preach the gospel in Otoe County, Nebraska, about 1870. He claimed the divine gifts of healing, being reported as having even raised the dead. He left Nebraska for Texas in the spring of 1873, but by the end of the year was living and preaching around Chanute, Kansas. In the latter days of his life, McDonald relocated his family, to Linn County, Kansas where he died in February 1892.

As recorded in a local newspaper, a great revival happened about 1876 near Arkansas City, Kansas. By September 1876, a church known simply as "The Followers of Christ" was organized. Arkansas City, KS later became the "port of entry" for those readying themselves for the Oklahoma land rush. By 1880, several hundred church members existed in the state of Kansas, though they always met in homes or school houses.

Marion Reece & children

General Marion Reece of Chanute, KS (1844–1917), a veteran of the Civil War, was baptized by David T. McDoanld, and also immediately called to preach. He continued establishing churches after McDonald's death throughout the state of Oklahoma. It was claimed there were about 1400 brethren in Oklahoma at this time, but since there are no official records, it is not indisputable. Charlie Smith, Reece's brother-in-law, migrated with many to Idaho where they, although now split into several different sects, still hold to the name Followers of Christ. Charlie Smith was baptized by Reece. This is the history of the connections between the Church of the Firstborn and the Followers of Christ in Idaho, Oregon City, OR, and previous small communities in California.

Other early preachers of the faith include Nathan Parisho (1847–1919) and his brother Tommy (1854–1937). Bro. Tommy Parisho was mentioned in the Ripley Times article dated March 22, 1901, which detailed his activities in a church meeting. The newspaper records the spelling of his name as "Parashaw" They established many bodies of brethren, including the churches at Indianapolis in 1896). Jim Hays (1854–1916), another minister of note, is said to have baptized over 1,000 followers in his life from Kansas to Washington and back into Canada. He evangelized and established churches in the Rocky and Fay, Oklahoma communities about 1902.

== Military exemption ==
The elders of the Homestead church, Alonzo McCoy (1871–1955), John F. Keltch (1852–1929), and Tom Smith (1855–1921), with other churches such as the one in Indianapolis, sent to Washington D.C. a request, dated 14 September 1918, for national recognition as a church for the purposes of claiming religious exemptions for military service. The document titled "Articles of Faith of the Church of the Firstborn known as the Followers of Christ" incorporates both names by which the group was known. By the next world war, the name "General Assembly and Church of the Firstborn" was recognized by all except the Idaho/Oregon assemblies, a small California community, and the Enid, Oklahoma group. All still retain the same standards of belief and share blood ties.

The articles of faith are a minor adaptation of the original articles of faith penned by Joseph Smith:

Articles of Faith published by the Agra Church (1959)

First – We believe in God the Eternal Father and in His Son Jesus Christ and in the Holy Ghost.

Second – We believe through the atonement of Christ all mankind may be saved by obedience to the law and ordinances of the Gospel.

Third -- We believe that the first principles and ordinances of the gospel are: First, faith in the Lord Jesus Christ; second, repentance; third, baptism by immersion for the remission of sins; fourth, laying on his hands for the gift of the Holy Ghost.

Fourth -- We believe that a man must be called of God by prophecy or revelation to preach the gospel and administer the ordinances thereof.

Fifth -- We believe in the same organization that existed in the primitive church, namely, Apostles, Prophets, Pastors, Teachers, and Evangelists.

Sixth -- We believe in the gift of Tongues, Prophecy, Revelation, Visions, Healing, Interpretation of Tongues, and,

Seventh -- We believe the Bible to be the word of God and we must live by every word of it as recorded in the New Testament, judgment to the line, and righteousness to the plummet.

Eighth -- We claim the privilege of worshiping Almighty God according to the dictates of our conscience, and allow all men the same privilege; let them worship how, when, or what they may.

Ninth -- We believe in being subject to Kings, Presidents, Rulers, and Magistrates in obeying, honoring, and sustaining the law as far as it harmonizes with the Divine Law. But do not believe in participating in war from any standpoint, for Jesus says: “Thou shalt not kill,” and he also said: “All they that take the sword shall perish with the sword.”

Tenth -- We believe in being honest, true, chaste, benevolent, virtuous, and in doing good to all men. Indeed, we may say we follow the admission of Paul. We believe all things. We hope all things, we have endured many things, and hope to be able to endure all things to the glory of God.

Therefore, we believe according to our articles of faith. We should have the right to lead a quiet and peaceful life and worship God, according to the dictates of our conscience, none molesting, or making afraid, as the constitution allows. We therefore petition honorable Woodrow Wilson, president of the United States, and Commander-in-Chief of the Army and Navy, to grant our brethren exemption from military duties or participation in war, and allow them to work on farms, factories, etc., as our great Government may deem best

Alonzo Lavoy McCoy

John Keltch

Tom Smith

Elders at Homestead, Oklahoma

Put on record at Washington D.C.

September 14, 1918

== Controversies ==
The church promotes faith healing, believing that illnesses and injuries should be treated with prayer rather than medical care. In 2012, two church members pleaded guilty to negligent homicide charges following the faith healing death of their 16-year-old son. The child died at home after receiving no medical care for a burst appendix.
