= Lourdes effect =

Skeptical theory regarding the ambiguity of miracles

The term Lourdes effect has been coined by the Belgian philosopher and skeptic Etienne Vermeersch for the tendency of supposed supernatural powers to resist clear demonstration. Vermeersch contends that if Lourdes's healing powers were real, the Virgin Mary or God would reattach severed arms as often as they cure ambiguous paralysis or blindness, and the absence of such undeniable healings constitutes strong evidence against the subtle ones as well. The same applies to other mysterious and occult phenomena such as the sightings and photos of the Loch Ness Monster and the Yeti.

Vermeersch uses this term to mock what he calls the selective and uncritical approach to miracles, or the frivolous attribution of supernatural gifts to human beings. Skeptics observe that over 100 pilgrims have died in plane, train, and bus accidents while traveling to and from Lourdes, a figure far exceeding the approximately 70 claimed faith healing miracles recognized by the Vatican.
