= Oostakker =

Sub-municipality of the city of Ghent, Belgium

- Sub-municipality of Ghent
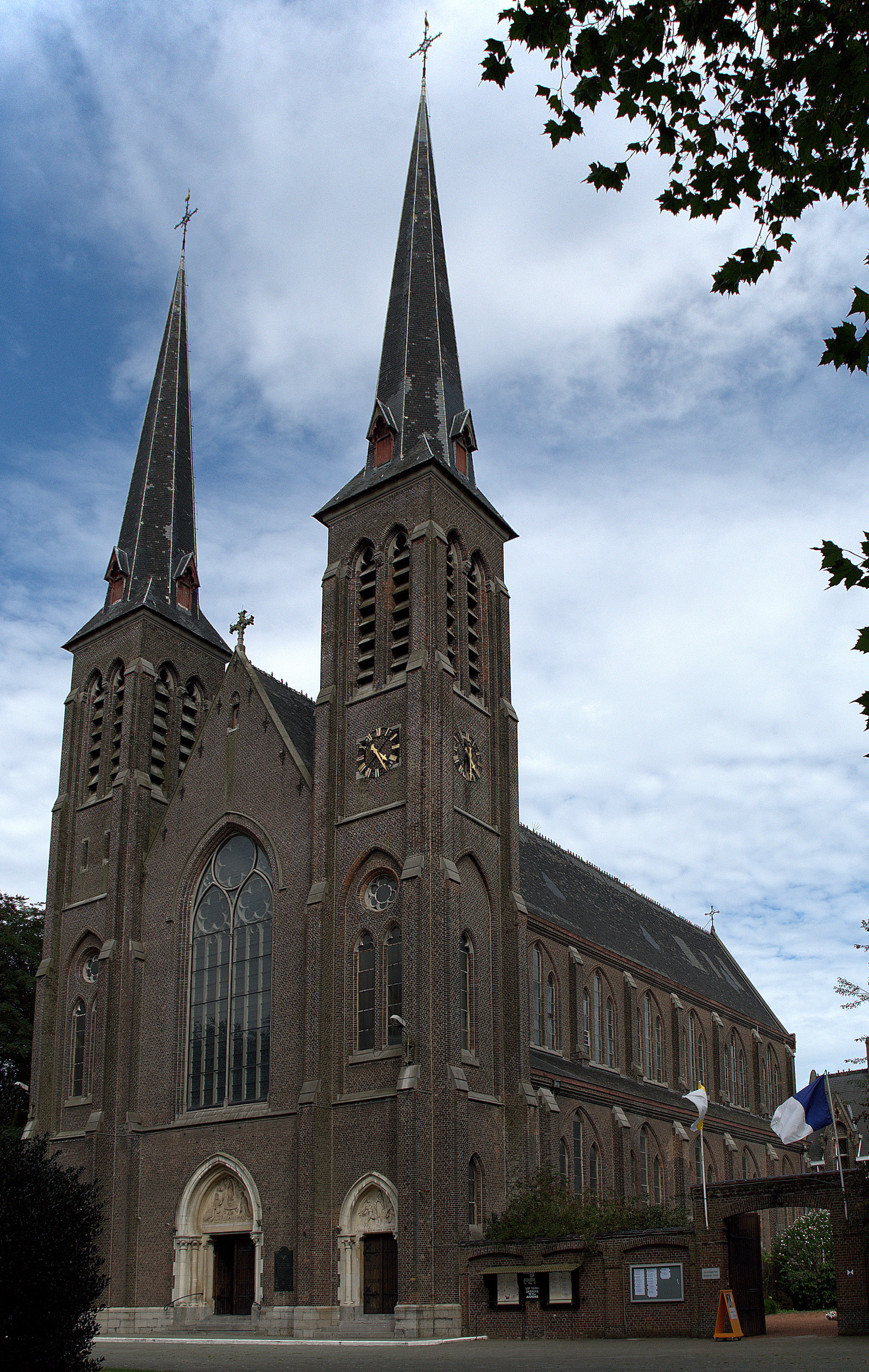
- Oostakker Basilica
- Interactive map of Oostakker
- Location within Belgium Location within East Flanders
- Coordinates: 51°06′01″N 3°45′48″E
- Country: Belgium
- Community: Flemish Community
- Region: Flemish Region
- Province: East Flanders
- Arrondissement: Ghent
- Municipality: Ghent

Area
  - Total: 10.47 km^{2} (4.04 sq mi)

Population (2020-01-01)
  - Total: 14,074
  - Density: 1,344/km^{2} (3,482/sq mi)
- Postal codes: 9041
- Area codes: 09

Oostakker (Dutch pronunciation: [ˈoːstˌɑkər]; formerly spelled Oostacker) is a sub-municipality of the city of Ghent located in the province of East Flanders, Flemish Region, Belgium. It was a separate municipality until 1977. In 1872, Sint-Amandsberg was detached from Oostakker. In 1900, 1920 and 1927, parts of the original municipality were already annexed to Ghent. On 1 January 1977, the municipality of Oostakker was merged into Ghent.

The hamlet is mainly known for the Shrine of Oostakker, a Roman Catholic shrine of the Virgin Mary. Residents of Oostakker are called Oostakkezen.

== Shrine of Oostakker ==
The miraculous shrine of the Blessed Virgin is a place of pilgrimage from Belgium, the Netherlands and Northern France. It is a comparatively recent, dating from 1873 dating from a statue in a grotto built by the local gentry family. It was first opened to the local peasants on Sundays, but comparatively quickly it became very popular with a large Gothic church starting to be built in 1877. The shrine was entrusted to the Jesuits.

== Gallery ==
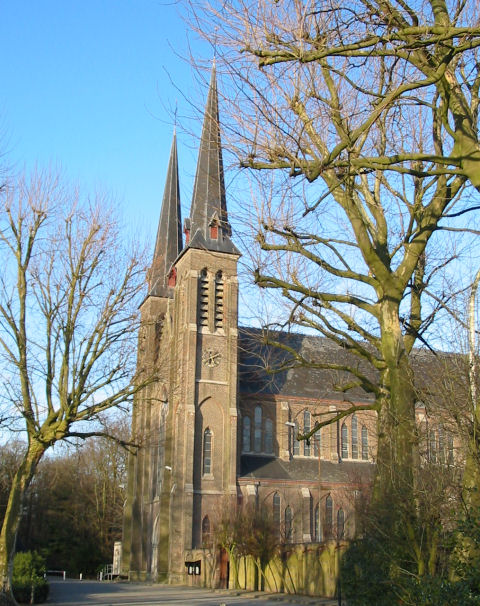
Oostakker Basilica.

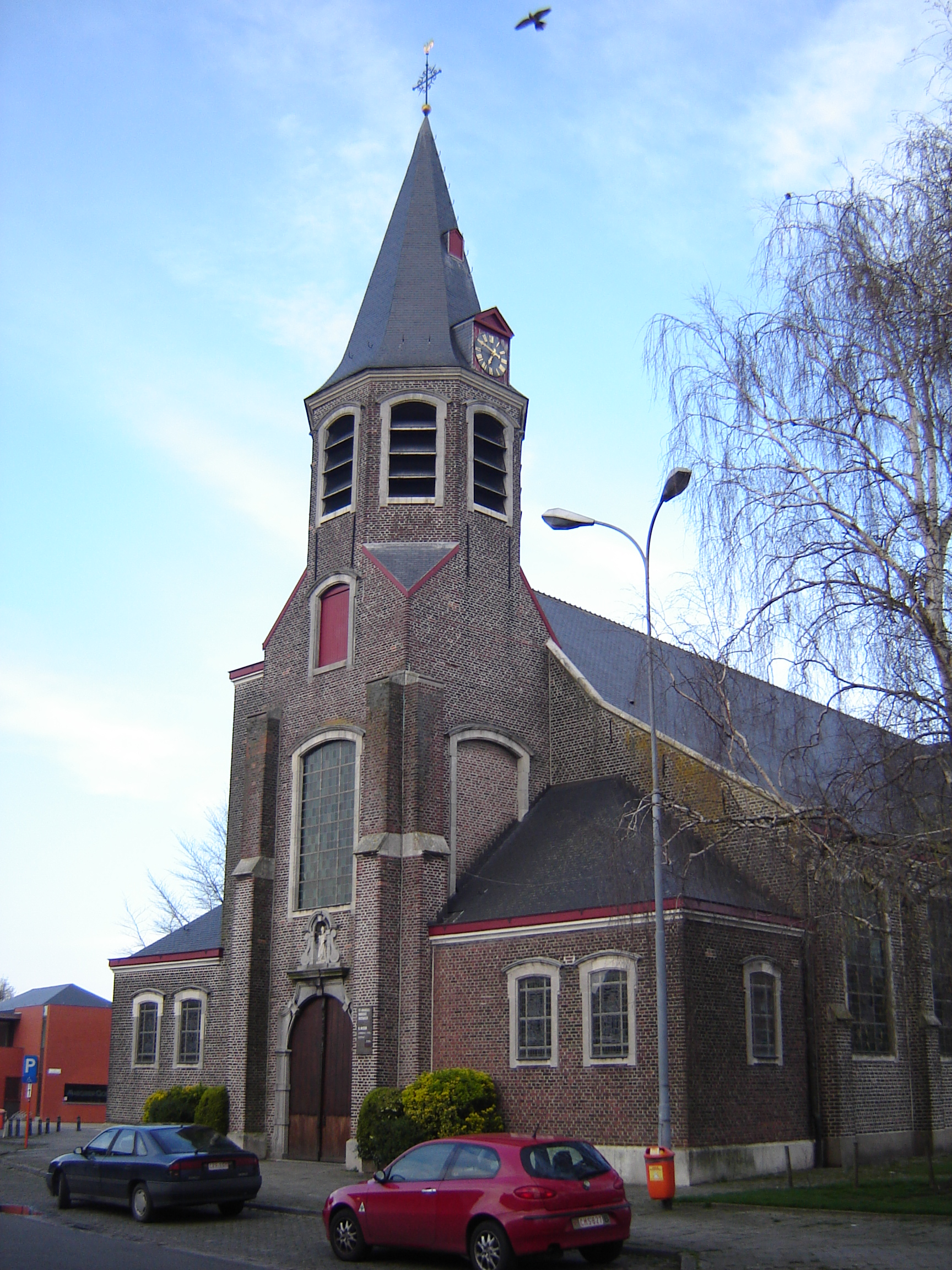
Church of Saint Amand.
