= Garchizy station =

Railway station in Garchizy, France

Garchizy
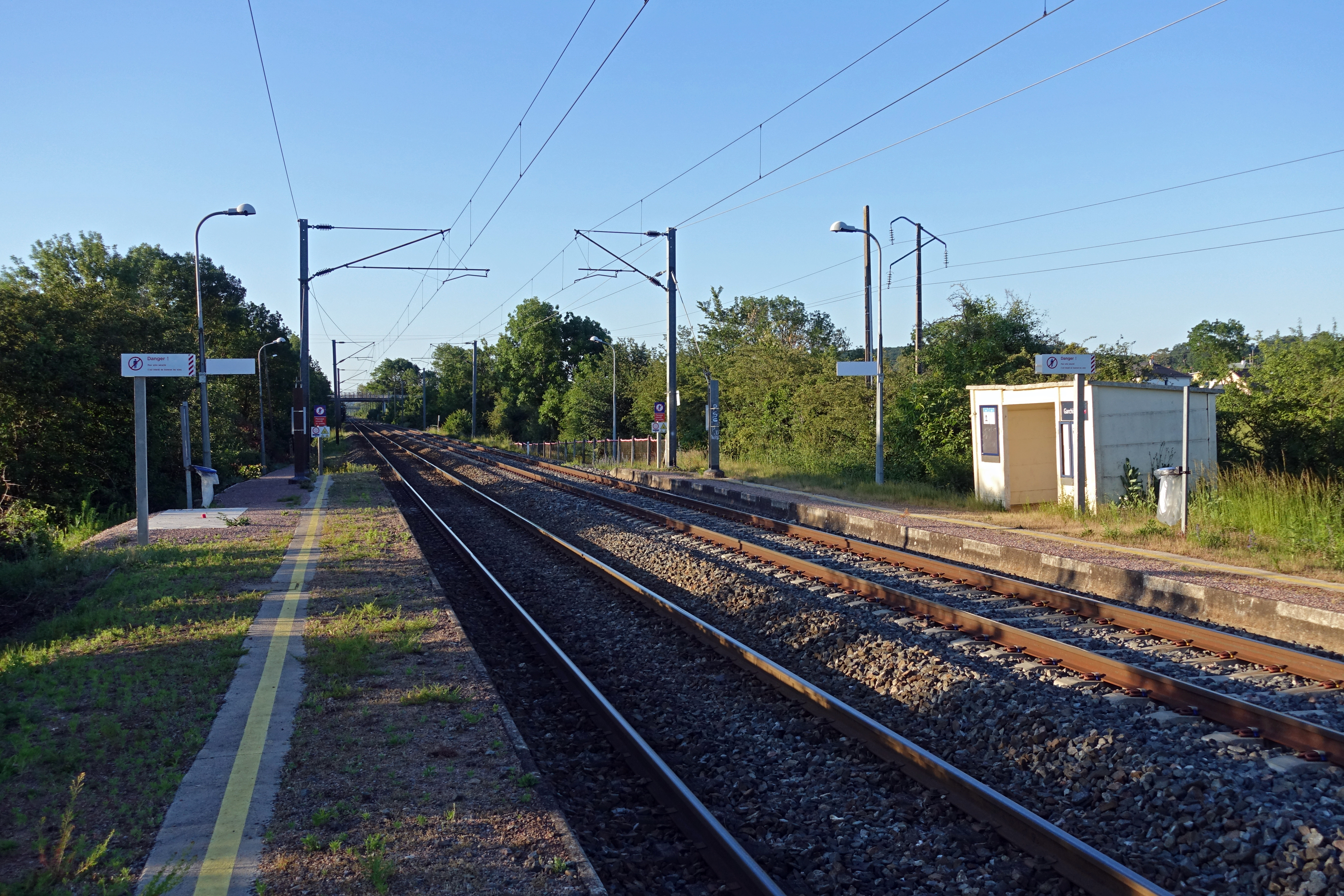
- Garchizy station, in Nievre department, France.

General information
- Location: Garchizy, Nièvre, Bourgogne-Franche-Comté; France
- Coordinates: 47°02′35″N 3°05′09″E
- Line: Moret-Lyon railway
- Platforms: 2
- Tracks: 2

Other information
- Station code: 87691436

Services
Preceding station	TER Bourgogne-Franche-Comté	Following station
Pougues-les-Eaux towards Cosne-sur-Loire	TER	Fourchambault towards Nevers-le-Banlay
Location

Garchizy is a railway station in Garchizy, Bourgogne-Franche-Comté, France. The station is located on the Moret-Lyon railway. The station is served by TER (local) services operated by SNCF.

== Train services ==
The station is served by regional trains towards Cosne-sur-Loire and Nevers.
