= Vauzelles station =

Railway station in Varennes-Vauzelles, France

Vauzelles
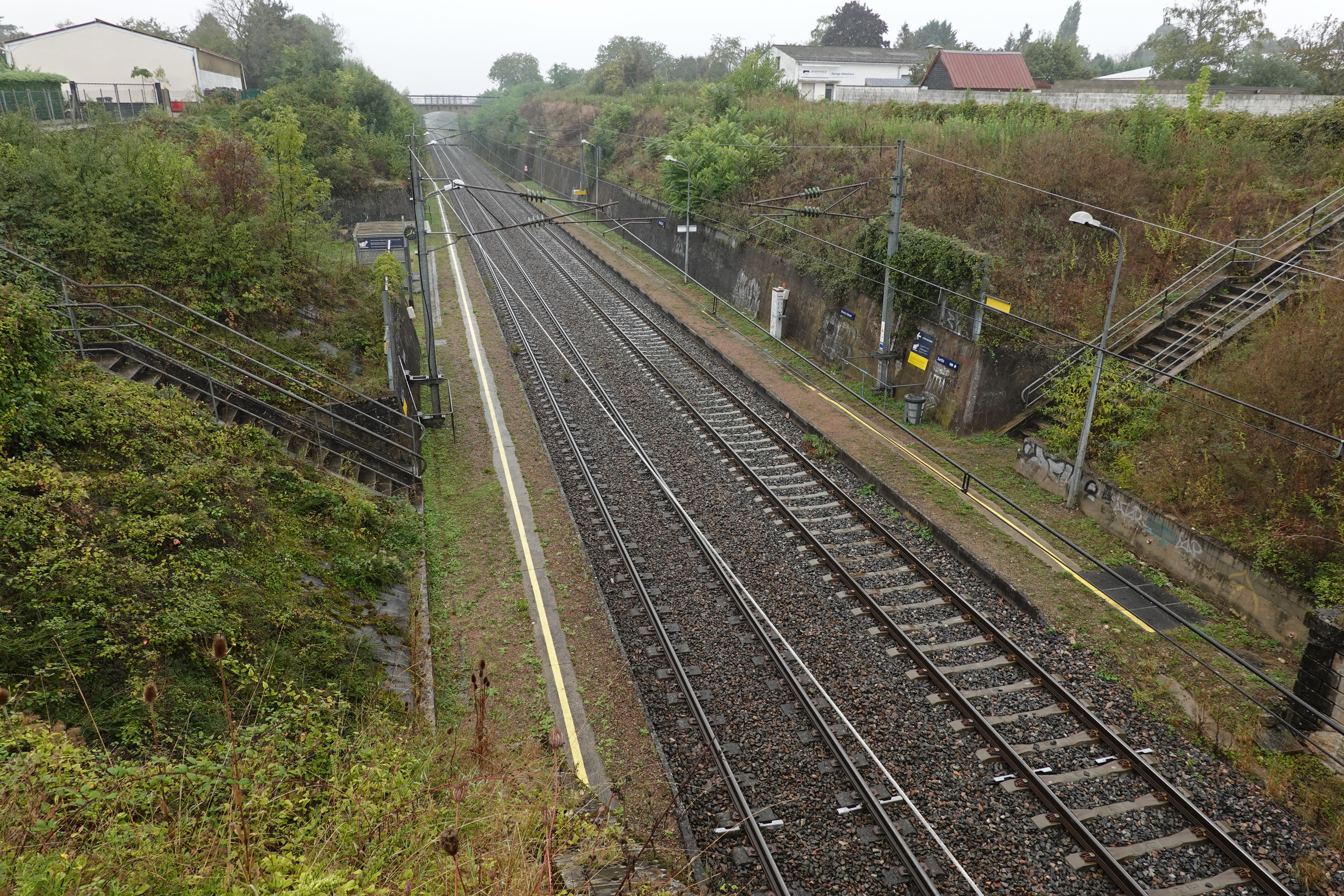

General information
- Location: Varennes-Vauzelles, Nièvre, Bourgogne-Franche-Comté; France
- Coordinates: 47°00′04″N 3°08′03″E
- Line: Moret-Lyon railway
- Platforms: 2
- Tracks: 2

Other information
- Station code: 87691469

Services
Preceding station	TER Bourgogne-Franche-Comté	Following station
Fourchambault towards Cosne-sur-Loire	TER	Nevers towards Nevers-le-Banlay
Location

Vauzelles is a railway station in Varennes-Vauzelles, Bourgogne-Franche-Comté, France. The station is located on the Moret-Lyon railway. The station is served by regional trains (TER Bourgogne-Franche-Comté) towards Cosne-sur-Loire and Nevers.
