= Mesves–Bulcy station =

Railway station in Mesves-sur-Loire, France

Mesves–Bulcy
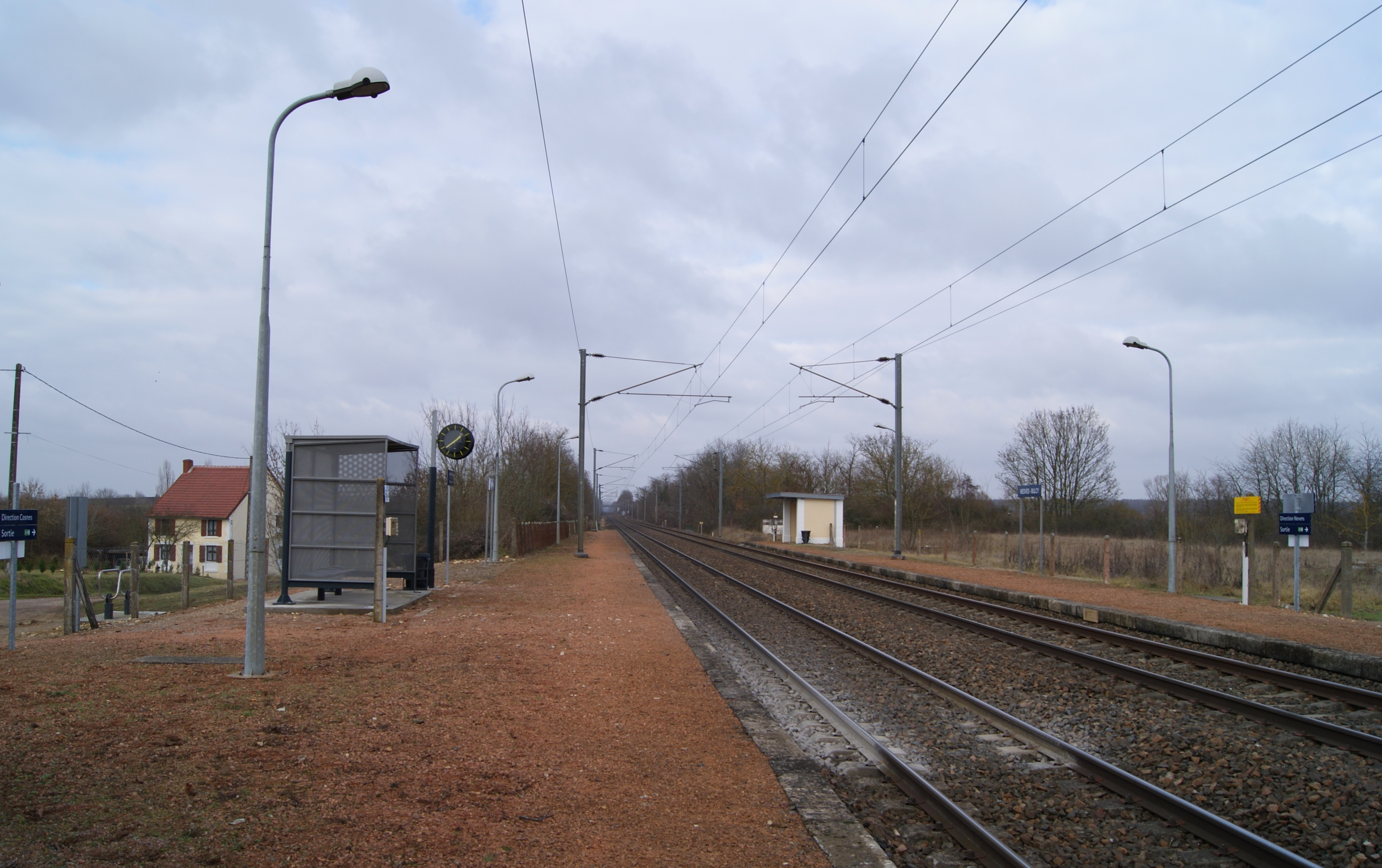
- Mesves–Bulcy station

General information
- Location: Mesves-sur-Loire, Nièvre, Bourgogne-Franche-Comté, France
- Coordinates: 47°14′32″N 3°00′23″E
- Line: Moret-Lyon railway
- Platforms: 2
- Tracks: 2

Other information
- Station code: 87696187

Services
| Preceding station | TER Bourgogne-Franche-Comté | Following station |
|---|---|---|
| Pouilly-sur-Loire towards Cosne-sur-Loire | TER | La Charité towards Nevers-le-Banlay |
Location

Mesves–Bulcy is a railway station in Mesves-sur-Loire, Bourgogne-Franche-Comté, France. The station is located on the Moret-Lyon railway. The station is served by TER (local) services operated by SNCF between Cosne-sur-Loire and Nevers.
