= La Charité station =

Railway station in La Charité-sur-Loire, France

La Charité
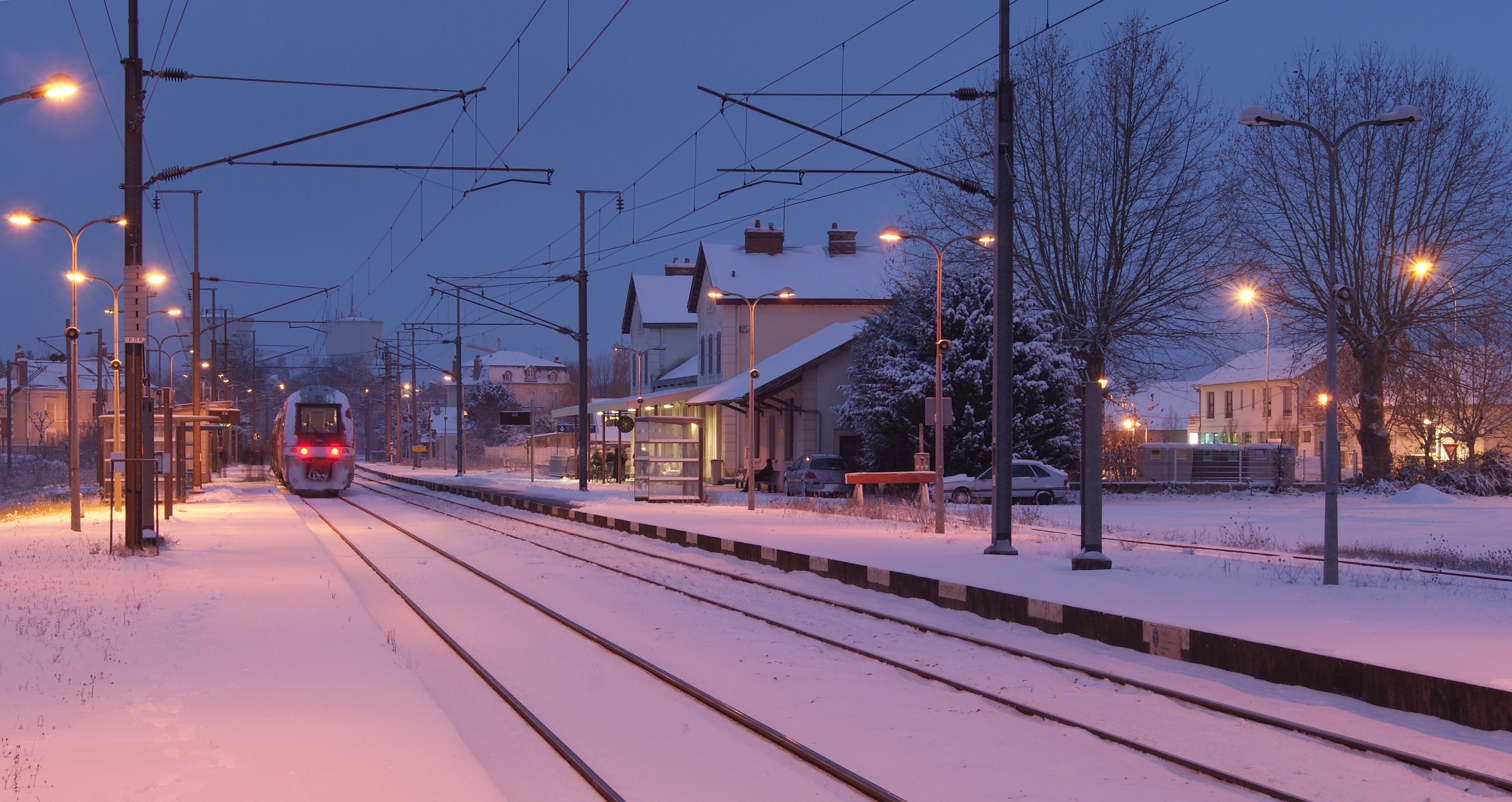
- La Charité station in the snow

General information
- Location: La Charité-sur-Loire, Nièvre, Bourgogne-Franche-Comté; France
- Coordinates: 47°10′47″N 3°01′26″E
- Line: Moret-Lyon railway
- Platforms: 2
- Tracks: 2

Other information
- Station code: 87696195

Services
Preceding station	SNCF	Following station
Tracy-Sancerre towards Paris-Bercy	Intercités	Pougues-les-Eaux towards Nevers
Preceding station	TER Bourgogne-Franche-Comté	Following station
Mesves-Bulcy towards Cosne-sur-Loire	TER	La Marche towards Nevers-le-Banlay
Location

La Charité is a railway station in La Charité-sur-Loire, Bourgogne-Franche-Comté, France. The station is located on the Moret-Lyon railway. The station is served by Intercités (long distance) and TER (local) services operated by the SNCF.

== Train services ==
The station is served by intercity and regional trains towards Cosne-sur-Loire, Nevers and Paris.
