= Pouilly-sur-Loire station =

Railway station in Pouilly-sur-Loire, France

Pouilly-sur-Loire
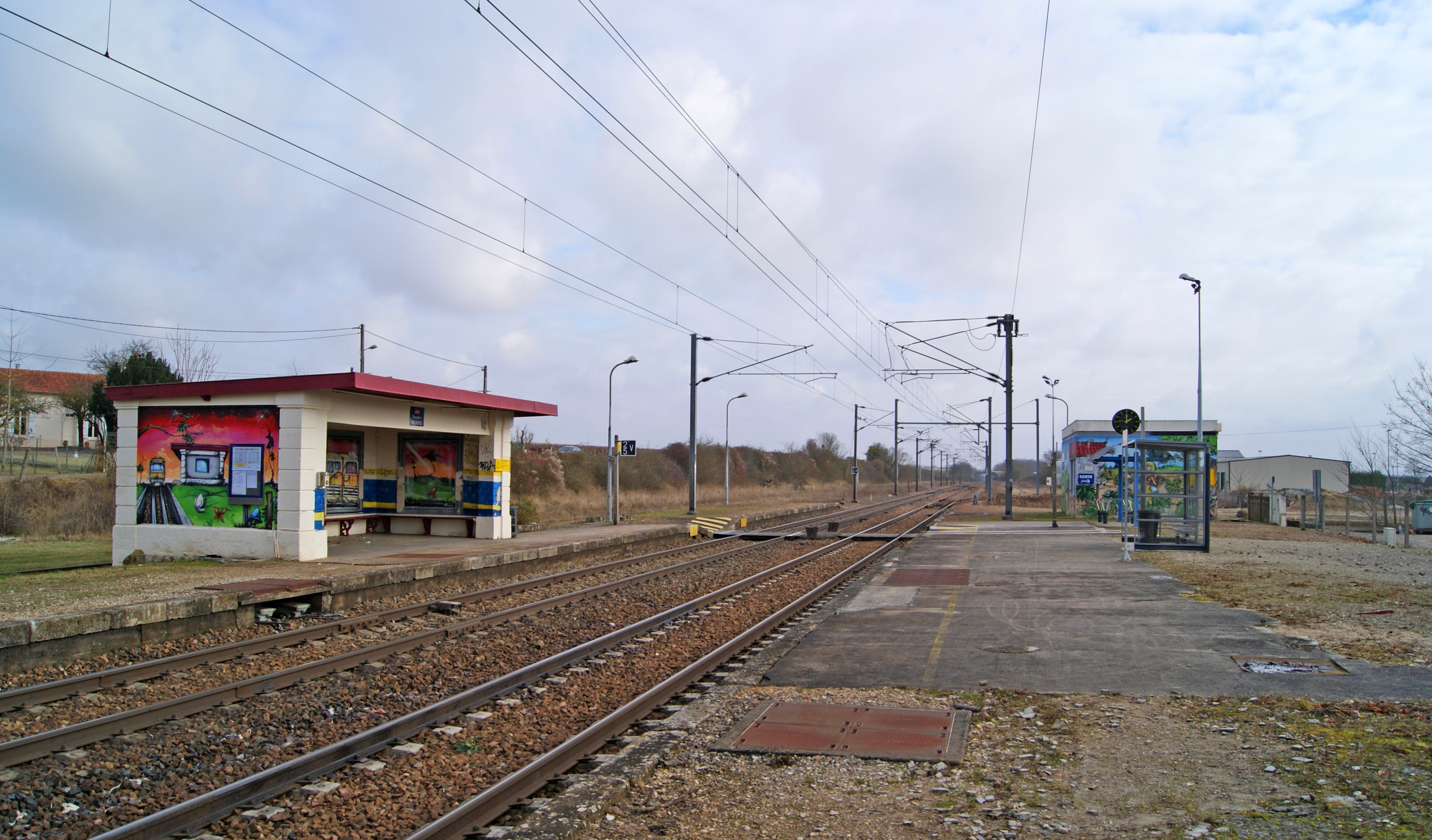
- Pouilly sur Loire station

General information
- Location: Pouilly-sur-Loire, Nièvre, Bourgogne-Franche-Comté; France
- Coordinates: 47°16′58″N 2°57′49″E
- Line: Moret-Lyon railway
- Platforms: 2
- Tracks: 2

Other information
- Station code: 87696179

Services
| Preceding station | TER Bourgogne-Franche-Comté | Following station |
|---|---|---|
| Tracy-Sancerre towards Cosne-sur-Loire | TER | Mesves-Bulcy towards Nevers-le-Banlay |
Location

Pouilly-sur-Loire is a railway station in Pouilly-sur-Loire, Bourgogne-Franche-Comté, France. The station is located on the Moret-Lyon railway. The station is served by TER (local) services operated by SNCF.

== Train services ==
The following train services serve the station as of 2017:

- local service (TER Bourgogne-Franche-Comté) Cosne-sur-Loire - La Charité - Nevers
