= Boisgibault =

Boisgibault may refer to:

- Boisgibault, Nièvre, a village within Tracy-sur-Loire, Nièvre, France
- Château de Boisgibault, Ardon, Loiret, France
- Louis Boisgibault (born 1962), French professor and author
