= France rail pass =

The France Rail Pass was a railway pass offered to non-European residents for travel on the French national railway network. Available until December 2018, it provided three to nine days of rail travel within a one-month period and was marketed by Société Nationale des Chemins de fer Français (SNCF) Voyages Développement, or French railway.

Following the discontinuation of the France Rail Pass, rail passes available for travel within France include the Interrail One Country Pass France for residents outside Europe.

== History ==
After contributing to the success of InterRail and Eurail passes, SNCF created the France Rail Pass to allow foreign tourists to discover France.

As of 2025, the Eurail offers the "Eurail France Pass"

== How it worked ==
The France Rail Pass works mainly on the national rail network of France and is available for adults and children. The pass can be used throughout France and for trains departing France for other European destinations. Reservations are compulsory on departures for destinations outside France.

== France Rail Passes ==
=== France Rail Pass Premium ===
Created in 2010, the France Rail Pass Premium provided unlimited extensive train travel on the national network of France with the benefits of a private concierge service for amenities such as hotel and restaurant reservations.

=== Regular France Rail Pass ===
Four different types of France Rail Passes were available:

- The Regular France Rail Pass provides unlimited train travel on the French national rail network. It is for adults aged 26 to 59 years old.
- The France Rail Pass Saver was available for two to five people traveling as a group.
- The France Rail Pass Youth was available for travelers aged 12 to 26.
- The France Rail Pass Senior was available to travelers over 60 years old and can only be used in first class.

== Eligibility ==
The France Rail Pass could be purchased by non-European residents except residents of North Africa and Turkey. The France Rail Pass could only be purchased through the official Rail Europe distributor websites.

== Trains ==
=== French trains ===
The France Rail Pass allowed travels on domestic trains:

- Train à Grande Vitesse (TGV) is a high speed train. Since its 1981 launch, TGV is the fastest high speed train in Europe and carries over 100 million travelers a year.
- The Téoz trains serve all French destinations not already serviced by TGV trains. Téoz trains are refurbished versions of the Corail trains redesigned to offer more comfort.
- Intercités trains connect main regional cities to other French cities.
- With an exceptional rail network of more than 30,000 kilometers, TER is the link between bigger cities and smaller towns.
- Lunéa trains provide discounted night travel from Paris to the South of France.
- Premium European Trains
  - One of the most famous trains in the world, Eurostar transports travelers from the center of Paris directly to the heart of London, passing through 52 kilometers of the Channel Tunnel in only 20 minutes.
  - Thalys is a high speed train linking France to Belgium, Germany and the Netherlands.
  - The TGV Lyria was set up by the Swiss and the French railways and provides travel between France and Switzerland.
  - The Elipsos trains are night trains providing service to Spain with comfortable cabins including dedicated restrooms.

== See also ==
- Rail Europe
- Eurail
