= Pougues-les-Eaux station =

Railway station in Pougues-les-Eaux, France

Pougues-les-Eaux
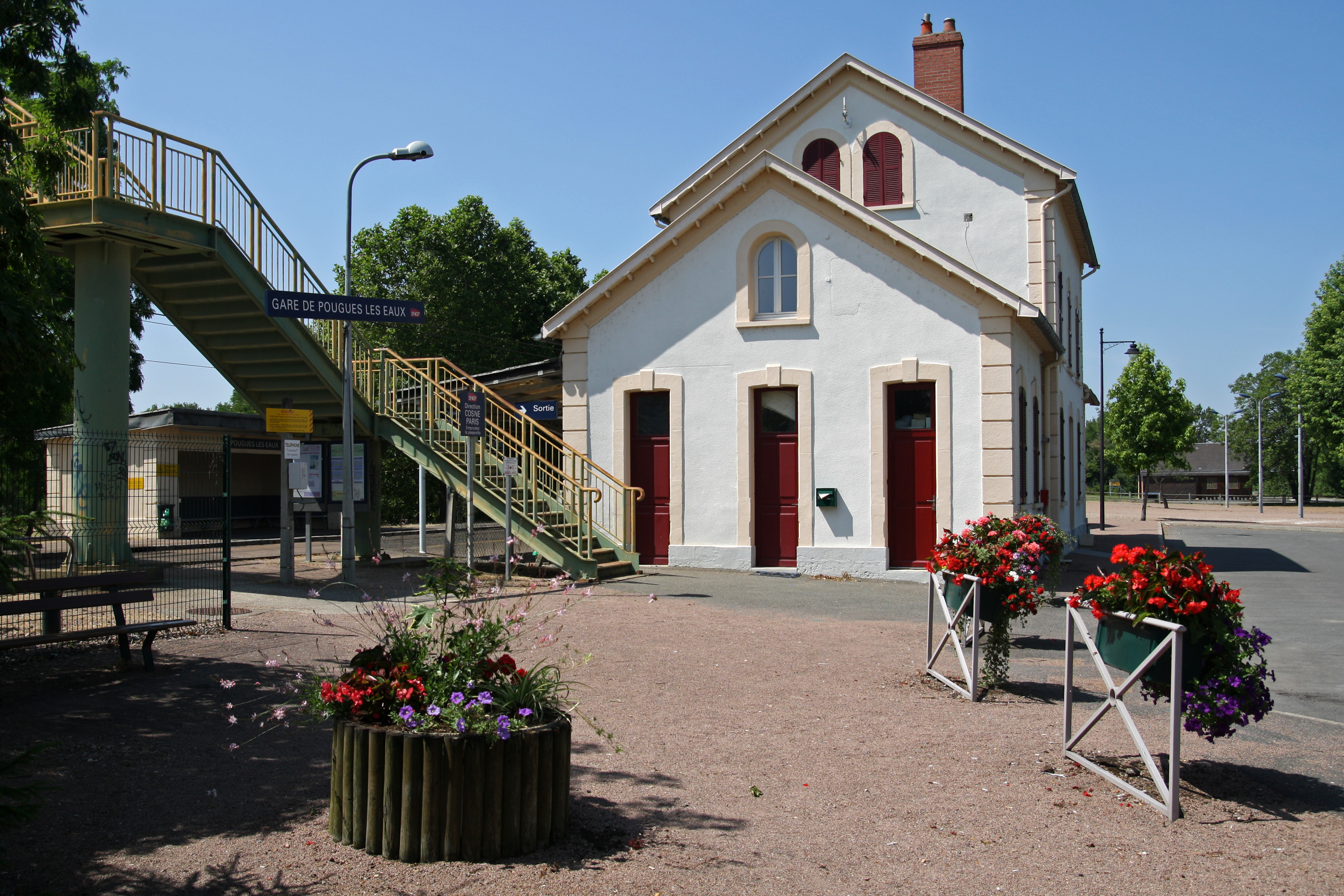
- Pougues-les-Eaux station

General information
- Location: Pougues-les-Eaux, Nièvre, Bourgogne-Franche-Comté; France
- Coordinates: 47°04′36″N 3°05′37″E
- Line: Moret-Lyon railway
- Platforms: 2
- Tracks: 2

Other information
- Station code: 87696211

Services
Preceding station	SNCF	Following station
La Charité towards Paris-Bercy	Intercités	Fourchambault towards Nevers
Preceding station	TER Bourgogne-Franche-Comté	Following station
Tronsanges towards Cosne-sur-Loire	TER	Garchizy towards Nevers-le-Banlay
Location

Pougues-les-Eaux is a railway station in Pougues-les-Eaux, Bourgogne-Franche-Comté, France. The station is located on the Moret-Lyon railway. The station is served by Intercités (long distance) and TER (local) services operated by SNCF.

== Train services ==
The station is served by intercity and regional trains towards Cosne-sur-Loire, Nevers and Paris.

- intercity services (Intercités) Paris - Montargis - Nevers
- local service (TER Bourgogne-Franche-Comté) Cosne-sur-Loire - La Charité - Nevers
