= Fourchambault station =

Railway station in Fourchambault, France

Fourchambault
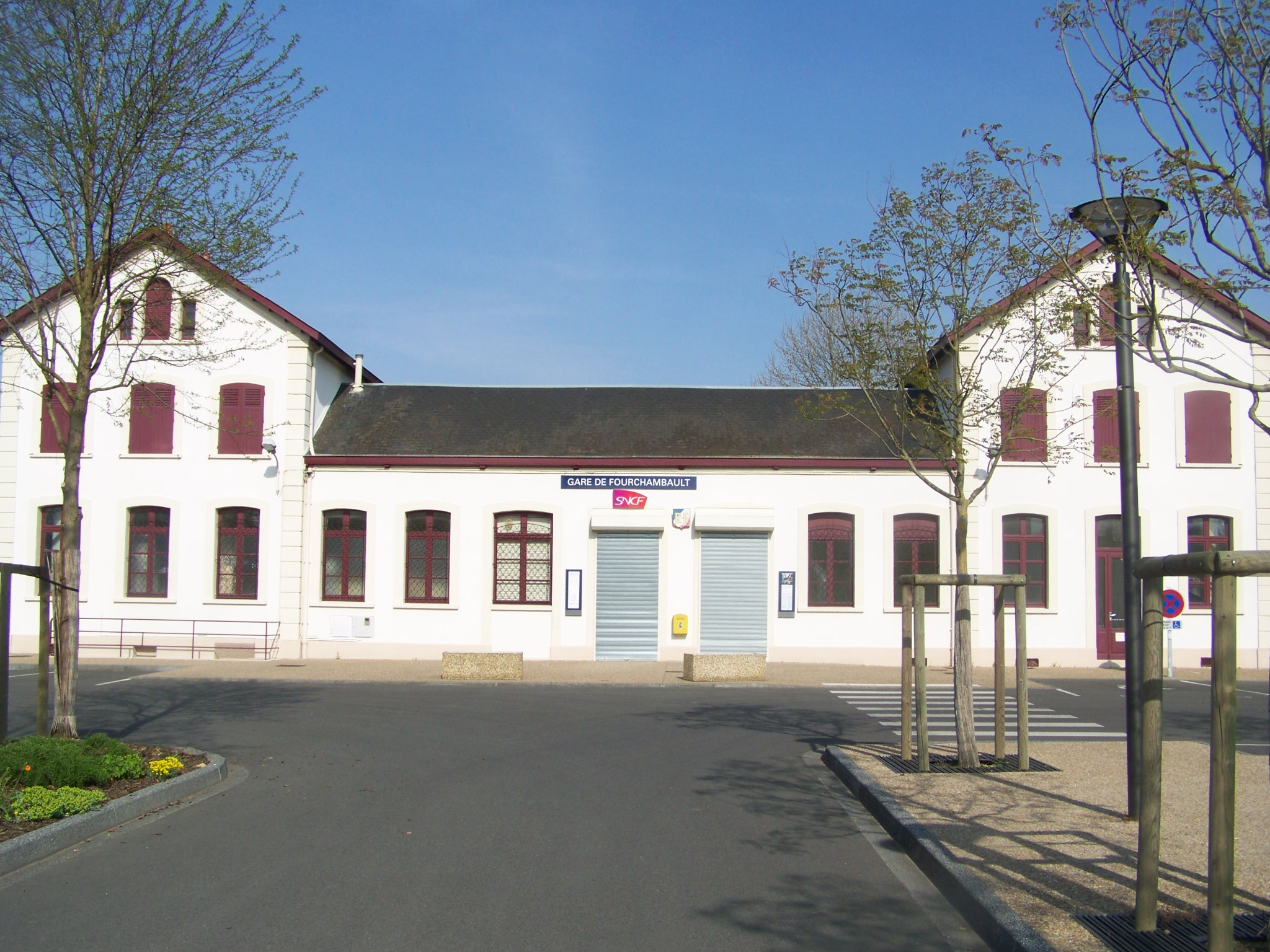
- Gare de Fourchambault

General information
- Location: Fourchambault, Nièvre, Bourgogne-Franche-Comté; France
- Coordinates: 47°01′08″N 3°05′14″E
- Line: Moret-Lyon railway
- Platforms: 2
- Tracks: 2

Other information
- Station code: 87696229

Services
Preceding station	SNCF	Following station
Pougues-les-Eaux towards Paris-Bercy	Intercités	Nevers Terminus
Preceding station	TER Bourgogne-Franche-Comté	Following station
Garchizy towards Cosne-sur-Loire	TER	Vauzelles towards Nevers-le-Banlay
Location

Fourchambault is a railway station in Fourchambault, Bourgogne-Franche-Comté, France. The station is located on the Moret-Lyon railway. The station is served by Intercités (long distance) and TER (local) services operated by SNCF.

== Train services ==
The station is served by intercity and regional trains towards Cosne-sur-Loire, Nevers and Paris.
