= Gien station =

Railway station in Gien, France

Gien
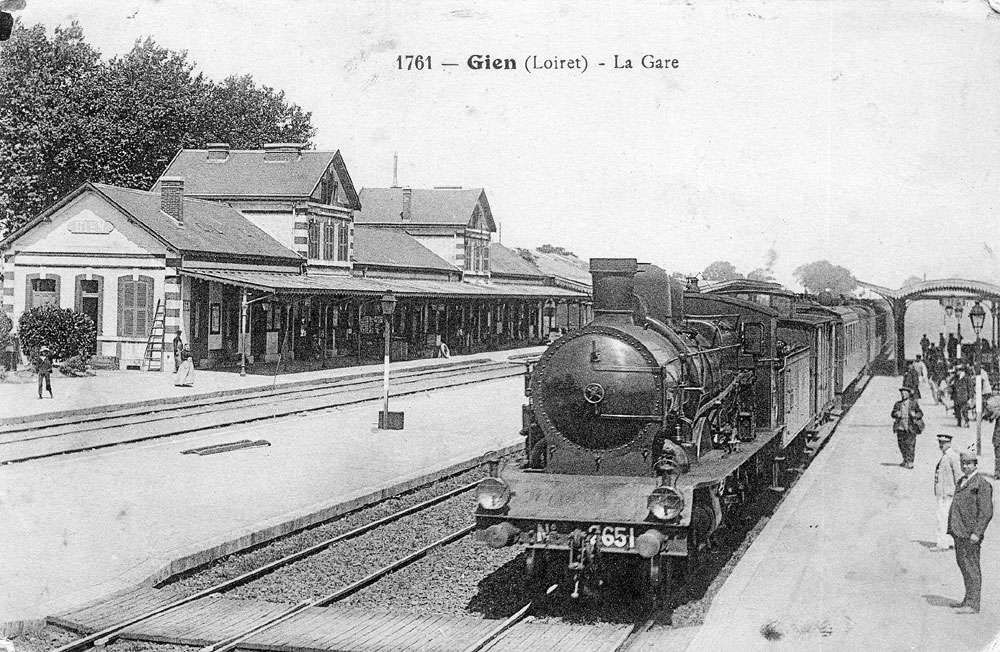
- Gare de Gien in the days of steam trains

General information
- Location: Gien, Loiret, Centre-Val de Loire; France
- Coordinates: 47°41′56″N 2°38′12″E
- Line: Moret-Lyon railway
- Platforms: 5
- Tracks: 5

Other information
- Station code: 87684290

Services
Preceding station	SNCF	Following station
Nogent-sur-Vernisson towards Paris-Bercy	Intercités	Briare towards Nevers
Location

Gien is a railway station in Gien, Centre-Val de Loire, France. The station is on the Moret-Lyon railway. The station is served by Intercités (long distance) services operated by SNCF between Paris and Nevers.
