= Tracy–Sancerre station =

Railway station in Tracy-sur-Loire, France

Tracy–Sancerre
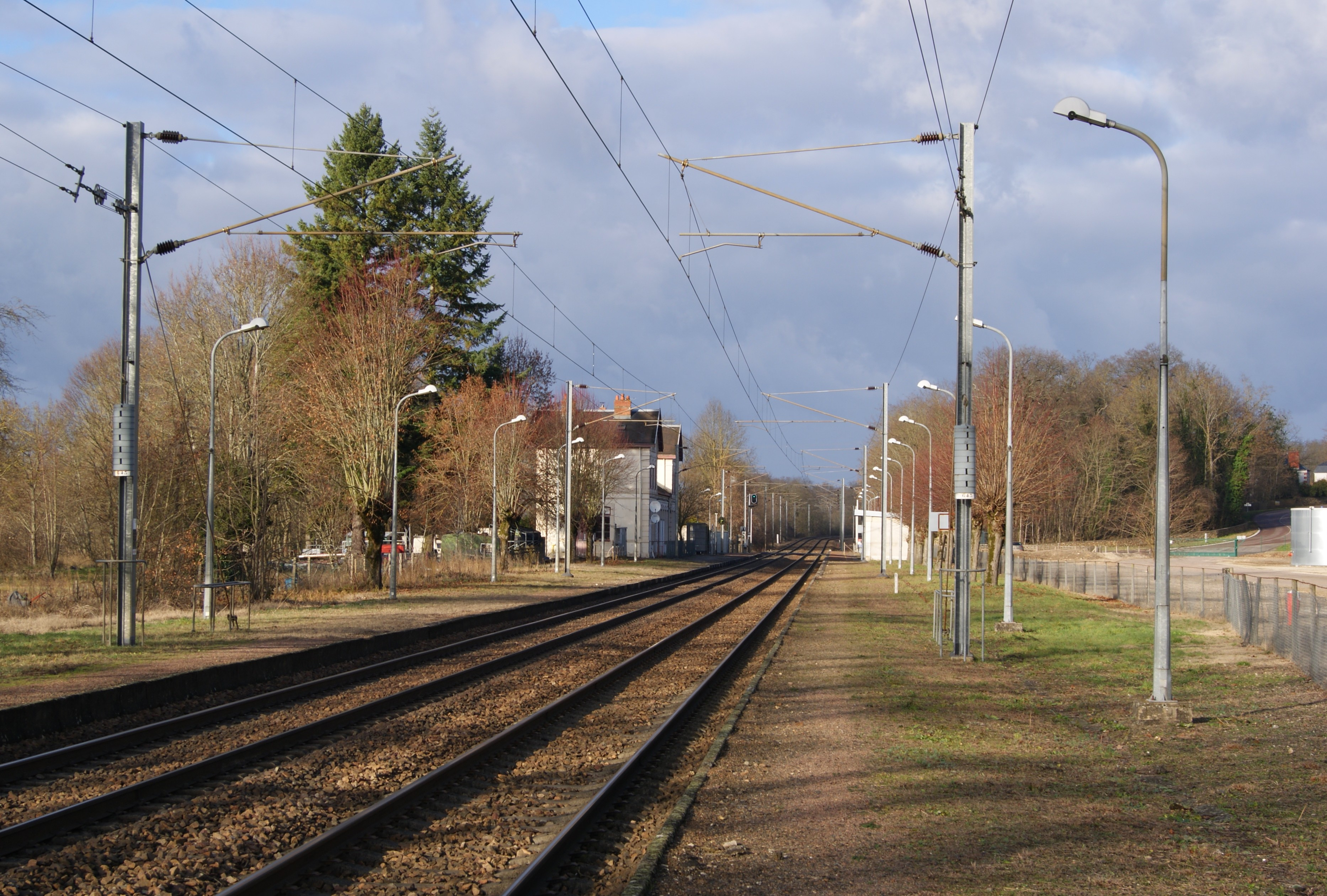
- Tracy Sancerre station

General information
- Location: Tracy-sur-Loire, Nièvre, Bourgogne-Franche-Comté; France
- Coordinates: 47°20′13″N 2°52′48″E
- Line: Moret-Lyon railway
- Platforms: 2
- Tracks: 2

Other information
- Station code: 87696161

Services
Preceding station	SNCF	Following station
Cosne-sur-Loire towards Paris-Bercy	Intercités	La Charité towards Nevers
Preceding station	TER Bourgogne-Franche-Comté	Following station
Cosne-sur-Loire Terminus	TER	Pouilly-sur-Loire towards Nevers-le-Banlay
Location

Tracy–Sancerre is a railway station in Tracy-sur-Loire, Bourgogne-Franche-Comté, France. The station is located on the Moret-Lyon railway. The station is served by Intercités and TER (local) services operated by SNCF.

== Train services ==
The station is served by intercity and regional trains towards Cosne-sur-Loire, Nevers and Paris.
