= Nogent-sur-Vernisson station =

Railway station in Nogent-sur-Vernisson, France

Nogent-sur-Vernisson
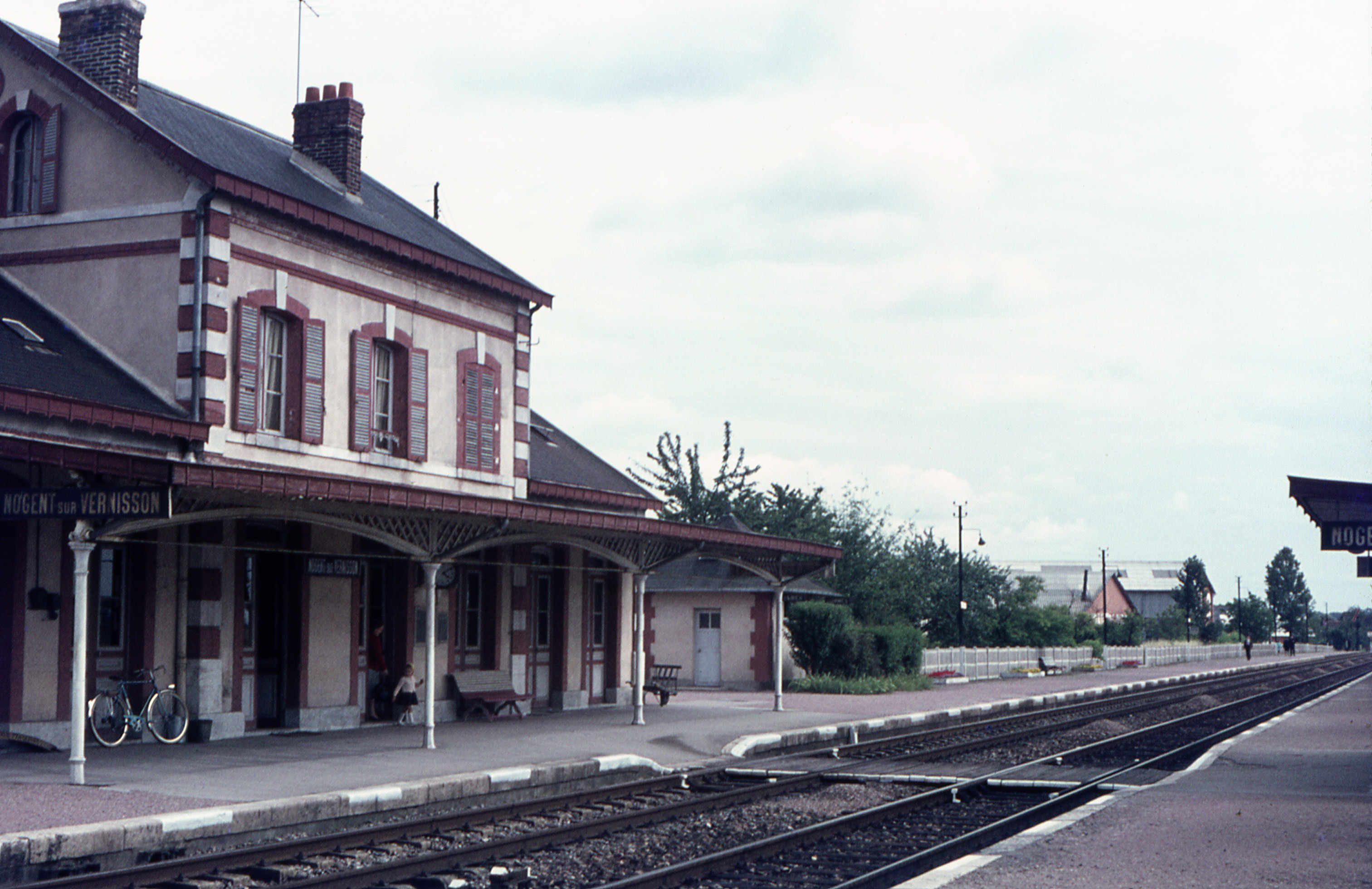
- Gare de Nogent-sur-Vernisson in 1966 (before electrification)

General information
- Location: Nogent-sur-Vernisson, Loiret, Centre-Val de Loire; France
- Coordinates: 47°51′10″N 2°44′15″E
- Line: Moret-Lyon railway
- Platforms: 2
- Tracks: 2

Other information
- Station code: 87684274

Services
Preceding station	SNCF	Following station
Montargis towards Paris-Bercy	Intercités	Gien towards Nevers
Location

Nogent-sur-Vernisson is a railway station in Nogent-sur-Vernisson, Centre-Val de Loire, France. The station is located on the Moret-Lyon railway. The station is served by Intercités (long distance) services operated by SNCF between Paris and Nevers.
