= Briare station =

Railway station in Briare, Centre-Val de Loire, France

Briare
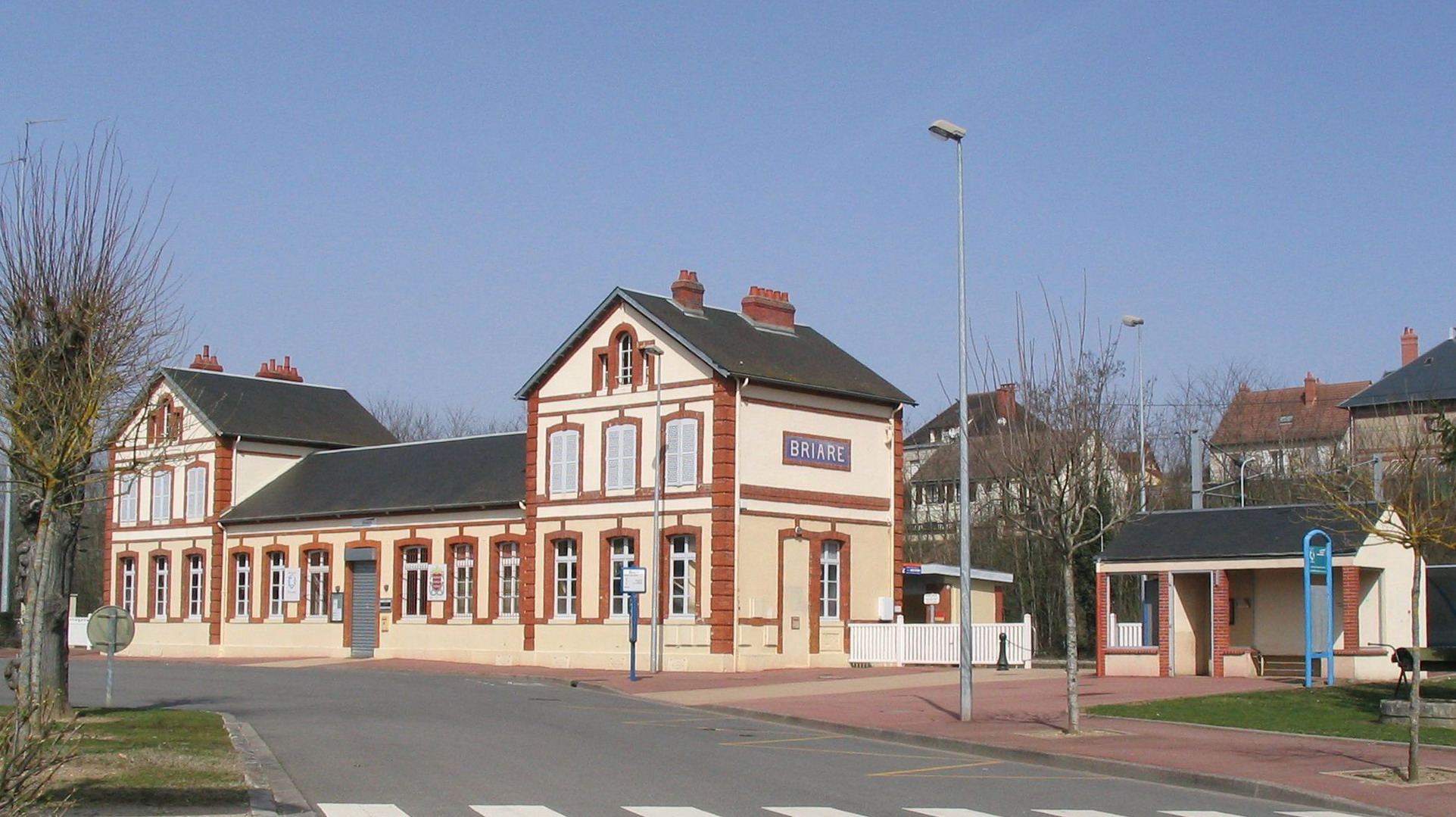
- The station in 2004

General information
- Location: Gare SNCF; 45250 Briare; Centre-Val de Loire; France
- Coordinates: 47°38′47″N 2°44′00″E
- Owner: SNCF
- Operator: SNCF
- Line: Moret-Lyon railway
- Platforms: 2
- Tracks: 2

Other information
- Station code: 87696088

Services
Preceding station	SNCF	Following station
Gien towards Paris-Bercy	Intercités	Cosne-sur-Loire towards Nevers
Location

Briare station (French: Gare de Briare) is a railway station in Briare, Centre-Val de Loire, France. The station is located on the Moret-Lyon railway. The station is served by Intercités (long distance) services operated by SNCF between Paris and Nevers.
