= La Charité-sur-Loire =

- Commune
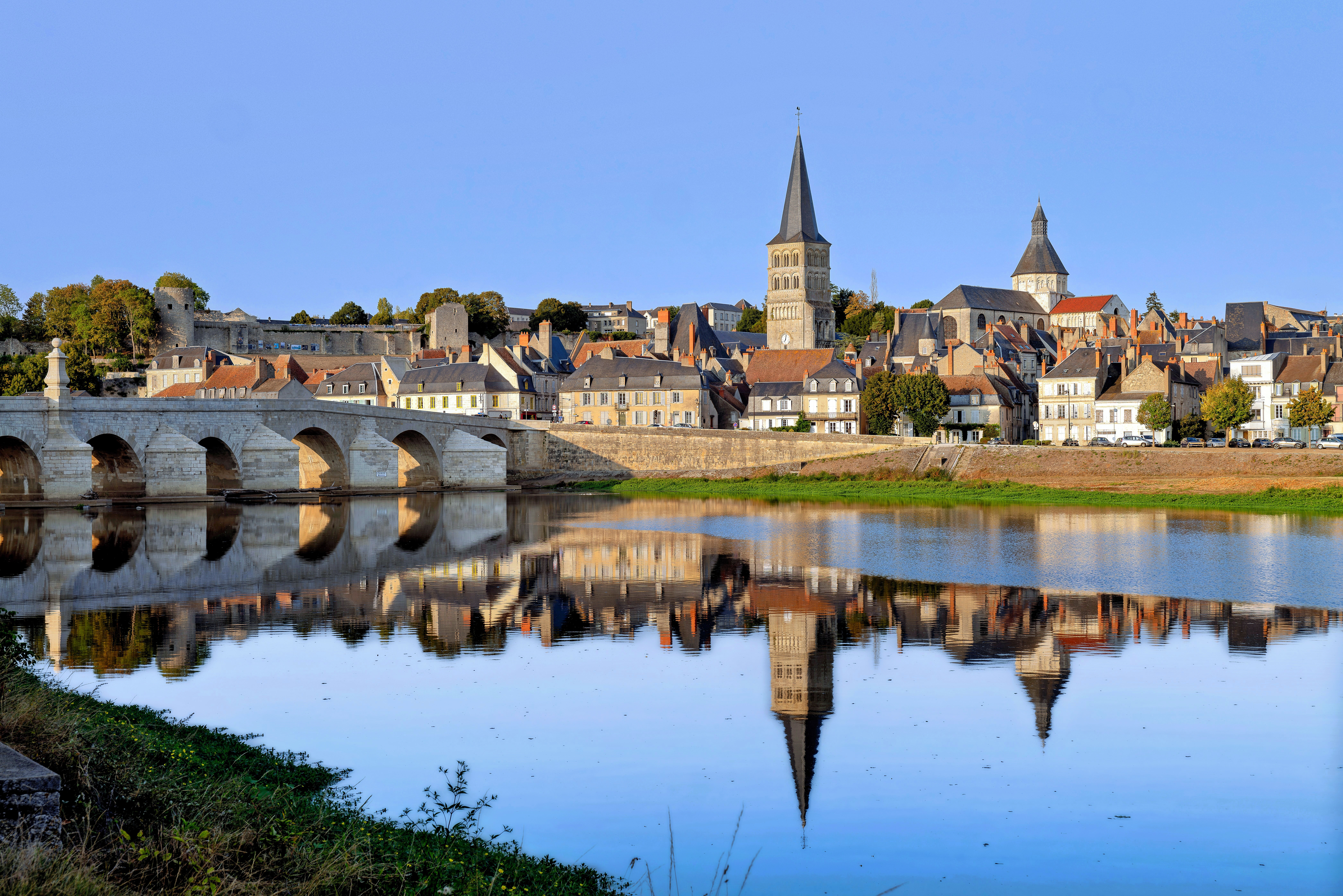
- La Charité-sur-Loire seen from across the Loire

- Coat of arms
- Location of La Charité-sur-Loire
- Location within France Location within Bourgogne-Franche-Comté
- Coordinates: 47°10′40″N 3°01′11″E
- Country: France
- Region: Bourgogne-Franche-Comté
- Department: Nièvre
- Arrondissement: Cosne-Cours-sur-Loire
- Canton: La Charité-sur-Loire
- Intercommunality: Les Bertranges

Government
  - Mayor (2020–2026): Henri Valès
- Area^{1}: 15.78 km^{2} (6.09 sq mi)
- Highest elevation: 215 m (705 ft)
- Lowest elevation: 153 m (502 ft)
- Population (2023): 4,705
  - Density: 298.2/km^{2} (772.2/sq mi)
- Time zone: UTC+01:00 (CET)
  - Summer (DST): UTC+02:00 (CEST)
- INSEE/Postal code: 58059 /58400
- ^{1} French Land Register data, which excludes lakes, ponds, glaciers > 1 km^{2} (0.386 sq mi or 247 acres) and river estuaries.

La Charité-sur-Loire, known simply as La Charité until 1961, is a riverside commune in the western part of the French department of Nièvre. It is located on the departmental border with Cher, which is also the regional border with Centre-Val de Loire.

== Geography ==
La Charité-sur-Loire lies on the right, eastern bank of the river Loire, about 25 km northwest of Nevers. La Charité station has rail connections to Nevers, Cosne-sur-Loire and Paris. The A77 autoroute (Montargis–Nevers) passes east of the town.

== History ==
The settlement of La Charité grew up around the Cluniac priory of that name (of which the present-day church of Notre-Dame de la Charité survives), founded next to the river Loire in the 11th century, and consecrated in 1107.

During the Hundred Years War, the town was liberated from the English by French forces only in 1435. Joan of Arc tried to liberate the city in 1429 but failed.

A great fire ravaged the town in 1559, leaving the nave of the priory church in a ruinous state for many years. The nave was finally restored by the late 17th century, albeit with its length diminished and the stone of the original facade repurposed in the reconstruction works.

In the second of the French Wars of Religion (1567–8), La Charité withstood eight months of siege by Catholic forces. It would later be one of the fortified towns given the status of Huguenot safe havens by the Peace of Saint-Germain-en-Laye (August 1570).

By the time of the French Revolution only a dozen monks remained in the priory, which was sold to private individuals and preserved. An improved highway that was to have been driven through the church was deflected by the report of Prosper Mérimée, the first inspector of monuments (and author of Carmen), who classed it as worth saving in 1840.

== Gallery ==
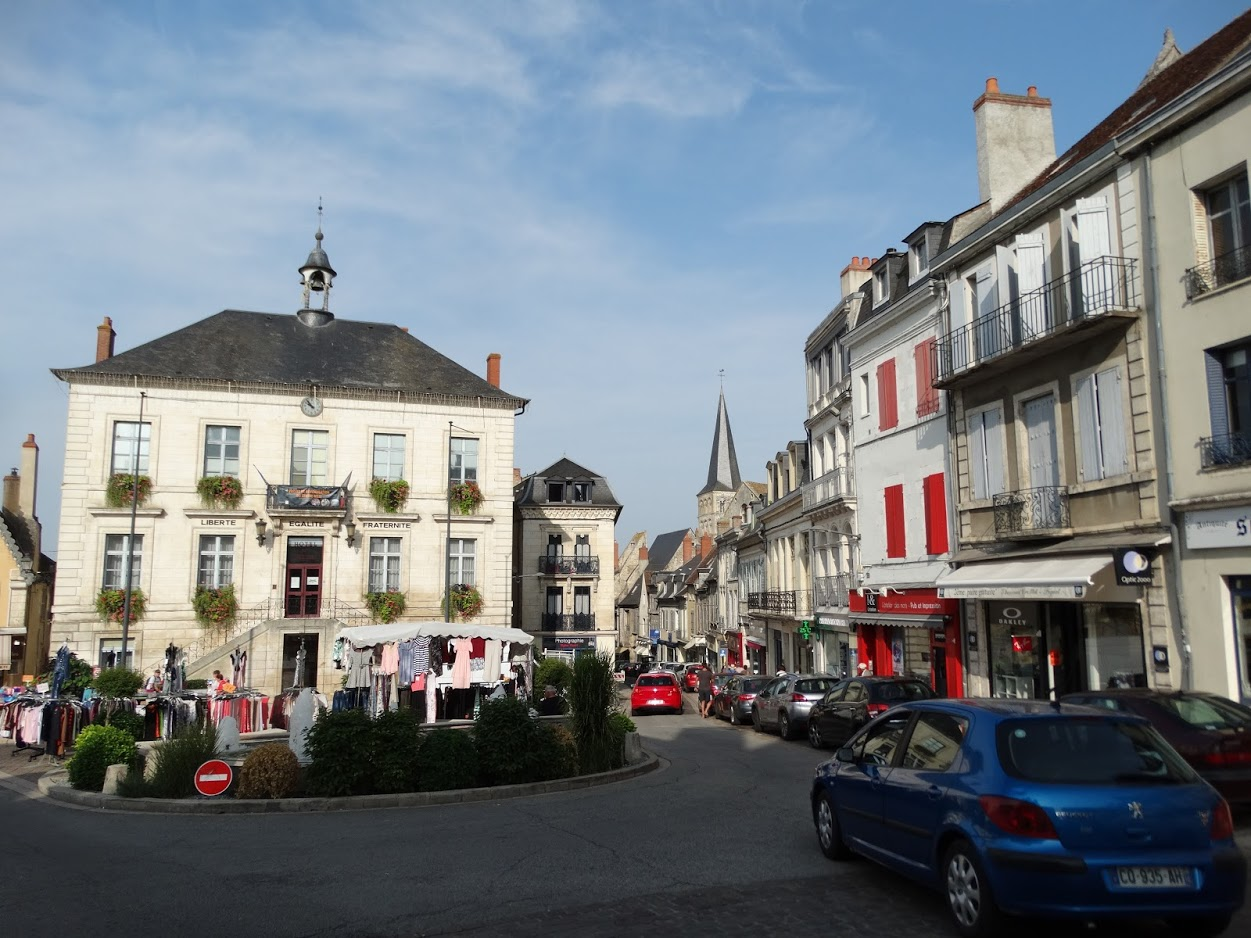

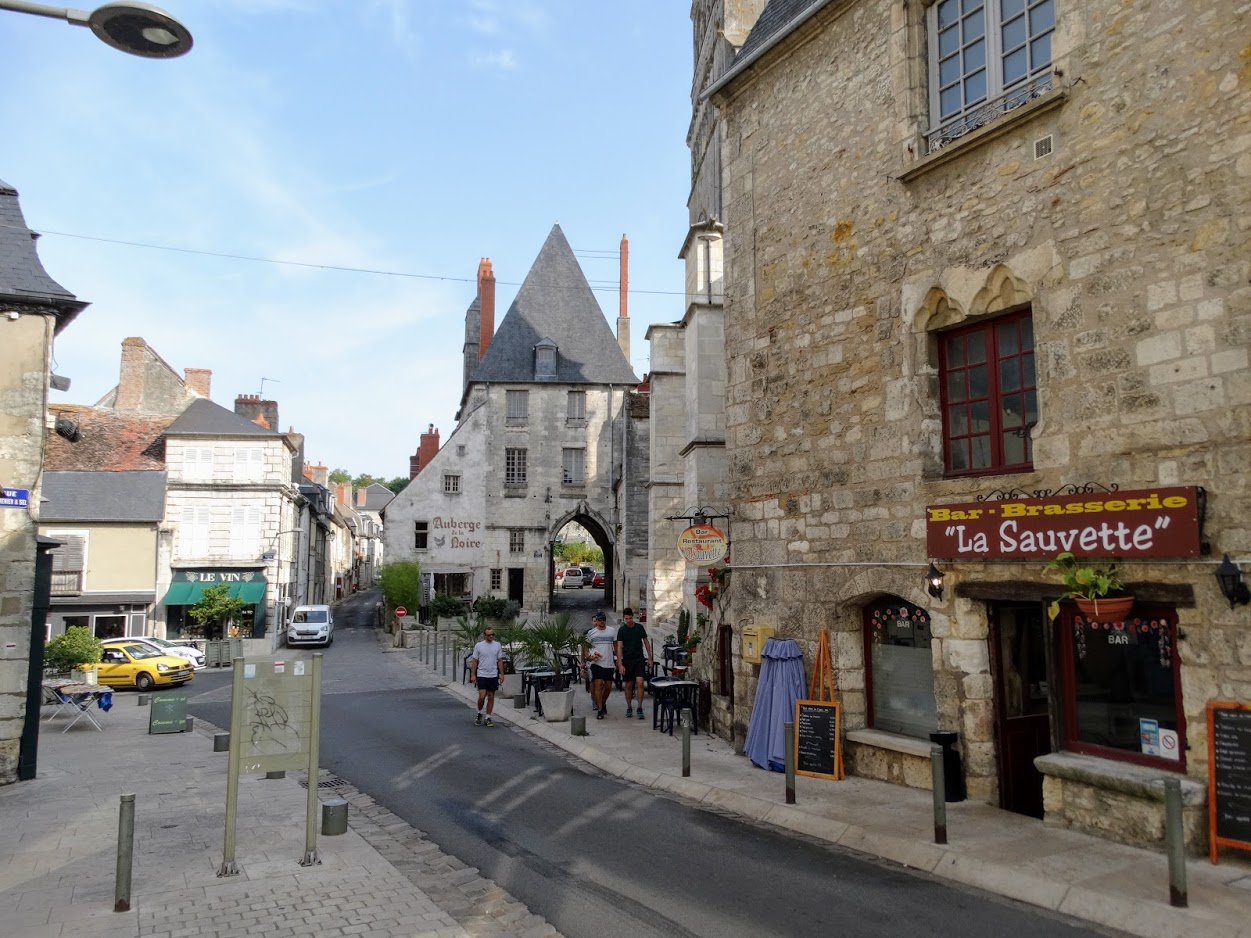

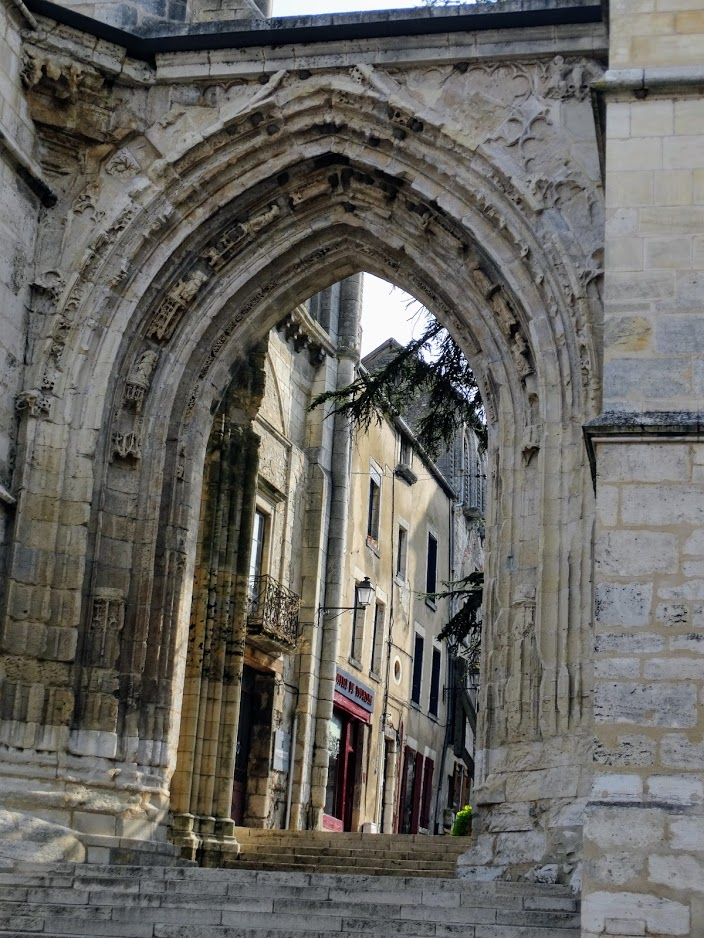

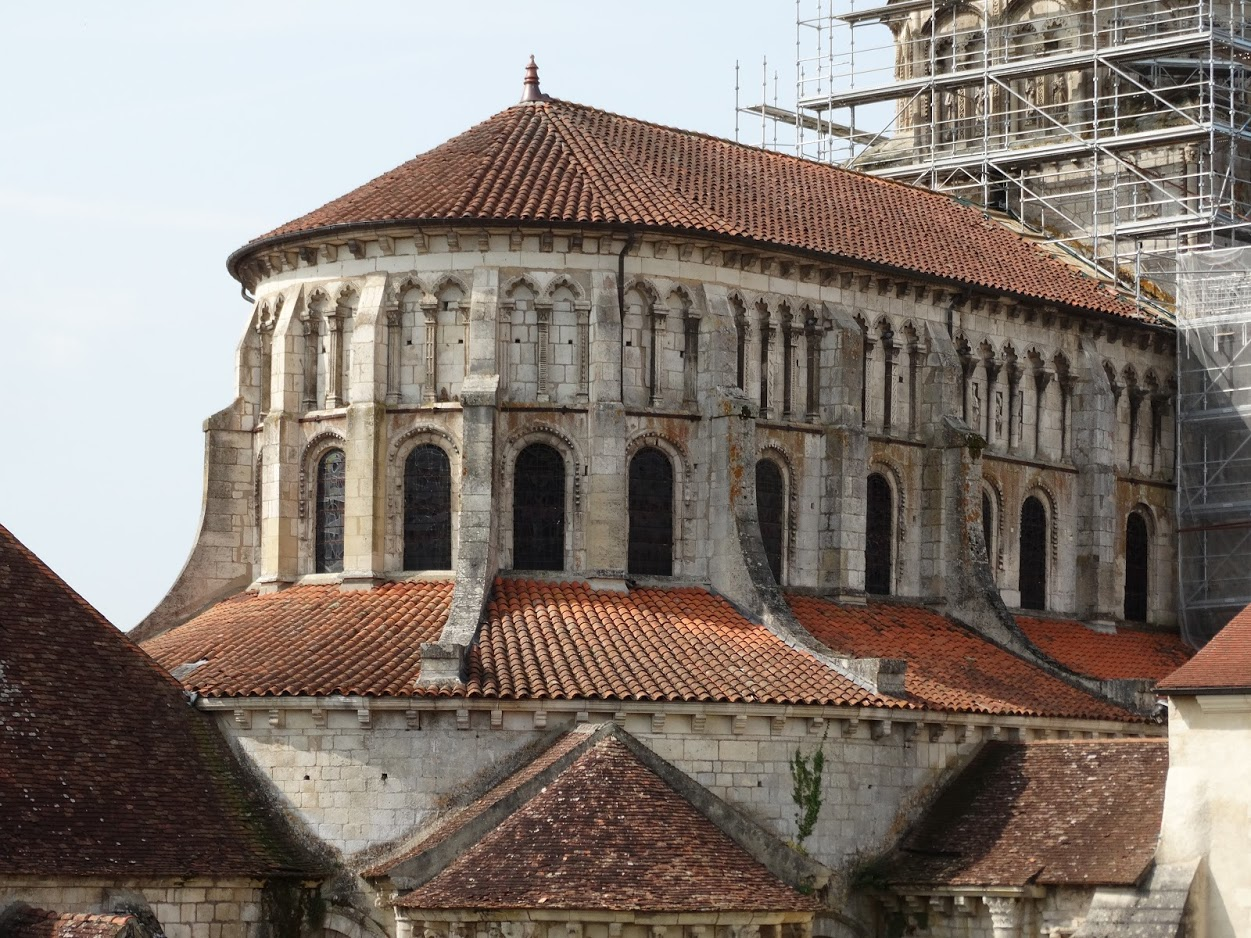

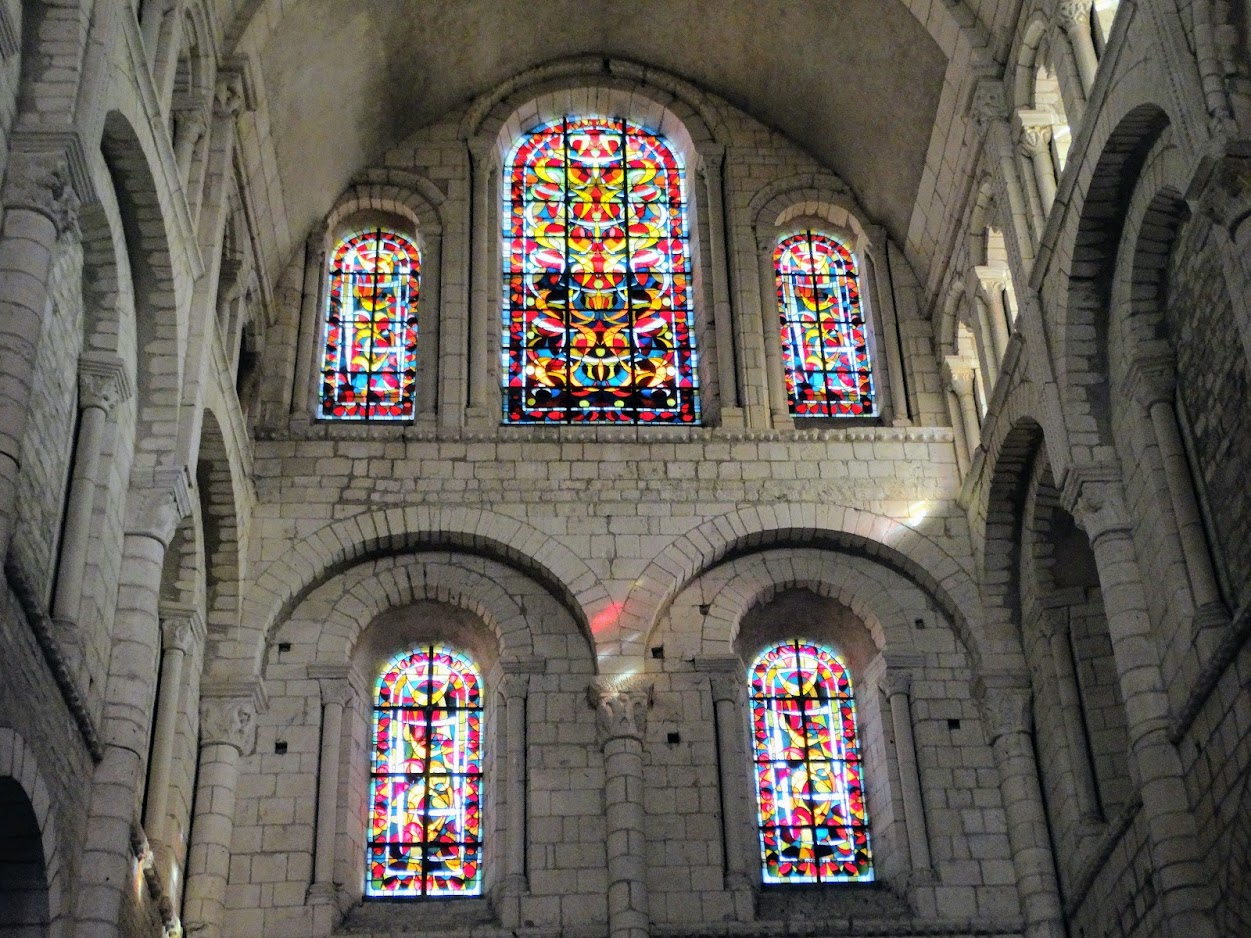

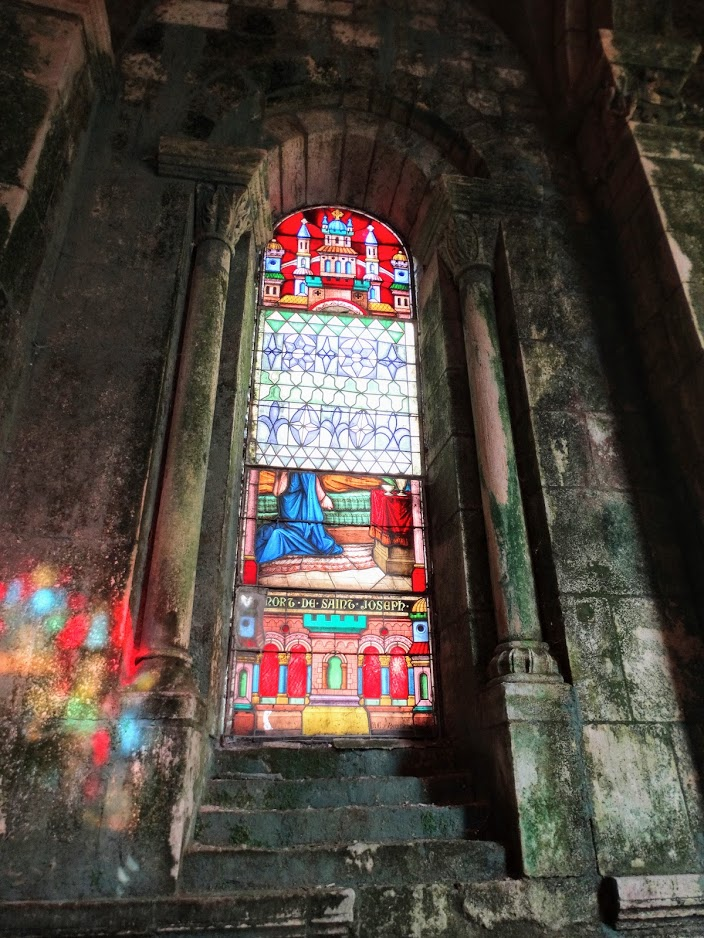

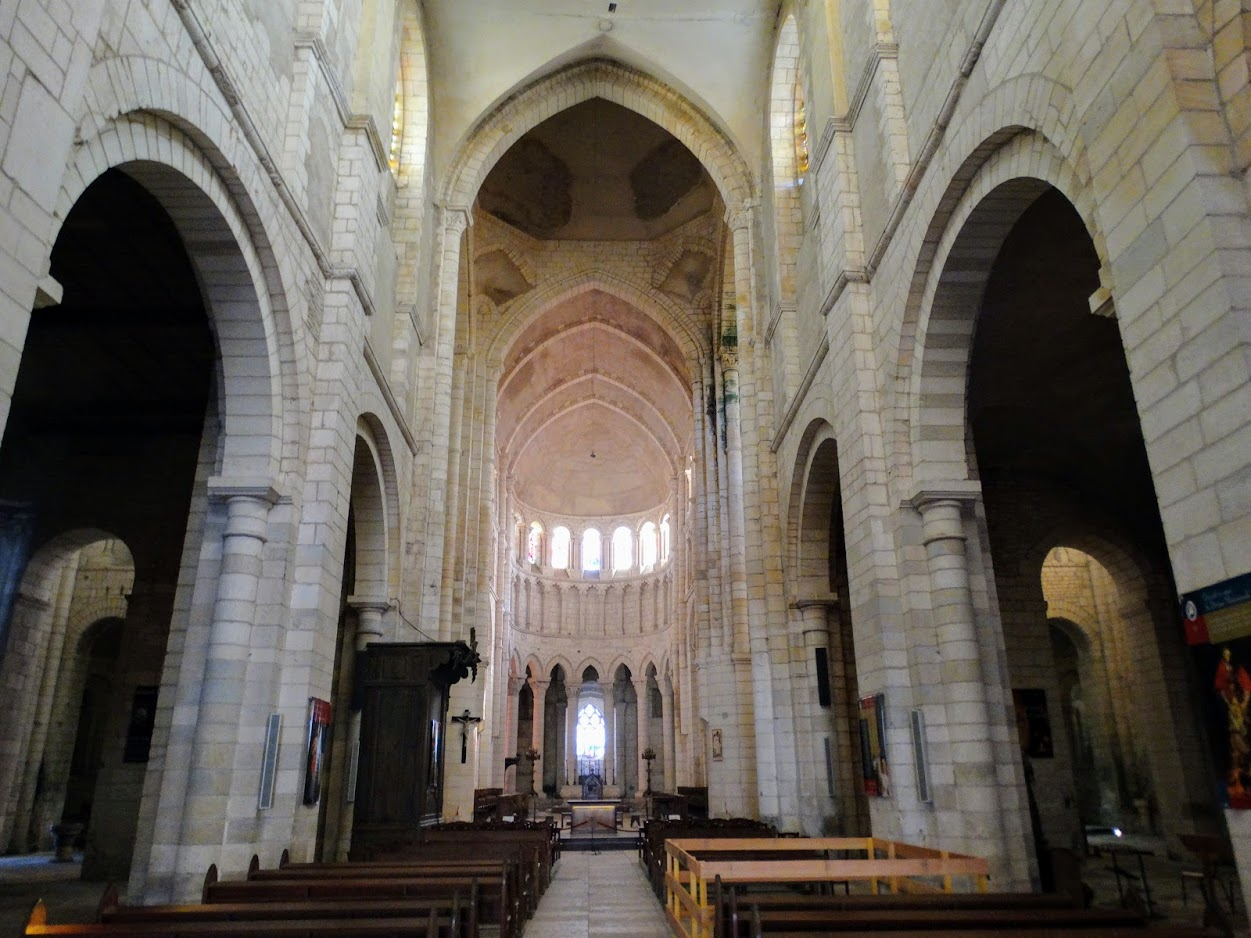

== Demographics ==
Historical population
Year	Pop.	±% p.a.
1968	6,194	—
1975	6,426	+0.53%
1982	6,416	−0.02%
1990	5,686	−1.50%
1999	5,460	−0.45%
2007	5,362	−0.23%
2012	5,080	−1.07%
2017	4,901	−0.71%
2023	4,705	−0.68%
Source: INSEE

== Sights ==
- Notre-Dame de la Charité-sur-Loire: the former Cluniac priory church. It was listed as a UNESCO World Heritage Site in 1998, as part of the Routes of Santiago de Compostela in France. It is also the burial place of Simon I de Senlis, Earl of Huntingdon-Northampton.

== See also ==
- Communes of the Nièvre department
