= Pougues-les-Eaux =

- Commune
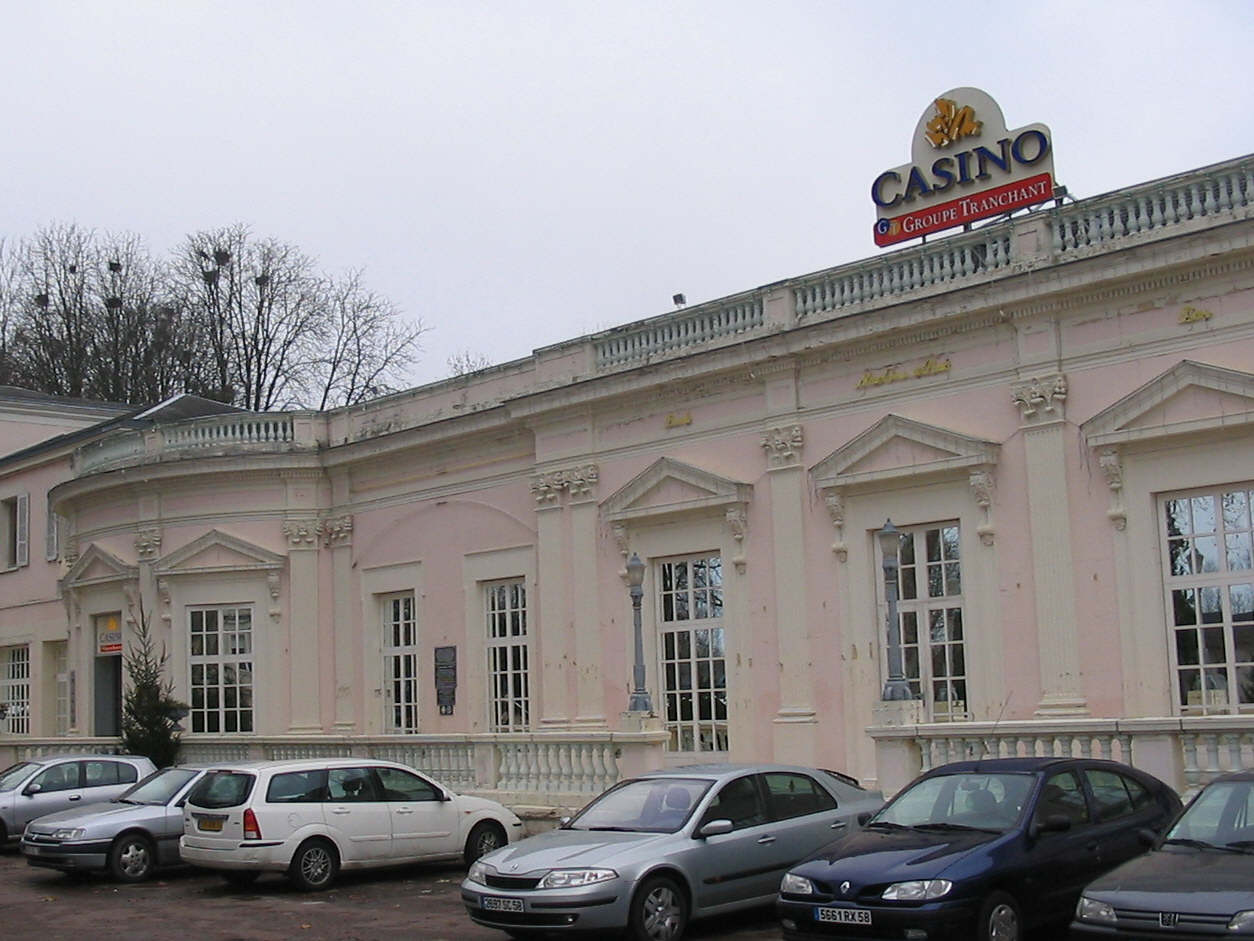
- The Casino du Nivernais, in Pougues-les-Eaux

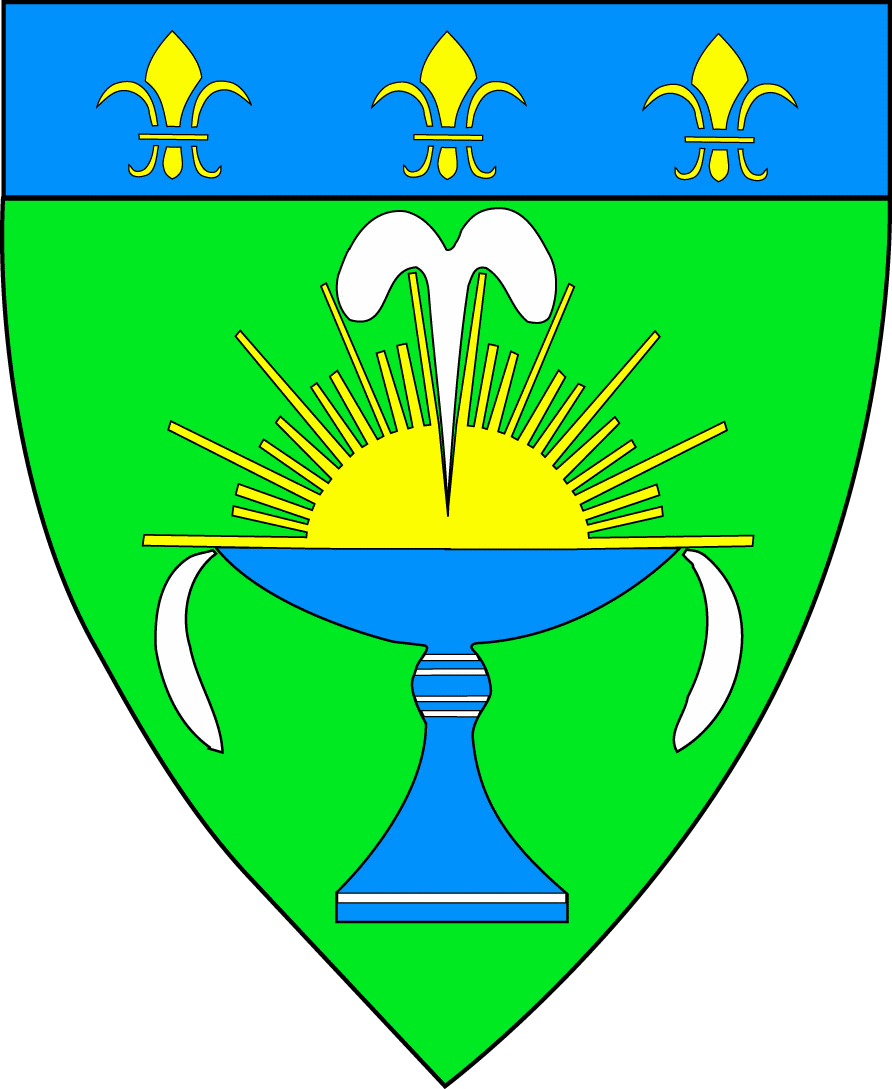
- Coat of arms
- Location of Pougues-les-Eaux
- Location within France Location within Bourgogne-Franche-Comté
- Coordinates: 47°04′31″N 3°06′08″E
- Country: France
- Region: Bourgogne-Franche-Comté
- Department: Nièvre
- Arrondissement: Nevers
- Canton: Varennes-Vauzelles
- Intercommunality: CA Nevers

Government
  - Mayor (2020–2026): Sylvie Cantrel-Anne
- Area^{1}: 12.72 km^{2} (4.91 sq mi)
- Highest elevation: 293 m (961 ft)
- Lowest elevation: 169 m (554 ft)
- Population (2023): 2,401
  - Density: 188.8/km^{2} (488.9/sq mi)
- Time zone: UTC+01:00 (CET)
  - Summer (DST): UTC+02:00 (CEST)
- INSEE/Postal code: 58214 /58320
- ^{1} French Land Register data, which excludes lakes, ponds, glaciers > 1 km^{2} (0.386 sq mi or 247 acres) and river estuaries.

Pougues-les-Eaux (French pronunciation: [puɡ lez‿o]) is a commune in the Nièvre department in central France. Pougues-les-Eaux station has rail connections to Nevers, Cosne-sur-Loire and Paris.

The commune is listed as a Village étape.

== Demographics ==
Historical population
Year	Pop.	±% p.a.
1968	1,803	—
1975	2,014	+1.59%
1982	2,260	+1.66%
1990	2,358	+0.53%
1999	2,493	+0.62%
2007	2,509	+0.08%
2012	2,398	−0.90%
2017	2,388	−0.08%
2023	2,401	+0.09%
Source: INSEE

== See also ==
- Communes of the Nièvre department
