= Faïencerie de Gien =

Coordinates: 47.6886°N 2.6208°E

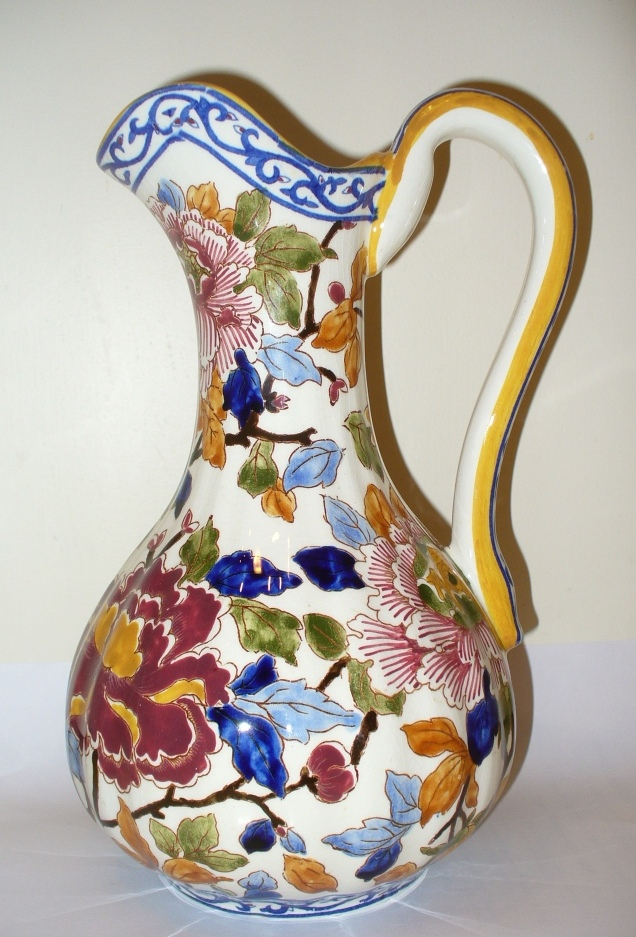
Vase

The Faïencerie de Gien is a faience (or earthenware) factory in Gien, France. It was founded in 1821 by Thomas Edme Hulm.
