= Parigny-les-Vaux =

- Commune
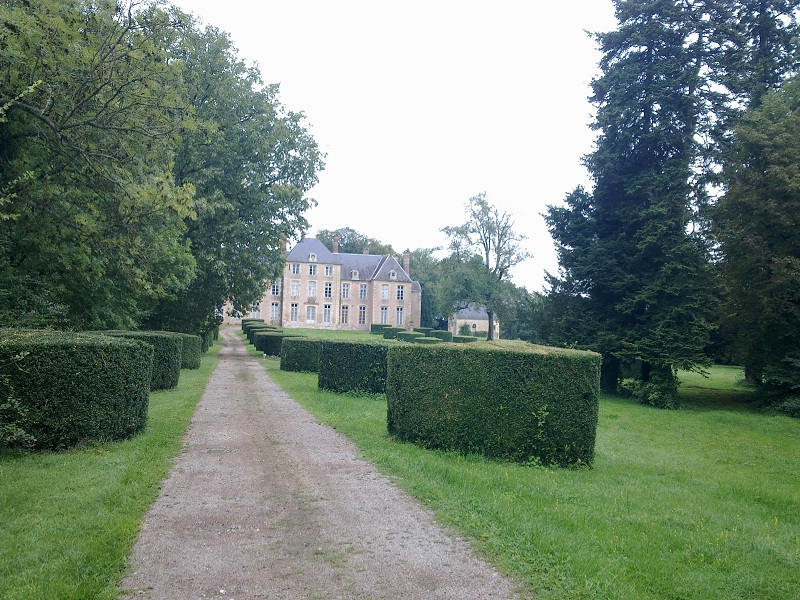
- The chateau in Parigny
- Location of Parigny-les-Vaux
- Location within France Location within Bourgogne-Franche-Comté
- Coordinates: 47°05′33″N 3°08′57″E
- Country: France
- Region: Bourgogne-Franche-Comté
- Department: Nièvre
- Arrondissement: Nevers
- Canton: Varennes-Vauzelles
- Intercommunality: CA Nevers

Government
  - Mayor (2020–2026): Jacques Mercier
- Area^{1}: 31.47 km^{2} (12.15 sq mi)
- Highest elevation: 341 m (1,119 ft)
- Lowest elevation: 186 m (610 ft)
- Population (2023): 964
  - Density: 30.6/km^{2} (79.3/sq mi)
- Time zone: UTC+01:00 (CET)
  - Summer (DST): UTC+02:00 (CEST)
- INSEE/Postal code: 58207 /58320
- ^{1} French Land Register data, which excludes lakes, ponds, glaciers > 1 km^{2} (0.386 sq mi or 247 acres) and river estuaries.

Parigny-les-Vaux (French pronunciation: [paʁiɲi le vo]) is a commune in the Nièvre department in central France.

== See also ==
- Communes of the Nièvre department
