= Varennes-Vauzelles =

- Commune
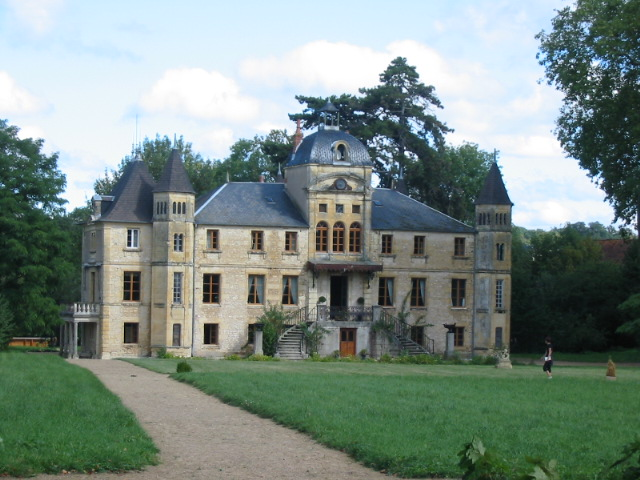
- The Chateau of Four du Vaux

- Coat of arms
- Location of Varennes-Vauzelles
- Location within France Location within Bourgogne-Franche-Comté
- Coordinates: 47°00′47″N 3°08′50″E
- Country: France
- Region: Bourgogne-Franche-Comté
- Department: Nièvre
- Arrondissement: Nevers
- Canton: Varennes-Vauzelles
- Intercommunality: CA Nevers

Government
  - Mayor (2020–2026): Olivier Sicot
- Area^{1}: 33.99 km^{2} (13.12 sq mi)
- Elevation: 195 m (640 ft)
- Highest elevation: 270 m (890 ft)
- Lowest elevation: 171 m (561 ft)
- Population (2023): 9,146
  - Density: 269.1/km^{2} (696.9/sq mi)
- Time zone: UTC+01:00 (CET)
  - Summer (DST): UTC+02:00 (CEST)
- INSEE/Postal code: 58303 /58640
- ^{1} French Land Register data, which excludes lakes, ponds, glaciers > 1 km^{2} (0.386 sq mi or 247 acres) and river estuaries.

Varennes-Vauzelles (French pronunciation: [vaʁɛn vozɛl]) is a commune in the Nièvre department in central France. It is a northwestern suburb of Nevers. Vauzelles station has rail connections to Nevers and Cosne-sur-Loire.

== Demographics ==
Historical population
Year	Pop.	±% p.a.
1968	8,025	—
1975	8,552	+0.91%
1982	10,071	+2.36%
1990	10,602	+0.64%
1999	10,211	−0.42%
2007	9,439	−0.98%
2012	9,503	+0.14%
2017	9,298	−0.44%
2023	9,146	−0.27%
Source: INSEE

== See also ==
- Communes of the Nièvre department
