= Canton of Varennes-Vauzelles =

Coordinates: 47.01°N 3.14°E

The canton of Varennes-Vauzelles is an administrative division of the Nièvre department, central France. It was created at the French canton reorganisation which came into effect in March 2015. Its seat is in Varennes-Vauzelles.

It consists of the following communes:

1. Parigny-les-Vaux
2. Pougues-les-Eaux
3. Varennes-Vauzelles
