= Tracy-sur-Loire =

- Commune
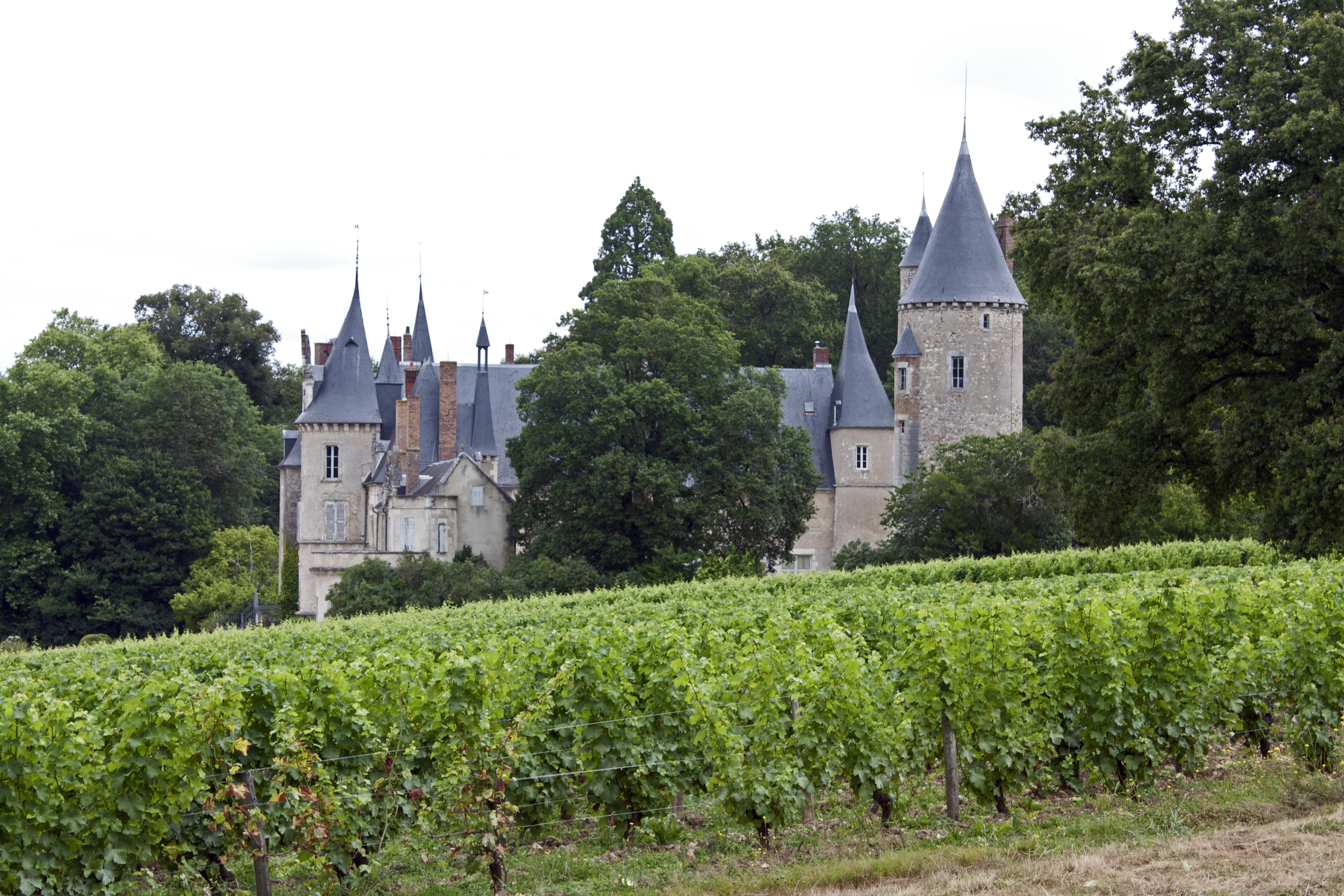
- The Château of Tracy
- Location of Tracy-sur-Loire
- Location within France Location within Bourgogne-Franche-Comté
- Coordinates: 47°19′17″N 2°53′18″E
- Country: France
- Region: Bourgogne-Franche-Comté
- Department: Nièvre
- Arrondissement: Cosne-Cours-sur-Loire
- Canton: Pouilly-sur-Loire
- Intercommunality: Coeur de Loire

Government
  - Mayor (2020–2026): Sylvain Cointat
- Area^{1}: 23.07 km^{2} (8.91 sq mi)
- Elevation: 153 m (502 ft)
- Highest elevation: 222 m (728 ft)
- Lowest elevation: 142 m (466 ft)
- Population (2023): 975
  - Density: 42.3/km^{2} (109/sq mi)
- Time zone: UTC+01:00 (CET)
  - Summer (DST): UTC+02:00 (CEST)
- INSEE/Postal code: 58295 /58150
- ^{1} French Land Register data, which excludes lakes, ponds, glaciers > 1 km^{2} (0.386 sq mi or 247 acres) and river estuaries.

Tracy-sur-Loire (French pronunciation: [tʁasi syʁ lwaʁ], literally Tracy on Loire) is a commune in the Nièvre department in central France. It is located 50 kilometres (31 mi) north of Nevers, on the right bank of the middle Loire river, opposite Sancerre. Tracy-Sancerre station has rail connections to Nevers, Cosne-sur-Loire and Paris.

== Boisgibault ==
Boisgibault (or Bois Gibault) is the village that merged to form the commune Tracy-sur-Loire. It is known for its white wine Pouilly-Fumé, the Natural Reserve of Val de Loire created by decree 95-1240 on 21 November 1995, and an islet on the Loire. One can see there, in the alluvial forest and the meadows, dragonflies, 30 species of fish, 190 species of birds, beavers, 477 species of plants. This village should not be confused with Château de Boisgibault which is located about a hundred kilometers away.

== See also ==
- Communes of the Nièvre department
