= Gien =

- Commune
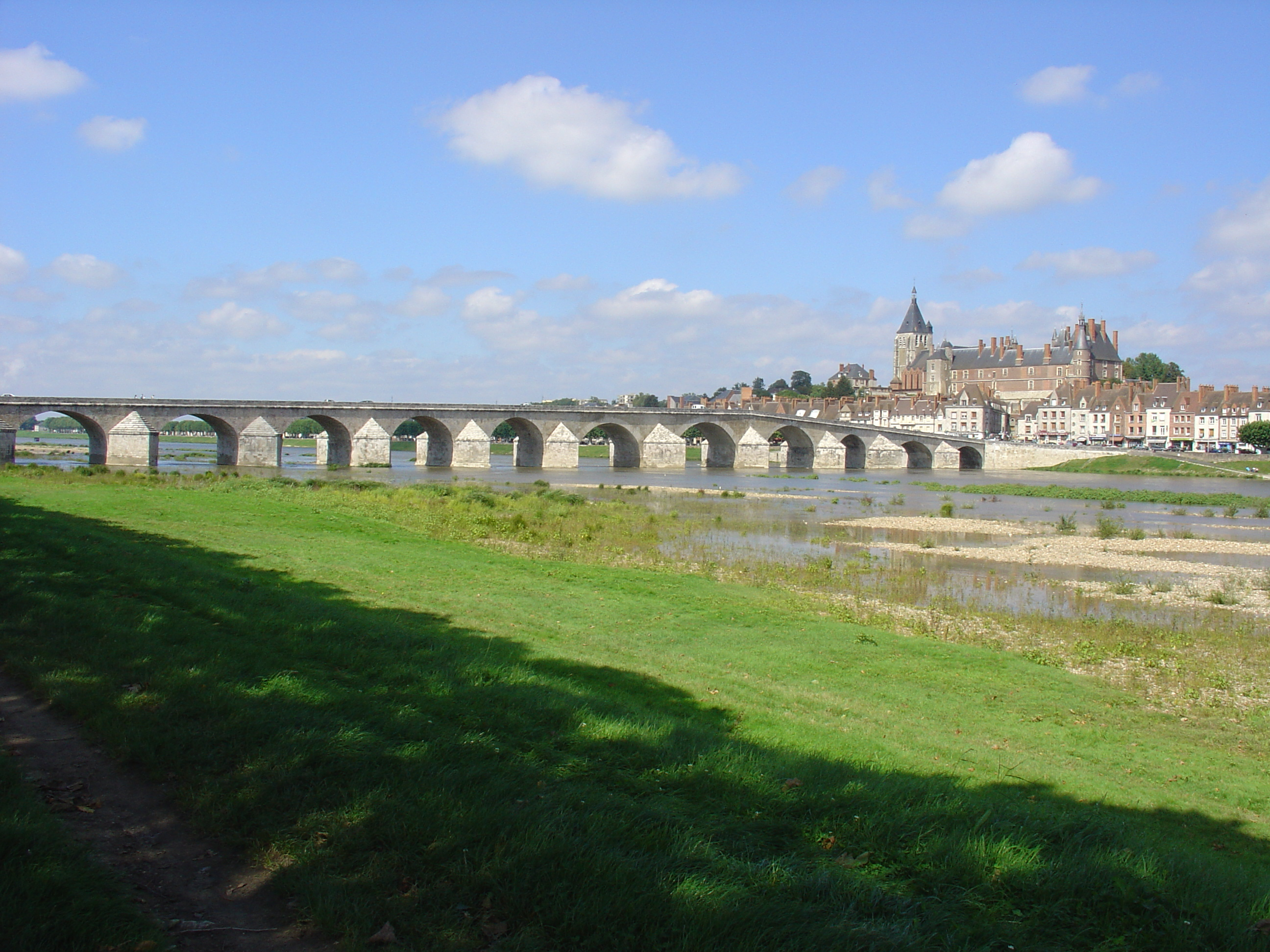
- The Loire in Gien

- Coat of arms
- Location of Gien
- Location within France Location within Centre-Val de Loire
- Coordinates: 47°41′23″N 2°37′48″E
- Country: France
- Region: Centre-Val de Loire
- Department: Loiret
- Arrondissement: Montargis
- Canton: Gien

Government
  - Mayor (2020–2026): Francis Cammal
- Area^{1}: 67.86 km^{2} (26.20 sq mi)
- Elevation: 161 m (528 ft)
- Highest elevation: 190 m (620 ft)
- Lowest elevation: 117 m (384 ft)
- Population (2023): 13,459
  - Density: 198.3/km^{2} (513.7/sq mi)
- Time zone: UTC+01:00 (CET)
  - Summer (DST): UTC+02:00 (CEST)
- INSEE/Postal code: 45155 /45500
- ^{1} French Land Register data, which excludes lakes, ponds, glaciers > 1 km^{2} (0.386 sq mi or 247 acres) and river estuaries.

Gien (French pronunciation: [ʒjɛ̃]) is a commune in the Loiret department in north-central France.

Gien is on the river Loire, 80 km (50 mi) from Orléans. Gien station has rail connections to Montargis, Nevers and Paris. The town was bought for the royal domain by Philip II of France. The town is twinned with Malmesbury in England.

== History ==
=== Prehistory ===
Evidence of prehistoric occupation of Gien has been discovered. Gien was probably a centre of trade between farmers and blacksmiths.

=== Antiquity ===
In Roman times, there was a town located in the site of Gien. However, its name remains unknown.

=== Middle Ages ===
The town of Gien-le-Vieux (Old Gien) became a parish in the high Middle Ages when Saint Peregrine, bishop of Auxerre, founded the Church of St. Peter and St. Paul. In 760, the army of Pepin the short stopped at Gien-le-Vieux before going to fight against Gascony and Aquitaine. In the eighth century, Charlemagne authorised the construction of a fortified mound around the site of the present castle.

In the ninth and tenth centuries the decline of the Carolingian empire and Viking Raids led to a gradual abandonment of Gien-le-Vieux. The population mostly moved to the site of the current town of Gien which was easier to defend. However, the church of St. Peter and St. Paul survived until the seventeenth century.

=== The French Wars of Religion ===
Gien had a large Protestant community and like its neighbours, Châtillon-Coligny, Châtillon-sur-Loire and Orleans, it was a Protestant stronghold during the French wars of religion. During this period, the churches were looted and clergy hunted.

=== Second World War ===
Much of Gien was destroyed during the Second World War. The town was bombed by the Luftwaffe, who aimed to destroy the town's bridge to prevent the French Army from retreating. The bombardment created a huge fire which completely destroyed over four hundred buildings, including the town's two main churches. The town was rebuilt after the war.

== Population ==
Historical population
Year	Pop.	±% p.a.
1968	12,264	—
1975	14,621	+2.54%
1982	16,064	+1.35%
1990	16,477	+0.32%
1999	15,332	−0.80%
2007	15,442	+0.09%
2012	14,519	−1.23%
2017	14,007	−0.72%
2023	13,459	−0.66%
Source: INSEE

== Sights ==
- Château de Gien, historic, listed castle.
- Faïencerie de Gien, founded in 1821.

== See also ==
- Communes of the Loiret department
