= Château de Boisgibault =

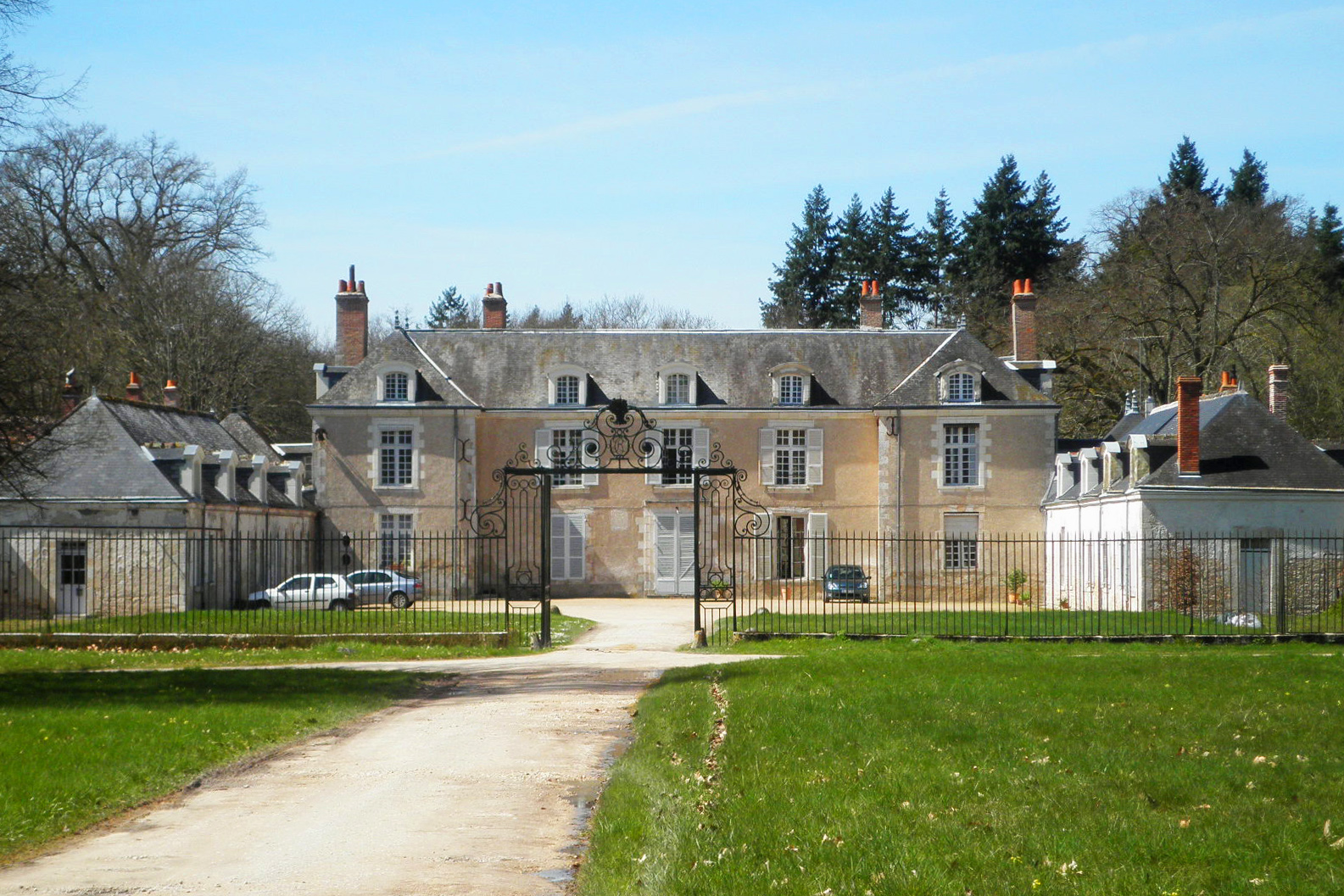
- Interactive map of Château de Boisgibault
- 47°0′47″N 1°0′51″E
- Type: Castle
- Location: Ardon, Loiret, France

History
- Built: 16th century

Site notes
- Owner: private

Monument historique
- Designated: 2001

The Château de Boisgibault is located 10 kilometers south of Orléans on D168 in the commune of Ardon in the Loiret département of France.

== History ==
The original manor, never fortified, was built in 1680. Its successive owners continued to enlarge the area to develop the castle. In 1712, Joseph Charpentier, Lord of Brandelong and Méliers, bought Boisgibault. The family obtained the right to have a chapel in Boisgibault in 1756. His son, Jacques Charpentier de Boisgibault (1721–1794), was Senior Judge and Président of the Court of Aids with Malesherbes and an advisor to King Louis XV, and later died in the French Revolution. The two wings of the castle have most likely been added in the 18th century. During the French Revolution, the castle and its backyard were sold. In 1829, the château was acquired by the Marquis de Gasville who made of Boisgibault one of the finest hunting properties in Sologne by extending the walls of the park by more than a kilometer fence. The woods were drilled in wide avenues. He built a square pavilion called the telegraph.

The château, oriented east–west, consists of an elongated building flanked by two wings. This set is characteristic of a residence of Sologne built for hunting, without much concern for an outdoor setting. It nevertheless has a sober and balanced plan whose single character has remained very authentic.

== Preservation as a monument ==
On December 31, 2001, the Château de Boisgibault was classified as a historic monument. It should not be confused with the village Boisgibault, in Tracy-sur-Loire, about 80 miles away. It has never belonged to the Family Boisgibault.

== See also ==
- Châteaux of the Loire Valley
- Gardens of the French Renaissance
- List of castles in France
