= Téoz =

French railways branded service

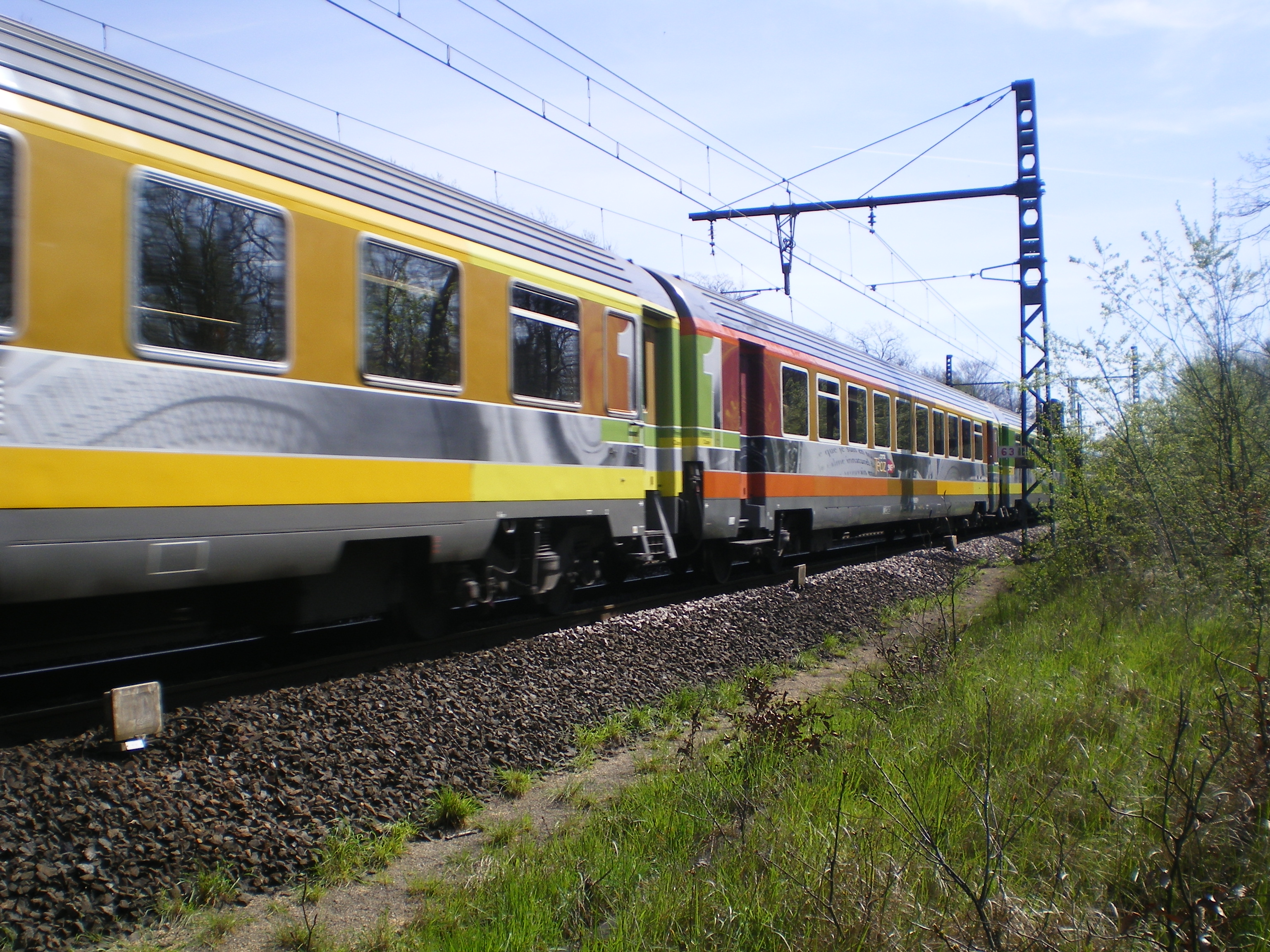
Téoz carriages near Thomery station in Seine-et-Marne in 2008

Téoz (formerly Corail Téoz) was a brand name used by France's national railway company, the SNCF, to denote long-distance reservation-obligatory passenger rail services on certain SNCF routes. The SNCF established the Téoz system in 2003 as an attempt to bring certain key routes up to the same standards as TGVs where high-speed lines are not available, leaving ordinary Corail trains to serve the rest of the non high-speed intercity and interregional network. It was merged into the Intercités brand in 2012.

== Service ==
Téoz services were not universally liked by the general public as they required compulsory reservation but went little faster (up to 200 km/h or 125 mph) than the traditional services they replaced. In January 2012, it was officially announced that the Teoz brand would abandoned; all SNCF long-distance non high-speed services have since been assimilated into the Intercités brand, along with the overnight sleeper trains which have also lost their previous branding (Lunéa).

There was an Éco train, which was running once a day on the line from the Gare d'Austerlitz in Paris to Toulouse. In second class, passengers could choose between reclining seats in an open carriage, or six-person couchette compartments with the couchettes folded to form benches. In first class, only couchettes were available. These were permanently in night position, so passengers in first class had to either travel lying down, or agree to share the lower couchettes, sitting without backrests or armrests.
