= Intercités =

French rail service brand

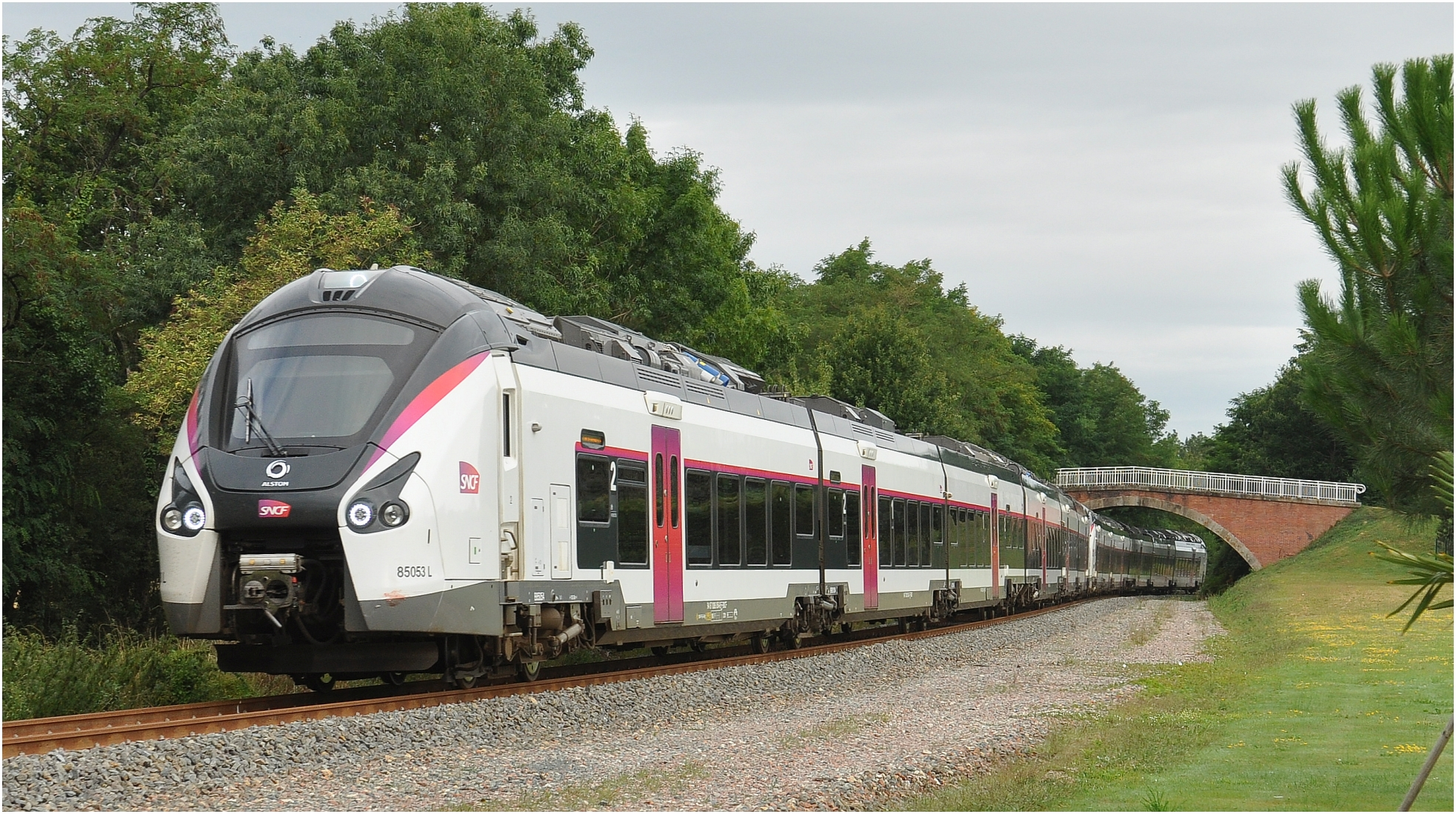
Intercités train on the Nantes to Bordeaux service in Vendée

Intercités (IC), known before September 2009 as Corail Intercités, is a brand name used by France's national railway company, the SNCF, to denote non high-speed intercity rail services on the classic rail network in France.

The SNCF established the Intercités brand in January 2006 to capture the remaining, mainly medium distance network of Corail trains, so called because they use the air-conditioned fleet of Corail coaches introduced by the SNCF from 1975. Intercités covers all the important SNCF routes not served by the TGV network.

Since December 2011, the former Téoz (long distance trains with obligatory reservation) and Intercités de nuit (overnight sleeper train) brands have been re-integrated and the Intercités brand now covers all non high-speed SNCF national network passenger services. In October 2012, the new social-democrat French Government announced increased funding for Intercités services, as part of a new transport strategy.

== Network ==
The Intercités network consists of the following lines as of January 2022:

=== Day trains ===
Route:	Stops:	Frequency:
Paris - Nevers	Paris-Bercy - Nemours-Saint-Pierre† - Montargis - Nogent-sur-Vernisson - Gien - Briare - Cosne-sur-Loire - Tracy-Sancerre† - La Charité - Pougues-les-Eaux - Fourchambault - Nevers	6x per day
Nantes - Lyon	Nantes - Angers-Saint-Laud - Saumur - Saint-Pierre-des-Corps - Vierzon-Ville - Bourges - Nevers - Moulins-sur-Allier - Saint-Germain-des-Fossés - Roanne - Lyon-Part-Dieu - Lyon-Perrache	3x per day
Nantes - Bordeaux	Nantes - La Roche-sur-Yon - Luçon - La Rochelle - Rochefort - Saintes - Jonzac - Bordeaux-Saint-Jean	4x per day
Hendaye - Toulouse	Hendaye - Saint-Jean-de-Luz-Ciboure - Biarritz - Bayonne - Orthez - Pau - Lourdes - Tarbes - Lannemezan† - Montréjeau-Gourdan-Polignan† - Saint-Gaudens† - Toulouse-Matabiau	3x per day Bayonne–Toulouse, 1x per day Hendaye–Toulouse
Paris - Clermont-Ferrand	Paris-Bercy - Nevers - Moulins-sur-Allier - Vichy - Riom-Châtel-Guyon - Clermont-Ferrand	8x per day
Paris - Limoges - Toulouse	Paris-Austerlitz - Les Aubrais† - Vierzon-Ville† - Issoudun† - Châteauroux - Argenton-sur-Creuse† - La Souterraine† - Limoges - Uzerche† - Brive-la-Gaillarde - Souillac† - Gourdon† - Cahors - Caussade† - Montauban - Toulouse-Matabiau	3x per day Paris–Limoges, 5x per day Paris–Brive, 3x per day Paris–Toulouse
Bordeaux - Marseille	Bordeaux-Saint-Jean - Marmande - Agen - Montauban - Toulouse-Matabiau - Carcassonne - Narbonne - Béziers - Sète - Montpellier-Saint-Roch - Nîmes - Arles - Marseille-Saint-Charles	6x per day Bordeaux–Marseille, 1x per day Bordeaux–Nîmes, 1x per day Toulouse-Marseille
Clermont-Ferrand - Béziers	Clermont-Ferrand ... Neussargues - Saint-Flour - Saint-Chély-d'Apcher ... Marvejols ... Millau ... Béziers	1x per day
† Not all trains call at this station

=== Night trains ===
As of January 2022, the Intercités de Nuit network consists of the following lines:

- Paris - Gap - Briançon
- Paris - Marseille - Nice
- Paris - Rodez - Albi
- Paris - Pamiers - Latour-de-Carol
- Paris - Narbonne - Portbou
- Paris - Tarbes - Hendaye
- Paris - Toulouse

== See also ==
- Rail transport in France
- Train categories in Europe
