= Cosne-sur-Loire station =

Railway station in Bourgogne-Franche-Comté, France

Cosne-sur-Loire
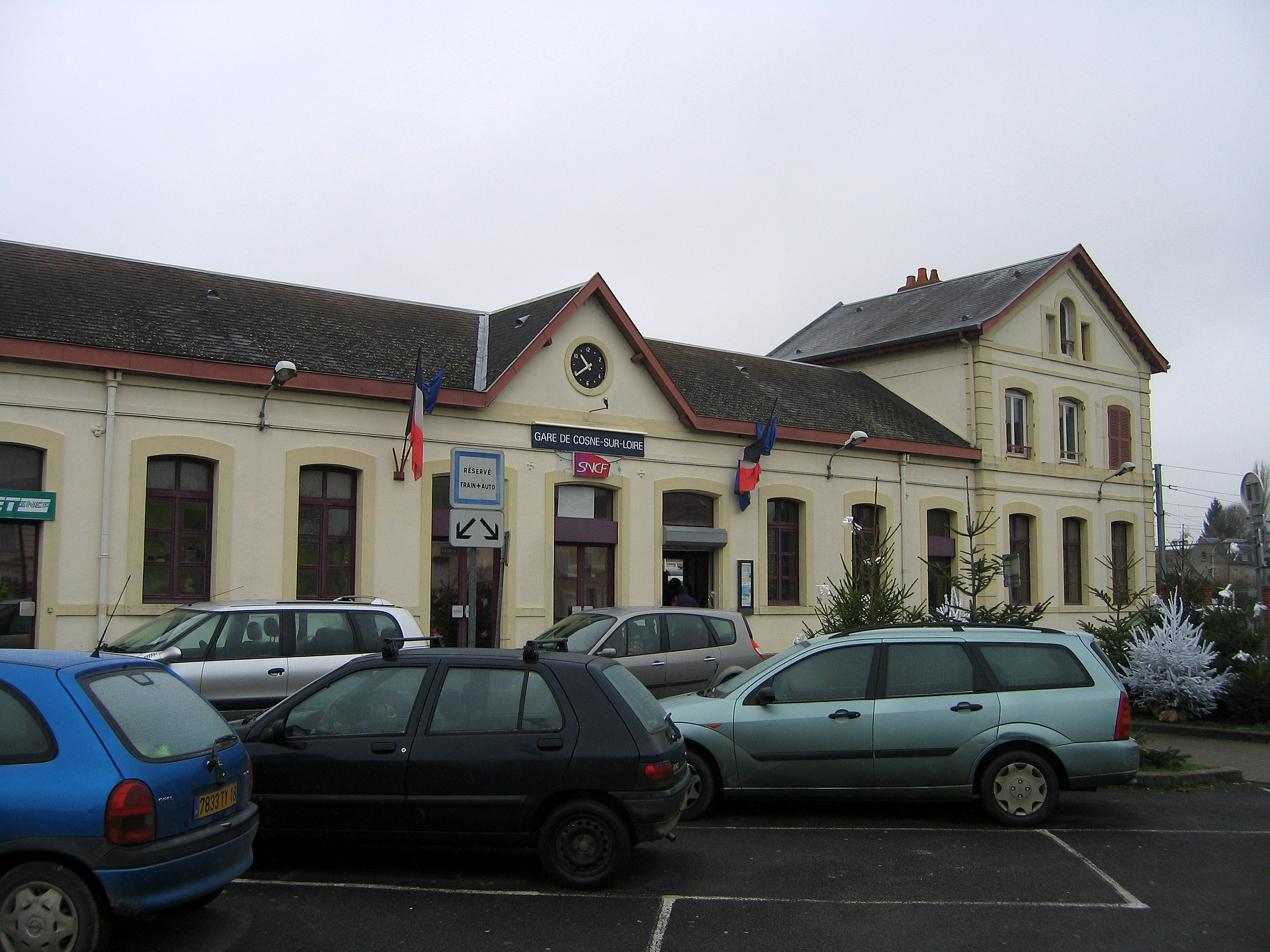
- Cosne-sur-Loire station

General information
- Location: Cosne-Cours-sur-Loire, Nièvre, Bourgogne-Franche-Comté; France
- Coordinates: 47°24′50″N 2°55′56″E
- Line: Moret-Lyon railway
- Platforms: 3
- Tracks: 3

Other information
- Station code: 87696146

Services
Preceding station	SNCF	Following station
Briare towards Paris-Bercy	Intercités	Tracy-Sancerre towards Nevers
Preceding station	TER Bourgogne-Franche-Comté	Following station
Terminus	TER	Tracy-Sancerre towards Nevers-le-Banlay
Location

Cosne-sur-Loire station is the railway station in Cosne-Cours-sur-Loire, Bourgogne-Franche-Comté, France. The station is located on the Moret-Lyon railway. The station is served by Intercités (long distance) and TER (local) services operated by SNCF.

== Train services ==
The station is served by intercity and regional trains towards Montargis, Nevers and Paris.

== Gallery ==
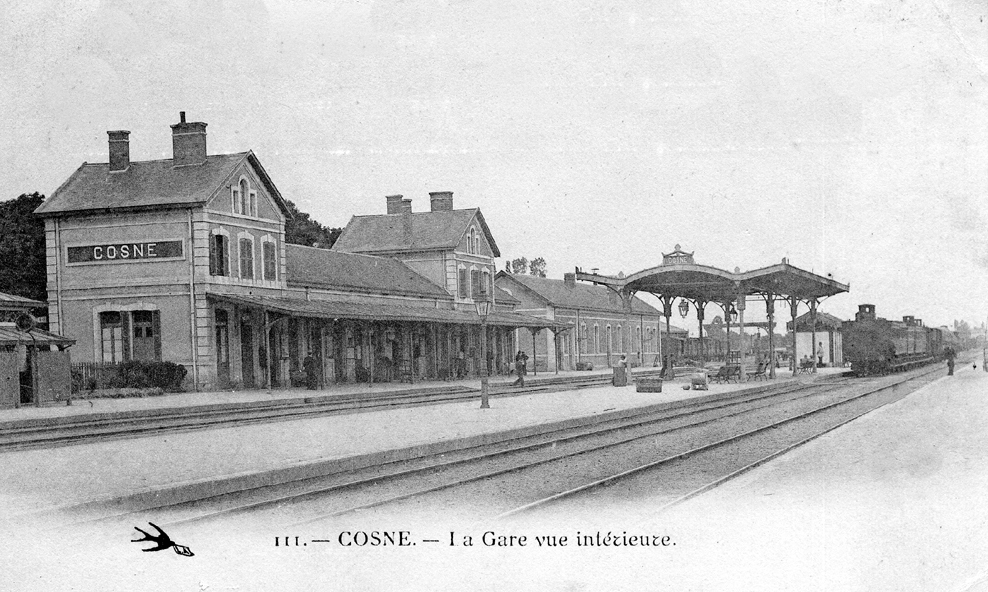
An old image of the railway station

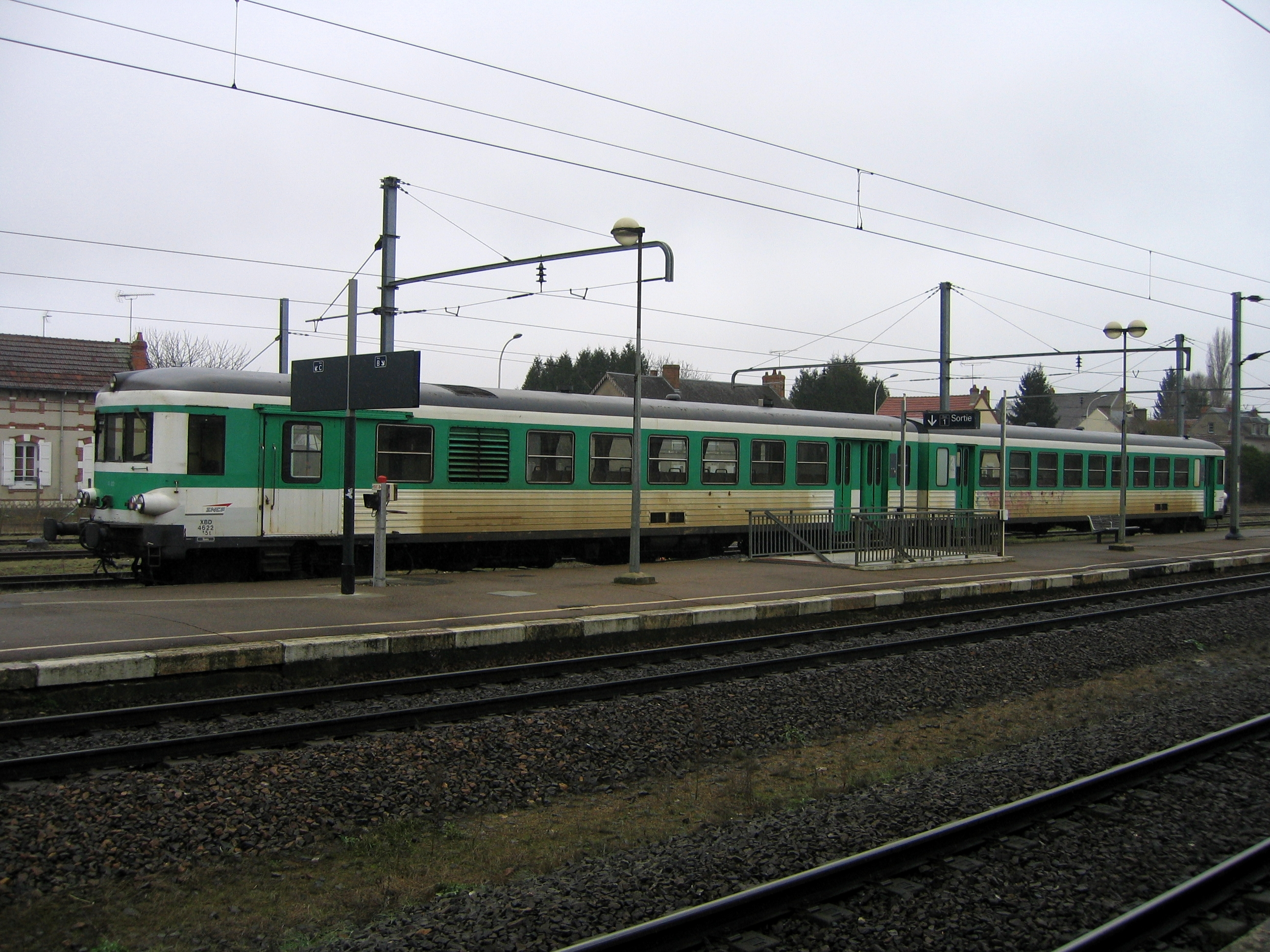
An X4500 train at the station in 2009

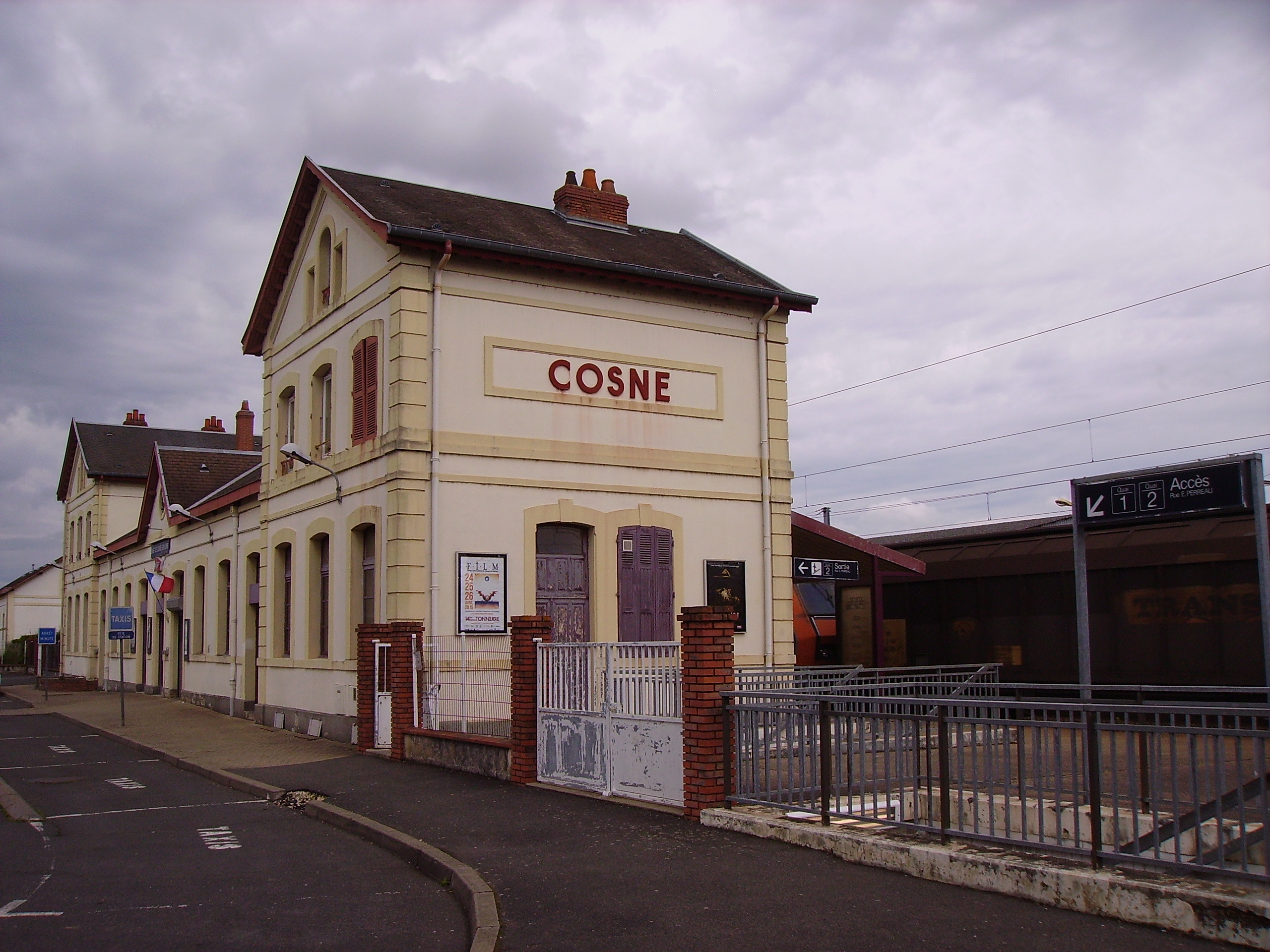
A freight train at the station in 2015
