= Moret–Lyon railway =

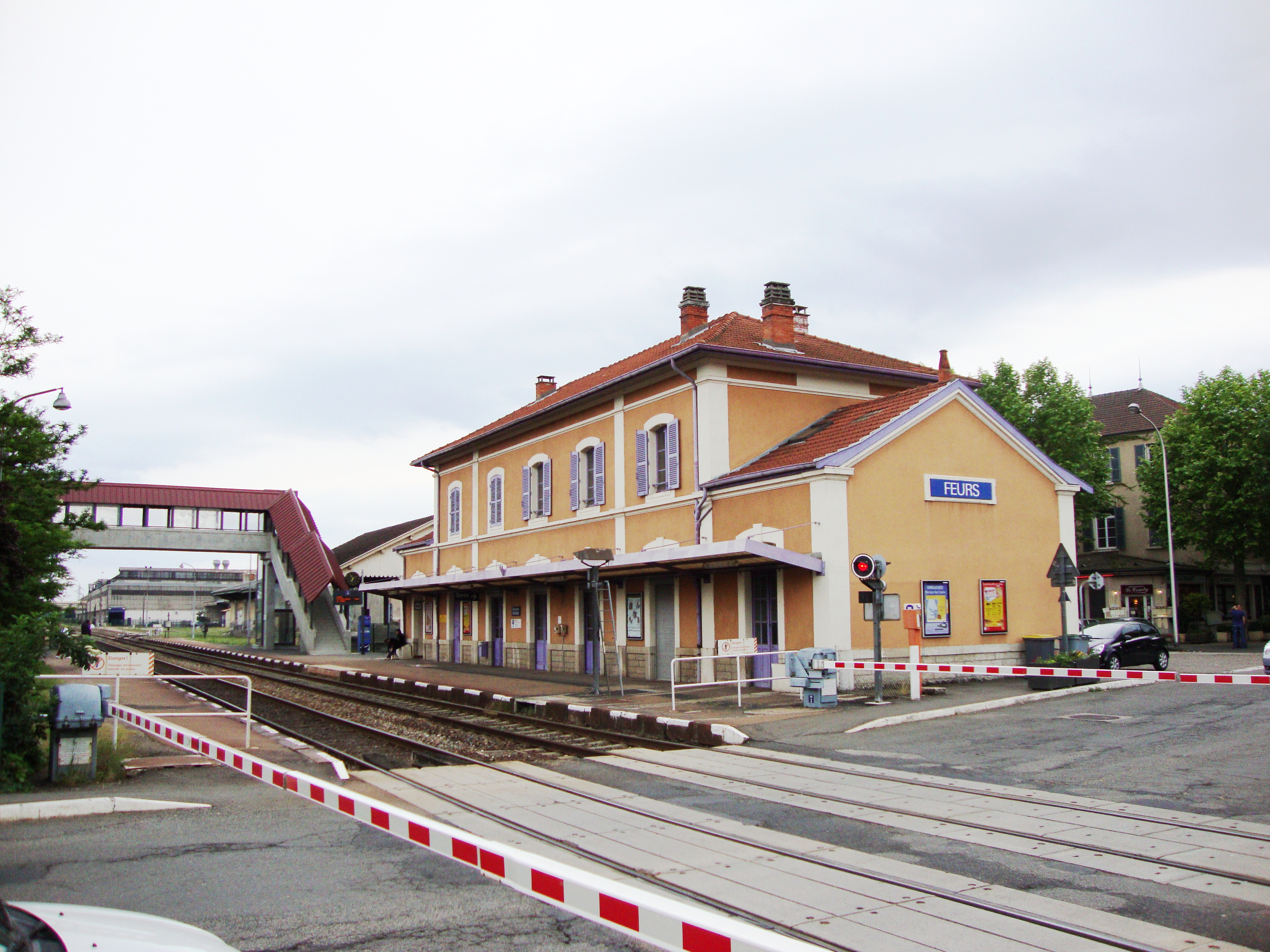
- Feurs railway station

Overview
- Status: Operational
- Owner: RFF
- Locale: France (Île-de-France, Centre-Val de Loire; Bourgogne-Franche-Comté, Auvergne-Rhône-Alpes)
- Termini: Moret–Veneux-les-Sablons station; Lyon-Perrache station
- Stations: 61

Service
- System: SNCF
- Operator(s): SNCF

History
- Opened: 1828-1861

Technical
- Line length: 492 km (306 mi)
- Number of tracks: Double track
- Track gauge: 1,435 mm (4 ft 8 1/2 in) standard gauge
- Electrification: 1.5 kV DC Moret–Montargis, St-Étienne–Lyon; 25 kV 50 Hz Montargis–St-Germain-d-F; St-Germain-d-F–St-Étienne not electrified

The railway from Moret-Veneux-les-Sablons to Lyon is a French 492-kilometre long railway line, that connects the Paris region to the city Lyon via Nevers and Saint-Étienne. The railway was opened in several stages between 1828 and 1861. The section between Saint-Étienne and Saint-Just-sur-Loire was the first railway line in France. It has functioned as an alternative (but longer) line for the Paris–Marseille railway between Paris and Lyon. Its main use, besides local traffic, is now for the connection between Paris and Clermont-Ferrand.

== Route ==
The line branches off the Paris–Marseille railway at the Moret–Veneux-les-Sablons station, and leaves in a southwestern direction. It follows the river Loing upstream, turning south near Nemours and passing through Montargis, where it leaves the Loing. At Gien it starts following the river Loire upstream along its right bank, in a generally southern direction. It passes through Cosne-sur-Loire, and the railway junction Nevers, where it crosses the Loire. At Saincaize the line to Bourges branches off.

From Saincaize, the line follows the right Allier bank south. It passes through Moulins. At Saint-Germain-des-Fossés two lines to Clermont-Ferrand (one via Gannat, one via Vichy) branch off. The Moret–Lyon railway leaves the Allier and turns east. It passes through the Monts de la Madeleine, northern foothills of the Massif Central. It crosses the Loire between Roanne and Le Coteau, where the shorter line to Lyon via Tarare branches off.

This is where the oldest section of the line starts. It continues south, parallel to the Loire, passing through Feurs and along Andrézieux-Bouthéon, where it meets the line from Clermont-Ferrand via Montbrison. At Saint-Étienne the line from Le Puy-en-Velay joins, and the line continues northeast through Saint-Chamond and Rive-de-Gier. At Givors on the river Rhône it turns north, finally arriving in Lyon after 492 km.

=== Main stations ===
The main stations on the Moret–Lyon railway are:

- Moret–Veneux-les-Sablons station
- Nevers station
- Roanne station
- Saint-Étienne-Châteaucreux station
- Lyon-Perrache station

== History ==
The first railways that were opened in France were primarily meant for freight traffic in the mining area around the industrial city Saint-Étienne. These railways were united in the Compagnie du chemin de fer Grand-Central de France in 1853, and at the dissolution of that company in 1857 the eastern part of the Grand-Central network was bought by the Chemins de fer de Paris à Lyon et à la Méditerranée.

The first section of the Moret–Lyon railway that was opened in 1828 led from Saint-Étienne to Saint-Just-sur-Loire. Saint-Étienne and Lyon were connected between 1830 and 1833. In 1834 the line was extended in northern direction from Saint-Just to Le Coteau, near Roanne. In 1850 a line from Nevers to Saincaize was built. This section was extended south to Varennes-sur-Allier in 1853, to Saint-Germain-des-Fossés in 1854 and to Lapalisse in 1857. Lapalisse and Le Coteau were connected in 1858. In the north, Moret–Veneux-les-Sablons on the Paris–Marseille railway was connected to Montargis in 1860. Finally in 1861 the section from Montargis to Nevers was opened.

== Services ==
The Moret–Lyon railway is used by the following passenger services:

- TGV on the section between Saint-Étienne and Lyon
- Intercités from Paris to Nevers (on the section between Moret–Veneux-les-Sablons and Nevers), from Bordeaux to Lyon (section between Saint-Germain-des-Fossés and Le Coteau), from Nantes to Lyon (section between Saincaize and Le Coteau) and from Paris to Clermont-Ferrand (on the section between Moret-Veneux-les-Sablons and Saint-Germain-des-Fossés)
- TER Bourgogne-Franche-Comté and TER Auvergne-Rhône-Alpes regional services on the section between Cosne-sur-Loire and Lyon
- Transilien regional services on the section between Moret–Veneux-les-Sablons and Montargis
