= Canton of Nevers =

Canton of Nevers may refer to:

- Canton of Nevers-1, Nièvre, Bourgogne-Franche-Comté, France
- Canton of Nevers-2, Nièvre, Bourgogne-Franche-Comté, France
- Canton of Nevers-3, Nièvre, Bourgogne-Franche-Comté, France
- Canton of Nevers-4, Nièvre, Bourgogne-Franche-Comté, France

== See also ==
- Arrondissement of Nevers, Nièvre, Bourgogne-Franche-Comté, France
- Prefecture of Nevers, Nièvre, Bourgogne-Franche-Comté, France
- County of Nevers, Burgundy
- Duchy of Nevers, France
- Nevers (disambiguation)
