= Murder of Lina Delsarte =

2023 murder case in France

Lina Delsarte
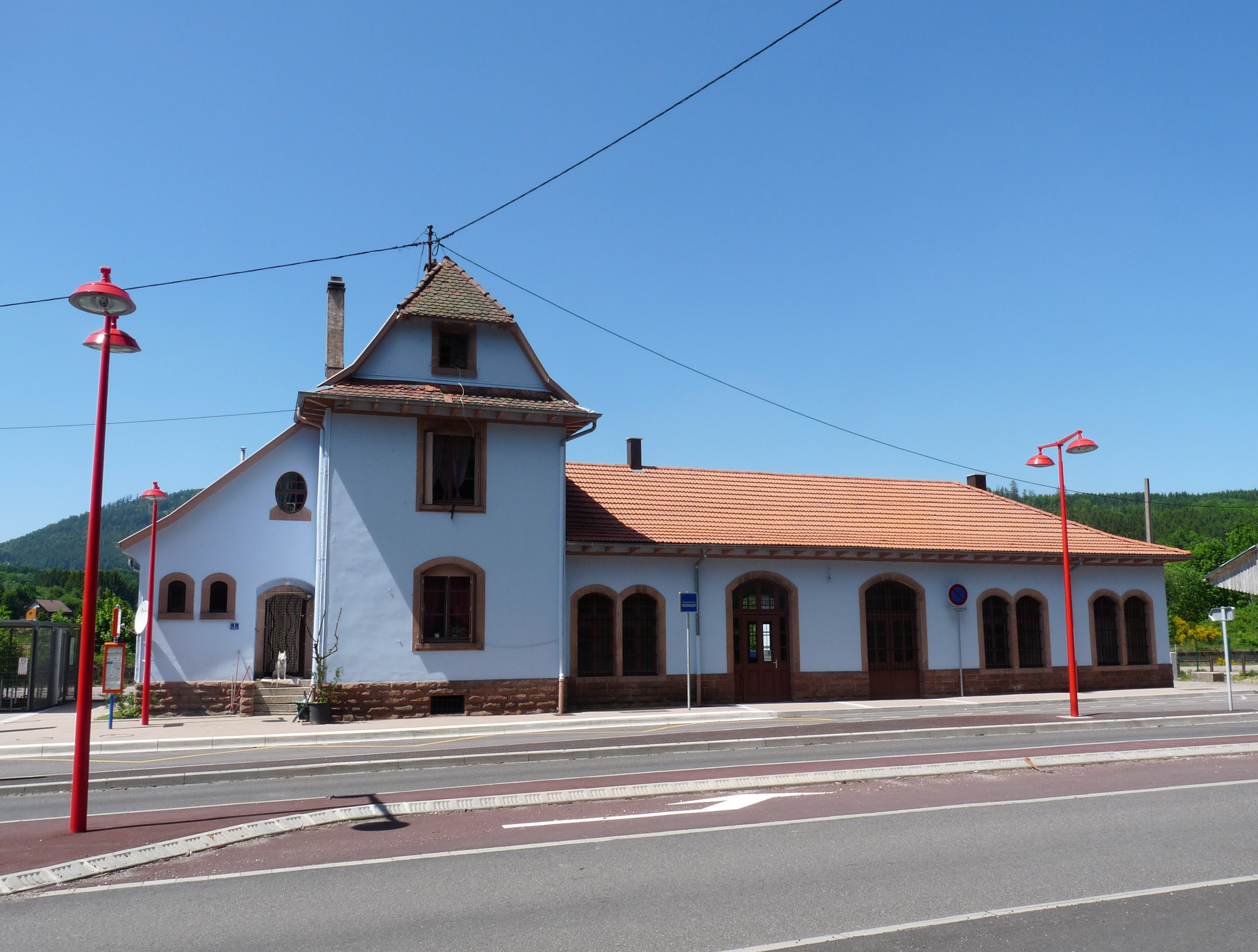
- Saint-Blaise-la-Roche - Poutay station (pictured in 2010) where Lina Delsarte was walking to when she disappeared
- Born: Lina Delsarte; 10 August 2008; Bas-Rhin
- Disappeared: 23 September 2023 (aged 15); Saint-Blaise-la-Roche
- Body discovered: Sermoise-sur-Loire; 16 October 2024
- Education: Frison-Roche College

Lina Delsarte was a 15-year-old French girl who disappeared on September 23, 2023, while walking to a train station in Saint-Blaise-la-Roche, France.

Samuel Gonin (42) was identified as the prime suspect after several months. He had a history of attacks against women and died by suicide in July 2024 after police seized his car, but before he could be questioned. Delsarte's bag was found in the car, as were traces of her DNA. Her remains were located on October 16, 2024 near Nevers, some 500 km away. Police accessing GPS data from Gonin's car helped locate the girl's body.

== Victim ==
Lina Delsarte, was born on 10 August 2008. She was therefore fifteen years old when she disappeared.

She was described as being of French nationality, 1.60m tall, and having blonde hair and light green eyes.

The month of her disappearance, she was preparing a professional aptitude certificate (CAP) for "personal assistance" in an establishment near Saint-Blaise-la-Roche in the department of Bas-Rhin, after obtaining her national brevet diploma in July 2023 at the Frison-Roche college.

She was the only daughter of parents Olivier Delsarte and Fanny Groll who separated in 2011.

== Disappearance ==
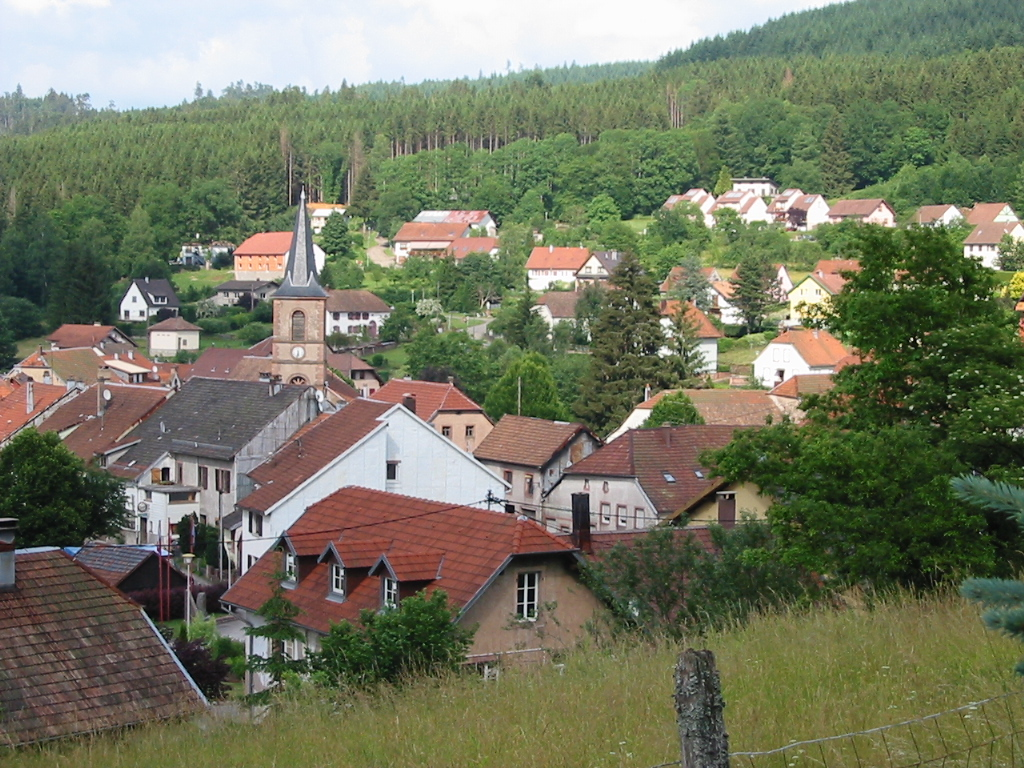
View of Saint-Blaise-la-Roche.

On Saturday 23 September 2023, Lina Delsarte left her home in Champenay (a hamlet in the commune of Plaine) to go to the Saint-Blaise-la-Roche - Poutay train station, where she was due to take a train to Strasbourg to meet her boyfriend. She made the journey of approximately 3km on foot. Two witnesses saw her between 11:15 and 11:30 a.m. and then her mobile phone made a final signal at 11:22a.m. Recordings from the station's surveillance cameras indicated that she did not board the train. When she did not arrive, her boyfriend alerted the girl's mother. At the time of her disappearance, Lina was wearing a grey dress, a white jacket, and white Converse shoes. According to the public prosecutor Public Prosecutor of Saverne, Aline Clérot, the victim did not have the profile of a runaway and the family had "no particular problems." No banking activity was noted on her account after the disappearance.

== Miscellaneous news in parallel ==
On 1 October 2023, eight days after the teenager's disappearance, Lina Delsarte's first serious boyfriend, 22-year-old Benjamin Holtzmann, was killed in a road incident. After being clocked at 185 km/h by the police on the D500, near Obernai (Bas-Rhin), Holtzmann was said to have accelerated and missed the exit ramp where the car left the road. He was pronounced dead when help arrived.

Their relationship reportedly lasted about a year in 2022 and they remained on good terms afterward. According to the National Gendarmerie, it was not a suicide but an accident. Despite the coincidence, his death was in no way linked to the investigation.

== Previous complaint of rape ==
In June 2022, Lina Delsarte, then aged 13, had filed a complaint for gang rape, which was dismissed as an “insufficiently characterized” offense. In January 2024, the Saverne public prosecutor's office announced that it was carrying out a "new legal study of the procedure" and was handing over the case to the Strasbourg public prosecutor's office, which opened in February. A judicial investigation for "rape committed on a minor under 15 by an adult with an age difference of at least five years", a procedure which was "unrelated and separate from that subsequently opened for new charges of kidnapping and criminal sequestration" following the disappearance.

== Investigation ==
The searches took place mainly between the victim's home, located in Champenay, and the Saint-Blaise-la-Roche - Poutay train station, where she was due to take a train.

A search notice was issued by the gendarmerie on Saturday afternoon and an investigation into a "disturbing disappearance" was opened. A first search took place on Monday and a second the following day, supplemented by telephone investigations. Dog teams were then deployed to the potential location of the disappearance. A helicopter and drones also flew over the area. Two bodies of water located near Saint-Blaise-la-Roche were sounded by seven divers.

No trace suggesting any accident was discovered along the victim's route. Two sweeps involving 80 police officers were carried out on Thursday, September 28.

As part of the normal investigation, her boyfriend's phone was analysed by the police, in particular to study the last video she allegedly sent before her disappearance. The 19-year-old man revealed to the Nouveau Détective that he was the victim of threats and accusations after Lina's disappearance.

On 26 March 2024, six months after the disappearance of the teenager, three people, a man and a couple, were taken into custody by the police from the Strasbourg research section. The reason was inconsistencies between their timetables and the statements they made to investigators, but these interviews revealed nothing incriminating.

=== Traces discovered and a suspect identified ===
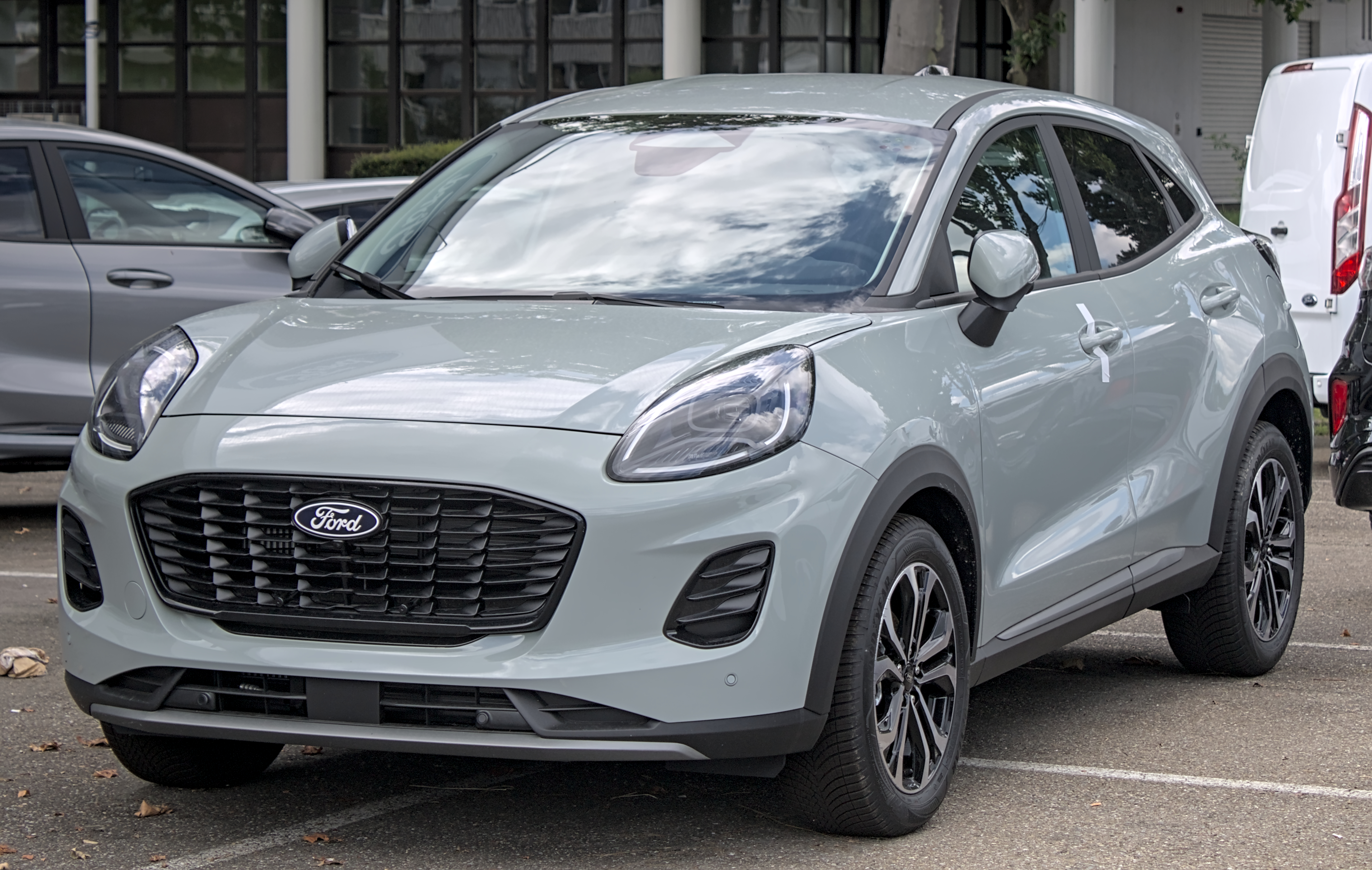
A grey 2024 Ford Puma similar to the car identified by investigators.

On 26 July 2024, the public prosecutor of Strasbourg announced that the genetic fingerprint (DNA) of the missing teenager had been identified in a Ford Puma. It was found on the seat belt in the right rear seat, and the girl's handbag was in the glove compartment.

The vehicle, registered in Germany, was stolen and had been damaged in January 2024 in the Aude department and impounded. It had been geolocated near the scene of Lina's disappearance on 23 September 2023.

The driver at the time of the accident, Samuel G., was trying to escape a customs check. He was arrested and sentenced to 15 months in prison suspended, without any link being established with Lina's disappearance. He had been identified as driving the same car at a gas station in Doubs two days before the disappearance of Lina Delsarte in Saint-Blaise-la-Roche

The 43-year-old suspect was due to appear in court in July 2024 for violent robberies, but committed suicide by hanging on 10 July 2024 in Besançon. This was before the link was established with the disappearance of Lina, at which point he immediately became the prime suspect.

=== Excavations ===
On 30 July 2024, searches were carried out in vain in the valley of Bruche and in the Vosges (in the places appearing in the GPS history of the suspect's vehicle), while the press revealed the name of the driver of the vehicle in which Lina's genetic profile had been found: Samuel Gonin, a 43-year-old from Besançon, former carpentry teacher at the Saint-Joseph vocational high school, who had already attacked two women in the past and who killed himself on 10 July 2024.

On Saturday 3 August 2024, the gendarmerie ended its search in the Anould forest in the Vosges after finding no additional elements allowing the investigation to progress.

On Tuesday 6 August 2024, the searches resumed in the Saulx woods, 14 kilometers from Vesoul (the Haute-Saône prefecture), following the GPS data from Gonin's car. For three days, ninety gendarmes combed through the forest, using ground-penetrating radar often used by archaeologists to detect anomalies in the ground.

In September 2024, the interim public prosecutor of Strasbourg revealed that Lina's DNA and that of Samuel Gonin were found on ropes in the trunk of the car, which proved that she had been "tied up.«

=== Discovery of a body ===
On 16 October 2024, Lina's body was finally found in a wooded and isolated area in Sermoise-sur-Loire, in Nièvre. It was fully submerged in a body of water.

This was nearly 500 km (310 mi) from where she was last seen. The car of the main suspect had been geolocated at this location on 24 September 2023, the day after the disappearance. Lina's funeral took place on Friday, 25 October 2024 at 2 p.m. in the Saint-Arnould church in Plaine.

On 19 December 2024, the public prosecutor announced the cause of death could not be formally established, but investigators thought strangulation was most likely. However, police were not able to speak conclusively due to decomposition of the remains and exposure to the elements. Finally authorities concluded: "to date, all the elements point to a solitary action on the part of Samuel Gonin."

== See also ==
- List of solved missing person cases (2020s)
