= Nevers (disambiguation) =

Nevers may refer to:

== Places ==
- Nevers, Nevers, Nièvre, Bourgogne-Franche-Comté, France; a prefecture
- Arrondissement of Nevers, Nièvre, Bourgogne-Franche-Comté, France; a borough (arrondissement)
- Canton of Nevers (disambiguation), Nièvre, Bourgogne-Franche-Comté, France; several cantons
- Roman Catholic Diocese of Nevers, Burgundy, France
- Duchy of Nevers, a duchy of France
- County of Nevers, a county of Burgundy
- Tom Nevers, Nantucket, Massachusetts, USA; a headland on Nantucket island named after the Native American

=== Facilities and structures ===
- Tom Nevers Naval Facility, Nantucket, Massachusetts, USA; a U.S. Navy facility
- Nevers Cathedral, Nevers, Nievre, France; a Roman Catholic cathedral
- Nevers station, Nevers, Nievre, France; a train station
- Palais ducal de Nevers (Nevers Palace), Nevers, Nievre, France
- Hôtel de Nevers (disambiguation) (Nevers Hotel)
- Nevers Dam (1889–1955), St. Croix River, Minnesota, USA; a removed dam

== People ==
- Duke of Nevers
  - Duchesses of Nevers, consorts of the Dukes
- Count of Nevers
  - Countess of Nevers, consorts to the Counts
- Ernie Nevers (1902–1976), a US American football and baseball player and coach
- Thomas Nevers (born 1956), a US soccer player
- Tom Nevers, Nantucket (born 1640), a Native American from Nantucket whose name is given to the district
- Nevers Mumba (born 1960), a Zambian politician

=== Fictional characters ===
- Queen of Nevers, a Marvel Comics fictional character

== Other uses ==
- The Nevers (TV series), a 2021 science fiction period European drama from HBO
- USO Nevers (aka "Nevers"), Nevers, Nievre, France; a French rugby union team
- FC Nevers 58 (aka "Nevers"), Nevers, Nievre, France; a French soccer team

== See also ==
- Tom Nevers (disambiguation)
- Never (disambiguation)
