= Bruno Martini =

French footballer (1962–2020)

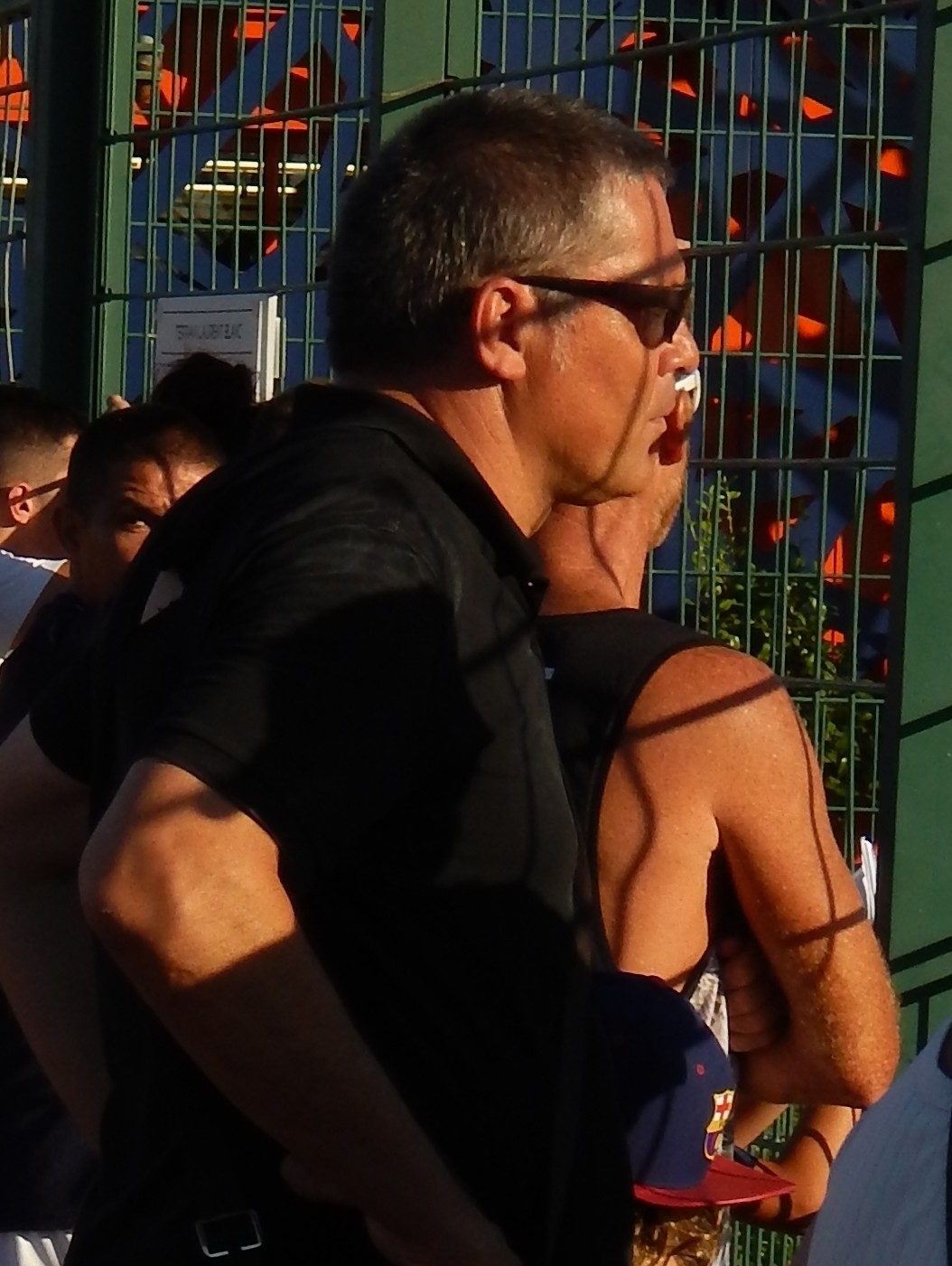
- Martini watching Montpellier in training in 2015

Personal information
- Full name: Bruno Ludovic Jean Roger Martini
- Date of birth: 25 January 1962
- Place of birth: Challuy, France
- Date of death: 20 October 2020 (aged 58)
- Place of death: Montpellier, France
- Height: 1.82 m (6 ft 0 in)
- Position: Goalkeeper

Youth career
- 1972–1979: ASAV
- 1979–1981: JGA Nevers

Senior career*
Years	Team	Apps	(Gls)
1981–1995	Auxerre	322	(0)
1983–1985	→ Nancy (loan)	65	(0)
1995–1999	Montpellier	105	(0)
Total		492	(0)

International career
- France U21
1987–1996	France	31	(0)
- * Club domestic league appearances and goals

Bruno Ludovic Jean Roger Martini (25 January 1962 – 20 October 2020) was a French professional footballer who played as a goalkeeper.

His professional career was closely associated with Auxerre, for which he played for 13 years. Having won more than 30 caps for France during nine years, Martini represented the nation in two UEFA European Championships.

== Club career ==
Born in Challuy, Nevers, Martini started playing professionally for AJ Auxerre. After a loan stint with AS Nancy he took the place of Paris Saint-Germain FC-bound Joël Bats, going on to appear in 322 Ligue 1 matches while also helping his team to a 1992–93 semi-final run in the UEFA Cup.

Martini left the club in the season prior to the 1995–96 conquest of the double, pushed to the sidelines by Lionel Charbonnier. He finished his career in 1999 at 37 after four seasons with Montpellier HSC, and returned to the latter side in 2015 as a goalkeeper coach.

== International career ==
Martini played 31 times for France and played at Euro 1992 (as a starter) and Euro 1996. Immediately after his retirement, he started serving as goalkeeping coach for Les Bleus.

For his performance in the final of the 1988 UEFA European Under-21 Championship against Greece, Martini was awarded a 10/10 rating by newspaper L'Équipe, becoming the first player to receive this rating.

== Death ==
Martini died on 20 October 2020 of heart failure in Montpellier, aged 58.

== Honours ==
France U21

- UEFA European Under-21 Championship: 1988
