= Hôtel de Ville, Nevers =

Town hall in Nevers, France

Hôtel de Ville
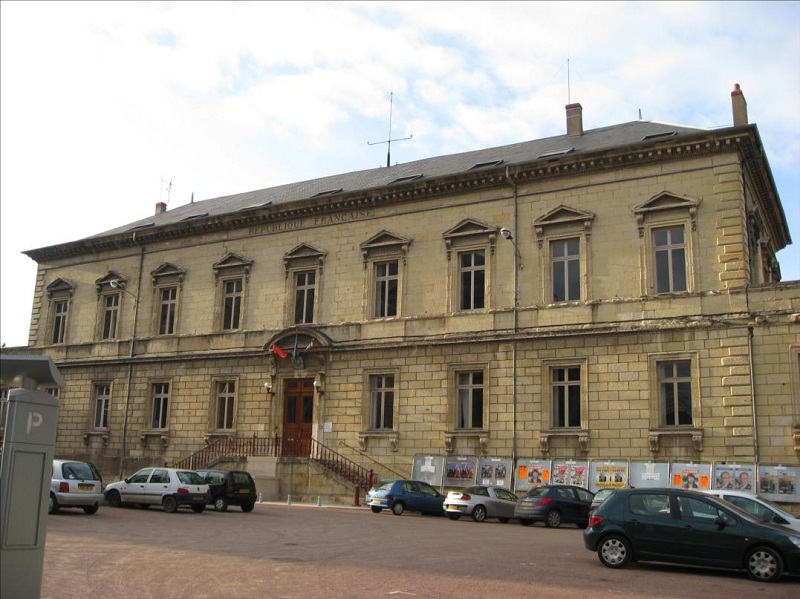
- The main frontage of the Hôtel de Ville in February 2012

General information
- Type: City hall
- Architectural style: Neoclassical style
- Location: Nevers, France
- Coordinates: 46.9879°N 3.1576°E
- Completed: 1834

Design and construction
- Architect: Pierre Paillard

Monument historique
- Official name: Hôtel de ville
- Type: Inscrit
- Designated: 1993
- Reference no.: PA00125321

The Hôtel de Ville (French pronunciation: [otɛl də vil], City Hall) is a municipal building in Nevers, Nièvre, in central France, standing on Place de l'Hôtel de Ville. It was designated a monument historique by the French government in 1993.

== History ==
Following the French Revolution, the town council initially met in the Ducal Palace which dates from the 15th century. The council established an office there in 1793 and purchased it from the heirs of Louis Jules Mancini, Duke of Nevers in 1810. In the mid-1820s, the council decided to commission a new building which was originally intended to accommodate the library and the courts. The site they selected, to the southwest of the Ducal Palace, was occupied by the ruins of an old castle which dated from the 13th century. Construction work commenced with the clearance of these ruins in 1827. The new building was designed by the municipal architect, Pierre Paillard, in the neoclassical style, built in ashlar stone and was completed in 1834. The building was expanded at both ends to serve as the town hall in the mid-19th century and a fine reception room, which later became the registry office, was added in 1899.

The design involved a symmetrical main frontage of 11 bays facing onto Place de l'Hôtel de Ville. The layout consisted of a two-storey main block of nine bays, together with a pair of single-storey end bays, all on a large base. The central bay featured a small forestair leading up to a doorway with a moulded surround and a curved pediment on the ground floor. The other bays on the ground floor were fenestrated by cross-windows with window sills supported by brackets, while the bays on the first floor were fenestrated by cross-windows with moulded surrounds and triangular pediments.

During the German occupation of France in the Second World War, the town hall was decorated with Nazi emblems. After the German forces abandoned the town on 6 September 1944, the French Resistance removed the Nazi emblems, burnt a portrait of Adolf Hitler and restored the statue of Marianne.

In the 1980s, the Ducal Palace was restored to serve as an annexe to the town hall, and a council chamber, named after a former mayor, Pierre Bérégovoy, was created on the top floor of the palace. A major programme of refurbishment works, involving restoration of the façade and replacement of the windows of the town hall, was carried out at a cost of €1.3 million between January and May 2019.
