= Nevera =

Nevera may refer to:

- Rimac Nevera, an all-electric battery powered hypercar from Rimac Automobili
- Nevera (album), a 2000 pop-rock album by All Stars Osvajači
- La Nevera (lake), The Three Eyes National Park, Santo Domingo Este, Dominican Republic
- The Neveras, two ruined Moorish domes in La Vall d'Alcalà, Marina Alta, Alicante, Valencia, Spain
- The Neveras, archaeological domes in Fuendetodos, Campo de Belchite, Aragon, Spain

== See also ==
- Never (disambiguation)
- Nevada (disambiguation)
