= Hôtel de Nevers =

Hôtel de Nevers may refer to:

- Hôtel de Nevers (left bank), Quai de Nevers, 6th arrondissement, Paris, Ile-de-France, France
- Hôtel de Nevers (rue de Richelieu), right bank, 2nd arrondissement, Paris, Ile-de-France, France

== See also ==
- Palais ducal de Nevers, Nevers, Nièvre, Bourgogne-Franche-Comté, France
- Nevers (disambiguation)
- Hotel (disambiguation)
