= Delsarte =

Delsarte may refer to

- François Delsarte, French musician, founder of the Delsarte System
- Jean Delsarte, French mathematician
- Lina Delsarte, French murder victim
- Philippe Delsarte, Belgian mathematician and coding theorist
