= Saint-Blaise-la-Roche - Poutay station =

Railway station in Saint-Blaise-la-Roche, France

Saint-Blaise-la-Roche–Poutay
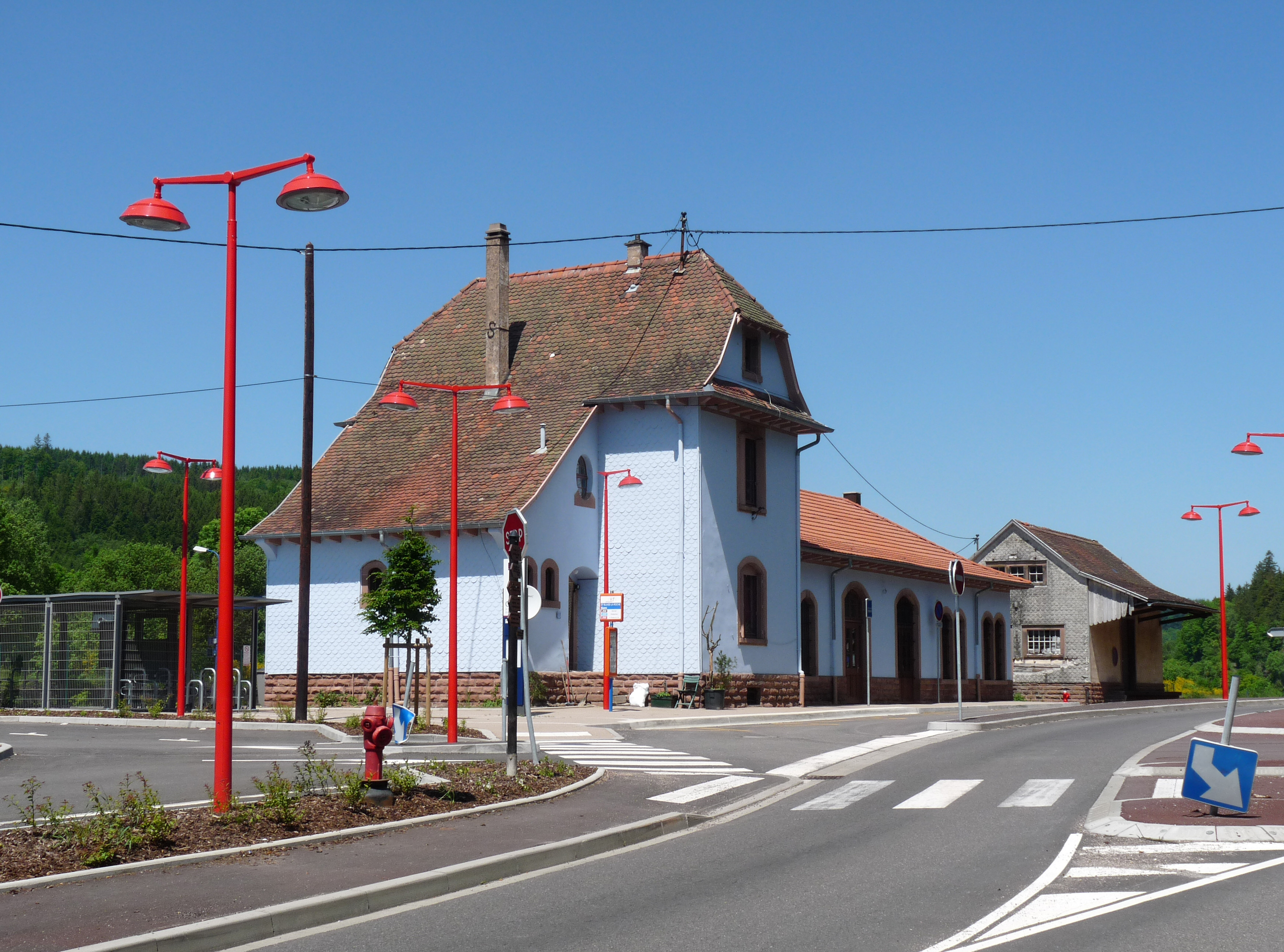

General information
- Location: Main Street, 67420 Saint-Blaise-la-Roche; Saint-Blaise-la-Roche; France
- Coordinates: 48.407615°N 7.165479°E

Services
TER Grand Est
Location

Saint-Blaise-la-Roche - Poutay train station (French: Gare de Saint-Blaise-la-Roche - Poutay) is a train station in France on the Strasbourg-Ville to Saint-Dié line. The station is located in the commune of Saint-Blaise-la-Roche, near Poutay (hamlet of Plaine), in the Alsace in the Grand Est region of France.

It is a stop of the French National Railway Company (SNCF) and is served by TER Grand Est trains.

== Location ==
Located at an altitude of 430 metres, the Saint-Blaise-la-Roche - Poutay station is located at kilometre point (PK) 52.346 on the Strasbourg-Ville to Saint-Dié line, between the Fouday and Saulxures stations.

== History ==
After major works, the new facilities were inaugurated on 19 November 2009.

In 2014, it was a local interest passenger station (category C: less than 100,000 passengers per year from 2010 to 2011), which had two platforms, a shelter and a level crossing for the public (TVP).

In 2023, local teenager Lina Delsarte disappeared while walking to the station.

== Frequentation ==
From 2015 to 2023, according to SNCF estimates, the annual attendance at the station will be as shown in the table below.

Year	2015	2016	2017	2018	2019	2020	2021	2022	2023
Travelers	44,420	44,583	44,093	37,984	42,757	34,872	39,027	55,525	57,192

== Passenger services ==
=== Arrivals ===
As an SNCF stop, it is an unmanaged stopping point (PANG) with free access.

=== Serving ===
Saint-Blaise-la-Roche - Poutay is a passenger stop on the TER Grand Est network, served by regional express trains on the route: Strasbourg-Ville - Saales - Saint-Dié-des-Vosges (line 08).

=== Intermodality ===
A bicycle park and a car park are located there.

La gare est desservie par des autocars à tarification TER sur la relation : Saint-Dié - Molsheim (ou Rothau)

The station is served by TER coaches on the route: Saint-Dié - Molsheim (or Rothau).

== Railway heritage ==
A postcard made before 1918 shows the station in a location roughly the same as the current station.

The station was rebuilt in the 1920s, the passenger building (BV) is similar to that of Fouday station, from which it is distinguished by the arrangement of the openings in the lower wing (two single bays and three groups of double windows). The main two-story building is partly clad in tile cladding with rounded ends; the transverse ridge roof is half-hipped with a dormer window at the gables and extends into a lean-to section accommodating the entrance to the station master and the staircase. The goods hall is located in a separate wooden building.

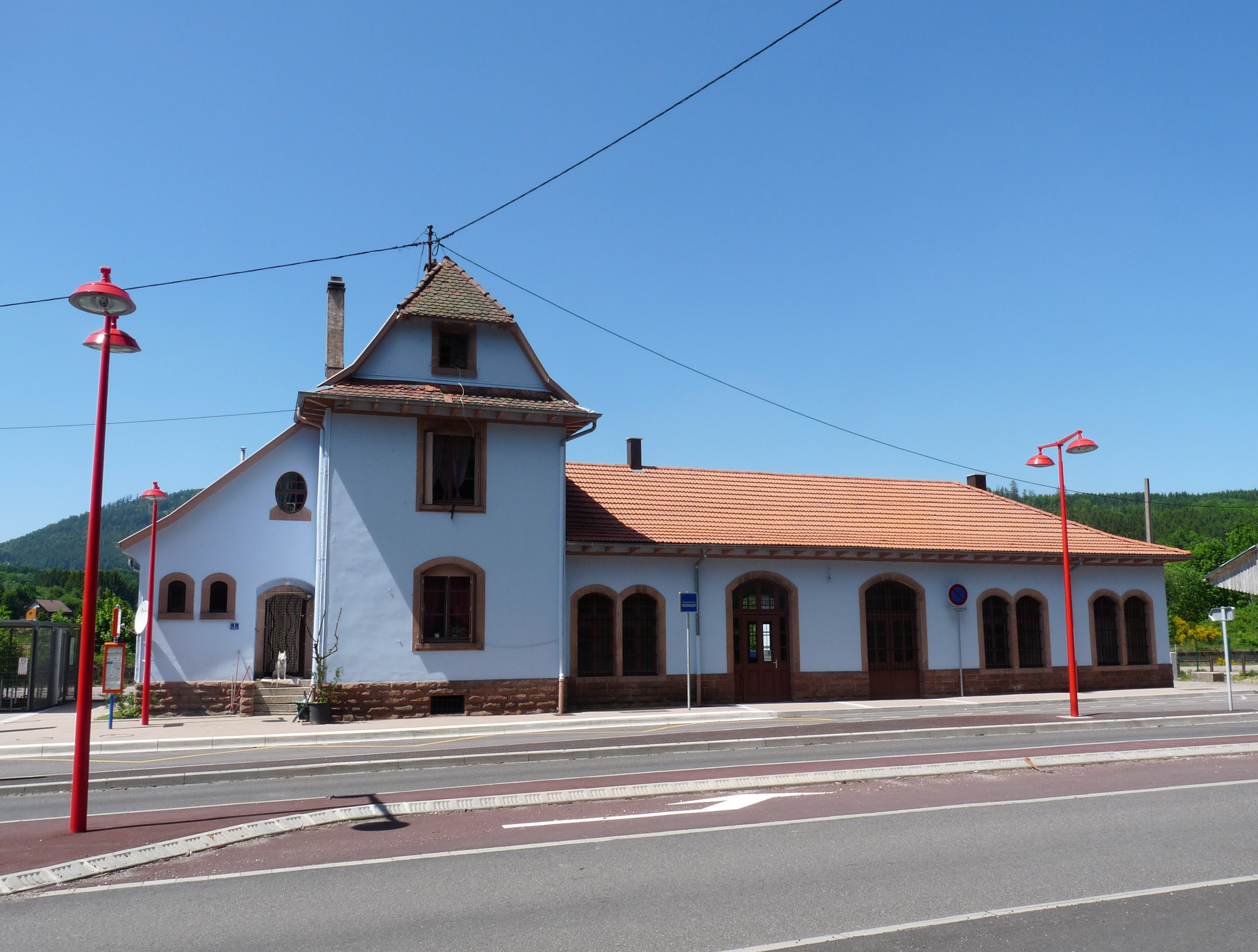
The BV street side

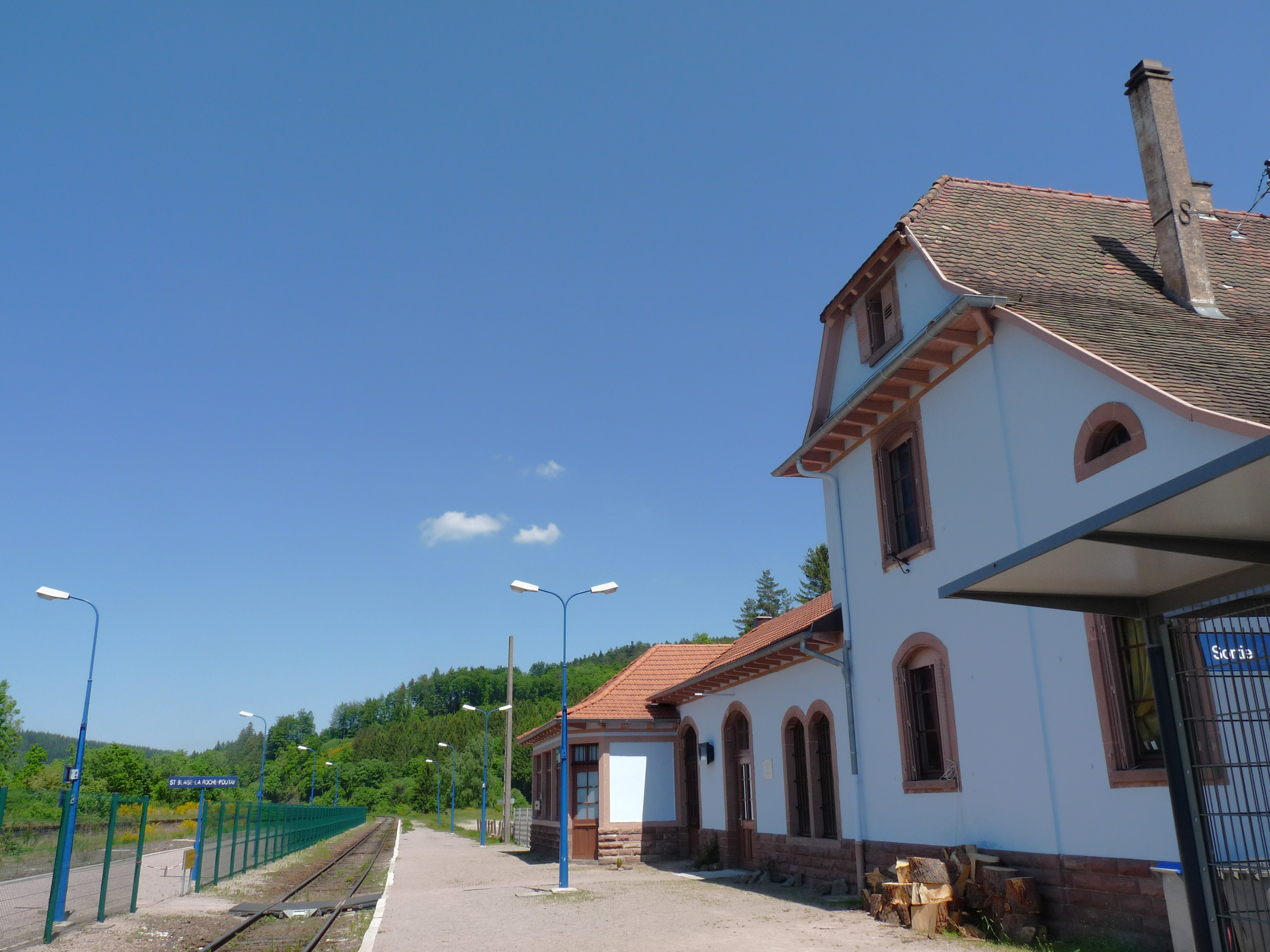
Dock side

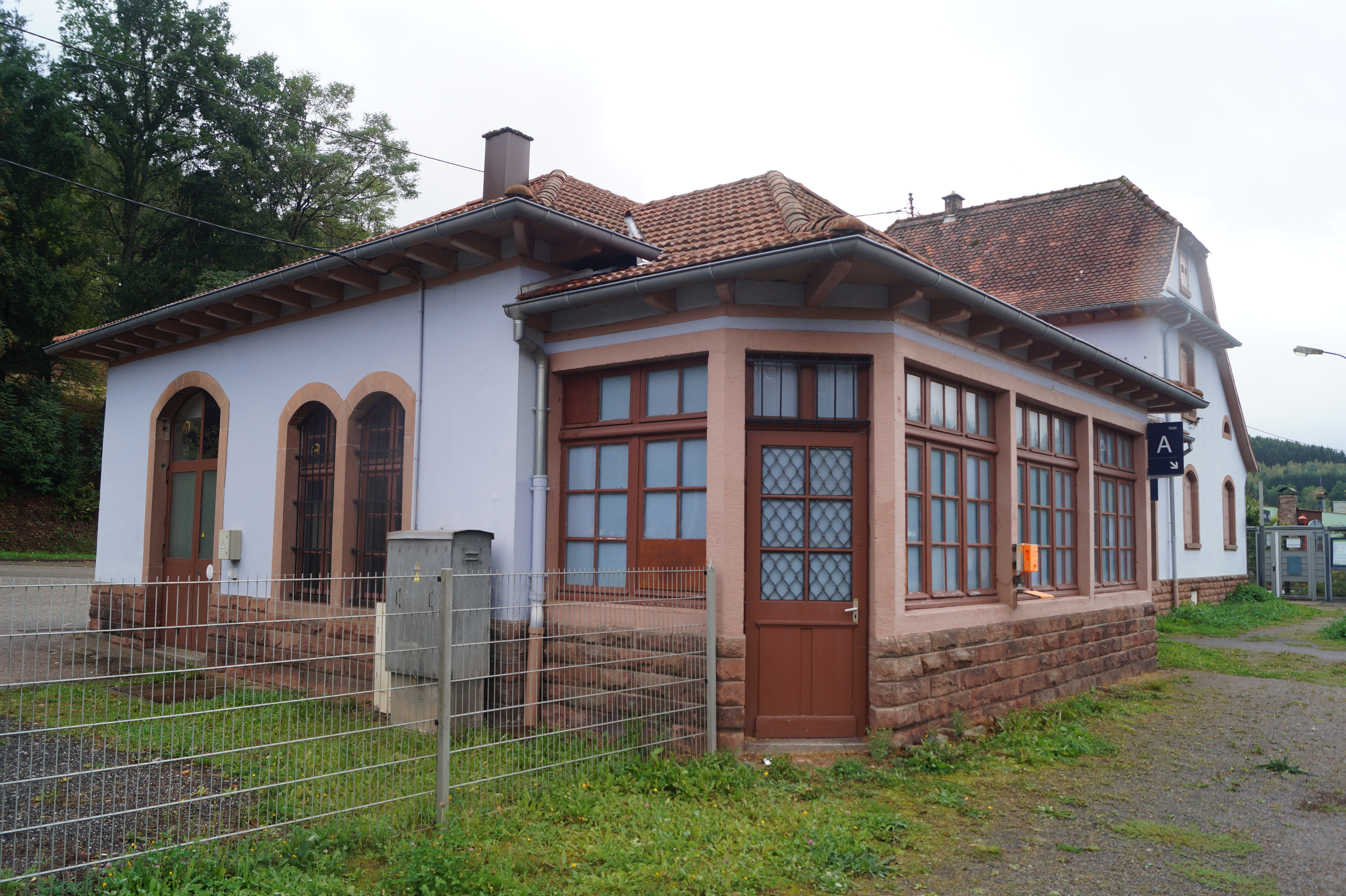
Extension

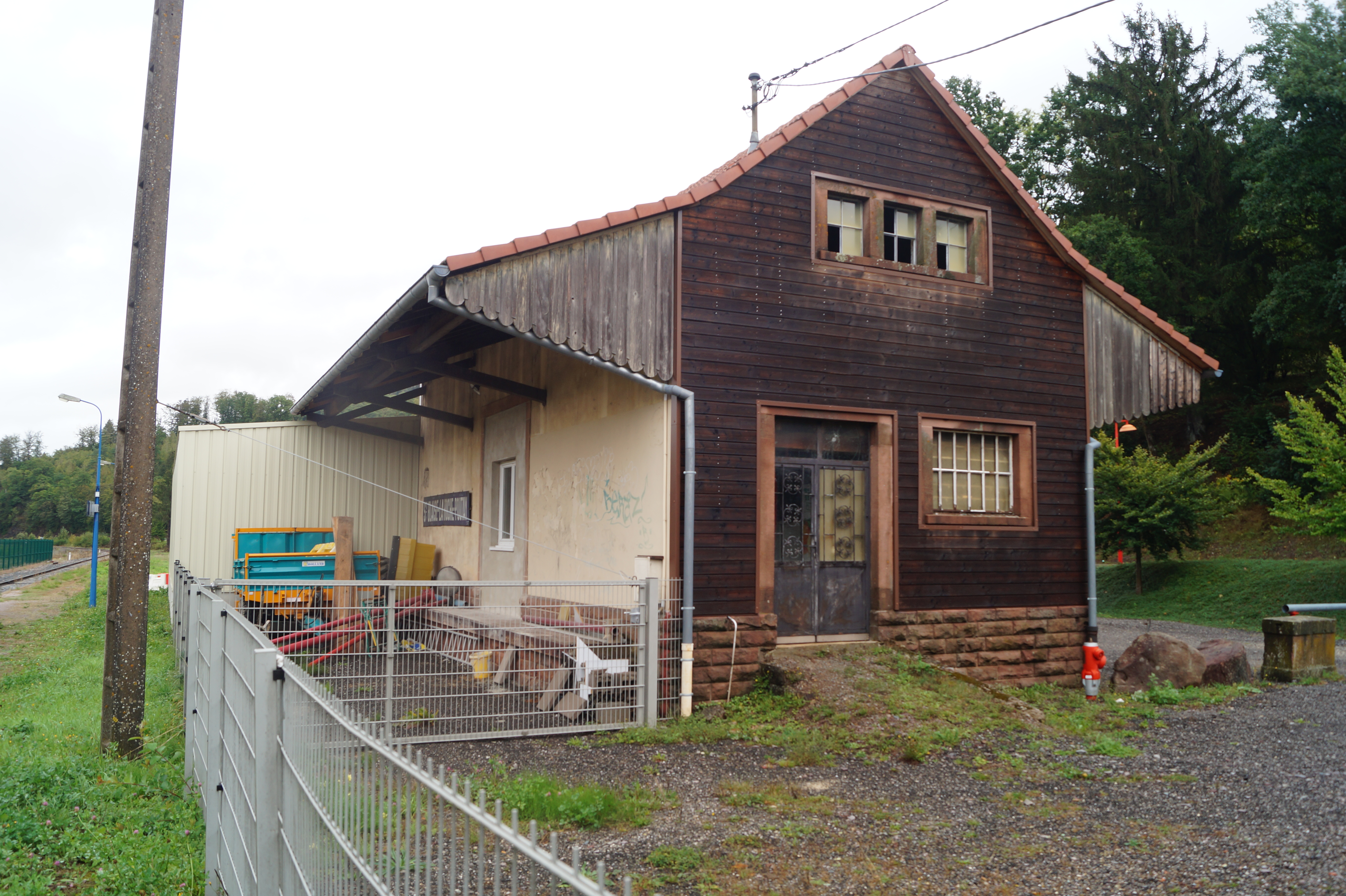
Goods hall

== See also ==
- List of SNCF stations
