= Coulanges-lès-Nevers =

- Commune
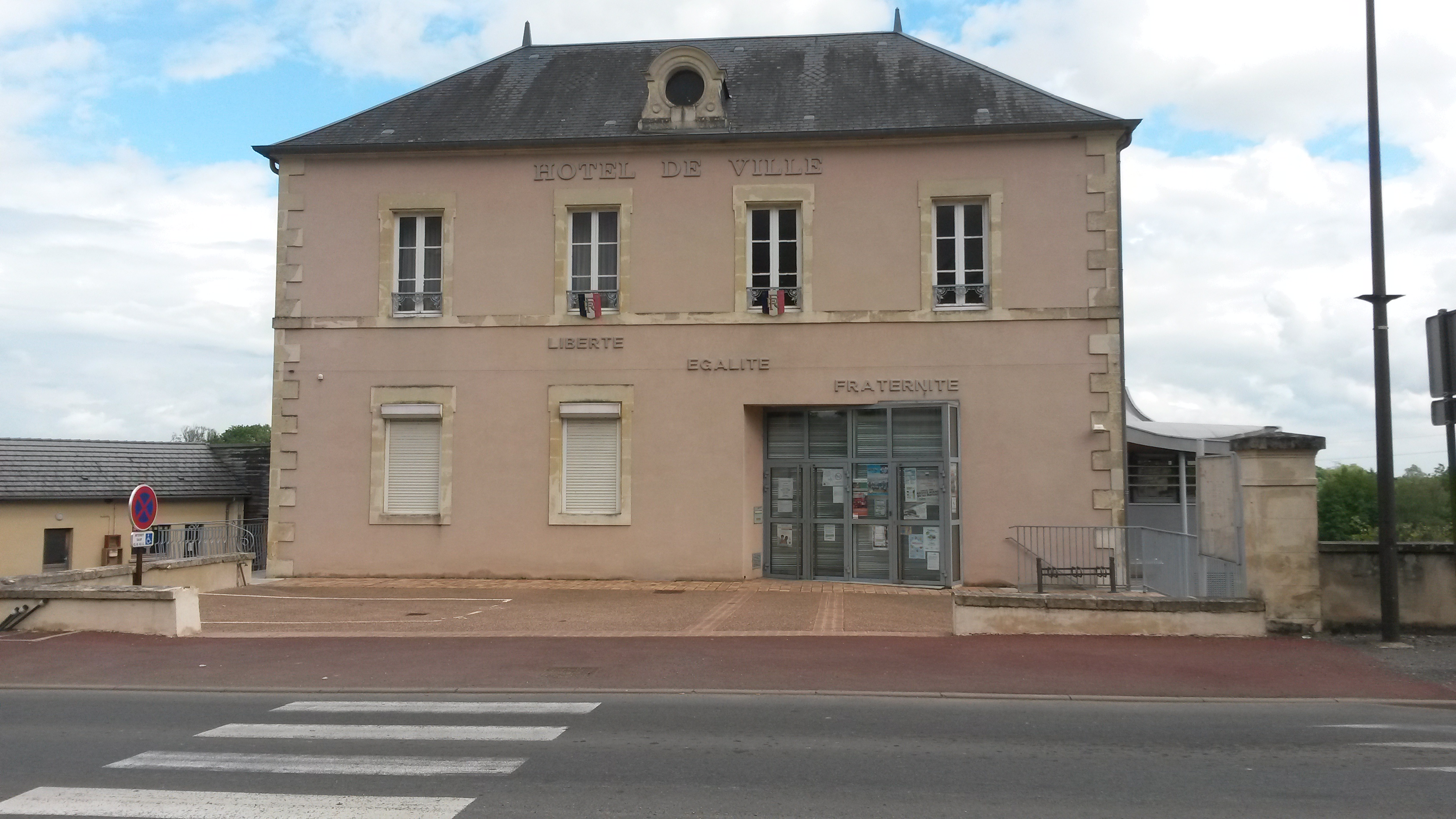
- Town hall
- Location of Coulanges-lès-Nevers
- Location within France Location within Bourgogne-Franche-Comté
- Coordinates: 47°00′21″N 3°11′15″E
- Country: France
- Region: Bourgogne-Franche-Comté
- Department: Nièvre
- Arrondissement: Nevers
- Canton: Nevers-1
- Intercommunality: CA Nevers

Government
  - Mayor (2020–2026): Julien Jouhanneau
- Area^{1}: 10.80 km^{2} (4.17 sq mi)
- Elevation: 200 m (660 ft)
- Highest elevation: 242 m (794 ft)
- Lowest elevation: 175 m (574 ft)
- Population (2023): 3,688
  - Density: 341.5/km^{2} (884.4/sq mi)
- Time zone: UTC+01:00 (CET)
  - Summer (DST): UTC+02:00 (CEST)
- INSEE/Postal code: 58088 /58660
- ^{1} French Land Register data, which excludes lakes, ponds, glaciers > 1 km^{2} (0.386 sq mi or 247 acres) and river estuaries.

Coulanges-lès-Nevers (French pronunciation: [kulɑ̃ʒ lɛ nəvɛʁ], literally Coulanges near Nevers) is a commune in the Nièvre department in central France.

== Demographics ==
Historical population
Year	Pop.	±% p.a.
1968	1,926	—
1975	3,116	+7.11%
1982	3,788	+2.83%
1990	3,544	−0.83%
1999	3,502	−0.13%
2007	3,527	+0.09%
2012	3,582	+0.31%
2017	3,629	+0.26%
2023	3,688	+0.27%
Source: INSEE

== See also ==
- Communes of the Nièvre department
