= Saint-Éloi, Nièvre =

Saint-Éloi
- Commune
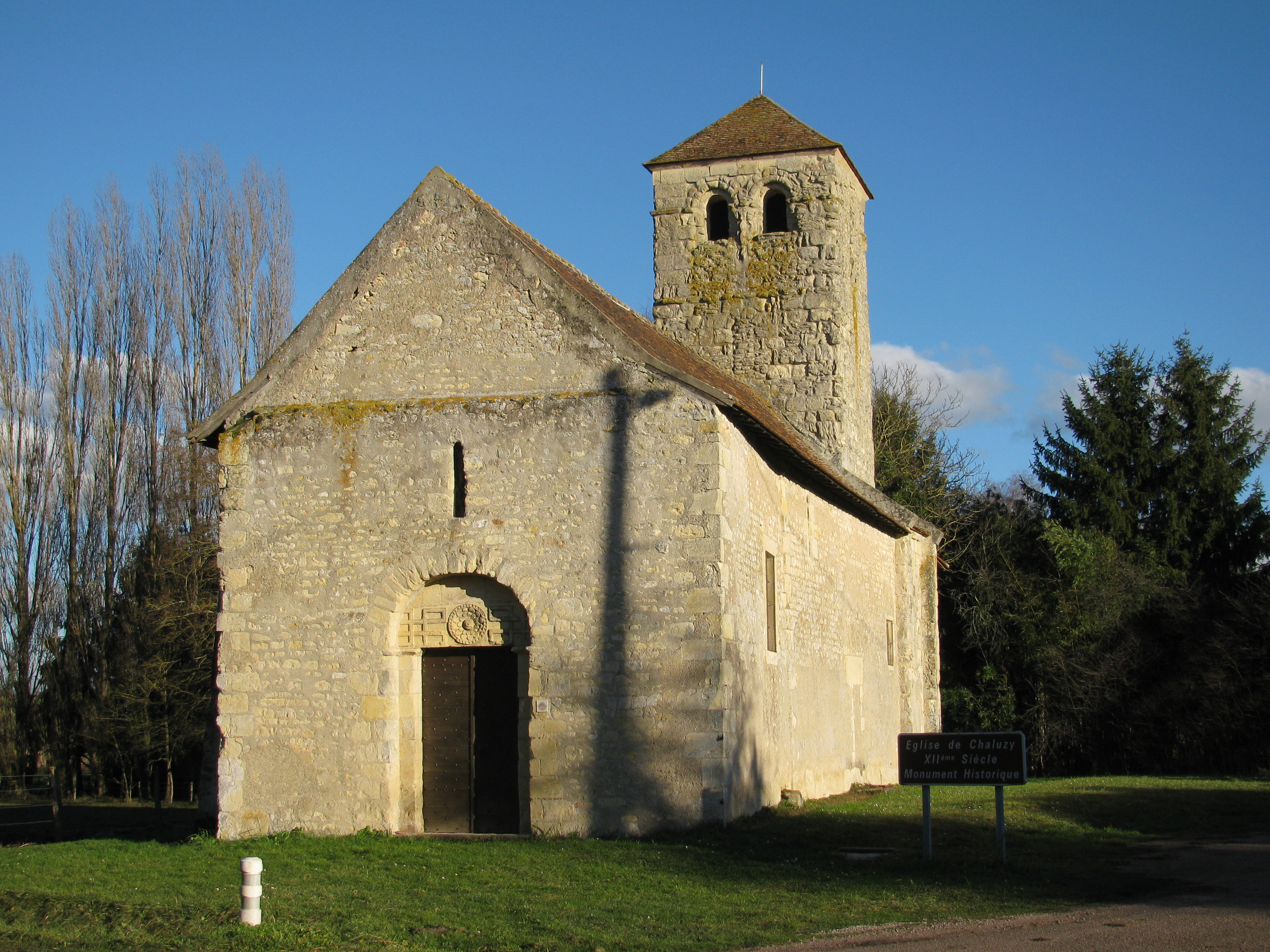
- The church of Saint-Symphorien-Chaluzy
- Location of Saint-Éloi
- Location within France Location within Bourgogne-Franche-Comté
- Coordinates: 46°58′29″N 3°13′19″E
- Country: France
- Region: Bourgogne-Franche-Comté
- Department: Nièvre
- Arrondissement: Nevers
- Canton: Nevers-2
- Intercommunality: CA Nevers

Government
  - Mayor (2020–2026): Jérôme Malus
- Area^{1}: 16.45 km^{2} (6.35 sq mi)
- Highest elevation: 244 m (801 ft)
- Lowest elevation: 171 m (561 ft)
- Population (2023): 2,296
  - Density: 139.6/km^{2} (361.5/sq mi)
- Time zone: UTC+01:00 (CET)
  - Summer (DST): UTC+02:00 (CEST)
- INSEE/Postal code: 58238 /58000
- ^{1} French Land Register data, which excludes lakes, ponds, glaciers > 1 km^{2} (0.386 sq mi or 247 acres) and river estuaries.

Saint-Éloi (French pronunciation: [sɛ̃.t‿elwa]) is a commune in the Nièvre department, central France.

== Population ==
Historical population
Year	Pop.	±% p.a.
1968	946	—
1975	1,000	+0.80%
1982	1,484	+5.80%
1990	1,805	+2.48%
1999	1,904	+0.60%
2007	1,969	+0.42%
2012	2,146	+1.74%
2017	2,146	+0.00%
2023	2,296	+1.13%
Source: INSEE

== See also ==
- Communes of the Nièvre department
