= Canton of Fourchambault =

Coordinates: 47.02°N 3.08°E

The canton of Fourchambault is an administrative division of the Nièvre department, central France. It was created at the French canton reorganisation which came into effect in March 2015. Its seat is in Fourchambault.

It consists of the following communes:

1. Fourchambault
2. Garchizy
3. Germigny-sur-Loire
4. Marzy
