= Gimouille =

- Commune
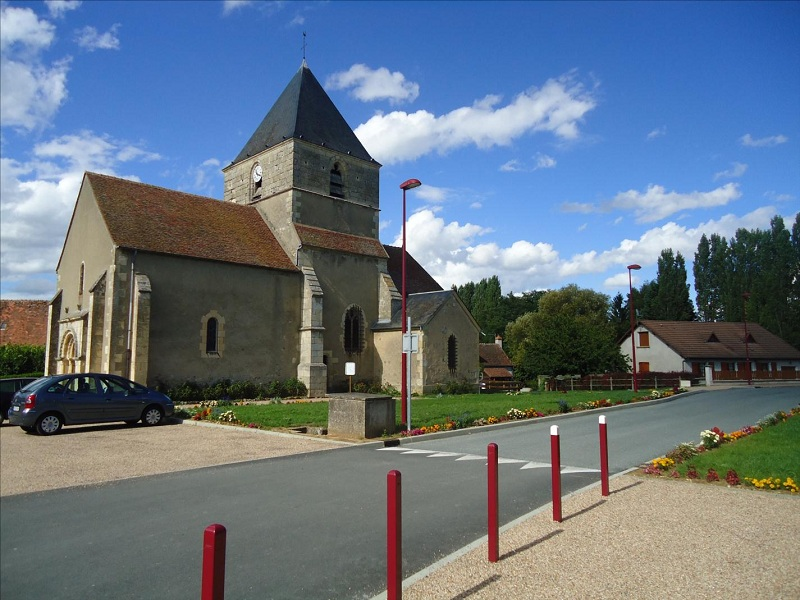
- The church in Gimouille
- Location of Gimouille
- Location within France Location within Bourgogne-Franche-Comté
- Coordinates: 46°56′38″N 3°05′09″E
- Country: France
- Region: Bourgogne-Franche-Comté
- Department: Nièvre
- Arrondissement: Nevers
- Canton: Nevers-3
- Intercommunality: CA Nevers

Government
  - Mayor (2020–2026): Alain Bourcier
- Area^{1}: 14.26 km^{2} (5.51 sq mi)
- Highest elevation: 272 m (892 ft)
- Lowest elevation: 166 m (545 ft)
- Population (2023): 405
  - Density: 28.4/km^{2} (73.6/sq mi)
- Time zone: UTC+01:00 (CET)
  - Summer (DST): UTC+02:00 (CEST)
- INSEE/Postal code: 58126 /58470
- ^{1} French Land Register data, which excludes lakes, ponds, glaciers > 1 km^{2} (0.386 sq mi or 247 acres) and river estuaries.

Gimouille (French pronunciation: [ʒimuj]) is a commune in the Nièvre department in central France.

== Demographics ==
Historical population
Year	Pop.	±% p.a.
1968	380	—
1975	307	−3.00%
1982	270	−1.82%
1990	506	+8.17%
1999	512	+0.13%
2007	487	−0.62%
2012	463	−1.01%
2017	459	−0.17%
2023	405	−2.06%
Source: INSEE

== See also ==
- Communes of the Nièvre department
