= Challuy =

- Commune
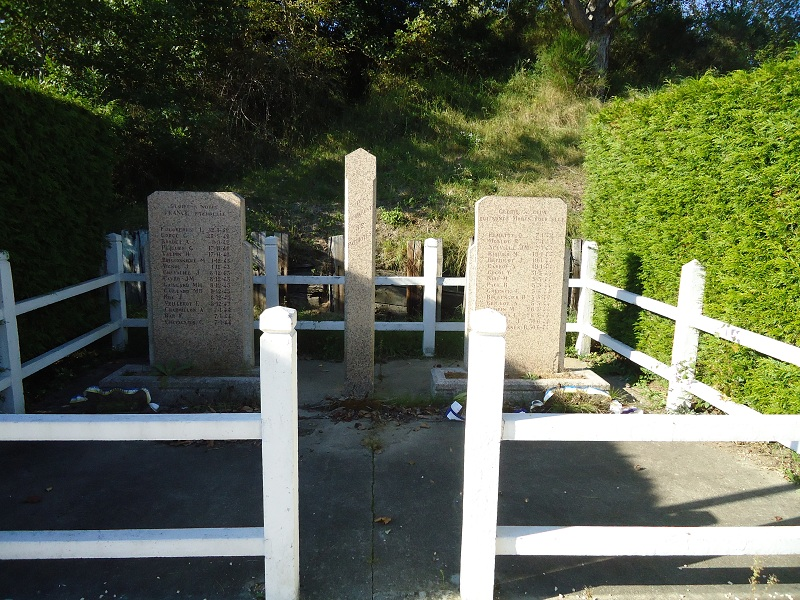
- Monument to the Executed

- Coat of arms
- Location of Challuy
- Location within France Location within Bourgogne-Franche-Comté
- Coordinates: 46°57′04″N 3°08′57″E
- Country: France
- Region: Bourgogne-Franche-Comté
- Department: Nièvre
- Arrondissement: Nevers
- Canton: Nevers-3
- Intercommunality: CA Nevers

Government
  - Mayor (2020–2026): Fabrice Berger
- Area^{1}: 18.89 km^{2} (7.29 sq mi)
- Highest elevation: 277 m (909 ft)
- Lowest elevation: 169 m (554 ft)
- Population (2023): 1,453
  - Density: 76.92/km^{2} (199.2/sq mi)
- Time zone: UTC+01:00 (CET)
  - Summer (DST): UTC+02:00 (CEST)
- INSEE/Postal code: 58051 /58000
- ^{1} French Land Register data, which excludes lakes, ponds, glaciers > 1 km^{2} (0.386 sq mi or 247 acres) and river estuaries.

Challuy (French pronunciation: [ʃalɥi]) is a commune in the Nièvre department in central France, part of the metropolitan area of Nevers.

== See also ==
- Communes of the Nièvre department
