= Ngore Sarr =

Senegalese footballer (1964–1992)

Personal information
- Date of birth: 21 February 1964
- Place of birth: Podor, Senegal
- Date of death: 23 December 1992 (aged 28)
- Place of death: Sermoise-sur-Loire, France
- Height: 1.73 m (5 ft 8 in)
- Position: Forward

Senior career*
Years	Team	Apps	(Gls)
1985–1988	AS Douanes		
1988–1989	Laval	1	(1)
1989–1991	Olympique Argentan		
1991–1992	JGA Nevers		
- * Club domestic league appearances and goals

Ngore Sarr (often spelled Ngor Sarr; 21 February 1964 – 23 December 1992) was a Senegalese footballer who played as a forward.

== Career ==
Sarr won the Senegal FA Cup in 1986 with AS Douanes—who were playing in the second division at the time—by scoring the winning goal from a penalty in the final minute.

In 1988, Sarr moved to France to join French Division 1 side Laval. He then moved to Olympique Argentan in the Division d'Honneur in 1989.

== Death ==
On 23 December 1992, Sarr died in an accident in Sermoise-sur-Loire, France, at the age of 28.

== Honours ==
AS Douanes

- Senegal FA Cup: 1986
