= Germigny-sur-Loire =

- Commune
- Location of Germigny-sur-Loire
- Location within France Location within Bourgogne-Franche-Comté
- Coordinates: 47°04′54″N 3°02′19″E
- Country: France
- Region: Bourgogne-Franche-Comté
- Department: Nièvre
- Arrondissement: Nevers
- Canton: Fourchambault
- Intercommunality: CA Nevers

Government
  - Mayor (2024–2026): Philippe Revel
- Area^{1}: 18.78 km^{2} (7.25 sq mi)
- Highest elevation: 240 m (790 ft)
- Lowest elevation: 157 m (515 ft)
- Population (2023): 738
  - Density: 39.3/km^{2} (102/sq mi)
- Time zone: UTC+01:00 (CET)
  - Summer (DST): UTC+02:00 (CEST)
- INSEE/Postal code: 58124 /58320
- ^{1} French Land Register data, which excludes lakes, ponds, glaciers > 1 km^{2} (0.386 sq mi or 247 acres) and river estuaries.

Germigny-sur-Loire (French pronunciation: [ʒɛʁmiɲi syʁ lwaʁ], literally Germigny on Loire) is a commune in the Nièvre department in central France. On 1 January 2022, the population was 748.

== See also ==
- Communes of the Nièvre department
