= Garchizy =

- Commune
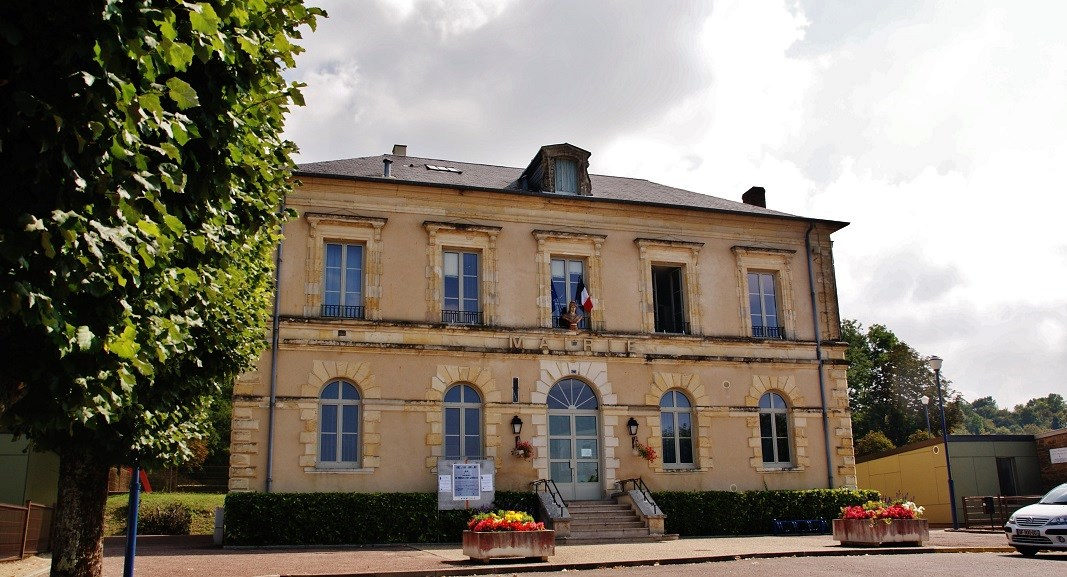
- The town hall in Garchizy
- Location of Garchizy
- Location within France Location within Bourgogne-Franche-Comté
- Coordinates: 47°02′53″N 3°05′46″E
- Country: France
- Region: Bourgogne-Franche-Comté
- Department: Nièvre
- Arrondissement: Nevers
- Canton: Fourchambault
- Intercommunality: CA Nevers

Government
  - Mayor (2020–2026): Michel Monet
- Area^{1}: 16.42 km^{2} (6.34 sq mi)
- Highest elevation: 273 m (896 ft)
- Lowest elevation: 160 m (520 ft)
- Population (2023): 3,648
  - Density: 222.2/km^{2} (575.4/sq mi)
- Time zone: UTC+01:00 (CET)
  - Summer (DST): UTC+02:00 (CEST)
- INSEE/Postal code: 58121 /58600
- ^{1} French Land Register data, which excludes lakes, ponds, glaciers > 1 km^{2} (0.386 sq mi or 247 acres) and river estuaries.

Garchizy (French pronunciation: [ɡaʁʃizi]) is a commune in the Nièvre department in central France. Garchizy station has rail connections to Nevers and Cosne-sur-Loire.

== Demographics ==
Historical population
Year	Pop.	±% p.a.
1968	3,189	—
1975	3,711	+2.19%
1982	3,612	−0.39%
1990	3,939	+1.09%
1999	3,819	−0.34%
2007	3,646	−0.58%
2012	3,844	+1.06%
2017	3,726	−0.62%
2023	3,648	−0.35%
Source: INSEE

== See also ==
- Communes of the Nièvre department
