= Hantzbahn =

Coordinates: 48.40756°N 7.16516°E

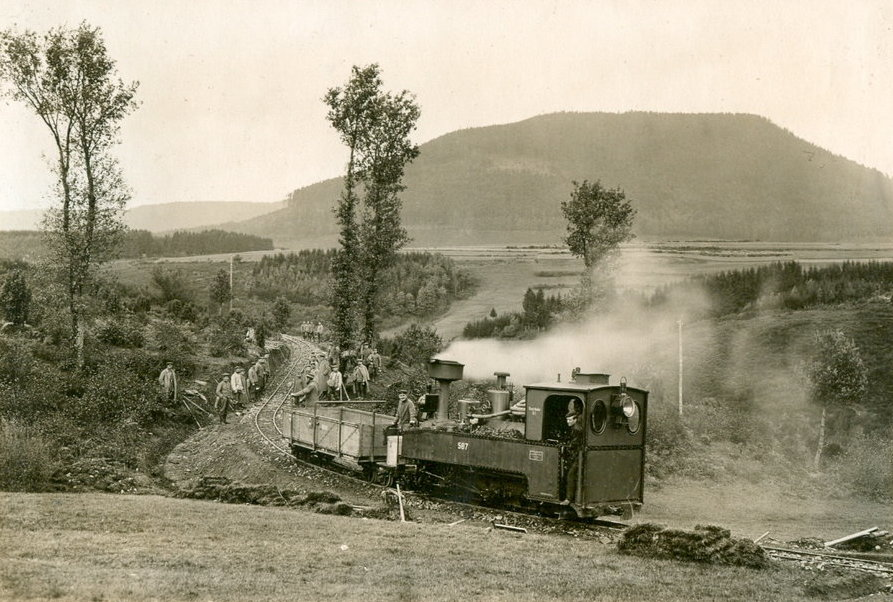
- Military steam locomotive (Brigadelok) at km 1.2 of the Hantzbahn with a view onto the Katzenstein

Technical
- Line length: 25.7 km (16.0 mi)
- Track gauge: 600 mm (1 ft 11 5/8 in)
Route map
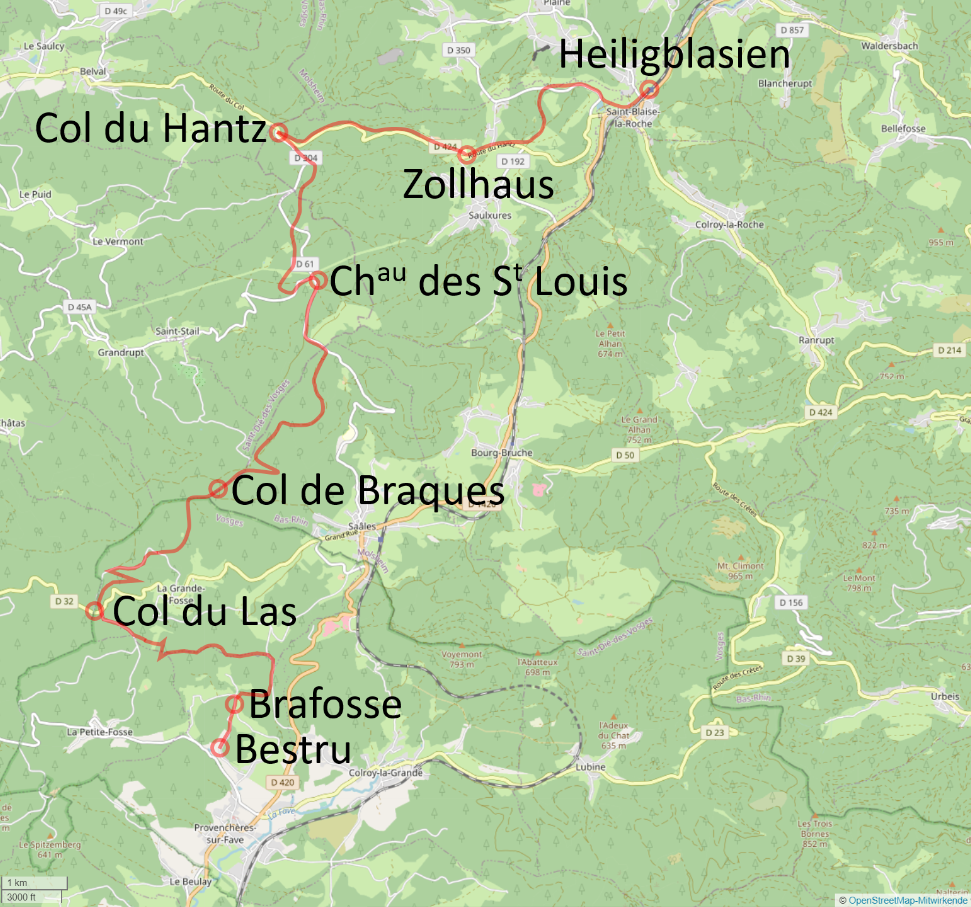
Former route of the light railway on a modern map
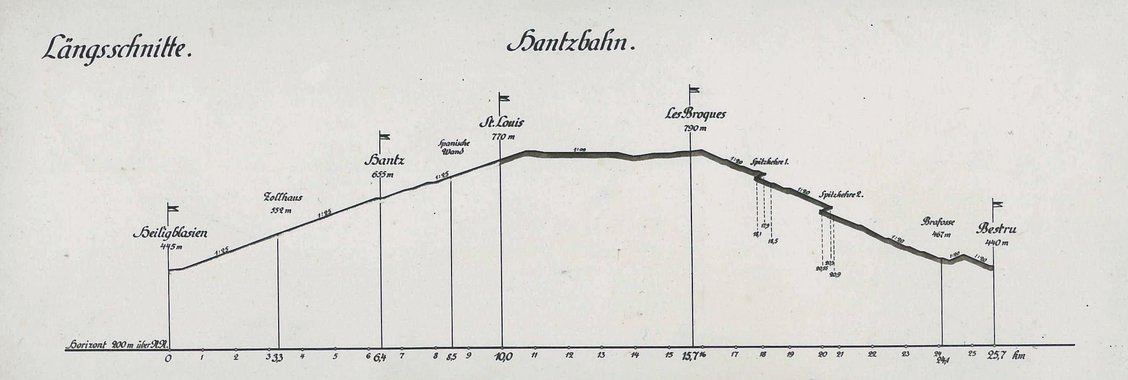
Height profile in a longitudinal section

The Hantzbahn was a 25.7 km (16 mi) long narrow-gauge railway with a gauge of 600 mm (1 ft 11 5/8 in) from Saint-Blaise-la-Roche in Alsace over the Hantz Pass and beyond.

== History ==
The Hantzbahn was laid in 1916 during World War I by German troops, Russian prisoners of war and local civilians as a military light railway using prefabricated rail track panels with a length of 5 meters. The railway was 25.7 km (16 mi) long and connected Saint-Blaise-la-Roche with Ban-de-Sapt to transport weapons, ammunition and supplies to the front and to return wounded soldiers in the opposite direction to hospitals. The highest point of the railway was 798 m (2,618 ft) at Col des Braques about 2 km (1.2 mi) west of Saales. The railway ended in Bestru, a district in Provenchères-sur-Fave.

== Route ==
The light railway connected Saint-Blaise via the Hantz Pass with the front line at Ban-de-Sapt, in order to transport weapons, ammunition and supplies to the front and wounded soldiers in the opposite direction to the hospitals.

== Operation ==
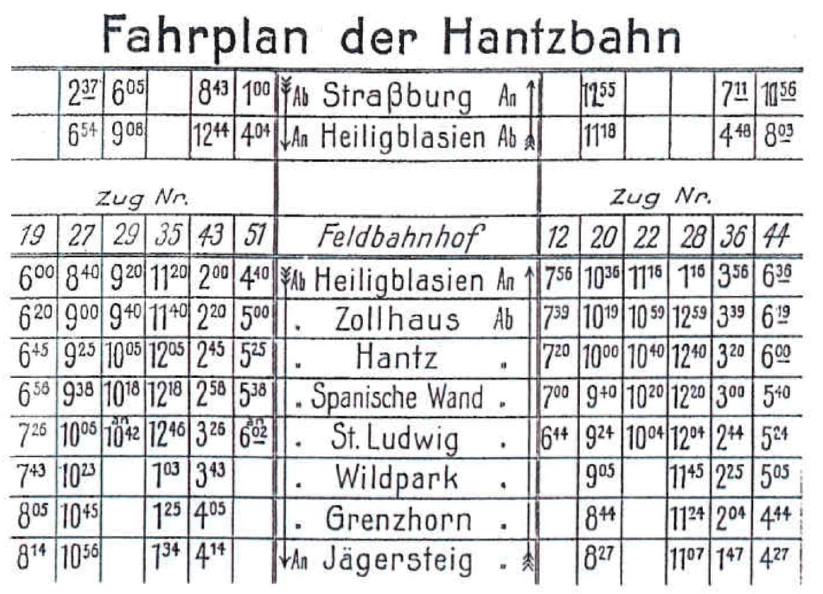
Timetable

The light railway line started operating in July 1916. The operation was organized according to a timetable with precise service instructions regarding the type of locomotives, the number of wagons, the speeds and the tonnages that had to be complied with depending on the section of the route. A total of 176 people were employed for the smooth operation of the six steam locomotives and four benzene locomotives as well as for the maintenance of the rail vehicles and tracks. It was single track line with eight stations, where trains could be crossed or overtaken using the double-track passing loops.

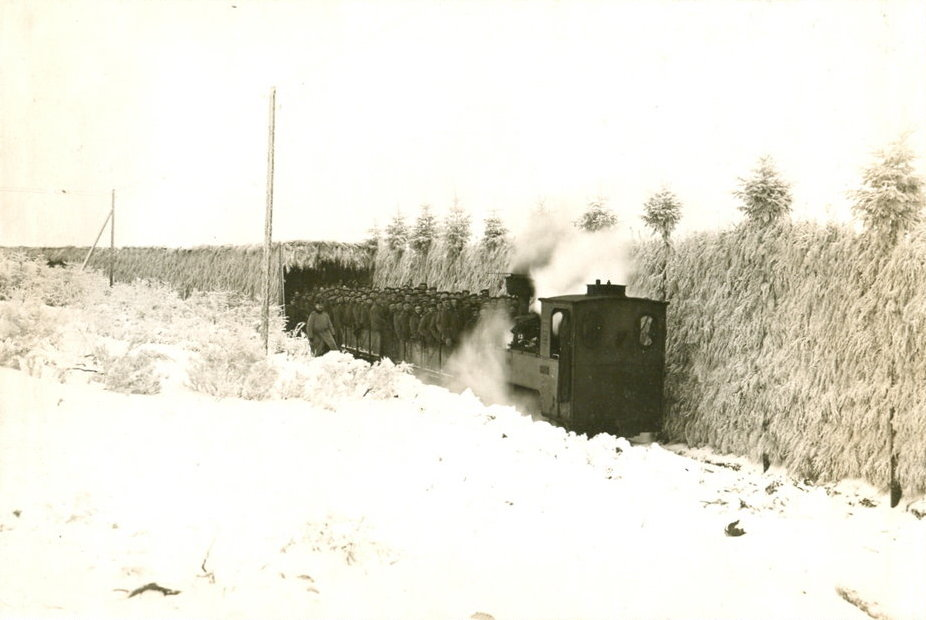
Tunnel-shaped camouflage panel between Spanische Wand station and St. Louis station

In the vicinity of the front line, the less powerful gasoline locomotives offered advantages over the 0-8-0 brigade locomotives, because the smoke was easy to spot by the enemy. For better camouflage in the woodless area, camouflage tunnels were installed, which gave the station "Spanische Wand" its name, meaning paravent in German.

== Remains ==
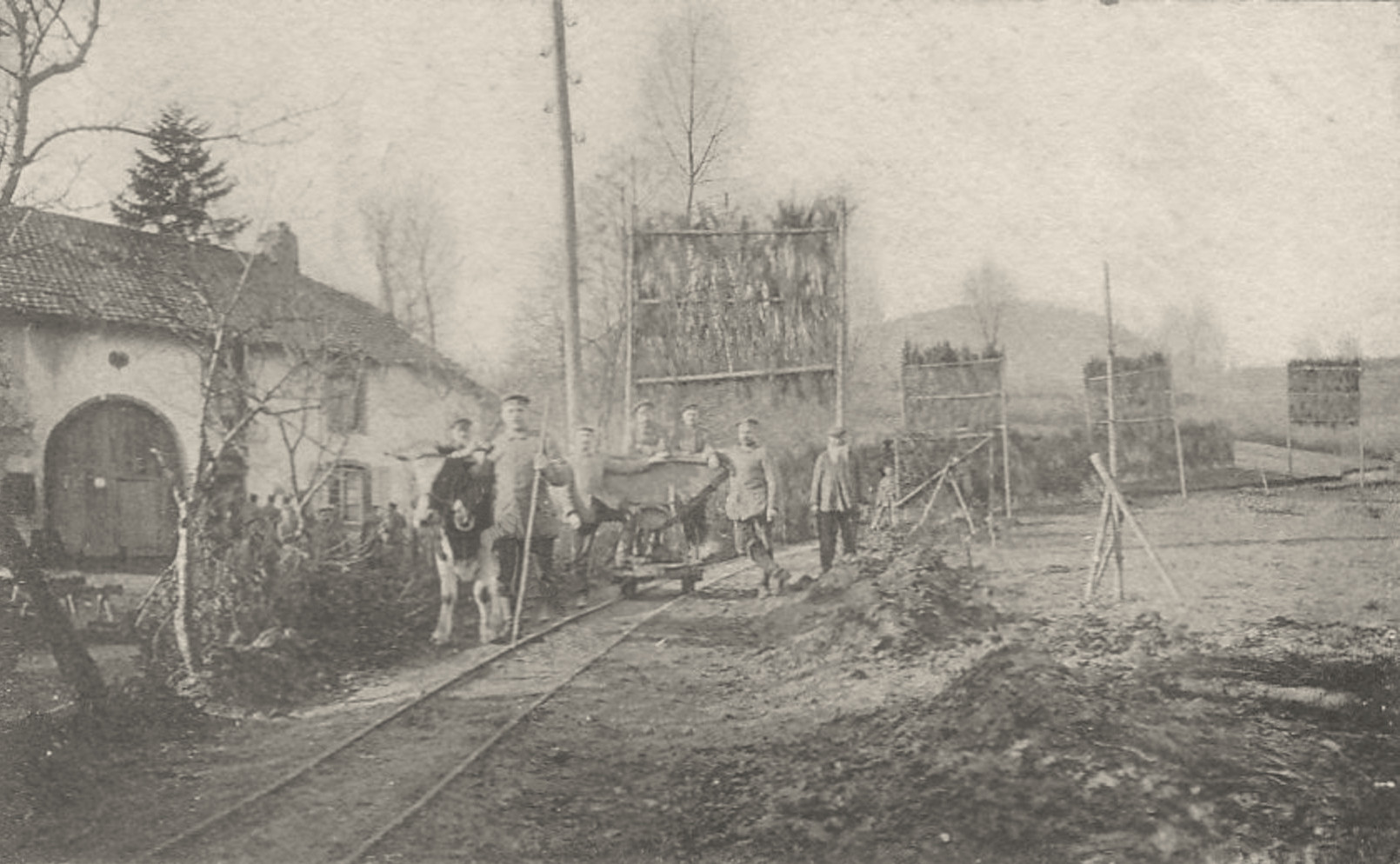
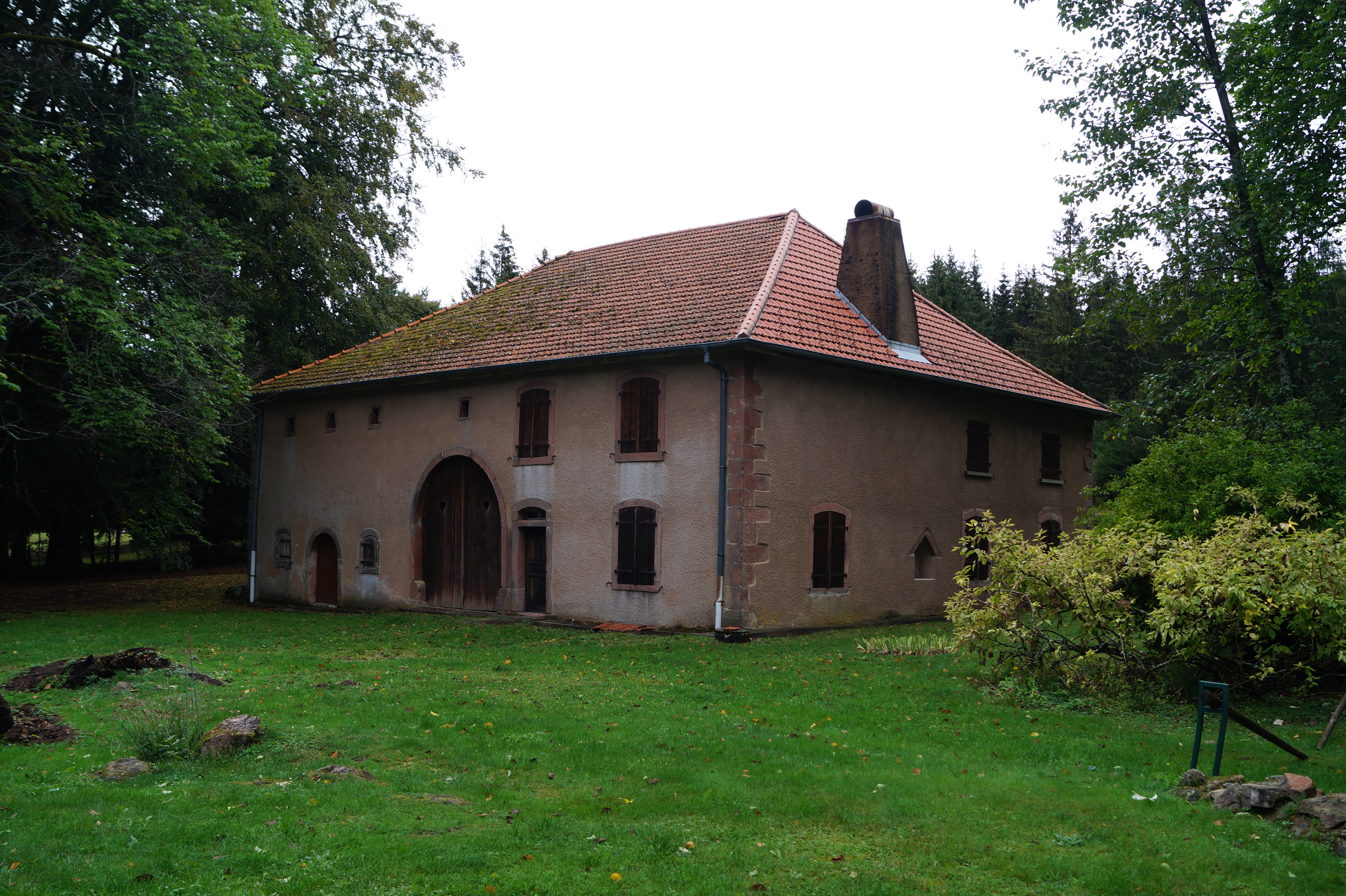
La cense de Belfays à Saint-Stail, 768 metres (2,520 ft) above sea level

In the post-war period, the tracks were dismantled and scrapped. The old customs house on the road to the Col du Hantz, the former border station at the top of the pass and the Château des St Louis on the D61 are still standing.
