= Communauté d'agglomération de Nevers =

Nevers
- Communauté d'agglomération
- Interactive map of Nevers
- Coordinates: 47°00′N 03°10′E
- Country: France
- Region: Bourgogne-Franche-Comté
- Department: Nièvre
- No. of communes: {{{nbcomm}}}
- Established: 2003
- Area: 266.4 km^{2} (102.9 sq mi)
- Population (2021): 67,223
  - Density: 252.3/km^{2} (653.6/sq mi)
- Website: www.agglo-nevers.net

Communauté d'agglomération de Nevers is the communauté d'agglomération, an intercommunal structure, centred on the town of Nevers. It is located in the Nièvre department, in the Bourgogne-Franche-Comté region, central France. Created in 2003, its seat is in Nevers. The commune Saint-Éloi joined the communauté d'agglomération in January 2024. Its area is 266.4 km^{2}. Its population was 67,223 in 2021, of which 32,830 in Nevers proper.

== Composition ==
The communauté d'agglomération consists of the following 14 communes:

1. Challuy
2. Coulanges-lès-Nevers
3. Fourchambault
4. Garchizy
5. Germigny-sur-Loire
6. Gimouille
7. Marzy
8. Nevers
9. Parigny-les-Vaux
10. Pougues-les-Eaux
11. Saincaize-Meauce
12. Saint-Éloi
13. Sermoise-sur-Loire
14. Varennes-Vauzelles
