= Marzy =

- Commune
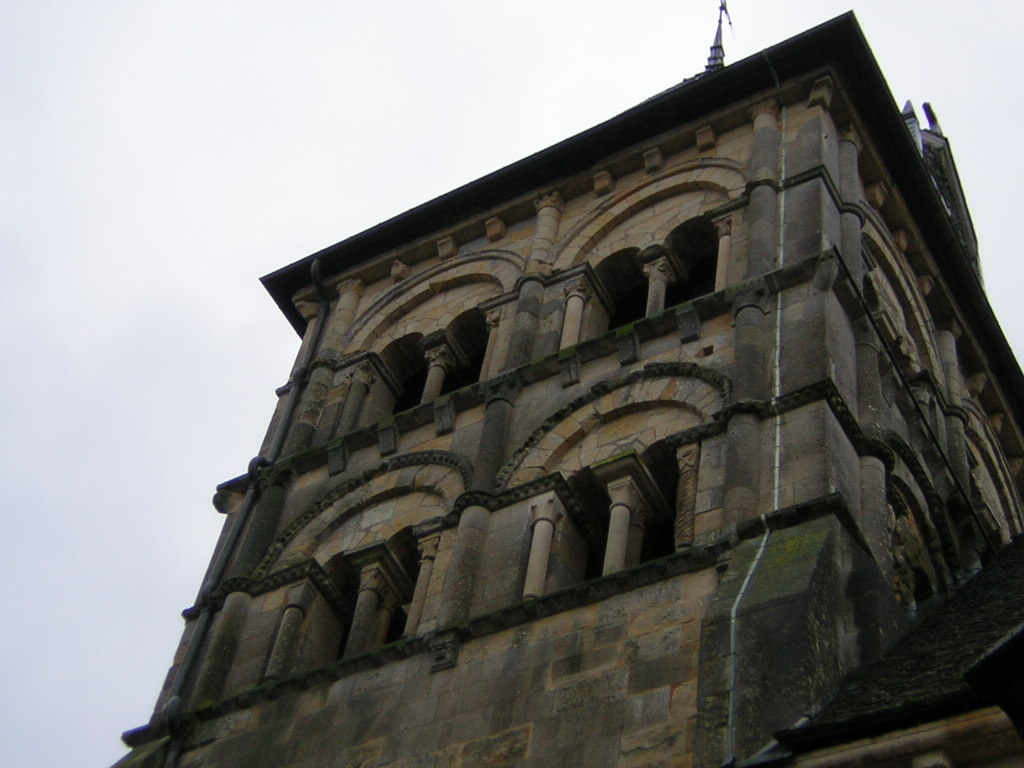
- The church tower in Marzy

- Coat of arms
- Location of Marzy
- Location within France Location within Bourgogne-Franche-Comté
- Coordinates: 46°58′54″N 3°05′39″E
- Country: France
- Region: Bourgogne-Franche-Comté
- Department: Nièvre
- Arrondissement: Nevers
- Canton: Fourchambault
- Intercommunality: CA Nevers

Government
  - Mayor (2020–2026): Louis-François Martin
- Area^{1}: 24.41 km^{2} (9.42 sq mi)
- Highest elevation: 240 m (790 ft)
- Lowest elevation: 162 m (531 ft)
- Population (2023): 3,623
  - Density: 148.4/km^{2} (384.4/sq mi)
- Time zone: UTC+01:00 (CET)
  - Summer (DST): UTC+02:00 (CEST)
- INSEE/Postal code: 58160 /58180
- Website: www.marzy.fr
- ^{1} French Land Register data, which excludes lakes, ponds, glaciers > 1 km^{2} (0.386 sq mi or 247 acres) and river estuaries.

Marzy (French pronunciation: [maʁzi]) is a commune in the Nièvre department in central France.

== Demographics ==
Historical population
Year	Pop.	±% p.a.
1968	1,381	—
1975	2,199	+6.87%
1982	2,621	+2.54%
1990	3,032	+1.84%
1999	3,051	+0.07%
2007	3,434	+1.49%
2012	3,639	+1.17%
2017	3,672	+0.18%
2023	3,623	−0.22%
Source: INSEE

== See also ==
- Communes of the Nièvre department
