= Tom Nevers =

Tom Nevers may refer to:

- Tom Nevers Naval Facility
- Thomas Nevers, American soccer player
