= Canton of Nevers-3 =

Canton of France

Coordinates: 46.99°N 3.16°E

The canton of Nevers-3 is an administrative division of the Nièvre department, central France. It was created at the French canton reorganisation which came into effect in March 2015. Its seat is in Nevers.

It consists of the following communes:

1. Challuy
2. Gimouille
3. Nevers (partly)
4. Saincaize-Meauce
