= Saint-Blaise-la-Roche =

- Commune
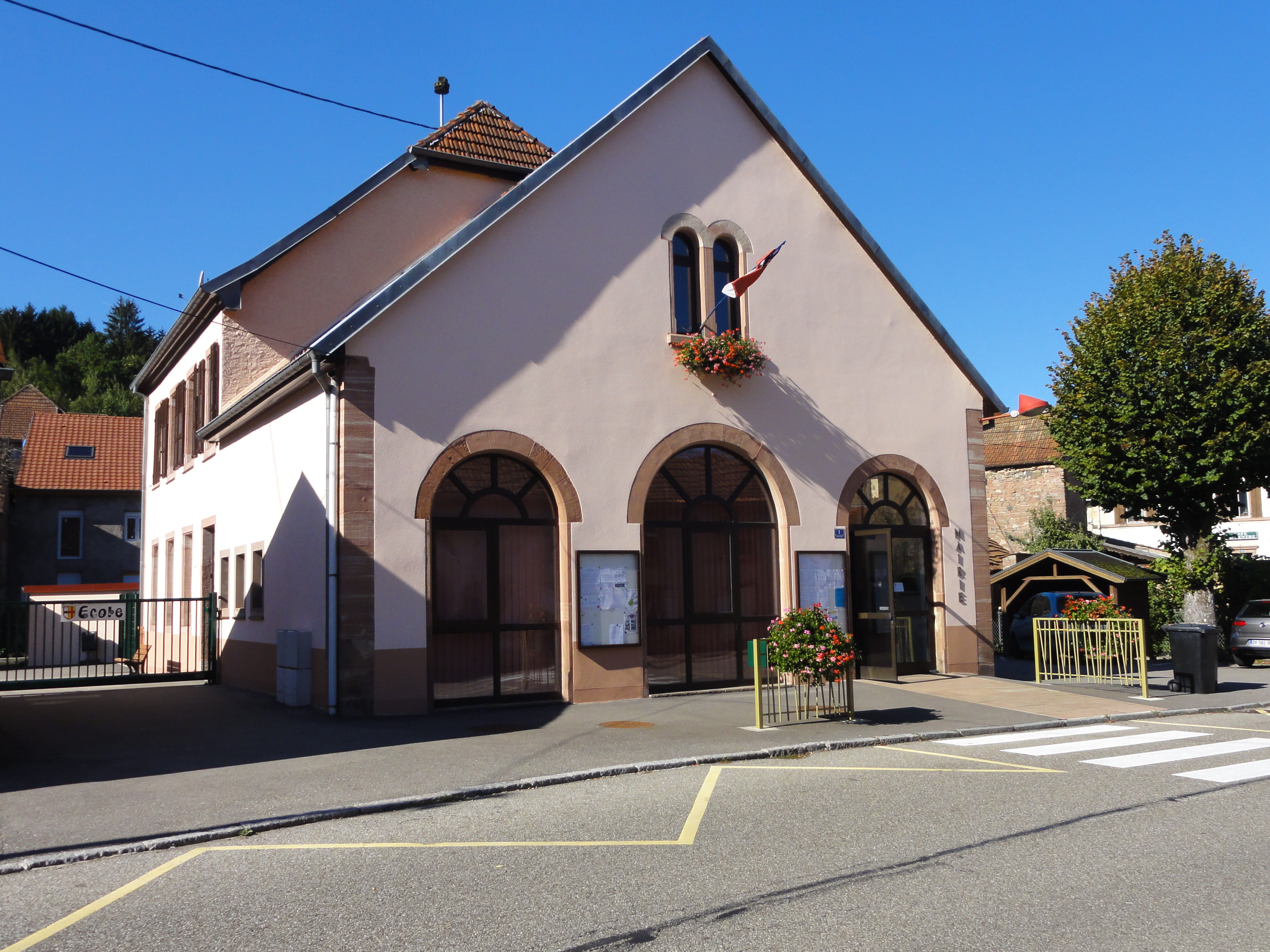
- The town hall in Saint-Blaise-la-Roche

- Coat of arms
- Location of Saint-Blaise-la-Roche
- Location within France Location within Grand Est
- Coordinates: 48°24′17″N 7°09′45″E
- Country: France
- Region: Grand Est
- Department: Bas-Rhin
- Arrondissement: Molsheim
- Canton: Mutzig

Government
  - Mayor (2020–2026): Gérard Desaga
- Area^{1}: 2.39 km^{2} (0.92 sq mi)
- Highest elevation: 661 m (2,169 ft)
- Lowest elevation: 404 m (1,325 ft)
- Population (2023): 239
  - Density: 100/km^{2} (259/sq mi)
- Time zone: UTC+01:00 (CET)
  - Summer (DST): UTC+02:00 (CEST)
- INSEE/Postal code: 67424 /67420
- ^{1} French Land Register data, which excludes lakes, ponds, glaciers > 1 km^{2} (0.386 sq mi or 247 acres) and river estuaries.

Saint-Blaise-la-Roche (French pronunciation: [sɛ̃ blɛz la ʁɔʃ]; German: Sankt Blasius) is a commune in the Bas-Rhin department in Grand Est in north-eastern France. The commune is served by Saint-Blaise-la-Roche - Poutay train station.

== See also ==
- Communes of the Bas-Rhin department
- Hantzbahn
