= Sermoise-sur-Loire =

- Commune
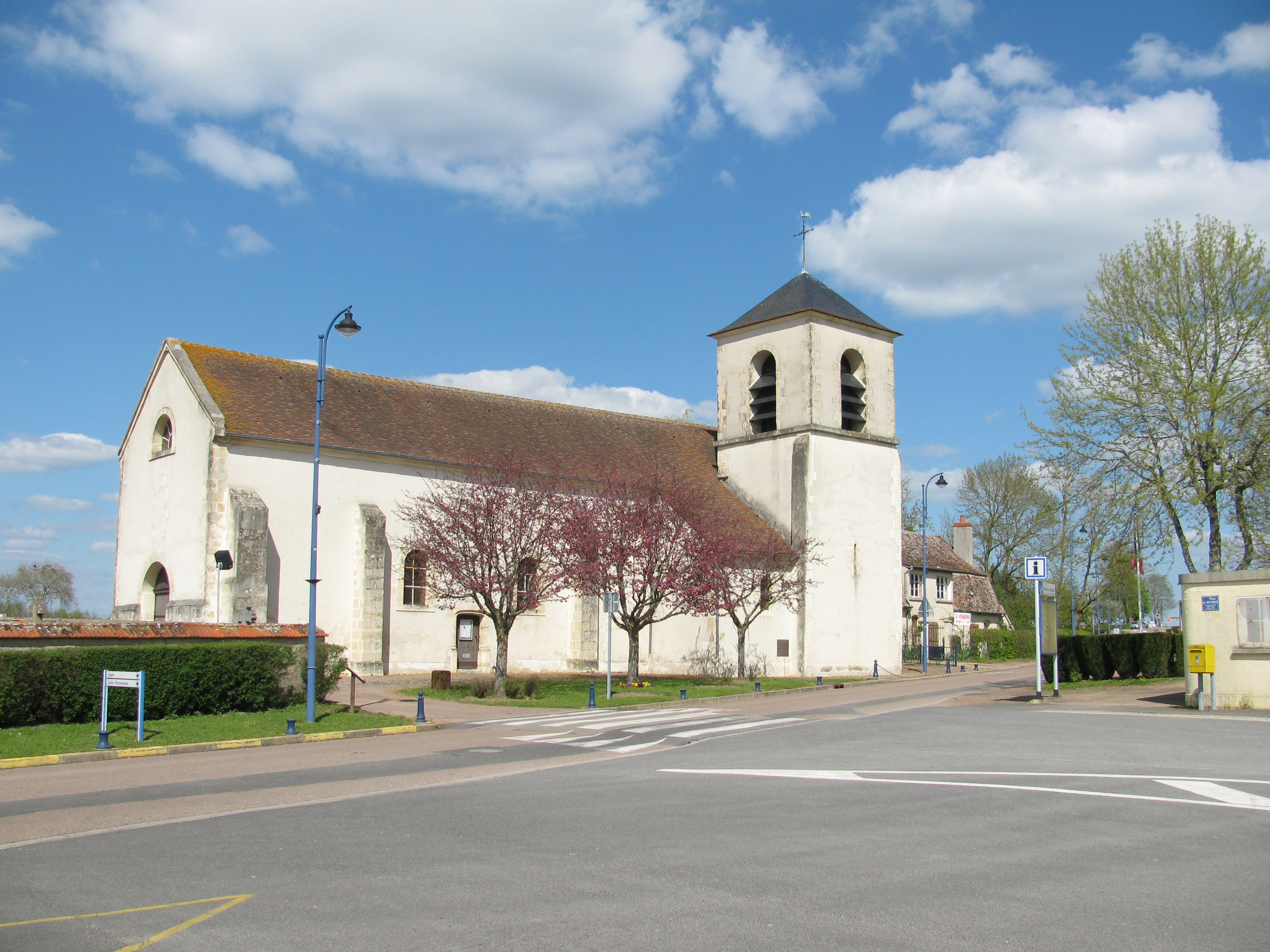
- The church of Saint-Maurice, in Sermoise

- Coat of arms
- Location of Sermoise-sur-Loire
- Location within France Location within Bourgogne-Franche-Comté
- Coordinates: 46°57′09″N 3°11′09″E
- Country: France
- Region: Bourgogne-Franche-Comté
- Department: Nièvre
- Arrondissement: Nevers
- Canton: Nevers-2
- Intercommunality: CA Nevers

Government
  - Mayor (2020–2026): Manuel De Jesus
- Area^{1}: 24.88 km^{2} (9.61 sq mi)
- Highest elevation: 277 m (909 ft)
- Lowest elevation: 169 m (554 ft)
- Population (2023): 1,486
  - Density: 59.73/km^{2} (154.7/sq mi)
- Time zone: UTC+01:00 (CET)
  - Summer (DST): UTC+02:00 (CEST)
- INSEE/Postal code: 58278 /58000
- ^{1} French Land Register data, which excludes lakes, ponds, glaciers > 1 km^{2} (0.386 sq mi or 247 acres) and river estuaries.

Sermoise-sur-Loire (French pronunciation: [sɛʁmwaz syʁ lwaʁ], literally Sermoise on Loire) is a commune in the Nièvre department in central France.

== Notable people ==
Ngore Sarr (1964 – 1992) a footballer from Senegal died here.

== See also ==
- Communes of the Nièvre department
