= Never =

Never may refer to:

== Music ==
=== Albums ===
- Never (Micachu and the Shapes album) or the title song, 2012
- Never (Mie album), 1984

=== Songs ===
- "Never" (Heart song), 1985
- "Never" (Jaheim song), 2007
- "Never" (JID song), 2016
- "Never" (Keyshia Cole song), 2004
- "Never" (Kristine W song), 2008
- "Never" (Moving Pictures song), 1984; covered by Mie, 1984
- "Never" (Produce 101 song), by the contestants of Produce 101 season 2, 2017
- "Never (Past Tense)", by the Roc Project and Tina Arena, 2003
- "Never", by the Cure from The Cure, 2004
- "Never", by Earth, Wind & Fire from The Promise, 2003
- "Never", by Electrafixion from Burned, 1995
- "Never", by Flo Rida from R.O.O.T.S., 2009
- "Never", by the House of Love from The House of Love, 1990
- "Never", by Jomanda, 1993
- "Never", by Marcus & Martinus from Moments, 2017
- "Never", by Moby Grape from Wow/Grape Jam, 1968
- "Never", by MUNA from Saves the World, 2019
- "Never", by Neuro-sama and Evil Neuro, 2025
- "Never", by Orbital from Wonky, 2012
- "Never", by Ozzy Osbourne from The Ultimate Sin, 1986
- "Never", by Paco from This Is Where We Live, 2004
- "Never", by Sevendust from Next, 2005
- "Never (These Days)", by Z-Ro, 2010

== Places ==
- Never, Amur Oblast, a rural locality in Russia
- Never, Bryansk Oblast, a rural locality in Russia
- Never, a crater on Mars

== Other uses ==
- Never (film), a 2014 American drama by Brett Allen Smith
- Never (novel), by Ken Follett, 2021
- NEVER (professional wrestling), a series of events held by New Japan Pro Wrestling
- never or Never, the bottom type in various programming languages

== See also ==
- Never Never (disambiguation)
- Never Never Never, a 1973 album by Shirley Bassey
- Nevers (disambiguation)
