= Plaine, Bas-Rhin =

Commune in northeastern France

Plaine
- Commune
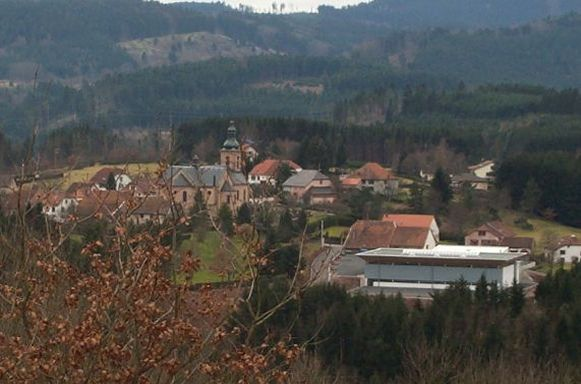
- A general view of Plaine

- Coat of arms
- Location of Plaine
- Location within France Location within Grand Est
- Coordinates: 48°25′09″N 7°08′47″E
- Country: France
- Region: Grand Est
- Department: Bas-Rhin
- Arrondissement: Molsheim
- Canton: Mutzig

Government
  - Mayor (2023–2026): Patricia Simoni
- Area^{1}: 22.84 km^{2} (8.82 sq mi)
- Highest elevation: 900 m (3,000 ft)
- Lowest elevation: 373 m (1,224 ft)
- Population (2023): 983
  - Density: 43.0/km^{2} (111/sq mi)
- Time zone: UTC+01:00 (CET)
  - Summer (DST): UTC+02:00 (CEST)
- INSEE/Postal code: 67377 /67420
- ^{1} French Land Register data, which excludes lakes, ponds, glaciers > 1 km^{2} (0.386 sq mi or 247 acres) and river estuaries.

Plaine (French pronunciation: [plɛn]; German: Blen) is a commune in the Bas-Rhin department in Grand Est in northeastern France. Five hamlets belong to the commune (Diespach, Poutay, Champenay, Le Bambois and Devant Fouday).

== See also ==
- Communes of the Bas-Rhin department
