= Palais ducal de Nevers =

15th/16th century French castle

Coordinates: 46°59′18″N 3°09′30″E

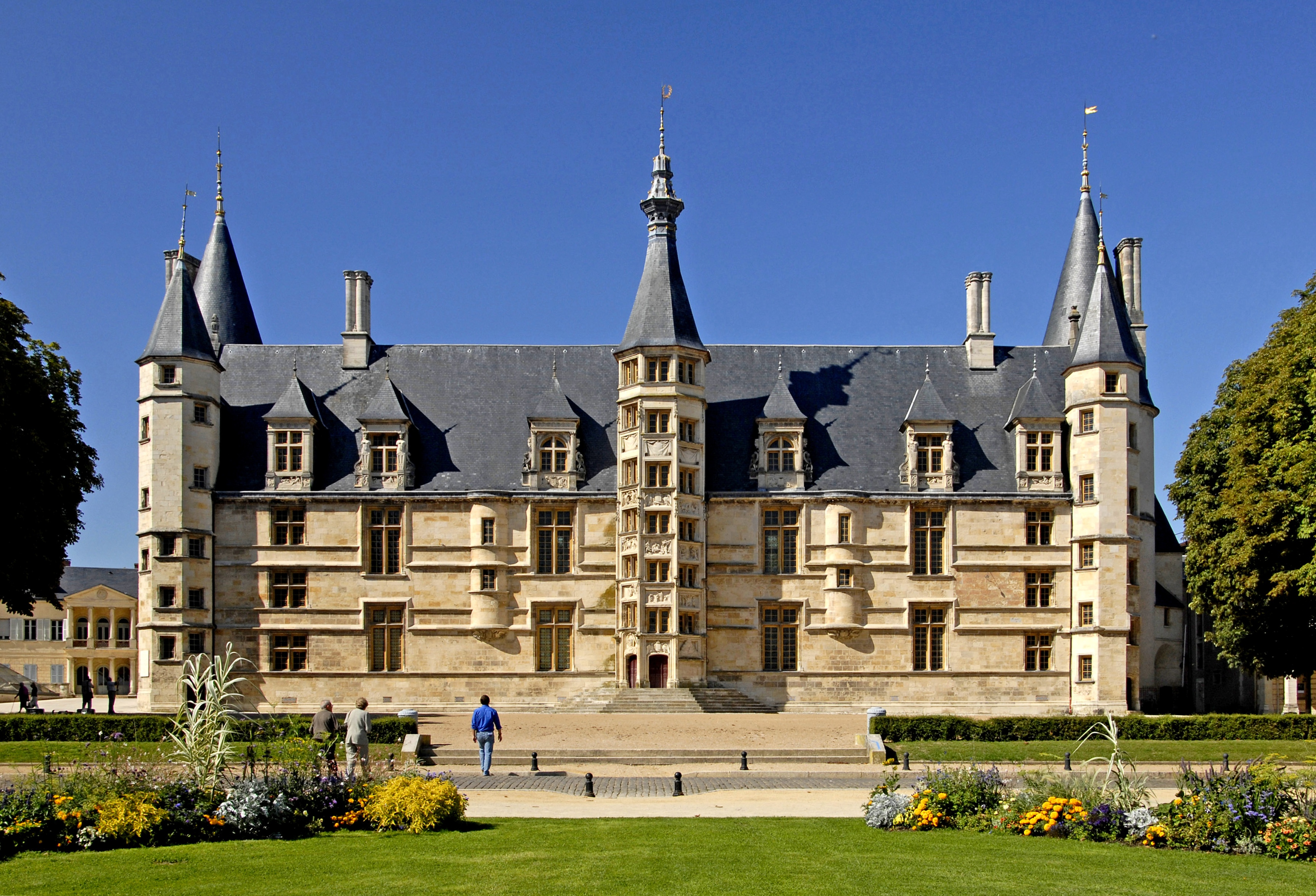
The Ducal Palace of Nevers

The Ducal Palace of Nevers (French: Palais ducal de Nevers) is a residence castle of the 15th and 16th centuries that once belonged to the counts and dukes of Nevers. Located in Nevers, France, it is classified as a French monument historique in the list of historic monuments of 1840.

== History ==
Considered as the first of the Loire castles with its wide Renaissance façade surrounded by polygon turrets, it was built on the hill overlooking the center of the old town, the Republic Square and a big park.

On the underground level, there is an avant-garde museum and a permanent exhibition representing the past and present life of Nevers.

This building was constructed for John Clamecy, Count of Nevers, in the place where his old fortress used to be. Two large back towers are known to be the oldest (15th century), as the Clèves family later in the 16th century rebuilt the castle by adding the splendid staircase which is situated in the central turret.

There are consistent proportions between the ocher facade and slate roofs. From the castle, the long tree-lined esplanade offering a panoramic view continues to stretch to the edges of the Loire.

Restored by the order of Pierre Bérégovoy in the 1980s, the palace now houses the town hall (including the Mayor's office and Council Chamber), part of the tourist office, exhibition halls, reception, a permanent exhibition on the history and advantages of the city (Formula One, earthenware, etc.), and an aquarium of Loire fish.

During the restoration excavations (mainly in 1988) which led to the discovery of many artillery fragments, beautiful pieces of 14th-century artillery were found ("powder chamber veuglaire"), which are based in an archaeological deposit in Nevers and are absolutely unique in France.

It was in front of the Ducal Palace that the President of the Republic François Mitterrand held his famous speech on May 4, 1993 about Pierre Bérégovoy, who had committed suicide on May 1: "All the reasons in the world cannot justify those people who could destroy the honor of a man, and finally his life at the price of a breach of fundamental laws of our Republic which protects the dignity and freedom of everyone of us".
