= Nevers =

Prefecture of the Nièvre department, Bourgogne-Franche-Comté, France

- Prefecture and commune
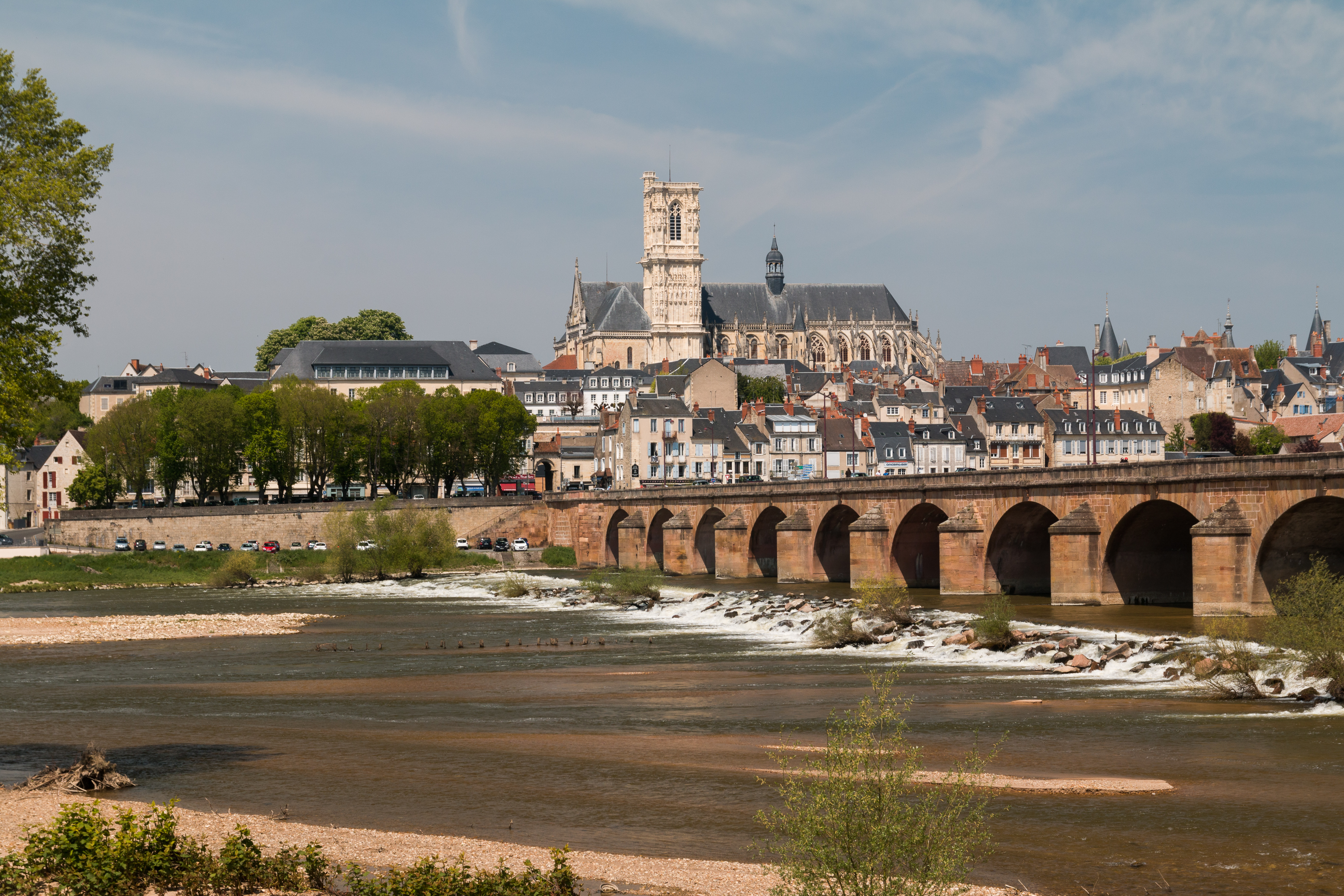
- The city seen from the left bank of the Loire with Nevers Cathedral in the background

- Coat of arms
- Location of Nevers
- Location within France Location within Bourgogne-Franche-Comté
- Coordinates: 46°59′36″N 3°09′26″E
- Country: France
- Region: Bourgogne-Franche-Comté
- Department: Nièvre
- Arrondissement: Nevers
- Canton: Nevers-1, 2, 3 and 4
- Intercommunality: CA Nevers

Government
  - Mayor (2020–2026): Denis Thuriot
- Area^{1}: 17.33 km^{2} (6.69 sq mi)
- Elevation: 180 m (590 ft)
- Highest elevation: 238 m (781 ft)
- Lowest elevation: 167 m (548 ft)
- Population (2023): 33,085
  - Density: 1,909/km^{2} (4,945/sq mi)
- Demonym(s): Neversois (masculine); Neversoise (feminine)
- Time zone: UTC+01:00 (CET)
  - Summer (DST): UTC+02:00 (CEST)
- INSEE/Postal code: 58194 /58000
- Website: www.nevers.fr
- ^{1} French Land Register data, which excludes lakes, ponds, glaciers > 1 km^{2} (0.386 sq mi or 247 acres) and river estuaries.

Nevers (/nəˈvɛər/ nə-VAIR, French: [nəvɛʁ]; Latin: Noviodunum, later Nevirnum and Nebirnum) is a city and the prefecture of the Nièvre department in the Bourgogne-Franche-Comté region in central France. It was the principal city of the former province of Nivernais. It is 260 km (160 mi) south-southeast of Paris.

== History ==
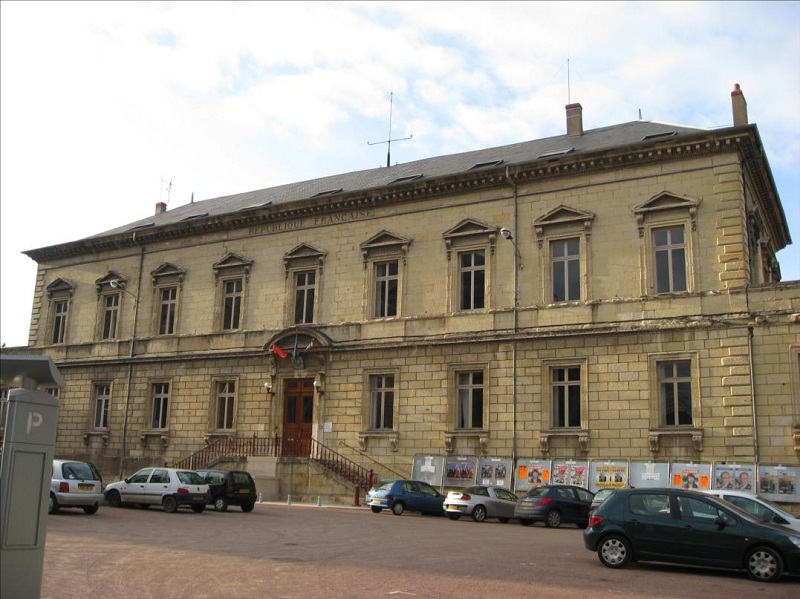
The Hôtel de Ville

Nevers first enters written history as Noviodunum, a town held by the Aedui at Roman contact. The quantities of medals and other Roman antiquities found on the site indicate its importance. In 52 BCE, Julius Caesar made Noviodunum, which he describes as a convenient position on the banks of the Loire, a depot (B. G. vii. 55). There, he had his hostages, corn and military chest, with the money in it allowed him from home for the war, his own and his army's baggage and a great number of horses which had been bought for him in Spain and Italy.

After his failure before Gergovia, the Aedui at Noviodunum massacred those who were there to look after stores, the negotiators and the travellers who were in the place. They divided the money and the horses among themselves, carried off in boats all the corn that they could and burned the rest or threw it into the river.

Thinking they could not hold the town, they burned it. That was a great loss to Caesar, and it may seem that he was imprudent in leaving such great stores in the power of treacherous allies. However, he was in straits that year, and probably he could not have done other than he did.

Dio Cassius (xl. 38) tells the story of Caesar out of the affair of Noviodunum. He states incorrectly what Caesar did on the occasion, and he shows that he neither understood his original nor knew what he was writing about.

The city was later called Nevirnum, as the name appears in the Antonine Itinerary. In the Tabula Peutingeriana, it is corrupted into Ebrinum. In still other sources the name appears as Nebirnum or Nivernum.

It became the seat of a bishopric at the end of the 5th century. The county dates at least from the beginning of the 10th century. The citizens of Nevers obtained charters in 1194 and 1231. For a short time in the 14th century the town was the seat of a university, transferred from Orléans, to which it was restored.

In 1565, the town became the seat of a branch of the Gonzaga family, who in 1627 succeeded to the Duchy of Mantua. This line of the Gonzaga Dukes of Nevers itself died out in 1708.

The Hôtel de Ville was completed in 1834.

During the Second World War, in July 1940, Nevers fell into the occupied zone. A major Allied bombardment of Nevers took place on July 16, 1944, causing 161 deaths and partially destroying Nevers Cathedral (Saint-Cyr-et-Sainte-Julitte). The Germans finally left the city on September 7, 1944.

In the 1970s, during the Trente Glorieuses (the post-war economic boom), Nevers reached the peak of its economic development.

In 1983, the Socialist Pierre Bérégovoy was elected mayor. During his term, major construction projects were launched (highway interchanges, shopping centers), with the city further benefiting from his national political influence.

After his death in 1993 the city experienced a progressive urban decline. Poorly connected (serving as a highway dead-end and lacking a TGV high-speed rail link), it was affected by a declining and aging population, a drop in real estate prices per square metre, housing becoming substandard and the closure of numerous businesses—a trend shared by a number of mid-sized cities in France. At the beginning of the 21st century initiatives were launched to try and halt this decline, notably via the government-backed Action cœur de ville (Heart of the City Action) project in 2018.

== Geography ==
Nevers is situated on the slope of a hill on the right bank of the river Loire.

== Climate ==
Nevers has an oceanic climate (Köppen Cfb) in spite of being far inland. In spite of moderate averages, temperatures are highly variable depending on weather patterns, with a temperature amplitude of 64.8 °C (116.6 °F) for its records since 1946. While summer nights frequently fall into the single digits, every month between April and October has reached 30 °C (86 °F) during the afternoon at some point.

Climate data for Nevers (1991–2020 averages), extremes since 1946
Month	Jan	Feb	Mar	Apr	May	Jun	Jul	Aug	Sep	Oct	Nov	Dec	Year
Record high °C (°F)	17.4 (63.3)	23.5 (74.3)	26.7 (80.1)	30.0 (86.0)	32.0 (89.6)	39.0 (102.2)	39.4 (102.9)	39.8 (103.6)	35.4 (95.7)	31.5 (88.7)	23.5 (74.3)	19.5 (67.1)	39.8 (103.6)
Mean daily maximum °C (°F)	7.3 (45.1)	8.8 (47.8)	13.2 (55.8)	16.4 (61.5)	20.1 (68.2)	23.8 (74.8)	26.0 (78.8)	26.1 (79.0)	21.9 (71.4)	17.1 (62.8)	11.1 (52.0)	7.8 (46.0)	16.6 (61.9)
Daily mean °C (°F)	3.9 (39.0)	4.5 (40.1)	7.6 (45.7)	10.3 (50.5)	14.0 (57.2)	17.6 (63.7)	19.6 (67.3)	19.4 (66.9)	15.5 (59.9)	12.1 (53.8)	7.3 (45.1)	4.5 (40.1)	11.4 (52.5)
Mean daily minimum °C (°F)	0.6 (33.1)	0.2 (32.4)	2.0 (35.6)	4.2 (39.6)	8.0 (46.4)	11.4 (52.5)	13.1 (55.6)	12.7 (54.9)	9.1 (48.4)	7.1 (44.8)	3.4 (38.1)	1.2 (34.2)	6.1 (43.0)
Record low °C (°F)	−25.0 (−13.0)	−21.8 (−7.2)	−13.8 (7.2)	−7.5 (18.5)	−4.8 (23.4)	0.2 (32.4)	3.4 (38.1)	0.3 (32.5)	−1.2 (29.8)	−8.9 (16.0)	−12.3 (9.9)	−16.8 (1.8)	−25.0 (−13.0)
Average precipitation mm (inches)	63.0 (2.48)	55.2 (2.17)	52.6 (2.07)	68.8 (2.71)	73.2 (2.88)	61.8 (2.43)	58.1 (2.29)	61.7 (2.43)	63.5 (2.50)	74.4 (2.93)	75.4 (2.97)	75.8 (2.98)	783.5 (30.85)
Average precipitation days (≥ 1.0 mm)	12.2	10.1	9.8	10.5	10.7	8.9	8.8	8.1	8.2	10.9	11.9	12.2	122.3
Average relative humidity (%)	87	82	78	74	77	76	74	77	80	85	87	87	80.3
Mean monthly sunshine hours	63.4	91.3	154.1	180.9	205.3	225.5	245.3	235.5	189.2	122.9	71.6	58.9	1,843.9
Source 1: Météo France
Source 2: Infoclimat.fr (humidity, 1961–1990)

== Main sights ==
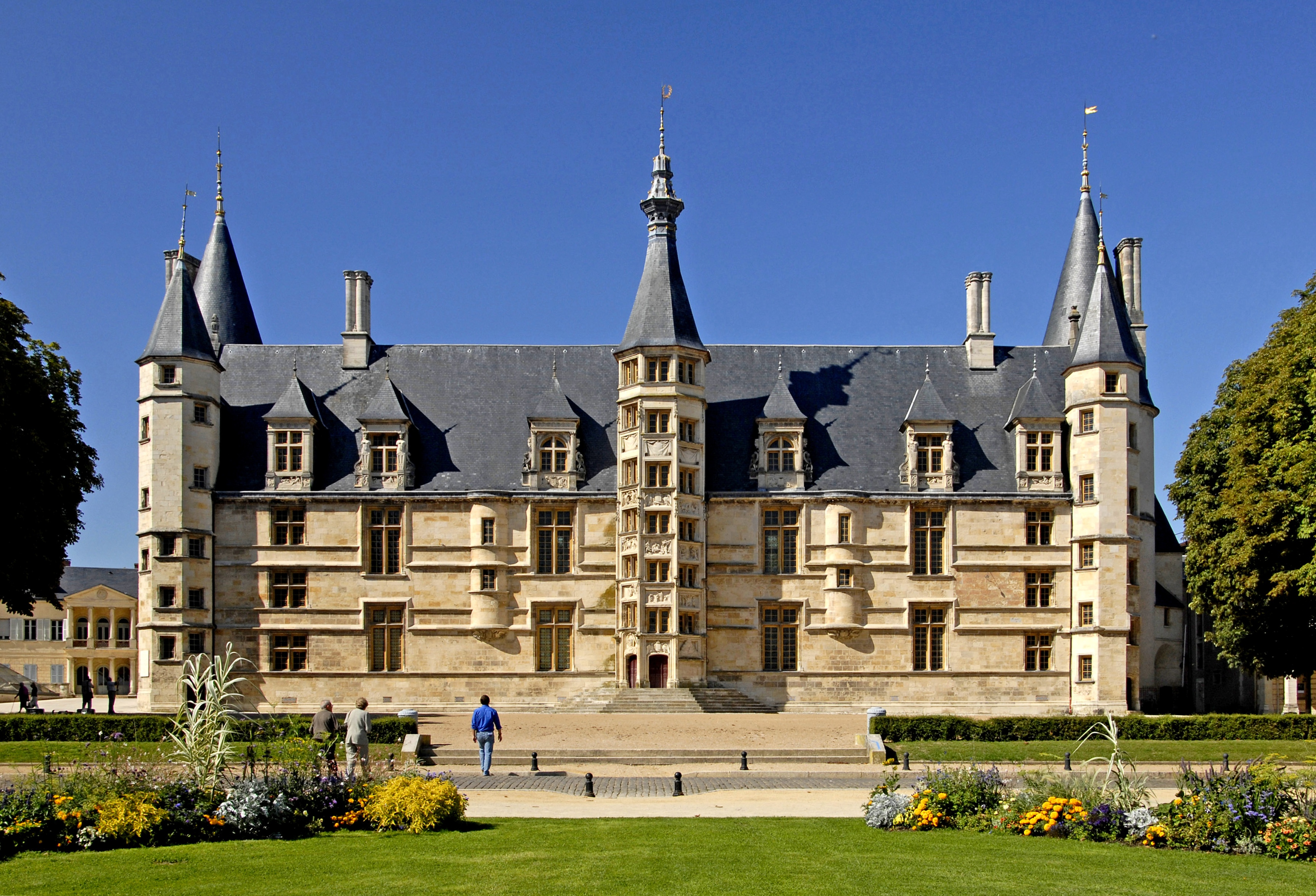
The Ducal Palace of Nevers, in France

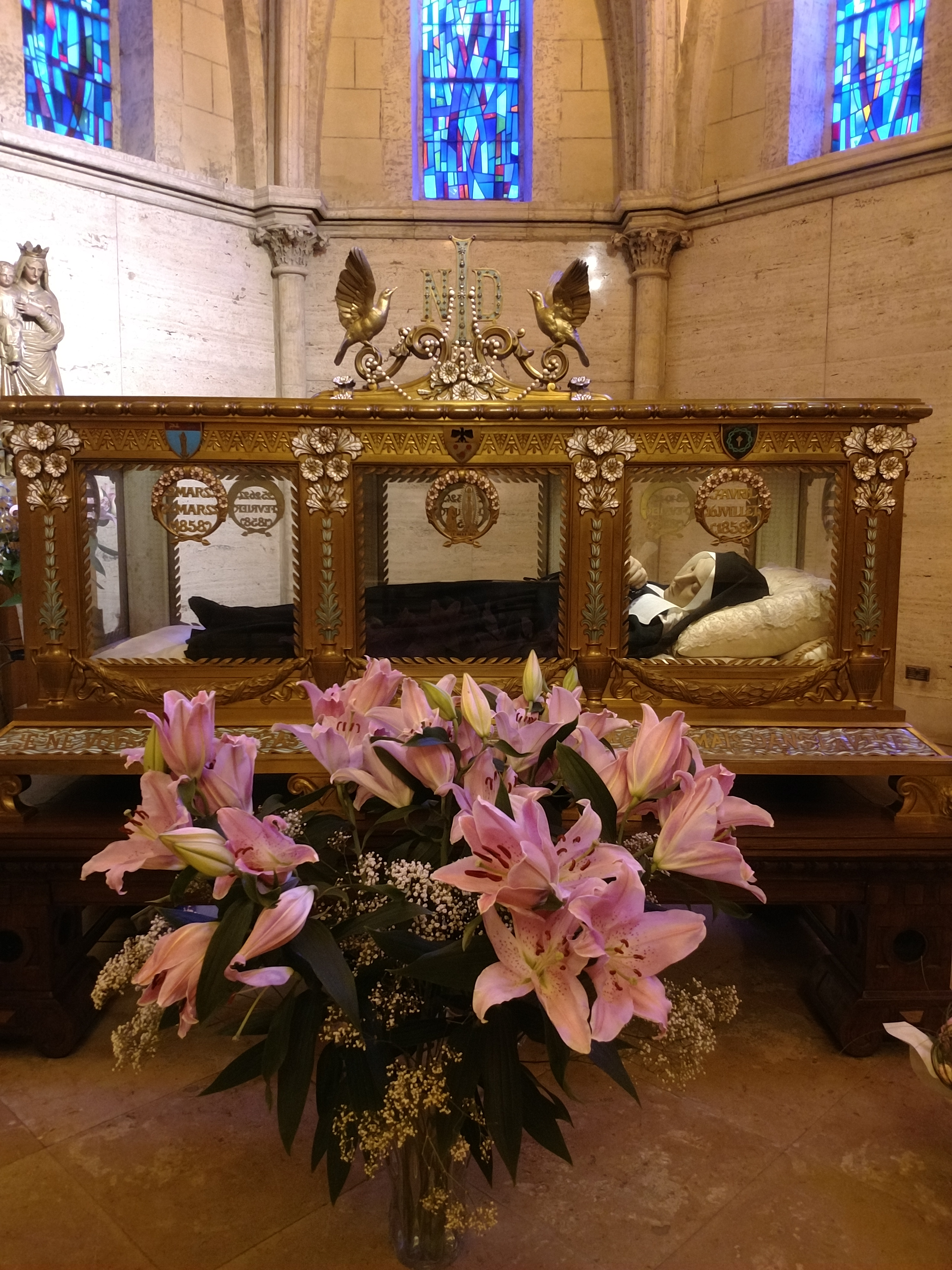
The incorrupt body of Saint Bernadette, seer of Our Lady of Lourdes apparitions

Narrow winding streets lead from the quay through the town where there are numerous old houses dating from the 14th to the 17th century.

Among the ecclesiastical buildings the most important is the Cathédrale of Saint Cyr-Sainte Julitte, dedicated to Saint Quiricus and Saint Julietta, which is a combination of two buildings, and possesses two apses. The apse and transept at the west end are the remains of a Romanesque church, while the nave and eastern apse are in the Gothic style and belong to the 14th century. There is no transept at the eastern end. The lateral portal on the south side belongs to the late 15th century; the massive and elaborately decorated tower which rises beside it dates to the early 16th century.

The church of Saint Étienne is a specimen of the Romanesque style of Auvergne of which the disposition of the apse with its three radiating chapels is characteristic. It was consecrated at the close of the 9th century, and belonged to a priory affiliated to Cluny.

The Ducal Palace (now occupied by the courts of justice and an important ceramic museum) was built in the 15th and 16th centuries and is one of the principal feudal edifices in central France. The façade is flanked at each end by a turret and a round tower. A middle tower containing the great staircase has its windows adorned by sculptures relating to the history of the House of La Marck by the members of which the greater part of the palace was built.

Behind the palace lies an open space with a fine view over the Loire Valley. The Porte du Croux, a square tower, with corner turrets, dating from the end of the 14th century, is among the remnants of the old fortifications; it now contains a collection of sculptures and Roman antiquities.

A triumphal arch from the 18th century, commemorating the victory of Fontenoy and the hôtel de ville, a 19th-century building which contains the library, are of some interest. The Loire is crossed by a modern stone bridge, and by an iron railway bridge.

At the Chapel of Saint Bernadette at the mother house of the Sisters of Charity of Nevers, it is possible to view the incorrupt body of Saint Bernadette Soubirous, the famous seer of Our Lady of Lourdes apparitions, which are presented in a gold and crystal reliquary.

== Economy ==
Nevers is the seat of a bishopric, of tribunals of first instance and of commerce and of a cour d'assises and has a chamber of commerce and a branch of the Bank of France. Its educational institutions include several lycées, a training college for female teachers, ecclesiastical seminaries, a school of art (Esaab) and an automotive and transports engineering school (Institut supérieur de l'automobile et des transports) being part of the University of Burgundy. The town manufactures porcelain, agricultural implements, chemical manures, glue, boilers and iron goods, boots and shoes and fur garments, and has distilleries, tanneries and dye works. Its trade is in iron and steel, wood, wine, grain, livestock, etc. hydraulic lime, kaolin and clay for the manufacture of faience are worked in the vicinity.

The Rossignol Skis Group produces 89% of its Look Brand alpine ski bindings in Nevers.

=== Transport ===
Nevers railway station offers connections to Paris, Dijon, Lyon, Clermont-Ferrand and several regional destinations. The A77 motorway connects Nevers with Paris. The nearest airports are Clermont-Ferrand Auvergne Airport, located 181 km (112 mi) south and Lyon–Saint-Exupéry Airport, located 278 km (173 mi) south east.

== Population ==
Historical population

Year	Pop.	±% p.a.
1793	11,846	—
1800	11,200	−0.80%
1806	12,077	+1.26%
1821	12,280	+0.11%
1831	15,085	+2.08%
1836	16,967	+2.38%
1841	15,007	−2.43%
1846	16,721	+2.19%
1851	17,045	+0.38%
1856	18,182	+1.30%
1861	18,971	+0.85%
1866	20,700	+1.76%
1872	22,276	+1.23%
1876	22,704	+0.48%
1881	23,846	+0.99%
1886	25,006	+0.95%
1891	26,436	+1.12%
1896	27,108	+0.50%
1901	27,673	+0.41%

Year	Pop.	±% p.a.
1906	27,030	−0.47%
1911	27,706	+0.50%
1921	29,754	+0.72%
1926	29,306	−0.30%
1931	31,879	+1.70%
1936	33,699	+1.12%
1946	34,036	+0.10%
1954	35,183	+0.42%
1962	39,085	+1.32%
1968	42,422	+1.37%
1975	45,480	+1.00%
1982	43,013	−0.79%
1990	41,968	−0.31%
1999	40,932	−0.28%
2007	38,007	−0.92%
2012	35,327	−1.45%
2017	32,990	−1.36%
2023	33,085	+0.05%

Source: EHESS and INSEE (1968–2023)

== Notable people ==
- Roselyne Bachelot, French politician and former Minister of Culture, born in Nevers in 1946
- Valérie Beauvais, politician, born in Nevers in 1963
- Pierre Bérégovoy, former Prime Minister of France, committed suicide in 1993 in Nevers
- Pierre Gaspard Chaumette, revolutionary, born in Nevers in 1763
- Da Silva, singer-songwriter, born in Nevers in 1976
- Marie Louise Gonzaga, Queen of Poland, born in Nevers in 1611
- Honoré Jacquinot (1815–1887), surgeon and zoologist, died in Nevers
- Marie Casimire Louise de La Grange d'Arquien, Queen of Poland, born in Nevers in 1641
- Parfait Mandanda, footballer, born in Nevers in 1989
- Félix Maritaud, actor, born in Nevers in 1992
- Alexandre Oukidja, Algerian professional footballer, born in Nevers in 1988
- Anne Boutiaut, born in Nevers in 1851 and later known as La Mère Poulard in Mont St-Michel
- Guy Savoy, French chef, born in Nevers in 1953
- Bernadette Soubirous, better known as Saint Bernadette of Lourdes, died in Nevers in 1879 (aged 35).
- Mamignan Touré, WNBA player, born in Nevers in 1994
- Jean Vieuchange, editor of Michel Vieuchange's travel notebooks, born in Nevers in 1906
- Michel Vieuchange, Saharan explorer, adventurer and writer, born in Nevers in 1904, where there is a street named after him

== Culture ==
Nevers has been known for several centuries for its Nevers faience.

The Formula One circuit of Magny-Cours is located near Nevers, as well as the museum Conservatoire de la monoplace française.

The anonymous French woman (played by Emmanuelle Riva) who is the main character in the film Hiroshima mon amour by Alain Resnais is from Nevers, and the film features many flashbacks to her youth there during World War II. In the final scene of the film, her Japanese lover tells her "You are Nevers". There is a lot of play on the English translation of the town's name throughout the film, with dialogue such as "Nevers ? Jamais !" ("Nevers? Never!")

Most of the scenes in the film Rosalie Blum were filmed in Nevers between March and April 2015, with the exception of the end scenes, which were filmed at Leffrinckoucke in the Nord.

Nevers is also the setting of most of the second half of Éric Rohmer's 1992 film, Conte d'Hiver.

== International relations ==
Nevers is twinned with:

- Koblenz, Germany
- Erzsébetváros (Budapest), Hungary
- Mantua, Italy
- St Albans, England, United Kingdom
- Lund, Sweden
- Stavroupoli, Greece
- Curtea de Argeș, Romania
- Taizhou, China
- Charleville-Mézières, France
- Hammamet, Tunisia
- Neubrandenburg, Germany

== See also ==
- Wine barrels
- Communes of the Nièvre department
