= TER Auvergne =

Overview
- Website: http://www.sncf.com/en/trains/ter

Technical
- Track gauge: 1,435 mm (4 ft 8 1/2 in) standard gauge

TER Auvergne was the regional rail network serving Auvergne région, France. In 2017 it was merged into the new TER Auvergne-Rhône-Alpes.

== Network ==
=== Rail ===
Line	Route	Frequency	Notes
1 (3)	(Nevers – ... -) Moulins-sur-Allier – Bessay† – Varennes-sur-Allier – Saint-Germain-des-Fossés – Vichy – Riom-Châtel-Guyon – Clermont-Ferrand (- ... – Vic-le-Comte)	15× per day + 7× Intercités	
2	Clermont-Ferrand ... Vichy ... Roanne ... Lyon-Perrache (see TER Rhône-Alpes line 24 for details)		
6	Clermont-Ferrand ... Thiers ... Saint-Étienne (see TER Rhône-Alpes line 11 for details)		
8 (29)	Clermont-Ferrand – Clermont-La Rotonde – Royat-Chamalières – Durtol-Nohanent† – Volvic ... Laqueuille – La Bourboule – Le Mont-Dore (see TER Limousin lines 8 and 11 for details of the branch lines from Laqueuille to Limoges and Brive-la-Gaillarde)		
9	Montluçon ... Commentry ... Gannat – Aigueperse – Aubiat† – Pontmort† – Riom-Châtel-Guyon – Gerzat† – Clermont-Ferrand		
10	Bourges ... Montluçon (see TER Centre line 36 for details)		
12	Moulins-sur-Allier ... Lyon-Perrache		
14	Clermont-Ferrand ... Issoire ... Neussargues ... Aurillac		
15	Toulouse-Matabiau – Aurillac (see TER Midi-Pyrénées line 3 for details)		
21	Brive-la-Gaillarde – Turenne† – Les Quatre Routes† – Saint-Denis-près-Martel – Vayrac† – Bétaille† – Puybrun† – Bretenoux-Biars – Laval-de-Cère – Lamativie† – Laroquebrou – Aurillac	4× per day	
22	Le Puy-en-Velay ... Bas-Monistrol ... Saint-Étienne ... Lyon-Perrache (see TER Rhône-Alpes line 10 for details)		
24 (4, 5, 23)	Clermont-Ferrand – Clermont-La Pardieu – Sarliève-Cournon† – Le Cendre-Orcet – Les Martres-de-Veyre† – Vic-le-Comte† – Parent-Coudes-Champeix† – Issoire ... Brioude ... Le Puy-en-Velay		
30	Clermont-Ferrand ... Brioude ... Langeac ... Alès ... Nîmes (see TER Languedoc-Roussillon line 9 for details)		
34	Moulins-sur-Allier ... Paray-le-Monial ... Lyon-Perrache (see TER Bourgogne line 7 for details)		
† Not all trains call at this station

=== Bus ===
- Arlanc – Ambert – Thiers – Vichy
- Neussargues – Riom-ès-Montagnes – Bort-les-Orgues
- Clermont-Ferrand – Bort-les-Orgues – Mauriac – Saint-Martin-Valmeroux
- Aurillac – Mauriac – Bort-les-Orgues
- Le Puy-en-Velay – La Chaise-Dieu – Ambert
- Dunières – Firminy
- Le Puy-en-Velay – Langogne – Mende
- Bort-les-Orgues – Ussel
- Montluçon – Ussel
- Montluçon – Saint-Éloy-les-Mines – Clermont-Ferrand

== Rolling stock ==
=== Multiple units ===
- SNCF Class X 2100
- SNCF Class X 2800
- SNCF Class X 4300
- SNCF Class X 4500
- SNCF Class X 4630
- SNCF Class X 4750
- SNCF Class X 72500
- SNCF Class X 73500
- SNCF Class X 76500 (XGC X 76500)

On order:

- SNCF Class Z 27500 (ZGC Z 27500)

=== Locomotives ===
- SNCF Class BB 67400

== See also ==
- SNCF
- Transport express régional
- Réseau Ferré de France
- List of SNCF stations
- List of SNCF stations in Auvergne
- Auvergne (region)
