= A TER =

Family of French diesel multiple unit trains

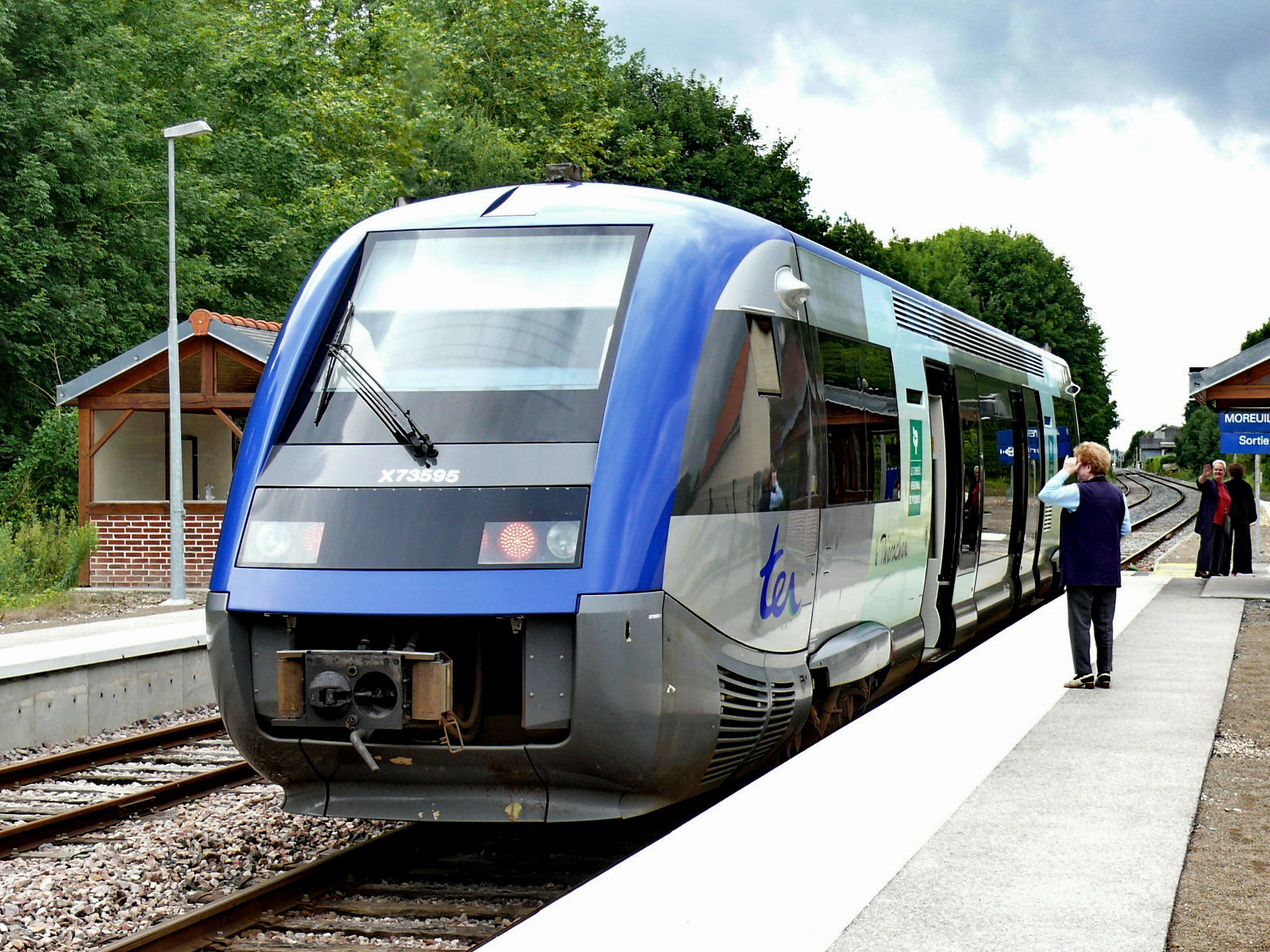
- X 73595 at Moreuil station in 2008.
- Stock type: Diesel multiple unit
- In service: 1999–
- Manufacturer: Alstom
- Built at: Reichshoffen, France; Salzgitter, Germany
- Family name: Alstom Coradia
- Constructed: 1999–2004
- Entered service: 1999
- Number built: X73500: 312; X73900: 19; CFL2100: 6; DB641: 40; Total: 377
- Capacity: SNCF: 61 (seated); 17 (standing); DB: 55 standard; 8 first; 17 tip seats
- Operators: Current: SNCF, DB; Former: CFL

Specifications
- Train length: 28.9 m (94 ft 10 in)
- Width: 2.9 m (9 ft 6 in)
- Height: 3.7 m (12 ft 2 in)
- Floor height: 550 mm (22 in)
- Entry: level
- Maximum speed: X73500: 140 km/h (87 mph); X73900, DB 641: 120 km/h (75 mph)
- Weight: 47.95 long tons (48.72 t)
- Prime mover: MAN D 2866
- Engine type: 6-cylinder diesel
- Cylinder count: 2
- Power output: 514 kW (689 hp)
- UIC classification: (1A)(A1)
- Coupling system: Scharfenberg
- Track gauge: 1,435 mm (4 ft 8 1/2 in) standard gauge

The A TER or A-TER is a family of diesel multiple unit (DMU) trains operated by Société nationale des chemins de fer français (SNCF) for Transport express régional (TER) regional train services in France, and by Deutsche Bahn for regional train services in Germany. 377 units were built between 1999 and 2004 by Alstom. There are three classes: Class X 73500, Class X 73900, and DBAG Class 641.

== General information ==
The trains are single-unit railcars. The units were ordered jointly with Deutsche Bahn, with their Class 641 units. They are powered by two MAN engines and have a top speed of 140 kilometres per hour (87 mph).

The trains have modern features which were new to TER trains, such as:

- Passenger information systems (PIS) inside and outside of the train
- Low floor section with wide doors, for those with restricted mobility
- Air conditioning
- Stronger cab area for reduced crash damage

The trains can work in a group of up to 3 sets, but passengers cannot move between the units.

X73813 - X73818 are former CFL (Luxembourg) units 2101 - 2106 and operate in the Alsace region.

== Class X 73500 ==
SNCF Class X 73500 are the most numerous class of A TER trains.

The units can have one of several liveries:

- TER livery - metallic grey with blue ends and TER logos. Most X 73500 carry this.
- TER Bourgogne livery - metallic grey with red and yellow ends
- TER Languedoc-Roussillon livery - metallic grey with red, yellow sun rays.
- TER Champagne-Ardennes livery - metallic grey with yellow on the central part and the logo of the region.
- X 73744 and X 73751 wear a special livery for the Andelot-en-Montagne - La Cluse railway
- X 73752 - X 73755 have been fitted with Integra-Signum (Swiss Train Protection) and are used on the Besançon - Le Locle - La Chaux-de-Fonds service.
- X 73809 with Poitou-Charentes region has been fitted with solar panels to its roof to power the electrical components of the train

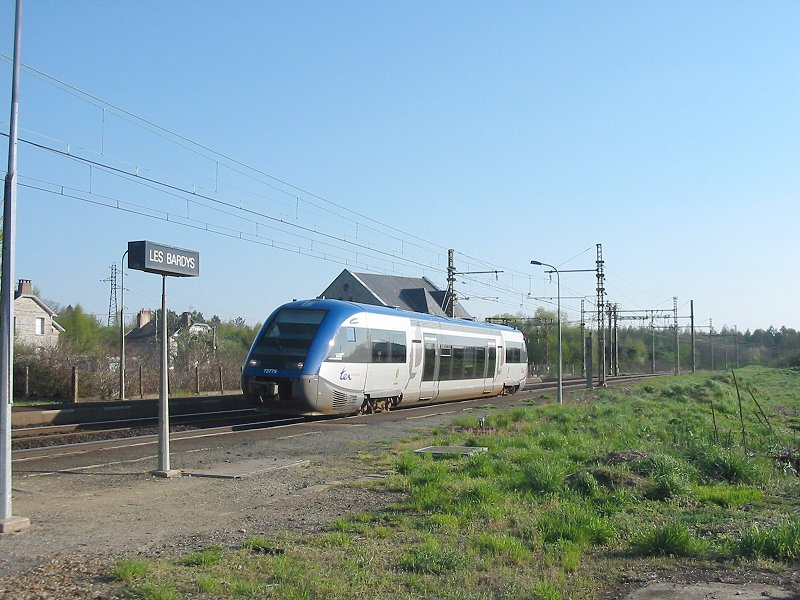
An X73500 arrives at Les Bardys

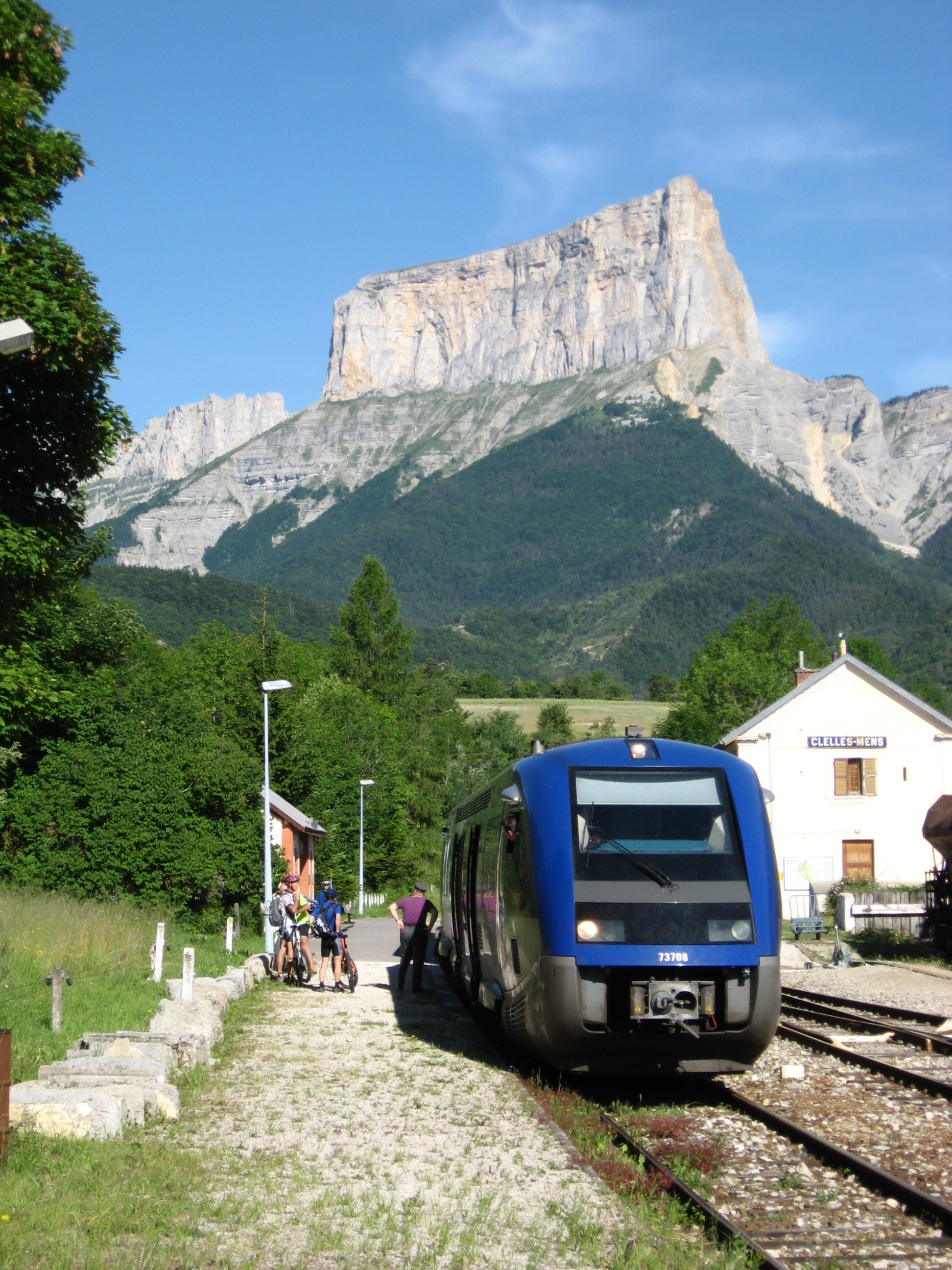
An X73500 at Clelles-Mens

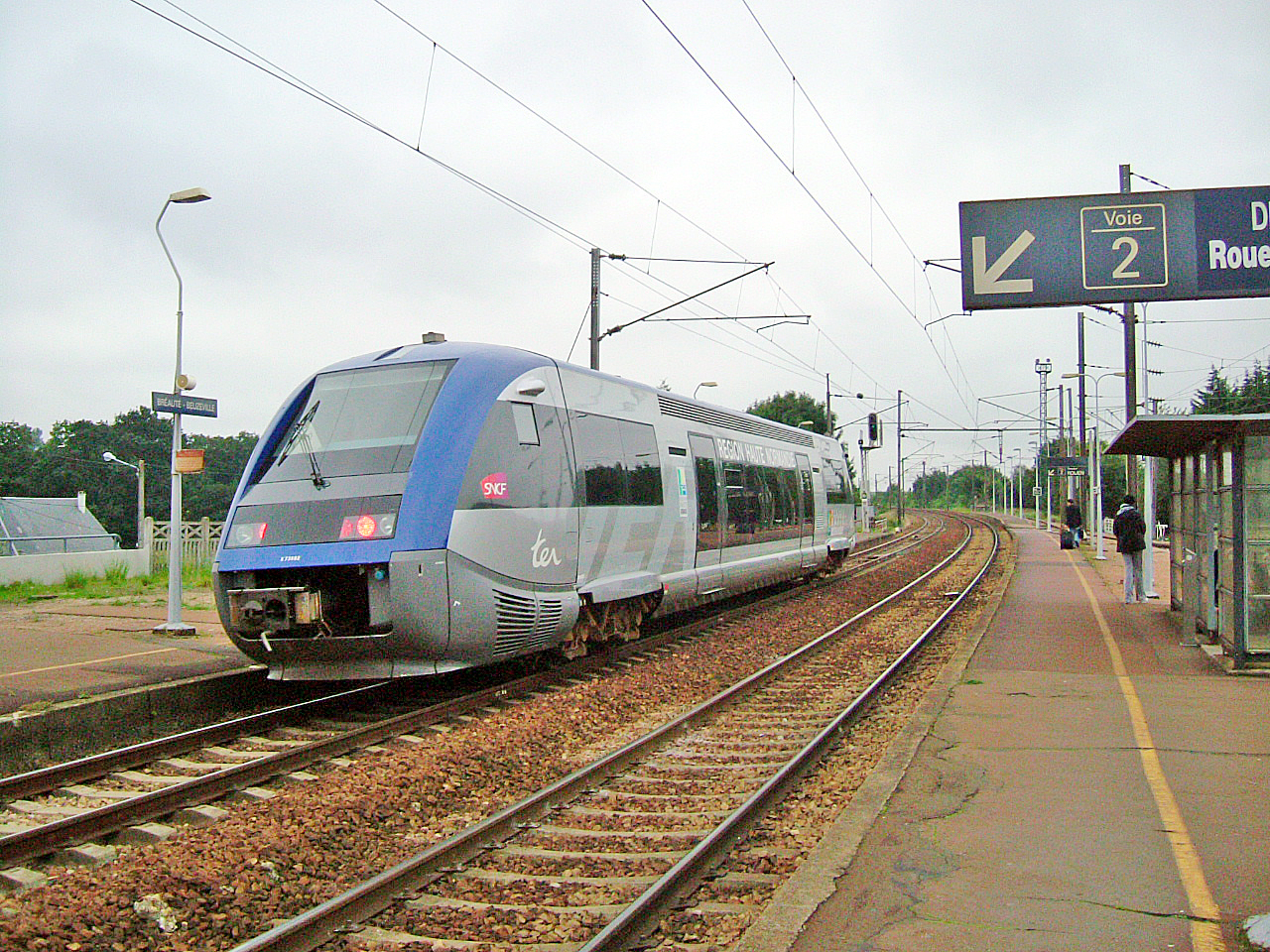
An X73500 at Bréauté-Beuzeville

The units are used on rural, unelectrified railway lines in France and are operated by all TER regions except Île-de-France, Corsica and Provence-Alpes-Côte d'Azur.

They operate the following services (this list does not include all services):

- Bourges - Nevers
- Chartres - Courtalain — Saint-Pellerin
- Reims - Tergnier
- Saint-Etienne - Le Puy
- Saint-Marcellin - Grenoble - Chambéry (via the Grenoble–Montmélian railway)
- Grenoble - Chambéry - Bellegarde - Genève (stand in for faulty X 72500)
- Grenoble - Veynes - Gap
- Grenoble - Clelles
- Toulouse - Auch
- Toulouse - Figeac - Aurillac
- Aurillac - Brive-la-Gaillarde
- Rodez - Figeac - Brive-la-Gaillarde
- Nantes - Vertou
- Sarreguemines - Sarre-Union
- Strasbourg - Wissembourg
- Strasbourg - Lauterbourg
- Strasbourg - Saverne
- Colmar - Munster - Metzeral
- Tours - Chinon
- Besançon - La Chaux-de-Fonds
- Dole - Morez - Saint Claude
- Montbéliard - Belfort - Lure - Vesoul
- Beauvais - Le Tréport-Mers
- Clermont-Ferrand - Gannat - Lapeyrouse - Commentary - Montluçon
- Montluçon - Saint-Amand-Montrond - Bourges
- Bressuire - Thouars - Saumur - Tours
- Mulhouse - Thann - Kruth
- Lison - Saint-Lô - Coutances
- Granville - Argentan
- Limoges - Ussel
- Marvejols - La Bastide-Saint-Laurent-les-Bains
- Monsempron-Libos - Penne-d'Agenais - Agen
- Étang-sur-Arroux - Autun - Avallon - Auxerre - Laroche-Migennes
- Corbigny - Clamecy - Auxerre - Laroche-Migennes
- Brest - Châteaulin - Quimper
- Brest - Le Relecq-Kerhuon - Landerneau
- Brest - Landerneau - Morlaix
- Brest - Landerneau - Landivisiau
- Quimper - Lorient
- Roscoff - Morlaix
- Nantes - Sainte-Pazanne - Saint-Gilles-Croix-de-Vie
- Nantes - Sainte Pazanne - Pornic
- Nantes - Vertou
- Saint-Brieuc - Dinan
- Dol de Bretagne - Dinan
- Plouaret - Lannion
- Le Mans - Alençon
- Nevers - Cosne sur Loire
- Lyon - Tassin - Lozanne / Brignais / Sain-Bel
- Lisieux - Pont-l'Eveque - Trouville-Deauville
- Dijon - Moulins
- Alès - Bessèges
- La Rochelle - Rochefort
- Pau - Oloron
- Carcassonne - Limoux - Quillan
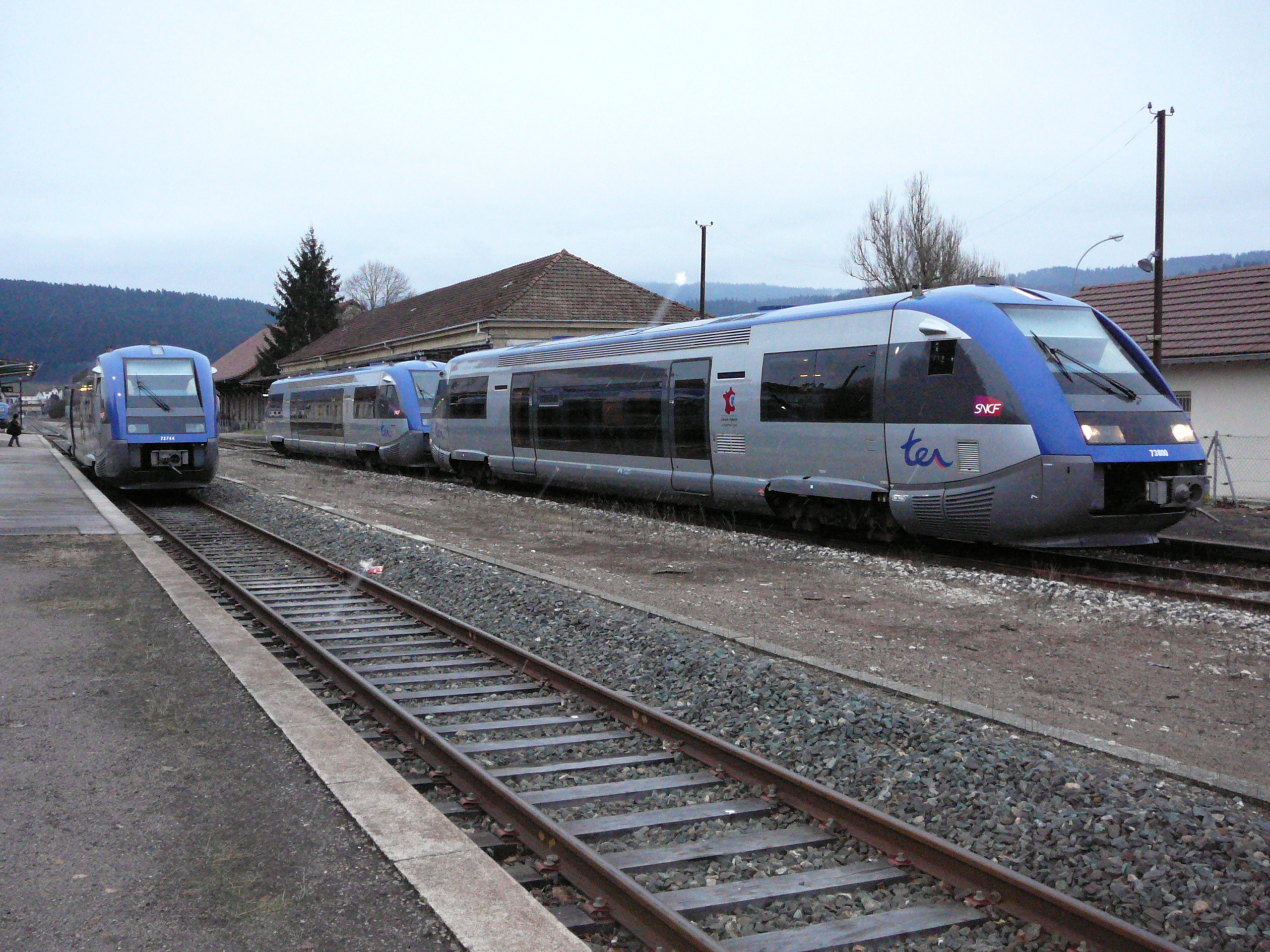
Two Class X73500 passing each other at Morteau

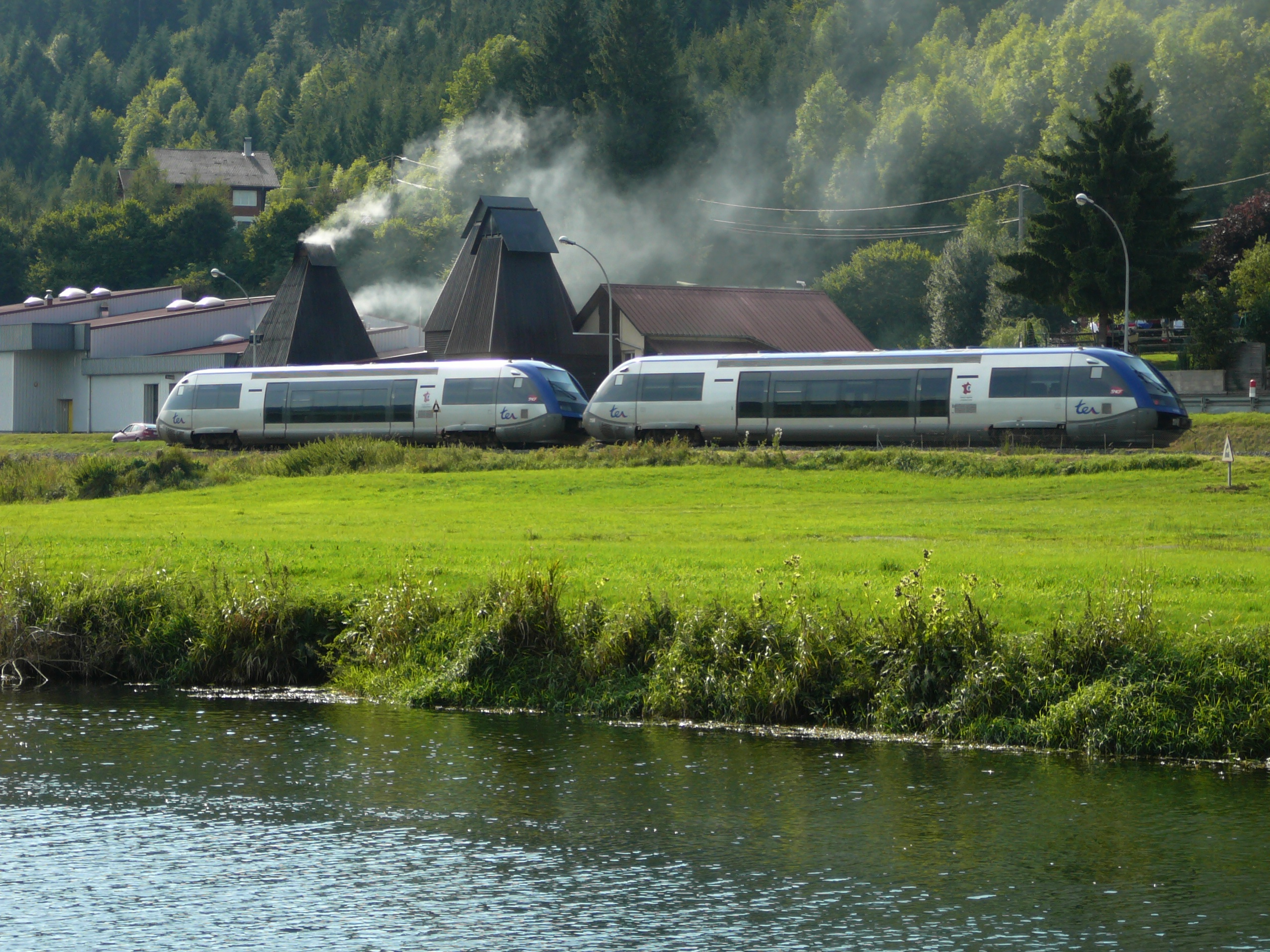
Two Class X73500 approaching Morteau

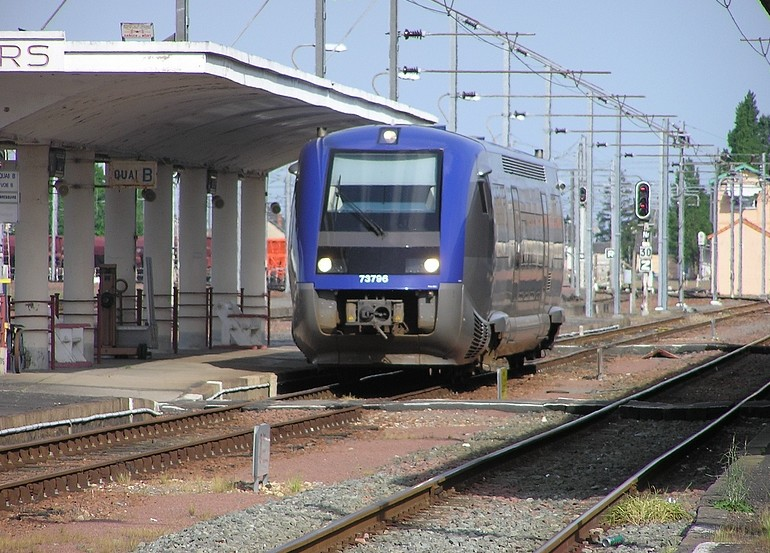
X73796

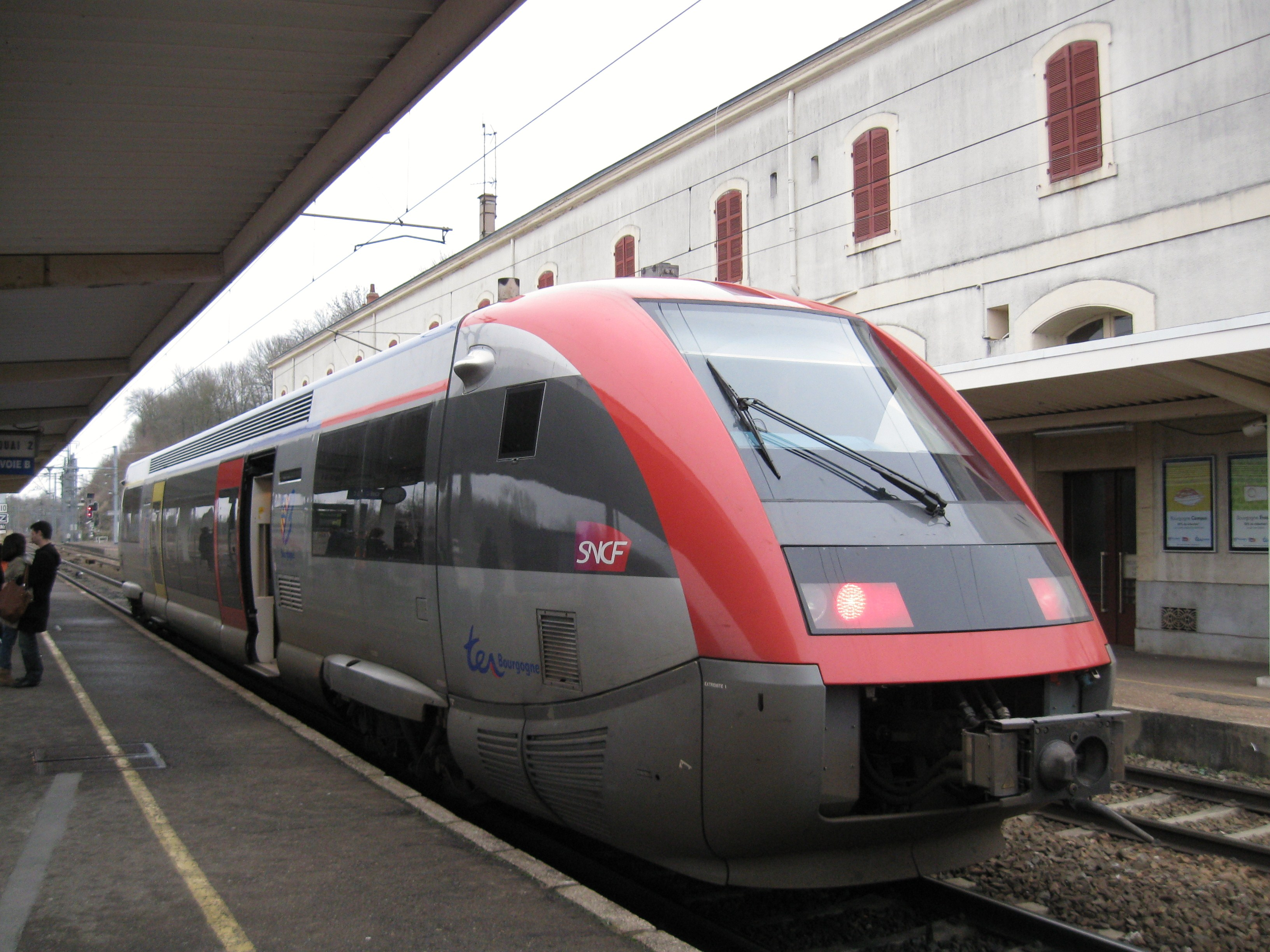
A TER Bourgogne set at Saincaize

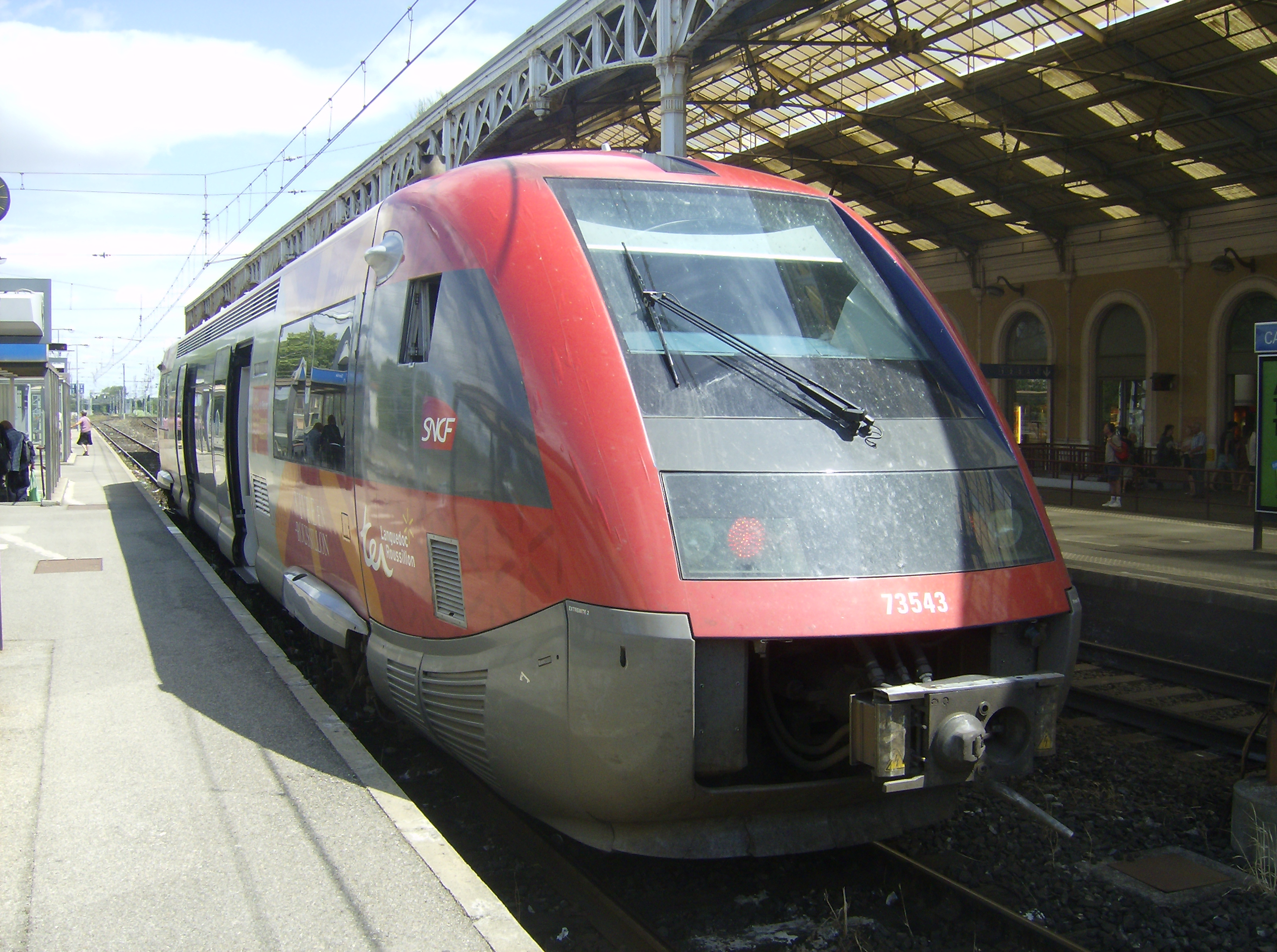
A TER Languedoc-Roussillon set at Carcassonne

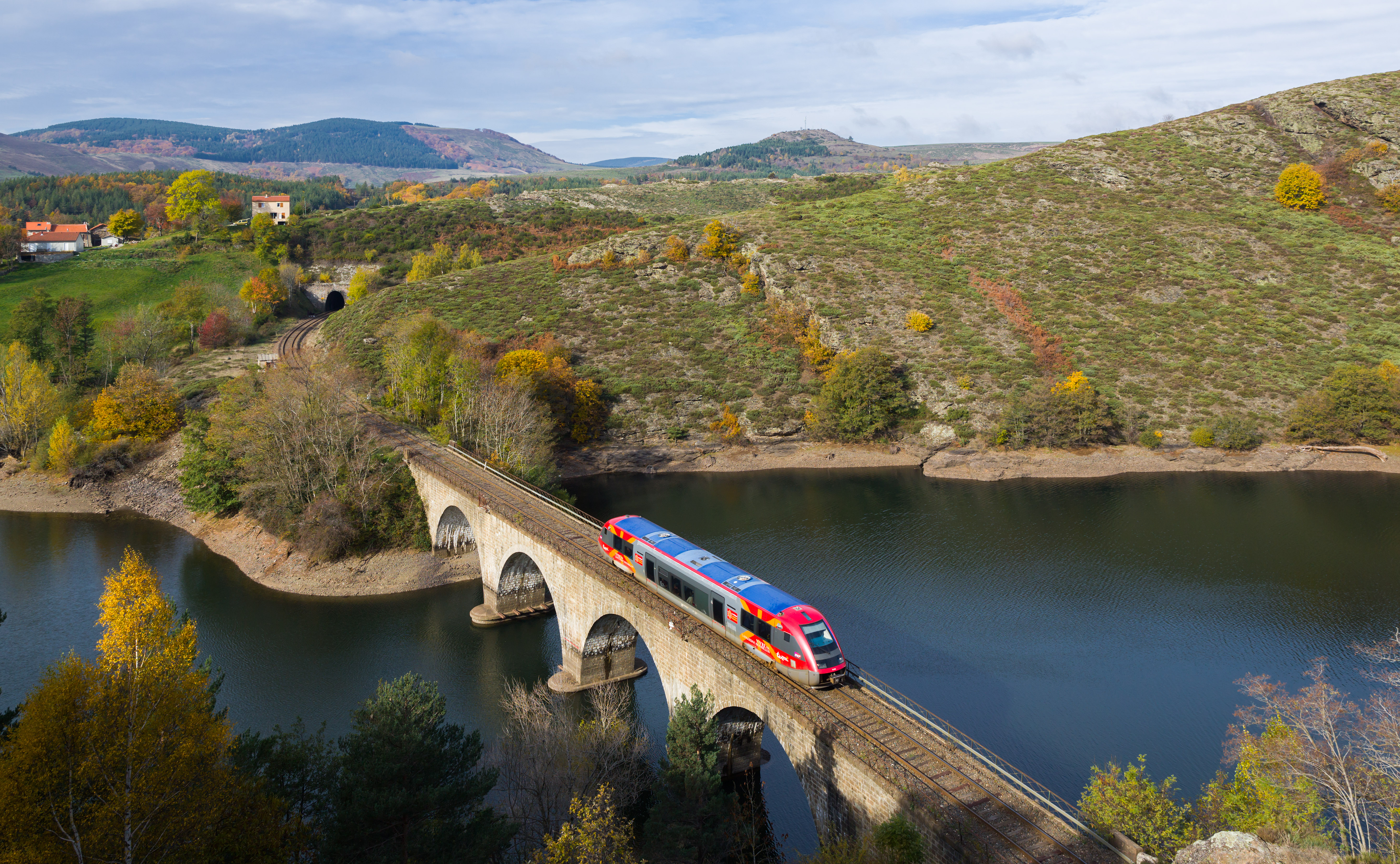
A X73500 on the Ligne des Cévennes.

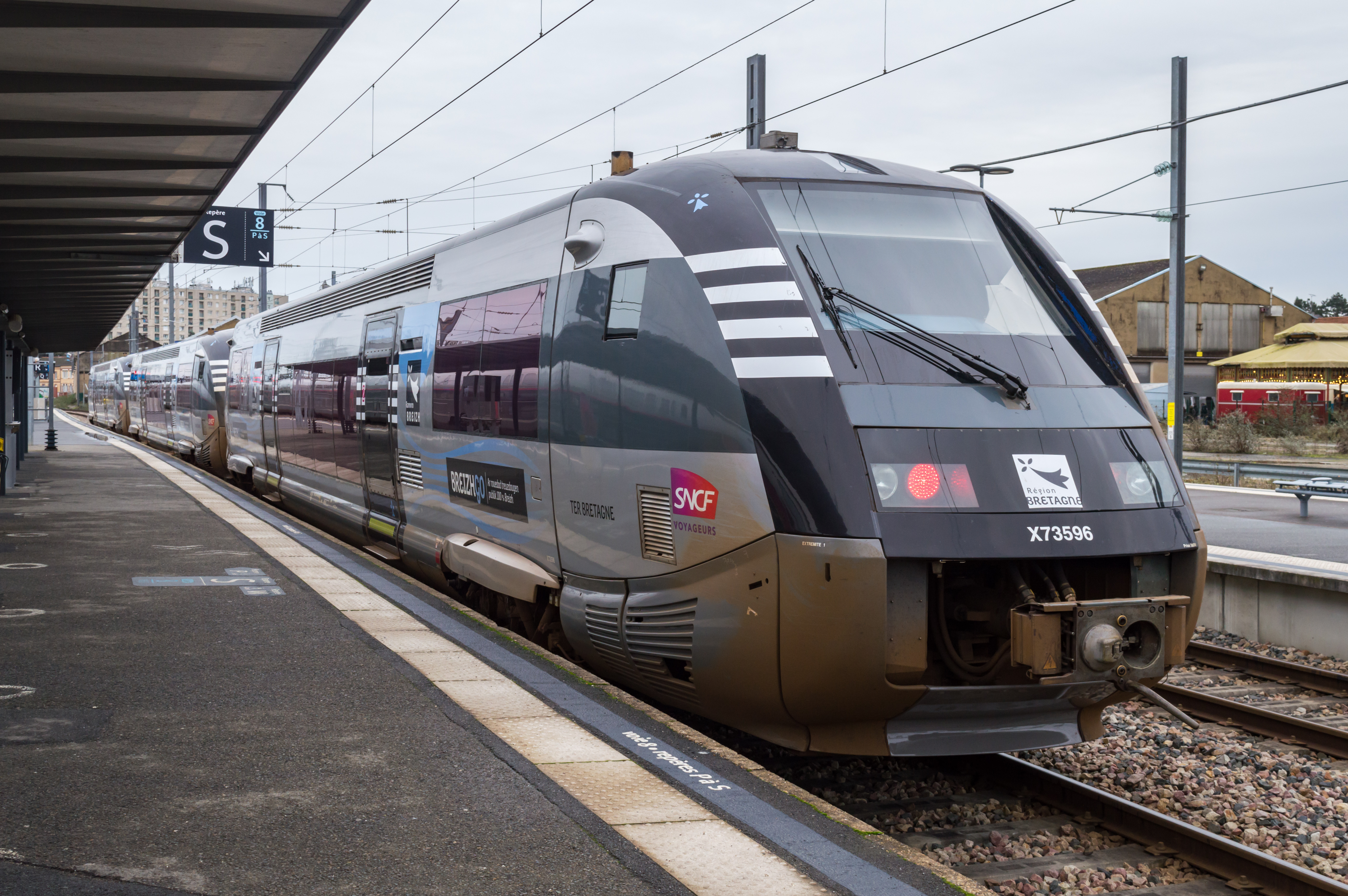
Three X73500 units of TER Bretagne at Rennes

== Depots ==
- TER Alsace - Strasbourg - 24 Railcars
- TER Aquitaine - Limoges - 15 Railcars
- TER Auvergne - Clermont-Ferrand - 35 Railcars
- TER Basse-Normandie - Caen - 11 Railcars
- TER Bourgogne - Nevers - 10 Railcars
- TER Bretagne - Rennes - 15 Railcars
- TER Centre - Tours - 15 Railcars
- TER Champagne-Ardenne - Epernay - 20 Railcars
- TER Franche-Comté - Dijon - 20 Railcars
- TER Haute-Normandie - Sotteville-les-Rouen - 11 Railcars
- TER Languedoc-Roussillon - Toulouse - 9 Railcars
- TER Limousin - Limoges - 15 Railcars
- TER Lorraine - Metz - 6 Railcars
- TER Midi-Pyrénées - Toulouse - 28 Railcars
- TER Nord-Pas-de-Calais - Lille - 10 Railcars
- TER Pays de la Loire - Nantes - 17 Railcars
- TER Picardie - Longueau - 12 Railcars
- TER Poitou-Charentes - Limoges - 8 Railcars
- TER Rhône-Alpes - Lyon - 50 Railcars

== Class X 73900 ==
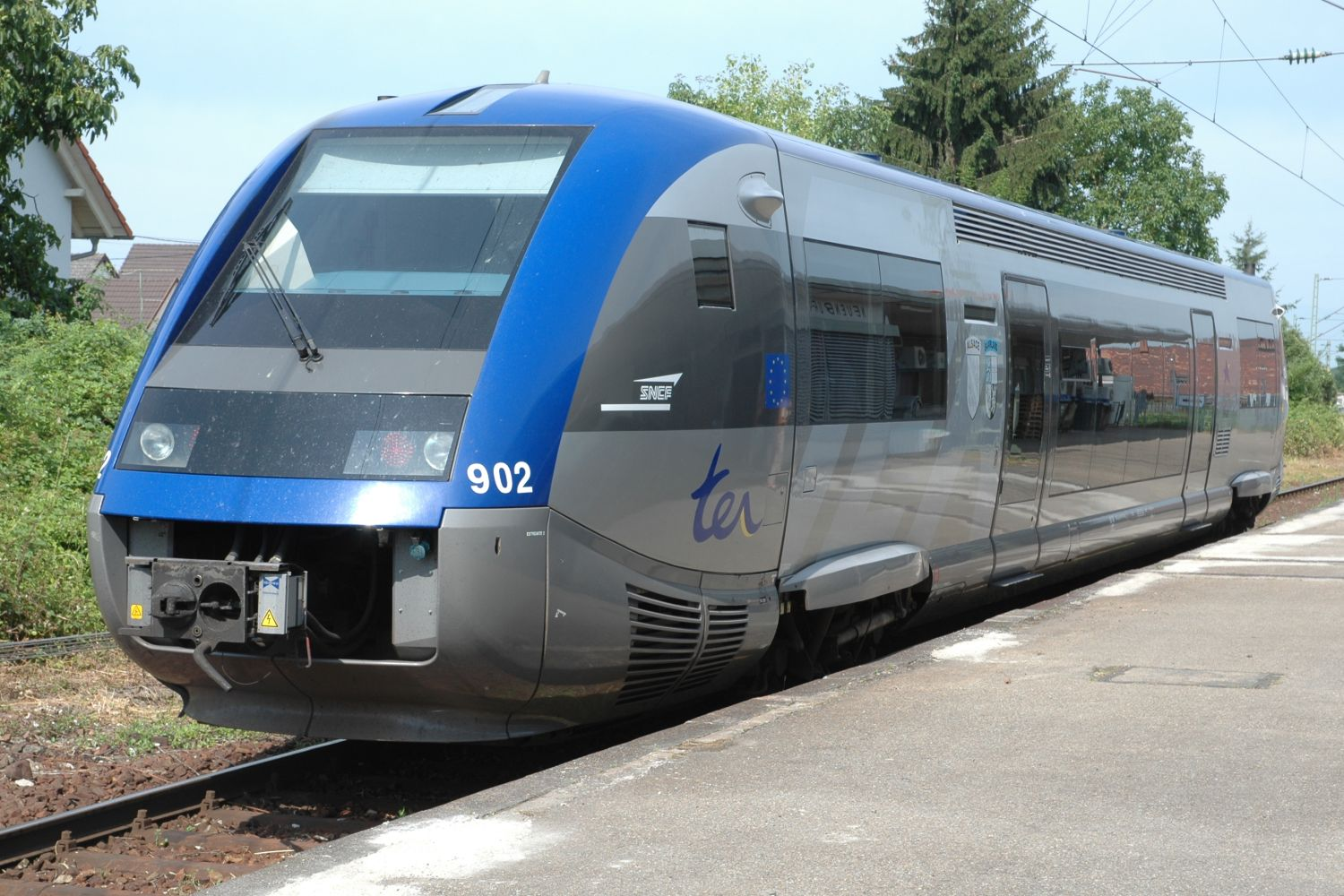
X 73902 at Neuenburg am Rhein in 2006

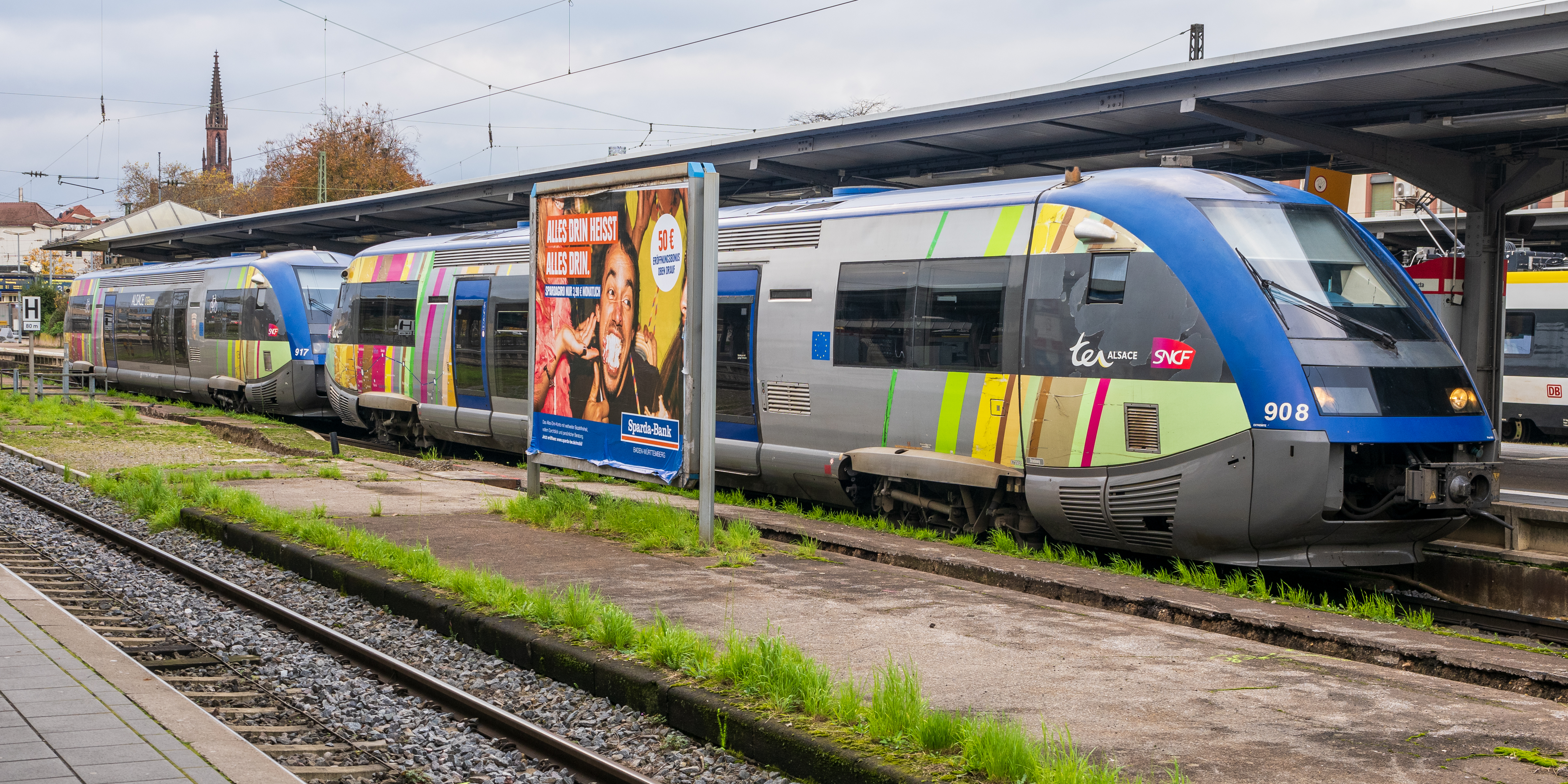
X73908 & X73917 at Offenburg main station (2024)

The SNCF Class X 73900 or A TER is an identical version of the X 73500, but can also operate into Germany. Built from 2001 to 2004 by Alsthom DDF, it is equipped with train control systems for cross-border services to Germany.

They are numbered X 73901 - X73919, and allocated to Strasbourg depot.

The units are used on services that operate into Germany from France, on the following services:

- Saarbrücken - Strasbourg - Offenburg
- Metz - Saarbrücken
- Mulhouse - Müllheim - Freiburg im Breisgau

The units have two different liveries:

- TER Livery - Metallic Grey with Blue ends and TER logos. Most X 73500 carry this.
- DB Red - X73913 - X73915 wear a Red Deutsche Bahn livery with DB logos.
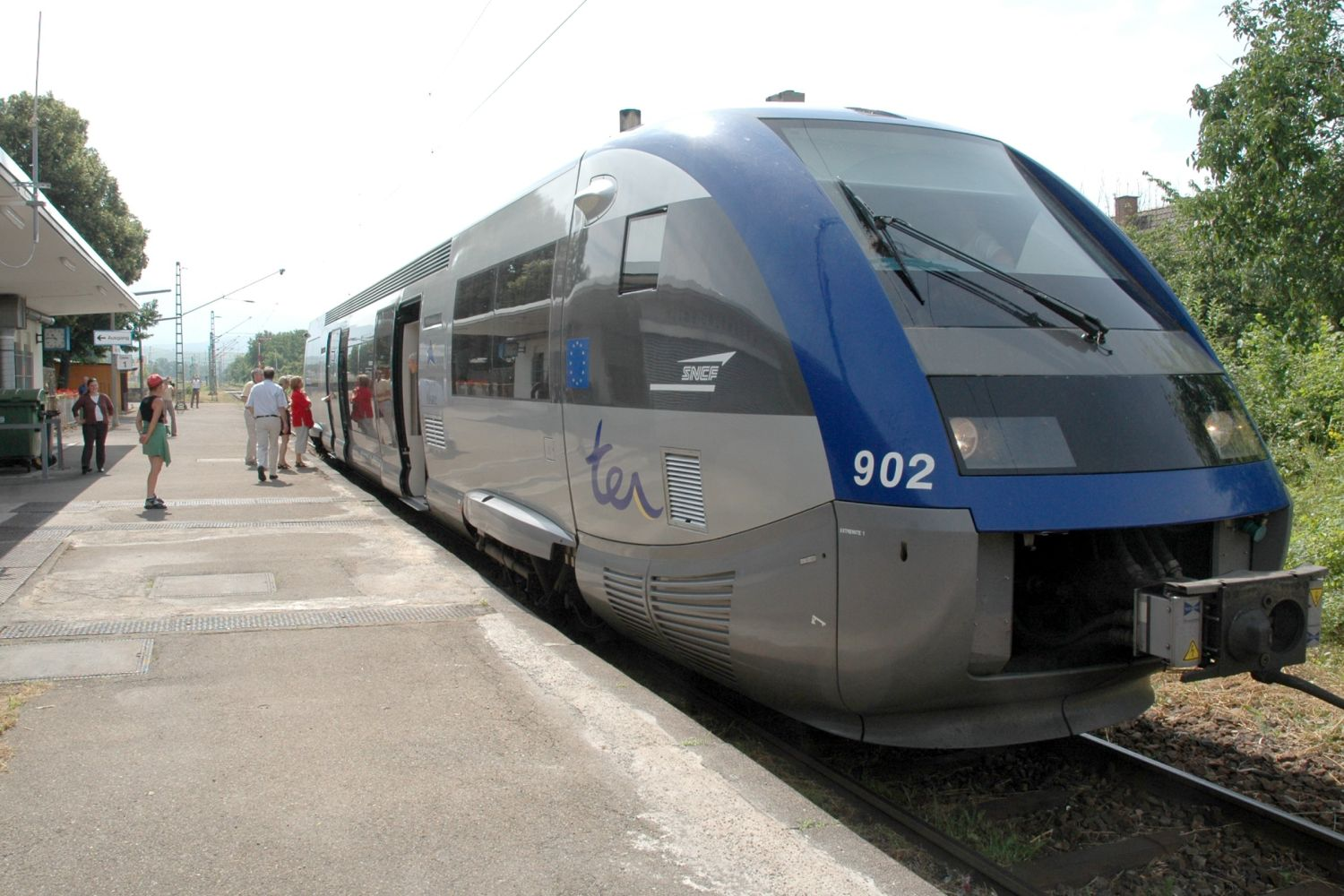
X73902

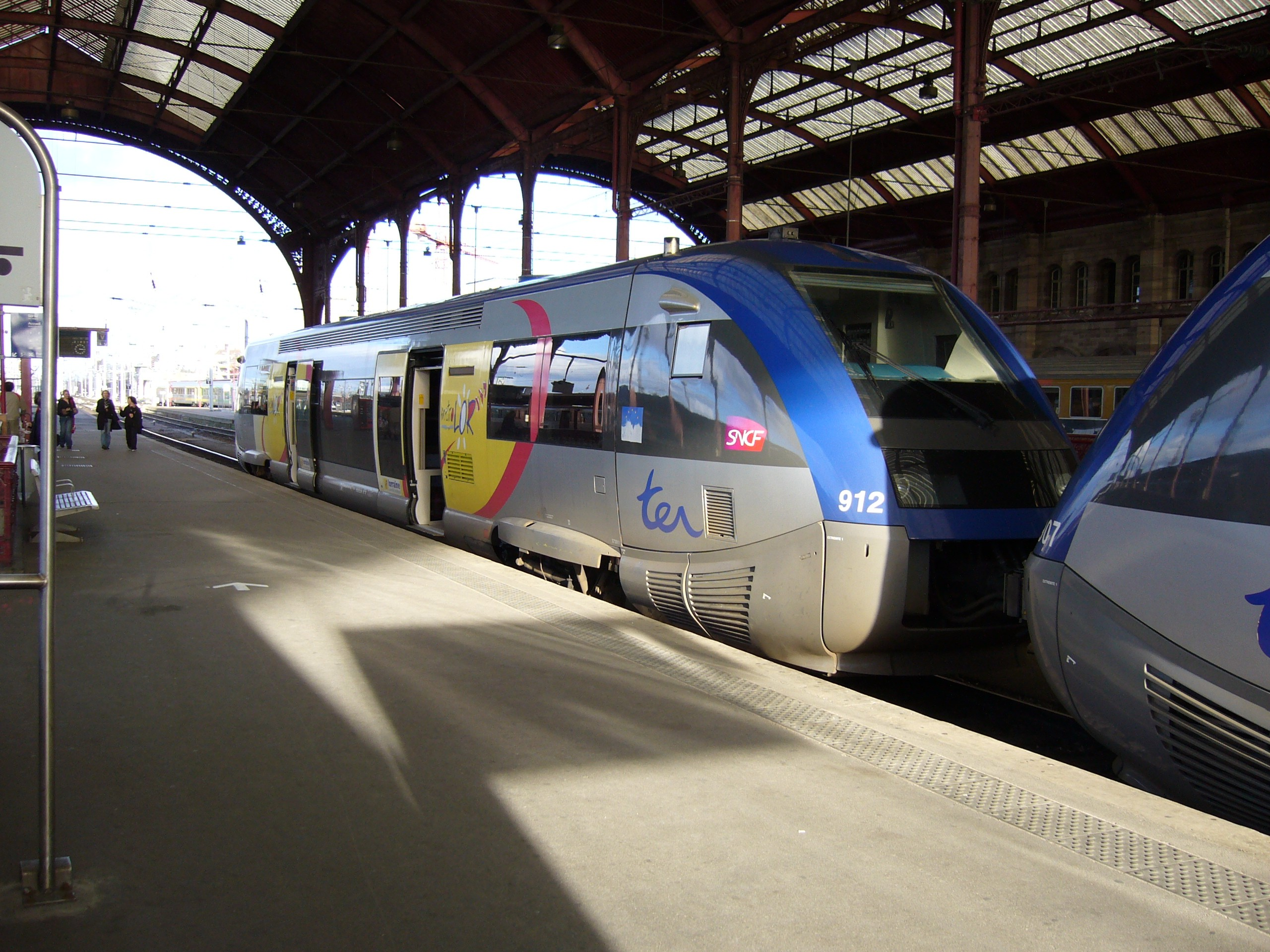
X73912 carrying special vinyls

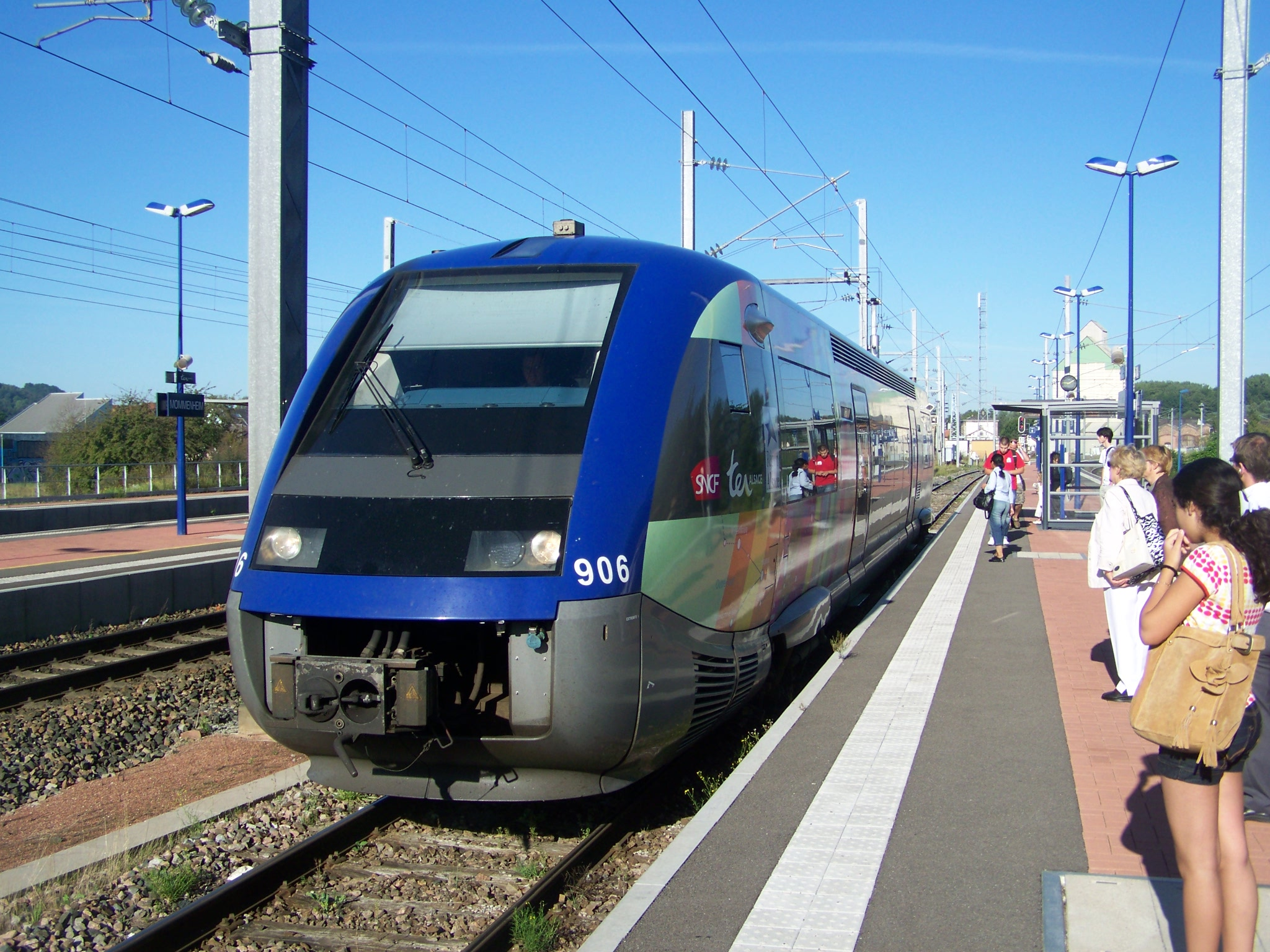
X73906 carrying special vinyls

== DBAG Class 641 ==
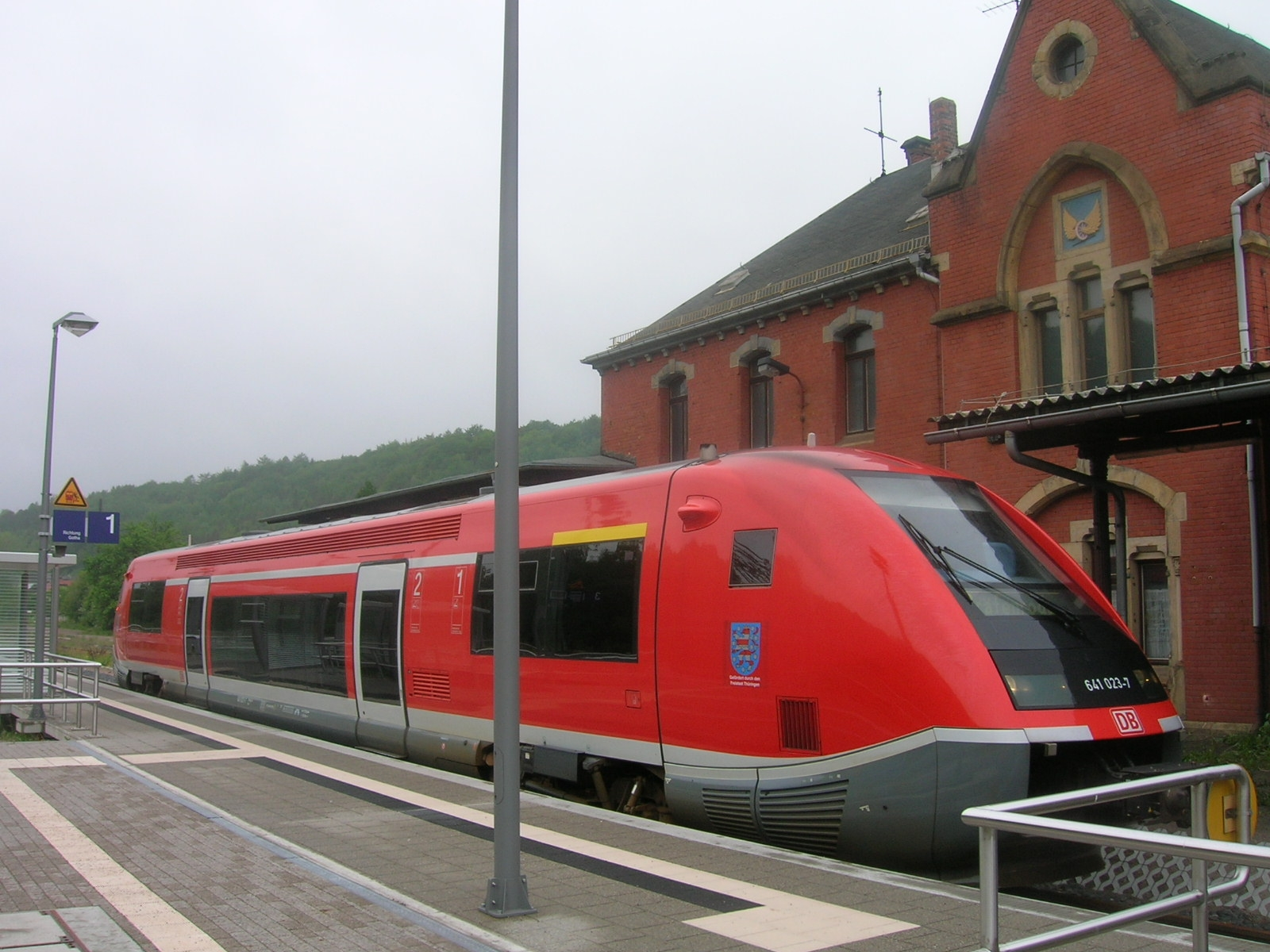
A Class 641 at Gräfenroda

The DBAG Class 641 (VT641) is a class of German railway vehicle operated by Deutsche Bahn. They are diesel railcars belonging to the Alstom Coradia A TER family. Their development started as a joint project between Deutsche Bahn and SNCF, on the one hand, and the railway vehicle manufacturers De Dietrich Ferroviaire and Linke-Hofmann-Busch, both subsidiaries of Alstom, on the other.

Forty units of this class were delivered to Deutsche Bahn, of which four have been retired due to accidents.

The railcars are fitted with centre buffer couplings. The arrangement of the two engines in front of the bogies, the bulging appearance of the coach body and the large, one-piece, swinging doors give the vehicle its characteristic appearance, which has earned it the nickname Walfisch (Whale).

They are deployed in Baden-Württemberg at Hochrhein – between Basel Badischer Bahnhof and Lauchringen – and in Thuringia at Erfurt, on lines including the Schwarzatalbahn between Rottenbach and Katzhütte, on the Pfefferminzbahn between Sömmerda and Großheringen, the Friedrichroda railway between Friedrichroda and Fröttstädt, on the line from Saalfeld to Blankenstein and the Gotha–Gräfenroda railway.

== See also ==
Comparable contemporary units

- Alstom Coradia LINT
- Stadler Regio-Shuttle
- VR Class Dm12

Other units of the operator

- List of CFL classes
- List of Deutsche Bahn AG locomotives and railbuses
- List of SNCF classes
