= Saint-Germain-des-Fossés station =

Railway station in Saint-Germain-des-Fossés, France

Coordinates: 46°12′32″N 3°25′50″E

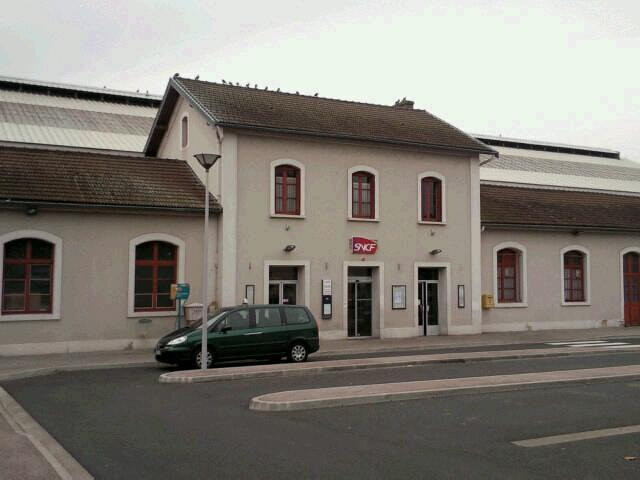
Saint-Germain-des-Fossés station

Saint-Germain-des-Fossés station (French: Gare de Saint-Germain-des-Fossés) is a railway station in Saint-Germain-des-Fossés, Auvergne-Rhône-Alpes, France. The station opened on 18 June 1854 and is located on the Moret–Lyon, Saint-Germain-des-Fossés–Nîmes and Saint-Germain-des-Fossés–Clermont-Ferrand via Vichy railway lines. The station is served by Intercités (long distance) and TER (local) services operated by SNCF.

== Train services ==
The following services call at Saint-Germain-des-Fossés as of 2022:

- intercity services (Intercités): (Nantes -) Tours - Bourges - Nevers - Moulins - Saint-Germain-des-Fossés - Roanne - Lyon
- local service (TER Auvergne-Rhône-Alpes): (Nevers -) Moulins - Saint-Germain-des-Fossés - Vichy - Clermont-Ferrand

Preceding station	SNCF	Following station
Moulins-sur-Allier towards Nantes	Intercités	Roanne towards Lyon-Perrache
Preceding station	TER Auvergne-Rhône-Alpes	Following station
Varennes-sur-Allier towards Nevers	14	Vichy towards Clermont-Ferrand

== Bus services ==
Buses depart from Saint-Germain-des-Fossés to Montluçon and Vichy.
