= Roanne station =

Railway station in Roanne, France

Coordinates: 46.0394°N 4.0634°E

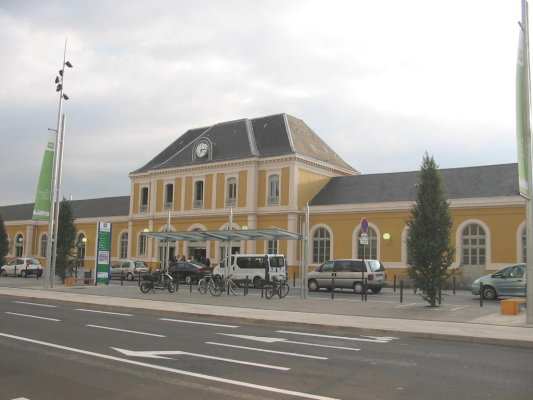
Station frontage

Roanne station (French: Gare de Roanne) is a French railway station located on the Moret–Lyon railway line in the city of Roanne, an administrative center of the department of the Loire in the Auvergne-Rhône-Alpes region.

This station is served by the SNCF (Intercités) and by Fret SNCF. It is also a regional station of the TER Auvergne-Rhône-Alpes network (a regional rail network serving the Auvergne-Rhône-Alpes region), connecting by "express regional" (TER) trains.

Eighty-six trains are used by 3,300 travelers each day.

== Position ==
The Gare de Roanne is situated at the kilometric markers 420/571 of the Lyon-Perrache–Moret-Veneux-les-Sablon line, between the stations at Saint-Germain-Lespinasse and Le Coteau.

== History ==
In June 1858, the railroad arrived in Roanne from Saint-Germain-des-Fossés, leading to the construction of the station. Since 9 December 2007 the station has had a regular service road like the entire TER Rhône-Alpes network. Benefiting from the building of the multiplex and of the bus station, plans were made for a great refurbishment between June and December 2008. On 7 June 2008 the renovation was commenced a century and a half after the station came into service. A new footbridge was built to link the station with the new bus station that was put into service in July 2008, and by 2009 the entire railway station had been renovated. The architect found his inspiration from the Gare de Saint-Étienne-Châteaucreux or from Vienna and Valencia.

On 24 August 2010, Roanne station became the first one in France to feature a day nursery for travelers. It is situated in the old luggage room, 150 square meters in size, and is open Monday to Friday, from 7 a.m. to 7:00 p.m.

== Passenger service ==
The Gare de Roanne has a passenger building with a ticket office that is open 7 days a week. The station is fitted with several Ticket Vending Machines. It is also a disabled access station and contains a newsstand and a car-rental agency.

Since 9 December 2007 the station has had regular service like the rest of the TER Rhône-Alpes network.

Intercity service lines (SNCF Intercités) to:

- Lyon-Part-Dieu and Lyon-Perrache
- Tours
- Nantes

Express regional trains (TER Auvergne-Rhône-Alpes) to:

- Saint-Étienne-Châteaucreux
- Clermont-Ferrand
- Lyon-Part-Dieu and Lyon-Perrache

Preceding station	SNCF	Following station
Saint-Germain-des-Fossés towards Nantes	Intercités	Lyon-Part-Dieu towards Lyon-Perrache
Preceding station	TER Auvergne-Rhône-Alpes	Following station
Vichy towards Clermont-Ferrand	6	Tarare towards Lyon-Perrache
Terminus	6	Le Coteau towards Lyon-Perrache
Terminus	12	Le Coteau towards Saint-Étienne

== Intermodality ==
The station includes a bicycle park and a parking lot. It is connected to a Star (Transports en Commun de Roannais Agglomération) bus station and is served by buses that shuttle travelers to and from the Gare du Creusot TGV, where high-speed rail service is available.
