= Moulins-sur-Allier station =

Railway station in Moulins, France

Coordinates: 46°33′41″N 3°20′21″E

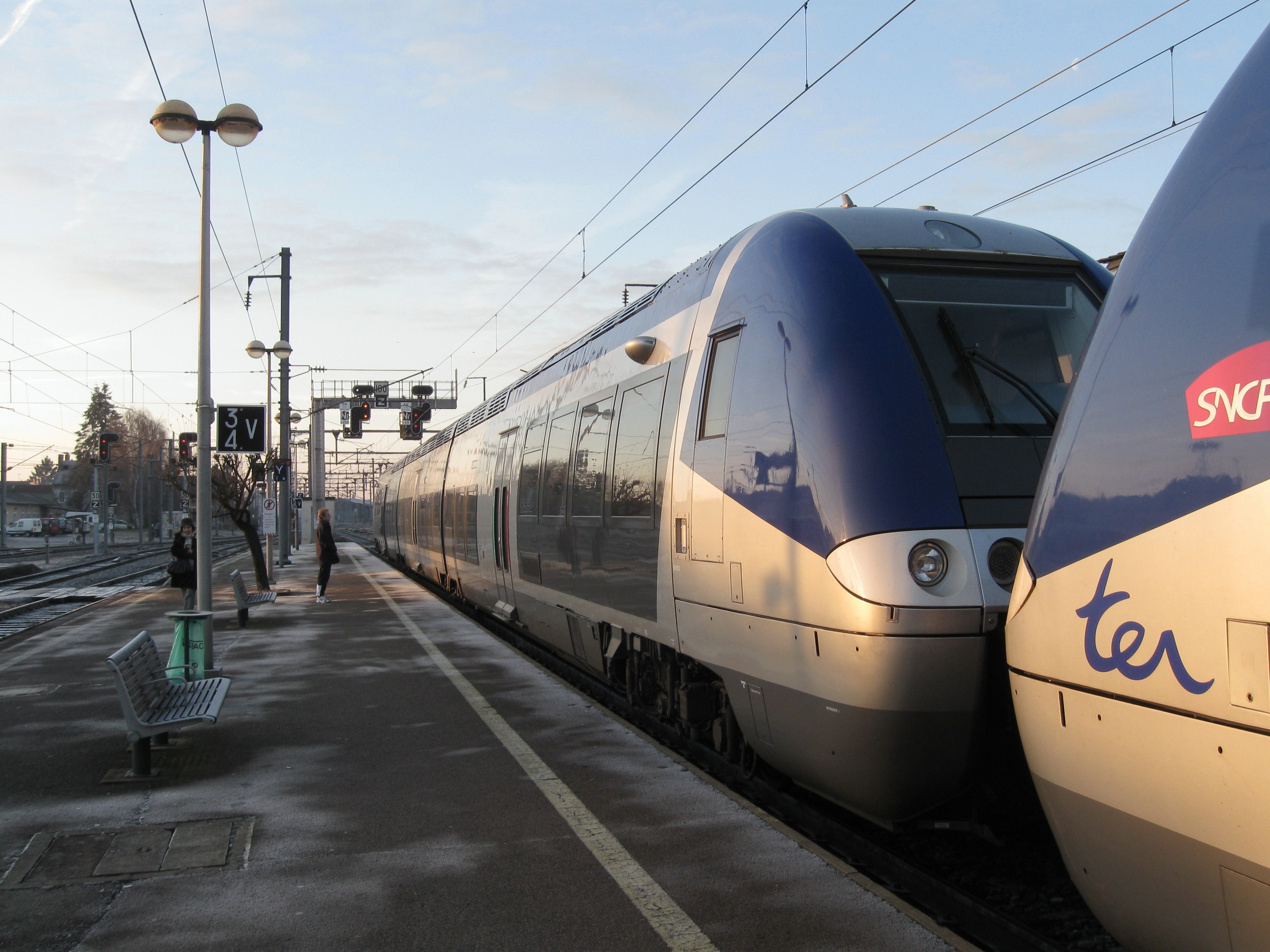
TER Orléans - Lyon en gare de Moulins, Allier, France

Moulins-sur-Allier station (French: Gare de Moulins-sur-Allier) is a railway station serving the town Moulins, Allier department, central France. It is situated on the Moret–Lyon railway, the Montluçon–Moulins railway and the Moulins–Mâcon railway. The station is served by long distance trains (Intercités) towards Paris, Nantes, Clermont-Ferrand and Lyon, and regional trains towards Clermont-Ferrand, Dijon, Nevers, Montchanin and Lyon.

Preceding station	SNCF	Following station
Nevers towards Paris-Bercy	Intercités	Vichy towards Clermont-Ferrand
Nevers towards Nantes	Intercités	Saint-Germain-des-Fossés towards Lyon-Perrache
Preceding station	TER Auvergne-Rhône-Alpes	Following station
Villeneuve-sur-Allier towards Nevers	14	Bessay-sur-Allier towards Clermont-Ferrand
Preceding station	TER Bourgogne-Franche-Comté	Following station
Terminus	TER	Dompierre-Sept-Fons towards Dijon
Saint-Pierre-le-Moûtier towards Nevers	TER	Dompierre-Sept-Fons towards Lyon-Perrache
