= Saincaize station =

Railway station in France

Saincaize
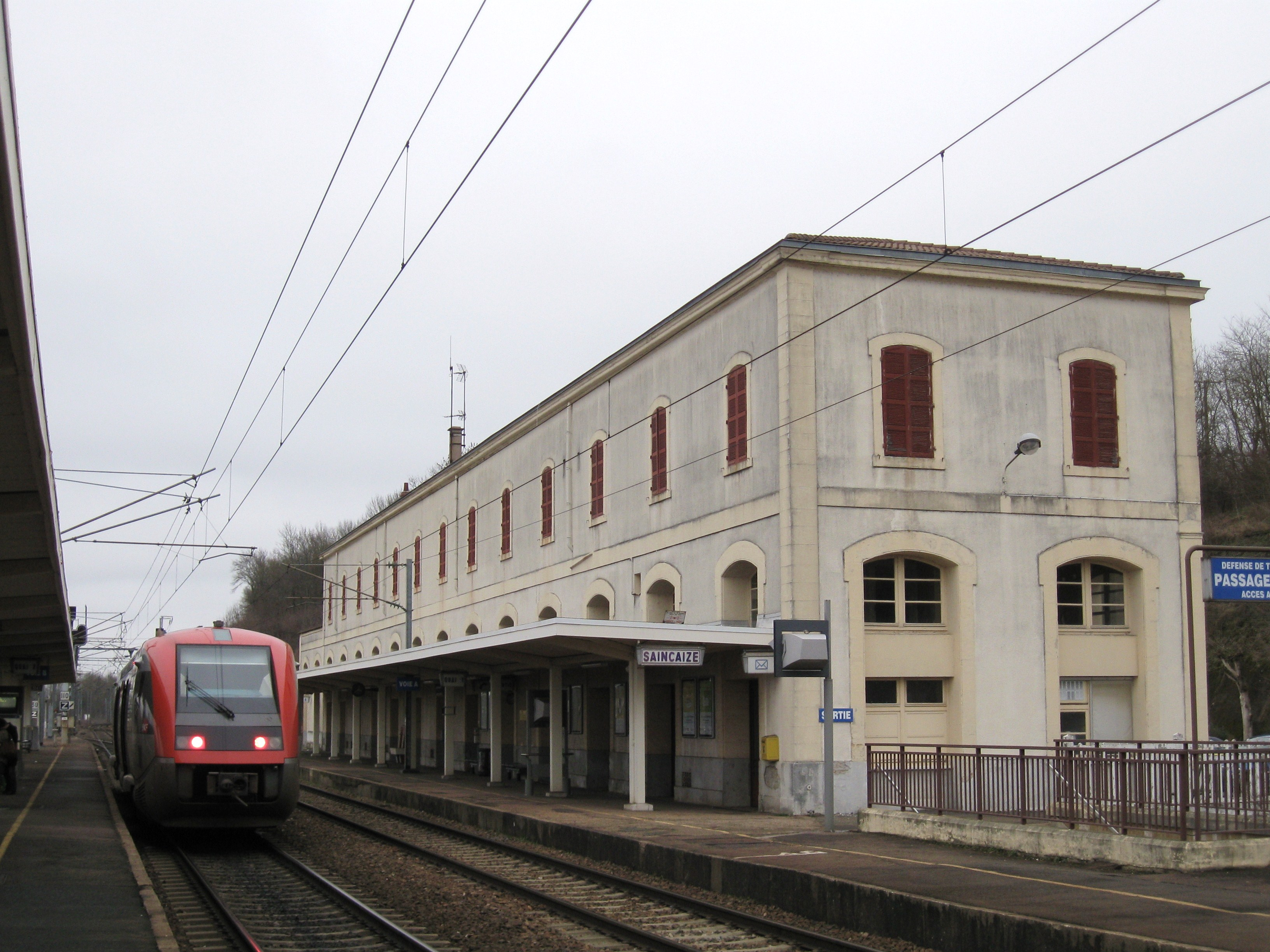
- Gare de Saincaize

General information
- Location: Saincaize-Meauce, Nièvre, Bourgogne-Franche-Comté; France
- Coordinates: 46°55′50″N 3°4′18″E
- Lines: Moret-Lyon railway Vierzon-Saincaize railway
- Platforms: 3

Other information
- Station code: 87696260

History
- Opened: 15 November 1847

Services
Preceding station	TER Bourgogne-Franche-Comté	Following station
Nevers Terminus	TER	Saint-Pierre-le-Moûtier towards Lyon-Perrache
Preceding station	TER Auvergne-Rhône-Alpes	Following station
Nevers Terminus	14	Saint-Pierre-le-Moûtier towards Clermont-Ferrand
Location

Saincaize is a railway station in Saincaize-Meauce, Bourgogne-Franche-Comté, France. The station opened on 15 November 1847 and is located on the Moret-Lyon railway and Vierzon-Saincaize railway. The station is served by Intercités (long distance) and TER (local) services operated by SNCF.

There is a freight yard at the station.

== Train services ==
The station is served by regional trains towards Moulins, Nevers, Lyon and Clermont-Ferrand.

- regional service (TER Auvergne-Rhône-Alpes) Nevers - Moulins - Saint-Germain-des-Fossés - Vichy - Clermont-Ferrand
- regional service (TER Bourgogne-Franche-Comté) Nevers - Moulins - Paray-le-Monial - Lyon
