= Z-TER (Z 21500) =

Class of 57 French electric multiple unit trains

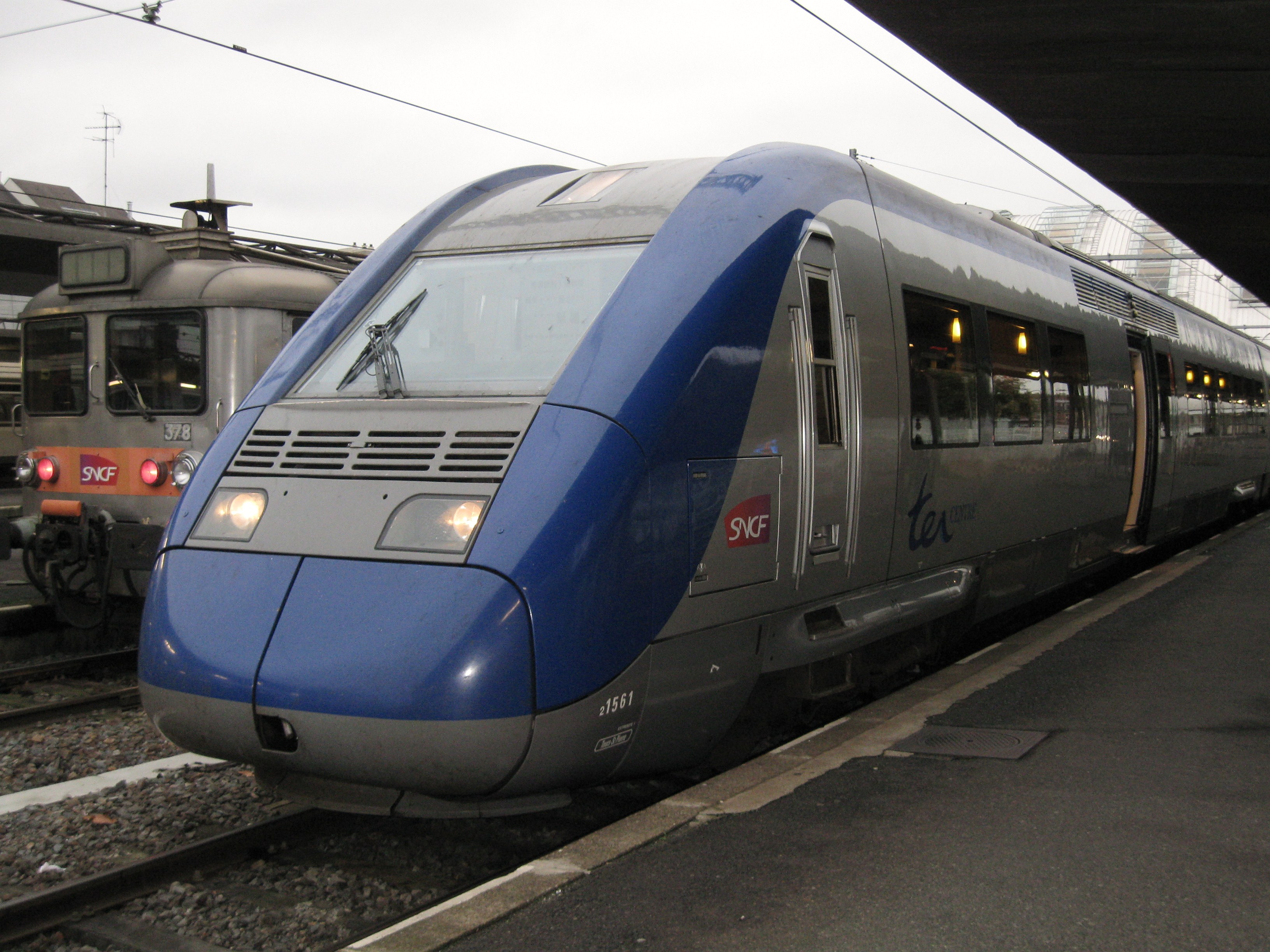
- Z 21561 (TER Centre) in Orléans station
- In service: 2003
- Manufacturers: Alstom, Bombardier
- Constructed: 2003–2004
- Number built: 57
- Number in service: 57
- Formation: 3 cars
- Fleet numbers: Z21500
- Capacity: 211; 1st : 36; 2nd : 175
- Operator: SNCF
- Depots: RES, SAQ, SP

Specifications
- Car body construction: Stainless steel
- Train length: 79.2 m (259 ft 10 in)
- Width: 2.905 m (9 ft 6.4 in)
- Height: 4.218 m (13 ft 10.1 in)
- Doors: 1 per side
- Maximum speed: 200 km/h
- Weight: 162 tonnes
- Power output: 1,760 kW (2,360 hp)
- Electric systems: Overhead line: 25 kV 50 Hz AC; 1,500 V DC
- Track gauge: 1,435 mm (4 ft 8 1/2 in)

The Z-TER (Z 21500) is a French model of electric multiple unit regional passenger train, manufactured by Alstom and Bombardier Transportation, and operated by SNCF.

They are used on regional links, and can be coupled with another Z-TER. They are derived from the French diesel passenger regional train "X-TER" (SNCF Class X 72500), and is the first regional train to reach 200 km/h.

Their main characteristic is their ability to travel at 124.27 mph (200 km/h), which constitutes a first for TER self-propelled equipment. This ability, used every day over several sections of conventional lines, is also operated for the first time on a high speed line since 2017. This is a first in France, thanks to an adaptation of eight of these elements to signaling specific to LGVs, then renumbered as Z 21700.

As other regional trains, they are owned by the French regions, and are dispatched as :

- 19 "Pays de la Loire" region
- 15 "Centre" region
- 6 "Aquitaine" region
- 17 "Bretagne" region

== Timeline ==
- From 2002 to 2004: delivery of 57 copies to the PoitouCharentes, Aquitaine, Centre, Pays de la Loire and Brittany.
- 2009: The Poitou-Charentes region sells its five elements to the Pays region of the Loire, carrying the park of its last 19 units.
- 2014: The Aquitaine region sells its six elements to the Centre, Brittany and Pays de la Loire, at the rate of two items by region. The park is then holds more than these last three regions.
- 2015 to 2016: Transportation of eight vehicles in the Pays de la Loire park in Z-21700.
- 2017: Circulation of Z-21700 on the LGV Bretagne-Pays de la Loire and on the Sablé comma ensuring TER Nantes – Rennes via Sable

== See also ==
- List of high speed trains
