= Saincaize-Meauce =

- Commune
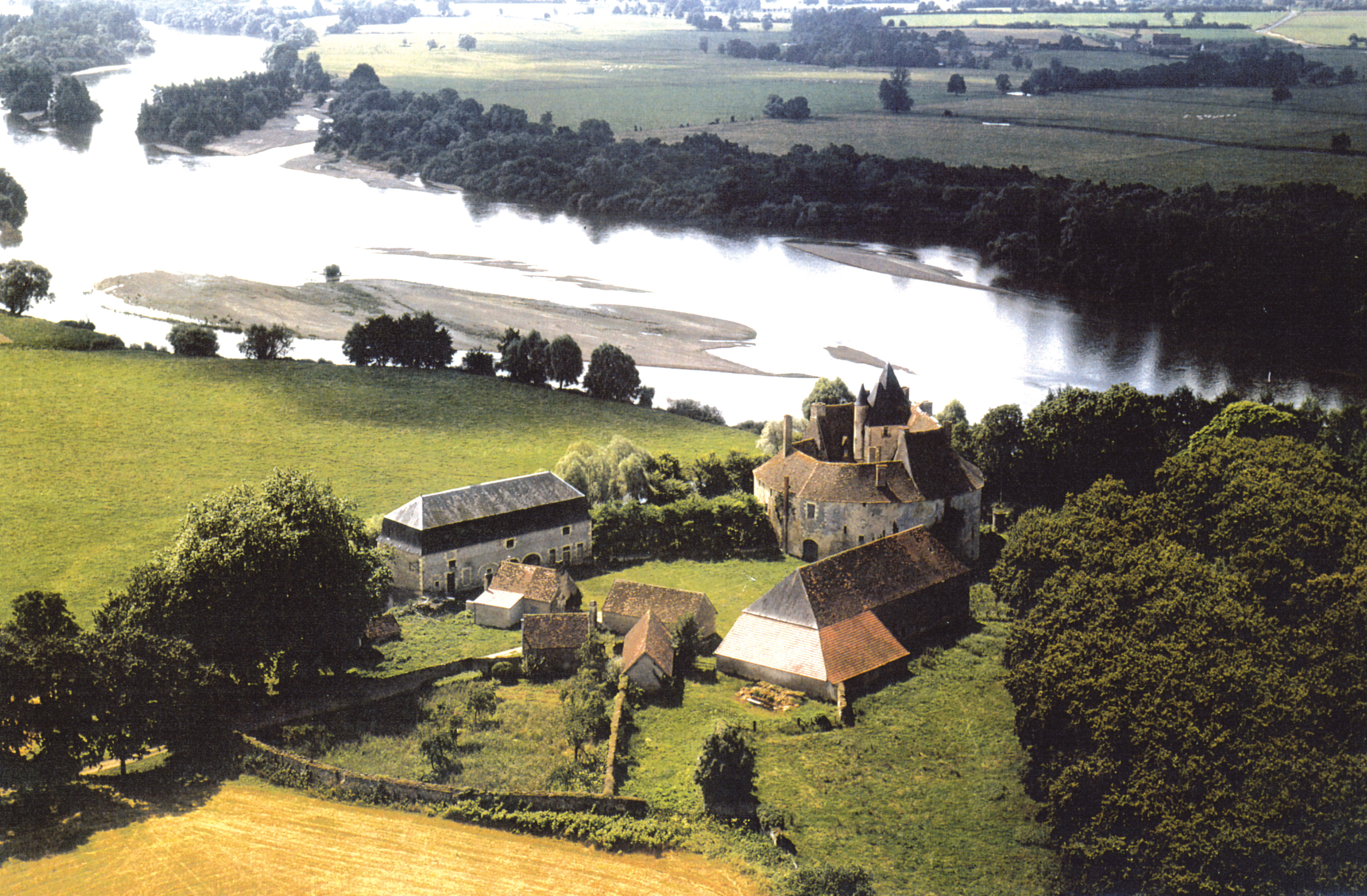
- Chateau de Meauce
- Location of Saincaize-Meauce
- Location within France Location within Bourgogne-Franche-Comté
- Coordinates: 46°54′30″N 3°05′01″E
- Country: France
- Region: Bourgogne-Franche-Comté
- Department: Nièvre
- Arrondissement: Nevers
- Canton: Nevers-3
- Intercommunality: CA Nevers

Government
  - Mayor (2020–2026): Pascal Dessauny
- Area^{1}: 21.48 km^{2} (8.29 sq mi)
- Highest elevation: 261 m (856 ft)
- Lowest elevation: 170 m (560 ft)
- Population (2023): 358
  - Density: 16.7/km^{2} (43.2/sq mi)
- Time zone: UTC+01:00 (CET)
  - Summer (DST): UTC+02:00 (CEST)
- INSEE/Postal code: 58225 /58470
- ^{1} French Land Register data, which excludes lakes, ponds, glaciers > 1 km^{2} (0.386 sq mi or 247 acres) and river estuaries.

Saincaize-Meauce (French pronunciation: [sɛ̃kɛz mos]) is a commune in the Nièvre department in central France. Saincaize station has rail connections to Nevers, Lyon and Clermont-Ferrand.

== See also ==
- Communes of the Nièvre department
