= SNCF Class X 72500 =

Class of French diesel multiple unit trains

SNCF X 72500
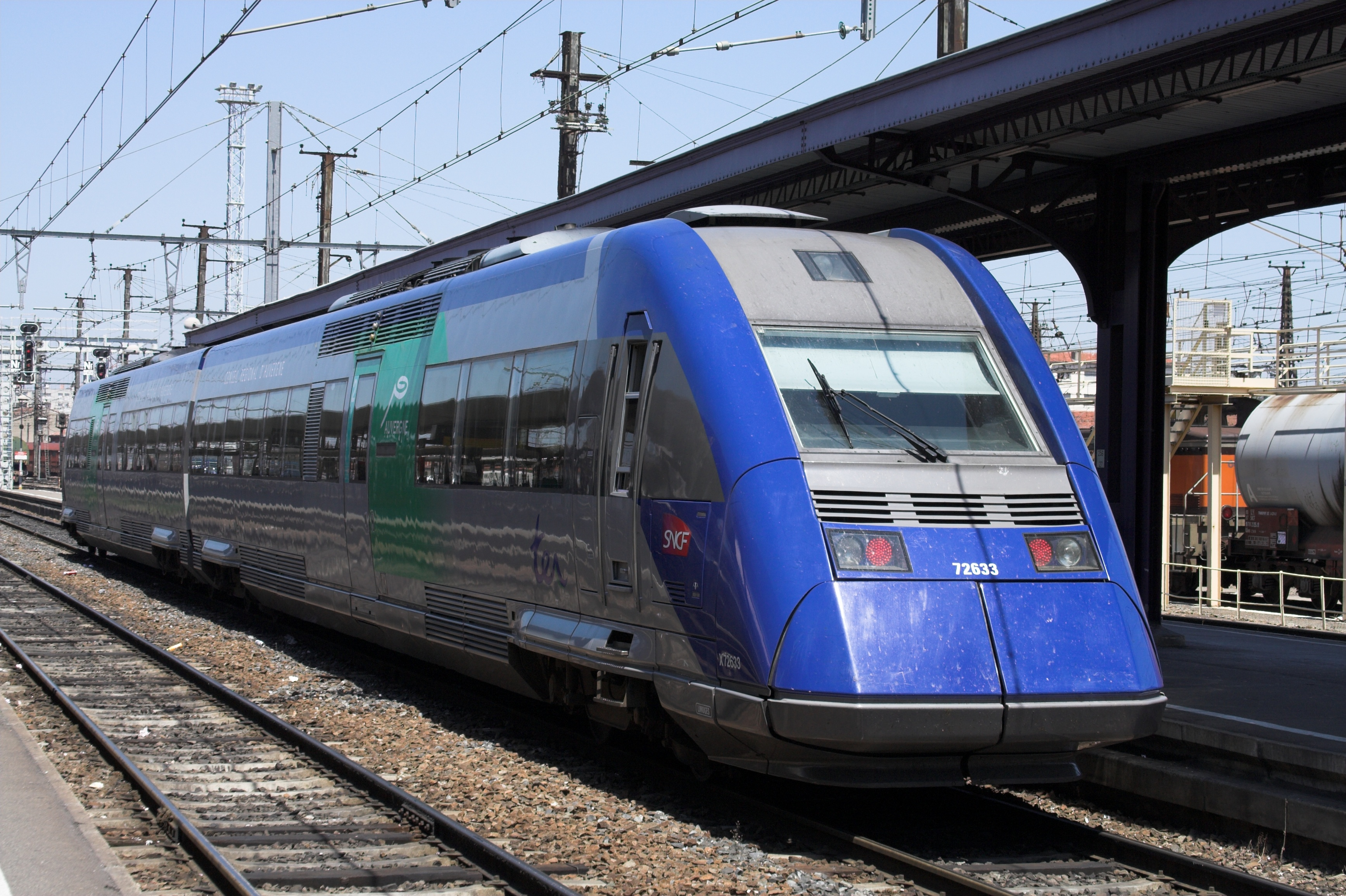
- X72633 of TER Auvergne at Toulouse-Matabiau
- Manufacturer: Alstom
- Constructed: 1997–2002
- Number built: 117
- Number in service: 85
- Operators: SNCF, Regio Călători
- Line served: Transport express régional

Specifications
- Maximum speed: 160 km/h (99 mph)
- Prime mover: MAN Diesel engines - 3 per car
- Transmission: Voith hydraulic
- Safety system: KVB
- Track gauge: 1,435 mm (4 ft 8 1/2 in) standard gauge

The SNCF Class X 72500 diesel multiple units were built by Alstom between 1997 and 2002. They operate longer distance Transport Express Regional and Intercites services particularly in the areas south and west of Paris, the Paris to Leon line, around Tours, Nantes, Toulouse, Lyon, Dijon, Nevers, Grenoble, Bordeaux and the South Coast of France. They do not operate in the far north of France. It is a family member of the electric multiple unit Z-TER (Z 21500).

== Description ==
The X 72500 units come in two types:

- 90 two car sets (both vehicles powered)
- 15 three car sets (containing an intermediate unpowered trailer)

Three sets can be coupled where required

The maximum speed is 160 kilometres per hour (99 mph).

Units are equipped with two MAN six-cylinder engines of 300 kilowatts (400 hp) per motor vehicle. Each train has four engines for traction, giving a total power of 1,200 kW (1,600 hp). The engines drive a hydromechanical Voith transmission. Additionally each vehicle also includes a 135 kW (181 hp) Perkins/Mecalte diesel generator for auxiliaries (lighting, air conditioning, door controls, etc..). The braking system is provided by mechanical disc brakes coupled to a hydrodynamic engine brake.

The driving position, TGV type centered in the cab, was designed to facilitate the work of the driver. It also includes elements to enable Driver Only Operation (but the absence of CCTV/mirrors require a second crew member on board) and the ATESS system, a data recorder way more advanced than those fitted to previous stock. The overall management of the equipment is insured by an onboard computer system. Failures can be quickly diagnosed by it. Check levels of oil, fuel and coolant are the same computer. Phase reliability of these railcars has also been particularly long, which earned them a bad reputation even today. Two back operations at the factory took place: Retrofit 1, 1998 to mid- 1999, aimed to security changes and installing new versions of the onboard computer system; Retrofit 2, from mid- 1999 to late 2000, where more than 200 modifications were made, mainly at the level of passenger comfort. In 2006, recurrent problems still existed at the level of generators and devices for opening and closing doors.

== Gallery ==
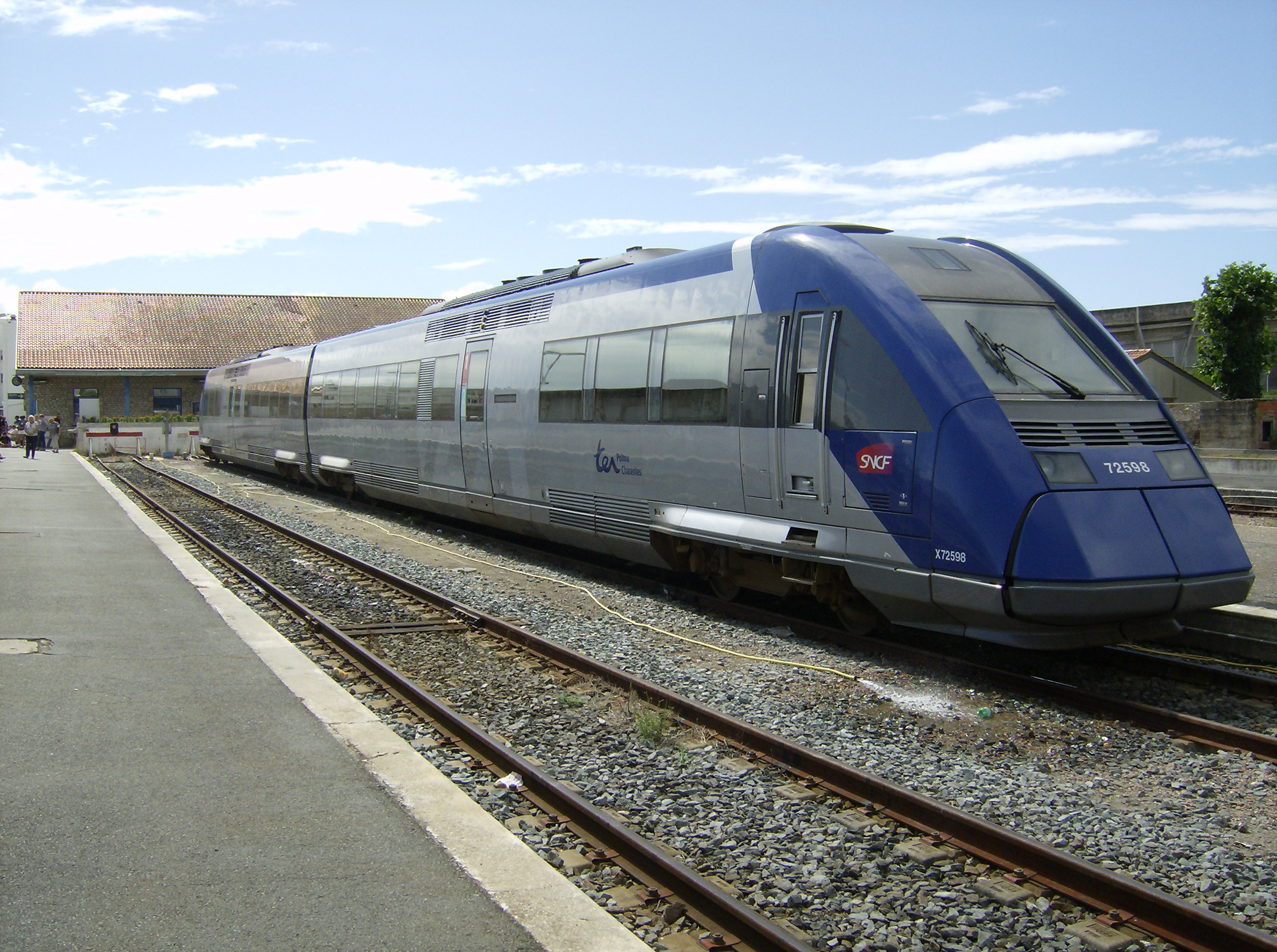
X 72500 at Royan station.

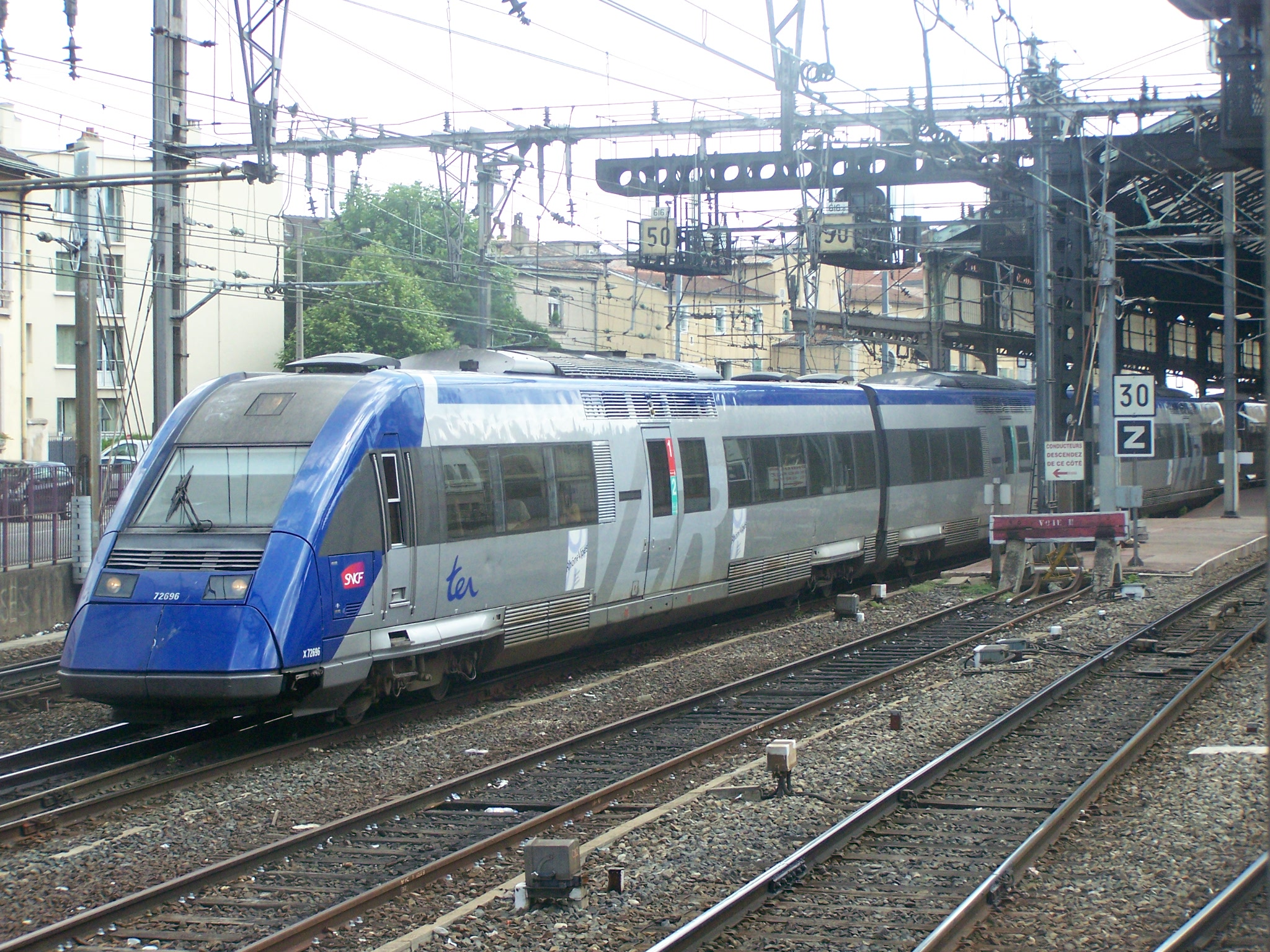
An X 72500 leaving Valence-Ville station.
- Video: X 72 700 at YouTube (second part of Video)
