= Montluçon-Ville station =

Railway station in Montluçon, France

Montluçon
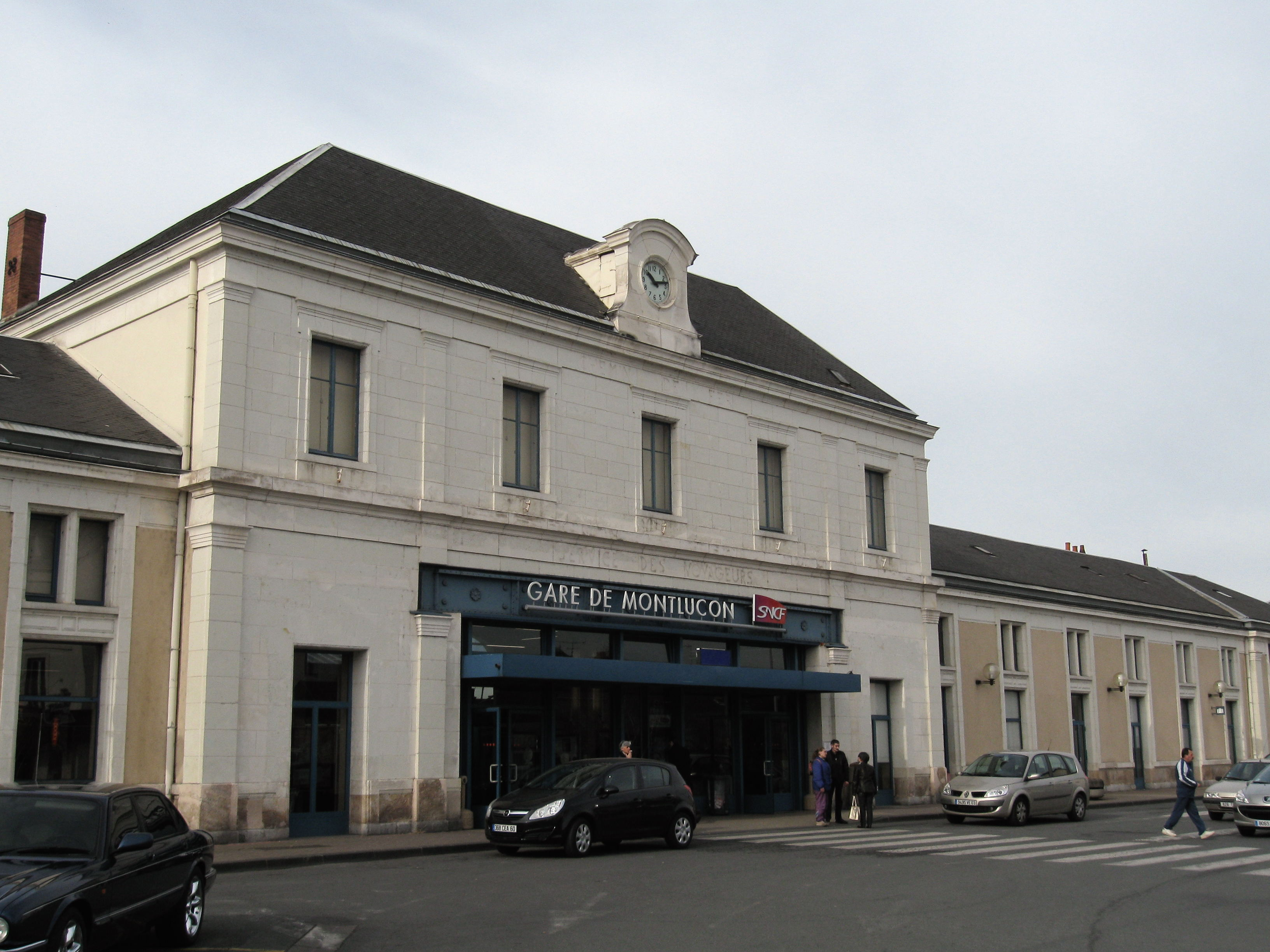
- The passenger building and entrance to the station

General information
- Location: Avenue Marx-Dormoy; Montluçon 03100; France
- Coordinates: 46.3378°N 2.5961°E
- Elevation: 207 m (679 ft)
- Owner: SNCF
- Operator: SNCF
- Lines: Montluçon–Saint-Sulpice-Laurière; Montluçon–Gouttières; Montluçon–Moulins; Bourges–Miécaze (not operated to Miecaze)

History
- Opened: 7 November 1859

Passengers
- 2020: 191,312

Services
Preceding station	TER Auvergne-Rhône-Alpes	Following station
Terminus	16	Montluçon-Rimard towards Clermont-Ferrand
Preceding station	Le Réseau Rémi	Following station
La Ville-Gozet towards Bourges	4.1	Terminus
Preceding station	TER Nouvelle-Aquitaine	Following station
Huriel towards Limoges	25	Terminus
Location

Montluçon-Ville station (French: Gare de Montluçon-Ville) is a railway station serving the town Montluçon, Allier department, central France.

== Services ==
The station is served by regional trains to Limoges, Bourges and Clermont-Ferrand.
