= Bourges station =

Railway station in Bourges, France

Bourges
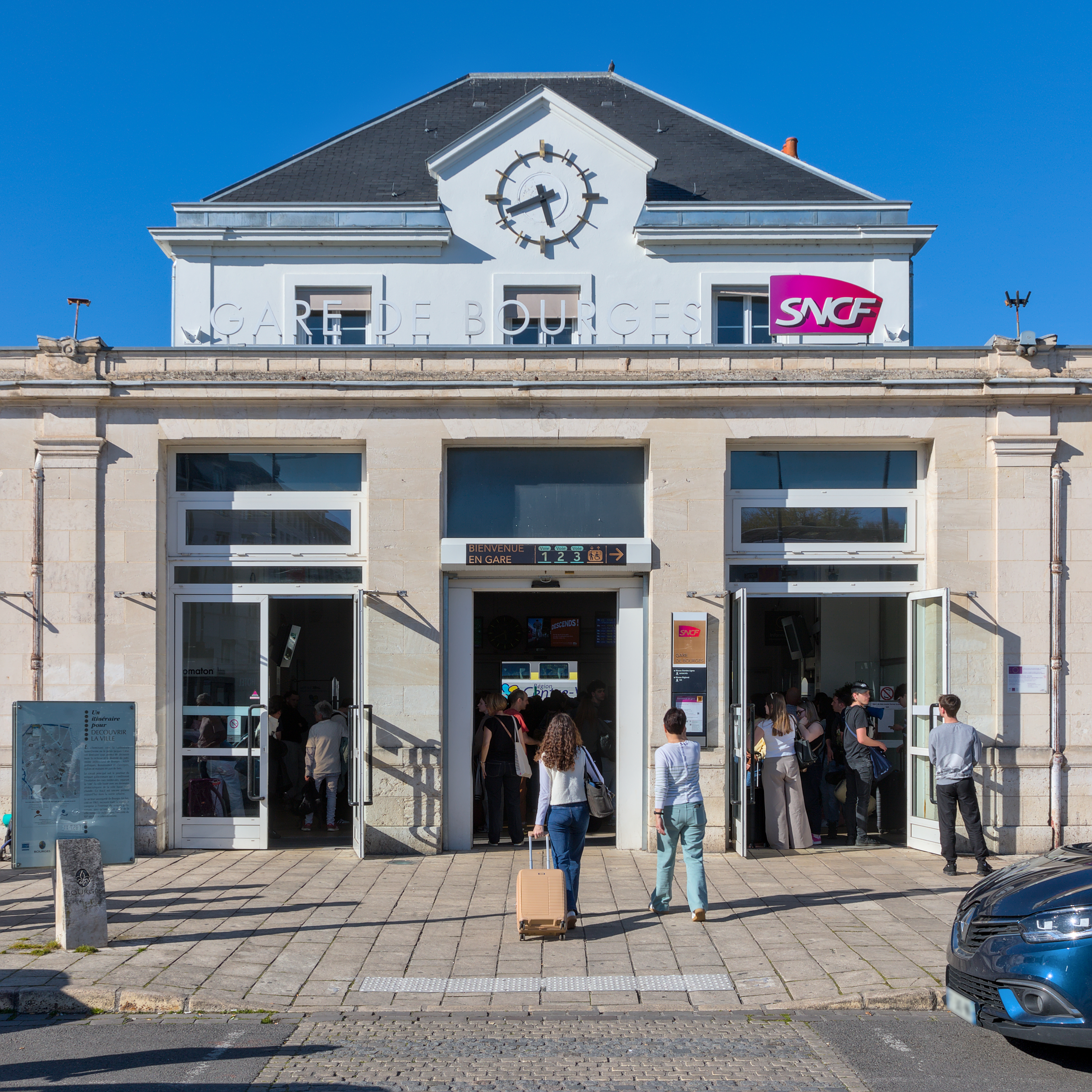
- The station building

General information
- Location: Place du Général Leclerc, 18000; Bourges; France
- Coordinates: 47.0944°N 2.3942°E
- Owner: SNCF
- Operator: SNCF
- Lines: Vierzon–Saincaize; Auxy-Juranville–Bourges; Bourges–Miécaze

Other information
- Station code: 87576207

Passengers
- 2024: 1,383,929

Services
| Preceding station | SNCF | Following station |
|---|---|---|
| Vierzon-Ville towards Nantes | Intercités | Nevers towards Lyon-Perrache |
| Preceding station | Le Réseau Rémi | Following station |
| Marmagne towards Vierzon | 1.4 | Saint-Germain-du-Puy towards Nevers |
| Terminus | 4.1 | Saint-Florent-sur-Cher towards Montluçon |
Location

Bourges station (French: Gare de Bourges) is a railway station serving the town Bourges, Cher department, central France.

== Services ==
The station is served by Intercités (long distance) services operated by SNCF between Nantes and Lyon, and by regional services (TER Centre-Val de Loire) to Paris-Austerlitz, Nevers, Vierzon, Tours, Orléans and Montluçon.
