= Nevers station =

Railway station in Nevers, France

Nevers
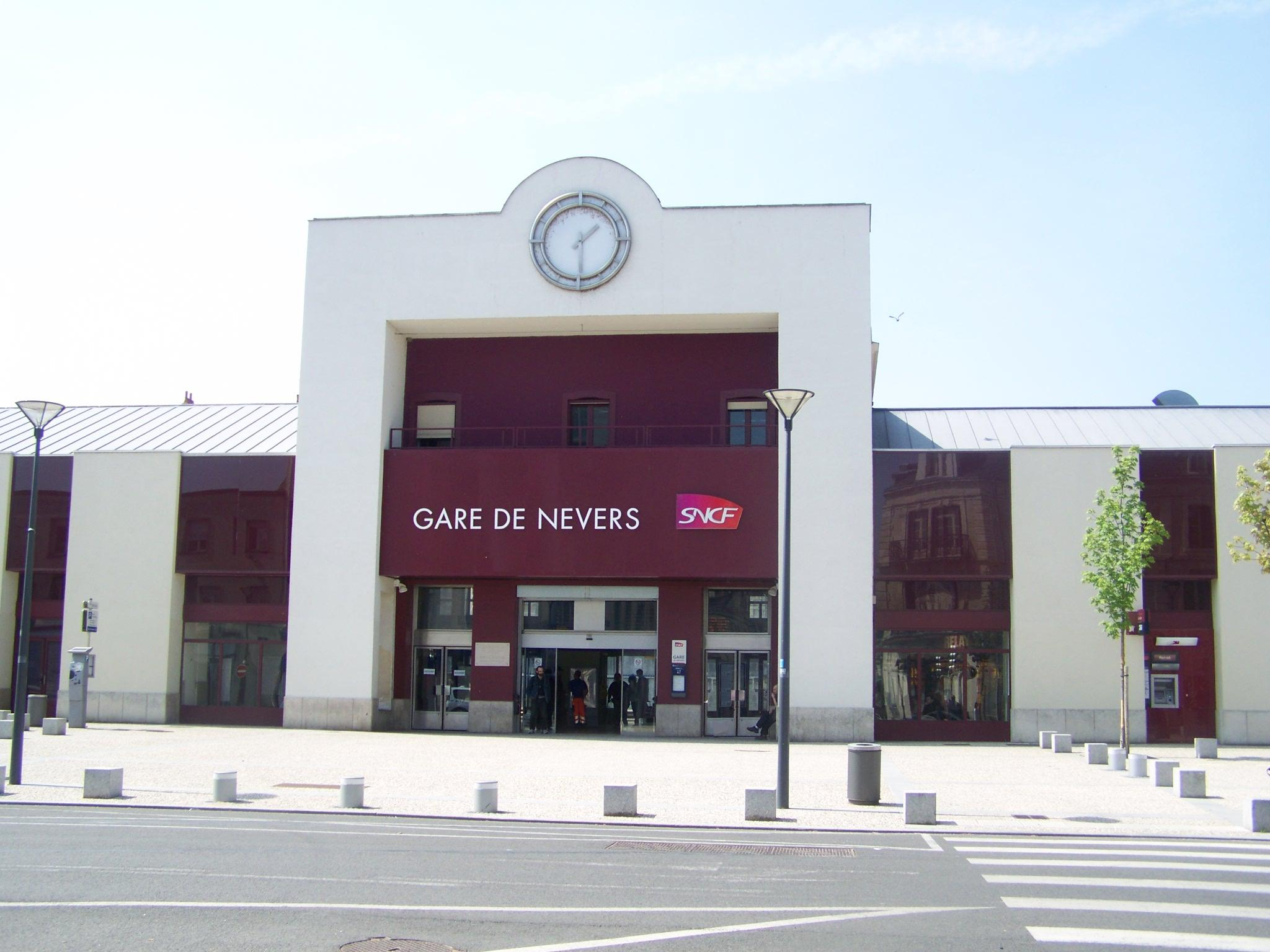
- Gare de Nevers

General information
- Location: Nevers, Nièvre, Bourgogne-Franche-Comté; France
- Coordinates: 46°59′13″N 3°9′2″E
- Lines: Moret-Lyon railway Vierzon-Nevers railway Nevers-Chagny railway Clamecy-Nevers railway
- Platforms: 5
- Tracks: 5

Other information
- Station code: 87696005

History
- Opened: 5 October 1850

Passengers
- 2024: 1,158,666
Services
Preceding station	SNCF	Following station
Paris-Bercy Terminus	Intercités	Moulins-sur-Allier towards Clermont-Ferrand
Fourchambault towards Paris-Bercy	Intercités	Terminus
Bourges towards Nantes	Intercités	Moulins-sur-Allier towards Lyon-Perrache
Preceding station	TER Bourgogne-Franche-Comté	Following station
Terminus	TER	Nevers-les-Perrières towards Dijon
Vauzelles towards Cosne-sur-Loire	TER	Nevers-les-Perrières towards Nevers-le-Banlay
Terminus	TER	Saincaize towards Lyon-Perrache
Preceding station	TER Auvergne-Rhône-Alpes	Following station
Terminus	14	Saincaize towards Clermont-Ferrand
Preceding station	Le Réseau Rémi	Following station
La Guerche-sur-l'Aubois towards Vierzon	1.4	Terminus
Location

Nevers is a railway station in Nevers, Bourgogne-Franche-Comté, France. The station opened on 5 October 1850 and is located on the Moret-Lyon, Vierzon - Saincaize, Nevers - Chagny and Clamecy - Nevers railway lines. The station is served by Intercités (long distance) and TER (local) services operated by SNCF.

To the North of the station is the large Nevers Works and Nevers Depot where many trains are maintained, overhauled etc. Also at the rear of the station are a few sidings where freight and passenger trains are kept.

== Train services ==
The station is served by intercity and regional trains towards Cosne-sur-Loire, Moulins, Clermont-Ferrand, Lyon, Dijon, Orléans and Paris.

== Gallery ==
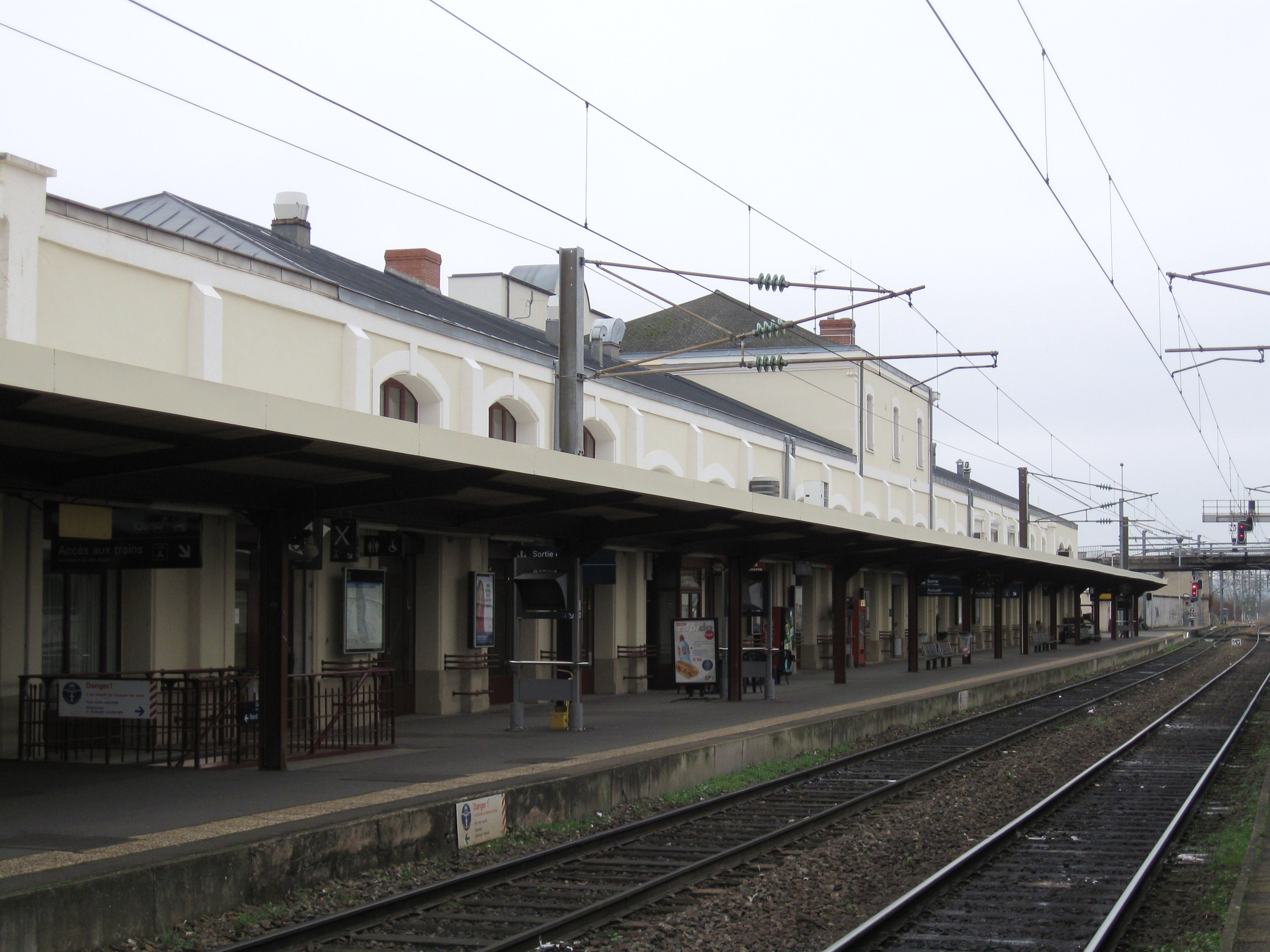
The station

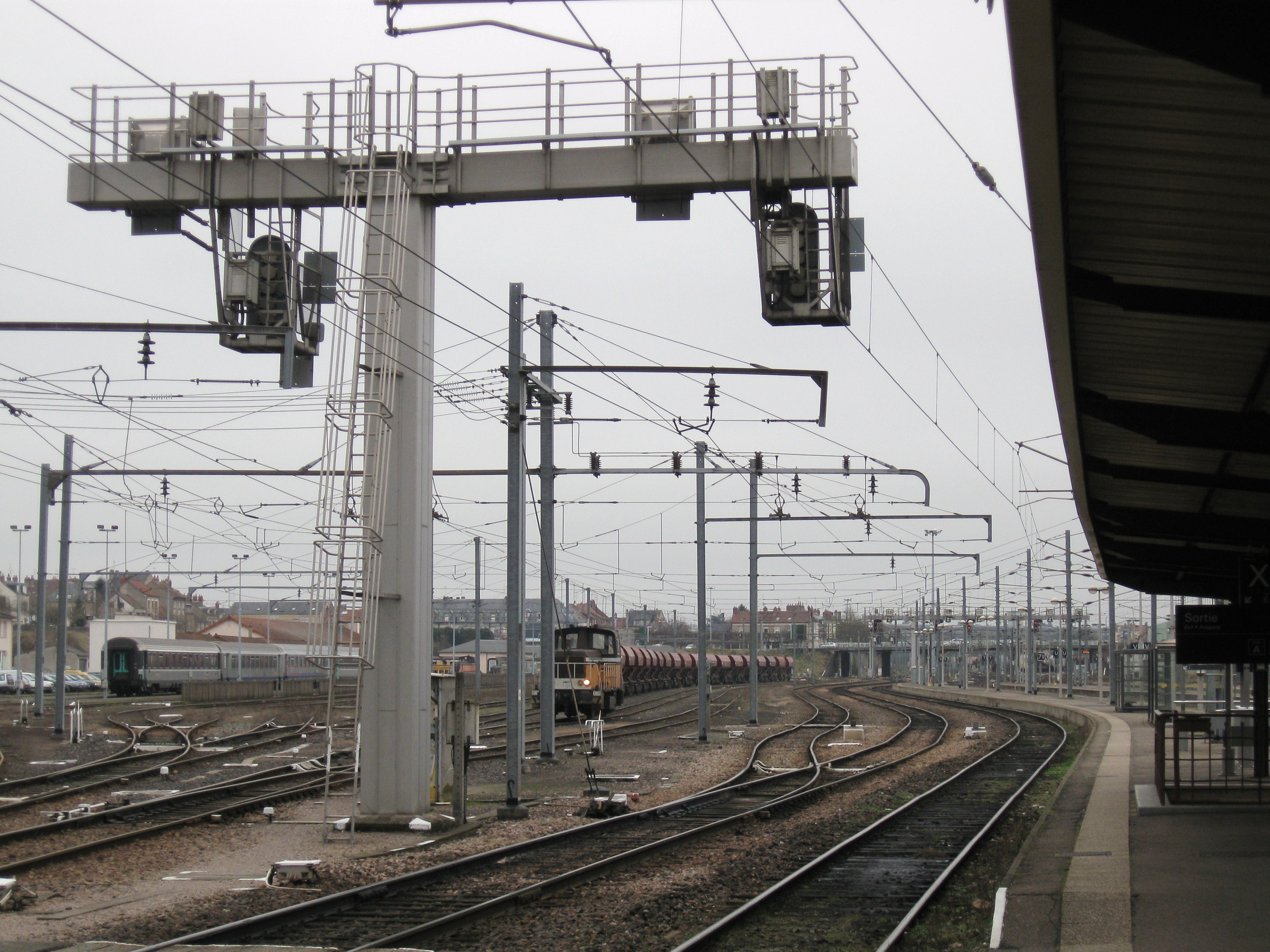
The back of the station, where there are some yards

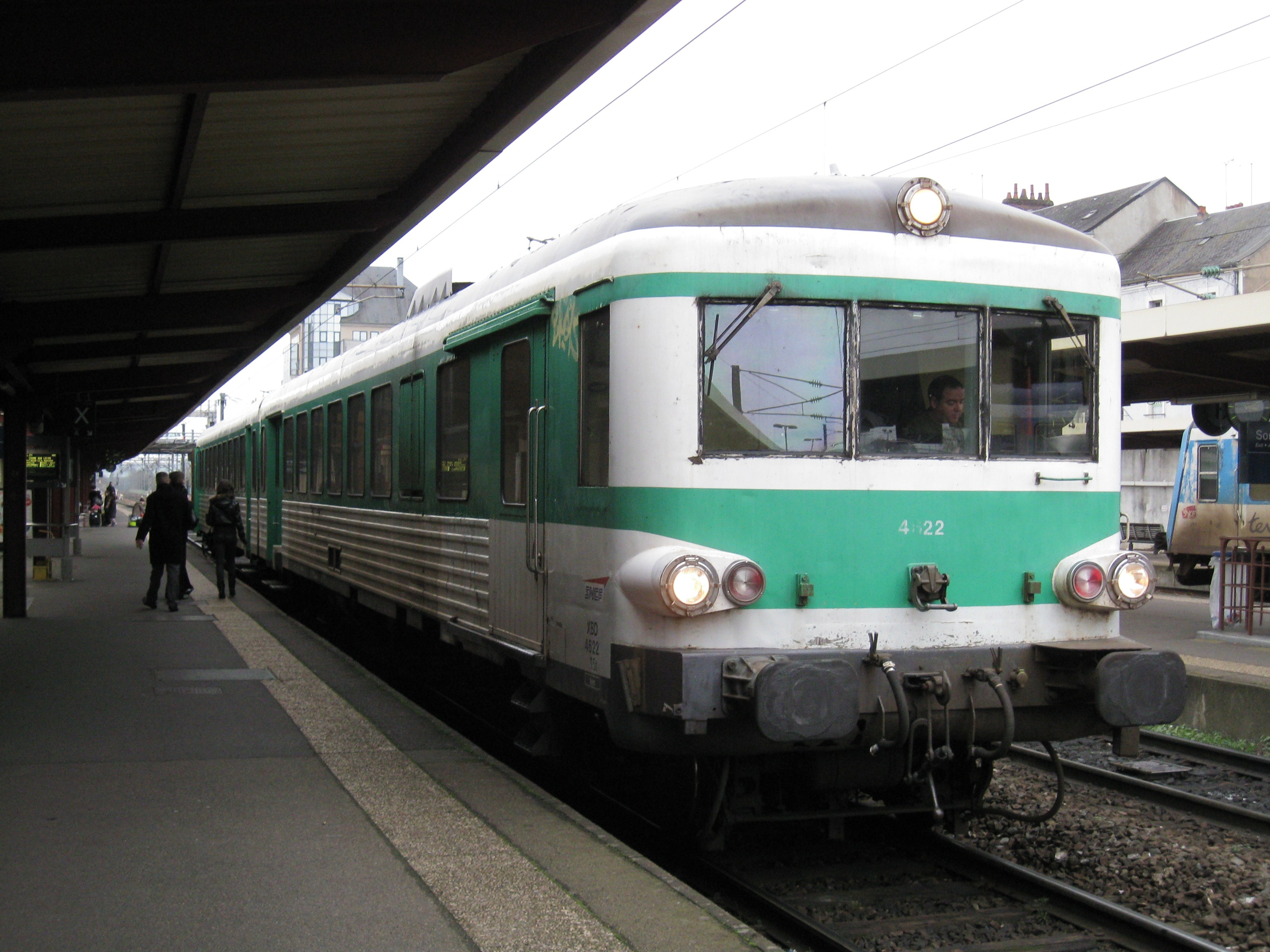
An X4500 train at the station in 2009
