= Clermont-Ferrand station =

Railway station in Clermont-Ferrand, France

Coordinates: 45°46′43″N 3°6′3″E

Clermont-Ferrand
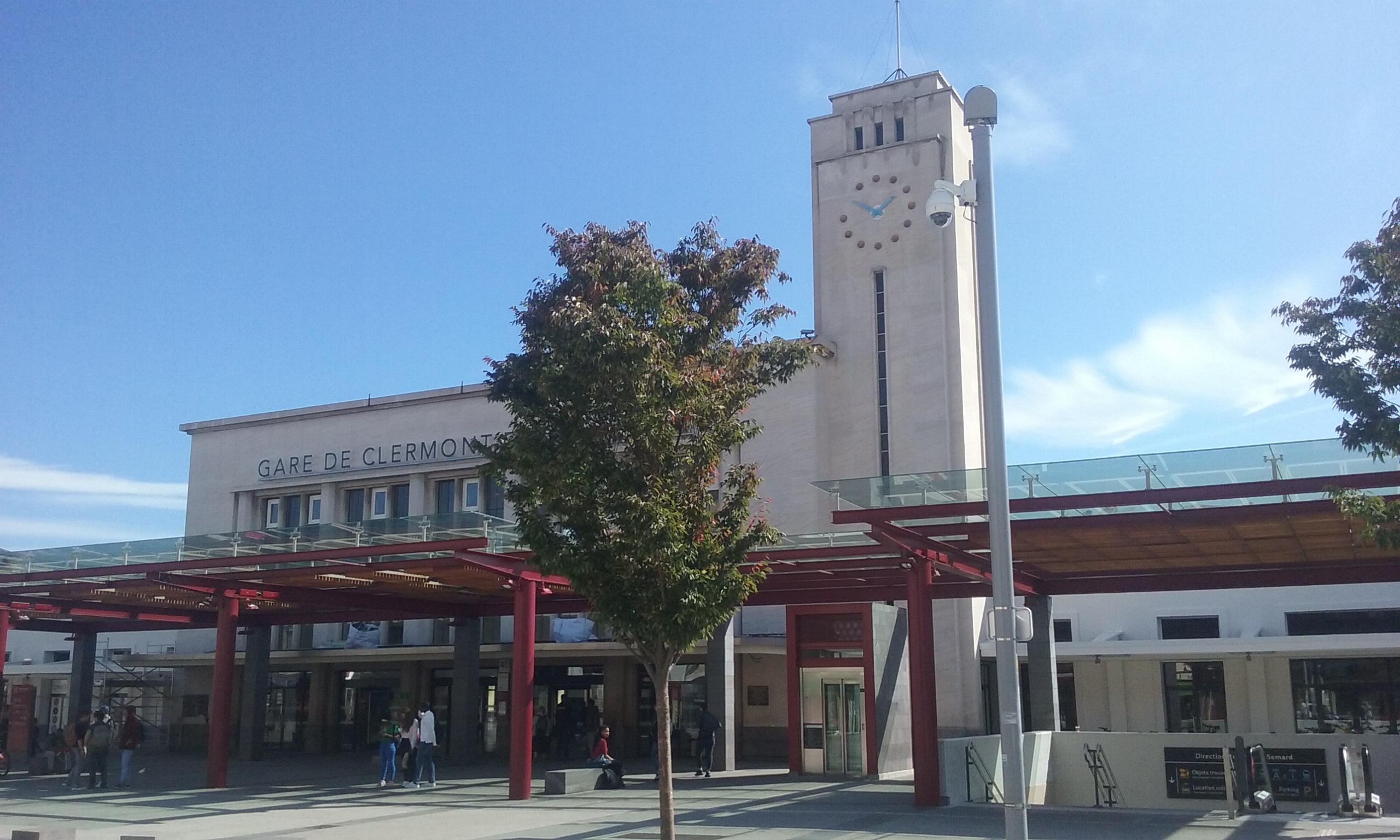
- Main entrance of the station in 2017.

General information
- Location: Clermont-Ferrand, Puy-de-Dôme, Auvergne-Rhône-Alpes; France
- Lines: Saint-Germain-des-Fossés–Nîmes, Clermont-Ferrand-Saint-Just, Eygurande-Merlines-Clermont-Ferrand
- Platforms: 9
- Tracks: 11 (+ Depot)

History
- Opened: 7 May 1855

Passengers
- 2024: 4,922,516
Services
Preceding station	SNCF	Following station
Riom-Châtel-Guyon towards Paris-Bercy	Intercités	Terminus
Terminus	Intercités	Issoire towards Béziers
Preceding station	TER Auvergne-Rhône-Alpes	Following station
Terminus	6	Riom-Châtel-Guyon towards Lyon-Perrache
Terminus	11	Aulnat-Aéroport towards Thiers
Riom-Châtel-Guyon towards Nevers	14	Terminus
Gerzat towards Montluçon	16	Terminus
Terminus	26	Clermont-La Pardieu towards Le Puy-en-Velay
Terminus	65	Clermont-La Pardieu towards Aurillac
Clermont-La Rotonde towards Volvic	84	Terminus
Preceding station	TER Occitanie	Following station
Terminus	27	Clermont-La Pardieu towards Nîmes
Location

Clermont-Ferrand station (French: Gare de Clermont-Ferrand) is a French railway station, located on the Saint-Germain-des-Fossés–Nîmes railway in Clermont-Ferrand, Auvergne-Rhône-Alpes, France. The station is served by Intercités (Intercity) and TER (Regional) services operated by SNCF.

== Location ==
The station is located on the Saint-Germain-des-Fossés–Nîmes, Clermont-Ferrand-Saint-Just-sur-Loire and Eygurande-Merlines-Clermont-Ferrand railways.

== History ==
The station opened in 1855 following the extension of the line from Gannat. The station of Clermont-Ferrand has been renovated between 2010 and 2018.

== Train services ==
The following services call at Clermont-Ferrand as of 2022:

- intercity services (Intercités) Paris - Nevers - Moulins - Vichy - Riom - Clermont-Ferrand
- intercity services (Intercités) Clermont-Ferrand - Millau - Béziers
- local service (TER Auvergne-Rhône-Alpes) Nevers - Moulins - Saint-Germain-des-Fossés - Vichy - Clermont-Ferrand
- local service (TER Auvergne-Rhône-Alpes) Volvic - Clermont-Ferrand
- local service (TER Auvergne-Rhône-Alpes) Montluçon - Gannat - Clermont-Ferrand
- local service (TER Auvergne-Rhône-Alpes) Clermont-Ferrand - Issoire - Neussargues - Aurillac
- local service (TER Auvergne-Rhône-Alpes) Clermont-Ferrand - Issoire - Brioude - Le Puy-en-Velay
- local service (TER Auvergne-Rhône-Alpes) Clermont-Ferrand - Thiers
- local service (TER Auvergne-Rhône-Alpes) Clermont-Ferrand - Vichy - Roanne - Lyon
- local service (TER Occitanie) Clermont-Ferrand - Brioude - Langeac - Génolhac - Alès - Nîmes

== See also ==
- List of SNCF stations in Auvergne-Rhône-Alpes
