= Bærumsmarka =

- Forest
- Location in Akershus Bærumsmarka (Norway)
- Coordinates: 59°58′46″N 10°31′17″E
- Country: Norway
- Region: Østlandet
- County: Akershus
- Municipality: Bærum
- Time zone: UTC+01:00 (CET)
  - Summer (DST): UTC+02:00 (CEST)

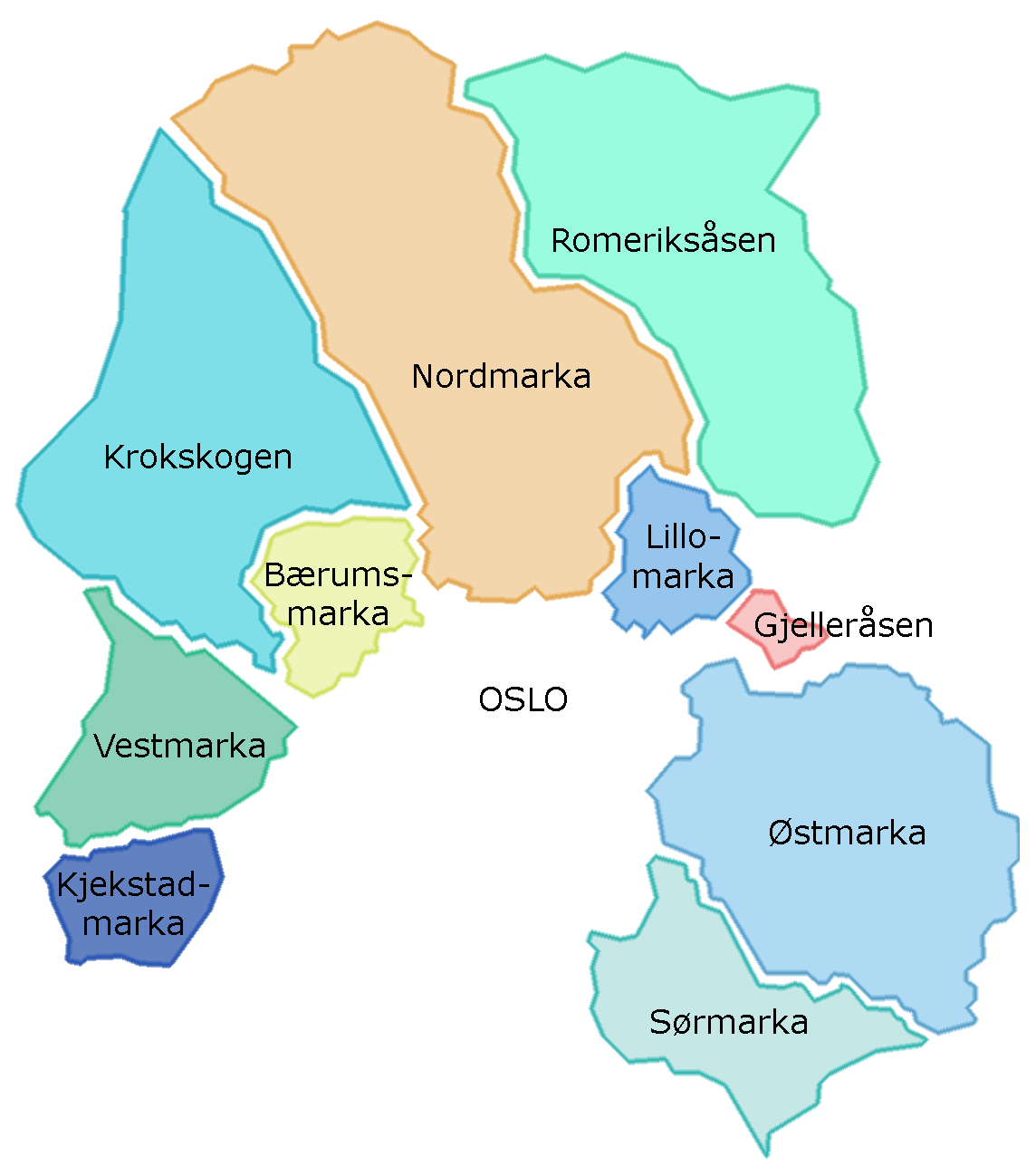
Bærumsmarka forms part of Oslomarka

Bærumsmarka is a forested recreational area located outside Oslo, Norway. The area constitutes part of Oslomarka and is bordered by Krokskogen and Nordmarka.

Bærumsmarka is in the Bærum municipality of Akershus. It is situated between the valleys of Lommedalen and Sørkedalen. Bærumsmarka is laced by over 70 square kilometres of marked hiking, riding and ski trails. The highest point in the landscape is Tjæregrashøgda (485 m). The area was a site of coal mining in connection with an iron network operation from the mid-1600s to the mid-1800s. The association Bærumsmarkas Venner was formed in 1985 to preserve the area against future development.

== Other sources ==
- Christensen, Trygve (1988) Bærumsmarka før og nå (Oslo: Gyldendal) ISBN 82-05-17714-7
