= Damtjern (Ringerike) =

Body of water

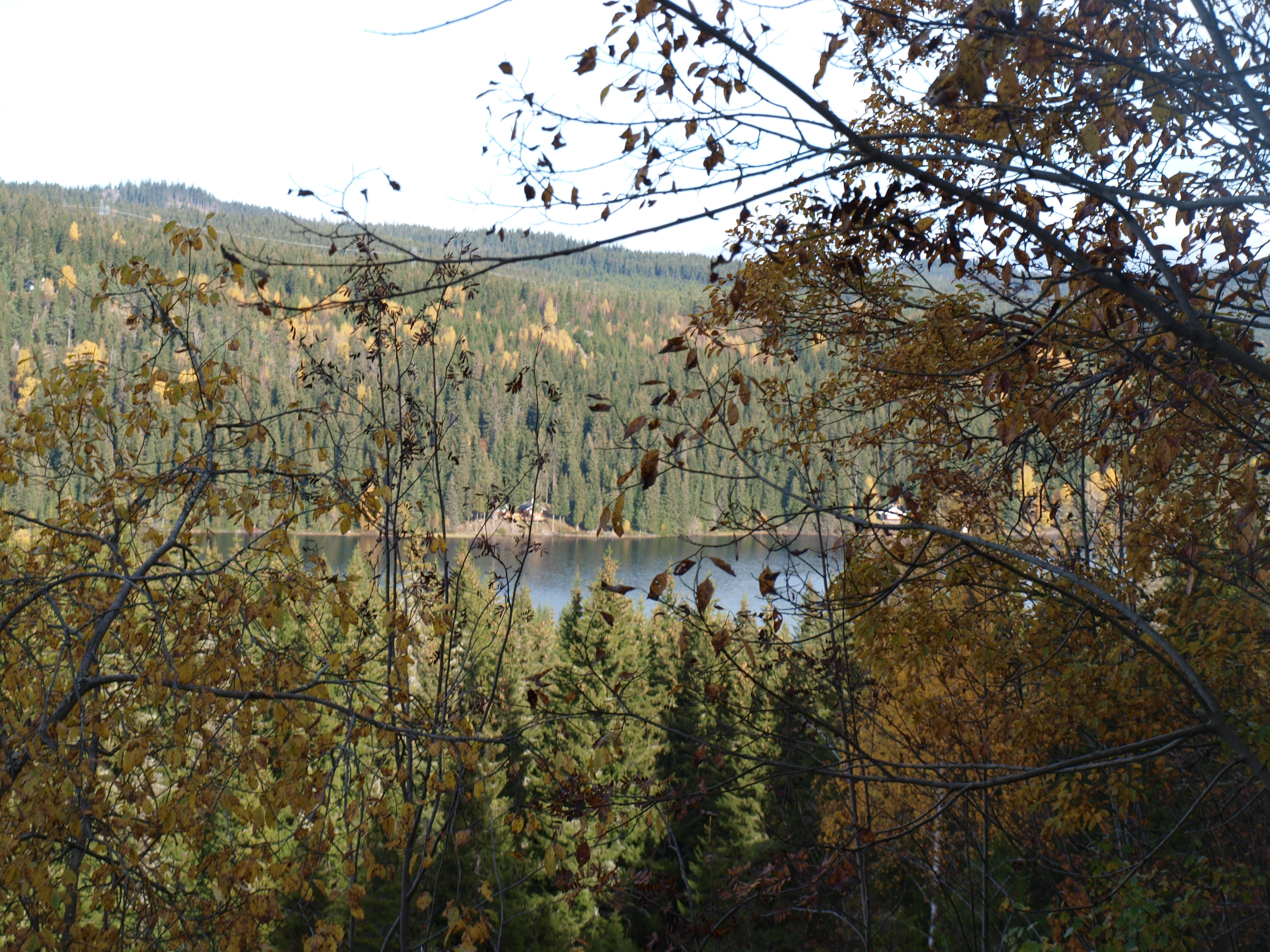

- Location within Norway
- Location: Krokskogen, Ringerike, Norway
- Coordinates: 60°07′36″N 10°24′54″E

Damtjern is a small lake in Ringerike in Buskerud county, Norway. Damtjern is situated within the Krokskogen forested area.

There is a road up to Damtjern from Stubbdal, a village situated at the head of Åsa in Ringerike. Damtjern is a setting-off point for walking in the area, both during summer and winter. Between Stubbdal and Damtjern there are old tracks to the Conveyor in Asa (Kjerraten i Åsa). At the Conveyor Museum (Kjerratmuseet) it is possible to learn how the Swedish engineer Samuel Bagge (1774–1814) made it possible for Peder Anker of Bogstad to move timber to Damtjern from Steinsfjorden, before floating it down to the Sørkedalselva river in Sørkedalen.

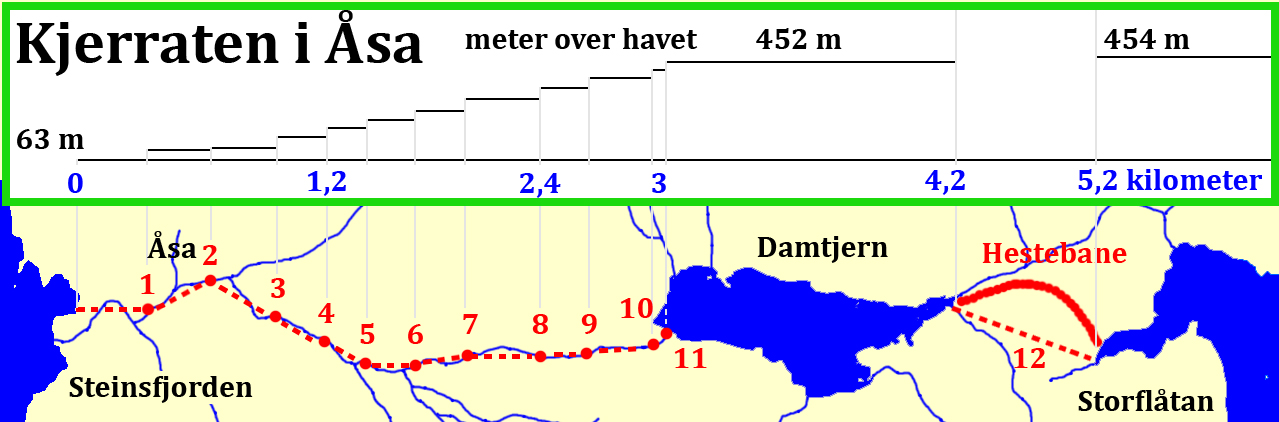
