= Braathens SAFE Flight 239 =

1972 aviation accident

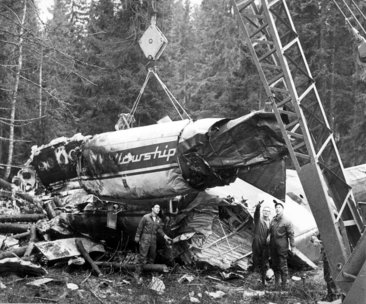
- Salvage of the wreck

Accident
- Date: 23 December 1972
- Summary: Controlled flight into terrain due to navigational error
- Site: Vestmarka, Asker, Norway; 59°51′57″N 10°20′21″E

Aircraft
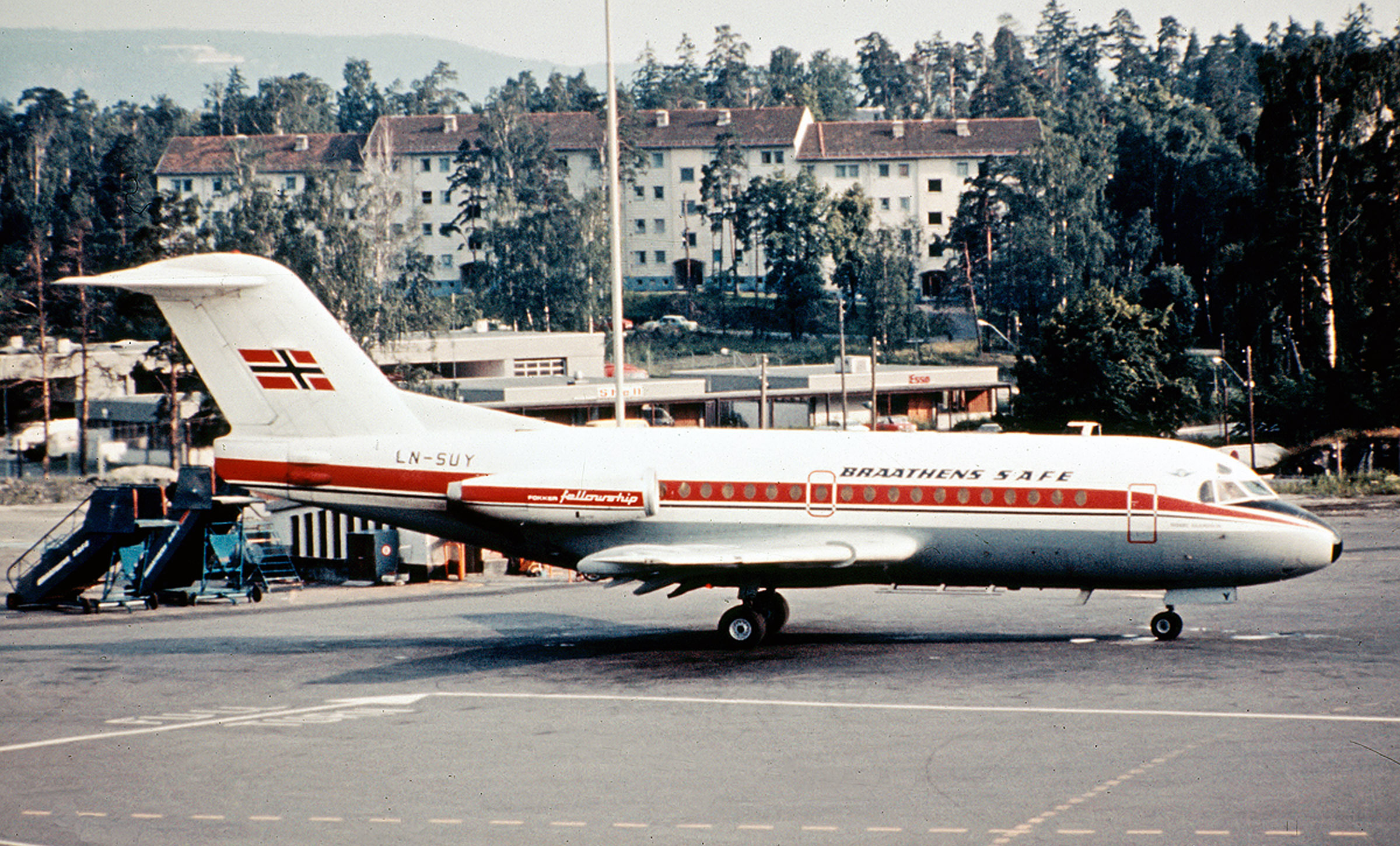
- LN-SUY, the aircraft involved in the accident, seen in August 1972
- Aircraft type: Fokker F28 Fellowship 1000
- Aircraft name: Sverre Sigurdsson
- Operator: Braathens SAFE
- IATA flight No.: BU239
- ICAO flight No.: BRA239
- Call sign: BRAATHENS 239
- Registration: LN-SUY
- Flight origin: Ålesund Airport, Vigra
- Destination: Oslo Airport, Fornebu
- Occupants: 45
- Passengers: 42
- Crew: 3
- Fatalities: 40
- Injuries: 5
- Survivors: 5

Braathen SAFE Flight 239, also known as the Asker Accident (Norwegian: Asker-ulykken), was a controlled flight into terrain of a Fokker F28 Fellowship into Vestmarka in Asker, Norway, on 23 December 1972 at 16:33. The Braathens SAFE aircraft was en route on a scheduled flight from Ålesund Airport, Vigra and crashed during approach to Oslo Airport, Fornebu. Forty of the forty-five people on board the aircraft died, making it the deadliest civil aviation accident in Norway until Vnukovo Airlines Flight 2801 in 1996. According to Norwegian newspaper Dagbladet on 23 December 1992, a Danish citizen died of late complications in 1976.

The pilots took a short-cut during approach on runway 06 at Fornebu. Combined with false signals from the instrument landing system (ILS), this caused the pilots to misunderstand their location. This in turn led them to take an incorrect landing path, causing the plane to hit ground in a hilly area. The rescue operation was initiated almost immediately, but it took six and a half hours to find the aircraft. Three years later, the investigation commission concluded that various measures should be put in place to improve navigation, to avoid similar situations in which pilots could experience any confusion or misunderstanding about their location.

== Flight ==
The accident aircraft, a Fokker F28 Fellowship 1000 had aircraft registration LN-SUY and was named Sverre Sigurdsson. It was equipped with two Rolls-Royce Spey Jr. 555-15 engines. Braathens SAFE was the launch customer of the F28 and Sverre Sigurdsson was the first F28 to fly in revenue service, in early 1969. By 1972 Braathens had six such aircraft in its fleet. The airline had seen some operational difficulties as an early operator of the aircraft type. LN-SUY had serial number 11011 and had at the time of the accident flown 8,228 hours and had conducted 16,710 cycles. It had a capacity of sixty-five passengers, and was insured with Norsk Flyforsikringspool.

Flight 239 was a scheduled service from Ålesund Airport, Vigra to Oslo Airport, Fornebu, estimated to take 45 minutes. It was marginally delayed when it departed Vigra at 16:00 with a crew of three and forty-two passengers, including four babies. As the flight was the day before Christmas Eve, it was largely used by people traveling home or to visit family for Christmas and people heading abroad for Christmas holiday. The captain had been employed by Braathens for sixteen years, the last ten as captain. There was one member of cabin crew. As it was a short domestic flight, only soda pop and beer were served, not coffee.

== Crash ==
The norm for landing at Fornebu was to rendezvous with a way point, RUMBA, and conduct a fifteen-degree left turn for about half a minute. The aircraft would then be aligned with runway 06 and could glide down following the instrument landing system (ILS). This maneuver would nominally take place at an altitude of 1,100 meters (3,500 ft). However, in clear weather the pilots often opted for a short-cut to reach the approach path more quickly. Because of the topography, it was possible that the ILS beams would deviate up to twenty-five degrees, which could cause the pilots to turn the aircraft too early and would cause the aircraft to fly over a range of hills on the wrong heading. This was a known fault with the system and pilots would therefore check the direction of the radio beacon at Asker to ensure they were in the correct position. This short-cut was carried out by Flight 239.

The pilots therefore had full control of the aircraft, but were not aware of their location at the time of the impact. They carried out their turn about 10 nautical miles (19 km; 12 mi) too early. At this time the captain was having a private conversation concerning Christmas celebrations with the air traffic controller. The aircraft descended below the lowest safe altitude and lowered its gear and flaps as if they were on the nominal bearing. Sverre Sigurdsson was flying a course too far east and was possibly flying through strong winds. The impact took place at 16:33 close to the lake of Asdøltjern in Vestmarka. The aircraft was 4 nautical miles (7 km; 5 mi) off course in darkness and fog.

== Rescue ==
Several people survived the impact, but only seven were found alive. They were all injured and in shock. One of the survivors assisted two others away from the wreck, which was burning, and they all rallied a distance away from the wreck. They stated to the press afterwards that they were all apathetic and in shock, and that none of them thought about the possibilities to search for help. Also, none of them knew where they were. They heard the search being carried out by helicopter and were therefore aware that they were being searched for. Two of the initial survivors later died, bringing the death toll to forty.

Fornebu Air Traffic Control noticed that the aircraft disappeared from their radar and notified Asker and Bærum Police District at 16:36 about a potential crash. Fornebu contacted Drammen Police District at 16:57 and asked for a search in the area around the farm at Solli. The air traffic control estimated the area they believed the aircraft must have been in. Despite their estimate for the crash site being accurate, they gave the police an incorrect sector to search in. Asker and Bærum Police District dispatched two patrols at 17:00, one from Asker to Solli and one from Sandvika to Nikebatteriet. The patrol from Asker passed almost right by the crash site and stopped to investigate, but found no indications of the wreckage. At 17:13 the police requested that crew be allocated to Nikebatteriet to conduct a search and rescue operation. The overall coordination was carried out by the Joint Rescue Coordination Centre of Southern Norway (JRCC SN).

By 18:30 a base of operations had been established at Solli and thirty people were searching for the aircraft. At that time, the crash site was outside the defined area of search. The operation was also made more difficult as peaks and high ground were prioritized, while the aircraft was in fact located on a wooded gentle slope. Because of the holiday season, people were on leave and it took time for the police to dispatch sufficient crew to carry out a proper search operation. At 19:00, the second base of operations was established at the farm at Rustand. Another thirty people were sent out to look for the wreckage and additional crew were called in. At 20:30 the police and air traffic control started to question if search area was correct and therefore decided to expand it. This placed the crash site just within the search perimeter. A second expansion of the sector took place at 22:00. By this time more than a thousand people, professionals and volunteers, were participating.

The wreckage was found at 22:50 by a volunteer group, who had walked along the estimated route of the aircraft. Five minutes later crew from Sylling Red Cross Search and Rescue Corps arrived at the site. At this time the operations center was alerted about the find and JRCC SN was alerted at 23:07. A helicopter was dispatched from Fornebu at 23:24 and landed at Solli at 23:41 to pick up a medical doctor. It continued to the crash site, guided by the car lights of the volunteer search crew. It picked up the badly wounded and used two trips to bring them to Solli, where they were sent by ambulance to hospital. Two more wounded were carried to ambulances which had driven to the site. The search and rescue operation officially concluded at 23:59.

== Investigation ==
An investigation commission was appointed, consisted of three regular members, led by Lieutenant-Colonel Eirik Sandberg, Police Inspector Johan Fr. Kielland and Pilot Eivind Veierstad, in addition to their secretary, Hans Georg Andersen. Arne Viik, an expert in aviation navigation, was appointed for the individual investigation. The commission's regular members were contacted at 17:00 on the day of the accident and they started their work immediately. The wreck was taken to Fornebu for investigation, the flight recorder was sent to Copenhagen and the altimeters were sent to the United States. They interviewed several hundred people, flew the flight with a similar aircraft in the same light and weather conditions and by February 1973 had collected more than two and a half meters of notes and documents. Because of the navigational errors, the commission test-flew the route several times. When the beacon was transmitting false signals and they followed them without correlating by other means, the commission's test flights gave a course that would have resulted in a crash, had they not aborted.

After a year, one of the commission's members was replaced, as his tenure was finished. This delayed the work as his replacement had to go through all the findings to catch up. The duration of the investigation was criticized by the press and next of kin, but the commission stated that it was necessary with a prescribed degree of diligence in the matter. An issue of particular interest was the ILS system at Fornebu, which would under given circumstances produce false signals. The commission found no way of terminating the shortcomings. By August 1975 a preliminary report was sent to the involved parties. Despite promises of immediate release, the publication was postponed further to sort out further details. The final draft was given to the Ministry of Transport and Communications on 18 December. The report went public on 4 January 1976.

The commission concluded that the probable cause of the accident was a navigational error which must have taken place before the aircraft had descended to 1,100 meters (3,500 ft). No technical faults were found with the aircraft. The report stated that there were some shortcomings in crew procedures: a measurement for direction control had been moved to a less visible location, a radio compass was set at the wrong frequency so it received bearings from Lahti, a conversation related to the holidays with air traffic control and that the captain was not as rested as he could have been according to regulations. The commission could not find that the weather or the wind was a contributing cause, although the darkness and fog could have hindered the crew from gaining a visual cue to their location.

The bulk of the report was dedicated to the navigational aids at Fornebu. The report underlined that false signals from the radio beacon were an important underlying cause. It noted that the beacon for runway 01 interfered with that for 06 and that up to three false signals could be transmitted. The commission recommended airlines enforce routines which ensured that multiple systems for determining position and bearing always be used, as a single system would never be reliable. It also recommended an extra radio beacon be installed in Drammen to aid approach to runway 06 and that airlines in the meantime not rely solely on radio beacons during approach to 06. The report also looked at the work-flow at the air traffic control. The airport had a radar system installed, but this was used solely for monitoring traffic and was not seen as a navigational aid. The commission commented that air traffic control could have prevented the accident had it recognized that the aircraft was on the wrong path and alerted the pilots. Sufficient equipment was installed, but there were no instructions for such activity.

== Aftermath ==
Flight 239 is the deadliest aviation accident on mainland Norway and second-deadliest in the entire country, only surpassed by Vnukovo Airlines Flight 2801 in 1996 in which 141 people died on the Svalbard archipelago. It was the second accident of the F28 and the first fatal accident. It remains the eleventh-deadliest F28 accident.

The deceased were sent to their home communities for burial. Twenty-five of them were from around Ålesund and were sent to Vigra via a special Boeing 737-200 flight by Braathens SAFE on 29 December. A memorial service was held at the airport before the coffins were distributed to the respective parishes. A memorial to the victims was erected near the crash sites, located along a popular skiing trail between Myggheim and Sandungen.
