= Krokskogen =

Forested area in Norway

Coordinates: 60°04′25″N 10°24′30″E

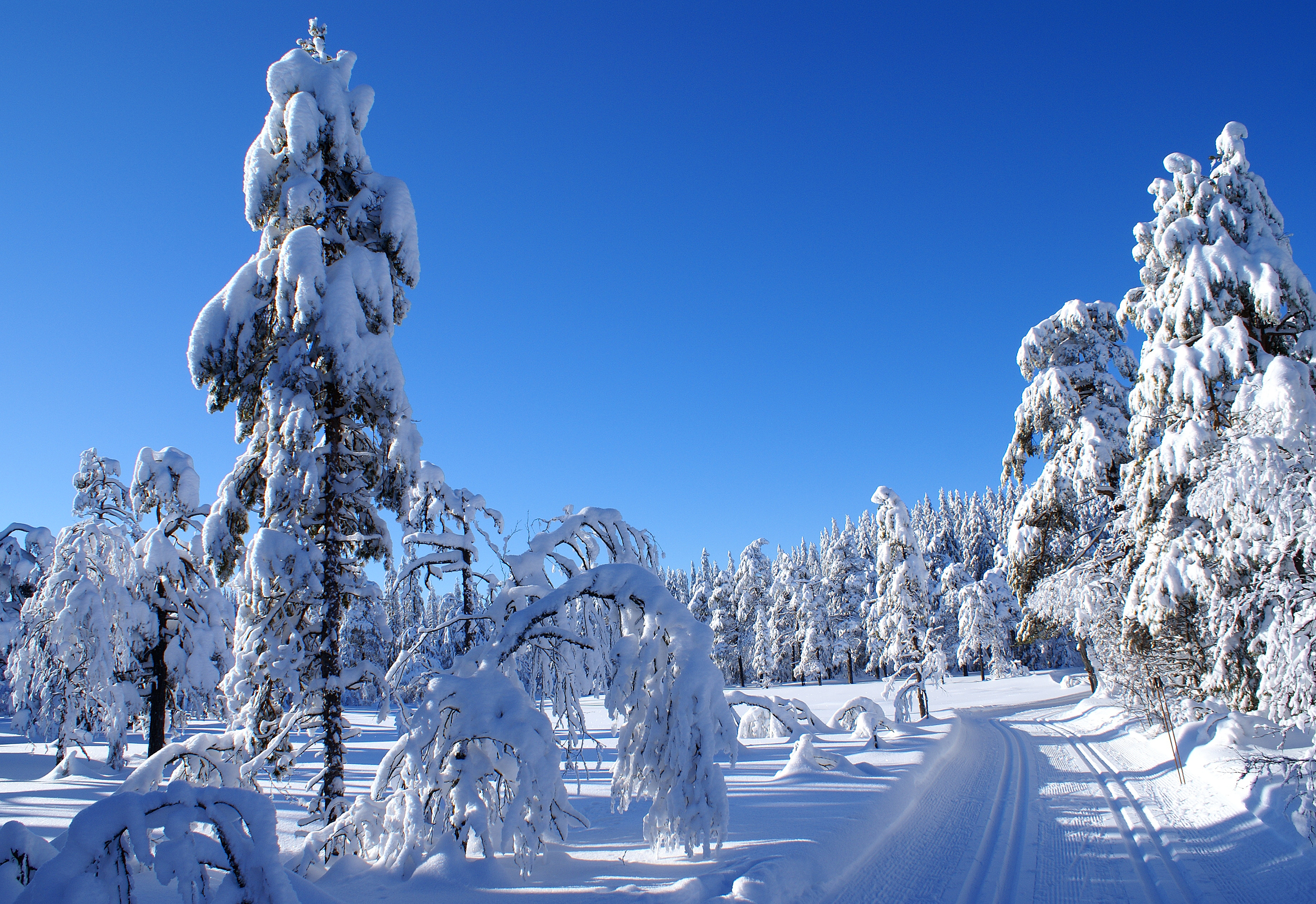
Krokskogen in winter

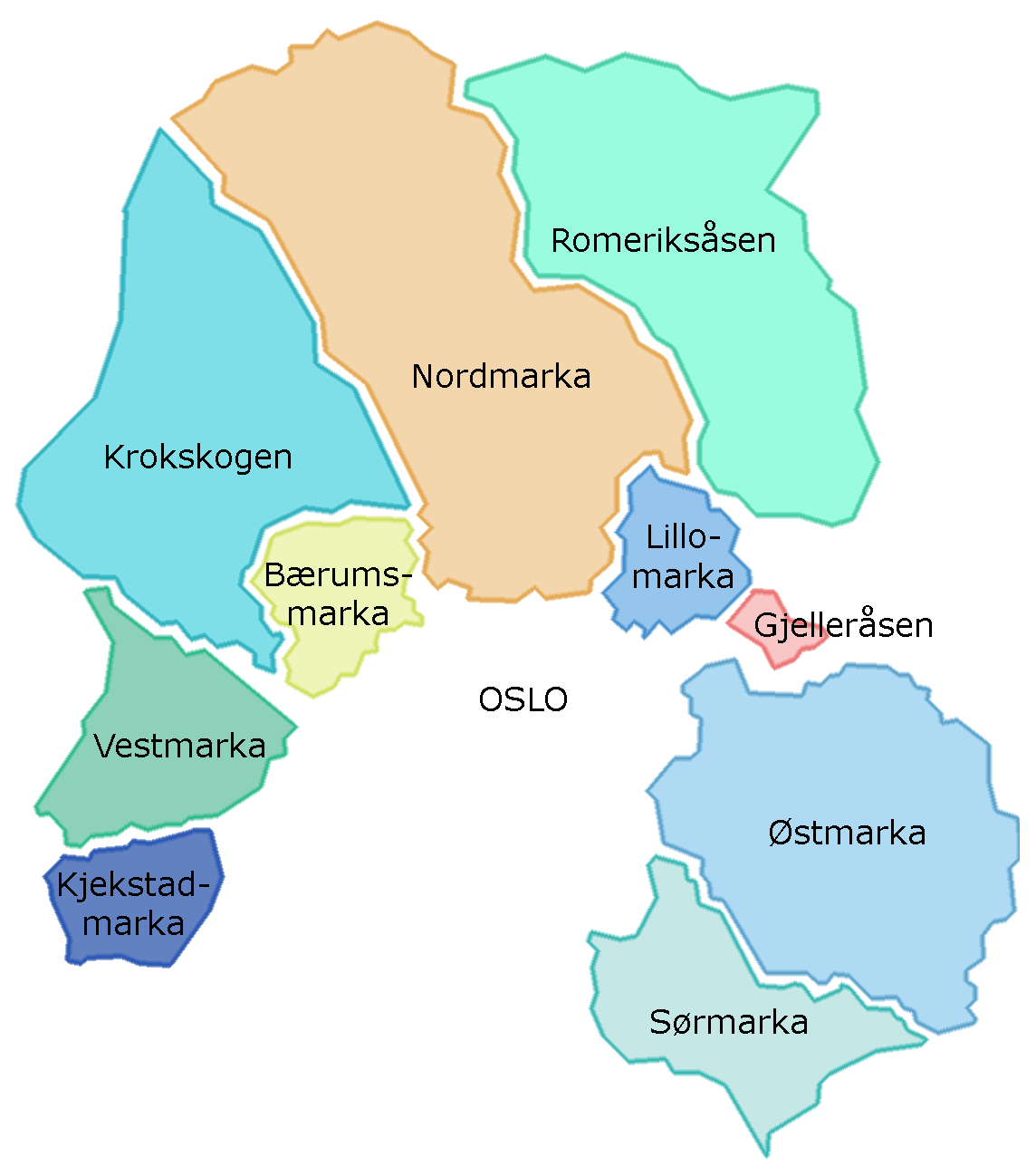
Krokskogen forms part of Oslomarka

Krokskogen is a forested area which located outside of Oslo, Norway. It is a part of Oslomarka and is situated between Bærumsmarka, Vestmarka and Nordmarka.

The wooded and hilly area of around 300 square kilometres is bordered by Oslo and by the municipalities of Ringerike, Hole and Bærum. The highest points in the landscape are Oppkuven (704 m.), Ringkollen (702 m) and Gyrihaugen (682 m). The old road through Krokskogen which opened in 1805 was part of the King's Road (Ringeriksveien) from Oslo to Bergen. It is now mostly used as a hiking trail and bridle path in season and for timber transport during the winter.

== Other sources ==
- Grimstad, Sverre (2007) Krokskogen på kryss og tvers (topografisk forl) ISBN 9788279810391
