= Åsa, Ringerike =

Village in Norway

Coordinates: 60°7′56.65″N 10°20′44.17″E

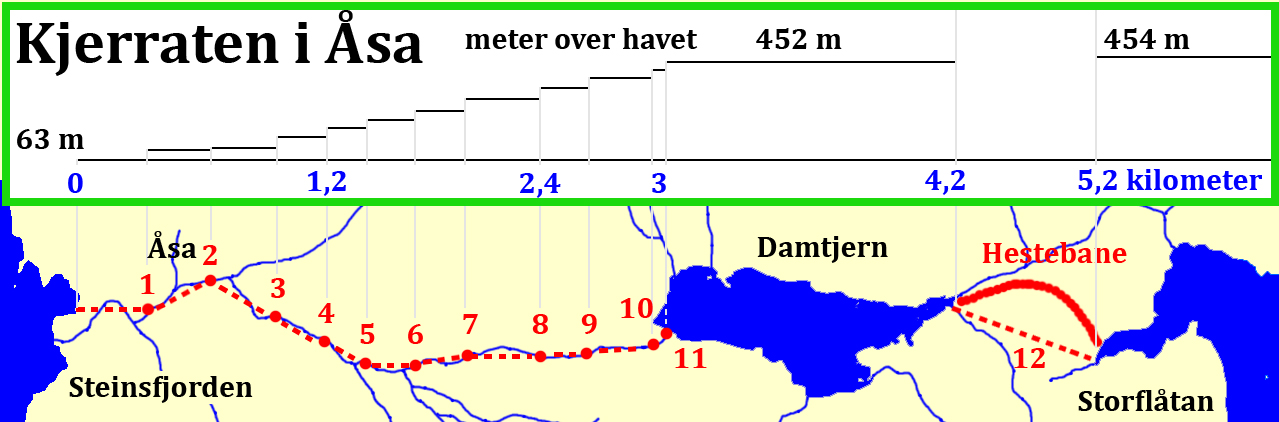

Åsa is a village in Ringerike municipality in Buskerud, Norway. Åsa is located at the upper end of Steinsfjorden, the eastern branch of lake Tyrifjorden. The village stretches from Åsaporten, the first road tunnel towards Åsa from Norderhov, and around the north end and east side of the fjord area, south to the border with Hole.

== History ==
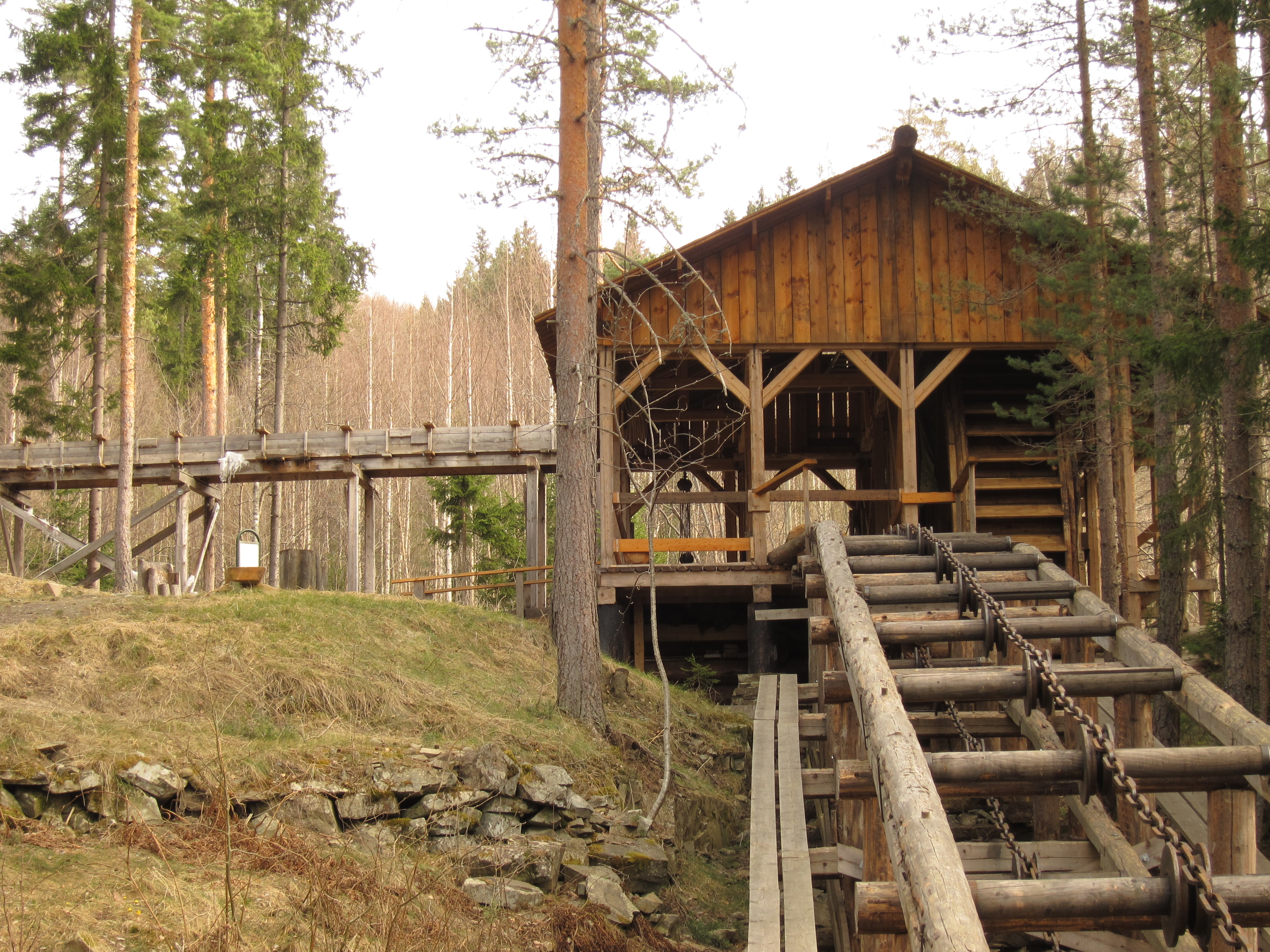
Reconstructed wheelhouse at Kjerratmuseet

Åsa was named after two farms around the mouth of the Åsaelva River. In the 19th century, the colloquial name of the village was Finnefjerdingen. Åsa has one elementary school called Steinsfjorden skole, a Montessori education school with around 22 children, residing in the same buildings and premises as the previous elementary school Vegård skole, which was shut down in 2015.

The conveyor in Asa (Kjerraten i Åsa) dates from 1807. It was a system to transport timber up a hillside. The conveyor consisted of 12 water wheels with a chain between. It had a vertical drop of 389 meters over a total length of 3900 meters. It took 3 hours to carry a timber through the conveyor, which had a capacity of approximately a log every sixth minute.

The conveyor was originally filed by Norwegian businessman Peder Anker from Bogstad, who owned large areas of forest in the area. He needed a solution to transport timber from Steinsfjorden in Åsa up to lake Damtjern and Storflåtan before floating it down to Sørkedalsvassdraget and into Sørkedalen. The system was designed by Swedish engineer Samuel Bagge (1774-1814) and was in use from 1809 until 1850.

== Kjerratmuseet ==
Kjerratmuseet is the cultural and natural history museum for Åsa. The museum, which was opened in 2006, manages the former site of Kjerraten. There are models of the original plant, a reconstructed wheelhouse and examples of the original components of cast iron and steel in a museum with permanent exhibitions. Activities include guided tour along nature trails.

== Related reading ==
- Trygve Christensen (1997) Sørkedalsvassdraget og Sørkedalen – fra Kjerraten i Åsa til Sagene ved Lysakerelva, vannveien fra Tyrifjord til Oslofjord (Forlag: T. Christensen) ISBN 9788299291613
