= Marka, Oslo =

Coordinates: 60°01′06″N 10°42′02″E

Bydel Marka
- Borough
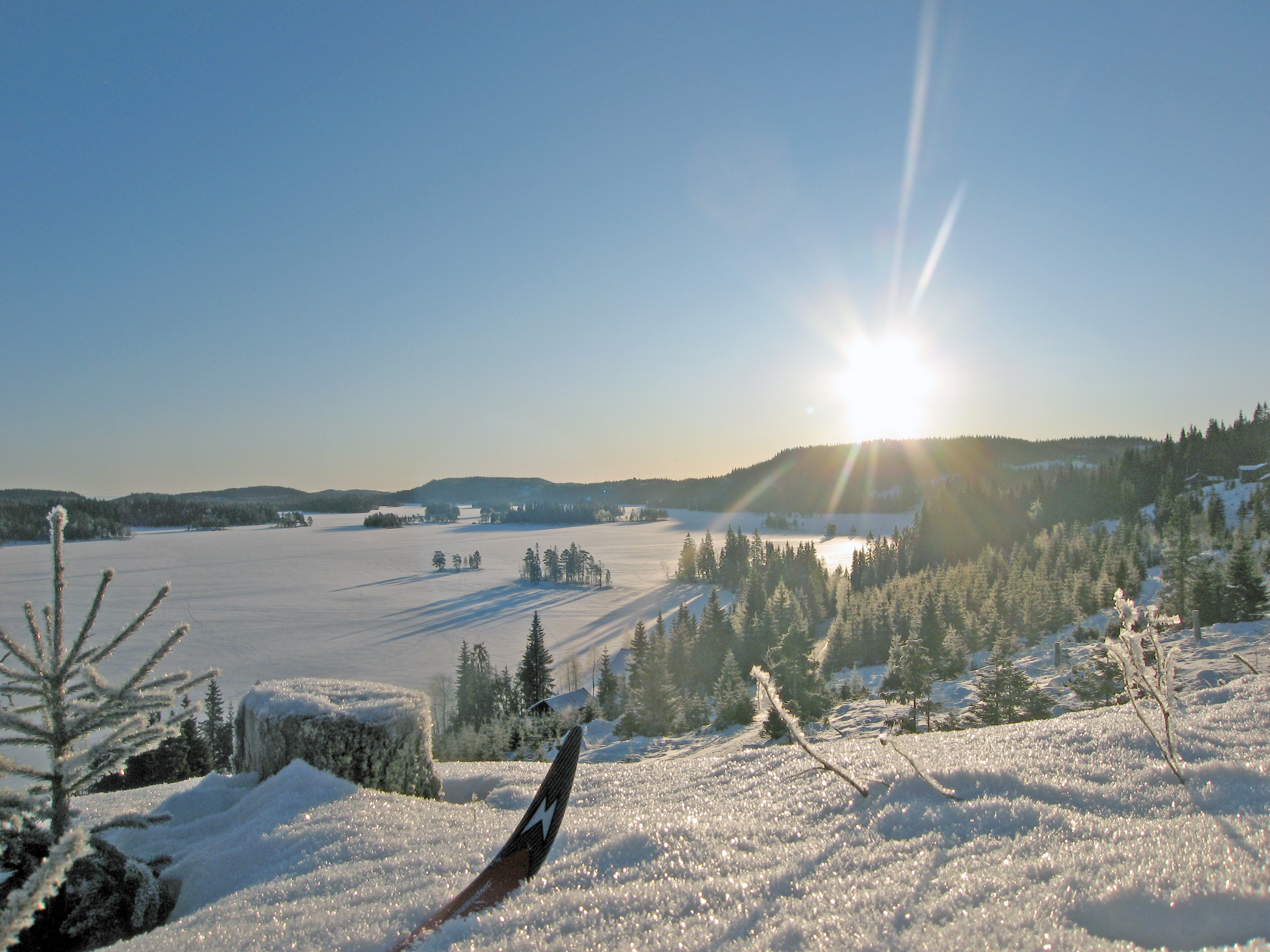
- Winter scenery at lake Øyangen, Krokskogen, Oslomarka

- Coat of arms

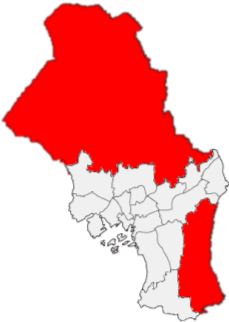
- Country: Norway
- City: Oslo

Area
  - Total: 301.1 km^{2} (116.3 sq mi)

Population (2020)
  - Total: 1,610
  - Density: 5.35/km^{2} (13.9/sq mi)
- Time zone: UTC+1 (CET)
  - Summer (DST): UTC+2 (CEST)
- ISO 3166 code: NO-030117
- Website: oslo.kommune.no

Marka is the name of the forested and hilly areas surrounding Oslo, Norway. It includes areas within the municipality of Oslo, but also large areas in Hole, Ringerike in Buskerud county and Jevnaker, Lunner, Nittedal, Bærum, Asker, and other municipalities in Akershus county. The name is actually just the finite form of mark (Norse mǫrk f) 'woodland, forest'. (See also Finnmark, Hedmark, Telemark, Marker and Aremark.)

Though not designated a borough of Oslo, it is a major recreational area for the population of Oslo, and development in the area is for the most part prohibited. Despite being used frequently by many inhabitants of Oslo, especially at weekends, the fauna of marka includes species such as Eurasian lynx, gray wolf, Eurasian beaver, moose and roe deer.

Oslomarka is the collective term usually used for all the recreational areas, comprising the contiguous areas of forest and open fields, around Oslo. Marka is the administrative name for the part of it that lies inside the city limits. Neighboring municipalities (most of which lie in Viken) do not have the same kind of administrative division as Oslo, and thus do not have any separate administrative arrangement for their parts of the area. The area within Oslo municipality is divided into two parts. The population and agricultural areas of Marka are located mainly in two valleys, Sørkedalen and Maridalen.

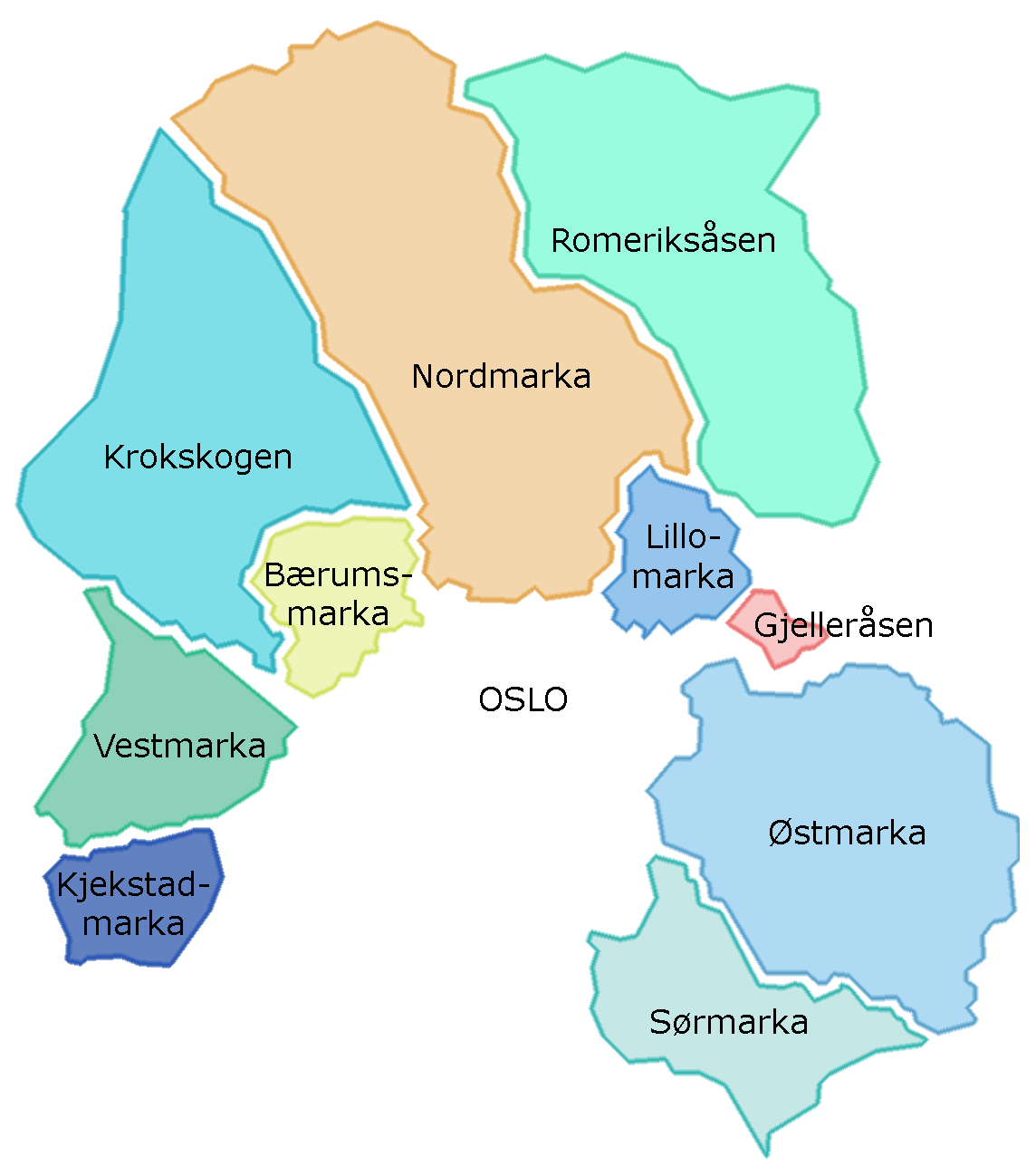
Map of Oslomarka

Oslomarka is further divided into:

- Kjekstadmarka
- Vestmarka
- Krokskogen
- Bærumsmarka
- Nordmarka
- Romeriksåsen
- Lillomarka
- Gjelleråsen
- Østmarka
- Sørmarka

Of these, Vestmarka, Kjekstadmarka, Romeriksåsene, Follomarka and Sørmarka lie almost entirely outside the city limits.
