= La Marche station =

Railway station in La Marche, France

La Marche
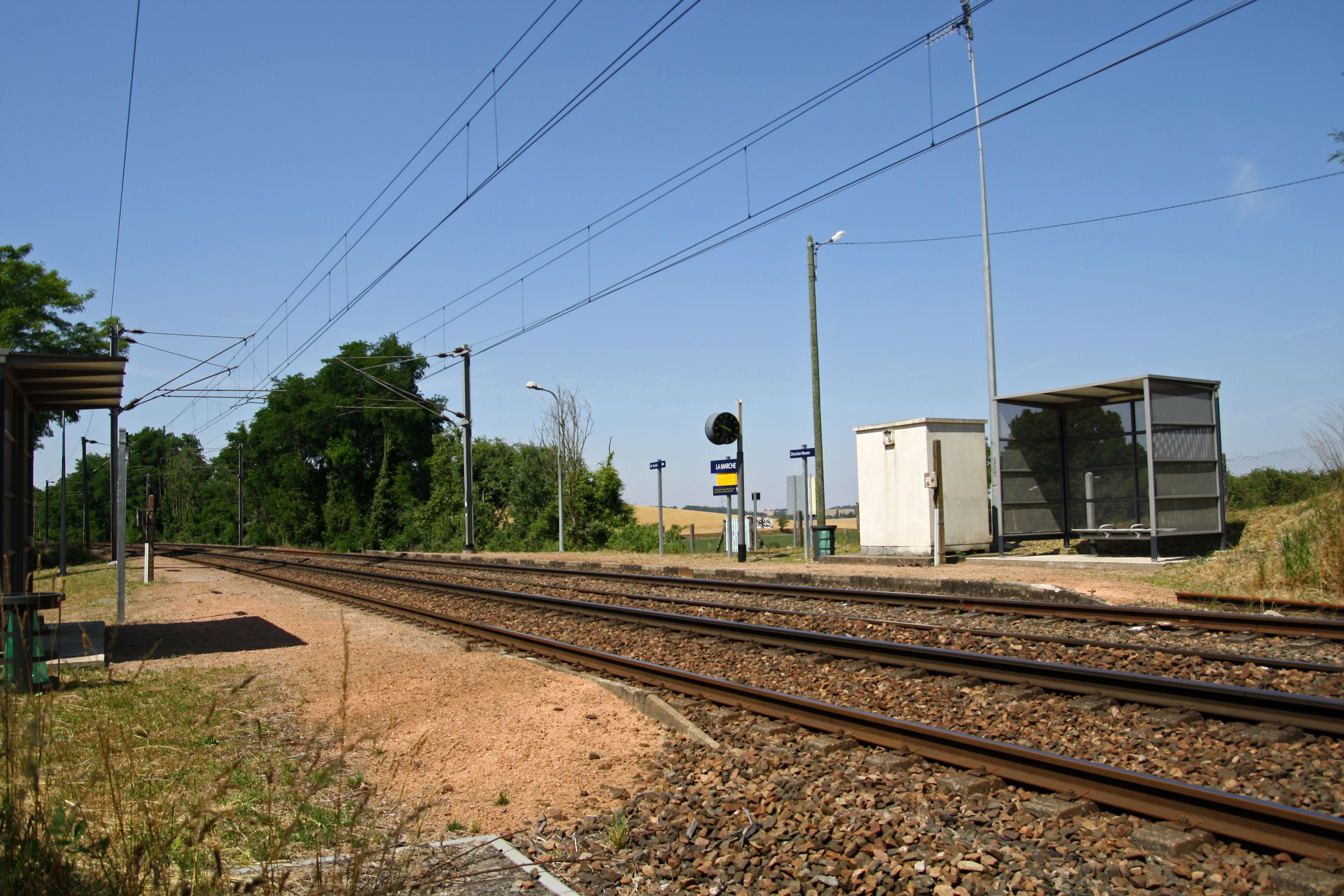
- La Marche station

General information
- Location: La Marche, Nièvre, Bourgogne-Franche-Comté; France
- Coordinates: 47°08′21″N 3°02′27″E
- Line: Moret-Lyon railway
- Platforms: 2
- Tracks: 2

Other information
- Station code: 87691394

Services
Preceding station	TER Bourgogne-Franche-Comté	Following station
La Charité towards Cosne-sur-Loire	TER	Tronsanges towards Nevers-le-Banlay
Location

La Marche is a railway station in La Marche, Bourgogne-Franche-Comté, France. The station is located on the Moret-Lyon railway. The station is served by TER (local) services operated by SNCF.

== Train services ==
The station is served by regional trains towards Cosne-sur-Loire and Nevers.
