= Tronsanges station =

Railway station in Tronsanges, France

Tronsanges
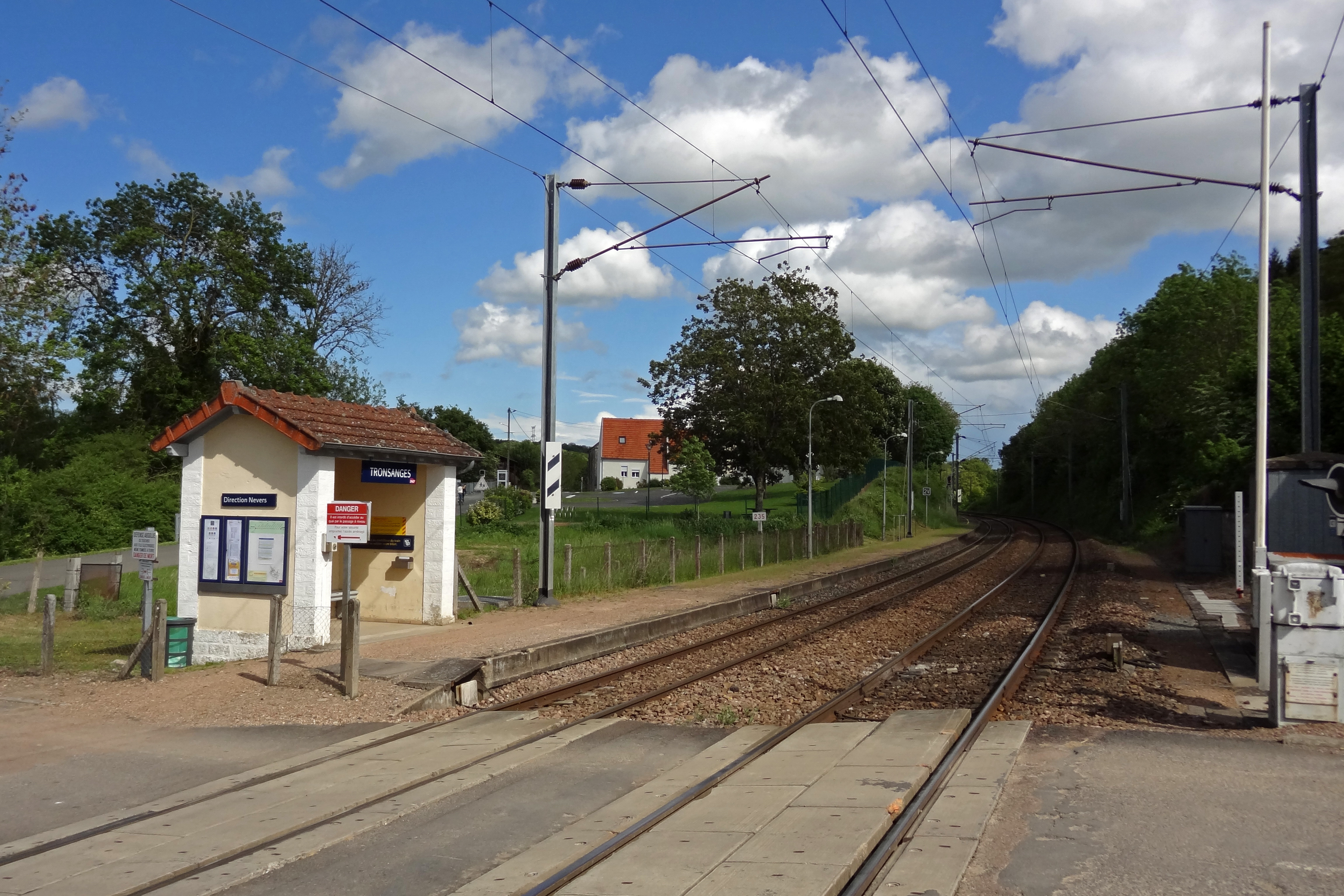
- Tronsanges station, France

General information
- Location: Tronsanges, Nièvre, Bourgogne-Franche-Comté; France
- Coordinates: 47°06′49″N 3°03′15″E
- Line: Moret-Lyon railway
- Platforms: 2
- Tracks: 2

Other information
- Station code: 87696203

Services
Preceding station	TER Bourgogne-Franche-Comté	Following station
La Marche towards Cosne-sur-Loire	TER	Pougues-les-Eaux towards Nevers-le-Banlay
Location

Tronsanges is a railway station in Tronsanges, Bourgogne-Franche-Comté, France. The station is located on the Moret-Lyon railway. The station is served by TER (local) services operated by SNCF.

== Train services ==
The following train services serve the station as of 2017:

- local service (TER Bourgogne-Franche-Comté) Cosne-sur-Loire - La Charité - Nevers
