= Tronsanges =

- Commune
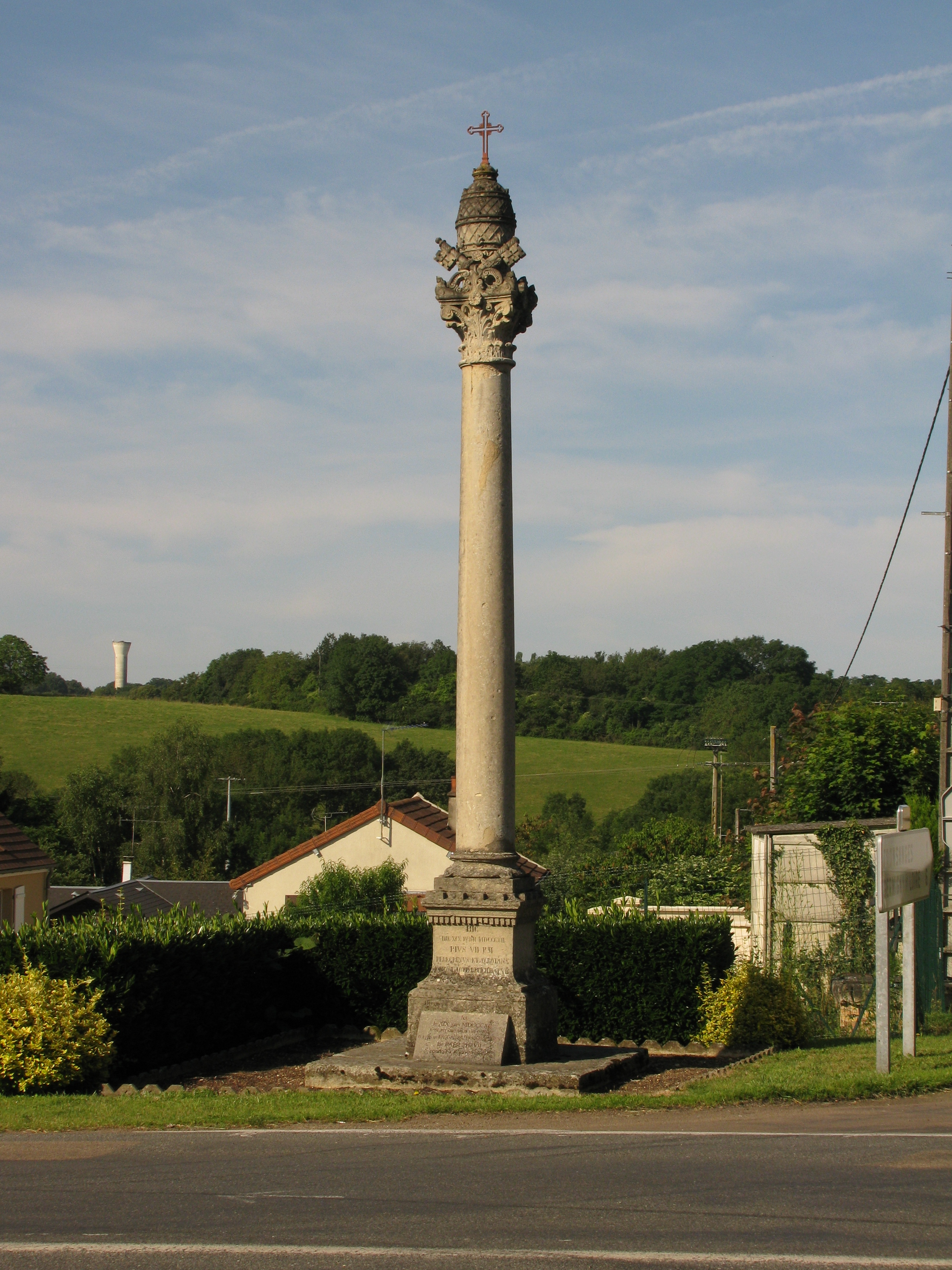
- The Cross of the Pope
- Location of Tronsanges
- Location within France Location within Bourgogne-Franche-Comté
- Coordinates: 47°06′49″N 3°03′14″E
- Country: France
- Region: Bourgogne-Franche-Comté
- Department: Nièvre
- Arrondissement: Cosne-Cours-sur-Loire
- Canton: La Charité-sur-Loire
- Intercommunality: Les Bertranges

Government
  - Mayor (2020–2026): Philippe Rondat
- Area^{1}: 8.58 km^{2} (3.31 sq mi)
- Highest elevation: 230 m (750 ft)
- Lowest elevation: 155 m (509 ft)
- Population (2023): 392
  - Density: 45.7/km^{2} (118/sq mi)
- Time zone: UTC+01:00 (CET)
  - Summer (DST): UTC+02:00 (CEST)
- INSEE/Postal code: 58298 /58400
- ^{1} French Land Register data, which excludes lakes, ponds, glaciers > 1 km^{2} (0.386 sq mi or 247 acres) and river estuaries.

Tronsanges (French pronunciation: [tʁɔ̃sɑ̃ʒ]) is a commune in the Nièvre department in central France. Tronsanges station has rail connections to Nevers and Cosne-sur-Loire.

== Demographics ==
On 1 January 2017, the estimated population was 395.

== See also ==
- Communes of the Nièvre department
