= Gjelleråsen =

Coordinates: 59°59′13.276″N 10°55′52.255″E

- Village
- Location in Akershus
- Country: Norway
- Region: Østlandet
- County: Akershus
- Municipality: Nittedal, Lillestrøm
- Time zone: UTC+01:00 (CET)
  - Summer (DST): UTC+02:00 (CEST)

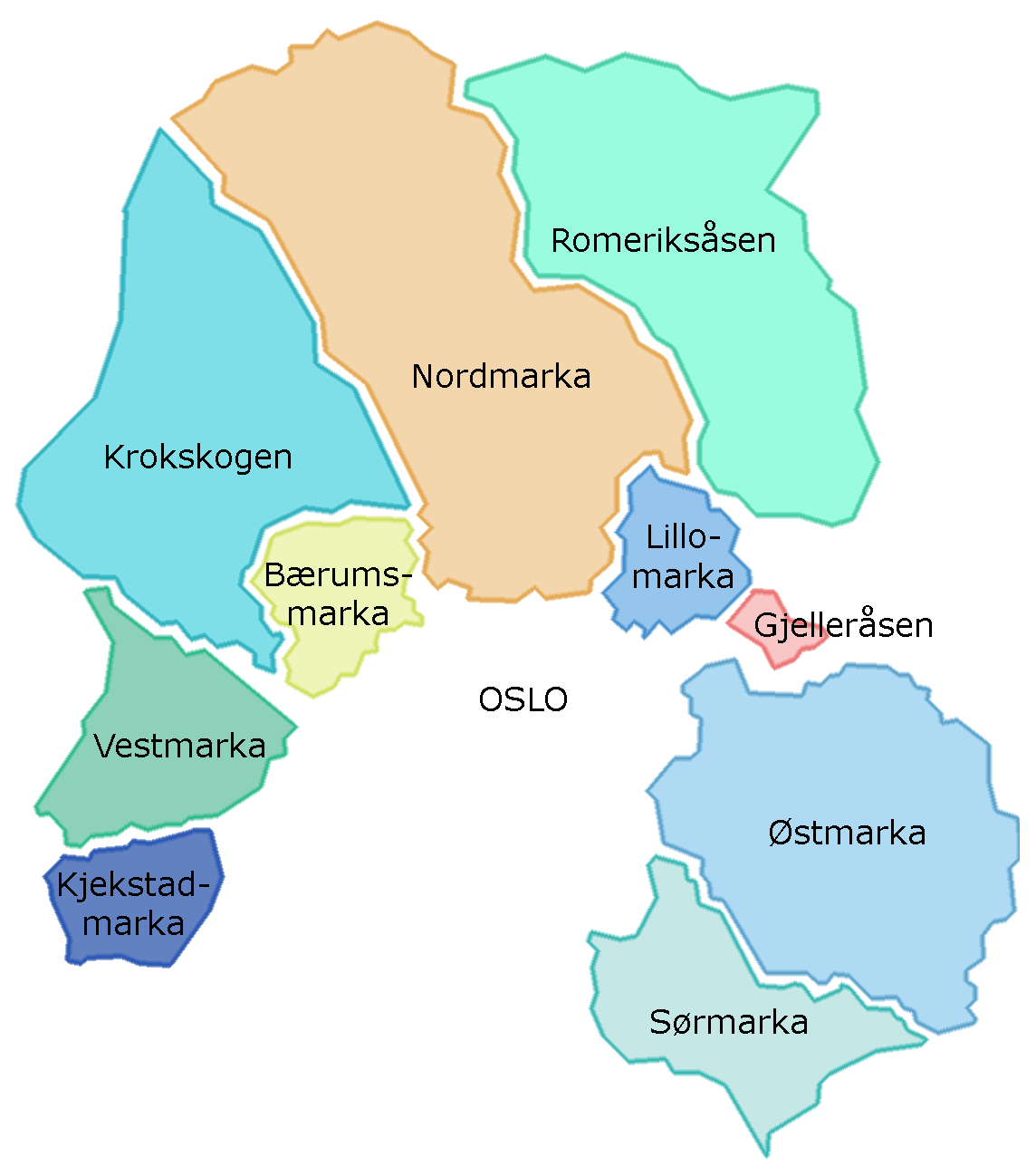
Map of Oslomarka

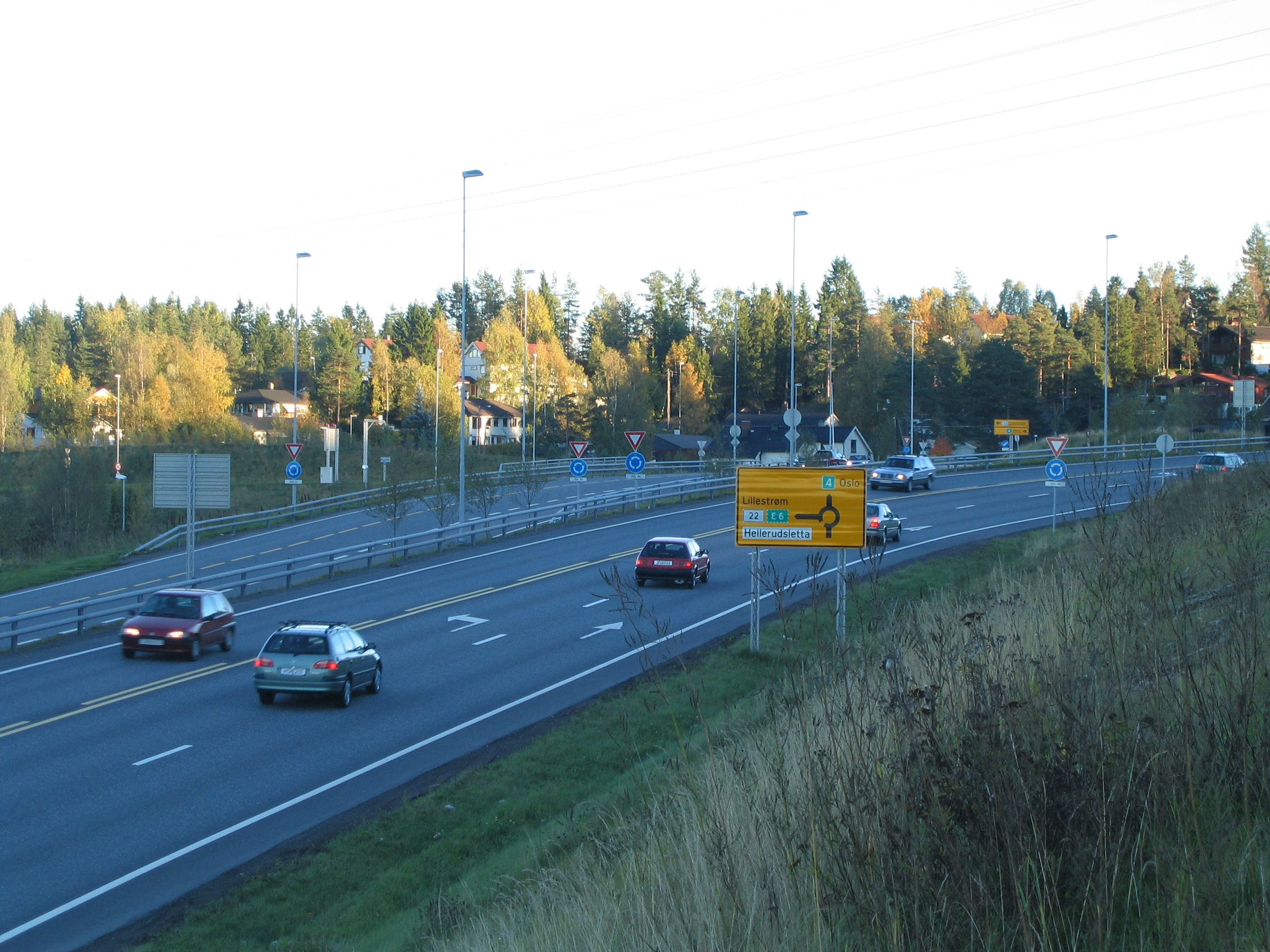
Norwegian National Road 4 at Gjelleråsen.

Gjelleråsen is an area which constitutes part of Oslomarka outside Oslo, Norway.

The area is bordered by Skedsmo to the east and Nittedal to the north. There are many historic roads running through the area, and two modern highways, Norwegian National Road 4 to the north, and European route E6 to the south.

The village of Gjelleråsen is known as a stopping point on Trondheimsveien, where Norwegian National Road 4 (Rv4) and join Norwegian National Road 22 (Rv22). Hagantunnelen on Norwegian National Road 4 starts at Gjelleråsen and at comes out at Slattum, where Norwegian National Road 4 runs north to Nittedal.

The headquarters of Ringnes lies in Gjelleråsen. There is also the headquarters of Diplom-Is and the head office of Würth Norge. In the south of the area, towards Skedsmo, is the former Lahaugmoen military base. This was used as a historical stopping point for invasions, including that led by King Karl XII in 1716.

The name of Gjelleråsen may come from Gjølluraas, or Gjoleid, which means "windy area", or from Gjøl - Gjel, which describes an inlet close to the road in the area. It may also come from the verb Gjalla, a sound as from an echo.
