= La Marche, Nièvre =

Commune in Nièvre, Bourgogne-Franche-Comté, France

La Marche
- Commune
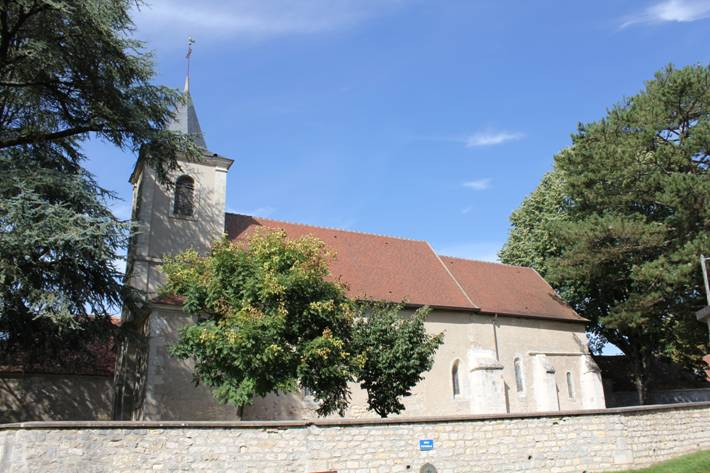
- The church of Saint-Martin, in La Marche

- Coat of arms
- Location of La Marche
- Location within France Location within Bourgogne-Franche-Comté
- Coordinates: 47°08′29″N 3°02′05″E
- Country: France
- Region: Bourgogne-Franche-Comté
- Department: Nièvre
- Arrondissement: Cosne-Cours-sur-Loire
- Canton: La Charité-sur-Loire
- Intercommunality: Les Bertranges

Government
  - Mayor (2020–2026): Christian Marillier
- Area^{1}: 10.87 km^{2} (4.20 sq mi)
- Highest elevation: 218 m (715 ft)
- Lowest elevation: 155 m (509 ft)
- Population (2023): 509
  - Density: 46.8/km^{2} (121/sq mi)
- Time zone: UTC+01:00 (CET)
  - Summer (DST): UTC+02:00 (CEST)
- INSEE/Postal code: 58155 /58400
- ^{1} French Land Register data, which excludes lakes, ponds, glaciers > 1 km^{2} (0.386 sq mi or 247 acres) and river estuaries.

La Marche (French pronunciation: [la maʁʃ]) is a commune in the Nièvre department in central France. La Marche station has rail connections to Nevers and Cosne-sur-Loire.

== See also ==
- Communes of the Nièvre department
