= Norsk Flyforsikringspool =

Norsk Flyforsikringspool was an insurance pool created by Norwegian insurance companies to handle pooling of aircraft insurance. It was established in 1919 and dissolved in 1996.
