= Vestmarka =

Recreational area in Oslomarka, Norway

Geography of Vestmarka
- Coordinates: 59°52′34″N 10°22′26″E
- Terrain: Forest

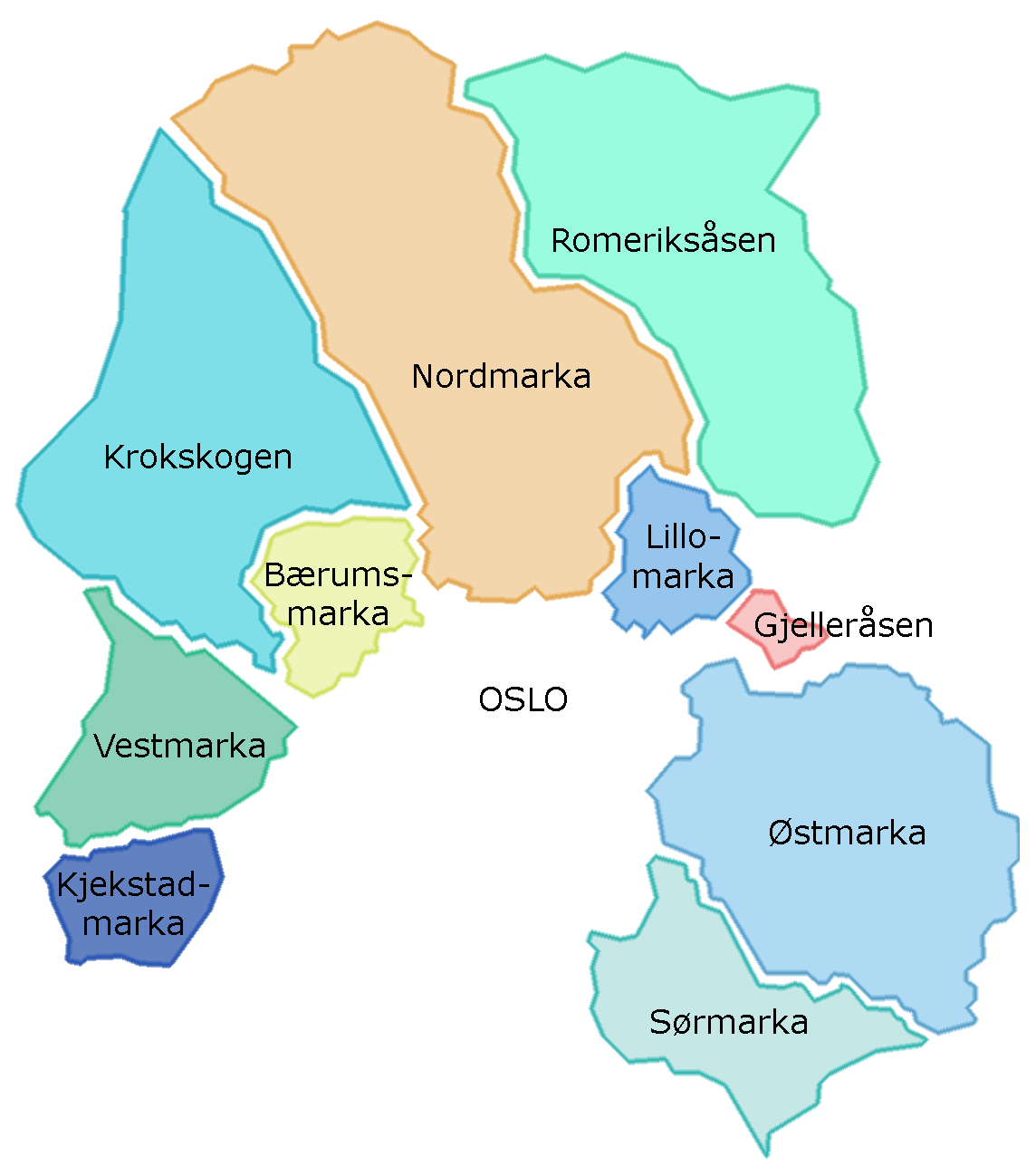
Vestmarka in relation to the rest of Oslomarka

Vestmarka is a forested and hilly area in Asker, Bærum and Lier which constitutes part of Oslomarka, Norway. The land is owned by Løvenskiold Vækerø and is a popular recreational area. It was the site of Braathens SAFE Flight 239, a plane crash on 23 December 1972.
