= Sørkedalen =

Valley in Oslo, Norway

Coordinates: 60.0158°N 10.6108°E

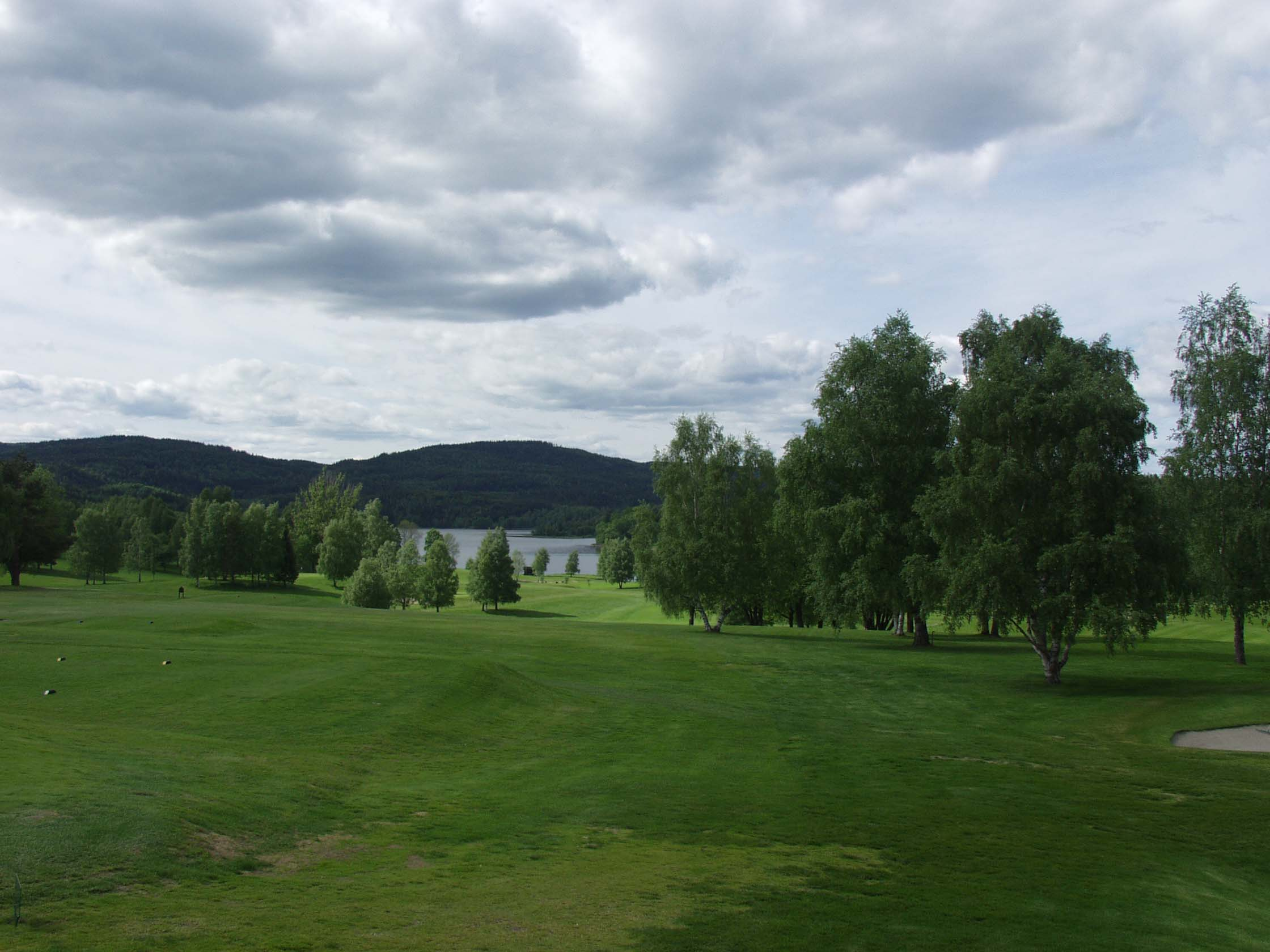
The view of Sørkedalen and Bogstadvannet from the Club House of Bogstad Golf Club

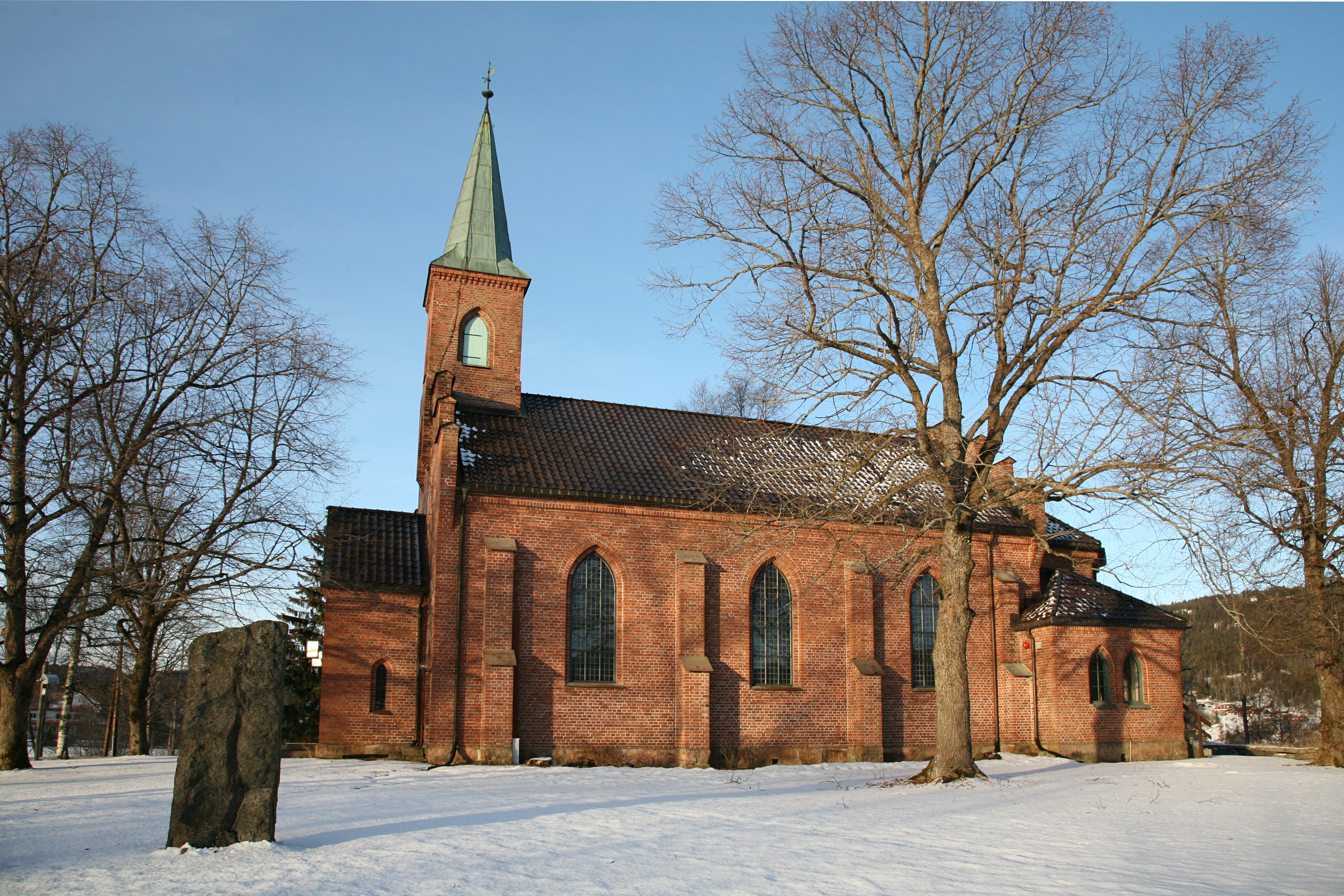
Sørkedalen Church

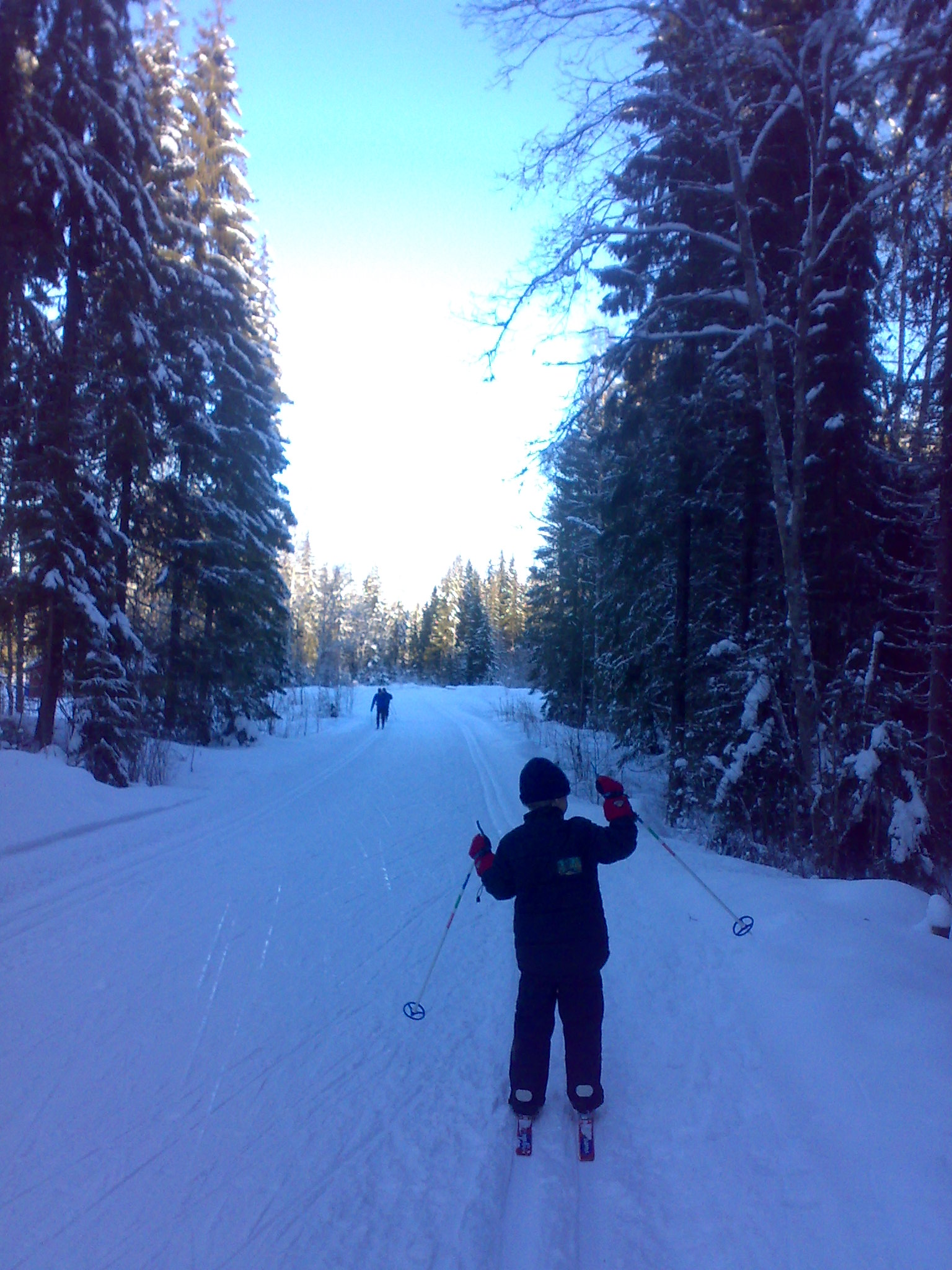
Sørkedalen during winter

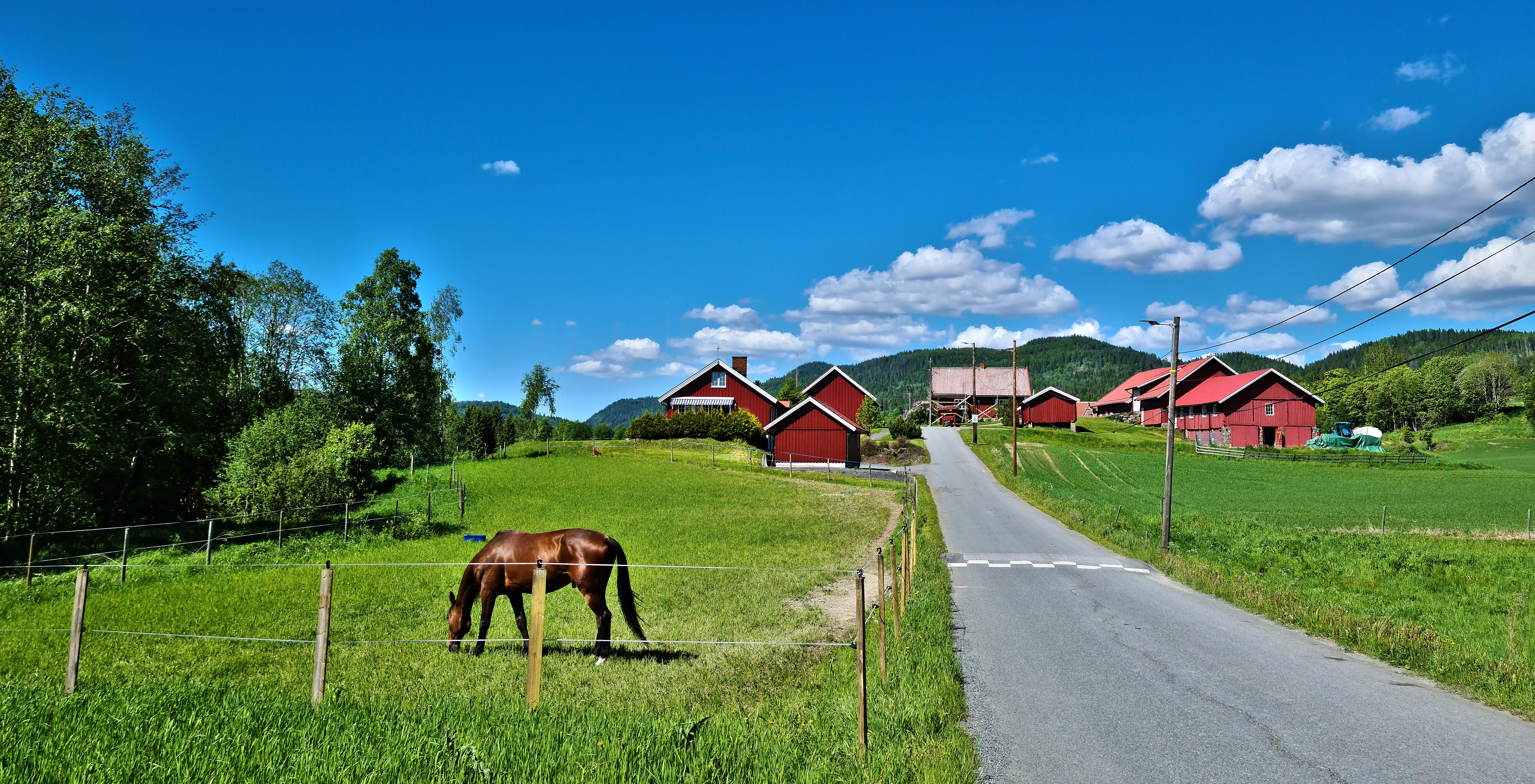
Pinsli farm in Sørkedalen

Sørkedalen is a valley located in the northwestern part of Oslo municipality, northwest of Oslo's western suburbs, in Norway.

The valley stretches from the suburb of Røa to Skansebakken. The valley is frequently used as an entry point to Nordmarka, the large wilderness recreational area to the north of Oslo.

Sørkedalen is an agricultural valley with several small farms, and stables for recreational horse riding. The valley is a popular destination for outdoor activities like skiing, riding and golfing for the population of West End Oslo and Bærum. Sørkedalen Church is a stone church from 1865 which was built of brick and has 250 seats. The church is in neo-Gothic style.

In the southern part of this valley is the old manor of Bogstad, which was owned by Peder Anker. On the manor grounds there are the lake Bogstadvannet and the Oslo Golf Club (Oslo Golfklubb) which was the first golf club to be established in Norway. The Sørkedalselva river runs through the valley and into the Bogstadvannet.

== The name ==
The Norse form of the name was Surkudalr. The first element is the genitive of the rivername Surka (now Sørkedalselva), the last element is dalr m 'dale, valley'. The meaning of the river's name is unknown (maybe 'the dark one').
