= Nordmarka =

Forest in the north of Oslos, Norway

Coordinates: 60°08′36″N 10°37′11″E

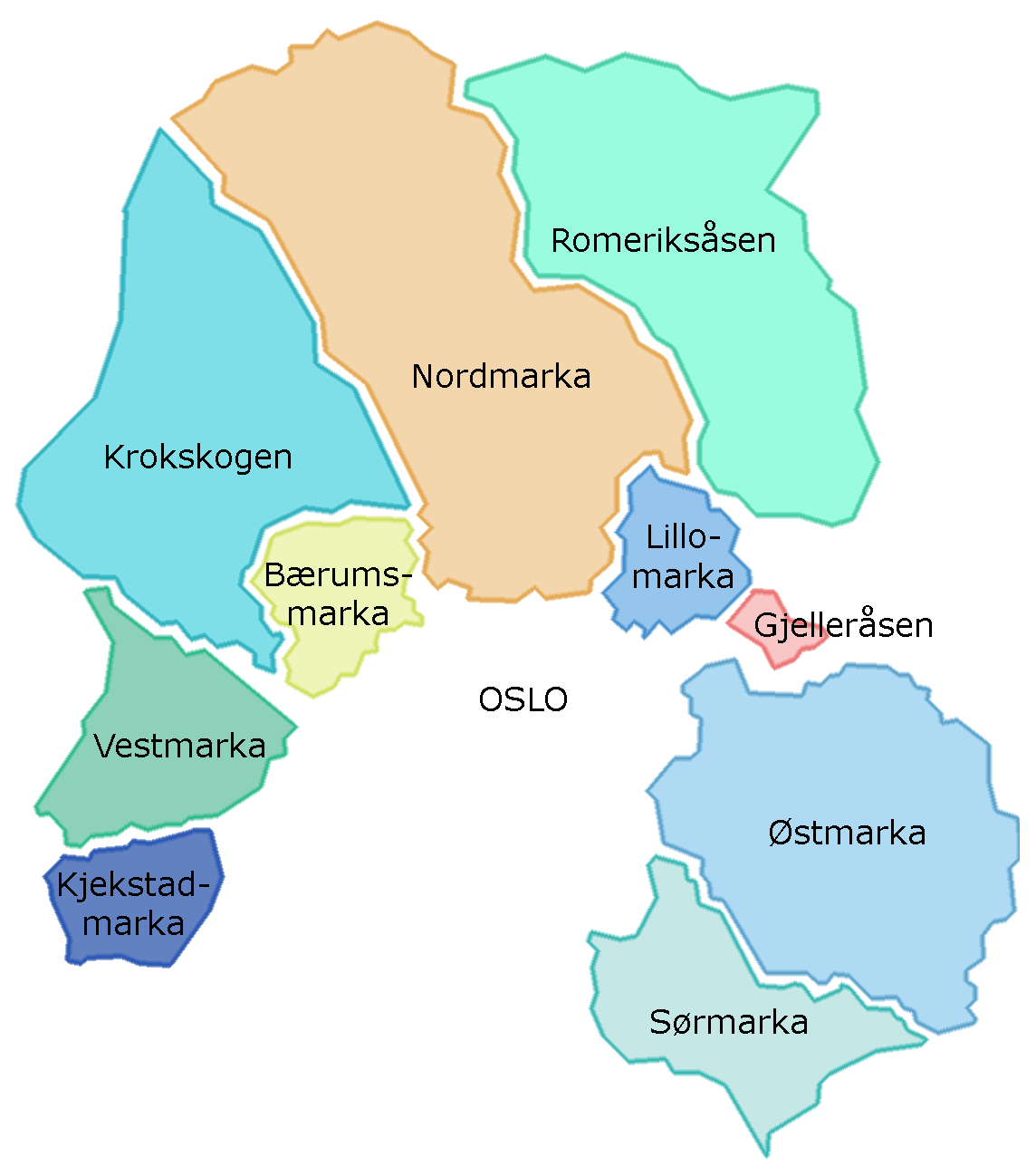
Nordmarka is the largest and most central part of Oslomarka

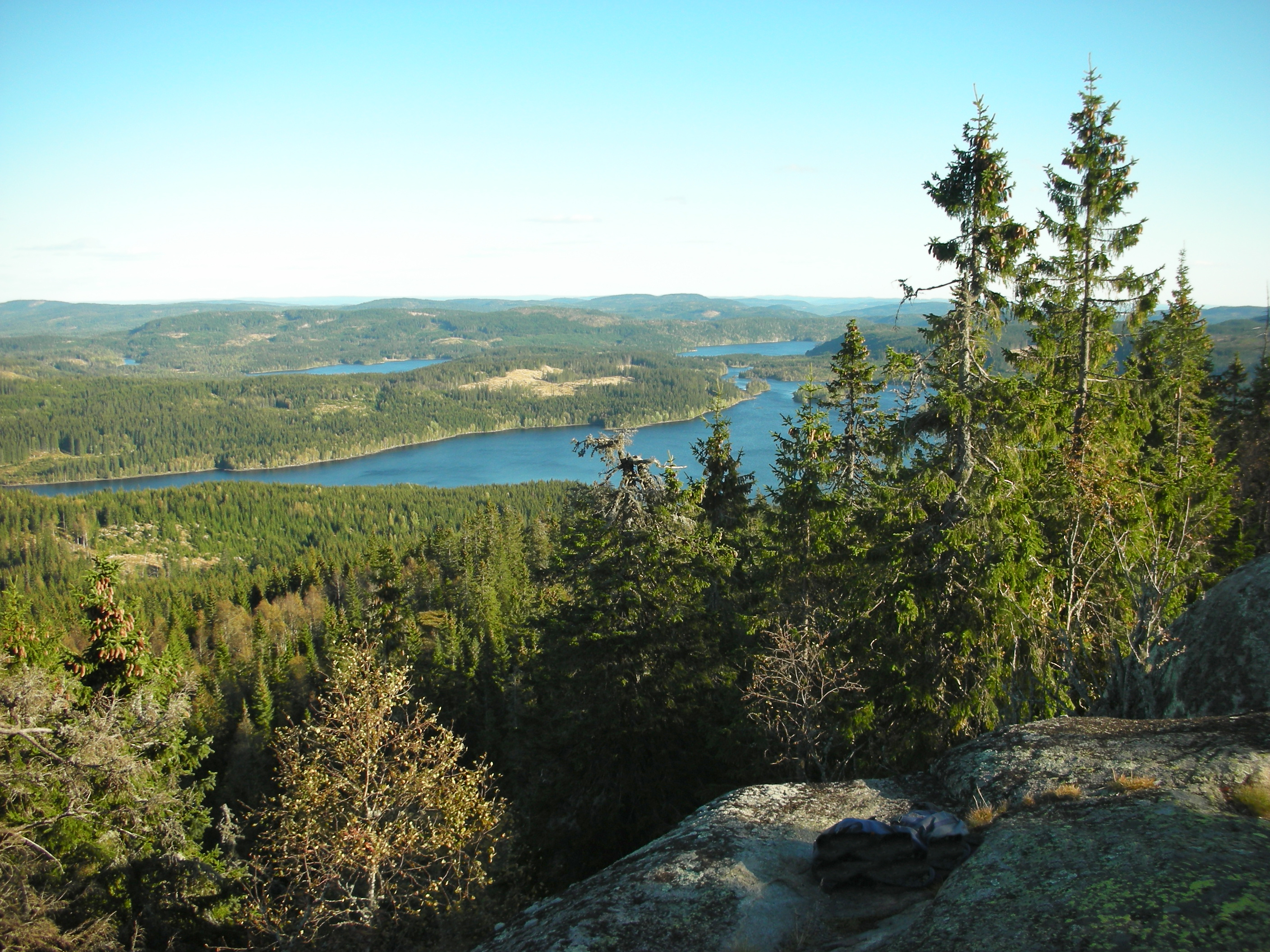
Sandungen

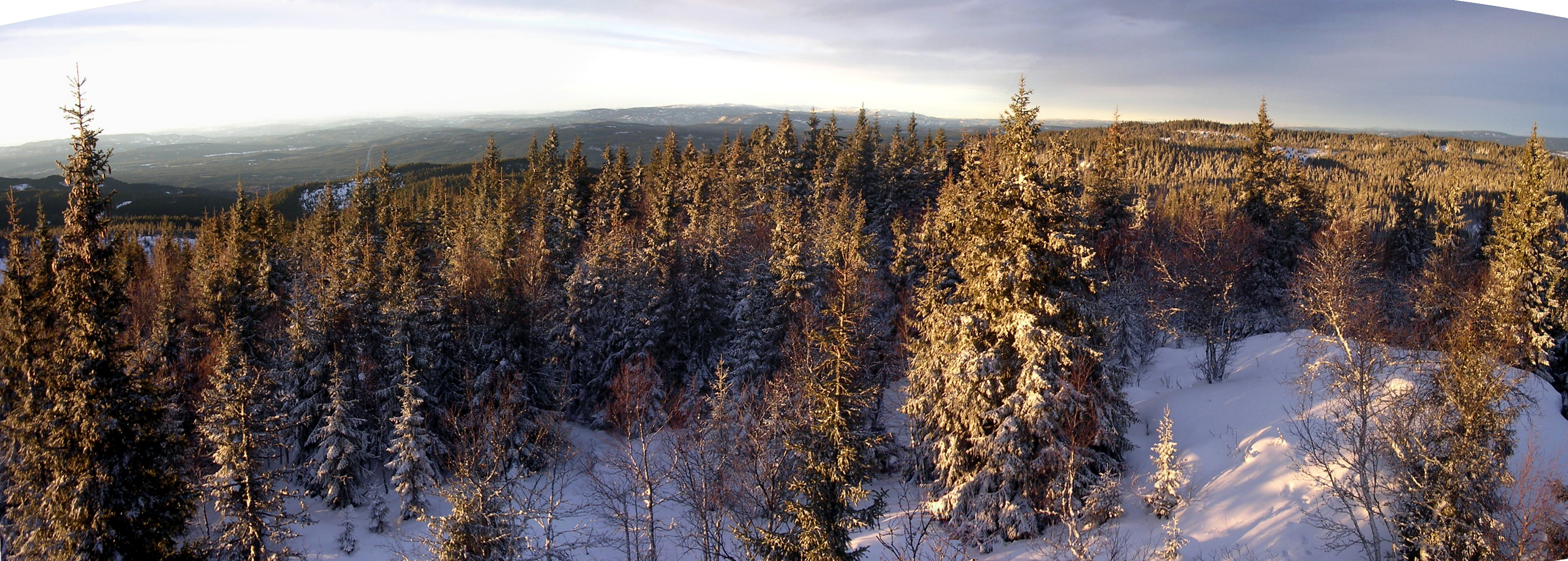
Svarttjernshøgda

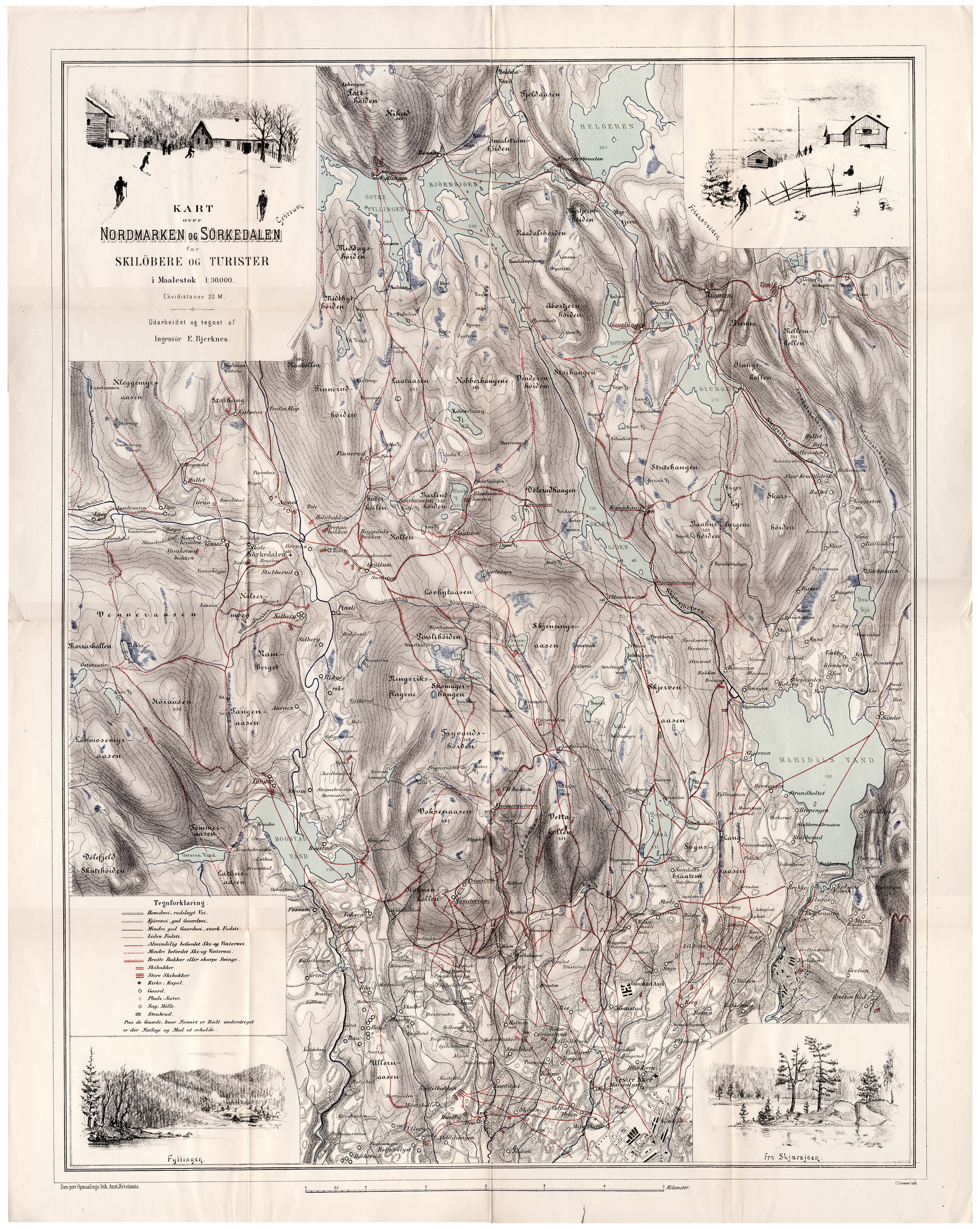
Historical Map of Nordmarka, showing ski trails, published in 1890

Nordmarka is the mostly forested region which makes up the northern part of Oslo, Norway. Nordmarka is the largest and most central part of Oslomarka. The area called Nordmarka also extends into the municipalities of Hole, Ringerike, Lunner, Jevnaker and Nittedal. It is the largest part of the Marka borough.

The forests are popular sites for hiking, biking and skiing. Winter sport is mostly possible from December until March, in cold winters also until April or the beginning of May in some areas. Most of the forests are protected, and it is not possible to obtain building permits for cabins in the area. There are, however, many cabins already in Nordmarka with cafes and overnighting accommodation.

There are several lakes in Nordmarka, which are used as a supply for drinking water, largest of these is the Maridalsvannet. Svarttjernshøgda in Jevnaker is the highest point in Nordmarka, at a height of 717 m.

== Name ==
The first element is nord 'north', the last element is the finite form of mark f 'woodland, forest'. The name is first mentioned on a map from 1760.
