= Canton of Saint-Just-en-Chevalet =

Coordinates: 45.9107°N 3.8468°E

Saint-Just-en-Chevalet
- Former canton
- Interactive map of Saint-Just-en-Chevalet
- Country: France
- Region: Auvergne-Rhône-Alpes
- Department: Loire
- No. of communes: {{{nbcomm}}}
- Disbanded: 2015
- Area: 230.85 km^{2} (89.13 sq mi)
- Population (2012): 4,655
  - Density: 20.16/km^{2} (52.23/sq mi)

The canton of Saint-Just-en-Chevalet is a French former administrative division located in the department of Loire and the Rhône-Alpes region. It was disbanded following the French canton reorganisation which came into effect in March 2015. It consisted of 10 communes, which joined the canton of Renaison in 2015. It had 4,655 inhabitants (2012).

The canton comprised the following communes:

- Champoly
- Chausseterre
- Cherier
- Cremeaux
- Juré
- Saint-Just-en-Chevalet
- Saint-Marcel-d'Urfé
- Saint-Priest-la-Prugne
- Saint-Romain-d'Urfé
- La Tuilière

== See also ==
- Cantons of the Loire department
