= Canton of La Pacaudière =

Coordinates: 46.1810°N 3.8748°E

La Pacaudière
- Former canton
- Interactive map of La Pacaudière
- Country: France
- Region: Auvergne-Rhône-Alpes
- Department: Loire
- No. of communes: {{{nbcomm}}}
- Disbanded: 2015
- Area: 187.60 km^{2} (72.43 sq mi)
- Population (2012): 4,351
  - Density: 23.19/km^{2} (60.07/sq mi)

The canton of La Pacaudière is a French former administrative division located in the department of Loire and the Rhone-Alpes region. It was disbanded following the French canton reorganisation which came into effect in March 2015. It consisted of 9 communes, which joined the canton of Renaison in 2015. It had 4,351 inhabitants (2012).

The canton comprised the following communes:

- Changy
- Le Crozet
- La Pacaudière
- Sail-les-Bains
- Saint-Bonnet-des-Quarts
- Saint-Forgeux-Lespinasse
- Saint-Martin-d'Estréaux
- Urbise
- Vivans

== See also ==
- Cantons of the Loire department
