= Canton of Saint-Haon-le-Châtel =

Coordinates: 46.0658°N 3.9218°E

Saint-Haon-le-Châtel
- Former canton
- Interactive map of Saint-Haon-le-Châtel
- Country: France
- Region: Auvergne-Rhône-Alpes
- Department: Loire
- No. of communes: {{{nbcomm}}}
- Disbanded: 2015
- Area: 217.51 km^{2} (83.98 sq mi)
- Population (2012): 13,032
  - Density: 59.914/km^{2} (155.18/sq mi)

The canton of Saint-Haon-le-Châtel is a French former administrative division located in the department of Loire and the Rhône-Alpes region. It was disbanded following the French canton reorganisation which came into effect in March 2015. It consisted of 12 communes, which joined the new canton of Renaison in 2015. It had 13,032 inhabitants (2012).

The canton comprised the following communes:

- Ambierle
- Arcon
- Noailly
- Les Noës
- Renaison
- Saint-Alban-les-Eaux
- Saint-André-d'Apchon
- Saint-Germain-Lespinasse
- Saint-Haon-le-Châtel
- Saint-Haon-le-Vieux
- Saint-Rirand
- Saint-Romain-la-Motte

== See also ==
- Cantons of the Loire department
