= Canton of Roanne-Sud =

Coordinates: 46.0104°N 4.0019°E

Roanne-Sud
- Former canton
- Interactive map of Roanne-Sud
- Country: France
- Region: Auvergne-Rhône-Alpes
- Department: Loire
- No. of communes: {{{nbcomm}}}
- Disbanded: 2015
- Population (2012): 36,417

The canton of Roanne-Sud is a French former administrative division located in the department of Loire and the Rhone-Alpes region. It was disbanded following the French canton reorganisation which came into effect in March 2015. It had 36,417 inhabitants (2012).

The canton comprised the following communes:

- Lentigny
- Ouches
- Pouilly-les-Nonains
- Riorges
- Roanne (partly)
- Saint-Jean-Saint-Maurice-sur-Loire
- Saint-Léger-sur-Roanne
- Villemontais
- Villerest

== See also ==
- Cantons of the Loire department
