= Roannais Agglomération =

Coordinates: 46°04′N 04°02′E

- Communauté d'agglomération
- Country: France
- Region: Auvergne-Rhône-Alpes
- Department: Loire
- No. of communes: {{{nbcomm}}}
- Established: 2013
- Area: 689.3 km^{2} (266.1 sq mi)
- Population (2017): 100,486
  - Density: 145.8/km^{2} (377.6/sq mi)
- Website: www.aggloroanne.fr

Roannais Agglomération is the communauté d'agglomération, an intercommunal structure, centred on the city of Roanne. It is located in the Loire department, in the Auvergne-Rhône-Alpes region, east-central France. It was created in January 2013 by the merger of the former Communauté d'agglomération Grand Roanne Agglomération with 4 former communautés de communes and 1 other commune. Its seat is in Roanne. Its area is 689.3 km^{2}. Its population was 100,486 in 2017, of which 34,366 in Roanne proper.

== Composition ==
The communauté d'agglomération consists of the following 40 communes:

1. Ambierle
2. Arcon
3. Changy
4. Combre
5. Commelle-Vernay
6. Le Coteau
7. Coutouvre
8. Le Crozet
9. Lentigny
10. Les Noës
11. Mably
12. Montagny
13. Noailly
14. Notre-Dame-de-Boisset
15. Ouches
16. La Pacaudière
17. Parigny
18. Perreux
19. Pouilly-les-Nonains
20. Renaison
21. Riorges
22. Roanne
23. Sail-les-Bains
24. Saint-Alban-les-Eaux
25. Saint-André-d'Apchon
26. Saint-Bonnet-des-Quarts
27. Saint-Forgeux-Lespinasse
28. Saint-Germain-Lespinasse
29. Saint-Haon-le-Châtel
30. Saint-Haon-le-Vieux
31. Saint-Jean-Saint-Maurice-sur-Loire
32. Saint-Léger-sur-Roanne
33. Saint-Martin-d'Estréaux
34. Saint-Rirand
35. Saint-Romain-la-Motte
36. Saint-Vincent-de-Boisset
37. Urbise
38. Villemontais
39. Villerest
40. Vivans
