= Chausseterre =

- Commune
- Coat of arms
- Location of Chausseterre
- Location within France Location within Auvergne-Rhône-Alpes
- Coordinates: 45°53′49″N 3°47′04″E
- Country: France
- Region: Auvergne-Rhône-Alpes
- Department: Loire
- Arrondissement: Roanne
- Canton: Renaison
- Intercommunality: Pays d'Urfé

Government
  - Mayor (2020–2026): Lorraine Roux
- Area^{1}: 16.58 km^{2} (6.40 sq mi)
- Elevation: 688 m (2,257 ft)
- Highest elevation: 1,144 m (3,753 ft)
- Lowest elevation: 627 m (2,057 ft)
- Population (2023): 212
  - Density: 12.8/km^{2} (33.1/sq mi)
- Time zone: UTC+01:00 (CET)
  - Summer (DST): UTC+02:00 (CEST)
- INSEE/Postal code: 42339 /42430
- ^{1} French Land Register data, which excludes lakes, ponds, glaciers > 1 km^{2} (0.386 sq mi or 247 acres) and river estuaries.

Chausseterre (French pronunciation: [ʃostɛʁ]) is a commune in the Loire department in central France. It was created in 1947 from part of Saint-Romain-d'Urfé.

== Population ==
Historical population
Year	Pop.	±% p.a.
1968	366	—
1975	326	−1.64%
1982	314	−0.53%
1990	277	−1.55%
1999	277	+0.00%
2007	253	−1.13%
2012	244	−0.72%
2017	224	−1.70%
2023	212	−0.91%
Source: INSEE

== See also ==
- Communes of the Loire department
