= La Pacaudière =

- Commune
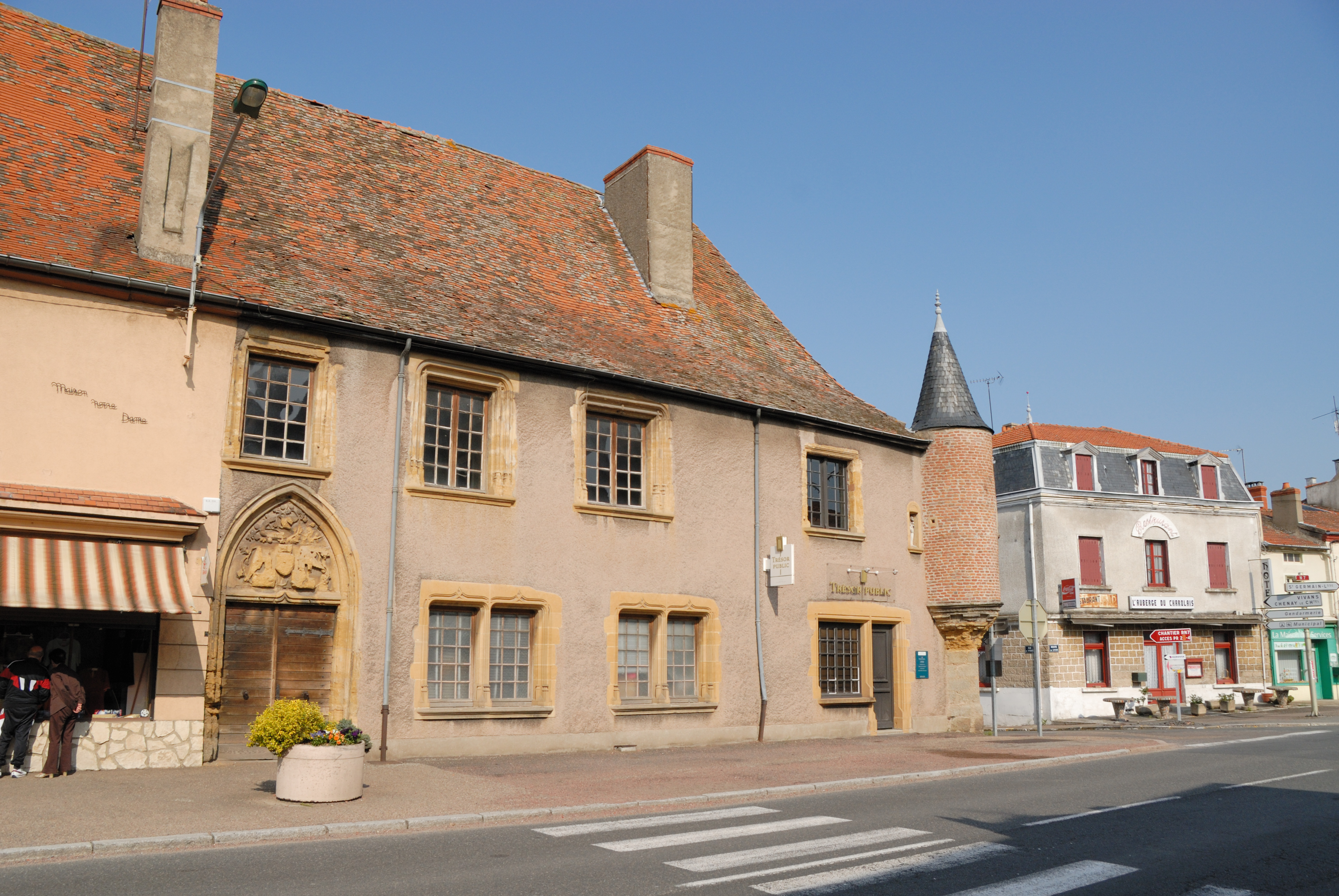
- Hôtel des Impôts

- Coat of arms
- Location of La Pacaudière
- Location within France Location within Auvergne-Rhône-Alpes
- Coordinates: 46°10′34″N 3°52′05″E
- Country: France
- Region: Auvergne-Rhône-Alpes
- Department: Loire
- Arrondissement: Roanne
- Canton: Renaison
- Intercommunality: Roannais Agglomération

Government
  - Mayor (2020–2026): Jacques Troncy
- Area^{1}: 20.61 km^{2} (7.96 sq mi)
- Elevation: 363 m (1,191 ft)
- Highest elevation: 443 m (1,453 ft)
- Lowest elevation: 295 m (968 ft)
- Population (2023): 1,088
  - Density: 52.79/km^{2} (136.7/sq mi)
- Time zone: UTC+01:00 (CET)
  - Summer (DST): UTC+02:00 (CEST)
- INSEE/Postal code: 42163 /42310
- ^{1} French Land Register data, which excludes lakes, ponds, glaciers > 1 km^{2} (0.386 sq mi or 247 acres) and river estuaries.

La Pacaudière (French pronunciation: [la pakodjɛʁ]) is a commune in the Loire department in central France.

== Population ==
Historical population
Year	Pop.	±% p.a.
1968	1,219	—
1975	1,279	+0.69%
1982	1,222	−0.65%
1990	1,182	−0.42%
1999	1,168	−0.13%
2007	1,100	−0.75%
2012	1,055	−0.83%
2017	1,057	+0.04%
2023	1,088	+0.48%
Source: INSEE

== See also ==
- Communes of the Loire department
