= Urbise =

- Commune
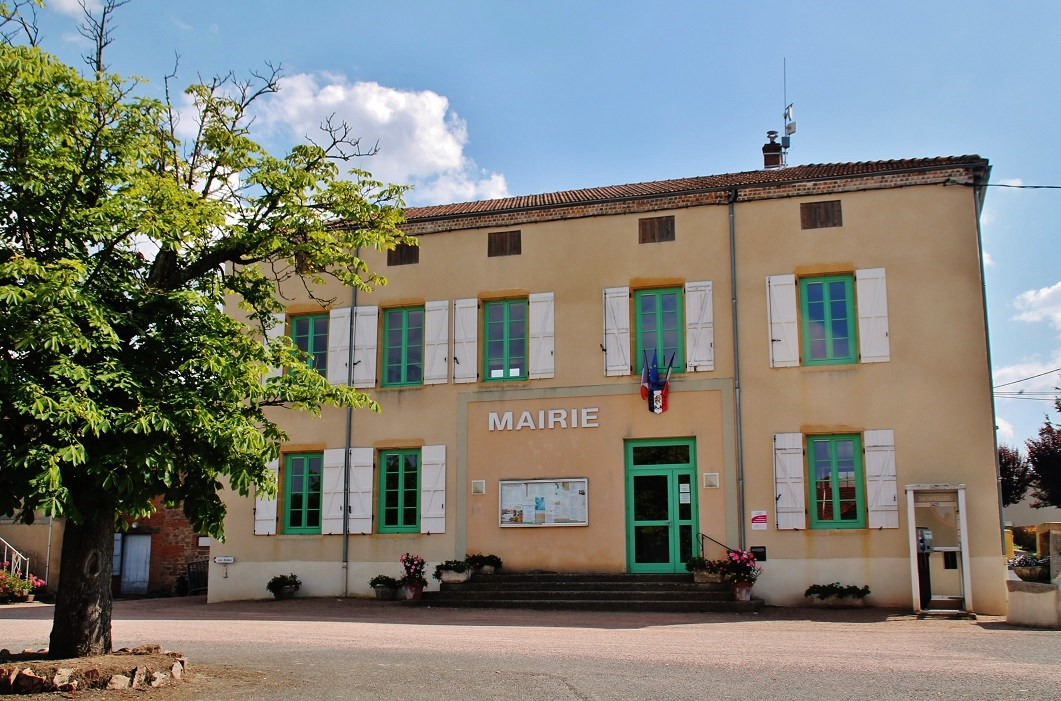
- Town hall
- Location of Urbise
- Location within France Location within Auvergne-Rhône-Alpes
- Coordinates: 46°15′18″N 3°53′34″E
- Country: France
- Region: Auvergne-Rhône-Alpes
- Department: Loire
- Arrondissement: Roanne
- Canton: Renaison
- Intercommunality: Roannais Agglomération

Government
  - Mayor (2020–2026): Aimé Combaret
- Area^{1}: 15.5 km^{2} (6.0 sq mi)
- Elevation: 200 m (660 ft)
- Highest elevation: 330 m (1,080 ft)
- Lowest elevation: 269 m (883 ft)
- Population (2023): 117
  - Density: 7.55/km^{2} (19.6/sq mi)
- Time zone: UTC+01:00 (CET)
  - Summer (DST): UTC+02:00 (CEST)
- INSEE/Postal code: 42317 /42310
- ^{1} French Land Register data, which excludes lakes, ponds, glaciers > 1 km^{2} (0.386 sq mi or 247 acres) and river estuaries.

Urbise (French pronunciation: [yʁbiz]) is a commune in the Loire department in central France.

It is located 39 kilometres (24 mi) northeast of Vichy and 28 kilometres (17 mi) northwest of Roanne, on departmental routes D8, D52 and D490, close to the border with Saône-et-Loire.

== Population ==
Historical population
| Year | Pop. | ±% p.a. |
|---|---|---|
| 1968 | 247 | — |
| 1975 | 191 | −3.61% |
| 1982 | 171 | −1.57% |
| 1990 | 152 | −1.46% |
| 1999 | 140 | −0.91% |
| 2007 | 129 | −1.02% |
| 2012 | 134 | +0.76% |
| 2017 | 130 | −0.60% |
| 2023 | 117 | −1.74% |
Source: INSEE

== See also ==
- Communes of the Loire department
