= Sail-les-Bains =

- Commune
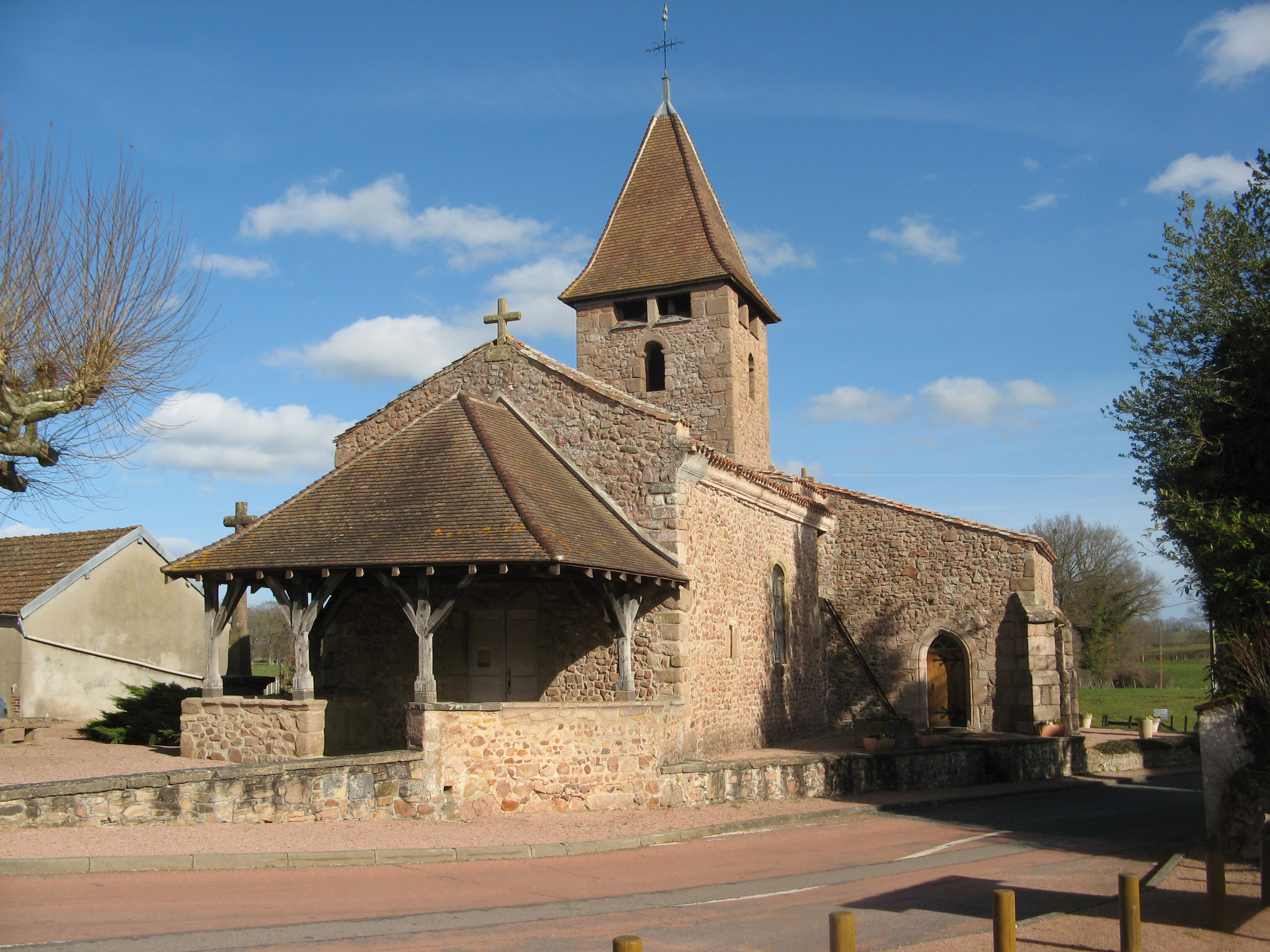
- Location of Sail-les-Bains
- Location within France Location within Auvergne-Rhône-Alpes
- Coordinates: 46°14′21″N 3°50′47″E
- Country: France
- Region: Auvergne-Rhône-Alpes
- Department: Loire
- Arrondissement: Roanne
- Canton: Renaison
- Intercommunality: Roannais Agglomération

Government
  - Mayor (2020–2026): Michel Pourret
- Area^{1}: 21.11 km^{2} (8.15 sq mi)
- Elevation: 298 m (978 ft)
- Highest elevation: 421 m (1,381 ft)
- Lowest elevation: 279 m (915 ft)
- Population (2023): 209
  - Density: 9.90/km^{2} (25.6/sq mi)
- Time zone: UTC+01:00 (CET)
  - Summer (DST): UTC+02:00 (CEST)
- INSEE/Postal code: 42194 /42310
- ^{1} French Land Register data, which excludes lakes, ponds, glaciers > 1 km^{2} (0.386 sq mi or 247 acres) and river estuaries.

Sail-les-Bains (French pronunciation: [saj le bɛ̃]) is a commune in the Loire department in central France.

== Population ==
Historical population
Year	Pop.	±% p.a.
1968	346	—
1975	307	−1.69%
1982	316	+0.41%
1990	264	−2.22%
1999	222	−1.91%
2007	221	−0.06%
2012	201	−1.88%
2017	200	−0.10%
2023	209	+0.74%
Source: INSEE

== See also ==
- Communes of the Loire department
