= Cremeaux =

Crémeaux
- Commune
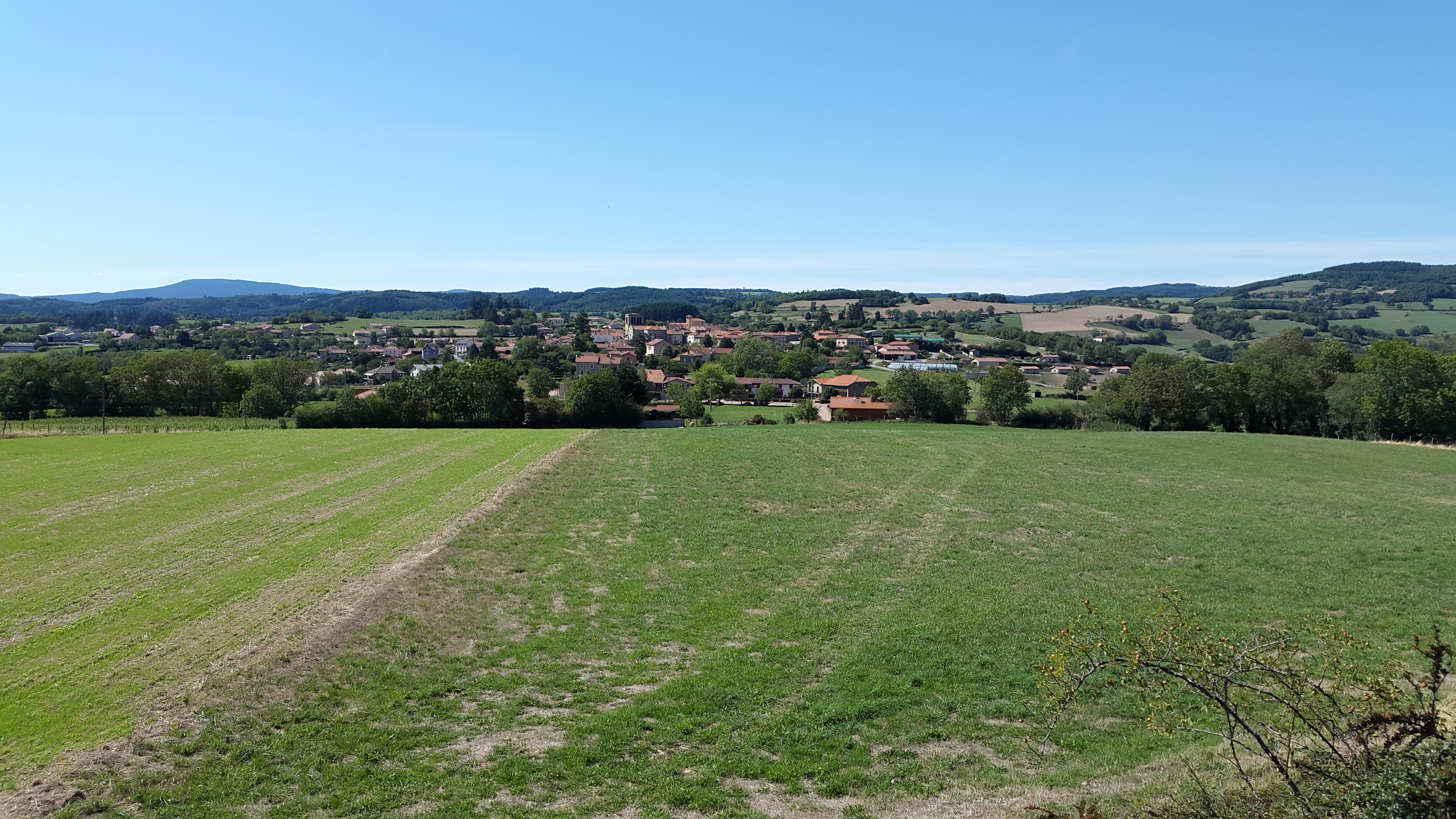

- Coat of arms
- Location of Crémeaux
- Location within France Location within Auvergne-Rhône-Alpes
- Coordinates: 45°54′31″N 3°55′45″E
- Country: France
- Region: Auvergne-Rhône-Alpes
- Department: Loire
- Arrondissement: Roanne
- Canton: Renaison
- Intercommunality: Pays d'Urfé

Government
  - Mayor (2020–2026): Didier Poncet
- Area^{1}: 33.32 km^{2} (12.86 sq mi)
- Elevation: 680 m (2,230 ft)
- Highest elevation: 912 m (2,992 ft)
- Lowest elevation: 456 m (1,496 ft)
- Population (2023): 914
  - Density: 27.4/km^{2} (71.0/sq mi)
- Time zone: UTC+01:00 (CET)
  - Summer (DST): UTC+02:00 (CEST)
- INSEE/Postal code: 42076 /42260
- ^{1} French Land Register data, which excludes lakes, ponds, glaciers > 1 km^{2} (0.386 sq mi or 247 acres) and river estuaries.

Cremeaux (French pronunciation: [kʁəmo]) is a commune in the Loire department in central France.

== Population ==
Historical population
Year	Pop.	±% p.a.
1968	1,088	—
1975	987	−1.38%
1982	970	−0.25%
1990	937	−0.43%
1999	904	−0.40%
2007	939	+0.48%
2012	919	−0.43%
2017	904	−0.33%
2023	914	+0.18%
Source: INSEE

== See also ==
- Communes of the Loire department
