= Saint-Germain-Lespinasse =

- Commune
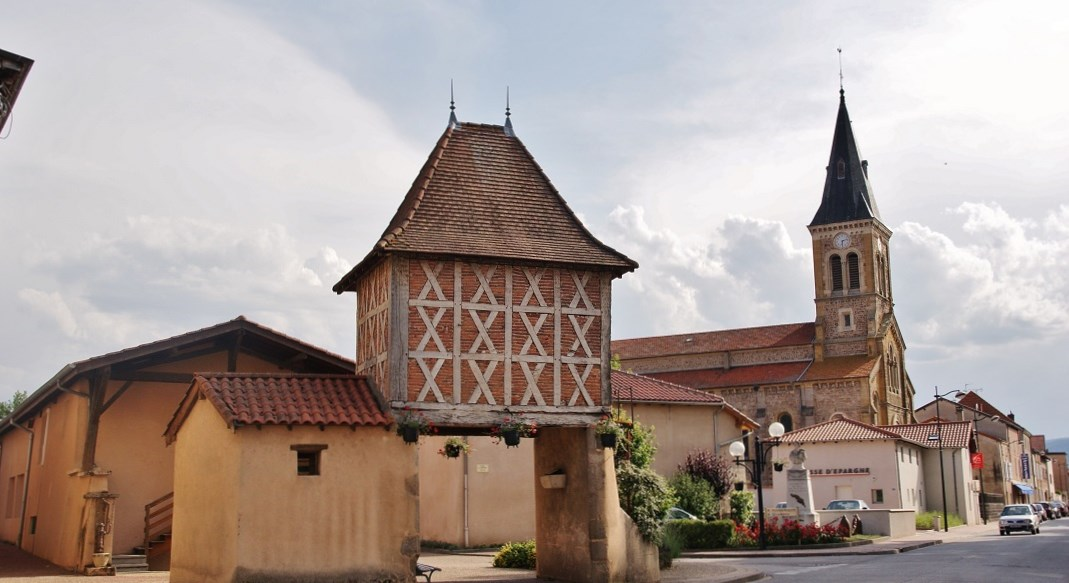

- Coat of arms
- Location of Saint-Germain-Lespinasse
- Location within France Location within Auvergne-Rhône-Alpes
- Coordinates: 46°06′14″N 3°57′48″E
- Country: France
- Region: Auvergne-Rhône-Alpes
- Department: Loire
- Arrondissement: Roanne
- Canton: Renaison
- Intercommunality: Roannais Agglomération

Government
  - Mayor (2020–2026): Pierre Coissard
- Area^{1}: 15 km^{2} (5.8 sq mi)
- Elevation: 335 m (1,099 ft)
- Highest elevation: 349 m (1,145 ft)
- Lowest elevation: 281 m (922 ft)
- Population (2023): 1,225
  - Density: 82/km^{2} (210/sq mi)
- Time zone: UTC+01:00 (CET)
  - Summer (DST): UTC+02:00 (CEST)
- INSEE/Postal code: 42231 /42640
- ^{1} French Land Register data, which excludes lakes, ponds, glaciers > 1 km^{2} (0.386 sq mi or 247 acres) and river estuaries.

Saint-Germain-Lespinasse (French pronunciation: [sɛ̃ ʒɛʁmɛ̃ lɛspinas]) is a commune in the Loire department in central France.

== Population ==
Historical population
Year	Pop.	±% p.a.
1968	1,135	—
1975	1,160	+0.31%
1982	1,186	+0.32%
1990	1,063	−1.36%
1999	1,101	+0.39%
2007	1,152	+0.57%
2012	1,161	+0.16%
2017	1,251	+1.50%
2023	1,225	−0.35%
Source: INSEE

== See also ==
- Communes of the Loire department
