= Saint-Bonnet-des-Quarts =

- Commune
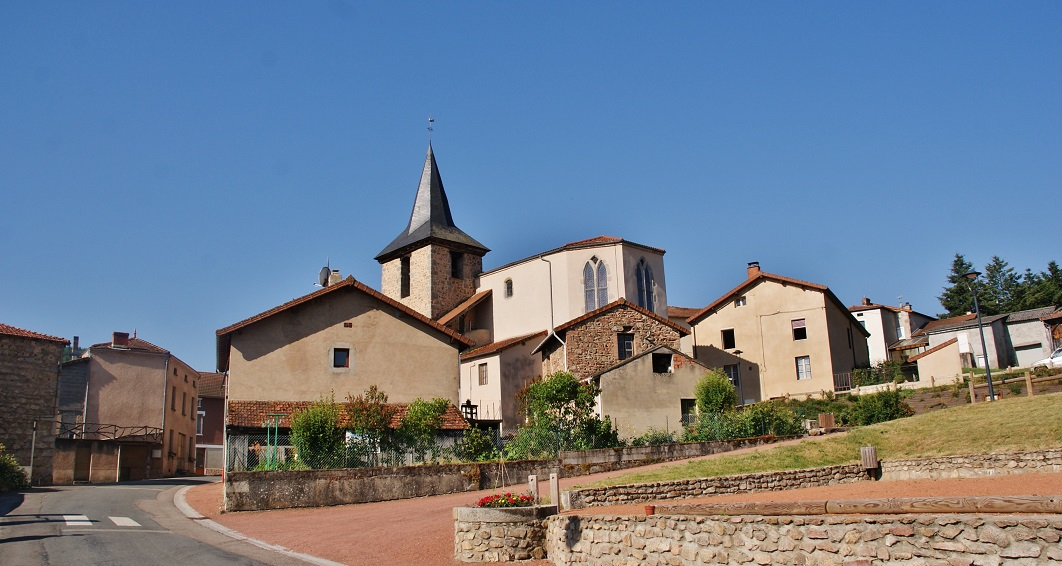

- Coat of arms
- Location of Saint-Bonnet-des-Quarts
- Location within France Location within Auvergne-Rhône-Alpes
- Coordinates: 46°07′57″N 3°50′38″E
- Country: France
- Region: Auvergne-Rhône-Alpes
- Department: Loire
- Arrondissement: Roanne
- Canton: Renaison
- Intercommunality: Roannais Agglomération

Government
  - Mayor (2020–2026): Christian Dupuis
- Area^{1}: 32.45 km^{2} (12.53 sq mi)
- Elevation: 412 m (1,352 ft)
- Highest elevation: 966 m (3,169 ft)
- Lowest elevation: 395 m (1,296 ft)
- Population (2023): 340
  - Density: 10/km^{2} (27/sq mi)
- Time zone: UTC+01:00 (CET)
  - Summer (DST): UTC+02:00 (CEST)
- INSEE/Postal code: 42203 /42310
- ^{1} French Land Register data, which excludes lakes, ponds, glaciers > 1 km^{2} (0.386 sq mi or 247 acres) and river estuaries.

Saint-Bonnet-des-Quarts (French pronunciation: [sɛ̃ bɔnɛ de kaʁ]) is a commune in the Loire department in central France.

== Population ==
Historical population
Year	Pop.	±% p.a.
1968	423	—
1975	369	−1.93%
1982	332	−1.50%
1990	366	+1.23%
1999	364	−0.06%
2007	333	−1.11%
2012	370	+2.13%
2017	318	−2.98%
2023	340	+1.12%
Source: INSEE

== See also ==
- Communes of the Loire department
