= Saint-Rirand =

- Commune
- Coat of arms
- Location of Saint-Rirand
- Location within France Location within Auvergne-Rhône-Alpes
- Coordinates: 46°04′37″N 3°50′58″E
- Country: France
- Region: Auvergne-Rhône-Alpes
- Department: Loire
- Arrondissement: Roanne
- Canton: Renaison
- Intercommunality: Roannais Agglomération

Government
  - Mayor (2020–2026): Didier Prunet
- Area^{1}: 16.43 km^{2} (6.34 sq mi)
- Elevation: 590 m (1,940 ft)
- Highest elevation: 1,035 m (3,396 ft)
- Lowest elevation: 486 m (1,594 ft)
- Population (2023): 132
  - Density: 8.03/km^{2} (20.8/sq mi)
- Time zone: UTC+01:00 (CET)
  - Summer (DST): UTC+02:00 (CEST)
- INSEE/Postal code: 42281 /42370
- ^{1} French Land Register data, which excludes lakes, ponds, glaciers > 1 km^{2} (0.386 sq mi or 247 acres) and river estuaries.

Saint-Rirand (French pronunciation: [sɛ̃ ʁiʁɑ̃]) is a commune in the Loire department in central France.

== Population ==
Historical population
Year	Pop.	±% p.a.
1968	180	—
1975	140	−3.53%
1982	134	−0.62%
1990	124	−0.96%
1999	110	−1.32%
2007	146	+3.60%
2012	151	+0.68%
2017	140	−1.50%
2023	132	−0.98%
Source: INSEE

== See also ==
- Communes of the Loire department
