= Pouilly-les-Nonains =

- Commune
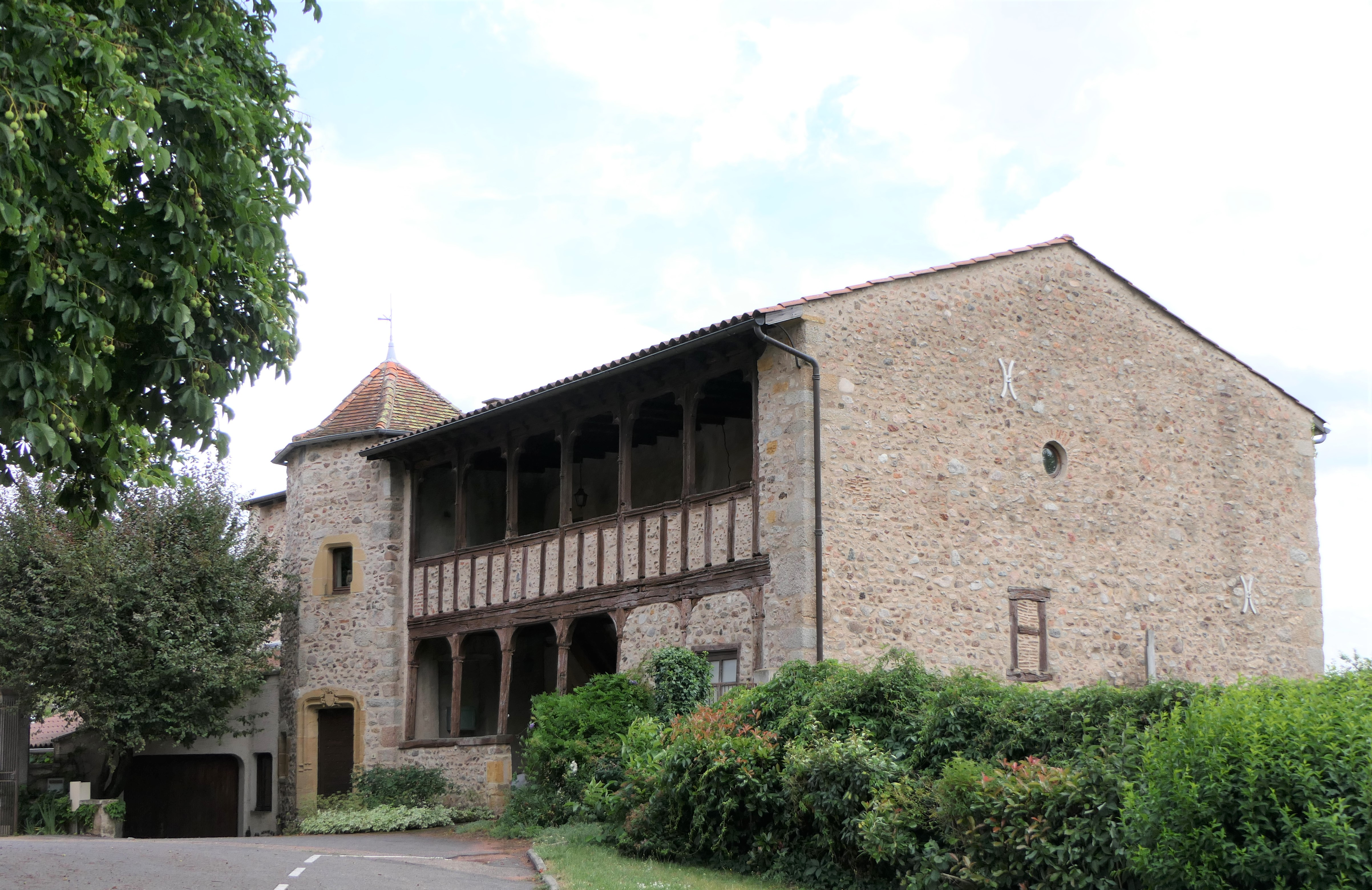
- Priory

- Coat of arms
- Location of Pouilly-les-Nonains
- Location within France Location within Auvergne-Rhône-Alpes
- Coordinates: 46°02′21″N 3°58′57″E
- Country: France
- Region: Auvergne-Rhône-Alpes
- Department: Loire
- Arrondissement: Roanne
- Canton: Renaison
- Intercommunality: Roannais Agglomération

Government
  - Mayor (2020–2026): Éric Martin
- Area^{1}: 10.23 km^{2} (3.95 sq mi)
- Elevation: 327 m (1,073 ft)
- Highest elevation: 354 m (1,161 ft)
- Lowest elevation: 308 m (1,010 ft)
- Population (2023): 2,120
  - Density: 207/km^{2} (537/sq mi)
- Time zone: UTC+01:00 (CET)
  - Summer (DST): UTC+02:00 (CEST)
- INSEE/Postal code: 42176 /42155
- ^{1} French Land Register data, which excludes lakes, ponds, glaciers > 1 km^{2} (0.386 sq mi or 247 acres) and river estuaries.

Pouilly-les-Nonains (French pronunciation: [puji lɛ nɔnɛ̃]) is a commune in the Loire department in central France.

== Population ==
Historical population

Year	Pop.	±% p.a.
1793	270	—
1821	291	+0.27%
1846	658	+3.32%
1872	763	+0.57%
1901	931	+0.69%
1926	536	−2.18%
1946	606	+0.62%
1962	694	+0.85%
1968	774	+1.83%

Year	Pop.	±% p.a.
1975	1,021	+4.04%
1982	1,311	+3.64%
1990	1,627	+2.74%
1999	1,598	−0.20%
2007	1,743	+1.09%
2012	1,893	+1.66%
2017	2,123	+2.32%
2023	2,120	−0.02%

Source: EHESS and INSEE (1968-2023)

== See also ==
- Communes of the Loire department
