= Saint-Forgeux-Lespinasse =

- Commune
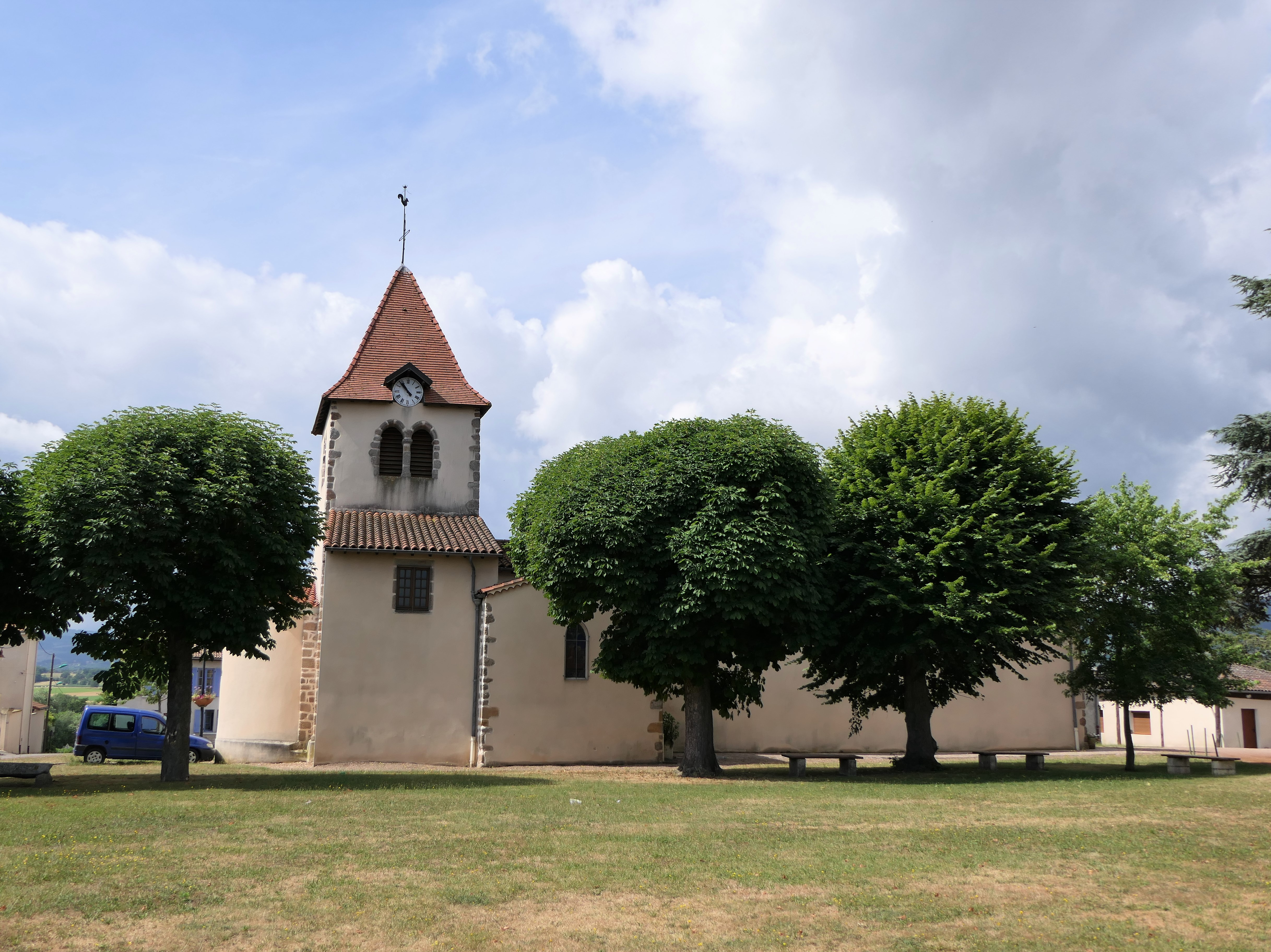

- Coat of arms
- Location of Saint-Forgeux-Lespinasse
- Location within France Location within Auvergne-Rhône-Alpes
- Coordinates: 46°07′27″N 3°55′55″E
- Country: France
- Region: Auvergne-Rhône-Alpes
- Department: Loire
- Arrondissement: Roanne
- Canton: Renaison
- Intercommunality: Roannais Agglomération

Government
  - Mayor (2020–2026): Jean-Marc Ambroise
- Area^{1}: 16.19 km^{2} (6.25 sq mi)
- Elevation: 322 m (1,056 ft)
- Highest elevation: 363 m (1,191 ft)
- Lowest elevation: 287 m (942 ft)
- Population (2023): 590
  - Density: 36/km^{2} (94/sq mi)
- Time zone: UTC+01:00 (CET)
  - Summer (DST): UTC+02:00 (CEST)
- INSEE/Postal code: 42220 /42640
- ^{1} French Land Register data, which excludes lakes, ponds, glaciers > 1 km^{2} (0.386 sq mi or 247 acres) and river estuaries.

Saint-Forgeux-Lespinasse (French pronunciation: [sɛ̃ fɔʁʒø lɛspinas]) is a commune in the Loire department in central France. As of 2022, the population was 594

== Population ==
Historical population
Year	Pop.	±% p.a.
1968	437	—
1975	385	−1.79%
1982	404	+0.69%
1990	416	+0.37%
1999	416	+0.00%
2007	486	+1.96%
2012	563	+2.99%
2017	646	+2.79%
2023	590	−1.50%
Source: INSEE

== See also ==
- Communes of the Loire department
