= Villemontais =

- Commune
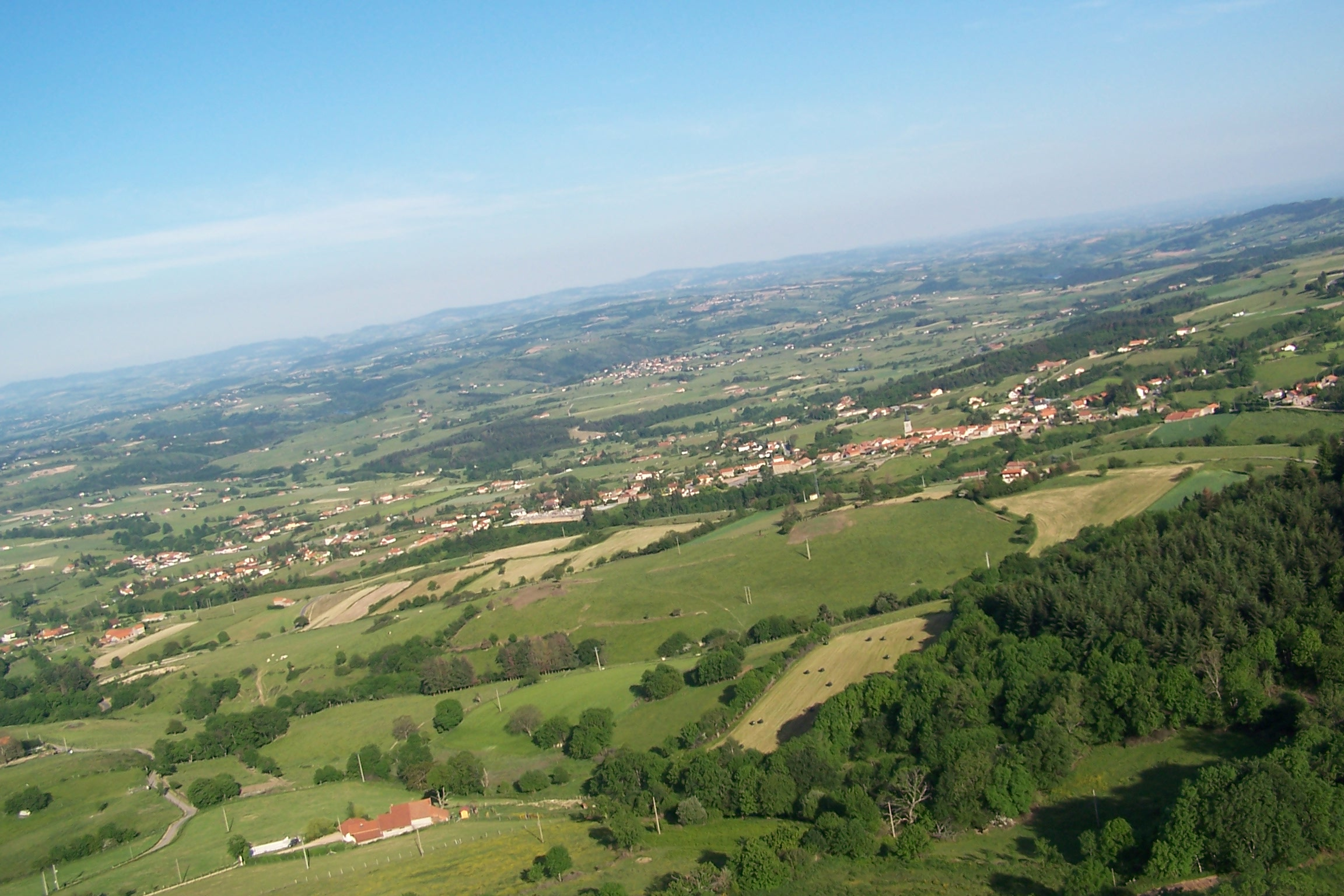

- Coat of arms
- Location of Villemontais
- Location within France Location within Auvergne-Rhône-Alpes
- Coordinates: 45°58′48″N 3°57′05″E
- Country: France
- Region: Auvergne-Rhône-Alpes
- Department: Loire
- Arrondissement: Roanne
- Canton: Renaison
- Intercommunality: Roannais Agglomération

Government
  - Mayor (2022–2026): Marie-Françoise Gaume
- Area^{1}: 12.73 km^{2} (4.92 sq mi)
- Elevation: 500 m (1,600 ft)
- Highest elevation: 946 m (3,104 ft)
- Lowest elevation: 397 m (1,302 ft)
- Population (2023): 1,042
  - Density: 81.85/km^{2} (212.0/sq mi)
- Time zone: UTC+01:00 (CET)
  - Summer (DST): UTC+02:00 (CEST)
- INSEE/Postal code: 42331 /42155
- ^{1} French Land Register data, which excludes lakes, ponds, glaciers > 1 km^{2} (0.386 sq mi or 247 acres) and river estuaries.

Villemontais (French pronunciation: [vilmɔ̃tɛ]) is a commune in the Loire department in central France.

== Population ==
Historical population
Year	Pop.	±% p.a.
1968	742	—
1975	800	+1.08%
1982	926	+2.11%
1990	887	−0.54%
1999	935	+0.59%
2007	934	−0.01%
2012	985	+1.07%
2017	1,017	+0.64%
2023	1,042	+0.41%
Source: INSEE

== See also ==
- Communes of the Loire department
