= Juré =

- Commune
- Coat of arms
- Location of Juré
- Location within France Location within Auvergne-Rhône-Alpes
- Coordinates: 45°53′05″N 3°53′32″E
- Country: France
- Region: Auvergne-Rhône-Alpes
- Department: Loire
- Arrondissement: Roanne
- Canton: Renaison
- Intercommunality: Pays d'Urfé

Government
  - Mayor (2020–2026): Patrice Espinasse
- Area^{1}: 12.07 km^{2} (4.66 sq mi)
- Elevation: 560 m (1,840 ft)
- Highest elevation: 836 m (2,743 ft)
- Lowest elevation: 490 m (1,610 ft)
- Population (2023): 242
  - Density: 20.0/km^{2} (51.9/sq mi)
- Time zone: UTC+01:00 (CET)
  - Summer (DST): UTC+02:00 (CEST)
- INSEE/Postal code: 42116 /42430
- ^{1} French Land Register data, which excludes lakes, ponds, glaciers > 1 km^{2} (0.386 sq mi or 247 acres) and river estuaries.

Juré (French pronunciation: [ʒyʁe]) is a commune in the Loire department in central France.

== Population ==
Historical population
Year	Pop.	±% p.a.
1968	361	—
1975	272	−3.96%
1982	274	+0.10%
1990	208	−3.39%
1999	209	+0.05%
2007	248	+2.16%
2012	236	−0.99%
2017	242	+0.50%
2023	242	+0.00%
Source: INSEE

== See also ==
- Communes of the Loire department
