= Les Noës =

- Commune
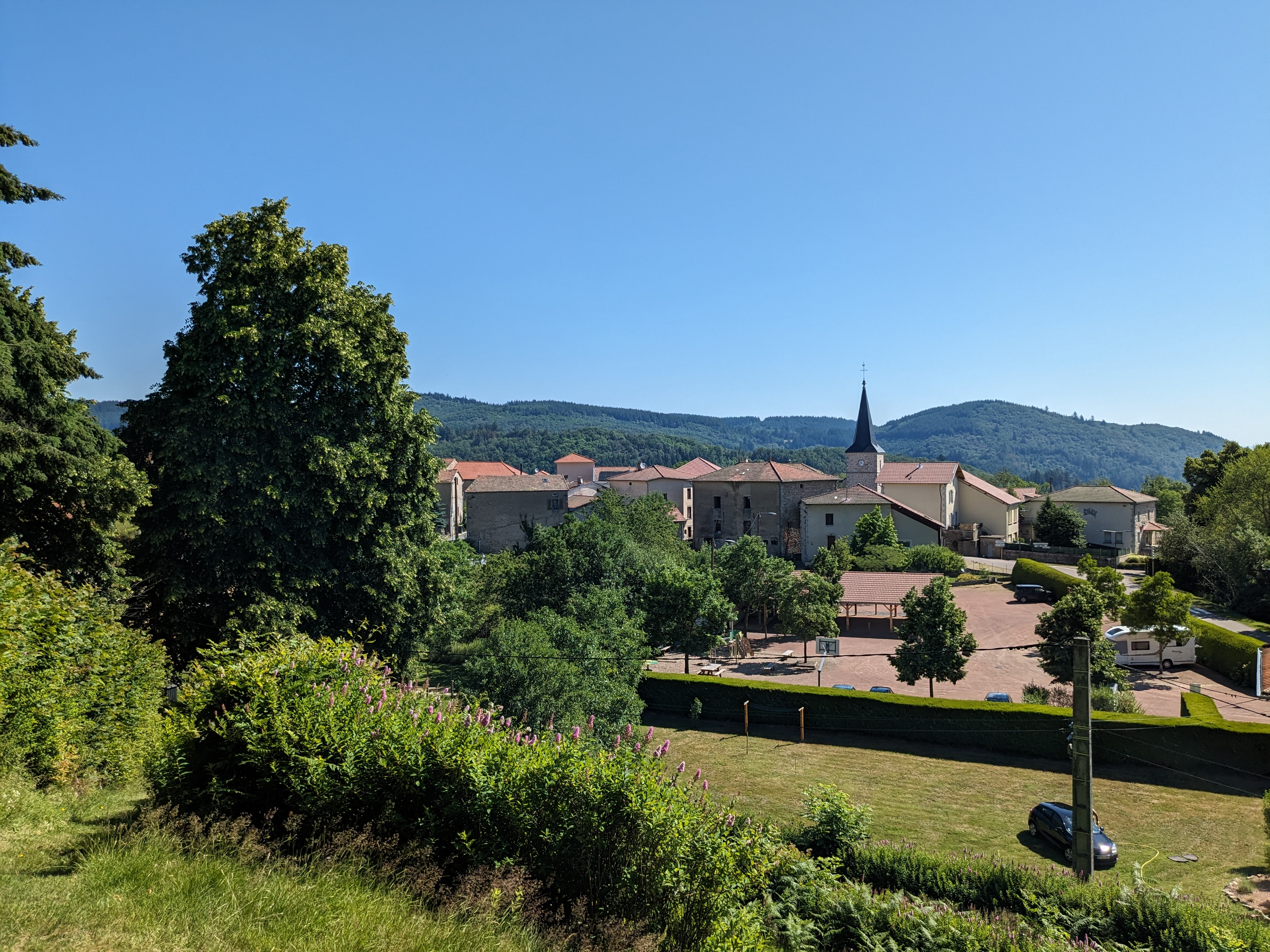
- The view of the village from the oratory

- Coat of arms
- Location of Les Noës
- Location within France Location within Auvergne-Rhône-Alpes
- Coordinates: 46°02′32″N 3°51′10″E
- Country: France
- Region: Auvergne-Rhône-Alpes
- Department: Loire
- Arrondissement: Roanne
- Canton: Renaison
- Intercommunality: Roannais Agglomération

Government
  - Mayor (2020–2026): Stéphane Raphaël
- Area^{1}: 15.68 km^{2} (6.05 sq mi)
- Elevation: 640 m (2,100 ft)
- Highest elevation: 1,122 m (3,681 ft)
- Lowest elevation: 497 m (1,631 ft)
- Population (2023): 209
  - Density: 13.3/km^{2} (34.5/sq mi)
- Time zone: UTC+01:00 (CET)
  - Summer (DST): UTC+02:00 (CEST)
- INSEE/Postal code: 42158 /42370
- ^{1} French Land Register data, which excludes lakes, ponds, glaciers > 1 km^{2} (0.386 sq mi or 247 acres) and river estuaries.

Les Noës (French pronunciation: [le no]) is a commune in the Loire department in central France.

== Population ==
Historical population
Year	Pop.	±% p.a.
1968	241	—
1975	179	−4.16%
1982	163	−1.33%
1990	148	−1.20%
1999	163	+1.08%
2007	161	−0.15%
2012	193	+3.69%
2017	208	+1.51%
2023	209	+0.08%
Source: INSEE

== See also ==
- Communes of the Loire department
