= Lentigny =

- Commune
- Location of Lentigny
- Location within France Location within Auvergne-Rhône-Alpes
- Coordinates: 45°59′46″N 3°58′54″E
- Country: France
- Region: Auvergne-Rhône-Alpes
- Department: Loire
- Arrondissement: Roanne
- Canton: Renaison
- Intercommunality: Roannais Agglomération

Government
  - Mayor (2021–2026): Christophe Potet
- Area^{1}: 11.3 km^{2} (4.4 sq mi)
- Elevation: 372 m (1,220 ft)
- Highest elevation: 440 m (1,440 ft)
- Lowest elevation: 320 m (1,050 ft)
- Population (2023): 1,794
  - Density: 159/km^{2} (411/sq mi)
- Time zone: UTC+01:00 (CET)
  - Summer (DST): UTC+02:00 (CEST)
- INSEE/Postal code: 42120 /42155
- ^{1} French Land Register data, which excludes lakes, ponds, glaciers > 1 km^{2} (0.386 sq mi or 247 acres) and river estuaries.

Lentigny (French pronunciation: [lɑ̃tiɲi]) is a commune in the Loire department in central France.

== Population ==
Historical population

Year	Pop.	±% p.a.
1793	350	—
1821	389	+0.38%
1851	503	+0.86%
1872	563	+0.54%
1901	906	+1.65%
1921	666	−1.53%
1946	612	−0.34%
1962	752	+1.30%
1968	842	+1.90%

Year	Pop.	±% p.a.
1975	1,010	+2.63%
1982	1,311	+3.80%
1990	1,411	+0.92%
1999	1,351	−0.48%
2007	1,410	+0.54%
2012	1,625	+2.88%
2017	1,736	+1.33%
2023	1,794	+0.55%

Source: EHESS and INSEE

== See also ==
- Communes of the Loire department
