= Cherier =

- Commune
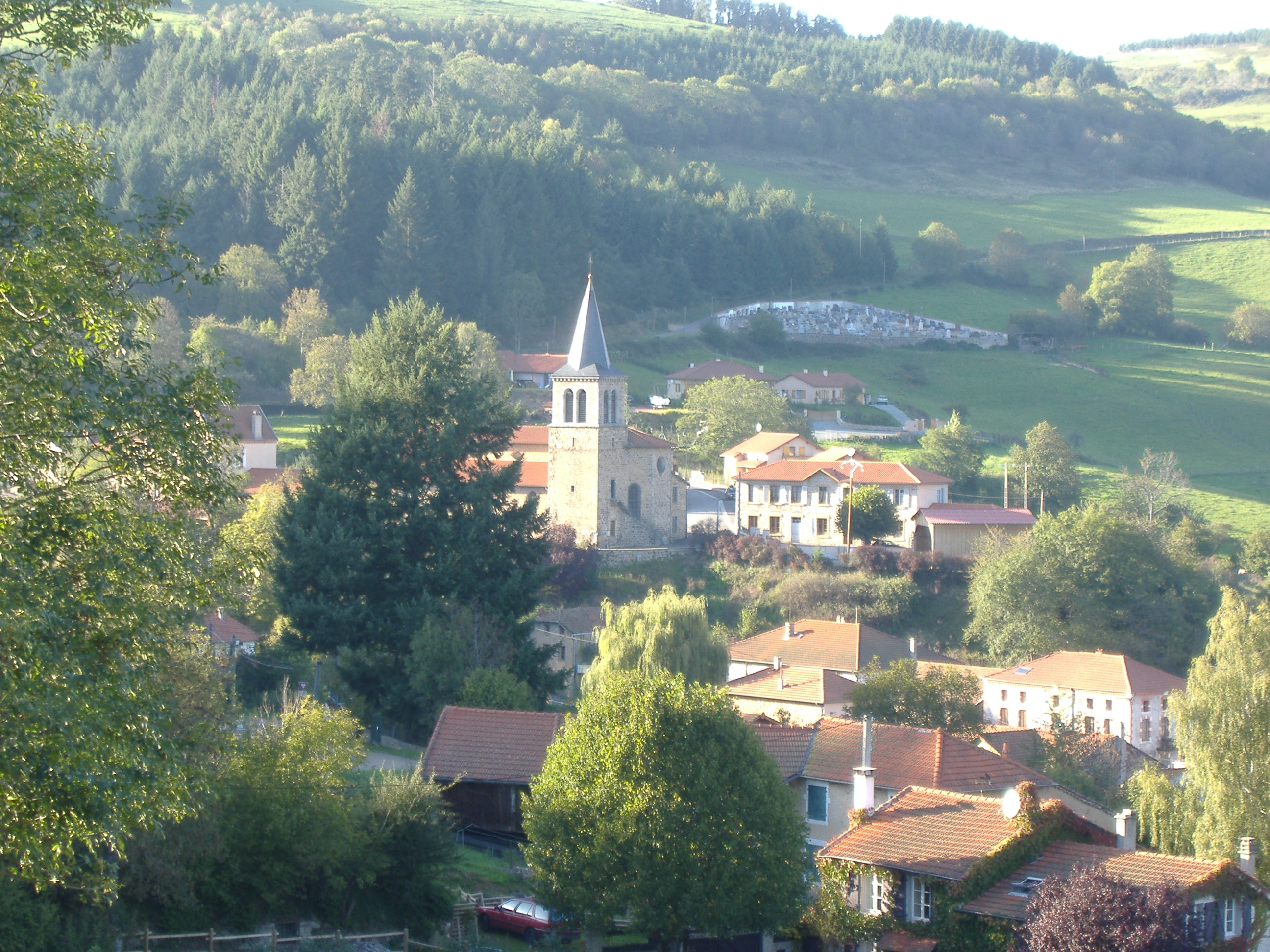
- Location of Cherier
- Location within France Location within Auvergne-Rhône-Alpes
- Coordinates: 45°57′56″N 3°54′37″E
- Country: France
- Region: Auvergne-Rhône-Alpes
- Department: Loire
- Arrondissement: Roanne
- Canton: Renaison
- Intercommunality: Pays d'Urfé

Government
  - Mayor (2020–2026): Charles Laboure
- Area^{1}: 28.11 km^{2} (10.85 sq mi)
- Elevation: 824 m (2,703 ft)
- Highest elevation: 1,156 m (3,793 ft)
- Lowest elevation: 594 m (1,949 ft)
- Population (2023): 523
  - Density: 18.6/km^{2} (48.2/sq mi)
- Time zone: UTC+01:00 (CET)
  - Summer (DST): UTC+02:00 (CEST)
- INSEE/Postal code: 42061 /42430
- ^{1} French Land Register data, which excludes lakes, ponds, glaciers > 1 km^{2} (0.386 sq mi or 247 acres) and river estuaries.

Cherier (French pronunciation: [ʃəʁje]) is a commune in the Loire department in central France.

== Population ==
Historical population
Year	Pop.	±% p.a.
1968	647	—
1975	595	−1.19%
1982	542	−1.32%
1990	482	−1.46%
1999	445	−0.88%
2007	469	+0.66%
2012	495	+1.08%
2017	559	+2.46%
2023	523	−1.10%
Source: INSEE

== See also ==
- Communes of the Loire department
