= Noailly =

- Commune
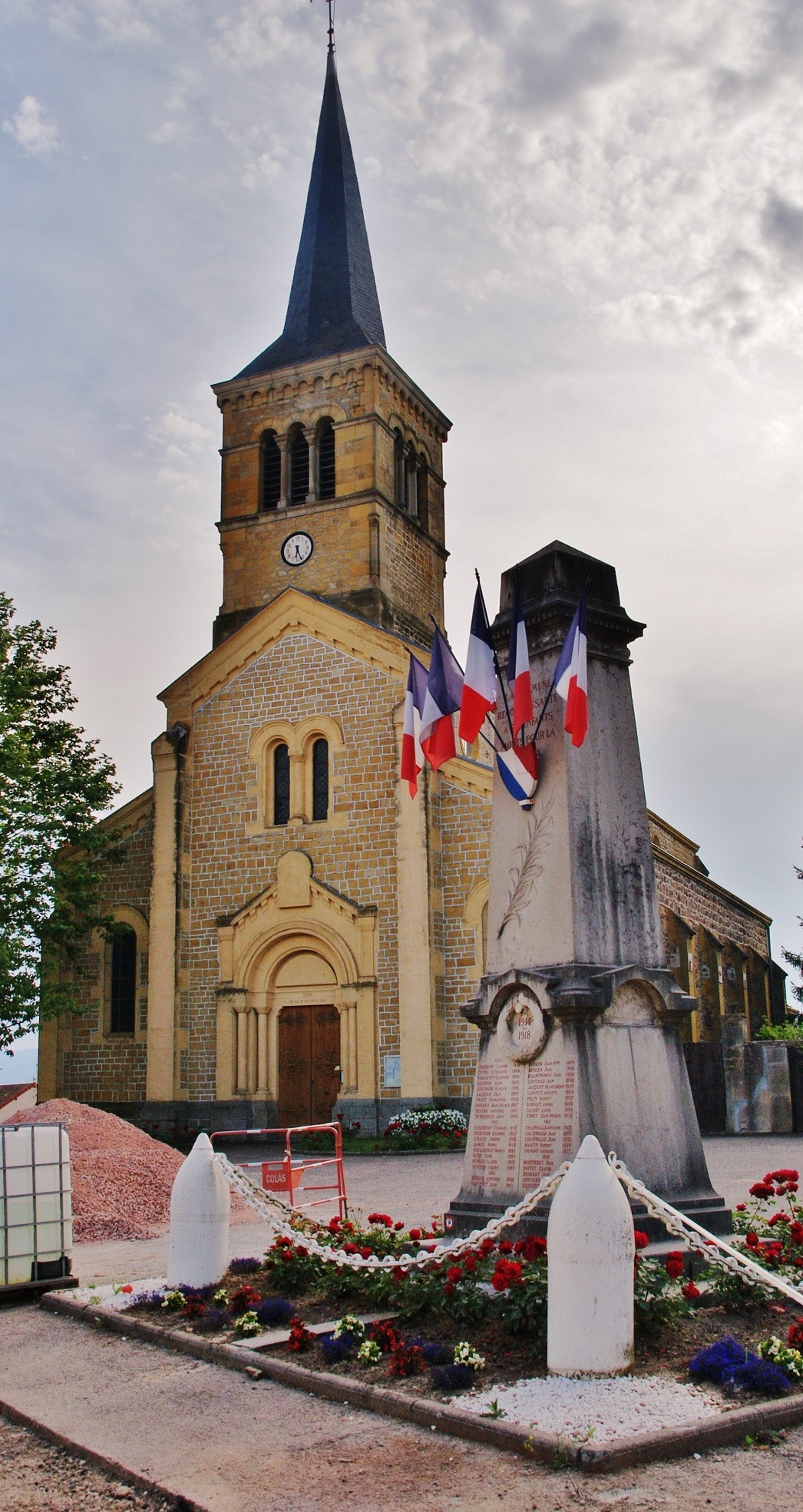
- Church and war memorial

- Coat of arms
- Location of Noailly
- Location within France Location within Auvergne-Rhône-Alpes
- Coordinates: 46°08′10″N 4°00′47″E
- Country: France
- Region: Auvergne-Rhône-Alpes
- Department: Loire
- Arrondissement: Roanne
- Canton: Renaison
- Intercommunality: Roannais Agglomération

Government
  - Mayor (2020–2026): Patrick Meunier
- Area^{1}: 31.45 km^{2} (12.14 sq mi)
- Elevation: 320 m (1,050 ft)
- Highest elevation: 363 m (1,191 ft)
- Lowest elevation: 268 m (879 ft)
- Population (2023): 824
  - Density: 26.2/km^{2} (67.9/sq mi)
- Time zone: UTC+01:00 (CET)
  - Summer (DST): UTC+02:00 (CEST)
- INSEE/Postal code: 42157 /42640
- ^{1} French Land Register data, which excludes lakes, ponds, glaciers > 1 km^{2} (0.386 sq mi or 247 acres) and river estuaries.

Noailly (French pronunciation: [nɔaji]) is a commune in the Loire department in central France.

== Population ==
Historical population
Year	Pop.	±% p.a.
1968	553	—
1975	526	−0.71%
1982	624	+2.47%
1990	727	+1.93%
1999	719	−0.12%
2007	737	+0.31%
2012	804	+1.76%
2017	802	−0.05%
2023	824	+0.45%
Source: INSEE

== See also ==
- Communes of the Loire department
