= La Tuilière =

- Commune
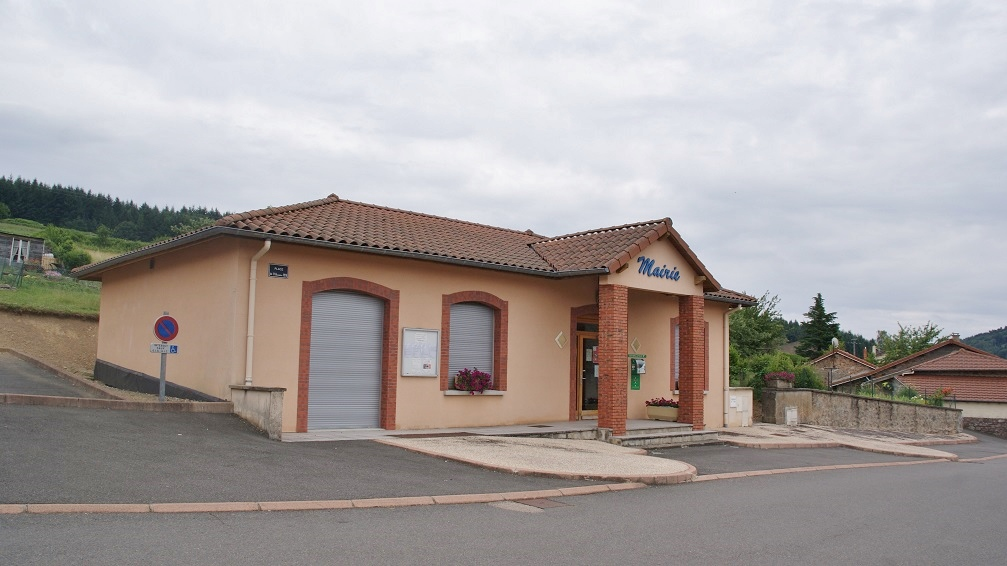
- Town hall
- Location of La Tuilière
- Location within France Location within Auvergne-Rhône-Alpes
- Coordinates: 45°56′44″N 3°48′09″E
- Country: France
- Region: Auvergne-Rhône-Alpes
- Department: Loire
- Arrondissement: Roanne
- Canton: Renaison
- Intercommunality: Pays d'Urfé

Government
  - Mayor (2020–2026): Thomas Siettel
- Area^{1}: 31.09 km^{2} (12.00 sq mi)
- Elevation: 699 m (2,293 ft)
- Highest elevation: 1,097 m (3,599 ft)
- Lowest elevation: 644 m (2,113 ft)
- Population (2023): 273
  - Density: 8.78/km^{2} (22.7/sq mi)
- Time zone: UTC+01:00 (CET)
  - Summer (DST): UTC+02:00 (CEST)
- INSEE/Postal code: 42314 /42830
- ^{1} French Land Register data, which excludes lakes, ponds, glaciers > 1 km^{2} (0.386 sq mi or 247 acres) and river estuaries.

La Tuilière (French pronunciation: [la tɥiljɛʁ]) is a commune in the Loire department in central France.

== Population ==
Historical population
Year	Pop.	±% p.a.
1968	485	—
1975	424	−1.90%
1982	362	−2.23%
1990	362	+0.00%
1999	321	−1.33%
2007	299	−0.88%
2012	283	−1.09%
2017	289	+0.42%
2023	273	−0.94%
Source: INSEE

== See also ==
- Communes of the Loire department
