= Saint-Marcel-d'Urfé =

- Commune
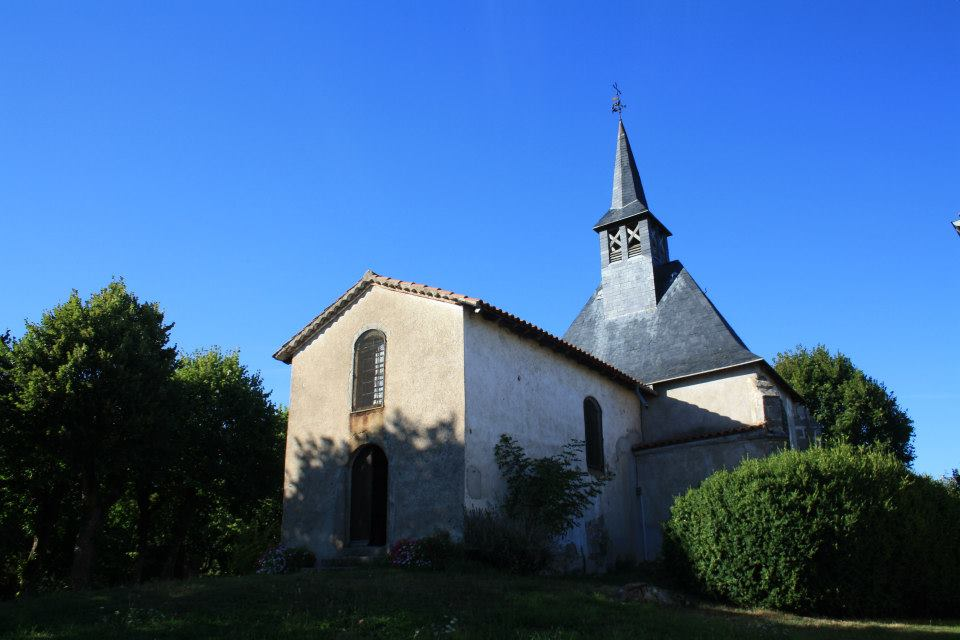

- Coat of arms
- Location of Saint-Marcel-d'Urfé
- Location within France Location within Auvergne-Rhône-Alpes
- Coordinates: 45°52′25″N 3°53′09″E
- Country: France
- Region: Auvergne-Rhône-Alpes
- Department: Loire
- Arrondissement: Roanne
- Canton: Renaison
- Intercommunality: Pays d'Urfé

Government
  - Mayor (2020–2026): Guy Crozet
- Area^{1}: 13.92 km^{2} (5.37 sq mi)
- Highest elevation: 900 m (3,000 ft)
- Lowest elevation: 491 m (1,611 ft)
- Population (2023): 268
  - Density: 19.3/km^{2} (49.9/sq mi)
- Time zone: UTC+01:00 (CET)
  - Summer (DST): UTC+02:00 (CEST)
- INSEE/Postal code: 42255 /42430
- ^{1} French Land Register data, which excludes lakes, ponds, glaciers > 1 km^{2} (0.386 sq mi or 247 acres) and river estuaries.

Saint-Marcel-d'Urfé (French pronunciation: [sɛ̃ maʁsɛl dyʁfe]) is a commune in the Loire department in central France.

== Population ==
Historical population
Year	Pop.	±% p.a.
1968	336	—
1975	310	−1.14%
1982	301	−0.42%
1990	268	−1.44%
1999	264	−0.17%
2007	299	+1.57%
2012	289	−0.68%
2017	290	+0.07%
2023	268	−1.31%
Source: INSEE

== See also ==
- Communes of the Loire department
