= Saint-Martin-d'Estréaux =

- Commune
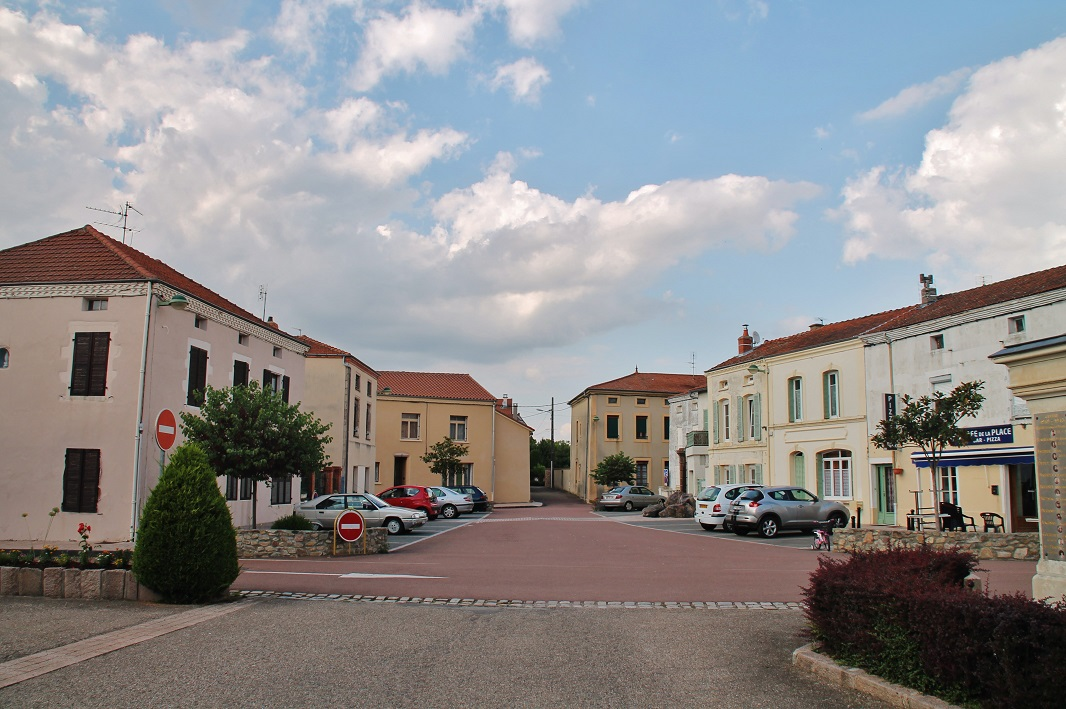
- Location of Saint-Martin-d'Estréaux
- Location within France Location within Auvergne-Rhône-Alpes
- Coordinates: 46°12′25″N 3°47′57″E
- Country: France
- Region: Auvergne-Rhône-Alpes
- Department: Loire
- Arrondissement: Roanne
- Canton: Renaison
- Intercommunality: Roannais Agglomération

Government
  - Mayor (2020–2026): Christine Araneo
- Area^{1}: 29.6 km^{2} (11.4 sq mi)
- Elevation: 470 m (1,540 ft)
- Highest elevation: 589 m (1,932 ft)
- Lowest elevation: 298 m (978 ft)
- Population (2023): 845
  - Density: 28.5/km^{2} (73.9/sq mi)
- Time zone: UTC+01:00 (CET)
  - Summer (DST): UTC+02:00 (CEST)
- INSEE/Postal code: 42257 /42620
- ^{1} French Land Register data, which excludes lakes, ponds, glaciers > 1 km^{2} (0.386 sq mi or 247 acres) and river estuaries.

Saint-Martin-d'Estréaux (French pronunciation: [sɛ̃ maʁtɛ̃ dɛstʁeo]) is a commune in the Loire department in central France.

== Population ==
Historical population
| Year | Pop. | ±% p.a. |
|---|---|---|
| 1968 | 1,232 | — |
| 1975 | 1,438 | +2.23% |
| 1982 | 1,279 | −1.66% |
| 1990 | 1,090 | −1.98% |
| 1999 | 956 | −1.45% |
| 2007 | 905 | −0.68% |
| 2012 | 890 | −0.33% |
| 2017 | 839 | −1.17% |
| 2023 | 845 | +0.12% |
Source: INSEE

== See also ==
- Communes of the Loire department
