= Vivans =

- Commune
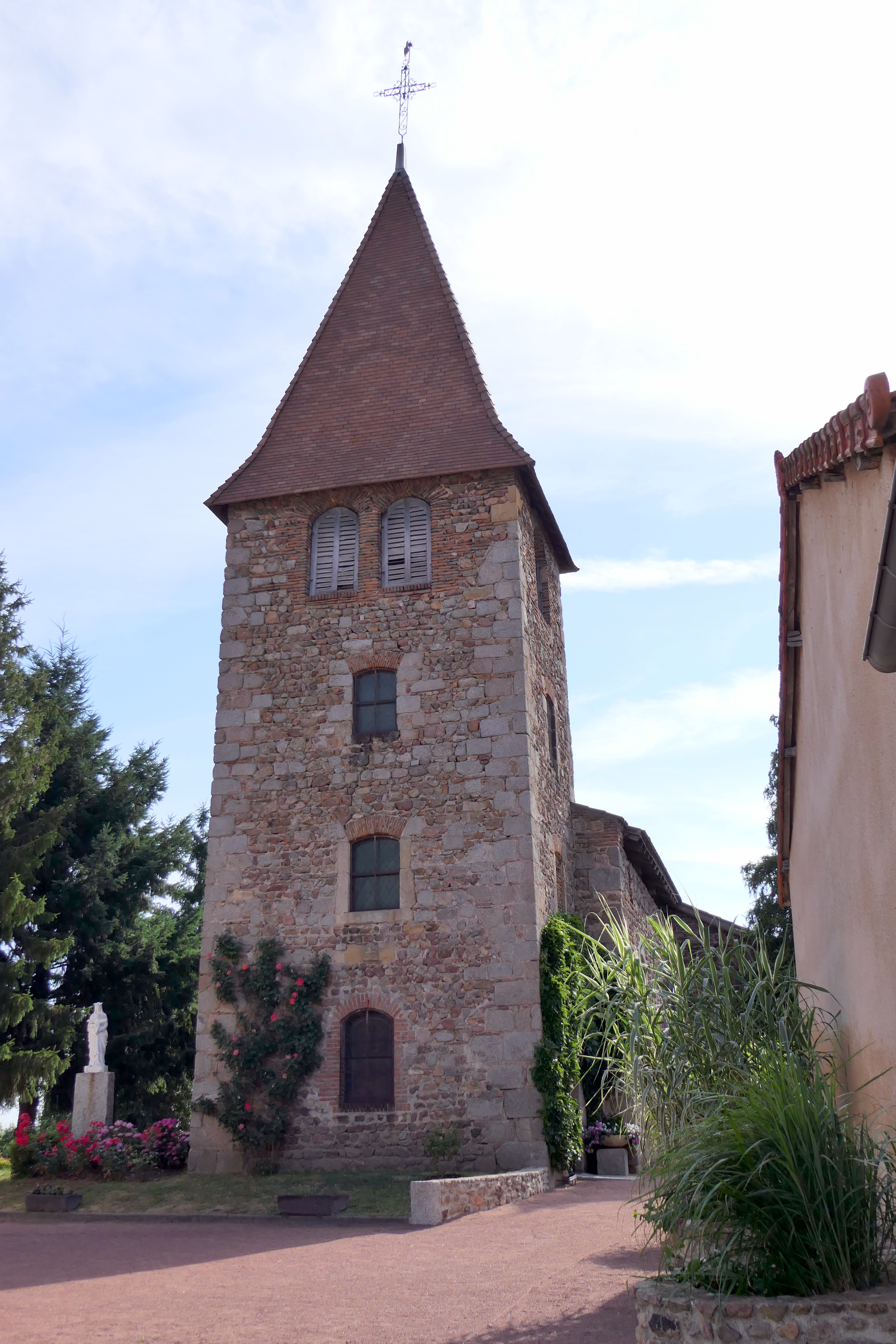
- Location of Vivans
- Location within France Location within Auvergne-Rhône-Alpes
- Coordinates: 46°11′25″N 3°56′36″E
- Country: France
- Region: Auvergne-Rhône-Alpes
- Department: Loire
- Arrondissement: Roanne
- Canton: Renaison
- Intercommunality: Roannais Agglomération

Government
  - Mayor (2020–2026): Guy Lafay
- Area^{1}: 25.16 km^{2} (9.71 sq mi)
- Elevation: 315 m (1,033 ft)
- Highest elevation: 364 m (1,194 ft)
- Lowest elevation: 282 m (925 ft)
- Population (2023): 242
  - Density: 9.62/km^{2} (24.9/sq mi)
- Time zone: UTC+01:00 (CET)
  - Summer (DST): UTC+02:00 (CEST)
- INSEE/Postal code: 42337 /42310
- ^{1} French Land Register data, which excludes lakes, ponds, glaciers > 1 km^{2} (0.386 sq mi or 247 acres) and river estuaries.

Vivans is a commune in the Loire department in central France.

== Population ==
Historical population
Year	Pop.	±% p.a.
1968	365	—
1975	317	−1.99%
1982	306	−0.50%
1990	262	−1.92%
1999	260	−0.09%
2007	249	−0.54%
2012	240	−0.73%
2017	230	−0.85%
2023	242	+0.85%
Source: INSEE

== See also ==
- Communes of the Loire department
