= Saint-André-d'Apchon =

- Commune
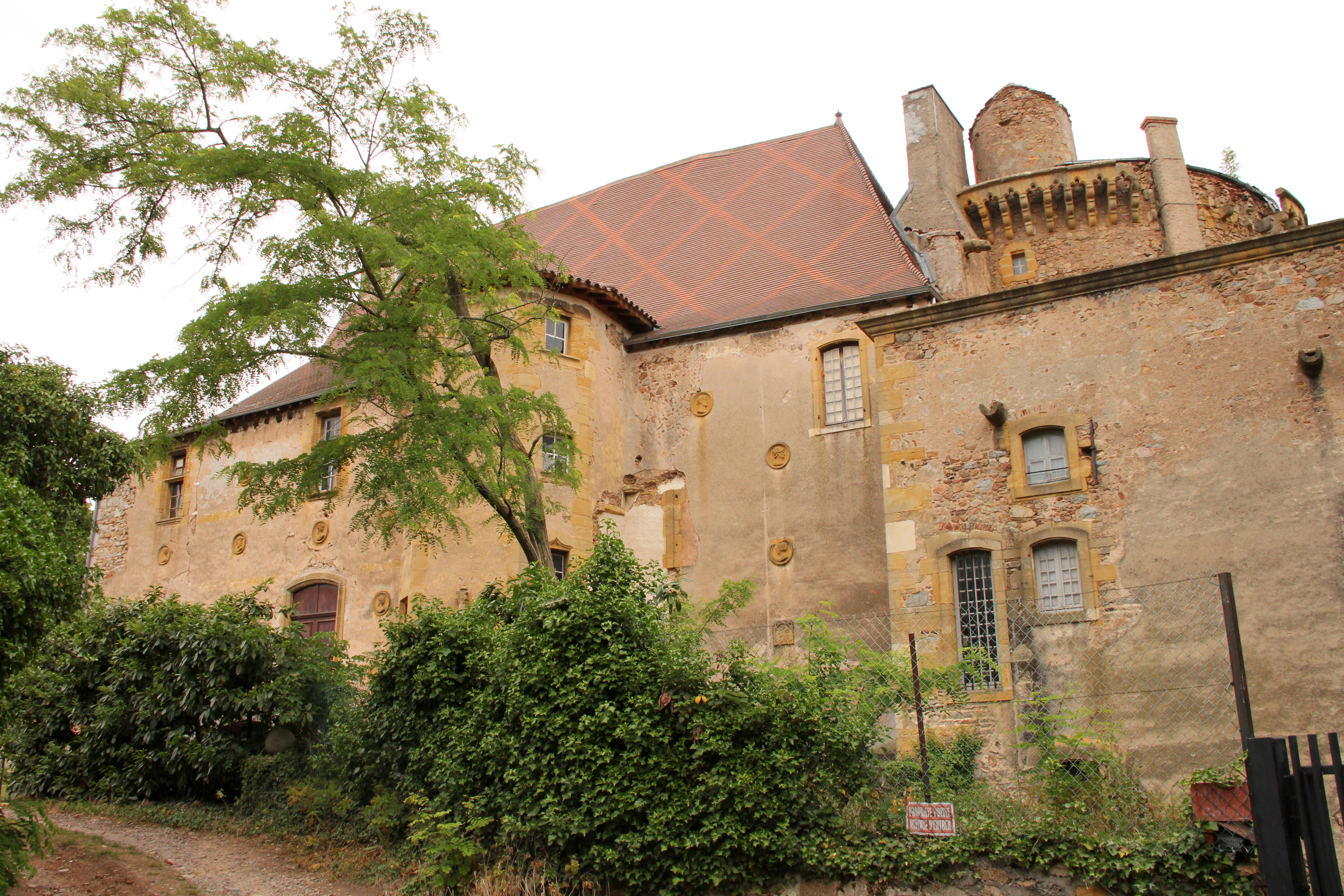
- Chateau

- Coat of arms
- Location of Saint-André-d'Apchon
- Location within France Location within Auvergne-Rhône-Alpes
- Coordinates: 46°01′59″N 3°55′52″E
- Country: France
- Region: Auvergne-Rhône-Alpes
- Department: Loire
- Arrondissement: Roanne
- Canton: Renaison
- Intercommunality: Roannais Agglomération

Government
  - Mayor (2020–2026): Martine Roffat
- Area^{1}: 13.44 km^{2} (5.19 sq mi)
- Elevation: 416 m (1,365 ft)
- Highest elevation: 808 m (2,651 ft)
- Lowest elevation: 327 m (1,073 ft)
- Population (2023): 1,966
  - Density: 146.3/km^{2} (378.9/sq mi)
- Time zone: UTC+01:00 (CET)
  - Summer (DST): UTC+02:00 (CEST)
- INSEE/Postal code: 42199 /42370
- ^{1} French Land Register data, which excludes lakes, ponds, glaciers > 1 km^{2} (0.386 sq mi or 247 acres) and river estuaries.

Saint-André-d'Apchon (French pronunciation: [sɛ̃.t‿ɑ̃dʁe dapʃɔ̃]) is a commune in the Loire department in central France.

== Population ==
Historical population
Year	Pop.	±% p.a.
1968	1,155	—
1975	1,347	+2.22%
1982	1,699	+3.37%
1990	1,720	+0.15%
1999	1,741	+0.13%
2007	1,855	+0.80%
2012	1,917	+0.66%
2017	1,946	+0.30%
2023	1,966	+0.17%
Source: INSEE

== See also ==
- Communes of the Loire department
