= Le Crozet =

- Commune
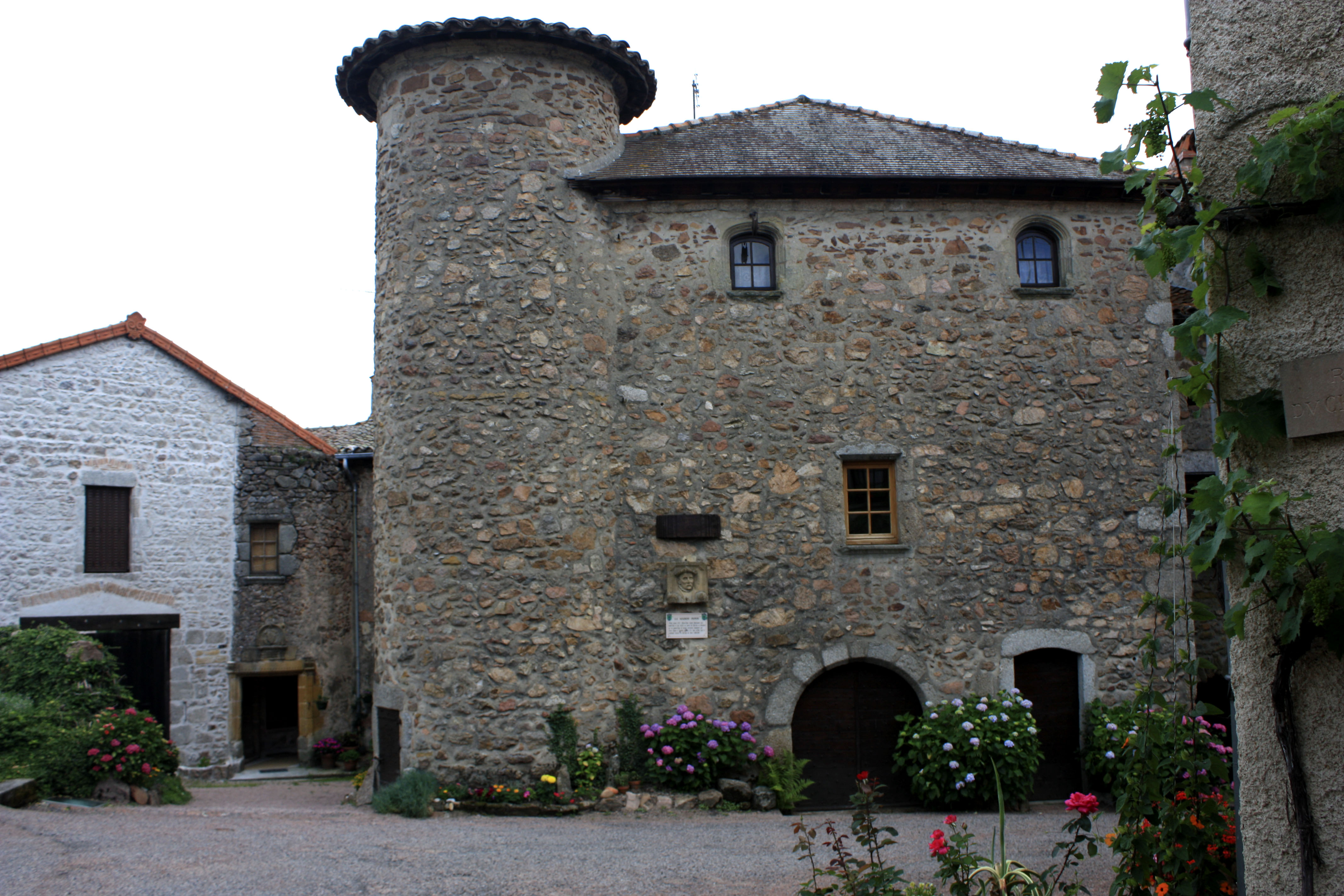
- Jean Papou house

- Coat of arms
- Location of Le Crozet
- Location within France Location within Auvergne-Rhône-Alpes
- Coordinates: 46°10′17″N 3°51′20″E
- Country: France
- Region: Auvergne-Rhône-Alpes
- Department: Loire
- Arrondissement: Roanne
- Canton: Renaison
- Intercommunality: Roannais Agglomération

Government
  - Mayor (2020–2026): Nicolas Chargueros
- Area^{1}: 13.31 km^{2} (5.14 sq mi)
- Elevation: 450 m (1,480 ft)
- Highest elevation: 595 m (1,952 ft)
- Lowest elevation: 344 m (1,129 ft)
- Population (2023): 252
  - Density: 18.9/km^{2} (49.0/sq mi)
- Time zone: UTC+01:00 (CET)
  - Summer (DST): UTC+02:00 (CEST)
- INSEE/Postal code: 42078 /42310
- ^{1} French Land Register data, which excludes lakes, ponds, glaciers > 1 km^{2} (0.386 sq mi or 247 acres) and river estuaries.

Le Crozet (French pronunciation: [lə kʁozɛ]) is a commune in the Loire department in central France.

== Population ==
Historical population
Year	Pop.	±% p.a.
1968	336	—
1975	285	−2.32%
1982	290	+0.25%
1990	292	+0.09%
1999	295	+0.11%
2007	282	−0.56%
2012	293	+0.77%
2017	272	−1.48%
2023	252	−1.26%
Source: INSEE

== See also ==
- Communes of the Loire department
