= Renaison =

- Commune
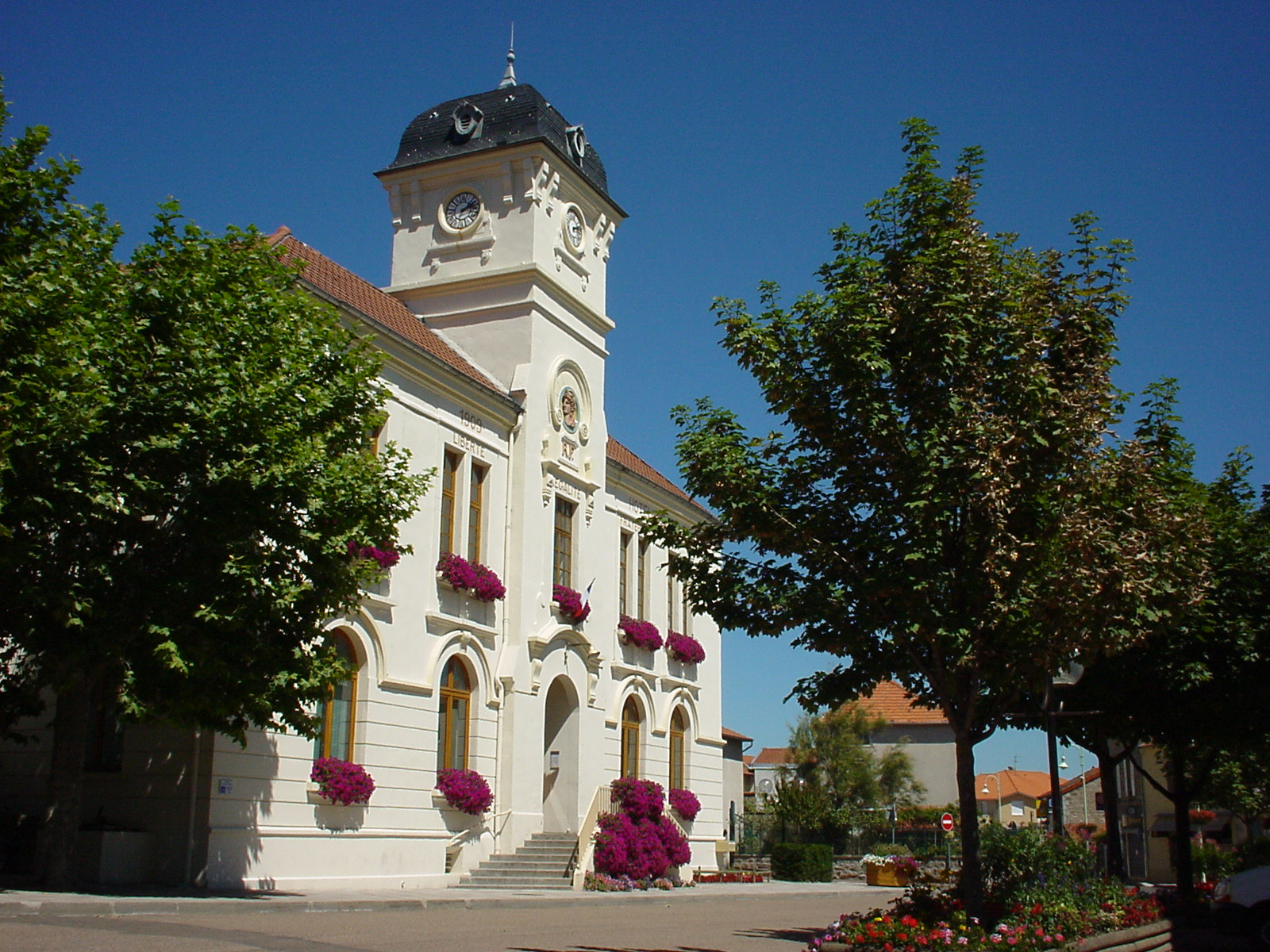
- Town hall

- Coat of arms
- Location of Renaison
- Location within France Location within Auvergne-Rhône-Alpes
- Coordinates: 46.0528°N 3.9256°E
- Country: France
- Region: Auvergne-Rhône-Alpes
- Department: Loire
- Arrondissement: Roanne
- Canton: Renaison
- Intercommunality: Roannais Agglomération

Government
  - Mayor (2020–2026): Laurent Beluze
- Area^{1}: 23.04 km^{2} (8.90 sq mi)
- Elevation: 382 m (1,253 ft)
- Highest elevation: 820 m (2,690 ft)
- Lowest elevation: 327 m (1,073 ft)
- Population (2023): 3,231
  - Density: 140.2/km^{2} (363.2/sq mi)
- Time zone: UTC+01:00 (CET)
  - Summer (DST): UTC+02:00 (CEST)
- INSEE/Postal code: 42182 /42370
- ^{1} French Land Register data, which excludes lakes, ponds, glaciers > 1 km^{2} (0.386 sq mi or 247 acres) and river estuaries.

Renaison (French pronunciation: [ʁənɛzɔ̃]) is a commune in the Loire department of central France.

== Geography ==
Renaison lies in the north-western part of the department of the Loire, 10 km west of Roanne in the canton of Renaison. The municipality covers the first foothills of la Madeleine, in the Roanne area.

The Chartrain dam (or La Tache dam) and Rouchain dam are located on the territory of the commune. They are used for water supply throughout the Roanne area.

The area is known mostly for viticulture.

== History ==
Region seems to have been inhabited since ancient times. Well trimmed flints were found in Panetière, a standing stone in Peuil. Roman era substructures were discovered at La Croix-Dieu. The origin of the parish dates back to the Christian period.

In 1294, the difficulties between the secular and ecclesiastical co-reigning lords of the country, the Counts of Forez and the prior of Ambierle, were resolved by an agreement regulating the rights of justice, in particular.

Around that time, crusaders brought back Palestinian local names for different localities: Renaison, Montlivet, Judea. Walls protecting the castle and town were built in the early 14th century. In the 15th century, the great financier of King Charles VII, Jacques Coeur, acquired the eastern Renaison area. The city was sacked by the Calvinists in 1576, in 1591 and 1592-1593. Plague ravaged the area in 1629-1630. Passages of soldiers who "lived by theft and rapine" sparked a riot in 1691.

During the French Revolution, the co-lordship ends. Saint-Haon-le-Châtel replaced Renaison as the chief town of canton. This created financial and administrative difficulties for Renaison.

After the Congress of Vienna in 1815, marking the end of more than two decades of the Revolutionary/Napoleonic Wars, Renaison began to recover and become prosperous from its vineyards, mills on the river, crafts and shops, allowing a bourgeoisie to emerge. (Almost all the vineyards were destroyed by an epidemic of phylloxera in the late 20th century.)

In 1888, city of Roanne started the construction of the gravity type La Tache dam which was completed in 1891. St Peter's Church in Renaison was built in 1896. During the 20th century, the vineyard was rebuilt and the biscuit industry grew. Renaison becomes the common coast main Roanne. The town hall and the church tower were built in 1909. In the same year the railway from Roanne to Ambierle, known as Le Tacot serving the entire Roanne valley, started operating.

During the First World War, of the 423 drafted inhabitants of Renaison, 69 were killed and 17 were recorded as missing. During the Second World War, of 190 drafted inhabitants, 15 were killed and 3 were recorded as missing. On August 10, 1944, German soldiers set fire to several buildings in retaliation for the resistance which was well established in Renaison. 28 young Renaisonnais were deported. Therefore the municipality was awarded the Croix de Guerre 1939-1945 with the Bronze Star.

In 1969, the town was twinned with Gruyères (Switzerland).

A second dam, the rockfill Le Rouchain dam was built between 1970 and 1975. In 1976, a kindergarten was built, followed closely by a college in 1978. It will be extended in 1983 and 2006. A second match was signed in 1992 with Pagouda (Togo). On 14 February 1994, the entire vineyard Coast roannaise gets the designation of origin (AOC). In 1998, the town hall is enlarged and the work of redevelopment begins. In 2003, Renaison enters the Community of communes from West Roannais (CCOR).

== Administration ==
Mayors of Renaison:

- 1884 - 1886: François Roudillon
- 1886 - 1891: Pierre Rajot
- 1891 - 1904: Ludovic Sardaine
- 1904 - 1919: Gilbert Barathon
- 1919 - 1929: Stéphane Bertaud
- 1929 - 1935: Joannès Forge
- 1935 - 1944: Stéphane Bertaud
- 1944 - 1961: Victor Bonne
- 1961 - 1965: Antoine Bouchery
- 1965 - 1971: Joannès Duivon
- 1971 - 1989: Robert Barathon
- 1989 - 1995: Henri Bertaud
- 1995 - 2008: Jean-Claude Saby
- 2008 - : Jacques Thirouin

== Population ==
Historical population

Year	Pop.	±% p.a.
1793	1,700	—
1806	1,528	−0.82%
1821	1,909	+1.50%
1831	1,974	+0.34%
1841	1,913	−0.31%
1851	1,818	−0.51%
1861	1,843	+0.14%
1872	1,997	+0.73%
1881	2,002	+0.03%
1891	2,825	+3.50%
1901	2,432	−1.49%
1911	2,093	−1.49%
1921	1,801	−1.49%

Year	Pop.	±% p.a.
1931	1,889	+0.48%
1946	1,881	−0.03%
1954	1,895	+0.09%
1962	1,713	−1.25%
1968	1,780	+0.64%
1975	1,918	+1.07%
1982	2,251	+2.31%
1990	2,563	+1.64%
1999	2,653	+0.38%
2007	2,832	+0.82%
2012	2,924	+0.64%
2017	3,143	+1.45%
2023	3,231	+0.46%

Source: EHESS and INSEE

== Economy ==
The company "Délice du Palais" destroyed by fire July 30, 2007, was rebuilt on the area of La Grange Vignat and opened February 6, 2009 by Hervé Novelli, Secretary of State for Trade, Crafts, SMEs, tourism and services. The agribusiness company employs 120 employees.

== Sites and monuments ==
- L'église ST Pierre (ST Peter church) was built in 1896, its bell tower was built in 1909. This is a church with a neo-Romanesque nave with buttresses, a transept, an apse with four apses and a high tower in front. Furthermore, an organ is present in the church. It was sold in 1981 by the work of the chapel of St. Nicolas (Paris) to the association of St Roch Renaison. It was a historical monument in November 12, 1991.
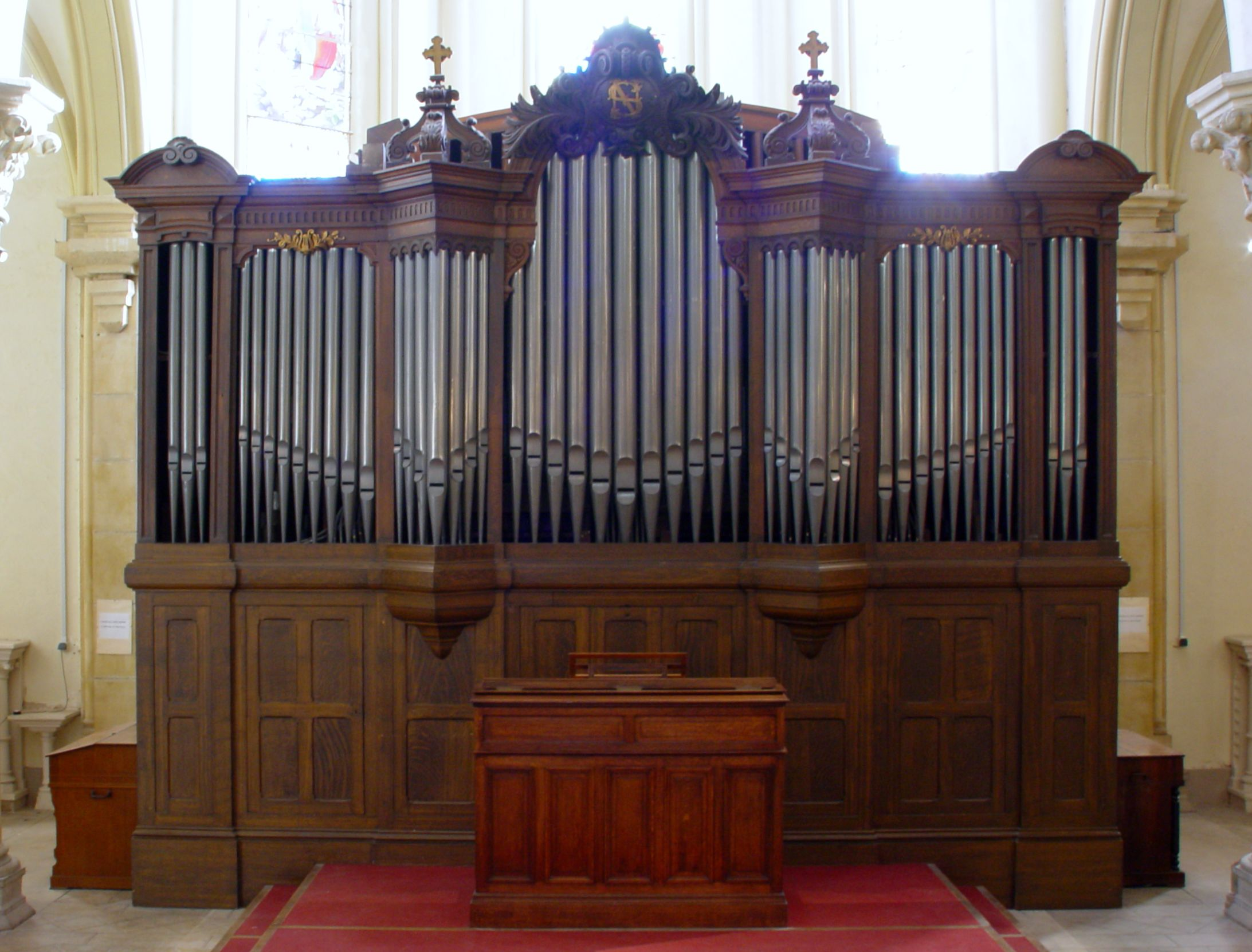
Orgue historique

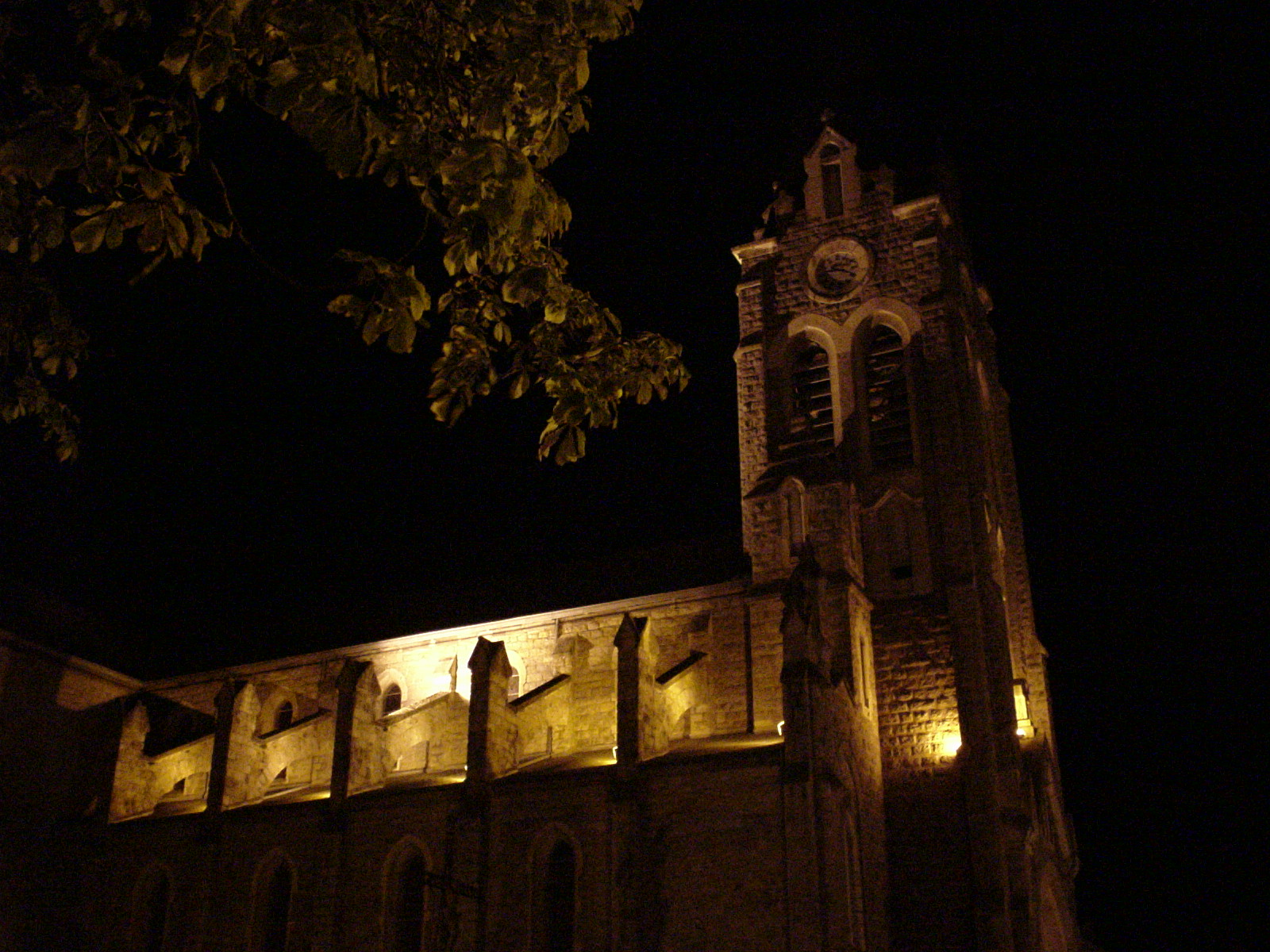
Église de nuit
- La chapelle Saint-Roch La chapelle Saint-Roch (The chapel of St. Roch) was built in 1869 by M. CHATARD (architect) was surrendered to the worship of the parish at the end of its construction in 1872.
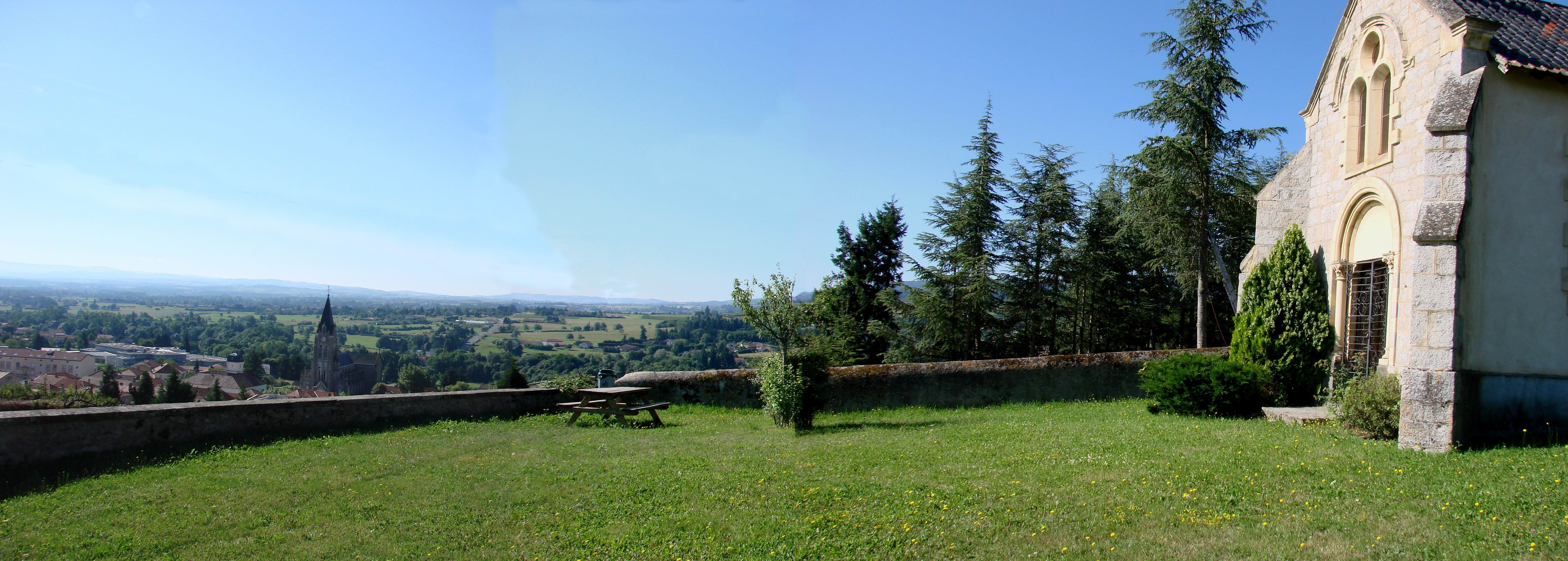
L'esplanade de la chapelle St Roch

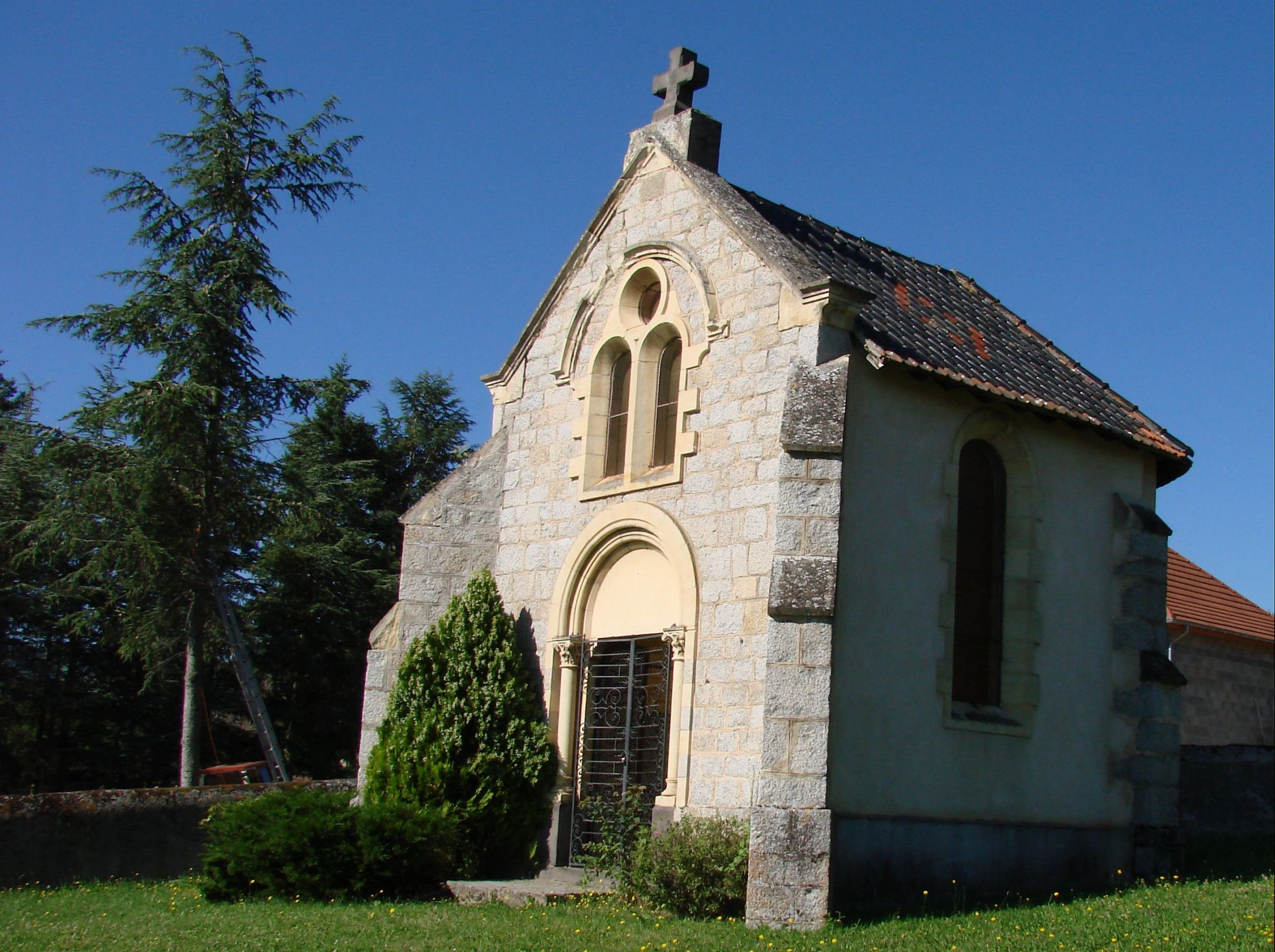
Chapelle St Roch
- Le château de Beaucresson Castle Beaucresson This is private property. It is located at a place called with his name on the road from Saint-Germain Lespinasse and goes back to the 15th century. It has a special situation because it straddles the towns of Renaison and St Haon le Vieux. Ancient fortified castle surrounded by moats which were marked each corner of a tower. One of them is still standing today.
- Le château de la Bernarde The castle of La Bernarde This is a private estate. It is open to the public during the Heritage Day every two years and for certain occasions. It was built in 1720-1750. It is partly classified as a historical monument since May 16, 1979.
- La château de Taron The Castle Taron It dates from the 17th century. It's a castle courtyard, landscaped gardens, drawbridge and terrace. It is now a Medical Institute.
- The Chartrain dam (or La Tache dam) gravity dam built between 1888 and 1891, is a beautiful work of art in stone masonry. Put in operation 1892, this dam is one of the oldest dams of France, after the Gorges d'Enfer dam and Pas-du-Riot dam on the river Furan built slightly earlier.
- The Rouchain rockfill dam built in 1976. It is separated from the dam Chartrain by a rocky ridge.
- College Of The Coast Roannaise Where students come from Saint-Romain-La-Motte, St. Haon-Le-Vieux, St. Haon-Le-Chatel, Renaison, Les Noës, Saint-Germain-Lespinasse, Saint Andre D'Apchon, Saint Alban les eaux.

== Personalities linked to the common ==
- Claude-Jérome-Polydore Cartier (1796–1886), bodyguard of Louis XVIII and Charles X.
- Jean Duclos (1891–1968), doctor who founded the first French center of stomatology in Lyon. (1946).
- Jean-Marie Goutaudier (1894–1949), Croix de Guerre with two palms and a star and made a Knight of the "Legion d'honneur" by President Raymond Poincaré for feats of arms during the First World War.
- Jacques Magnet (1933–2001), son of the architect Marcel Magnet, President of Chamber at the Cour des Comptes and author of numerous books on public finances.
- Robert Serol, grower, developer of the Roannaise Coast that operates some of its vines with "Grand Chef" Pierre Troisgros.

== Twinning ==
- Gruyères, Switzerland, since 28 June 1969
- Pagouda, Togo, since June 1994

== Gallery ==
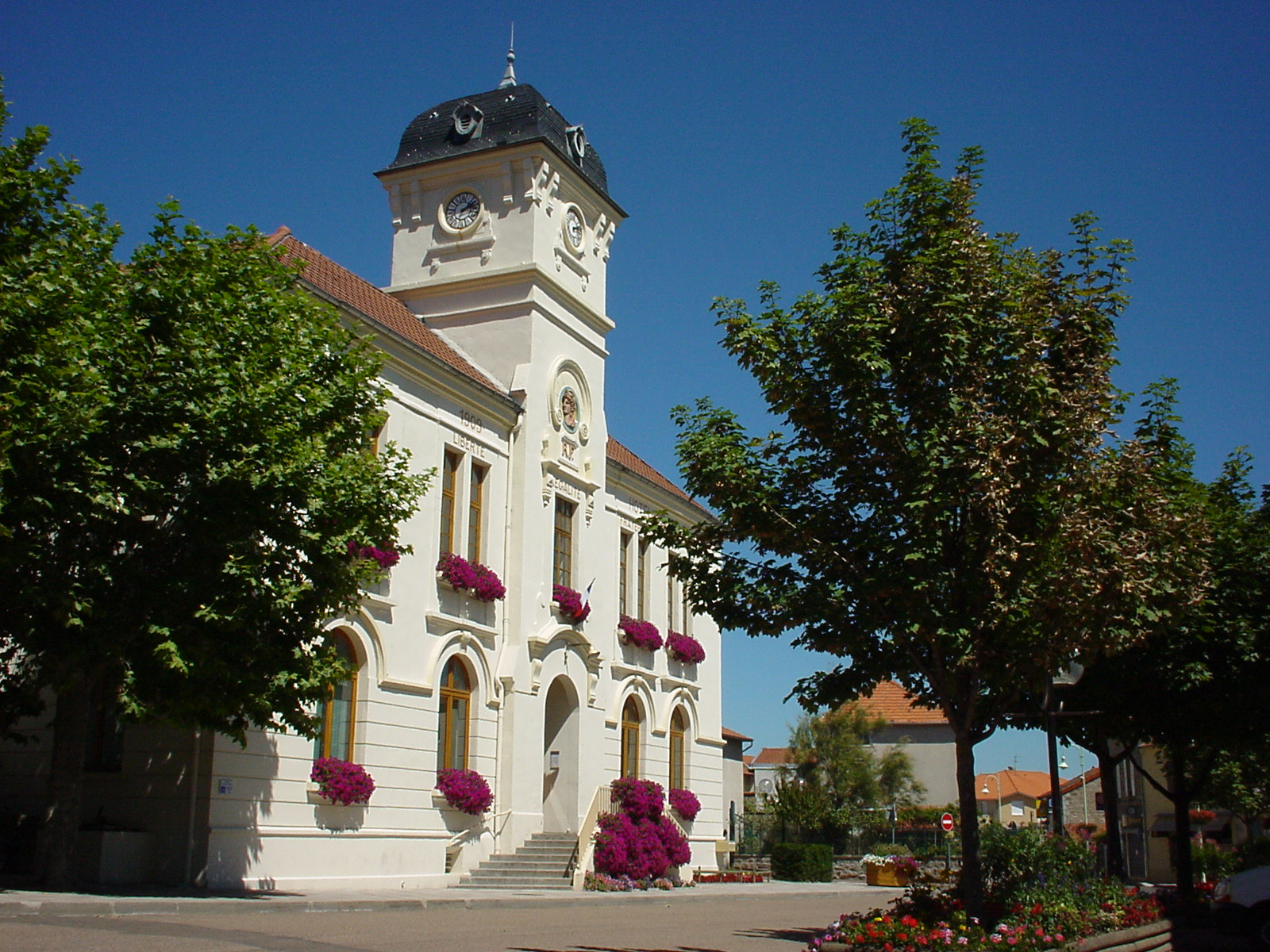
Town hall

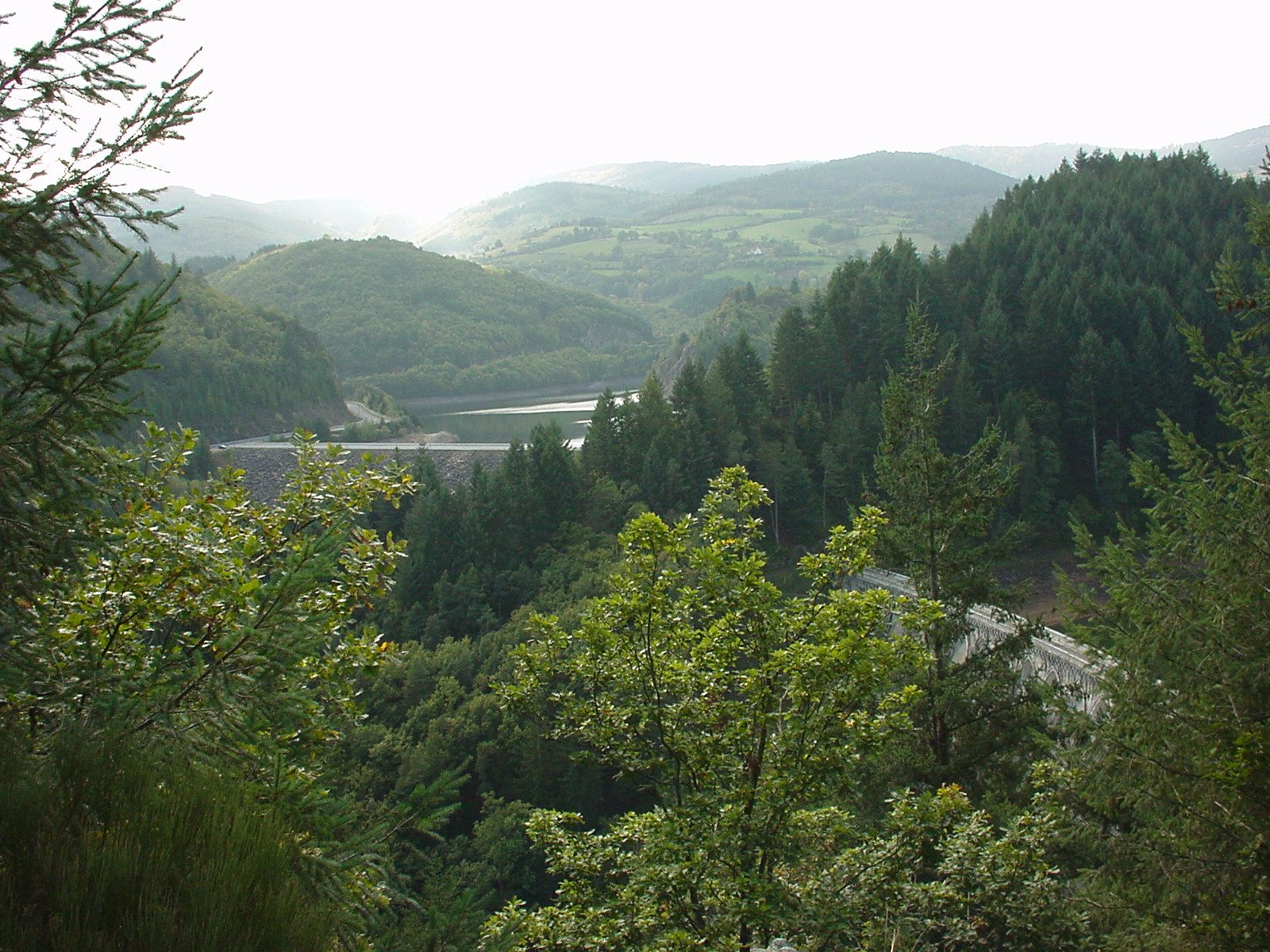
The two dams

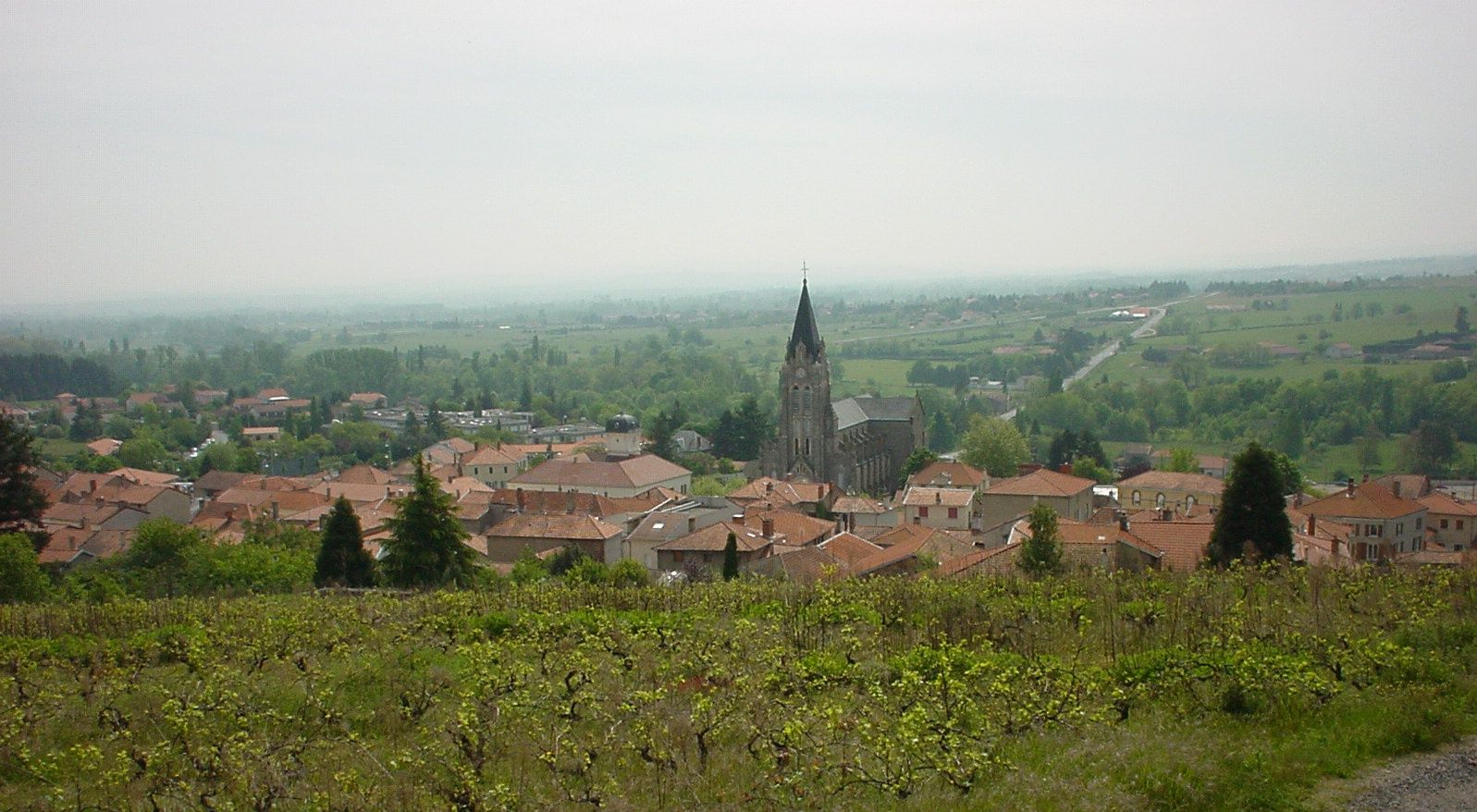
The village, seen from the vineyards

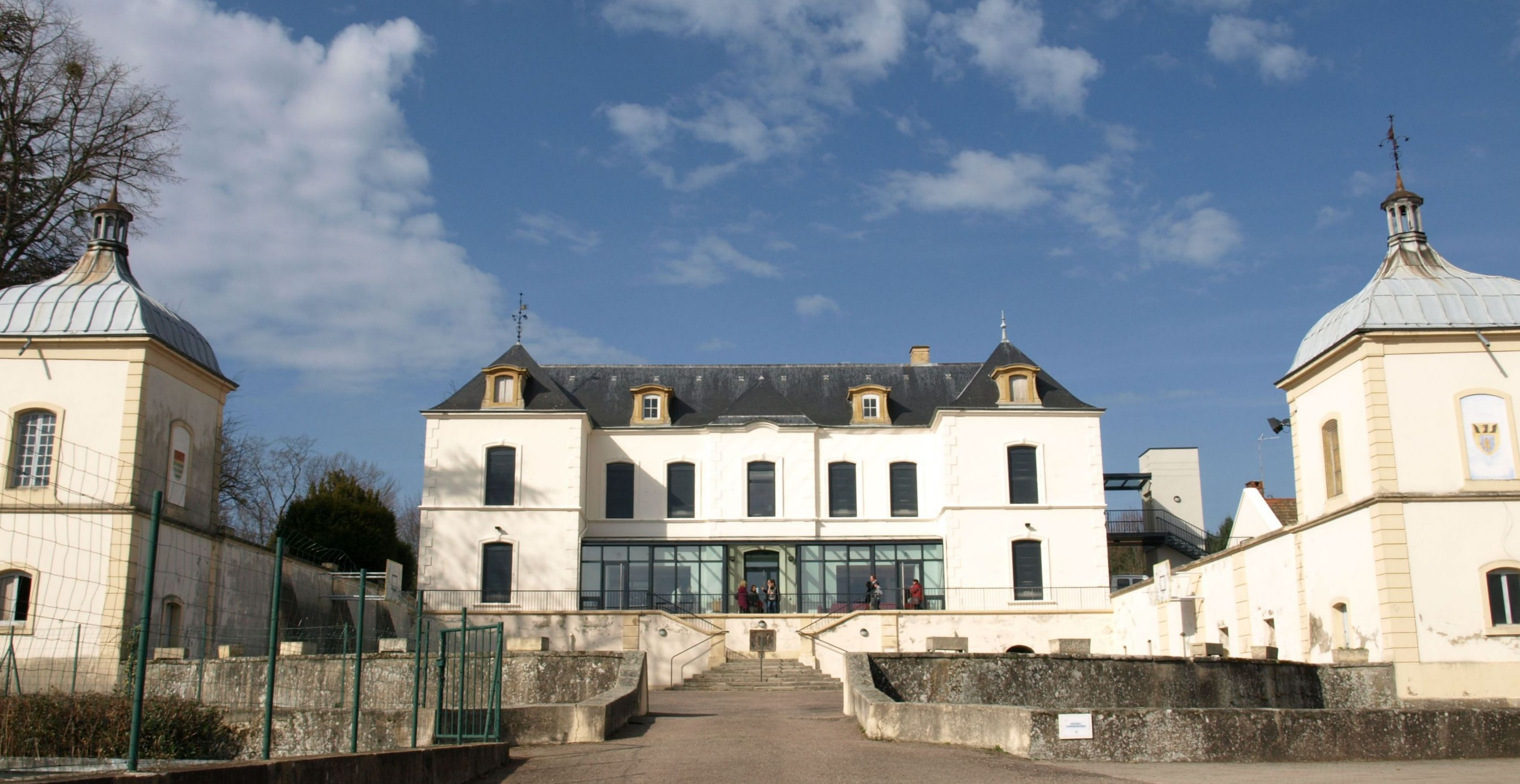
Château de Taron, Gilles Bardet, architect

== Bibliography ==
- Notes et documents sur Renaison, Abbé J. Prajoux, ISBN 2-84373-562-9
