= Champoly =

- Commune
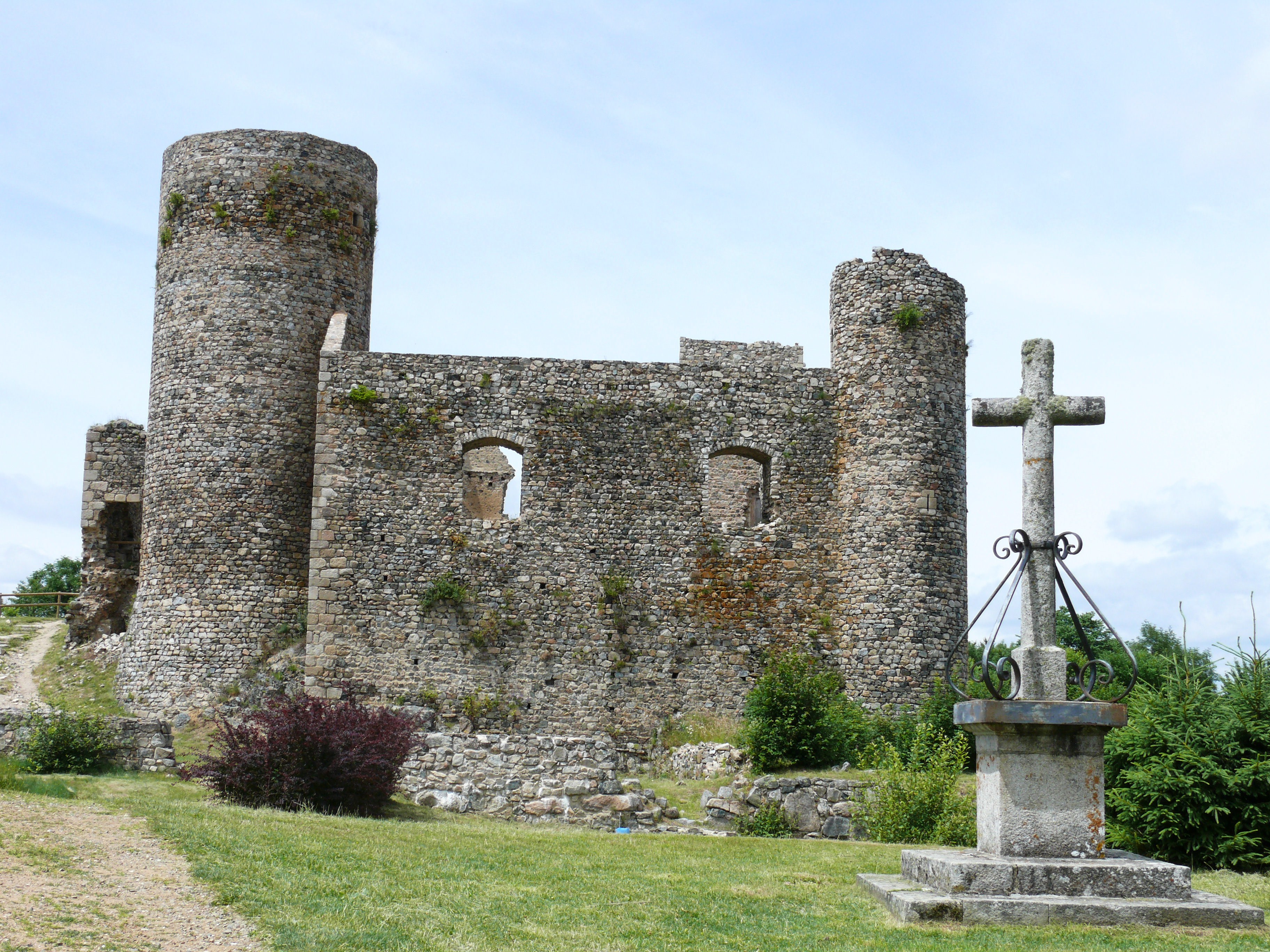
- Château
- Location of Champoly
- Location within France Location within Auvergne-Rhône-Alpes
- Coordinates: 45°51′30″N 3°50′11″E
- Country: France
- Region: Auvergne-Rhône-Alpes
- Department: Loire
- Arrondissement: Roanne
- Canton: Renaison
- Intercommunality: Pays d'Urfé

Government
  - Mayor (2020–2026): Ingrid Meunier
- Area^{1}: 14.89 km^{2} (5.75 sq mi)
- Elevation: 730 m (2,400 ft)
- Highest elevation: 952 m (3,123 ft)
- Lowest elevation: 490 m (1,610 ft)
- Population (2023): 311
  - Density: 20.9/km^{2} (54.1/sq mi)
- Time zone: UTC+01:00 (CET)
  - Summer (DST): UTC+02:00 (CEST)
- INSEE/Postal code: 42047 /42430
- ^{1} French Land Register data, which excludes lakes, ponds, glaciers > 1 km^{2} (0.386 sq mi or 247 acres) and river estuaries.

Champoly (French pronunciation: [ʃɑ̃pɔli]) is a commune in the Loire department in central France.

== Population ==
Historical population
Year	Pop.	±% p.a.
1968	437	—
1975	361	−2.69%
1982	373	+0.47%
1990	307	−2.40%
1999	260	−1.83%
2007	278	+0.84%
2012	309	+2.14%
2017	329	+1.26%
2023	311	−0.93%
Source: INSEE

== See also ==
- Communes of the Loire department
