= Saint-Jean-Saint-Maurice-sur-Loire =

- Commune
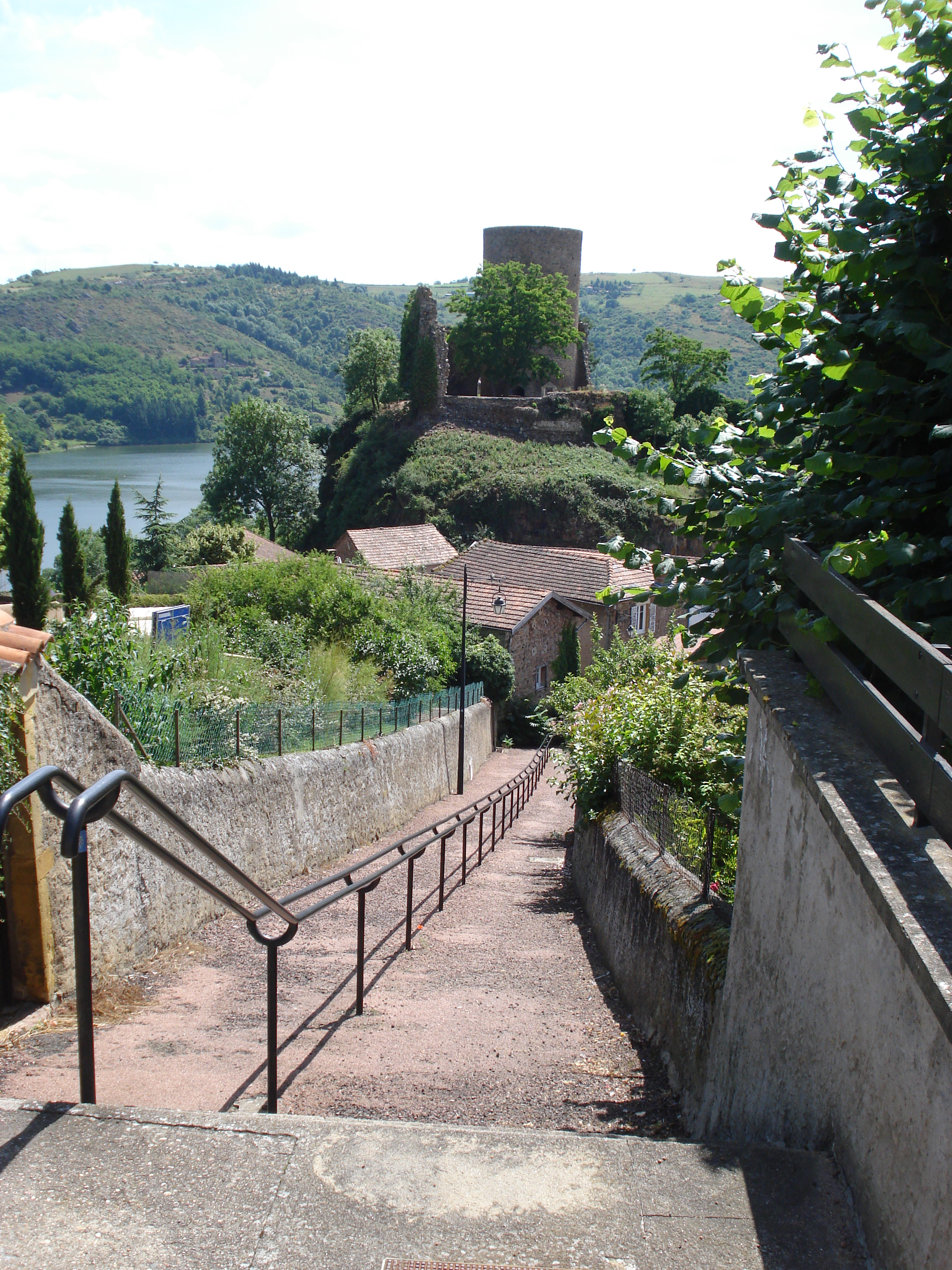

- Coat of arms
- Location of Saint-Jean-Saint-Maurice-sur-Loire
- Location within France Location within Auvergne-Rhône-Alpes
- Coordinates: 45°58′01″N 4°00′10″E
- Country: France
- Region: Auvergne-Rhône-Alpes
- Department: Loire
- Arrondissement: Roanne
- Canton: Renaison
- Intercommunality: Roannais Agglomération

Government
  - Mayor (2020–2026): Jean Smith
- Area^{1}: 23.57 km^{2} (9.10 sq mi)
- Elevation: 430 m (1,410 ft)
- Highest elevation: 803 m (2,635 ft)
- Lowest elevation: 270 m (890 ft)
- Population (2023): 1,147
  - Density: 48.66/km^{2} (126.0/sq mi)
- Time zone: UTC+01:00 (CET)
  - Summer (DST): UTC+02:00 (CEST)
- INSEE/Postal code: 42239 /42155
- ^{1} French Land Register data, which excludes lakes, ponds, glaciers > 1 km^{2} (0.386 sq mi or 247 acres) and river estuaries.

Saint-Jean-Saint-Maurice-sur-Loire is a commune in the Loire department in central France.

== Population ==
Historical population
Year	Pop.	±% p.a.
1968	771	—
1975	743	−0.53%
1982	985	+4.11%
1990	1,061	+0.93%
1999	1,022	−0.42%
2007	1,081	+0.70%
2012	1,123	+0.77%
2017	1,148	+0.44%
2023	1,147	−0.01%
Source: INSEE

== See also ==
- Communes of the Loire department
