= Saint-Romain-d'Urfé =

- Commune
- Coat of arms
- Location of Saint-Romain-d'Urfé
- Location within France Location within Auvergne-Rhône-Alpes
- Coordinates: 45°53′17″N 3°49′43″E
- Country: France
- Region: Auvergne-Rhône-Alpes
- Department: Loire
- Arrondissement: Roanne
- Canton: Renaison
- Intercommunality: Pays d'Urfé

Government
  - Mayor (2020–2026): Pascale Monat
- Area^{1}: 15 km^{2} (5.8 sq mi)
- Highest elevation: 886 m (2,907 ft)
- Lowest elevation: 593 m (1,946 ft)
- Population (2023): 243
  - Density: 16/km^{2} (42/sq mi)
- Time zone: UTC+01:00 (CET)
  - Summer (DST): UTC+02:00 (CEST)
- INSEE/Postal code: 42282 /42430
- ^{1} French Land Register data, which excludes lakes, ponds, glaciers > 1 km^{2} (0.386 sq mi or 247 acres) and river estuaries.

Saint-Romain-d'Urfé (French pronunciation: [sɛ̃ ʁɔmɛ̃ dyʁfe]) is a commune in the Loire department in central France.

== Population ==
Historical population
| Year | Pop. | ±% p.a. |
|---|---|---|
| 1968 | 461 | — |
| 1975 | 384 | −2.58% |
| 1982 | 352 | −1.24% |
| 1990 | 303 | −1.86% |
| 1999 | 270 | −1.27% |
| 2007 | 265 | −0.23% |
| 2012 | 282 | +1.25% |
| 2017 | 260 | −1.61% |
| 2023 | 243 | −1.12% |
Source: INSEE

== See also ==
- Communes of the Loire department
