= Canton of Renaison =

Coordinates: 46.05°N 3.93°E

- Canton
- Situation of the canton of Renaison in the department of Loire
- Country: France
- Region: Auvergne-Rhône-Alpes
- Department: Loire
- No. of communes: {{{nbcomm}}}
- Population (2023): 29,655
- INSEE code: 4209

The canton of Renaison is an administrative division of the Loire department, in eastern France. It was created at the French canton reorganisation which came into effect in March 2015. Its seat is in Renaison.

It consists of the following communes:

1. Ambierle
2. Arcon
3. Champoly
4. Changy
5. Chausseterre
6. Cherier
7. Cremeaux
8. Le Crozet
9. Juré
10. Lentigny
11. Noailly
12. Les Noës
13. Ouches
14. La Pacaudière
15. Pouilly-les-Nonains
16. Renaison
17. Sail-les-Bains
18. Saint-Alban-les-Eaux
19. Saint-André-d'Apchon
20. Saint-Bonnet-des-Quarts
21. Saint-Forgeux-Lespinasse
22. Saint-Germain-Lespinasse
23. Saint-Haon-le-Châtel
24. Saint-Haon-le-Vieux
25. Saint-Jean-Saint-Maurice-sur-Loire
26. Saint-Just-en-Chevalet
27. Saint-Marcel-d'Urfé
28. Saint-Martin-d'Estréaux
29. Saint-Priest-la-Prugne
30. Saint-Rirand
31. Saint-Romain-d'Urfé
32. Saint-Romain-la-Motte
33. La Tuilière
34. Urbise
35. Villemontais
36. Vivans
