= Dorfeuille =

Dorfeuille is a French surname. Notable people with the surname include:

- Antoine Dorfeuille, French actor, playwright, great traveler, and revolutionary
- Étienne Dorfeuille, French racing cyclist

== See also ==
- Pierre-Paul Gobet, called Dorfeuille, French actor and playwright
