= Brizard =

Brizard is a surname. Notable people with the surname include:

- Antoine Brizard (born 1994), French volleyball player
- Gabriel Brizard (c. 1744–1793), French writer
- Jean-Claude Brizard (born 1962), Haitian-born American educator
- Marie Brizard et Roger International, French alcoholic beverage company founded in 1755
- Marie Brizard Wine & Spirits, French wine and spirits producer and distributor founded in 1991
- Philippe Brizard (1933–2021), French actor
- Pierre Brizard (1737–1804), French furniture designer
