= Mably =

Mably may refer to:

- Gabriel Bonnot de Mably (1709–1785), French philosopher and politician
- Luke Mably (born 1976), British actor
- Mably, Loire, a commune in the Loire département in France
