= Stereo microscope =

Variant of an optical microscope

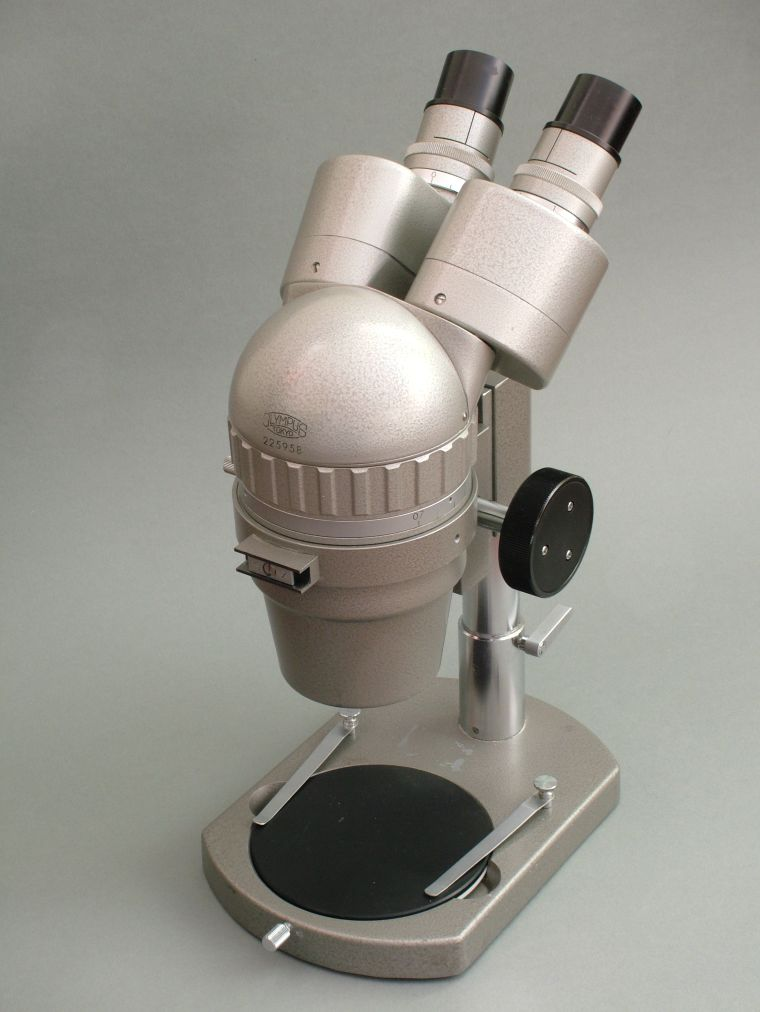
- Typical desktop zoom stereo microscope (Olympus SZ III), shown without illumination source.

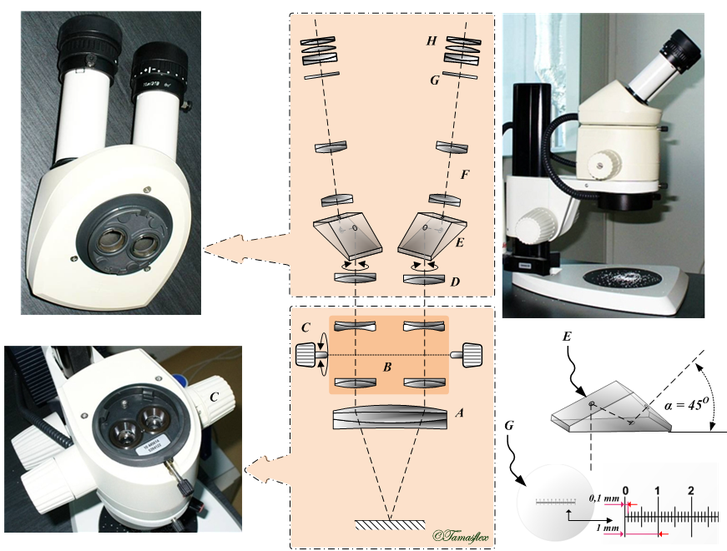
- Modern stereo microscope: 1. Objective; 2. Galilean telescopes (rotating objectives); 3. Zoom control 4. Internal objective 5. Prism; 6. Relay lens 7. Reticle; 8. Eyepiece
- Other names: Stereoscopic microscope; Dissecting microscope
- Classification: optical microscope
- Uses: manufacturing industry; inspection; quality control

The stereo, stereoscopic, operation, or dissecting microscope is an optical microscope variant designed for low magnification observation of a sample, typically using light reflected from the surface of an object rather than transmitted through it. The instrument uses two separate optical paths with two objectives and eyepieces to provide slightly different viewing angles to the left and right eyes. This arrangement produces a three-dimensional visualization for detailed examination of solid samples with complex surface topography. The typical range of magnifications and uses of stereomicroscopy overlap macrophotography.

The stereo microscope is often used to study the surfaces of solid specimens or to carry out close work such as dissection, microsurgery, watch-making, circuit board manufacture or inspection, and examination of fracture surfaces as in fractography and forensic engineering. They are thus widely used in manufacturing industry for manufacture, inspection and quality control. Stereo microscopes are essential tools in entomology.

== History ==
Although a binocular microscope with two separate optical paths had been designed and built in 1671 by Chérubin d'Orléans, the first practical stereomicroscope was designed in 1892 by American zoologist Horatio Saltonstall Greenough and became commercially available in 1896, produced by Zeiss AG in Jena, Germany. Greenough's invention built on the prism arrangement designed by Ignazio Porro to properly show relief and texture.

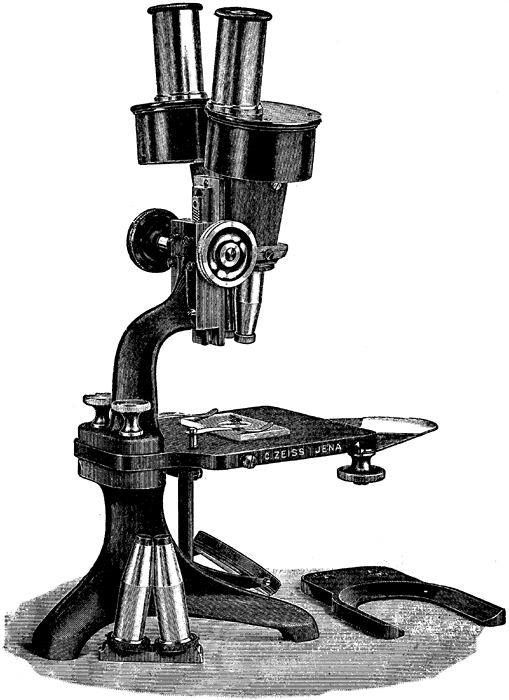
1896 Greenough Stereo Microscope by Carl Zeiss Jena

Greenough grew up in the elite of Boston, Massachusetts, the son of the famous sculptor Horatio Greenough Sr. Without the pressures of having to make a living, he instead pursued a career in science and relocated to France. At the marine observatory at Concarneau on the Bretton coast, led by the former director of the Muséum national d'histoire naturelle, Georges Pouchet, he was influenced by the new scientific ideals of the day, namely experimentation. While dissection of dead and prepared specimens had been the main concern for zoologists, anatomists and morphologists, during Greenough's stay at Concarneau interest was revived in experimenting on live and developing organisms. This way scientists could study embryonic development in action rather than as a series of petrified, two-dimensional specimens. In order to yield images that would do justice to the three-dimensionality and relative size of developing invertebrate marine embryos, a new microscope was needed. While there had been attempts to build stereomicroscopes before, by for example Chérubin d’Orleans and Pieter Harting, none had been optically sophisticated. Furthermore, up until the 1880s no scientist needed a microscope with such low resolution.

Greenough took action and, influenced by his Concarneau colleague Laurent Chabry’s attempts to construct intricate mechanisms to turn and manipulate the live embryo, conceived of his own instrument. Building on the recent discovery of binocularity as the cause of depth perception by Charles Wheatstone, Greenough designed his instrument with the phenomenon of stereopsis in mind.

== Optical design ==
The Greenough design uses two independent objective lenses focused on a single object. Most modern stereo microscopes use a binocular design with a single common main objective; the light path is parallel for each eye within the microscope body, which facilitates changing magnifications in discrete or continuous steps.

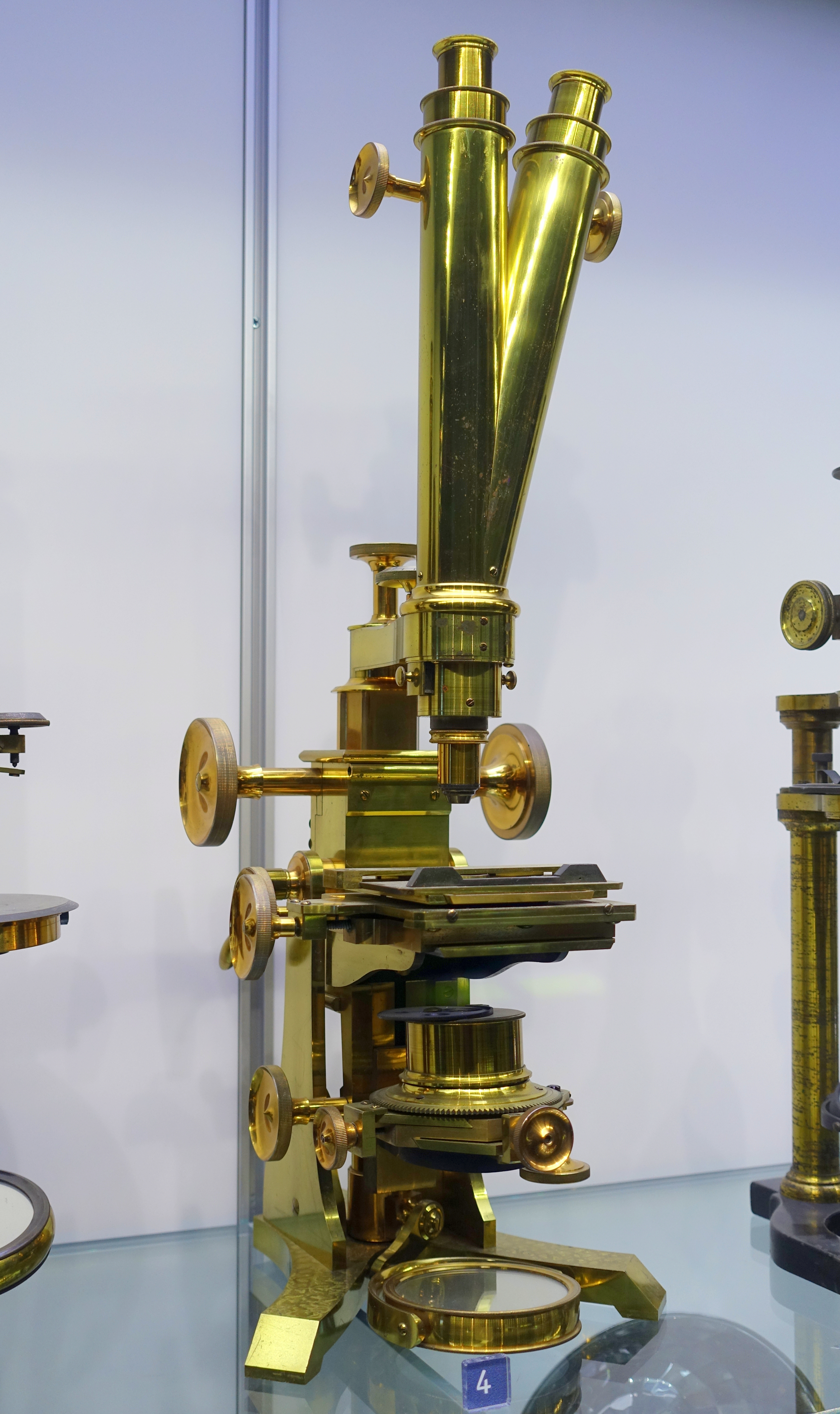
Microscope with Wenham-type binoviewer (c.1880) at the Museum of Science and Industry (Chicago)

The stereo microscope should not be confused with a compound microscope equipped with double eyepieces and a binoviewer. In such microscopes, first popularized by a design credited to Francis Herbert Wenham around 1860, the magnified image is split after the objective lens using a prism and both eyes see the same image. The binoviewer was refined using roof prisms by Jentzsch and Siedentopf in the 1910s; for these designs, the two eyepieces serve to provide greater viewing comfort. However, the image in those microscopes is no different from that obtained with a single monocular eyepiece.

=== Working distance ===
Great working distance and depth of field are important qualities for this type of microscope. Both qualities are inversely correlated with resolution: the higher the resolution (i.e. the greater the distance at which two adjacent points can be distinguished as separate), the smaller the depth of field and working distance.

The large working distance at low magnification is useful in examining large solid objects such as fracture surfaces, especially using fibre-optic illumination as discussed below. Such samples can also be manipulated easily so as to determine the points of interest. Optimal working distances range from approximately 150 to 400 mm (5.9 to 15.7 in).

=== Magnification ===
Some stereo microscopes can deliver a useful magnification up to 100×, which corresponds to the combination of a 10× objective and 10× eyepiece in a normal compound microscope; however, this is around one tenth the maximum useful resolution of a compound microscope, which range up to 500–1000×. The practical upper limit of total magnification for stereo microscopes is around 60×. In the Greenough design, the upper limit results from the need to maintain physical separation between the two objective lenses.

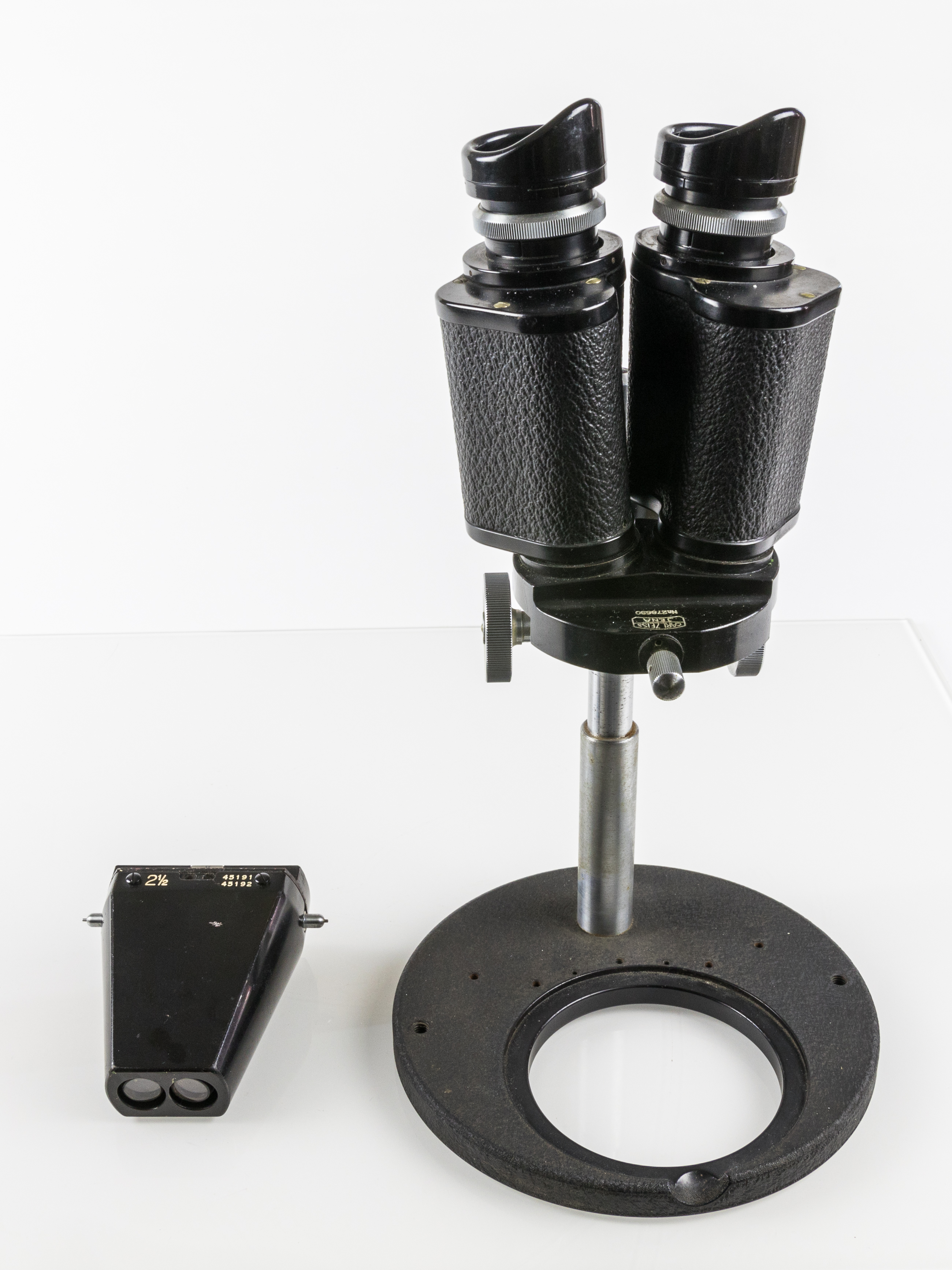
Zeiss; fixed magnification which can be adjusted by fitting new objective lenses.

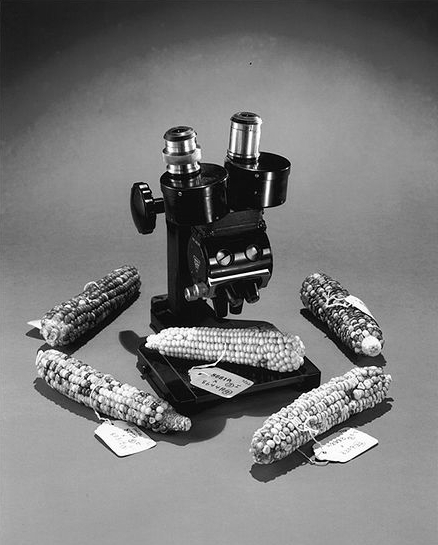
Greenough-type microscope with discrete magnifications controlled by the revolving drum

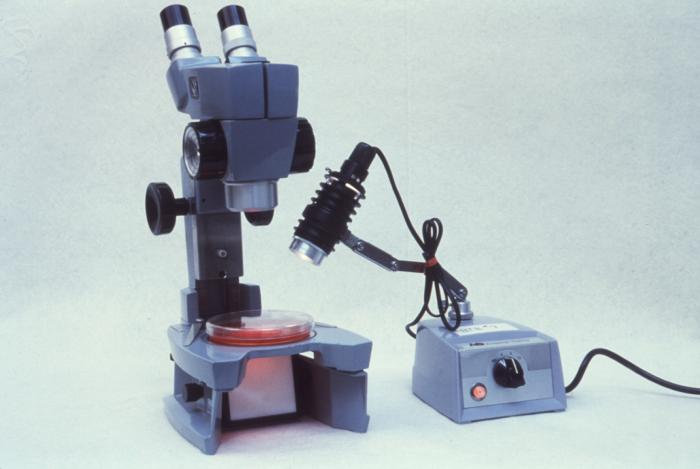
AO Spencer Cycloptic; discrete magnification steps using Galilean optics in a revolving drum

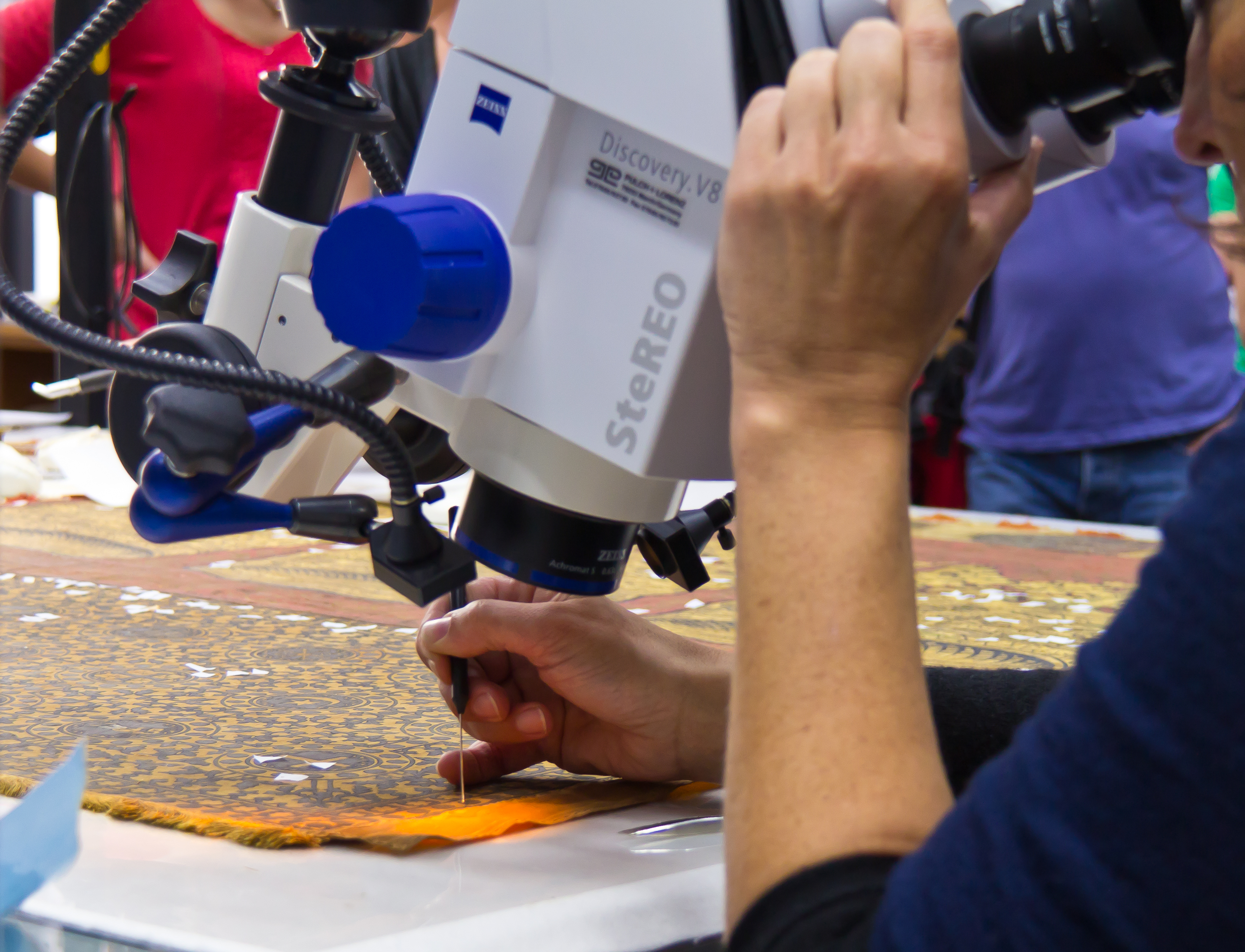
Zeiss Discovery.V8; continuously variable magnification, controlled by the large blue knob

Magnification in stereo microscopes can be either fixed or variable in discrete or continuous ranges. For fixed magnification, primary magnification is achieved by a paired set of objective lenses with a set degree of magnification.

Discrete magnification changes can be accomplished through a system attributed to Galileo as the "Galilean optical system"; here an arrangement of fixed-focus convex lenses is used to provide a fixed magnification, but with the crucial distinction that the same optical components in the same spacing will, if physically inverted, result in a different, though still fixed, magnification. This allows one set of lenses to provide two different magnifications; two sets of lenses to provide four magnifications on one drum; three sets of lenses provide six magnifications and will still fit into one drum. Practical experience shows these Galilean optics systems are as useful as a considerably more expensive zoom system, with the advantage of knowing the magnification in use as a set value without having to read analogue scales. (In remote locations, the robustness of the systems is also a non-trivial advantage.)

The other is zoom or pancratic magnification, which are capable of a continuously variable degree of magnification across a set range. Zoom systems can achieve further magnification through the use of auxiliary objectives that increase total magnification by a set factor. Also, total magnification in both fixed and zoom systems can be varied by changing eyepieces.

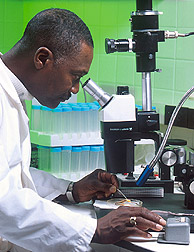
Scientist using a stereo microscope outfitted with a digital imaging camera and fibre-optic illumination

=== Illumination ===
A classical compound light microscope uses transmitted (diascopic) illumination, in which light is transmitted through the object being examined, which means the specimen is often transparent or semi-transparent. In contrast, a stereo microscope most often uses reflected or incident illumination, which is light reflected from the surface of an object. Use of reflected light from the object allows examination of specimens that would be too thick or otherwise opaque for diascopic illumination. Some stereo microscopes are also capable of transmitted light illumination as well, typically by having a bulb or mirror beneath a transparent stage underneath the object, though unlike a compound microscope, transmitted illumination is not focused through a condenser in most systems. Stereoscopes with specially equipped illuminators can be used for dark field microscopy, using either reflected or transmitted light.

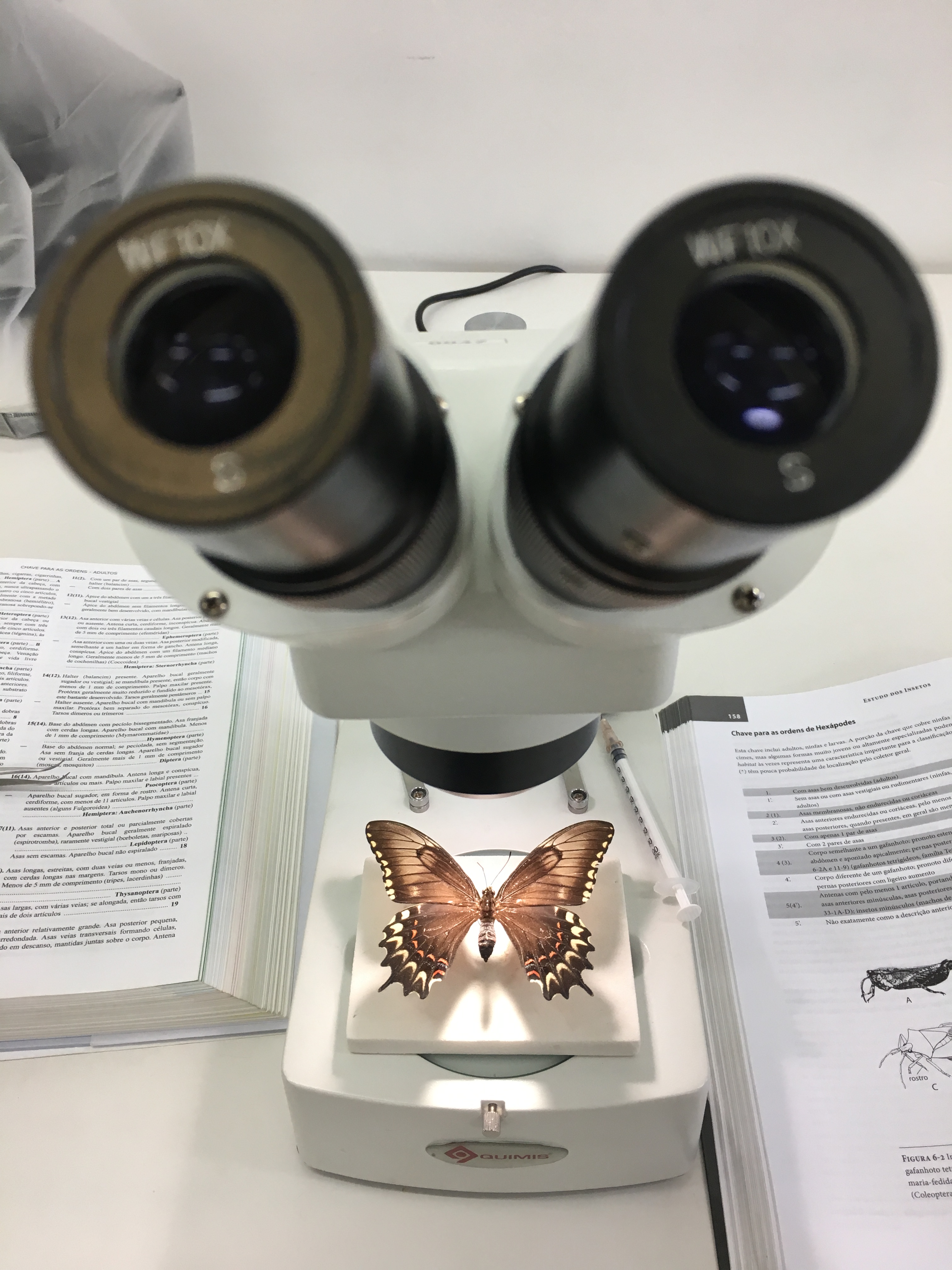
Stereomicroscope with an illuminated butterfly specimen

Small specimens necessarily require intense illumination, especially at high magnifications, and this is usually provided by a fibre-optic light source. Fiber optics utilize halogen lamps which provide high light output for a given power input. The lamps are small enough to be fitted easily near the microscope, although they often need cooling to ameliorate high temperatures from the bulb. The fibre-optic stalk gives the operator much freedom in choosing appropriate lighting conditions for the sample. The stalk is encased in a sheath that is easy to move and manipulate to any desired position. The stalk is normally unobtrusive when the lit end is near the specimen, so usually does not interfere with the image in the microscope. Examination of fracture surfaces frequently need oblique lighting so as to highlight surface features during fractography, and fibre-optic lights are ideal for this purpose. Several such light stalks can be used for the same specimen, so increasing the illumination yet further.

More recent developments in the lighting for dissecting microscopes include the use of high-power LEDs which are much more energy efficient than halogens and are able to produce a spectrum of colors of light, making them useful for fluorophore analysis of biological samples (impossible with a halogen or mercury vapor light source).

=== Digital display ===
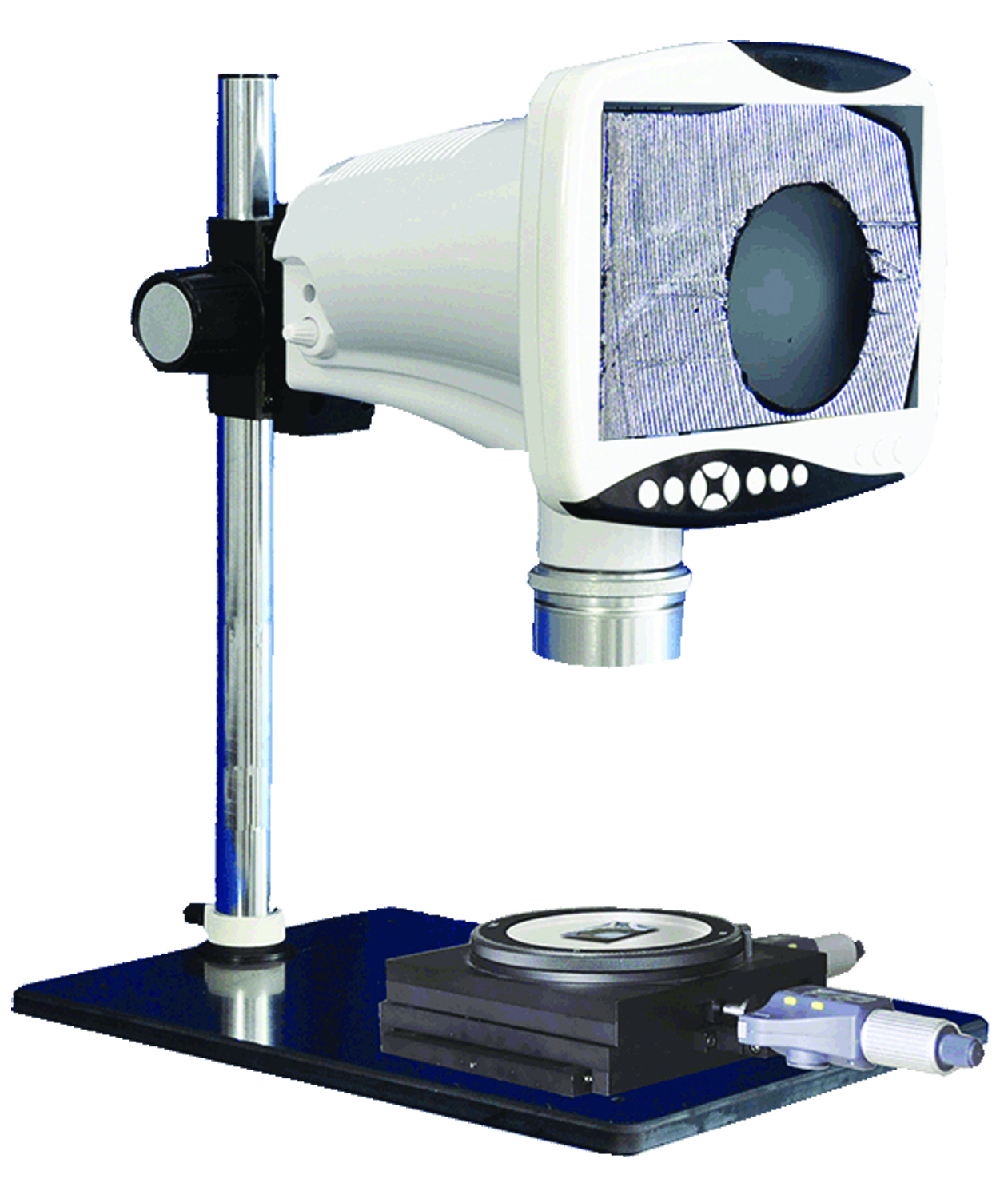
Labomed LB-343 5.0 MP digital stereo microscope with 9 inch HD LCD screen, HDMI video output, X/Y digital micrometer and moving stage

Video cameras are integrated into some stereo microscopes, allowing the magnified images to be displayed on a high resolution monitor. The large display helps to reduce the eye fatigue that would result from using a conventional microscope for extended periods.

In some units, a built-in computer converts the images from two cameras (one per eyepiece) to a 3D anaglyph image for viewing with red/cyan glasses, or to the cross converged process for clear glasses and improved color accuracy. The results are viewable by a group wearing the glasses. More typically, a 2D image is displayed from a single camera attached to one of the eyepieces.

== See also ==
- Forensic engineering
- Fractography
- Scanning electron microscopy
- Operating microscope
- Microscope
