= Charles-Jean Baptiste Bonnin =

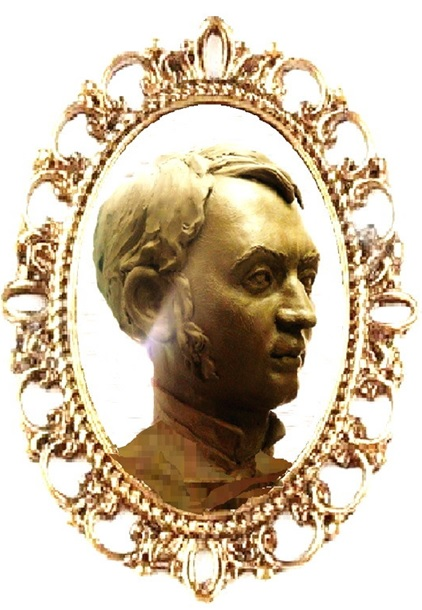
Charles-Jean Baptiste Bonnin. The work of the fine artist Arturo Ordaz.

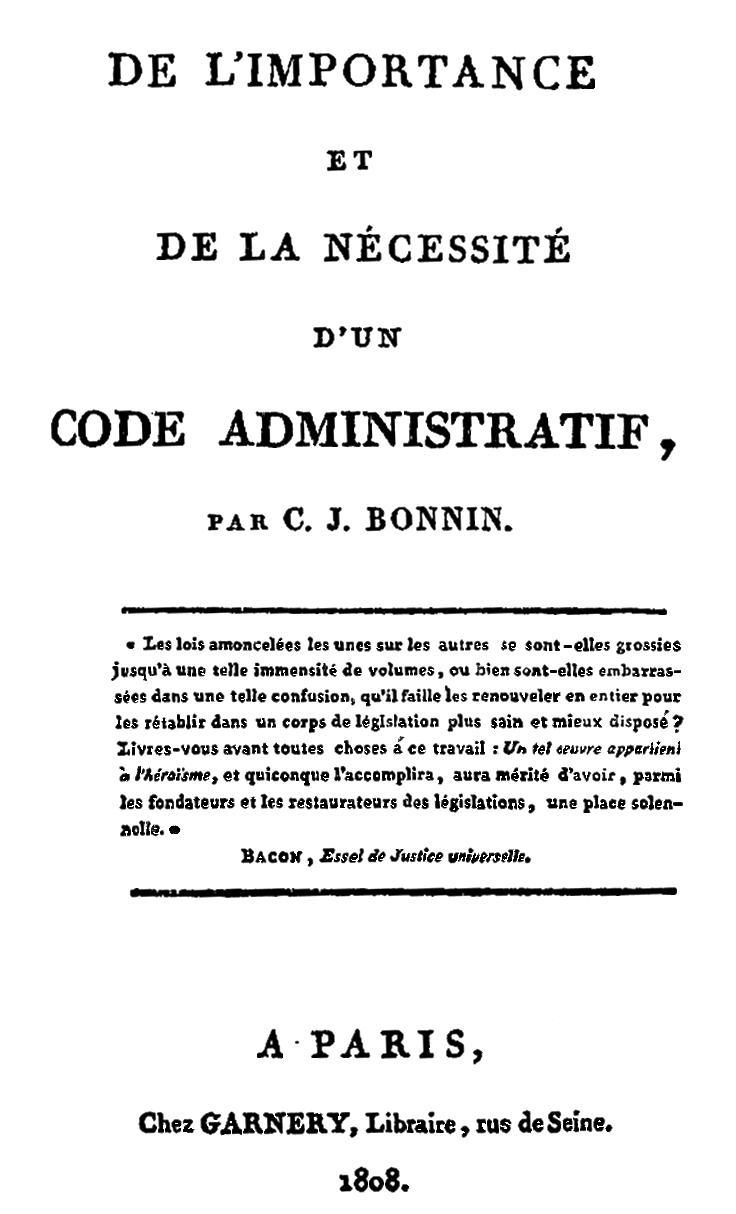
About the Importance and Need of an Administrative Code - 1808

Bonnin, Charles-Jean Baptiste (4 October 1772 in France – October 1846) Progressive French thinker, theorist, and framer of the modern discipline of Public Administration. From Bonnin's written work a great political and intellectual activity is clear. His academic works credit him as a forerunner of public, constitutional and administrative law. Actually, his 'Social Doctrine' situates him amongst the initiators of the science later known as Sociology. He also practiced parliamentary review and was interested in educational problems. Auguste Comte described Bonnin as a "mature and energetic man, a person with a spontaneous deep kinship for positivism and in whom we can find the true spirit of the Revolution".

== History ==
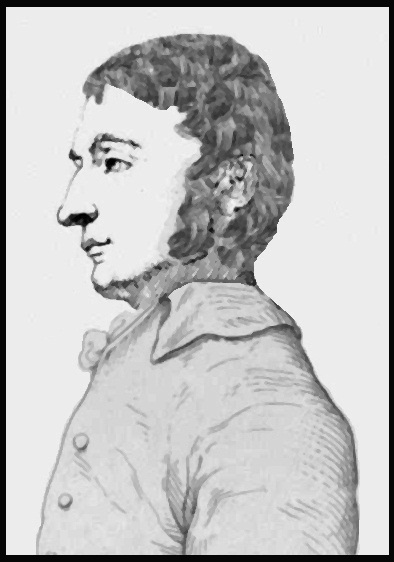
Charles-Jean Baptiste BONNIN

Bonnin was born in Paris, in a family with roots in Burgundy. He studied at the Collège des Quatre-Nations, and afterwards served the French administration as an official in the Seine department. His parents had planned for him a career as medical doctor, a project frustrated by the events of the French Revolution, a fact that inspired in Charles-Jean Bonnin a deep interest for political issues. His true vocation was born early during his youth, thanks to the works of Montesquieu, Mably, Bacon, Fénelon and Cornelius, to whom he professed great admiration. He met Auguste Comte in 1829, becoming his friend until his death.

Amongst many references to him during his lifetime, the work of M. Lemonier stands out. It is entitled Notice Historique, 'Historical Record', and heads the work named Pensées, 'Thoughts', of C.J.B. Bonnin. This document was promoted by Bonnin and, maybe, was reviewed by him also. Inside of the French administration files some references to him can be found, like his possible membership to franc-masonry. Also, by these files we know that he spent thirteenth months in prison due to certain passages of his book Études Législatives, 'Legislative Studies', where he criticized Catholicism.

The Encyclopedic Magazine or reasoned analysis of the most remarkable productions of France, edition of 1829, highlights the publication of the third edition of the Principles of Public Administration, there is an overview of the most important contents of the work and say it is a book full of wisdom and useful ideas, the author shaped with elegance, accuracy and clarity.

== Legacy ==
Today, because his main work, 'Principles of Public Administration', has been re-edited and published on-line - in the original French version and in a Spanish translation - is easier to access to it. However, this is mainly thanks to the edition produced by Mexico's Fondo de Cultura Económica in 2004. Nowadays, his countrymen are paying him the tribute he deserves. Georges Langrod rightly claimed that "the science of administration, in the modern sense of the expression, was born in France in the nineteenth century. Its pioneer was Charles-Jean Bonnin, author of 'Principles of Public Administration', whose first edition dates back to 1808. Likewise, Jacques Chevallier and Dániele Loschak have commented that "he can be considered the true founder of French administrative science." Nevertheless, Charles-Jean Bonnin is more than that, much more: he is the founder of the worldwide science of Public Administration. Most recently, Jacqueline Morand-Deviller suggested a reprint of his 'Principles', in its first edition precisely. Notwithstanding, this publication was made in the year 2004, not in France but in Mexico.

== Written work ==
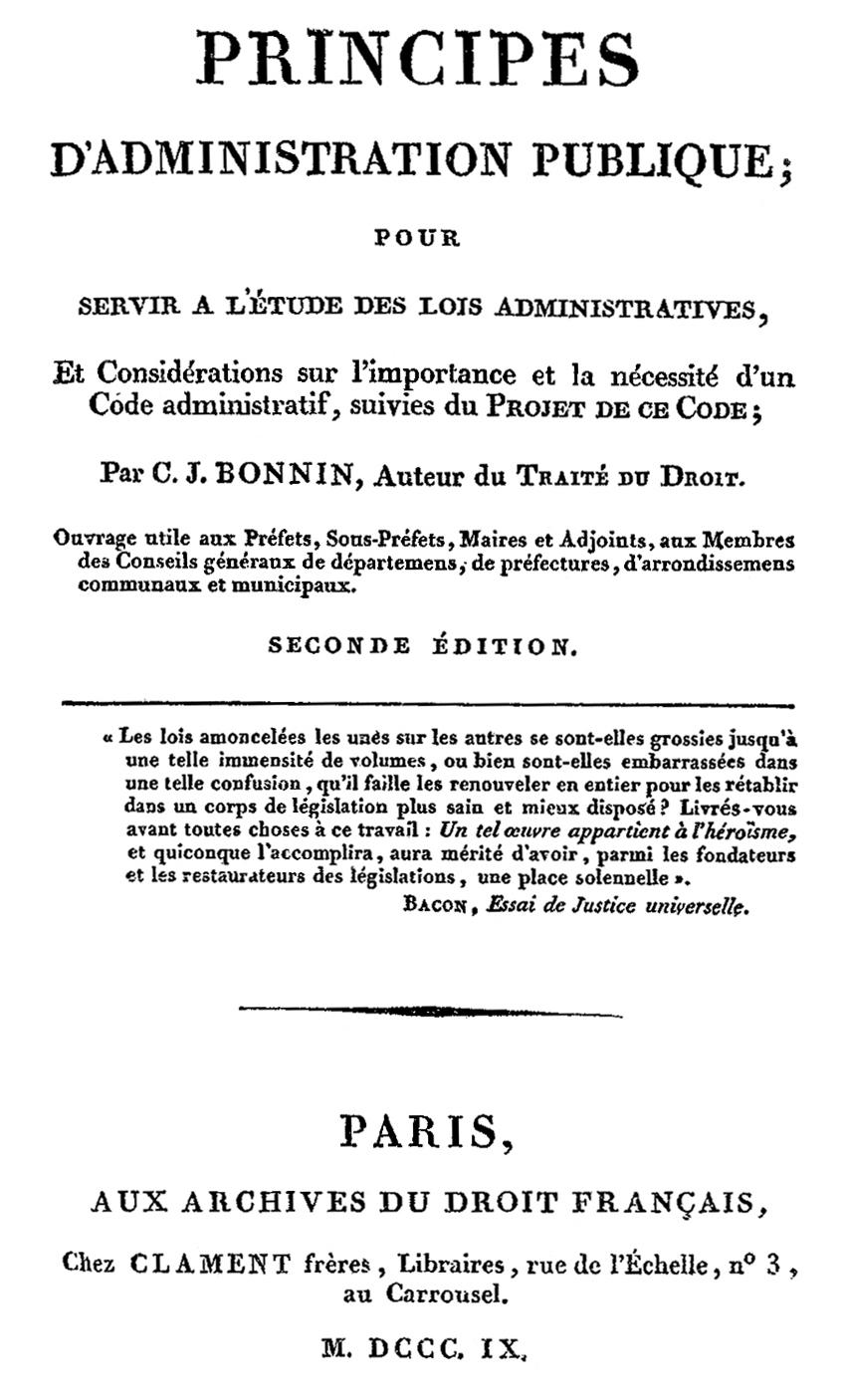
Public Administration Principles - 1809

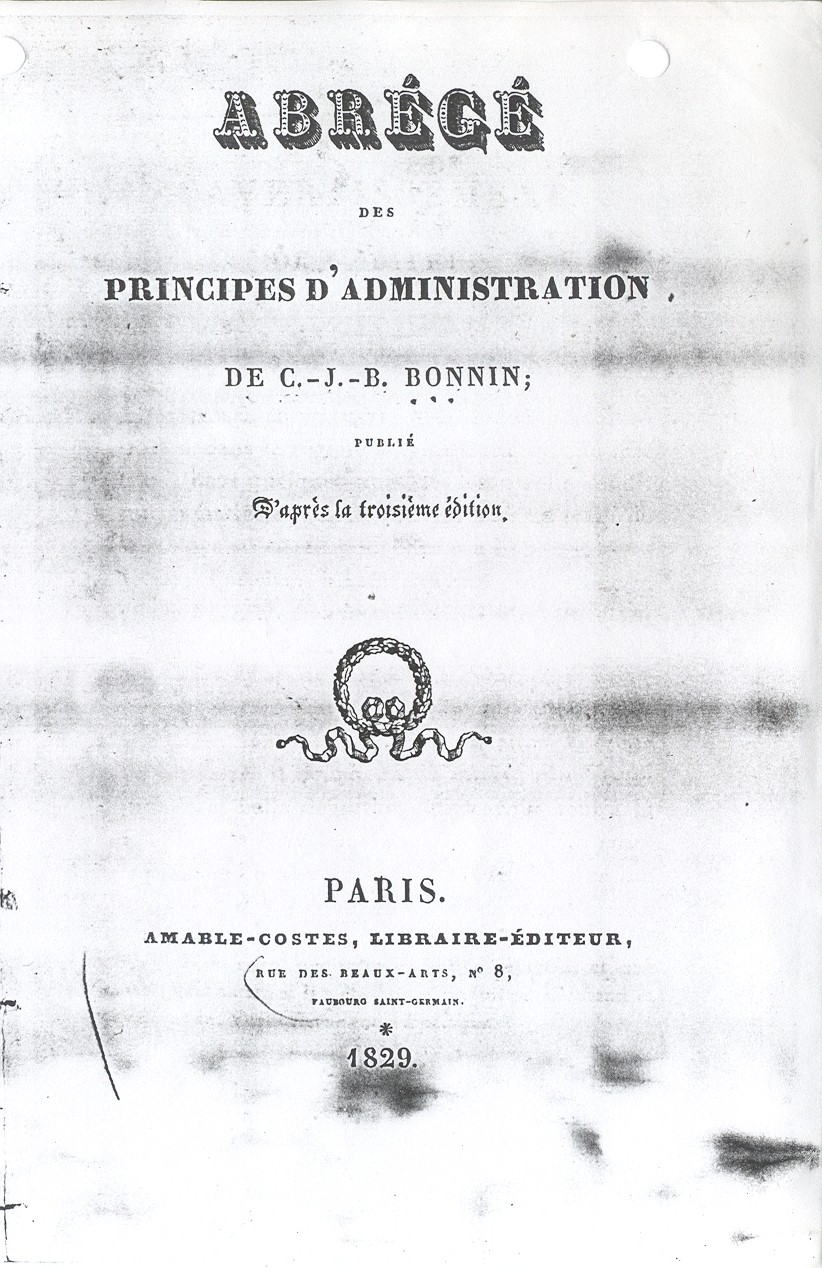
Compendium of Administration Principles - 1829

Chronological account of his writings, beginning with his magnum opus, 'Principes d'Administration Publique' (Principles of Public Administration):

- De l’Importance et de la Nécessité d’un Code Administratif. A Paris, chez Garnery, Libraire. 1808.
- Principes d'Administration Publique, por servir a l'Études des Lois Administratives, et Considérations sur l'Importance et la Nécessité d'un Code Administratif, suvies du Project de ce Code. Obvrage utile aux Préfets, Sous-Préfets, Maires et Adjounts, aux Membres des Conseils généraux de départaments, de préfectures, d'arrondissemenns, communaux et municipaux. A Paris, chez Clement Frères, Libraires. 1809. Seconde édition.
- Principes d'Administration Publique. A Paris, chez Renaudiere Imprimeur-Libraire. 1812. Troisième édition.
- Abrégé des Principes d’Administration. D́aprés la troisième edition. Paris, Amable-Costes, Libraire-Éditeur. 1829.
- Extracto dos Principios Fundamentaes do Sistema Administrativo de Franca por M. Bonnin, e sua Comparacao con os de Portugal. Francisco Soares Franco, Deputado ás Cortes Ordinarias. Lisboa, na Typografia Rollandiana. 1822.
- Principii di Amministrazione Pubblica. Napoli, Nella Stamperia Francese. 1824. Versión italiana de Antonio di Crescenzi y Michele Saffioti.
- Compendio de los Principios de Administración. Madrid, Imprenta de don José Palacios. Versión castellana de D.J.M. Saavedra. 1834.
- Compendio de los Principios de Administración. Madrid, Imprenta de don José Palacios. Versión castellana de D.J.M. Saavedra. 1834 (Facsimile accessible of Internet edition produced by Nabu Public Domain Reprints, LaVergne, TN USA, 2011).
- Ciencia Administrativa: Principios de Administración Pública. Estractados de la obra francesa de Carlos Juan Bonnin. Panamá, Imprenta de José Ángel Santos. 1838. Traducida por Esteban Febres Cordero.
- "Principios de la Administración Pública". México, Revista de Administración Pública. Número Especial. Noviembre de 1982. pp. 81–102.
- Bonnin, C.J.B. "Principios de la Administración Pública". México, Revista de Administración Pública. Antología 1-54. Febrero de 1983. pp. 479–500.
- Principios de Administración Pública. México, Fondo de Cultura Económica. 2004.

Works on other subjects:

- De l'Excellence de Corneille (About the Excellence of Corneille). 1791.
- Reflexions sur Montesquieu (Reflexions on Montesquieu). This and the previous work were published later, in 1795.
- Réfutation des Systemes des Publicistes ou Examen des Causas de la Sociabilité et du Droit Naturel (Refutation of Systems for Advertisers and Review of Sociability and Natural Law). 1796.
- De l'Ordre et de la Culture des Connaissances (About the Order and the Culture of Knowledge). 1802.
- Maniére d'Étudier les Lois (The Way of Studying Laws). 1805.
- Droit Public Français (French Public Law). 1809.
- De la Révolution Europée (About the European Revolution). 1815.
- Elémens Naturals de la Chronologie (Natural Elements of Chronology). 1820.
- Legislation Constitutionnelle (Constitutional Legislation). 1820.
- Session de 1819 (1819 Session). 1820.
- Doctrine Social (Social Doctrine). 1820.
- Études Législatives (Legislative Studies). 1921.
- Pensée de C.J.B. Bonnin, Suivies des Éliges de Corneille et Montesquieu (Thought of C.J.B. Bonnin, followed by the Tribute to Corneille and Montesquieu). 1824.
- "Letres sur Education" ("Letters on Education"), written to her daughter Charlotte Victoire when he was in prison. 1824.
- "A Madame Bonnin": Poesies et Lettres de C.J.B. Bonnin ("To Madame Bonnin": poetry and correspondence from C.J.B. Bonnin). 1834.
- "Refutation de l'Avenier, salón Lammenaires et Chautebriand" ("Rebuttal of the Future, according to Lammenaires and Chautebriand"). 1834.
- La Religion sous le Raport Philosophique et Politique (The Religion under the Philosophical and Political relation). 1822.
