= Loire's 5th constituency =

Constituency of the National Assembly of France

5th constituency of Loire
- inline Constituency of the National Assembly of France

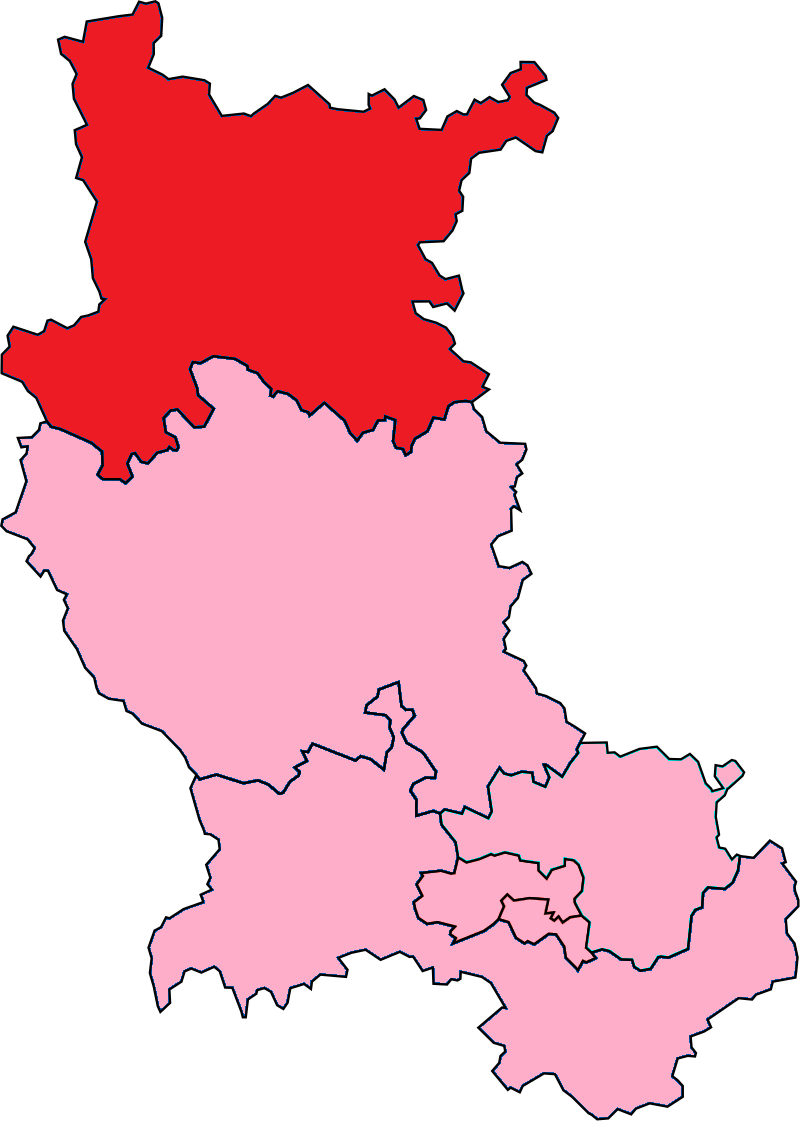
- Loire's's 5th Constituency shown within Loire

- Location of Loire in France
- Deputy: Antoine Vermorel-Marques; LR
- Department: Loire
- Cantons: Belmont-de-la-Loire, Charlieu, La Pacaudière, Perreux, Roanne Nord, Roanne Sud, Saint-Haon-le-Châtel, Saint-Just-en-Chevalet, Saint-Symphorien-de-Lay
- Registered voters: 101144

The 5th constituency of the Loire (French: Cinquième circonscription de la Loire) is a French legislative constituency in the Loire département. Like the other 576 French constituencies, it elects one MP using a two round electoral system.

== Description ==
The 5th constituency of the Loire covers the northernmost parts of the department around the town of Roanne.

Politically the seat has tended to support the centre right with the exceptions of 1988 and 2017.

== Assembly Members ==
Election	Member	Party
1988	Jean Auroux	PS
1993	Yves Nicolin	UDF
1997	Yves Nicolin	DL
2002	Yves Nicolin	UMP
2007	Yves Nicolin	UMP
2012	Yves Nicolin	UMP
2017	Nathalie Sarles	MoDem
2022	Antoine Vermorel-Marques	LR
2024	Antoine Vermorel-Marques	LR

== Election results ==
=== 2024 ===
Candidate	Party	Alliance	First round			Second round		
Candidate	Party	Alliance	Votes	%	+/–	Votes	%	+/–
Antoine Vermorel-Marques	LR	UDC	29,832	41.99	+16.22	36,613	51.11	-10.61
Sandrine Granger	RN		25,644	36.09	+17.06	26,893	37.54	new
Ismaël Stevenson	LFI	NFP	13,039	18.35	-2.00	8,130	11.35	new
Florence Nayme	ECO		956	1.35	new			
Edith Roche	LO		726	1.02	+0.01			
Robert Lachaud	REC		614	0.86	-3.21			
Yann Esteveny	EXD		239	0.34	-0.16			
Votes			71,050	100.00		71,636	100.00	
Valid votes			71,050	97.68	-0.15	71,636	97.84	+9.44
Blank votes			1,187	1.63	+0.04	1,132	1.55	-6.98
Null votes			497	0.68	+0.09	446	0.61	-2.46
Turnout			72,734	71.60	+21.06	73,214	72.06	+28.03
Abstentions			28,855	28.40	-21.06	28,393	27.94	-28.03
Registered voters			101,589			101,607		
Result			LR HOLD					

=== 2022 ===
Legislative Election 2022: Loire's 5th constituency
Party	Candidate	Votes	%	±%
LR (UDC)	Antoine Vermorel-Marques	13,031	25.77	+0.99
LREM (Ensemble)	Nathalie Sarles	11,842	23.41	-10.70
LFI (NUPÉS)	Ismaël Stevenson	10,292	20.35	−0.26
RN	Sandrine Granger	9,623	19.03	+3.75
REC	Raphaël Pessoa	2,058	4.07	N/A
PRG	Marilyne Emorine	1,094	2.16	+2.41
Others	N/A	2,636	-	−
Turnout		50,576	50.54	+0.40
2nd round result
LR (UDC)	Antoine Vermorel-Marques	24,575	61.72	+14.85
LREM (Ensemble)	Nathalie Sarles	15,245	38.28	−14.85
Turnout		39,820	44.03	−0.29
LR gain from MoDem		Swing	+14.85	

=== 2017 ===
Candidate	Label	First round		Second round	
Candidate	Label	Votes	%	Votes	%
Nathalie Sarles	MoDem	16,880	34.11	21,257	53.13
Clotilde Robin	LR	12,265	24.78	18,751	46.87
Sarah Brosset	FN	7,563	15.28		
Véronique Rakose-Truchet	FI	4,982	10.07		
Brigitte Dumoulin	PS	2,443	4.94		
Alain Valentin	ECO	1,632	3.30		
Jean-Luc Villemagne	PCF	1,140	2.30		
Colette Roussel	DIV	765	1.55		
Karine Maurice	DLF	622	1.26		
Céline Thomas	EXD	548	1.11		
Édith Roche	EXG	391	0.79		
Brice Fiquemo	DIV	261	0.53		
Votes		49,492	100.00	40,008	100.00
Valid votes		49,492	97.58	40,008	89.25
Blank votes		850	1.68	3,487	7.78
Null votes		376	0.74	1,331	2.97
Turnout		50,718	50.14	44,826	44.32
Abstentions		50,426	49.86	56,318	55.68
Registered voters		101,144		101,144	
Source: Ministry of the Interior

=== 2012 ===
2012 legislative election in Loire's 5th constituency
Candidate	Party	First round		Second round	
Candidate	Party	Votes	%	Votes	%
Yves Nicolin	UMP	25,645	41.85%	33,487	56.35%
Laure Deroche	PS	19,803	32.32%	25,936	43.65%
Michèle Agrafeil	FN	8,270	13.50%		
Jean-Paul Loire	FG	3,616	5.90%		
Serge Alibert	EELV	1,771	2.89%		
Jean-François Vial	AC	1,030	1.68%		
Gérard Dumas	POI	698	1.14%		
Edith Roche	LO	334	0.55%		
Yonnel Levy	PP	111	0.18%		
Pascale Chretien	DLR	0	0.00%		
Valid votes		61,278	98.49%	59,423	96.54%
Spoilt and null votes		940	1.51%	2,130	3.46%
Votes cast / turnout		62,218	61.37%	61,553	59.54%
Abstentions		39,171	38.63%	41,833	40.46%
Registered voters		101,389	100.00%	103,386	100.00%

=== 2007 ===
Legislative Election 2007: Loire's 5th constituency
Party	Candidate	Votes	%	±%
UMP	Yves Nicolin	19,329	46.45	
PS	Laure Deroche	13,227	31.78	
MoDem	Michel Boufferet	2,836	6.82	
FN	Séverine Brun	1,857	4.46	
PCF	Suzy Viboud	989	2.38	
Others	N/A	3,376	-	−
Turnout		42,308	61.07	
2nd round result
UMP	Yves Nicolin	21,324	50.67	
PS	Laure Deroche	20,761	49.33	
Turnout		43,135	62.27	
UMP hold				

=== 2002 ===
Legislative Election 2002: Loire's 5th constituency
Party	Candidate	Votes	%	±%
UMP	Yves Nicolin	19,827	45.83	
PS	Bernard Jayol	14,408	33.31	
FN	Jean-Claude Suchel	3,956	9.14	
PCF	Suzy Viboud	1,131	2.61	
Others	N/A	3,938	-	−
Turnout		44,041	64.34	
2nd round result
UMP	Yves Nicolin	22,097	54.91	
PS	Bernard Jayol	18,144	45.09	
Turnout		41,407	60.49	
UMP gain from PR				

=== 1997 ===
Legislative Election 1997: Loire's 5th constituency
Party	Candidate	Votes	%	±%
PR (UDF)	Yves Nicolin	14,100	32.92	
PS	Jean Auroux	12,308	28.73	
FN	Norbert Chetail	6,508	15.19	
PCF	Serge Fonton	3,915	9.14	
LV	Bruno Barriquand	1,568	3.66	
GE	Daniel Durand	1,393	3.25	
LO	Jean-Louis Guglielmetto	1,336	3.12	
LDI	Marianne Peguet	1,183	2.76	
MRC	Nicolas Laurenceau	524	1.22	
Turnout		45,255	67.00	
2nd round result
PR (UDF)	Yves Nicolin	23,522	51.94	
PS	Jean Auroux	21,762	48.06	
Turnout		48,537	71.86	
PR hold				
