= Nathalie Sarles =

French politician (born 1962)

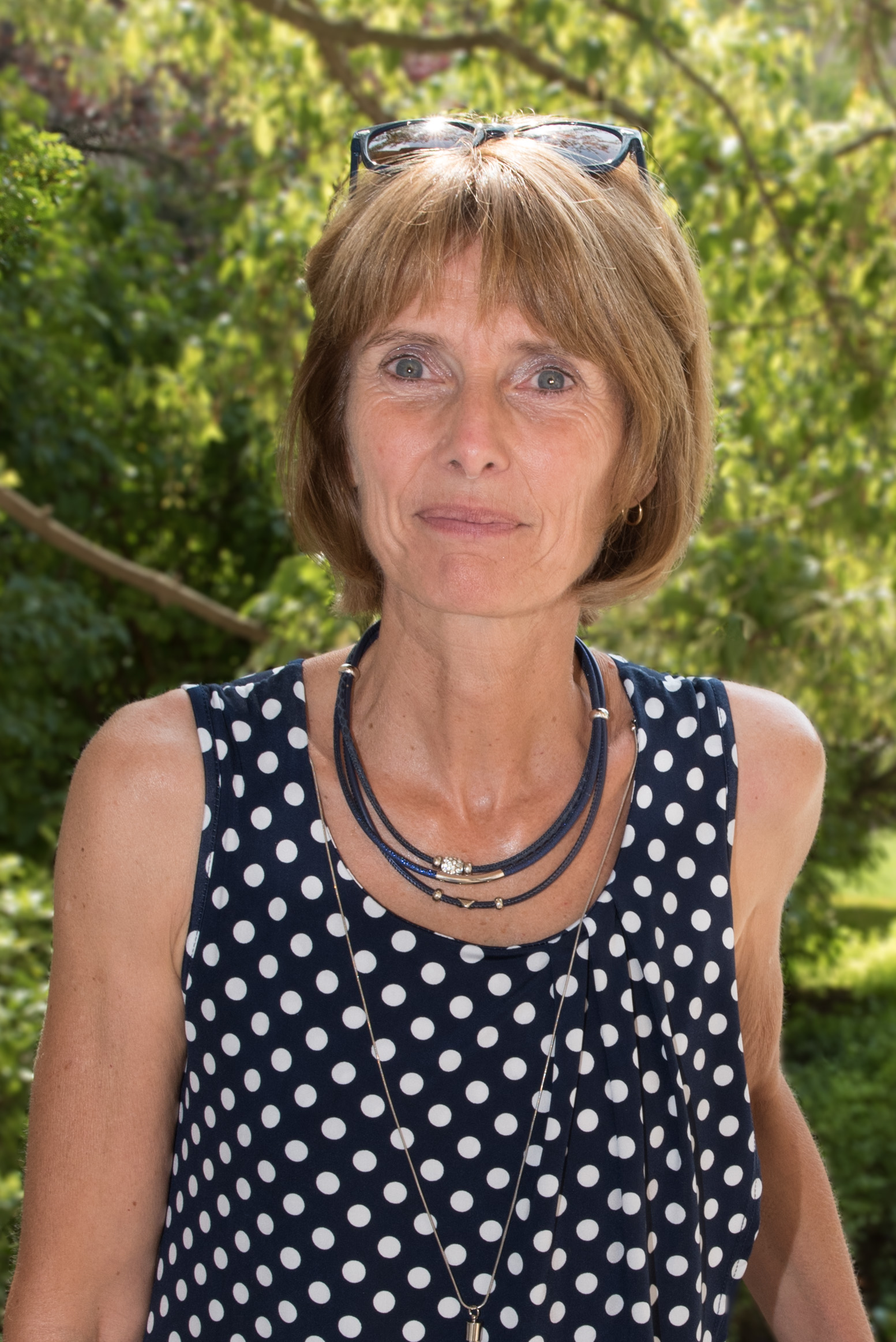
- Nathalie Sarles

Deputy for Loire's 5th constituency in the National Assembly of France
- In office 21 June 2017 – 21 June 2022
- Preceded by: Yves Nicolin
- Succeeded by: Antoine Vermorel-Marques
- Parliamentary group: LREM

Personal details
- Born: April 17, 1962 (age 63) Valence, Drôme, France

Nathalie Sarles (French pronunciation: [natali saʁl]; born 17 April 1962) is a French nurse and politician of the Democratic Movement (MoDem) who served as a member of the National Assembly from 2017 to 2022., representing the 5th constituency of the department of Loire.

== Political career ==
Sarles was previously a nurse before becoming a councillor for Villerest commune.

In parliament, Sarles served on the Sustainable Development, Spatial and Regional Planning Committee.

She lost her seat in the second round of the 2022 French legislative election to Antoine Vermorel-Marques.

== Political positions ==
In 2020, Sarles went against the LREM parliamentary group's majority and abstained from an important vote on a much discussed security bill drafted by her colleagues Alice Thourot and Jean-Michel Fauvergue that helps, among other measures, curtail the filming of police forces.
