= Laurent Chabry =

French biologist

Laurent Chabry (1855-1894) was a French biologist.

Chabry was born in 1855 in the small city of Roanne, Loire, and died on November 23, 1894, in the city of Riorges. He obtained a PhD of medicine in 1881 and a PhD of science in 1887. He was then director of the laboratory of Concarneau, and finished his career in Lyon as assistant professor in the Faculty of Science.

He mainly worked in the flying mechanisms of birds and insects, and demonstrated the mechanism of "double equilibrium" in Coleoptera. He also worked on tuberculosis and embryology.
