= Yves Nicolin =

French politician

Deputy for Loire's 5th constituency in the National Assembly of France
- In office 1993–2017
- Preceded by: Jean Auroux
- Succeeded by: Nathalie Sarles

Mayor of Roanne
- Incumbent
- Assumed office 5 April 2014
- Preceded by: Laure Déroche
- In office 19 March 2001 – 16 March 2008
- Preceded by: Jean Auroux
- Succeeded by: Laure Déroche

Personal details
- Born: 5 March 1963 (age 63) Le Coteau, Loire

Yves Nicolin (French pronunciation: [iv nikɔlɛ̃]; born 5 March 1963) is the Mayor of Roanne. He was a member of the National Assembly of France, representing the Loire's 5th constituency from 1993 to 2017 as a member of UDF, UMP and then the Republicans.
