= Saint-Léger-sur-Roanne =

- Commune
- Location of Saint-Léger-sur-Roanne
- Location within France Location within Auvergne-Rhône-Alpes
- Coordinates: 46°02′27″N 3°59′52″E
- Country: France
- Region: Auvergne-Rhône-Alpes
- Department: Loire
- Arrondissement: Roanne
- Canton: Roanne-2
- Intercommunality: Roannais Agglomération

Government
  - Mayor (2020–2026): Marie-Christine Bravo
- Area^{1}: 4.51 km^{2} (1.74 sq mi)
- Elevation: 320 m (1,050 ft)
- Highest elevation: 339 m (1,112 ft)
- Lowest elevation: 296 m (971 ft)
- Population (2023): 1,170
  - Density: 259/km^{2} (672/sq mi)
- Time zone: UTC+01:00 (CET)
  - Summer (DST): UTC+02:00 (CEST)
- INSEE/Postal code: 42253 /42155
- ^{1} French Land Register data, which excludes lakes, ponds, glaciers > 1 km^{2} (0.386 sq mi or 247 acres) and river estuaries.

Saint-Léger-sur-Roanne (French pronunciation: [sɛ̃ leʒe syʁ ʁɔan], lit. 'Saint Léger on Roanne') is a commune in the Loire department in central France.

A football team called les Belettes (The Weasels) was created in the village in 2020. In April 2021 the village was the site of a large explosion after gas-cylinders were exposed to fire.

== Population ==
Historical population
Year	Pop.	±% p.a.
1968	578	—
1975	712	+3.02%
1982	859	+2.72%
1990	947	+1.23%
1999	943	−0.05%
2007	1,070	+1.59%
2012	1,145	+1.36%
2017	1,145	+0.00%
2023	1,170	+0.36%
Source: INSEE

== See also ==
- Communes of the Loire department
