= Hôtel de Ville, Roanne =

Town hall in Roanne, France

Hôtel de Ville
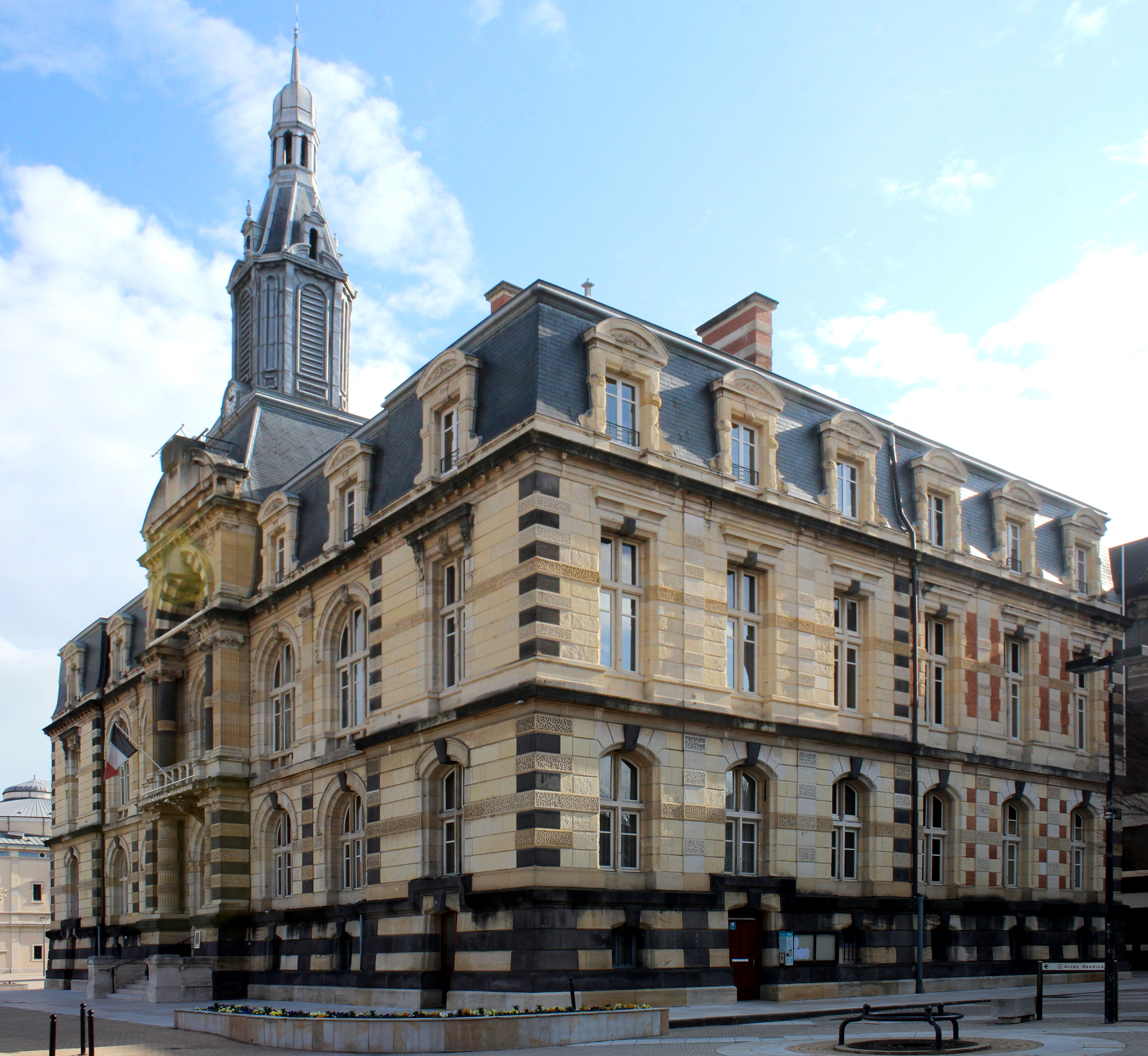
- The main frontage of the Hôtel de Ville in February 2018
- Interactive map of the Hôtel de Ville area

General information
- Type: City hall
- Architectural style: Neoclassical style
- Location: Roanne, France
- Coordinates: 46.0344°N 4.0727°E
- Completed: 1874

Design and construction
- Architect: Édouard Corroyer

The Hôtel de Ville (French pronunciation: [otɛl də vil], City Hall) is a municipal building in Roanne, Loire, in central France, standing on Place de l'Hôtel de Ville.

== History ==
Following the French Revolution, the new town council established its offices in the Couvent des Capucins (Convent of the Capuchins). The convent had been commissioned by Order of the Capuchins during a period of expansion across Europe in the early 17th century and it was erected between 1632 and 1637. It was laid out as three blocks around a courtyard. In 1791, the convent was seized by the state and the friars driven out: it was then acquired by the council for municipal use. A local archaeologist, Fleury Mulsant, established a museum in the convent in November 1844.

In 1860, the Minister of the Interior, Jean Gilbert Victor Fialin, duc de Persigny, who had been born in the Loire department, became concerned about the dilapidated state of the convent and encouraged the council to demolish it and to erect a dedicated town hall on the site. The town council led by the mayor, Charles Boullier, duly resolved to commission such a building. The foundation stone, which contained a sealed bottle preserving the relevant minutes of the meeting of the council, was laid on 27 May 1865. Work on the building was temporarily paused during the Franco-Prussian War of 1870. It was designed by Édouard Corroyer in the neoclassical style, built in stone of different colours and was completed in 1874. The black stone was quarried in Volvic, the light yellow stone came from Chevroches, the bright yellow stone was brought from Aprement and the ochre stone was mined in Saint-Maurice.

The design involved a symmetrical main frontage of seven bays facing onto Place de l'Hôtel de Ville with the end bays slightly projected forward as pavilions. The central bay, which was also slightly projected forward, featured a round headed doorway with voussoirs and a keystone, flanked by Doric order columns. On the first floor, there was a round headed window with voussoirs, a keystone and a balustraded balcony, flanked by Ionic order columns and, at attic level, there was a large arch with an oculus in the centre. Above the arch, there was a modillioned cornice and a segmental pediment and, behind that, there was an octagonal belfry. The other bays were fenestrated with round headed windows on the first two floors and with dormer windows at attic level. The bays on the ground floor were flanked by Doric order pilasters and the bays on the first floor were flanked by Ionic order pilasters. Internally, the principal room was a large reception room (now known as the Salle de Charles de Gaulle), which also served as the council chamber.

A fountain, designed by the sculptor, Charles Louis Picaud, which was intended to commemorate the award of the Legion of Honour to the town for its resistance against Austrian forces during the campaign in north-east France during the Napoleonic Wars, was unveiled in front of the town hall in 1914. During the liberation of the town on 21 August 1944, part of the Second World War, the French Forces of the Interior seized the town hall and flew the French tricolour from the flagpole. The museum relocated to the former home of the archaeologist, Joseph Déchelette, after the death of his widow, Jane, in 1957.
