= Antoine Vermorel-Marques =

French politician (born 1993)

Member of the National Assembly for Loire's 5th constituency
- Incumbent
- Assumed office 22 June 2022
- Preceded by: Nathalie Sarles

Personal details
- Born: 17 February 1993 (age 33) Roanne, France
- Party: The Republicans (2020–present)
- Other political affiliations: Union of the Right and Centre
- Education: Sciences Po

Antoine Vermorel-Marques (French pronunciation: [ɑ̃twan vɛʁmɔʁɛl maʁk]; born 17 February 1993) is a French politician who has represented the 5th constituency of the Loire department in the National Assembly since 2022. A member of The Republicans (LR), he has also held a seat in the Departmental Council of Loire for the canton of Renaison since 2021.

== Political career ==
Vermorel-Marques was a municipal councillor in Renaison from 2020 to 2022.

=== Member of the National Assembly, 2022–present ===
In parliament, Vermorel-Marques has been serving on the Committee on Sustainable Development, Spatial and Regional Planning.

In addition to his committee assignments, Vermorel-Marques is part of the parliamentary friendship groups with India, Portugal, Switzerland and Togo.

Ahead of the Republicans’ 2022 convention, Vermorel-Marques endorsed Bruno Retailleau as the party’s chairman; however, Éric Ciotti won the vote. In 2023, Ciotti appointed him as member of his shadow cabinet and put him in charge of environmental policy.
