= Villerest =

- Commune
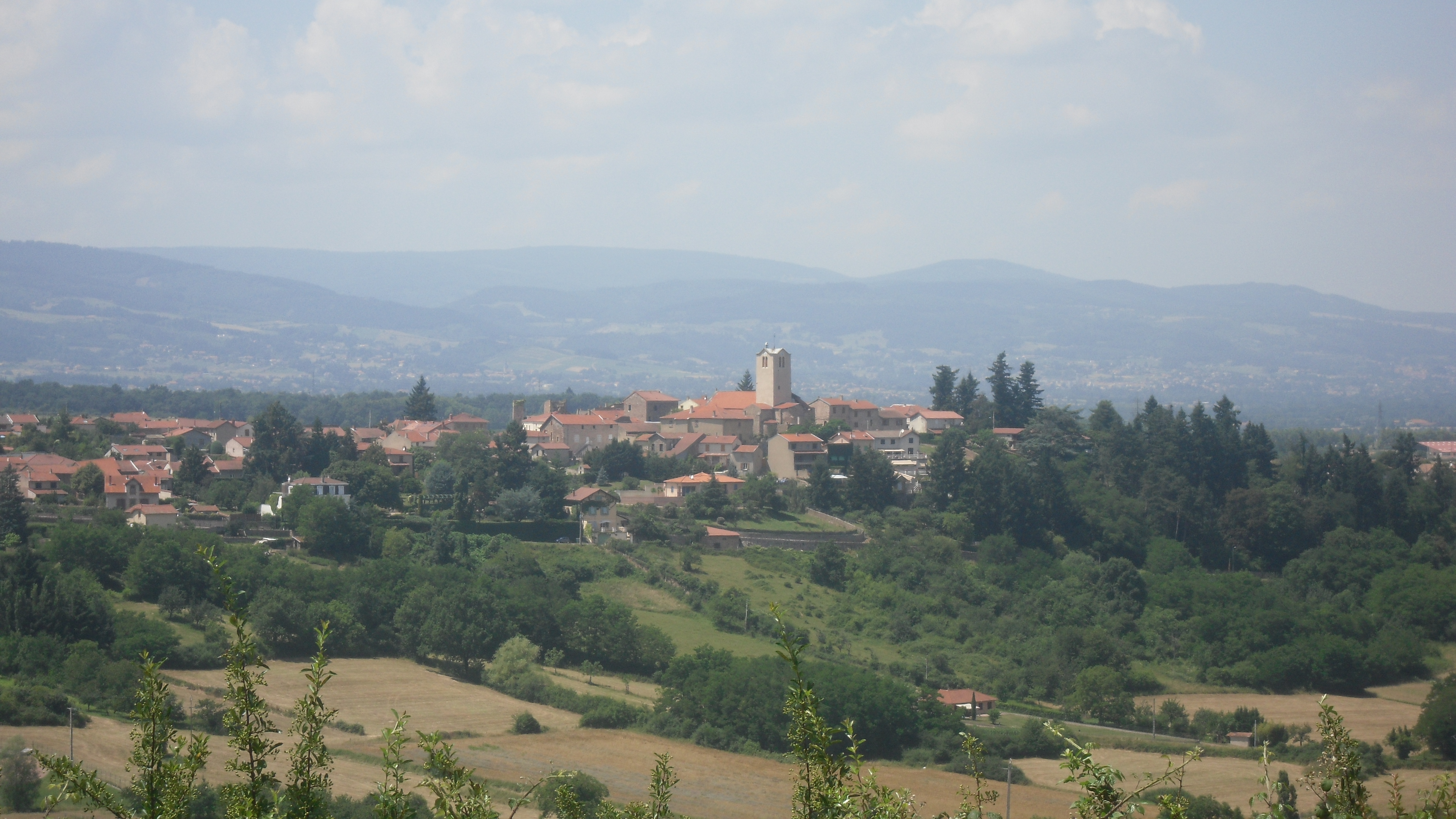

- Coat of arms
- Location of Villerest
- Location within France Location within Auvergne-Rhône-Alpes
- Coordinates: 45°59′39″N 4°02′14″E
- Country: France
- Region: Auvergne-Rhône-Alpes
- Department: Loire
- Arrondissement: Roanne
- Canton: Roanne-2
- Intercommunality: Roannais Agglomération

Government
  - Mayor (2020–2026): Philippe Perron
- Area^{1}: 14.82 km^{2} (5.72 sq mi)
- Elevation: 360 m (1,180 ft)
- Highest elevation: 426 m (1,398 ft)
- Lowest elevation: 261 m (856 ft)
- Population (2023): 5,172
  - Density: 349.0/km^{2} (903.9/sq mi)
- Time zone: UTC+01:00 (CET)
  - Summer (DST): UTC+02:00 (CEST)
- INSEE/Postal code: 42332 /42300
- ^{1} French Land Register data, which excludes lakes, ponds, glaciers > 1 km^{2} (0.386 sq mi or 247 acres) and river estuaries.

Villerest (French pronunciation: [vilʁɛ]; Arpitan: Vilarês) is a commune in the Loire department in central France. It is a Medieval-era commune located just south of the city of Roanne. The village is bordered by the river Loire.

== Population ==
Historical population

Year	Pop.	±% p.a.
1793	950	—
1800	435	−10.56%
1806	546	+3.86%
1821	587	+0.48%
1831	964	+5.09%
1836	1,030	+1.33%
1841	976	−1.07%
1846	1,006	+0.61%
1851	1,031	+0.49%
1856	1,130	+1.85%
1861	1,211	+1.39%
1866	1,208	−0.05%
1872	1,207	−0.01%
1876	1,227	+0.41%
1881	1,230	+0.05%
1886	1,281	+0.82%
1891	1,270	−0.17%
1896	1,218	−0.83%
1901	1,204	−0.23%

Year	Pop.	±% p.a.
1906	1,201	−0.05%
1911	1,149	−0.88%
1921	976	−1.62%
1926	1,034	+1.16%
1931	1,127	+1.74%
1936	1,076	−0.92%
1946	1,039	−0.35%
1954	1,286	+2.70%
1962	1,524	+2.15%
1968	1,743	+2.26%
1975	2,239	+3.64%
1982	2,928	+3.91%
1990	4,104	+4.31%
1999	4,243	+0.37%
2007	4,414	+0.50%
2012	4,696	+1.25%
2017	4,902	+0.86%
2023	5,172	+0.90%

Source: EHESS and INSEE (1968-2023)

== Sights ==
- Le Barrage de Villerest, a hydroelectric dam that also prevents flooding along the Loire. This dam also creates a reservoir, the Lac de Villerest.
- The village itself contains many buildings from the Middle Ages. These include numerous houses, and the Eglise de Saint-Priest. Maybe most famous from this time period are the ramparts that are still mostly intact today.

== International relations ==
Villerest is twinned with:

- Piatra Neamţ, Romania and Storrington, West Sussex, England.

== See also ==
- Communes of the Loire department
