= Étoges =

- Commune
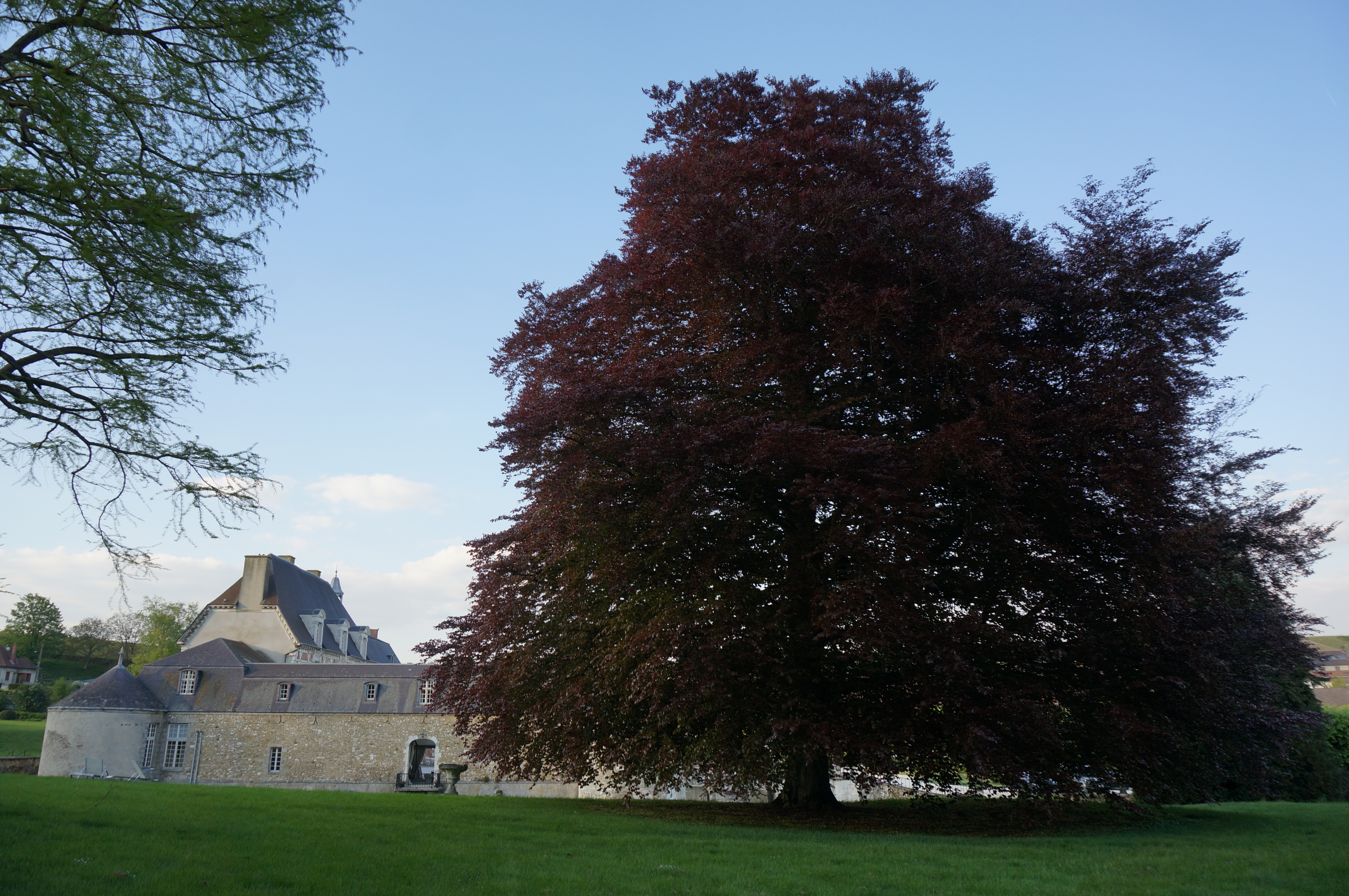
- The chateau in Étoges
- Location of Étoges
- Location within France Location within Grand Est
- Coordinates: 48°52′50″N 3°51′22″E
- Country: France
- Region: Grand Est
- Department: Marne
- Arrondissement: Épernay
- Canton: Dormans-Paysages de Champagne
- Intercommunality: Paysages de la Champagne

Government
  - Mayor (2020–2026): Yann Thomas
- Area^{1}: 14.57 km^{2} (5.63 sq mi)
- Elevation: 185 m (607 ft)
- Population (2023): 415
  - Density: 28.5/km^{2} (73.8/sq mi)
- Time zone: UTC+01:00 (CET)
  - Summer (DST): UTC+02:00 (CEST)
- INSEE/Postal code: 51238 /51270
- ^{1} French Land Register data, which excludes lakes, ponds, glaciers > 1 km^{2} (0.386 sq mi or 247 acres) and river estuaries.

Étoges (French pronunciation: [etɔʒ]) is a commune in the Marne department in north-eastern France. The 18th-century actor, playwright and revolutionary Antoine Dorfeuille (1754–1795) was born in Étoges.

== See also ==
- Communes of the Marne department
