= Canton of Roanne-2 =

Coordinates: 46.03°N 4.06°E

- Canton
- Situation of the canton of Roanne-2 in the department of Loire
- Country: France
- Region: Auvergne-Rhône-Alpes
- Department: Loire
- No. of communes: {{{nbcomm}}}
- Population (2023): 30,524
- INSEE code: 4212

The canton of Roanne-2 is an administrative division of the Loire department, in eastern France. It was created at the French canton reorganisation which came into effect in March 2015. Its seat is in Roanne.

It consists of the following communes:

1. Riorges
2. Roanne (partly)
3. Saint-Léger-sur-Roanne
4. Villerest
