= Gabriel Brizard =

Gabriel Brizard (ca. 1744 – 23 January 1793) often known as Abbé Brizard, and sometimes by the pen-name Gallophile (lover of France), was a writer and historian whose work was popular and respected in the 18th century. He was a lawyer at the Parliament of Paris. (Parlement de Paris)

He supported many of the reforms of the French Revolution and admired Voltaire and his anti-clerical views. Brizard was also an admirer of Rousseau and Mably. His Éloge historique de l'abbé de Mably (eulogy/obituary) published after Mably's death won him a prize from the Académie des inscriptions et belles lettres in 1787.
