= Pierre Brizard =

French furniture designer

- Born: 1737
- Died: 1804; Paris, France
- Occupation: Furniture designer

Pierre Brizard (1737–1804) was a French furniture designer.
