= Gabriel Bonnot de Mably =

French philosopher, historian, and writer (1709–1785)

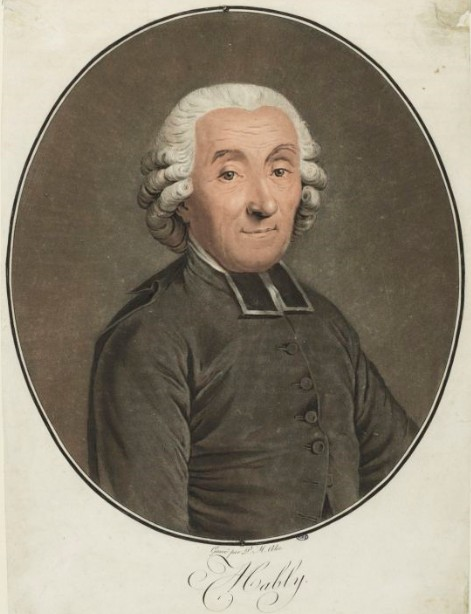
- Gabriel Bonnot de Mably, Musée de la Révolution française.
- Born: 14 March 1709
- Died: 2 April 1785 (aged 76)

Gabriel Bonnot de Mably (14 March 1709 in Grenoble – 2 April 1785 in Paris), sometimes known as Abbé de Mably, was a French philosopher, historian, and writer, who for a short time served in the diplomatic corps. He was a popular 18th-century writer.

== Biography ==
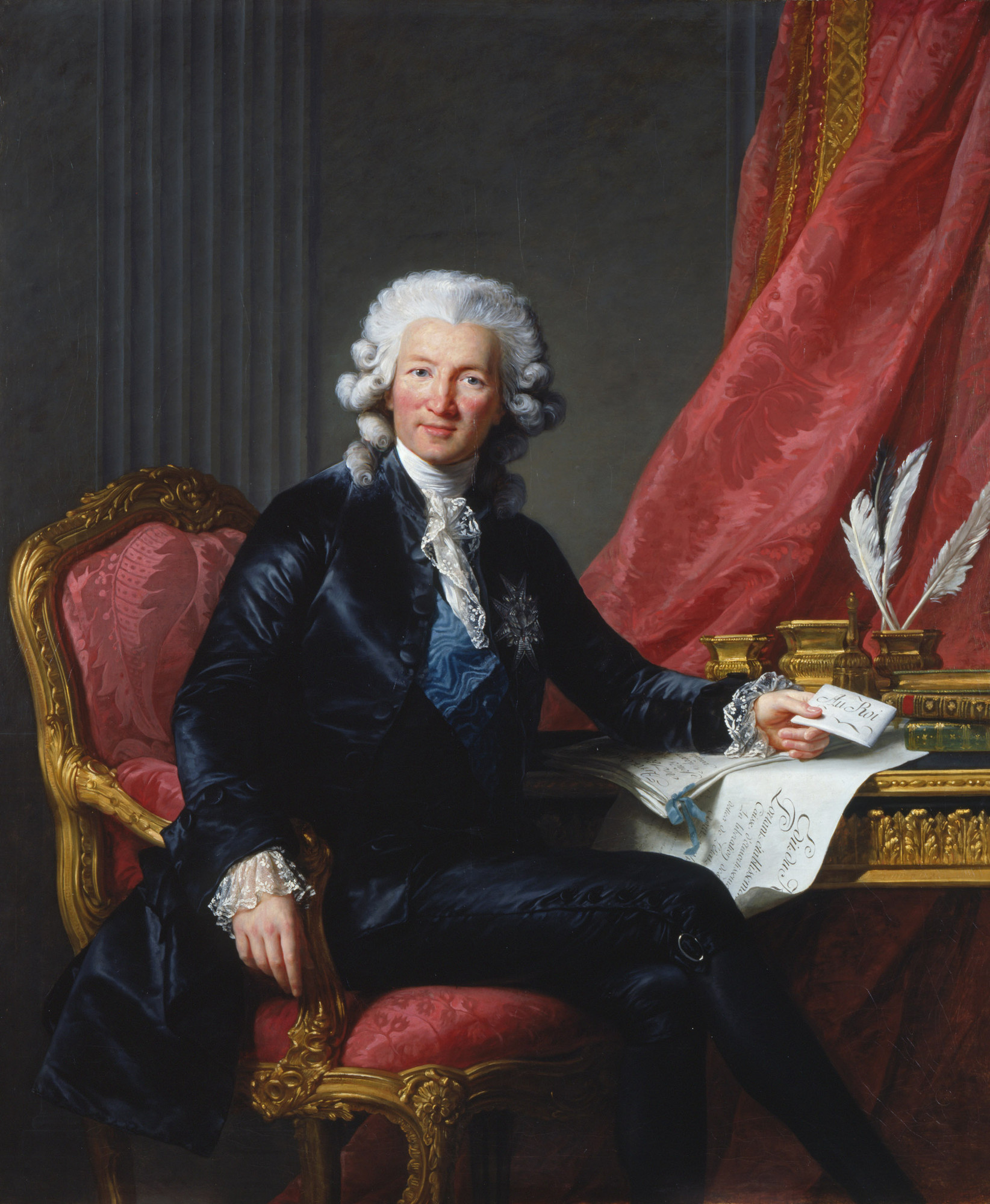
An official dressed as a Noblesse de robe; Gabriel Bonnet came from this class

Gabriel Bonnot was born at Mably, Loire into a family that belonged to the Noblesse de robe or Nobles of the Robe. This class formed the Second Estate whose rank derived from holding judicial or administrative posts and were often hard-working professionals, unlike the aristocratic Noblesse d'épée or Nobles of the Sword. He and his older brother Jean added "de Mably" to their names; his younger brother Étienne used another family property, at Condillac, Drôme. As 'Condillac', he also became a noted writer and philosopher.

Gabriel and his brothers were educated in an institution run by the Society of Jesus or Jesuits; he enrolled in a seminary at Saint-Sulpice. In 1742, he became a confidant of Cardinal Tencin, then Minister of State without Portfolio, for whom he carried out various diplomatic roles during the 1740 to 1748 War of the Austrian Succession. They included negotiating an alliance with Prussia in 1743 and preparing terms for the 1746 Congress of Breda, which sought to agree a separate peace with Britain. However, he fell out with Cardinal Tencin and thereafter focused on scholarly pursuits.

Based on the recommendation of Françoise-Louise de Warens, in April 1740, Mably's older brother Jean employed the 28-year-old Jean-Jacques Rousseau as tutor for his two oldest sons. Rousseau produced two short works addressed to Jean de Mably: "Memorandum Presented to Monsieur de Mably on the Education of Monsieur His Son" and the shorter "Plan for the Education of Monsieur de Sainte-Marie". These outline a proposed system of education for Jean de Mably's sons and also present one of his earliest public self-reflections and self-justifications. By summer 1741, Rousseau realized he was ill-suited to the position and the two agreed to end his employment, parting on friendly terms.

The historian Leo Damrosch explains that at this time, Abbé de Mably

had just published a treatise comparing Roman institutions of government with French ones and celebrating the progress of civilization ... Conversing with Mably, Condillac, [and friends he had met at Lyon's reading club] Parisot, Bordes, and their friends, Rousseau found himself in a stimulating intellectual milieu, and the studies he had put himself through in Chambéry suddenly came to life.

Rousseau would remain lifelong friends with Mably and his family. Both Mably and his brother Condillac visited Rousseau when he moved to Montmorency, Val-d'Oise. Rousseau later reflected upon his experience tutoring Jean de Mably's sons in The Confessions.

== Influence ==
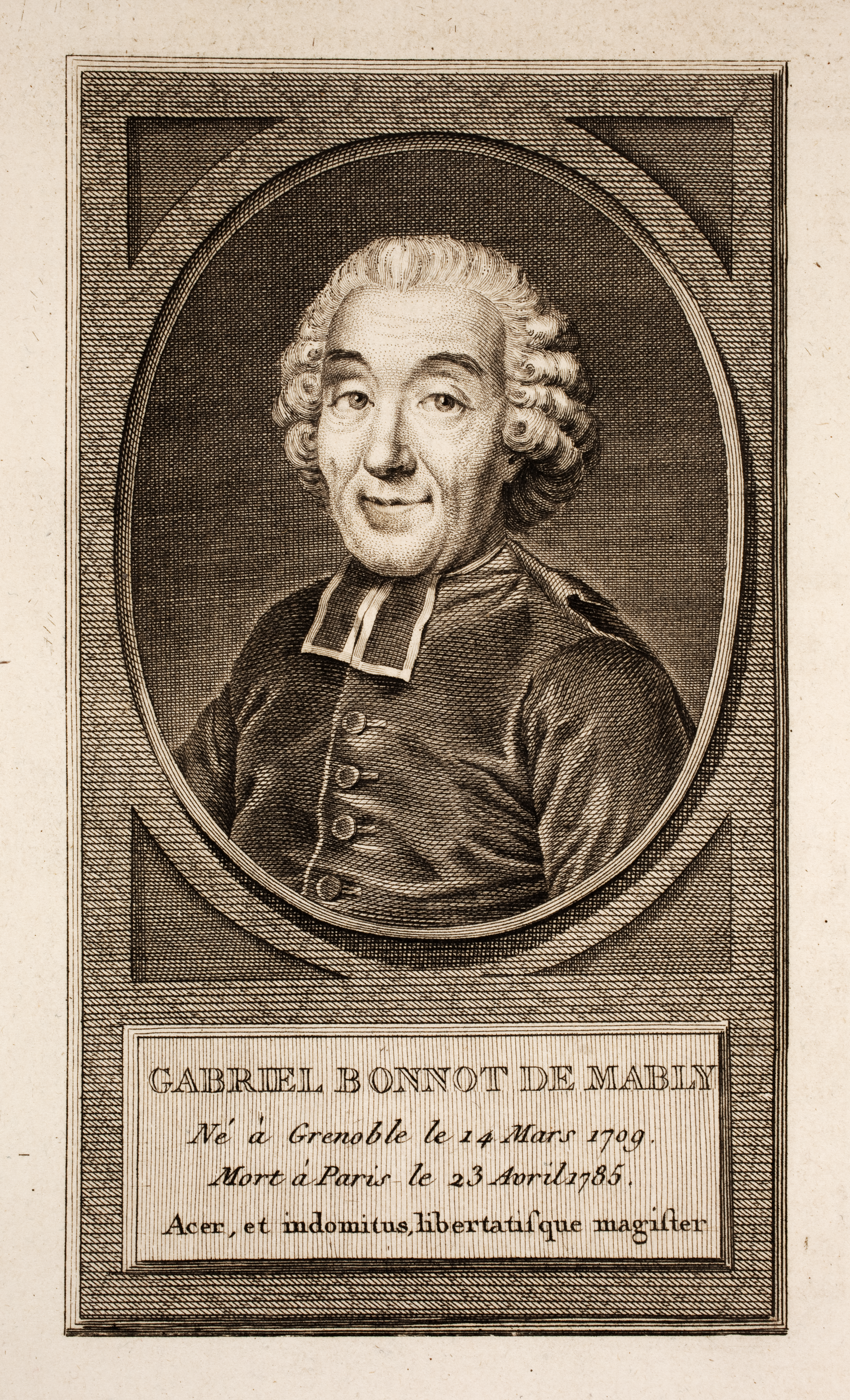
Engraving of Gabriel Bonnot de Mably

In 1909, the anarchist Peter Kropotkin credited Mably several achievements: he is credited with being responsible for why the study of politics, constitutions, and elective representation in the 18th century was so popular, with inspiring the egalitarian, communal, and anti-inequality ethos of the French Revolution, and for being an early advocate of communist or communal possession of the land.

His writing is quite famous, and his legacy has been claimed variously by monarchists and republicans, moderates and radical egalitarians. Though, despite being one of the central figures of French republicanism in the 18th century, sustained scholarly discussion of Mably was largely absent until after World War II.

== Writings ==
Mably's most well-known work is Entretiens de Phocion, a dialogue first published in 1763, which introduced themes of his mature thought. Two of his works were published posthumously and they had a profound effect on the early deliberations on the assembly of the Estates-General of 1789: an enlarged version of his Histoire de France (first published in 1765), which was published in May 1789 to great acclaim. Authorities tried unsuccessfully to suppress it by confiscating many copies. Secondly, Des droits et des devoirs du citoyen, written in 1758, was also published after his death. He warned against events that later developed during the French Revolution.

These two works were seen to contribute to the later concepts of both communism and republicanism. He advocated the abolition of private property, which he stated incompatible with sympathy and altruism, and conducive to one's antisociality or egotism. He praises elitist Plato, but also the enlightened Stoic views on natural human equality. Mably went further than the traditional Stoic argument that all men possessed a divine spark. He also went beyond the liberal concept of equality before the law, and argued for the equality of needs. He argued that virtue was more valued than the acquisition or possession of material wealth, and criticized idleness. He found an audience among those who were critical of the inherited wealth and privilege of the nobility, who did no work.

Mably's complete works were published in 15 volumes in 1794–1795, with an obituary/biography by Gabriel Brizard.

List of 18 published works by Gabriel Bonnot de Mably (1709–1785)

- Parallèle des Romains et des François par rapport au gouvernement (1740)
- Lettres à Madame la Marquise de P... sur l'Opéra (1741)
- Le droit public de l'Europe fondé sur les traités conclus jusqu'en l'année 1740 (1746)
- Observations sur les Grecs (1749)
- Observations sur les Romains (1751)
- Des principes des négociations pour servir au Droit public fondé sur les traités (1757)
- Entretiens de Phocion, sur l'introduction de la morale avec la politique, traduits du grec de Nicoclès, avec des remarques (1763)
- Réponse de M. Abbé de Mably à M. Abbé Rome (1764)
- Observations sur l'histoire de France, Books I – IV (1765)
- Observations sur l'histoire de la Grèce, ou Des causes de la Prospérité et des malheurs des Grecs (1766)
- Doutes proposées aux philosophes économistes sur l'Ordre naturel et essentiel des sociétés politiques (1768)
- Du commerce des grains (1775)
- De l'étude de l'histoire à Monseigneur le prince de Parme Tome XVI du cours d'études pour l'instruction du Prince de Parme, aujourd'hui S.A.R. l'Infant D. Ferdinand, duc de Parme, Plaisance, Gasuelle etc. par M. l'Abbé de Condillac (1775)
- De la législation, ou Principes des lois (1776)
- Du gouvernement et des lois de la Pologne (1771 or 1776 ?)
- De la manière d'écrire l'histoire (1783)
- Principes de morale (1784)
- Observations sur le gouvernement et les lois des États-Unis d'Amérique (1784)

Posthumous publications of individual works, published in 1786-1794

- Observations sur l'histoire de France, nouvelle édition précédée de l'éloge historique de L'auteur par M. l'abbé Brizard (1788)
- De la situation politique en Pologne en 1776
- Le Banquet des politiques
- De l'étude de la politique
- Des maladies politiques et de leur traitement
- Des droits et des devoirs du citoyen (1789; reprinted in 1793; written in 1758)
- Du commerce des grains
- De la superstition
- Notre gloire et nos rêves
- De la paix d'Allemagne
- De la mort de l'impératrice-reine
- L'oracle d'Apollon
- Des talens
- Du beau
- Du développement, des progrès et des bornes de la raison
- Le compte rendu
- La retraite de M. Necker
- Du cours et de la marche des passions dans la société

Posthumous Complete works to 1795

- Œuvres complètes de l'Abbé Mably précédées nouvelle édition précédée de l'éloge historique de l'auteur par M. l'abbé Brizard, 12 vol., slightly incomplete London edition (1789)
- Œuvres complètes de l'abbé Mably, 19 vol., Toulouse (Sens) & Nîmes (Gaude) edition, (1791)
- Œuvres complètes de l'abbé Mably, nouvelle édition; revue, corrigée et augmentée, 19 vols. Toulouse (Sens) & Nîmes (Gaudeedition), (1793)
- Collection complète des œuvres de l'abbé Mably, 15 vols. Paris edition (Desbrières), (1794/1795) more complete than previous editions.

Recent Translations in English by Simon de Vries

- Concerning the Rights & Duties of the Citizen – Comtal Publications, 2008 – ISBN 0-9557974-0-3
- Letters to Madame the Marchioness of P **** on the Opera – Comtal Publications, 2010 – ISBN 978-0-9557974-1-5
