= Chérubin d'Orléans =

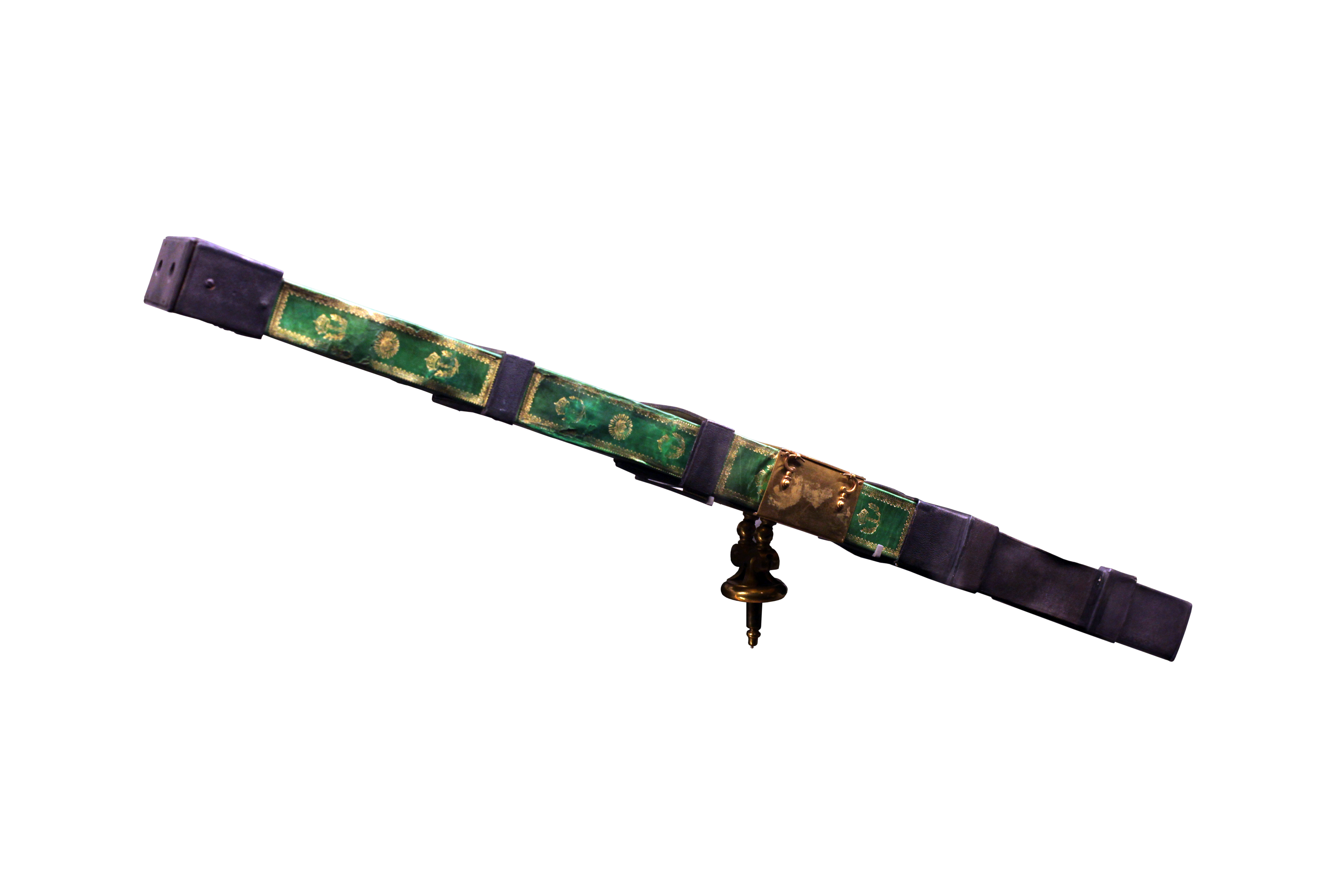
Chérubin's binocular telescope, on display at Musée des Arts et Métiers in Paris.

Chérubin d'Orléans (1614-1697) was a French scientific instrument maker.

== Biography ==
A Capucin father and distinguished physicist, Chérubin d'Orléans (Michel Lasseray) devoted himself to the study of optics and to vision-related problems, which he discussed in La dioptrique oculaire and La vision parfaite (Paris, 1671 and 1677 respectively). He developed a binocular telescope and he devised and may also have built a special type of eyepiece that replaced the lens with a short tube. Chérubin is also credited with producing models of the eyeball for studying the lens function of the eye. He also invented the stereo microscope, also called the dissecting microscope.

== Works ==
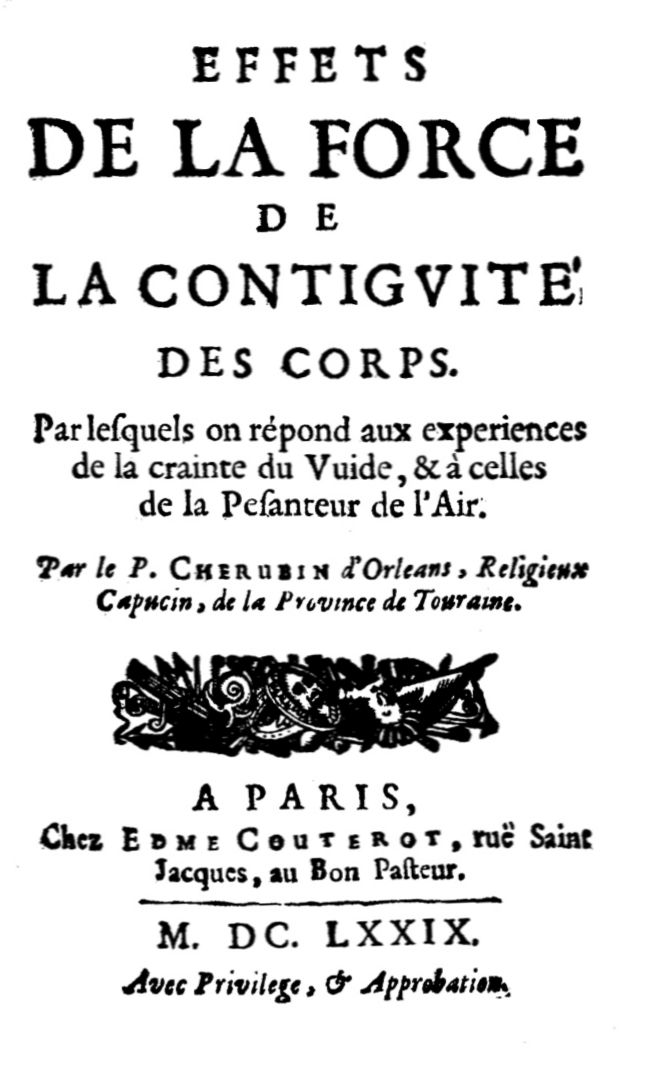
Effets de la force de la contiguité des corps, par lesquels on répond aux experiences de la crainte du vuide, et à celles de la pesanteur de l'air,1679

- Effets de la force de la contiguité des corps, par lesquels on répond aux experiences de la crainte du vuide, et à celles de la pesanteur de l'air (in French). Paris: Edme Couterot (1.). 1679.
