= Antoine Dorfeuille =

French politician, actor and journalist (1754–1795)

- Born: 1 December 1754; Étoges, France
- Died: 4 May 1795 (aged 40); Roanne, France
- Occupations: Actor; Playwright

Philippe-Antoine Dorfeuille (1 December 1754 – murdered 4 May 1795) was an 18th-century French actor, playwright, great traveller and revolutionary.

== Biography ==
Born in Étoges 1 December 1754, Philippe-Antoine Dorfeuille became a comedian. At the end of the Ancien Régime, theater was divided between provincial theaters, boulevard theatres and large institutions to privileges (Opera de Paris, Comédie-française). Poorly recognized by the Parisian theater, Dorfeuille tried twice unsuccessfully to enter the Théâtre français, playing in boulevard venues (Variétés-Amusantes, Salle Favart), and led a career in the province.

In 1775, he was part of Prince Charles de Lorraine's troupe. In 1777, he was the first player in the company of Ghent, where he staged his own plays. In 1779 he gave Le Protecteur ridicule then revived L'Illustre voyageur in Maastricht. Then he became, in 1782, one of the actors of the Comédie de Clermont-Ferrand.

== Works ==
Theatre

- La Lanterne magique patriotique: ou, Le Coup de grace de l'aristocratie, Imprimerie de Fiévée, 1791, 21 pages

Diary

- Je suis le véritable Père Duchesne, foutre !, Commune-Affranchie, Bernard, #25-32, 20 Nivôse–2 Germinal An II

Speeches, reports

- La Religion de Dieu et la religion du diable, précédée du sermon civique aux gardes nationales, Pau, J. P. Vignancour, 1791, 48 pages
- Discours prononcé sur la place du Verney, le 30 ventôse, devant le peuple assemblé, à Chambery, département du Mont-Blanc, s.n., 3 pages
- Second sermon civique aux soldats de la république, Imprimerie de L. Potier de Lille, 1793, 8 pages
- Motion faite au club des Jacobins de Toulouse, sous la présidence de M. Saurine, à l'honneur des mânes de Lavigne et Françe, soldats nationaux de cette ville, morts victimes des ennemis de la Constitution, le 19 mars 1791,
- Dorfeuille, commissaire des représentans du peuple, aux volontaires des armées de la République, Roanne, Imprimerie de J.-B. Cabot, 1793
- Dorfeuille, commissaire des représentans du peuple, aux habitans du district de Roanne et des lieux circonvoisins, Roanne, Imprimerie de J. B. Cabot, 1793
- Éloge funèbre de Chalier assassiné judiciairement le 16 juillet, par les aristocrates de Lyon, aujourd'hui ville affranchie, prononcé par Dorfeuille, président de la Commission de justice populaire, sur la place de la Liberté, ci-devant place de Terreaux, s.n., 1793–1794

Report of his wife

- Relations du citoyen Dorfeuille, égorgé dans les prisons de Lyon par les gens des émigrés, s.n., 1795

== Sources ==
- Philippe Bourdin, « Révolution et engagement militant à l'aune des biographies », dans Siècles, Cahiers du centre d'histoire « Espaces et cultures », Clermont-Ferrand, Presses Universitaires Blaise Pascal-Clermont-Ferrand II, #11 « Engagements politiques », premier semestre 2000, (p. 7–33)
- Jérôme Croyet, Sous le bonnet rouge, thèse d'histoire, Université Lumière Lyon II, 2003. A.D. Ain Bib TU 392

== See also ==
- Revolt of Lyon against the National Convention
- First White Terror
