= Riorges =

- Commune
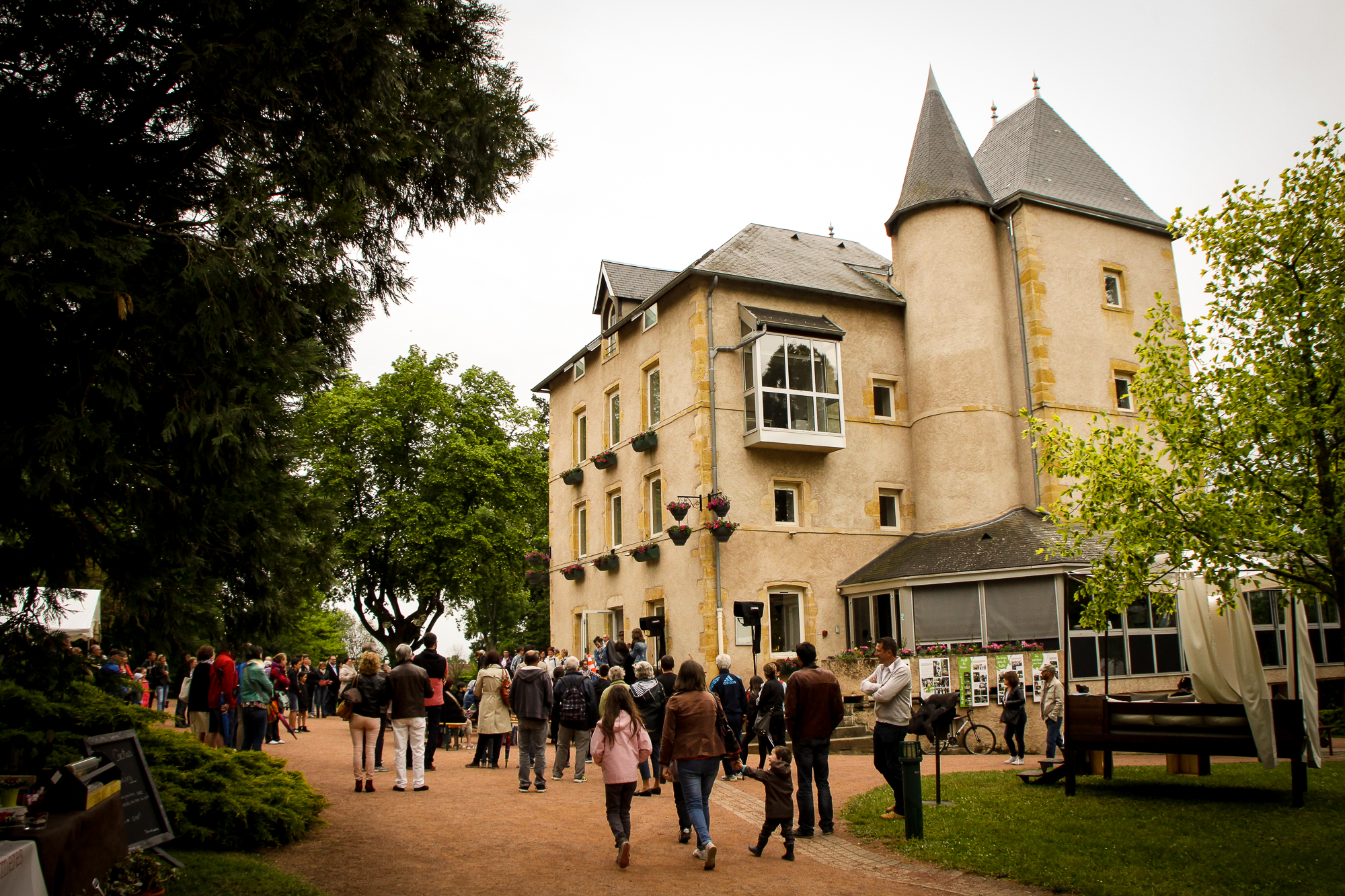
- Beaulieu castle

- Coat of arms
- Location of Riorges
- Location within France Location within Auvergne-Rhône-Alpes
- Coordinates: 46°02′37″N 4°02′29″E
- Country: France
- Region: Auvergne-Rhône-Alpes
- Department: Loire
- Arrondissement: Roanne
- Canton: Roanne-2
- Intercommunality: Roannais Agglomération

Government
  - Mayor (2020–2026): Jean-Luc Chervin
- Area^{1}: 15.51 km^{2} (5.99 sq mi)
- Elevation: 295 m (968 ft)
- Highest elevation: 334 m (1,096 ft)
- Lowest elevation: 277 m (909 ft)
- Population (2023): 11,139
  - Density: 718.2/km^{2} (1,860/sq mi)
- Time zone: UTC+01:00 (CET)
  - Summer (DST): UTC+02:00 (CEST)
- INSEE/Postal code: 42184 /42153
- ^{1} French Land Register data, which excludes lakes, ponds, glaciers > 1 km^{2} (0.386 sq mi or 247 acres) and river estuaries.

Riorges (French pronunciation: [ʁjɔʁʒ]) is a commune in the Loire department in central France.

== Population ==
Historical population

Year	Pop.	±% p.a.
1793	300	—
1800	300	+0.00%
1806	388	+4.38%
1821	461	+1.16%
1831	748	+4.96%
1836	748	+0.00%
1841	860	+2.83%
1846	1,104	+5.12%
1851	1,243	+2.40%
1856	1,470	+3.41%
1861	2,355	+9.88%
1866	1,110	−13.97%
1872	1,283	+2.44%
1876	1,472	+3.50%
1881	1,475	+0.04%
1886	1,764	+3.64%
1891	1,772	+0.09%
1896	2,011	+2.56%
1901	2,550	+4.86%

Year	Pop.	±% p.a.
1906	2,736	+1.42%
1911	2,955	+1.55%
1921	3,095	+0.46%
1926	3,508	+2.54%
1931	4,503	+5.12%
1936	5,118	+2.59%
1946	5,869	+1.38%
1954	6,280	+0.85%
1962	7,269	+1.84%
1968	8,536	+2.71%
1975	9,358	+1.32%
1982	8,989	−0.57%
1990	9,868	+1.17%
1999	10,074	+0.23%
2007	10,333	+0.32%
2012	10,725	+0.75%
2017	10,774	+0.09%
2023	11,139	+0.56%

Source: EHESS and INSEE (1968-2023)

== Le Scarabée ==
Opened in 2008, Le Scarabée is a building designed by architect Alain Sarfati. It has hosted a large number of events: trade shows, shows, concerts, conventions of companies, seminars, congresses, and general assemblies.

It has a maximum seated capacity of 5,500 for concerts. Le Scarabée was largely funded by Grand Roanne Agglomération who invested 23 million euros. The management and organisation were entrusted to the international company GL Events, led locally by Laurence Bussière.

The venue was inaugurated on December 8, 2008, with a concert by Charles Aznavour. In 2019, it was the start and finish of Stage 4 of the Criterium de Dauphine, an Individual Time Trial won by Wout Van Aert.

Since 2008, Le Scarabée has visited by more than a million visitors.

== Twin towns – sister cities ==
Riorges is twinned with:

- Calasparra, Spain
- Donzdorf, Germany
- Elland, England, United Kingdom
- Piatra Neamț, Romania

== See also ==
- Communes of the Loire department
