= Pierre-Paul Gobet, called Dorfeuille =

Pierre Paul Gobet, called Dorfeuille (c.1745 – c.1806), was a French actor and playwright.

== Biography ==
After he played at Lille in 1768, then in La Rochelle and Poitiers from 1773 to 1775, he was hired by the Théâtre de la Monnaie in Brussels that latter year. He was in Ghent in 1777, where he created L'Illustre voyageur, ou le retour du comte de Falkenstein dans ses États, comedy in homage to Joseph II, in Nancy in 1778, in Nantes in 1779, then he joined Jean-Baptiste Hus and Félix Gaillard to direct the newly built Grand Théâtre de Bordeaux from 1781 to 1783.

Arrived in Paris in 1783, he had the Comédie Italienne perform his Henri d'Albret, ou le roi de Navarre, which had no success, and wrote Le Soldat laboureur, announced at the Théâtre-Français by La Harpe but not played. In 1784, he had Ariste, ou Les Écueils de l'éducation presented, appearing on the 1790 directory, but was not included. Still in 1784, he received a start command to the Comédie Française but was not received.

Returning then to province, he led troupes in The Hague, Dijon, Ostend and Cambrai. In 1790 Dorfeuille obtained with Félix Gaillard, theatre director of Lyon, the privilege of the Théâtre de l'Ambigu-Comique and the Théâtre des Variétés-Amusantes, which he mloved from the rue de Bondi to the Palais-Royal, where he had a salle built.

Indeed, protected by the Duke of Orléans, he was the first tenant of the new salle of the Comédie-Française situated at the Théâtre du Palais-Royal. In 1791, dissidents of the Théâtre-Français, led by Talma, Dugazon and Grandmesnil settled there. The first play the performed was Henri VIII, with Talma in the title-role, 27 April 1791. In 1792, separated from Gaillard, for political reasons, he gave lessons in declamation.

In June 1795, he asked permission to open an Odéon national on the site of the former Théâtre-Français (modern Théâtre de l'Odéon), which would operated only one month. In 1799 he established a theatre for young comedians, the Théâtre des Jeunes Élèves, rue dauphine, and published L'Art de la représentation théâtrale the following year.

The date of his death, placed by some biographers in 1806 is uncertain.

== Works ==
- 1778: L'Illustre voyageur, ou le retour du comte de Falkenstein dans ses États, comedy in two acts, Ghent and Paris
- 1783: Henri d'Albret, ou le roi de Navarre, one-act comedy, Paris, Comédie Italienne
- 1783: Le Soldat laboureur, non represented comedy
- 1783: L'Esprit des Almanachs, ou analyse critique et curieuse de tous les almanachs, tant anciens que modernes, Paris
- 1784: Ariste, ou Les Écueils de l'éducation, comedy in 5 acts, Paris.
- 1801: Les Éléments de l'Art du Comédien, ou l'art de la représentation théâtrale considéré dans chacune des parties qui le composent, Paris.

== Sources ==
- "Dorfeuille (P.-P.)", in Joseph Fr. Michaud, Louis Gabriel Michaud (dir.), Biographie universelle, ancienne et moderne, ou, Histoire par, Paris, L.-G. Michaud, 1837, supplément (« DA-DR »), tome 62, (p. 545–546)
- A. Jadin, "Dorfeuille (P.-P.)", in Jean-Chrétien Ferdinand Hoefer, Nouvelle biographie générale depuis les temps les plus reculés jusqu'à nos jours, Paris, Firmin Didot, frères, fils et Cie, 1858, tome 14, (p. 605–606)
