= Mably, Loire =

Mably
- Commune
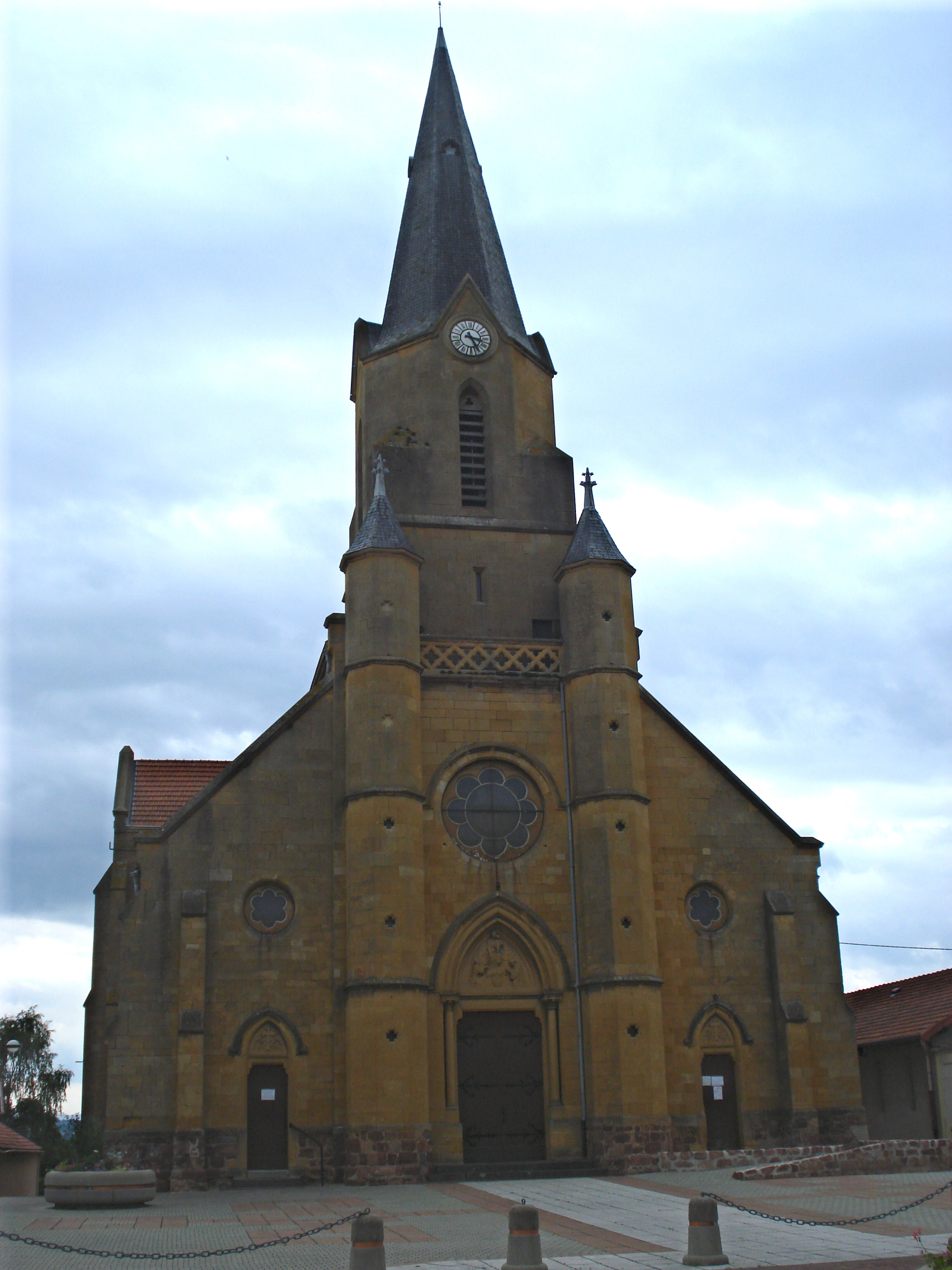

- Coat of arms
- Location of Mably
- Location within France Location within Auvergne-Rhône-Alpes
- Coordinates: 46°05′12″N 4°03′55″E
- Country: France
- Region: Auvergne-Rhône-Alpes
- Department: Loire
- Arrondissement: Roanne
- Canton: Roanne-1
- Intercommunality: Roannais Agglomération

Government
  - Mayor (2020–2026): Eric Peyron
- Area^{1}: 32.8 km^{2} (12.7 sq mi)
- Highest elevation: 353 m (1,158 ft)
- Lowest elevation: 257 m (843 ft)
- Population (2023): 7,233
  - Density: 221/km^{2} (571/sq mi)
- Time zone: UTC+01:00 (CET)
  - Summer (DST): UTC+02:00 (CEST)
- INSEE/Postal code: 42127 /42300
- ^{1} French Land Register data, which excludes lakes, ponds, glaciers > 1 km^{2} (0.386 sq mi or 247 acres) and river estuaries.

Mably (French pronunciation: [mabli]) is a commune in the Loire department in central France.

== Population ==
Historical population
Year	Pop.	±% p.a.
1968	5,301	—
1975	6,548	+3.06%
1982	7,945	+2.80%
1990	8,291	+0.53%
1999	7,624	−0.93%
2007	7,496	−0.21%
2012	7,614	+0.31%
2017	7,605	−0.02%
2023	7,233	−0.83%
Source: INSEE

== International relations ==
Mably is twinned with:

- (United Kingdom) Wantage-Grove, Oxfordshire, England
- Wannweil, Germany
- Piatra Neamţ, Romania

== See also ==
- Communes of the Loire department
