= Roanne =

- Subprefecture and commune
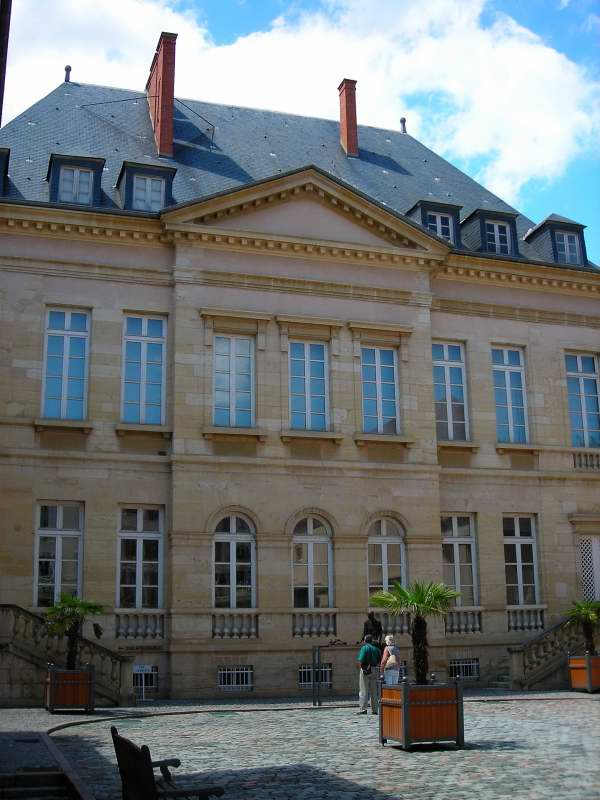
- Musée Déchelette

- Coat of arms
- Location of Roanne
- Location within France Location within Auvergne-Rhône-Alpes
- Coordinates: 46°02′12″N 4°04′08″E
- Country: France
- Region: Auvergne-Rhône-Alpes
- Department: Loire
- Arrondissement: Roanne
- Canton: Roanne-1 and 2
- Intercommunality: Roannais Agglomération

Government
  - Mayor (2020–2026): Yves Nicolin (LR)
- Area^{1}: 16.12 km^{2} (6.22 sq mi)
- Elevation: 279 m (915 ft)
- Highest elevation: 304 m (997 ft)
- Lowest elevation: 257 m (843 ft)
- Population (2023): 35,409
  - Density: 2,197/km^{2} (5,689/sq mi)
- Time zone: UTC+01:00 (CET)
  - Summer (DST): UTC+02:00 (CEST)
- INSEE/Postal code: 42187 /42300
- ^{1} French Land Register data, which excludes lakes, ponds, glaciers > 1 km^{2} (0.386 sq mi or 247 acres) and river estuaries.

Roanne (French pronunciation: [ʁɔan]; Arpitan: Rouana; Occitan: Roana) is a commune in the Loire department, central France.

It is located 90 km (56 mi) northwest of Lyon on the river Loire. It has an important Museum, the Musée des Beaux-arts et d'Archéologie Joseph-Déchelette (French), with many Egyptian artifacts.

== Economy ==
Roanne is known for gastronomy (largely because of the famous Troisgros family), textiles, agriculture and manufacturing tanks.

Roanne station has rail connections to Clermont-Ferrand, Saint-Étienne, Moulins and Lyon.

The Roanne region produces, particularly, fresh red wines designated as of the Côte Roannaise.

== History ==
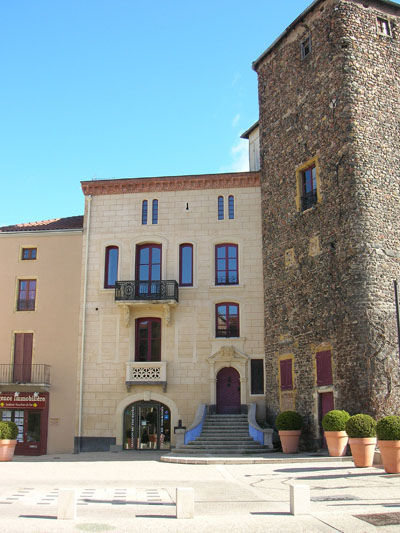
Tourism office.

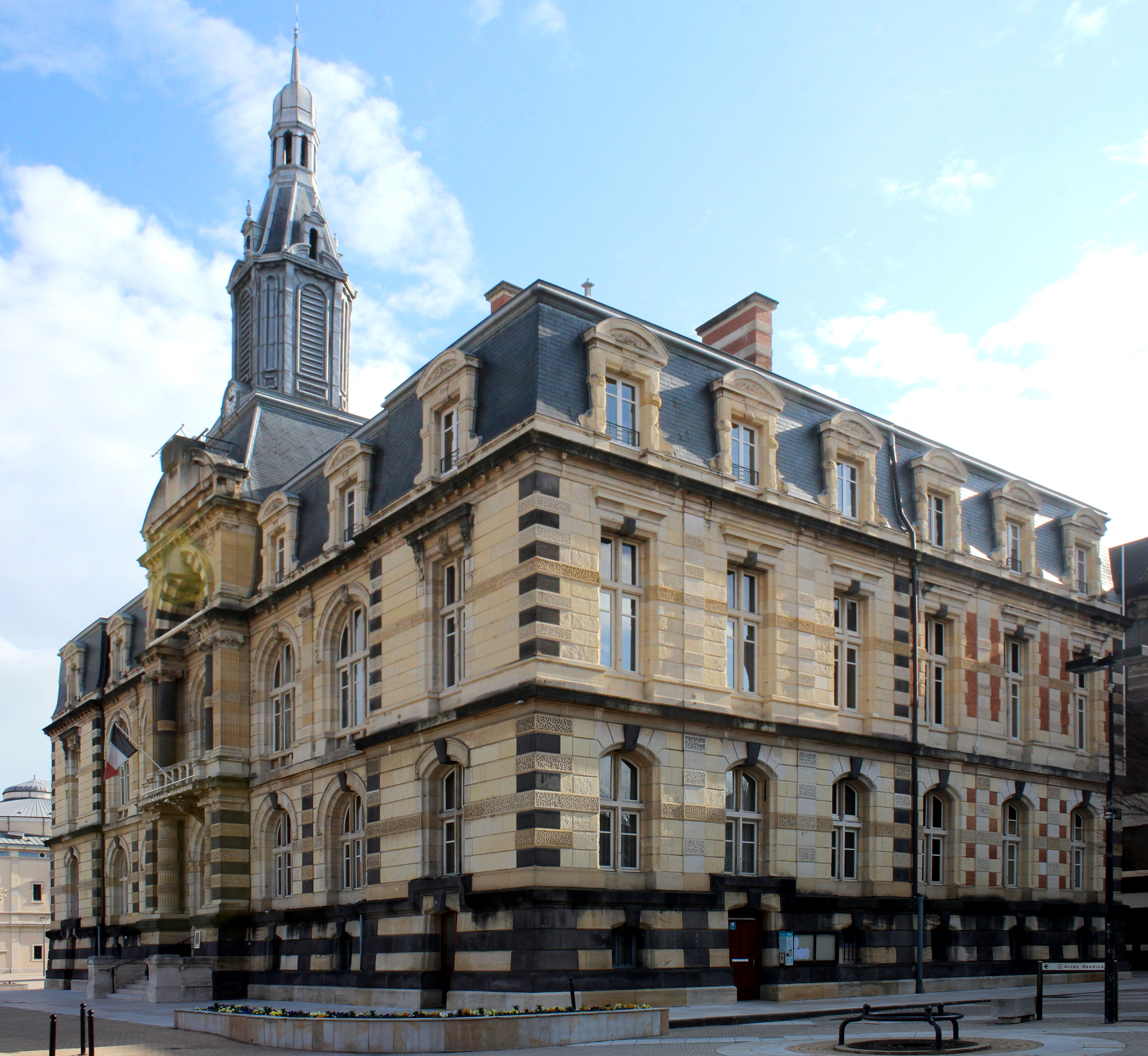
The Hôtel de Ville

The toponymy is Gaulish, Rod-Onna ("flowing water") which became Rodumna, then Rouhanne and Roanne. The town was sited at a strategic point, the head of navigation on the Loire, below its narrow gorges. As a trans-shipping point, its importance declined with the collapse of long-distance trade after the fourth century. In the twelfth century, the site passed to the comte du Forez, under whose care it began to recover. An overland route led to Lyon and the Rhône, thus Roanne developed as a transshipping point between Paris and the Mediterranean in early modern France, when waterways were at least as important as roads.

The renewed navigation on the Loire encouraged the export of local products: wines, including casks of Beaujolais that had been shipped overland, ceramics, textiles, and after 1785, coal from Saint-Étienne, which had formerly been onloaded upstream at Saint-Rambert, since river improvements at the beginning of the century. Sturdy goods were rafted downriver on sapinières that were dismantled after use. Half the population of seventeenth and eighteenth-century Roanne depended in some way on this transportation economy: merchants and factors, carriers, carpenters and coopers, master-boatmen and their journeymen and oarsmen, and waterfront laborers (Braudel p360f).

Roanne was one of the first towns served by railroad, with the opening, 15 March 1833, of the terminal on the right bank at the port of Varennes of the third line, from Andrézieux. Following came the opening of the canal from Roanne to Digoin (1838), which placed the city in the forefront of the French Industrial Revolution.

The Hôtel de Ville was completed in 1874.

In 1917 the arsenal was established at Roanne, and from 1940 a new industry developed, producing rayon and other new fibers. In the post-industrial phase that set in during the 1970s, Roanne struggled to find new industry and attract tourism.

The 18th-century actor, playwright and revolutionary Antoine Dorfeuille (1754–1795) was murdered in Roanne.

== Population ==
Historical population

Year	Pop.	±% p.a.
1793	8,500	—
1800	6,992	−2.75%
1806	7,270	+0.65%
1821	8,370	+0.94%
1831	9,260	+1.02%
1836	9,910	+1.37%
1841	11,330	+2.71%
1846	12,959	+2.72%
1851	13,397	+0.67%
1856	15,139	+2.47%
1861	17,398	+2.82%
1866	19,354	+2.15%
1872	20,037	+0.58%
1876	22,797	+3.28%
1881	25,425	+2.21%
1886	30,402	+3.64%
1891	31,380	+0.64%
1896	33,912	+1.56%
1901	34,901	+0.58%

Year	Pop.	±% p.a.
1906	35,516	+0.35%
1911	36,697	+0.66%
1921	37,752	+0.28%
1926	38,469	+0.38%
1931	40,502	+1.04%
1936	41,460	+0.47%
1946	44,518	+0.71%
1954	46,501	+0.55%
1962	51,731	+1.34%
1968	53,381	+0.52%
1975	55,195	+0.48%
1982	48,705	−1.77%
1990	41,756	−1.91%
1999	38,896	−0.79%
2007	35,750	−1.05%
2012	35,799	+0.03%
2017	34,366	−0.81%
2023	35,409	+0.50%

Source: EHESS and INSEE (1968–2023)

== Sports ==
The city is home to Chorale Roanne Basket, two-time champion of France's top basketball league LNB Pro A. The team plays its home games at the Halle André Vacheresse.

== Transport ==
The nearest airports are Lyon–Saint-Exupéry Airport, located 122 km (76 mi) south east and Geneva Airport, located 251 km (156 mi) to the east of Roanne.

== Notable people ==
Roanne was the birthplace of:

- Édouard Carpentier (1926–2010), professional wrestler
- Laurent Chabry (1855–1894), biologist who worked in the flying mechanisms of birds and insects
- Jean-Baptiste Nompère de Champagny (1756–1834) was a French politician
- Joseph Déchelette (1862–1914), archaeologist
- Henri Dentz (1881–1945), French Army officer and collaborator
- Jérémie Dufour (born 1975), racing driver
- Pierre Étaix (born 1928), film director
- Jean-Pierre Jeunet (born 1953), film director
- Jean-Luc Lavrille (born 1952), poet
- René Leriche (1870–1955), surgeon
- David Ramseyer, basketball player
- Michel Troisgros (born 1958), Michelin-starred chef, La Maison Troisgros
- Antoine Vermorel-Marques (born 1993), Member of Parliament

== Twin towns – sister cities ==
Roanne is twinned with:

- Guadalajara, Spain
- Legnica, Poland
- Montevarchi, Italy
- Nuneaton and Bedworth, United Kingdom
- Piatra Neamţ, Romania
- Reutlingen, Germany

== Climate ==
Climate data for Roanne (Saint-Léger-sur-Roanne), elevation 337 m (1,106 ft), (2005–2020 normals, extremes 2005–present)
Month	Jan	Feb	Mar	Apr	May	Jun	Jul	Aug	Sep	Oct	Nov	Dec	Year
Record high °C (°F)	18.3 (64.9)	21.7 (71.1)	25.2 (77.4)	29.0 (84.2)	33.7 (92.7)	39.3 (102.7)	39.8 (103.6)	41.4 (106.5)	35.2 (95.4)	31.8 (89.2)	22.2 (72.0)	19.4 (66.9)	41.4 (106.5)
Mean daily maximum °C (°F)	7.3 (45.1)	8.6 (47.5)	12.6 (54.7)	16.9 (62.4)	20.0 (68.0)	24.3 (75.7)	26.7 (80.1)	26.0 (78.8)	22.3 (72.1)	17.5 (63.5)	11.7 (53.1)	8.1 (46.6)	16.8 (62.2)
Daily mean °C (°F)	3.9 (39.0)	4.5 (40.1)	7.6 (45.7)	11.1 (52.0)	14.4 (57.9)	18.5 (65.3)	20.6 (69.1)	19.9 (67.8)	16.4 (61.5)	12.7 (54.9)	7.8 (46.0)	4.6 (40.3)	11.8 (53.2)
Mean daily minimum °C (°F)	0.5 (32.9)	0.3 (32.5)	2.5 (36.5)	5.4 (41.7)	8.9 (48.0)	12.6 (54.7)	14.5 (58.1)	13.7 (56.7)	10.5 (50.9)	8.0 (46.4)	3.9 (39.0)	1.0 (33.8)	6.8 (44.2)
Record low °C (°F)	−12.8 (9.0)	−15.6 (3.9)	−7.1 (19.2)	−5.0 (23.0)	−0.4 (31.3)	4.2 (39.6)	7.2 (45.0)	4.8 (40.6)	0.9 (33.6)	−5.2 (22.6)	−7.4 (18.7)	−11.1 (12.0)	−15.6 (3.9)
Average precipitation mm (inches)	36.9 (1.45)	29.7 (1.17)	41.8 (1.65)	50.2 (1.98)	75.5 (2.97)	75.5 (2.97)	81.0 (3.19)	66.1 (2.60)	54.6 (2.15)	57.6 (2.27)	57.8 (2.28)	41.4 (1.63)	668.1 (26.30)
Average precipitation days (≥ 1.0 mm)	8.2	7.8	8.4	7.9	11.4	8.7	8.4	7.9	6.7	7.4	8.8	10.0	101.6
Source: Meteociel

== Sources ==
- Braudel, Fernand, 1982. The Wheels of Commerce, vol. II of Civilization and Capitalism p. 360.
