= Canton of Saint-Symphorien-de-Lay =

Coordinates: 45.9443°N 4.1990°E

Saint-Symphorien-de-Lay
- Former canton
- Interactive map of Saint-Symphorien-de-Lay
- Country: France
- Region: Auvergne-Rhône-Alpes
- Department: Loire
- No. of communes: {{{nbcomm}}}
- Disbanded: 2015
- Area: 251.59 km^{2} (97.14 sq mi)
- Population (2012): 13,641
  - Density: 54.219/km^{2} (140.43/sq mi)

The canton of Saint-Symphorien-de-Lay is a French former administrative division located in the department of Loire and the Rhône-Alpes region. It was disbanded following the French canton reorganisation which came into effect in March 2015. It had 13,641 inhabitants (2012).

The canton comprised the following communes:

- Chirassimont
- Cordelle
- Croizet-sur-Gand
- Fourneaux
- Lay
- Machézal
- Neaux
- Neulise
- Pradines
- Régny
- Saint-Cyr-de-Favières
- Saint-Just-la-Pendue
- Saint-Priest-la-Roche
- Saint-Symphorien-de-Lay
- Saint-Victor-sur-Rhins
- Vendranges

== See also ==
- Cantons of the Loire department
