= Canton of Néronde =

Coordinates: 45.8579°N 4.2394°E

Néronde
- Former canton
- Interactive map of Néronde
- Country: France
- Region: Auvergne-Rhône-Alpes
- Department: Loire
- No. of communes: {{{nbcomm}}}
- Disbanded: 2015
- Area: 131.94 km^{2} (50.94 sq mi)
- Population (2012): 8,747
  - Density: 66.30/km^{2} (171.7/sq mi)

The canton of Néronde is a French former administrative division located in the department of Loire and the Rhone-Alpes region. It was disbanded following the French canton reorganisation which came into effect in March 2015. It consisted of 10 communes, which joined the new canton of Le Coteau in 2015. It had 8,747 inhabitants (2012).

The canton comprised the following communes:

- Balbigny
- Bussières
- Néronde
- Pinay
- Sainte-Agathe-en-Donzy
- Sainte-Colombe-sur-Gand
- Saint-Cyr-de-Valorges
- Saint-Jodard
- Saint-Marcel-de-Félines
- Violay

== See also ==
- Cantons of the Loire department
