= Route nationale 7 =

Road in France

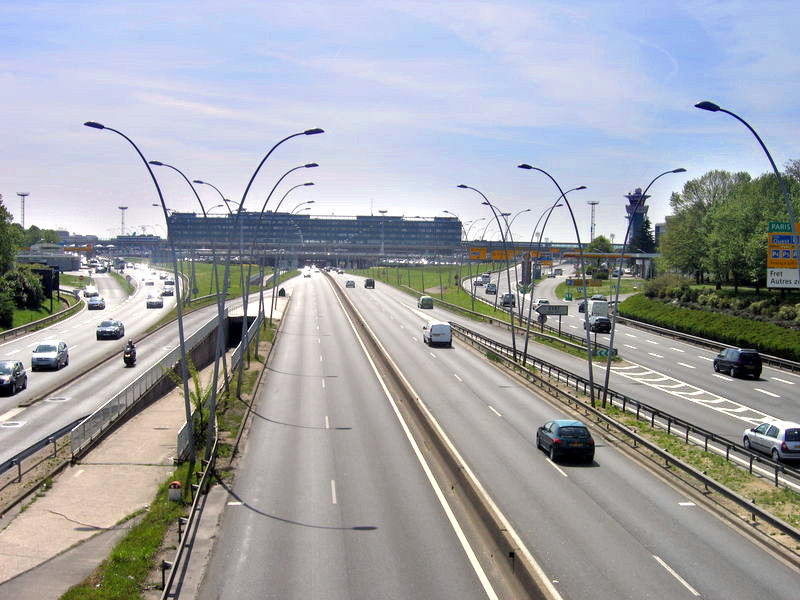
Route 7 near Orly Airport in Paris

The Route nationale 7, or RN 7, is a trunk road (nationale) in France between Paris and the border with Italy. It was also known as Route des vacances (The Holiday Route), Route bleue (The Blue Route), and — sarcastically, during the annual rush to the Mediterranean beaches — the Route de la mort (Road of Death).

== History ==
The Romans under Marcus Agrippa established a network of roads circa 39 BC to 15 BC radiating from the then capital of the Gauls at Lugdunum (Lyon), known collectively as Via Agrippa. From Lugdunum the road north passed towards Lutèce (Paris) following roughly the route of current RN 6, and southward towards Rome, skirting the Rhone and passing through Arausio (Orange) and following the edge of the Mediterranean, like the current RN 7.

In the 15th century, with the creation of the royal post by Louis XI, a coherent network of roads was set up. The routes from Paris to Lyon pass through Moulins (route du Bourbonnais) or Dijon (route de Bourgogne). In the next century the first regular use of the road is made and elms were planted along the ways for shade and to mark the route. At that time (1553) the Le Guide des chemins de France ("Guide to the trails of France"), by the royal printer Robert Estienne, the ancestor of all the modern guidebooks, was published.

== Reclassification ==
The RN 7 is being upgraded or replaced by the A77 autoroute. As the route elsewhere runs parallel to autoroutes as a result other sections have been re-numbered the RD 7, RD 607, RD 307, RD 907, RD 707, RD 207, RD 7n, RDN 7 and RD 6007.

== Route ==
Paris-Nemours-Moulins-Lyon-Avignon-Aix-en-Provence-Nice-Italy

=== Paris to Nemours (0 km to 64 km) ===
The road starts at the Porte d'Italie in Paris and is called the Avenue de Fontainebleau. The road passes through Southern Parisian suburbs and under the Aéroport of Paris-Orly before reaching the Seine at Évry. It then follows the West bank of the river to the South. The road enters the Forêt de Fontainebleau and then the town of Fontainebleau with a junction with the RN 6. The RN 7 then heads South along the Loing valley before reaching Nemours and a junction with the A6 autoroute.

=== Nemours to Lyon (64 km to 438 km) ===
After Nemours the road continues along the East bank of the Loire past the Rochers de Nemours and parallel to the A 77. The road follows a route to Montargis and after the Forêt de Montargis heads down into the Loire Valley at Briare. The road then follows the East bank of the Loire and after Cosne-Cours-sur-Loire the road has been upgraded to the A 77. This is prime wine producing territory with Sancerre 6 km to the West and Pouilly where the RN 7 commences again.

After the town of Nevers the road passes Magny-Cours race track and crosses the river. It follows the Allier valley through gently rolling countryside to Moulins where the RN 9 branches off to the South. The RN 7 heads East climbing over hills at Lapalisse and then back into the Loire valley crossing the river again at Roanne at the head of the Gorges de la Loire. The road is then dual carriageway south before turning east over the Col du Pin Bouchain (760 m). The road then heads down into Tarare and through a series of ridges to Lyon.

=== Lyon to Avignon (438 km to 662 km) ===
The road crosses the Rhône and heads South through the Bois de St Jean. It has a junction with the A 46 (E 70) as it travels South to Vienne. The A 7 runs parallel and now takes the bulk of through traffic. The road passes Le Péage-de-Roussillon and follows the East bank of the river to Tain-l'Hermitage. It then crosses the river Isère to Valence. A bridge over the river Drôme brings the road to Montélimar.

The road then sweeps round the Défilé de Donzère before crossing the navigable Canal de Donzère and past the Tricastin nuclear station. After which the road crosses the canal and follows the East bank of the Rhône to Orange. The road skirts hills to reach Avignon and enters Provence.

=== Avignon to Italy (662 km to 931 km) ===
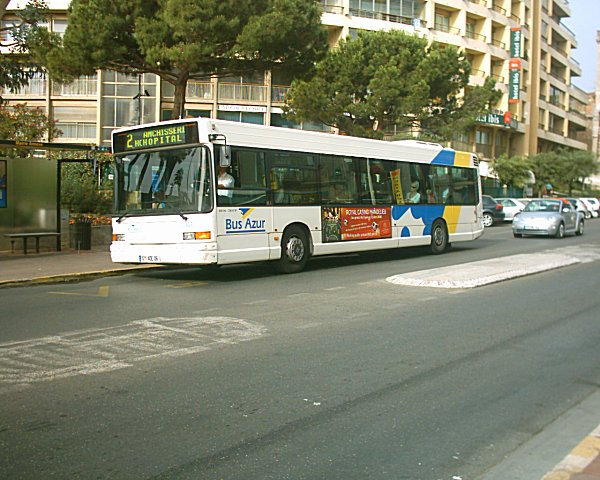
The RN 7 as Avenue Francis Tonner in Cannes

After Avignon the road heads south east across the river Durance and East of Les plaines and then Southeast over Plat de Seze Chaine and parallel to the Chaine de la Trévaresse and Chaine d’Éguilles to Aix-en-Provence. The road then runs parallel to the A 8 South of Montagne du Cergle and past Mont Aurélien (875 m).

After Brignoles the road is dual-carriageway and goes past Parc Mini France and into the Argens valley before reaching the Mediterranean at Fréjus. The road then turns north away from the coast passing north round the Massif de l'Esterel and Mont Vinaigre (618 m) to the Côte d’Azur. The road reaches Cannes and then follows the coast round the Golfe St Juan past Antibes to Nice.

After Nice the road takes the Moyenne Corniche around Monaco before reaching the frontier with Italy after Menton. The road in Italy becomes the SS1 (Strada Statale 1 "Aurelia") and ends in Rome, while the A8 autoroute becomes the Autostrada A10 and ends in Genoa.

=== List of communes ===
- Île-de-France: Paris (Porte d'Italie), Le Kremlin-Bicêtre, Villejuif, L'Haÿ-les-Roses, Vitry-sur-Seine, Chevilly-Larue, Thiais, Rungis, Orly, passing over tracks of Orly Airport, Villeneuve-le-Roi, Paray-Vieille-Poste, Athis-Mons, Juvisy-sur-Orge, Viry-Châtillon, Grigny, Ris-Orangis, Évry, Corbeil-Essonnes, Le Coudray-Montceaux (Plessis Chenet), Saint-Fargeau-Ponthierry, Pringy, Villiers-en-Bière, Chailly-en-Bière, Forest of Fontainebleau, Fontainebleau, Bourron-Marlotte, Grez-sur-Loing, Saint-Pierre-lès-Nemours, Nemours, Souppes-sur-Loing.
- Centre-Val de Loire: Dordives, Fontenay-sur-Loing, Cepoy, Châlette-sur-Loing, Montargis, Amilly, Mormant-sur-Vernisson, Solterre (La Commodité), Nogent-sur-Vernisson, Boismorand (Les Bézards), La Bussière, Briare, Bonny-sur-Loire.
- Burgundy (Nièvre): Neuvy-sur-Loire, La Celle-sur-Loire, Myennes, Cosne-Cours-sur-Loire, Tracy-sur-Loire (Maltaverne), Pouilly-sur-Loire, Mesves-sur-Loire, La Charité-sur-Loire, La Marche, Tronsanges, Pougues-les-Eaux, Varennes-Vauzelles, Nevers, Challuy, Sermoise-sur-Loire, Magny-Cours, Saint-Parize-le-Châtel (Moiry), Saint-Pierre-le-Moûtier, Chantenay-Saint-Imbert, Tresnay.
- Auvergne (Allier): Villeneuve-sur-Allier, Trévol, Avermes, Moulins, Toulon-sur-Allier, Bessay-sur-Allier, Saint-Loup, Varennes-sur-Allier, Rongères, Saint-Gérand-le-Puy, Périgny, Lapalisse, Saint-Prix, Saint-Pierre-Laval.
- Rhône-Alpes: Saint-Martin-d'Estréaux, La Pacaudière, Changy, Saint-Forgeux-Lespinasse, Saint-Germain-Lespinasse, Saint-Romain-la-Motte, Roanne, Le Coteau, Parigny, Saint-Vincent-de-Boisset, Saint-Cyr-de-Favières, Neaux, Saint-Symphorien-de-Lay, Fourneaux, Machézal, Joux, Tarare, Pontcharra-sur-Turdine, Bully, L'Arbresle, Fleurieux-sur-l'Arbresle, Lentilly, La Tour-de-Salvagny, Dardilly, Charbonnières-les-Bains, Tassin-la-Demi-Lune, Lyon, Vénissieux, Feyzin, Saint-Symphorien-d'Ozon, Communay (Les Pins), Vienne, Reventin-Vaugris, Chonas-l'Amballan, Auberives-sur-Varèze, Le Péage-de-Roussillon, Roussillon, Salaise-sur-Sanne, Chanas, Saint-Rambert-d'Albon, Le Creux-de-la-Thine, Andancette, Saint-Vallier, Ponsas, Serves-sur-Rhône, Érôme, Gervans, Tain-l'Hermitage, Pont-de-l'Isère, Bourg-lès-Valence, Valence, Portes-lès-Valence, Loriol-sur-Drôme, Saulce-sur-Rhône, La Coucourde, Savasse (hamlet of L'Homme d'Armes), Montélimar, Malataverne, Donzère, Pierrelatte.
- Provence-Alpes-Côte d'Azur: Lapalud, Mondragon, Mornas, Piolenc, Orange, Courthézon, Bédarrides, Sorgues, Le Pontet, Avignon, Noves, Saint-Andiol, Plan-d'Orgon, Orgon, Sénas, Lambesc, Saint-Cannat, Aix-en-Provence, Châteauneuf-le-Rouge, Rousset, Pourcieux, Saint-Maximin-la-Sainte-Baume, Tourves, Brignoles, Flassans-sur-Issole, Le Luc, Le Cannet-des-Maures, Vidauban, Le Muy, Puget-sur-Argens, Fréjus, Les Adrets-de-l'Estérel, Mandelieu-la-Napoule, Cannes, Golfe Juan, Antibes, Villeneuve-Loubet, Cagnes-sur-Mer, Saint-Laurent-du-Var, Nice, Villefranche-sur-Mer, Èze, La Turbie, Beausoleil, Roquebrune-Cap-Martin, Menton.

== Village étape ==
The route is served by the following two Village étapes, Lapalisse and Varennes-sur-Allier.

== In popular history ==
- A song by Charles Trenet in 1959, Nationale 7
- A song written by Alan Tunbridge and Al Jones and recorded by Pete Stanley & Wizz Jones on Sixteen Tons of Bluegrass and by John Renbourn on his eponymous album
- Many famous restaurants, including 3-star classified by Michelin Guide.
- A museum of the Nationale 7 in Piolenc
