= Canton of Perreux =

Coordinates: 46.0215°N 4.1469°E

Perreux
- Former canton
- Interactive map of Perreux
- Country: France
- Region: Auvergne-Rhône-Alpes
- Department: Loire
- No. of communes: {{{nbcomm}}}
- Disbanded: 2015
- Area: 132.46 km^{2} (51.14 sq mi)
- Population (2012): 16,565
  - Density: 125.06/km^{2} (323.90/sq mi)

The canton of Perreux is a French former administrative division located in the department of Loire and the Rhône-Alpes region. It was disbanded following the French canton reorganisation which came into effect in March 2015. It had 16,565 inhabitants (2012).

The canton comprised the following communes:

- Combre
- Commelle-Vernay
- Le Coteau
- Coutouvre
- Montagny
- Notre-Dame-de-Boisset
- Parigny
- Perreux
- Saint-Vincent-de-Boisset

== See also ==
- Cantons of the Loire department
