= Nationale 7 =

National Route 7 or Nationale 7 may refer to:

- National Route 7, routes named "Route nationale 7", "National Route 7", or "N7" in various countries, notably:
  - Route nationale 7 (France), a famous trunk road in France connecting Paris to the Italian border, celebrated in French popular culture as a symbol of summer holidays.

== Arts and entertainment ==
- "Nationale 7", a 1955 song by Charles Trenet
- "National Seven", a 1965 song by John Renbourn from his self-titled debut album John Renbourn
- Nationale 7, a 2000 French comedy-drama film directed by Jean-Pierre Sinapi
- Nationale 7, a 1992 antique car ride attraction at Parc Astérix in France
