= Perreux =

Perreux may refer to:

== People ==
- Thierry Perreux (born 1963), a French handball player

== Places ==
- Perreux, Loire, a commune in the Loire département
- Perreux, Yonne, a former commune in the Yonne département
- Canton of Perreux, a former commune in Loire and Rhone-Alpes
- Le Perreux-sur-Marne, a commune in the Val-de-Marne département
- Saint-Perreux, a commune in the Morbihan département
