= Pinay (disambiguation) =

Pinay or Pinoy is a colloquial term for Filipina or Filipino, respectively.

It may also refer to:

- Antoine Pinay, a French politician
- Pinay, Loire, a French commune in the Loire département
- Antoine Pinoy, a gymnast who competed for France at the 1908 Summer Olympics
- Marijke Pinoy, a Belgian actress
- PNoy, a nickname of Benigno Aquino III, the president of the Philippines from 2010 to 2016
