= English folk music (1960–1969) =

== Births and deaths ==
=== Births ===
- Kathryn Tickell (1967)

=== Deaths ===
- William Kimber (1872–1961)
- Sam Larner (1878–1965)

== Recordings ==
- 1960: Singing The Fishing (Ewan MacColl)
- 1962: The Body Blow (Ewan MacColl)
- 1963: The Iron Muse (A.L. Lloyd, Ewan MacColl, Anne Briggs)
- 1964: The Fight Game (Ewan MacColl)
- 1965: John Renbourn (John Renbourn)
- 1966: Songs of a Shropshire Farm Worker (Fred Jordan)
- 1965: Frost and Fire (The Watersons)
- 1966: The Bird in the Bush (Anne Briggs, Frankie Armstrong, A.L. Lloyd)
- 1966: A Yorkshire Garland (Watersons)
- 1967: Leviathan (A.L. Lloyd)
- 1967: Nicola (Bert Jansch)
- 1968: Fairport Convention (Fairport Convention)
- 1968: What We Did on Our Holidays (Fairport Convention)
- 1968: The Pentangle (Pentangle)
- 1969: Unhalfbricking (Fairport Convention)
- 1969: Liege and Lief (Fairport Convention)

== See also ==
- Music of the United Kingdom (1960s)
