= Néronde =

- Commune
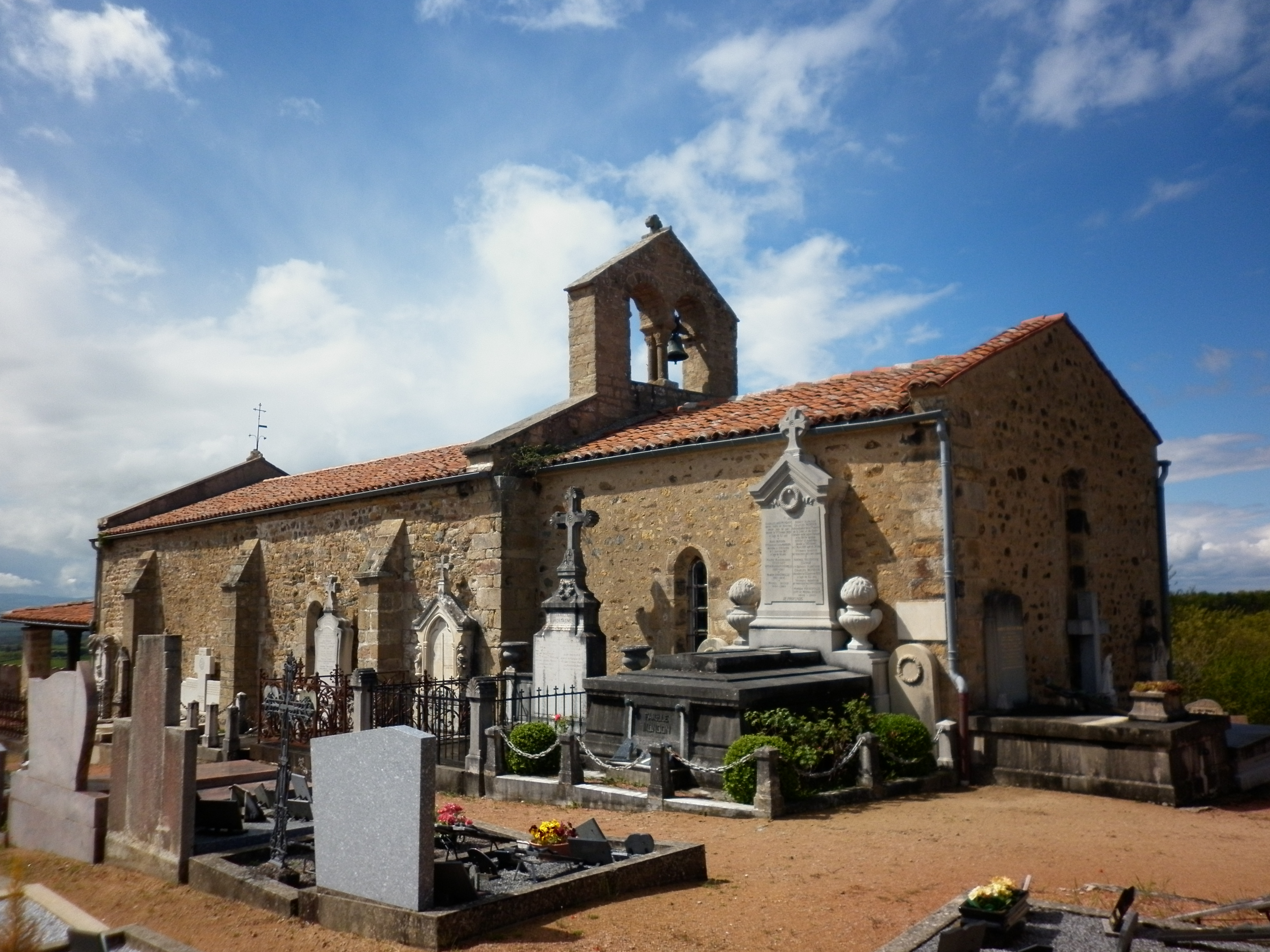

- Coat of arms
- Location of Néronde
- Location within France Location within Auvergne-Rhône-Alpes
- Coordinates: 45°50′21″N 4°14′15″E
- Country: France
- Region: Auvergne-Rhône-Alpes
- Department: Loire
- Arrondissement: Roanne
- Canton: Le Coteau
- Intercommunality: Forez-Est

Government
  - Mayor (2020–2026): Gérard Moncelon
- Area^{1}: 8.57 km^{2} (3.31 sq mi)
- Elevation: 460 m (1,510 ft)
- Highest elevation: 606 m (1,988 ft)
- Lowest elevation: 377 m (1,237 ft)
- Population (2023): 484
  - Density: 56.5/km^{2} (146/sq mi)
- Time zone: UTC+01:00 (CET)
  - Summer (DST): UTC+02:00 (CEST)
- INSEE/Postal code: 42154 /42510
- ^{1} French Land Register data, which excludes lakes, ponds, glaciers > 1 km^{2} (0.386 sq mi or 247 acres) and river estuaries.

Néronde (French pronunciation: [neʁɔ̃d]) is a commune in the Loire department in central France.

== Population ==
Historical population
Year	Pop.	±% p.a.
1968	622	—
1975	501	−3.04%
1982	431	−2.13%
1990	460	+0.82%
1999	447	−0.32%
2007	463	+0.44%
2012	477	+0.60%
2017	457	−0.85%
2023	484	+0.96%
Source: INSEE

== See also ==
- Communes of the Loire department
