= Saint-Jodard =

- Commune
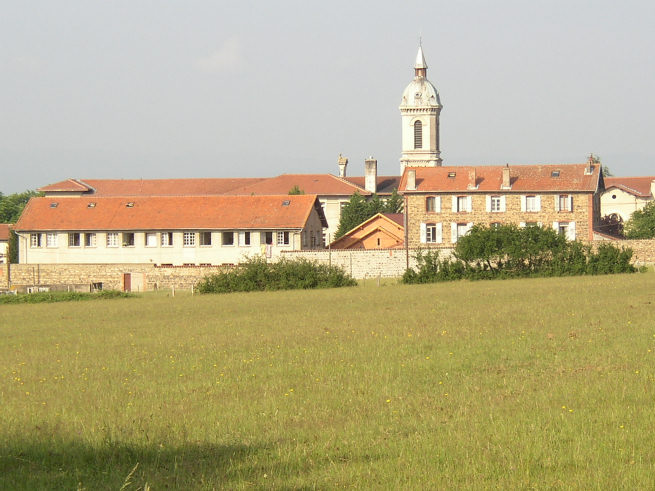

- Coat of arms
- Location of Saint-Jodard
- Location within France Location within Auvergne-Rhône-Alpes
- Coordinates: 45°52′54″N 4°07′59″E
- Country: France
- Region: Auvergne-Rhône-Alpes
- Department: Loire
- Arrondissement: Roanne
- Canton: Le Coteau

Government
  - Mayor (2020–2026): Dominique Rory
- Area^{1}: 6.65 km^{2} (2.57 sq mi)
- Elevation: 434 m (1,424 ft)
- Highest elevation: 464 m (1,522 ft)
- Lowest elevation: 300 m (980 ft)
- Population (2023): 393
  - Density: 59.1/km^{2} (153/sq mi)
- Time zone: UTC+01:00 (CET)
  - Summer (DST): UTC+02:00 (CEST)
- INSEE/Postal code: 42241 /42590
- ^{1} French Land Register data, which excludes lakes, ponds, glaciers > 1 km^{2} (0.386 sq mi or 247 acres) and river estuaries.

Saint-Jodard (French pronunciation: [sɛ̃ ʒɔdaʁ]) is a commune in the Loire department in central France.

== Population ==
Historical population
Year	Pop.	±% p.a.
1968	508	—
1975	438	−2.10%
1982	345	−3.35%
1990	421	+2.52%
1999	604	+4.09%
2007	608	+0.08%
2012	522	−3.00%
2017	414	−4.53%
2023	393	−0.86%
Source: INSEE

== See also ==
- Communes of the Loire department
