= Saint-Symphorien-de-Lay =

- Commune
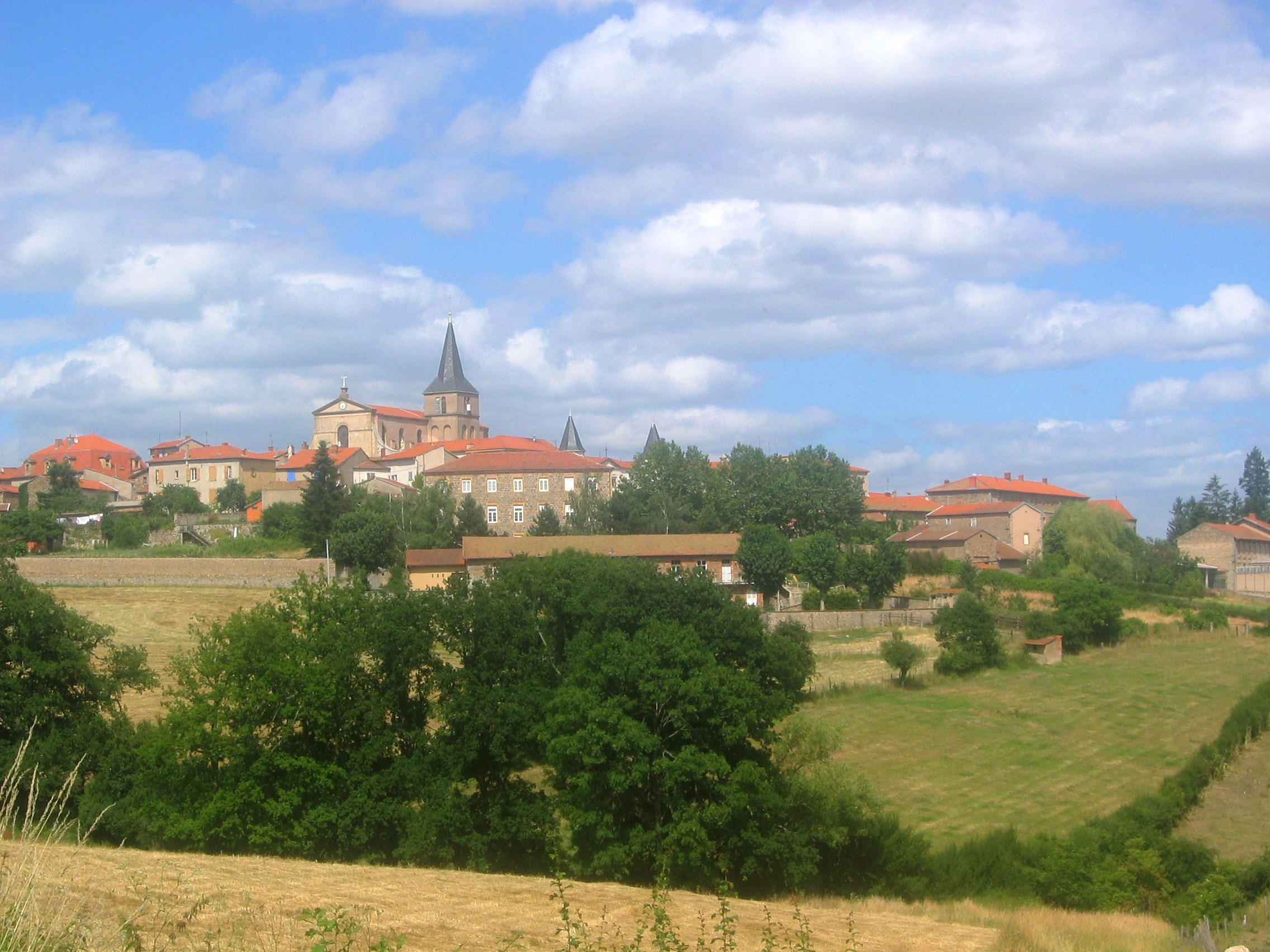

- Coat of arms
- Location of Saint-Symphorien-de-Lay
- Location within France Location within Auvergne-Rhône-Alpes
- Coordinates: 45°56′55″N 4°12′45″E
- Country: France
- Region: Auvergne-Rhône-Alpes
- Department: Loire
- Arrondissement: Roanne
- Canton: Le Coteau
- Intercommunality: Pays entre Loire et Rhône

Government
  - Mayor (2020–2026): Dominique Geay
- Area^{1}: 33.57 km^{2} (12.96 sq mi)
- Elevation: 440 m (1,440 ft)
- Highest elevation: 621 m (2,037 ft)
- Lowest elevation: 305 m (1,001 ft)
- Population (2023): 1,979
  - Density: 58.95/km^{2} (152.7/sq mi)
- Time zone: UTC+01:00 (CET)
  - Summer (DST): UTC+02:00 (CEST)
- INSEE/Postal code: 42289 /42470
- ^{1} French Land Register data, which excludes lakes, ponds, glaciers > 1 km^{2} (0.386 sq mi or 247 acres) and river estuaries.

Saint-Symphorien-de-Lay (French pronunciation: [sɛ̃ sɛ̃fɔʁjɛ̃ də lɛ], literally Saint-Symphorien of Lay) is a commune in the Loire department in the Auvergne-Rhône-Alpes region.

== Population ==
Historical population
Year	Pop.	±% p.a.
1968	1,604	—
1975	1,549	−0.50%
1982	1,544	−0.05%
1990	1,489	−0.45%
1999	1,427	−0.47%
2007	1,669	+1.98%
2012	1,877	+2.38%
2017	1,887	+0.11%
2023	1,979	+0.80%
Source: INSEE

== Personalities ==
The commune was the birthplace of Suzanne Aubert.

== See also ==
- Communes of the Loire department
