= Neulise =

- Commune
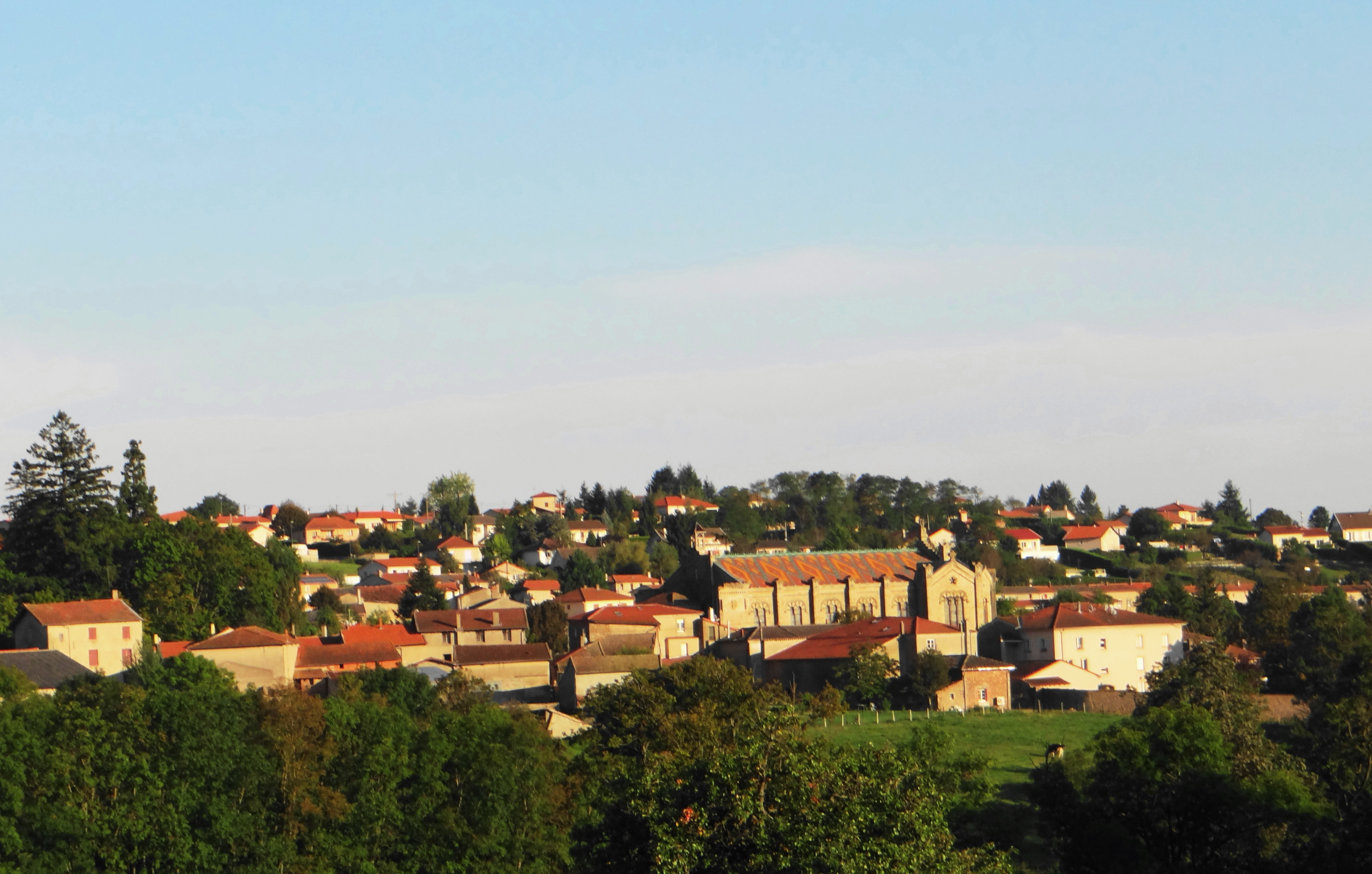

- Coat of arms
- Location of Neulise
- Location within France Location within Auvergne-Rhône-Alpes
- Coordinates: 45°54′11″N 4°10′51″E
- Country: France
- Region: Auvergne-Rhône-Alpes
- Department: Loire
- Arrondissement: Roanne
- Canton: Le Coteau
- Intercommunality: Pays entre Loire et Rhône

Government
  - Mayor (2020–2026): Hubert Roffat
- Area^{1}: 22.99 km^{2} (8.88 sq mi)
- Elevation: 555 m (1,821 ft)
- Highest elevation: 606 m (1,988 ft)
- Lowest elevation: 376 m (1,234 ft)
- Population (2023): 1,344
  - Density: 58.46/km^{2} (151.4/sq mi)
- Time zone: UTC+01:00 (CET)
  - Summer (DST): UTC+02:00 (CEST)
- INSEE/Postal code: 42156 /42590
- ^{1} French Land Register data, which excludes lakes, ponds, glaciers > 1 km^{2} (0.386 sq mi or 247 acres) and river estuaries.

Neulise (French pronunciation: [nøliz]) is a commune in the Loire department in central France.

== Population ==
Historical population
Year	Pop.	±% p.a.
1968	1,241	—
1975	1,154	−1.03%
1982	1,202	+0.58%
1990	1,153	−0.52%
1999	1,146	−0.07%
2007	1,263	+1.22%
2012	1,282	+0.30%
2017	1,366	+1.28%
2023	1,344	−0.27%
Source: INSEE

== See also ==
- Communes of the Loire department
