= Violay =

- Commune
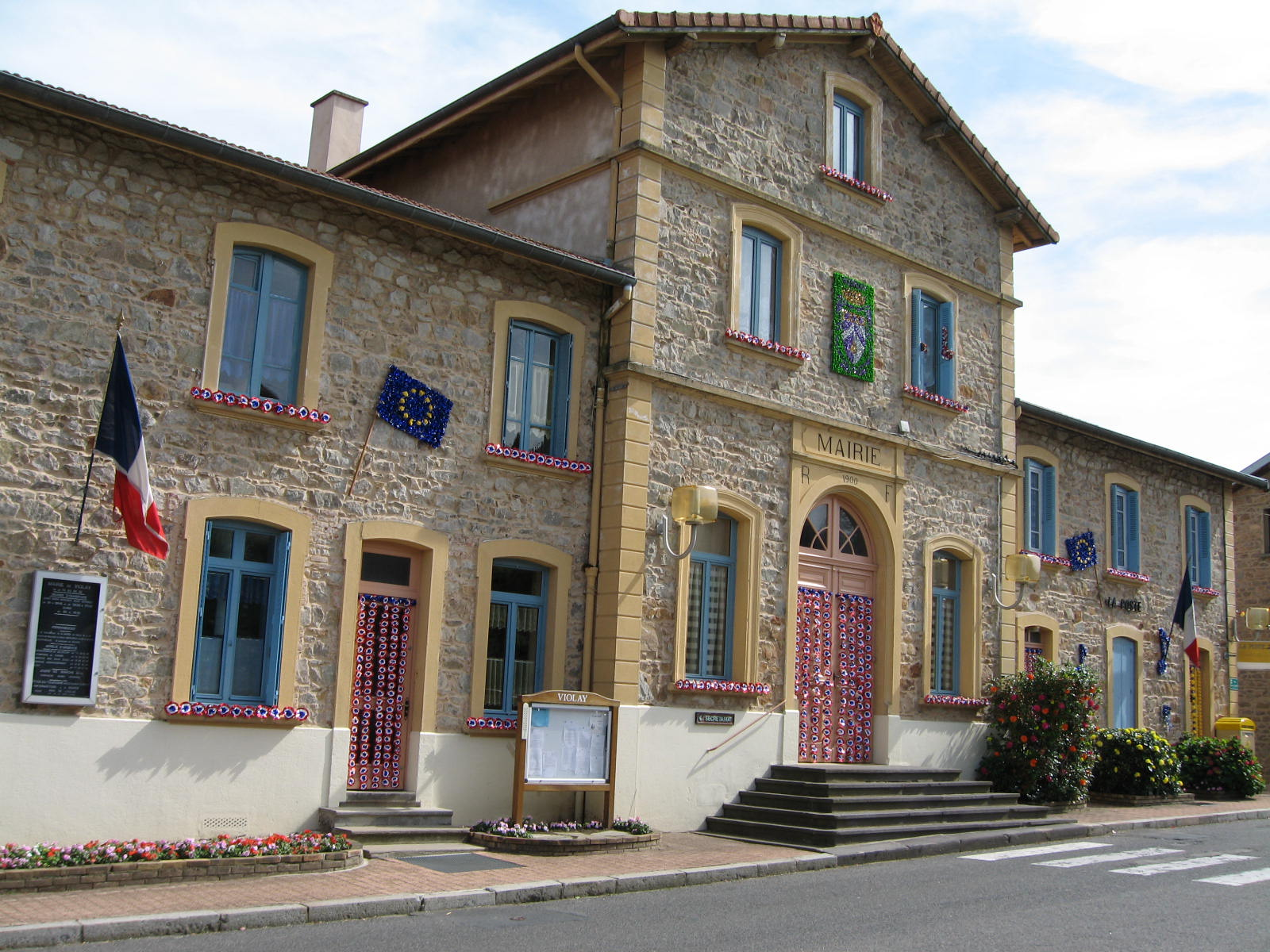
- Town hall

- Coat of arms
- Location of Violay
- Location within France Location within Auvergne-Rhône-Alpes
- Coordinates: 45°51′14″N 4°21′31″E
- Country: France
- Region: Auvergne-Rhône-Alpes
- Department: Loire
- Arrondissement: Roanne
- Canton: Le Coteau

Government
  - Mayor (2020–2026): Véronique Chaverot
- Area^{1}: 27.07 km^{2} (10.45 sq mi)
- Elevation: 830 m (2,720 ft)
- Highest elevation: 1,004 m (3,294 ft)
- Lowest elevation: 535 m (1,755 ft)
- Population (2023): 1,218
  - Density: 44.99/km^{2} (116.5/sq mi)
- Demonym: Violaysien(ne)
- Time zone: UTC+01:00 (CET)
  - Summer (DST): UTC+02:00 (CEST)
- INSEE/Postal code: 42334 /42780
- ^{1} French Land Register data, which excludes lakes, ponds, glaciers > 1 km^{2} (0.386 sq mi or 247 acres) and river estuaries.

Violay (French pronunciation: [vjɔlɛ]) is a commune in the department of Loire, Auvergne-Rhône-Alpes, France.

== Population ==
Historical population
Year	Pop.	±% p.a.
1968	1,339	—
1975	1,344	+0.05%
1982	1,380	+0.38%
1990	1,425	+0.40%
1999	1,343	−0.66%
2007	1,362	+0.18%
2012	1,317	−0.67%
2017	1,239	−1.21%
2023	1,218	−0.28%
Source: INSEE

== See also ==
- Communes of the Loire department
