= Bussières, Loire =

Bussières
- Commune
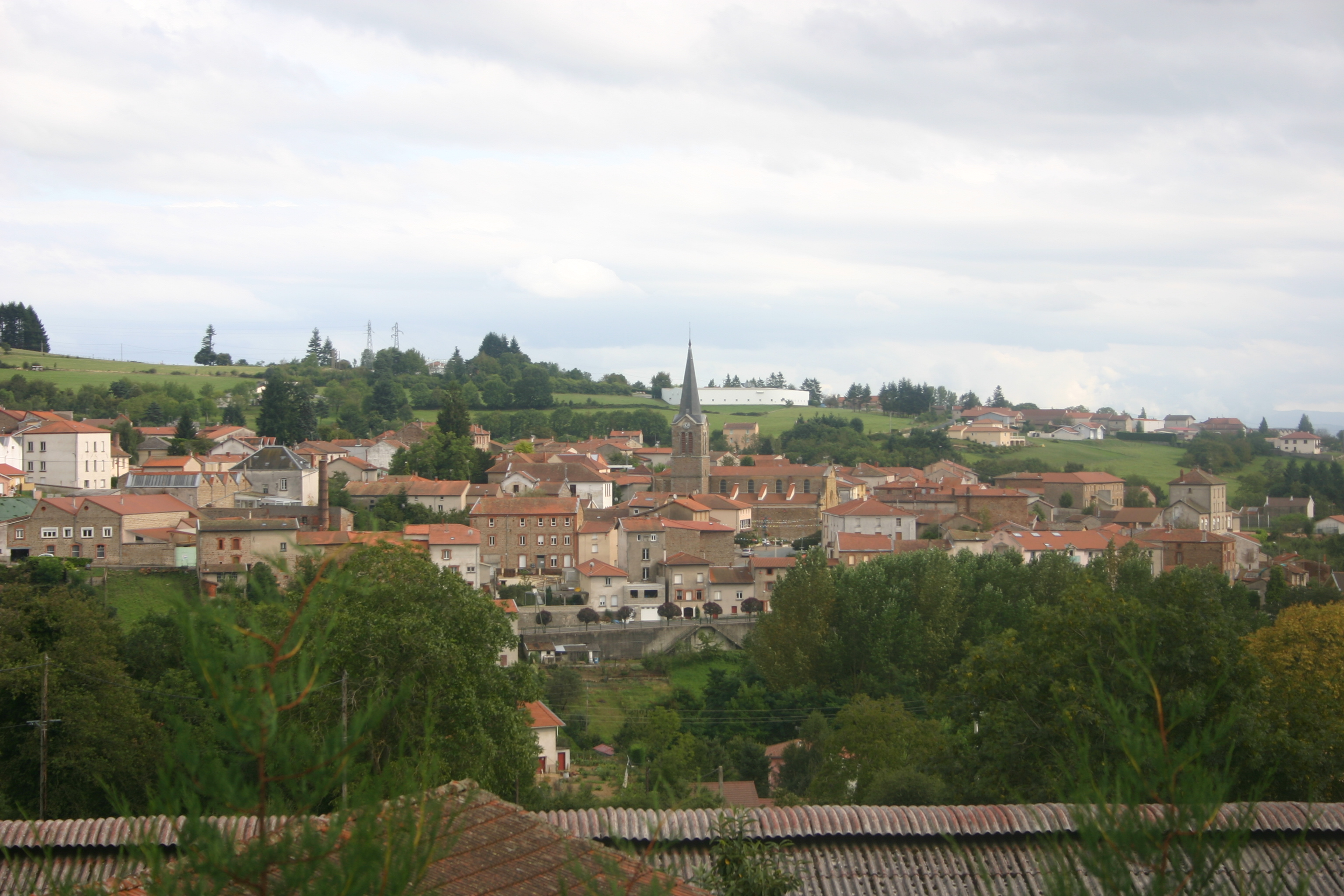

- Coat of arms
- Location of Bussières
- Location within France Location within Auvergne-Rhône-Alpes
- Coordinates: 45°50′18″N 4°16′09″E
- Country: France
- Region: Auvergne-Rhône-Alpes
- Department: Loire
- Arrondissement: Roanne
- Canton: Le Coteau

Government
  - Mayor (2020–2026): Georges Suzan
- Area^{1}: 16.76 km^{2} (6.47 sq mi)
- Elevation: 588 m (1,929 ft)
- Highest elevation: 770 m (2,530 ft)
- Lowest elevation: 458 m (1,503 ft)
- Population (2023): 1,540
  - Density: 91.9/km^{2} (238/sq mi)
- Time zone: UTC+01:00 (CET)
  - Summer (DST): UTC+02:00 (CEST)
- INSEE/Postal code: 42029 /42510
- ^{1} French Land Register data, which excludes lakes, ponds, glaciers > 1 km^{2} (0.386 sq mi or 247 acres) and river estuaries.

Bussières (French pronunciation: [bysjɛʁ]) is a commune in the Loire department in central France.

== Population ==
Historical population
Year	Pop.	±% p.a.
1968	1,628	—
1975	1,439	−1.75%
1982	1,460	+0.21%
1990	1,332	−1.14%
1999	1,302	−0.25%
2007	1,467	+1.50%
2012	1,577	+1.46%
2017	1,545	−0.41%
2023	1,540	−0.05%
Source: INSEE

== See also ==
- Communes of the Loire department
