= Croizet-sur-Gand =

- Commune
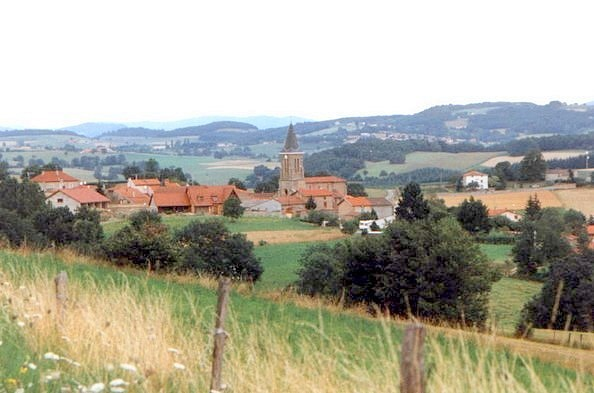
- Location of Croizet-sur-Gand
- Location within France Location within Auvergne-Rhône-Alpes
- Coordinates: 45°55′01″N 4°13′50″E
- Country: France
- Region: Auvergne-Rhône-Alpes
- Department: Loire
- Arrondissement: Roanne
- Canton: Le Coteau
- Intercommunality: Pays entre Loire et Rhône

Government
  - Mayor (2020–2026): Christian Gervais
- Area^{1}: 5.98 km^{2} (2.31 sq mi)
- Highest elevation: 578 m (1,896 ft)
- Lowest elevation: 407 m (1,335 ft)
- Population (2023): 320
  - Density: 54/km^{2} (140/sq mi)
- Time zone: UTC+01:00 (CET)
  - Summer (DST): UTC+02:00 (CEST)
- INSEE/Postal code: 42077 /42540
- ^{1} French Land Register data, which excludes lakes, ponds, glaciers > 1 km^{2} (0.386 sq mi or 247 acres) and river estuaries.

Croizet-sur-Gand (French pronunciation: [kʁwazɛ syʁ ɡɑ̃]) is a commune in the Loire department in central France.

== Population ==
Historical population
| Year | Pop. | ±% p.a. |
|---|---|---|
| 1968 | 235 | — |
| 1975 | 221 | −0.87% |
| 1982 | 218 | −0.20% |
| 1990 | 208 | −0.59% |
| 1999 | 224 | +0.83% |
| 2007 | 261 | +1.93% |
| 2012 | 310 | +3.50% |
| 2017 | 314 | +0.26% |
| 2023 | 320 | +0.32% |
Source: INSEE

== See also ==
- Communes of the Loire department
