= Chirassimont =

- Commune
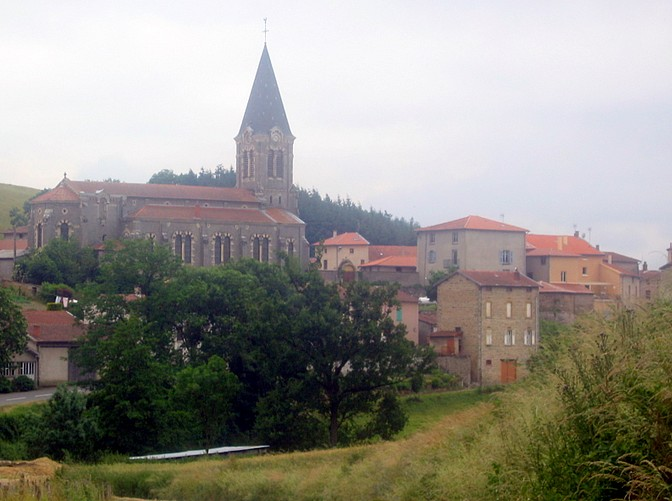
- Location of Chirassimont
- Location within France Location within Auvergne-Rhône-Alpes
- Coordinates: 45°54′52″N 4°17′10″E
- Country: France
- Region: Auvergne-Rhône-Alpes
- Department: Loire
- Arrondissement: Roanne
- Canton: Le Coteau
- Intercommunality: Pays entre Loire et Rhône

Government
  - Mayor (2020–2026): Jean-Paul Jusselme
- Area^{1}: 10.69 km^{2} (4.13 sq mi)
- Elevation: 540 m (1,770 ft)
- Highest elevation: 764 m (2,507 ft)
- Lowest elevation: 469 m (1,539 ft)
- Population (2023): 387
  - Density: 36.2/km^{2} (93.8/sq mi)
- Time zone: UTC+01:00 (CET)
  - Summer (DST): UTC+02:00 (CEST)
- INSEE/Postal code: 42063 /42114
- ^{1} French Land Register data, which excludes lakes, ponds, glaciers > 1 km^{2} (0.386 sq mi or 247 acres) and river estuaries.

Chirassimont (French pronunciation: [ʃiʁasimɔ̃]; Arpitan: Chierât-Simon) is a commune in the Loire department in central France.

== Population ==
Historical population
Year	Pop.	±% p.a.
1968	581	—
1975	516	−1.68%
1982	417	−3.00%
1990	409	−0.24%
1999	364	−1.29%
2007	373	+0.31%
2012	377	+0.21%
2017	400	+1.19%
2023	387	−0.55%
Source: INSEE

== See also ==
- Communes of the Loire department
