= Cordelle =

- Commune
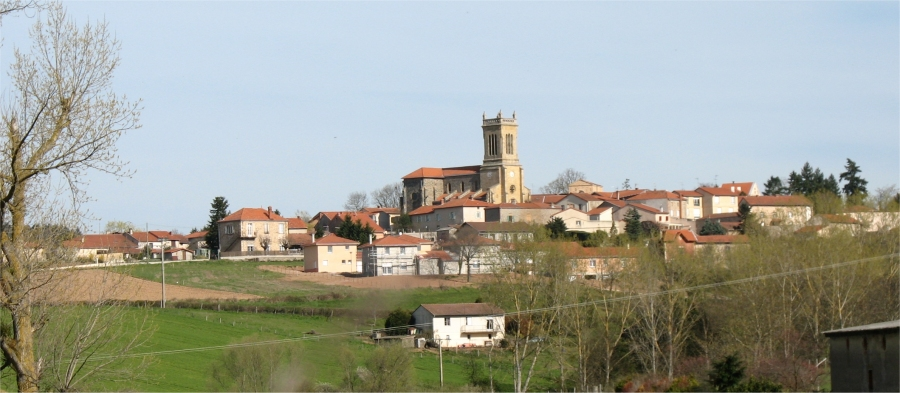

- Coat of arms
- Location of Cordelle
- Location within France Location within Auvergne-Rhône-Alpes
- Coordinates: 45°56′41″N 4°03′43″E
- Country: France
- Region: Auvergne-Rhône-Alpes
- Department: Loire
- Arrondissement: Roanne
- Canton: Le Coteau
- Intercommunality: Pays entre Loire et Rhône

Government
  - Mayor (2020–2026): Philippe Chatre
- Area^{1}: 26.64 km^{2} (10.29 sq mi)
- Elevation: 485 m (1,591 ft)
- Highest elevation: 556 m (1,824 ft)
- Lowest elevation: 280 m (920 ft)
- Population (2023): 941
  - Density: 35.3/km^{2} (91.5/sq mi)
- Time zone: UTC+01:00 (CET)
  - Summer (DST): UTC+02:00 (CEST)
- INSEE/Postal code: 42070 /42123
- ^{1} French Land Register data, which excludes lakes, ponds, glaciers > 1 km^{2} (0.386 sq mi or 247 acres) and river estuaries.

Cordelle (French pronunciation: [kɔʁdɛl]) is a commune in the Loire department in central France.

== Population ==
Historical population
Year	Pop.	±% p.a.
1968	625	—
1975	670	+1.00%
1982	702	+0.67%
1990	749	+0.81%
1999	779	+0.44%
2007	885	+1.61%
2012	895	+0.22%
2017	916	+0.46%
2023	941	+0.45%
Source: INSEE

== See also ==
- Communes of the Loire department
