= Sainte-Colombe-sur-Gand =

- Commune
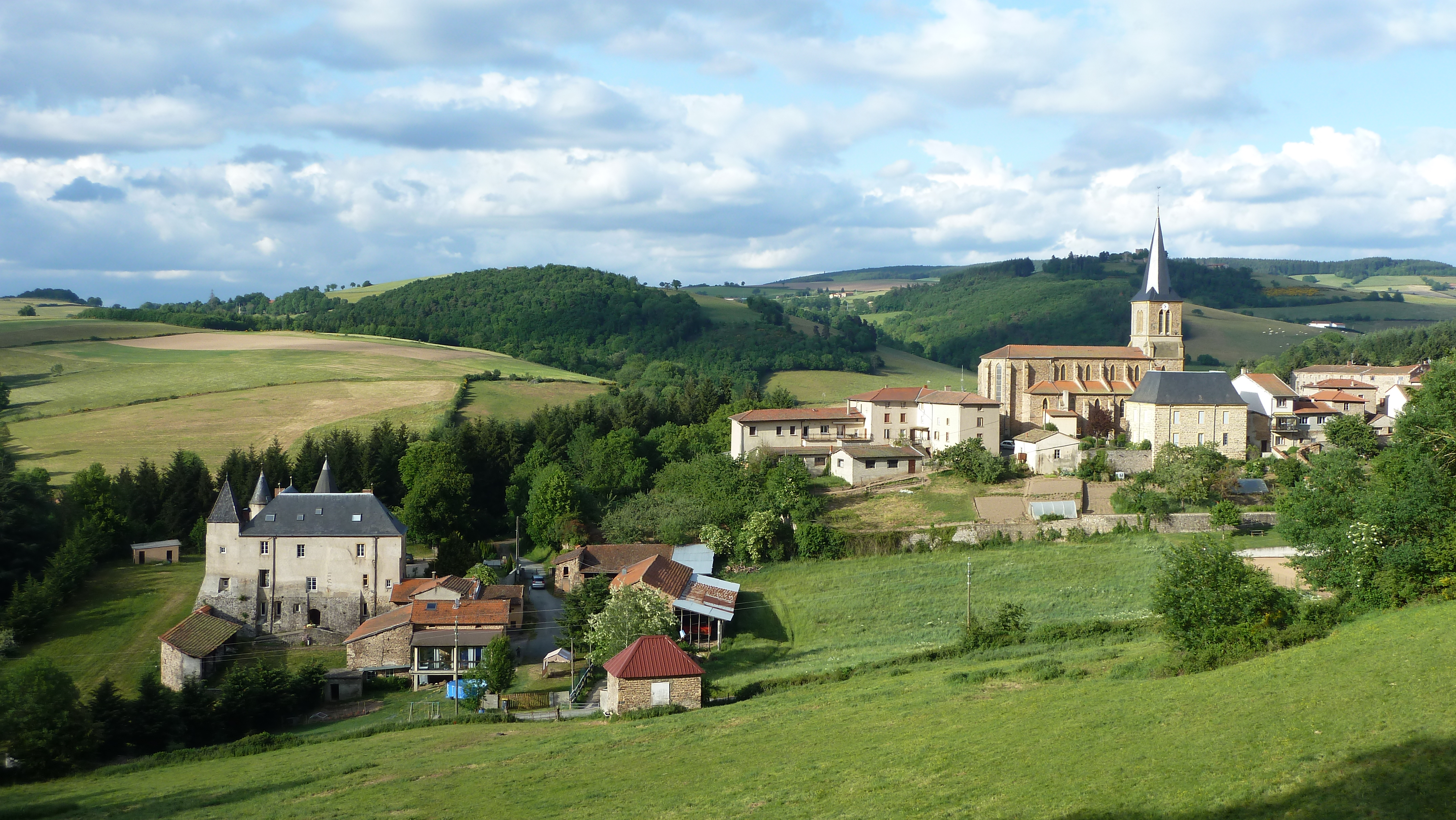
- Location of Sainte-Colombe-sur-Gand
- Location within France Location within Auvergne-Rhône-Alpes
- Coordinates: 45°52′47″N 4°16′32″E
- Country: France
- Region: Auvergne-Rhône-Alpes
- Department: Loire
- Arrondissement: Roanne
- Canton: Le Coteau

Government
  - Mayor (2020–2026): Ghislaine Dupuy
- Area^{1}: 13.56 km^{2} (5.24 sq mi)
- Elevation: 628 m (2,060 ft)
- Highest elevation: 774 m (2,539 ft)
- Lowest elevation: 468 m (1,535 ft)
- Population (2023): 384
  - Density: 28.3/km^{2} (73.3/sq mi)
- Time zone: UTC+01:00 (CET)
  - Summer (DST): UTC+02:00 (CEST)
- INSEE/Postal code: 42209 /42540
- ^{1} French Land Register data, which excludes lakes, ponds, glaciers > 1 km^{2} (0.386 sq mi or 247 acres) and river estuaries.

Sainte-Colombe-sur-Gand (French pronunciation: [sɛ̃t kɔlɔ̃b syʁ ɡɑ̃]) is a commune in the Loire department in central France.

== Population ==
Historical population
Year	Pop.	±% p.a.
1968	478	—
1975	451	−0.83%
1982	420	−1.01%
1990	437	+0.50%
1999	420	−0.44%
2007	417	−0.09%
2012	425	+0.38%
2017	408	−0.81%
2023	384	−1.01%
Source: INSEE

== Notable people ==
- Mylène Chavas (born 1998), football goalkeeper for France

== See also ==
- Communes of the Loire department
