= Sainte-Agathe-en-Donzy =

- Commune
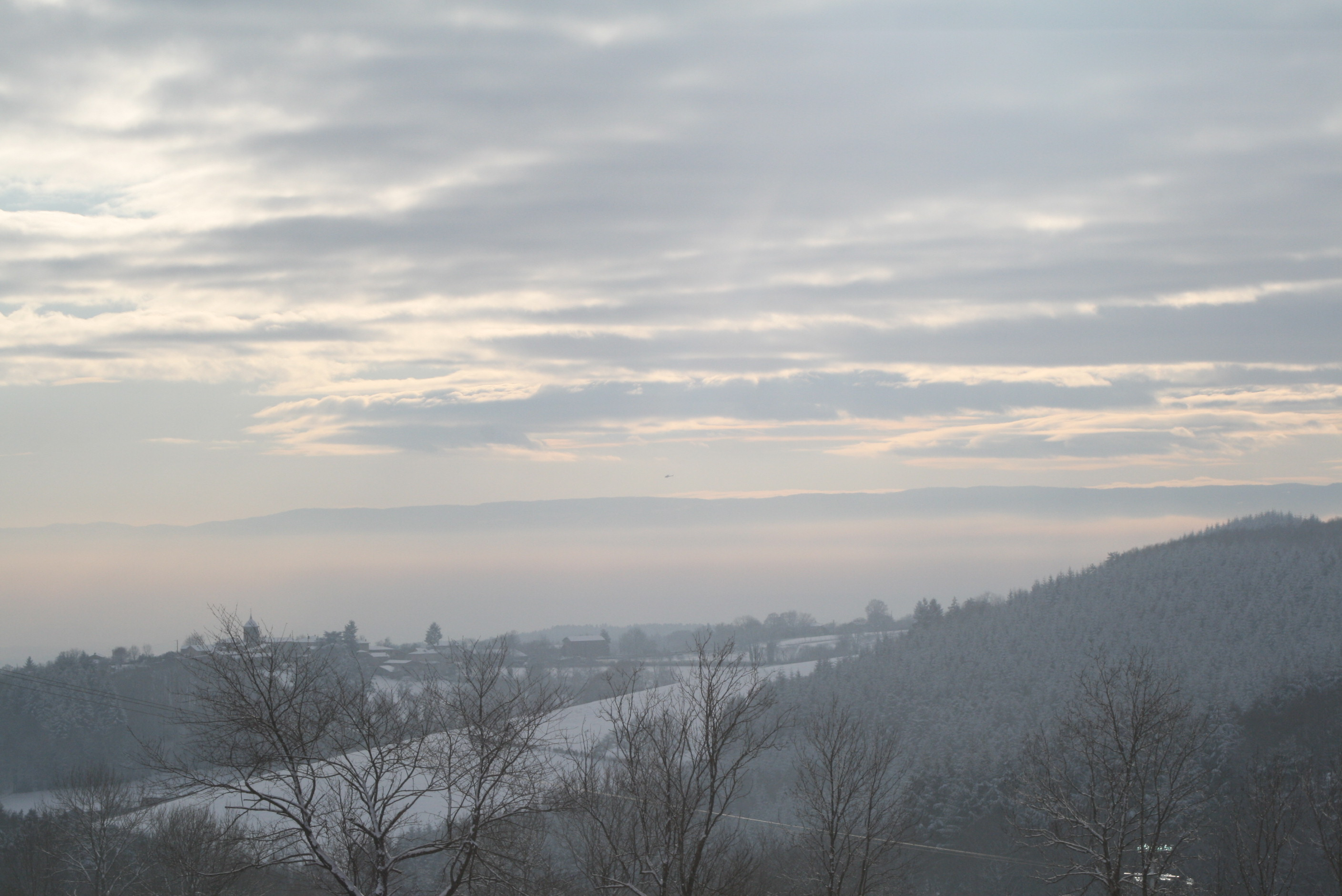

- Coat of arms
- Location of Sainte-Agathe-en-Donzy
- Location within France Location within Auvergne-Rhône-Alpes
- Coordinates: 45°50′19″N 4°18′28″E
- Country: France
- Region: Auvergne-Rhône-Alpes
- Department: Loire
- Arrondissement: Roanne
- Canton: Le Coteau

Government
  - Mayor (2020–2026): Bruno Coassy
- Area^{1}: 3.39 km^{2} (1.31 sq mi)
- Elevation: 692 m (2,270 ft)
- Highest elevation: 771 m (2,530 ft)
- Lowest elevation: 566 m (1,857 ft)
- Population (2023): 121
  - Density: 35.7/km^{2} (92.4/sq mi)
- Time zone: UTC+01:00 (CET)
  - Summer (DST): UTC+02:00 (CEST)
- INSEE/Postal code: 42196 /42510
- ^{1} French Land Register data, which excludes lakes, ponds, glaciers > 1 km^{2} (0.386 sq mi or 247 acres) and river estuaries.

Sainte-Agathe-en-Donzy (French pronunciation: [sɛ̃t aɡat ɑ̃ dɔ̃zi]) is a commune in the Loire department in central France.

== Population ==
Historical population
Year	Pop.	±% p.a.
1968	165	—
1975	146	−1.73%
1982	124	−2.31%
1990	118	−0.62%
1999	117	−0.09%
2007	122	+0.52%
2012	113	−1.52%
2017	129	+2.68%
2023	121	−1.06%
Source: INSEE

== See also ==
- Communes of the Loire department
