= Vendranges =

- Commune
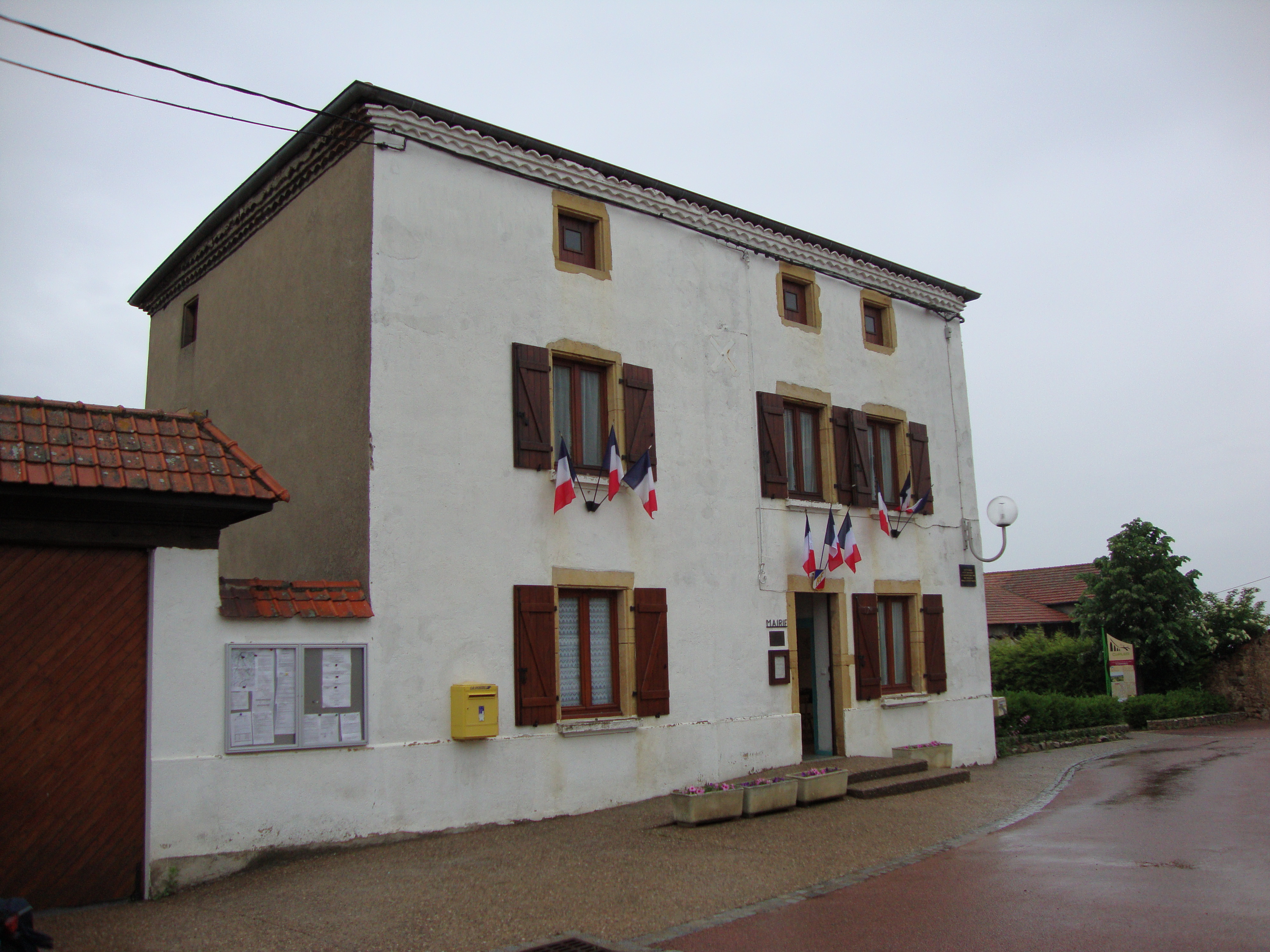
- Town hall

- Coat of arms
- Location of Vendranges
- Location within France Location within Auvergne-Rhône-Alpes
- Coordinates: 45°56′32″N 4°08′14″E
- Country: France
- Region: Auvergne-Rhône-Alpes
- Department: Loire
- Arrondissement: Roanne
- Canton: Le Coteau
- Intercommunality: Pays entre Loire et Rhône

Government
  - Mayor (2020–2026): Pascal Bert
- Area^{1}: 11.14 km^{2} (4.30 sq mi)
- Elevation: 490 m (1,610 ft)
- Highest elevation: 562 m (1,844 ft)
- Lowest elevation: 305 m (1,001 ft)
- Population (2023): 390
  - Density: 35/km^{2} (91/sq mi)
- Time zone: UTC+01:00 (CET)
  - Summer (DST): UTC+02:00 (CEST)
- INSEE/Postal code: 42325 /42590
- ^{1} French Land Register data, which excludes lakes, ponds, glaciers > 1 km^{2} (0.386 sq mi or 247 acres) and river estuaries.

Vendranges (French pronunciation: [vɑ̃dʁɑ̃ʒ]) is a commune in the Loire department in central France.

== Population ==
Historical population
| Year | Pop. | ±% p.a. |
|---|---|---|
| 1968 | 223 | — |
| 1975 | 201 | −1.47% |
| 1982 | 205 | +0.28% |
| 1990 | 226 | +1.23% |
| 1999 | 237 | +0.53% |
| 2007 | 279 | +2.06% |
| 2012 | 340 | +4.03% |
| 2017 | 371 | +1.76% |
| 2023 | 390 | +0.84% |
Source: INSEE

== Notable person ==
- Louis-Antoine Ranvier (1835–1922), physician, pathologist, anatomist and histologist, died in Vendranges.

== See also ==
- Communes of the Loire department
