= Saint-Marcel-de-Félines =

- Commune
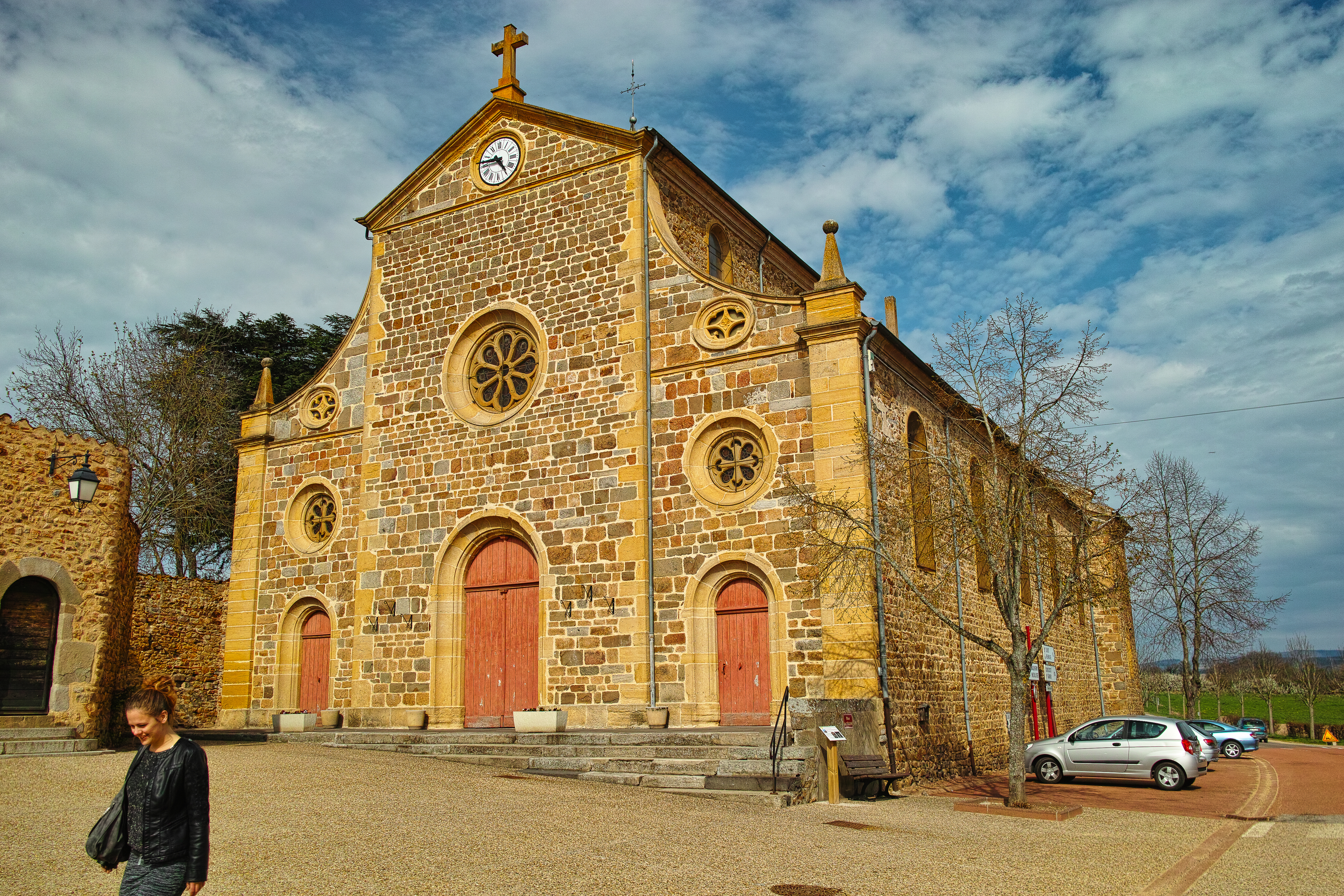

- Coat of arms
- Location of Saint-Marcel-de-Félines
- Location within France Location within Auvergne-Rhône-Alpes
- Coordinates: 45°52′09″N 4°11′32″E
- Country: France
- Region: Auvergne-Rhône-Alpes
- Department: Loire
- Arrondissement: Roanne
- Canton: Le Coteau

Government
  - Mayor (2020–2026): Frédéric Lafougère
- Area^{1}: 22.43 km^{2} (8.66 sq mi)
- Elevation: 490 m (1,610 ft)
- Highest elevation: 524 m (1,719 ft)
- Lowest elevation: 311 m (1,020 ft)
- Population (2023): 827
  - Density: 36.9/km^{2} (95.5/sq mi)
- Time zone: UTC+01:00 (CET)
  - Summer (DST): UTC+02:00 (CEST)
- INSEE/Postal code: 42254 /42122
- ^{1} French Land Register data, which excludes lakes, ponds, glaciers > 1 km^{2} (0.386 sq mi or 247 acres) and river estuaries.

Saint-Marcel-de-Félines (French pronunciation: [sɛ̃ maʁsɛl də felin]) is a commune in the Loire department in central France.

== Population ==
Historical population
Year	Pop.	±% p.a.
1968	667	—
1975	603	−1.43%
1982	608	+0.12%
1990	700	+1.78%
1999	691	−0.14%
2007	754	+1.10%
2012	805	+1.32%
2017	809	+0.10%
2023	827	+0.37%
Source: INSEE

== See also ==
- Communes of the Loire department
