= Commelle-Vernay =

- Commune
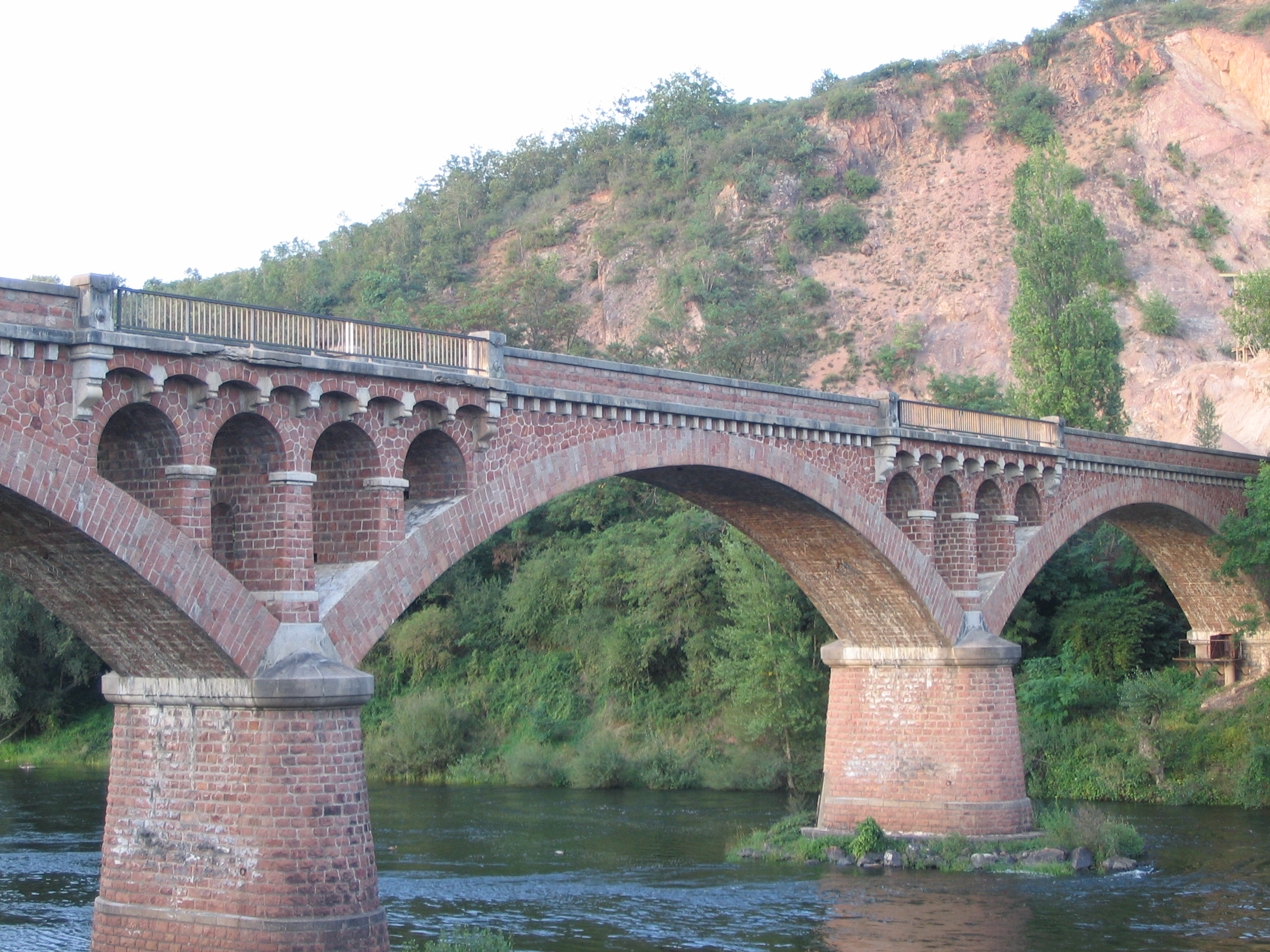

- Coat of arms
- Location of Commelle-Vernay
- Location within France Location within Auvergne-Rhône-Alpes
- Coordinates: 45°59′42″N 4°04′01″E
- Country: France
- Region: Auvergne-Rhône-Alpes
- Department: Loire
- Arrondissement: Roanne
- Canton: Le Coteau
- Intercommunality: Roannais Agglomération

Government
  - Mayor (2020–2026): Daniel Fréchet
- Area^{1}: 12.41 km^{2} (4.79 sq mi)
- Elevation: 340 m (1,120 ft)
- Highest elevation: 446 m (1,463 ft)
- Lowest elevation: 265 m (869 ft)
- Population (2023): 3,050
  - Density: 246/km^{2} (637/sq mi)
- Time zone: UTC+01:00 (CET)
  - Summer (DST): UTC+02:00 (CEST)
- INSEE/Postal code: 42069 /42120
- ^{1} French Land Register data, which excludes lakes, ponds, glaciers > 1 km^{2} (0.386 sq mi or 247 acres) and river estuaries.

Commelle-Vernay (French pronunciation: [kɔmɛl vɛʁnɛ]; Arpitan: Comèles-Vèrnê) is a commune in the Loire department in central France.

== Population ==
Historical population

| Year | Pop. | ±% p.a. |
|---|---|---|
| 1793 | 300 | — |
| 1821 | 311 | +0.13% |
| 1846 | 602 | +2.68% |
| 1872 | 695 | +0.55% |
| 1901 | 662 | −0.17% |
| 1926 | 535 | −0.85% |
| 1946 | 536 | +0.01% |
| 1962 | 836 | +2.82% |
| 1968 | 912 | +1.46% |

| Year | Pop. | ±% p.a. |
|---|---|---|
| 1975 | 1,382 | +6.12% |
| 1982 | 2,502 | +8.85% |
| 1990 | 2,872 | +1.74% |
| 1999 | 2,792 | −0.31% |
| 2007 | 2,828 | +0.16% |
| 2012 | 2,802 | −0.18% |
| 2017 | 2,955 | +1.07% |
| 2023 | 3,050 | +0.53% |

Source: EHESS and INSEE (1968-2023)

== See also ==
- Communes of the Loire department
