= Canton of Le Coteau =

Coordinates: 46.02°N 4.09°E

- Canton
- Situation of the canton of Le Coteau in the department of Loire
- Country: France
- Region: Auvergne-Rhône-Alpes
- Department: Loire
- No. of communes: {{{nbcomm}}}
- Population (2023): 33,244
- INSEE code: 4204

The canton of Le Coteau is an administrative division of the Loire department, in eastern France. It was created at the French canton reorganisation which came into effect in March 2015. Its seat is in Le Coteau.

It consists of the following communes:

1. Balbigny
2. Bussières
3. Chirassimont
4. Commelle-Vernay
5. Cordelle
6. Le Coteau
7. Croizet-sur-Gand
8. Fourneaux
9. Lay
10. Machézal
11. Neaux
12. Néronde
13. Neulise
14. Notre-Dame-de-Boisset
15. Parigny
16. Perreux
17. Pinay
18. Saint-Cyr-de-Favières
19. Saint-Cyr-de-Valorges
20. Sainte-Agathe-en-Donzy
21. Sainte-Colombe-sur-Gand
22. Saint-Jodard
23. Saint-Just-la-Pendue
24. Saint-Marcel-de-Félines
25. Saint-Priest-la-Roche
26. Saint-Symphorien-de-Lay
27. Saint-Vincent-de-Boisset
28. Vendranges
29. Violay
