= Saint-Just-la-Pendue =

- Commune
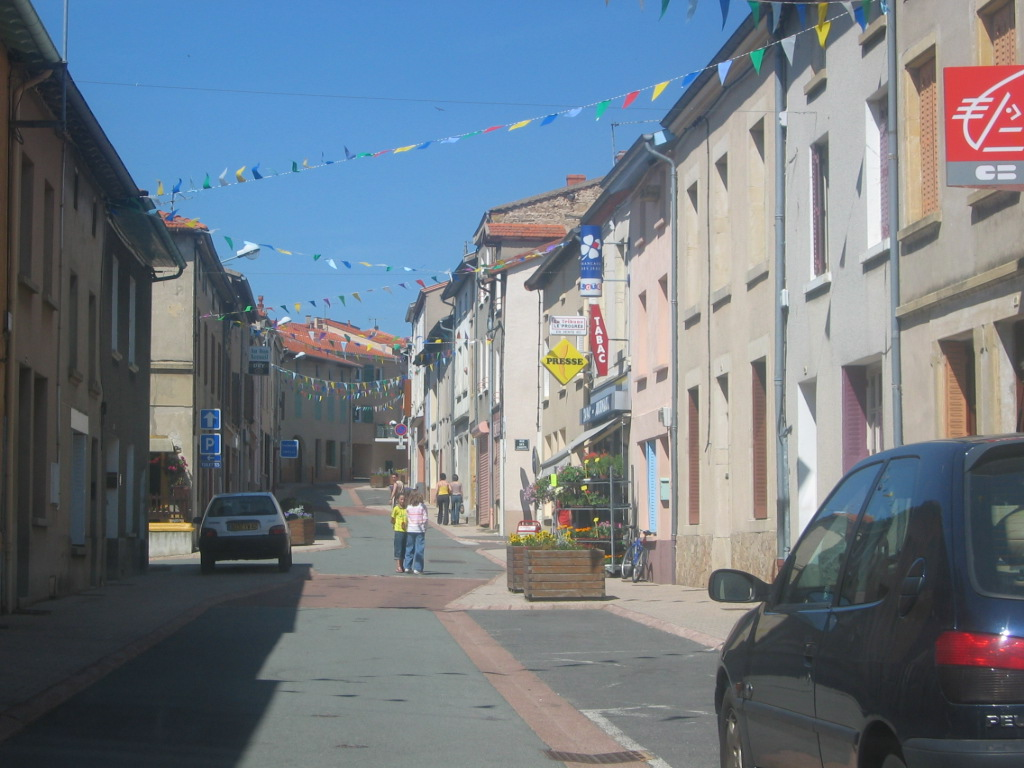

- Coat of arms
- Location of Saint-Just-la-Pendue
- Location within France Location within Auvergne-Rhône-Alpes
- Coordinates: 45°53′42″N 4°14′38″E
- Country: France
- Region: Auvergne-Rhône-Alpes
- Department: Loire
- Arrondissement: Roanne
- Canton: Le Coteau
- Intercommunality: Pays entre Loire et Rhône

Government
  - Mayor (2020–2026): Romain Coquard
- Area^{1}: 19.88 km^{2} (7.68 sq mi)
- Elevation: 590 m (1,940 ft)
- Highest elevation: 637 m (2,090 ft)
- Lowest elevation: 428 m (1,404 ft)
- Population (2023): 1,635
  - Density: 82.24/km^{2} (213.0/sq mi)
- Time zone: UTC+01:00 (CET)
  - Summer (DST): UTC+02:00 (CEST)
- INSEE/Postal code: 42249 /42540
- ^{1} French Land Register data, which excludes lakes, ponds, glaciers > 1 km^{2} (0.386 sq mi or 247 acres) and river estuaries.

Saint-Just-la-Pendue (French pronunciation: [sɛ̃ ʒy(st) la pɑ̃dy]; Arpitan: Sant-Just-la-Pendua) is a commune in the Loire department in central France.

== Name ==
The name of the commune dates from the 11th century and is recorded in the documents of Savigny Abbey, Rhône. The qualifying name la Pendue stems from an oral tradition of a woman hanged for adultery, who, after four days, fell to the ground alive, a proof of her innocence. Supposedly the location of the execution, a local wood also bears the name la Pendue.

== Population ==
Historical population
Year	Pop.	±% p.a.
1968	1,810	—
1975	1,731	−0.64%
1982	1,656	−0.63%
1990	1,466	−1.51%
1999	1,420	−0.35%
2007	1,523	+0.88%
2012	1,635	+1.43%
2017	1,642	+0.09%
2023	1,635	−0.07%
Source: INSEE

== Personalities ==
- Georges Guillard, organist and musicologist
- Jean Dupuis, trader and explorer

== See also ==
- Communes of the Loire department
