= Saint-Cyr-de-Valorges =

- Commune
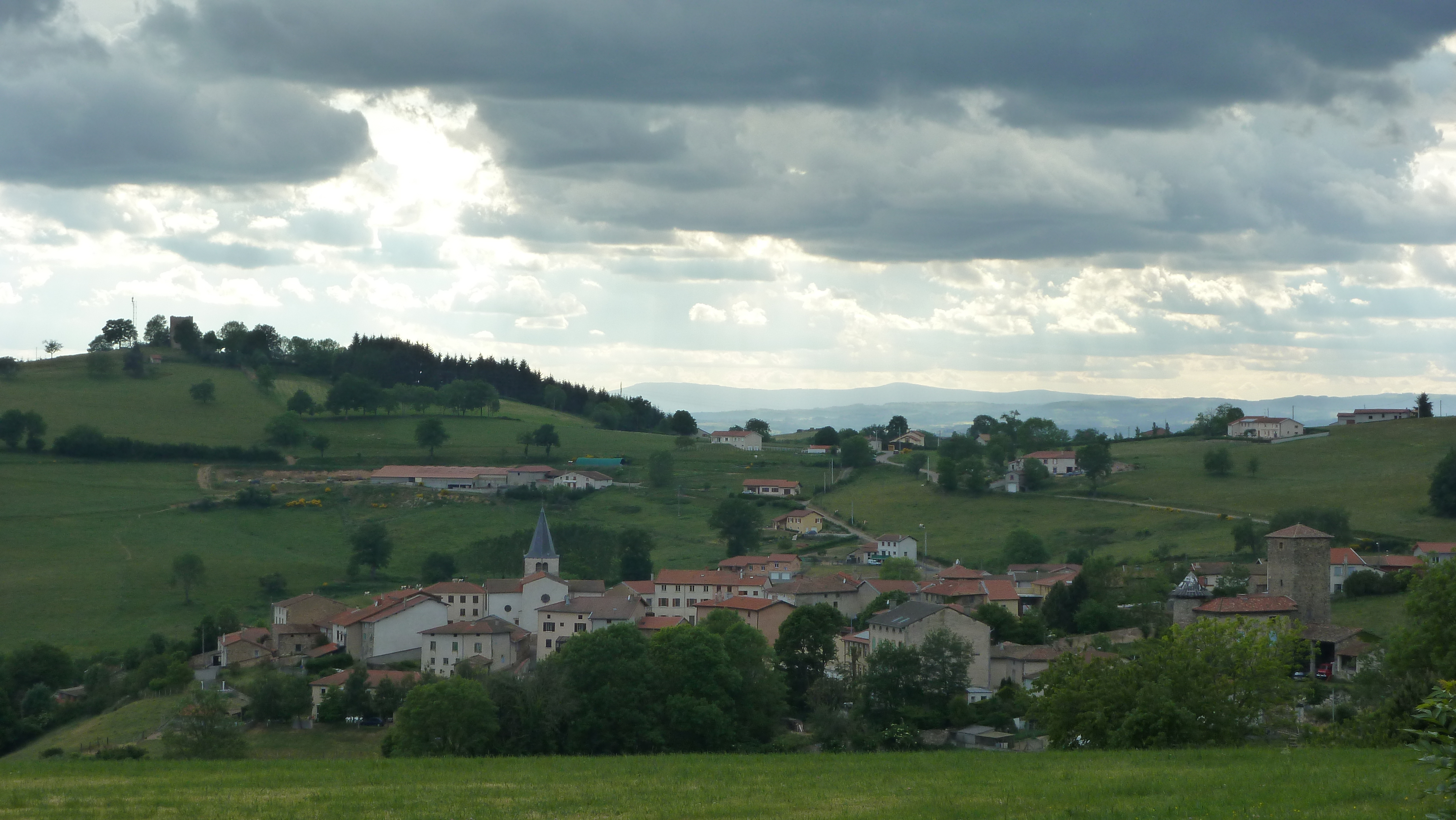
- Location of Saint-Cyr-de-Valorges
- Location within France Location within Auvergne-Rhône-Alpes
- Coordinates: 45°53′32″N 4°18′25″E
- Country: France
- Region: Auvergne-Rhône-Alpes
- Department: Loire
- Arrondissement: Roanne
- Canton: Le Coteau

Government
  - Mayor (2020–2026): Gilbert Grataloup
- Area^{1}: 9.91 km^{2} (3.83 sq mi)
- Elevation: 640 m (2,100 ft)
- Highest elevation: 892 m (2,927 ft)
- Lowest elevation: 526 m (1,726 ft)
- Population (2023): 304
  - Density: 30.7/km^{2} (79.5/sq mi)
- Time zone: UTC+01:00 (CET)
  - Summer (DST): UTC+02:00 (CEST)
- INSEE/Postal code: 42213 /42114
- ^{1} French Land Register data, which excludes lakes, ponds, glaciers > 1 km^{2} (0.386 sq mi or 247 acres) and river estuaries.

Saint-Cyr-de-Valorges (French pronunciation: [sɛ̃ siʁ də valɔʁʒ]) is a commune in the Loire department in central France.

== Population ==
Historical population
Year	Pop.	±% p.a.
1968	383	—
1975	358	−0.96%
1982	313	−1.90%
1990	277	−1.52%
1999	274	−0.12%
2007	340	+2.73%
2012	339	−0.06%
2017	304	−2.16%
2023	304	+0.00%
Source: INSEE

== See also ==
- Communes of the Loire department
