= Saint-Priest-la-Roche =

- Commune
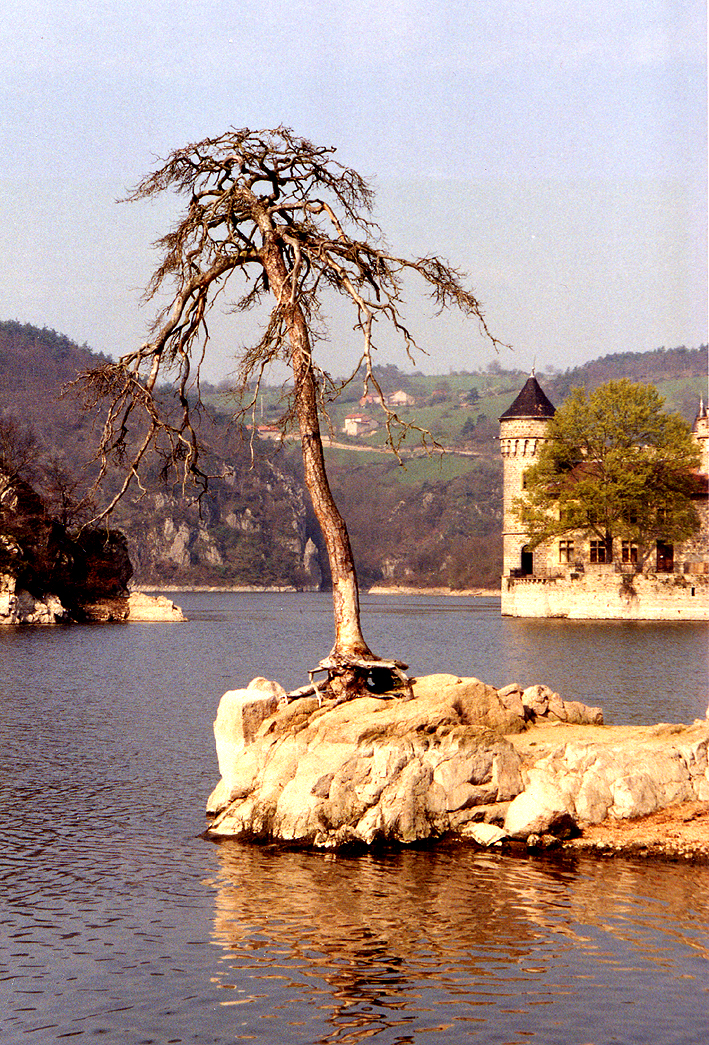
- Château de La Roche
- Location of Saint-Priest-la-Roche
- Location within France Location within Auvergne-Rhône-Alpes
- Coordinates: 45°54′49″N 4°05′40″E
- Country: France
- Region: Auvergne-Rhône-Alpes
- Department: Loire
- Arrondissement: Roanne
- Canton: Le Coteau
- Intercommunality: Pays entre Loire et Rhône

Government
  - Mayor (2024–2026): Gérald Perrin
- Area^{1}: 13.5 km^{2} (5.2 sq mi)
- Elevation: 434 m (1,424 ft)
- Highest elevation: 535 m (1,755 ft)
- Lowest elevation: 290 m (950 ft)
- Population (2023): 341
  - Density: 25.3/km^{2} (65.4/sq mi)
- Time zone: UTC+01:00 (CET)
  - Summer (DST): UTC+02:00 (CEST)
- INSEE/Postal code: 42277 /42590
- ^{1} French Land Register data, which excludes lakes, ponds, glaciers > 1 km^{2} (0.386 sq mi or 247 acres) and river estuaries.

Saint-Priest-la-Roche (French pronunciation: [sɛ̃ pʁijɛ(st) la ʁɔʃ]) is a commune in the Loire department in central France.

== Population ==
Historical population
Year	Pop.	±% p.a.
1968	300	—
1975	285	−0.73%
1982	285	+0.00%
1990	285	+0.00%
1999	274	−0.44%
2007	286	+0.54%
2012	335	+3.21%
2017	350	+0.88%
2023	341	−0.43%
Source: INSEE

== Amenities ==
There are two chambres d'hôtes in the village.

== See also ==
- Communes of the Loire department
