= Notre-Dame-de-Boisset =

- Commune
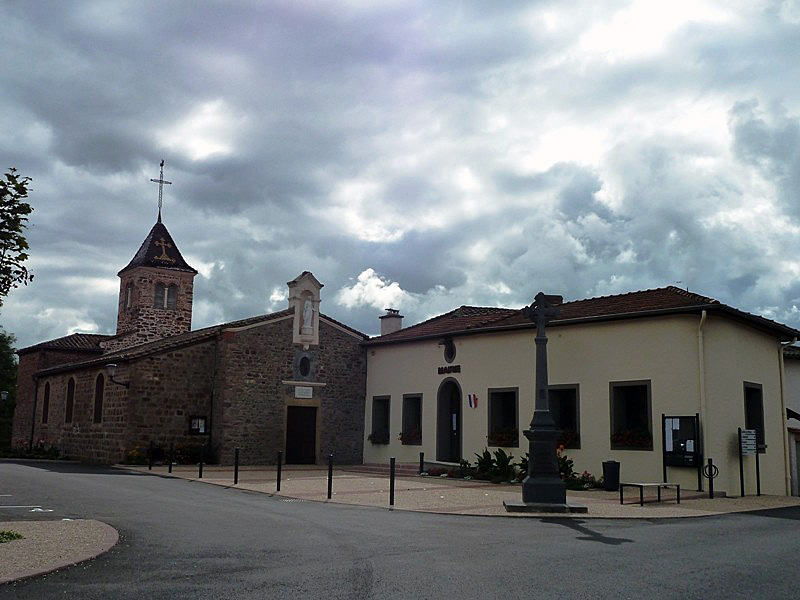
- Notre-Dame-de-Boisset Town hall
- Location of Notre-Dame-de-Boisset
- Location within France Location within Auvergne-Rhône-Alpes
- Coordinates: 45°59′42″N 4°07′47″E
- Country: France
- Region: Auvergne-Rhône-Alpes
- Department: Loire
- Arrondissement: Roanne
- Canton: Le Coteau
- Intercommunality: Roannais Agglomération

Government
  - Mayor (2020–2026): David Dozance
- Area^{1}: 9.1 km^{2} (3.5 sq mi)
- Elevation: 300 m (980 ft)
- Highest elevation: 414 m (1,358 ft)
- Lowest elevation: 278 m (912 ft)
- Population (2023): 571
  - Density: 63/km^{2} (160/sq mi)
- Time zone: UTC+01:00 (CET)
  - Summer (DST): UTC+02:00 (CEST)
- INSEE/Postal code: 42161 /42120
- ^{1} French Land Register data, which excludes lakes, ponds, glaciers > 1 km^{2} (0.386 sq mi or 247 acres) and river estuaries.

Notre-Dame-de-Boisset (French pronunciation: [nɔtʁ dam də bwasɛ]) is a commune in the Loire department in central France.

== Population ==
Historical population
Year	Pop.	±% p.a.
1968	232	—
1975	259	+1.59%
1982	329	+3.48%
1990	404	+2.60%
1999	510	+2.62%
2007	532	+0.53%
2012	548	+0.59%
2017	566	+0.65%
2023	571	+0.15%
Source: INSEE

== See also ==
- Communes of the Loire department
