= Le Coteau =

- Commune
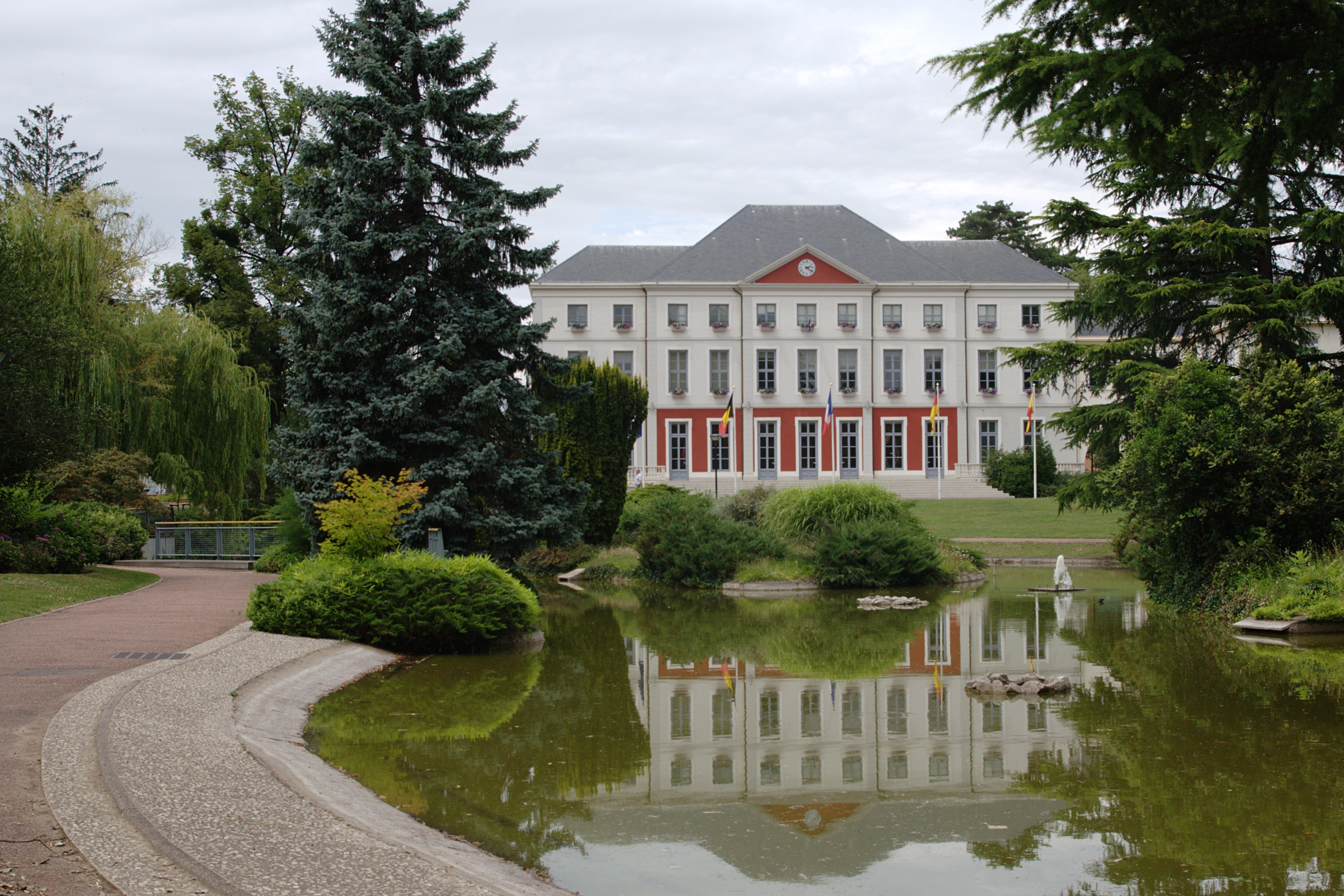
- Town hall

- Coat of arms
- Location of Le Coteau
- Location within France Location within Auvergne-Rhône-Alpes
- Coordinates: 46°01′41″N 4°05′15″E
- Country: France
- Region: Auvergne-Rhône-Alpes
- Department: Loire
- Arrondissement: Roanne
- Canton: Le Coteau
- Intercommunality: Roannais Agglomération

Government
  - Mayor (2020–2026): Sandra Creuzet
- Area^{1}: 4.89 km^{2} (1.89 sq mi)
- Elevation: 278 m (912 ft)
- Highest elevation: 317 m (1,040 ft)
- Lowest elevation: 265 m (869 ft)
- Population (2023): 6,845
  - Density: 1,400/km^{2} (3,630/sq mi)
- Time zone: UTC+01:00 (CET)
  - Summer (DST): UTC+02:00 (CEST)
- INSEE/Postal code: 42071 /42120
- ^{1} French Land Register data, which excludes lakes, ponds, glaciers > 1 km^{2} (0.386 sq mi or 247 acres) and river estuaries.

Le Coteau (French pronunciation: [lə kɔto]) is a commune in the Loire department in central France.

It lies about 90 km (56 mi) northwest of Lyon on the right bank of the river Loire, opposite the larger town Roanne.

== Population ==
Historical population

Year	Pop.	±% p.a.
1846	1,534	—
1851	1,678	+1.81%
1856	1,817	+1.60%
1861	2,032	+2.26%
1866	2,493	+4.17%
1872	2,565	+0.48%
1876	2,447	−1.17%
1881	2,621	+1.38%
1886	2,780	+1.18%
1891	3,092	+2.15%
1896	3,714	+3.73%
1901	4,462	+3.74%
1906	4,590	+0.57%
1911	4,624	+0.15%
1921	5,113	+1.01%

Year	Pop.	±% p.a.
1926	5,365	+0.97%
1931	5,500	+0.50%
1936	5,626	+0.45%
1946	6,143	+0.88%
1954	6,222	+0.16%
1962	6,571	+0.68%
1968	7,613	+2.48%
1975	8,488	+1.57%
1982	8,359	−0.22%
1990	7,469	−1.40%
1999	7,375	−0.14%
2007	7,040	−0.58%
2012	6,815	−0.65%
2017	6,872	+0.17%
2023	6,845	−0.07%

Source: EHESS and INSEE (1968-2023)

== Twin towns ==
Le Coteau is twinned with:

- Zwevegem, Belgium, since 1966
- Lorsch, Germany, since 1967
- Espalion, France, since 1998
- Marchamalo, Spain, since 2007

== See also ==
- Communes of the Loire department
