= Saint-Vincent-de-Boisset =

- Commune
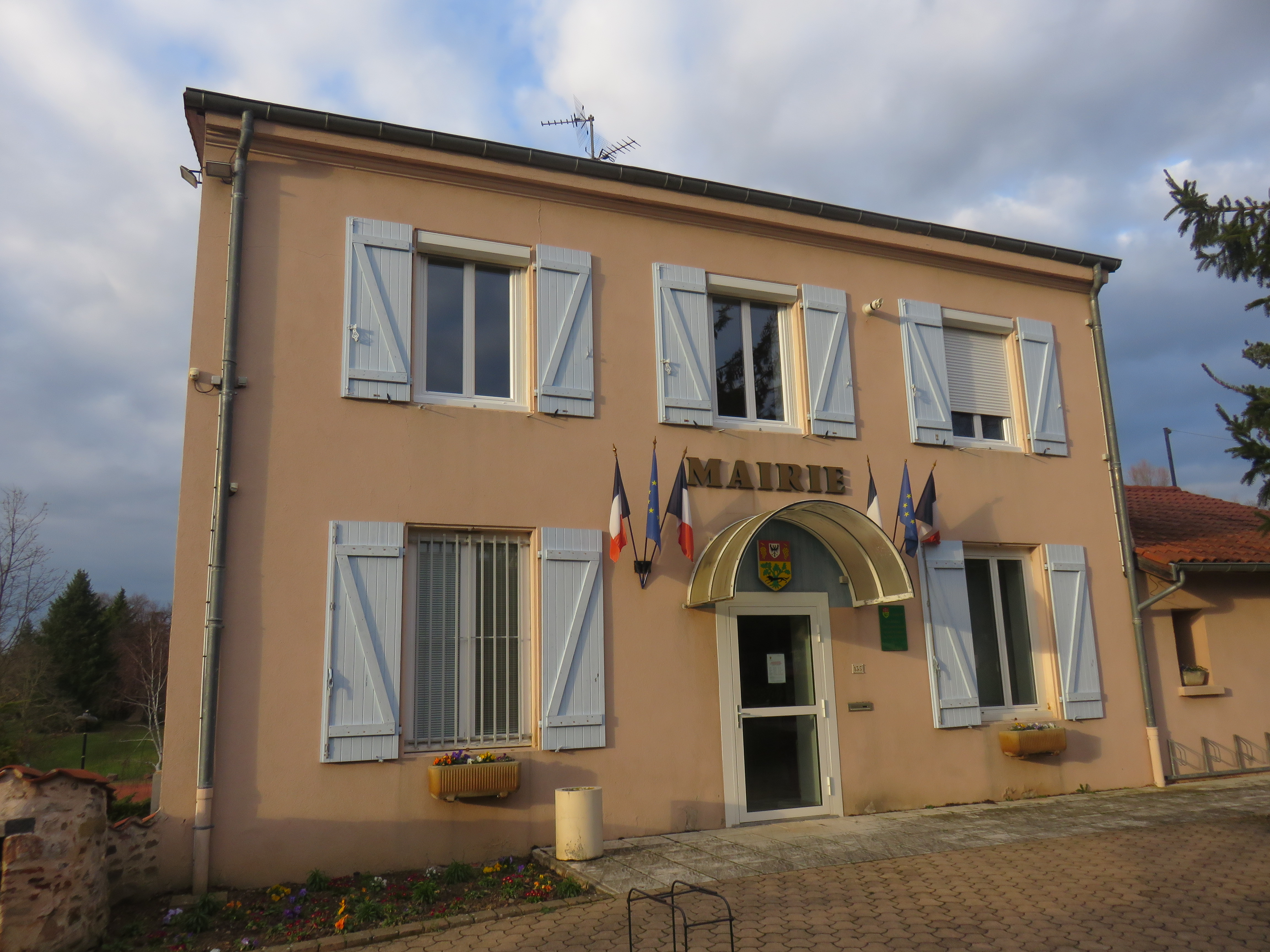
- Town hall

- Coat of arms
- Location of Saint-Vincent-de-Boisset
- Location within France Location within Auvergne-Rhône-Alpes
- Coordinates: 46°00′28″N 4°07′23″E
- Country: France
- Region: Auvergne-Rhône-Alpes
- Department: Loire
- Arrondissement: Roanne
- Canton: Le Coteau
- Intercommunality: Roannais Agglomération

Government
  - Mayor (2020–2026): Hervé Daval
- Area^{1}: 4.11 km^{2} (1.59 sq mi)
- Elevation: 300 m (980 ft)
- Highest elevation: 382 m (1,253 ft)
- Lowest elevation: 269 m (883 ft)
- Population (2023): 968
  - Density: 236/km^{2} (610/sq mi)
- Time zone: UTC+01:00 (CET)
  - Summer (DST): UTC+02:00 (CEST)
- INSEE/Postal code: 42294 /42120
- ^{1} French Land Register data, which excludes lakes, ponds, glaciers > 1 km^{2} (0.386 sq mi or 247 acres) and river estuaries.

Saint-Vincent-de-Boisset (French pronunciation: [sɛ̃ vɛ̃sɑ̃ də bwasɛ]; Arpitan: Sant-Vincent-de-Bouessê) is a commune in the Loire department in central France.

== Population ==
Historical population
Year	Pop.	±% p.a.
1968	431	—
1975	554	+3.65%
1982	656	+2.44%
1990	811	+2.69%
1999	878	+0.89%
2007	877	−0.01%
2012	873	−0.09%
2017	966	+2.05%
2023	968	+0.03%
Source: INSEE

== See also ==
- Communes of the Loire department
