= Lay, Loire =

Lay
- Commune
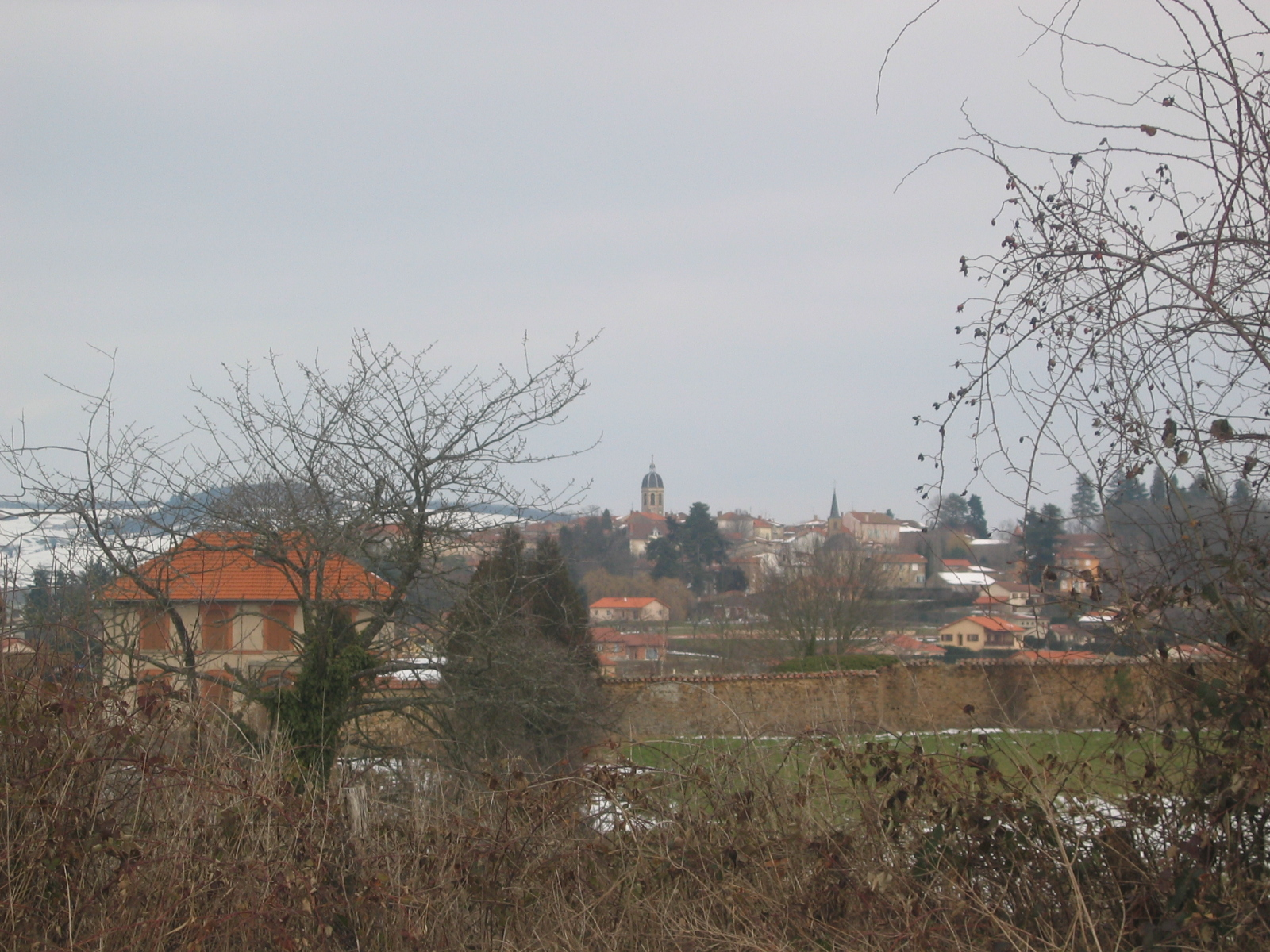

- Coat of arms
- Location of Lay
- Location within France Location within Auvergne-Rhône-Alpes
- Coordinates: 45°57′23″N 4°13′08″E
- Country: France
- Region: Auvergne-Rhône-Alpes
- Department: Loire
- Arrondissement: Roanne
- Canton: Le Coteau
- Intercommunality: Pays entre Loire et Rhône

Government
  - Mayor (2020–2026): Jean-Marc Giraud
- Area^{1}: 12.85 km^{2} (4.96 sq mi)
- Elevation: 460 m (1,510 ft)
- Highest elevation: 592 m (1,942 ft)
- Lowest elevation: 339 m (1,112 ft)
- Population (2023): 777
  - Density: 60.5/km^{2} (157/sq mi)
- Time zone: UTC+01:00 (CET)
  - Summer (DST): UTC+02:00 (CEST)
- INSEE/Postal code: 42118 /42470
- ^{1} French Land Register data, which excludes lakes, ponds, glaciers > 1 km^{2} (0.386 sq mi or 247 acres) and river estuaries.

Lay is a commune in the Loire department in central France.

== Population ==
Historical population
Year	Pop.	±% p.a.
1968	644	—
1975	616	−0.63%
1982	616	+0.00%
1990	687	+1.37%
1999	648	−0.65%
2007	694	+0.86%
2012	718	+0.68%
2017	745	+0.74%
2023	777	+0.70%
Source: INSEE

== See also ==
- Communes of the Loire department
