= Neaux =

- Commune
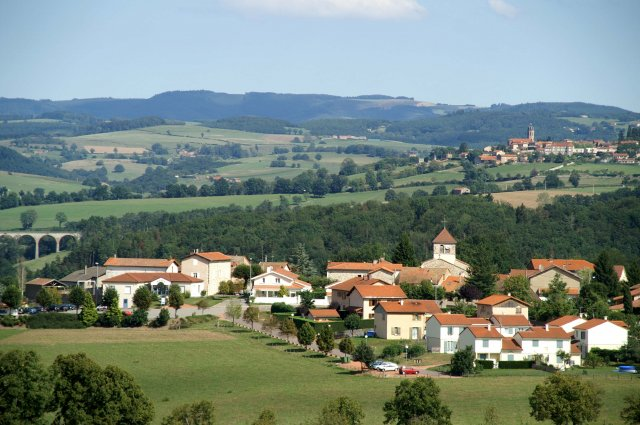
- Location of Neaux
- Location within France Location within Auvergne-Rhône-Alpes
- Coordinates: 45°57′47″N 4°10′51″E
- Country: France
- Region: Auvergne-Rhône-Alpes
- Department: Loire
- Arrondissement: Roanne
- Canton: Le Coteau
- Intercommunality: Pays entre Loire et Rhône

Government
  - Mayor (2020–2026): Dominique Givre
- Area^{1}: 17.36 km^{2} (6.70 sq mi)
- Elevation: 400 m (1,300 ft)
- Highest elevation: 606 m (1,988 ft)
- Lowest elevation: 294 m (965 ft)
- Population (2023): 485
  - Density: 27.9/km^{2} (72.4/sq mi)
- Time zone: UTC+01:00 (CET)
  - Summer (DST): UTC+02:00 (CEST)
- INSEE/Postal code: 42153 /42470
- ^{1} French Land Register data, which excludes lakes, ponds, glaciers > 1 km^{2} (0.386 sq mi or 247 acres) and river estuaries.

Neaux is a commune in the Loire department in central France.

== Population ==
Historical population
| Year | Pop. | ±% p.a. |
|---|---|---|
| 1968 | 374 | — |
| 1975 | 364 | −0.39% |
| 1982 | 383 | +0.73% |
| 1990 | 446 | +1.92% |
| 1999 | 443 | −0.07% |
| 2007 | 464 | +0.58% |
| 2012 | 512 | +1.99% |
| 2017 | 480 | −1.28% |
| 2023 | 485 | +0.17% |
Source: INSEE

== See also ==
- Communes of the Loire department
