= Parigny, Loire =

Parigny
- Commune
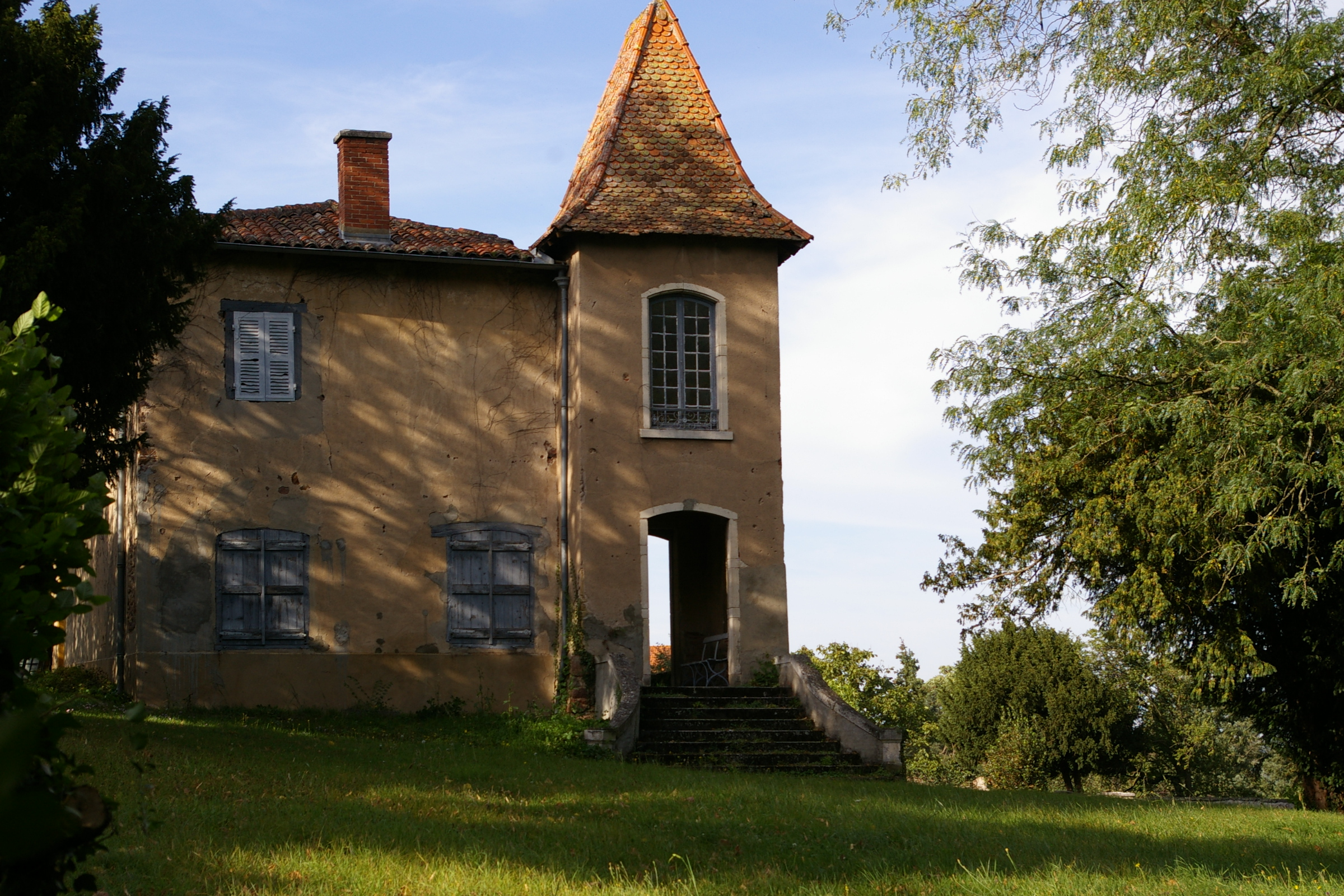
- House of the Provost

- Coat of arms
- Location of Parigny
- Location within France Location within Auvergne-Rhône-Alpes
- Coordinates: 45°59′29″N 4°05′53″E
- Country: France
- Region: Auvergne-Rhône-Alpes
- Department: Loire
- Arrondissement: Roanne
- Canton: Le Coteau
- Intercommunality: Roannais Agglomération

Government
  - Mayor (2020–2026): Dominique Bruyère
- Area^{1}: 9.15 km^{2} (3.53 sq mi)
- Elevation: 331 m (1,086 ft)
- Highest elevation: 446 m (1,463 ft)
- Lowest elevation: 277 m (909 ft)
- Population (2023): 629
  - Density: 68.7/km^{2} (178/sq mi)
- Time zone: UTC+01:00 (CET)
  - Summer (DST): UTC+02:00 (CEST)
- INSEE/Postal code: 42166 /42120
- ^{1} French Land Register data, which excludes lakes, ponds, glaciers > 1 km^{2} (0.386 sq mi or 247 acres) and river estuaries.

Parigny (French pronunciation: [paʁiɲi]) is a commune in the Loire department in central France.

== Population ==
Historical population
Year	Pop.	±% p.a.
1968	280	—
1975	372	+4.14%
1982	469	+3.37%
1990	503	+0.88%
1999	507	+0.09%
2007	561	+1.27%
2012	618	+1.95%
2017	609	−0.29%
2023	629	+0.54%
Source: INSEE

== See also ==
- Communes of the Loire department
