= Machézal =

- Commune
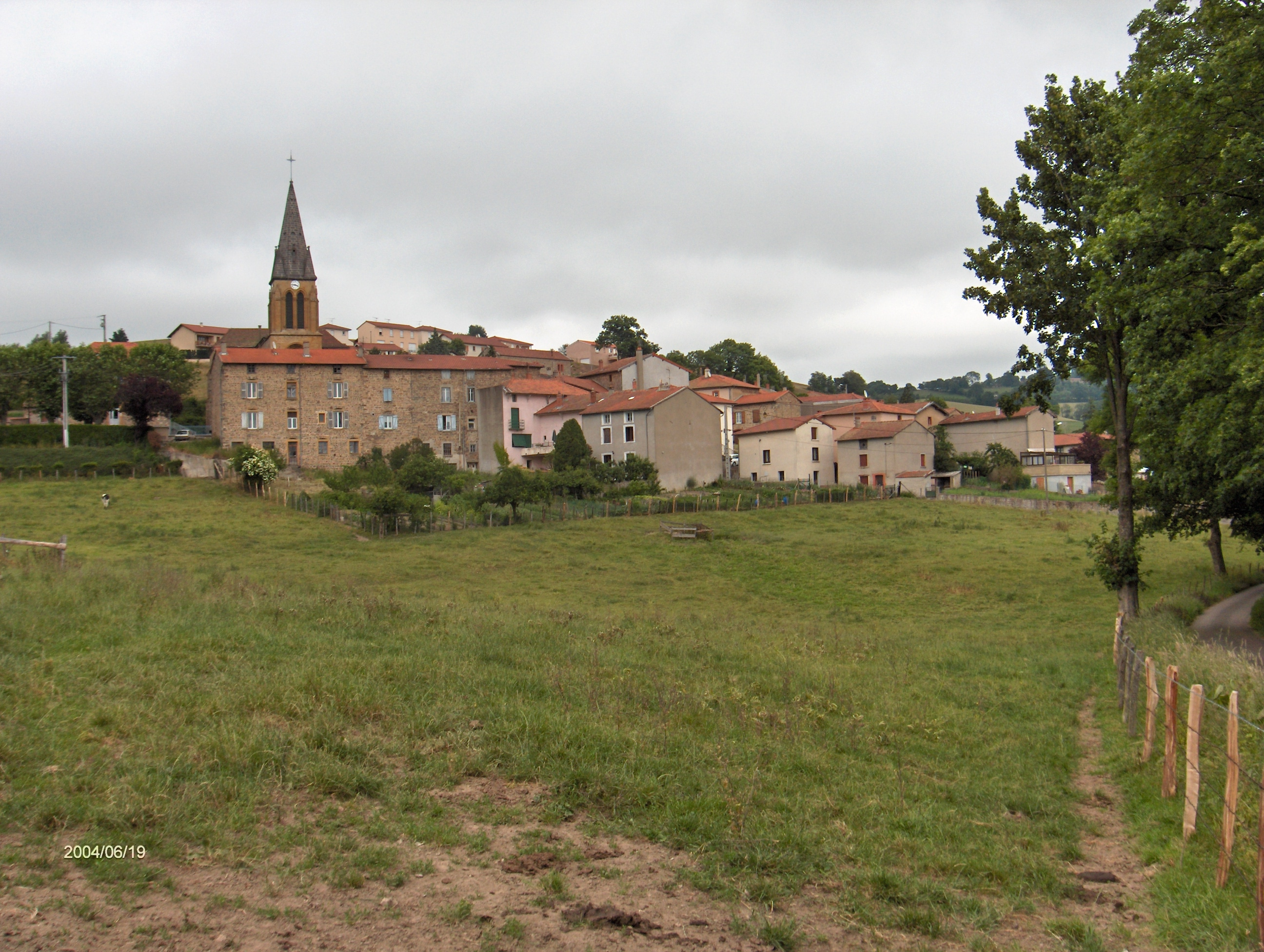
- Location of Machézal
- Location within France Location within Auvergne-Rhône-Alpes
- Coordinates: 45°55′21″N 4°18′11″E
- Country: France
- Region: Auvergne-Rhône-Alpes
- Department: Loire
- Arrondissement: Roanne
- Canton: Le Coteau
- Intercommunality: Pays entre Loire et Rhône

Government
  - Mayor (2020–2026): Béatrice Fournel
- Area^{1}: 13.88 km^{2} (5.36 sq mi)
- Elevation: 625 m (2,051 ft)
- Highest elevation: 882 m (2,894 ft)
- Lowest elevation: 470 m (1,540 ft)
- Population (2023): 403
  - Density: 29.0/km^{2} (75.2/sq mi)
- Time zone: UTC+01:00 (CET)
  - Summer (DST): UTC+02:00 (CEST)
- INSEE/Postal code: 42128 /42114
- ^{1} French Land Register data, which excludes lakes, ponds, glaciers > 1 km^{2} (0.386 sq mi or 247 acres) and river estuaries.

Machézal (French pronunciation: [maʃezal]; Arpitan: Mont-Chesâl) is a commune in the Loire department in central France.

== Population ==
Historical population
Year	Pop.	±% p.a.
1968	353	—
1975	323	−1.26%
1982	315	−0.36%
1990	306	−0.36%
1999	361	+1.85%
2007	407	+1.51%
2012	416	+0.44%
2017	382	−1.69%
2023	403	+0.90%
Source: INSEE

== See also ==
- Communes of the Loire department
