= Fourneaux, Loire =

Fourneaux
- Commune
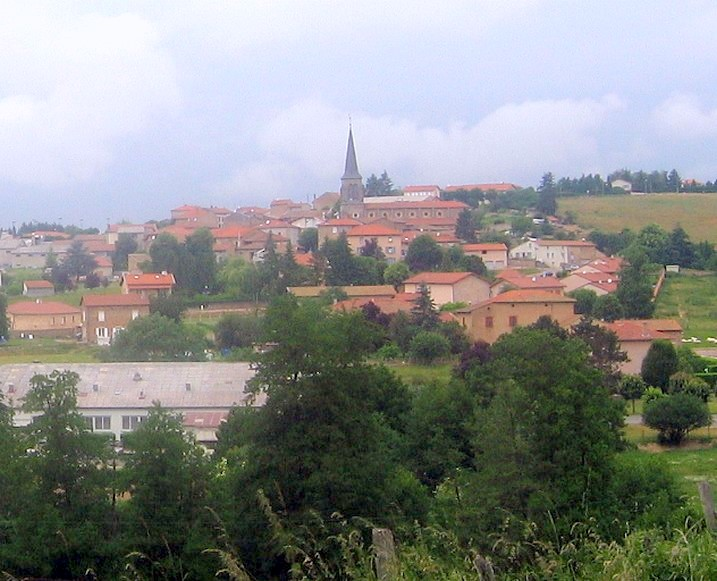

- Coat of arms
- Location of Fourneaux
- Location within France Location within Auvergne-Rhône-Alpes
- Coordinates: 45°56′16″N 4°16′13″E
- Country: France
- Region: Auvergne-Rhône-Alpes
- Department: Loire
- Arrondissement: Roanne
- Canton: Le Coteau
- Intercommunality: Pays entre Loire et Rhône

Government
  - Mayor (2020–2026): Jean-François Neyrand
- Area^{1}: 12.17 km^{2} (4.70 sq mi)
- Elevation: 530 m (1,740 ft)
- Highest elevation: 607 m (1,991 ft)
- Lowest elevation: 416 m (1,365 ft)
- Population (2023): 563
  - Density: 46.3/km^{2} (120/sq mi)
- Time zone: UTC+01:00 (CET)
  - Summer (DST): UTC+02:00 (CEST)
- INSEE/Postal code: 42098 /42470
- ^{1} French Land Register data, which excludes lakes, ponds, glaciers > 1 km^{2} (0.386 sq mi or 247 acres) and river estuaries.

Fourneaux (French pronunciation: [fuʁno]) is a commune in the Loire department in central France.

== Population ==
Historical population
Year	Pop.	±% p.a.
1968	565	—
1975	508	−1.51%
1982	490	−0.51%
1990	528	+0.94%
1999	548	+0.41%
2007	634	+1.84%
2012	630	−0.13%
2017	588	−1.37%
2023	563	−0.72%
Source: INSEE

== See also ==
- Communes of the Loire department
