= Saint-Cyr-de-Favières =

- Commune
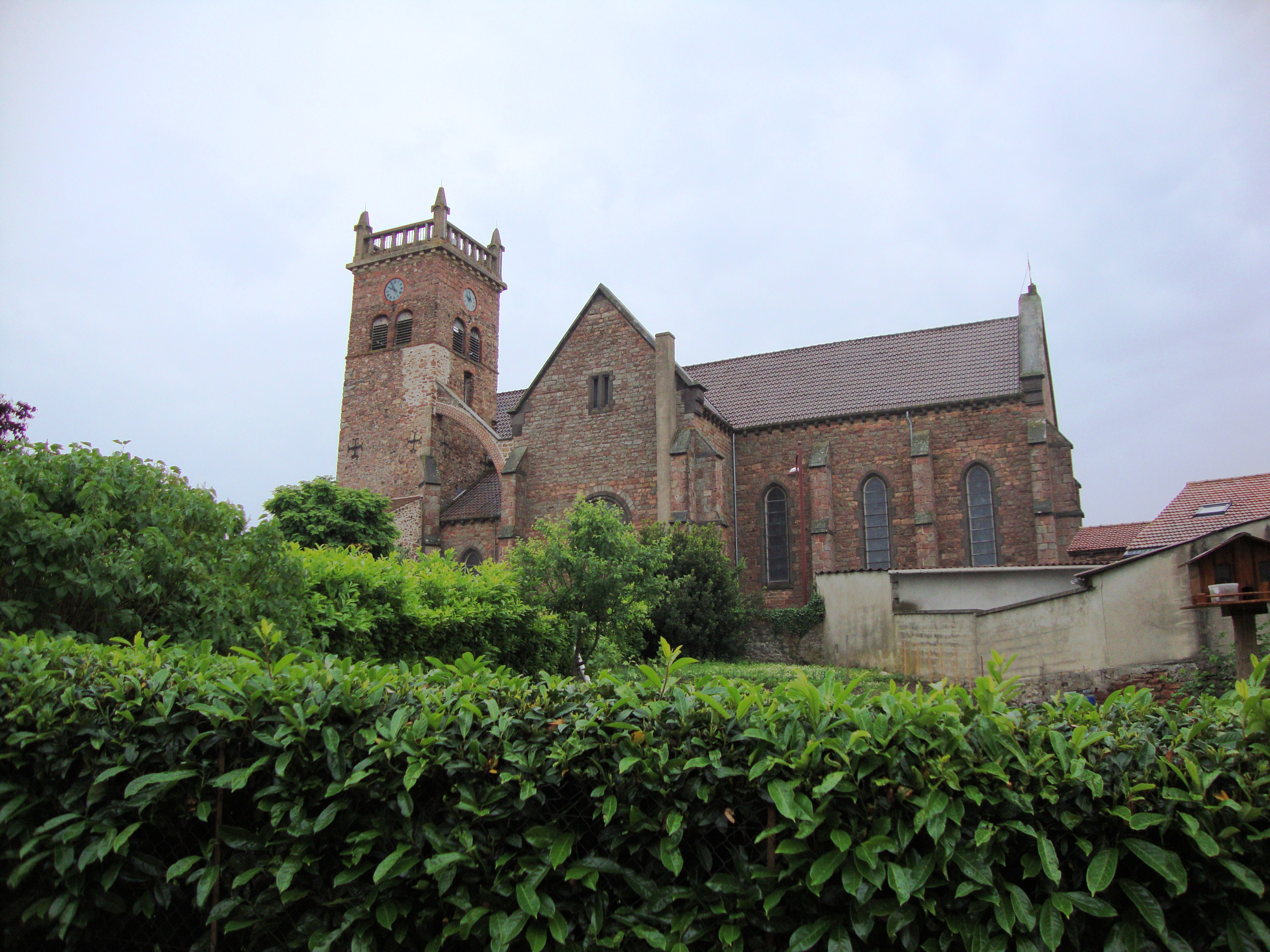
- The church in Saint-Cyr-de-Favières

- Coat of arms
- Location of Saint-Cyr-de-Favières
- Location within France Location within Auvergne-Rhône-Alpes
- Coordinates: 45°58′03″N 4°05′44″E
- Country: France
- Region: Auvergne-Rhône-Alpes
- Department: Loire
- Arrondissement: Roanne
- Canton: Le Coteau
- Intercommunality: Pays entre Loire et Rhône

Government
  - Mayor (2020–2026): Serge Reulier
- Area^{1}: 14.11 km^{2} (5.45 sq mi)
- Elevation: 428 m (1,404 ft)
- Highest elevation: 541 m (1,775 ft)
- Lowest elevation: 287 m (942 ft)
- Population (2023): 1,037
  - Density: 73.49/km^{2} (190.3/sq mi)
- Time zone: UTC+01:00 (CET)
  - Summer (DST): UTC+02:00 (CEST)
- INSEE/Postal code: 42212 /42123
- ^{1} French Land Register data, which excludes lakes, ponds, glaciers > 1 km^{2} (0.386 sq mi or 247 acres) and river estuaries.

Saint-Cyr-de-Favières (French pronunciation: [sɛ̃ siʁ də favjɛʁ]) is a commune in the Loire department in central France.

== Population ==
Historical population
Year	Pop.	±% p.a.
1968	480	—
1975	547	+1.88%
1982	696	+3.50%
1990	710	+0.25%
1999	773	+0.95%
2007	805	+0.51%
2012	808	+0.07%
2017	917	+2.56%
2023	1,037	+2.07%
Source: INSEE

== See also ==
- Communes of the Loire department
