= Perreux, Loire =

Perreux
- Commune
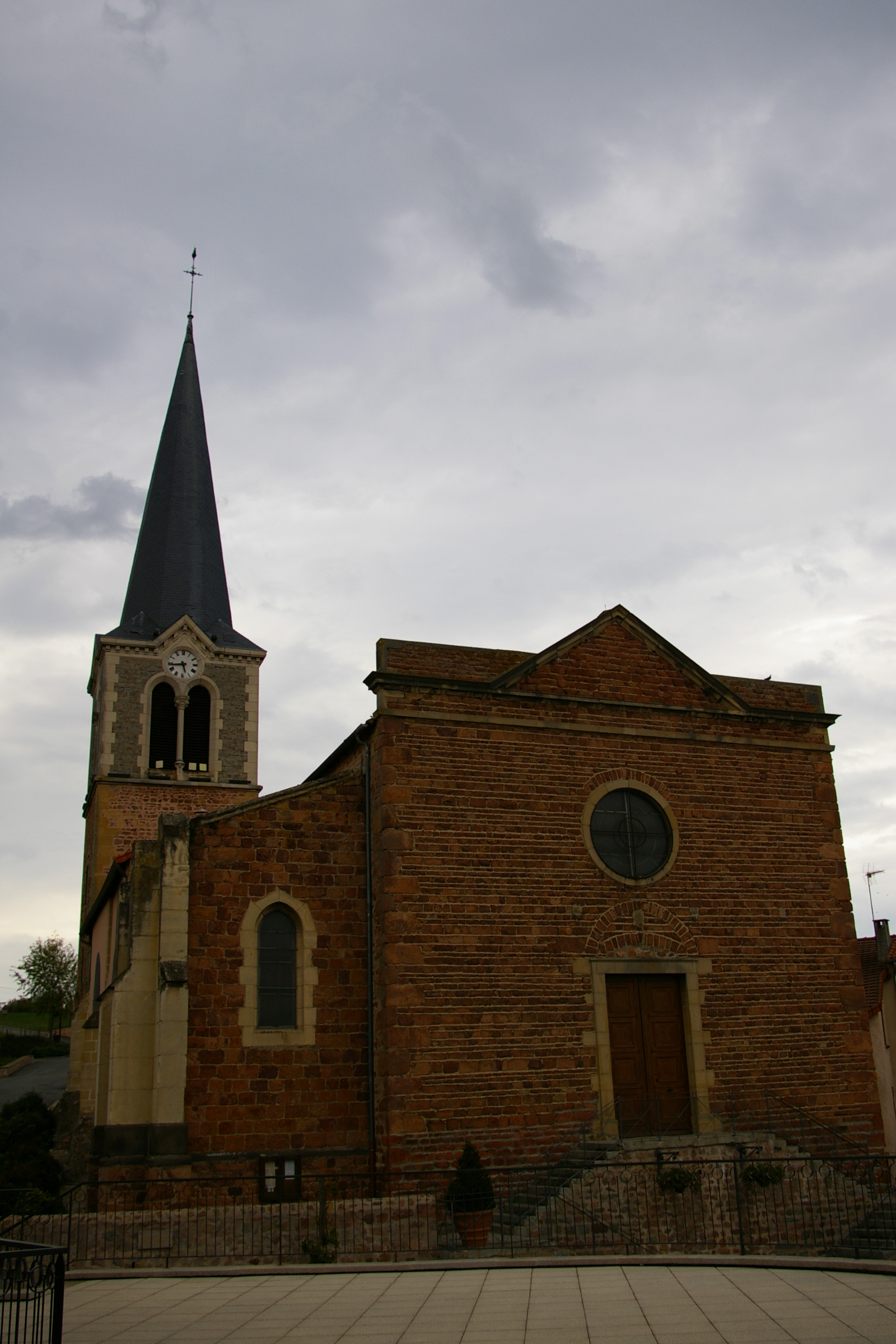

- Coat of arms
- Location of Perreux
- Location within France Location within Auvergne-Rhône-Alpes
- Coordinates: 46°02′20″N 4°07′23″E
- Country: France
- Region: Auvergne-Rhône-Alpes
- Department: Loire
- Arrondissement: Roanne
- Canton: Le Coteau
- Intercommunality: Roannais Agglomération

Government
  - Mayor (2020–2026): Jean Yves Boire
- Area^{1}: 41.35 km^{2} (15.97 sq mi)
- Elevation: 320 m (1,050 ft)
- Highest elevation: 436 m (1,430 ft)
- Lowest elevation: 255 m (837 ft)
- Population (2023): 2,111
  - Density: 51.05/km^{2} (132.2/sq mi)
- Time zone: UTC+01:00 (CET)
  - Summer (DST): UTC+02:00 (CEST)
- INSEE/Postal code: 42170 /42120
- ^{1} French Land Register data, which excludes lakes, ponds, glaciers > 1 km^{2} (0.386 sq mi or 247 acres) and river estuaries.

Perreux (French pronunciation: [pɛʁø]) is a commune in the Loire department in central France.

== Population ==
Historical population

Year	Pop.	±% p.a.
1793	2,525	—
1821	1,983	−0.86%
1846	2,578	+1.06%
1872	2,565	−0.02%
1901	2,170	−0.58%
1926	1,503	−1.46%
1946	1,651	+0.47%
1962	1,728	+0.29%
1968	1,907	+1.66%

Year	Pop.	±% p.a.
1975	1,885	−0.17%
1982	1,933	+0.36%
1990	1,985	+0.33%
1999	2,075	+0.49%
2007	2,163	+0.52%
2012	2,212	+0.45%
2017	2,114	−0.90%
2023	2,111	−0.02%

Source: EHESS and INSEE (1968-2023)

== See also ==
- Communes of the Loire department
