= Pinay, Loire =

Pinay
- Commune
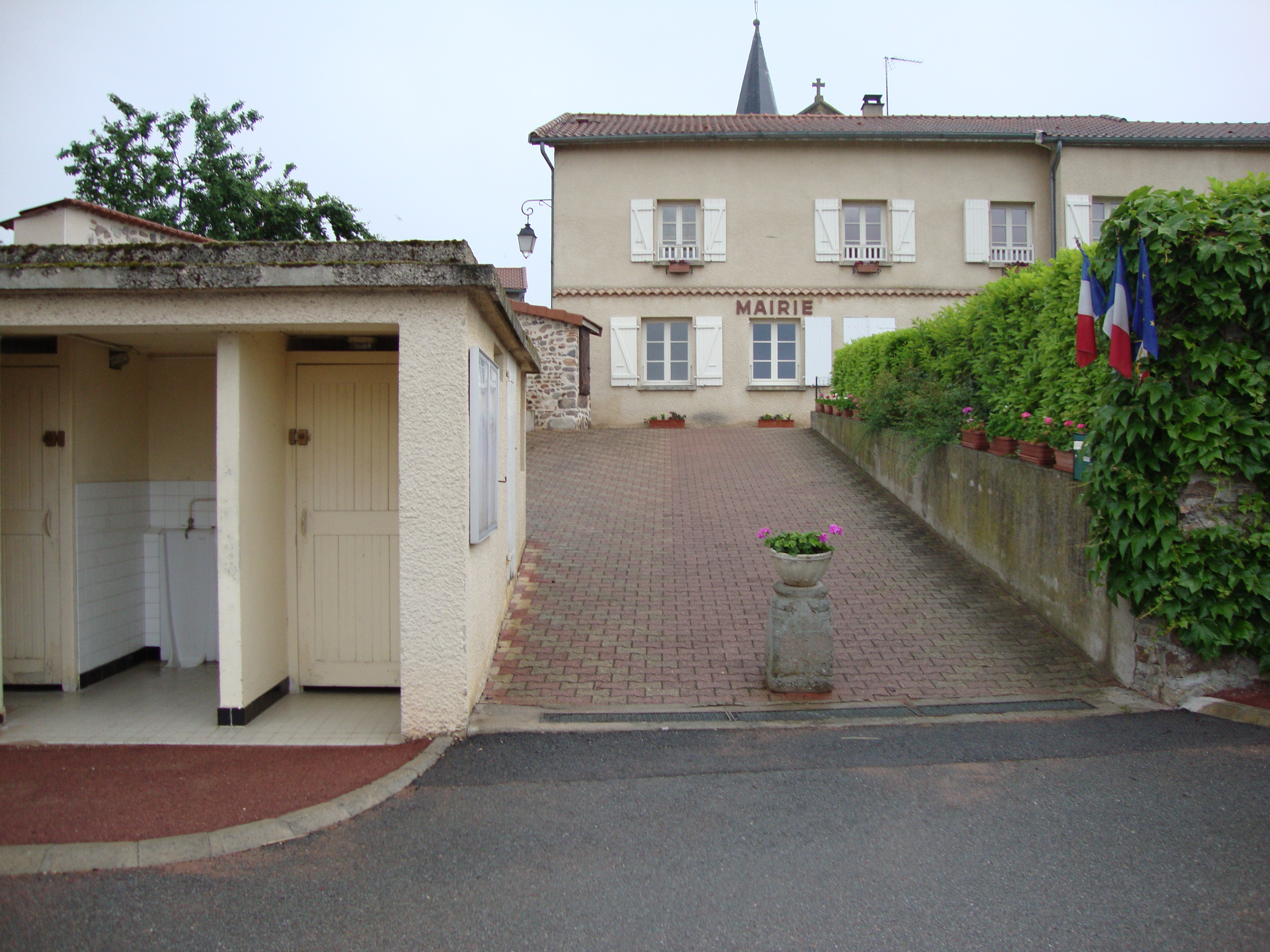
- Town hall

- Coat of arms
- Location of Pinay
- Location within France Location within Auvergne-Rhône-Alpes
- Coordinates: 45°52′27″N 4°08′17″E
- Country: France
- Region: Auvergne-Rhône-Alpes
- Department: Loire
- Arrondissement: Roanne
- Canton: Le Coteau

Government
  - Mayor (2020–2026): Henri Bonada
- Area^{1}: 6.62 km^{2} (2.56 sq mi)
- Elevation: 416 m (1,365 ft)
- Highest elevation: 470 m (1,540 ft)
- Lowest elevation: 302 m (991 ft)
- Population (2023): 286
  - Density: 43.2/km^{2} (112/sq mi)
- Time zone: UTC+01:00 (CET)
  - Summer (DST): UTC+02:00 (CEST)
- INSEE/Postal code: 42171 /42590
- ^{1} French Land Register data, which excludes lakes, ponds, glaciers > 1 km^{2} (0.386 sq mi or 247 acres) and river estuaries.

Pinay (French pronunciation: [pinɛ]) is a commune in the Loire department in central France.

== Population ==
Historical population
Year	Pop.	±% p.a.
1968	343	—
1975	268	−3.46%
1982	277	+0.47%
1990	280	+0.13%
1999	273	−0.28%
2007	275	+0.09%
2012	275	+0.00%
2017	284	+0.65%
2023	286	+0.12%
Source: INSEE

== See also ==
- Communes of the Loire department
