= John Renbourn (album) =

Studio album by John Renbourn
- Released: 1966
- Recorded: 1965
- Genre: Folk
- Label: Transatlantic
- Producer: Nathan Joseph

John Renbourn chronology
| John Renbourn (1966) | Another Monday (1967) |

Professional ratings
Review scores
| Source | Rating |
|---|---|
| Allmusic | link |

John Renbourn is the debut album by John Renbourn.

== Track listing ==
All tracks composed by John Renbourn, except where indicated.

1. "Judy"
2. "Beth's Blues" (Blind Boy Fuller)
3. "Song" (poem by John Donne)
4. "Down on the Barge"
5. "John Henry" (Traditional; arranged by John Renbourn)
6. "Plainsong"
7. "Louisiana Blues" (Muddy Waters)
8. "Blue Bones" (Renbourn, Bert Jansch)
9. "Train Tune"
10. "Candy Man" (Rev. Gary Davis)
11. "The Wildest Pig in Captivity"
12. "National Seven"
13. "Motherless Children" (Traditional; arranged by John Renbourn)
14. "Winter is Gone" (Traditional; arranged by John Renbourn)
15. "Noah and Rabbit" (Renbourn, Bert Jansch)

== Personnel ==
- John Renbourn - guitar, vocals
- Bert Jansch - guitar on "Blue Bones" and "Noah and Rabbit"

Technical

- Jimmy Duncan, Nathan Joseph, Peter Attwood - recording
- Brian Shuel - cover design, photography
