= Bonny-sur-Loire =

- Commune
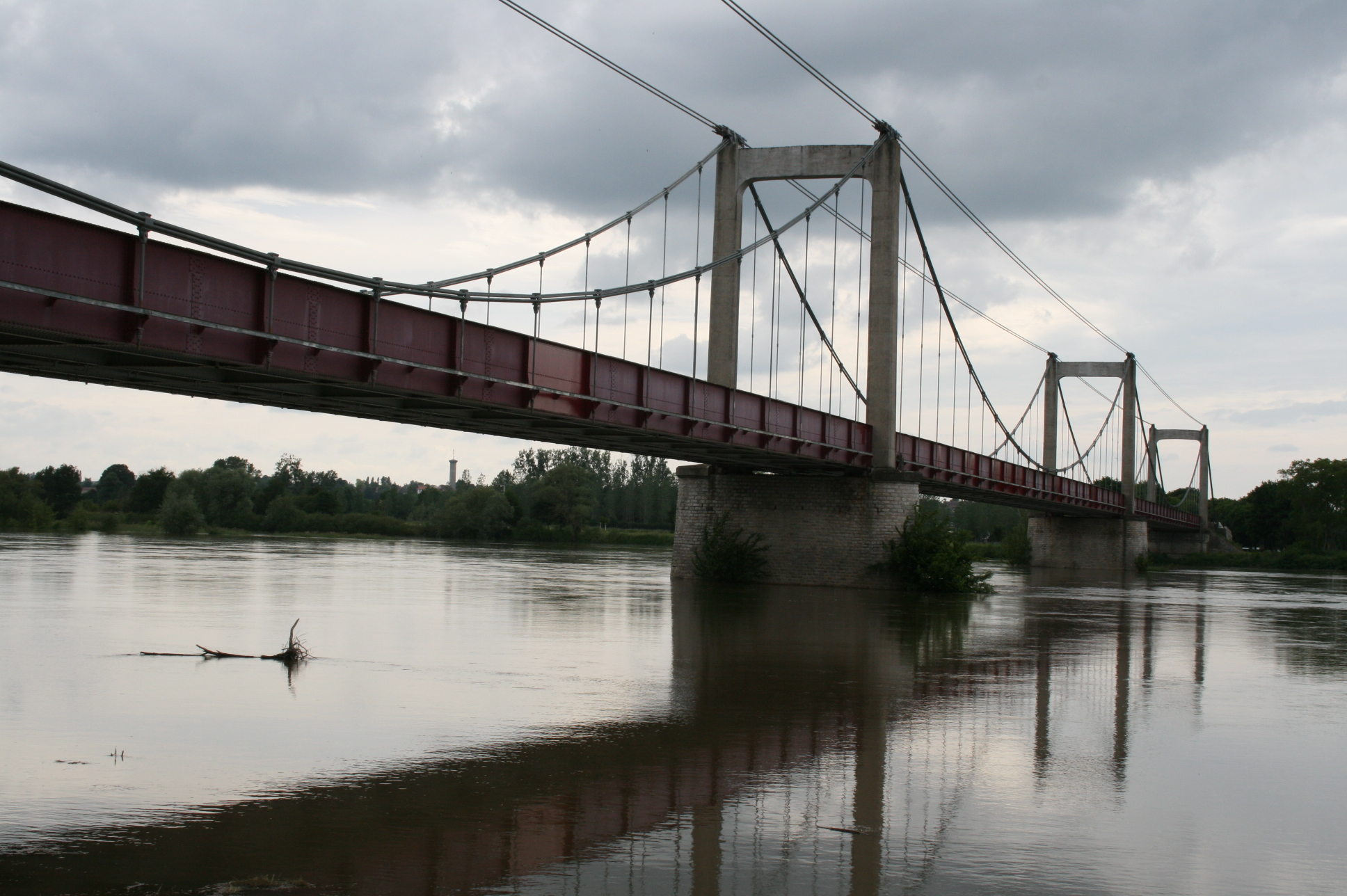
- The suspension bridge

- Coat of arms
- Location of Bonny-sur-Loire
- Location within France Location within Centre-Val de Loire
- Coordinates: 47°33′41″N 2°50′27″E
- Country: France
- Region: Centre-Val de Loire
- Department: Loiret
- Arrondissement: Montargis
- Canton: Gien
- Intercommunality: Berry Loire Puisaye

Government
  - Mayor (2020–2026): Michel Chaillou
- Area^{1}: 25.8 km^{2} (10.0 sq mi)
- Highest elevation: 189 m (620 ft)
- Lowest elevation: 130 m (430 ft)
- Population (2023): 1,870
  - Density: 72.5/km^{2} (188/sq mi)
- Time zone: UTC+01:00 (CET)
  - Summer (DST): UTC+02:00 (CEST)
- INSEE/Postal code: 45040 /45420
- ^{1} French Land Register data, which excludes lakes, ponds, glaciers > 1 km^{2} (0.386 sq mi or 247 acres) and river estuaries.

Bonny-sur-Loire (French pronunciation: [bɔni syʁ lwaʁ], literally Bonny on Loire) is a commune in the Loiret department of the Centre-Val de Loire region of north-central France.

== Place name ==
The name is evidenced historically at least since the beginning of the seventeenth century.

== Geography ==
The commune of Bonny stands beside the river Loire, at the border of the Bourgogne-Franche-Comté region and separated from the Nièvre department by the river Cheuille. The town is situated on the main route between Paris and Nevers, the A77 and RN7.

== Population ==
Historical population
Year	Pop.	±% p.a.
1968	1,701	—
1975	1,778	+0.63%
1982	1,830	+0.41%
1990	1,921	+0.61%
1999	1,924	+0.02%
2007	2,043	+0.75%
2012	2,009	−0.34%
2017	1,952	−0.57%
2023	1,870	−0.71%
Source: INSEE

The inhabitants are known as Bonnychons in French.

== Administration ==
The mayor is Michel Chaillou, in office since 2020.

== Sights ==
Suspension bridge between Bonny-sur-Loire et Beaulieu-sur-Loire (carrying the road D926)

== Quality of life ==
Bonny-sur-Loire is a ville fleurie, graded at the level of three flowers by the National Council for the Villes et Villages Fleuris de France.

== Celebrations ==
- Val de Jazz : in July
- Wine festival and Second-Hand Market : the last Sunday in July
- Salon of autumnal art: the week of 1 November
- Saint-Aignan : each year, in November

== Personalities ==
- Nicolas Habicot (1550–1624), surgeon of the Duke of Nemours and anatomist, was born at Bonny
- François Jean-Baptiste d'Alphonse (1756–1821) born at Bonny, was a politician of the 18th-19th centuries
- Désiré Lubin (1854–1929), painter, born at Bonny.

== See also ==
- Communes of the Loiret department
