= Autry-le-Châtel =

- Commune
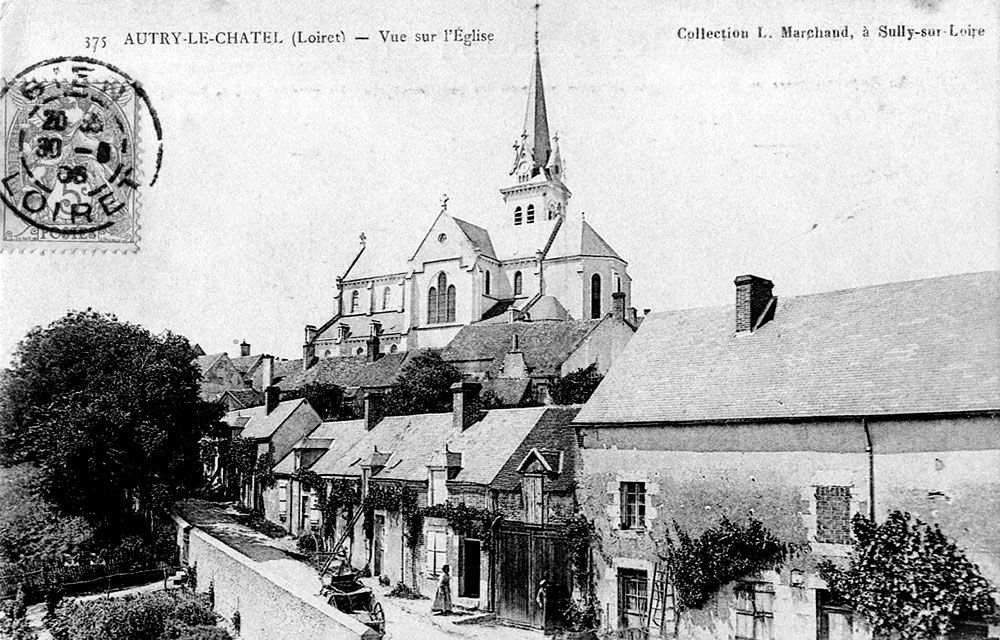
- Old postcard of Autry-le-Châtel

- Coat of arms
- Location of Autry-le-Châtel
- Location within France Location within Centre-Val de Loire
- Coordinates: 47°35′54″N 2°36′11″E
- Country: France
- Region: Centre-Val de Loire
- Department: Loiret
- Arrondissement: Montargis
- Canton: Gien
- Intercommunality: CC Berry Loire Puisaye

Government
  - Mayor (2020–2026): Jérémy Noël
- Area^{1}: 50.56 km^{2} (19.52 sq mi)
- Highest elevation: 236 m (774 ft)
- Lowest elevation: 141 m (463 ft)
- Population (2023): 845
  - Density: 16.7/km^{2} (43.3/sq mi)
- Time zone: UTC+01:00 (CET)
  - Summer (DST): UTC+02:00 (CEST)
- INSEE/Postal code: 45016 /45500
- ^{1} French Land Register data, which excludes lakes, ponds, glaciers > 1 km^{2} (0.386 sq mi or 247 acres) and river estuaries.

Autry-le-Châtel (French pronunciation: [otʁi lə ʃatɛl]) is a commune in the Loiret department in north-central France.

A famous cheese in this region is the Crottin de Chavignol. There is a Catholic church of Saint-Etienne in the center of the village. There is also a castle.

== Geography ==
The commune of Autry-le-Châtel is located in the southeast of the department of Loiret, in the agricultural region of Berry. It is located 62.1 km from Orléans, prefecture of the department, 45.8 km from Montargis, sub-prefecture, and 11.4 km from Châtillon-sur-Loire. The nearest municipalities are: Cernoy-en-Berry (7.7 km), Saint-Martin-sur-Ocre (8 km), Saint-Brisson-sur-Loire (8.1 km), Coullons (8.7 km) km), Poilly-lez-Gien (8.9 km), Blancafort (9.1 km, in the Cher), Saint-Firmin-sur-Loire (10.2 km), Gien (10.6 km), Briare (11 km) and Châtillon-sur-Loire (11.4 km).

== Places and monuments ==
- The remains of the old castle dating from the twelfth century
- The Small Castle dating from the end of the fifteenth century, listed as a historic monument on 6 January 1971
- The Saint-Etienne Church of the nineteenth century bears the name of "Liberty, Equality, Fraternity", motto of the French Republic
- The forest of Saint-Brisson
- The valley of Notre-Heure and its paddle-mills
- The pond of Coudreaux.

== Population ==
Historical population
| Year | Pop. | ±% p.a. |
|---|---|---|
| 1968 | 853 | — |
| 1975 | 835 | −0.30% |
| 1982 | 937 | +1.66% |
| 1990 | 919 | −0.24% |
| 1999 | 1,015 | +1.11% |
| 2007 | 1,032 | +0.21% |
| 2012 | 1,011 | −0.41% |
| 2017 | 961 | −1.01% |
| 2023 | 845 | −2.12% |
Source: INSEE

== See also ==
- Communes of the Loiret department
