= Pierrefitte-ès-Bois =

- Commune
- Coat of arms
- Location of Pierrefitte-ès-Bois
- Location within France Location within Centre-Val de Loire
- Coordinates: 47°30′25″N 2°42′58″E
- Country: France
- Region: Centre-Val de Loire
- Department: Loiret
- Arrondissement: Montargis
- Canton: Gien

Government
  - Mayor (2021–2026): Audrey Ruzza
- Area^{1}: 27.18 km^{2} (10.49 sq mi)
- Highest elevation: 273 m (896 ft)
- Population (2023): 282
  - Density: 10.4/km^{2} (26.9/sq mi)
- Time zone: UTC+01:00 (CET)
  - Summer (DST): UTC+02:00 (CEST)
- INSEE/Postal code: 45251 /45360
- ^{1} French Land Register data, which excludes lakes, ponds, glaciers > 1 km^{2} (0.386 sq mi or 247 acres) and river estuaries.

Pierrefitte-ès-Bois (French pronunciation: [pjɛʁfit ɛs bwa]) is a commune in the Loiret department in north-central France.

== See also ==
- Communes of the Loiret department
