= Batilly-en-Puisaye =

- Commune
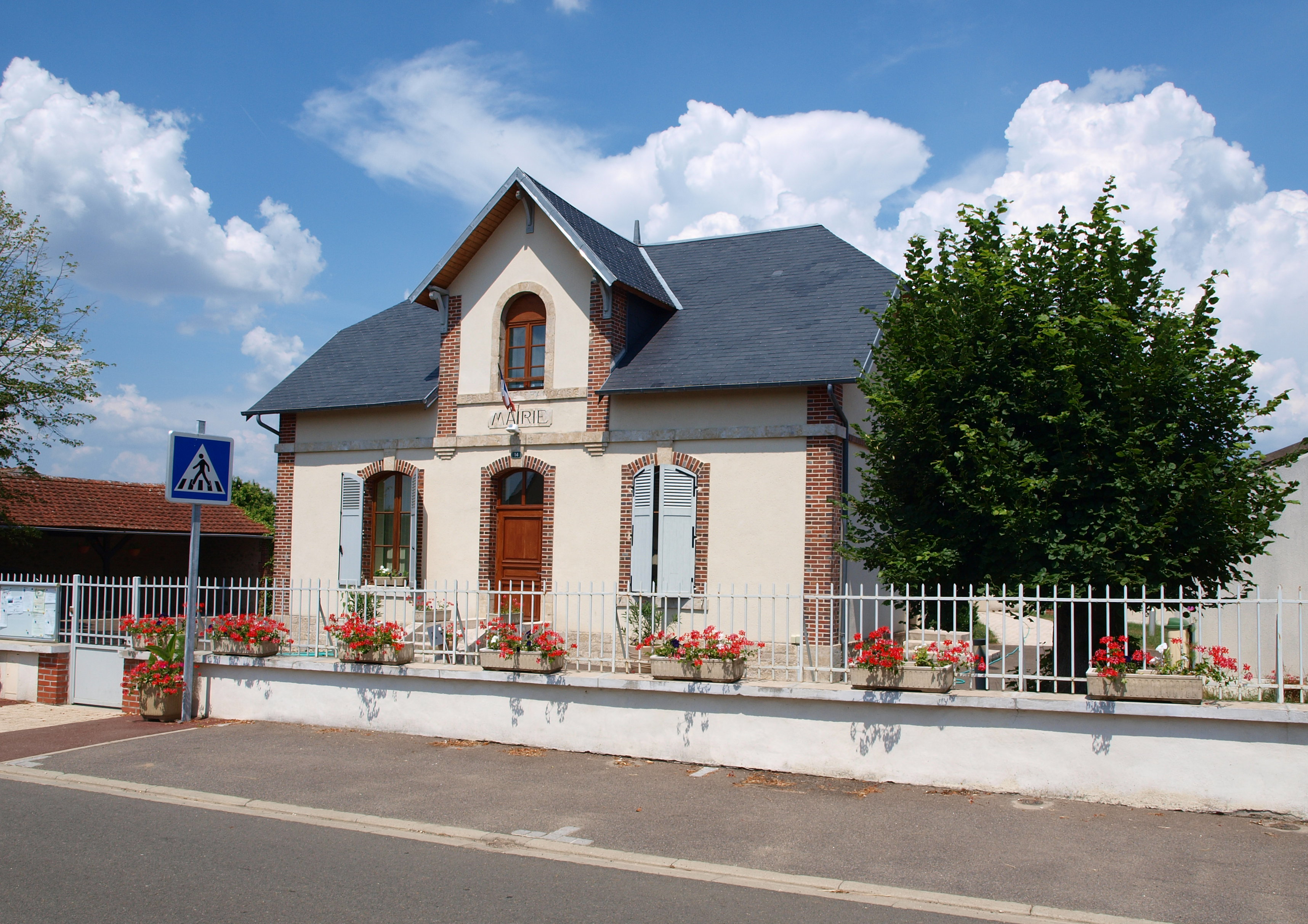
- The town hall in Batilly-en-Puisaye
- Location of Batilly-en-Puisaye
- Location within France Location within Centre-Val de Loire
- Coordinates: 47°36′47″N 2°53′03″E
- Country: France
- Region: Centre-Val de Loire
- Department: Loiret
- Arrondissement: Montargis
- Canton: Gien
- Intercommunality: Berry Loire Puisaye

Government
  - Mayor (2020–2026): Hubert Poulain
- Area^{1}: 17.35 km^{2} (6.70 sq mi)
- Highest elevation: 211 m (692 ft)
- Lowest elevation: 155 m (509 ft)
- Population (2023): 108
  - Density: 6.22/km^{2} (16.1/sq mi)
- Time zone: UTC+01:00 (CET)
  - Summer (DST): UTC+02:00 (CEST)
- INSEE/Postal code: 45023 /45420
- ^{1} French Land Register data, which excludes lakes, ponds, glaciers > 1 km^{2} (0.386 sq mi or 247 acres) and river estuaries.

Batilly-en-Puisaye (French pronunciation: [batiji ɑ̃ pɥizɛ], literally Batilly in Puisaye) is a commune in the Loiret department in north-central France.

== Population ==
Historical population
Year	Pop.	±% p.a.
1968	164	—
1975	123	−4.03%
1982	122	−0.12%
1990	95	−3.08%
1999	110	+1.64%
2007	108	−0.23%
2012	112	+0.73%
2017	116	+0.70%
2023	108	−1.18%
Source: INSEE

== See also ==
- Communes of the Loiret department
