= Escrignelles =

- Commune
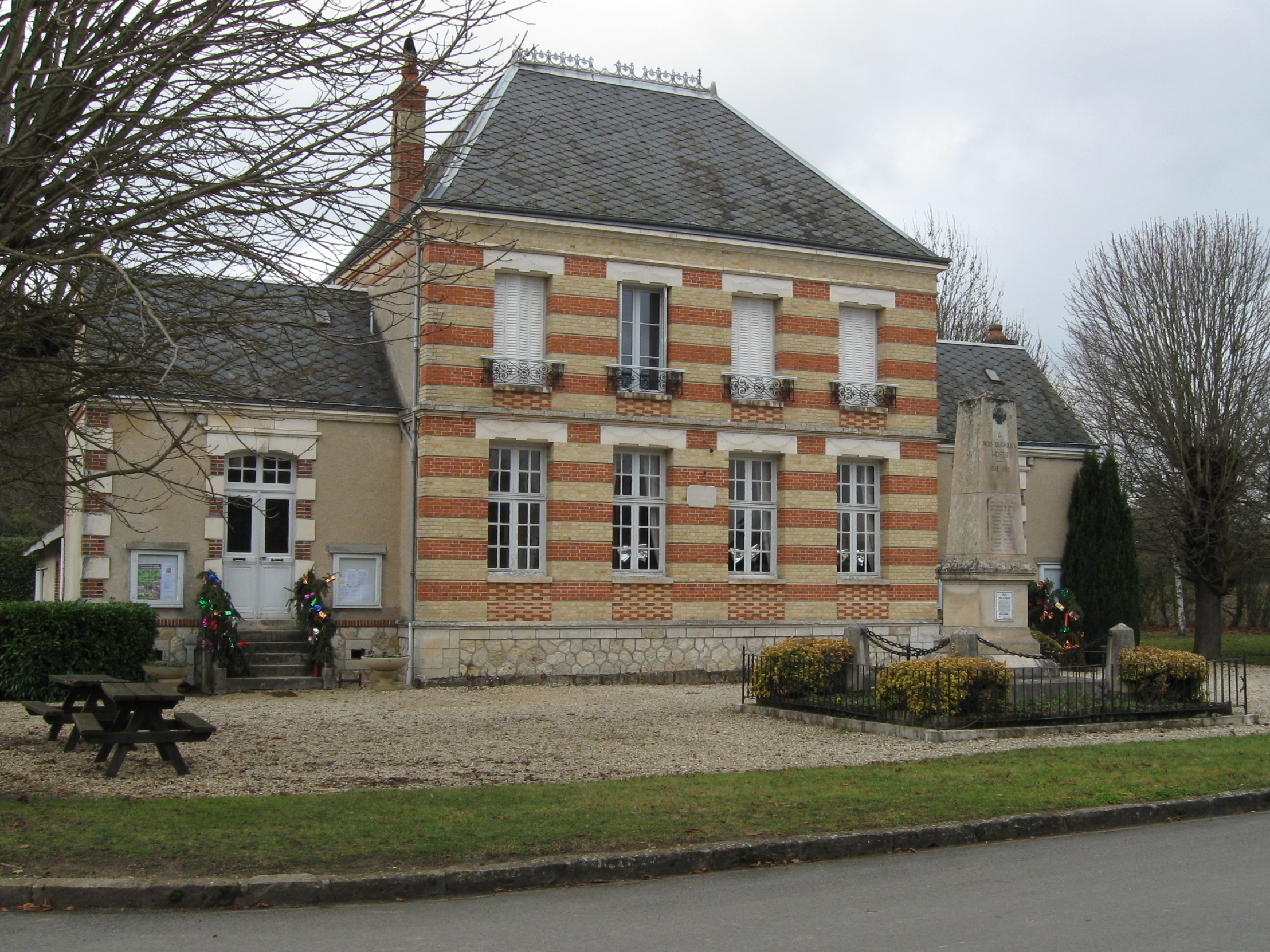
- The town hall and the war memorial in Escrignelles
- Location of Escrignelles
- Location within France Location within Centre-Val de Loire
- Coordinates: 47°42′54″N 2°53′32″E
- Country: France
- Region: Centre-Val de Loire
- Department: Loiret
- Arrondissement: Montargis
- Canton: Gien
- Intercommunality: Berry Loire Puisaye

Government
  - Mayor (2020–2026): Didier Houdmon
- Area^{1}: 14.04 km^{2} (5.42 sq mi)
- Highest elevation: 176 m (577 ft)
- Lowest elevation: 159 m (522 ft)
- Population (2023): 64
  - Density: 4.6/km^{2} (12/sq mi)
- Time zone: UTC+01:00 (CET)
  - Summer (DST): UTC+02:00 (CEST)
- INSEE/Postal code: 45138 /45250
- ^{1} French Land Register data, which excludes lakes, ponds, glaciers > 1 km^{2} (0.386 sq mi or 247 acres) and river estuaries.

Escrignelles (French pronunciation: [ɛskʁiɲɛl]) is a commune in the Loiret department in north-central France.

== See also ==
- Communes of the Loiret department
