= Feins-en-Gâtinais =

- Commune
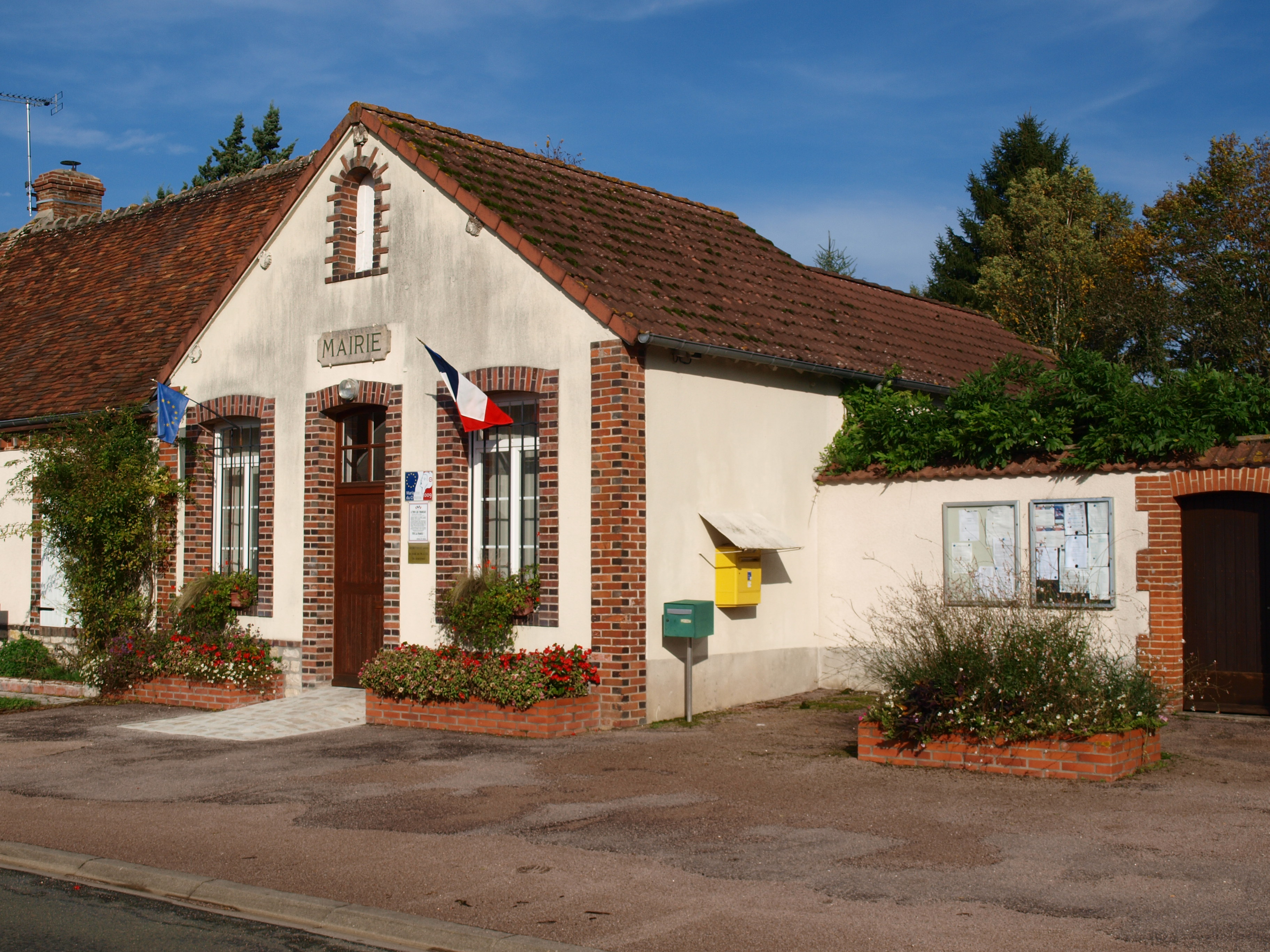
- The town hall in Feins-en-Gâtinais
- Location of Feins-en-Gâtinais
- Location within France Location within Centre-Val de Loire
- Coordinates: 47°44′47″N 2°50′28″E
- Country: France
- Region: Centre-Val de Loire
- Department: Loiret
- Arrondissement: Montargis
- Canton: Gien
- Intercommunality: CC Berry Loire Puisaye

Government
  - Mayor (2020–2026): Pierre Bodier
- Area^{1}: 11.89 km^{2} (4.59 sq mi)
- Highest elevation: 179 m (587 ft)
- Lowest elevation: 150 m (490 ft)
- Population (2023): 29
  - Density: 2.4/km^{2} (6.3/sq mi)
- Time zone: UTC+01:00 (CET)
  - Summer (DST): UTC+02:00 (CEST)
- INSEE/Postal code: 45143 /45230
- ^{1} French Land Register data, which excludes lakes, ponds, glaciers > 1 km^{2} (0.386 sq mi or 247 acres) and river estuaries.

Feins-en-Gâtinais is a commune in the Loiret department in north-central France.

== See also ==
- Communes of the Loiret department
