= Cernoy-en-Berry =

- Commune
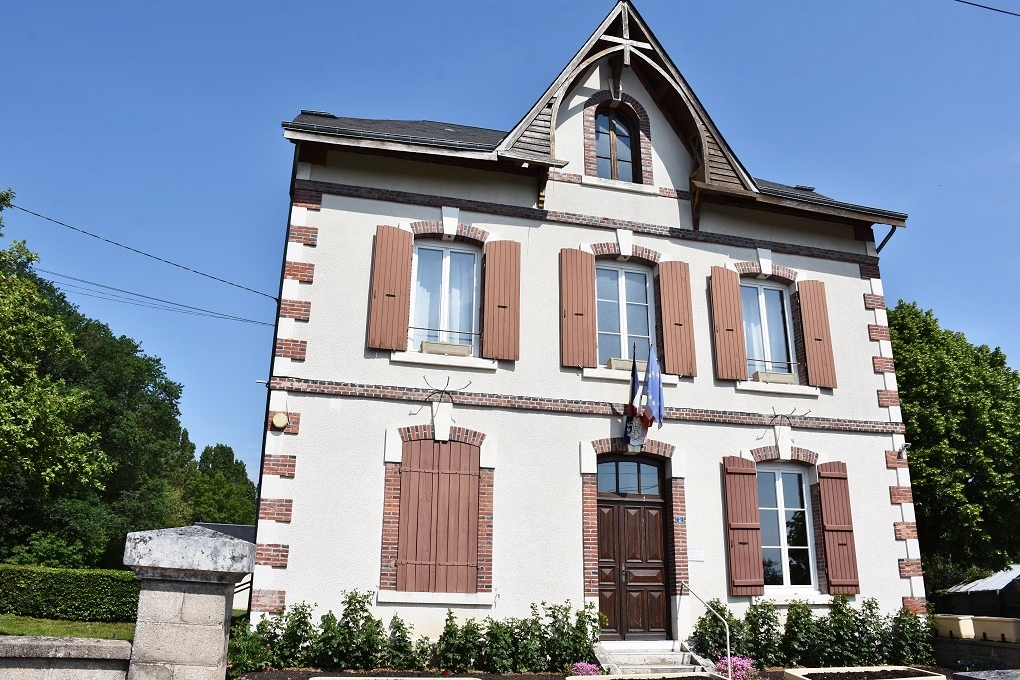
- Town hall

- Coat of arms
- Location of Cernoy-en-Berry
- Location within France Location within Centre-Val de Loire
- Coordinates: 47°32′27″N 2°39′43″E
- Country: France
- Region: Centre-Val de Loire
- Department: Loiret
- Arrondissement: Montargis
- Canton: Gien

Government
  - Mayor (2021–2026): Alexandre Brague
- Area^{1}: 28.23 km^{2} (10.90 sq mi)
- Highest elevation: 266 m (873 ft)
- Lowest elevation: 176 m (577 ft)
- Population (2023): 420
  - Density: 15/km^{2} (39/sq mi)
- Time zone: UTC+01:00 (CET)
  - Summer (DST): UTC+02:00 (CEST)
- INSEE/Postal code: 45064 /45340
- ^{1} French Land Register data, which excludes lakes, ponds, glaciers > 1 km^{2} (0.386 sq mi or 247 acres) and river estuaries.

Cernoy-en-Berry (French pronunciation: [sɛʁnwa ɑ̃ beʁi], literally Cernoy in Berry) is a commune in the Loiret department in north-central France.

== See also ==
- Communes of the Loiret department
