= La Bussière, Loiret =

La Bussière
- Commune
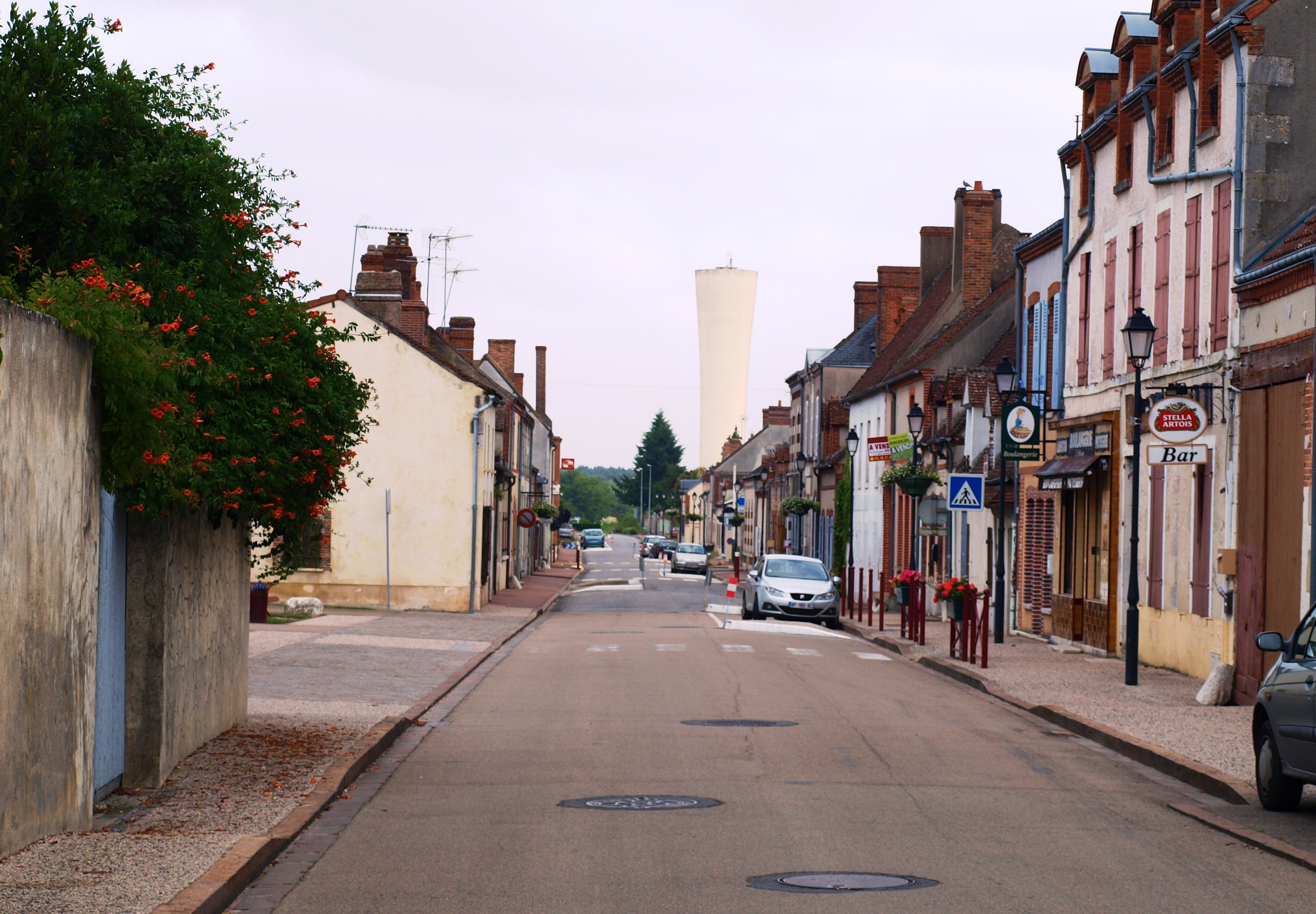
- The main road in La Bussière
- Location of La Bussière
- Location within France Location within Centre-Val de Loire
- Coordinates: 47°46′35″N 2°45′00″E
- Country: France
- Region: Centre-Val de Loire
- Department: Loiret
- Arrondissement: Montargis
- Canton: Gien
- Intercommunality: Berry Loire Puisaye

Government
  - Mayor (2020–2026): Dominique Geoffrenet
- Area^{1}: 35.23 km^{2} (13.60 sq mi)
- Highest elevation: 186 m (610 ft)
- Lowest elevation: 144 m (472 ft)
- Population (2023): 761
  - Density: 21.6/km^{2} (55.9/sq mi)
- Time zone: UTC+01:00 (CET)
  - Summer (DST): UTC+02:00 (CEST)
- INSEE/Postal code: 45060 /45230
- ^{1} French Land Register data, which excludes lakes, ponds, glaciers > 1 km^{2} (0.386 sq mi or 247 acres) and river estuaries.

La Bussière (French pronunciation: [la bysjɛʁ]) is a commune in the Loiret department in north-central France.

== Population ==
Historical population
Year	Pop.	±% p.a.
1968	531	—
1975	545	+0.37%
1982	644	+2.41%
1990	715	+1.32%
1999	749	+0.52%
2007	782	+0.54%
2012	807	+0.63%
2017	805	−0.05%
2023	761	−0.93%
Source: INSEE

== See also ==
- Communes of the Loiret department
