= Robert de La Rochefoucauld =

French resistant (1923–2012)

Robert de La Rochefoucauld Comte de La Rochefoucauld

Mayor of Ouzouer-sur-Trézée
- In office 1966–1996
- Succeeded by: Muriel Swynghedauw

Personal details
- Born: Robert Jean Marie de La Rochefoucauld; 16 September 1923 Paris, France
- Died: 8 May 2012 (aged 88) Ouzouer-sur-Trézée, France
- Spouse: Bernadette de Marcieu de Gontaut-Biron
- Children: 4
- Occupation: French Resistant; Special Operations Executive

Comte Robert Guy Jean-Marie de La Rochefoucauld (16 September 1923 – 8 May 2012) was a member of the French Resistance and the Special Operations Executive (SOE) during World War II, and later served as the mayor of Ouzouer-sur-Trézée, a canal town in the Loire Valley, for thirty years. In honour of his work for France and as a secret agent for the British during the war, La Rochefoucauld was awarded the orders Chevalier de la Légion d’Honneur, Croix de Guerre, Médaille de la Résistance and the British Distinguished Service Order and Distinguished Conduct Medal.

== Biography ==
=== Early life ===
Robert de La Rochefoucauld was born in Paris, one of 10 children in a family living in a fashionable area near the Eiffel Tower. His father, Olivier de La Rochefoucauld (1888–1965) (Wikidata – Wikidata Q109012067), and his mother, Jeanne-Marie Charlotte Solange Consuelo de Maillé de La Tour-Landry (1900–1991), the daughter of the Duke of Maillé, were members of the French nobility; he used the aristocratic title of count in his later years. He studied at private schools in Switzerland and Austria, and, at age 15, received a pat on the cheek from Adolf Hitler on a class visit to his Alpine retreat at Berchtesgaden.

=== World War II ===
==== French Resistance ====
La Rochefoucauld was 16 and a follower of Charles de Gaulle when Nazi Germany invaded France. His father was taken prisoner and he was also reported to the Gestapo so, with the help of the French Resistance, he took a pseudonym and fled to Spain in 1942, hoping to go on to England and link up with de Gaulle's movement. He escaped with two downed British airmen, who were also being sheltered by the underground. The Spanish authorities (under Francisco Franco) interned the three men in the prison camp Miranda de Ebro, but La Rochefoucauld pretended to be English and was delivered to the British Embassy during an organised evacuation.

The British, having secured the men's freedom, were so impressed with La Rochefoucauld's boldness and ingenuity that they asked him to join the Special Operations Executive (SOE), the clandestine unit which Prime Minister Winston Churchill created in 1940 to "set Europe ablaze", as he put it, by working with resistance groups on the German-occupied Continent. Received by Charles de Gaulle, he expressed his difficulty choosing between service in the SOE and the Free French Forces, and was encouraged to choose the SOE: "If it is for France, then go ahead."

==== Work for the SOE ====
The British flew La Rochefoucauld to London, where they trained him to jump out of aeroplanes, set off explosives and kill a man quickly using his hands. In June 1943 they parachuted him into France, where he destroyed an electric substation and blew up railroad tracks at Avallon, but was captured and condemned to death by the Nazis. While being taken for execution, he jumped from the back of his captors' truck, dodged bullets, then ran through nearby streets. He ended up outside a German headquarters, where he spotted a limousine flying a swastika flag, its driver nearby and the keys in the ignition. He drove off in the car and then caught a train to Paris, hiding in one of its bathrooms. The Daily Telegraph quoted him as saying, "When we arrived in Paris, I felt drunk with freedom." The SOE later evacuated him to England.

In May 1944, La Rochefoucauld parachuted back into France. Dressed as a workman, he smuggled explosives into a huge German munitions plant in Saint-Médard-en-Jalles, near Bordeaux. Over the course of the four-day mission, La Rochefoucauld, code-named "Sun", smuggled 40 kilos of explosives, concealed in hollowed-out loaves of bread and specially designed shoes, into the factory. He set off the explosives on 20 May and, after scaling a wall, fled on a bicycle. After sending a message to London (the reply read simply: "Félicitations"), he enjoyed several bottles with the local Resistance leader, waking the next day with a hangover.

However, La Rochefoucauld was soon imprisoned by the Germans once more in Fort du Hâ in Bordeaux. In his cell, he feigned an epileptic seizure, and, when a guard opened the door, hit him over the head with a table leg and then broke his neck. He took the guard's uniform and pistol, shot two other guards, and escaped. Desperate to avoid recapture, he contacted a French underground worker whose sister was a nun. He donned her habit and walked unobtrusively to the home of a more senior agent, who hid him. With D-Day imminent, La Rochefoucauld was not extracted back to London, choosing instead to stay in France to help the Resistance overthrow the Germans. He carried out dozens of sabotage and espionage missions throughout the Normandy campaign as the Allies pushed the Germans back to Berlin.

During one mission, he was captured by the Schutzstaffel and brought out to a field to be executed by firing squad, but before the Nazis could complete the execution, La Rochefoucauld's fellows in the Resistance took care of the Nazis' machine guns, buying La Rochefoucauld time to leave safely. His final behind-the-lines assault came in April 1945, when he led a night raid to knock out a casemate near Saint-Vivien-de-Médoc, on France's western coast at the mouth of the Gironde. Paddling up the river, he approached the casemate, killed a guard there, and blew it up, forcing the Germans to pull back to their final defensive position on the coast at Verdon. Shortly afterwards, his knee was injured in a mine explosion, forcing him to take a month's leave. After V-E Day, he made the trip to Berlin and was kissed on the mouth by Soviet Red Army officer Georgy Zhukov, then the commander of the Soviet zone of occupation; Zhukov had misheard his name as La Rochezhukov.

=== Work after the war ===
The SOE was disbanded in 1946. As an officer in the postwar French military, La Rochefoucauld trained French troops and conducted raids on the Việt Minh during the First Indochina War, as well as participating in the Suez Crisis, in which the French joined Britain and Israel against Egypt over control of the Suez Canal.

==== Mayor of Ouzouer-sur-Trézée ====
La Rochefoucauld was the mayor of Ouzouer-sur-Trézée for 30 years, from 1966 to 1996. His memoir, La Liberté, C'est Mon Plaisir, 1940-1946, was published in 2002.

==== Maurice Papon trial ====
In 1997, La Rochefoucauld testified on behalf of Maurice Papon, who was being tried on charges of deporting 1600 French Jews to their deaths in Nazi concentration camps while an official with France's wartime collaborationist Vichy government. La Rochefoucald told the court that Papon had risked his life to help the Resistance and the Allies. Papon was convicted of complicity in Nazi crimes against humanity but fled to Switzerland while appealing. He was arrested at a Gstaad hotel, where he had registered as Robert Rochefoucauld. One of Papon's lawyers said La Rochefoucauld had given his passport to Papon to help him escape. Papon died in 2007.

=== Death ===
The news of La Rochefoucauld's death at the age of 88 in Ouzouer-sur-Trézée emerged on 8 May 2012, first announced by his family in the French newspaper Le Figaro and then reported late in June in the British press.

== Discrepancies in La Rochefoucauld's account ==
Neither La Rochefoucauld nor his missions to France appear in the official history SOE in France, first published by Her Majesty's Stationery Office in 1966. His name has yet to be traced in the SOE archives, held at the National Archives in Kew. However, SOE in France is a history of F Section of SOE, whereas La Rochefoucauld was aligned with R/F section. Also, as much as seven eighths of the SOE records were lost in a fire in 1946 and paring down of files at the National Archives. In addition, French Army records make clear that La Rochefoucauld was known to be a saboteur with foreign training, and cite his secret British handler, code-named "Henri".

Further, a number of incidents described in La Rochefoucauld's autobiography conflict with other accounts and evidence. For example, although he said he sabotaged the explosives works at Saint-Médard-en-Jalles in May 1944, this target had already been successfully attacked by RAF Bomber Command three weeks earlier, on the night of 29/30 April. A report in The Times on 1 May described the raid's "unusually spectacular results" and how "colossal" explosions were heard half an hour after the bombing attack had finished. Evaluating the results shortly afterwards, an RAF photo-reconnaissance report confirmed that the target had been "heavily damaged": six large warehouse buildings had been wiped out; at least half of the smaller buildings were damaged or destroyed; the railway line into the plant had been "severed by direct hits at many points"; and three 90-foot craters were visible from the air. Such an important, large-scale demolition would have ranked at the top of SOE's achievements, but SOE's extensive examination of its own sabotage work, undertaken across France in 1945, does not mention it. Nor does SOE's detailed report on its activities in France, submitted in June 1946, just prior to its amalgamation by MI6, and written by an officer with an intimate knowledge of its operations, make any mention of La Rochefoucauld. However, an entry on page 75 refers to: "Corps Franc Georges – Attack on St. Medard powder works (out of action 15 days)", which calls into question the extent of damage from the RAF raid at the end of April 1944 as reported the following day in The Times. Nor do local archives in Saint-Médard report any extensive property damage for that date.

According to La Rochefoucauld, he was exfiltrated by submarine off the coast of Berck, near Calais, at the end of February 1944, yet according to official sources SOE conducted no sea operations east of Brittany during this period. Paul Kix's biography, The Saboteur, refers to Motor Gun Boat No. 502 as La Rochefoucauld's means of escaping France, although not through Calais.

On the subject of his recruitment, La Rochefoucauld mentions that Eric Piquet-Wicks, then deputy for SOE's RF Section, spotted his potential in Spain in late 1942, but Piquet-Wicks did not arrive in Spain until spring 1944, when he took up a more junior role in Madrid after recovering from tuberculosis. According to Kix, La Rochefoucauld met in Spain with Ambassador Samuel Hoare and met Piquet-Wicks later, in London.

A file on La Rochefoucauld held at the Service historique de la défense archives at Vincennes raises a further question mark: in an application to the French Forces of the Interior for recognition of his resistance activity, he did not indicate in his account of his service that he travelled to Spain or England or joined SOE or any other secret service. Given de Gaulle's unfavourable opinion of the British in general and the SOE in particular, La Rochefoucauld may have been reluctant to reveal past association with the British or SOE Section F.

== Honours ==
Among other distinctions, La Rochefoucauld was made a Chevalier de la Légion d’Honneur and awarded the Croix de Guerre, the Médaille de la Résistance, and the British Distinguished Conduct Medal and Distinguished Service Order.

== Personal life ==
La Rochefoucauld belonged to one of the oldest families of the French nobility, whose members included François de La Rochefoucauld, the author of a classic 17th-century book of maxims. La Rochefoucauld married Bernadette de Marcieu de Gontaut-Biron; they had one son and three daughters.

== Works ==
- Robert de La Rochefoucauld (2002). La Liberté, C'est Mon Plaisir, 1940-1946 (in French). Paris: Perrin. ISBN 9782262019846.
