= Ousson-sur-Loire =

- Commune
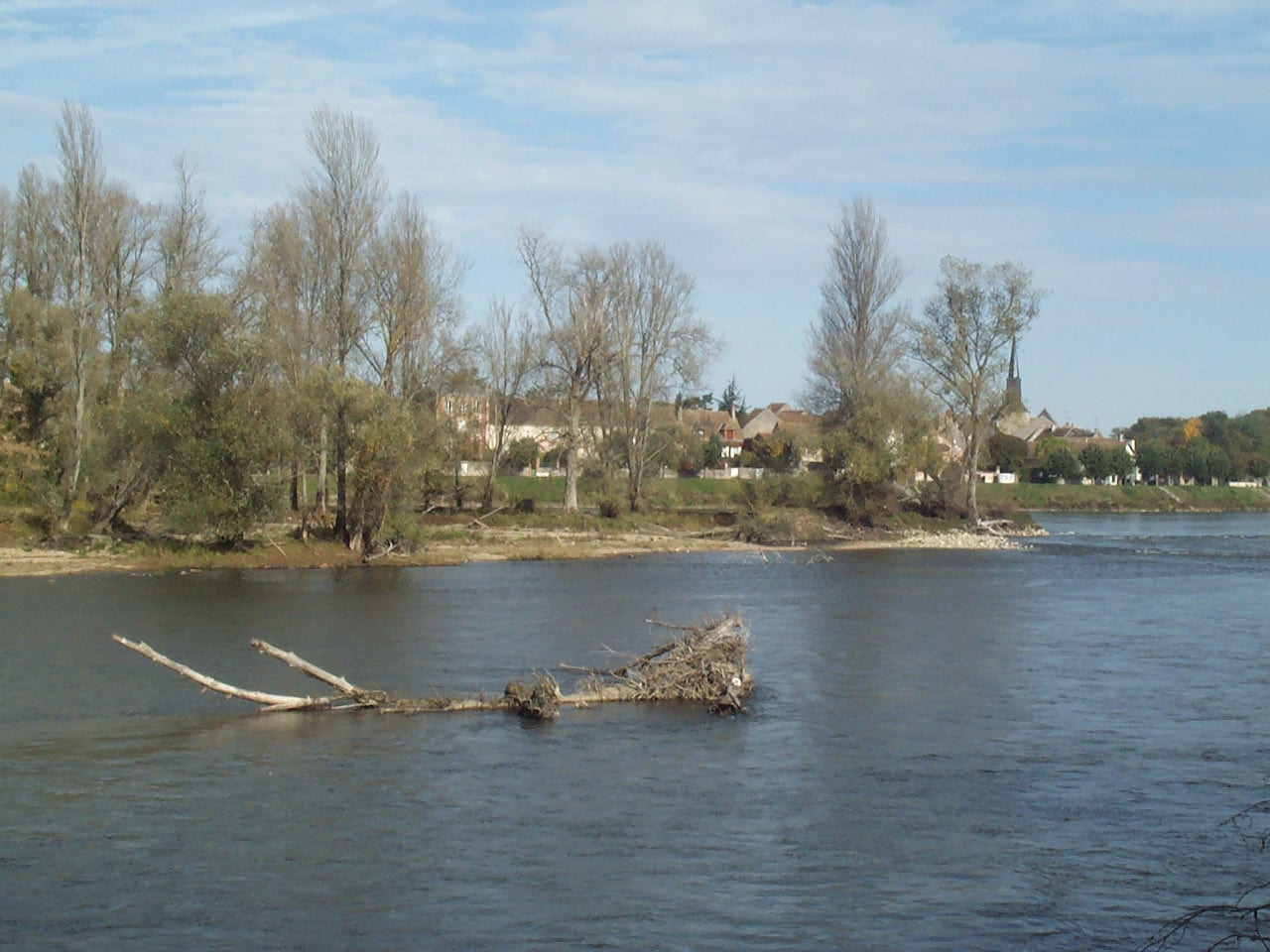
- Ousson-sur-Loire seen from the opposite river bank

- Coat of arms
- Location of Ousson-sur-Loire
- Location within France Location within Centre-Val de Loire
- Coordinates: 47°35′20″N 2°47′13″E
- Country: France
- Region: Centre-Val de Loire
- Department: Loiret
- Arrondissement: Montargis
- Canton: Gien
- Intercommunality: Berry Loire Puisaye

Government
  - Mayor (2020–2026): Didier Croissant
- Area^{1}: 5.35 km^{2} (2.07 sq mi)
- Highest elevation: 182 m (597 ft)
- Lowest elevation: 127 m (417 ft)
- Population (2023): 696
  - Density: 130/km^{2} (337/sq mi)
- Time zone: UTC+01:00 (CET)
  - Summer (DST): UTC+02:00 (CEST)
- INSEE/Postal code: 45238 /45250
- ^{1} French Land Register data, which excludes lakes, ponds, glaciers > 1 km^{2} (0.386 sq mi or 247 acres) and river estuaries.

Ousson-sur-Loire (French pronunciation: [usɔ̃ syʁ lwaʁ], literally Ousson on Loire) is a commune in the Loiret department in north-central France.

== See also ==
- Communes of the Loiret department
