= Breteau =

- Commune
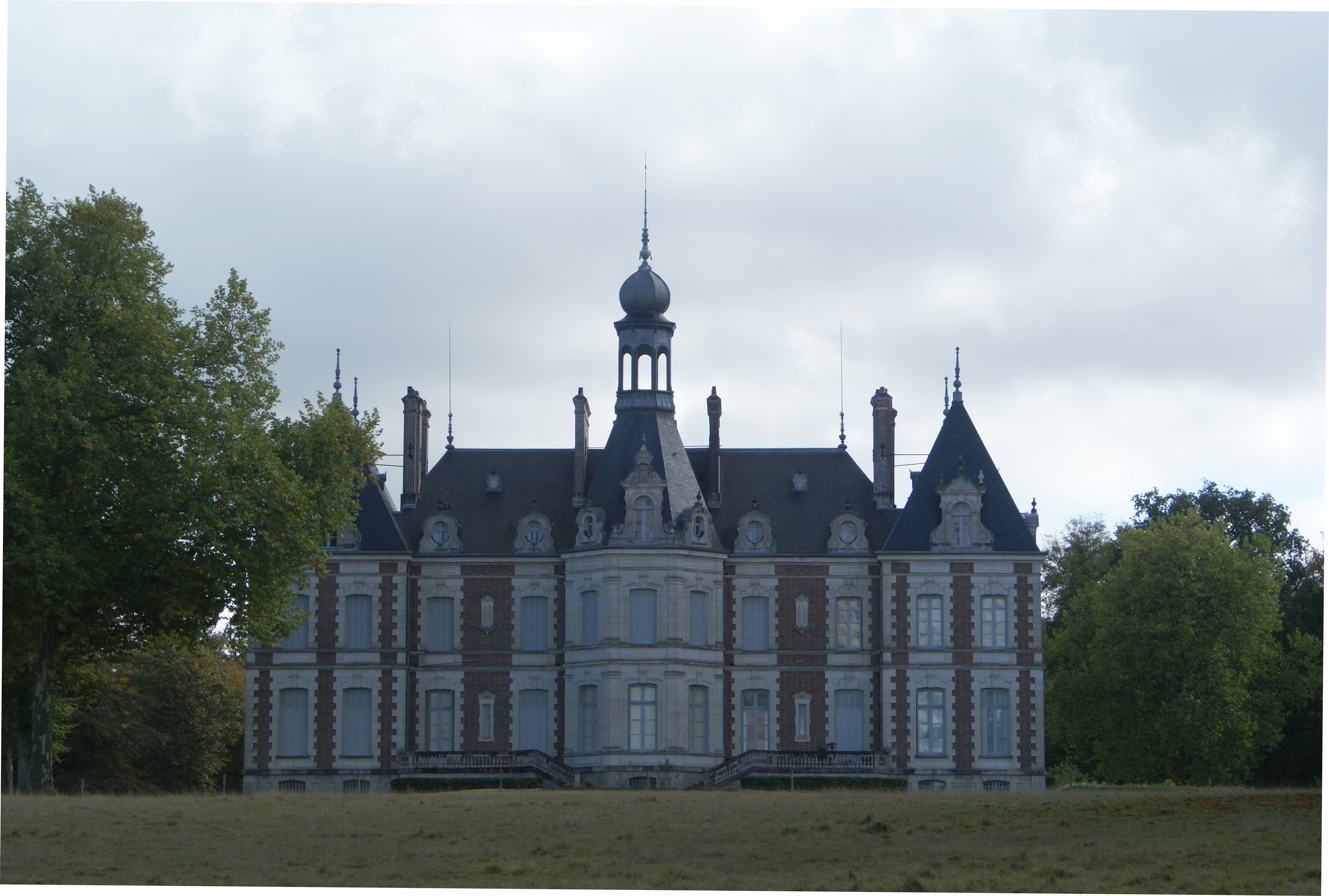
- The chateau in Breteau
- Location of Breteau
- Location within France Location within Centre-Val de Loire
- Coordinates: 47°40′58″N 2°53′36″E
- Country: France
- Region: Centre-Val de Loire
- Department: Loiret
- Arrondissement: Montargis
- Canton: Gien
- Intercommunality: Berry Loire Puisaye

Government
  - Mayor (2020–2026): René Thiebaut
- Area^{1}: 16.45 km^{2} (6.35 sq mi)
- Highest elevation: 189 m (620 ft)
- Lowest elevation: 157 m (515 ft)
- Population (2023): 90
  - Density: 5.5/km^{2} (14/sq mi)
- Time zone: UTC+01:00 (CET)
  - Summer (DST): UTC+02:00 (CEST)
- INSEE/Postal code: 45052 /45250
- ^{1} French Land Register data, which excludes lakes, ponds, glaciers > 1 km^{2} (0.386 sq mi or 247 acres) and river estuaries.

Breteau (French pronunciation: [bʁəto]) is a commune in the Loiret department in north-central France.

== Population ==
Historical population
Year	Pop.	±% p.a.
1968	161	—
1975	124	−3.66%
1982	97	−3.45%
1990	87	−1.35%
1999	82	−0.66%
2007	78	−0.62%
2012	74	−1.05%
2017	90	+3.99%
2023	90	+0.00%
Source: INSEE

== See also ==
- Communes of the Loiret department
