= Langesse =

- Commune
- Coat of arms
- Location of Langesse
- Location within France Location within Centre-Val de Loire
- Coordinates: 47°49′09″N 2°39′36″E
- Country: France
- Region: Centre-Val de Loire
- Department: Loiret
- Arrondissement: Montargis
- Canton: Gien
- Intercommunality: CC Giennoises

Government
  - Mayor (2020–2026): Nadège Corcelle
- Area^{1}: 8.97 km^{2} (3.46 sq mi)
- Highest elevation: 151 m (495 ft)
- Lowest elevation: 119 m (390 ft)
- Population (2023): 91
  - Density: 10/km^{2} (26/sq mi)
- Demonym: Langessois
- Time zone: UTC+01:00 (CET)
  - Summer (DST): UTC+02:00 (CEST)
- INSEE/Postal code: 45180 /45290
- ^{1} French Land Register data, which excludes lakes, ponds, glaciers > 1 km^{2} (0.386 sq mi or 247 acres) and river estuaries.

Langesse (French pronunciation: [lɑ̃ʒɛs]) is a commune in the Loiret department in north-central France.

== See also ==
- Communes of the Loiret department
