= Ouzouer-sur-Trézée =

- Commune
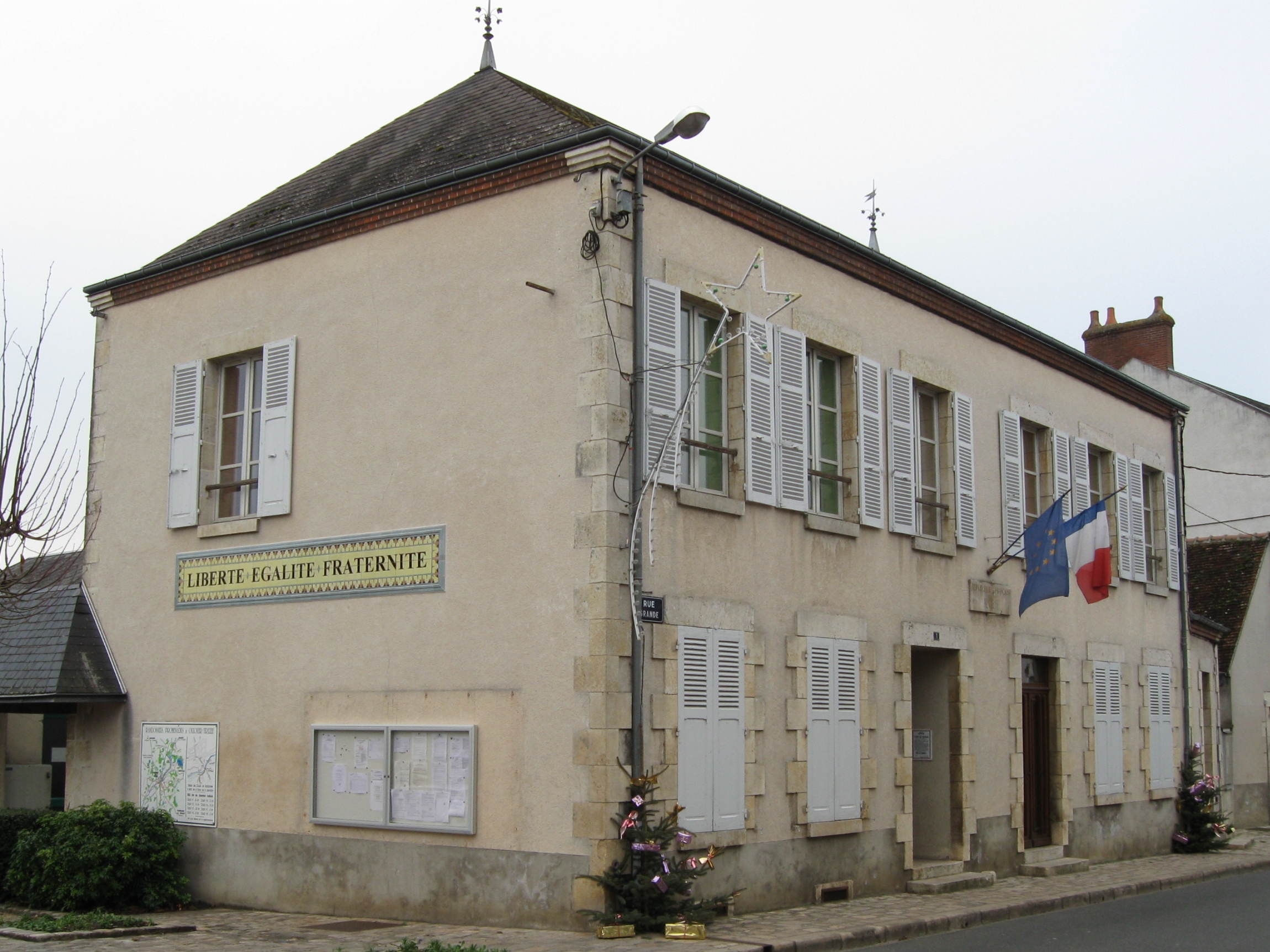
- Ouzouer-sur-Trézée town hall

- Coat of arms
- Location of Ouzouer-sur-Trézée
- Location within France Location within Centre-Val de Loire
- Coordinates: 47°40′20″N 2°48′31″E
- Country: France
- Region: Centre-Val de Loire
- Department: Loiret
- Arrondissement: Montargis
- Canton: Gien
- Intercommunality: Berry Loire Puisaye

Government
  - Mayor (2022–2026): Denis Gervais
- Area^{1}: 61.63 km^{2} (23.80 sq mi)
- Highest elevation: 185 m (607 ft)
- Lowest elevation: 137 m (449 ft)
- Population (2023): 1,125
  - Density: 18.25/km^{2} (47.28/sq mi)
- Time zone: UTC+01:00 (CET)
  - Summer (DST): UTC+02:00 (CEST)
- INSEE/Postal code: 45245 /45250
- ^{1} French Land Register data, which excludes lakes, ponds, glaciers > 1 km^{2} (0.386 sq mi or 247 acres) and river estuaries.

Ouzouer-sur-Trézée (French pronunciation: [uzwɛʁ syʁ tʁeze; uzwaʁ-]) is a commune of the Loiret department in north-central France. The Briare Canal and the river Trézée run through the town. A well-known mayor of the town was Count Robert de La Rochefoucauld, a fighter and spy for the French Resistance.

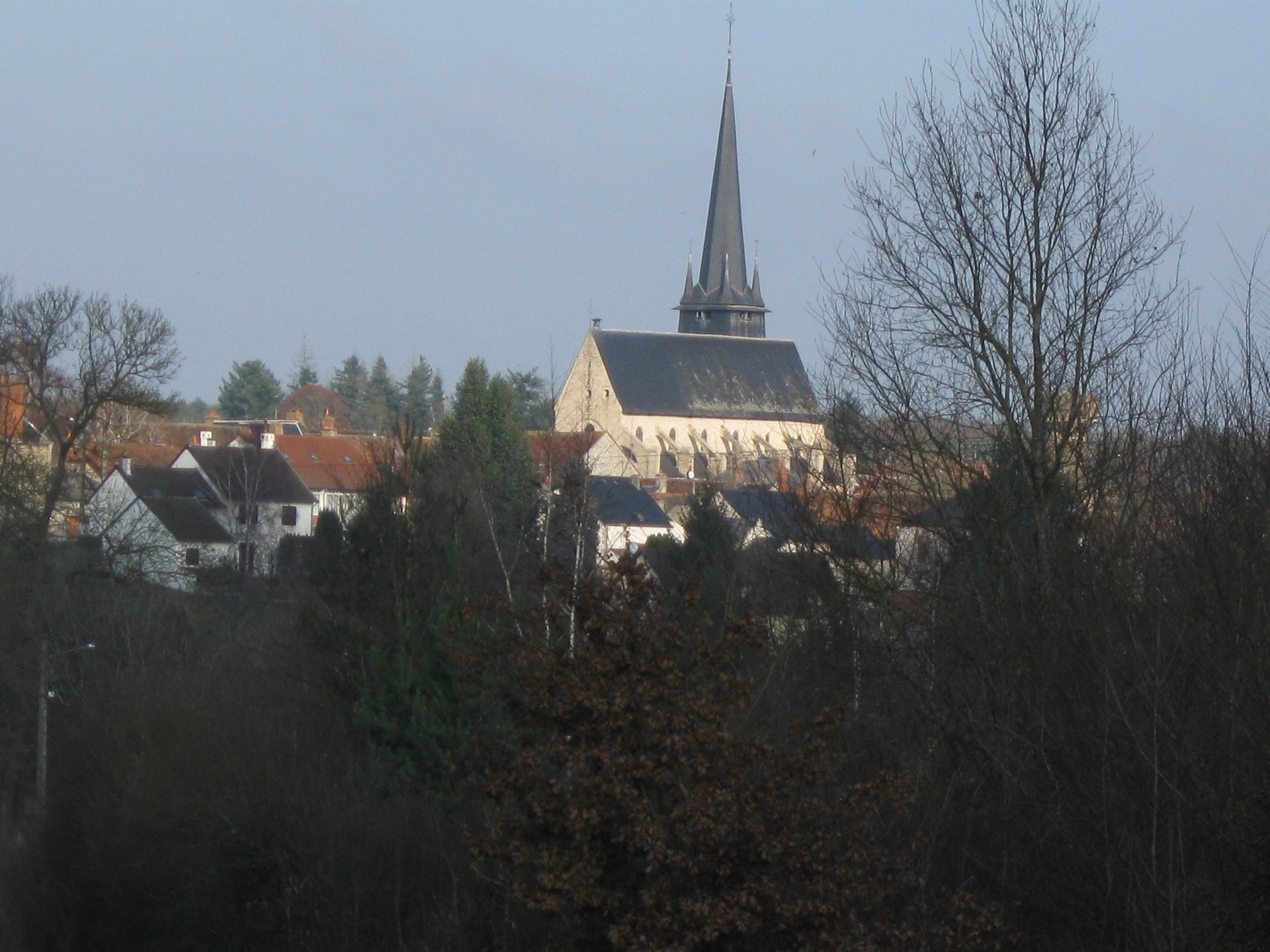
Ouzouer-sur-Trézée.

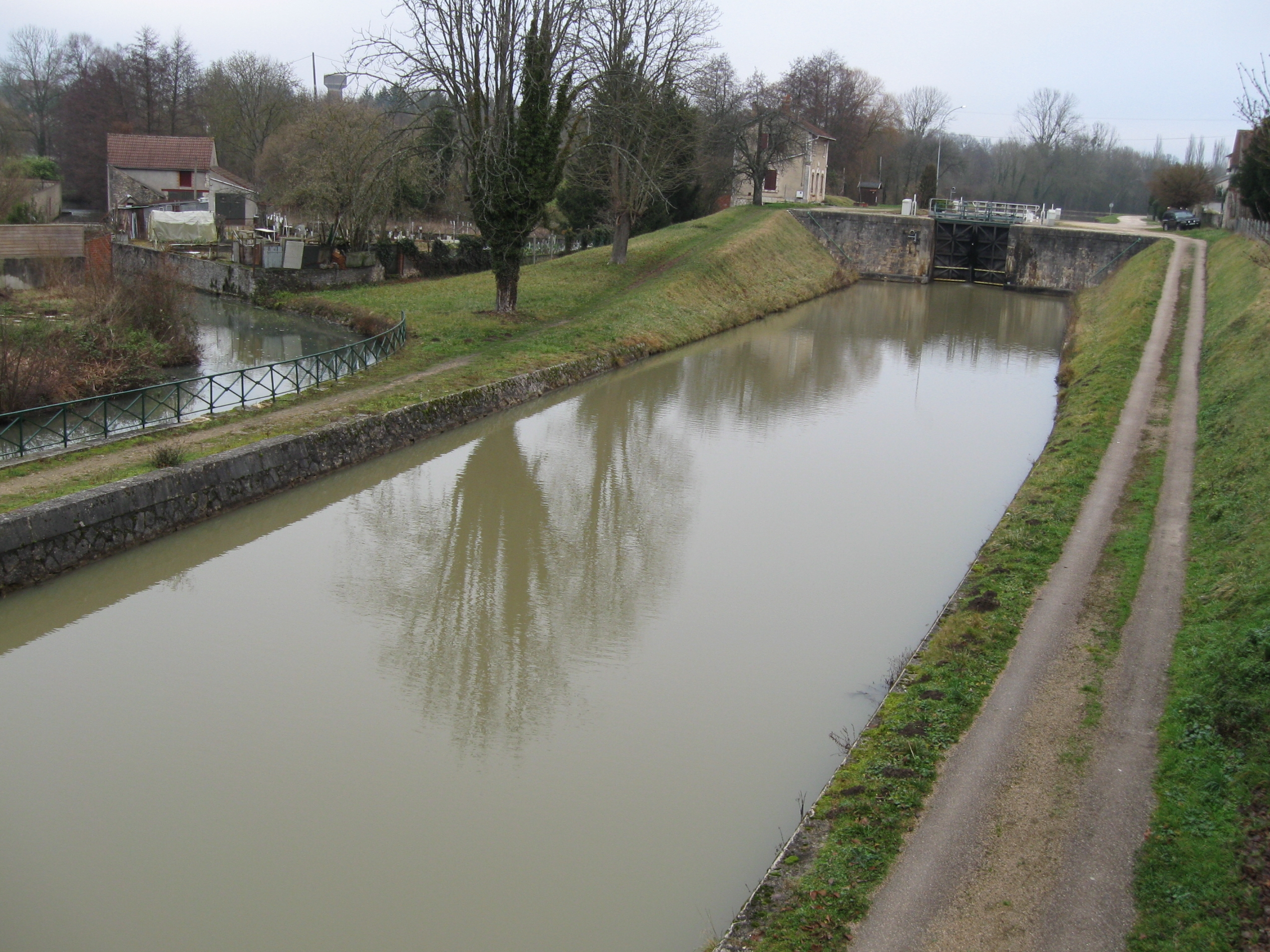
The Briare Canal in Ouzouer-sur-Trézée

== See also ==
- Communes of the Loiret department
