= Nevoy =

- Commune
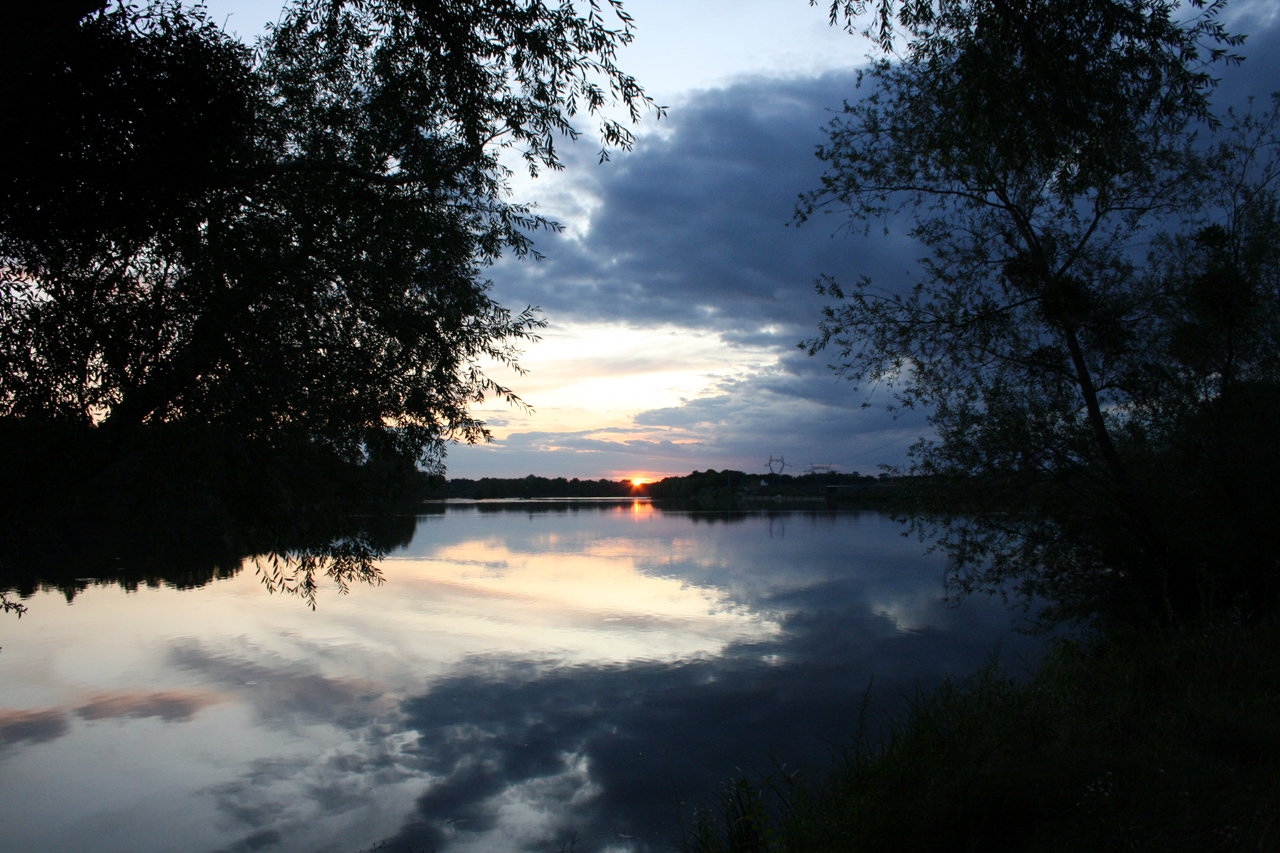
- Sunset over the Loire, at Nevoy
- Location of Nevoy
- Location within France Location within Centre-Val de Loire
- Coordinates: 47°42′44″N 2°35′00″E
- Country: France
- Region: Centre-Val de Loire
- Department: Loiret
- Arrondissement: Montargis
- Canton: Gien
- Intercommunality: CC Giennoises

Government
  - Mayor (2020–2026): Jean-François Darmois
- Area^{1}: 30.75 km^{2} (11.87 sq mi)
- Highest elevation: 160 m (520 ft)
- Lowest elevation: 117 m (384 ft)
- Population (2023): 1,163
  - Density: 37.82/km^{2} (97.96/sq mi)
- Demonym: Noveltins
- Time zone: UTC+01:00 (CET)
  - Summer (DST): UTC+02:00 (CEST)
- INSEE/Postal code: 45227 /45500
- ^{1} French Land Register data, which excludes lakes, ponds, glaciers > 1 km^{2} (0.386 sq mi or 247 acres) and river estuaries.

Nevoy (French pronunciation: [nəvwa]) is a commune in the Loiret department in north-central France. It is around 50 kilometres (30 mi) south-east of Orléans.

== See also ==
- Communes of the Loiret department
