= Adon, Loiret =

Adon
- Commune
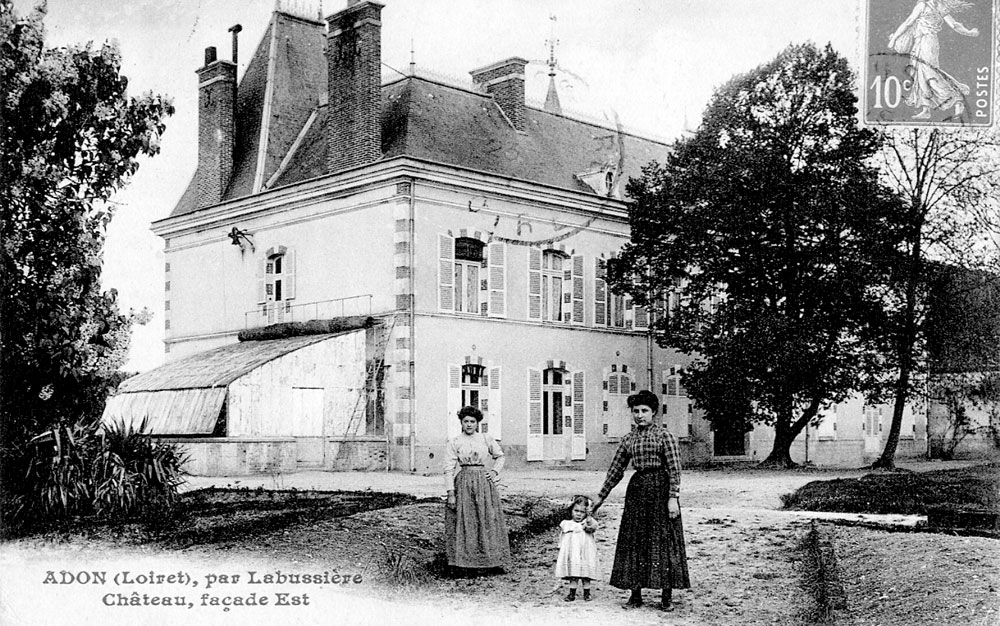
- Old postcard of the chateau

- Coat of arms
- Location of Adon
- Location within France Location within Centre-Val de Loire
- Coordinates: 47°45′50″N 2°47′47″E
- Country: France
- Region: Centre-Val de Loire
- Department: Loiret
- Arrondissement: Montargis
- Canton: Gien
- Intercommunality: Berry Loire Puisaye

Government
  - Mayor (2021–2026): Christine Parmisari
- Area^{1}: 24.65 km^{2} (9.52 sq mi)
- Highest elevation: 176 m (577 ft)
- Lowest elevation: 137 m (449 ft)
- Population (2023): 188
  - Density: 7.63/km^{2} (19.8/sq mi)
- Time zone: UTC+01:00 (CET)
  - Summer (DST): UTC+02:00 (CEST)
- INSEE/Postal code: 45001 /45230
- ^{1} French Land Register data, which excludes lakes, ponds, glaciers > 1 km^{2} (0.386 sq mi or 247 acres) and river estuaries.

Adon (French pronunciation: [adɔ̃]) is a commune in the Loiret department in north-central France.

== Population ==
The town's residents are called Adonnais in French.

Historical population
Year	Pop.	±% p.a.
1968	285	—
1975	247	−2.02%
1982	211	−2.23%
1990	189	−1.37%
1999	198	+0.52%
2007	169	−1.96%
2012	196	+3.01%
2017	220	+2.34%
2023	188	−2.59%
Source: INSEE

== See also ==
- Communes of the Loiret department
