= Dammarie-en-Puisaye =

- Commune
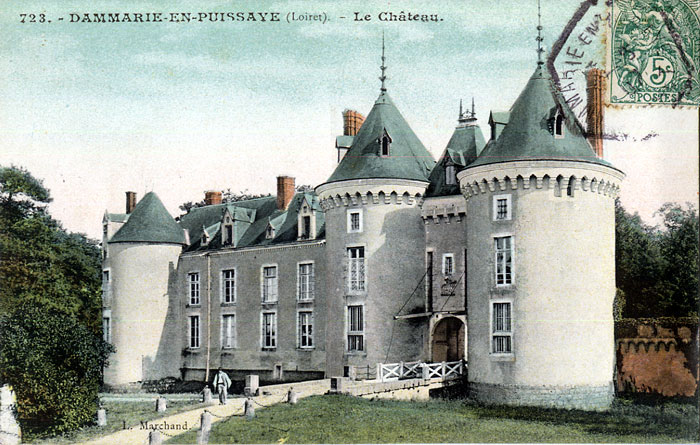
- An old postcard view of the château

- Coat of arms
- Location of Dammarie-en-Puisaye
- Location within France Location within Centre-Val de Loire
- Coordinates: 47°37′38″N 2°52′23″E
- Country: France
- Region: Centre-Val de Loire
- Department: Loiret
- Arrondissement: Montargis
- Canton: Gien
- Intercommunality: Berry Loire Puisaye

Government
  - Mayor (2020–2026): Nathalie Dony
- Area^{1}: 25.89 km^{2} (10.00 sq mi)
- Highest elevation: 192 m (630 ft)
- Lowest elevation: 152 m (499 ft)
- Population (2023): 171
  - Density: 6.60/km^{2} (17.1/sq mi)
- Time zone: UTC+01:00 (CET)
  - Summer (DST): UTC+02:00 (CEST)
- INSEE/Postal code: 45120 /45420
- ^{1} French Land Register data, which excludes lakes, ponds, glaciers > 1 km^{2} (0.386 sq mi or 247 acres) and river estuaries.

Dammarie-en-Puisaye (French pronunciation: [damaʁi ɑ̃ pɥizɛ]) is a commune in the Loiret department in north-central France, in the historical region of Puisaye.

== See also ==
- Communes of the Loiret department
