= Faverelles =

- Commune
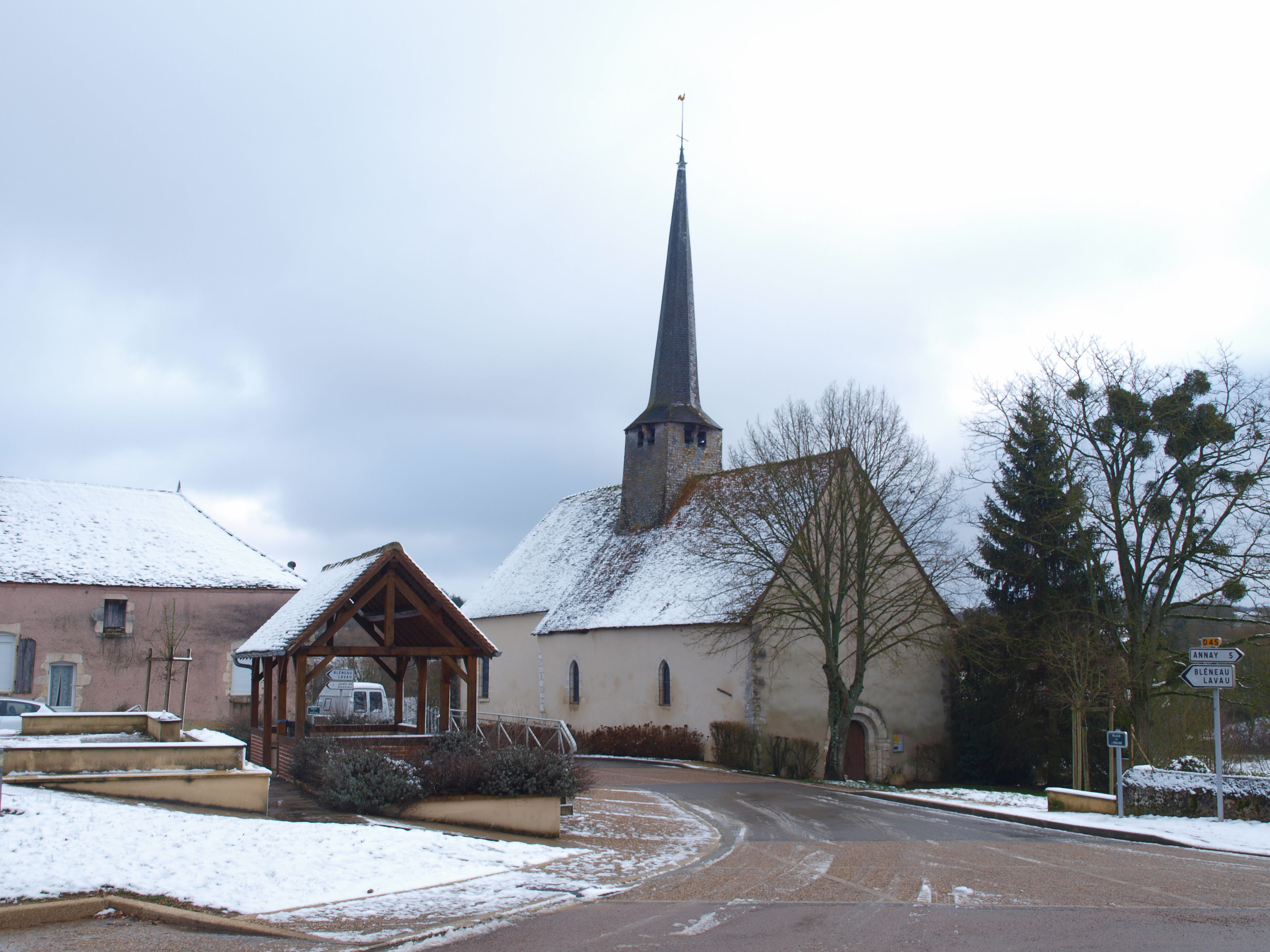
- The church in Faverelles
- Location of Faverelles
- Location within France Location within Centre-Val de Loire
- Coordinates: 47°34′33″N 2°55′57″E
- Country: France
- Region: Centre-Val de Loire
- Department: Loiret
- Arrondissement: Montargis
- Canton: Gien
- Intercommunality: Berry Loire Puisaye

Government
  - Mayor (2020–2026): Jacques Eugene
- Area^{1}: 18.92 km^{2} (7.31 sq mi)
- Highest elevation: 228 m (748 ft)
- Lowest elevation: 156 m (512 ft)
- Population (2023): 184
  - Density: 9.73/km^{2} (25.2/sq mi)
- Demonym: Faverellois
- Time zone: UTC+01:00 (CET)
  - Summer (DST): UTC+02:00 (CEST)
- INSEE/Postal code: 45141 /45420
- ^{1} French Land Register data, which excludes lakes, ponds, glaciers > 1 km^{2} (0.386 sq mi or 247 acres) and river estuaries.

Faverelles (French pronunciation: [favʁɛl]) is a commune in the Loiret department in north-central France.

== See also ==
- Communes of the Loiret department
