= Champoulet =

- Commune
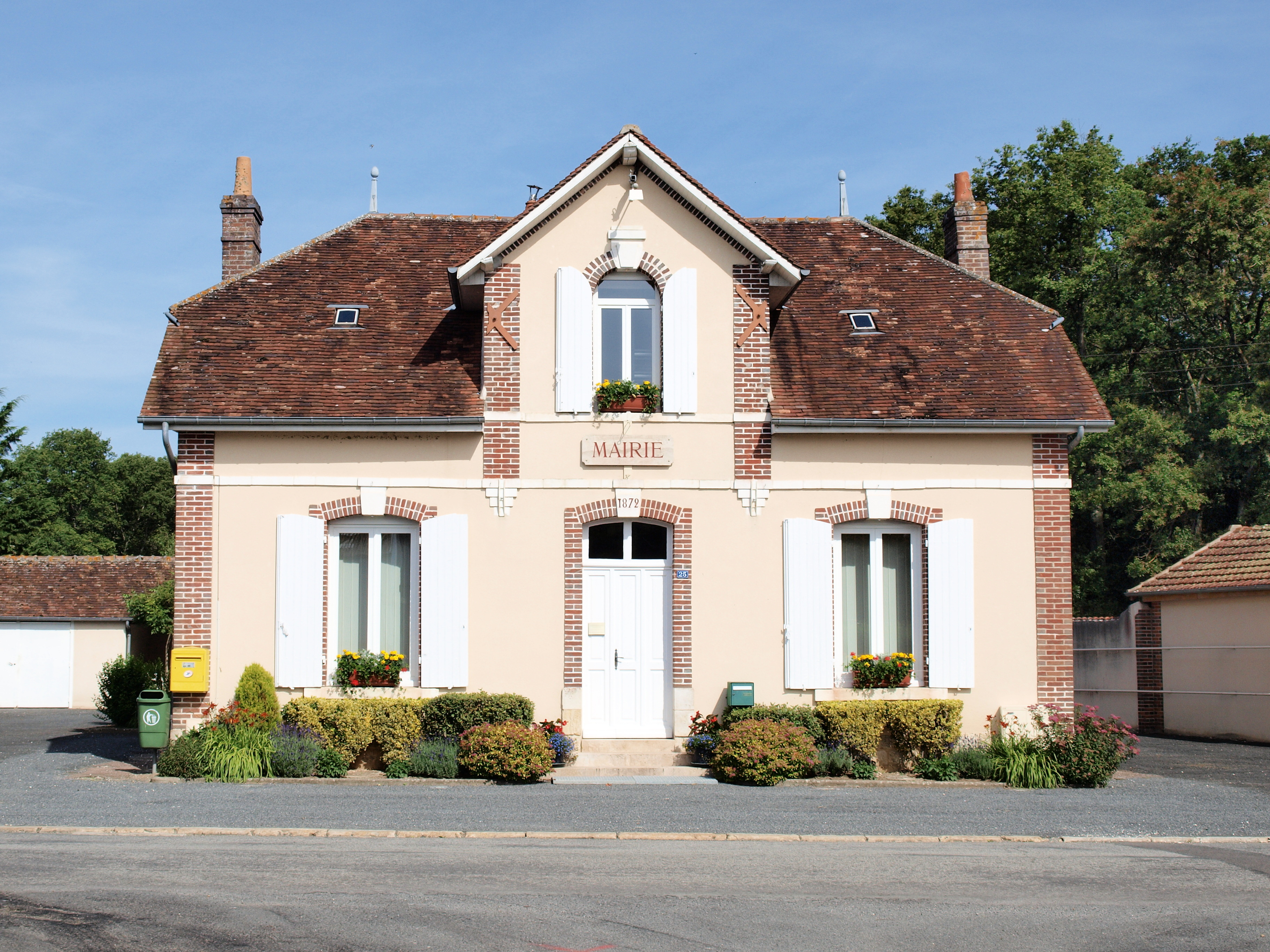
- Town hall
- Location of Champoulet
- Location within France Location within Centre-Val de Loire
- Coordinates: 47°39′31″N 2°55′14″E
- Country: France
- Region: Centre-Val de Loire
- Department: Loiret
- Arrondissement: Montargis
- Canton: Gien
- Intercommunality: Berry Loire Puisaye

Government
  - Mayor (2024–2026): Fabrice Lahousse
- Area^{1}: 9.36 km^{2} (3.61 sq mi)
- Highest elevation: 211 m (692 ft)
- Lowest elevation: 169 m (554 ft)
- Population (2023): 45
  - Density: 4.8/km^{2} (12/sq mi)
- Demonym: Champoulois
- Time zone: UTC+01:00 (CET)
  - Summer (DST): UTC+02:00 (CEST)
- INSEE/Postal code: 45070 /45420
- ^{1} French Land Register data, which excludes lakes, ponds, glaciers > 1 km^{2} (0.386 sq mi or 247 acres) and river estuaries.

Champoulet (French pronunciation: [ʃɑ̃pulɛ]) is a commune in the Loiret department in north-central France.

== See also ==
- Communes of the Loiret department
