= Les Choux =

- Commune
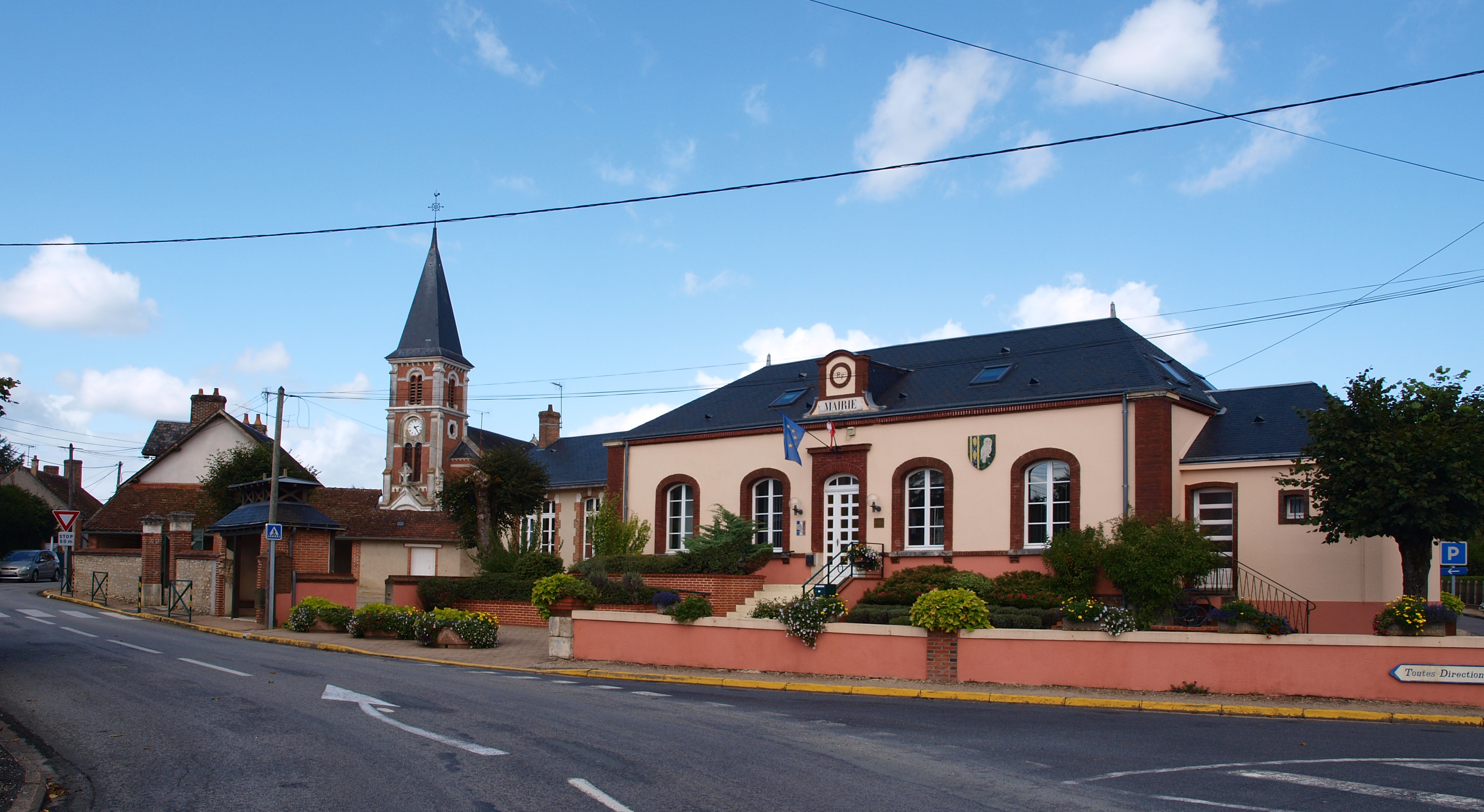
- The town hall and church tower in Les Choux

- Coat of arms
- Location of Les Choux
- Location within France Location within Centre-Val de Loire
- Coordinates: 47°47′53″N 2°40′35″E
- Country: France
- Region: Centre-Val de Loire
- Department: Loiret
- Arrondissement: Montargis
- Canton: Gien

Government
  - Mayor (2020–2026): Olivier Morel
- Area^{1}: 33.36 km^{2} (12.88 sq mi)
- Elevation: 145 m (476 ft)
- Highest elevation: 177 m (581 ft)
- Lowest elevation: 123 m (404 ft)
- Population (2023): 530
  - Density: 16/km^{2} (41/sq mi)
- Time zone: UTC+01:00 (CET)
  - Summer (DST): UTC+02:00 (CEST)
- INSEE/Postal code: 45096 /45290
- ^{1} French Land Register data, which excludes lakes, ponds, glaciers > 1 km^{2} (0.386 sq mi or 247 acres) and river estuaries.

Les Choux (French pronunciation: [le ʃu]) is a commune in the Loiret department in north-central France.

== See also ==
- Communes of the Loiret department
