= Saint-Firmin-sur-Loire =

- Commune
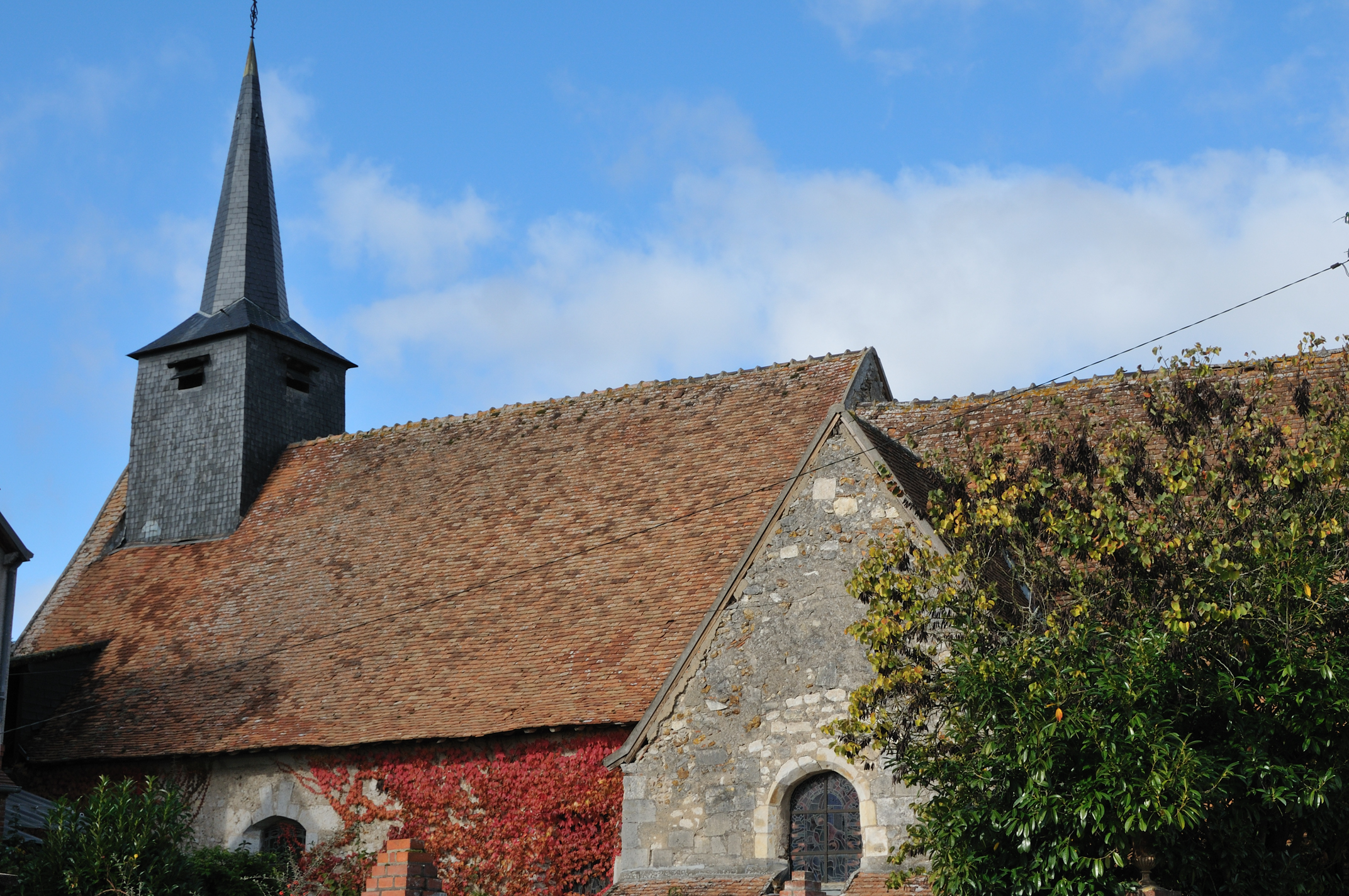
- The church in Saint-Firmin-sur-Loire
- Location of Saint-Firmin-sur-Loire
- Location within France Location within Centre-Val de Loire
- Coordinates: 47°37′36″N 2°43′59″E
- Country: France
- Region: Centre-Val de Loire
- Department: Loiret
- Arrondissement: Montargis
- Canton: Gien

Government
  - Mayor (2020–2026): Sylvie Blouet
- Area^{1}: 24.76 km^{2} (9.56 sq mi)
- Elevation: 131 m (430 ft)
- Highest elevation: 234 m (768 ft)
- Lowest elevation: 126 m (413 ft)
- Population (2023): 508
  - Density: 20.5/km^{2} (53.1/sq mi)
- Time zone: UTC+01:00 (CET)
  - Summer (DST): UTC+02:00 (CEST)
- INSEE/Postal code: 45276 /45360
- ^{1} French Land Register data, which excludes lakes, ponds, glaciers > 1 km^{2} (0.386 sq mi or 247 acres) and river estuaries.

Saint-Firmin-sur-Loire (French pronunciation: [sɛ̃ fiʁmɛ̃ syʁ lwaʁ], literally Saint-Firmin on Loire) is a commune in the Loiret department in north-central France.

== See also ==
- Communes of the Loiret department
