= Boismorand =

- Commune
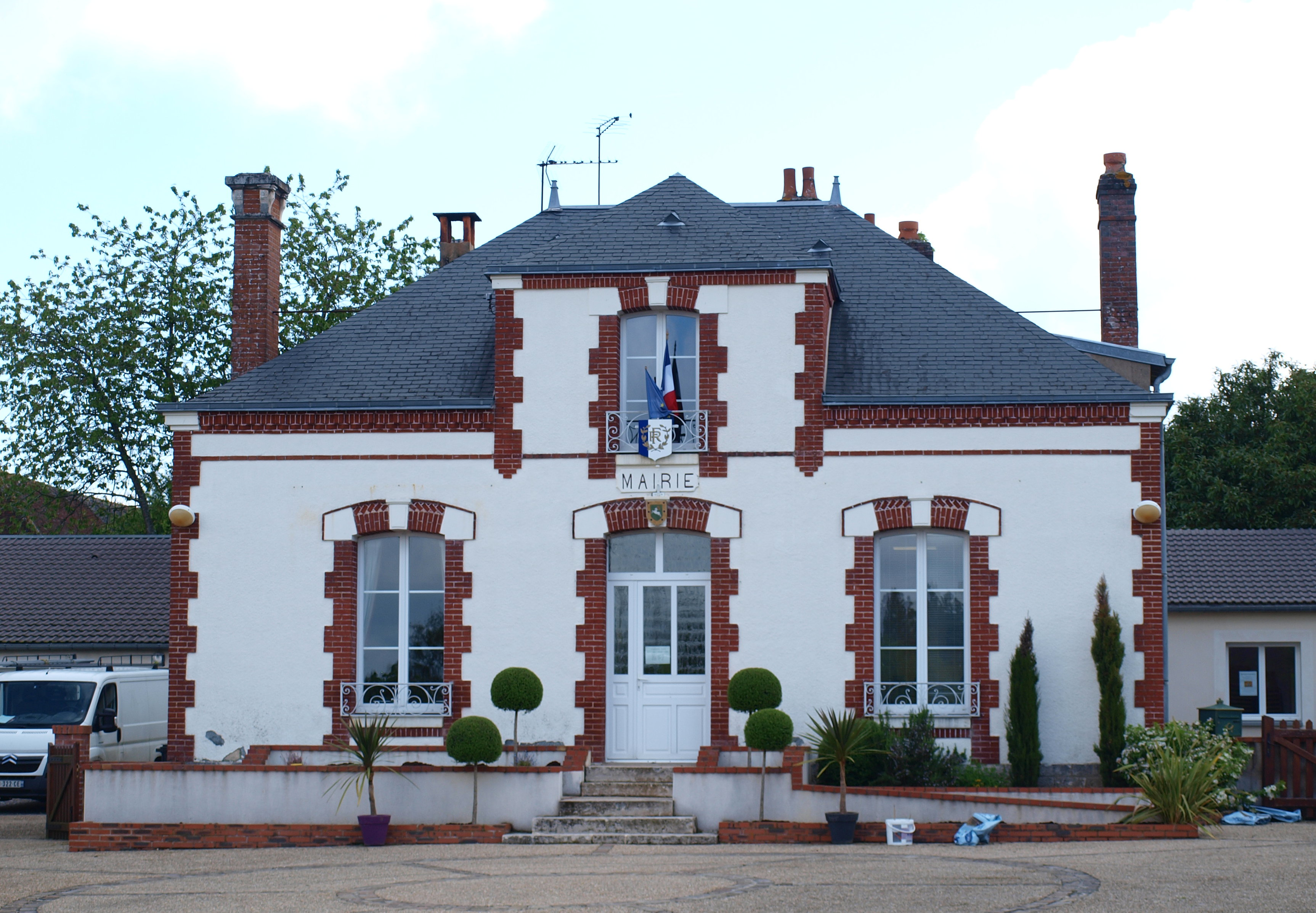
- Boismorand Town Hall

- Coat of arms
- Location of Boismorand
- Location within France Location within Centre-Val de Loire
- Coordinates: 47°47′13″N 2°43′10″E
- Country: France
- Region: Centre-Val de Loire
- Department: Loiret
- Arrondissement: Montargis
- Canton: Gien

Government
  - Mayor (2020–2026): Philippe Tagot
- Area^{1}: 25.15 km^{2} (9.71 sq mi)
- Highest elevation: 176 m (577 ft)
- Lowest elevation: 128 m (420 ft)
- Population (2023): 860
  - Density: 34/km^{2} (89/sq mi)
- Time zone: UTC+01:00 (CET)
  - Summer (DST): UTC+02:00 (CEST)
- INSEE/Postal code: 45036 /45290
- ^{1} French Land Register data, which excludes lakes, ponds, glaciers > 1 km^{2} (0.386 sq mi or 247 acres) and river estuaries.

Boismorand (French pronunciation: [bwamɔʁɑ̃]) is a commune in the Loiret department in the Centre-Val de Loire region in central-north France.

== Demographics ==
Historical population
Year	Pop.	±% p.a.
1968	219	—
1975	203	−1.08%
1982	466	+12.60%
1990	574	+2.64%
1999	590	+0.31%
2007	768	+3.35%
2012	881	+2.78%
2017	815	−1.55%
2023	860	+0.90%
Source: INSEE

== See also ==
- Communes of the Loiret department
