= Thou, Loiret =

Thou
- Commune
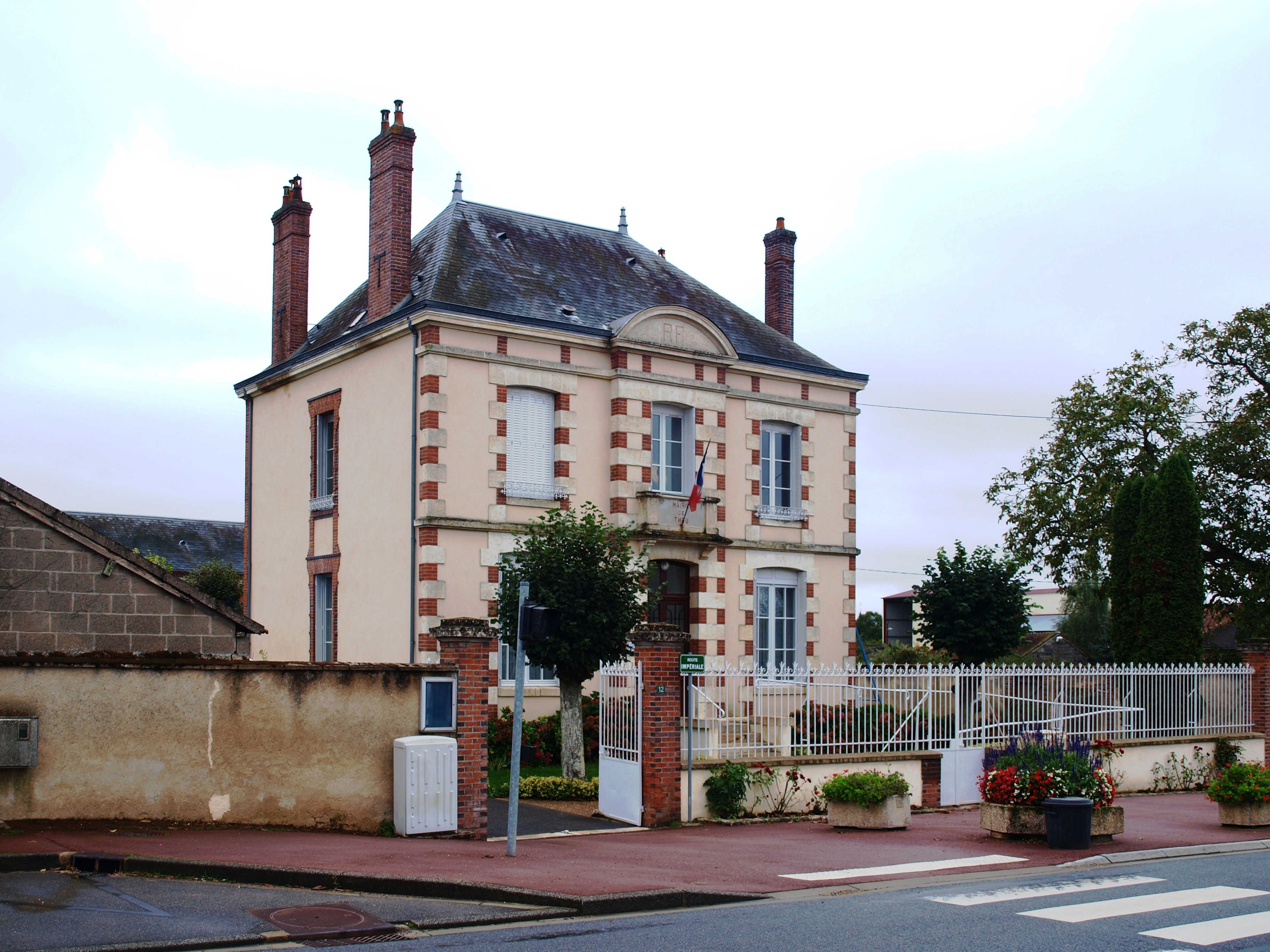
- The town hall in Thou
- Location of Thou
- Location within France Location within Centre-Val de Loire
- Coordinates: 47°34′51″N 2°54′40″E
- Country: France
- Region: Centre-Val de Loire
- Department: Loiret
- Arrondissement: Montargis
- Canton: Gien
- Intercommunality: Berry Loire Puisaye

Government
  - Mayor (2020–2026): Blandine Lechauve
- Area^{1}: 15.16 km^{2} (5.85 sq mi)
- Highest elevation: 196 m (643 ft)
- Lowest elevation: 143 m (469 ft)
- Population (2023): 211
  - Density: 13.9/km^{2} (36.0/sq mi)
- Time zone: UTC+01:00 (CET)
  - Summer (DST): UTC+02:00 (CEST)
- INSEE/Postal code: 45323 /45420
- ^{1} French Land Register data, which excludes lakes, ponds, glaciers > 1 km^{2} (0.386 sq mi or 247 acres) and river estuaries.

Thou (French pronunciation: [tu]) is a commune in the Loiret department of the Centre-Val de Loire region in north-central France.

== Architecture ==
Despite its size, Thou features many castles of various centuries:

- Le château de la Chaise
- Le château de Linière
- Le château de Thou
- Le château du Puys

== Economy ==
As a rural commune, Thou is strongly agricultural with cattle and poultry farming and cereal crops. There is also a hôtel-restaurant, a garage and most importantly a local metalwork industry, Thou Industrie / Beaulieu Industrie.

== See also ==
- Communes of the Loiret department
