= Canton of Gien =

Coordinates: 47.69°N 2.63°E

The canton of Gien is an administrative division of the Loiret department, central France. Its borders were modified at the French canton reorganisation which came into effect in March 2015. Its seat is in Gien.

It consists of the following communes:

1. Adon
2. Autry-le-Châtel
3. Batilly-en-Puisaye
4. Beaulieu-sur-Loire
5. Boismorand
6. Bonny-sur-Loire
7. Breteau
8. Briare
9. La Bussière
10. Cernoy-en-Berry
11. Champoulet
12. Châtillon-sur-Loire
13. Les Choux
14. Dammarie-en-Puisaye
15. Escrignelles
16. Faverelles
17. Feins-en-Gâtinais
18. Gien
19. Langesse
20. Le Moulinet-sur-Solin
21. Nevoy
22. Ousson-sur-Loire
23. Ouzouer-sur-Trézée
24. Pierrefitte-ès-Bois
25. Saint-Firmin-sur-Loire
26. Thou
