= Beaulieu-sur-Loire =

- Commune
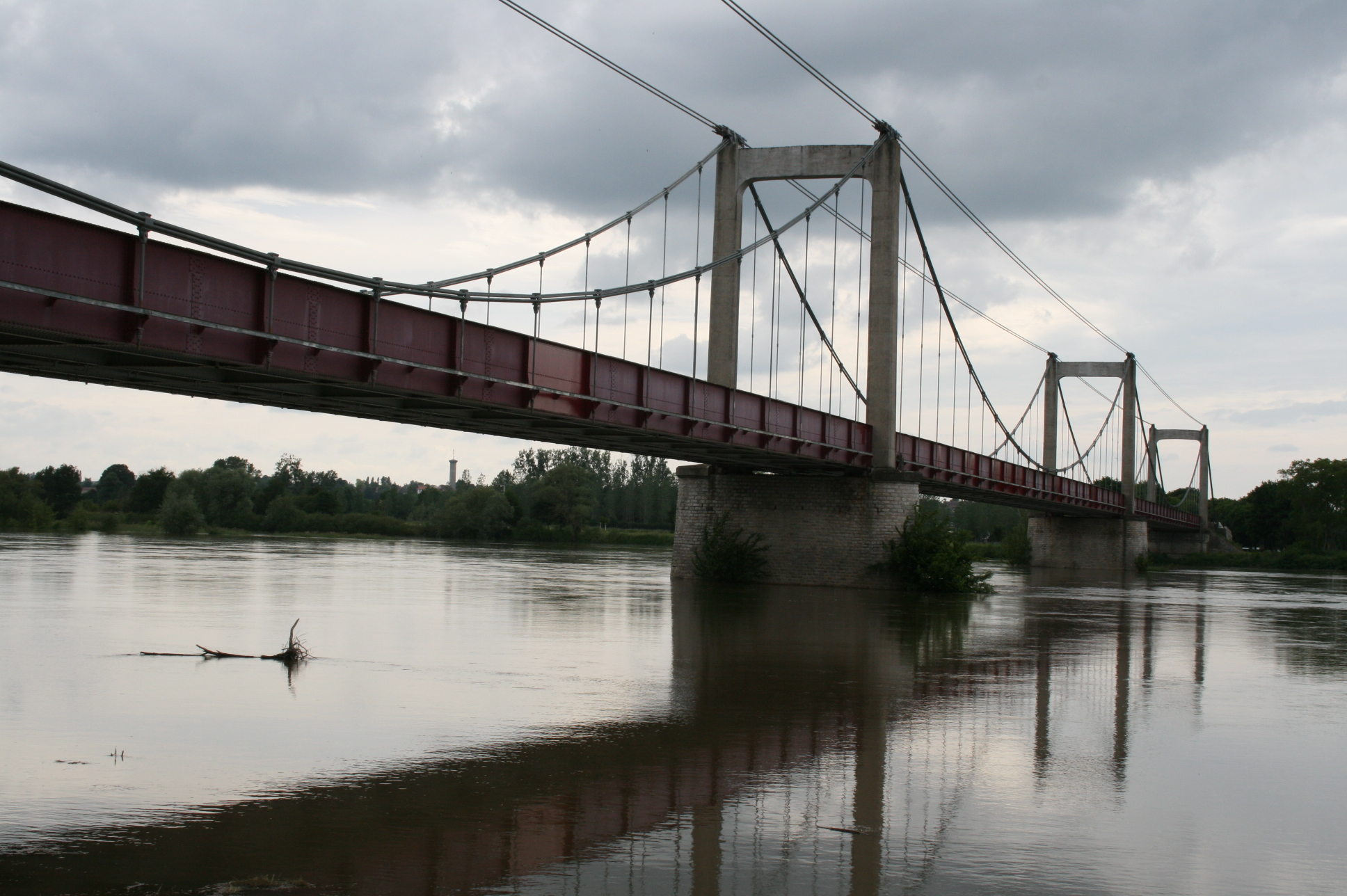
- The suspension bridge

- Coat of arms
- Location of Beaulieu-sur-Loire
- Location within France Location within Centre-Val de Loire
- Coordinates: 47°32′36″N 2°49′04″E
- Country: France
- Region: Centre-Val de Loire
- Department: Loiret
- Arrondissement: Montargis
- Canton: Gien
- Intercommunality: Berry Loire Puisaye

Government
  - Mayor (2020–2026): Jacky Hecquet
- Area^{1}: 48.83 km^{2} (18.85 sq mi)
- Highest elevation: 260 m (850 ft)
- Lowest elevation: 130 m (430 ft)
- Population (2023): 1,734
  - Density: 35.51/km^{2} (91.97/sq mi)
- Time zone: UTC+01:00 (CET)
  - Summer (DST): UTC+02:00 (CEST)
- INSEE/Postal code: 45029 /45630
- ^{1} French Land Register data, which excludes lakes, ponds, glaciers > 1 km^{2} (0.386 sq mi or 247 acres) and river estuaries.

Beaulieu-sur-Loire (French pronunciation: [boljø syʁ lwaʁ], literally Beaulieu on Loire, before 1988: Beaulieu) is a commune in the Loiret department in north-central France. It is the place of death of Jacques MacDonald, a French general who served in the Napoleonic Wars.

== Population ==
Historical population
Year	Pop.	±% p.a.
1968	1,538	—
1975	1,525	−0.12%
1982	1,502	−0.22%
1990	1,644	+1.14%
1999	1,693	+0.33%
2007	1,756	+0.46%
2012	1,804	+0.54%
2017	1,815	+0.12%
2023	1,734	−0.76%
Source: INSEE

== See also ==
- Communes of the Loiret department
