= Bourras Abbey =

Abbey in Nièvre, France

Coordinates: 47°17′45″N 3°17′50″E

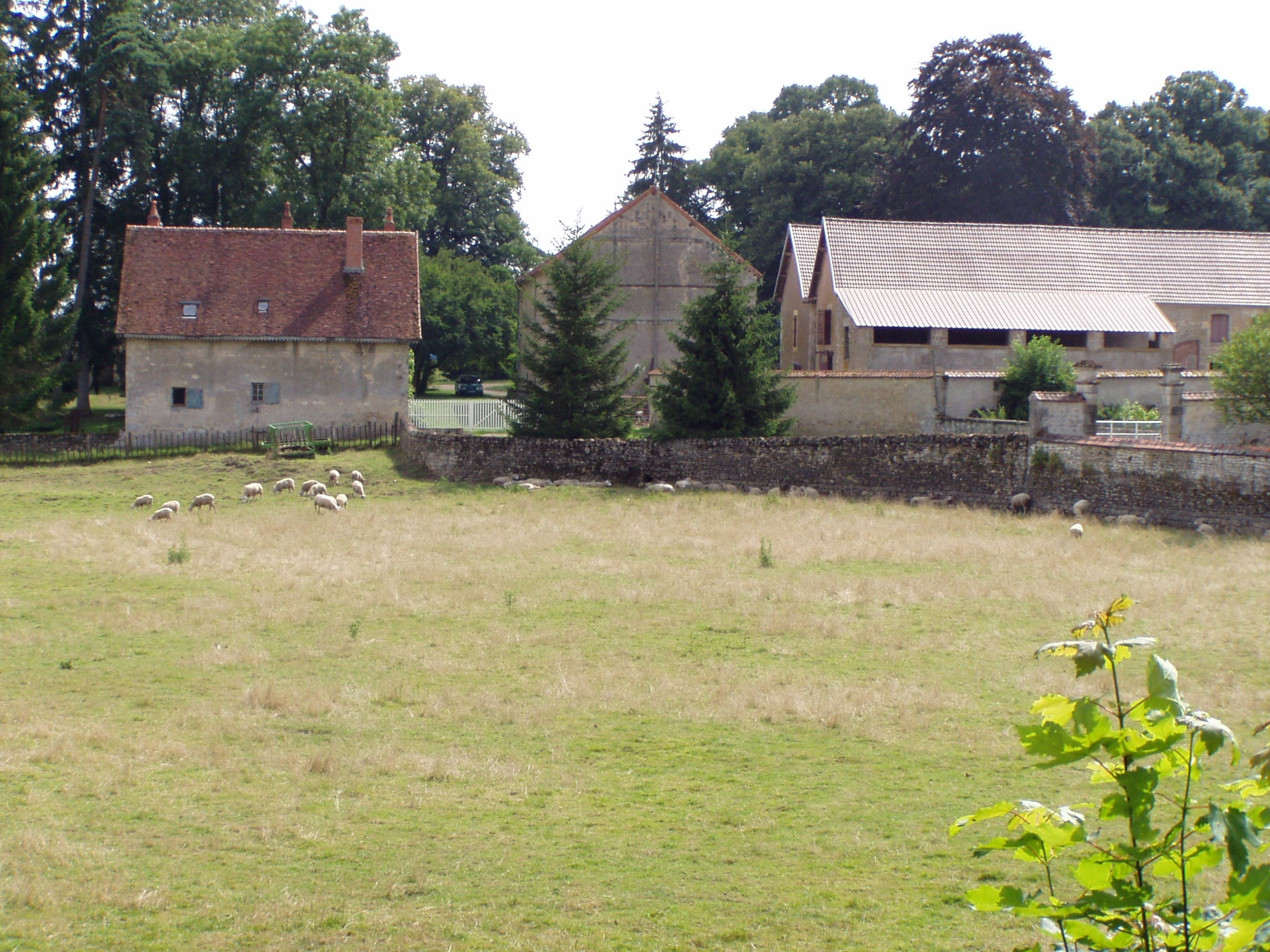
Site of the former abbey

Bourras Abbey (French: Abbaye de Bourras; Latin: Bonus radius) is a former Cistercian monastery in the commune of Saint-Malo-en-Donziois in Nièvre, Burgundy, France. It was situated about 26 km to the north-east of La Charité-sur-Loire on a tributary of the River Nièvre.

== History ==
The abbey was founded in 1119 by Hugues of Thil, lord of Champlemy, and his wife Alix of Montenoison as the first daughter house of Pontigny Abbey. It became the burial place of several of the lords of Montenoison. It established one daughter house of its own, Chalivoy Abbey.

At the end of the Middle Ages the monastery was held in commendam. During the French Wars of Religion the abbey was burnt down in 1568 by the troops of Wolfgang, Count Palatine of Zweibrücken.

The abbey, by that time housing only three monks, was suppressed during the French Revolution in 1791.

== Buildings ==
The house of the commendatory abbot survives, and has been converted into a large country house, and the former monastic estate is still farmed. Near the house three arcades of the cloister have been set up. Bases and capitals of the pillars from the church nave have also been discovered. The choir screen of the abbey church is now in the parish church of Varzy.
