= Mousseau =

Mousseau is a French surname. Notable people with the surname include:

- Alexis Mousseau (1767–1848), farmer and political figure in Lower Canada
- France Mousseau or Jean-Marc Généreux (born 1962), French Canadian ballroom dance champion, choreographer and TV personality
- Jean-Paul Mousseau (1927–1991), Quebec artist, student of Paul-Émile Borduas, member of the Automatist school
- Joseph Octave Mousseau (1844–1898), physician and political figure in Quebec
- Joseph-Alfred Mousseau, PC (1837–1886), French Canadian politician
- Joseph-Octave Mousseau (1875–1965), lawyer and political figure in Quebec
- Michael Mousseau (born 1964), American political scientist

== See also ==
- Lac Mousseau or Harrington Lake estate, the official country retreat of the Prime Minister of Canada
- Moussa
- Mousse
- Moussey (disambiguation)
- Moussy (disambiguation)
- Moussé
