= Mousa (name) =

Mousa is a masculine given name and surname of Arabic origin. It is a Gallicized spelling of the Arabic name Mūsā (Arabic: موسی, "Moses"). Notable people with the name include:

== Given name ==
- Mousa Abu-Jazar (born 1987), Palestinian footballer
- Mousa Al Allaq (born 1986), Qatari footballer
- Mousa Al-Awadi (born 1985), Jordanian basketball player
- Mousa Al-Barakah (born 1989), Qatari footballer
- Mousa Chegini, Iranian diplomat and politician
- Mousa Dembélé (Belgian footballer) (born 1987), Belgian footballer
- Mousa Esmaeilpour (born 1981), Iranian bodybuilder and coach
- Mousa Farawi (born 1998), Palestinian footballer
- Mousa Ghaninejad (born 1951), Iranian economist
- Mousa Hadid (born 1965), Palestinian civil engineer and politician
- Mousa Hatab (born 1981), Emirati footballer
- Mousa Kalantari (1949–1981), Iranian politician
- Mousa Khiabani (1947–1982), Iranian politician
- Mousa Kraish (born 1975), American actor and director
- Mousa Madkhali (born 1987), Saudi footballer
- Mousa Abu Marzook (born 1951), Palestinian politician
- Mousa Nabipour (born 1983), Iranian basketball player
- Mousa Namjoo (1938–1981), Iranian military figure and politician
- Mousa Qorbani, Iranian Shia cleric
- Mousa Refan (born 1958), Iranian electrical engineer and military officer
- Mousa Al-Shammeri (born 1986), Saudi footballer
- Mousa Balla Sowe (born 1997), Gambian footballer
- Mousa Al-Tarjami (born 1991), Saudi footballer
- Mousa El Tayeb (born 1984), Sudanese footballer
- Mousa Naghi Zadeh (born 1979), Iranian Muay Thai practitioner
- Mousa Shubairi Zanjani (1928–2026), Iranian Twelver Shia Marja
- Mousa Shanan Zayed (born 1994), Qatari tennis player

== Surname ==
- Abdo Mousa (1927–1977), Jordanian musical artist
- Abdullah Mousa (born 1987), Emirati footballer
- Adwar Mousa (born 1950), Syrian singer-songwriter and poet
- Ahmad Chikh Mousa (born 2000), German kickboxer
- Alaa Mousa (born 1985), Syrian war criminal
- Bader Mousa (born 1999), Palestinian footballer
- Gader Mousa (born 1982), Qatari footballer
- Guma Mousa (born 1978), Libyan footballer
- Habib Mousa (born 1952), Syrian singer
- Hamad Mousa (born 2006), Qatari basketball player
- Hamid Majid Mousa (born 1941), Iraqi politician
- Mohamed Mousa (born 1977), Egyptian weightlifter
- Muslim Mousa (born 2005), Iraqi footballer
- Qadoura Mousa (1952–2012), Palestinian governor
- Sadiq Mousa (born 1959), Iraqi footballer
- Suleiman Mousa (1919–2008), Jordanian historian

== See also ==
- Mousa (disambiguation)
- Moussa
- Musa (disambiguation)
