= La Celle-sur-Nièvre =

- Commune
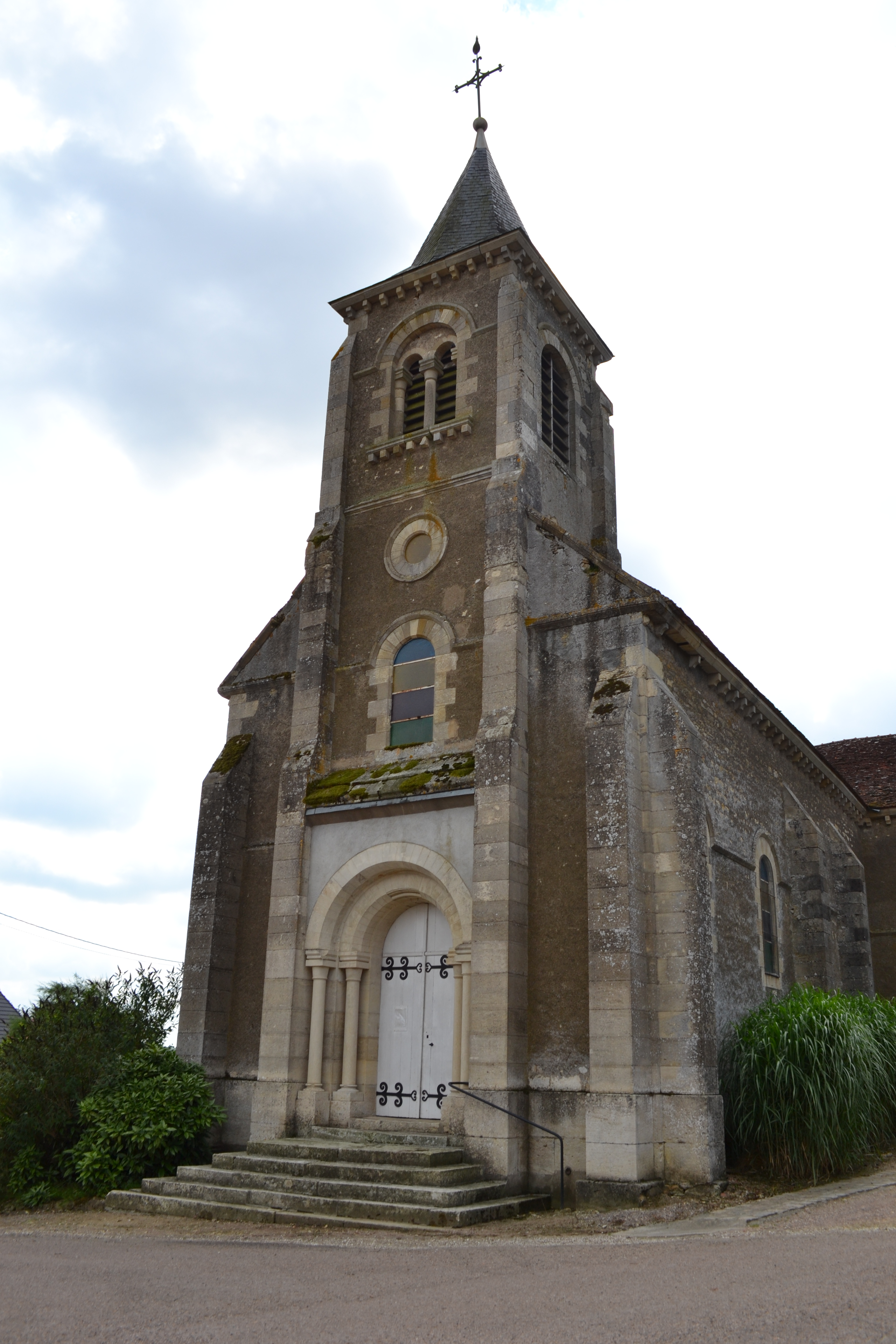
- The church in La Celle-sur-Nièvre
- Location of La Celle-sur-Nièvre
- Location within France Location within Bourgogne-Franche-Comté
- Coordinates: 47°12′23″N 3°13′12″E
- Country: France
- Region: Bourgogne-Franche-Comté
- Department: Nièvre
- Arrondissement: Cosne-Cours-sur-Loire
- Canton: La Charité-sur-Loire
- Intercommunality: Les Bertranges

Government
  - Mayor (2020–2026): Ginette Saulnier
- Area^{1}: 12.95 km^{2} (5.00 sq mi)
- Highest elevation: 337 m (1,106 ft)
- Lowest elevation: 203 m (666 ft)
- Population (2023): 152
  - Density: 11.7/km^{2} (30.4/sq mi)
- Time zone: UTC+01:00 (CET)
  - Summer (DST): UTC+02:00 (CEST)
- INSEE/Postal code: 58045 /58700
- ^{1} French Land Register data, which excludes lakes, ponds, glaciers > 1 km^{2} (0.386 sq mi or 247 acres) and river estuaries.

La Celle-sur-Nièvre (French pronunciation: [la sɛl syʁ njɛvʁ], literally La Celle on Nièvre) is a commune in the Nièvre department in central France.

== Geography ==
The commune is made up of five villages, La Celle-sur-Nièvre, Mauvrain, Gagy, Saint-Lay and Le Bas de La Celle. It is surrounded by French Oak forests and is in the Coteaux Charitois wine region. The next nearest and larger town is La Charité-sur-Loire, 20 km (12 mi), and Nevers, the capital town of the department, is about 40 km (25 mi) away.

== Administration ==
The Mayor is Mme Ginette Saulnier who has been in office since 2008 and will hold office until 2026; she was preceded by M. Camille Melaye

As in most communes there is a local school based in the same building as the Mairie (Townhall).

== Demography ==
Historical population
Year	Pop.	±% p.a.
1968	242	—
1975	212	−1.87%
1982	212	+0.00%
1990	173	−2.51%
1999	168	−0.33%
2007	167	−0.07%
2012	164	−0.36%
2017	160	−0.49%
2023	152	−0.85%
Source: INSEE

== Other ==
There are two local wine growers both with tasting at Mauvrain. It also achieves note for the local Charolais cattle.

The nearest shop is in the bar at Beaumont-la-Ferrière, a small town about 3 km (1.9 mi) distance where English is spoken. Vans visit the outlying villages to sell their produce.

La Celle has a Church St Martin's but it is only open for special events or in rotation for services. The church is otherwise available in Beaumont.

== See also ==
- Communes of the Nièvre department
