= Arrondissement of Cosne-Cours-sur-Loire =

Coordinates: 47°24′44″N 2°55′39″E

Cosne-Cours-sur-Loire
- Arrondissement
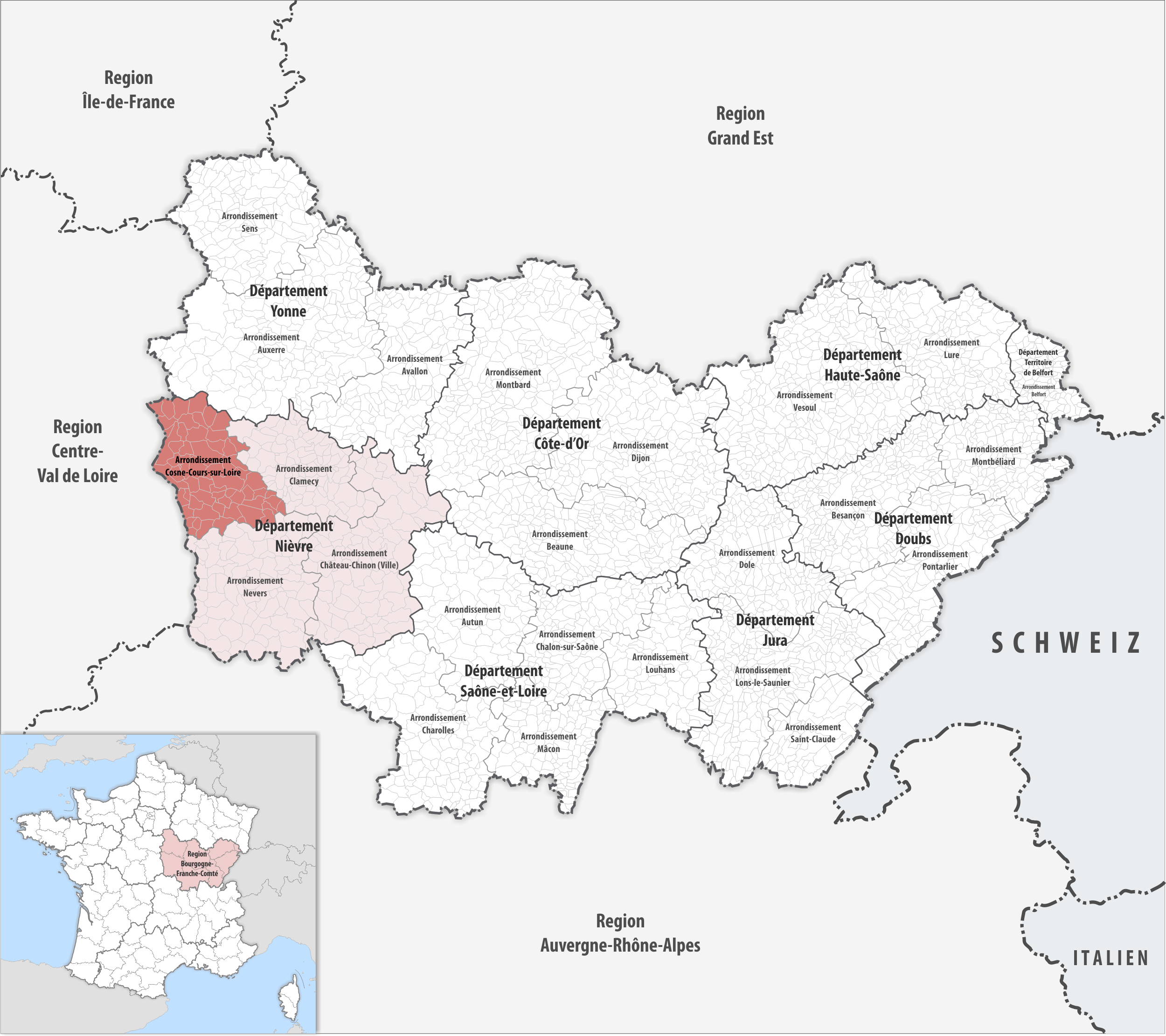
- Location within the region Bourgogne-Franche-Comté
- Country: France
- Region: Bourgogne-Franche-Comté
- Department: Nièvre
- No. of communes: {{{nbcomm}}}
- Area: 1,395.4 km^{2} (538.8 sq mi)
- Population (2023): 42,333
  - Density: 30.338/km^{2} (78.574/sq mi)
- INSEE code: 584

The arrondissement of Cosne-Cours-sur-Loire is an arrondissement of France in the Nièvre department in the Bourgogne-Franche-Comté region. It has 63 communes. Its population is 42,206 (2021), and its area is 1,395.4 km^{2} (538.8 sq mi).

== Composition ==
The communes of the arrondissement of Cosne-Cours-sur-Loire, and their INSEE codes, are:

1. Alligny-Cosne (58002)
2. Annay (58007)
3. Arbourse (58009)
4. Arquian (58012)
5. Arthel (58013)
6. Arzembouy (58014)
7. Beaumont-la-Ferrière (58027)
8. Bitry (58033)
9. Bouhy (58036)
10. Bulcy (58042)
11. La Celle-sur-Loire (58044)
12. La Celle-sur-Nièvre (58045)
13. Cessy-les-Bois (58048)
14. Champlemy (58053)
15. Champvoux (58056)
16. La Charité-sur-Loire (58059)
17. Chasnay (58061)
18. Châteauneuf-Val-de-Bargis (58064)
19. Chaulgnes (58067)
20. Ciez (58077)
21. Colméry (58081)
22. Cosne-Cours-sur-Loire (58086)
23. Couloutre (58089)
24. Dampierre-sous-Bouhy (58094)
25. Dompierre-sur-Nièvre (58101)
26. Donzy (58102)
27. Garchy (58122)
28. Giry (58127)
29. Lurcy-le-Bourg (58147)
30. La Marche (58155)
31. Menestreau (58162)
32. Mesves-sur-Loire (58164)
33. Montenoison (58174)
34. Moussy (58184)
35. Murlin (58186)
36. Myennes (58187)
37. Nannay (58188)
38. Narcy (58189)
39. Neuvy-sur-Loire (58193)
40. Oulon (58203)
41. Perroy (58209)
42. Pougny (58213)
43. Pouilly-sur-Loire (58215)
44. Prémery (58218)
45. Raveau (58220)
46. Saint-Amand-en-Puisaye (58227)
47. Saint-Andelain (58228)
48. Saint-Aubin-les-Forges (58231)
49. Saint-Bonnot (58234)
50. Sainte-Colombe-des-Bois (58236)
51. Saint-Laurent-l'Abbaye (58248)
52. Saint-Loup-des-Bois (58251)
53. Saint-Malo-en-Donziois (58252)
54. Saint-Martin-sur-Nohain (58256)
55. Saint-Père (58261)
56. Saint-Quentin-sur-Nohain (58265)
57. Saint-Vérain (58270)
58. Sichamps (58279)
59. Suilly-la-Tour (58281)
60. Tracy-sur-Loire (58295)
61. Tronsanges (58298)
62. Varennes-lès-Narcy (58302)
63. Vielmanay (58307)

== History ==
The arrondissement of Cosne was created in 1800, disbanded in 1926 and restored in 1943. At the January 2017 reorganisation of the arrondissements of Nièvre, it lost one commune to the arrondissement of Clamecy.

As a result of the reorganisation of the cantons of France which came into effect in 2015, the borders of the cantons are no longer related to the borders of the arrondissements. The cantons of the arrondissement of Cosne-Cours-sur-Loire were, as of January 2015:

1. La Charité-sur-Loire
2. Cosne-Cours-sur-Loire-Nord
3. Cosne-Cours-sur-Loire-Sud
4. Donzy
5. Pouilly-sur-Loire
6. Prémery
7. Saint-Amand-en-Puisaye

== Sub-prefects ==
- Joseph Masclet (19 May 1811 – 30 July 1814)
