= Varennes-lès-Narcy =

- Commune
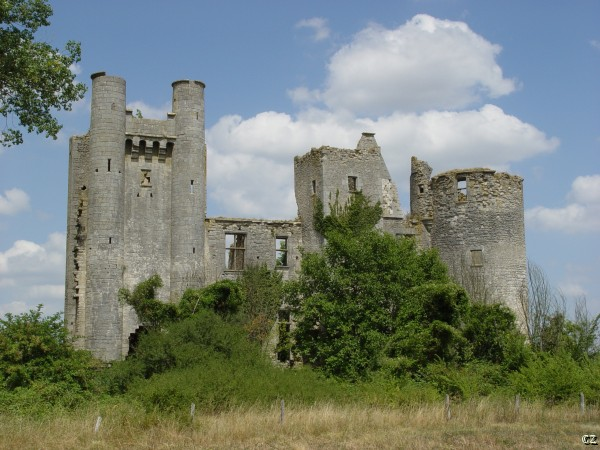
- The ruins of Passy-les-Tours Castle
- Location of Varennes-lès-Narcy
- Location within France Location within Bourgogne-Franche-Comté
- Coordinates: 47°12′57″N 3°04′25″E
- Country: France
- Region: Bourgogne-Franche-Comté
- Department: Nièvre
- Arrondissement: Cosne-Cours-sur-Loire
- Canton: La Charité-sur-Loire
- Intercommunality: Les Bertranges

Government
  - Mayor (2020–2026): Alain Bauget
- Area^{1}: 18.33 km^{2} (7.08 sq mi)
- Highest elevation: 205 m (673 ft)
- Lowest elevation: 160 m (520 ft)
- Population (2023): 901
  - Density: 49.2/km^{2} (127/sq mi)
- Time zone: UTC+01:00 (CET)
  - Summer (DST): UTC+02:00 (CEST)
- INSEE/Postal code: 58302 /58400
- ^{1} French Land Register data, which excludes lakes, ponds, glaciers > 1 km^{2} (0.386 sq mi or 247 acres) and river estuaries.

Varennes-lès-Narcy (French pronunciation: [vaʁɛn lɛ naʁsi], literally Varennes near Narcy) is a commune in the Nièvre department and Bourgogne-Franche-Comté region of east-central France.

== Population ==
Historical population
Year	Pop.	±% p.a.
1968	751	—
1975	675	−1.51%
1982	723	+0.99%
1990	742	+0.32%
1999	754	+0.18%
2007	794	+0.65%
2012	938	+3.39%
2017	955	+0.36%
2023	901	−0.97%
Source: INSEE

== See also ==
- Communes of the Nièvre department
