= Narcy =

Narcy may refer to the following places in France:

- Narcy, Haute-Marne, a commune in the Haute-Marne department
- Narcy, Nièvre, a commune in the Nièvre department
- Narcy (rapper), stage name of Iraqi-Canadian rapper and journalist Yassin Alsalman (born 1982)
- Jean-Claude Narcy (born 1938), French journalist and news anchor
- Narcy Novack (born 1956), convicted of the murders of Bernice and Ben Novack Jr., her mother-in-law and estranged husband, respectively
