= Adèle de Kercado =

French painter (1784–1867)

- Born: Joséphine-Eulalie-Adèle Le Sénéchal de Kercado; 14 January 1784; Vannes, France
- Died: 24 January 1867 (aged 83); Paris, France
- Resting place: Cimetière de Montparnasse
- Parents: Marie-Jean-Prudent Le Sénéchal de Kercado (father); Marguerite-Geneviève-Pauline Raynal (mother)

Joséphine-Eulalie-Adèle Le Sénéchal de Kercado, known professionally as Adèle de Kercado (14 January 1784 – 24 January 1867), was a prolific French copyist active in the mid-19th century. Born into a prominent Breton family of colonial planters, she maintained artistic activity from at least the late 1830s to around 1860, producing large-scale copies of religious paintings for churches and provincial institutions.

== Family and early life ==
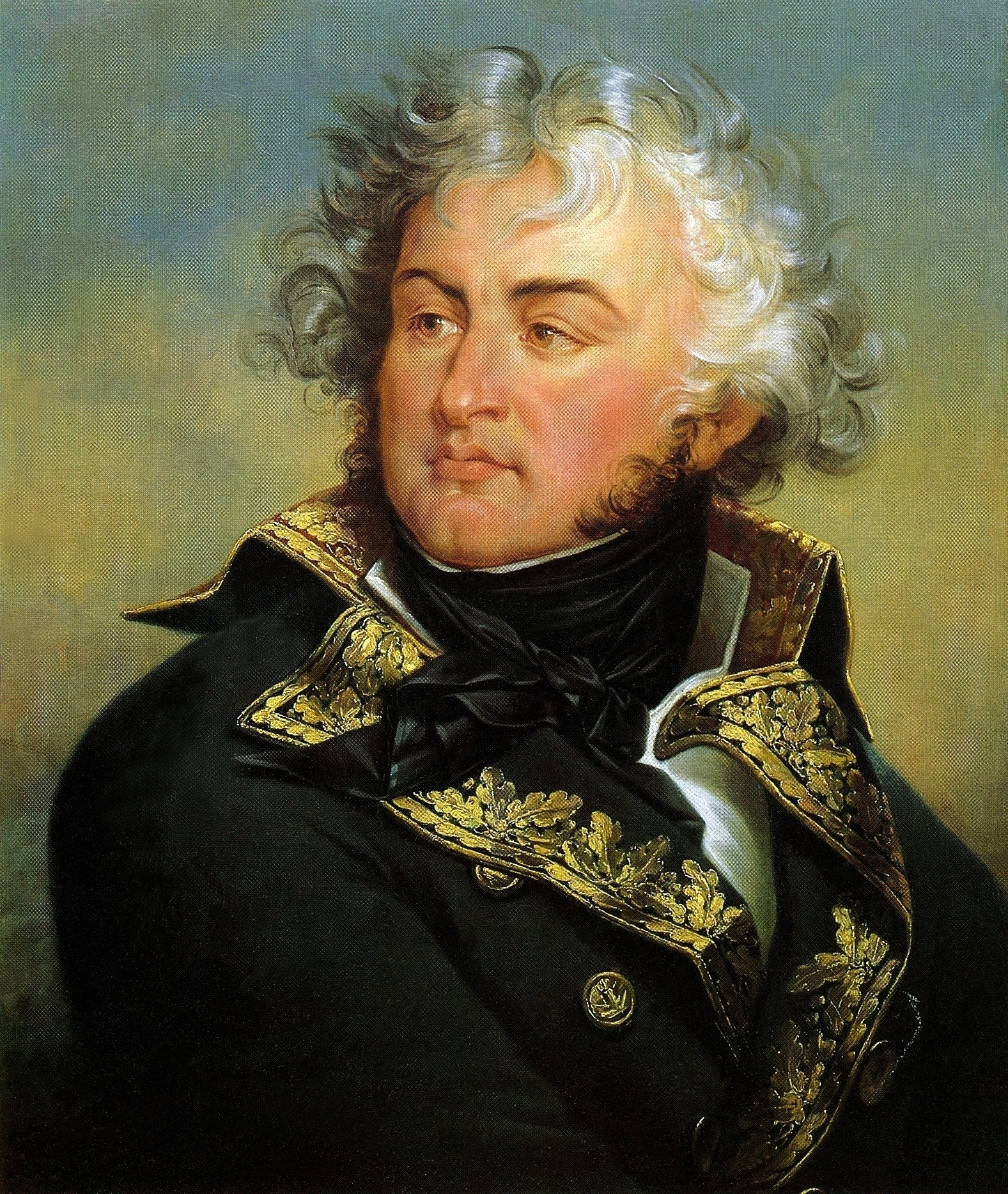
Jean-Baptiste Kléber by Adèle de Kercado

Joséphine-Eulalie-Adèle Le Sénéchal de Kercado was born on 14 January 1784 in Vannes into an affluent and well-connected family. She was the daughter of Marie-Jean-Prudent Le Sénéchal de Kercado, a Breton nobleman and wealthy planter, and Marguerite-Geneviève-Pauline Raynal of Nantes. The Le Sénéchal de Kercado and Raynal families were closely linked through marriage and property, maintaining networks of influence across France and the French colonies.

De Kercado's father owned several plantations in Saint-Domingue, present-day Haiti, including the Habitation Kercado in the Plaine du Cul-de-Sac, as well as urban property and coffee estates in Port-au-Prince. These holdings were largely destroyed in 1793 during the Haitian Revolution, significantly diminishing the family's fortune. Documents from the period show the household actively managing and selling properties, including enslaved people.

At the time of her father's death, the family, including Adèle, were living at 11 rue d'Anjou-Saint-Honoré in Paris. After the Franco-Haitian indemnity agreement of 1825, de Kercado filed claims under the French system of compensation for former colonial property owners, seeking restitution for her father's and extended family's lost estates.

== Career ==
From at least 1837–1859, de Kercado was active as an artist, primarily producing large-scale copies of religious works for churches and town halls outside of Paris.

De Kercado worked primarily as a copyist of Old Master religious paintings, producing large-scale oils for churches, courts, and municipal buildings throughout France. She was most active from the late 1830s through to the 1850s, a time when the French state regularly commissioned artists to reproduce works from the Louvre and other royal collections for provincial institutions. As with many women working as copyists at this time, her works were disseminated broadly, while her name has remained largely absent from later art-historical narratives.

Around 1838, de Kercado was commissioned by the French state to copy a religious painting from the Louvre for the town hall of Prémery. Another state commission followed in 1839, when she painted a copy of Murillo's Penitent Magdalene, then in the Louvre's Spanish Gallery of Louis-Philippe. The painting was purchased directly from the artist and deposited in the town hall of Sauveterre-de-Béarn. In 1908 it was classified as a historic monument. In about 1844, Louis Philippe, King of France, made a gift of de Kercado's copy of Murillo's Madonna of the Assumption to the Catholic church of Norfolk, Virginia in the United States.

De Kercado made several reproductions of Philippe de Champaigne's Christ on the Cross, one destined for the church of Notre-Dame d'Auteuil in Paris, and another for the Court of Appeal in Orléans, completed in 1843. De Kercado was also responsible for several versions of a Pietà with Saint Francis and Mary Magdalene, after Carracci. One version was commissioned in 1847 for the church of Marsac-sur-l'Isle in the Dordogne for 800 francs, while others were sent to churches in Navarrenx, Brécey, and Gimel-les-Cascades.

An Annunciation after Vasari, signed by the artist, was painted for the Convent of the Visitation in Moulins, and was displayed alongside other devotional paintings. A further Annunciation, after Guido Reni, which was described by a contemporary travel guide as "full of freshness and grace", was installed in the church of Guémené and was also a gift of the French government.

Besides earning income from her work as a copyist, she is documented in the archives of the Musées nationaux in the Secours et encouragements aux artistes series, which records financial assistance to working artists. On 1 February 1837, she received a grant of 500 francs.

== Later life and death ==
In later life, she lived in the Batignolles-Monceau neighbourhood of Paris. De Kercado died at her home on the rue du Havre on 24 January 1867, at the age of 83. She is buried in the Cimetière de Montparnasse.
