= Al-Barakah =

Al-Barakah is an Arabic surname. Notable people with the surname include:

- Abdulrahman Al-Barakah (born 1990), Saudi Arabian football player
- Khaled Al-Barakah (born 1990), Saudi Arabian football player
- Mousa Al-Barakah (born 1989), Qatari football player

== See also ==
- Barakah
