= Giry =

Giry may refer to:

== People ==
- Arthur Giry (1848–1899), French historian
- Louis Giry (1596–1665), French lawyer, translator and writer
- Odet-Joseph Giry (1699–1761), French clergyman
- Sylvie Giry-Rousset (born 1965), French cross-country skier

== Places ==
- Giry, Nièvre, France

== Fictional characters ==
- Madame Giry, from The Phantom of the Opera
- Meg Giry, from The Phantom of the Opera
