= Moussa (name) =

Moussa is both a given name and a surname. It is a Gallicized spelling of the Arabic name Mūsā (Arabic: موسی, "Moses"). Notable people with the name include:

== Given name ==
- Moussa Ag Amastan (1867–1920), Amenokal of the Kel Ahaggar Tuareg
- Moussa Arafat (died 2005), cousin of late Palestinian leader Yasser Arafat
- Moussa Ayoub (1873–1955), Syrian-born British portrait artist
- Moussa Benhamadi (1953–2020), Algerian politician
- Moussa Camara (athlete) (born 1988), Malian track and field athlete
- Moussa Camara (goalkeeper) (born 1998), Guinean footballer
- Moussa Coulibaly (footballer, born 1981) (born 1981), Malian footballer
- Moussa Dembélé (French footballer) (born 1996), French footballer
- Moussa Dembélé (hurdler) (born 1988), Senegalese hurdler
- Moussa Diabaté (born 2002), French basketball player
- Moussa Diaby (born 1999), French footballer
- Moussa Faki (born 1960), Prime Minister of Chad
- Moussa Helal (born 1949), former professional squash player
- Moussa Hojeij (born 1974), Lebanese football player
- Moussa Ibrahim (born 1974), Libyan spokesman for Muammar Gaddafi's regime
- Moussa Kermanian (1922–1980), Iranian Jewish community leader, businessman and journalist
- Moussa Konaté (writer) (1951–2013), Malian writer
- Moussa Koussa (born 1949), former Libyan Minister of Foreign Affairs under Gaddafi
- Moussa Kouyate (born 1956), Malian kora player
- Moussa Latoundji (born 1978), Beninese footballer
- Moussa N'Diaye (disambiguation)
- Moussa Narry (born 1986), Nigerian football midfielder
- Moussa Ouattara (disambiguation), several people
- Moussa Pokong (born 1987), Cameroonian footballer
- Moussa Saïb (born 1969), Algerian footballer
- Moussa Sanogo (born 1985), footballer
- Moussa Sissoko (born 1989), French footballer
- Moussa Sow (born 1986), Senegalese footballer
- Moussa Sy (born 1979), Guinean football striker
- Moussa Sylla (disambiguation), several people
- Moussa Timbiné (born 1974), Malian politician
- Moussa Tine (born 1953), Senegalese painter
- Moussa Traoré (1936–2020), Malian soldier and politician
- Moussa Wagué (born 1998), Senegalese footballer
- Moussa Yahaya (born 1975), Nigerian footballer

== Middle name ==
- Balla Moussa Keïta (1934–2001), Malian actor and comedian

== Surname ==
- Abdul Halim Moussa (1930–2003), Egyptian police officer and interior minister
- Amr Moussa (born 1936), Egyptian politician and diplomat
- Franck Moussa (born 1989), Belgian footballer
- Hassan Moussa, imam of the Stockholm Mosque
- Hassen Moussa (born 1973), Tunisian judoka
- Idriss Ndele Moussa (1959–2013), Chadian dentist politician
- Mathéo Moussa (born 2005), Gabonese footballer
- Mustapha Moussa (1962–2024), Algerian boxer
- Raouf Salama Moussa (1929–2006), notable Egyptian bacteriologist and editor
- Salama Moussa (1887–1958), Egyptian journalist and reformer
- Sameera Moussa (1917–1952), Egyptian nuclear scientist
- Samy Moussa (born 1984), Canadian conductor and composer
- Tarek El Moussa (born 1981), American businessman and television personality
- Zara Moussa (born 1980), Nigerien singer and rapper

== See also ==
- Mousa (name)
- Musa (disambiguation)
- Musa, the Israelite prophet known to Christians and Jews as Moses
