= Dompierre-sur-Nièvre =

- Commune
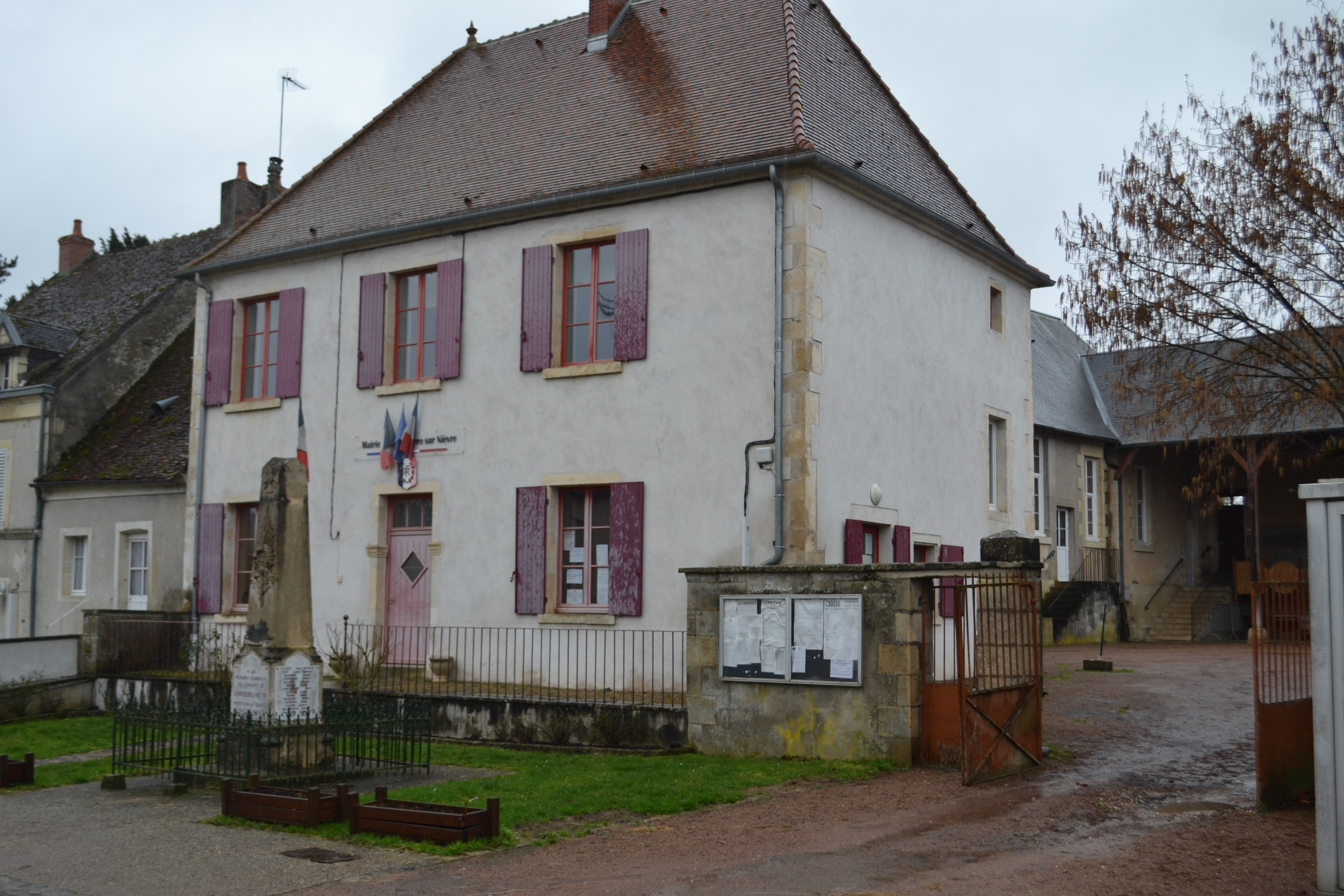
- Dompierre-sur-Nièvre's town hall
- Location of Dompierre-sur-Nièvre
- Location within France Location within Bourgogne-Franche-Comté
- Coordinates: 47°14′21″N 3°15′08″E
- Country: France
- Region: Bourgogne-Franche-Comté
- Department: Nièvre
- Arrondissement: Cosne-Cours-sur-Loire
- Canton: La Charité-sur-Loire

Government
  - Mayor (2020–2026): Sylvie Thomas
- Area^{1}: 18.60 km^{2} (7.18 sq mi)
- Highest elevation: 333 m (1,093 ft)
- Lowest elevation: 222 m (728 ft)
- Population (2023): 180
  - Density: 9.7/km^{2} (25/sq mi)
- Time zone: UTC+01:00 (CET)
  - Summer (DST): UTC+02:00 (CEST)
- INSEE/Postal code: 58101 /58350
- ^{1} French Land Register data, which excludes lakes, ponds, glaciers > 1 km^{2} (0.386 sq mi or 247 acres) and river estuaries.

Dompierre-sur-Nièvre (French pronunciation: [dɔ̃pjɛʁ syʁ njɛvʁ], literally Dompierre on Nièvre) is a commune in the Nièvre department, region of Bourgogne-Franche-Comté, France.

== See also ==
- Communes of the Nièvre department
