= Murlin =

- Commune
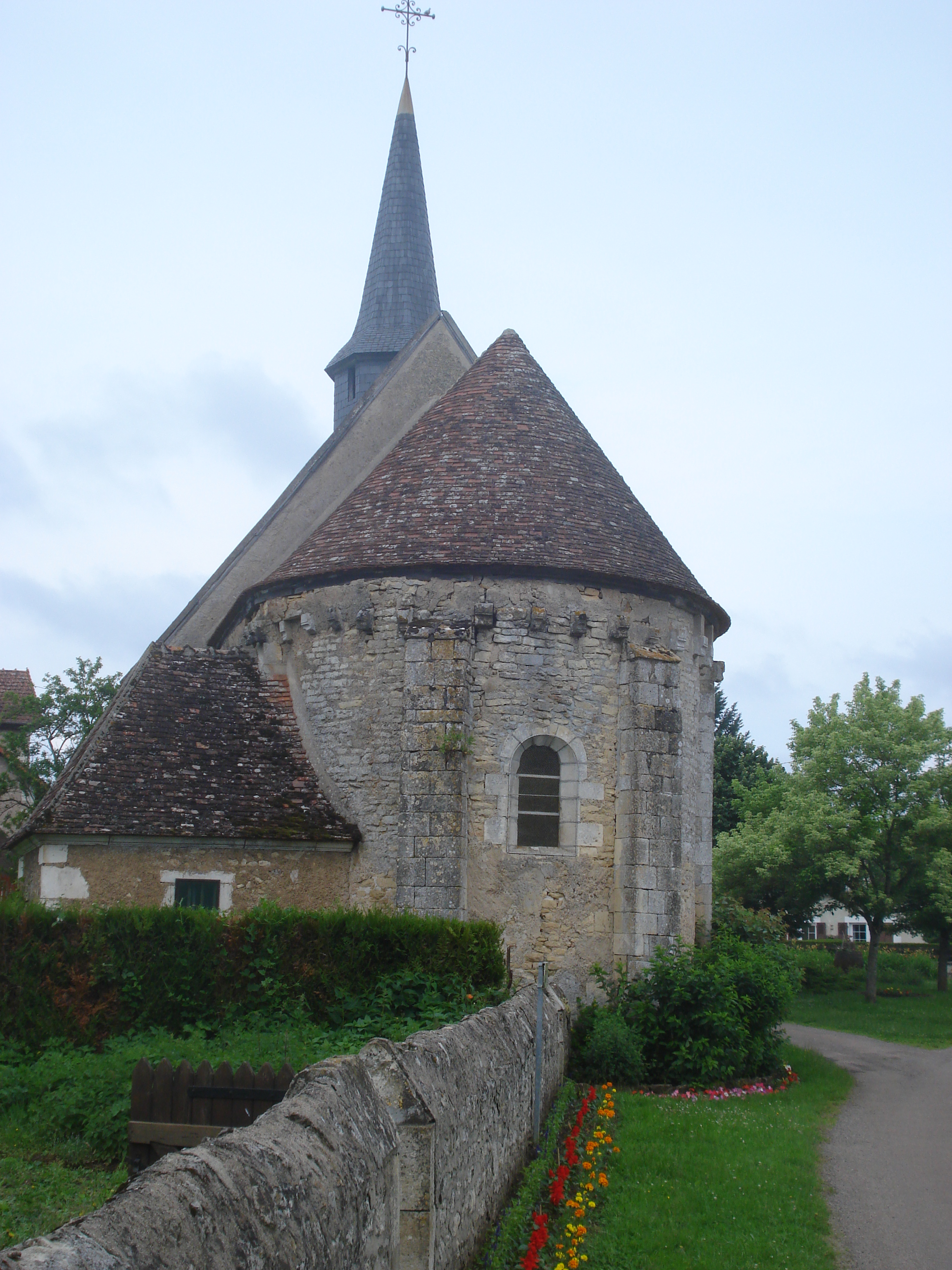
- The church in Murlin
- Location of Murlin
- Location within France Location within Bourgogne-Franche-Comté
- Coordinates: 47°12′16″N 3°10′53″E
- Country: France
- Region: Bourgogne-Franche-Comté
- Department: Nièvre
- Arrondissement: Cosne-Cours-sur-Loire
- Canton: La Charité-sur-Loire
- Intercommunality: Les Bertranges

Government
  - Mayor (2020–2026): Serge Routtier
- Area^{1}: 15.09 km^{2} (5.83 sq mi)
- Highest elevation: 307 m (1,007 ft)
- Lowest elevation: 211 m (692 ft)
- Population (2023): 57
  - Density: 3.8/km^{2} (9.8/sq mi)
- Time zone: UTC+01:00 (CET)
  - Summer (DST): UTC+02:00 (CEST)
- INSEE/Postal code: 58186 /58700
- ^{1} French Land Register data, which excludes lakes, ponds, glaciers > 1 km^{2} (0.386 sq mi or 247 acres) and river estuaries.

Murlin (French pronunciation: [myʁlɛ̃]) is a commune in the Nièvre department in central France.

== See also ==
- Communes of the Nièvre department
