= Sichamps =

- Commune
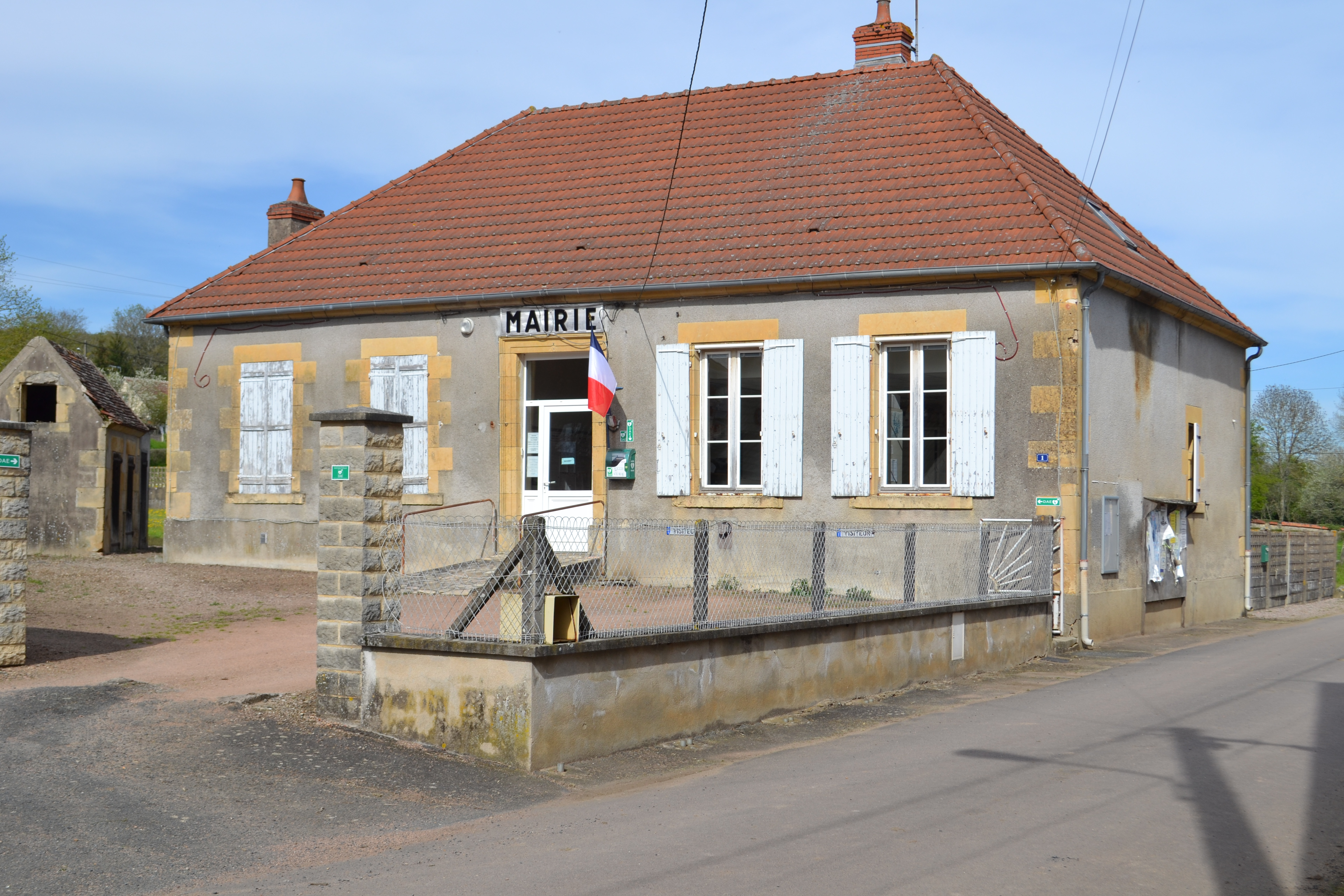
- Town hall
- Location of Sichamps
- Location within France Location within Bourgogne-Franche-Comté
- Coordinates: 47°09′23″N 3°16′40″E
- Country: France
- Region: Bourgogne-Franche-Comté
- Department: Nièvre
- Arrondissement: Cosne-Cours-sur-Loire
- Canton: La Charité-sur-Loire

Government
  - Mayor (2020–2026): Léonard Jaillot
- Area^{1}: 5.90 km^{2} (2.28 sq mi)
- Highest elevation: 342 m (1,122 ft)
- Lowest elevation: 212 m (696 ft)
- Population (2023): 173
  - Density: 29.3/km^{2} (75.9/sq mi)
- Time zone: UTC+01:00 (CET)
  - Summer (DST): UTC+02:00 (CEST)
- INSEE/Postal code: 58279 /58700
- ^{1} French Land Register data, which excludes lakes, ponds, glaciers > 1 km^{2} (0.386 sq mi or 247 acres) and river estuaries.

Sichamps (French pronunciation: [siʃɑ̃]) is a commune in the Nièvre department in central France.

== See also ==
- Communes of the Nièvre department
