= Mousa =

Mousa may refer to:

- Mousa (film)
- Mousa (name)
- Mousa, Shetland, an island in Scotland
- Mousa Ali, a stratovolcano located on the tri-point of Ethiopia, Eritrea and Djibouti
- 12130 Mousa, a minor planet

== See also ==
- Moussa
