= Saint-Aubin-les-Forges =

- Commune
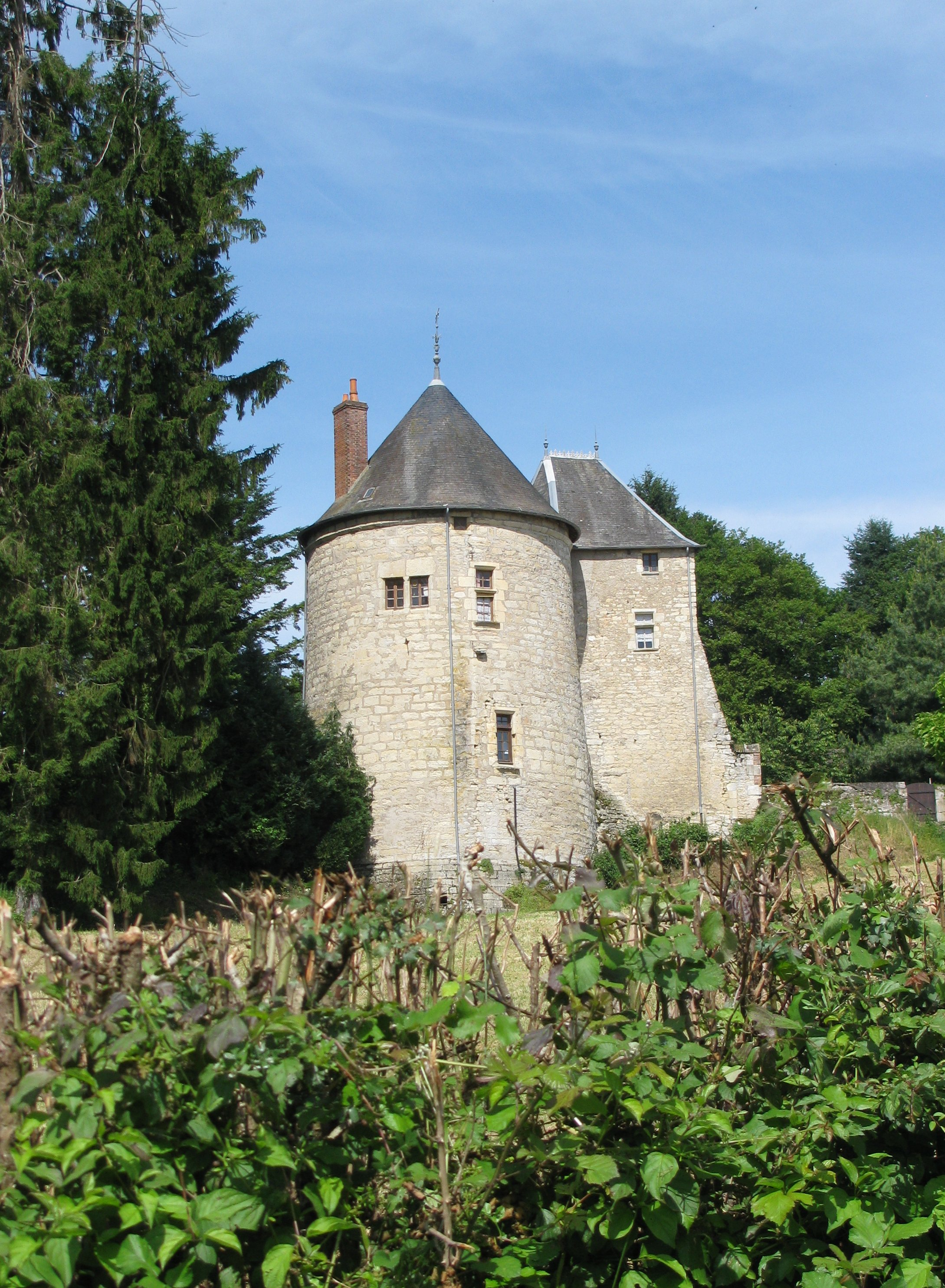
- Frasnay-les-Chanoines, in Saint-Aubin-Les-Forges
- Location of Saint-Aubin-les-Forges
- Location within France Location within Bourgogne-Franche-Comté
- Coordinates: 47°08′29″N 3°12′08″E
- Country: France
- Region: Bourgogne-Franche-Comté
- Department: Nièvre
- Arrondissement: Cosne-Cours-sur-Loire
- Canton: La Charité-sur-Loire

Government
  - Mayor (2020–2026): Bruno Verrain
- Area^{1}: 26.34 km^{2} (10.17 sq mi)
- Highest elevation: 333 m (1,093 ft)
- Lowest elevation: 195 m (640 ft)
- Population (2023): 376
  - Density: 14.3/km^{2} (37.0/sq mi)
- Time zone: UTC+01:00 (CET)
  - Summer (DST): UTC+02:00 (CEST)
- INSEE/Postal code: 58231 /58130
- ^{1} French Land Register data, which excludes lakes, ponds, glaciers > 1 km^{2} (0.386 sq mi or 247 acres) and river estuaries.

Saint-Aubin-les-Forges (French pronunciation: [sɛ̃.t‿obɛ̃ le fɔʁʒ]) is a commune in the Nièvre department in central France.

== See also ==
- Communes of the Nièvre department
