= Oulon =

- Commune
- Location of Oulon
- Location within France Location within Bourgogne-Franche-Comté
- Coordinates: 47°12′00″N 3°23′55″E
- Country: France
- Region: Bourgogne-Franche-Comté
- Department: Nièvre
- Arrondissement: Cosne-Cours-sur-Loire
- Canton: La Charité-sur-Loire

Government
  - Mayor (2020–2026): Lucienne Lapertot
- Area^{1}: 10.99 km^{2} (4.24 sq mi)
- Highest elevation: 364 m (1,194 ft)
- Lowest elevation: 246 m (807 ft)
- Population (2023): 64
  - Density: 5.8/km^{2} (15/sq mi)
- Time zone: UTC+01:00 (CET)
  - Summer (DST): UTC+02:00 (CEST)
- INSEE/Postal code: 58203 /58700
- ^{1} French Land Register data, which excludes lakes, ponds, glaciers > 1 km^{2} (0.386 sq mi or 247 acres) and river estuaries.

Oulon (French pronunciation: [ulɔ̃]) is a commune in the Nièvre department in central France.

== See also ==
- Communes of the Nièvre department
