= Moussy =

Moussy may refer to the following places in France:

- Moussy, Marne, a commune in the Marne department
- Moussy, Nièvre, a commune in the Nièvre department
- Moussy, Val-d'Oise, a commune in the Val-d'Oise department
