= Chasnay =

- Commune
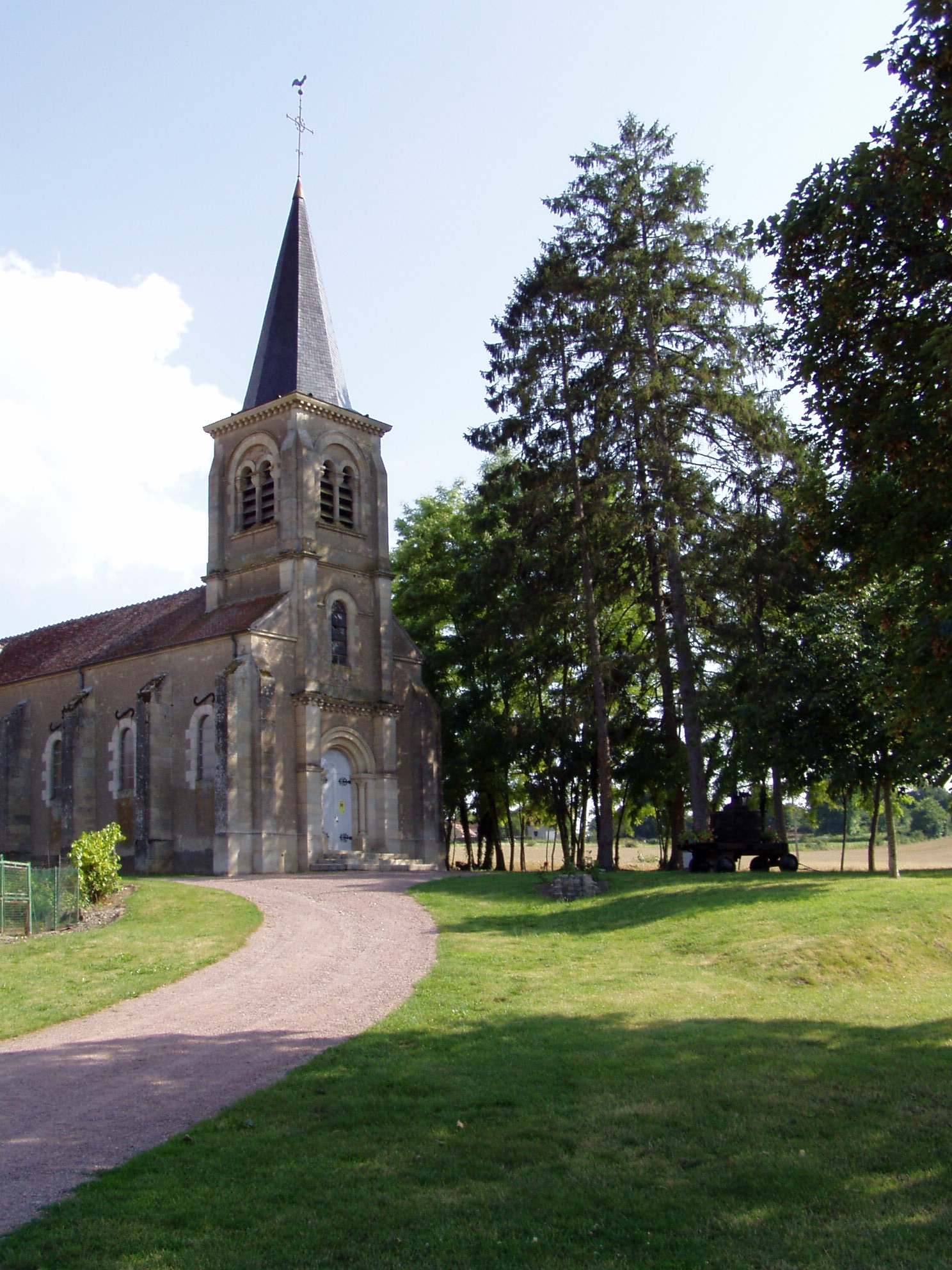
- The church in Chasnay
- Location of Chasnay
- Location within France Location within Bourgogne-Franche-Comté
- Coordinates: 47°14′47″N 3°11′05″E
- Country: France
- Region: Bourgogne-Franche-Comté
- Department: Nièvre
- Arrondissement: Cosne-Cours-sur-Loire
- Canton: La Charité-sur-Loire

Government
  - Mayor (2020–2026): Eric Jacquet
- Area^{1}: 11.76 km^{2} (4.54 sq mi)
- Highest elevation: 350 m (1,150 ft)
- Lowest elevation: 189 m (620 ft)
- Population (2023): 128
  - Density: 10.9/km^{2} (28.2/sq mi)
- Time zone: UTC+01:00 (CET)
  - Summer (DST): UTC+02:00 (CEST)
- INSEE/Postal code: 58061 /58350
- ^{1} French Land Register data, which excludes lakes, ponds, glaciers > 1 km^{2} (0.386 sq mi or 247 acres) and river estuaries.

Chasnay (French pronunciation: [ʃanɛ]) is a commune in the Nièvre department in central France.

== See also ==
- Communes of the Nièvre department
