= Champvoux =

- Commune
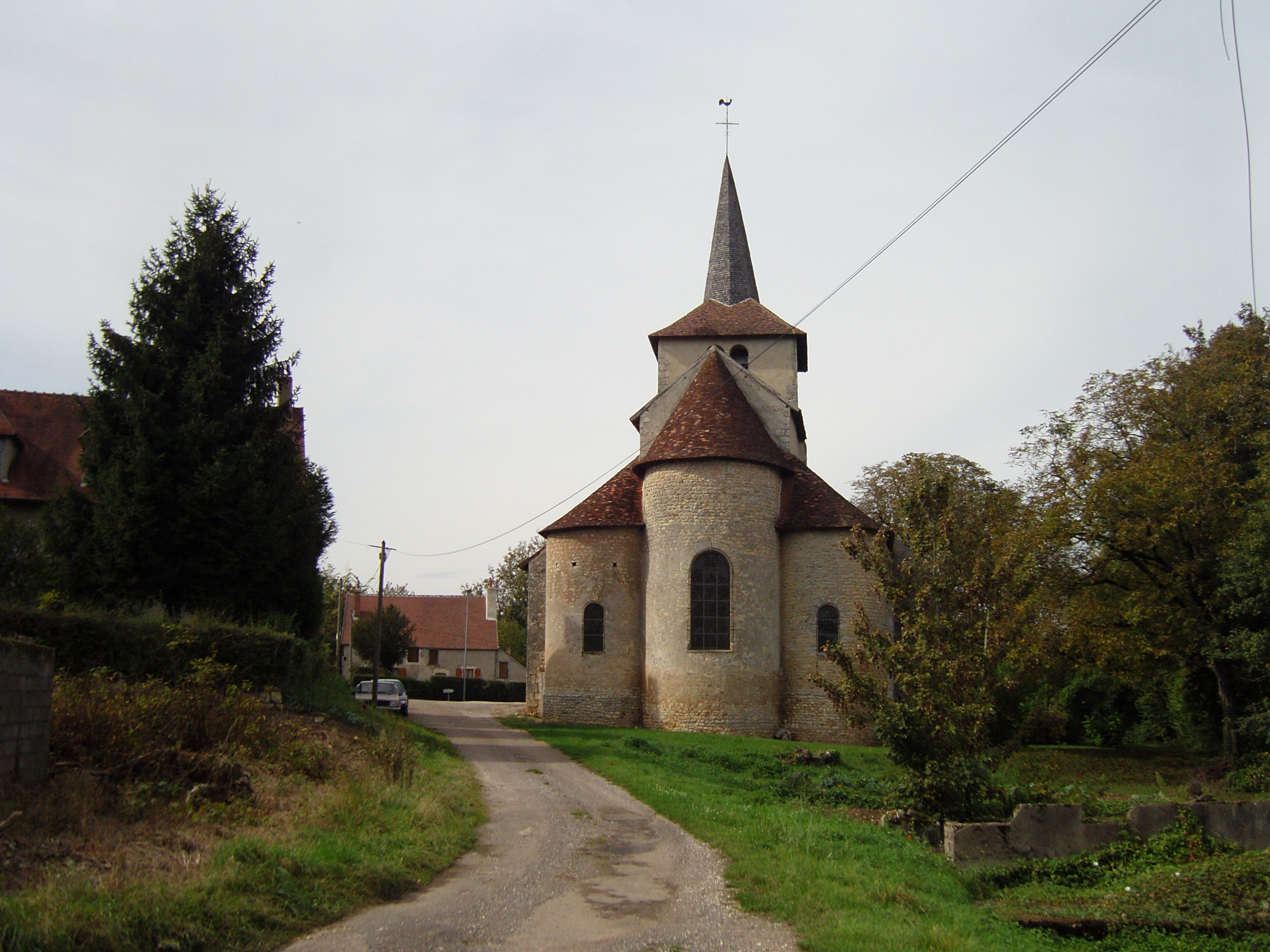
- The church in Champvoux
- Location of Champvoux
- Location within France Location within Bourgogne-Franche-Comté
- Coordinates: 47°09′23″N 3°05′01″E
- Country: France
- Region: Bourgogne-Franche-Comté
- Department: Nièvre
- Arrondissement: Cosne-Cours-sur-Loire
- Canton: La Charité-sur-Loire

Government
  - Mayor (2020–2026): Jean-Louis Rouez
- Area^{1}: 10.67 km^{2} (4.12 sq mi)
- Highest elevation: 254 m (833 ft)
- Lowest elevation: 170 m (560 ft)
- Population (2023): 282
  - Density: 26.4/km^{2} (68.5/sq mi)
- Time zone: UTC+01:00 (CET)
  - Summer (DST): UTC+02:00 (CEST)
- INSEE/Postal code: 58056 /58400
- ^{1} French Land Register data, which excludes lakes, ponds, glaciers > 1 km^{2} (0.386 sq mi or 247 acres) and river estuaries.

Champvoux (French pronunciation: [ʃɑ̃vu]) is a commune in the Nièvre department in central France.

== See also ==
- Communes of the Nièvre department
