= Saint-Bonnot =

- Commune
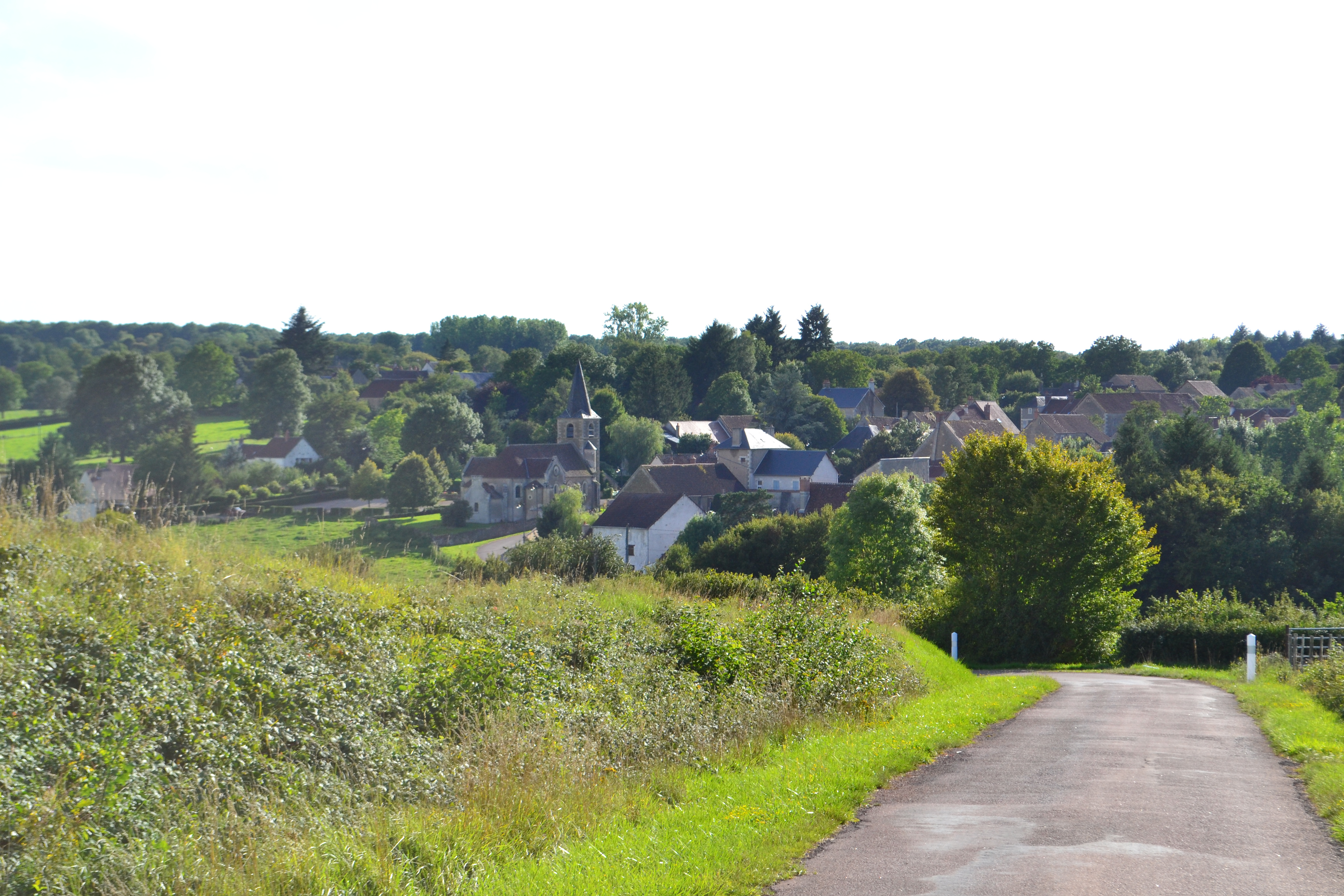
- A general view of Saint-Bonnot
- Location of Saint-Bonnot
- Location within France Location within Bourgogne-Franche-Comté
- Coordinates: 47°14′40″N 3°18′54″E
- Country: France
- Region: Bourgogne-Franche-Comté
- Department: Nièvre
- Arrondissement: Cosne-Cours-sur-Loire
- Canton: La Charité-sur-Loire

Government
  - Mayor (2022–2026): Marie-Hélène Trefouel
- Area^{1}: 16.14 km^{2} (6.23 sq mi)
- Highest elevation: 332 m (1,089 ft)
- Lowest elevation: 247 m (810 ft)
- Population (2023): 155
  - Density: 9.60/km^{2} (24.9/sq mi)
- Time zone: UTC+01:00 (CET)
  - Summer (DST): UTC+02:00 (CEST)
- INSEE/Postal code: 58234 /58700
- ^{1} French Land Register data, which excludes lakes, ponds, glaciers > 1 km^{2} (0.386 sq mi or 247 acres) and river estuaries.

Saint-Bonnot (French pronunciation: [sɛ̃ bɔno]) is a commune in the Nièvre department in central France.

== See also ==
- Communes of the Nièvre department
