= Moussa =

Moussa may refer to:

- Moussa (name)
- Moussa Castle, Lebanon

== See also ==
- Mousa (disambiguation)
