= Chaulgnes =

- Commune
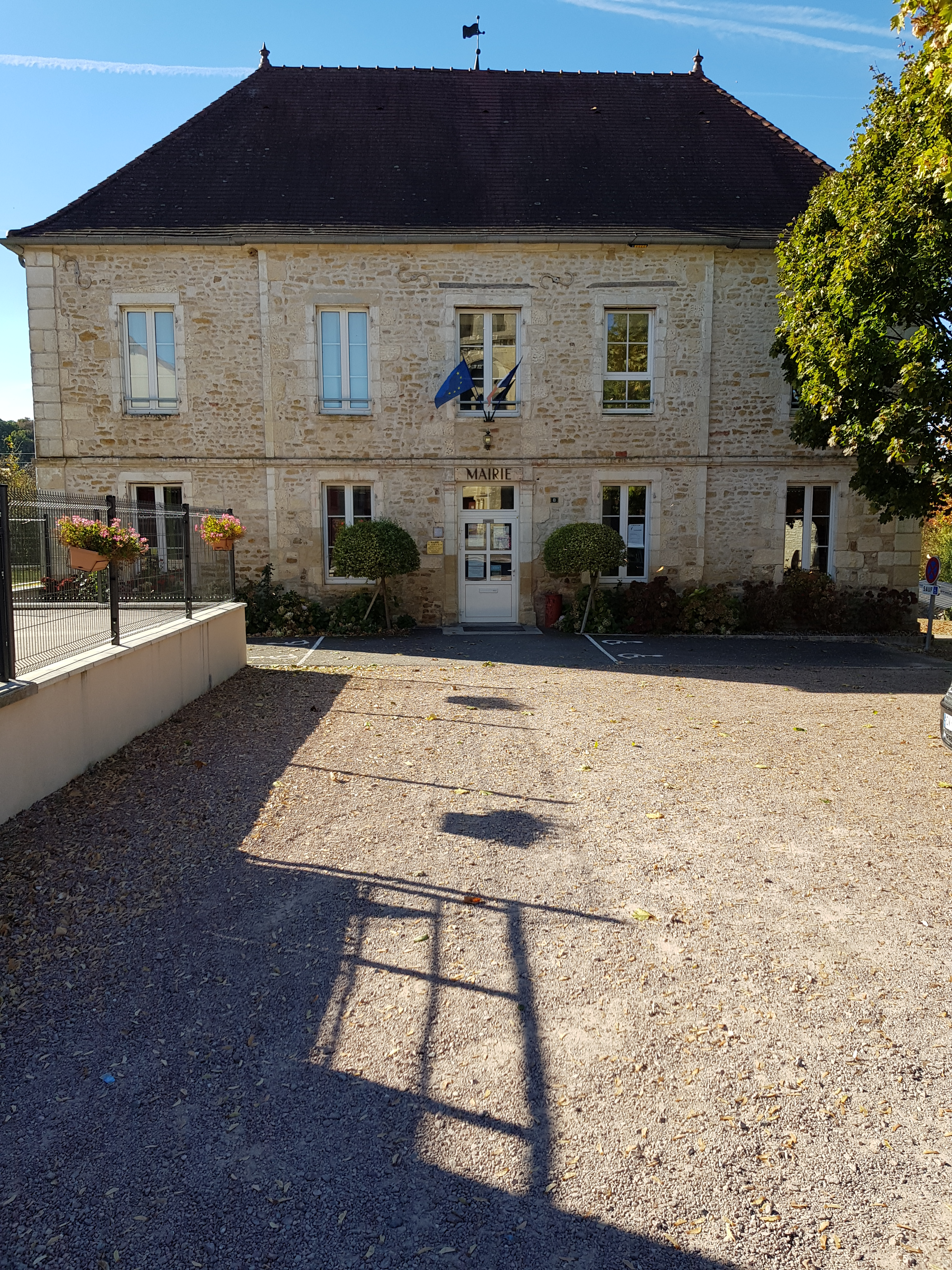
- Chaulgnes Town hall
- Location of Chaulgnes
- Location within France Location within Bourgogne-Franche-Comté
- Coordinates: 47°07′49″N 3°06′15″E
- Country: France
- Region: Bourgogne-Franche-Comté
- Department: Nièvre
- Arrondissement: Cosne-Cours-sur-Loire
- Canton: La Charité-sur-Loire
- Intercommunality: Les Bertranges

Government
  - Mayor (2020–2026): Sébastien Clemencon
- Area^{1}: 25.1 km^{2} (9.7 sq mi)
- Highest elevation: 343 m (1,125 ft)
- Lowest elevation: 177 m (581 ft)
- Population (2023): 1,500
  - Density: 60/km^{2} (150/sq mi)
- Time zone: UTC+01:00 (CET)
  - Summer (DST): UTC+02:00 (CEST)
- INSEE/Postal code: 58067 /58400
- ^{1} French Land Register data, which excludes lakes, ponds, glaciers > 1 km^{2} (0.386 sq mi or 247 acres) and river estuaries.

Chaulgnes (French pronunciation: [ʃolɲ]) is a commune in the Nièvre department and Bourgogne-Franche-Comté region of eastern France.

== Population ==
Historical population
Year	Pop.	±% p.a.
1968	791	—
1975	837	+0.81%
1982	1,188	+5.13%
1990	1,286	+1.00%
1999	1,262	−0.21%
2007	1,326	+0.62%
2012	1,444	+1.72%
2017	1,505	+0.83%
2023	1,500	−0.06%
Source: INSEE

== See also ==
- Communes of the Nièvre department
