= Arthel =

- Commune
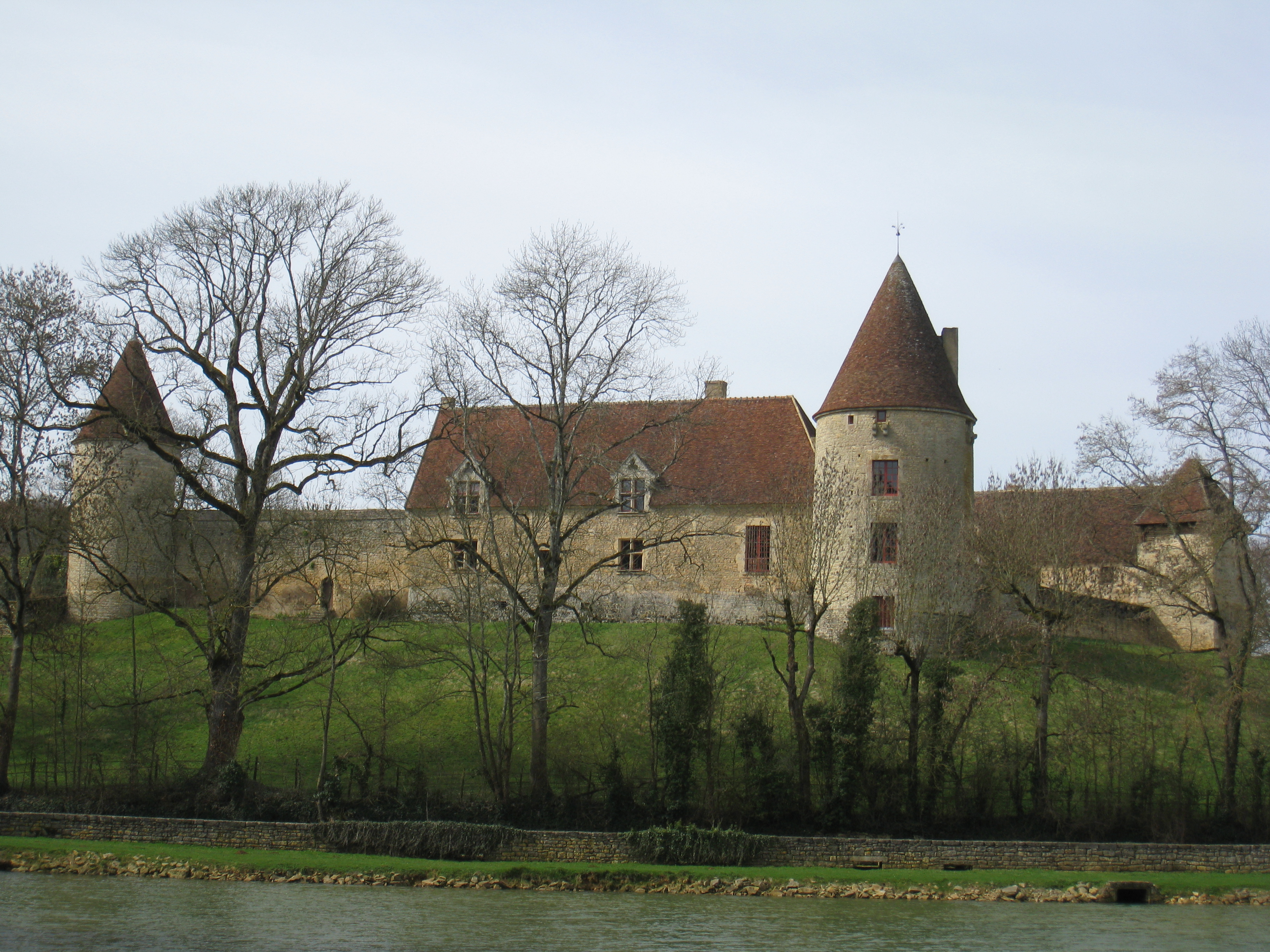
- The Château de la Motte, in Arthel
- Location of Arthel
- Location within France Location within Bourgogne-Franche-Comté
- Coordinates: 47°14′43″N 3°24′35″E
- Country: France
- Region: Bourgogne-Franche-Comté
- Department: Nièvre
- Arrondissement: Cosne-Cours-sur-Loire
- Canton: La Charité-sur-Loire
- Intercommunality: CC Les Bertranges

Government
  - Mayor (2020–2026): Marc Fauche
- Area^{1}: 7.73 km^{2} (2.98 sq mi)
- Highest elevation: 353 m (1,158 ft)
- Lowest elevation: 229 m (751 ft)
- Population (2023): 89
  - Density: 12/km^{2} (30/sq mi)
- Time zone: UTC+01:00 (CET)
  - Summer (DST): UTC+02:00 (CEST)
- INSEE/Postal code: 58013 /58700
- ^{1} French Land Register data, which excludes lakes, ponds, glaciers > 1 km^{2} (0.386 sq mi or 247 acres) and river estuaries.

Arthel (French pronunciation: [aʁtɛl]) is a commune in the Nièvre department in central France.

== Population ==
Historical population
| Year | Pop. | ±% p.a. |
|---|---|---|
| 1968 | 161 | — |
| 1975 | 151 | −0.91% |
| 1982 | 120 | −3.23% |
| 1990 | 97 | −2.62% |
| 1999 | 70 | −3.56% |
| 2007 | 86 | +2.61% |
| 2012 | 97 | +2.44% |
| 2017 | 95 | −0.42% |
| 2023 | 89 | −1.08% |
Source: INSEE

== See also ==
- Communes of the Nièvre department
