= Champlin, Nièvre =

Champlin
- Commune
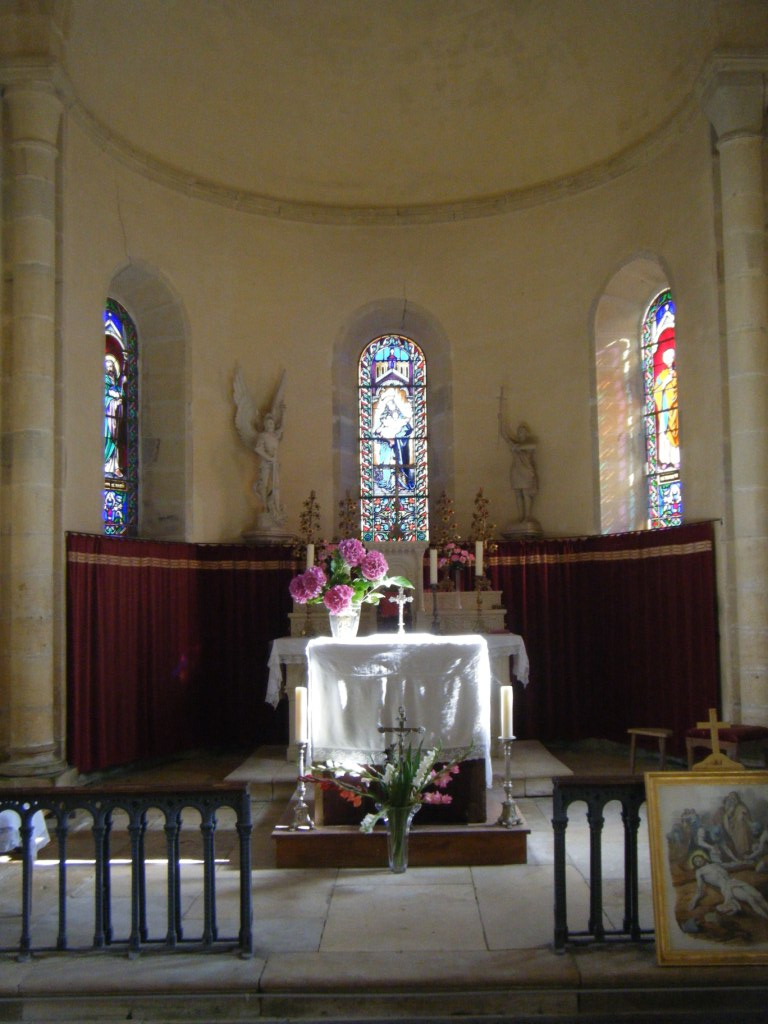
- The interior of the church in Champlin
- Location of Champlin
- Location within France Location within Bourgogne-Franche-Comté
- Coordinates: 47°14′30″N 3°26′48″E
- Country: France
- Region: Bourgogne-Franche-Comté
- Department: Nièvre
- Arrondissement: Clamecy
- Canton: La Charité-sur-Loire

Government
  - Mayor (2020–2026): Jean-Marc Maringe
- Area^{1}: 7.91 km^{2} (3.05 sq mi)
- Highest elevation: 303 m (994 ft)
- Lowest elevation: 223 m (732 ft)
- Population (2023): 45
  - Density: 5.7/km^{2} (15/sq mi)
- Time zone: UTC+01:00 (CET)
  - Summer (DST): UTC+02:00 (CEST)
- INSEE/Postal code: 58054 /58700
- ^{1} French Land Register data, which excludes lakes, ponds, glaciers > 1 km^{2} (0.386 sq mi or 247 acres) and river estuaries.

Champlin (French pronunciation: [ʃɑ̃plɛ̃]) is a commune in the Nièvre department in central France.

== Demographics ==
According to the 1999 census, the population was 48. On 1 January 2019, the estimate was 39.

== See also ==
- Communes of the Nièvre department
