= Arbourse =

- Commune
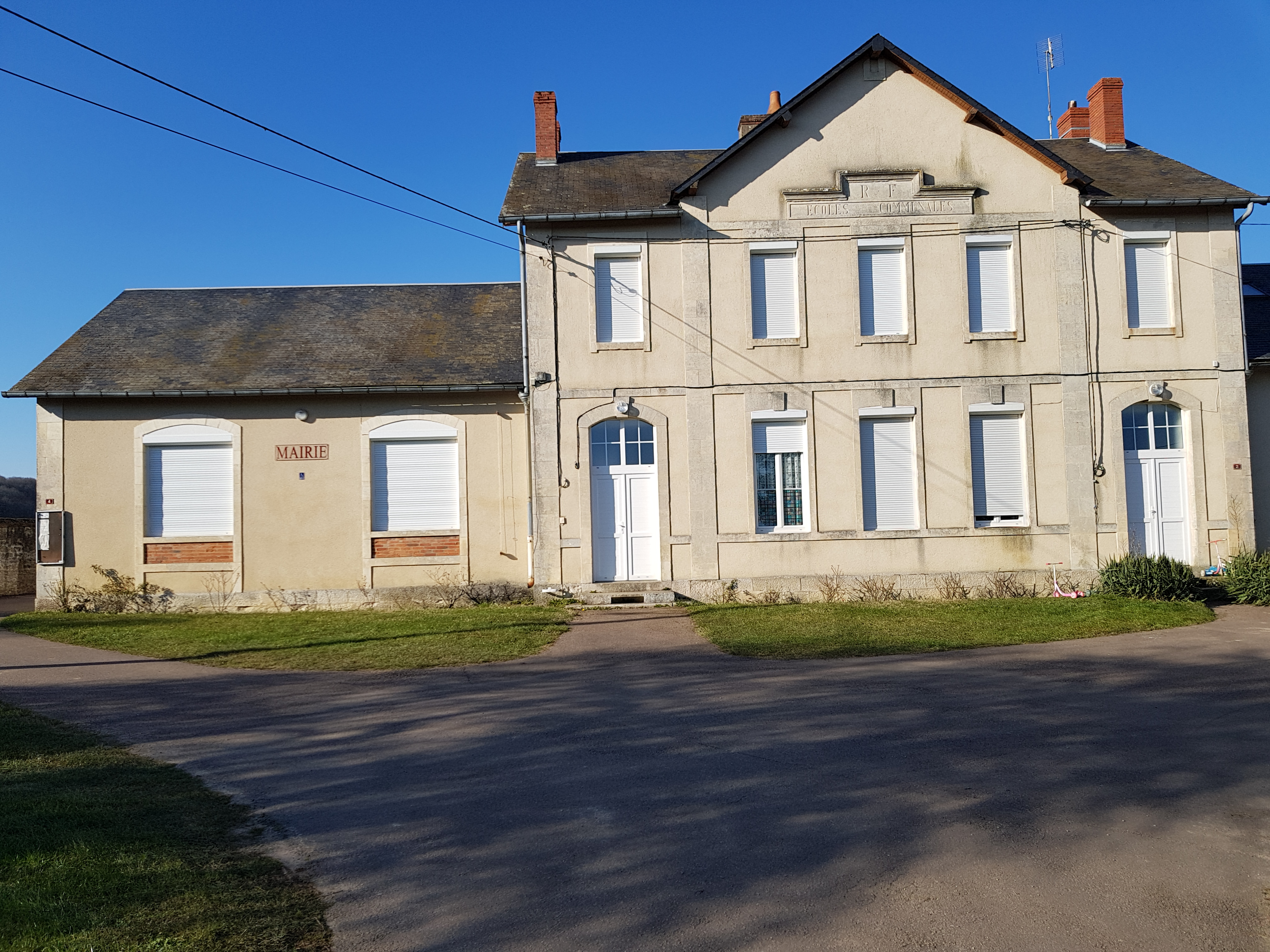
- Town hall
- Location of Arbourse
- Location within France Location within Bourgogne-Franche-Comté
- Coordinates: 47°14′59″N 3°13′40″E
- Country: France
- Region: Bourgogne-Franche-Comté
- Department: Nièvre
- Arrondissement: Cosne-Cours-sur-Loire
- Canton: La Charité-sur-Loire

Government
  - Mayor (2020–2026): Patrick Pruvost
- Area^{1}: 9.20 km^{2} (3.55 sq mi)
- Highest elevation: 367 m (1,204 ft)
- Lowest elevation: 239 m (784 ft)
- Population (2023): 123
  - Density: 13.4/km^{2} (34.6/sq mi)
- Time zone: UTC+01:00 (CET)
  - Summer (DST): UTC+02:00 (CEST)
- INSEE/Postal code: 58009 /58350
- ^{1} French Land Register data, which excludes lakes, ponds, glaciers > 1 km^{2} (0.386 sq mi or 247 acres) and river estuaries.

Arbourse (French pronunciation: [aʁbuʁs]) is a commune in the Nièvre department in central France.

== Population ==
Historical population
Year	Pop.	±% p.a.
1968	209	—
1975	210	+0.07%
1982	164	−3.47%
1990	129	−2.96%
1999	122	−0.62%
2007	108	−1.51%
2012	122	+2.47%
2017	127	+0.81%
2023	123	−0.53%
Source: INSEE

== See also ==
- Communes of the Nièvre department
