= Arzembouy =

- Commune
- Location of Arzembouy
- Location within France Location within Bourgogne-Franche-Comté
- Coordinates: 47°14′45″N 3°22′07″E
- Country: France
- Region: Bourgogne-Franche-Comté
- Department: Nièvre
- Arrondissement: Cosne-Cours-sur-Loire
- Canton: La Charité-sur-Loire
- Intercommunality: CC Les Bertranges

Government
  - Mayor (2020–2026): Raphaël Haghebaert
- Area^{1}: 12.85 km^{2} (4.96 sq mi)
- Highest elevation: 349 m (1,145 ft)
- Lowest elevation: 262 m (860 ft)
- Population (2023): 70
  - Density: 5.4/km^{2} (14/sq mi)
- Time zone: UTC+01:00 (CET)
  - Summer (DST): UTC+02:00 (CEST)
- INSEE/Postal code: 58014 /58700
- ^{1} French Land Register data, which excludes lakes, ponds, glaciers > 1 km^{2} (0.386 sq mi or 247 acres) and river estuaries.

Arzembouy (French pronunciation: [aʁzɑ̃bwi]) is a commune in the Nièvre department in central France.

== Population ==
Historical population
Year	Pop.	±% p.a.
1968	170	—
1975	145	−2.25%
1982	117	−3.02%
1990	85	−3.92%
1999	92	+0.88%
2007	82	−1.43%
2012	71	−2.84%
2017	68	−0.86%
2023	70	+0.48%
Source: INSEE

== See also ==
- Communes of the Nièvre department
