= Nannay =

- Commune
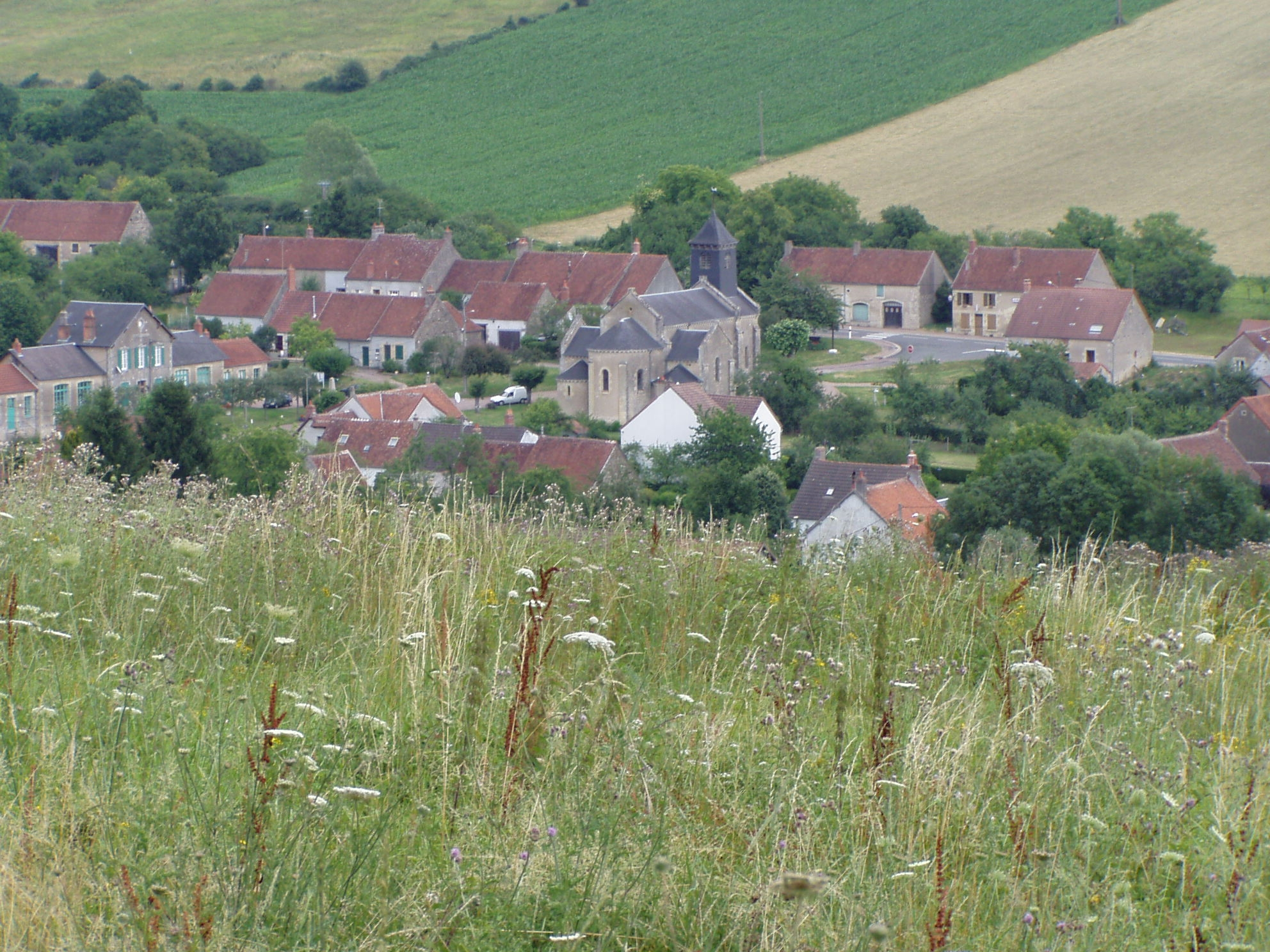
- The church and surrounding buildings in Nannay
- Location of Nannay
- Location within France Location within Bourgogne-Franche-Comté
- Coordinates: 47°15′47″N 3°11′31″E
- Country: France
- Region: Bourgogne-Franche-Comté
- Department: Nièvre
- Arrondissement: Cosne-Cours-sur-Loire
- Canton: La Charité-sur-Loire

Government
  - Mayor (2020–2026): Bernard Seutin
- Area^{1}: 11.44 km^{2} (4.42 sq mi)
- Highest elevation: 353 m (1,158 ft)
- Lowest elevation: 185 m (607 ft)
- Population (2023): 108
  - Density: 9.44/km^{2} (24.5/sq mi)
- Time zone: UTC+01:00 (CET)
  - Summer (DST): UTC+02:00 (CEST)
- INSEE/Postal code: 58188 /58350
- ^{1} French Land Register data, which excludes lakes, ponds, glaciers > 1 km^{2} (0.386 sq mi or 247 acres) and river estuaries.

Nannay (French pronunciation: [nanɛ]) is a commune in the Nièvre department in central France.

== See also ==
- Communes of the Nièvre department
