= Lurcy-le-Bourg =

- Commune
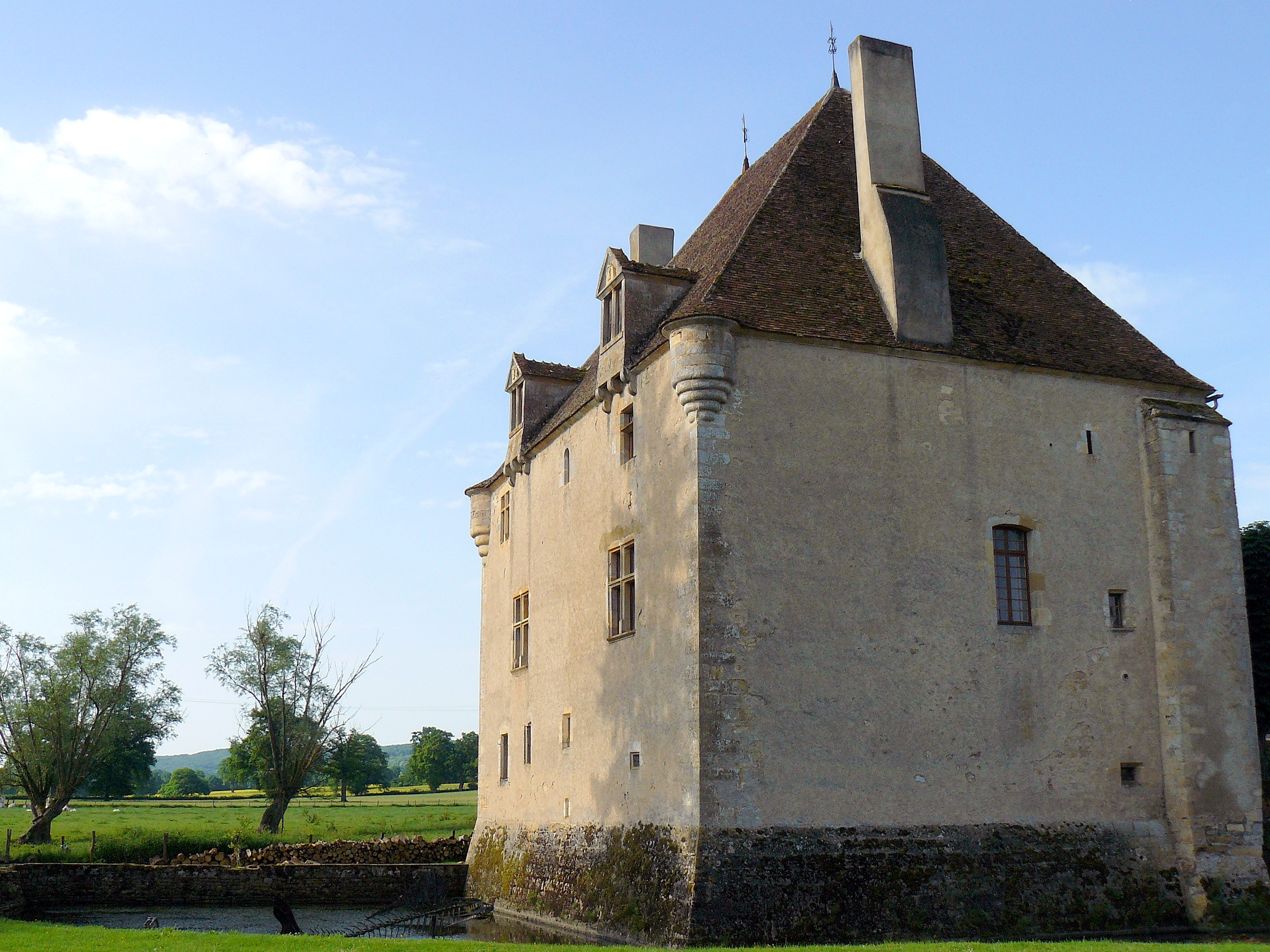
- The Priory (Le Prieuré) in Lurcy-le-Bourg
- Location of Lurcy-le-Bourg
- Location within France Location within Bourgogne-Franche-Comté
- Coordinates: 47°09′42″N 3°23′15″E
- Country: France
- Region: Bourgogne-Franche-Comté
- Department: Nièvre
- Arrondissement: Cosne-Cours-sur-Loire
- Canton: La Charité-sur-Loire

Government
  - Mayor (2020–2026): Michel Asconchilo
- Area^{1}: 22.58 km^{2} (8.72 sq mi)
- Highest elevation: 381 m (1,250 ft)
- Lowest elevation: 239 m (784 ft)
- Population (2023): 275
  - Density: 12.2/km^{2} (31.5/sq mi)
- Time zone: UTC+01:00 (CET)
  - Summer (DST): UTC+02:00 (CEST)
- INSEE/Postal code: 58147 /58700
- ^{1} French Land Register data, which excludes lakes, ponds, glaciers > 1 km^{2} (0.386 sq mi or 247 acres) and river estuaries.

Lurcy-le-Bourg (French pronunciation: [lyʁsi l(ə) buʁ]) is a rural commune in the Nièvre department in central France.

== History ==
On 19 July 1944 amid World War II, five Frenchmen were killed during an encounter between the French Resistance and the German occupying forces in Lurcy-le-Bourg.

== See also ==
- Communes of the Nièvre department
