= Canton of La Charité-sur-Loire =

Administrative division of Nièvre, France

Coordinates: 47.18°N 3.02°E

The canton of La Charité-sur-Loire is an administrative division of the Nièvre department, central France. Its borders were modified at the French canton reorganisation which came into effect in March 2015. Its seat is in La Charité-sur-Loire.

It consists of the following communes:

1. Arbourse
2. Arthel
3. Arzembouy
4. Beaumont-la-Ferrière
5. La Celle-sur-Nièvre
6. Champlemy
7. Champlin
8. Champvoux
9. La Charité-sur-Loire
10. Chasnay
11. Chaulgnes
12. Dompierre-sur-Nièvre
13. Giry
14. Lurcy-le-Bourg
15. La Marche
16. Montenoison
17. Moussy
18. Murlin
19. Nannay
20. Narcy
21. Oulon
22. Prémery
23. Raveau
24. Saint-Aubin-les-Forges
25. Saint-Bonnot
26. Sichamps
27. Tronsanges
28. Varennes-lès-Narcy
