= Joseph Masclet =

Amé Thérèse Joseph Masclet (17 November 1760, Douai – 7 October 1833, Nice) was a French diplomat and an author of letters to Lafayette.

== Biography ==
Former civil servant of Ancien Régime in the French Royal Navy, at Saint-Domingue, he was then a lawyer of the Parlement of Paris in 1788. At the outbreak of the French Revolution, he was involved as a journalist for the Mercure National (Note: Mercure national: a French journal created in 1789.), writing especially for press freedom. He enlisted in the French Revolutionary Army in 1790 as an officer in the 1st Regiment of Riflemen, first as second lieutenant, and later as lieutenant, in 1792; he then served as aide-de-camp to general officers in the Army of the Rhine. Masclet, who was friend to Rouget de Lisle, wrote the last two verses of La Marseillaise.

In an anonymous letter published in the Journal de Paris (1791) under his pseudonym "Eleuthere", he opposed Collot d'Herbois in the case of the Swiss of the Château-Vieux Regiment, that paradoxically became the symbol of freedom, and, in 1792, expressed with André Chénier his strongest claims against festivities given in their honor by the municipality of Paris.

He was pro-Lafayette at that time and went to England during the Reign of Terror to save his life. He constantly wrote defending him, asking for his release from Prussian and Austrian prisons. He published numerous articles in The Morning Chronicle using the pseudonym Eleutheros (freeman). He worked to Lafayette's deliverance and succeeded in establishing a correspondence with Lafayette with the assistance of active agents. They became friends at that time.

Later, he served as sub-prefect during Napoleonic era, respectively in Boulogne-sur-Mer, Lille, Douai and Cosne until 1814. In Boulogne, he was slandered as a double agent, a spy and a traitor.

After the First Restoration, he was French consul at Liverpool from where he went to Edinburgh, and later to Bucharest, in 1824. He was French consul at Nice at the time of his death.

Amé-Thérèse-Joseph Masclet was the eldest son of a large family. One of his brothers, Jean-Baptiste died bishop in Moscow. Another one, Hippolyte. was a court advisor in Russia.

== Quotes ==
- I receive with great pleasure the letter with which you have honored me, and I have perceived with extreme emotion your affecting and energetic address to the people of Great Britain on the subject of M. de Lafayette.
  - Letter from Edward Livingston, Mayor of New York, Senator of Louisiana, Andrew Jackson's Secretary of State, addressed to Joseph Masclet, Bibliorare, New York, November 9, 1796
