= Giry, Nièvre =

Giry
- Commune
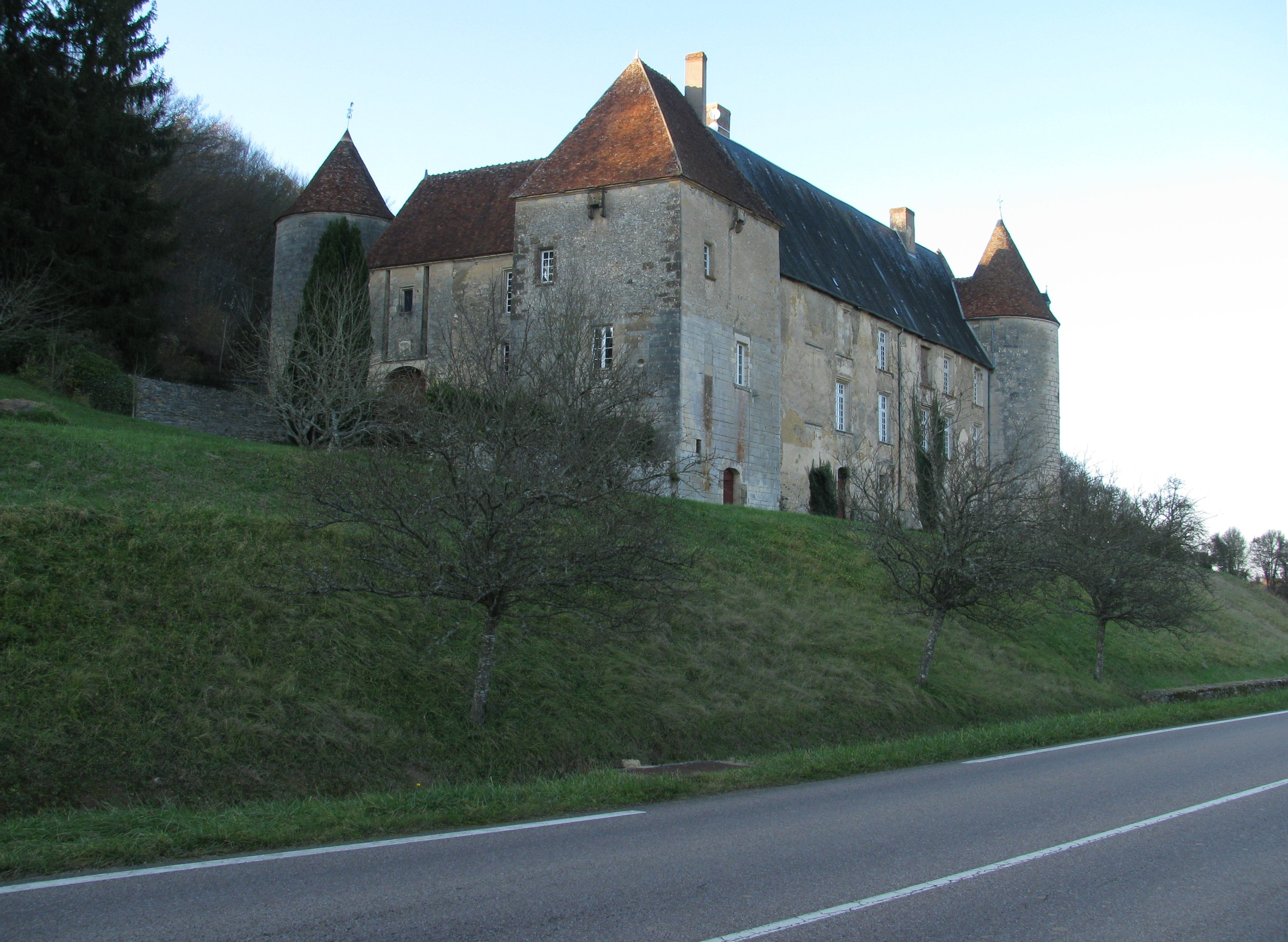
- The chateau in Giry
- Location of Giry
- Location within France Location within Bourgogne-Franche-Comté
- Coordinates: 47°13′18″N 3°21′55″E
- Country: France
- Region: Bourgogne-Franche-Comté
- Department: Nièvre
- Arrondissement: Cosne-Cours-sur-Loire
- Canton: La Charité-sur-Loire

Government
  - Mayor (2022–2026): Jean-François Perrier
- Area^{1}: 23.78 km^{2} (9.18 sq mi)
- Highest elevation: 351 m (1,152 ft)
- Lowest elevation: 238 m (781 ft)
- Population (2023): 187
  - Density: 7.86/km^{2} (20.4/sq mi)
- Time zone: UTC+01:00 (CET)
  - Summer (DST): UTC+02:00 (CEST)
- INSEE/Postal code: 58127 /58700
- ^{1} French Land Register data, which excludes lakes, ponds, glaciers > 1 km^{2} (0.386 sq mi or 247 acres) and river estuaries.

Giry (French pronunciation: [ʒiʁi]) is a commune in the Nièvre department in central France. On 1 January 2022, the population was 188.

== See also ==
- Communes of the Nièvre department
