= Moussa Sylla =

Moussa Sylla may refer to:

- Moussa Sylla (footballer, born 1989), Ivorian footballer
- Moussa Sylla (footballer, born 1999), Malian footballer
- Fodé Moussa Sylla (born 1988), Guinean footballer
