= Moussey =

Moussey may refer to the following places in France:

- Moussey, Aube, a commune in the Aube department
- Moussey, Moselle, a commune in the Moselle department
- Moussey, Vosges, a commune in the Vosges department
