= Moussa Ouattara =

Moussa Ouattara may refer to:

- Moussa Ouattara (basketball) (born 1988), Burkinabé basketball player
- Moussa Ouattara (footballer, born 1981), Burkinabé footballer
- Moussa Ouattara (footballer, born 1988), Ivorian footballer
