= Moussy, Nièvre =

Moussy
- Commune
- Location of Moussy
- Location within France Location within Bourgogne-Franche-Comté
- Coordinates: 47°11′35″N 3°27′16″E
- Country: France
- Region: Bourgogne-Franche-Comté
- Department: Nièvre
- Arrondissement: Cosne-Cours-sur-Loire
- Canton: La Charité-sur-Loire

Government
  - Mayor (2021–2026): Patrick Ansbert-Albert
- Area^{1}: 11.97 km^{2} (4.62 sq mi)
- Highest elevation: 363 m (1,191 ft)
- Lowest elevation: 258 m (846 ft)
- Population (2023): 107
  - Density: 8.94/km^{2} (23.2/sq mi)
- Time zone: UTC+01:00 (CET)
  - Summer (DST): UTC+02:00 (CEST)
- INSEE/Postal code: 58184 /58700
- ^{1} French Land Register data, which excludes lakes, ponds, glaciers > 1 km^{2} (0.386 sq mi or 247 acres) and river estuaries.

Moussy (French pronunciation: [musi]) is a commune in the Nièvre department in central France.

== See also ==
- Communes of the Nièvre department
