= Saint-Malo-en-Donziois =

- Commune
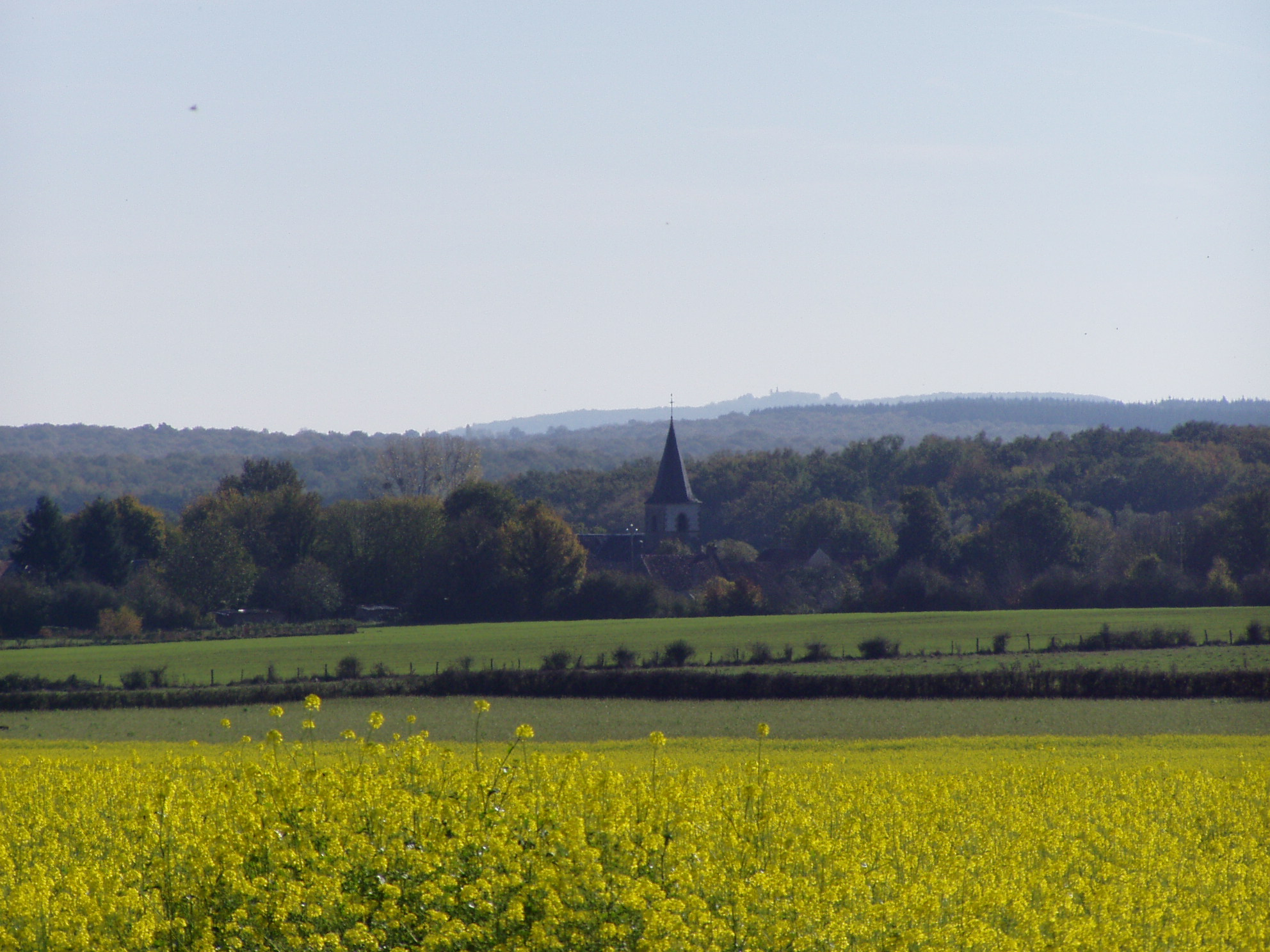
- A general view of Saint-Malo-en-Donziois
- Location of Saint-Malo-en-Donziois
- Location within France Location within Bourgogne-Franche-Comté
- Coordinates: 47°18′50″N 3°16′06″E
- Country: France
- Region: Bourgogne-Franche-Comté
- Department: Nièvre
- Arrondissement: Cosne-Cours-sur-Loire
- Canton: Pouilly-sur-Loire

Government
  - Mayor (2020–2026): Pascal Fassier
- Area^{1}: 14.81 km^{2} (5.72 sq mi)
- Highest elevation: 360 m (1,180 ft)
- Lowest elevation: 248 m (814 ft)
- Population (2023): 150
  - Density: 10/km^{2} (26/sq mi)
- Time zone: UTC+01:00 (CET)
  - Summer (DST): UTC+02:00 (CEST)
- INSEE/Postal code: 58252 /58350
- ^{1} French Land Register data, which excludes lakes, ponds, glaciers > 1 km^{2} (0.386 sq mi or 247 acres) and river estuaries.

Saint-Malo-en-Donziois is a commune in the Nièvre department in central France.

== Demographics ==
Historical population
Year	Pop.	±% p.a.
1968	199	—
1975	154	−3.60%
1982	127	−2.72%
1990	121	−0.60%
1999	115	−0.56%
2007	131	+1.64%
2012	131	+0.00%
2017	128	−0.46%
2023	150	+2.68%
Source: INSEE

== See also ==
- Communes of the Nièvre department
