= Montenoison =

- Commune
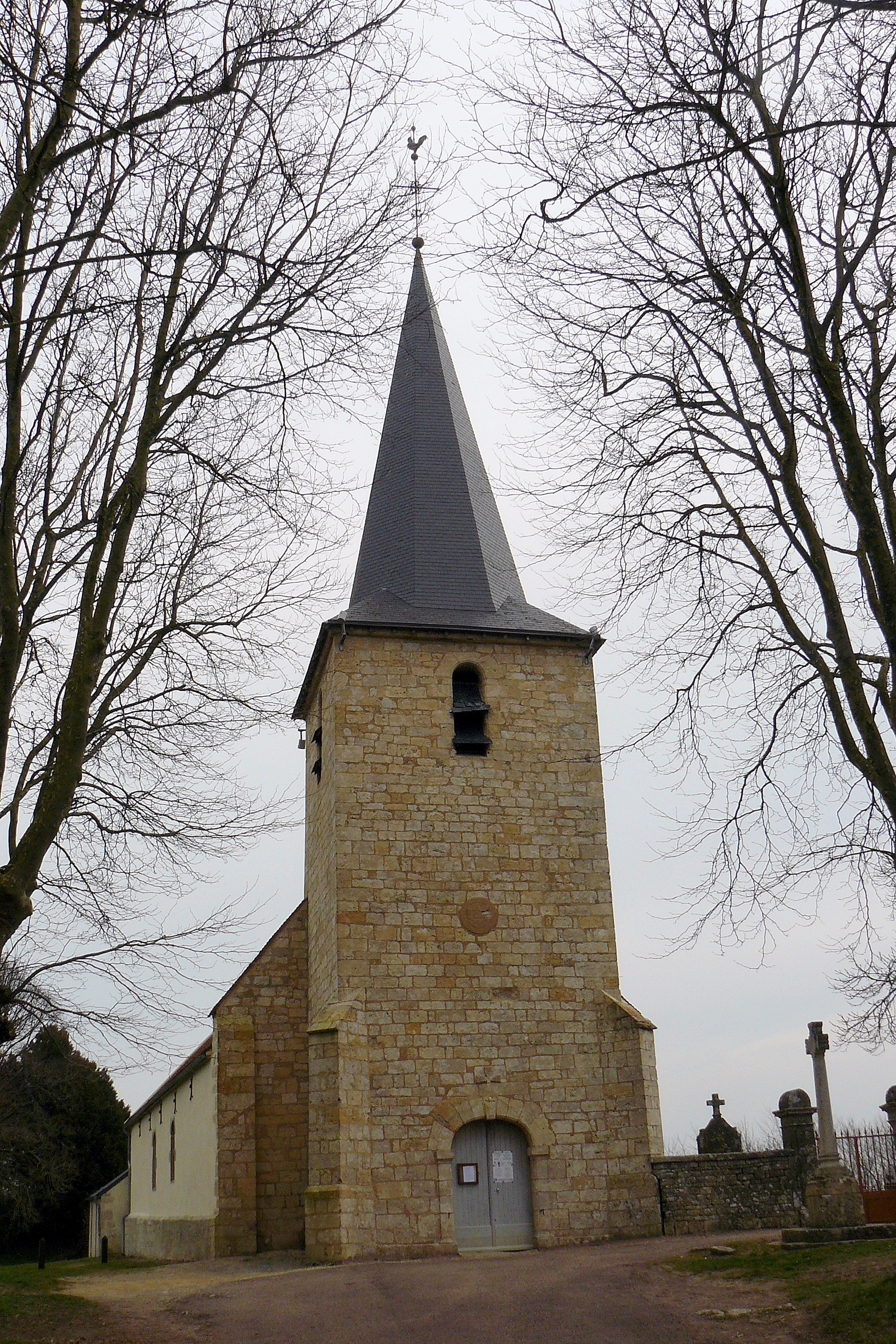
- The church in Montenoison
- Location of Montenoison
- Location within France Location within Bourgogne-Franche-Comté
- Coordinates: 47°12′59″N 3°25′40″E
- Country: France
- Region: Bourgogne-Franche-Comté
- Department: Nièvre
- Arrondissement: Cosne-Cours-sur-Loire
- Canton: La Charité-sur-Loire

Government
  - Mayor (2020–2026): Lucienne Gaudron
- Area^{1}: 16.73 km^{2} (6.46 sq mi)
- Highest elevation: 415 m (1,362 ft)
- Lowest elevation: 244 m (801 ft)
- Population (2023): 129
  - Density: 7.71/km^{2} (20.0/sq mi)
- Time zone: UTC+01:00 (CET)
  - Summer (DST): UTC+02:00 (CEST)
- INSEE/Postal code: 58174 /58700
- ^{1} French Land Register data, which excludes lakes, ponds, glaciers > 1 km^{2} (0.386 sq mi or 247 acres) and river estuaries.

Montenoison (French pronunciation: [mɔ̃tnwazɔ̃]) is a commune in the Nièvre department in central France.

== See also ==
- Communes of the Nièvre department
