= Mousa Naghi Zadeh =

- Born: June 5, 1979 (age 47); Tehran
- Nationality: Iran
- Style: Muay Thai, Coaching
- Rank: Muay Thai

Mousa Naghi Zadeh (born 5 June 1979 in Tehran) is an athlete and coach of the Iran National Muay Thai Team. He was able to lead the Iran National Team as coach to win the 2019 Asian Championship.
