= Mousa Ghaninejad =

Iranian economist

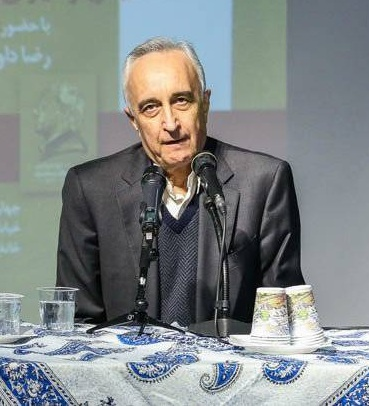
- Born: 1951 (age 74–75); Tabriz, Iran
- Education: University of Tehran (BS); Panthéon-Sorbonne University (MS, PhD)
- Occupations: Economist, professor, journalist
- Employers: Petroleum University of Technology; Sharif University of Technology; Donya-e-Eqtesad
- Notable work: Modernization and developments in Iran; Defeat in Freedom-seeking; Notes on Hayek and civil society; Freedom, Economics and Politics

Mousa Ghaninejad (born 1951 in Tabriz, Iran) is a senior Iranian economist. He has been an honorary visiting professor at the Sharif University of Technology and is currently a faculty member of Petroleum University of Technology. He was editor-in-chief of the daily economic newspaper, Donya-e-Eqtesad.

Contrary to most Iranian intellectuals, Ghaninejad believes in the priority of economic reform over political reform.

== Education ==
Ghaninejad got his bachelor's degree in accounting at the University of Tehran, after the Islamic revolution. He then moved to Paris, where he later completed his master's and doctorate degree in economics at Panthéon-Sorbonne University. Afterward, he continued to another doctorate there, Epistemology of economics, but abandoned it just before defending his thesis and moved back to Tehran.

== Selected bibliography ==
He has published books and articles mainly on philosophy, philosophy of economics, the epistemology of economics, history of economic ideas and economics and social developments in Iran; the most appraised ones include:

- Modernization and developments in Iran
- Defeat in Freedom-seeking
- Notes on Hayek and civil society
- Freedom, Economics and Politics.

== See also ==
- Intellectual movements in Iran
