= Beaumont-la-Ferrière =

- Commune
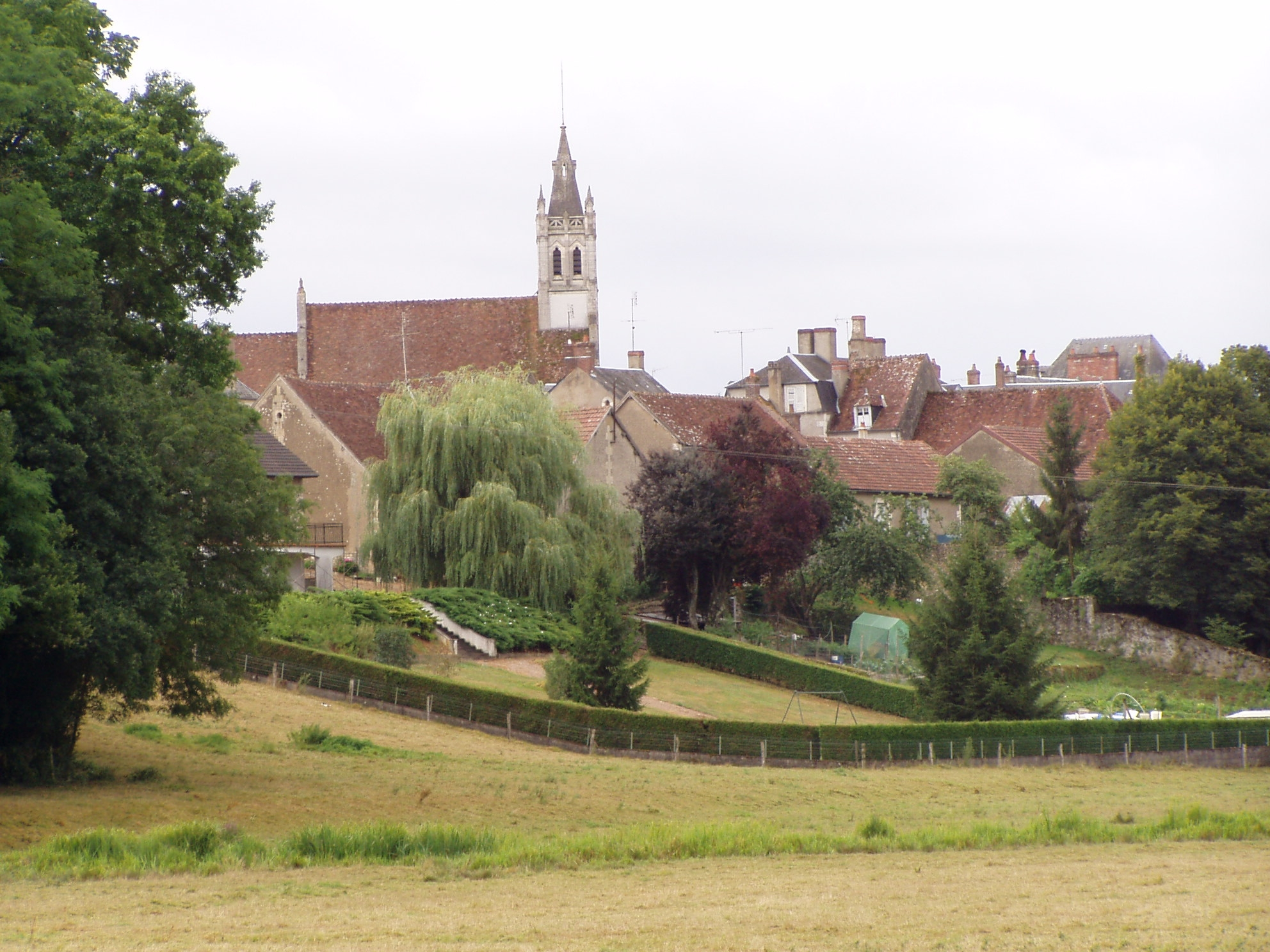
- A general view of Beaumont-la-Ferrière
- Location of Beaumont-la-Ferrière
- Location within France Location within Bourgogne-Franche-Comté
- Coordinates: 47°11′26″N 3°13′37″E
- Country: France
- Region: Bourgogne-Franche-Comté
- Department: Nièvre
- Arrondissement: Cosne-Cours-sur-Loire
- Canton: La Charité-sur-Loire

Government
  - Mayor (2020–2026): René Nicard
- Area^{1}: 28.13 km^{2} (10.86 sq mi)
- Highest elevation: 324 m (1,063 ft)
- Lowest elevation: 211 m (692 ft)
- Population (2023): 119
  - Density: 4.23/km^{2} (11.0/sq mi)
- Time zone: UTC+01:00 (CET)
  - Summer (DST): UTC+02:00 (CEST)
- INSEE/Postal code: 58027 /58700
- ^{1} French Land Register data, which excludes lakes, ponds, glaciers > 1 km^{2} (0.386 sq mi or 247 acres) and river estuaries.

Beaumont-la-Ferrière (French pronunciation: [bomɔ̃ la fɛʁjɛʁ]) is a commune in the Nièvre department in central France.

== Population ==
Historical population
Year	Pop.	±% p.a.
1968	194	—
1975	189	−0.37%
1982	195	+0.45%
1990	157	−2.67%
1999	144	−0.96%
2007	137	−0.62%
2012	126	−1.66%
2017	123	−0.48%
2023	119	−0.55%
Source: INSEE

== See also ==
- Communes of the Nièvre department
