= Prémery =

- Commune
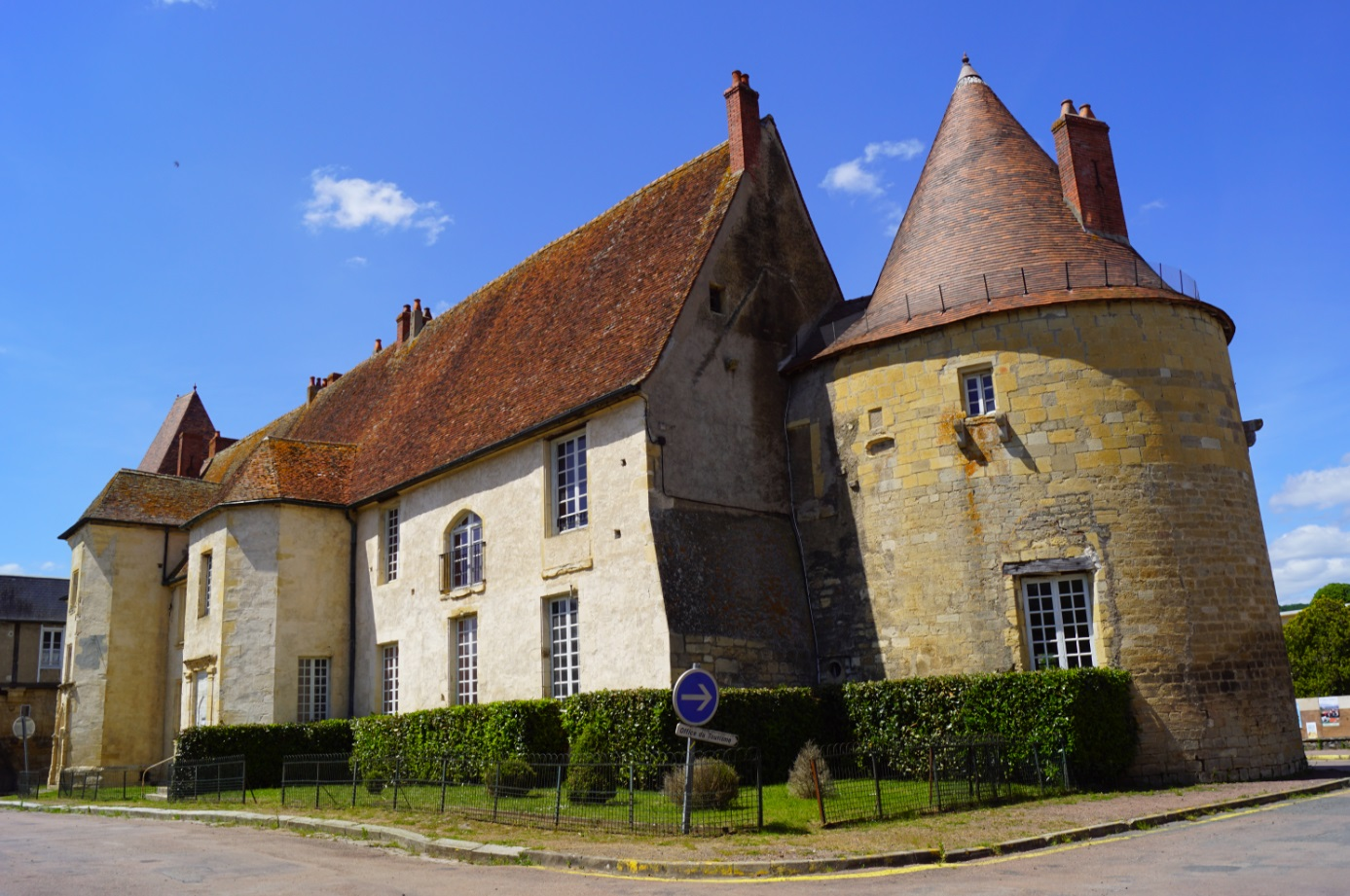
- The 14th-century Château des évêques de Nevers in Prémery

- Coat of arms
- Location of Prémery
- Location within France Location within Bourgogne-Franche-Comté
- Coordinates: 47°10′31″N 3°19′53″E
- Country: France
- Region: Bourgogne-Franche-Comté
- Department: Nièvre
- Arrondissement: Cosne-Cours-sur-Loire
- Canton: La Charité-sur-Loire
- Intercommunality: CC Les Bertranges

Government
  - Mayor (2020–2026): Alexis Plisson
- Area^{1}: 45.62 km^{2} (17.61 sq mi)
- Highest elevation: 386 m (1,266 ft)
- Lowest elevation: 218 m (715 ft)
- Population (2023): 1,734
  - Density: 38.01/km^{2} (98.44/sq mi)
- Demonym: Prémericois
- Time zone: UTC+01:00 (CET)
  - Summer (DST): UTC+02:00 (CEST)
- INSEE/Postal code: 58218 /58700
- Website: www.mairie-premery.fr
- ^{1} French Land Register data, which excludes lakes, ponds, glaciers > 1 km^{2} (0.386 sq mi or 247 acres) and river estuaries.

Prémery (French pronunciation: [pʁem(ə)ʁi]) is a commune in the Nièvre department in central France. It is in the heart of the Nivernais.

== History ==
In World War II, Prémery was a hub for Maquis activity within the French Resistance. On 9 August 1944, German occupying forces tortured to death Jean Sanson de Sansal in the forest of Prémery, a Maquisard who refused to lead them to the Maquis hideout.

== See also ==
- Communes of the Nièvre department
