= Narcy, Nièvre =

Narcy
- Commune
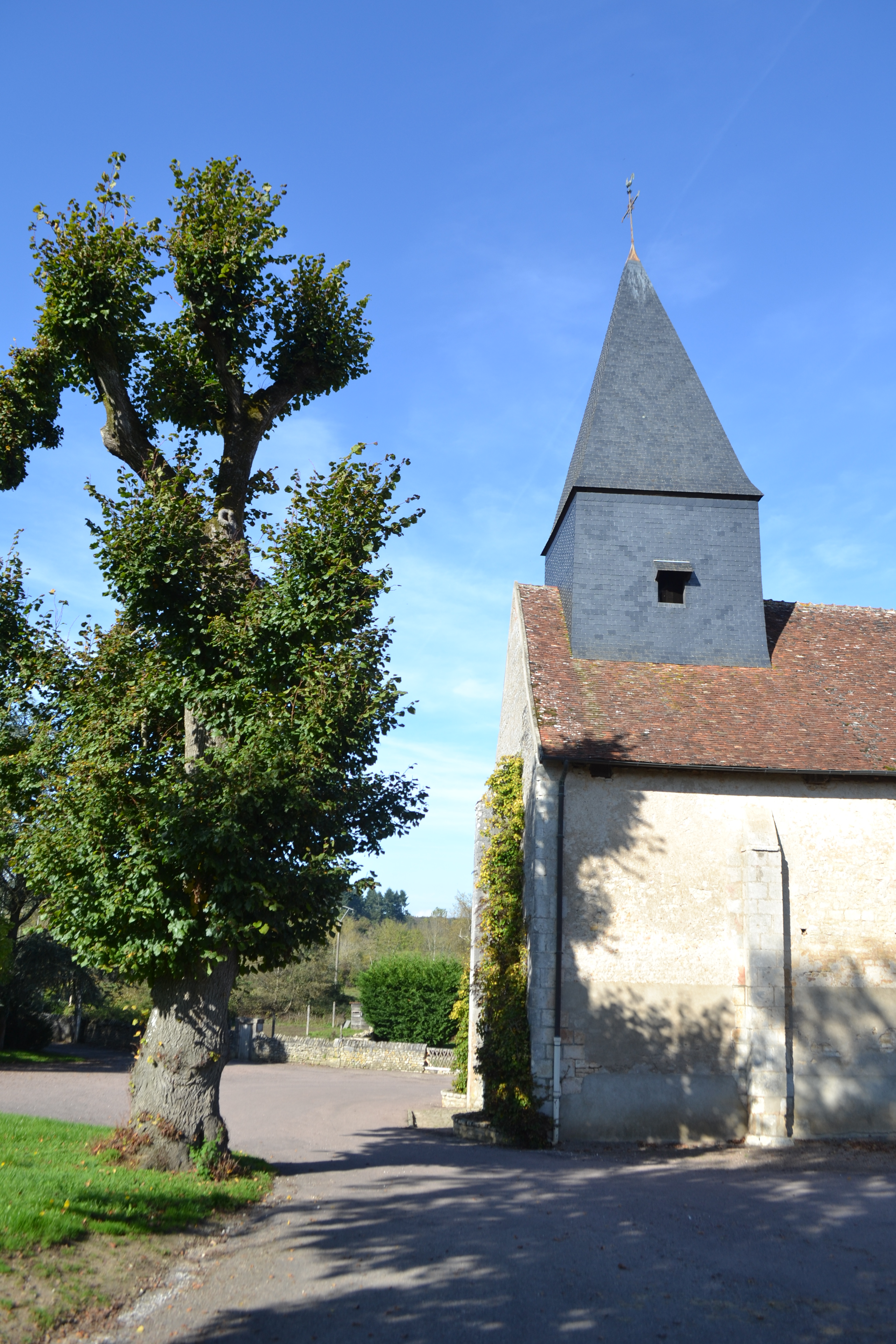
- The church in Narcy
- Location of Narcy
- Location within France Location within Bourgogne-Franche-Comté
- Coordinates: 47°14′13″N 3°04′10″E
- Country: France
- Region: Bourgogne-Franche-Comté
- Department: Nièvre
- Arrondissement: Cosne-Cours-sur-Loire
- Canton: La Charité-sur-Loire
- Intercommunality: Les Bertranges

Government
  - Mayor (2020–2026): Dominique Prévost
- Area^{1}: 29.14 km^{2} (11.25 sq mi)
- Highest elevation: 278 m (912 ft)
- Lowest elevation: 157 m (515 ft)
- Population (2023): 464
  - Density: 15.9/km^{2} (41.2/sq mi)
- Time zone: UTC+01:00 (CET)
  - Summer (DST): UTC+02:00 (CEST)
- INSEE/Postal code: 58189 /58400
- ^{1} French Land Register data, which excludes lakes, ponds, glaciers > 1 km^{2} (0.386 sq mi or 247 acres) and river estuaries.

Narcy (French pronunciation: [naʁsi]) is a commune in the Nièvre department and Bourgogne-Franche-Comté region of eastern France.

== Population ==
Historical population
Year	Pop.	±% p.a.
1968	620	—
1975	583	−0.88%
1982	575	−0.20%
1990	539	−0.80%
1999	490	−1.05%
2007	510	+0.50%
2012	547	+1.41%
2017	513	−1.28%
2023	464	−1.66%
Source: INSEE

== See also ==
- Communes of the Nièvre department
