= Nièvre (Loire) =

River in France, tributary of the Loire

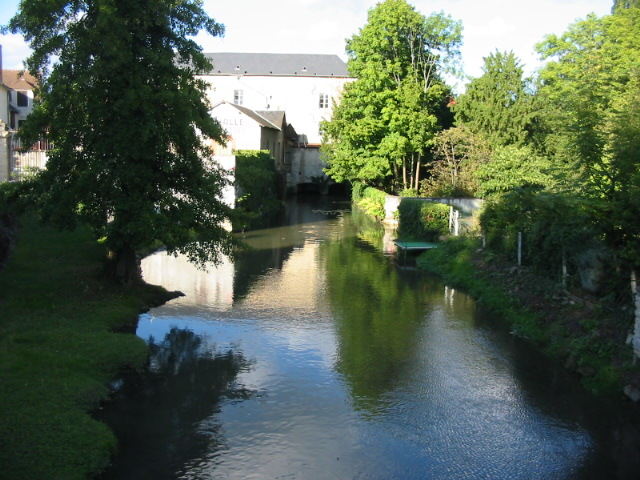

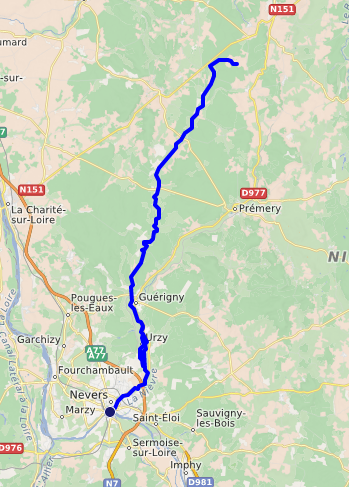

Location
- Country: France

Physical characteristics
- Source
  - location: Burgundy
- Mouth
  - location: Loire
  - coordinates: 46°59′5″N 3°9′32″E
- Length: 49.6 km (30.8 mi)

Basin features
- Progression: Loire→ Atlantic Ocean

The Nièvre (IPA: [njɛvʁ]) is a river in central France, a right tributary of the Loire. It flows through the département Nièvre.

Its source is in Champlemy. It flows generally south, through Guérigny, Urzy, and empties into the Loire in the town centre of Nevers.
