= Mousa Al-Barakah =

Qatari footballer (born 1989)

Personal information
- Full name: Mousa Al-Barakah Wahat
- Date of birth: 1 January 1989 (age 37)
- Place of birth: Qatar
- Height: 6 ft 2 in (1.88 m)
- Position: Defender

Team information
- Current team: Muaither
- Number: 13

Senior career*
Years	Team	Apps	(Gls)
2010–2013	El Jaish		
2012–2013	→ Al-Arabi (loan)	17	(1)
2013–2015	Al-Arabi	35	(1)
2015–2016	Al-Sailiya	3	(0)
2016–2017	Muaither	3	(0)
- * Club domestic league appearances and goals

Mousa Al-Barakah (Arabic:موسى البركة) (born 1 January 1989) is a Qatari footballer who played as a defender in the Qatar Stars League, mostly for Al-Arabi SC.
