= Champlemy =

- Commune
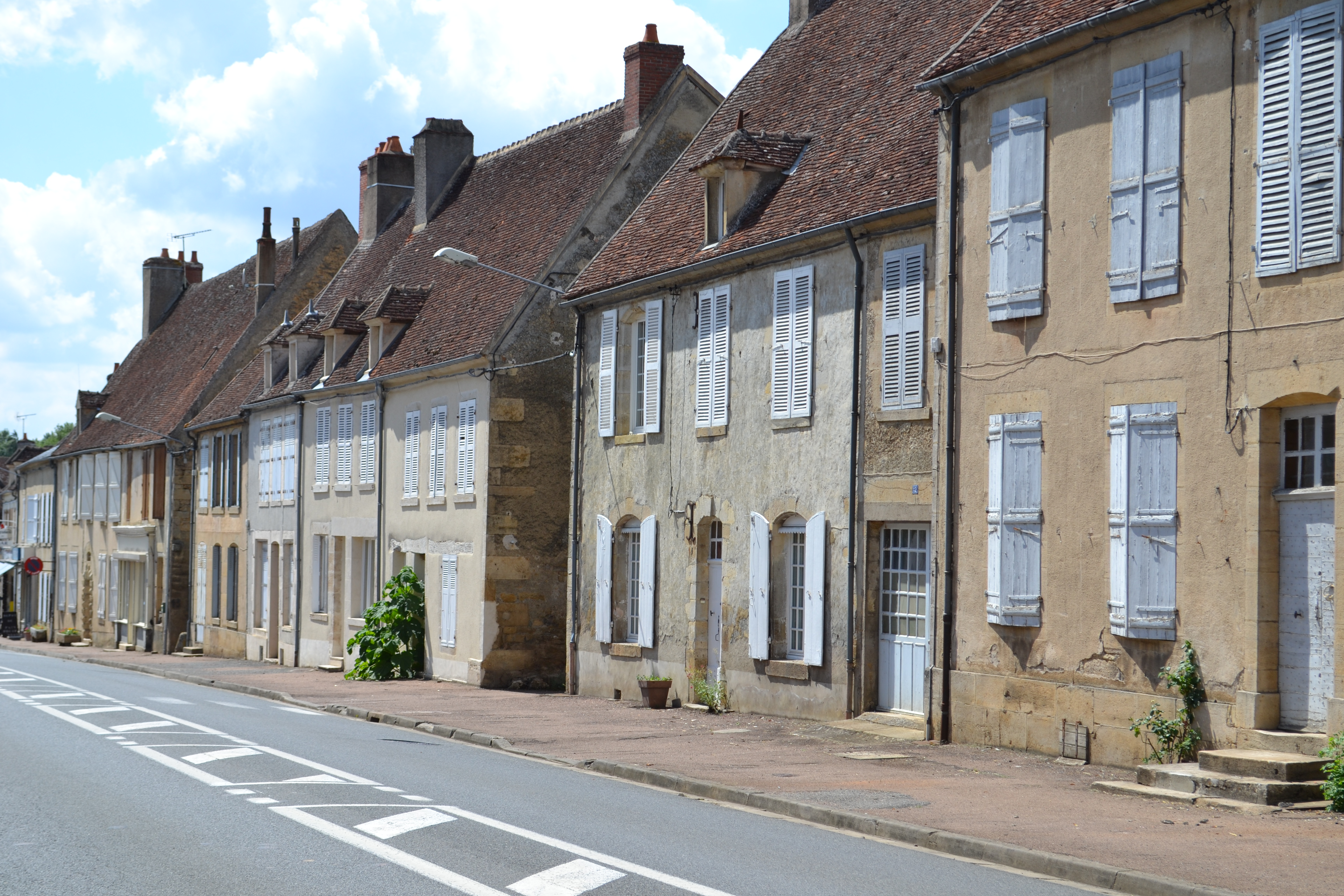
- Houses on the main road in Champlemy
- Location of Champlemy
- Location within France Location within Bourgogne-Franche-Comté
- Coordinates: 47°17′12″N 3°21′07″E
- Country: France
- Region: Bourgogne-Franche-Comté
- Department: Nièvre
- Arrondissement: Cosne-Cours-sur-Loire
- Canton: La Charité-sur-Loire

Government
  - Mayor (2020–2026): René Faust
- Area^{1}: 36.82 km^{2} (14.22 sq mi)
- Highest elevation: 381 m (1,250 ft)
- Lowest elevation: 240 m (790 ft)
- Population (2023): 305
  - Density: 8.28/km^{2} (21.5/sq mi)
- Time zone: UTC+01:00 (CET)
  - Summer (DST): UTC+02:00 (CEST)
- INSEE/Postal code: 58053 /58210
- ^{1} French Land Register data, which excludes lakes, ponds, glaciers > 1 km^{2} (0.386 sq mi or 247 acres) and river estuaries.

Champlemy (French pronunciation: [ʃɑ̃pləmi]) is a commune in the Nièvre department in central France.

== Demographics ==
In 2019, the population was 325.

== See also ==
- Communes of the Nièvre department
