= Suilly-la-Tour =

- Commune
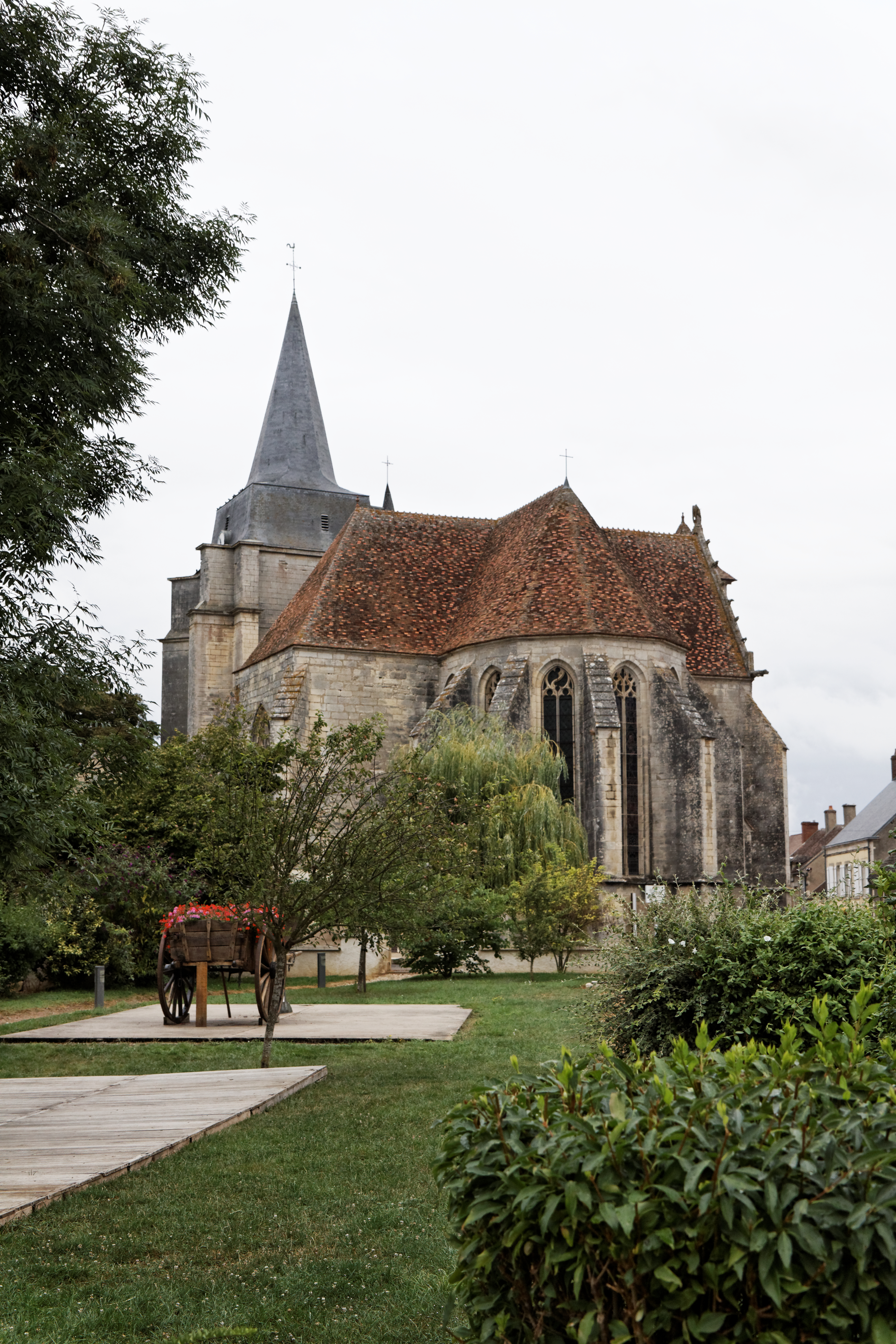
- The church of Saint-Symphorien, in Suilly-la-Tour

- Coat of arms
- Location of Suilly-la-Tour
- Location within France Location within Bourgogne-Franche-Comté
- Coordinates: 47°20′15″N 3°04′00″E
- Country: France
- Region: Bourgogne-Franche-Comté
- Department: Nièvre
- Arrondissement: Cosne-Cours-sur-Loire
- Canton: Pouilly-sur-Loire
- Area^{1}: 36.91 km^{2} (14.25 sq mi)
- Highest elevation: 237 m (778 ft)
- Lowest elevation: 158 m (518 ft)
- Population (2023): 569
  - Density: 15.4/km^{2} (39.9/sq mi)
- Time zone: UTC+01:00 (CET)
  - Summer (DST): UTC+02:00 (CEST)
- INSEE/Postal code: 58281 /58150
- ^{1} French Land Register data, which excludes lakes, ponds, glaciers > 1 km^{2} (0.386 sq mi or 247 acres) and river estuaries.

Suilly-la-Tour (French pronunciation: [sɥiji la tuʁ]) is a commune in the Nièvre department in central France.

== Geography ==
Suilly-la-Tour is located about 48 km north-northwest of Nevers, along the Nohain. It borders Donzy to the north and east, Sainte-Colombe-des-Bois to the east and southeast, Vielmanay to the southeast and south, Garchy to the south and southwest, Saint-Quentin-sur-Nohain to the west, and Saint-Martin-sur-Nohain to the northwest.

== Population ==
Year	1962	1968	1975	1982	1990	1999	2006	2011	2016	2022
Population	915	886	799	716	633	588	558	606	600	575

Sources: Cassini and INSEE

== Places of interest ==
- Saint-Symphorien Church, classified as a Monument historique since 1914.
- Les Granges Castle, dating from the 16th and 17th centuries; parts of the castle have been protected as a Monument historique since 1974 and 1983.
- A former 17th-century ironworks, parts of which have been listed as a Monument historique since 2008.
- Vergers Castle, dating from the 15th century.

== See also ==
- Communes of the Nièvre department
