= Pouilly-sur-Loire AOC =

Pouilly-sur-Loire
- Wine region
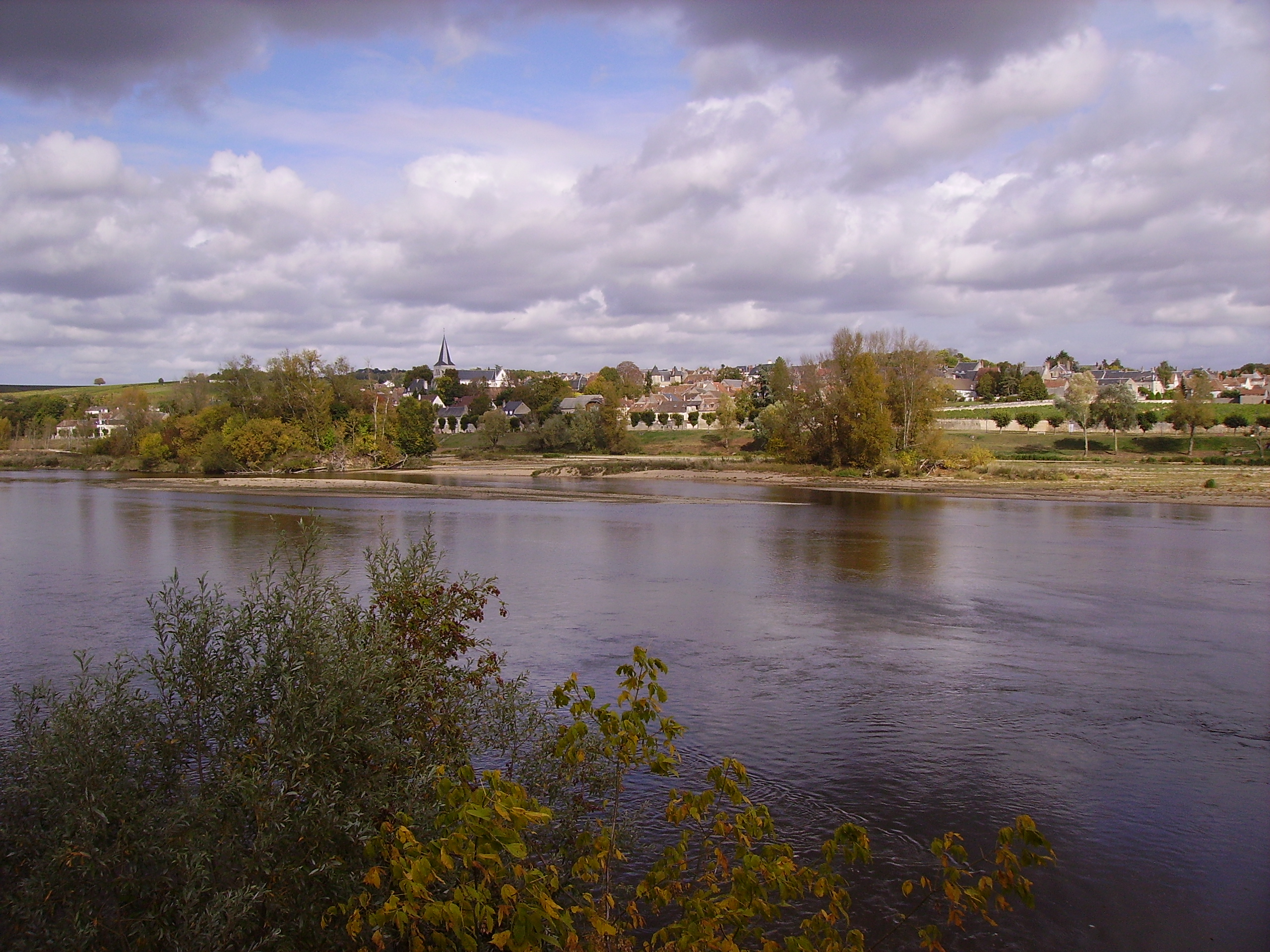
- Pouilly-sur-Loire in 2009
- Type: AOC
- Year established: 1937
- Country: France
- Total area: 60 ha
- Grapes produced: Chasselas

Pouilly-sur-Loire (French pronunciation: [puji syʁ lwaʁ]) is an Appellation d'Origine Contrôlée (AOC) for white wine in the Loire Valley region of France. It is specifically produced around Pouilly-sur-Loire in the Nièvre department and was awarded AOC status by a decree issued on 31 July 1937

== Geography ==
The vineyards cover 60 hectares (150 acres) on the right bank of the Loire, opposite the Sancerre vineyards.

The appellation's area covers the communes of Garchy, Mesves-sur-Loire, Pouilly-sur-Loire, Saint-Andelain, Saint-Laurent-l'Abbaye, Saint-Martin-sur-Nohain and Tracy-sur-Loire in the Nièvre department.

== Description ==
Pouilly-sur-Loire is mainly produced from Chasselas grapes, with Sauvignon Blanc as a supplementary variety. (Its more famous neighbours Sancerre and Pouilly-Fumé are made from Sauvignon Blanc only.)

It is a pale yellow in colour. The wine is light and lively.
