= Pouilly-Fumé =

French wine region in the Loire valley

Pouilly Fumé
- Wine region
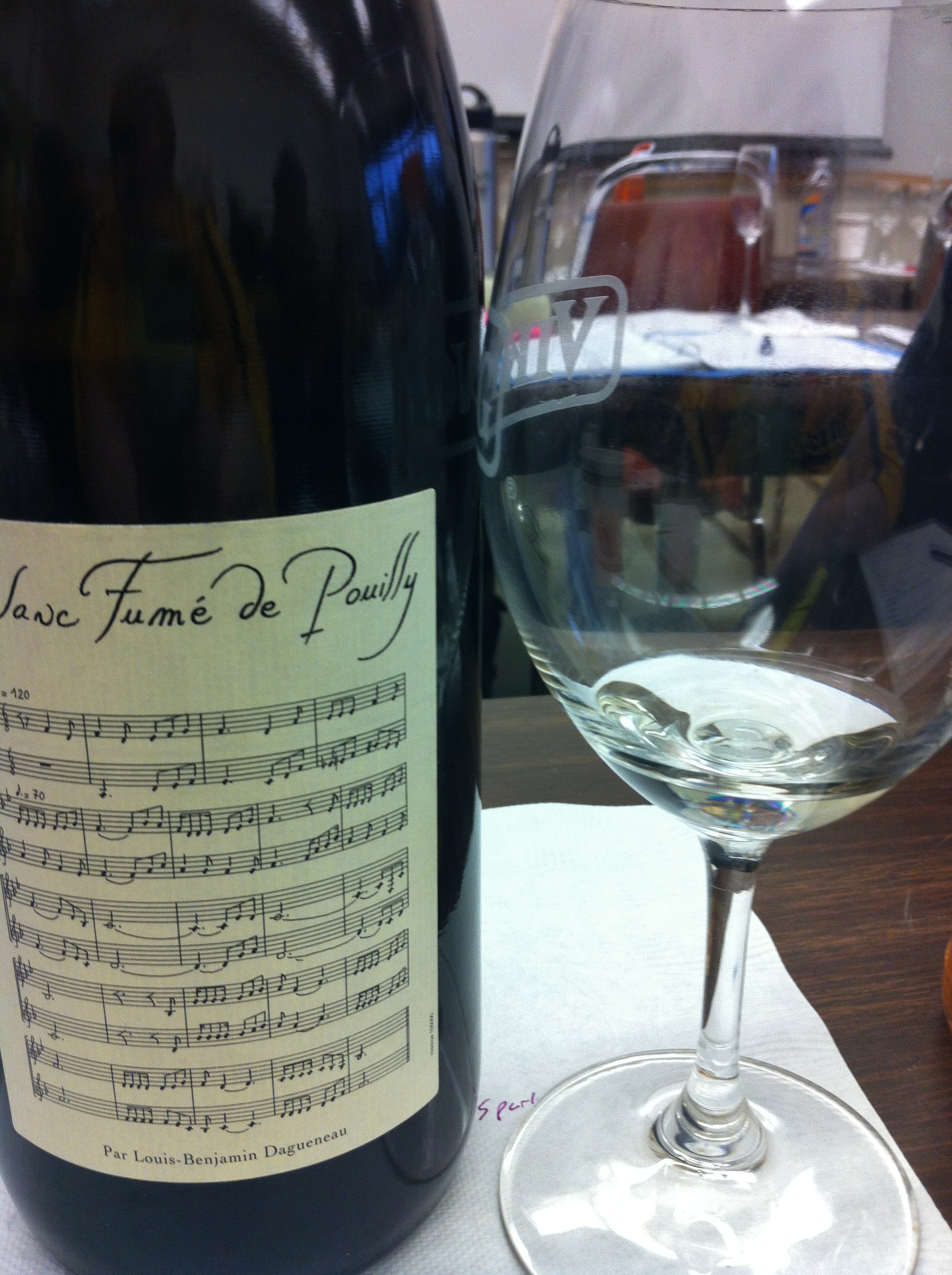
- Other names: blanc-fumé de Pouilly
- Type: AOC
- Year established: 1937
- Country: France
- Part of: Nivernais
- Climate region: moderate temperate oceanic
- Soil conditions: kimmeridgian marl and clay with flints
- Total area: 1,200 hectares
- Varietals produced: Sauvignon blanc
- Wine produced: From 65 to 75 hl/ha

Pouilly-Fumé (French pronunciation: [puji fyme]) is an appellation d'origine contrôlée (AOC) for the dry sauvignon blanc white wine produced around Pouilly-sur-Loire, in the Nièvre département. Another white wine produced in the same area but with a different grape variety is called Pouilly-sur-Loire.

== Etymology ==
Pouilly-Fumé is made purely from sauvignon blanc, a type of vine whose clusters are formed of small ovoid grapes, pressed against each other and resembling small bird eggs. At maturity, these grapes are coated with a grey bloom, the color of smoke—which explains why Pouilly winegrowers talk of "white smoke" to describe the type of vine or the wines made from it. "Fumé" also refers to the smoky bouquet (the renowned "gun flint aroma"), bestowed by the terroir vineyards of Pouilly-sur-Loire.

== History ==
=== Antiquity ===
The vineyards of Pouilly-Fumé date back to the fifth century. The area was a Gallo-Roman estate dating back to the early days of the Roman Empire. The name derives from the Latin Pauliacum super fluvium ligerim (Pauliacum on the River Loire), reflecting the Roman road which passed through this locality.

=== Middle Ages ===
Benedictine monks commenced development of Pouilly-Fumé in the Middle Ages. Sacramental wine is traditionally white, less prone to staining, and the Benedictines developed the vineyards without seeking profitability. The fiefdom and vineyards of Pouilly were transferred to the Benedictines of La Charité-sur-Loire for the sum of "3100 sous and a silver mark" towards the end of the eleventh century. A plot of about 4 hectares (9.9 acres) overlooking the River Loire has retained the appellation Loge aux Moines (Monks’ Lodge), in memory of that era. The repurchase of Boisgibault lands in 1383 by Jean III de Sancerre demonstrates the proximity that has always existed between this vineyard and that of Sancerre, and their respective white wine production.

=== Modern period ===
Despite floods and low water, transport of Pouilly wines via the Loire was efficient and fast, due to the location of the vineyard. This wine was always exported by water navigation, especially after the opening of the Canal de Briare in 1642. After the French Revolution of 1789, peasants were able to become owners of land and vineyards formerly possessions of the nobility and clergy.

At the end of the nineteenth century, growers were faced with mildew and phylloxera. The vineyard was devastated and many cultivators had to redeploy. After many unsuccessful attempts at treatment, the vines were uprooted in the early twentieth century and only part of the vineyard was replanted after grafting onto American rootstock.

=== Contemporary period ===
Pouilly-Fumé has been an Appellation d'origine contrôlée (AOC) since 1937. Today a large part of the production is sold abroad, especially to Great Britain.

== Location ==
The following vineyard communes are to be found in the Nièvre, to the east of the Loire: Pouilly-sur-Loire, Saint-Andelain, Tracy-sur-Loire (village Boisgibault), Saint-Laurent-l'Abbaye, Mesves-sur-Loire, Saint-Martin-sur-Nohain, Garchy.

=== Orography ===
The terrain is slightly undulating because the Loire river created the valley; Sancerre is on a promontory the other side of the river.

=== Geology ===
The soil consists of three major types: Kimmeridgian marl, hard limestone and flint clay.

=== Climate ===
The climate is temperate with a slight tendency to continental.

== Vineyard ==
The Nièvre vineyard is spread over 1,200 hectares (3,000 acres), with 120 winemakers annually producing approximately 70,400 hectolitres (1,860,000 US gal).

This varietal Sauvignon is similar to those of the vineyards of Sancerre. It should not be confused with Pouilly-Fuissé, a chardonnay wine from the south of Burgundy (Mâcon).
