= A77 autoroute =

Road in France

A77 autoroute
- Autoroute de l'Arbre

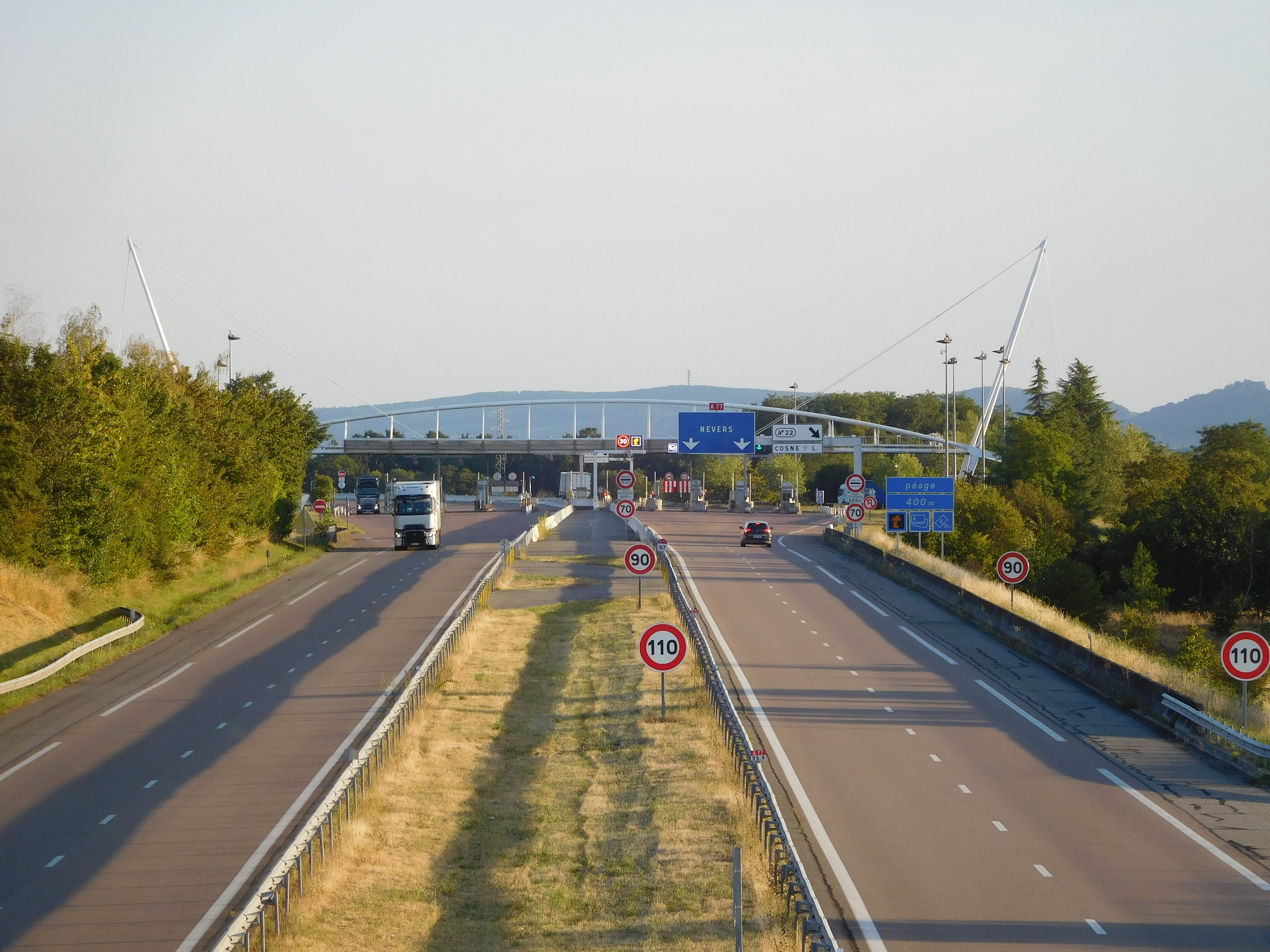
- Myennes toll on

Route information
- Length: 161 km (100 mi)
- Existed: 1971–present

Major junctions
- North end: E15 / A 6 in Poligny

- A 19 in Montargis
- South end: N 7 in Sermoise-sur-Loire

Location
- Country: France

Highway system
- Roads in France; Autoroutes; Routes nationales

The A77 autoroute is a motorway in central France. The road starts at the hamlet of Rosiers in Seine-et-Marne and finishes to the south of Nevers in Nièvre. It is also known as the l'Arbre - the motorway of the Tree.

It has been designed to minimise its effect on the environment. Each of the rest areas bears the name of a species. The road has been integrated into the landscape helped by zoologists to allow the passage of the animals (wild or cattle) from one side of the road to the other, as in the forest of Montargis. This added to the cost of construction.

== Rosiers to Cosne-Cours-sur-Loire ==
The motorway is managed by the company the Autoroute Paris-Rhin-Rhône (APRR). It is a toll road with 2x2 lanes and totals 96 km (60 mi).

- Before 1999: The A77 was formed by re-numbering an old motorway connection to the A6 autoroute. The road was the upgraded N7 to Dordives. The toll road follows the valley of the Loing.
- 1999: Opening of the Dordives - Briare section of 68 km (42 mi)
- 2000: Opening of the Briare - Cosne-Cours-sur-Loire section of 33 km (21 mi)
- 2009: Opening of the junction with the A19 autoroute.

== Cosne-sur-Loire to Nevers - south ==
The motorway is managed by the département of Nièvre. It is a free motorway with 2x2 lanes.

- From 1992 to 2004: Phased opening of the section Cosne to Nevers-South

== Nevers - south to Moulins ==
Plans are to extend the motorway to Moulins, with sections already under construction on the existing RN7. The by-pass of Moulins and Villeneuve-sur-Allier has already been completed to autoroute standard. As of December 2022, the plans have not been completed.

== List of exits and junctions ==
Region	Department	Junction	Destinations	Notes
Île-de-France	Seine-et-Marne	A6 - A77	Paris, Fontainebleau, Nemours	
Île-de-France	Seine-et-Marne	Péage du Val de Loing		
Île-de-France	Seine-et-Marne	17 : Dordives	Souppes-sur-Loing, Dordives	
Centre-Val de Loire	Loiret			
Centre-Val de Loire	Loiret	Aire du Hêtre Pourpre (Southbound); Aire du Sophora (Northbound)		
Centre-Val de Loire	Loiret	A19 - A77	Orléans (A10), Sens, Montargis - nord, Metz, Nancy	
Centre-Val de Loire	Loiret	18 : Tourneau	Montargis - centre, Sully-sur-Loire, Châteauneuf-sur-Loire	
Centre-Val de Loire	Loiret	Aire du Cèdre (Southbound); Aire du Liquidambar (Northbound)		
Centre-Val de Loire	Loiret	18.1 : Varennes-Changy	Nogent-sur-Vernisson, Varennes-Changy	Entry and exit from Paris
Centre-Val de Loire	Loiret	Aire du Jardin des Arbres		
Centre-Val de Loire	Loiret	19 : Gien	Gien, Nogent-sur-Vernisson, Bourges, Vierzon	
Centre-Val de Loire	Loiret	Aire du Ginkgo (Southbound); Aire du Tulipier (Northbound)		
Centre-Val de Loire	Loiret	20 : Briare	Châtillon-sur-Loire, Briare, Orléans, Gien	
Centre-Val de Loire	Loiret	21 : Saint-Fargeau	Saint-Fargeau, Bonny-sur-Loire, Auxerre	
Bourgogne-Franche-Comté	Nièvre	Aire du Caule (Southbound); Aire du Séquoia (Northbound)		
Bourgogne-Franche-Comté	Nièvre	Péage de Myennes		
Bourgogne-Franche-Comté	Nièvre	22 : Cosne - nord	Cosne-Cours-sur-Loire, Saint-Amand-en-Puisaye	
Bourgogne-Franche-Comté	Nièvre	22.1 : Cosne - est	Cosne-Cours-sur-Loire, Alligny, Saint-Père	Entry and exit from Nevers
Bourgogne-Franche-Comté	Nièvre	23 : Cosne - sud	Cosne-Cours-sur-Loire - Z. I. Sud, Donzy	
Bourgogne-Franche-Comté	Nièvre	24 : Sancerre	Jaligny-sur-Besbre, Dompierre-sur-Besbre, Bourbon-Lancy	
Bourgogne-Franche-Comté	Nièvre	24 : Sancerre	Aire des Vignobles	
Bourgogne-Franche-Comté	Nièvre	25 : Pouilly-sur-Loire - nord	Pouilly-sur-Loire, Saint-Andelain	
Bourgogne-Franche-Comté	Nièvre	Aire de Pouilly (Southbound)		
Bourgogne-Franche-Comté	Nièvre	26 : Pouilly-sur-Loire - sud	Pouilly-sur-Loire, Narcy	
Bourgogne-Franche-Comté	Nièvre	Aire de Pouilly (Northbound)		
Bourgogne-Franche-Comté	Nièvre	27 : Mesves-sur-Loire	Mesves-sur-Loire, Bulcy, Narcy	
Bourgogne-Franche-Comté	Nièvre	28 : La Charité-sur-Loire - nord	La Charité-sur-Loire	
Bourgogne-Franche-Comté	Nièvre	Aire de La Charité-sur-Loire (Southbound)		
Bourgogne-Franche-Comté	Nièvre	29 : La Charité-sur-Loire - Z. I.	La Charité-sur-Loire, Varzy, Clamecy, Prémery, Auxerre	
Bourgogne-Franche-Comté	Nièvre	Aire de la Marche (Northbound)		
Bourgogne-Franche-Comté	Nièvre	30 : La Marche	Tronsanges, La Marche	
Bourgogne-Franche-Comté	Nièvre	31 : Pougues-les-Eaux - nord	Pougues-les-Eaux, Chaulgnes	
Bourgogne-Franche-Comté	Nièvre	Aire de Pougues		
Bourgogne-Franche-Comté	Nièvre	32 : Pougues-les-Eaux - sud	Pougues-les-Eaux, Garchizy, Fourchambault	
Bourgogne-Franche-Comté	Nièvre	33 : Nevers - nord	Nevers - centre, Varennes-Vauzelles	
Bourgogne-Franche-Comté	Nièvre	34 : Nevers - centre	Nevers, Auxerre, Clamecy, Guérigny, Coulanges-lès-Nevers	
Bourgogne-Franche-Comté	Nièvre	36 : Nevers - est	Saint-Éloi, Decize, Les jardins maraîchers de la Baratte, Château-Chinon (Ville), Imphy	
Bourgogne-Franche-Comté	Nièvre	37 : Nevers - sud	Nevers - centre, La Guerche-sur-l'Aubois, Sermoise-sur-Loire, Challuy, Bourges	
A 77 becomes N 7
1.000 mi = 1.609 km; 1.000 km = 0.621 mi

== Village étape ==
The Autoroute is served by the following Village étape, Pougues-les-Eaux.
