= Didier Dagueneau =

French winemaker

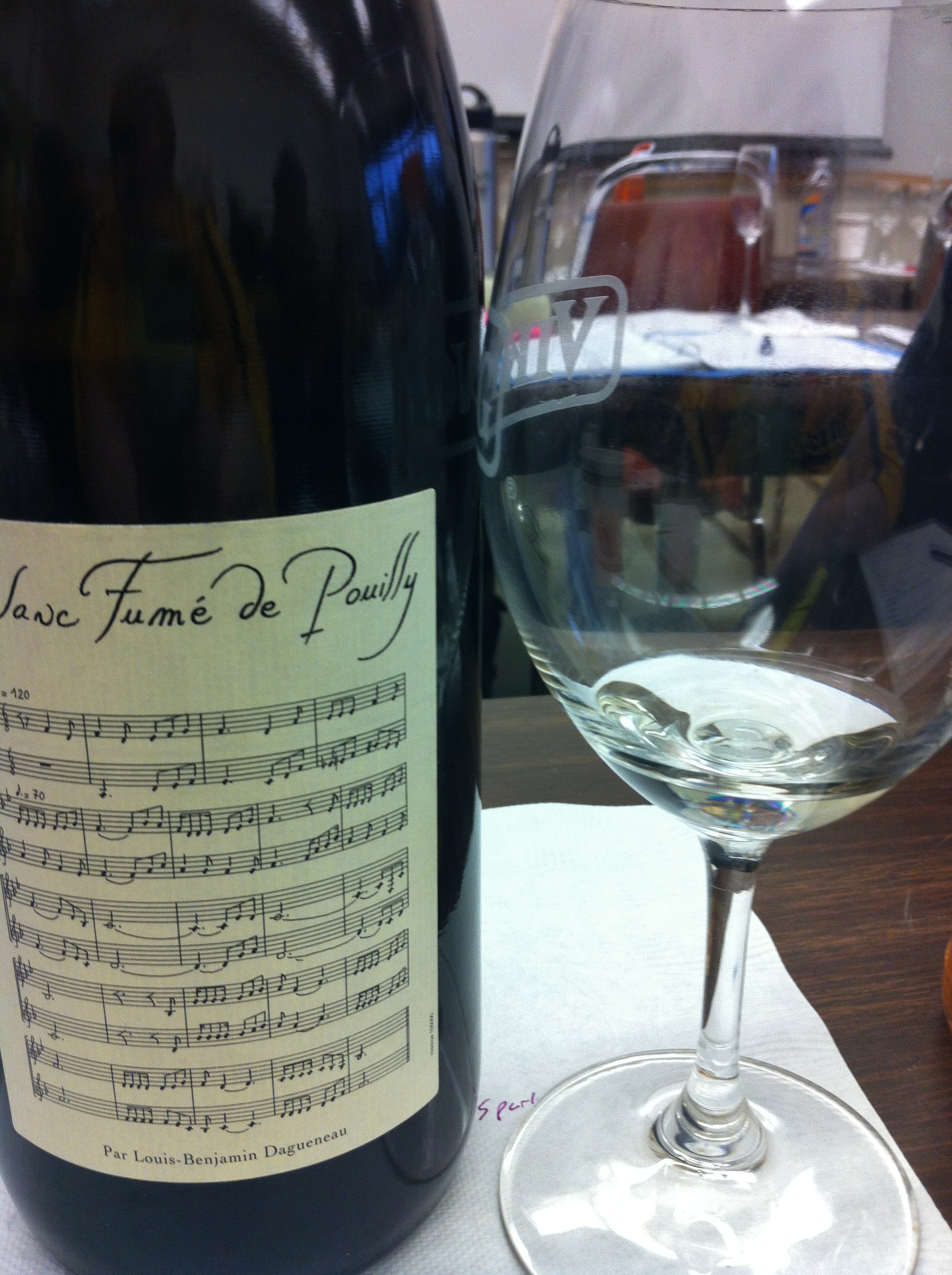
One of the Pouilly Fumé wines taken over by Dagueneau's son, Benjamin.

Didier Dagueneau (1956 – 17 September 2008) was a winemaker in the Loire Valley who received a cult following for his Sauvignon blanc wines from the Pouilly Fumé appellation. He died on 17 September 2008, in an ultralight plane crash in the Cognac region of France. He is survived by two children with his ex-wife Martine, Benjamin and Charlotte, who work at the domaine, and two children with his partner Suzan Cremer, Aaron and Léon.

== Winemaking ==
Dagueneau was born in 1956 in Saint-Andelain, Nièvre, Burgundy. His winery with 12 hectares (30 acres) of vineyards was in the town of Saint-Andelain, in Pouilly Fumé. He was seeking to make "the best Sauvignon blanc in the world". He made a variety of different cuveés, including Buisson-Renard, Pur Sang (French for "pureblood"), Asteroïde, and Silex ("flint"). Somewhat unusually for the appellation and grape variety, many of his wines were meant for cellaring and some had a clear influence of oak. He was also developing vineyards in Jurançon.

An ex-motorcycle racer with no formal enological training Dagueneau clashed with other winegrowers about "typicité" ("typicity" or "showing its origin") while achieving unprecedented prices for the region.

His vineyard practices were a combination of the exacting (extremely low yields, hand harvesting in multiple passes) with the unusual, such as using horses to plow the soil between vines. He was described as a risk taker and an experimenter, with perfectionist attitudes to his work, cutting yields severely to achieve greater ripeness.
