= Annay =

Annay is the name or part of the name of several communes in France:

- Annay, Nièvre, in the Nièvre department
- Annay, Pas-de-Calais, in the Pas-de-Calais department
- Annay-la-Côte, in the Yonne department
- Annay-sur-Serein, in the Yonne department
