= Dampierre-sous-Bouhy =

- Commune
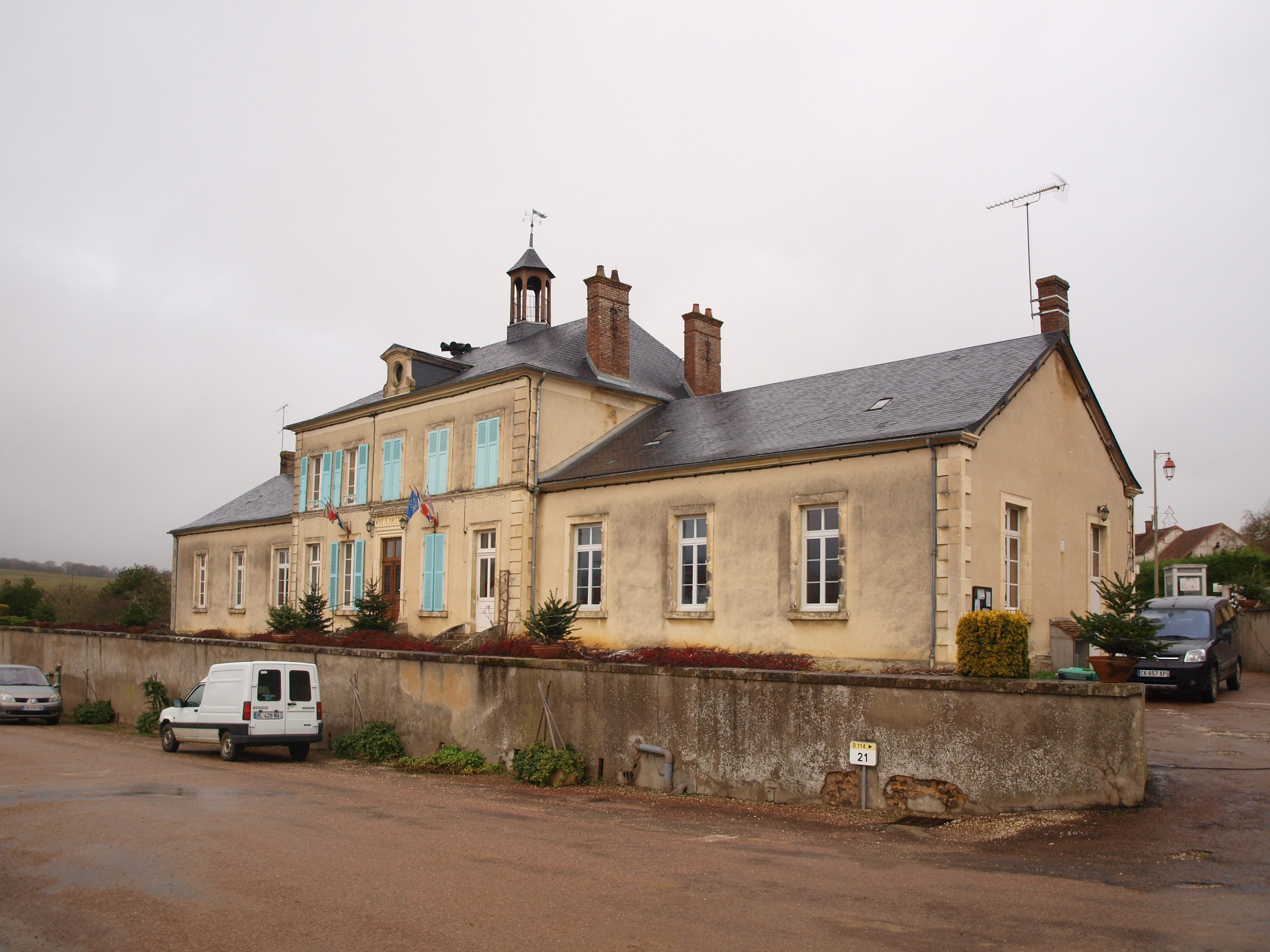
- The town hall in Dampierre-sous-Bouhy

- Coat of arms
- Location of Dampierre-sous-Bouhy
- Location within France Location within Bourgogne-Franche-Comté
- Coordinates: 47°30′00″N 3°08′06″E
- Country: France
- Region: Bourgogne-Franche-Comté
- Department: Nièvre
- Arrondissement: Cosne-Cours-sur-Loire
- Canton: Pouilly-sur-Loire

Government
  - Mayor (2020–2026): Chantal Reverdy
- Area^{1}: 26.90 km^{2} (10.39 sq mi)
- Highest elevation: 346 m (1,135 ft)
- Lowest elevation: 187 m (614 ft)
- Population (2023): 461
  - Density: 17.1/km^{2} (44.4/sq mi)
- Time zone: UTC+01:00 (CET)
  - Summer (DST): UTC+02:00 (CEST)
- INSEE/Postal code: 58094 /58310
- ^{1} French Land Register data, which excludes lakes, ponds, glaciers > 1 km^{2} (0.386 sq mi or 247 acres) and river estuaries.

Dampierre-sous-Bouhy (French pronunciation: [dɑ̃pjɛʁ su bu.i], literally Dampierre under Bouhy) is a commune in the Nièvre department in central France.

== Demography ==
Historical population
Year	Pop.	±% p.a.
1968	630	—
1975	558	−1.72%
1982	572	+0.35%
1990	484	−2.07%
1999	470	−0.33%
2007	484	+0.37%
2012	471	−0.54%
2017	457	−0.60%
2023	461	+0.15%
Source: INSEE

== See also ==
- Communes of the Nièvre department
