= Colméry =

- Commune
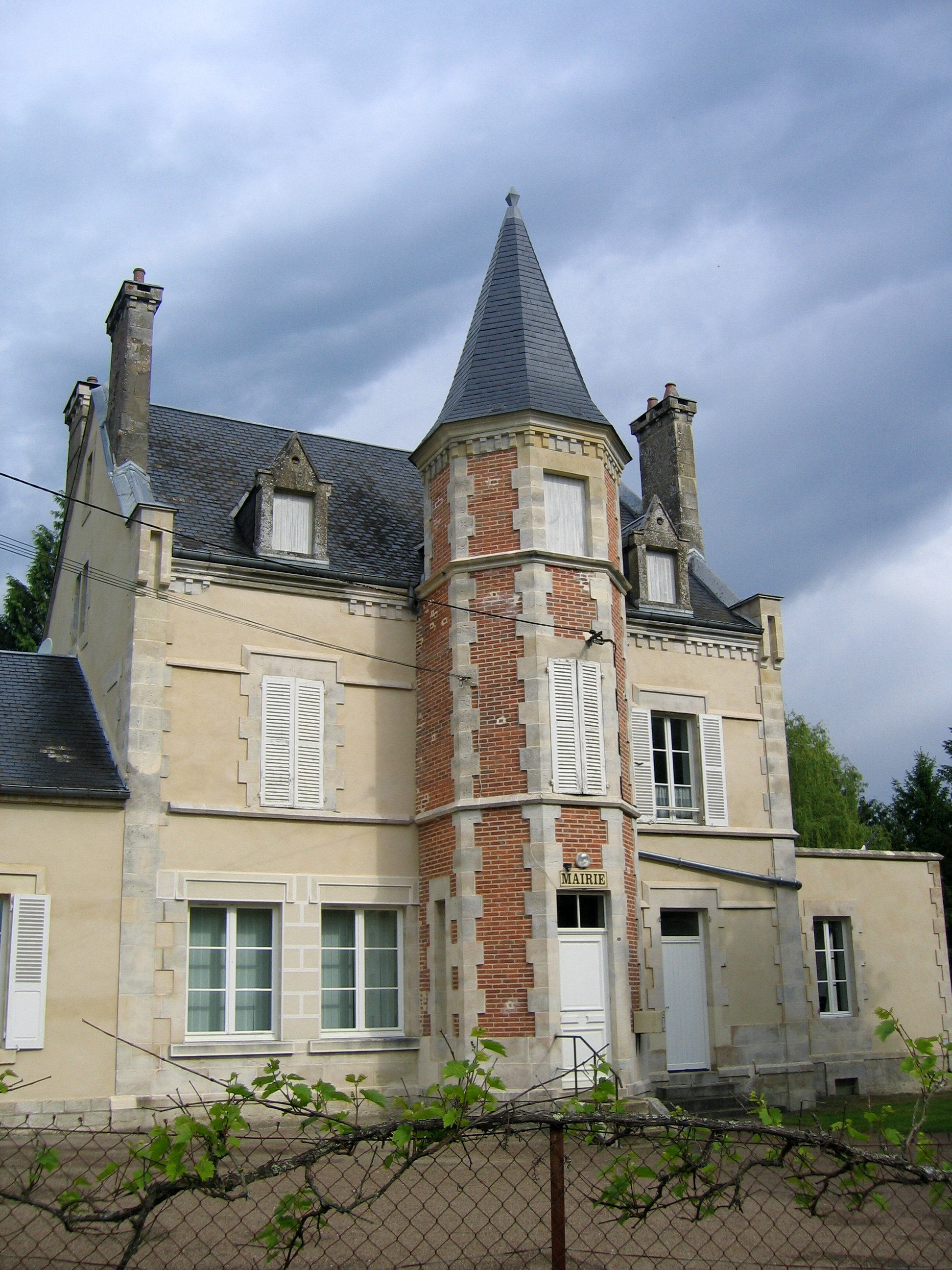
- The town hall in Colméry
- Location of Colméry
- Location within France Location within Bourgogne-Franche-Comté
- Coordinates: 47°20′54″N 3°15′05″E
- Country: France
- Region: Bourgogne-Franche-Comté
- Department: Nièvre
- Arrondissement: Cosne-Cours-sur-Loire
- Canton: Pouilly-sur-Loire

Government
  - Mayor (2020–2026): André Buisson
- Area^{1}: 24.17 km^{2} (9.33 sq mi)
- Highest elevation: 360 m (1,180 ft)
- Lowest elevation: 200 m (660 ft)
- Population (2023): 268
  - Density: 11.1/km^{2} (28.7/sq mi)
- Time zone: UTC+01:00 (CET)
  - Summer (DST): UTC+02:00 (CEST)
- INSEE/Postal code: 58081 /58350
- ^{1} French Land Register data, which excludes lakes, ponds, glaciers > 1 km^{2} (0.386 sq mi or 247 acres) and river estuaries.

Colméry (French pronunciation: [kɔlmeʁi]) is a commune in the Nièvre department in central France.

== See also ==
- Communes of the Nièvre department
