= Arquian =

- Commune
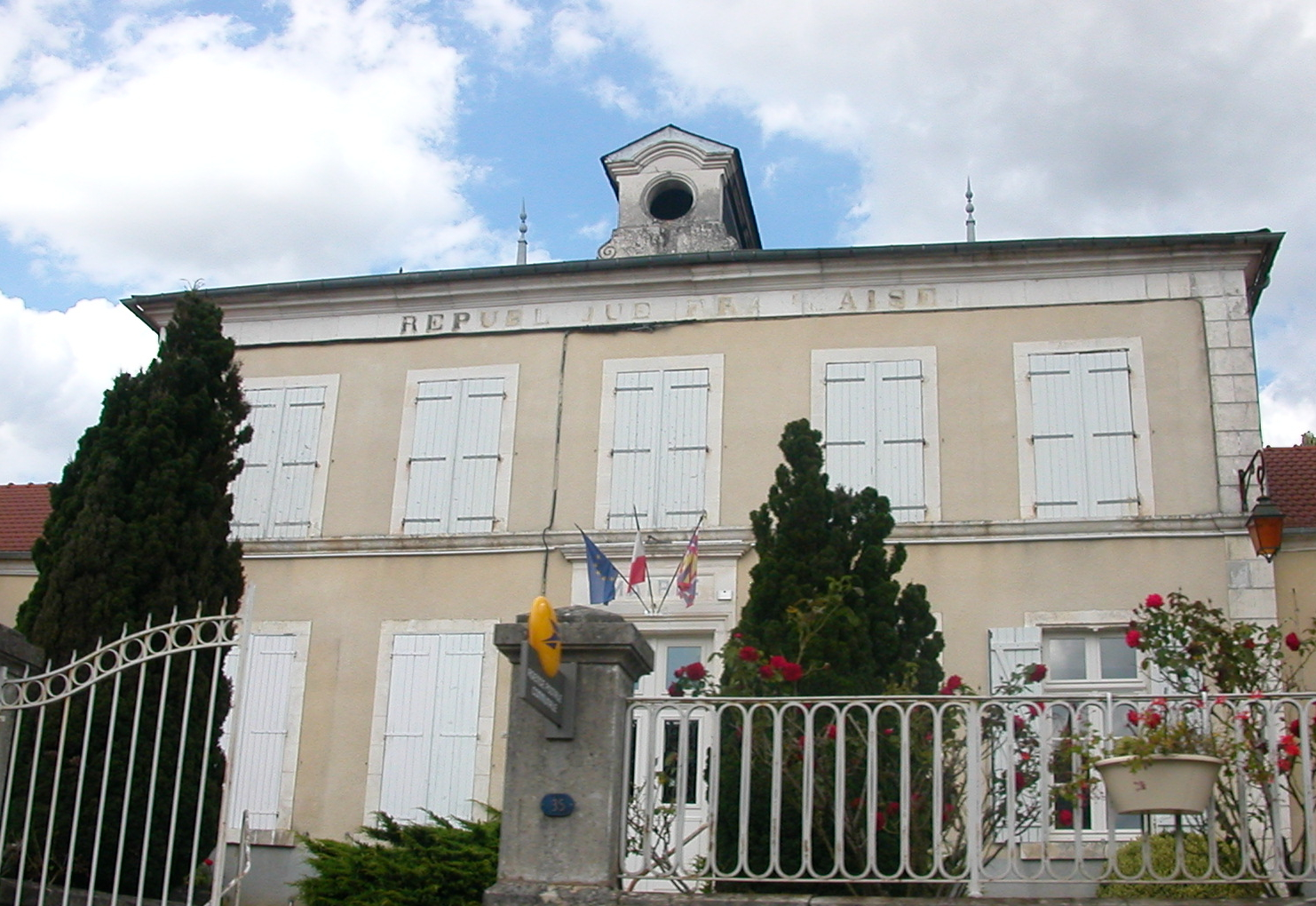
- Town hall

- Coat of arms
- Location of Arquian
- Location within France Location within Bourgogne-Franche-Comté
- Coordinates: 47°32′33″N 2°59′21″E
- Country: France
- Region: Bourgogne-Franche-Comté
- Department: Nièvre
- Arrondissement: Cosne-Cours-sur-Loire
- Canton: Pouilly-sur-Loire
- Intercommunality: CC Puisaye-Forterre

Government
  - Mayor (2020–2026): Cécile Becker
- Area^{1}: 33.56 km^{2} (12.96 sq mi)
- Highest elevation: 260 m (850 ft)
- Lowest elevation: 154 m (505 ft)
- Population (2023): 540
  - Density: 16/km^{2} (42/sq mi)
- Time zone: UTC+01:00 (CET)
  - Summer (DST): UTC+02:00 (CEST)
- INSEE/Postal code: 58012 /58310
- ^{1} French Land Register data, which excludes lakes, ponds, glaciers > 1 km^{2} (0.386 sq mi or 247 acres) and river estuaries.

Arquian (French pronunciation: [aʁkjɑ̃]) is a commune in the Nièvre department in central France, in the historical region of Puisaye.

== See also ==
- Communes of the Nièvre department
