= Châteauneuf-Val-de-Bargis =

- Commune
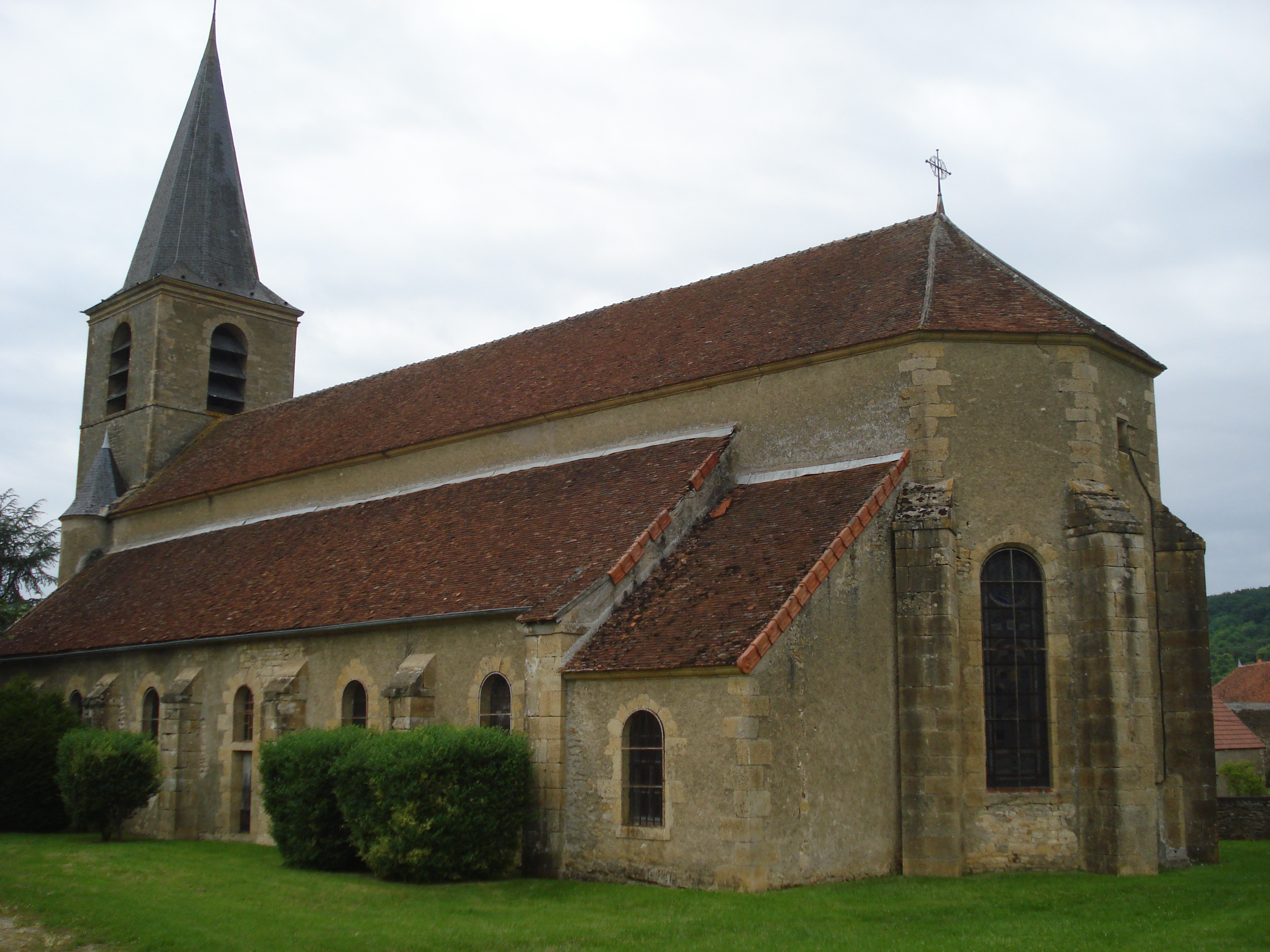
- The church in Châteauneuf-Val-de-Bargis
- Location of Châteauneuf-Val-de-Bargis
- Location within France Location within Bourgogne-Franche-Comté
- Coordinates: 47°17′03″N 3°13′38″E
- Country: France
- Region: Bourgogne-Franche-Comté
- Department: Nièvre
- Arrondissement: Cosne-Cours-sur-Loire
- Canton: Pouilly-sur-Loire

Government
  - Mayor (2020–2026): Patrick Rapeau
- Area^{1}: 47.56 km^{2} (18.36 sq mi)
- Highest elevation: 373 m (1,224 ft)
- Lowest elevation: 211 m (692 ft)
- Population (2023): 499
  - Density: 10.5/km^{2} (27.2/sq mi)
- Time zone: UTC+01:00 (CET)
  - Summer (DST): UTC+02:00 (CEST)
- INSEE/Postal code: 58064 /58350
- ^{1} French Land Register data, which excludes lakes, ponds, glaciers > 1 km^{2} (0.386 sq mi or 247 acres) and river estuaries.

Châteauneuf-Val-de-Bargis (French pronunciation: [ʃɑtonœf val də baʁʒi]) is a commune in the Nièvre department in central France.

== Demographics ==
On 1 January 2021, the estimated population was 484.

== See also ==
- Communes of the Nièvre department
- Mancini family
