= Cessy-les-Bois =

- Commune
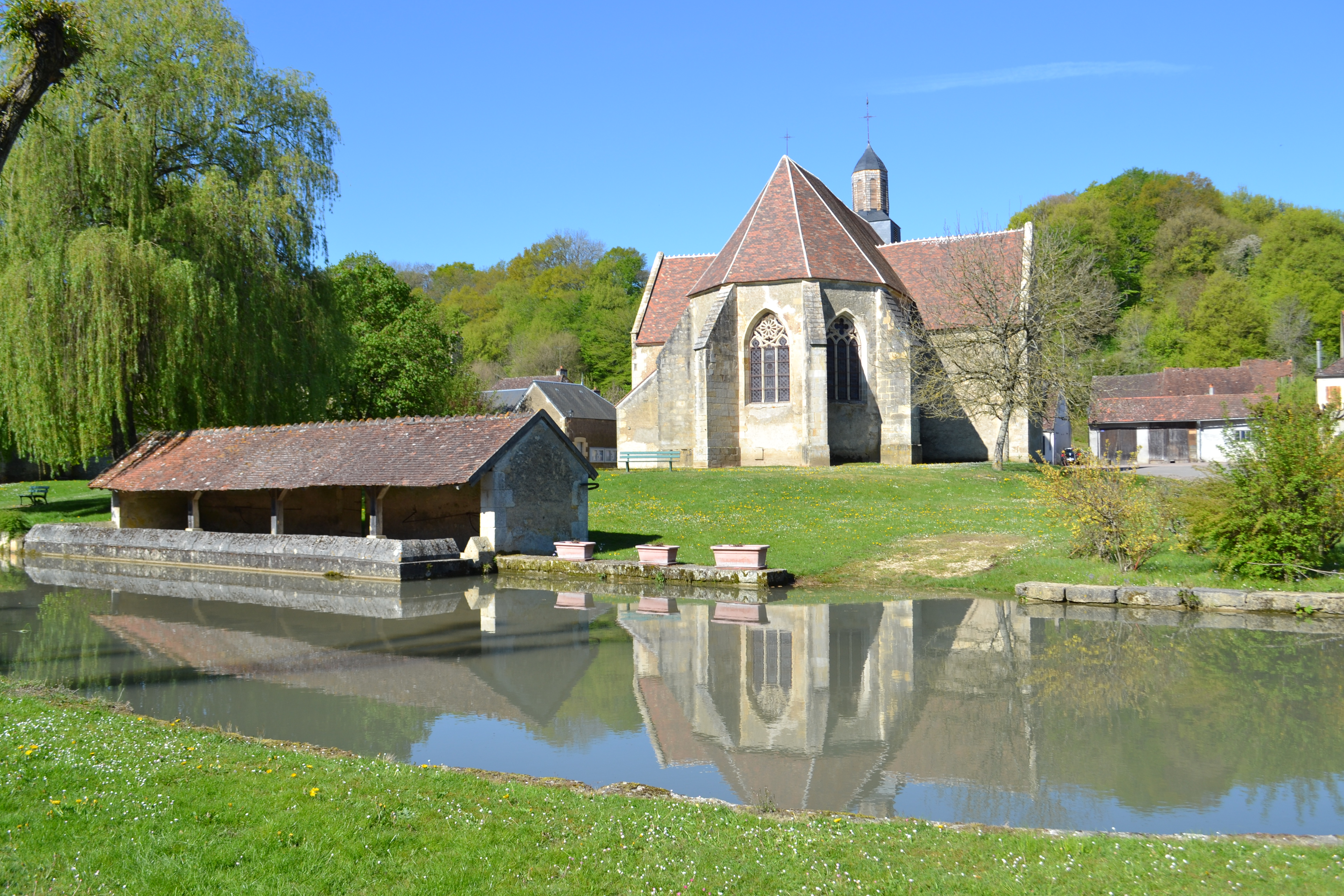
- The church in Cessy-les-Bois
- Location of Cessy-les-Bois
- Location within France Location within Bourgogne-Franche-Comté
- Coordinates: 47°20′13″N 3°12′23″E
- Country: France
- Region: Bourgogne-Franche-Comté
- Department: Nièvre
- Arrondissement: Cosne-Cours-sur-Loire
- Canton: Pouilly-sur-Loire

Government
  - Mayor (2020–2026): Sandra Tixier-Maudry
- Area^{1}: 17.49 km^{2} (6.75 sq mi)
- Highest elevation: 355 m (1,165 ft)
- Lowest elevation: 201 m (659 ft)
- Population (2023): 115
  - Density: 6.58/km^{2} (17.0/sq mi)
- Time zone: UTC+01:00 (CET)
  - Summer (DST): UTC+02:00 (CEST)
- INSEE/Postal code: 58048 /58220
- ^{1} French Land Register data, which excludes lakes, ponds, glaciers > 1 km^{2} (0.386 sq mi or 247 acres) and river estuaries.

Cessy-les-Bois (French pronunciation: [sɛsi le bwa]) is a commune in the Nièvre department in central France.

== Demographics ==
On 1 January 2021, the estimated population was 114.

== Hamlets ==
In addition to the village, Cessy-les-Bois includes several hamlets and isolated dwellings: Bondieuse, Chevenet, les Dubois, Montignon, Paray, la Redouterie.

== Local culture and heritage ==
=== Places and monuments ===
- Church of Saint-Christophe : built 1st half of the 16th century and 19th century; registered as historic monument on 29 March 1971. · .
- Priory: the exact location of the old monastery of Cessy remains to be determined. Two theories are opposed: according to one, the priory, destroyed in 1569, was located on the site of the current town hall; according to Abbot Charrault (abbé Charrault), local historian, it was located in Montignon, on a hillside.

=== Known people linked to the village ===
- Haimo of Auxerre, prior of Cessy from 865 to 875, theologian and exegete
- Roger de Bussy-Rabutin (1618-1693), philosopher and letter writer, pamphleteer, satirist, libertine, member of the French Academy and lord of Cessy.
- Poet and pamphleteer, Jacques Carpentier de Marigny (1615 / 1670), prior of Cessy-les-Bois, Coche, Saint-Malo-en-Donziois, Vielmanay.

== See also ==
- Communes of the Nièvre department
