= Menestreau =

- Commune
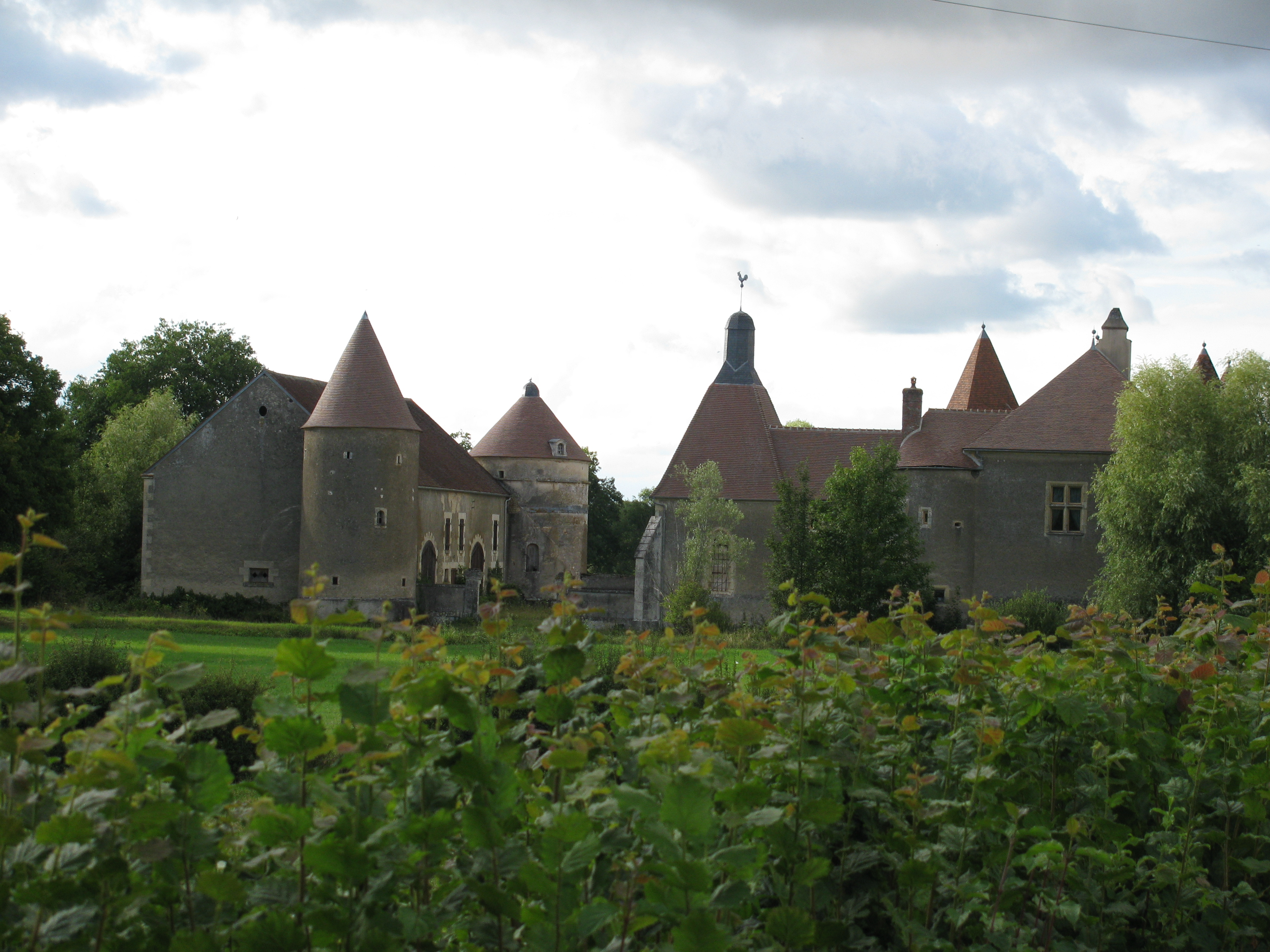
- The Château de Villiers, in Menestreau
- Location of Menestreau
- Location within France Location within Bourgogne-Franche-Comté
- Coordinates: 47°24′59″N 3°15′22″E
- Country: France
- Region: Bourgogne-Franche-Comté
- Department: Nièvre
- Arrondissement: Cosne-Cours-sur-Loire
- Canton: Pouilly-sur-Loire

Government
  - Mayor (2020–2026): Jean-Claude Gillonnier
- Area^{1}: 19.49 km^{2} (7.53 sq mi)
- Highest elevation: 373 m (1,224 ft)
- Lowest elevation: 206 m (676 ft)
- Population (2023): 96
  - Density: 4.9/km^{2} (13/sq mi)
- Time zone: UTC+01:00 (CET)
  - Summer (DST): UTC+02:00 (CEST)
- INSEE/Postal code: 58162 /58410
- ^{1} French Land Register data, which excludes lakes, ponds, glaciers > 1 km^{2} (0.386 sq mi or 247 acres) and river estuaries.

Menestreau is a commune in the Nièvre department in central France.

== See also ==
- Communes of the Nièvre department
