= Bulcy =

- Commune
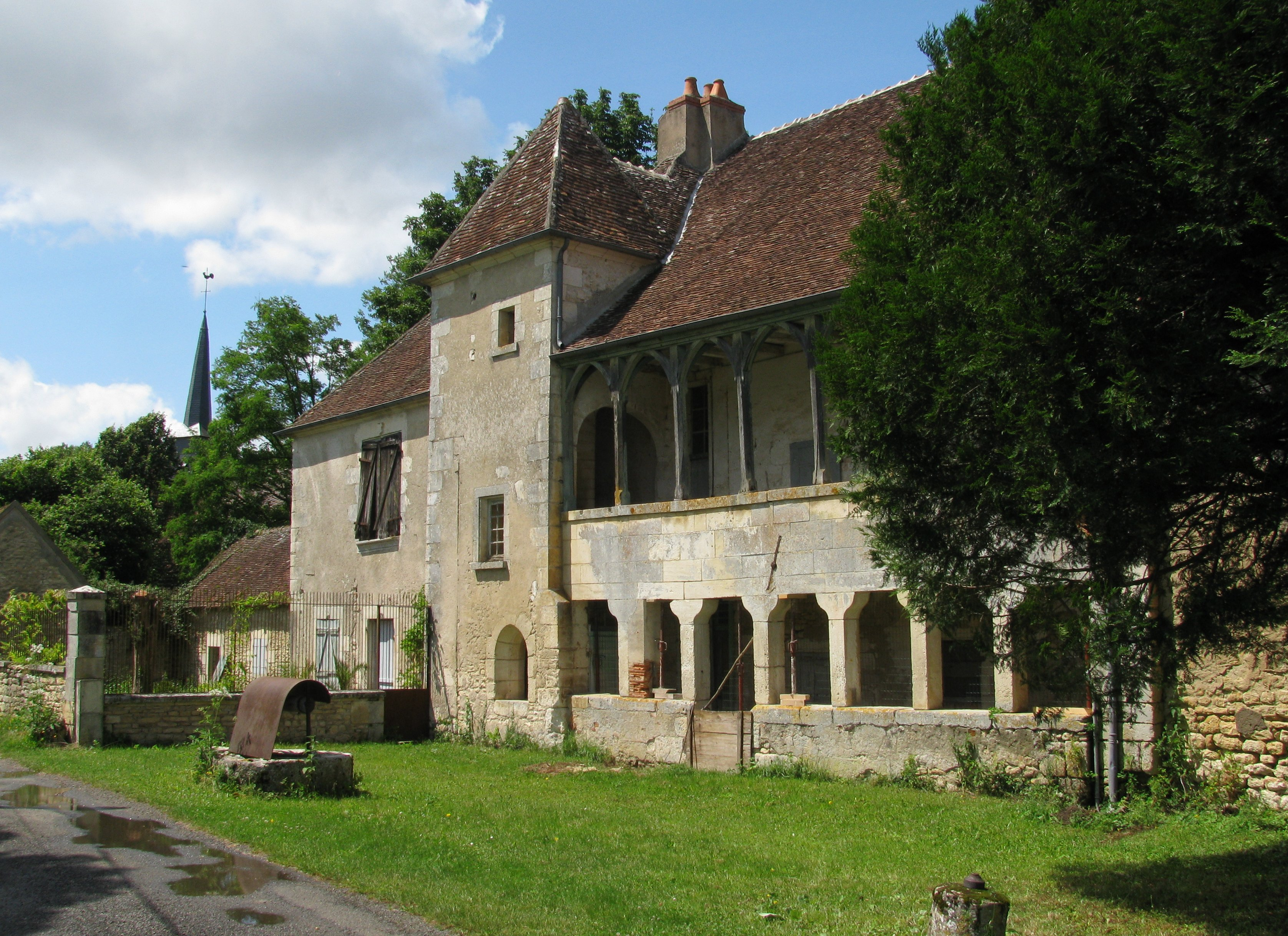
- The manor of Bulcy
- Location of Bulcy
- Location within France Location within Bourgogne-Franche-Comté
- Coordinates: 47°14′40″N 3°01′46″E
- Country: France
- Region: Bourgogne-Franche-Comté
- Department: Nièvre
- Arrondissement: Cosne-Cours-sur-Loire
- Canton: Pouilly-sur-Loire

Government
  - Mayor (2021–2026): Geneviève Paris
- Area^{1}: 8.43 km^{2} (3.25 sq mi)
- Highest elevation: 188 m (617 ft)
- Lowest elevation: 155 m (509 ft)
- Population (2023): 146
  - Density: 17.3/km^{2} (44.9/sq mi)
- Time zone: UTC+01:00 (CET)
  - Summer (DST): UTC+02:00 (CEST)
- INSEE/Postal code: 58042 /58400
- ^{1} French Land Register data, which excludes lakes, ponds, glaciers > 1 km^{2} (0.386 sq mi or 247 acres) and river estuaries.

Bulcy (French pronunciation: [bylsi]) is a commune in the Nièvre department in central France.

== History ==
In 1918, during World War I, a field between the towns of Mesves-sur-Loire and Bulcy was the site of a huge American Army hospital. In November, 1918, there were 20,186 patients and a total of 38,765 wounded and convalescing soldiers spent time at this temporary hospital. As many as 140,000 Americans were stationed in the area in 1918 so the it had a major American presence.

== Population ==
Historical population
Year	Pop.	±% p.a.
1968	237	—
1975	221	−0.99%
1982	192	−1.99%
1990	168	−1.66%
1999	138	−2.16%
2007	156	+1.54%
2012	142	−1.86%
2017	129	−1.90%
2023	146	+2.08%
Source: INSEE

== See also ==
- Communes of the Nièvre department
