= Nohain =

The Nohain is a river in central France. The name can also refer to the following people:

- Jean Nohain (1900–1981), French playwright, son of Franc-Nohain
- Dominique Nohain (1925–2017), French actor, son of Jean

== See also ==
- Franc-Nohain, pen name of French poet Maurice Étienne Legrand (1872–1934)
