= Couloutre =

- Commune
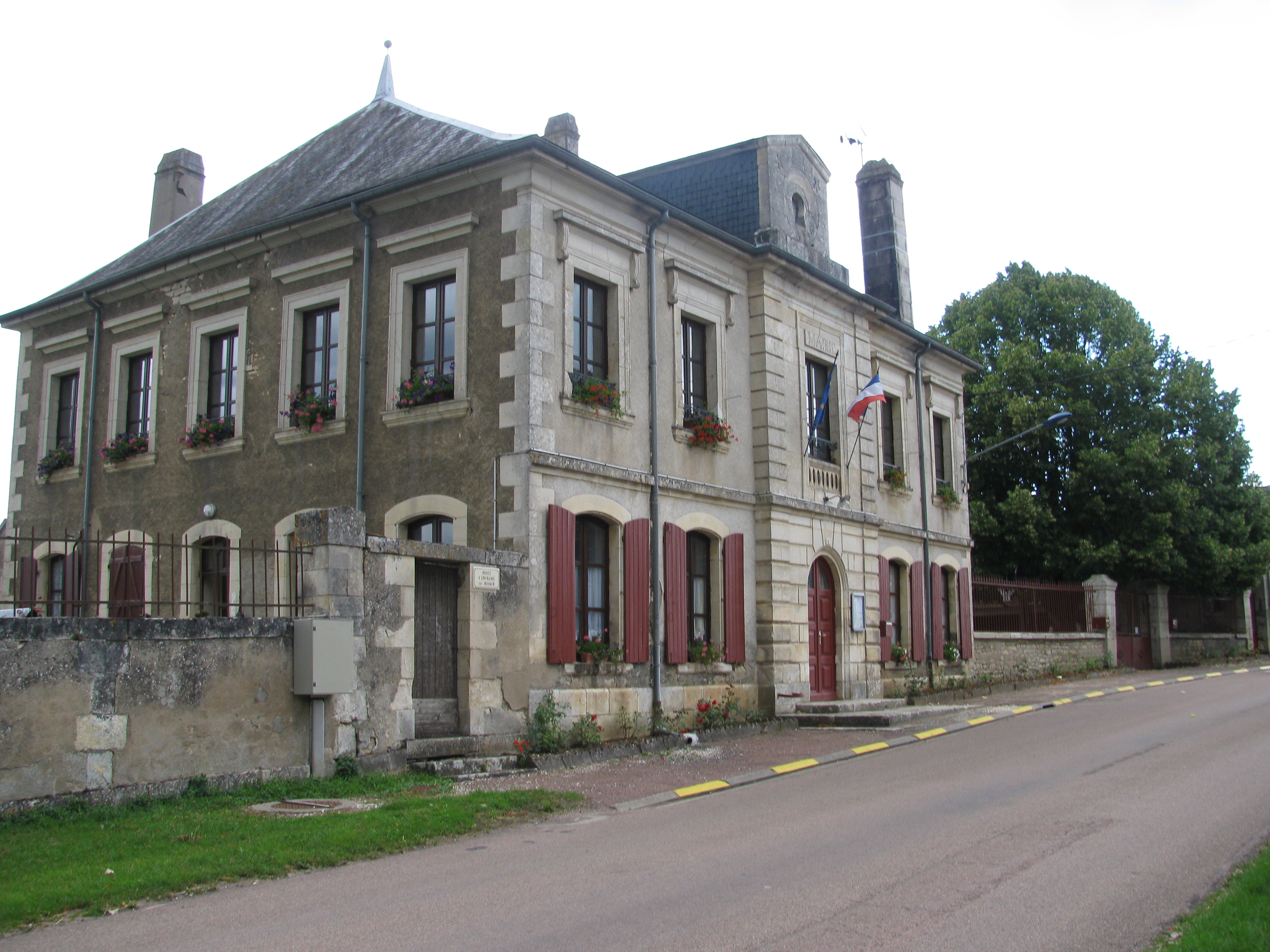
- The town hall in Couloutre

- Coat of arms
- Location of Couloutre
- Location within France Location within Bourgogne-Franche-Comté
- Coordinates: 47°24′33″N 3°13′35″E
- Country: France
- Region: Bourgogne-Franche-Comté
- Department: Nièvre
- Arrondissement: Cosne-Cours-sur-Loire
- Canton: Pouilly-sur-Loire

Government
  - Mayor (2020–2026): Mauricette Joseph
- Area^{1}: 21.03 km^{2} (8.12 sq mi)
- Highest elevation: 345 m (1,132 ft)
- Lowest elevation: 197 m (646 ft)
- Population (2023): 234
  - Density: 11.1/km^{2} (28.8/sq mi)
- Time zone: UTC+01:00 (CET)
  - Summer (DST): UTC+02:00 (CEST)
- INSEE/Postal code: 58089 /58220
- ^{1} French Land Register data, which excludes lakes, ponds, glaciers > 1 km^{2} (0.386 sq mi or 247 acres) and river estuaries.

Couloutre (French pronunciation: [kulutʁ]) is a commune in the Nièvre department in central France.

== See also ==
- Communes of the Nièvre department
