= Canton of Pouilly-sur-Loire =

Coordinates: 47.28°N 2.96°E

The canton of Pouilly-sur-Loire is an administrative division of the Nièvre department, central France. Its borders were modified at the French canton reorganisation which came into effect in March 2015. Its seat is in Pouilly-sur-Loire.

It consists of the following communes:

1. Annay
2. Arquian
3. Bitry
4. Bouhy
5. Bulcy
6. Cessy-les-Bois
7. Châteauneuf-Val-de-Bargis
8. Ciez
9. Colméry
10. Couloutre
11. Dampierre-sous-Bouhy
12. Donzy
13. Garchy
14. Menestreau
15. Mesves-sur-Loire
16. Neuvy-sur-Loire
17. Perroy
18. Pouilly-sur-Loire
19. Saint-Amand-en-Puisaye
20. Saint-Andelain
21. Sainte-Colombe-des-Bois
22. Saint-Laurent-l'Abbaye
23. Saint-Malo-en-Donziois
24. Saint-Martin-sur-Nohain
25. Saint-Quentin-sur-Nohain
26. Saint-Vérain
27. Suilly-la-Tour
28. Tracy-sur-Loire
29. Vielmanay
