= Ciez =

- Commune
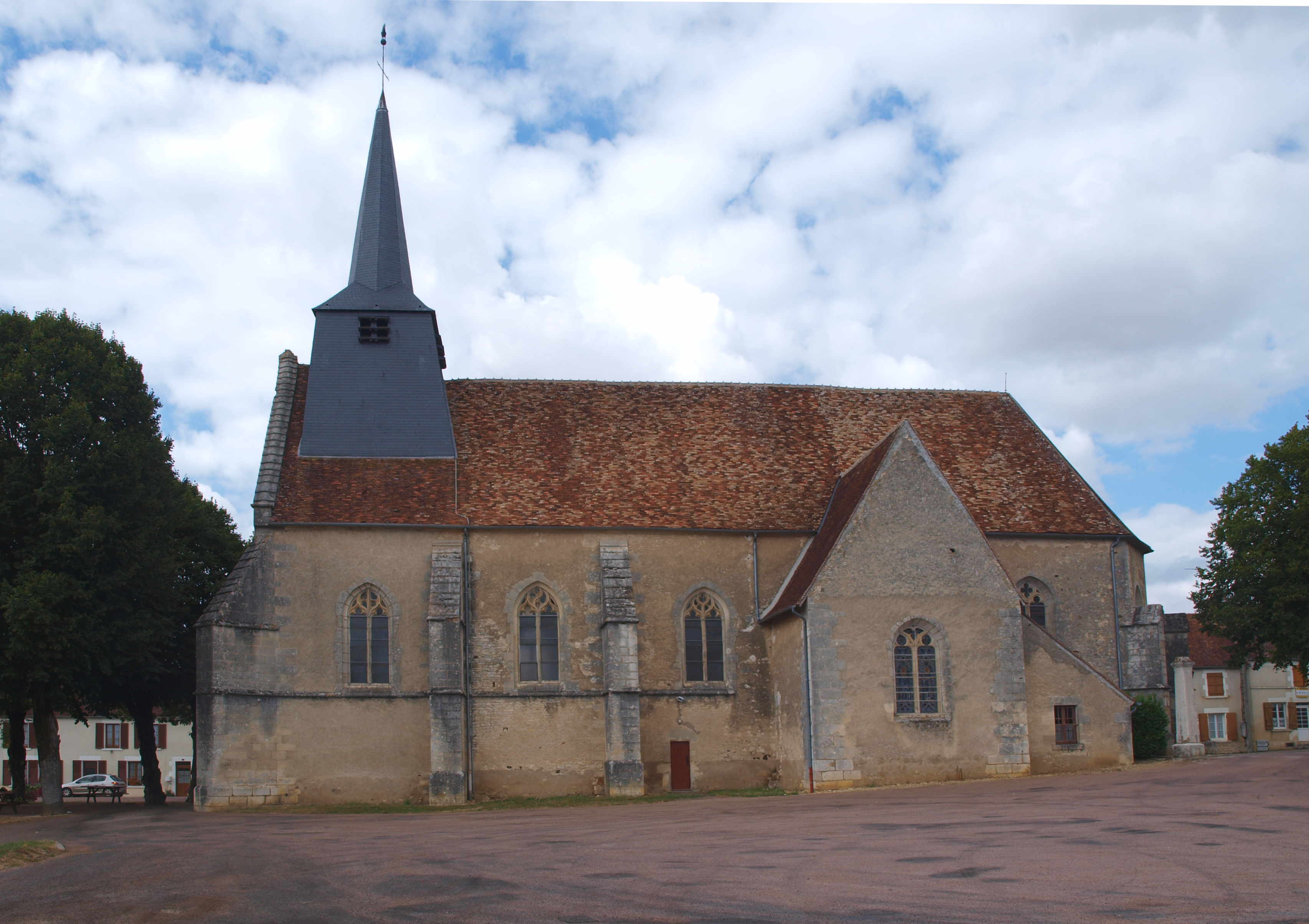
- The church in Ciez

- Coat of arms
- Location of Ciez
- Location within France Location within Bourgogne-Franche-Comté
- Coordinates: 47°26′32″N 3°09′47″E
- Country: France
- Region: Bourgogne-Franche-Comté
- Department: Nièvre
- Arrondissement: Cosne-Cours-sur-Loire
- Canton: Pouilly-sur-Loire

Government
  - Mayor (2020–2026): François Denizot
- Area^{1}: 28.34 km^{2} (10.94 sq mi)
- Highest elevation: 334 m (1,096 ft)
- Lowest elevation: 199 m (653 ft)
- Population (2023): 378
  - Density: 13.3/km^{2} (34.5/sq mi)
- Time zone: UTC+01:00 (CET)
  - Summer (DST): UTC+02:00 (CEST)
- INSEE/Postal code: 58077 /58220
- ^{1} French Land Register data, which excludes lakes, ponds, glaciers > 1 km^{2} (0.386 sq mi or 247 acres) and river estuaries.

Ciez (French pronunciation: [sje]) is a commune in the Nièvre department in central France.

== See also ==
- Communes of the Nièvre department
