= Cosne-Cours-sur-Loire =

- Subprefecture and commune
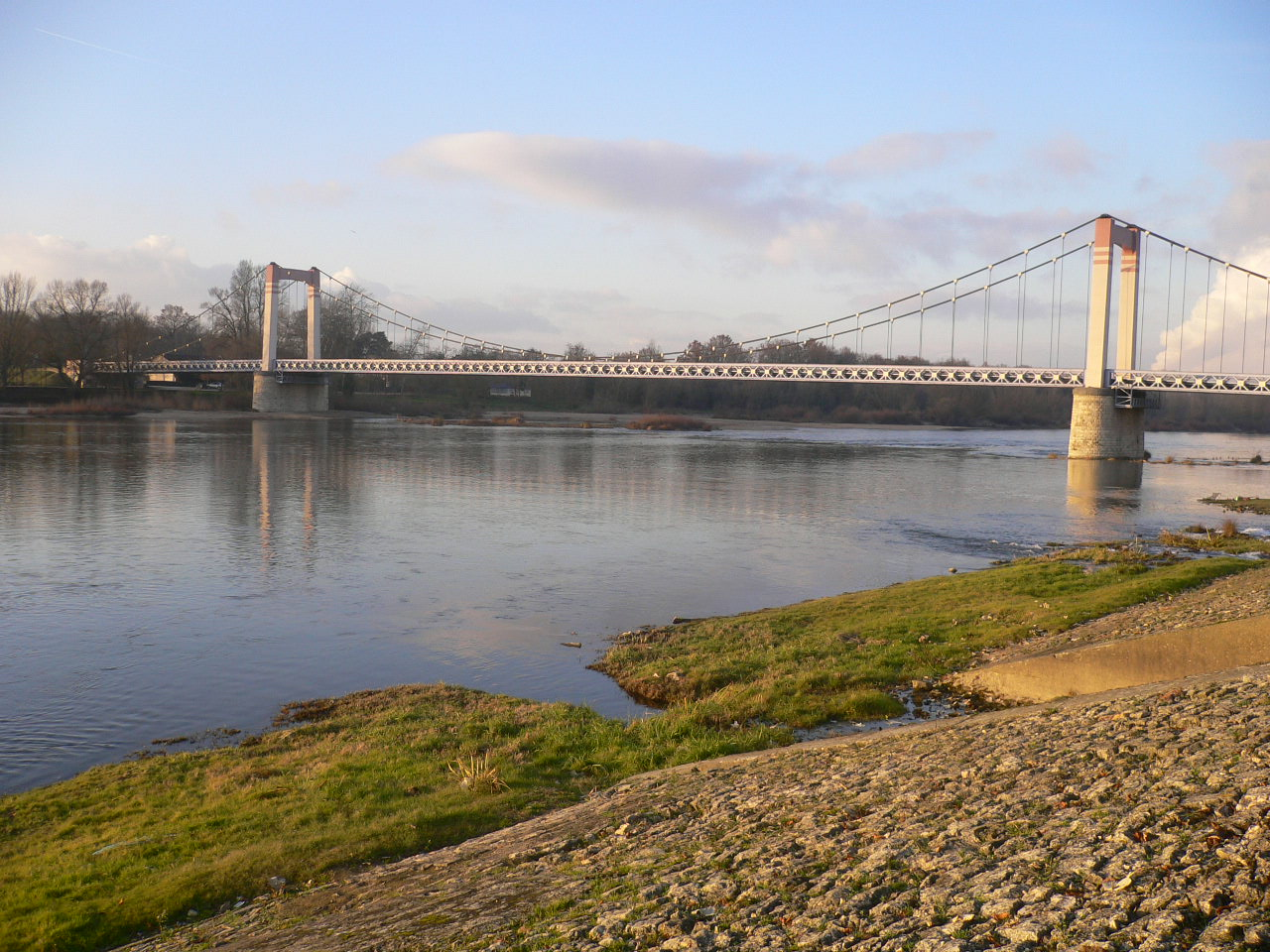
- Bridge over the river Loire in Cosne-Cours-sur-Loire

- Coat of arms
- Location of Cosne-Cours-sur-Loire
- Location within France Location within Bourgogne-Franche-Comté
- Coordinates: 47°24′44″N 2°55′39″E
- Country: France
- Region: Bourgogne-Franche-Comté
- Department: Nièvre
- Arrondissement: Cosne-Cours-sur-Loire
- Canton: Cosne-Cours-sur-Loire
- Intercommunality: Cœur de Loire

Government
  - Mayor (2020–2026): Daniel Gillonnier
- Area^{1}: 53.30 km^{2} (20.58 sq mi)
- Elevation: 148 m (486 ft)
- Highest elevation: 252 m (827 ft)
- Lowest elevation: 138 m (453 ft)
- Population (2023): 9,733
  - Density: 182.6/km^{2} (473.0/sq mi)
- Time zone: UTC+01:00 (CET)
  - Summer (DST): UTC+02:00 (CEST)
- INSEE/Postal code: 58086 /58200
- ^{1} French Land Register data, which excludes lakes, ponds, glaciers > 1 km^{2} (0.386 sq mi or 247 acres) and river estuaries.

Cosne-Cours-sur-Loire (French pronunciation: [kon kuʁ syʁ lwaʁ]) is a commune and a subprefecture of the Nièvre department in central France. It was created in 1973 by the merger of two former communes: Cosne-sur-Loire and Cours.

== Geography ==
Cosne-Cours-sur-Loire lies on the right bank of the Loire at its confluence with the Nohain, about 50 kilometres (31 mi) northwest of Nevers. Cosne-sur-Loire station has rail connections to Nevers, Montargis and Paris. The A77 autoroute (Montargis–Nevers) passes east of the town.

== History ==
Cosne is mentioned in the 3rd-century Antonine Itinerary under the name of Condate, but it was not until the Middle Ages that it rose into importance as a military post. In the 12th century the bishop of Auxerre and the Count of Nevers agreed to a division of the supremacy over the town and its territory.

== Demographics ==
Population data refer to the commune in its geography as of January 2025.

Historical population
Year	Pop.	±% p.a.
1968	10,588	—
1975	12,088	+1.91%
1982	12,463	+0.44%
1990	12,123	−0.35%
1999	11,399	−0.68%
2007	11,166	−0.26%
2012	10,551	−1.13%
2017	9,874	−1.32%
2023	9,733	−0.24%
Source: INSEE

== Notable buildings ==
The church of St Aignan is a building of the 12th century, restored in the 16th and 18th centuries. The only portions in the Romanesque style are the apse and the north-west portal. It formerly belonged to a Benedictine priory depending on the abbey of La Charité.

== Notable residents ==
- Roger Marie Bricoux, cellist on the RMS Titanic
- Sophie Adenot, Astronaut

== International relations ==
Cosne-Cours-sur-Loire is twinned with:

- Bad Ems, Germany
- Harpenden, United Kingdom
- Herentals, Belgium

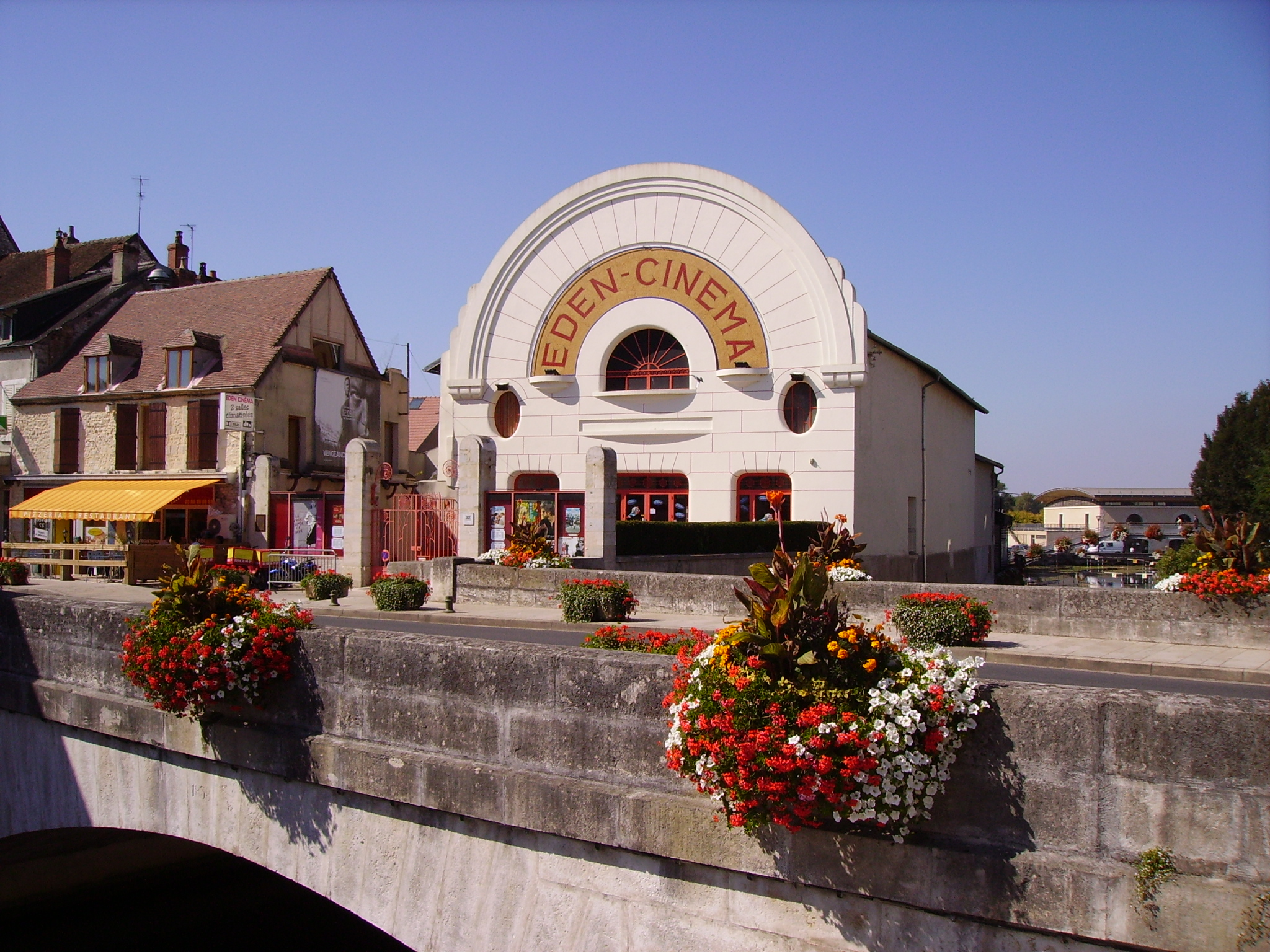
Éden cinema in Cosne-Cours-sur-Loire town centre.

== See also ==
- Communes of the Nièvre department
