= Perroy, Nièvre =

Perroy
- Commune
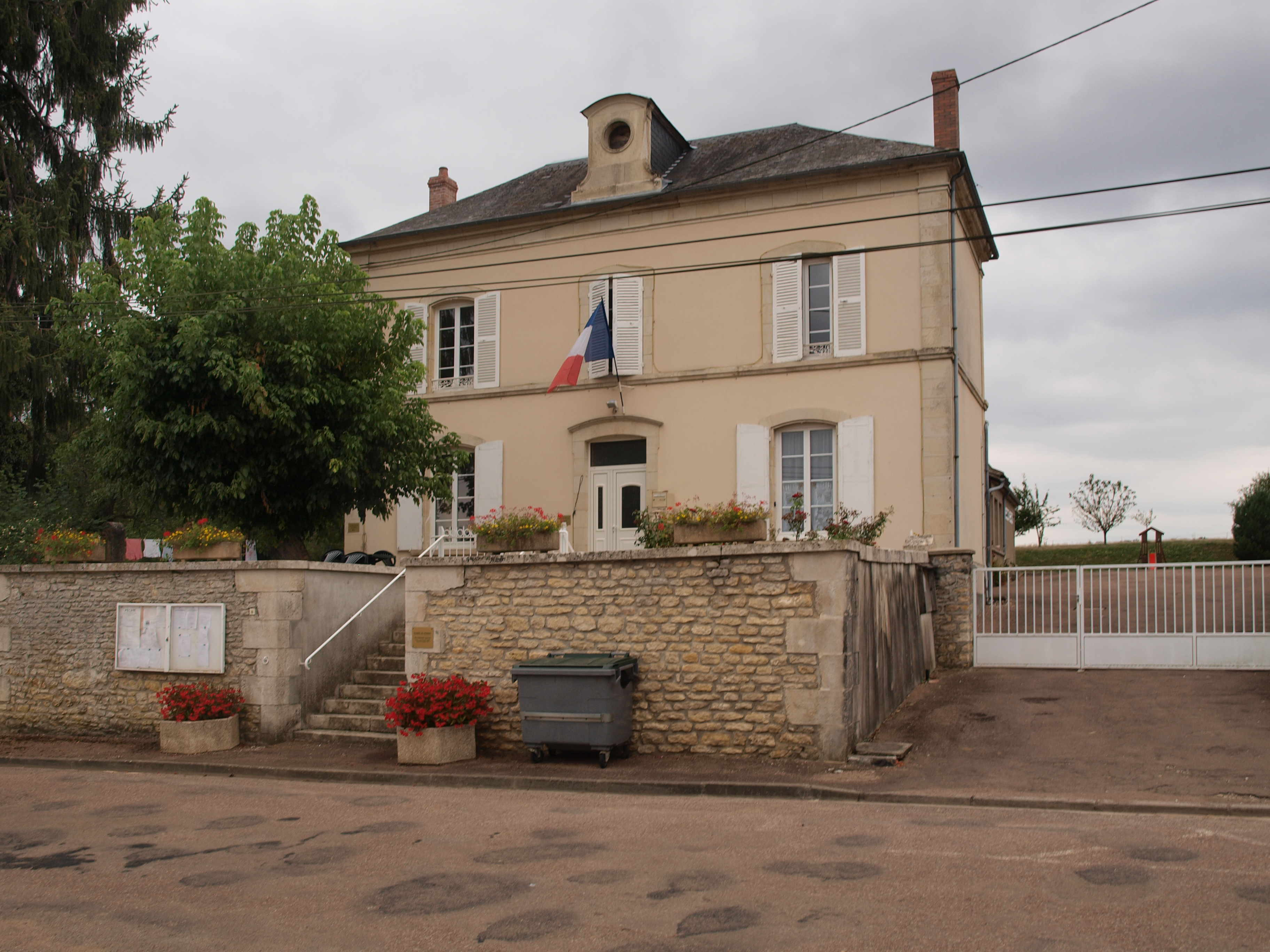
- The town hall in Perroy
- Location of Perroy
- Location within France Location within Bourgogne-Franche-Comté
- Coordinates: 47°23′58″N 3°09′41″E
- Country: France
- Region: Bourgogne-Franche-Comté
- Department: Nièvre
- Arrondissement: Cosne-Cours-sur-Loire
- Canton: Pouilly-sur-Loire

Government
  - Mayor (2020–2026): Bertrand Flandin
- Area^{1}: 21.68 km^{2} (8.37 sq mi)
- Highest elevation: 258 m (846 ft)
- Lowest elevation: 187 m (614 ft)
- Population (2023): 152
  - Density: 7.01/km^{2} (18.2/sq mi)
- Time zone: UTC+01:00 (CET)
  - Summer (DST): UTC+02:00 (CEST)
- INSEE/Postal code: 58209 /58220
- ^{1} French Land Register data, which excludes lakes, ponds, glaciers > 1 km^{2} (0.386 sq mi or 247 acres) and river estuaries.

Perroy (French pronunciation: [pɛʁwa]) is a commune in the Nièvre department in central France.

== See also ==
- Communes of the Nièvre department
