= Nohain (river) =

River in France

Coordinates: 47°24′38″N 2°55′17″E

The Nohain is a river in the Nièvre département in central France. It is 47.3 kilometres (29.4 mi) long.

The river's basin occupies the northern part of the Nièvre département. It is fed throughout its course by several springs and several tributaries. It is subdivided into many arms, giving the impression of meandering through its own valley.

The Nohain empties into the Loire at Cosne-Cours-sur-Loire.
