= Vielmanay =

- Commune
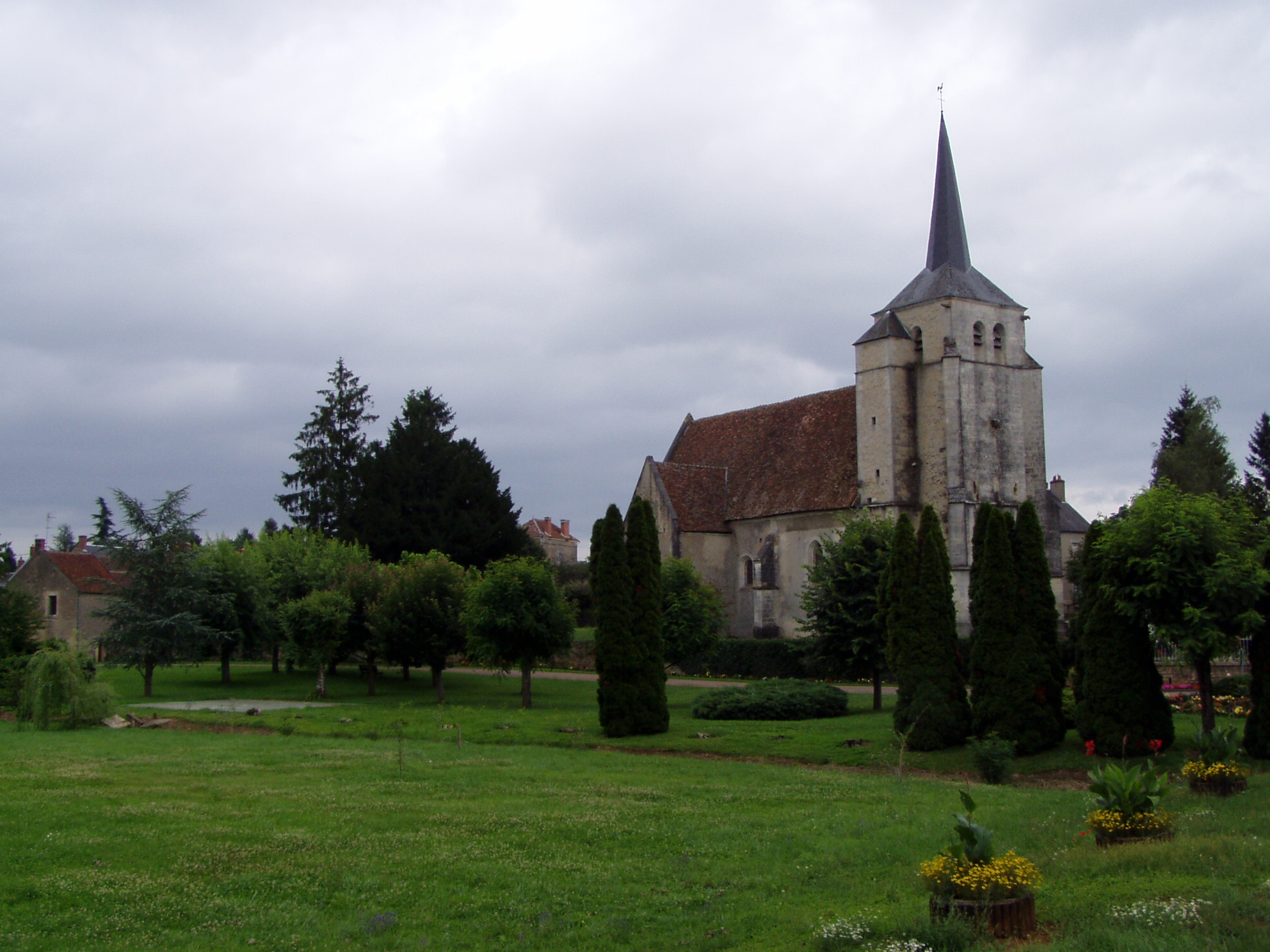
- The church in Vielmanay
- Location of Vielmanay
- Location within France Location within Bourgogne-Franche-Comté
- Coordinates: 47°16′03″N 3°06′55″E
- Country: France
- Region: Bourgogne-Franche-Comté
- Department: Nièvre
- Arrondissement: Cosne-Cours-sur-Loire
- Canton: Pouilly-sur-Loire
- Intercommunality: Cœur de Loire

Government
  - Mayor (2020–2026): Jean-Marc Baucino
- Area^{1}: 21.33 km^{2} (8.24 sq mi)
- Highest elevation: 247 m (810 ft)
- Lowest elevation: 172 m (564 ft)
- Population (2023): 173
  - Density: 8.11/km^{2} (21.0/sq mi)
- Time zone: UTC+01:00 (CET)
  - Summer (DST): UTC+02:00 (CEST)
- INSEE/Postal code: 58307 /58150
- ^{1} French Land Register data, which excludes lakes, ponds, glaciers > 1 km^{2} (0.386 sq mi or 247 acres) and river estuaries.

Vielmanay (French pronunciation: [vjɛlmanɛ]) is a commune in the Nièvre department in central France.

== See also ==
- Communes of the Nièvre department
