= Sainte-Colombe-des-Bois =

- Commune
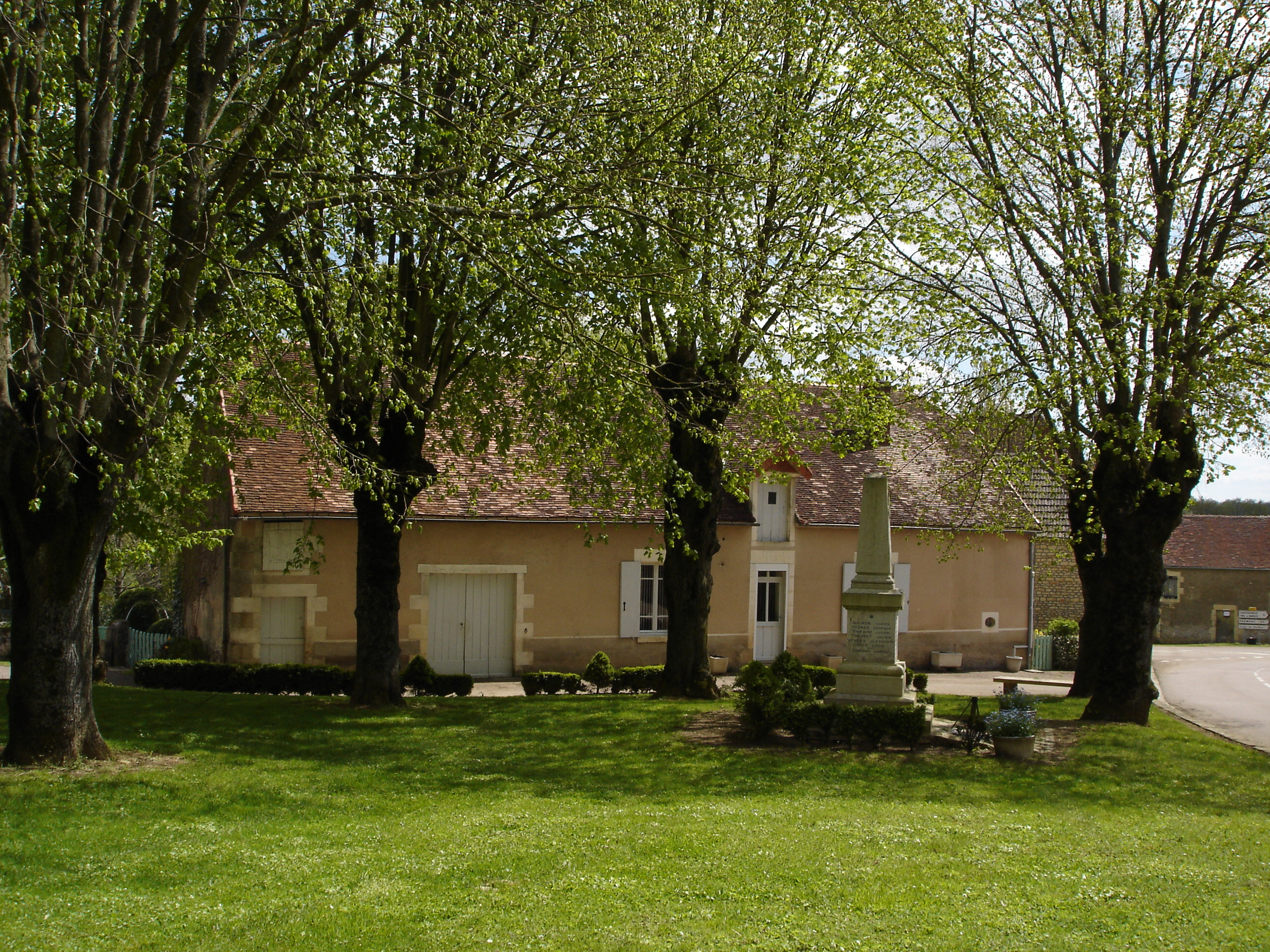
- Village square
- Location of Sainte-Colombe-des-Bois
- Location within France Location within Bourgogne-Franche-Comté
- Coordinates: 47°19′22″N 3°08′32″E
- Country: France
- Region: Bourgogne-Franche-Comté
- Department: Nièvre
- Arrondissement: Cosne-Cours-sur-Loire
- Canton: Pouilly-sur-Loire

Government
  - Mayor (2020–2026): Frédéric Aucouturier
- Area^{1}: 29.59 km^{2} (11.42 sq mi)
- Highest elevation: 352 m (1,155 ft)
- Lowest elevation: 187 m (614 ft)
- Population (2023): 140
  - Density: 4.7/km^{2} (12/sq mi)
- Time zone: UTC+01:00 (CET)
  - Summer (DST): UTC+02:00 (CEST)
- INSEE/Postal code: 58236 /58220
- ^{1} French Land Register data, which excludes lakes, ponds, glaciers > 1 km^{2} (0.386 sq mi or 247 acres) and river estuaries.

Sainte-Colombe-des-Bois (French pronunciation: [sɛ̃t kɔlɔ̃b de bwa]) is a commune in the Nièvre department in central France.

== See also ==
- Communes of the Nièvre department
