= Saint-Quentin-sur-Nohain =

- Commune
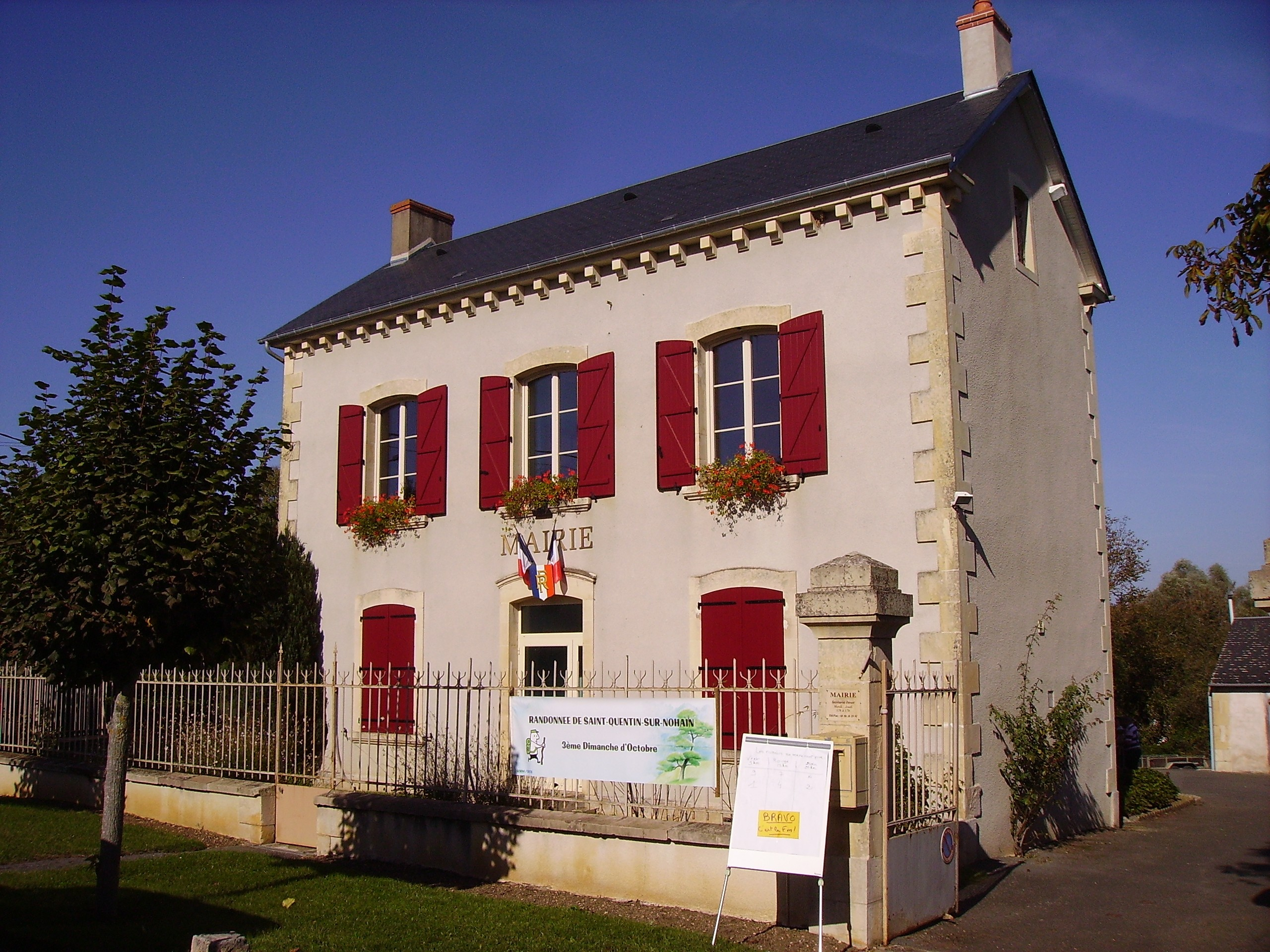
- The town hall in Saint-Quentin-sur-Nohain
- Location of Saint-Quentin-sur-Nohain
- Location within France Location within Bourgogne-Franche-Comté
- Coordinates: 47°20′54″N 3°01′26″E
- Country: France
- Region: Bourgogne-Franche-Comté
- Department: Nièvre
- Arrondissement: Cosne-Cours-sur-Loire
- Canton: Pouilly-sur-Loire
- Intercommunality: Cœur de Loire

Government
  - Mayor (2020–2026): Robert Chollet
- Area^{1}: 15.98 km^{2} (6.17 sq mi)
- Highest elevation: 202 m (663 ft)
- Lowest elevation: 156 m (512 ft)
- Population (2023): 101
  - Density: 6.32/km^{2} (16.4/sq mi)
- Time zone: UTC+01:00 (CET)
  - Summer (DST): UTC+02:00 (CEST)
- INSEE/Postal code: 58265 /58150
- ^{1} French Land Register data, which excludes lakes, ponds, glaciers > 1 km^{2} (0.386 sq mi or 247 acres) and river estuaries.

Saint-Quentin-sur-Nohain (French pronunciation: [sɛ̃ kɑ̃tɛ̃ syʁ nɔ.ɛ̃]) is a commune in the Nièvre department in central France.

== See also ==
- Communes of the Nièvre department
