= Saint-Andelain =

- Commune
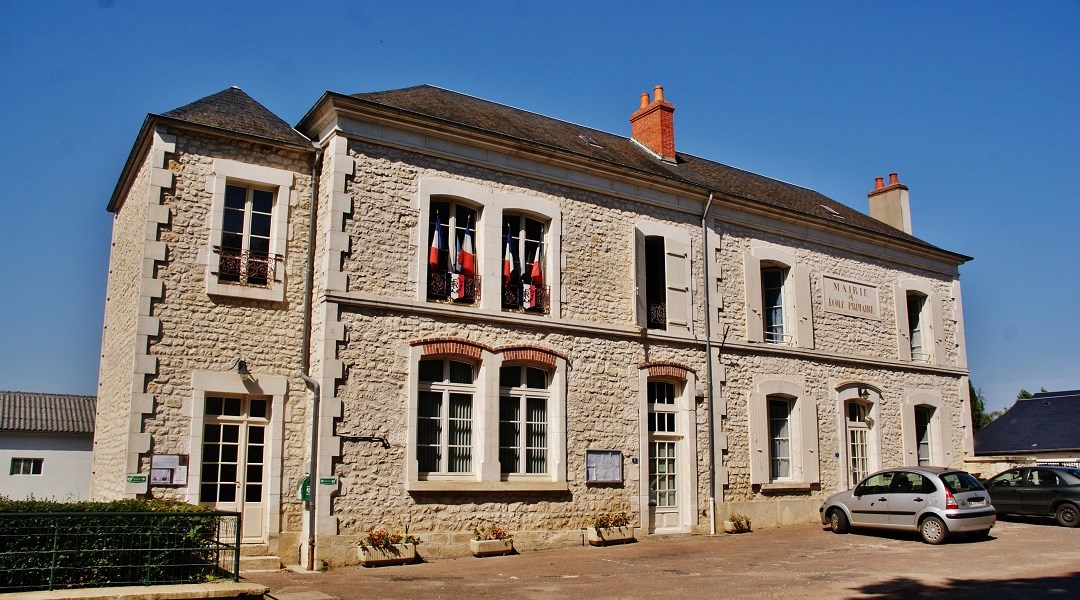
- The town hall in Saint-Andelain
- Location of Saint-Andelain
- Location within France Location within Bourgogne-Franche-Comté
- Coordinates: 47°18′33″N 2°57′41″E
- Country: France
- Region: Bourgogne-Franche-Comté
- Department: Nièvre
- Arrondissement: Cosne-Cours-sur-Loire
- Canton: Pouilly-sur-Loire
- Intercommunality: Cœur de Loire

Government
  - Mayor (2020–2026): Nathalie Liebard
- Area^{1}: 20.31 km^{2} (7.84 sq mi)
- Highest elevation: 271 m (889 ft)
- Lowest elevation: 164 m (538 ft)
- Population (2023): 583
  - Density: 28.7/km^{2} (74.3/sq mi)
- Time zone: UTC+01:00 (CET)
  - Summer (DST): UTC+02:00 (CEST)
- INSEE/Postal code: 58228 /58150
- ^{1} French Land Register data, which excludes lakes, ponds, glaciers > 1 km^{2} (0.386 sq mi or 247 acres) and river estuaries.

Saint-Andelain (French pronunciation: [sɛ̃.t‿ɑ̃dlɛ̃]) is a commune in the Nièvre department in central France.

It lies just a couple of km east of Pouilly-sur-Loire, famous for the wine known as Pouilly-Fumé. Saint-Andelain sits on a hilltop and is surrounded by vineyards that are part of the Pouilly-Fumé wine region. It is very picturesque when viewed from either the train running south from Paris to Nevers or from the new high-speed highway, A77.

== See also ==
- Communes of the Nièvre department
