= Annay, Nièvre =

Annay
- Commune
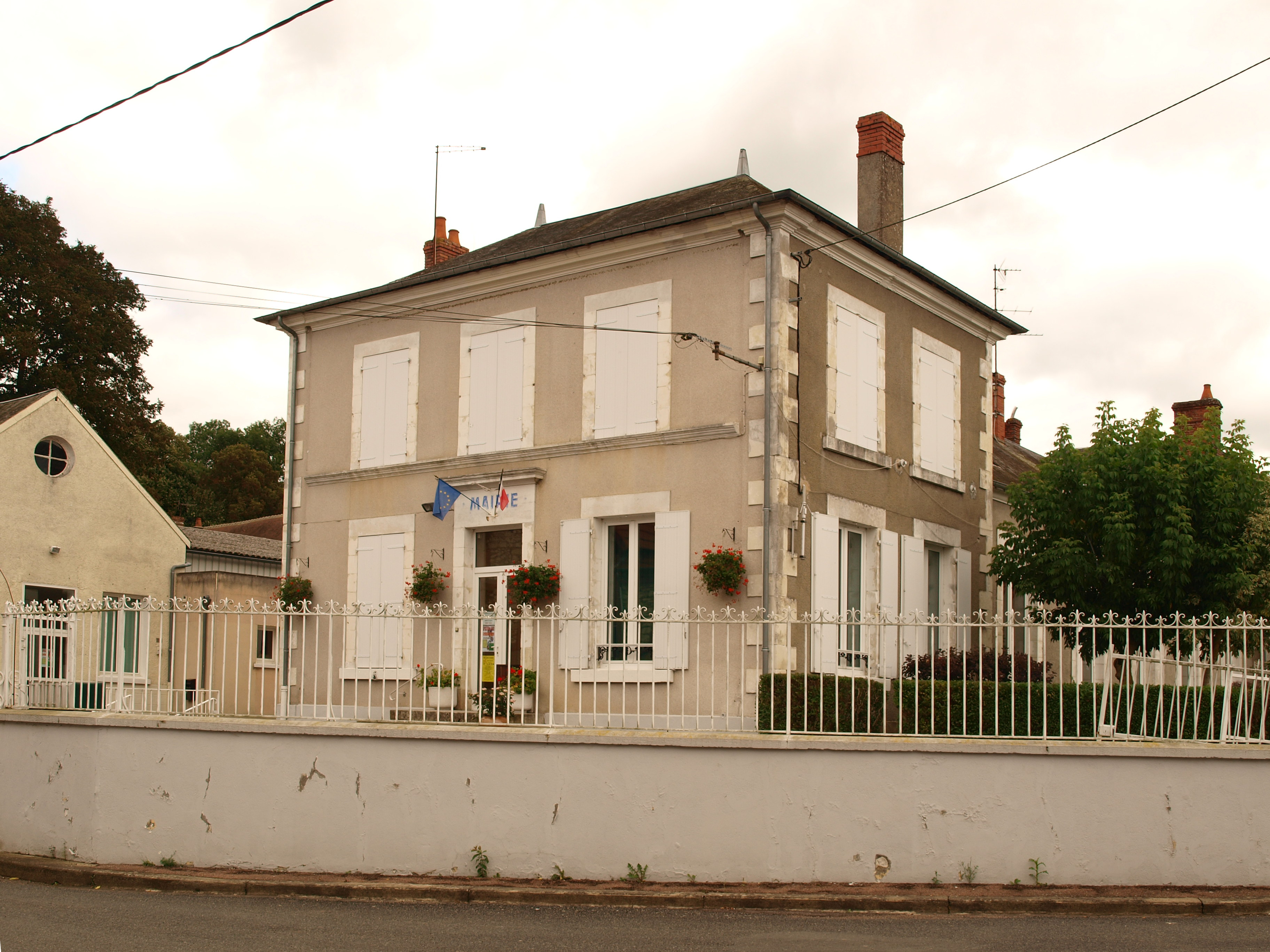
- The town hall in Annay

- Coat of arms
- Location of Annay
- Location within France Location within Bourgogne-Franche-Comté
- Coordinates: 47°32′12″N 2°56′01″E
- Country: France
- Region: Bourgogne-Franche-Comté
- Department: Nièvre
- Arrondissement: Cosne-Cours-sur-Loire
- Canton: Pouilly-sur-Loire

Government
  - Mayor (2023–2026): Véronique Ittah
- Area^{1}: 26.27 km^{2} (10.14 sq mi)
- Highest elevation: 238 m (781 ft)
- Lowest elevation: 142 m (466 ft)
- Population (2023): 343
  - Density: 13.1/km^{2} (33.8/sq mi)
- Time zone: UTC+01:00 (CET)
  - Summer (DST): UTC+02:00 (CEST)
- INSEE/Postal code: 58007 /58450
- ^{1} French Land Register data, which excludes lakes, ponds, glaciers > 1 km^{2} (0.386 sq mi or 247 acres) and river estuaries.

Annay (French pronunciation: [anɛ]) is a commune in the Nièvre department in central France.

== Population ==
Historical population
Year	Pop.	±% p.a.
1968	381	—
1975	355	−1.00%
1982	315	−1.69%
1990	279	−1.51%
1999	272	−0.28%
2007	305	+1.44%
2012	332	+1.71%
2017	339	+0.42%
2023	343	+0.20%
Source: INSEE

== See also ==
- Communes of the Nièvre department
