= Saint-Laurent-l'Abbaye =

- Commune
- Coat of arms
- Location of Saint-Laurent-l'Abbaye
- Location within France Location within Bourgogne-Franche-Comté
- Coordinates: 47°20′36″N 2°59′32″E
- Country: France
- Region: Bourgogne-Franche-Comté
- Department: Nièvre
- Arrondissement: Cosne-Cours-sur-Loire
- Canton: Pouilly-sur-Loire
- Intercommunality: Cœur de Loire

Government
  - Mayor (2024–2026): Jean Bertin
- Area^{1}: 1.41 km^{2} (0.54 sq mi)
- Highest elevation: 201 m (659 ft)
- Lowest elevation: 162 m (531 ft)
- Population (2023): 216
  - Density: 153/km^{2} (397/sq mi)
- Time zone: UTC+01:00 (CET)
  - Summer (DST): UTC+02:00 (CEST)
- INSEE/Postal code: 58248 /58150
- ^{1} French Land Register data, which excludes lakes, ponds, glaciers > 1 km^{2} (0.386 sq mi or 247 acres) and river estuaries.

Saint-Laurent-l'Abbaye (French pronunciation: [sɛ̃ loʁɑ̃ labei], before 2001: Saint-Laurent) is a commune in the Nièvre department in central France.

== See also ==
- Communes of the Nièvre department
