= Donzy =

- Commune
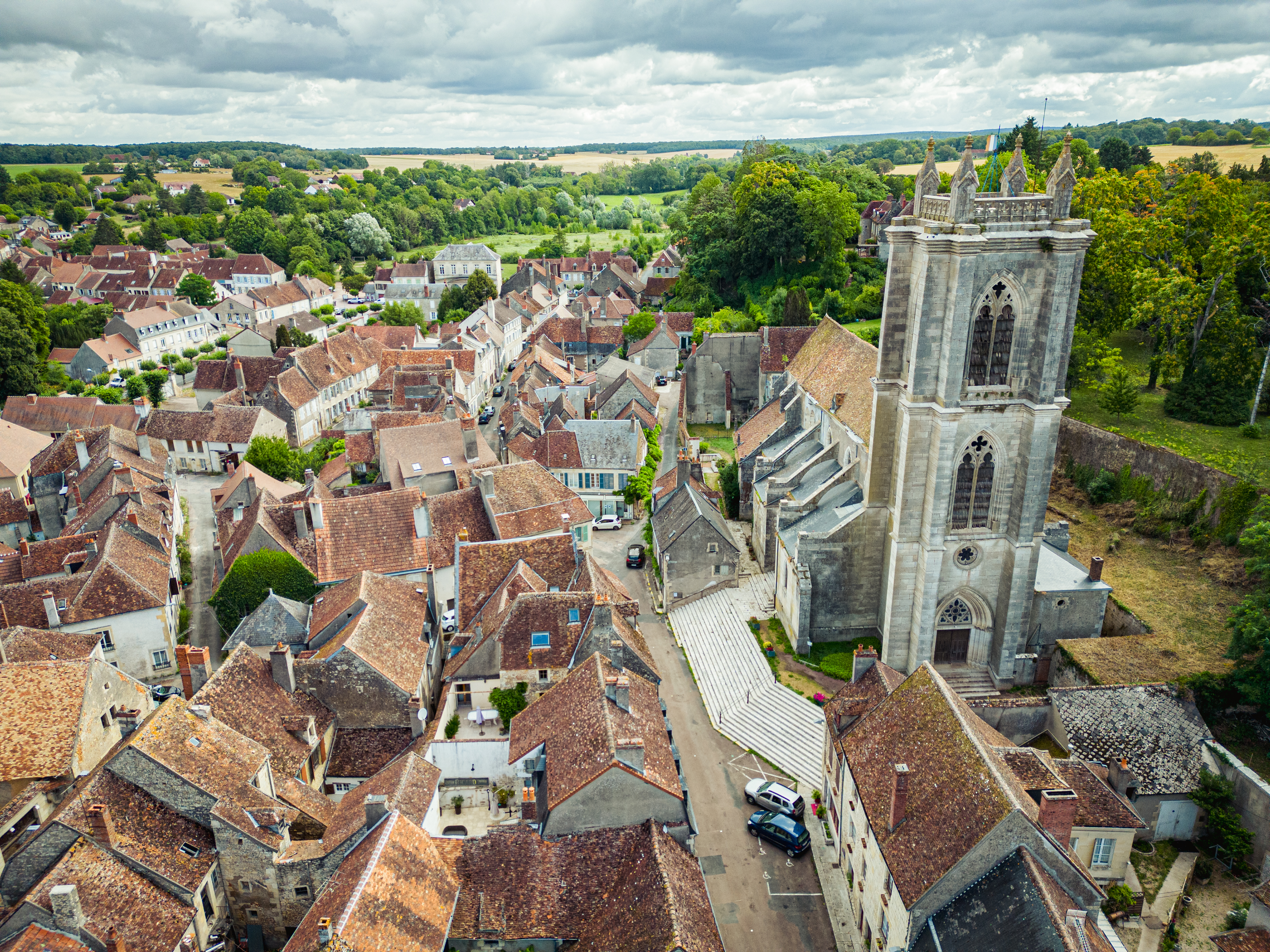
- The church in Donzy

- Coat of arms
- Location of Donzy
- Location within France Location within Bourgogne-Franche-Comté
- Coordinates: 47°22′18″N 3°07′29″E
- Country: France
- Region: Bourgogne-Franche-Comté
- Department: Nièvre
- Arrondissement: Cosne-Cours-sur-Loire
- Canton: Pouilly-sur-Loire
- Intercommunality: Villes de Coeur-de-Loire

Government
  - Mayor (2020–2026): Marie-France Lurier
- Area^{1}: 63.18 km^{2} (24.39 sq mi)
- Elevation: 48 m (157 ft)
- Highest elevation: 273 m (896 ft)
- Lowest elevation: 160 m (520 ft)
- Population (2023): 1,525
  - Density: 24.14/km^{2} (62.52/sq mi)
- Demonym: donziais
- Time zone: UTC+01:00 (CET)
  - Summer (DST): UTC+02:00 (CEST)
- INSEE/Postal code: 58102 /58220
- Website: http://www.donzy.fr
- ^{1} French Land Register data, which excludes lakes, ponds, glaciers > 1 km^{2} (0.386 sq mi or 247 acres) and river estuaries.

Donzy is a commune in the Nièvre department in central France. It is notable for having mirrored the national voting pattern at every election since 1981. In the Middle Ages it constituted the Barony of Donzy.

== Demographics ==
Historical population
| Year | Pop. | ±% p.a. |
|---|---|---|
| 1968 | 1,898 | — |
| 1975 | 1,908 | +0.08% |
| 1982 | 1,890 | −0.14% |
| 1990 | 1,719 | −1.18% |
| 1999 | 1,659 | −0.39% |
| 2007 | 1,637 | −0.17% |
| 2012 | 1,602 | −0.43% |
| 2017 | 1,583 | −0.24% |
| 2023 | 1,525 | −0.62% |
Source: INSEE

== History ==
=== Prehistory ===
Circular enclosures existed as early as the Iron Age in the Donzy area during the Hallstatt period: one at Les Chandeliers measuring almost 35 m in diameter, as well as a smaller one at Champ des Cabets, measuring 25 m in diameter. During the La Tène period, there were square enclosures for funerary use at Les Poiriers, near the Bois des Avis, three of them next to each other, two measuring 16 m and the third measuring 10 m with a path to the east and pits. Another is located near Crézan and is 22 m square with an ovoid structure and a smaller one 8 m square in the neighbouring plot. Traces of pathways were found in the Bois de l'Eminence with quadrangular enclosures. Traces of quadrangular ditched enclosures of various sizes can be found, for example, at Blanc Gâteau, one with internal partitioning in the Prairie Saint-Jean, two other trapezoidal enclosures at Champ de la Fée and Les Chenevières, and others at Les Mauduits, La Chaume Martin, La Vallée Boulat, Les Chandeliers, Champ Roland, Les Terres de la Motte, Grand-Champ, La Georgerie and Les Terres de l'Entonnoir. One of them turns out to be interesting, with rounded corners and a rectangular shape, and with an entrance in the middle of the short side, to the north; it measures around 100 x 40 m, on the east bank of the Fontbout in the Champ de Gehenne. It is difficult to give an interpretation as they were not sounded.

=== Middle Ages ===
In 596, the regulations of Saint Aunaire, 18th bishop of Auxerre (572–605), included Donzy among the thirty main parishes of the diocese.

Donzy was the capital of a barony and one of the most important fiefs in Burgundy-Franche-Comté: see Hervé IV de Donzy and his successors, the counts of Nevers, Auxerre and Tonnerre. Donzy was united with the county of Nevers through the marriage of Baron Hervé IV to Mahaut de Courtenay, heiress to the counties of Nevers, Auxerre and Tonnerre. From then on, the counts and then dukes of Nevers or the Nivernais were barons of Donzy until the Revolution (the last being Louis-Jules Mancini).

During the Wars of Religion, the Canons Regular of the Order of Saint Augustin, officiating at Donzy church, wished to shelter the relics of Saint Caradeuc, patron saint of their church since 1180. They chose the church of Thury, whose prior-curates were also members of the Order of Saint Augustin, because the parish seemed to be far from the incursions of Calvinist bands. Alas, in 1587, a troop of "reîtres" on their way to join the army of Henri de Bourbon (the future Henri IV) on the Loire plundered and ransacked the parish and, having discovered the shrine of Saint Caradeuc, broke it and threw the relics it contained into the street.

However, several inhabitants of the parish collected them and gave them to the prior parish priest, who placed them in a safe place until better times. In 1612, Edmond Morin, priest-vicar of Thury, Gilles Chevau, tax prosecutor, Julien Imbault and Pierre Coulade swore that the bones they had collected were those of Saint Caradeuc and that the relics were placed in a new shrine by Sir Jean Hasard, canon regular of Saint-Martin de Nevers, in the presence of the faithful gathered in the parish church on 21 March 1612.In 1616, Donzy, which supported the party of Charles de Gonzague (Duke of Nevers and therefore a descendant and heir of the Donzy family) and Condé (whose father Henri had first married Marie de Clèves-Nevers) and which was defended by Pierre de Gayardon II,... Siege of Donzy by the King's troops commanded by Marshal de Montigny. These troops included the Bourg de Lespinasse regiment. The town suffered some damage.

22 August 1688: Mgr André Colbert, 102nd Bishop of Auxerre, had the relics of Saint Caradeuc transferred to the new gilded wooden shrine that he had requested, with verification of the certificate dated 21 March 1612 authenticating the said relics.

In 1764, the trade consisted of wood and iron. Donzy held five fairs a year, each lasting one day: 22 January, the day of Saint-Vincent; 25 June, 16 August, 28 October, the day of Saint-Simon and Saint-Jude, and 30 November, the day of Saint-André. Every Saturday, there was a market. The inhabitants are comfortable here, and many live in opulence.

=== 19th century ===
The church of Saint-Caradeuc was rebuilt between 1839 and 1842.

Under the Second Empire, Donzy was called Donzy-l'Impérial.

=== 20th century ===
During the First World War, 106 Donziais died and 15 during the Second World War.

== See also ==
- Communes of the Nièvre department
