= Saint-Martin-sur-Nohain =

- Commune
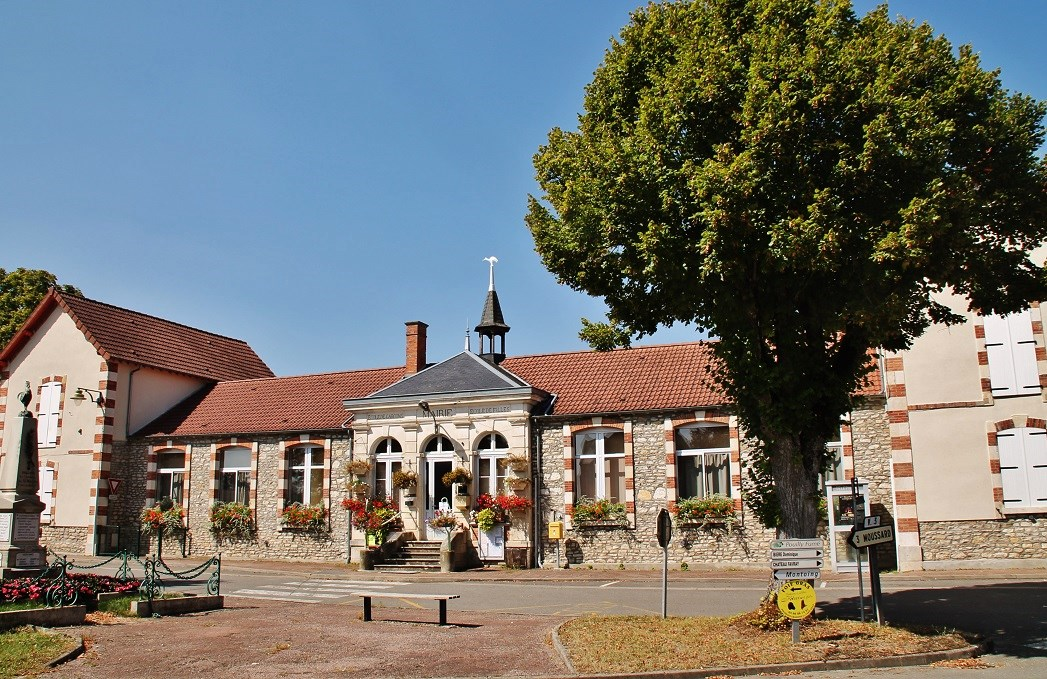
- Location of Saint-Martin-sur-Nohain
- Location within France Location within Bourgogne-Franche-Comté
- Coordinates: 47°21′47″N 2°59′05″E
- Country: France
- Region: Bourgogne-Franche-Comté
- Department: Nièvre
- Arrondissement: Cosne-Cours-sur-Loire
- Canton: Pouilly-sur-Loire

Government
  - Mayor (2020–2026): Nadège Coquillat
- Area^{1}: 24.03 km^{2} (9.28 sq mi)
- Highest elevation: 213 m (699 ft)
- Lowest elevation: 150 m (490 ft)
- Population (2023): 375
  - Density: 15.6/km^{2} (40.4/sq mi)
- Time zone: UTC+01:00 (CET)
  - Summer (DST): UTC+02:00 (CEST)
- INSEE/Postal code: 58256 /58150
- ^{1} French Land Register data, which excludes lakes, ponds, glaciers > 1 km^{2} (0.386 sq mi or 247 acres) and river estuaries.

Saint-Martin-sur-Nohain (French pronunciation: [sɛ̃ maʁtɛ̃ syʁ nɔ.ɛ̃]) is a commune in the Nièvre department in central France.

== See also ==
- Communes of the Nièvre department
