= Mesves-sur-Loire =

- Commune
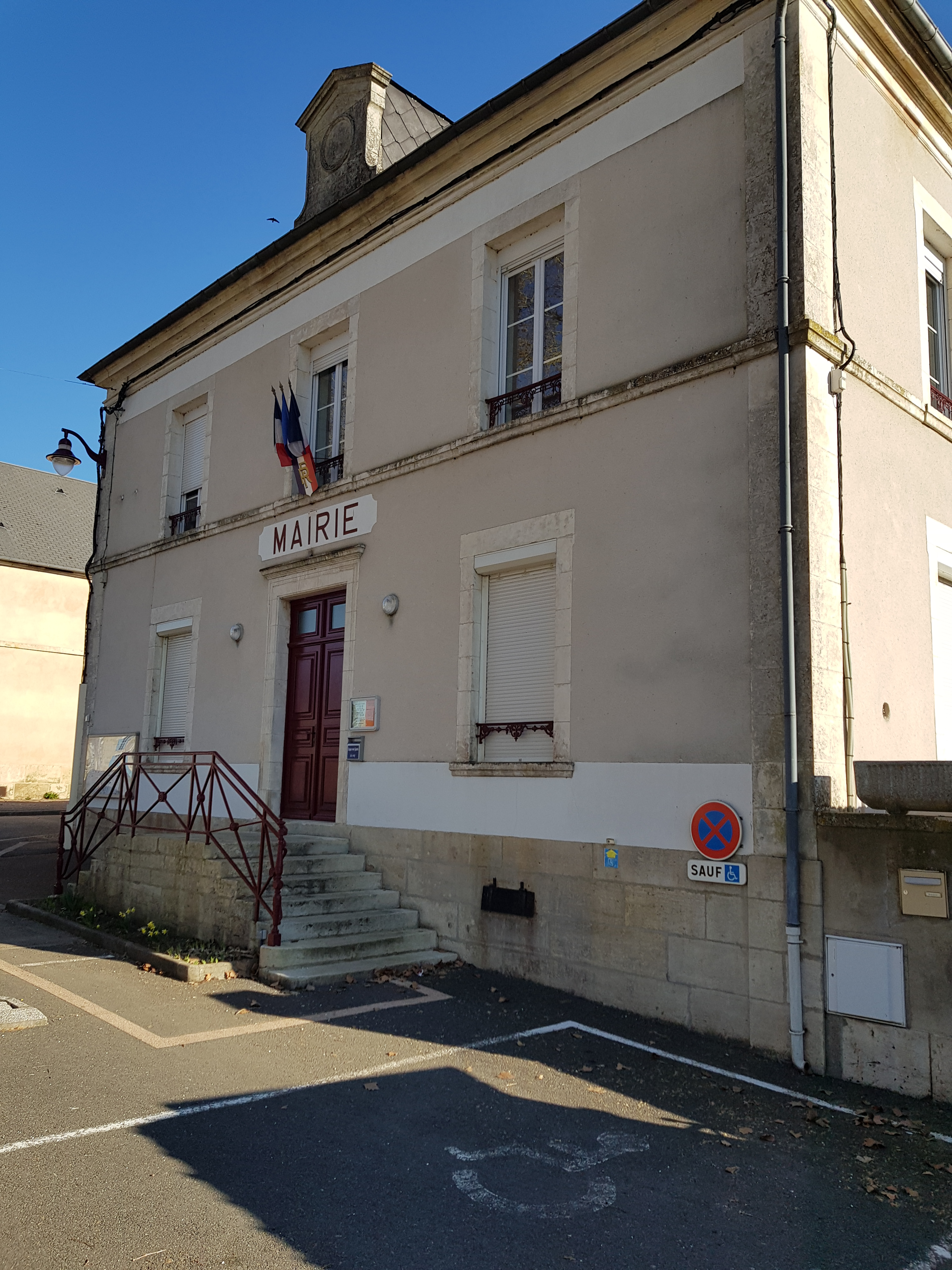
- The City Hall
- Location of Mesves-sur-Loire
- Location within France Location within Bourgogne-Franche-Comté
- Coordinates: 47°14′39″N 2°59′38″E
- Country: France
- Region: Bourgogne-Franche-Comté
- Department: Nièvre
- Arrondissement: Cosne-Cours-sur-Loire
- Canton: Pouilly-sur-Loire
- Intercommunality: Cœur de Loire

Government
  - Mayor (2020–2026): Bernard Gilot
- Area^{1}: 18.64 km^{2} (7.20 sq mi)
- Highest elevation: 188 m (617 ft)
- Lowest elevation: 148 m (486 ft)
- Population (2023): 662
  - Density: 35.5/km^{2} (92.0/sq mi)
- Time zone: UTC+01:00 (CET)
  - Summer (DST): UTC+02:00 (CEST)
- INSEE/Postal code: 58164 /58400
- ^{1} French Land Register data, which excludes lakes, ponds, glaciers > 1 km^{2} (0.386 sq mi or 247 acres) and river estuaries.

Mesves-sur-Loire (French pronunciation: [mɛv syʁ lwaʁ], literally Mesves on Loire) is a commune in the Nièvre department in central France.

== Geography ==
Mesves-sur-Loire is a farm town on the right bank of the river Loire, surrounded by grain fields to the east and vineyards to the north and south. The vineyards are within the Pouilly Fumé district, the famous wine town of Pouilly-sur-Loire being located just 5 km to the north. The general area is known as La Nièvre and lies within the larger region known as Bourgogne-Franche-Comté.

Mesves-Bulcy station has rail connections to Nevers and Cosne-sur-Loire. There is also a new highway, A77 autoroute, which parallels the rail line and runs to the outskirts of Paris. So, while Mesves is quiet, it is easily accessible from Paris.

== History ==
In 1918, during World War I, a field between the towns of Mesves-sur-Loire and Bulcy was the site of an American army hospital. The hospital was run by the U.S. Base Hospital No. 50 unit. The unit reached Mesves-sur-Loire on August 6, 1918. By November, 1918, there were 20,186 patients with a total of 38,765 wounded. Convalescing soldiers also spent time at this temporary hospital. As many as 140,000 Americans were stationed in the area in 1918. The hospital in Mesves-sur-Loire closed on January 20, 1919.

This site, close to the river Loire, was one of two large American Army hospitals during World War I (the other being in Mars-sur-Allier). It was selected because it was a safe distance from the battle lines in northeast France (Mesves-sur-Loire is about 200 km south of Paris); further, it is located on a major rail line to Paris, making it accessible.

When entering Bulcy, just 3 km to the east of Mesves, the street sign identifies the street name as rue du Camp-Américain. That is the only visible signage reminding one of the huge US Army hospital that served wounded service men during World War I. The field site of the hospital has since been restored, and are full of crops during the growing season.

== See also ==
- Communes of the Nièvre department
