= Garchy =

- Commune
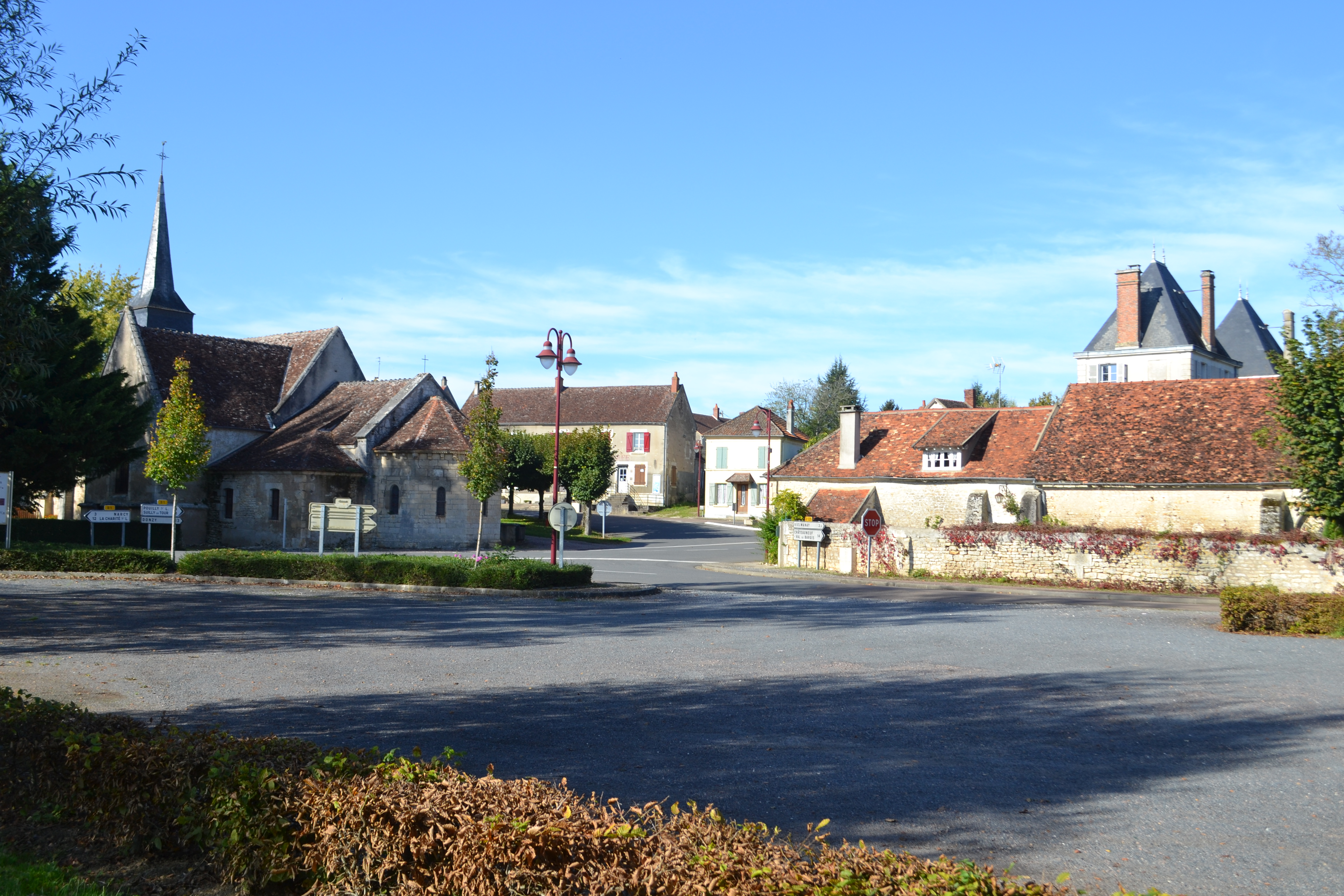
- A view within Garchy
- Location of Garchy
- Location within France Location within Bourgogne-Franche-Comté
- Coordinates: 47°15′51″N 3°04′19″E
- Country: France
- Region: Bourgogne-Franche-Comté
- Department: Nièvre
- Arrondissement: Cosne-Cours-sur-Loire
- Canton: Pouilly-sur-Loire
- Intercommunality: Cœur de Loire

Government
  - Mayor (2020–2026): Denis Houchot
- Area^{1}: 21.18 km^{2} (8.18 sq mi)
- Highest elevation: 198 m (650 ft)
- Lowest elevation: 158 m (518 ft)
- Population (2023): 424
  - Density: 20.0/km^{2} (51.8/sq mi)
- Time zone: UTC+01:00 (CET)
  - Summer (DST): UTC+02:00 (CEST)
- INSEE/Postal code: 58122 /58150
- ^{1} French Land Register data, which excludes lakes, ponds, glaciers > 1 km^{2} (0.386 sq mi or 247 acres) and river estuaries.

Garchy (French pronunciation: [ɡaʁʃi]) is a commune in the Nièvre department in central France.

== See also ==
- Communes of the Nièvre department
