= Pouilly-sur-Loire =

- Commune
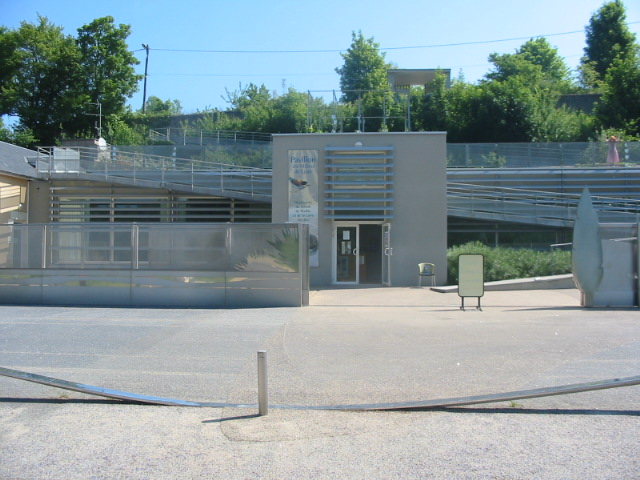
- The pavillon du milieu de Loire, in Pouilly-sur-Loire

- Coat of arms
- Location of Pouilly-sur-Loire
- Location within France Location within Bourgogne-Franche-Comté
- Coordinates: 47°17′01″N 2°57′30″E
- Country: France
- Region: Bourgogne-Franche-Comté
- Department: Nièvre
- Arrondissement: Cosne-Cours-sur-Loire
- Canton: Pouilly-sur-Loire

Government
  - Mayor (2020–2026): Pascal Knopp
- Area^{1}: 20.28 km^{2} (7.83 sq mi)
- Highest elevation: 244 m (801 ft)
- Lowest elevation: 143 m (469 ft)
- Population (2023): 1,635
  - Density: 80.62/km^{2} (208.8/sq mi)
- Time zone: UTC+01:00 (CET)
  - Summer (DST): UTC+02:00 (CEST)
- INSEE/Postal code: 58215 /58150
- ^{1} French Land Register data, which excludes lakes, ponds, glaciers > 1 km^{2} (0.386 sq mi or 247 acres) and river estuaries.

Pouilly-sur-Loire (French pronunciation: [puji syʁ lwaʁ], literally Pouilly on Loire) is a commune in Nièvre, a department in central France.

== See also ==
- Communes of the Nièvre department
