= Results of the 2024 French legislative election in Nièvre =

Following the first round of the 2024 French legislative election on 30 June 2024, runoff elections in each constituency where no candidate received a vote share greater than 50 percent were scheduled for 7 July. Candidates permitted to stand in the runoff elections needed to either come in first or second place in the first round or achieve more than 12.5 percent of the votes of the entire electorate (as opposed to 12.5 percent of the vote share due to low turnout).

== Nièvre ==
=== 1st constituency ===
Candidate	Party or alliance		First round		Second round	
Candidate	Party or alliance		Votes	%	Votes	%
Charles-Henri Gallois	National Rally		18,870	40.81	21,256	46.33
Perrine Goulet	Ensemble	Democratic Movement	13,593	29.40	24,627	53.67
Brice Larèpe	New Popular Front	La France Insoumise	9,856	21.32		
Baptiste Dubost	The Republicans		2,482	5.37		
Geneviève Lemoine	Far-left	Lutte Ouvrière	809	1.75		
Chantal Varela	Sovereigntist right	Debout la France	628	1.36		
Total			46,238	100.00	45,883	100.00
Valid votes			46,238	96.56	45,883	94.60
Invalid votes			432	0.90	585	1.21
Blank votes			1,217	2.54	2,034	4.19
Total votes			47,887	100.00	48,502	100.00
Registered voters/turnout			73,850	64.84	73,867	65.66

=== 2nd constituency ===
Candidate	Party or alliance		First round		Second round	
Candidate	Party or alliance		Votes	%	Votes	%
Julien Guibert	National Rally		23,481	44.83	27,522	54.82
Christian Paul	New Popular Front	Socialist Party	13,788	26.32	22,686	45.18
Sandra Germain	Ensemble	Renaissance	10,708	20.44		
Marc-Alexandre Vincent	The Republicans		2,757	5.26		
Dominique Dupuis	Far-left	Lutte Ouvrière	839	1.60		
Aurore Munoz	Sovereigntist right	Independent	801	1.53		
Justine Guyot	Miscellaneous left	Independent	9	0.02		
Total			52,383	100.00	50,208	100.00
Valid votes			52,383	96.55	50,208	91.12
Invalid votes			819	1.51	1,497	2.72
Blank votes			1,054	1.94	3,396	6.16
Total votes			54,256	100.00	55,101	100.00
Registered voters/turnout			78,765	68.88	78,765	69.96
