= Nièvre's 1st constituency =

Constituency of the National Assembly of France

1st constituency of Nièvre
- inline Constituency of the National Assembly of France

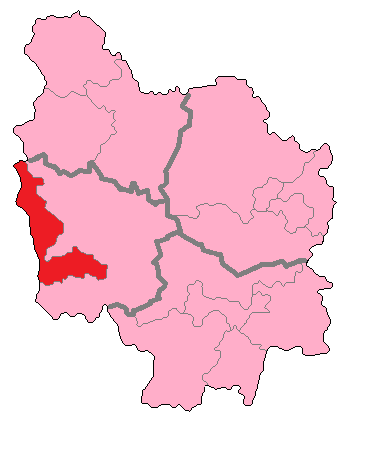
- Nièvre's 1st Constituency shown within Burgundy
- Deputy: Perrine Goulet; MoDem
- Department: Nièvre
- Cantons: La Charité-sur-Loire, Cosne-Cours-sur-Loire-Nord, Cosne-Cours-sur-Loire-Sud, Imphy, Nevers-Centre, Nevers-Est, Nevers-Nord, Nevers-Sud, Pouilly-sur-Loire, Pougues-les-Eaux, Saint-Benin-d'Azy
- Registered voters: 78,228

The 1st constituency of the Nièvre is a French legislative constituency in the Nièvre département.

== Description ==
The 1st constituency of the Nièvre covers the western portion of the department and includes the prefecture Nevers.

The seat was substantially changed prior to the 2012 election as a result of the 2010 redistricting of French legislative constituencies in which Nièvre lost one of its three historic constituencies. The new seat, like its predecessor, continued to elect Socialist representation until 2017.

The seat was represented by former Prime Minister Pierre Bérégovoy until his suicide shortly after the 1993 election, an election in which the Socialist Party under his leadership suffered a huge defeat.

== Historic Representation ==
Election	Member	Party
1986	Proportional representation – no election by constituency	
1988	Pierre Bérégovoy	PS
1988	Marcel Charmant	PS
1993	Pierre Bérégovoy	PS
1993	Didier Boulaud	PS
1997	Didier Boulaud	PS
2002	Martine Carrillon-Couvreur	PS
2007	Martine Carrillon-Couvreur	PS
2012	Martine Carrillon-Couvreur	PS
2017	Perrine Goulet	LREM
2020	Perrine Goulet	MoDem
2022	Perrine Goulet	MoDem
2024	Perrine Goulet	MoDem

== Election results ==
=== 2024 ===
Legislative Election 2024: Nièvre's 1st constituency
Party	Candidate	Votes	%	±%
DLF	Chantal Varela	628	1.36	N/A
LFI (NFP)	Brice Larèpe	9,856	21.32	−4.37
LR	Baptiste Dubost	2,482	5.37	+0.24
LO	Geneviève Lemoine	809	1.75	−0.37
MoDem (Ensemble)	Perrine Goulet	13,593	29.40	−3.31
RN	Charles-Henri Gallois	18,870	40.81	13.93
Turnout		46,238	96.56	+48.83
Registered electors		73,850		
2nd round result
MoDem	Perrine Goulet	24,627	53.67	+24.27
RN	Charles-Henri Gallois	21,256	46.33	+5.52
Turnout		45,883	94.60	−1.96
Registered electors		73,867		
MoDem hold		Swing		

=== 2022 ===
Legislative Election 2022: Nièvre's 1st constituency
Party	Candidate	Votes	%	±%
MoDem (Ensemble)	Perrine Goulet	11,287	32.71	-2.09
RN	Pauline Vigneron	9,205	26.68	+10.78
LFI (NUPÉS)	Leo Coutellec	8,863	25.69	−2.75
LR (UDC)	François Le Metayer	1,770	5.13	−4.17
REC	Bryton Verdez	1,071	3.10	N/A
DIV	Charles-Henri Gallois	805	2.33	+1.54
LO	Geneviève Lemoine	731	2.12	+1.16
Others	N/A	773	-	−
Turnout		34,505	47.73	−0.11
2nd round result
MoDem (Ensemble)	Perrine Goulet	16,554	54.43	-11.70
RN	Pauline Vigneron	13,858	45.57	+11.70
Turnout		30,412	45.20	+2.95
MoDem gain from LREM				

=== 2017 ===
Candidate	Label	First round		Second round	
Candidate	Label	Votes	%	Votes	%
Perrine Goulet	REM	12,431	34.80	18,713	66.13
Pauline Vigneron	FN	5,679	15.90	9,584	33.87
Gaëtan Gorce	PS	4,642	12.99		
Marie-Claude Taurel	FI	3,950	11.06		
Guillaume Maillard	UDI	3,324	9.30		
François Diot	PCF	1,569	4.39		
Jean-Louis Auberget	DLF	969	2.71		
Sylvie Dupart-Muzerelle	ECO	923	2.58		
Patricia Gaudry	DVD	598	1.67		
Sylvie Cardona	DIV	443	1.24		
Geneviève Lemoine	EXG	344	0.96		
Charles-Henri Gallois	DIV	282	0.79		
Mohamed Lagrib	DVD	236	0.66		
Julien Gonzalez	ECO	194	0.54		
Michel Estorge	PRG	142	0.40		
Votes		35,726	100.00	28,297	100.00
Valid votes		35,726	97.08	28,297	87.08
Blank votes		839	2.28	3,225	9.92
Null votes		234	0.64	973	2.99
Turnout		36,799	47.84	32,495	42.25
Abstentions		40,114	52.16	44,415	57.75
Registered voters		76,913		76,910	
Source: Ministry of the Interior

=== 2012 ===
Legislative Election 2012: Nièvre's 1st constituency
Party	Candidate	Votes	%	±%
PS	Martine Carrillon-Couvreur	18,896	43.57	+3.24
UMP	Jean-Luc Gauthier	8,682	20.02	−16.26
FN	Valérie Renard	6,346	14.63	+10.28
FG	Bernard Dubresson	3,596	8.29	+4.24
PRV	Jean-Luc Martinat	2,384	5.50	N/A
EELV	Wilfrid Sejeau	1,847	4.26	+0.82
Others	N/A	1,618	-	−
Turnout		43,369	55.45	−2.88
2nd round result
PS	Martine Carrillon-Couvreur	24,928	61.34	+5.27
UMP	Jean-Luc Gauthier	15,708	38.66	−5.27
Turnout		40,636	51.95	−7.58
PS hold				

=== 2007 ===
Legislative Election 2007: Nièvre's 1st constituency
Party	Candidate	Votes	%	±%
PS	Martine Carrillon-Couvreur	12,804	40.33	+4.21
UMP	Daniel Rostein	11,517	36.28	+11.81
MoDem	Martine Mazoyer	2,024	6.38	−8.28
FN	Régis de la Croix-Vaubois	1,380	4.35	−4.70
PCF	Catherine Perret	1,285	4.05	−0.55
LV	Jean-Yves Demortiere	1,092	3.44	−0.21
LCR	Fabienne Brifault	705	2.22	N/A
Others	N/A	940	-	−
Turnout		32,442	58.33	−2.68
2nd round result
PS	Martine Carrillon-Couvreur	17,919	56.07	+0.90
UMP	Daniel Rostein	14,039	43.93	−0.90
Turnout		33,111	59.53	+0.27
PS hold				

=== 2002 ===
Legislative Election 2002: Nièvre's 1st constituency
Party	Candidate	Votes	%	±%
PS	Martine Carrillon-Couvreur	5,508	36.12	−4.73
UMP	Daniel Rostein	3,731	24.47	N/A
UDF	Philippe Morel	2,235	14.66	−8.63
FN	Régis de la Croix-Vaubois	1,380	9.05	−2.26
PCF	Daniel Surieu	702	4.60	−5.94
LV	Fabrice Verin	557	3.65	+0.77
LO	Geneviève Lemoine	334	2.19	−1.28
Others	N/A	803	-	−
Turnout		15,601	61.01	−7.46
2nd round result
PS	Martine Carrillon-Couvreur	17,291	55.17	−9.66
UMP	Daniel Rostein	14,051	44.83	N/A
Turnout		32,805	59.26	−10.85
PS hold				

=== 1997 ===
Legislative Election 1997: Nièvre's 1st constituency
Party	Candidate	Votes	%	±%
PS	Didier Boulaud	14,819	40.85	
PR (UDF)	Constantin Sollogoub	8,450	23.29	
FN	Jean-Marc Billy	4,101	11.31	
PCF	Daniel Surieu	3,825	10.54	
LO	Geneviève Lemoine	1,260	3.47	
LV	Alain Nicolas	1,046	2.88	
LDI	Jean-Michel Boizot	857	2.36	
DVE	Stéphane Berscheid	726	2.00	
Others	N/A	1,191	-	
Turnout		37,999	68.47	
2nd round result
PS	Didier Boulaud	23,696	64.83	
PR (UDF)	Constantin Sollogoub	12,856	35.17	
Turnout		38,908	70.11	
PS hold				

== Sources ==
Official results of French elections from 2002: "Résultats électoraux officiels en France" (in French).
