= Myennes =

- Commune
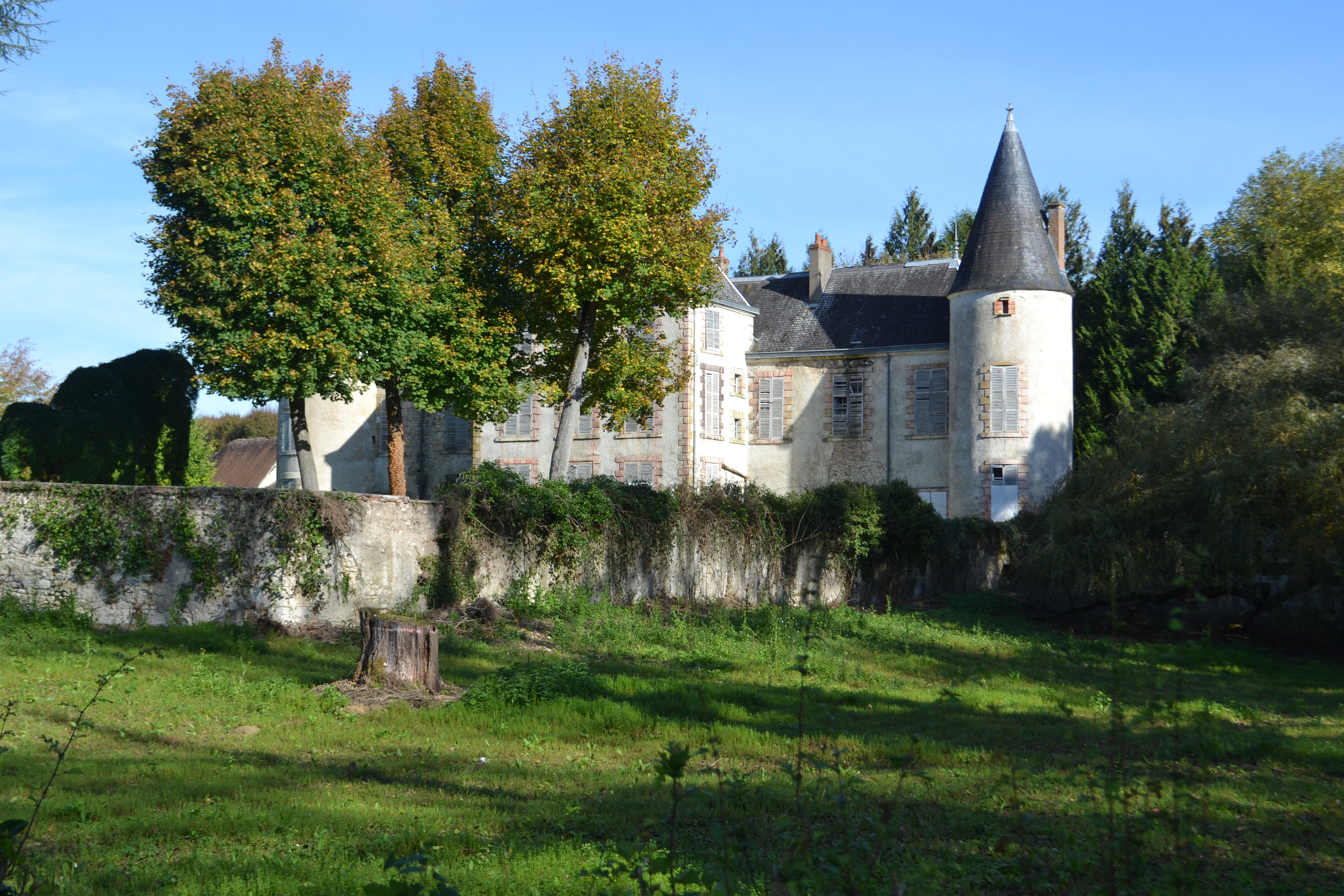
- The Chateau of Myennes
- Location of Myennes
- Location within France Location within Bourgogne-Franche-Comté
- Coordinates: 47°26′50″N 2°56′05″E
- Country: France
- Region: Bourgogne-Franche-Comté
- Department: Nièvre
- Arrondissement: Cosne-Cours-sur-Loire
- Canton: Cosne-Cours-sur-Loire

Government
  - Mayor (2020–2026): Françoise Pillard
- Area^{1}: 7.40 km^{2} (2.86 sq mi)
- Highest elevation: 217 m (712 ft)
- Lowest elevation: 136 m (446 ft)
- Population (2023): 535
  - Density: 72.3/km^{2} (187/sq mi)
- Time zone: UTC+01:00 (CET)
  - Summer (DST): UTC+02:00 (CEST)
- INSEE/Postal code: 58187 /58440
- ^{1} French Land Register data, which excludes lakes, ponds, glaciers > 1 km^{2} (0.386 sq mi or 247 acres) and river estuaries.

Myennes (French pronunciation: [mjɛn]) is a commune in the Nièvre department in central France.

== See also ==
- Communes of the Nièvre department
