= Saint-Loup-des-Bois =

- Commune
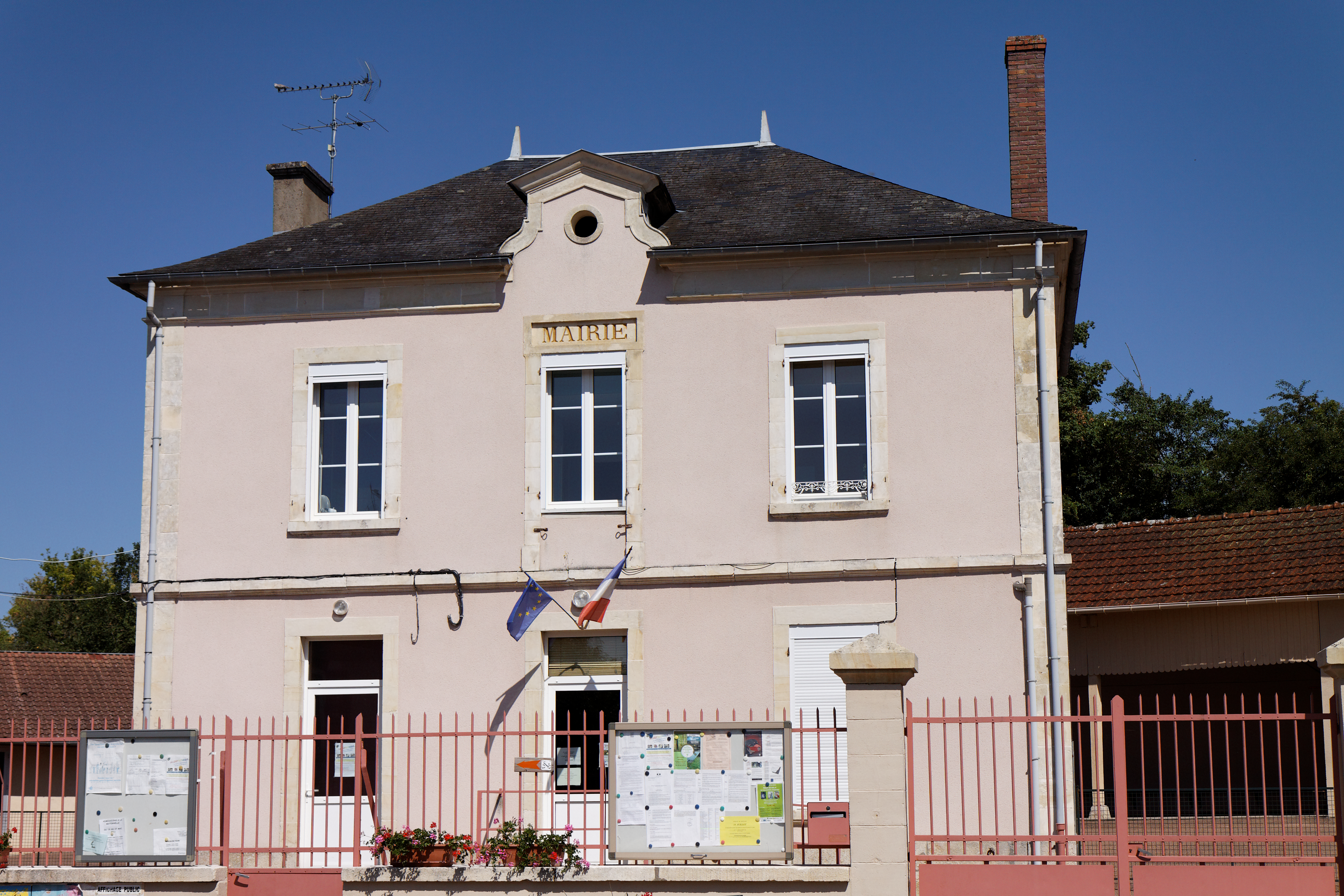
- The town hall in Saint-Loup-des-Bois
- Location of Saint-Loup-des-Bois
- Location within France Location within Bourgogne-Franche-Comté
- Coordinates: 47°26′47″N 3°00′14″E
- Country: France
- Region: Bourgogne-Franche-Comté
- Department: Nièvre
- Arrondissement: Cosne-Cours-sur-Loire
- Canton: Cosne-Cours-sur-Loire

Government
  - Mayor (2020–2026): Stéphanie Chapuis
- Area^{1}: 17.28 km^{2} (6.67 sq mi)
- Highest elevation: 283 m (928 ft)
- Lowest elevation: 188 m (617 ft)
- Population (2023): 459
  - Density: 26.6/km^{2} (68.8/sq mi)
- Time zone: UTC+01:00 (CET)
  - Summer (DST): UTC+02:00 (CEST)
- INSEE/Postal code: 58251 /58200
- ^{1} French Land Register data, which excludes lakes, ponds, glaciers > 1 km^{2} (0.386 sq mi or 247 acres) and river estuaries.

Saint-Loup-des-Bois (French pronunciation: [sɛ̃ lu de bwa]; before 2022: Saint-Loup) is a commune in the Nièvre department in central France.

== Demographics ==
Historical population
| Year | Pop. | ±% p.a. |
|---|---|---|
| 1968 | 443 | — |
| 1975 | 404 | −1.31% |
| 1982 | 430 | +0.89% |
| 1990 | 448 | +0.51% |
| 1999 | 440 | −0.20% |
| 2007 | 455 | +0.42% |
| 2012 | 490 | +1.49% |
| 2017 | 468 | −0.91% |
| 2023 | 459 | −0.32% |
Source: INSEE

== See also ==
- Communes of the Nièvre department
