= La Celle-sur-Loire =

- Commune
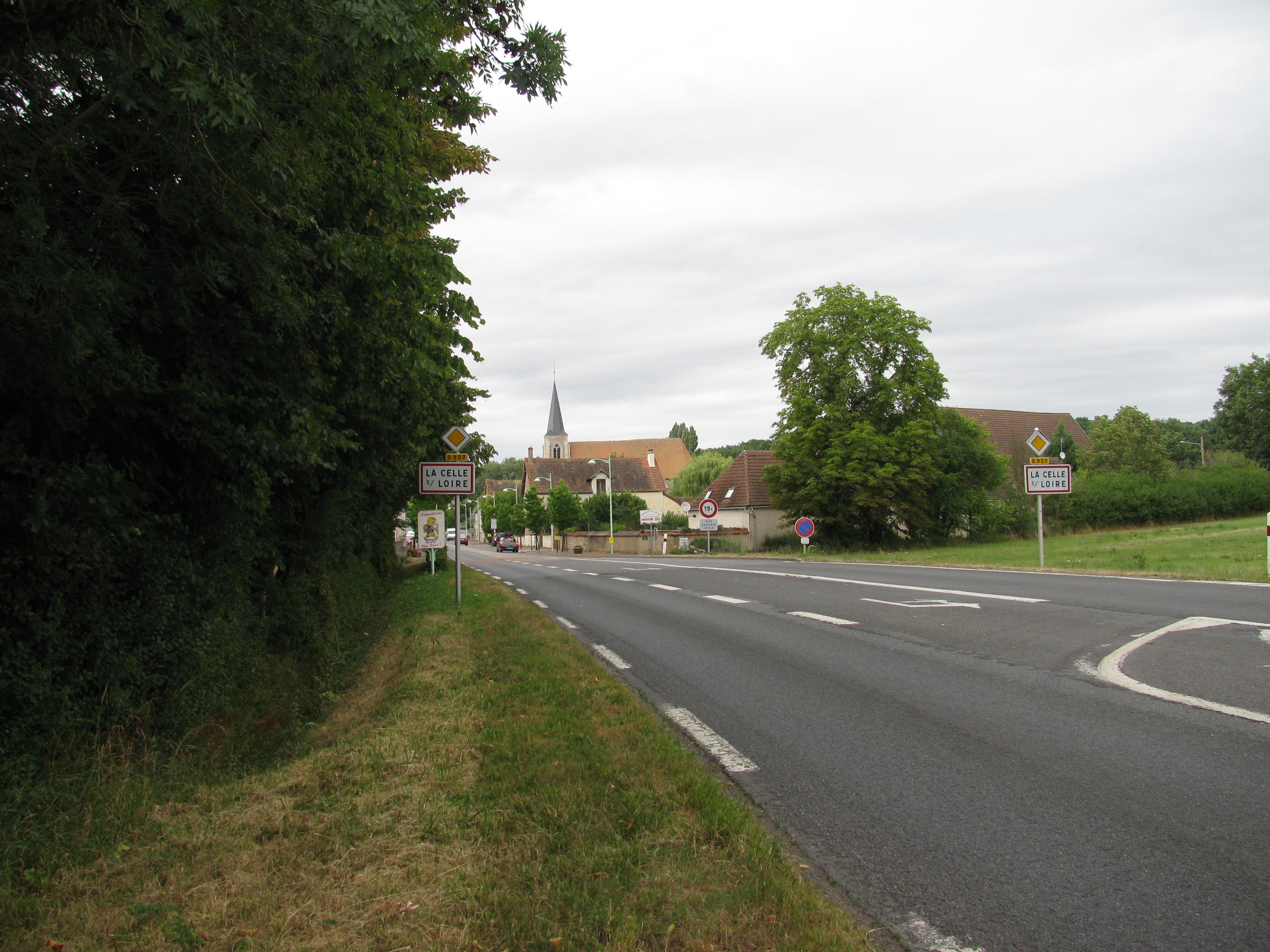
- Location of La Celle-sur-Loire
- Location within France Location within Bourgogne-Franche-Comté
- Coordinates: 47°28′23″N 2°55′50″E
- Country: France
- Region: Bourgogne-Franche-Comté
- Department: Nièvre
- Arrondissement: Cosne-Cours-sur-Loire
- Canton: Cosne-Cours-sur-Loire

Government
  - Mayor (2020–2026): Danielle Roy
- Area^{1}: 21.17 km^{2} (8.17 sq mi)
- Highest elevation: 233 m (764 ft)
- Lowest elevation: 132 m (433 ft)
- Population (2023): 785
  - Density: 37.1/km^{2} (96.0/sq mi)
- Time zone: UTC+01:00 (CET)
  - Summer (DST): UTC+02:00 (CEST)
- INSEE/Postal code: 58044 /58440
- ^{1} French Land Register data, which excludes lakes, ponds, glaciers > 1 km^{2} (0.386 sq mi or 247 acres) and river estuaries.

La Celle-sur-Loire (French pronunciation: [la sɛl syʁ lwaʁ], literally La Celle on Loire) is a commune in the Nièvre department in central France.

== Population ==
Historical population
Year	Pop.	±% p.a.
1968	627	—
1975	660	+0.74%
1982	759	+2.02%
1990	859	+1.56%
1999	798	−0.82%
2007	822	+0.37%
2012	851	+0.70%
2017	830	−0.50%
2023	785	−0.92%
Source: INSEE

== See also ==
- Communes of the Nièvre department
