= Nièvre's 3rd constituency =

Constituency of the French Fifth Republic

The 3 legislative districts of Nièvre from 1988 to 2012.

Nièvre's 3rd constituency was a French legislative constituency in the Nièvre département. It was abolished in the 2010 redistricting of French legislative constituencies

At the 2002 French legislative election, the MP elected was Christian Paul of the Socialist Party. Paul was re-elected in the 2007 election.

The constituency was abolished in 2010, and the territory covered was merged with Nièvre's 2nd constituency, which Christian Paul won in the 2012 election.
