= Julia Cload =

British pianist (1946–2012)

Background information
- Born: October 6, 1946; London, England
- Died: July 31, 2012 (aged 65) Alligny-Cosne, Nièvre, France
- Education: Royal College of Music; Franz Liszt Academy of Music
- Genres: Baroque
- Occupation: Pianist
- Label: Meridian Records
- Spouse: Nicholas Hawtrey

Julia Cload (October 6, 1946 – July 31, 2012) was a British pianist. She was noted for her recordings of Baroque music, especially that of Joseph Haydn and J. S. Bach.

== Early life ==
Cload was born in London in 1946. Her mother was a violinist and teacher, and her father, John Cload, was a violist and founding member of the London Philharmonic Orchestra. She attended St Joseph's Convent in Hendon, northwest London and later studied piano with Hilda Bor. She attended the Royal College of Music in South Kensington. As a student, she won the London Philharmonic's piano concerto competition.

After winning a scholarship to study at the Franz Liszt Academy of Music in Budapest for three years, she studied with Lajos Hernadi (1906–1986), a student of Béla Bartók and Artur Schnabel. Cload also studied with Maria Curcio and Hans Keller. While at the academy, she frequently heard performances of Haydn's string quartets by the Tátrai Quartet. This, along with her exposure to Romani music while in Hungary, gave her insight into the work of Haydn.

== Career ==
After winning the London Philharmonic concerto competition, Cload made her debut with the London Philharmonic under Sir Adrian Boult, playing Beethoven's Piano Concerto No. 3. After an acclaimed Wigmore Hall debut, she began to play with most major British orchestras, including the Royal Philharmonic Orchestra, London Mozart Players, Royal Liverpool Philharmonic, BBC Scottish Symphony Orchestra, and The Hallé in Manchester. She collaborated with conductors like Sir James Loughran and Christopher Seaman.

Cload became a regular recitalist at major concert halls in London and recorded for the BBC. Among her most notable performances were Beethoven's Piano Concerto No. 4 with Sir John Pritchard, Tchaikovsky's Piano Concerto No. 1 under Vilém Tauský, and Mozart Piano Concerto No. 23 at the invitation of Sir Bernard Haitink. The latter was praised by critic Ernest Bradbury for her "poise and fluency, forethought and poetic imagination."

Her performance of the Bach Goldberg Variations (BWV 988) at the Besançon International Music Festival in 2001 was recorded by Meridian Records to great acclaim. Classic CD called it "illuminating playing", with Musical Opinion drawing comparisons to Glenn Gould. Cload performed at other major festivals, including the Spitalfields and Festival Academy Budapest (FAB), and she played at the Liszt Society in Starnberg and the Chopin Society in London.

She signed with Meridian and recorded the complete Haydn keyboard sonatas to critical acclaim, with Gramophone praising her "eager, spontaneous-sounding... range of colour...a thing of untrammeled wit and brio" and Piano Magazine describing it as her most "haunting...eloquent and...lastingly illuminating" recording. She also recorded the Schumann sonatas.

Cload died in 2012 after a long illness.

== Personal life ==
Cload was married to the actor Nicholas Hawtrey. The couple lived in Alligny-Cosne, Nièvre, in central France.

== Recordings ==
- J. S. Bach: The Well-Tempered Clavier Vol. 1 (Meridian Records, 1998) CDE 84384/5 *
- J. S. Bach: The Well-Tempered Clavier Vol. 2 (Meridian Records, 2005) CDE 8472/3-2 *
- Haydn Keyboard Sonatas (Meridian Records, 2009) CDE 84578/9-2 *
- J. S. Bach Goldberg Variations, Preludes and Fugues (Meridian Records, 2009) CDE 84291
