= Pougny =

Pougny is the name of several communes in France:

- Pougny, Ain
- Pougny, Nièvre

Besides, Pougny is the surname of the Russian-French painter Ivan Puni (Jean Pougny, 1892–1956), that he has adopted after his emigration to France in 1923–1924.
