= Cantons of the Nièvre department =

The following is a list of the 17 cantons of the Nièvre department, in France, following the French canton reorganisation which came into effect in March 2015:

- La Charité-sur-Loire
- Château-Chinon
- Clamecy
- Corbigny
- Cosne-Cours-sur-Loire
- Decize
- Fourchambault
- Guérigny
- Imphy
- Luzy
- Nevers-1
- Nevers-2
- Nevers-3
- Nevers-4
- Pouilly-sur-Loire
- Saint-Pierre-le-Moûtier
- Varennes-Vauzelles
