= Arrondissements of the Nièvre department =

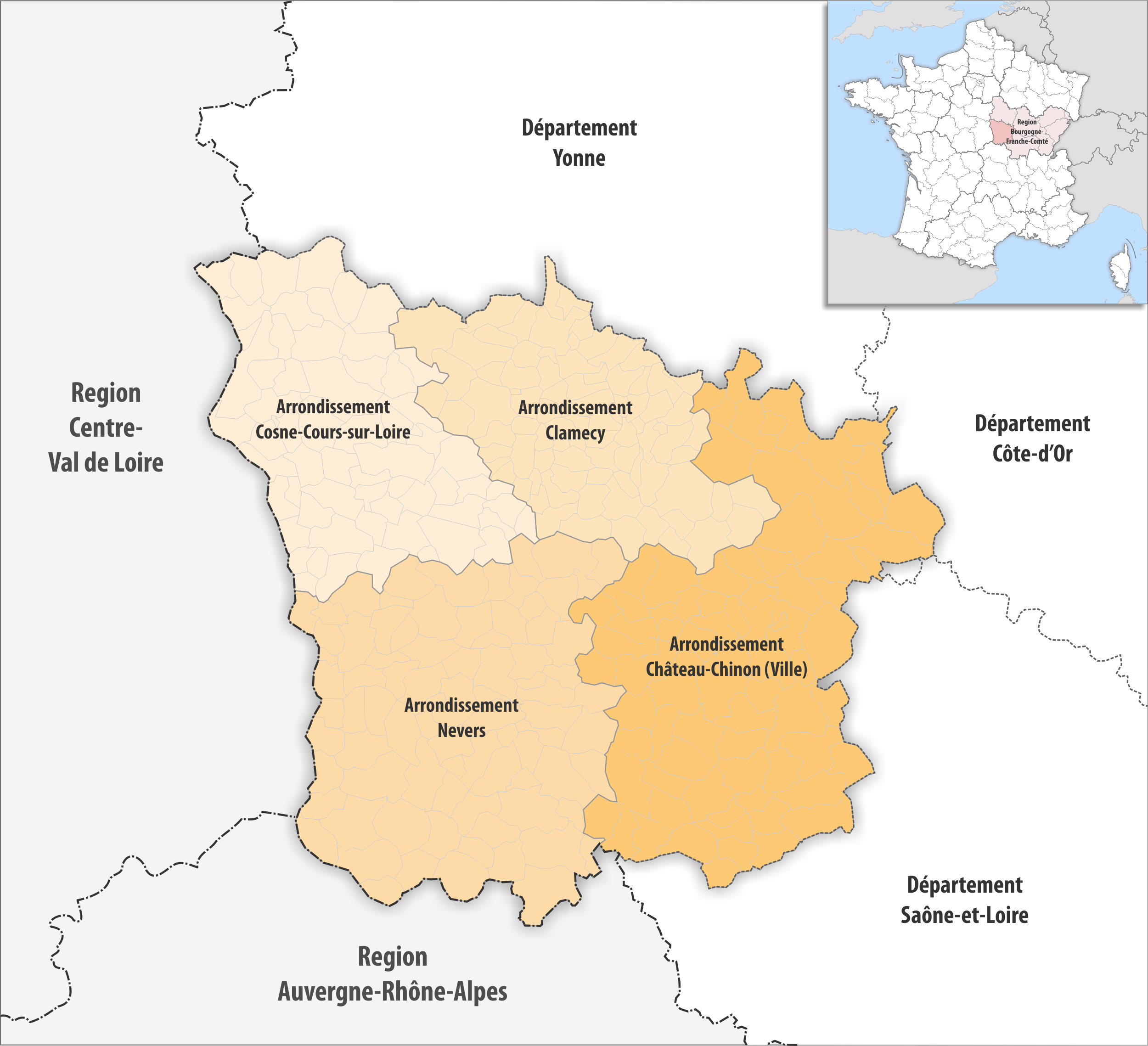
Map of arrondissements of the Nièvre department.

The 4 arrondissements of the Nièvre department are:

1. Arrondissement of Château-Chinon (Ville), (subprefecture: Château-Chinon (Ville)) with 80 communes. The population of the arrondissement was 27,268 in 2021.
2. Arrondissement of Clamecy, (subprefecture: Clamecy) with 84 communes. The population of the arrondissement was 20,156 in 2021.
3. Arrondissement of Cosne-Cours-sur-Loire, (subprefecture: Cosne-Cours-sur-Loire) with 63 communes. The population of the arrondissement was 42,206 in 2021.
4. Arrondissement of Nevers, (prefecture of the Nièvre department: Nevers) with 82 communes. The population of the arrondissement was 112,787 in 2021.

== History ==
In 1800 the arrondissements of Nevers, Château-Chinon, Clamecy and Cosne were established. The arrondissement of Cosne was disbanded in 1926, and restored in 1943.

The borders of the arrondissements of Nièvre were modified in January 2017:

- one commune from the arrondissement of Château-Chinon (Ville) to the arrondissement of Clamecy
- one commune from the arrondissement of Château-Chinon (Ville) to the arrondissement of Nevers
- nine communes from the arrondissement of Clamecy to the arrondissement of Château-Chinon (Ville)
- one commune from the arrondissement of Cosne-Cours-sur-Loire to the arrondissement of Clamecy
- one commune from the arrondissement of Nevers to the arrondissement of Château-Chinon (Ville)
