= Cosne =

Cosne may refer to three communes in France:

- Cosne-Cours-sur-Loire
- Cosne-d'Allier
- Alligny-Cosne
