= Meridian Records =

British independent record label (founded in 1977)

Meridian Records is a British independent record label based in London. It was founded in 1977 by Francis Loring and John Shuttleworth. Since then Meridian has celebrated more than a third of a century of recording classical music in its well regarded 'natural sound'.

Meridian has traditionally specialised in recording relatively unknown works and/or artists at the beginning of their careers. Accordingly, it has played an important part in creating the early reputations of musicians as diverse as The Sixteen, solo and chamber pianist Christine Croshaw, clarinetist Anna Hashimoto, tenor Ian Partridge, pianist John Bingham, the Lindsay Quartet, Onyx Brass, and organist David Sanger, among others. Distinguished musicians from all over the globe have recorded on the label, including a series of releases by pianist Fou Ts'ong ("the greatest living Chinese performer" according to Timeout magazine), as well as Baroque pianist Julia Cload and South African virtuoso double-bassist Leon Bosch – a favourite on Classic FM, BBC Radio 3 and Radio 4.

Meridian has also played a role in educating those who want to get into the classical music recording business, being one of the earliest record labels to pioneer a training and internship scheme at its Greenwich base.

Meridian is owned and run by Richard Hughes.

== See also ==
- List of record labels
