= Nièvre's 2nd constituency =

Constituency of the National Assembly of France

2nd constituency of Nièvre
- inline Constituency of the National Assembly of France

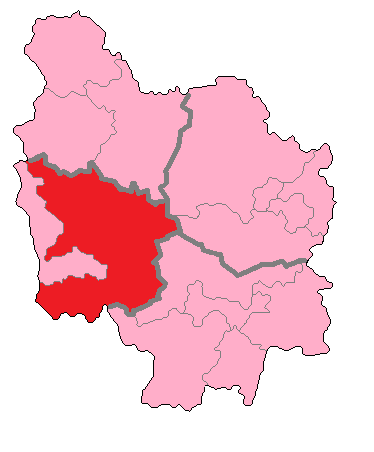
- Nièvre's 2nd Constituency shown within Burgundy
- Deputy: Julien Guibert; RN
- Department: Nièvre
- Cantons: Brinon-sur-Beuvron, Château-Chinon (Ville), Châtillon-en-Bazois, Clamecy, Corbigny, Decize, Donzy, Dornes, Fours, Guérigny, Lormes, Luzy, La Machine, Montsauche-les-Settons, Moulins-Engilbert, Prémery, Saint-Amand-en-Puisaye, Saint-Pierre-le-Moûtier, Saint-Saulge, Tannay, Varzy
- Registered voters: 86,663

The 2nd constituency of the Nièvre is a French legislative constituency in the Nièvre département in France.

== Description ==
The three constituencies of Nièvre prior to 2010

Following the 2010 redistricting of French legislative constituencies, the 2nd constituency of the Nièvre covers the largely rural east and centre of the department. Before this, the constituency was based in the north-west of the department.

Until 2017, the constituency returned Socialists at every election since 1988 with the exception of the 1993 election. It was won by ENA graduate Christian Paul in 2012 who previously had represented Nièvre's 3rd constituency, which was combined with parts of the 2nd to form a new 2nd constituency in the 2010 redistricting.

It includes Chateau-Chinon, for many years the electoral base of President François Mitterrand.

== Historic Representation ==
Election	Member	Party
1986	Proportional representation – no election by constituency	
1988	Jacques Huyghues des Etages	PS
1993	Didier Béguin	UDF
1997	Gaëtan Gorce	PS
2002	Gaëtan Gorce	PS
2007	Gaëtan Gorce	PS
2012	Christian Paul	PS
2017	Patrice Perrot	LREM
2022	Patrice Perrot	LREM
2024	Julien Guibert	RN

== Election results ==
=== 2024 ===
Legislative Election 2024: Nièvre's 2nd constituency
Party	Candidate	Votes	%	±%
DIV	Aurore Munoz	801	1.53	N/A
LR	Marc-Alexandre Vincent	2,757	5.26	−5.58
LO	Dominique Dupuis	839	1.60	− 0.77
PS	Christian Paul	13,788	26.32	N/A
RN	Julien Guibert	23,481	44.83	+16.96
RE (Ensemble)	Sandra Germain	10,708	20.44	−6.39
Turnout		52,383	96.55	+43.55
Registered electors		78,765		
2nd round result
RN	Julien Guibert	27,522	54.82	+9.99
PS	Christian Paul	22,686	45.18	+18.86
Turnout		50,208	91.12	−5.43
Registered electors		78,765		
RN gain from RE				

=== 2022 ===
Legislative Election 2022: Nièvre's 2nd constituency
Party	Candidate	Votes	%	±%
RN	Julien Guibert	11,438	27.87	+12.69
LREM (Ensemble)	Patrice Perrot	11,010	26.83	-6.98
LFI (NUPÉS)	Marie Anne Guillemain	10,004	24.38	-9.49
LR (UDC)	Christophe Deniaux	4,450	10.84	+1.93
REC	Marie Joelle Guillaume	1,659	4.04	N/A
LO	Dominique Dupuis	972	2.37	+1.65
DLF (RPR)	Pascal Lepetit	880	2.14	+0.30
PA	Heloïse Megy	625	1.52	N/A
Turnout		41,038	53.00	−0.33
2nd round result
LREM (Ensemble)	Patrice Perrot	15,577	36.59	-18.03
RN	Julien Guibert	15,472	36.34	N/A
LFI (NUPÉS)	Marie Anne Guillemain	11,527	27.07	−18.25
Turnout		42,576	55.08	+7.10
LREM hold				

=== 2017 ===
Candidate	Label	First round		Second round	
Candidate	Label	Votes	%	Votes	%
Patrice Perrot	REM	14,441	33.81	18,883	54.62
Christian Paul	PS	7,812	18.29	15,686	45.38
Harold Blanot	FN	6,485	15.18		
Marie-Anne Guillemain	FI	4,342	10.17		
Annie Legrain	LR	3,804	8.91		
Monique Choquel	PCF	1,523	3.57		
Fabienne Cardot	DVD	1,199	2.81		
Patrick Vanhersecke	DLF	808	1.89		
Gilbert Champagne	ECO	787	1.84		
Jean de Rohan-Chabot	DIV	412	0.96		
Bernard Gagnepain	ECO	397	0.93		
Henri Massol	EXD	396	0.93		
Dominique Dupuis	EXG	309	0.72		
Votes		42,715	100.00	34,569	100.00
Valid votes		42,715	97.23	34,569	87.46
Blank votes		785	1.79	2,968	7.51
Null votes		432	0.98	1,988	5.03
Turnout		43,932	53.33	39,525	47.98
Abstentions		38,447	46.67	42,850	52.02
Registered voters		82,379		82,375	
Source: Ministry of the Interior

=== 2012 ===
Legislative Election 2012: Nièvre's 2nd constituency
Party	Candidate	Votes	%	±%
PS	Christian Paul	25,465	49.54	+9.45
UMP	Michèle Boucomont	11,092	21.58	−11.67
FN	Marcel Stephan	7,183	13.97	+9.57
FG	Monique Choquel	3,450	6.71	+0.70
EELV	Anais Hubert	1,427	2.78	±0.00
Others	N/A	2,783	-	−
Turnout		51,400	59.30	−2.27
2nd round result
PS	Christian Paul	31,471	65.55	+7.84
UMP	Michèle Boucomont	16,538	34.45	−7.84
Turnout		48,009	55.40	−7.17
PS hold				

=== 2007 ===
Legislative Election 2007: Nièvre's 2nd constituency
Party	Candidate	Votes	%	±%
PS	Gaëtan Gorce	14,670	40.09	+5.25
UMP	Annie Legrain	12,168	33.25	+6.51
PCF	Monique Choquel	2,198	6.01	−3.01
FN	Claude Le Bris	1,609	4.40	−7.67
MoDem	Isabelle Bonnicel	1,540	4.21	N/A
LV	Wilfrid Sejeau	1,016	2.78	+0.12
LCR	Thierry Guintrand	763	2.09	N/A
Others	N/A	2,630	-	−
Turnout		37,304	61.57	−2.65
2nd round result
PS	Gaëtan Gorce	21,219	57.71	+1.68
UMP	Annie Legrain	15,551	42.29	−1.68
Turnout		37,928	62.57	+1.65
PS hold				

=== 2002 ===
Legislative Election 2002: Nièvre's 2nd constituency
Party	Candidate	Votes	%	±%
PS	Gaëtan Gorce	13,040	34.84	+6.90
UMP	Monique Cousin	10,010	26.74	N/A
FN	Annick Brunaud	4,519	12.07	−0.42
PCF	Liliane Depresle	3,377	9.02	−13.56
DIV	Marc Poussière	1,085	2.90	N/A
LV	Jean-François Notebaert	994	2.66	−0.26
CPNT	Marie-Josèphe Charpentier	835	2.23	N/A
Others	N/A	3,571	-	−
Turnout		38,428	64.22	−6.94
2nd round result
PS	Gaëtan Gorce	19,365	56.03	−4.11
UMP	Monique Cousin	15,195	43.97	N/A
Turnout		36,452	60.92	−13.06
PS hold				

=== 1997 ===
Legislative Election 1997: Nièvre's 2nd constituency
Party	Candidate	Votes	%	±%
PS	Gaëtan Gorce	11,094	27.94	
PPDF (UDF)	Didier Béguin	9,892	24.92	
PCF	André Périnaud	8,965	22.58	
FN	Robert Bouter	4,959	12.49	
LV	Jean-Luc Dreumont	1,161	2.92	
LDI	Martine Mazoyer	1,042	2.62	
Others	N/A	2,589	-	
Turnout		41,806	71.16	
2nd round result
PS	Gaëtan Gorce	24,409	60.14	
PPDF (UDF)	Didier Béguin	16,177	39.86	
Turnout		43,457	73.98	
PS gain from PPDF				

== Sources ==
Official results of French elections from 2002: "Résultats électoraux officiels en France" (in French).
