= Alligny-Cosne =

- Commune
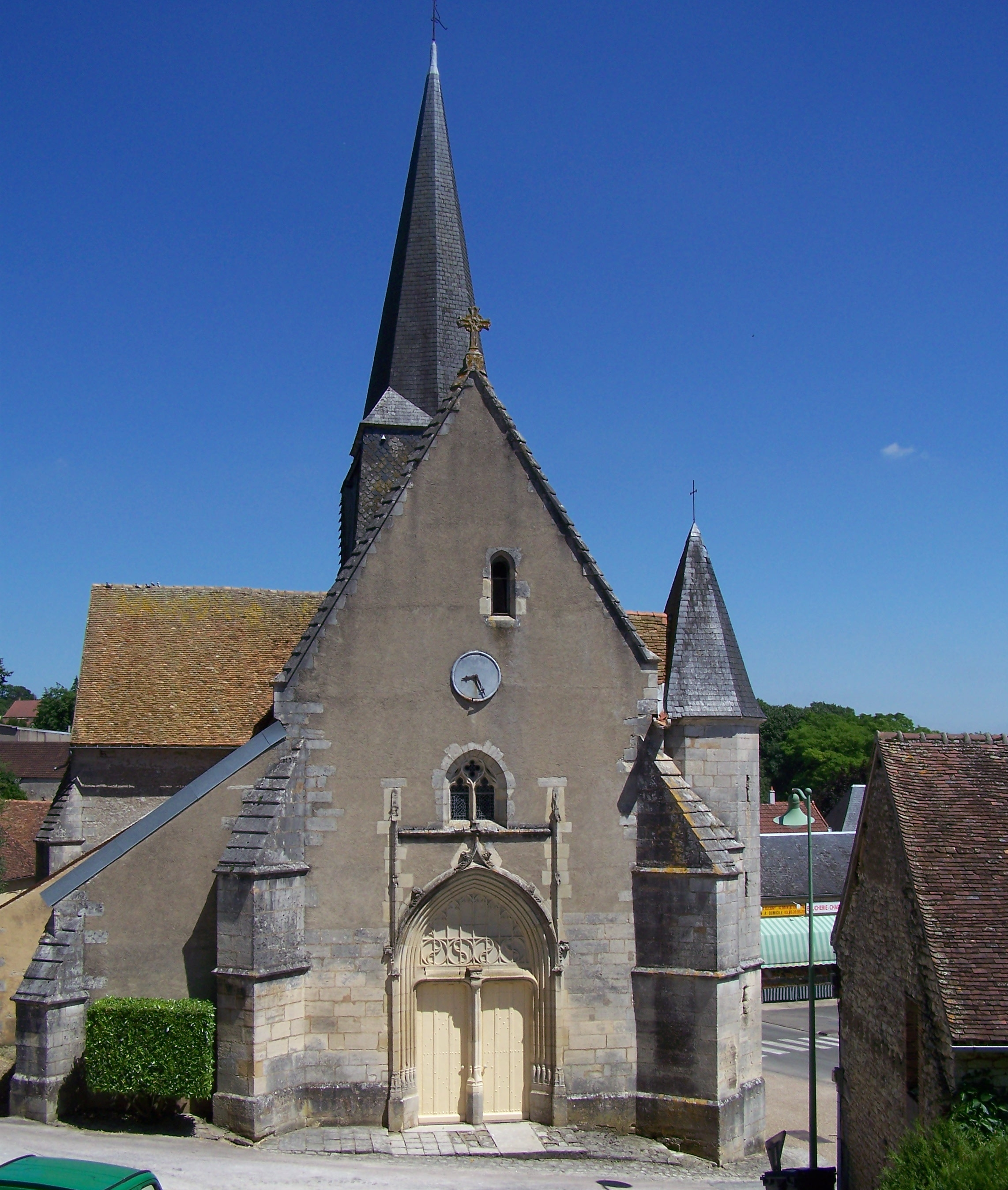
- The church in Alligny-Cosne
- Location of Alligny-Cosne
- Location within France Location within Bourgogne-Franche-Comté
- Coordinates: 47°27′18″N 3°03′46″E
- Country: France
- Region: Bourgogne-Franche-Comté
- Department: Nièvre
- Arrondissement: Cosne-Cours-sur-Loire
- Canton: Cosne-Cours-sur-Loire

Government
  - Mayor (2020–2026): Philippe Bourgeois
- Area^{1}: 34.41 km^{2} (13.29 sq mi)
- Elevation: 275 m (902 ft)
- Highest elevation: 331 m (1,086 ft)
- Lowest elevation: 192 m (630 ft)
- Population (2023): 926
  - Density: 26.9/km^{2} (69.7/sq mi)
- Time zone: UTC+01:00 (CET)
  - Summer (DST): UTC+02:00 (CEST)
- INSEE/Postal code: 58002 /58200
- ^{1} French Land Register data, which excludes lakes, ponds, glaciers > 1 km^{2} (0.386 sq mi or 247 acres) and river estuaries.

Alligny-Cosne (French pronunciation: [aliɲi kon]) is a commune in the Nièvre department in central France.

== Population ==
Historical population
Year	Pop.	±% p.a.
1968	723	—
1975	685	−0.77%
1982	711	+0.53%
1990	809	+1.63%
1999	824	+0.20%
2007	863	+0.58%
2012	858	−0.12%
2017	877	+0.44%
2023	926	+0.91%
Source: INSEE

Notable past residents include Julia Cload and actor Nicholas Hawtrey.

== See also ==
- Communes of the Nièvre department
