= Martine Carrillon-Couvreur =

French politician

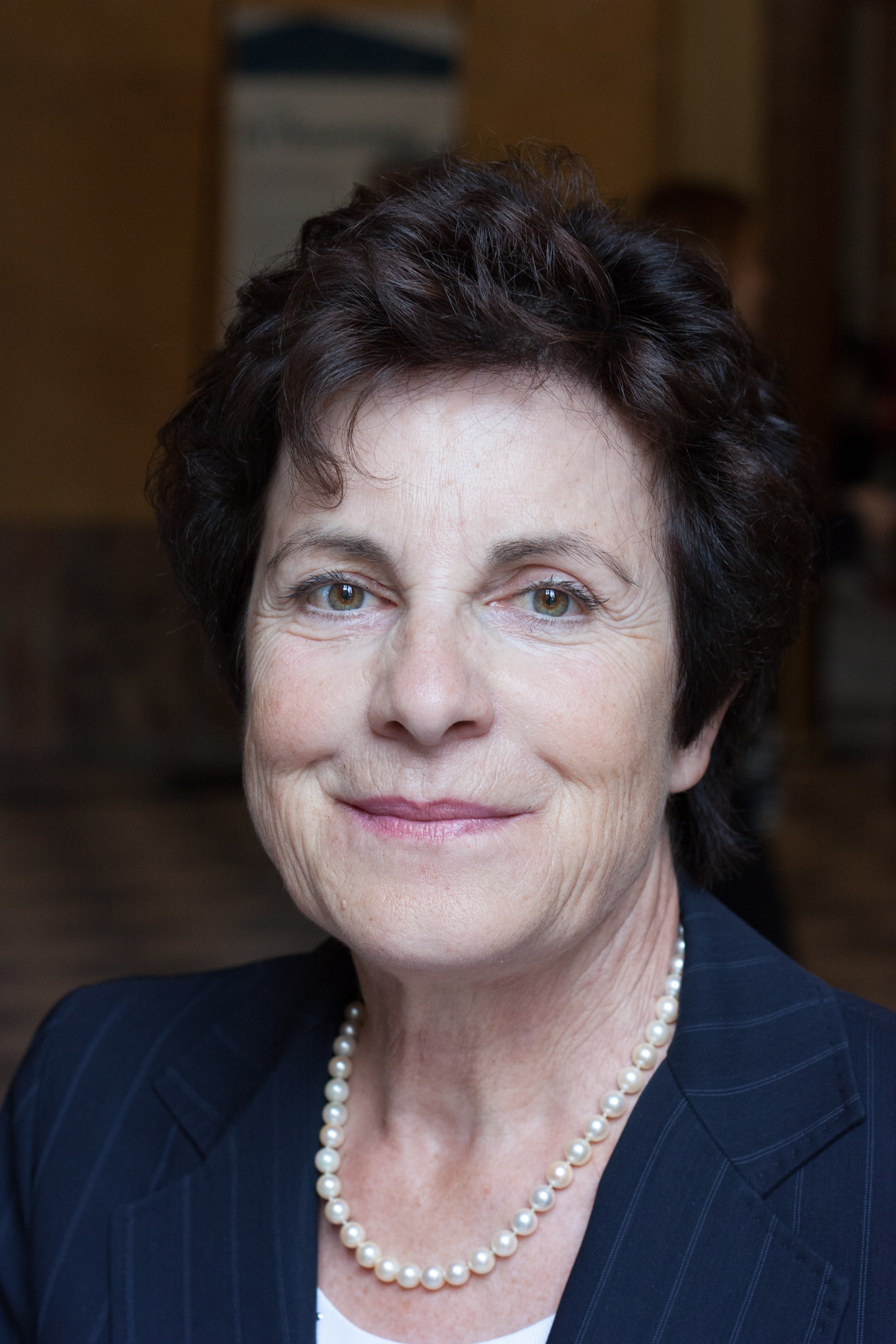
Martine Carrillon-Couvreur

Martine Carrillon-Couvreur (born 21 March 1948) is a member of the National Assembly of France. She represented the 1st constituency of the Nièvre department from 2002 to 2017, and is a member of the Socialiste, radical, citoyen et divers gauche.

== Biography ==
Director of a medical-educational institute, she became deputy mayor of Nevers in 2001 before being elected on June 16, 2002, as representative of the first Nièvre's 1st constituency. She was re-elected deputy on June 17, 2007, and June 17, 2012, and renewed her position as deputy mayor in March 2008 until March 30, 2014.

Martine Carrillon-Couvreur has been a member of the Socialist Group in the National Assembly (France) since 2002. She is a member of the Committee on Cultural, Family, and Social Affairs. From November 2012 to October 2015, she served as President of the National Consultative Council for People with Disabilities (CNCPH).

She endorsed Emmanuel Macron in the 2017 presidential election. In line with the commitment, she made in 2012, she chose not to run for re-election in the 2017 legislative elections.
