= Gaëtan Gorce =

French politician (born 1958)

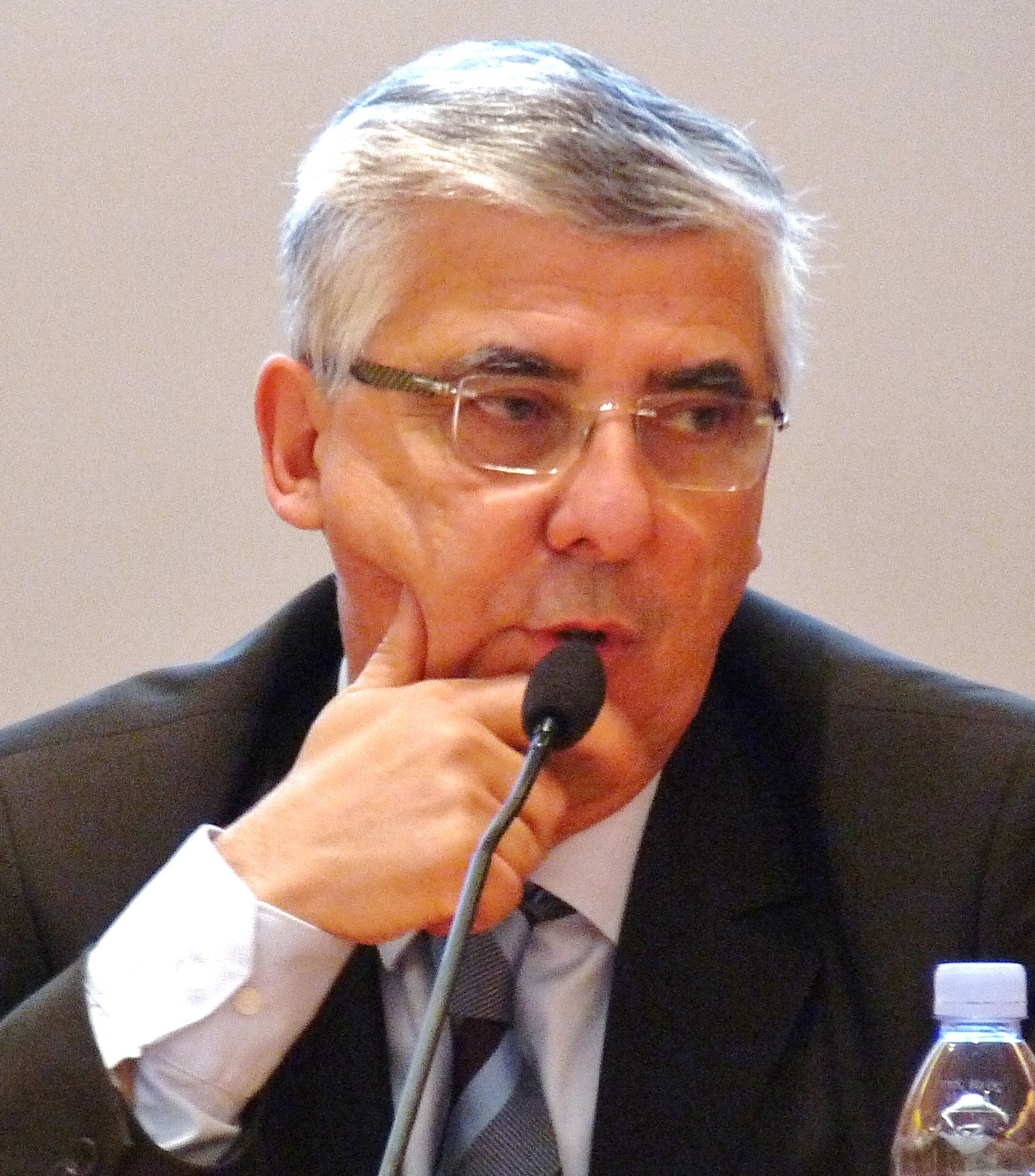
- Gaëtan Gorce

Member of the French Senate for Nièvre
- In office 2011–2017

Member of the National Assembly for Nièvre's 2nd constituency
- In office 1997–2011
- Preceded by: René-Pierre Signé
- Succeeded by: Christian Paul

Personal details
- Born: 2 December 1958 (age 67) Luzy, France
- Party: Socialist Party
- Education: Sciences Po, ÉNA

Gaëtan Gorce (born December 2, 1958, in Luzy, Nièvre) is a member of the National Assembly of France. He represents the Nièvre department, and is a member of the Socialiste, radical, citoyen et divers gauche.

== Education ==
Gorce earned a law degree in 1979, then graduated from Sciences Po in 1981 and from ENA in 1987 alongside future National Assembly colleague Christian Paul.

== Professional career ==
As the administrator of Paris, then as sub-prefect and civil administrator, Gorce collaborated with Maurice Benassayag, interministerial delegate of Rapatriés (1988-1989), Pierre Joxe at the Ministry of the Interior (1989-1991), Edith Cresson in Matignon (1991-1992), and with François Mitterrand as the president of the Republic (1992-1995).

== Political career ==
Gorce is a member of the Socialist Party, which he joined in 1974. He led the New Voice movement and initiated the Renovators movement within the Socialist Party, notably alongside Manuel Valls, Patrick Bloche, Christophe Caresche, and Jean-Patrick Gille.

Though he lost the municipal elections of 1995 in Cosne-Cours-sur-Loire, he nevertheless served as municipal counselor of the city until 2001. He was elected mayor of La Charité-sur-Loire in March 2001, and later re-elected in March 2008. As mayor, he launched a program to rehabilitate the city's historic center, founded the Festival du Mot with Marc Lecarpentier, and earned La Charité-sur-Loire the "city of art and history" label. He chose not to run for mayor in 2014 but remained a municipal councilor in the majority list until December 2017, when he left the post.

Gorce was elected as a delegate to the second constituency of Nièvre in June 1997, then re-elected in June 2002 and June 2007. He was a member of the Social Affairs Committee, then of the National Assembly's Finance Committee as a special rapporteur on the employment budget, and finally of Foreign Affairs. As National employment secretary of the Socialist Party (1999-2005), he was rapporteur for the 35-hour week law. During he second term, he and Jean Leonetti co-chaired the information mission on end-of-life support, which led to the unanimous adoption of the Law on the rights of patients and the end of life by the National Assembly. For this action, Gorce received the Trombinoscope prize of "Delegate of the Year" in 2004.

Supporting Ségolène Royal during the 2007 presidential campaign, in June he resigned from the national bodies of the PS and called for the resignation of Prime Secretary François Hollande, whom he held responsible for the defeat.

Still supporting Ségolène Royal at the 2008 Reims Congress, he returned briefly to the leadership of the Socialist Party (as national secretary of the PS responsible for exclusion), before leaving it definitively a few months later.

In 2009, he opposed the bill aimed at liberalizing internet gambling, judging the opening of this market to be inappropriate, in particular for reasons of public health.

In September 2009, he rejoined the Foreign Affairs Committee of the National Assembly, while remaining vice-president of human rights organization Socialist Related. As a member of these organizations, he published a report on the situation in Burma with the delegate Roland Blum. He also campaigned to obtain information about the disappearance of Chadian politician and opposition leader Ibni Oumar Mahamat Saleh.

Gorce was elected senator of Nièvre in September 2011 with 56.35% of the vote.

In 2011, denouncing the lack of preparation of the Socialist Party program, he decided not to join the campaign team of candidate François Hollande.

In 2014, he chaired the joint information mission "New role and new strategy for the European Union in global Internet governance".

In 2015, he was co-rapporteur of the fact-finding mission “Relations with Russia: how to break the deadlock?".

In 2016, he co-chaired the working group on the refugee crisis.

He was a member of Arnaud Montebourg's campaign team for the 2017 citizen primary. After the victory of Benoît Hamon, Gorce was appointed thematic manager of his presidential campaign.

Gorce was a candidate in the 2017 legislative elections in the first constituency of Nièvre, ultimately finishing third. After the loss, he announced his withdrawal from municipal and parliamentary life, and decided not to enter in the senatorial elections of the same year. In October 2018, he left the PS and joined the Republican and Socialist Left Party, created by Marie-Noëlle Lienemann and Emmanuel Maurel, where he led "Our Common Causes."

== Member of Cnil ==
Between 2011 and 2016, Gorce was a member of the National Commission for Information and Liberties (Cnil). He received compensation for this even though article 4 of ordinance n° 58-1210 prohibits such action. As a member of Cnil, he was behind a bill to ban "comfort biometrics" and a parliamentary report concerning open data from the perspective of personal data protection and the right to privacy.
