= Canton of Cosne-Cours-sur-Loire =

Coordinates: 47.41°N 2.93°E

The canton of Cosne-Cours-sur-Loire is an administrative division of the Nièvre department, central France. It was created at the French canton reorganisation which came into effect in March 2015. Its seat is in Cosne-Cours-sur-Loire.

It consists of the following communes:

1. Alligny-Cosne
2. La Celle-sur-Loire
3. Cosne-Cours-sur-Loire
4. Myennes
5. Pougny
6. Saint-Loup-des-Bois
7. Saint-Père
