= Didier Boulaud =

French politician

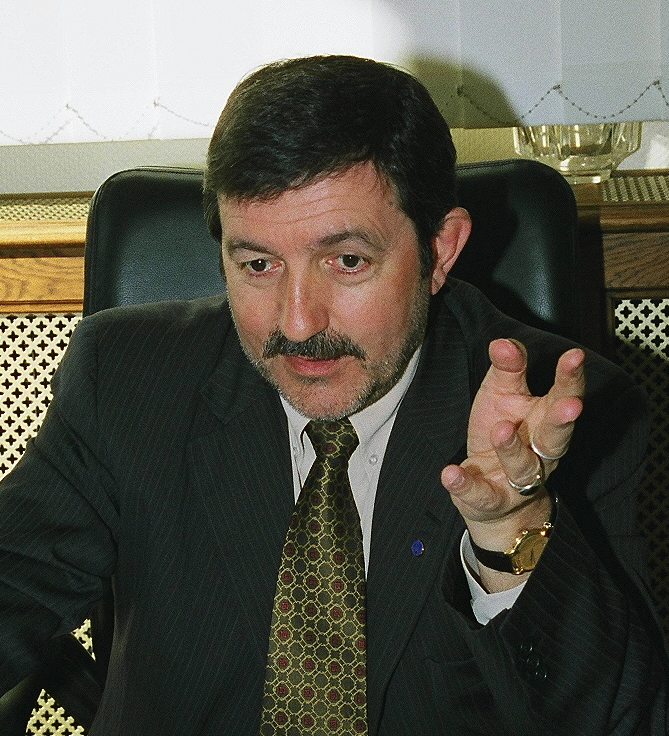
Didier Boulaud

Didier Boulaud (French pronunciation: [didje bulo]; born 4 September 1950, in Yzeure) is a former member of the Senate of France. He represented the Nièvre department as a member of the Socialist Party.

Boulaud was first elected to the Senate on 23 September 2001. He was re-elected on 24 September 2011. He resigned his seat on 30 September 2012.
