= Perrine Goulet =

French politician (born 1978)

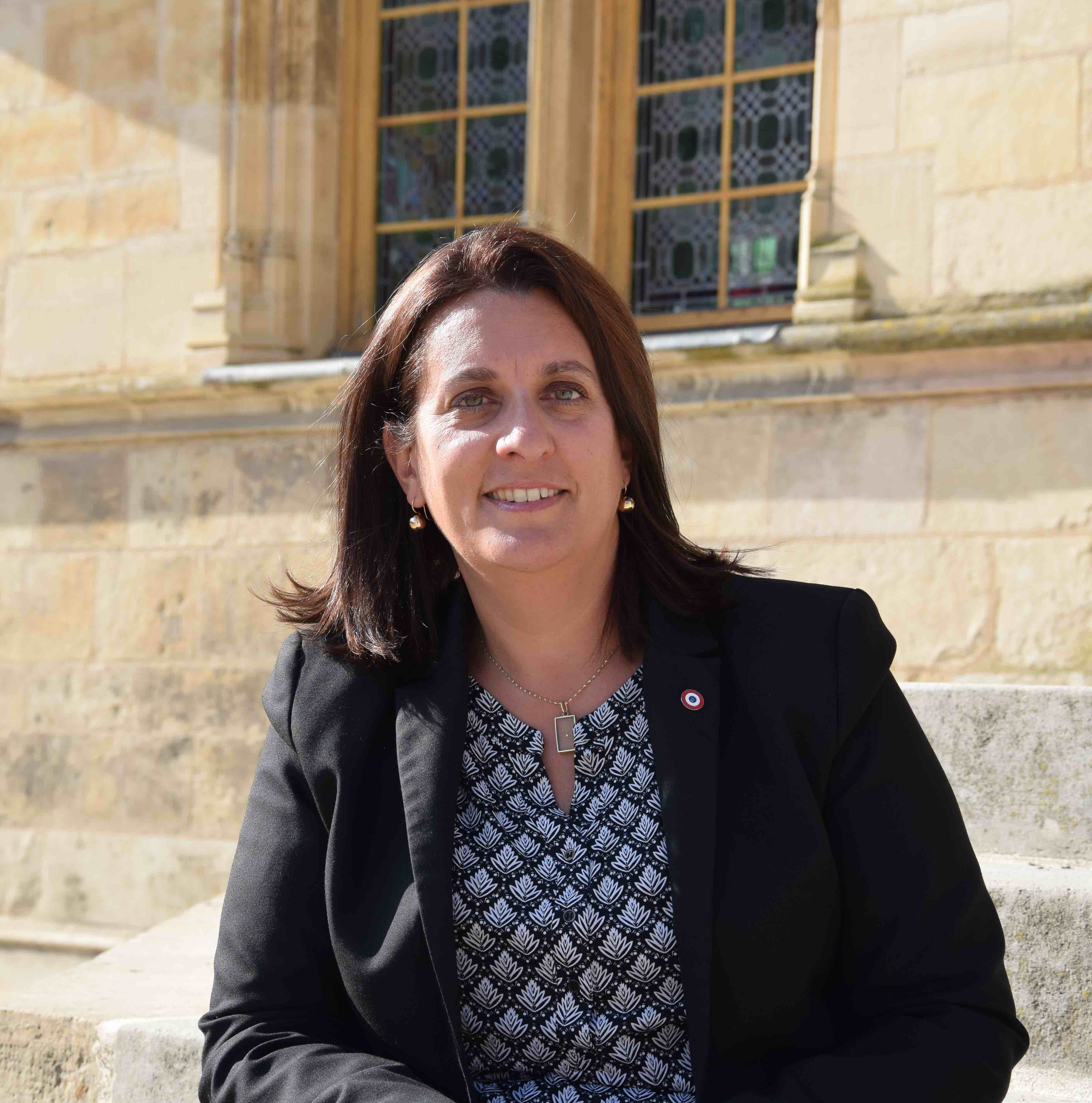

Member of the National Assembly for Nièvre's 1st constituency
- Incumbent
- Assumed office 21 June 2017
- Preceded by: Martine Carrillon-Couvreur

Personal details
- Born: 19 March 1978 (age 48) Nevers, France
- Party: La République En Marche! (2017–2020); Democratic Movement (2020–present)

Perrine Goulet (French pronunciation: [pɛʁin ɡulɛ]; born 19 March 1978) is a French politician who has represented the 1st constituency of the Nièvre department in the National Assembly since 2017. A former member of La République En Marche! (LREM), she joined the Democratic Movement (MoDem) in 2020.

== Political career ==
In parliament, Goulet served on the Finance Committee from 2017 until 2020 before moving to the Committee on Social Affairs. In addition to her committee assignments, she is a member of the French-Israeli Parliamentary Friendship Group.

In September 2018, following the appointment of François de Rugy to the government, Goulet announced her candidacy to succeed him as president of the National Assembly; the position instead went to Richard Ferrand. She later endorsed Amélie de Montchalin as a candidate to succeed him as chairman of the LREM parliamentary group; instead, the position went to Gilles Le Gendre. In July 2019, she challenged Le Gendre for the group's leadership; Le Gendre was subsequently re-elected in the first round, with Goulet coming in fourth out of seven candidates.

In late 2020, Goulet left the LREM group and instead joined the MoDem group.

== Political positions ==
In July 2019, Goulet decided not to align with her parliamentary group's majority and became one of 52 LREM members who abstained from a vote on the French ratification of the European Union’s Comprehensive Economic and Trade Agreement (CETA) with Canada.

== Other activities ==
- Radioprotection and Nuclear Safety Institute (IRSN), Member of the Supervisory Board

== See also ==
- 2017 French legislative election
