= Christian Paul =

French politician

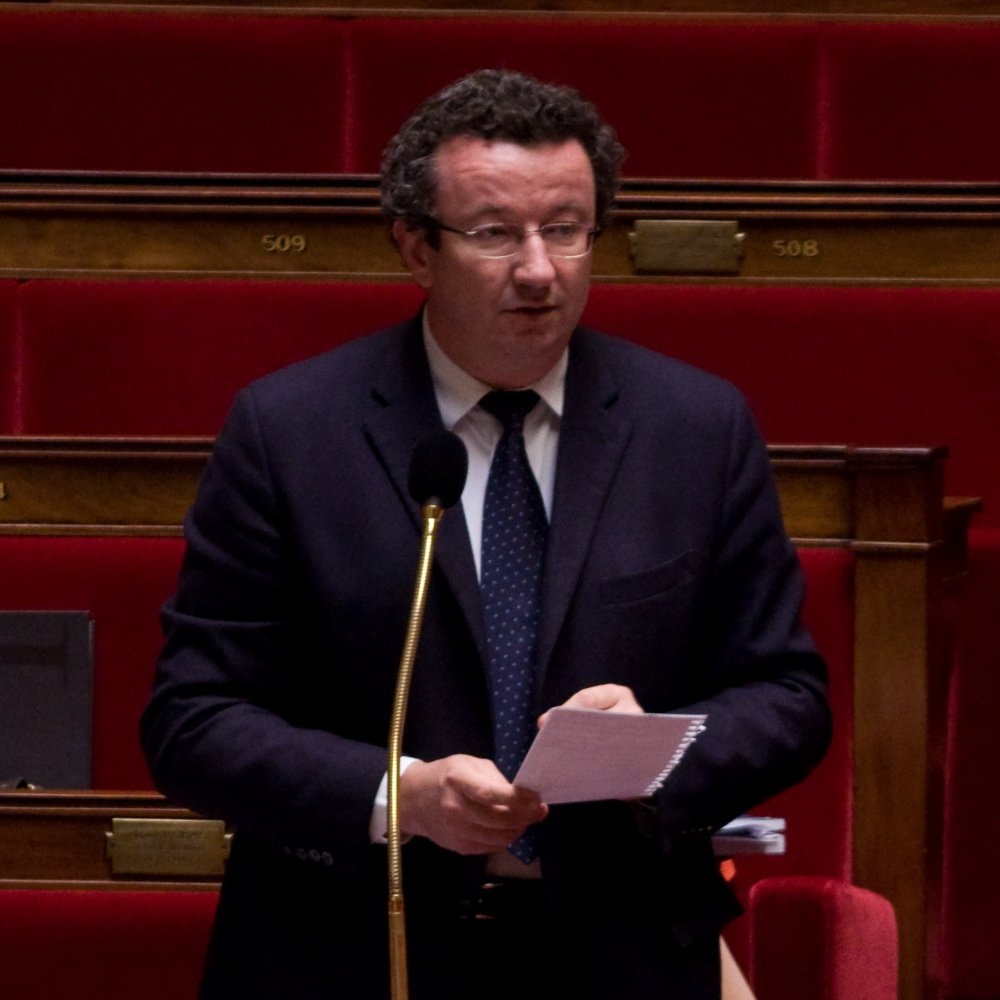

Member of the French National Assembly for Nièvre
- In office 1997–2012
- Succeeded by: constituency abolished
- Constituency: Nièvre's 3rd constituency
- In office 2012–2017
- Preceded by: Gaëtan Gorce
- Succeeded by: Patrice Perrot
- Constituency: Nièvre's 2nd constituency

Personal details
- Born: 23 March 1960 (age 66) Clermont-Ferrand, France
- Party: Socialist Party
- Education: Sciences Po, ÉNA

Christian Paul (French pronunciation: [kʁistjɑ̃ pɔl]; born 23 March 1960) is a French Socialist politician.

He was one of the founding members of the Nouveau Parti Socialiste (New Socialist Party). Along with Arnaud Montebourg, he left this party to create a new movement within the Socialist party called "Rénover Maintenant" ("Renew Now").

== Political Offices ==
- Deputy for Nièvre in the National Assembly, 3rd constituency from 1997 until its abolition in 2012, then the 2nd, which took over most of the 3rds territory from 2012 to 2017. He was defeated in the 2nd round of the 2017 election by REM's Patrice Perrot.
- President of the Parc Régional du Morvan in Morvan, France.

== Publications ==
- Le défi numérique des territoires, Éditions Autrement, 2007.
- Pour la République européenne, in collaboration with Stéphane Collignon, 2008.
