= Saint-Père, Nièvre =

Saint-Père
- Commune
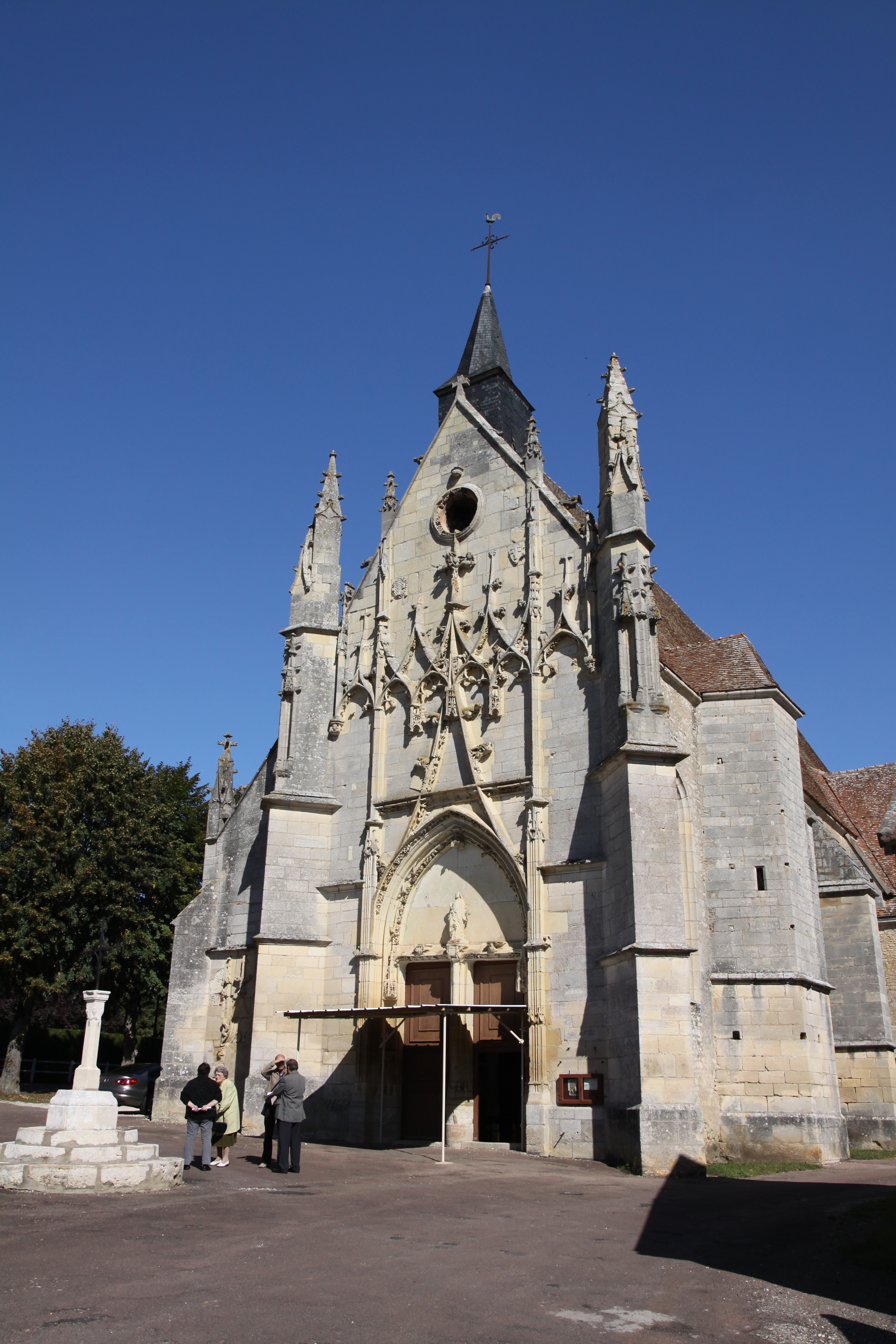
- The church in Saint-Père
- Location of Saint-Père
- Location within France Location within Bourgogne-Franche-Comté
- Coordinates: 47°24′45″N 2°57′39″E
- Country: France
- Region: Bourgogne-Franche-Comté
- Department: Nièvre
- Arrondissement: Cosne-Cours-sur-Loire
- Canton: Cosne-Cours-sur-Loire

Government
  - Mayor (2020–2026): Jocelyne Vernaux
- Area^{1}: 17.09 km^{2} (6.60 sq mi)
- Highest elevation: 248 m (814 ft)
- Lowest elevation: 145 m (476 ft)
- Population (2023): 1,056
  - Density: 61.79/km^{2} (160.0/sq mi)
- Time zone: UTC+01:00 (CET)
  - Summer (DST): UTC+02:00 (CEST)
- INSEE/Postal code: 58261 /58200
- ^{1} French Land Register data, which excludes lakes, ponds, glaciers > 1 km^{2} (0.386 sq mi or 247 acres) and river estuaries.

Saint-Père (French pronunciation: [sɛ̃ pɛʁ]) is a commune in the Nièvre department in central France.

== See also ==
- Communes of the Nièvre department
