= Pougny, Nièvre =

Pougny
- Commune
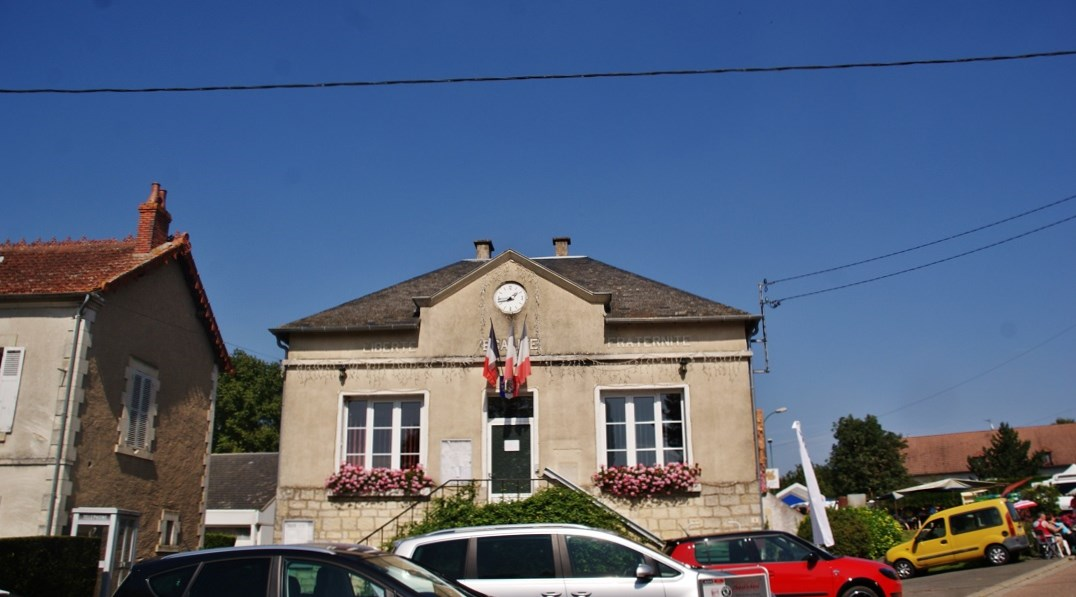
- The town hall in Pougny
- Location of Pougny
- Location within France Location within Bourgogne-Franche-Comté
- Coordinates: 47°23′05″N 3°00′14″E
- Country: France
- Region: Bourgogne-Franche-Comté
- Department: Nièvre
- Arrondissement: Cosne-Cours-sur-Loire
- Canton: Cosne-Cours-sur-Loire

Government
  - Mayor (2020–2026): Thierry Beauvais
- Area^{1}: 19.19 km^{2} (7.41 sq mi)
- Highest elevation: 252 m (827 ft)
- Lowest elevation: 160 m (520 ft)
- Population (2023): 473
  - Density: 24.6/km^{2} (63.8/sq mi)
- Time zone: UTC+01:00 (CET)
  - Summer (DST): UTC+02:00 (CEST)
- INSEE/Postal code: 58213 /58200
- ^{1} French Land Register data, which excludes lakes, ponds, glaciers > 1 km^{2} (0.386 sq mi or 247 acres) and river estuaries.

Pougny (French pronunciation: [puɲi]) is a commune in the Nièvre department in central France.

== See also ==
- Communes of the Nièvre department
