= Patrice Perrot =

French politician

Member of the National Assembly for Nièvre's 2nd constituency
- In office 21 June 2017 – 9 June 2024
- Preceded by: Christian Paul

Personal details
- Born: 24 February 1964 (age 61); Decize, France
- Political party: Renaissance

Patrice Perrot (born 24 February 1964 in Decize) is a French entrepreneur and politician of La République En Marche! (LREM) and Territories of Progress (TDP) who has been serving as a member of the French National Assembly from 2017 to 2024, representing the department of Nièvre. He represents Nièvre's 2nd constituency.

== Political career ==
In parliament, Perrot serves on the Committee on Sustainable Development and Spatial Planning.

In July 2019, Perrot decided not to align with his parliamentary group's majority and became one of 52 LREM members who abstained from a vote on the French ratification of the European Union’s Comprehensive Economic and Trade Agreement (CETA) with Canada.

He was re-elected in the 2022 elections. He declined to run in the election of 2024 citing health issues.

== See also ==
- 2017 French legislative election
- 2022 French legislative election
