= Anna Hashimoto =

British clarinettist (born 1989)

- Born: 1 June 1989 (age 37); Japan
- Education: Royal Academy of Music
- Occupation: Clarinetist
- Website: www.annahashimoto.com

Anna Hashimoto (born 1 June 1989) is a British clarinettist who was born in Japan. At the age of 15, she made her London Concerto debut with the English Chamber Orchestra at the Barbican Centre. Anna is a Vandoren UK artist and is represented by Nippon Artists Management Inc. for Japanese engagements. She performs on a Peter Eaton Clarinet and Basset Clarinet who list her as a "Gifted young soloist".

== Biography ==
Hashimoto was born in Japan but moved to the UK when she was six months old. She attended the Junior Department of the Royal College of Music before starting at the Purcell School where she studied with Michael Collins who then continued to teach her at the Royal Academy of Music. Whilst she was at the Academy, Anna was awarded the Associated Board Scholarship amongst several other prizes including the Leverhulme Scholarship, Buffet Crampon Clarinet Prize, and Regency Award on graduation. After completion of her studies, she was awarded a Meaker Fellowship in 2011 and then in 2014, she was made an Associate of the Royal Academy of Music. She was the winner of the International Clarinet Competitions in Kortrijk (Belgium) in 2010, in Carlino (Italy) in 2009, and the Young Clarinettists Competition in Tokyo in 2003. She has played concertos with orchestras such as the English Chamber Orchestra, Brussels Philharmonic Orchestra, Filharmonie Hradec Kralove, Japan Philharmonic, New Japan Philharmonic, Nagoya Philharmonic, and the Chamber Orchestra of the NHK Symphony. Anna has been broadcast on NHK TV and FM, FM Tokyo, ABC Radio and BBC Radio 3, including BBC Radio3's 'In Tune', NHK-FM's 'Best of Classic' and NHK TV's 'Classic Club' (in a joint recital with Michael Collins).

In addition to her work as a soloist, she is also an active chamber musician and a member of the Atėa Quintet who are Associate Ensemble in Residence at the Birmingham Conservatoire. Anna also has performed chamber music collaborations with artists such as Michael Collins, Leon McCawley and Tsuyoshi Tsutsumi, and string quartets such as Solstice, Alberni, Ciurlonis, Kodály and Prazak Quartets.

As an orchestral player she has been guest principal with the BBC Symphony Orchestra, English Chamber Orchestra, City of Birmingham Symphony Orchestra

== Discography ==
- Touch of France - Anna Hashimoto (cl); Daniel Smith (pn) - Meridian Records CDE 84581
- Premier Prix - Anna Hashimoto (cl); Jacob Barnes (pn) - RAM Records RAM041
- Transcriptions for Strings - Anna Hashimoto (cl); Isis Ensemble, Arranged & Conducted by Jacques Cohen - Meridian Records CDE 84632
