= Château-Chinon (Ville) =

- Subprefecture and commune
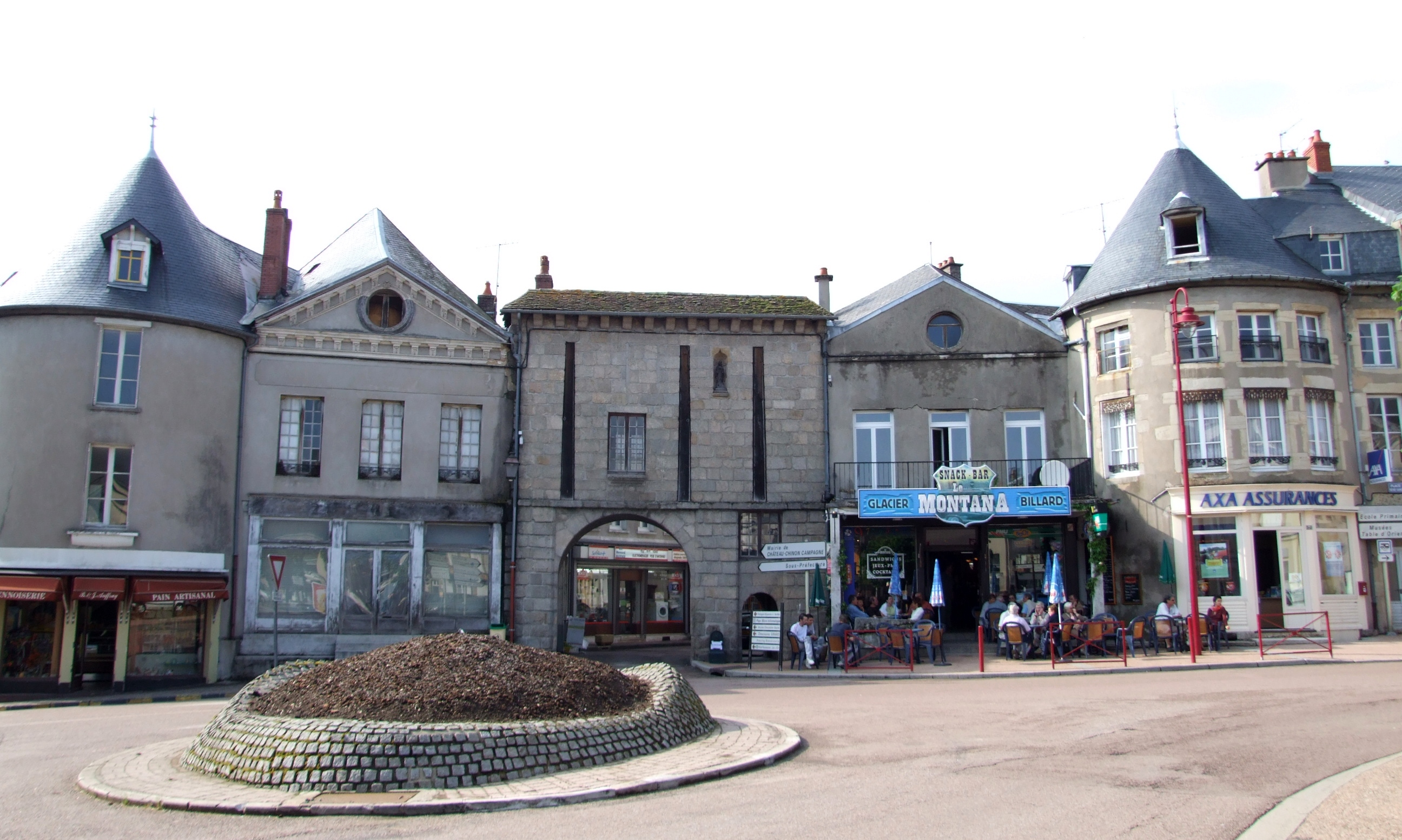
- Porte Notre-Dame

- Coat of arms
- Location of Château-Chinon
- Location within France Location within Bourgogne-Franche-Comté
- Coordinates: 47°03′55″N 3°55′59″E
- Country: France
- Region: Bourgogne-Franche-Comté
- Department: Nièvre
- Arrondissement: Château-Chinon (Ville)
- Canton: Château-Chinon
- Intercommunality: CC Morvan Sommets et Grands Lacs

Government
  - Mayor (2020–2026): Chantal Marie Malus
- Area^{1}: 4.28 km^{2} (1.65 sq mi)
- Elevation: 534 m (1,752 ft)
- Highest elevation: 655 m (2,149 ft)
- Lowest elevation: 337 m (1,106 ft)
- Population (2023): 1,770
  - Density: 414/km^{2} (1,070/sq mi)
- Time zone: UTC+01:00 (CET)
  - Summer (DST): UTC+02:00 (CEST)
- INSEE/Postal code: 58062 /58120
- ^{1} French Land Register data, which excludes lakes, ponds, glaciers > 1 km^{2} (0.386 sq mi or 247 acres) and river estuaries.

Château-Chinon (Ville) (French pronunciation: [ʃɑto ʃinɔ̃ vil]) is a commune in the Nièvre department in France. It is a sub-prefecture of the department. Historically, it was an important medieval Lordship.

The villages around the town are grouped in another commune named Château-Chinon (Campagne).

François Mitterrand (1916–1996), President of France from 1981 to 1995, was the mayor of Château-Chinon from 1959 to 1981.

It is 306 kilometres (190 mi) (by car) southeast of Paris.

== Lordship ==
The Lordship of Château-Chinon was an important seigneury held directly from the king since the time of Charles VI. It comprised five bailiwicks and 195 fiefs. Holders of the Lordship included Charles the Bold and Maximilian of Habsburg. The Lordship was also held by a number of prominent families including the Houses of Bourbon, Longueville and Savoy-Carignan.

== Twin towns ==
- Cortona, Italy
- Timbuktu, Mali
- Villeréal, France

== Climate ==
Climate data for Chateau-Chinon, elevation: 598 m (1,962 ft) (1991-2020 normals, extremes 1934-present)
| Month | Jan | Feb | Mar | Apr | May | Jun | Jul | Aug | Sep | Oct | Nov | Dec | Year |
|---|---|---|---|---|---|---|---|---|---|---|---|---|---|
| Record high °C (°F) | 18.9 (66.0) | 20.8 (69.4) | 24.4 (75.9) | 27.3 (81.1) | 32.4 (90.3) | 36.5 (97.7) | 38.8 (101.8) | 38.0 (100.4) | 33.7 (92.7) | 28.6 (83.5) | 22.7 (72.9) | 20.1 (68.2) | 38.8 (101.8) |
| Mean daily maximum °C (°F) | 5.2 (41.4) | 6.2 (43.2) | 10.4 (50.7) | 14.1 (57.4) | 17.9 (64.2) | 21.5 (70.7) | 23.6 (74.5) | 23.6 (74.5) | 19.3 (66.7) | 14.5 (58.1) | 8.9 (48.0) | 5.9 (42.6) | 14.3 (57.7) |
| Daily mean °C (°F) | 2.7 (36.9) | 3.2 (37.8) | 6.7 (44.1) | 9.7 (49.5) | 13.3 (55.9) | 16.7 (62.1) | 18.7 (65.7) | 18.8 (65.8) | 15.0 (59.0) | 11.2 (52.2) | 6.2 (43.2) | 3.5 (38.3) | 10.5 (50.9) |
| Mean daily minimum °C (°F) | 0.2 (32.4) | 0.2 (32.4) | 2.9 (37.2) | 5.3 (41.5) | 8.7 (47.7) | 11.9 (53.4) | 13.8 (56.8) | 14.0 (57.2) | 10.8 (51.4) | 7.9 (46.2) | 3.5 (38.3) | 1.1 (34.0) | 6.7 (44.1) |
| Record low °C (°F) | −19.9 (−3.8) | −21.3 (−6.3) | −14.0 (6.8) | −7.9 (17.8) | −3.5 (25.7) | 1.2 (34.2) | 5.0 (41.0) | 4.8 (40.6) | 1.4 (34.5) | −4.0 (24.8) | −9.9 (14.2) | −15.6 (3.9) | −21.3 (−6.3) |
| Average precipitation mm (inches) | 119.6 (4.71) | 95.4 (3.76) | 92.2 (3.63) | 94.5 (3.72) | 108.3 (4.26) | 90.5 (3.56) | 93.7 (3.69) | 90.7 (3.57) | 94.2 (3.71) | 113.5 (4.47) | 129.5 (5.10) | 130.2 (5.13) | 1,252.3 (49.30) |
| Average precipitation days (≥ 1.0 mm) | 13.9 | 12.4 | 11.5 | 12.1 | 12.6 | 10.1 | 10.6 | 9.8 | 10.5 | 12.8 | 14.5 | 15.1 | 145.9 |
| Mean monthly sunshine hours | 68.5 | 90.8 | 147.2 | 171.7 | 214.9 | 230.8 | 250.9 | 215.3 | 183.7 | 149.3 | 71.6 | 59.0 | 1,853.7 |
Source 1: Meteociel
Source 2: Infoclimat (sunshine hours)

== See also ==
- Communes of the Nièvre department
- Parc naturel régional du Morvan
