= Julien Guibert =

French politician (born 1984)

Member of the French National Assembly for Nièvre's 2nd constituency
- Incumbent
- Assumed office 18 July 2024
- Preceded by: Patrice Perrot

Personal details
- Born: 11 May 1984 (age 41) Clamecy, France
- Party: National Rally

Julien Guibert (French pronunciation: [ʒyljɛ̃ ɡibɛʁ]; born 11 May 1984) is a French politician of the National Rally who was elected member of the National Assembly for Nièvre's 2nd constituency in 2024. He is also a member of the municipal council of Clamecy, the council of Haut Nivernais-Val d'Yonne, and the Regional Council of Bourgogne-Franche-Comté. He serves as vice president of the National Rally in the regional council, and as departmental secretary of the party. In the 2022 legislative election, he unsuccessfully contested Nièvre's 2nd constituency.
