= Nièvre =

Department of France

- Department of France
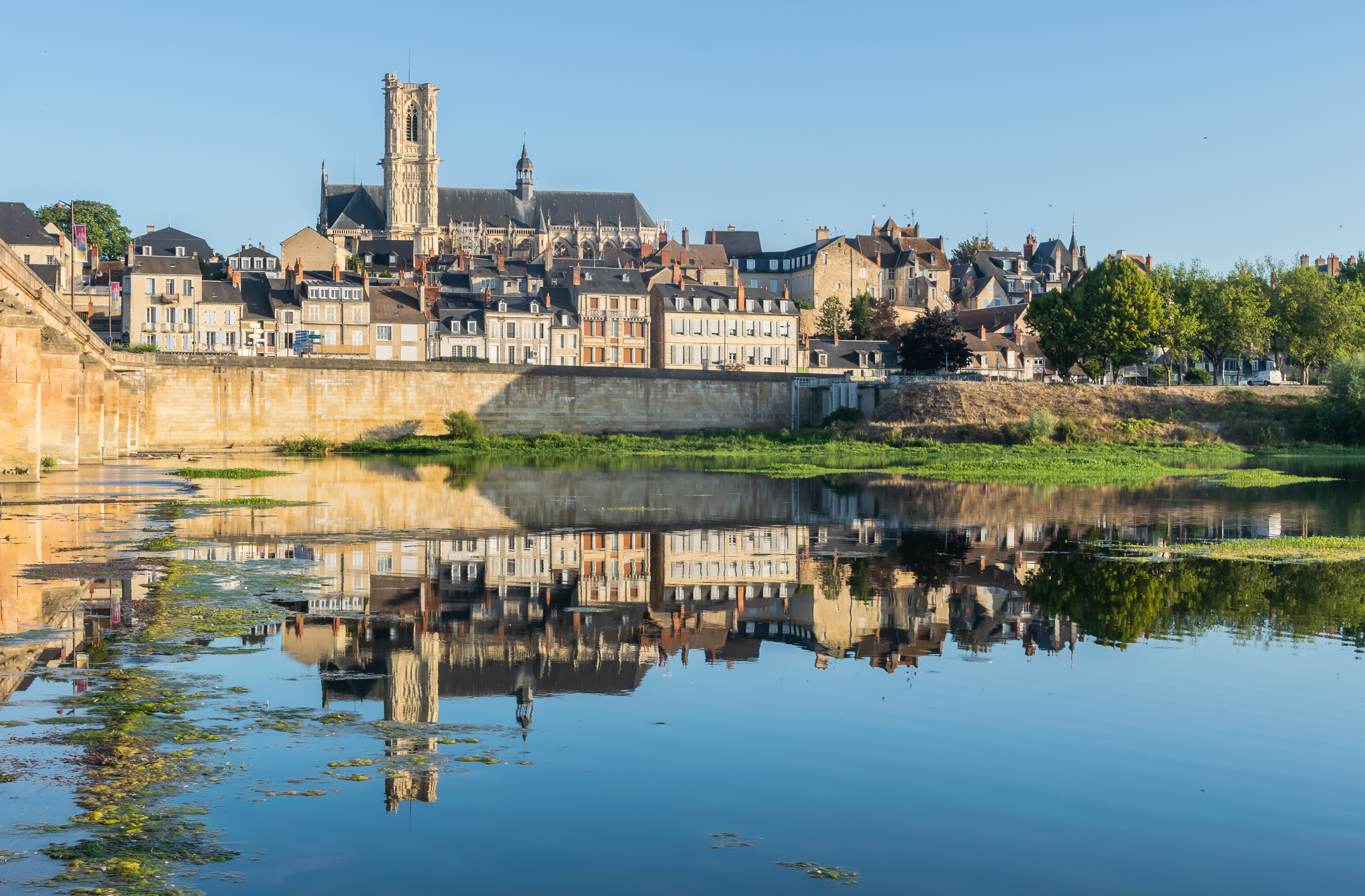
- A view of the prefecture of the Nièvre department, the city of Nevers, on the river Loire, with Nevers Cathedral in the background

- Coat of arms

- Location of Nièvre in France
- Coordinates: 47°05′N 03°30′E
- Country: France
- Region: Bourgogne-Franche-Comté
- Prefecture: Nevers
- Subprefectures: Château-Chinon; Clamecy; Cosne-Cours-sur-Loire

Government
  - President of the Departmental Council: Fabien Bazin (PS)

Area^{1}
  - Total: 6,817 km^{2} (2,632 sq mi)

Population (2023)
  - Total: 201,417
  - Rank: 89th
  - Density: 29.55/km^{2} (76.52/sq mi)
- Time zone: UTC+1 (CET)
  - Summer (DST): UTC+2 (CEST)
- ISO 3166 code: FR-58
- Department number: 58
- Arrondissements: 4
- Cantons: 17
- Communes: 309
- ^1 French Land Register data, which exclude estuaries and lakes, ponds and glaciers larger than 1 km^{2}.

Nièvre (French: [njɛvʁ]) is a department in the Bourgogne-Franche-Comté region, central-east France. Named after the river Nièvre, it had a population of 201,417 in 2023. Its prefecture is Nevers.

Covering an area 6,817 square kilometres (2,632 sq mi), Nièvre is landlocked between six other departments: Yonne to the north, Côte-d'Or to the east, Saône-et-Loire to the southeast, Allier to the south, Cher to the west and Loiret to the northwest.

== History ==
Nièvre is one of the original 83 departments created during the French Revolution on 4 March 1790. It was created from the former province of Nivernais.

== Geography ==
Nièvre is part of the current region of Bourgogne-Franche-Comté, although historically it was not part of the province of Burgundy.

The department is crossed by the river Loire, the longest river in France. Industry developed around cast iron foundries using the ample supply of wood then available. Coal mining also developed during the Middle Ages around Decize and continued until the last mine closed in 1974. Forestry is now an important provider of employment. Tourists are attracted by the numerous historic sites. The Canal du Nivernais is popular with houseboating enthusiasts.

== Demographics ==
Nièvre is a rural department with about 30 inhabitants per km^{2}. Only one commune (Nevers) has more than 10,000 inhabitants. It indicates the characteristic of the department, which is predominantly rural. The department is slowly losing its population since the 1970s, at the rate of 900 people a year. Abandoned houses can be seen in villages and the price of peripheral real estate is one of the lowest in France.

Population development since 1801:

Historical population

Year	Pop.	±% p.a.
1801	232,590	—
1806	241,739	+0.77%
1821	257,990	+0.43%
1831	282,521	+0.91%
1841	305,346	+0.78%
1851	327,161	+0.69%
1861	332,814	+0.17%
1872	339,917	+0.19%
1881	347,576	+0.25%
1891	343,576	−0.12%
1901	323,783	−0.59%
1911	299,312	−0.78%
1921	270,148	−1.02%
1931	255,195	−0.57%

Year	Pop.	±% p.a.
1936	249,673	−0.44%
1946	248,559	−0.04%
1954	240,078	−0.43%
1962	245,921	+0.30%
1968	247,702	+0.12%
1975	245,212	−0.14%
1982	239,635	−0.33%
1990	233,278	−0.34%
1999	225,198	−0.39%
2007	221,488	−0.21%
2012	216,786	−0.43%
2017	207,182	−0.90%
2023	201,417	−0.47%

=== Principal towns ===
The most populous commune is Nevers, the prefecture. As of 2023, there are 5 communes with more than 4,000 inhabitants:

Commune	Population (2023)
Nevers	33,085
Cosne-Cours-sur-Loire	9,733
Varennes-Vauzelles	9,146
Decize	4,932
La Charité-sur-Loire	4,705

== Wines ==
Nièvre is also well known for its white wine, Pouilly Fumé. The vineyards are scattered around villages including Pouilly-sur-Loire, which lends its name to the appellation, Tracy-sur-Loire, Boisgibault and Saint-Andelain. The word fumé is French for "smoky", and it is said the name comes from the smoky or flinty quality of these wines. The only grape allowed in the Pouilly-Fumé AC is Sauvignon blanc, which produces wines that are generally crisp, tart, and somewhat grassy. There is also a confidential production of red pinot noir wine near La Charité sur Loire.

== Politics ==
The President of the Departmental Council is Socialist Fabien Bazin, elected in July 2021. The Departmental Council of Nièvre has 34 seats. The left-wing coalition led by the Socialist Party has 20 seats.

Nièvre is traditionally a left-wing department. The results of the second round of voting in presidential elections reflect this consistently:

- In the 2007 presidential election, Ségolène Royal received 52.91% of the department's votes, as against a national per centage of just 46.94%.
- In the 1995 presidential election, Lionel Jospin received 57.07% of the department's votes, as against a national per centage of just 47.36%.
- In the 1981 presidential election, François Mitterrand received 62.91% of the department's votes, as against a national per centage of 51.76%.

This historical tendency has been recently and dramatically reversed as the far-right Front National party has come out ahead in all the elections since 2015. In the 2017 and 2022 presidential elections, Marine le Pen won most votes in the first rounds. However the two députés of the department belong to République En Marche, the party of Emmanuel Macron.

Nièvre's best-known political representative was François Mitterrand who served as a senator and a deputy for the department, as well as mayor of Château-Chinon for 22 years before his election to the presidency of France in 1981.

=== Representation in Parliament ===
==== National Assembly ====
Constituency	Member	Party
Nièvre's 1st constituency	Perrine Goulet	MoDem
Nièvre's 2nd constituency	Julien Guibert	National Rally

==== Senate ====
In the 2017 Senate election, Nièvre elected Patrice Joly (Socialist Party) and Nadia Sollogoub (miscellaneous right) to the Senate.

== Tourism ==
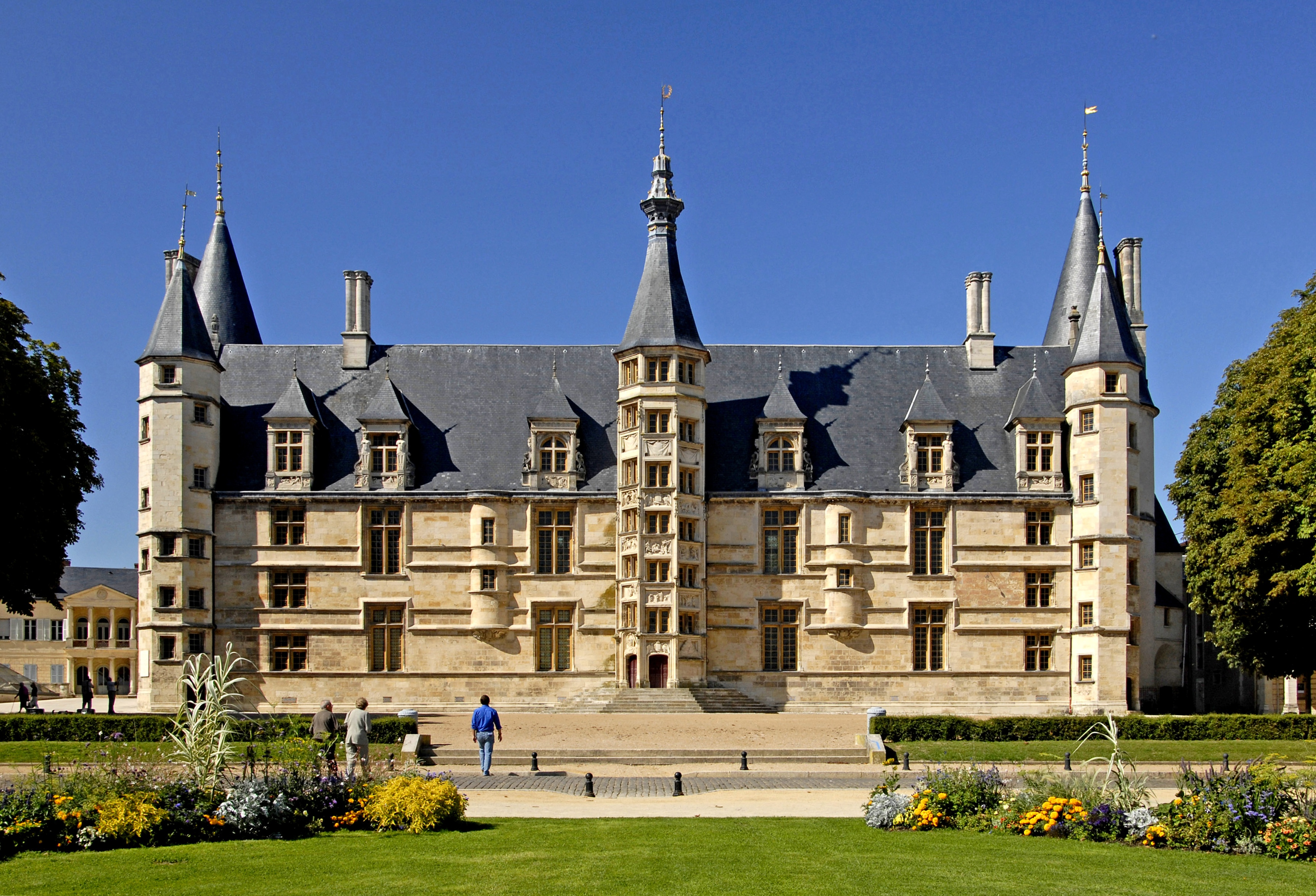
Ducal Palace in Nevers

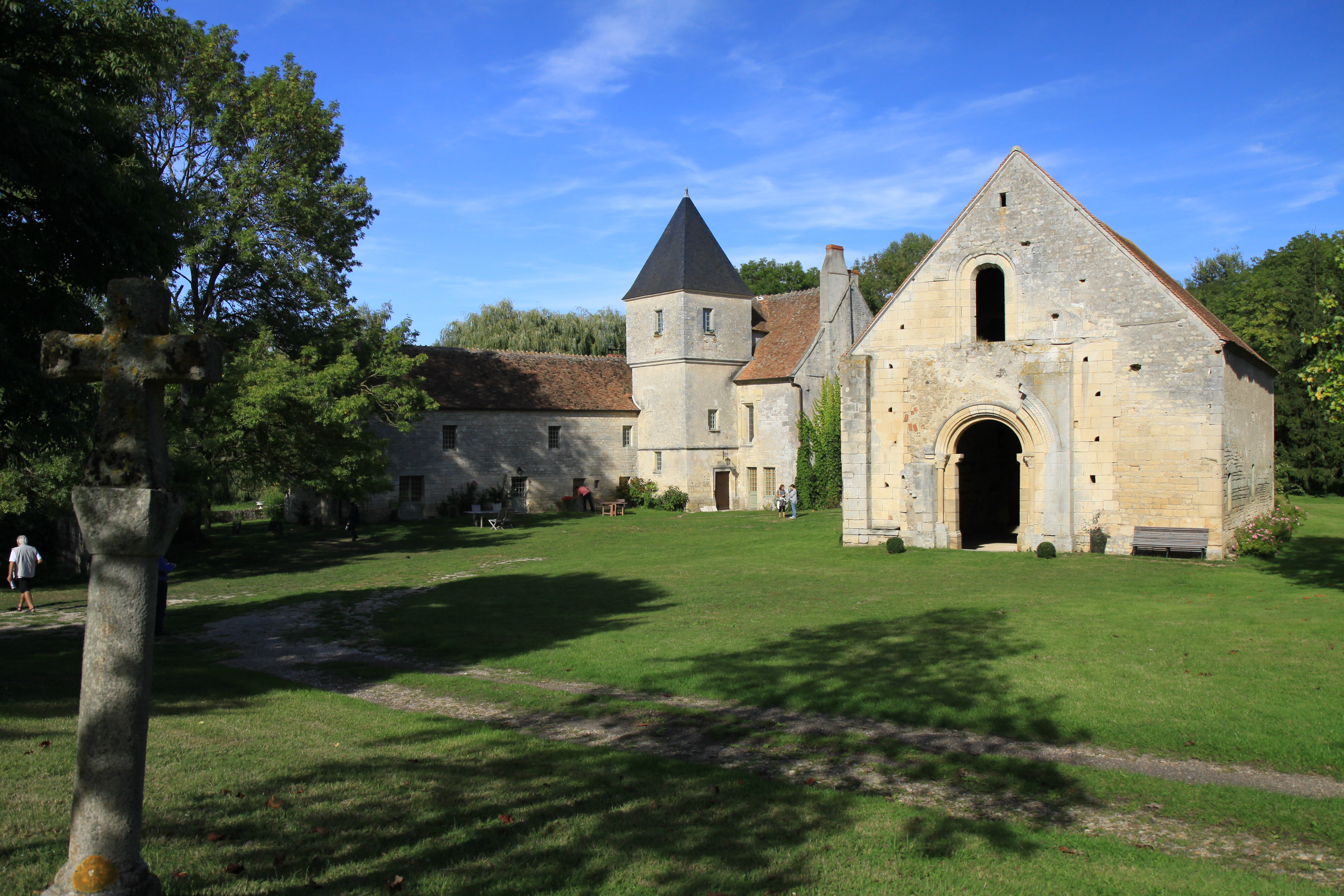
Commandry of the Knights Templar in Villemoison

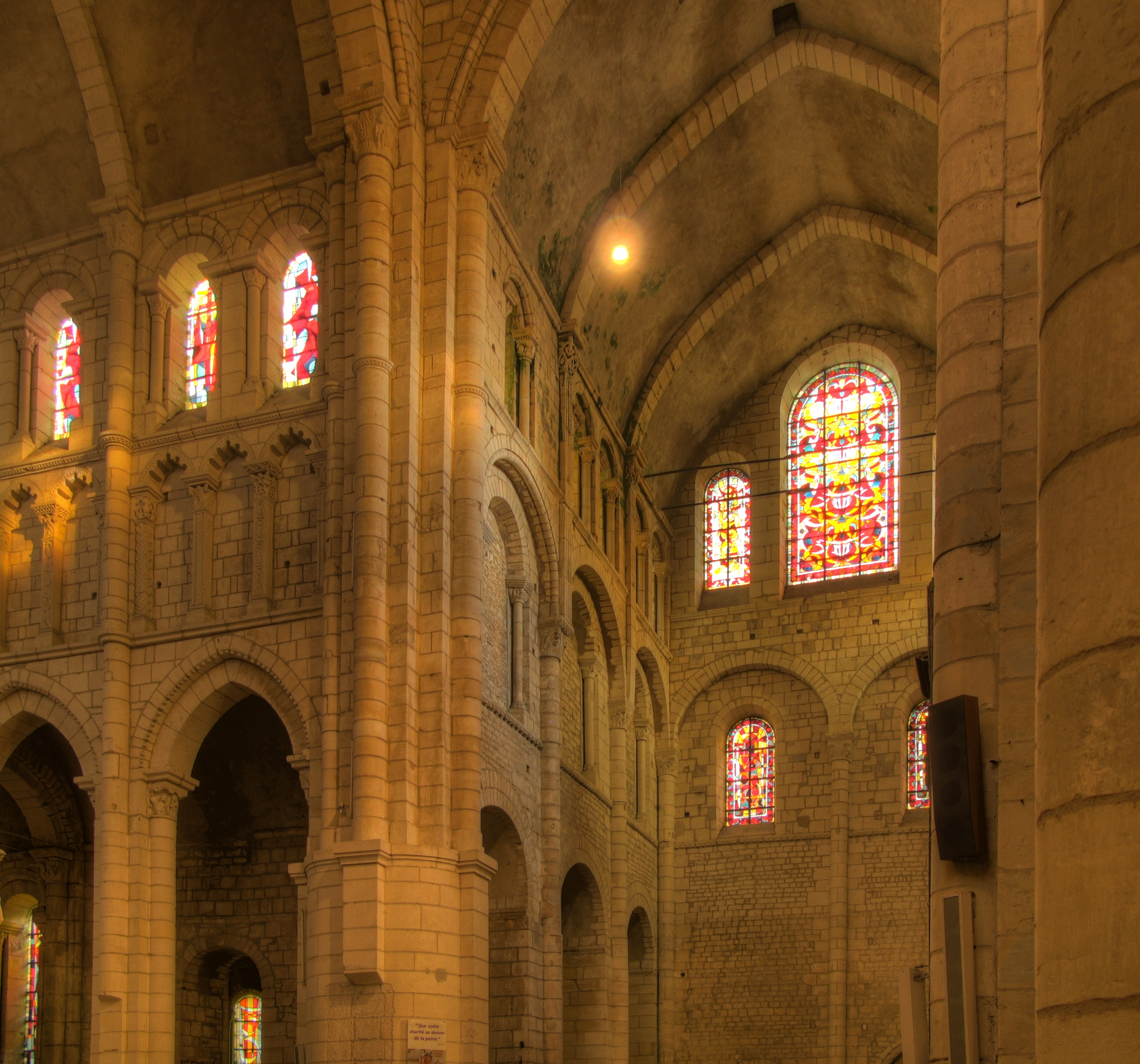
Notre-Dame of La Charité-sur-Loire

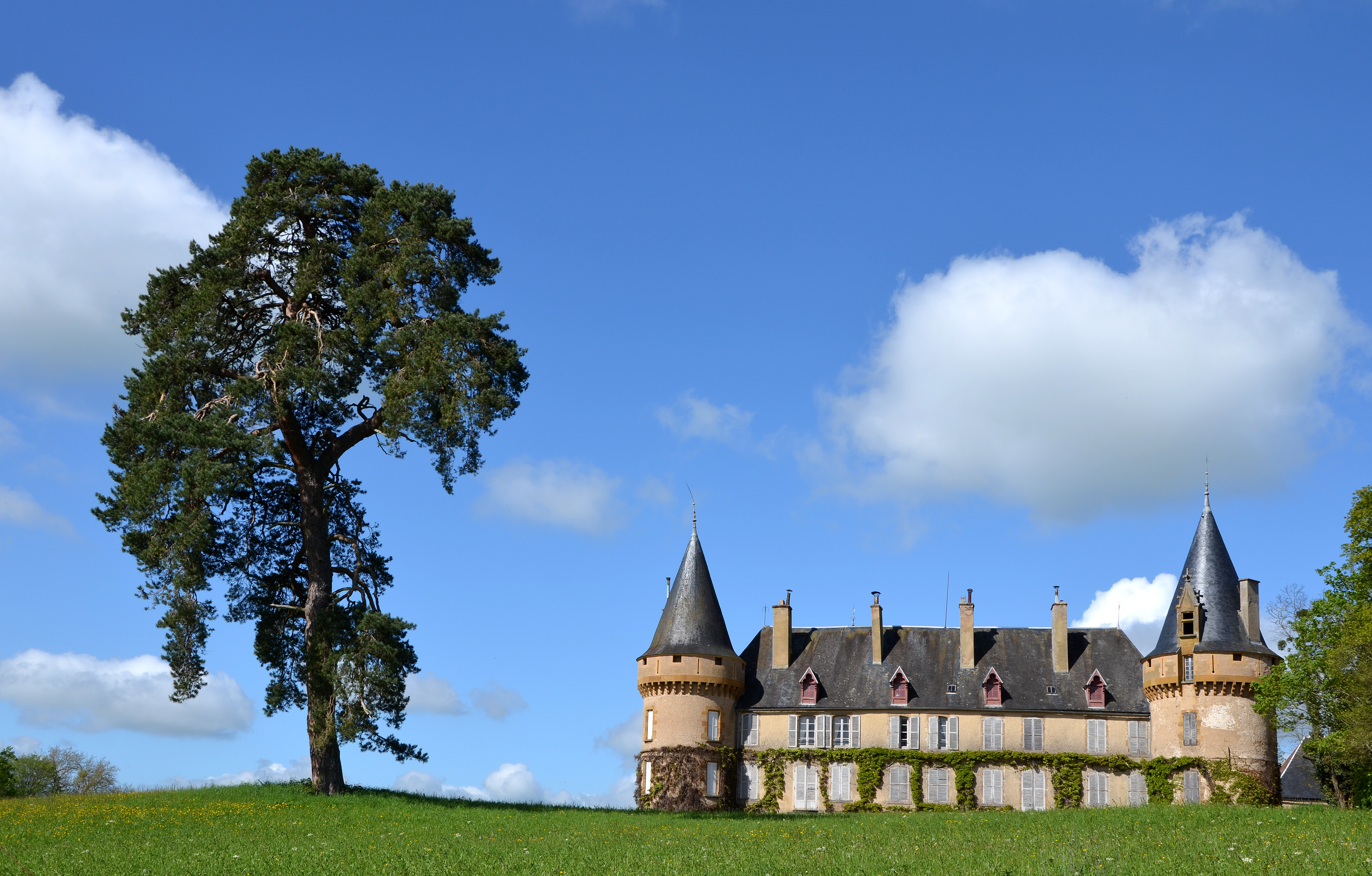
Château de Villemolin

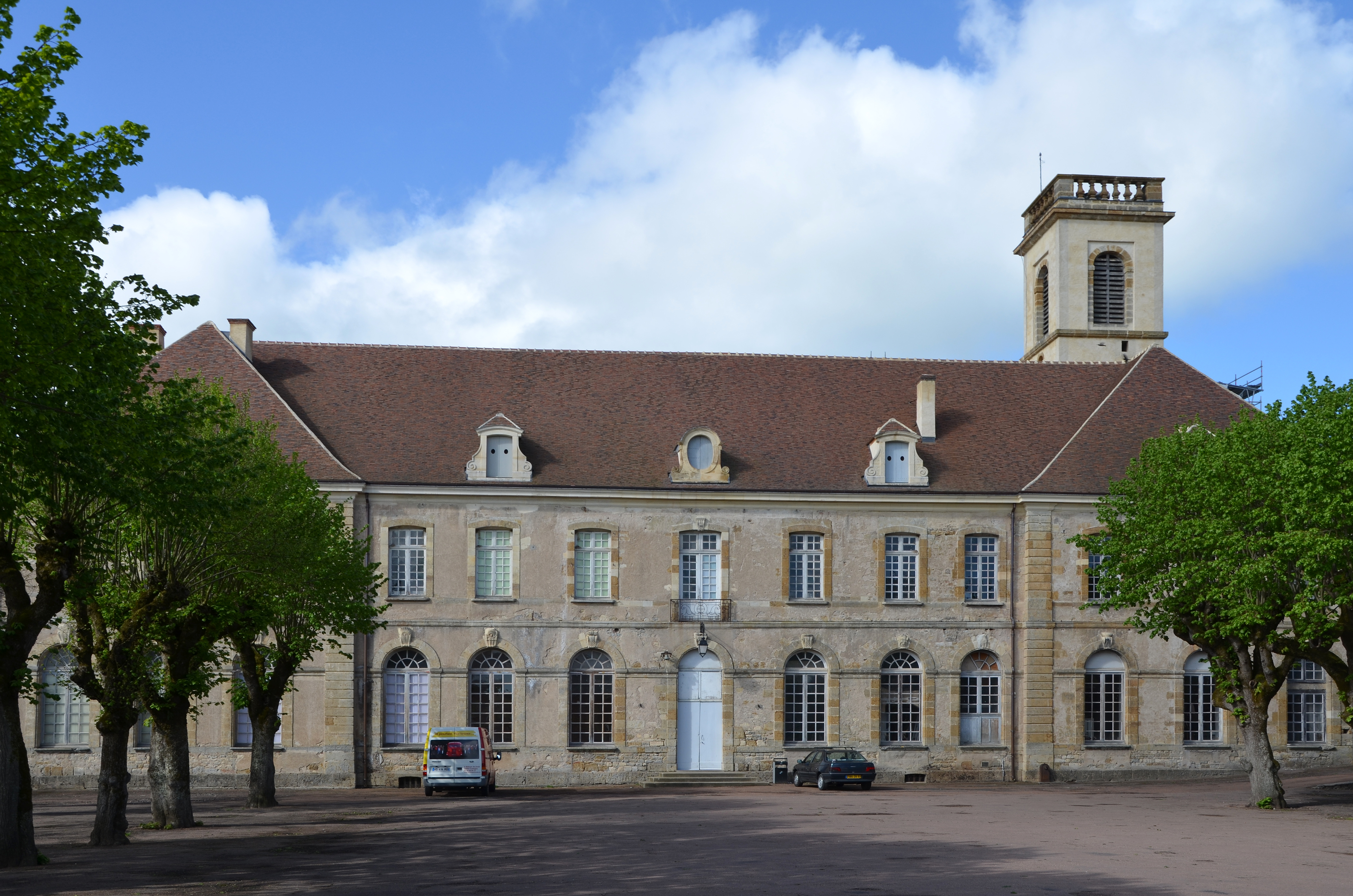
Abbey of Corbigny

== Sport ==
The Circuit de Nevers Magny-Cours hosted the Formula One French Grand Prix from 1991 to 2008, the Bol d'Or from 2000 to 2014, and the French round of the Superbike World Championship since 2003. USO Nevers is a professional rugby team that plays in Rugby Pro D2.

== See also ==
- Cantons of the Nièvre department
- Communes of the Nièvre department
- Arrondissements of the Nièvre department
- Parc naturel régional du Morvan
