= Deaths in April 1987 =

The following is a list of notable deaths in April 1987.

Entries for each day are listed alphabetically by surname. A typical entry lists information in the following sequence:

- Name, age, country of citizenship at birth, subsequent country of citizenship (if applicable), reason for notability, cause of death (if known), and reference.

== April 1987 ==
=== 1 ===
- Zdeněk Bárta, 95, Czech Olympic fencer (1912).
- Henri Cochet, 85, French tennis player, world number one player.
- Victor D'Amico, 82, American teaching artist, Director of the Department of Education of the Museum of Modern Art.
- James Edward Doyle, 71, American lawyer, United States district judge.
- Oscar Ellis, 77, Chilean footballer.
- Niels Peder Hansen, 85, Danish footballer.
- Edmund Boyd Osler, 67, Canadian politician, member of the House of Commons of Canada (1968–1972).
- Vladimir Popov, 56, Soviet animator and art director.
- Valter Sentimenti, 64, Italian Olympic boxer (1952).

=== 2 ===
- Hans Cattini, 73, Swiss Olympic ice hockey player (1936, 1948).
- Tommy Davis, 52, American NFL footballer (San Francisco 49ers), lung cancer.
- Trevor Hockey, 43, British footballer and Welsh international (Birmingham City, Wales), heart attack.
- Eleanor Leacock, 64, American anthropologist and social theorist, stroke.
- Larry Marley, 41–42, Irish member of the IRA, shot.
- Wang Renmei, 72, Chinese actress and singer, cerebral hemorrhage.
- Buddy Rich, 69, American jazz drummer, songwriter and bandleader, cardiac failure
- Harry Watt, 80, Scottish documentary and feature film director (The Siege of Pinchgut).
- Kansuke Yamamoto, 73, Japanese photographer and poet.

=== 3 ===
- Joe Casey, 86, American baseball player.
- Robert Dalban, 83, French actor.
- Aksel Duun, 66, Danish Olympic sprint canoeist (1956).
- Philip Edwards, 80, English cricketer.
- Anne Grey, 80, English actress.
- Lynda Heaven, 84, Australian politician, member of the Tasmanian House of Assembly (1962–1964).
- Robert Perry, 77, British Olympic sailor (1952, 1956).
- Tom Sestak, 51, American AFL footballer (Buffalo Bills), heart attack.

=== 4 ===
- Gordon Bennetts, 78, Australian cricketer.
- Agyeya, 76, Indian poet, novelist and revolutionary.
- C. L. Moore, 76, American science fiction and fantasy writer.
- Michael Redstone, 84, American entrepreneur, founder of the Northeast Theater Corporation.
- Osman Saleh Sabbe, 54–55, Eritrean-born writer and political activist.
- Phil Stein, 73, Canadian NHL player (Toronto Maple Leafs).
- Le Tari, 40, American film and television actor, heart attack.
- Chögyam Trungpa, 48, Tibetan Buddhist meditation master, cardiac arrest.

=== 5 ===
- George William Bulmer, 88, American-born Canadian WWI flying ace.
- Jack Howe, 71, English international footballer (Derby County, England).
- Leabua Jonathan, 72, Prime Minister of Lesotho, heart attack.
- Jan Lindblad, 54, Swedish naturalist, writer and film maker, kidney failure.
- Tsuneko Nakazato, 77, Japanese novelist, colon cancer.
- Jim White, 67, American NFL footballer (New York Giants).

=== 6 ===
- Vicente Cañas, 47, Spanish Christian missionary, assassinated.
- James G. Donovan, 88, American lawyer and politician, member of U.S. House of Representatives (1951–1957).
- Jean-Baptiste Doumeng, 67, French businessman and communist politician.
- Bud Morse, 82, American MLB player (Philadelphia Athletics).
- Lucia Nifontova, 73, Finnish ballet dancer.
- John Nunn, 81, English cricketer.
- Bob Van Osdel, 77, American Olympic high jumper (1932).
- Henry Lucien de Vries, 77, Surinamese politician and entrepreneur, Governor General of Suriname.

=== 7 ===
- Terry Carr, 50, American science fiction fan, author and editor, heart failure.
- Pick Dehner, 72, American basketball player and coach.
- Will Hindle, 57, American filmmaker of personal 16mm movies, heart attack.
- Charles Hope, 75, British peer and businessman, director of Eagle Star Insurance.
- John Lehmann, 79, English publisher and poet.
- Nick De Noia, 45, American director, screenwriter and choreographer, murdered.
- Noel F. Parrish, 77, American brigadier general in the U.S. Air Force, cardiac arrest.
- Dénes Pataky, 70, Hungarian Olympic figure skater (1936).
- Paul Peek, 82, American attorney and politician, Associate Justice of the Supreme Court of California.
- Walter H. Reynolds, 86, American politician, mayor of Providence, Rhode Island.
- Vladimir Shilykovsky, 54, Soviet Russian Olympic speed skater (1956. 1960).
- Hermann Simon, 80, German Olympic wrestler (1928).
- Maxine Sullivan, 75, American jazz vocalist, seizure.

=== 8 ===
- Tommy Abbott, 52, American actor, dancer and choreographer (West Side Story).
- Terry Allen, 62, English flyweight boxer and World Champion.
- Anni Frind, 87, German lyric soprano.
- Andrei Getman, 83, Soviet military commander, Red Army general.
- Kevin McNamara, 60, Irish Catholic academic, Archbishop of Dublin, cancer.
- Ervin Nyiregyházi, 84, Hungarian-born American pianist and composer, colon cancer.

=== 9 ===
- James Leroy Bondsteel, 39, American soldier in the U.S. Army, Medal of Honor recipient.
- James Bush, 79, American actor.
- Al Dodd, 41, American NFL footballer (New Orleans Saints).
- Doug Jennings, 57, Australian politician.
- Emil M. Mrak, 85, American food scientist and microbiologist, chancellor of the University of California, Davis, heart attack.

=== 10 ===
- Horst Dassler, 51, German businessman, chairman of Adidas, cancer.
- Reg Davies, 77, Australian rules footballer.
- Birgit Dressel, 26. West German heptathlete and Olympian, organ failure.
- Berta Drews, 85, German actress.
- Susy Garland, 20, British Olympic figure skater (1980, 1984).
- Jean Jonlet, 80, Belgian Olympic rower (1928).
- Toar Springstein, 68, Canadian football player (Saskatchewan Roughriders).

=== 11 ===
- Manny S. Brown, 69, American politician, member of the Wisconsin State Assembly (1965–1973).
- Carleton F. Bryant, 94, American Vice Admiral in the U.S. Navy.
- Erskine Caldwell, 83, American novelist and short story writer (Tobacco Road), emphysema and lung cancer.
- Netania Davrath, 55, Ukrainian-born Israeli soprano opera and concert singer.
- George Hart, 85, English cricketer.
- Vasili Kartsev, 67, Soviet Russian football player and coach.
- Rudolf Krause, 80, East German racing driver.
- Primo Levi, 67, Italian chemist, writer and Jewish Holocaust survivor, suicide.
- Frederick Joseph Loftus-Tottenham, 88, Irish-born general in the British Indian Army.
- Bill Morton, 77, American college football player (Dartmouth Big Green).
- Kent Taylor, 79, American film and television actor.
- Hédi Váradi, 57, Hungarian actress.

=== 12 ===
- Mike Von Erich, (Michael Adkisson), 23, American professional wrestler, suicide.
- Jean Hansen, 55, Danish Olympic cyclist (1952).
- René Hardy, 76, French citizen, member of the French Resistance during World War II.
- Clarence Isreal, 69, American baseball player.
- Nick Knott, 66, Canadian ice hockey player (Brooklyn Americans).
- Akram Pahalwan, 57, Pakistani wrestler.
- Hertha von Walther, 83, German film actress.

=== 13 ===
- Dennis Allen, 35, Australian drug dealer, accused murderer, heart failure.
- Herbert Blumer, 87, American sociologist and NFL footballer (Chicago Cardinals).
- Joe Colquhoun, 60, British comics artist (Charley's War), heart attack.
- Jim Considine, 84, Australian rules footballer.
- Daniel E. Conway, 75, American labor union leader.
- Alfred Evans, 73, Welsh politician, Member of Parliament (1968–1979).
- Simha Flapan, 76, Israeli historian and politician.
- Malcolm Ford, 50, Scottish cricketer.
- Jørgen Jensen, 67, Danish trade unionist and politician.
- Gerry McAloon, 70, Scottish footballer (Brentford), hypothermia.
- Philip Pritchard, 54, Australian Olympic field hockey player (1960).
- Guido Sala, 58, Italian Grand Prix motorcycle road racer and world champion kart racer.
- Neal Thompson, 81, Australian rules footballer.

=== 14 ===
- Brian Carlson, 54, Australian international rugby league footballer (North Sydney, Australia).
- Olaf Devik, 100, Norwegian physicist and civil servant.
- Bill Hardman, 86, Australian rugby league footballer.
- Karl Höller, 79, German composer.
- Julius Sumner Miller, 77, American physicist and television personality, leukemia.

=== 15 ===
- Orland K. Armstrong, 93, American journalist and politician, member of the U.S. House of Representatives (1951–1953).
- Hans-Joachim Born, 77, German radiochemist.
- Rachel Burrows, 74, Irish actress and broadcaster.
- Mickey Finn, 35, Irish fiddler.
- Peter Benjamin Graham, 61, Australian visual artist, printer and art theorist.
- John Hoffman, 61, American NFL player (Chicago Bears).
- Adolphe Lefkowitch, 84, American Olympic boxer (1924).
- Louis R. Lowery, 70, American U.S. Marine Corps officer and combat photographer, aplastic anemia.
- Press Maravich, 71, American college and professional basketball coach, prostate cancer.
- Masatoshi Nakayama, 74, Japanese karate master.
- Albert L. Reeves Jr., 80, American politician, member of the United States House of Representatives (1947–1949).
- Samuel Rothschild, 87, Canadian NHL ice hockey player (Montreal Maroons).

=== 16 ===
- Charlotte Curtis, 58, American journalist, columnist and editor at The New York Times, cancer.
- Fateh Muhammad Panipati, 82, Pakistani Islamic scholar.
- Bikash Roy, 70, Indian actor and filmmaker.
- Juan Evangelista Venegas, 58, Puerto Rican boxer and Olympic medalist, fall.

=== 17 ===
- Carlton Barrett, 36, Jamaican reggae drummer, murdered.
- Arthur Delaney, 59, English painter.
- Cecil Harmsworth King, 86, English chairman of International Publishing Corporation, director of the Bank of England.
- Colette Rosambert, 76, French tennis player.
- Hena Rodríguez, 81, Colombian painter, educator, and first female Colombian sculptor.
- Dick Shawn, 63, American actor and comedian, heart attack.
- Willi Smith, 39, American fashion designer, pneumonia.
- Cornelius Van Til, 91, Dutch-born American Christian philosopher.

=== 18 ===
- Eduardo Alcaraz, 72, Chilean-Mexican actor.
- Vincent Aspey, 78, New Zealand violinist.
- Carlos Baker, 77, American writer, biographer and professor of literature.
- Heinie Beau, 76, American jazz composer, saxophonist and clarinetist, cancer.
- Kenneth Cook, 57, Australian journalist, television documentary maker and novelist (Wake in Fright), heart attack.
- Hugh B. Cott, 86, British zoologist.
- Vincent Hanley, 33, Irish radio DJ and television presenter, AIDS.
- Jim Langton, 69, Irish hurler.
- Joe Robb, 50, American NFL footballer (St. Louis Cardinals).

=== 19 ===
- Hugh Brannum, 77, American vocalist, composer and actor, cancer.
- Milt Kahl, 78, American animator for the Disney Studio, pneumonia.
- David G. Mandelbaum, 75, American anthropologist, cancer.
- Paul Maye, 73, French road bicycle racer.
- Frank McElyea, 68, American MLB player (Boston Braves).
- Roy Partlow, 75, American baseball player.
- Maxwell D. Taylor, 85, American army general and diplomat, Chairman of Joint Chiefs of Staff, ambassador to South Vietnam.
- Antony Tudor, 79, English dancer and choreographer, founded London Ballet, heart attack.

=== 20 ===
- Nicholas Acquavella, 88, American art dealer and gallerist, founder of Acquavella Galleries.
- Antonino Catalano, 54, Italian racing cyclist.
- Con Cremin, 78, Irish diplomat, U.N. representative.
- Arturo Torres, 80, Chilean Olympic footballer (1928).

=== 21 ===
- Joseph Alcazar, 77, Spanish-born French international footballer (Marseille, France).
- José Bañón, 65, Spanish footballer and coach.
- Gustav Bergmann, 80, Austrian-born American philosopher.
- Wenike Opurum Briggs, 69, Nigerian lawyer, journalist and politician.
- Aleksey Burdeyny, 78, Soviet Ukrainian general.
- Edith Green, 77, American politician, member of U.S. House of Representatives (1955–1974), cancer.
- Moosa AbdulRahman Hassan, Omani businessman, tribal leader and landlord.
- Patrick Martin, 63, American Olympic bobsledder (1948, 1952).
- Haruyasu Nakajima, 77, Japanese baseball player (Yomiuri Giants).
- Hildrus Poindexter, 85, American bacteriologist (tropical diseases).

=== 22 ===
- Irving Ashby, 66, American jazz guitarist, heart attack.
- Margaret Ponce Israel, 57, American painter and ceramicist, traffic accident.
- Eddie McCalmon, 84, Canadian NHL player (Chicago Black Hawks, Philadelphia Quakers).
- Ira E. McMillian, 78, American rear admiral.
- Masumi Mitsui, 99, Japanese-born Canadian World War I veteran.
- J. Edwin Orr, 75, Irish-born American Baptist minister, professor and author.
- George Tweedy, 74, English footballer.

=== 23 ===
- Larry Bethea, 30, American NFL footballer (Dallas Cowboys), suicide.

=== 24 ===
- Josephine Bell, 89, English physician and writer.
- Hubert Davison, 82, South African cricketer.
- Josefa Jara Martinez, 93, Philippine social worker, suffragist and civic leader.
- John Mihalic, 75, American MLB player (Washington Senators).
- Henry Murdoch, 66, Aboriginal Australian actor and stockman.
- Rodney Palmer, 79, English cricketer.
- Ross Thompson Roberts, 48, American district judge.
- Pablo Acosta Villarreal, 50, Mexican narcotics smuggler and crime boss, gunned down by Mexican Federal Police.
- Berhanu Zerihun, 53–54, Ethiopian writer and journalist.

=== 25 ===
- Blas Roca Calderio, 78, Cuban politician and Marxist theorist, President of the National Assembly of People's Power.
- Pētõr Damberg, 78, Latvian Livonian linguist and poet.
- Maurice Gibson, 73, Northern Irish High Court judge, car bomb.
- Charlotte May Pierstorff, 78, American girl who was shipped alive through the U.S. postal system by parcel post.
- John Potts, 80, British Olympic long-distance runner (1936).

=== 26 ===
- Bill Amos, 88, American college football player and coach.
- Oliver J. Flanagan, 66, Irish Fine Gael politician, Minister for Defence.
- Archie M. Gubbrud, 76, American politician, Governor of South Dakota, lung cancer.
- Frederick N. Howser, 82, American politician, Attorney General of California.
- Dudley Mason, 85, British master of the tanker SS Ohio in World War II, George Cross recipient.
- John Silkin, 64, British politician and solicitor, Shadow Leader of the House of Commons.
- Frank Szymanski, 63, American NFL footballer (Philadelphia Eagles).
- Amelita Ward, 63, American film actress.

=== 27 ===
- John Burrows, 73, American Major League baseball player (Chicago Cubs), house fire.
- Attila Hörbiger, 91, Austrian stage and movie actor, stroke.
- Alice Nāmakelua, 94, Hawaiian composer and performer.
- Bill O'Neill, 77, American NFL player.
- Bob Smith, 80, Australian rules footballer.

=== 28 ===
- Hannelore Baron, 60, German-born American artist, cancer.
- Bonny Campbell, 89, Australian rules footballer.
- Xavier Fourcade, 60, French-born American contemporary art dealer, pneumonia.
- Paidi Lakshmayya, 83, Indian actor, writer and politician, member of parliament.
- William Marchant, appr. 38, Northern Irish loyalist, shot by IRA gunmen.
- Paul Martin, 85, Swiss Olympic middle-distance runner (1920, 1924, 1928, 1932, 1936).
- Rolf Monsen, 88, American Olympic skier (1928, 1932).
- Emil Staiger, 79, Swiss historian, writer and professor of German studies.

=== 29 ===
- Bud Bates, 75, American MLB player (Philadelphia Phillies).
- Ludvig Olai Botnen, 77, Norwegian politician, newspaper editor, and journalist.
- Héctor Carmona, 61, Chilean modern pentathlete and Olympian (1956).
- Frank W. Crowe, 67, American physician.
- Gus Johnson, 48, American NBA basketballer (Baltimore Bullets), brain cancer.
- Helmut Laux, 70, Nazi German photographer.
- Philip Lombardo, 78, American boss of the Genovese crime family.
- Russ Saunders, 81, American NFL footballer (Green Bay Packers).
- Angelo Scalzone, 56, Italian Olympic sports shooter (1972).
- Mogens Thomassen, 72, Danish Olympic field hockey player (1936).
- Thomas Trenchard, 63, British hereditary peer, Minister of State for Defence Procurement.
- Harry Wolff, 81, Swedish Olympic boxer (1924).
- Zachari Zachariev, 83, Bulgarian military pilot and commander.

=== 30 ===
- Marc Aaronson, 36, American astronomer, observatory accident.
- Maurice Degrelle, 85, French Olympic sprinter (1924, 1928).
- Hugh Dempster, 86, British theatre and film actor, heart failure.

=== Unknown date ===
- Arthur Lane, 76, British actor.
