= Astanlı =

Astanlı or Astanly may refer to:

- Astanlı, Jalilabad, Azerbaijan
- Astanlı, Neftchala, Azerbaijan
- Astanlı, Yardymli, Azerbaijan
- Aşağı Astanlı, Azerbaijan
- Yuxarı Astanlı, Azerbaijan
