= Musa =

Musa may refer to:

== Places ==
- Mūša, a river in Lithuania and Latvia
- Musa, Azerbaijan, a village in Yardymli Rayon
- Musa, Iran, a village in Ilam province, Iran
- Musa, Chaharmahal and Bakhtiari, Iran
- Musa Kalayeh, Gilan province, Iran
- Abu Musa, an island in the Persian Gulf, Hormozgan province, Iran
- Musa, Kerman, Kerman province, Iran
- Musa, Bukan, West Azerbaijan province, Iran
- Musa, Maku, West Azerbaijan province, Iran
- Musa, Pakistan, a village in Chhachh, Attock, Punjab, Pakistan
- Musa, La Molina, a neighborhood in Lima, Peru
- Musa (crater), an impact crater on Saturn's moon Enceladus
- Musa (Tanzanian ward), a ward in Tanzania
- Musa (Pori), a district of Pori, Finland
- Musa Dagh a mountain peak in Turkey
- Jebel Musa (Morocco), a mountain known as one of the pillars of Hercules
- Jabal Musa, or Mount Sinai, a mountain in the Sinai Desert believed to be a possible location of the Biblical Mount Sinai
- Muza Emporion, an ancient port city near present day Mocha, Yemen

== People ==
- Musa (name), including a list of people with the surname and given name
- Moses in Islam
- Mansa Musa, hereditary ruler of the Mali Empire 1312–1337
- Musa of Parthia, queen of the Parthian Empire 2 BC to 4 AD
- Musa Sor, a Yazidi saint

== Fictional characters ==
- Musa, in the story "The City of Brass" in The Book of One Thousand and One Nights
- Musa, one of the main characters in Winx Club
- Musa, subject of the 2015 short story of that name by Kamel Daoud

== Acronyms ==
- Massey University Students' Associations Federation, several student organizations in New Zealand
- Musicians Union of South Africa, trade union
- Accademia Nazionale di Santa Cecilia Musical Instruments Museum, museum in Rome, Italy
- Made in USA, registered label by the Federal Trade Commission
- Multiple Unit Steerable Array, a type of antenna giving Musa connector its name
- Music of the United States of America (publications), series of critical editions of music
- MuSa, Musan Salama, a Finnish football club
- Museo Subacuático de Art, in English, Cancún Underwater Museum

== Other uses ==
- Müsa, an Italian bagpipe
- MUSA's, an Argentinian band
- Musa (album), a 2012 album by Ivy Queen
- Musa (film), a 2001 South Korean epic film
- Musa (plant), one of three genera in the family Musaceae that includes bananas and plantains
- Musa (horse), Thoroughbred mare and winner of 1899 Oaks Stakes.
- Musa connector, a type of coaxial connector used in the telecommunications and video industries
- Lancia Musa, an Italian car by Lancia
- 600 Musa, an asteroid

== See also ==
- MUSA (disambiguation)
- Moosa (disambiguation), a given name and surname
- Moosa (India), a village in Mansa, Punjab, India
- Mount Musa (disambiguation)
- Moussa (name)
- Musar (disambiguation)
