= List of Phi Epsilon Kappa chapters =

Phi Epsilon Kappa is a professional fraternity for exercise science. In the following list of chapters, active chapters are indicated in bold and inactive chapters are in italics.

Chapter	Charter date and range	Institution	Location	Status	Ref.
Alpha	April 12, 1913	Normal College of the American Gymnastic Union	Indianapolis, Indiana	Inactive	(Note: Chapter formed at the Normal College of the American Gymnastic Union, which merged into what is now Indiana University-Purdue University Indianapolis.)
Beta	1920	American College of Physical Education	Chicago, Illinois	Inactive	(Note: Chapter formed at the American College of Physical Education, which merged into DePaul University in 1946.)
Gamma	1921	Temple University	Philadelphia, Pennsylvania	Inactive	
Delta	1923–1943	Panzer College of Physical Education and Hygiene	Montclair, New Jersey	Inactive	
Epsilon	1924–1937	University of Akron	Akron, Ohio	Inactive	
Zeta	1924–before 1962	Columbia University	New York City, New York	Inactive	
Eta	1924	The College of New Jersey	Ewing Township, New Jersey	Inactive	
Theta	1925	University of Wisconsin–Madison	Madison, Wisconsin	Inactive	
Iota	1925	University of Iowa	Iowa City, Iowa	Inactive	
**Kappa**	1925–xxxx ?, 2014	University of Michigan	Ann Arbor, Michigan	Active	
Lambda	1926	University of California, Los Angeles	Los Angeles, California	Inactive	
Mu	1926	Ithaca College	Ithaca, New York	Inactive	
Nu	1926	University of Wisconsin–La Crosse	La Crosse, Wisconsin	Inactive	
Xi	1927–before 1962	University of Wyoming	Laramie, Wyoming	Inactive	
Omicron	1928	University of Oregon	Eugene, Oregon	Inactive	
Pi	1928	University of Montana	Missoula, Montana	Inactive	
Rho	1929	University of Illinois Urbana-Champaign		Inactive	
Sigma	1930	University of Minnesota		Inactive	
Tau	1930	University of Nebraska–Lincoln	Lincoln, Nebraska	Inactive	
Upsilon	1930	University of Cincinnati	Cincinnati, Ohio	Inactive	
Phi	1930	Kansas State University	Manhattan, Kansas	Inactive	
Chi	1931	Occidental College	Los Angeles, California	Inactive	
Psi	1931–before 1962	Ohio Wesleyan University	Delaware, Ohio	Inactive	
Omega	1932–1936	Ohio State University	Columbus, Ohio	Inactive	
Alpha Alpha	1934	Indiana University	Bloomington, Indiana	Inactive	
Alpha Beta (see **Theta Mu**)	1934	Pennsylvania State College	State College, Pennsylvania	Inactive	
Alpha Gamma	1934	Washington State University	Pullman, Washington	Inactive	
Alpha Delta	1934?	Kent State University	Kent, Ohio	Inactive	
Sigma Alpha	1935–1952	University of Southern California	Los Angeles, California	Inactive	
Alpha Epsilon	1939–1952	San Jose State University	San Jose, California	Inactive	
Alpha Zeta	1941–1956	Boston University	Boston, Massachusetts	Inactive	
**Alpha Eta**	1943	Manhattan College	Bronx, New York City, New York	Active	
Alpha Theta	1948–1953	Utah State University	Logan, Utah	Inactive	
Alpha Iota	1949	Miami University	Oxford, Ohio	Inactive	
Alpha Kappa	1949	University of North Dakota	Grand Forks, North Dakota	Inactive	
Alpha Lambda	1949	Wake Forest University	Winston-Salem, North Carolina	Inactive	
**Alpha Mu**	1950	Michigan State University	East Lansing, Michigan	Active	
Alpha Nu	1950	University of Buffalo	Buffalo, New York	Inactive	
Alpha Xi	1950	Brooklyn College	New York City, New York	Inactive	
Alpha Omicron	1950	Syracuse University	Syracuse, New York	Inactive	
Alpha Pi	1951	Northeast Louisiana University	Monroe, Louisiana	Inactive	
Alpha Rho	1951	California State University, Los Angeles	Los Angeles, California	Inactive	
Alpha Sigma	1953	College of the Pacific	Stockton, California	Inactive	
Alpha Tau	1953	Bowling Green State University	Bowling Green, Ohio	Inactive	
Alpha Upsilon	1956	University of Washington	Seattle, Washington	Inactive	
Alpha Phi	1956	Arizona State University	Tempe, Arizona	Inactive	
Alpha Chi	1956	Southeastern Louisiana University	Hammond, Louisiana	Inactive	
Alpha Psi	1957	University of Kansas	Lawrence, Kansas	Inactive	
Alpha Omega	1957	University of Idaho	Moscow, Idaho	Inactive	
Beta Alpha	1957	California State University, Long Beach	Long Beach, California	Inactive	
Beta Beta	1958	Florida State University	Tallahassee, Florida	Inactive	
Beta Gamma	1960	Texas Tech University	Lubbock, Texas	Inactive	
Beta Delta	1961	Central Michigan University	Mount Pleasant, Michigan	Inactive	
Beta Epsilon	196x ?	Slippery Rock University	Slippery Rock, Pennsylvania	Inactive	
Beta Zeta	196x ?	Eastern Illinois University	Charleston, Illinois	Inactive	
Beta Eta	196x ?	West Texas A&M University	Canyon, Texas	Inactive	
Beta Theta	196x ?	Springfield College	Springfield, Massachusetts	Inactive	
Beta Iota	1962	East Carolina University	Greenville, North Carolina	Inactive	
Beta Kappa	196x ?	University of Bridgeport	Bridgeport, Connecticut	Inactive	
Beta Lambda	196x ?	University of Nevada	Paradise, Nevada	Inactive	
Beta Mu	196x ?	California State University, Northridge	Los Angeles, California	Inactive	
Beta Nu	196x ?	University of Miami	Coral Gables, Florida	Inactive	
Beta Xi	196x ?	Central Washington University	Ellensburg, Washington	Inactive	
Beta Omicron	196x ?	Niagra University	Lewiston, New York	Inactive	
**Beta Pi**	196x ?	SUNY Brockport	Brockport, New York	Active	
Beta Rho	196x ?	Eastern New Mexico University	Portales, New Mexico	Inactive	
Beta Sigma	196x ?	Georgia Southern University	Statesboro, Georgia	Inactive	
Beta Tau	196x ?	Indiana State University	Terre Haute, Indiana	Inactive	
Beta Upsilon	196x ?	University of North Texas	Denton, Texas	Inactive	
Beta Phi	196x ?	Kansas State University	Manhattan, Kansas	Inactive	
Beta Chi	196x ?	University of Nebraska Omaha	Omaha, Nebraska	Inactive	
Beta Psi	196x ?	University of Georgia	Athens, Georgia	Inactive	
Beta Omega	196x ?	East Stroudsburg University of Pennsylvania	East Stroudsburg, Pennsylvania	Inactive	
**Gamma Alpha**	196x ?	West Chester University	West Chester, Pennsylvania	Active	
Gamma Beta	196x ?	Texas A&M University	College Station, Texas	Inactive	
Gamma Gamma	196x ?	Eastern Washington University	Cheney, Washington	Inactive	
Gamma Delta					
Gamma Epsilon	196x ?	University of Missouri	Columbia, Missouri	Inactive	
**Gamma Zeta**	1969	Grambling State University	Grambling, Louisiana	Active	
Gamma Eta	19xx ?	South Dakota State University	Brookings, South Dakota	Inactive	
Gamma Theta	19xx ?	Midwestern University	Downers Grove, Illinois	Inactive	
Gamma Iota	19xx ?	Southeast Missouri State University	Cape Girardeau, Missouri	Inactive	
Gamma Kappa	19xx ?	Chadron State College	Chadron, Nebraska	Inactive	
Gamma Lambda	19xx ?	Eastern Kentucky University	Richmond, Kentucky	Inactive	
Gamma Mu	19xx ?	Shepherd University	Shepherdstown, West Virginia	Inactive	
Gamma Nu	19xx ?	University of Central Missouri	Warrensburg, Missouri	Inactive	
Gamma Xi	19xx ?	Marshall University	Huntington, West Virginia	Inactive	
Gamma Omicron	19xx ?	Grand Valley State University	Allendale, Michigan	Inactive	
Gamma Pi	19xx ?	University of Missouri–St. Louis	St. Louis, Missouri	Inactive	
Gamma Rho	19xx ?	Ball State University	Muncie, Indiana	Inactive	
Gamma Sigma	19xx ?	University of West Florida	Pensacola, Florida	Inactive	
**Gamma Tau**	19xx ?	Indiana University of Pennsylvania	Indiana, Pennsylvania	Active	
Gamma Upsilon	19xx ?	New Mexico State University	Las Cruces, New Mexico	Inactive	
Gamma Phi	19xx ?	University of Alabama	Tuscaloosa, Alabama	Inactive	
Gamma Chi	19xx ?	Frostburg State University	Frostburg, Maryland	Inactive	
Gamma Psi	19xx ?	Oklahoma State University	Stillwater, Oklahoma	Inactive	
Gamma Omega	19xx ?	Kean University		Inactive	
Delta Alpha	19xx ?	Hope College	Holland, Michigan	Inactive	
Delta Beta	19xx ?	Ohio Northern University	Ada, Ohio	Inactive	
**Delta Gamma**	19xx ?	James Madison University	Harrisonburg, Virginia	Active	
Delta Delta	19xx ?	Arkansas State University	Jonesboro, Arkansas	Inactive	
Delta Epsilon	19xx ?	University of North Carolina Wilmington	Wilmington, North Carolina	Inactive	
Delta Zeta	19xx ?	Auburn University	Auburn, Alabama	Inactive	
**Delta Eta**	19xx ?	Adelphi University	Garden City, New York	Active	
Delta Theta	19xx ?	Fort Hays State University	Hays, Kansas	Inactive	
Delta Iota	19xx ?	Middle Tennessee State University	Murfreesboro, Tennessee	Inactive	
Delta Kappa	19xx ?	University of West Georgia	Carrollton, Georgia	Inactive	
Delta Lambda					
Delta Mu					
Delta Nu	19xx ?	University of Toledo	Toledo, Ohio	Inactive	
Delta Xi	19xx ?	Edinboro University of Pennsylvania	Edinboro, Pennsylvania	Inactive	
Delta Omicron	19xx ?	Anderson University	Anderson, Indiana	Inactive	
Delta Pi	19xx ?	Barry University	Miami Shores, Florida	Inactive	
**Delta Sigma**	19xx ?	Troy University	Troy, Alabama	Active	
**Delta Tau**	19xx ?	University of Pittsburgh at Bradford	Bradford, Pennsylvania	Active	
**Delta Upsilon**	19xx ?	Nebraska Wesleyan University	Lincoln, Nebraska	Active	
Delta Phi					
**Delta Chi**	1997	Truman State University	Kirksville, Missouri	Active	(Note: Chapter formed from the HES Club (Health and Exercise Science), established in 1990.)
Delta Psi	199x ?	Winthrop University	Rock Hill, South Carolina	Inactive	
Delta Omega					
Epsilon Alpha	199x ?	Western Michigan University	Kalamazoo, Michigan	Inactive	
**Epsilon Beta**	199x ?	Ursinus College	Collegeville, Pennsylvania	Active	
Epsilon Gamma	199x ?	Missouri Western State University	St. Joseph, Missouri	Inactive	
**Epsilon Delta**	199x ?	Keene State College	Keene, New Hampshire	Active	
Epsilon Epsllon					
**Epsilon Zeta**	199x ?	Tarleton State University	Stephenville, Texas	Active	
**Epsilon Eta**	199x ?	Florida Southern College	Lakeland, Florida	Active	
Epsilon Theta	199x ?	Salisbury University	Salisbury, Maryland	Inactive	
Epsilon Iota					
Epsilon Kappa					
Epsilon Lambda	May 7, 2001 – 20xx ?	Towson University	Towson, Maryland	Inactive	
Epsilon Mu					
Epsilon Nu					
Epsilon Xi					
**Epsilon Omicron**	200x ?	University of Florida	Gainesville, Florida	Active	
**Epsilon Pi**	200x ?	McMurry University	Abilene, Texas	Active	
Epsilon Rho					
Epsilon Sigma	200x ?–20xx ?	Marywood University	Scranton, Pennsylvania	Inactive	
**Epsilon Tau**	May 2003	West Liberty University	West Liberty, West Virginia	Active	
Epsilon Upsilon	200x ?–20xx ?	Hardin–Simmons University	Abilene, Texas	Inactive	
Epsilon Phi	200x ?–20xx ?	Messiah University	Mechanicsburg, Pennsylvania	Inactive	
Epsilon Chi					
**Epsilon Psi**	200x ?	Longwood University	Farmville, Virginia	Active	
Epsilon Omega	200x ?–20xx ?	Oklahoma City University	Oklahoma City, Oklahoma	Inactive	
**Zeta Alpha**	200x ?	Olivet College	Olivet, Michigan	Active	
**Zeta Beta**	2004	Plymouth State University	Plymouth, New Hampshire	Active	
**Zeta Gamma**	2004	University of Scranton	Scranton, Pennsylvania	Active	
Zeta Delta	200x ?–20xx ?	High Point University	High Point, North Carolina	Inactive	
Zeta Epsilon					
**Zeta Zeta**	200x ?	Jackson State University	Jackson, Mississippi	Active	
Zeta Eta	200x ?–20xx ?	Wingate University	Wingate, North Carolina	Inactive	
Zeta Theta	200x ?–20xx ?	Albion College	Albion, Michigan	Inactive	
Zeta Iota	200x ?–20xx ?	Fairmont State University	Fairmont, West Virginia	Inactive	
Zeta Kappa	200x ?–20xx ?	Auburn University	Auburn, Alabama	Inactive	
**Zeta Lambda**	2004	Whittier College	Whittier, California	Active	
**Zeta Mu**	2006	Texas A&M University–Kingsville	Kingsville, Texas	Active	
**Zeta Nu**	200x ?	Mitchell College	New London, Connecticut	Active	
**Zeta Xi**	200x ?	Johnson C. Smith University	Charlotte, North Carolina	Active	
Zeta Omicron	200x ?–20xx ?	Eastern Michigan University	Ypsilanti, Michigan	Inactive	
Zeta Pi	200x ?–20xx ?	West Virginia University	Morgantown, West Virginia	Inactive	
Zeta Rho					
Zeta Sigma	200x ?–20xx ?	Berea College	Berea, Kentucky	Inactive	
**Zeta Tau**	200x ?	Immaculata University	East Whiteland Township, Pennsylvania	Active	
Zeta Upsilon					
Zeta Phi	200x ?–20xx ?	California State University, Chico	Chico, California	Inactive	
Zeta Chi	200x ?–20xx ?	Linfield University	McMinnville, Oregon	Inactive	
**Zeta Psi**	2009	Tennessee Tech	Cookeville, Tennessee	Active	
**Zeta Omega**	20xx ?	University of Lynchburg	Lynchburg, Virginia	Active	
**Eta Alpha**	20xx ?	North Carolina Central University	Durham, North Carolina	Active	
Eta Beta	20xx ?–20xx ?	University of Louisiana at Monroe	Monroe, Louisiana	Inactive	
**Eta Gamma**	20xx ?	University of Indianapolis	Indianapolis, Indiana	Active	
**Eta Delta**	20xx ?	North Carolina A&T State University	Greensboro, North Carolina	Active	
Eta Epsilon					
**Eta Zeta**	20xx ?	Salem State University	Salem, Massachusetts	Active	
**Eta Eta**	20xx ?	Louisiana Tech University	Ruston, Louisiana	Active	
**Eta Theta**	20xx ?	Concordia University	Montreal, Quebec, Canada	Active	
**Eta Iota**	2011	Ouachita Baptist University	Arkadelphia, Arkansas	Active	
**Eta Kappa**	April 5, 2012	University of the Pacific	Stockton, California	Active	
Eta Lambda	201x ?–20xx ?	Cardinal Stritch University	Milwaukee County, Wisconsin	Inactive	
**Eta Mu**	201x ?	Stephen F. Austin State University	Nacogdoches, Texas	Active	
Eta Nu	201x ?–20xx ?	Emporia State University	Emporia, Kansas	Inactive	
Eta Xi	201x ?–20xx ?	Shenandoah University	Winchester, Virginia	Inactive	
**Eta Omicron**	201x ?	Jacksonville State University	Jacksonville, Alabama	Active	
**Eta Pi**	201x ?	Morehouse College	Atlanta, Georgia	Active	
Eta Rho	201x ?–20xx ?	Central Connecticut State University	New Britain, Connecticut	Inactive	
**Eta Sigma**	201x ?	University of Dayton	Dayton, Ohio	Active	
**Eta Tau**	201x ?	Chowan University	Murfreesboro, North Carolina	Active	
**Eta Upsilon**	201x ?	Endicott College	Beverly, Massachusetts	Active	
**Eta Phi**	201x ?	University of Wyoming	Laramie, Wyoming	Active	(Note: Chapter formed from the local club CHESNut (Community Health, Exercise Science, and Nutrition).)
**Eta Chi**	201x ?	Delaware State University	Dover, Delaware	Active	
Eta Psi	201x ?–20xx ?	Southern Connecticut State University	New Haven, Connecticut	Inactive	
**Eta Omega**	201x ?	Concordia University Irvine	Irvine, California	Active	
**Theta Alpha**	December 2014	Evangel University	Springfield, Missouri	Active	
**Theta Beta**	2015	Prairie View A&M University	Prairie View, Texas	Active	
Theta Gamma	201x ?	Norfolk State University	Norfolk, Virginia	Inactive	
**Theta Delta**	201x ?	Mississippi College	Clinton, Mississippi	Active	
Theta Epsilon	201x ?	Lincoln College	Lincoln, Illinois	Inactive	
Theta Zeta	201x ?	Simpson College	Indianola, Iowa	Inactive	
Theta Eta	201x ?	Albany State University	Albany, Georgia	Inactive	
Theta Theta					
**Theta Iota**	201x ?	Langston University	Langston, Oklahoma	Active	
**Theta Kappa**	April 2017	Vanguard University	Costa Mesa, California	Active	
**Theta Lambda**	201x ?	Hampton University	Hampton, Virginia	Active	
**Theta Mu** (see Alpha Beta)	November 7, 2018	Pennsylvania State University	State College, Pennsylvania	Active	
Theta Nu	201x ?–20xx ?	Lenoir–Rhyne University	Hickory, North Carolina	Inactive	
**Theta Xi**	2019	Warner University	Lake Wales, Florida	Active	
**Theta Omicron**	2019	University of Central Arkansas	Conway, Arkansas	Active	
**Theta Pi**	2019	Salem College	Winston-Salem, North Carolina	Active	
**Theta Rho**	2019	State University of New York at Fredonia	Fredonia, New York	Active	
**Theta Sigma**	20xx ?	Oakwood University	Huntsville, Alabama	Active	
**Theta Tau**	2020	University of La Verne	La Verne, California	Active	
**Theta Upsilon**	202x ?	Adrian College	Adrian, Michigan	Active	
**Theta Phi**	202x ?	Virginia State University	Ettrick, Virginia	Active	
**Theta Chi**	202x ?	Cedar Crest College	Allentown, Pennsylvania	Active	
**Theta Psi**	202x ?	Catawba College	Salisbury, North Carolina	Active	
**Theta Omega**	202x ?	Ripon College	Ripon, Wisconsin	Active	
**Iota Alpha**	202x ?	University of Delaware	Newark, Delaware	Active	
**Iota Beta**	January 2022	University of North Carolina at Chapel Hill	Chapel Hill, North Carolina	Active	
**Iota Gamma**	202x ?	Park University	Parkville, Missouri	Active	
**Iota Delta**	202x ?	Park University, Gilbert Campus	Gilbert, Arizona	Active	
**Iota Zeta**	202x ?	McNeese State University	Lake Charles, Louisiana	Active	
		Doane University	Crete, Nebraska	Active	
