= Reginald Davies =

Reginald or Reg Davies may refer to:

- Reg Davies (footballer, born 1929) (1929–2009), Welsh international football player
- Reg Davies (footballer, born 1933), English football player
- Reg Davies (politician) (born 1943), Australian politician
- Reginald Davies (footballer, born 1897) (1897–1977), English football player
- Reg Davies (Australian footballer) (1909–1987), Australian rules footballer
