= Moosa (given name) =

Moosa is the Arabic given name for Moses. Notable people with the name include:

- Moosa Ghazi (1938–2003), Pakistani footballer
- Moosa AbdulRahman Hassan (died 1987), Omani businessman
- Moosa Ali Jaleel (born 1960), Maldivian military officer
- Moosa Bin Shamsher (born 1945), Bangladeshi businessman
- Moosa Manik (born 1963), Maldivian footballer and manager
- Moosa Moolla (1934–2023), South African activist and diplomat
- Moosa Raza (born 1937), Indian civil servant
- Moosa Yaamin (born 1992), Maldivian footballer
- Anthony "Moosa" Tiffith Jr., president of Top Dawg Entertainment

== See also ==
- Moosa (disambiguation)
