= Jebel Musa (disambiguation) =

Jebel Musa, Jabal Moussa or Gebel Musa (Arabic: جبل موسى, 'Mountain of Moses') may refer to:

- Mount Sinai, a mountain in the Sinai Peninsula of Egypt
  - Biblical Mount Sinai
- Jebel Musa (Morocco), a mountain in Morocco
- Jabal Moussa Biosphere Reserve, a natural area in Lebanon
- Musa Dagh, a mountain in Turkey, known as Jebel Musa in Arabic

== See also ==
- Mount Musa (disambiguation)
- Mount Sinai (disambiguation)
- Musa (disambiguation)
- Jabal Moussa Biosphere Reserve, a natural area in Lebanon
