= Mount Musa =

Mount Musa may refer to:

- Musa Dagh, a mountain near the Gulf of İskenderun in Turkey
- Jebel Musa (Morocco), mountain in northern Morocco, near the Straits of Gibraltar
- Jabal Musa, or Mount Sinai, a mountain in the Sinai Peninsula of Egypt

== See also ==
- Musa (disambiguation)
- Jebel Musa (disambiguation)
