= MUSA =

MUSA may refer to:

- Manufacturing USA, a network of research institutes in the United States
- Museum of the University of St Andrews
- Cancún Underwater Museum, known as MUSA from its Spanish name, El Museo subaquático de Arte
- San Antonio de los Baños Airfield
- Musa (Ilkhanid dynasty), a Mongol ruler of the 14th century
- Musa (robot), robot that can fight using Kendo
- MUSA (MUltichannel Speaking Automaton), an early computer machine aimed to speech synthesis, built at CSELT starting from 1975

== See also ==
- Musa (disambiguation)
