= Lucia Nifontova =

Finnish ballet dancer

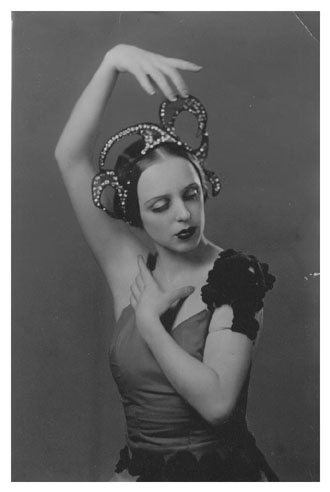
- Born: Russian: Любовь Андреевна Нифонтова, romanized: Lyubov Andreyevna Nifontova; August 30, 1913; Helsinki, Finland
- Died: April 6, 1987 (aged 73); Helsinki, Finland
- Occupation: Ballet dancer
- Years active: 1927–1947
- Organization(s): Finnish National Ballet, Ballet Russe de Monte-Carlo
- Awards: Pro Finlandia (1955)

Lucia Nifontova-Saurama (born Russian: Любовь Андреевна Нифонтова, romanized: Lyubov Andreyevna Nifontova; 30 August 1913 – 6 April 1987), better known as Lucia Nifontova, was a Finnish ballet dancer and Finland’s first prima ballerina assoluta. In the 1930s and 40s she and her partner Arvo Martikainen were the leading dancers in Finland and among the foremost artists in Finnish ballet of all time periods. Her performances of Odette and Odile in Swan Lake were especially noted for their artistic accomplishment and emotional interpretation.

== Biography ==
=== Early life and education ===
Nifontova was born in Helsinki, then part of the Russian Empire, to Andrei Ivanovich Nifontov (Russian: Андрей Иванович Нифонтов; 1876–1962), a Russian imperial civil servant, and Alexandra Nifontova (née Teresia Emilia Grönros; (Note: Lucia’s mother took a new given name upon marriage as well as taking a new surname, as she converted to her husband’s religion.) 1879–1945) of Tuusula. She was called Lucia both at home and in public.

She spent six years at a Russian-language elementary school in Helsinki, after which she entered the Hilma Liiman Dance School and then continued her studies at the Helsinki Dance Institute. (Note: This school, directed by Rafael Penger, closed in 1924. It is not the school with the same name that now operates in Helsinki.) There she studied under ballerinas from the Mariinsky Theatre Elisabeth Apostoli and Mary Paischeff. Her first public performance was at age 12 in Hollandsflickan ("The Little Dutch Girl") at Helsinki’s Swedish Theatre.

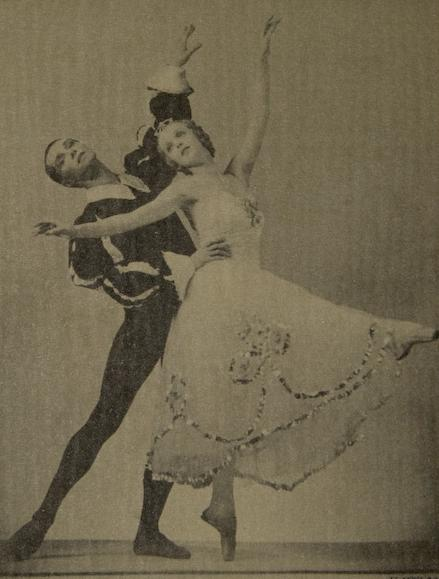
Arvo Martikainen and Nifontova

=== Finnish National Ballet ===
Dancer and choreographer George Gé noticed Nifontova’s talent and brought her to the Finnish National Ballet, over which he was the ballet master. There she studied under Gé and other Russian immigrants such as Lyubov Yegorova, Mathilde Kschessinska, Nikolai Legat and Olga Preobrajenska. In 1928 she danced the lead role of Clara in the first performance of The Nutcracker outside Russia. Dancing the role of the Nutcracker Prince was Martikainen, who was to be paired with Nifontova in numerous productions up through the year of his death in 1946. Over the next seven years she danced lead roles in The Sleeping Beauty, Petrushka, Le Spectre de la rose, Swan Lake, Coppélia, Le Bal and Die Puppenfee. She also appeared in a few Finnish films, usually in dancing scenes.

=== Ballet Russe de Monte-Carlo ===
During the global depression of the 1930s the Finnish National Ballet suffered great difficulties in paying its artists, and in 1935 Nifontova and Martikainen, along with Gé, Kschessinska and Preobrajenska, left Finland and joined René Blum's Ballet Russe de Monte-Carlo. Nifontova’s coach in the new company was the groundbreaking choreographer Michel Fokine. They performed in Paris, London and South Africa, among other locales.

=== Return to Finland ===
In 1938 retired soprano Aino Ackté took over direction of the Finnish National Ballet and Nifontova returned for two seasons, performing the lead roles in The Sleeping Beauty, Onnen linna and Le Pavillon d'Armide. After that Nifontova danced periodically as a guest artist at the Finnish National Ballet as well as abroad.

In 1941 she directed a production of Les Sylphides using choreography she had learned from Fokine. She and Martikainen also taught advanced classes in Fokine’s difficult techniques. Her final performance was in 1947 as Odette in Swan Lake.

=== Marriage, children and death ===
In 1938 she married Eero Saurama (1903–1964), a senior official in the National Coalition Party. They had one son, Antti Saurama (1941–2010). She died aged 73 in 1987 at Meilahti Hospital and is buried next to her parents and son in Helsinki Orthodox Cemetery.

== Awards and legacy ==
In 1945 Nifontova was named the best classical dancer at an international choreography contest organized by Rolf de Maré in Stockholm. In 1955 she was awarded the Pro Finlandia medal of the Order of the Lion of Finland, the country’s highest honor for artists. Her name lives on (as of 2020) in the Lucia Nifontova scholarship distributed by Pro Dance to dance students and teachers.

== Repertoire ==
Ballets, operas and operettas at the Finnish National Opera and Ballet, excluding performances on tour:

- La belle Hélène (1927, 1929) – Dancer
- Aida (1928–1929) – Dancer
- The Nutcracker (1928–1929) – Clara
- Kreisleriana (1929–1930) – Page
- Petrushka (1929–1930) – The Ballerina
- The Sleeping Beauty (1930, 1938–1939) – Princess Briar Rose
- Don Quixote (1930–1931) – Juanita
- Sininen helmi ("The Blue Pearl") – Queen of the Pearl (1931), Princess Elisif (1934–1935)
- Die Fledermaus (1931–1933) – Mitzi
- Le Spectre de la rose (1931) – Girl
- Hungaria (1931) – Dancer
- En saga (1931) – Dancer
- Vesipatsas ("The Waterspout") (1931–1932) – Dancer
- Jeftan tytär ("The Daughter of Jephtha") (1931–1932) – The Actress
- Swan Lake (1932–1933, 1945–1947) – Odette, Odile
- The Demon (1932–1933) – Dancer
- Coppélia (1932–1933) – Swanhilda
- Les Sylphides (1933–1934, 1941–1942) – Dancer
- Le Bal ("The Ball") (1933) – The Lady
- Cléopâtre (1933–1934) – Arsinoe
- Die Puppenfee ("The Fairy Doll") (1933–1934) – Fairy Doll
- The Merry Widow (1934–1935) – Dancer
- Giuditta (1934–1935) – Dancer
- Thaïs (1934) – Dancer
- Venus in Seide ("Venus in Silk") (1935) – Zingra
- Onnen linna ("The Castle of Happiness") (1938–1939) – Liisa
- Le Pavillon d'Armide (1939) – Armide
- The Gay Hussars (1940) – Dancer
- La flûte magique (1941–1942) – Lise
- Näkyjä ("Visions") (1946) – Soul

== Filmography ==
- Mustat silmät ("Dark Eyes", 1929 feature) – the film has been lost and what role Nifontova plays is unknown
- Jääkärin morsian (“Bride of the Jäger”, 1931 feature), ballerina at the Warsaw Opera
- Minä ja ministeri ("Me and the Minister", 1934 feature), Mademoiselle Ninette
- Kenttäpostia ("Field mail", 1942 short) – Musical performances intercut with life at the front
- Suomalaista balettia ("Finnish ballet", 1950 short) – depicts a ballet rehearsal and performance
