= Moosa (surname) =

Moosa is a South African surname. It is the Arabic name for Moses (see also Moses in Islam). Notable people with the name include:

- Mohammed Valli Moosa (born 1957), South African politician
- Ahmed Shafeeq Ibrahim Moosa (born 1968), Maldivian scientist and politician
- Naushad Moosa (born 1971), Indian footballer
- Riaad Moosa (born 1977), South African comedian and actor
- Rahima Moosa (1922–1993), South African activist
- Therlo Moosa (born 1994), South African soccer player
- Zane Moosa (born 1968), South African footballer

== See also ==
- Moosa
