= Musar =

Musar may refer to:

- Jewish ethics
- Musar literature, Jewish moral literature
- Musar movement, a Jewish religious ethical, educational and cultural movement
- Château Musar, a Lebanese winery

== See also ==
- Musa (disambiguation)
