= Moosa =

Moosa may refer to:

- Moosa (given name)
- Moosa (surname), South African surname
- Moosa (India), a village in Mansa District of Punjab State, India

== See also ==
- Musa (disambiguation)
