= Albert L. Ireland =

Decorated United States Marine

Albert Luke Ireland
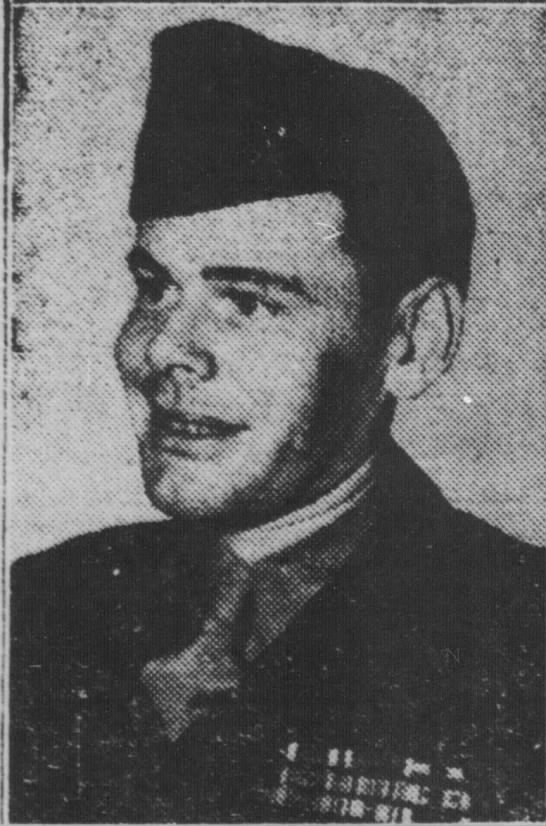
- Ireland in early 1951, before shipping out for Korea
- Born: February 25, 1918; Nelsonville, New York, U.S.
- Died: November 16, 1997 (aged 79); Larned, Kansas, U.S.
- Burial place: Cold Spring Cemetery, Philipstown, New York
- Education: Ithaca College (BS); University of Arizona; Notre Dame University
- Military career
- Allegiance: Canada (1941); United States (1941–1953)
- Branch: Royal Canadian Air Force; United States Marine Corps
- Service years: 1941–1953
- Rank: Staff sergeant
- Service number: 364663
- Units: 1st Battalion, 4th Marines; 3rd Battalion, 5th Marines
- Conflicts: World War II; Battle of Guadalcanal; Battle of Okinawa; Korean War
- Awards: Bronze Star Medal (2); Purple Heart (9)
- Website: National Purple Heart Hall of Honor page

Albert Luke Ireland (February 25, 1918 – November 16, 1997) was a United States Marine Corps staff sergeant. Serving in both World War II and the Korean War, Ireland earned the Purple Heart medal nine times for wounds in combat, the most of any U.S. marine in history.

Ireland was born and received secondary education in Putnam County, New York. Following a brief enlistment in the Royal Canadian Air Force, he joined the U.S. Marine Corps in 1941 after the Attack on Pearl Harbor and served in the Pacific Theater. He fought in the Battles of Guadalcanal and Okinawa, earning five Purple Hearts before the surrender of Japan. In the fall of 1950, Ireland volunteered for active duty in the Korean War, leading an infantry unit and earning a further four Purple Hearts.

Ireland concluded his military service in 1953, worked as a teacher in New York City, and participated in several veteran organizations. In 1976, he suffered serious injuries while rescuing a student from muggers. The New York City Police formally honored Ireland for this action in 1979. In his later years, Ireland lived in Kansas, and died in 1997. He was buried in a memorial service in Philipstown, New York.

== Early life and education ==
Ireland was born in Nelsonville, New York on February 25, 1918, the son of Albert Ireland and Katherine McGee Ireland. He was a longtime resident of both Nelsonville and nearby Cold Spring, and attended Haldane High School in Cold Spring. His brother, Francis J. Ireland, also served in the U.S. Army during World War II.

Ireland attended the School of Health and Education at Ithaca College from 1948 to 1949. He also attended the University of Arizona and University of Notre Dame, entering the Notre Dame physical education school with plans of becoming a coach. At age 36, he won the Notre Dame bantamweight boxing championship. After his Korean War service, he graduated Ithaca College in 1956 with a Bachelor of Science degree. He was also sports editor of the Ithaca college yearbook and a member of Phi Epsilon Kappa.

== Military service ==
=== World War II service ===
==== Canadian Air Force service ====
In 1941, Ireland enlisted in the Royal Canadian Air Force (RCAF), beginning his military career. At the time, the United States had not yet entered the Second World War. Ireland desired to become a fighter pilot, but a sinus problem prevented him. He spent only nine months in the RCAF, leaving in November 1941. "After a few times in the air," he later remarked, "they discovered my sinus condition."

==== U.S. Marine Corps service ====
Five days after Pearl Harbor, Ireland joined the U.S. Marines. He spent 27 months overseas, serving as a machine gunner. He suffered his first wound in the Guadalcanal Campaign on January 23, 1943, when two pieces of shrapnel penetrated his back and lodged in his left lung. Ireland also contracted malaria during the Guadalcanal Campaign.

Ireland received four more wounds in the Battle of Okinawa. His first Okinawa wound, shrapnel in the leg and right arm, occurred on April 16, 1945. On May 22, shrapnel struck him again, and on May 23, shrapnel hit his face. His final Okinawa wound was a sniper's bullet to the face on June 12, when two teeth were shot out. All of his Okinawa wounds occurred on Sugar Loaf Hill, where he served with the 1st Battalion, 4th Marines, 6th Marine Division.

Ireland earned five Purple Hearts during his World War II service. Still carrying shrapnel in his lung, he returned to the United States in 1945 with full disability, spending a year as a Veterans Administration patient. Doctors advised surgery to remove half of his lung, but he refused the operation. He traveled to Arizona and, eventually, his lungs improved. Remarking on his recovery, Ireland later said: "I was only 40% disabled and the doctors said it was a miracle. I still have that piece of shrapnel in my lung."

=== Korean War service ===
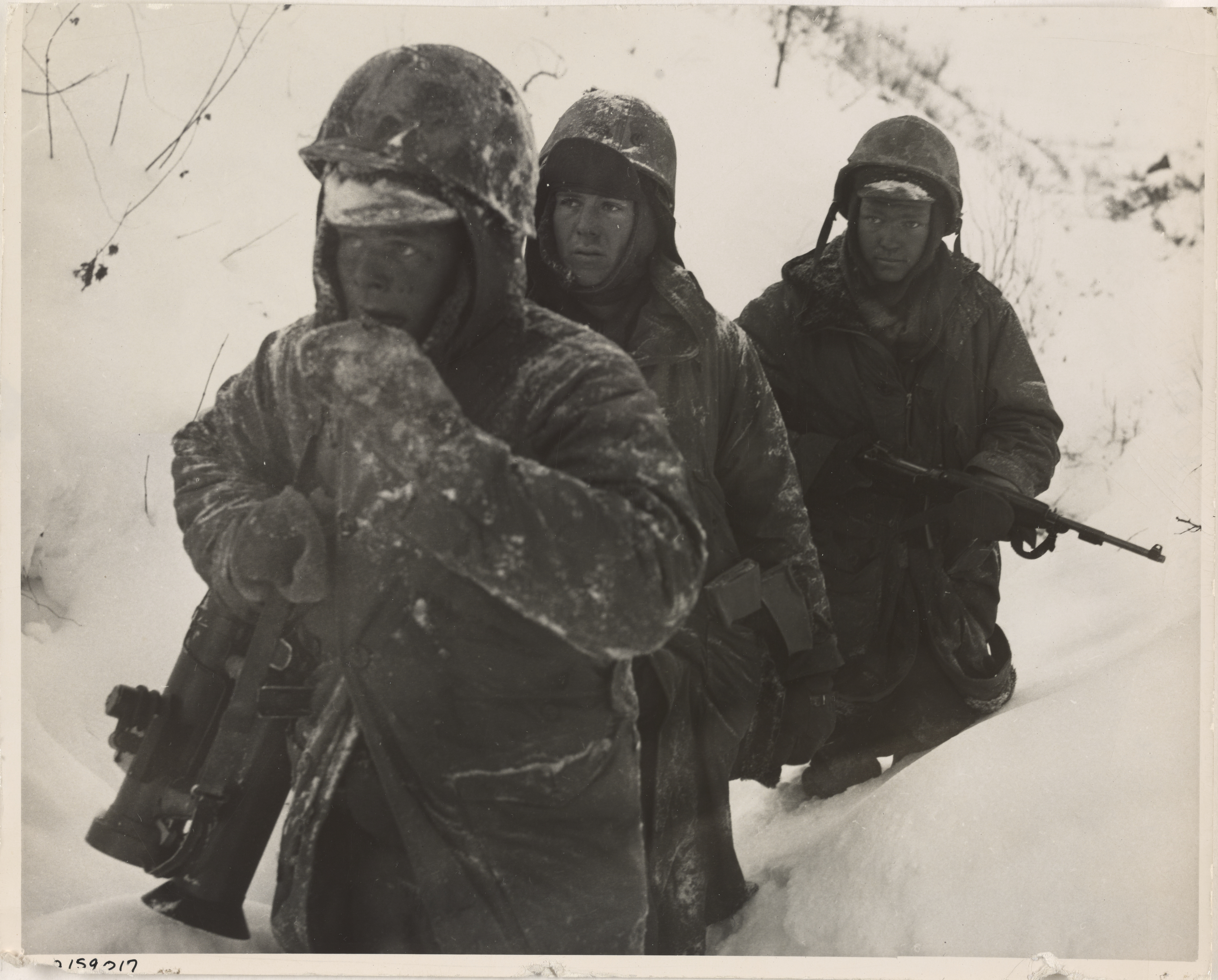
Ireland leading his squad up a steep, snow-covered ridge, back to the front lines after a sniper patrol in Korea, 1951

Ireland became a Marine Corps Reservist after the end of World War II. In the fall of 1950, he volunteered for active duty in the Korean War, completing refresher combat training at Camp Lejeune in early January 1951 and applying for combat duty. However, because Ireland had received more than two Purple Hearts, the first sergeant there who was composing the list of Marines for Korean service attempted to stop him from entering combat. The Marine Corps had enacted a regulation on October 23, 1950 stating that any Marine suffering two or more wounds in World War II or Korea was to be removed from fighting. The first sergeant in question, however, was overruled after Ireland appealed to the Commandant of the Marine Corps, General Clifton B. Cates, in Washington, D.C.

After "two days of talking and waiting," Ireland's request for combat duty was accepted, and by January 7, 1951 he was en route to the West Coast "preparatory to joining his Marine buddies" in the Korean War. General Cates was later quoted in Time magazine as stating: "If the sergeant wants to fight, let him fight." At the time, Ireland held the rank of corporal. His mother, Katherine, first objected when he wanted to fight again, but as Ireland later told the press: "I explained to her we had another job to do and it would take a lot of men," and this changed her mind. Both the Associated Press and New York Times reported on Ireland's efforts to return to combat duty.

Ireland flew from Washington to San Francisco and then departed for Korea. In Korea, he commanded an infantry rocket unit, serving as a squad leader with Company I, 3rd Battalion, 5th Marines. On September 26, 1951, Ireland's patrol was ambushed by North Korean soldiers while searching for a break in a communication line; he ordered his men to take cover and, "expressing complete disregard for his personal safety," he "fearlessly crawled toward the hostile troops." Then, "with grenades and rifle fire," Ireland "single-handedly killed several of the enemy and forced the remainder to withdraw,” remaining in his position while the wiremen fixed the communication line. For this action, Ireland was awarded the Bronze Star.

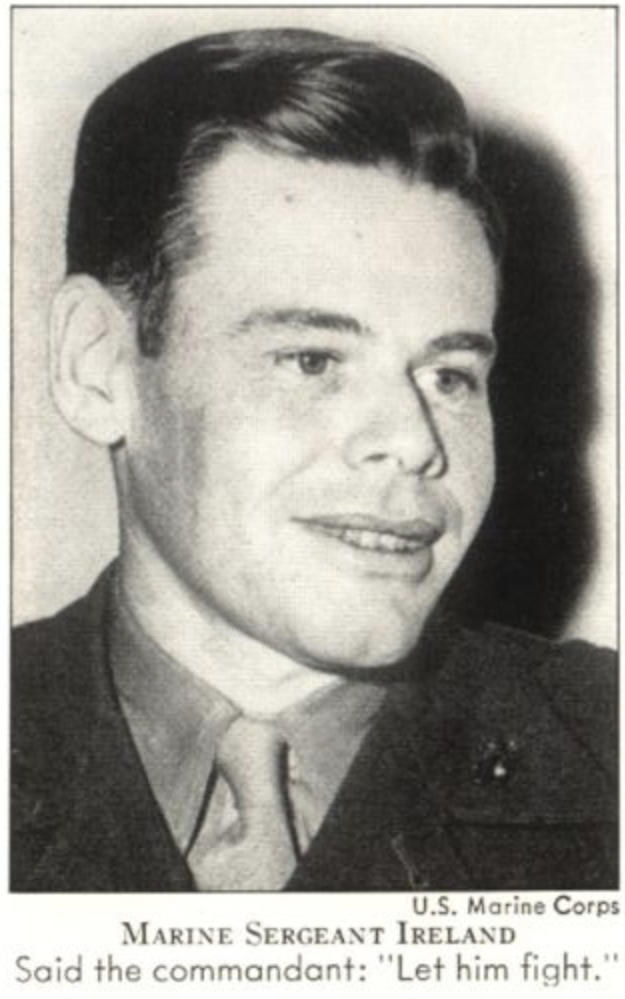
Ireland in Time magazine, July 1953

In December 1951, after he had suffered shrapnel to the neck and mortar fragments to the face, the Marine Corps decided to ship him home, despite his continued desire to serve in combat. His final wound, shrapnel to the eye and face on December 29, 1951, was severe enough for him to be medically discharged. Ireland's other Korean wounds occurred on June 2, July 2, and July 7, 1951, and he also suffered frostbite in Korea. As a result of his Korean War wounds, Ireland earned four Purple Hearts, having been injured in the leg, hand, neck, and face.

=== End of military service ===
In 1953, Ireland was honorably discharged from the Marine Corps, having served a total of twelve years in the military. In addition to his Purple Hearts, he earned two Bronze Star Medals—with Combat "V" device—and campaign and service medals with eight battle stars. Ireland required five blood transfusions over the course of his military career.

In July 1953, Time magazine ran a piece on Ireland titled "Fighting Man," detailing his military career, Purple Heart awards, and appeal to General Cates to allow him to fight in Korea. On July 27, 1953, the day the Korean Armistice was signed, the New York Daily News printed his remarks on the event: "If it's real, I feel great and so will the guys up at the front. I hope there's no mickey in it, though."

In September 1953, the St. Louis Post-Dispatch reported on Ireland meeting Secretary of the Navy Robert B. Anderson. Ireland was speaking at an American Legion convention banquet in St. Louis where Lewis K. Gough, national commander of the American Legion, was also present. The Post-Dispatch described Ireland as "America's most wounded veteran." When he was 47 years old, Ireland again volunteered to serve in the Vietnam War, but the Marine Corps refused his request.

Ireland's December 1945 Report of Separation from the Marine Corps

== Teaching career, coaching, and veteran organizations ==
Ireland participated in several veteran organizations, and was a member of both the Military Order of the Purple Heart and American Legion. He also founded the Marine Corps League unit in the city of Poughkeepsie, New York, and was elected commandant of the league's New York department in July 1965.

Ireland was a teacher and coach for the New York City Board of Education. He taught science and coached judo, boxing, and wrestling at the High School of Art and Design in Manhattan, guiding the school's under-equipped wrestling team to the NYC Public School Athletic Wrestling Championship. Although his team was "plagued by the lack of practice facilities," it nonetheless defeated twenty-two other squads and won the championship. He also taught at the Bay Ridge High School in Brooklyn, where he likewise taught science. In total, Ireland spent over two decades as a teacher.

His military Report of Separation states that before joining the Marines in World War II his employer was the Hudson River Stone Corp. of Cold Spring. The separation report following his Korean service lists his main civilian occupation as a reporter for the Putnam County News.

=== 1976 mugging attack ===
In November 1976, while working as a teacher at the High School of Art and Design, Ireland witnessed a student "being mugged by three men" and decided to intervene. He suffered serious harm during the incident and was hospitalized. As reported by the New York Times, the muggers involved were later arrested.

The December 26, 1976 issue of the Poughkeepsie Journal ran an interview with Ireland and described the details of the attack. Ireland, 58 years old at the time, was "assaulted from behind" as he "tried to break up a mugging in the school area," enduring a "cerebral concussion, possible brain damage, post-concussion syndromes and back and neck injuries." During the interview, given at the Castle Point Veterans Affairs hospital, Ireland expressed doubt that he could ever coach judo again, but felt confident that he could continue with boxing and wrestling. On June 29, 1979, the New York Times reported that the New York City Police Department had formally recognized Ireland for this "distinguished" act of public service, commending him "for coming to the rescue of a student."

== Later years and death ==
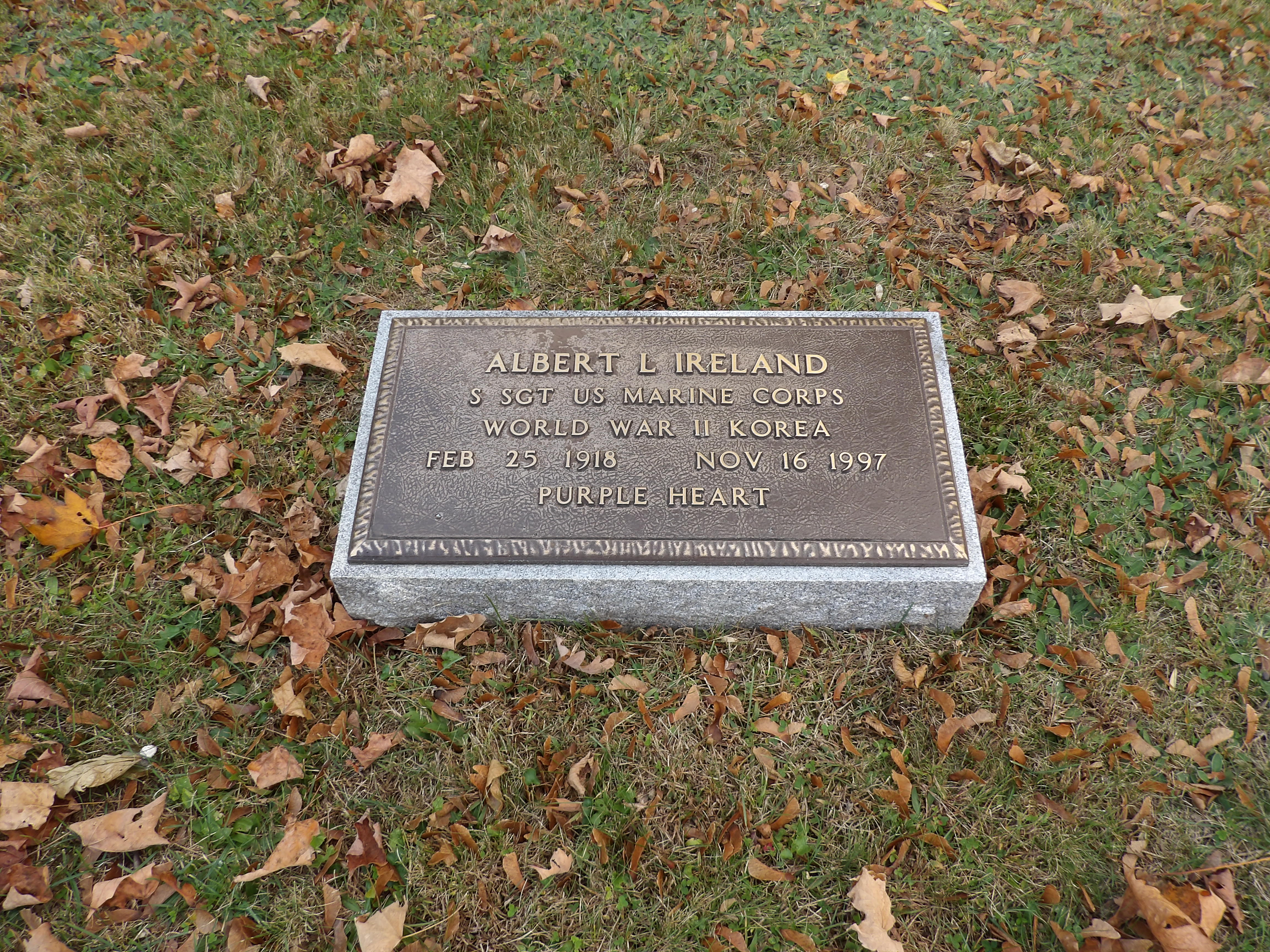
Ireland's resting place at the Cold Spring Cemetery in Philipstown, New York

In his later years, Ireland lived in Kansas. He moved from Dodge City, Kansas to Great Bend in 1991, and died in Larned on November 16, 1997 at the Central Kansas Medical Center, Saint Joseph Campus.

Ireland was interred next to his mother and father in the Cold Spring Cemetery in Philipstown, New York, just outside the Village of Cold Spring, on Saturday, November 13, 2004 during a memorial service attended by about 75 people; his remains had been held by family members since his death. Declining to bury him at Arlington National Cemetery, the family instead chose his hometown for burial. The following Monday, Cold Spring Mayor Anthony Phillips stated in an interview that he was "very grateful to the family for allowing him to be placed in our community. It was important." Phillips had first contacted the family several years earlier, hoping they would agree to return Ireland's remains home. New York State Senator Vincent Leibell, III and Assemblywoman Sandra Galef were present at Ireland's memorial service, along with "United States Marines from Stewart Air Force Base, including a firing squad."

=== Memorials and tributes ===
A section of New York State Route 301 was named after Ireland on August 20, 2002. On May 14, 2015, the Putnam County Sheriff's Department christened one of their Marine Patrol Boats the SPB Albert L. Ireland. The boat, a 24-foot Boston Whaler made in 2013, patrolled the Hudson River until the county ended river patrols in 2021.

== Military awards and decorations ==

Bronze Star Medal w/ "V" Device & 1 gold service star	Purple Heart w/ 1 silver service star and 3 bronze service stars	American Defense Service Medal
American Campaign Medal	Asiatic-Pacific Campaign Medal w/ 2 bronze service stars	World War II Victory Medal
National Defense Service Medal	Korean Service Medal w/ 1 bronze service star	United Nations Korea Medal
