= Phi Epsilon Kappa =

American professional fraternity for exercise science

- ΦΕΚ
- Founded: April 12, 1913; 113 years ago Normal College of the American Gymnastics Union
- Type: Professional
- Former affiliation: PFA
- Status: Active
- Emphasis: Physical Education
- Scope: National
- Motto: "A Sound Mind in a Sound Body"
- Colors: Black and Gold
- Symbol: Winged foot
- Flower: Daisy
- Publication: The Black and Gold Bulletin
- Chapters: 85 active
- Headquarters: Phi Epsilon Kappa c/o David Lorenzi; 239 Zink Hall, IUP; Indiana, Pennsylvania 15705; United States
- Website: www.phiepsilonkappa.org

Phi Epsilon Kappa (ΦΕΚ) is a national professional fraternity for persons engaged in or pursuing careers in the fields of physical education, health, recreation, dance, human performance, exercise science, sports medicine, and sports management.

== History ==
Phi Epsilon Kappa was founded on April 12, 1913, at the Normal College of the American Gymnastics Union in Indianapolis, Indiana. In 1920, the second charter, Beta, was granted to the American College of Physical Education (Chicago, Illinois), whose charter was later moved to DePaul University when that institution assimilated American College.

Phi Epsilon Kappa extended membership to women beginning in 1975.

Since its founding, Phi Epsilon Kappa has installed over one hundred collegiate chapters and twenty-three alumni chapters.

Phi Epsilon Kappa joined the Professional Interfraternity Conference in 1928, remaining a member of the PIC through at least 1968. However, Baird's Manual of 1991 lists them as an independent professional fraternity.

== Objectives ==
The national fraternity notes seven objectives:

- To be organized and operated exclusively for educational and charitable purposes as a non-profit organization dedicated to advancement of those educational interest areas of Physical Education, Health, Recreation, Dance, Human Performance, Exercise Science, Sports Medicine, and Sports Management.
- To foster scientific research.
- To facilitate the exchange of information and experience gained in the various countries of the world including programs, methods, techniques, materials, training and research.
- To provide a medium through which the membership can contribute to the advancement of the profession.
- To publish periodicals to be distributed to members and to the general public for the purpose of disseminating information about the corporation, the membership, and the profession.
- To make awards for outstanding work.
- To foster a spirit of loyalty and fraternity and bonds of fellowship and mutual assistance.

== Symbols and traditions ==
The motto of Phi Epsilon Kappa is "A Sound Mind in a Sound Body." "Its badge is a shield bordered by fourteen pearls, in honor of the fourteen charter members. The pledge pin is a winged foot, symbolic of the profession. The fraternity's flower is a daisy. Its colors are black and gold.

Its principal publication of the Fraternity is The Physical Educator, a professional journal published four times annually and originally published in 1940. The Fraternity's esoteric manual is Black and Gold, published three times annually.

== Notable members ==
- Albert L. Ireland, decorated United States Marine
- Bud Morse, professional baseball player

== See also ==
- Professional fraternities and sororities
