= Astanlı, Yardymli =

Village in Yardymli, Azerbaijan

Coordinates: 39.0441°N 48.38°E

Astanlı is a village in the municipality of Aşağı Astanlı in the Yardymli Rayon of Azerbaijan.
