= Jim Considine =

Australian rules footballer, born 1902

Personal information
- Full name: James Patrick Considine
- Born: 18 June 1902; Footscray, Victoria
- Died: 13 April 1987 (aged 84); Yarraville, Victoria
- Original team: Footscray Reserves

Playing career^{1}
Years	Club	Games (Goals)
1926	Footscray	4 (1)
- ^{1} Playing statistics correct to the end of 1926.

James Patrick Considine (18 June 1902 – 13 April 1987) was an Australian rules footballer who played with Footscray in the Victorian Football League (VFL).
