= Jean-Baptiste Doumeng =

French businessman (1919–1987)

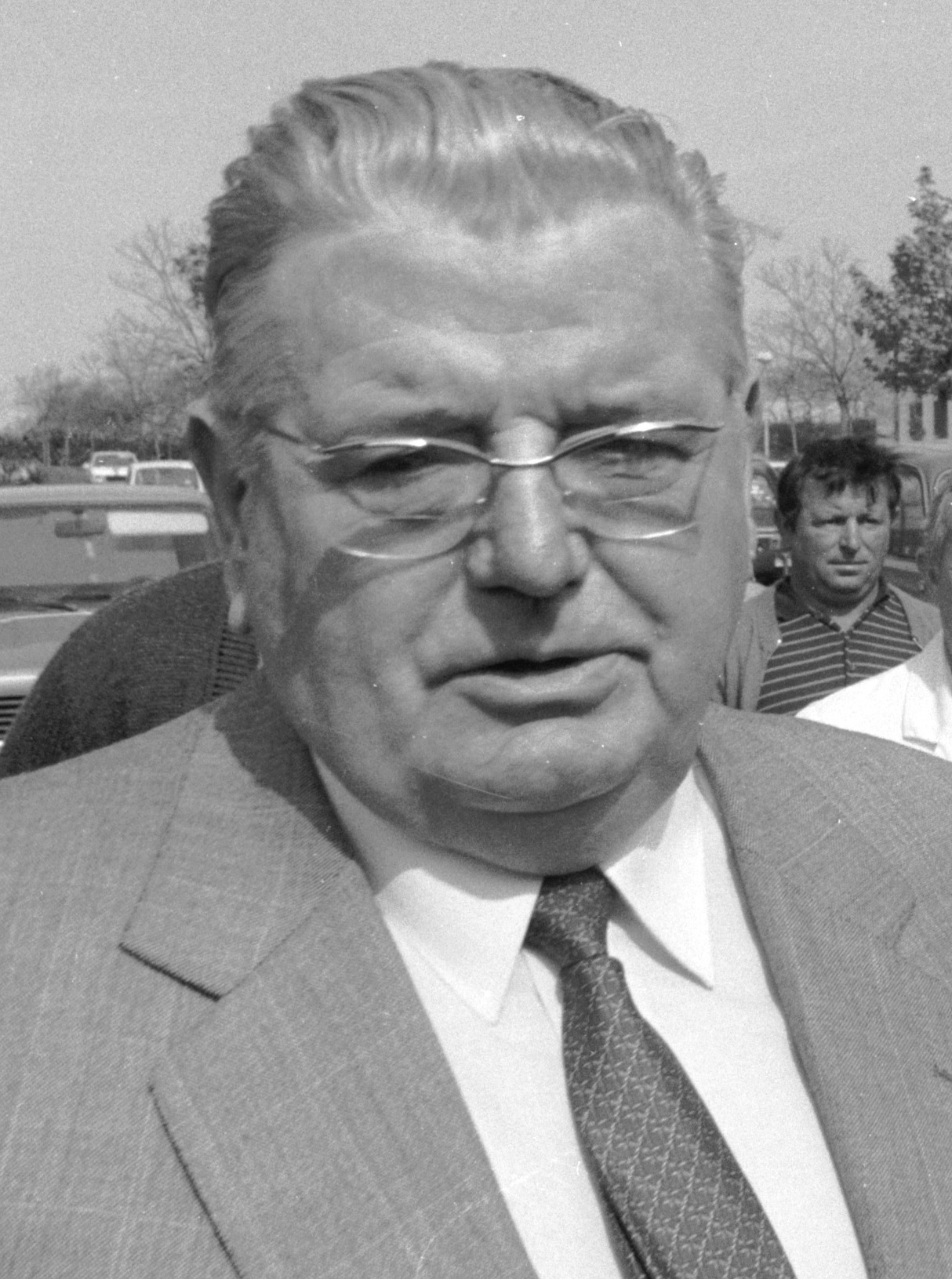
- Doumeng in 1983
- Born: 2 December 1919; Lavernose-Lacasse, France
- Died: 6 April 1987 (aged 67); Noé, France
- Other name: The Red Billionaire
- Occupations: Businessman; Politician
- Political party: French Communist Party
- Spouse: Denise Trinqué (m. 1941)

Mayor of Noé
- In office 1959–1977

Jean-Baptiste Doumeng (2 December 1919 – 6 April 1987) was a French businessman and politician. He became known as "The Red Billionaire" for his communist beliefs and business deals with Eastern Bloc nations.

Raised in poverty, he joined the French Communist Party at 16. He performed his first trade, French potatoes for tractors, with Czechoslovakia, after learning that they were willing to trade their tractors for food. He later formed the Union des Cooperatives Agricoles du Sud Ouest (Ucaso). In 1947, Doumeng founded Interagra and performed many trades with Eastern Bloc nations, including Russia and Vietnam.

After battling an illness for several months, Doumeng died at his home in 1987.

== Early life ==
Doumeng was born in Lavernose-Lacasse, France, on 2 December 1919, to sharecropper Louis Doumeng and Léontine Berges. Doumeng grew up in poverty. He stopped attending school at 12 due to his inability to obtain a scholarship, as a result from his father's land ownership; the maximum was 5 hectares (12 acres). In order to make a living, he helped his father on his farm.

Appalled by his living conditions, he became interested in the writings of socialists such as Nikolai Bukharin and Karl Marx. He later joined the French Communist Party at 16. He served briefly as an officer during World War II after forging a high school certificate. Afterwards, he partaked in the French Resistance.

On 25 October 1941, Doumeng married Denise Trinqué.

== Business career ==
Shortly after the war, he moved to Paris and met Charles Hilsum, who at the time was the head of the Soviet-controlled Banque Commerciale pour l’Europe du Nord (BCEN). Doumeng learned from Hilsum that Czechoslovakia was willing to sell surplus tractors for food. With help from the bank, Doumeng was able to exchange French potatoes for tractors.

He later brought together many southwestern French agriculture cooperatives and formed the Union des Cooperatives Agricoles du Sud Ouest (Ucaso). Doumeng provided Ucaso with tractors and animal food imported from Eastern Europe in exchange for agriculture products.

=== Interagra ===
Doumeng founded Interagra in 1947. The company was owned 30% by Ucaso and 70% by Doumeng and his two sons. The main business of Interagra was selling surplus goods of the European Economic Community to Eastern Bloc nations, mainly the Soviet Union.

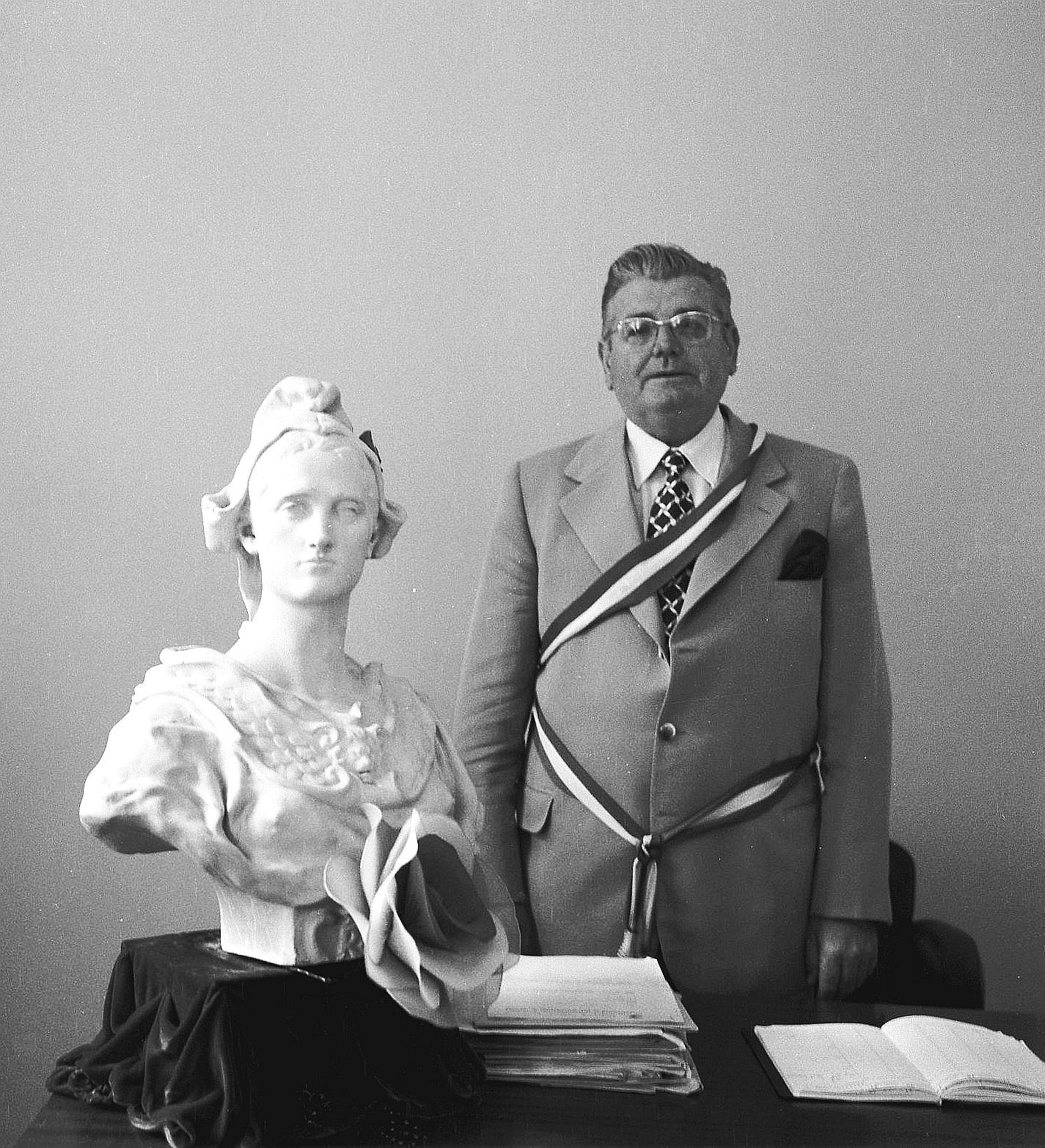
Doumeng in 1974

In 1973, Interagra received attention after selling approximately 200 thousand tons of butter to the Soviet Union. In an interview, Doumeng claimed this move was altruistic, alleging that he "may never get anything out of this," but that "the important thing is that the butter has been moved and this is good for the farmers." Shortly after the deal, it was reported that Russia was slated to sell 50 thousand tons of the butter they bought to Chile.

Leadership of the company was taken over by Doumeng's son, Michel, following his death. Later, the Soviet Union and France signed a grain deal with $280 million (1988 USD). Under this deal, Interagra was expected to give 2 million tonnes of French cereals.

Interagra bought 200,000 tons of sugar from Cuba in 1992. The following year, it was reported that Interagra had debts of up to $93 million and was later liquidated.

== Death ==
Doumeng died on 6 April 1987, at his home in Noé after battling a months-long illness. In his honor, Fidel Castro sent wreaths to Doumeng's funeral. All of Doumeng's wealth was given to his wife.

Doumeng's son, Michel, succeeded him to become chairman of Interagra.
