= Astanlı, Jalilabad =

Astanlı
- Municipality
- Location within Azerbaijan
- Coordinates: 39°09′18″N 48°25′02″E
- Country: Azerbaijan
- Rayon: Jalilabad

Population
  - Total: 560
- Time zone: UTC+4 (AZT)

Astanlı (also, Astanly) is a village and municipality in the Jalilabad Rayon of Azerbaijan. It has a population of 560.
