= Mary Paischeff =

Finnish ballet dancer

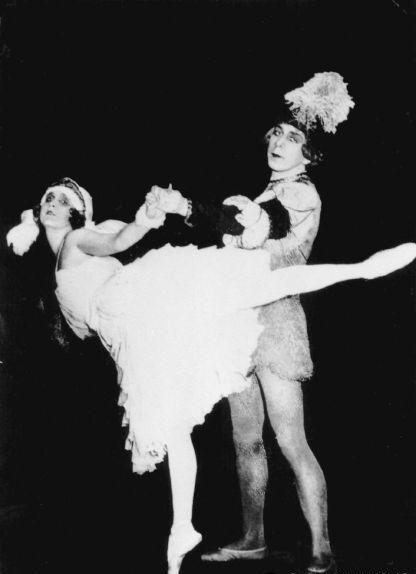
- Mary Paischeff on stage with George Gé
- Born: 6 August 1899; Vyborg, Grand Duchy of Finland
- Died: 7 November 1975 (aged 76); Helsinki, Finland

Mary Paischeff (6 August 1899 — 7 November 1975) was a Finnish ballet dancer, notable for being the first contracted dancer of the ballet section of the Opera of Finland (later to become the Finnish National Ballet), as well as the company's first principal dancer.

She danced the lead role in the first fully Finnish ballet production, as Odette/Odile in Swan Lake, opposite George Gé, which premiered on 17 January 1922.

Paischeff trained in Petrograd in Russia, moving back to Finland after the start of the Russian Revolution.

She opened her own ballet school in Helsinki in 1932, and also taught dance at the city's Swedish Theatre.

In 1972, Paischeff was elected the first chairperson of the newly established Pro Dance Association.

Paischeff was awarded the Pro Finlandia medal of the Order of the Lion of Finland in 1956.
