= Yuxarı Astanlı =

- Location within Azerbaijan
- Coordinates: 39°01′N 48°23′E
- Country: Azerbaijan
- Rayon: Yardymli
- Time zone: UTC+4 (AZT)

Yuxarı Astanlı (also, Yukhary Astanly and Verkhniye Astanly) is a village in the Yardymli Rayon of Azerbaijan.
