= Aşağı Astanlı =

- Municipality
- Location within Azerbaijan
- Coordinates: 39°02′39″N 48°22′48″E
- Country: Azerbaijan
- Rayon: Yardymli

Population
  - Total: 890
- Time zone: UTC+4 (AZT)
  - Summer (DST): UTC+5 (AZT)

Aşağı Astanlı (also, Ashagy Astanly and Nizhniye Astanly) is a village and municipality in the Yardymli Rayon of Azerbaijan. It has a population of 890. The municipality consists of the villages of Aşağı Astanlı, Astanlı, and Musa.
