= Musa, Attock =

Basti Musa
- Village
- Location within Pakistan
- Coordinates: 33°52′59″N 72°29′31″E
- Country: Pakistan
- Province: Punjab
- District: Attock
- Tehsil: Hazro
- Region: Chhachh
- Time zone: UTC+5 (PST)

Musa is the second largest village in Harzo Chaach, located in the northern part of Attock, in the Punjab Province of Pakistan.

The village is located 2 km from Hazro. It is famous for its peanuts, the main crop of the village.
