= Nehzatabad, Kerman =

Nehzatabad نهضت اباد
- Village
- Location within Iran
- Coordinates: 30°25′30″N 57°19′04″E
- Country: Iran
- Province: Kerman
- County: Kerman
- Bakhsh: Central
- Rural District: Derakhtengan

Population (2006)
  - Total: 59
- Time zone: UTC+3:30 (IRST)
  - Summer (DST): UTC+4:30 (IRDT)

Nehzatabad (Persian: نهضت اباد, also Romanized as Nehẕatābād; also known as Deh-e Moḩammad Shāh and Mūsa) is a village in Derakhtengan Rural District, in the Central District of Kerman County, Kerman Province, Iran. At the 2006 census, its population was 59, in 17 families.
