= Philip Pritchard =

Australian hockey player

Personal information
- Nationality: Australian
- Born: 10 November 1932 Manjimup, Australia
- Died: 13 April 1987 (aged 54)

Sport
- Sport: Field hockey

Philip Pritchard (10 November 1932 – 13 April 1987) was an Australian field hockey player. He competed in the men's tournament at the 1960 Summer Olympics.
