= Astanlı, Neftchala =

Astanlı
- Municipality
- Location within Azerbaijan
- Coordinates: 39°26′N 49°04′E
- Country: Azerbaijan
- Rayon: Neftchala

Population
  - Total: 965
- Time zone: UTC+4 (AZT)
  - Summer (DST): UTC+5 (AZT)

Astanlı (or Astanly) is a village and municipality in the Neftchala Rayon of Azerbaijan. It has a population of 965.
