= Bud Morse =

American baseball player (1904-1987)

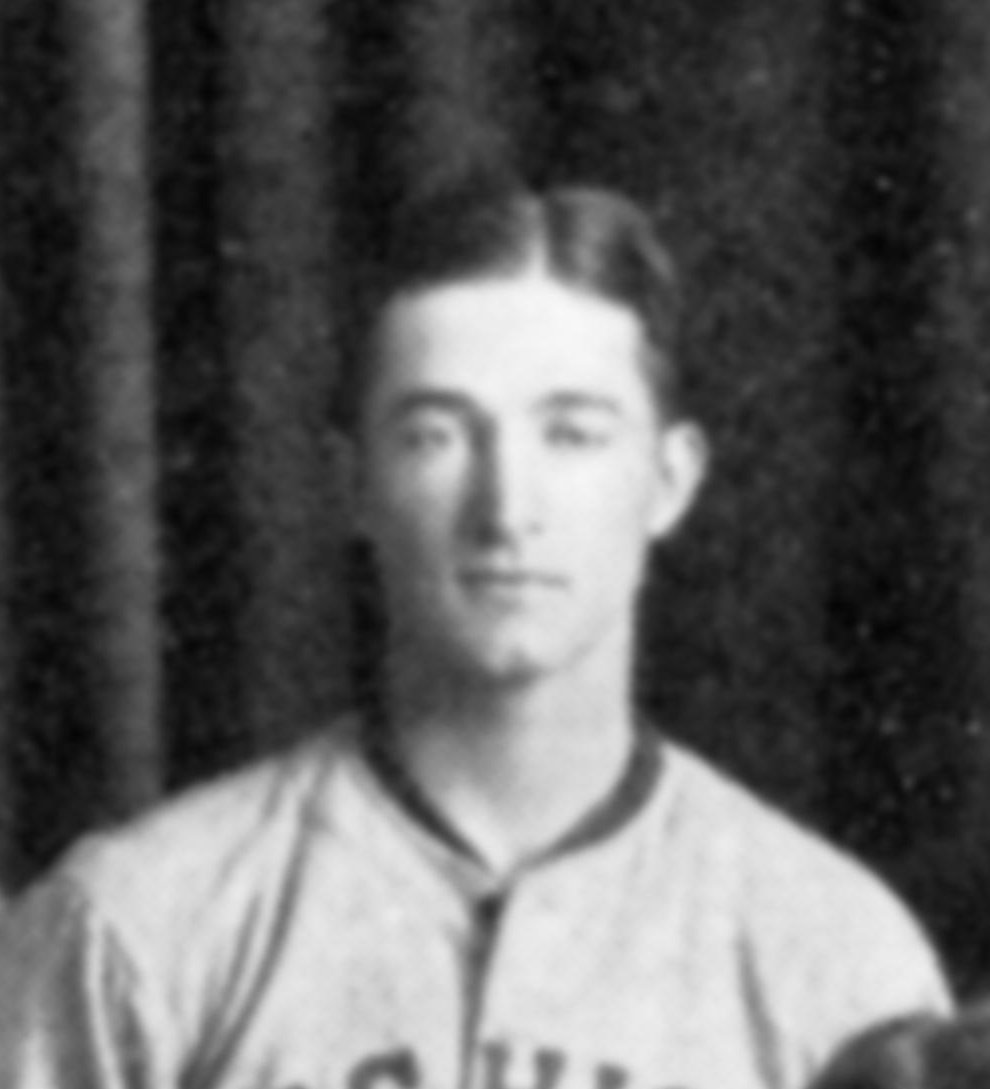
- Second baseman
- Born: September 4, 1904; Berkeley, California, U.S.
- Died: April 6, 1987 (aged 82); Sparks, Nevada, U.S.
- Batted: Left Threw: Right

MLB debut
- September 14, 1929, for the Philadelphia Athletics

Last MLB appearance
- September 29, 1929, for the Philadelphia Athletics

MLB statistics
- Games played: 8
- At bats: 27
- Hits: 2
- Stats at Baseball Reference

Teams
- Philadelphia Athletics (1929)

Newell Obediah "Bud" Morse, Sr. (September 4, 1904 – April 6, 1987) was an American baseball second baseman and attorney. He played college baseball for the University of Michigan and played Major League Baseball for the 1929 Philadelphia Athletics team that won the 1929 World Series and is considered one of the greatest baseball teams in history. He later practiced as an attorney in California and Nevada. In 1957, he was recognized by the Governor of Nevada for "exceptional acts of heroism" in disarming a gunman who had run amok in the Reno, Nevada veterans' hospital, killing two persons and injuring a third.

== Early years ==
Morse was born in Berkeley, California. His father, Newell O. Morse, Sr., was a native of Maine who managed and later owned a stationery and book store in Berkeley. At the time of the 1910 and 1920 United States censuses, Morse was living in Berkeley with his parents, an older brother Paul, and a younger sister Helen.

Morse enrolled at the University of California, Berkeley in 1922. He was a member of the Alpha Delta Phi fraternity at Berkeley. According to the university's 1924 and 1925 yearbooks, Morse played for the California Golden Bears baseball team coached by former major league pitcher Carl Zamloch. Morse was listed as a five-foot, nine inch, 143 pound left fielder.

Morse transferred to the University of Michigan where he graduated in 1928 with a bachelor of science degree in education. and played for the Michigan Wolverines baseball team. He was a member of the Phi Epsilon Kappa National Honorary Physical Education Fraternity at Michigan. In 1956, Michigan's long-time baseball coach Ray Fisher selected his all-time Michigan baseball team and named Morse as one of two second basemen (along with Buck Giles).

After leaving Michigan, returned to Berkeley to attend law school. He also played college baseball for Berkeley in 1929. He reportedly delayed his matriculation into Boalt Hall law school when he signed with the Philadelphia Athletics.

== Professional baseball ==
In early June 1929, and just out of college, Morse was signed with the San Francisco Mission Reds of the Pacific Coast League. Although he had played second base in college, the Mission Reds signed Morse to replace their injured shortstop. The Sporting News reported: "He is said to have done a splendid job, considering his lack of experience." Morse appeared in 21 games for the Missionaries and compiled a .250 batting average. On June 22, 1929, Morse was sold to the Des Moines Demons in the Western League. Morse played a few games at shortstop for the Demons, but was quickly shifted to his natural position at second base where, according to The Sporting News, "he immediately became a star." He appeared in 76 games for the Demons and compiled a .302 batting average.

On August 31, 1929, Morse was sold to Connie Mack's 1929 Philadelphia Athletics. The sale came about through the efforts of Des Moines team's president Lee Keyser. According to a press account, "Morse looked so big leaguish in his work at the keystone sack" that Keyser took a train to St. Louis when the Athletics were playing the St. Louis Browns. Keyser told Mack about Morse, and Mack acquired Morse on Keyser's recommendation without seeing Morse. The New York Yankees were also reported to be "keenly interested" in signing Morse, "but apparently the Athletics outbid them."

Morse had the good fortune of joining a team that is considered "one of the greatest baseball teams ever assembled." The 1929 Athletics included five Hall of Famers (Mickey Cochrane, Jimmie Foxx, Al Simmons, Eddie Collins and Lefty Grove), compiled a 104-46 record and defeated the Chicago Cubs in the 1929 World Series. Manager Connie Mack used Morse to relieve the team's regular second baseman, Max Bishop. Morse made his major league debut on September 14, 1929, and appeared in eight games during the last two weeks of the regular season. He compiled an .074 batting average with two hits in 27 at-bats. In early October 1929, The Sporting News reported on Morse's progress: "Morse is fielding excellently and has won favor from Mack, but as yet the Californian has not found his batting stride."

After the 1929 season, the Athletics released Morse back to Des Moines. The Sporting News called him a "promising young player" and reported: "He proved a capital fielder, but was a little shy with the bat."

In 1930, Morse appeared in 13 games for the Dallas Steers (Texas League) and Minneapolis Millers (American Association).

== Family and later years ==
After retiring from baseball, Morse returned to the University of California's Boalt Hall law school. After graduating from law school, he formed a law partnership with his brother Paul D. Morse. In February 1936, Morse married Berniece H. Wright at Carmel, California. They met in 1931 when both were employed as playground supervisors for the Berkeley Recreation Department. At the time of the marriage, Morse was an attorney in Oakland, California.

Morse later worked as an attorney at the veteran's hospital in Reno, Nevada. In 1957, he gained attention when he disarmed a former security guard who had run amok in the hospital with a shotgun. The disgruntled former employee killed two hospital employees and shot a third person before Morse disarmed him "in a wild battle in a corridor." The Reno Evening Gazette wrote: "He might have killed Harrison, but hospital attorney Newell Morse, 53, caught Eaton's revolver hand from behind. Two revolver shots hit the wall. Morse then hit Eaton with a right haymaker. Eaton went down. Harrison and Morse disarmed him and held him until the arrival of police. Policemen ... found Eaton battered and bloody, in the hand of Morse and Harrison." One month later, Nevada Governor Charles H. Russell presented Morse a gold medal for "exceptional acts of heroism" in capturing and disarming the gunman.

In 1987, Morse died in Sparks, Nevada at age 82.
