= Musa, Azerbaijan =

Coordinates: 39°01′N 48°23′E

Musa is a village in the municipality of Aşağı Astanlı in the Yardymli Rayon of Azerbaijan. According to Azerbaijan's State Statistics Committee, only eight people lived in the village as of 2014.
