= Philip Edwards (cricketer) =

English cricketer

Philip George Edwards (6 December 1906 – 3 April 1987) was an English first-class cricketer active 1930–33 who played for Middlesex. He was born in Hoxton; died in Hampstead.
