= Musa connector =

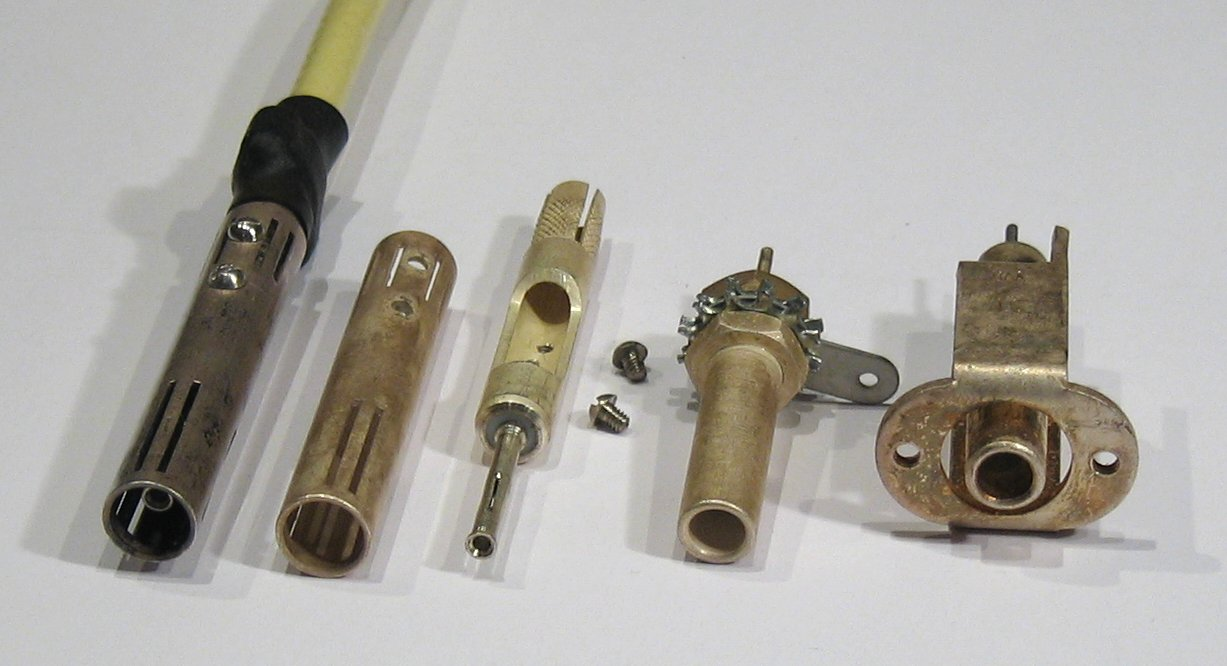
From left to right: assembled cable mounted Musa socket, socket components, two types of panel mounted plug

The Musa connector (for Multiple Unit Steerable Array/Antenna) is a type of coaxial ("coax") connector, originally developed for the manual switching of radio signals. It has a characteristic impedance of 75 Ω, and was adopted for use in the emerging television broadcast industry.

== History ==
"Multiple Unit Steerable Antenna" refers to an array of rhombic antennas used for high frequency (3–30 MHz) trans-Atlantic communication, "steerable" by the act of connecting several antennas together via a phasing circuit, thus achieving maximum antenna gain in the required direction. The Musa connector was developed by the British Post Office, as a reliable and readily deployed means of achieving the desired configuration.

Some time after commercial television appeared around 1936, the Musa connector came to be used as a standard video connector; its distinctive feature being that unlike most other types of coaxial connector, it is engaged and disengaged by a straight push-pull action, making it ideal for patch bays. In such professional telecommunications and video applications, the connector performed well until the end of analogue (525 or 625 line) television.

The Musa connector was designed as to be rugged and reliable, typically using solid sterling silver contacts, and turned silver-plated brass or phosphor bronze bodies. In consumer products, much less expensive connectors, such as the Belling Lee coax connector, have performed the same function.

== Modern use ==
Use of 75 Ω impedance as the standard for video broadcast equipment may be largely due to the better wideband performance obtainable from 75 Ω than 50 Ω cable of similar physical size, and is generally less expensive. The historical choice of 75 Ω has turned out to be advantageous with the latest technology.

Often, 75 Ω BNC connectors are used, however these are not freely pluggable like MUSA connectors, due to the bayonet locking action, except for specially engineered patch panels which omit the bayonet function, just relying upon the friction of the connector's mating surfaces.
