= Wenike Opurum Briggs =

Nigerian lawyer and politician

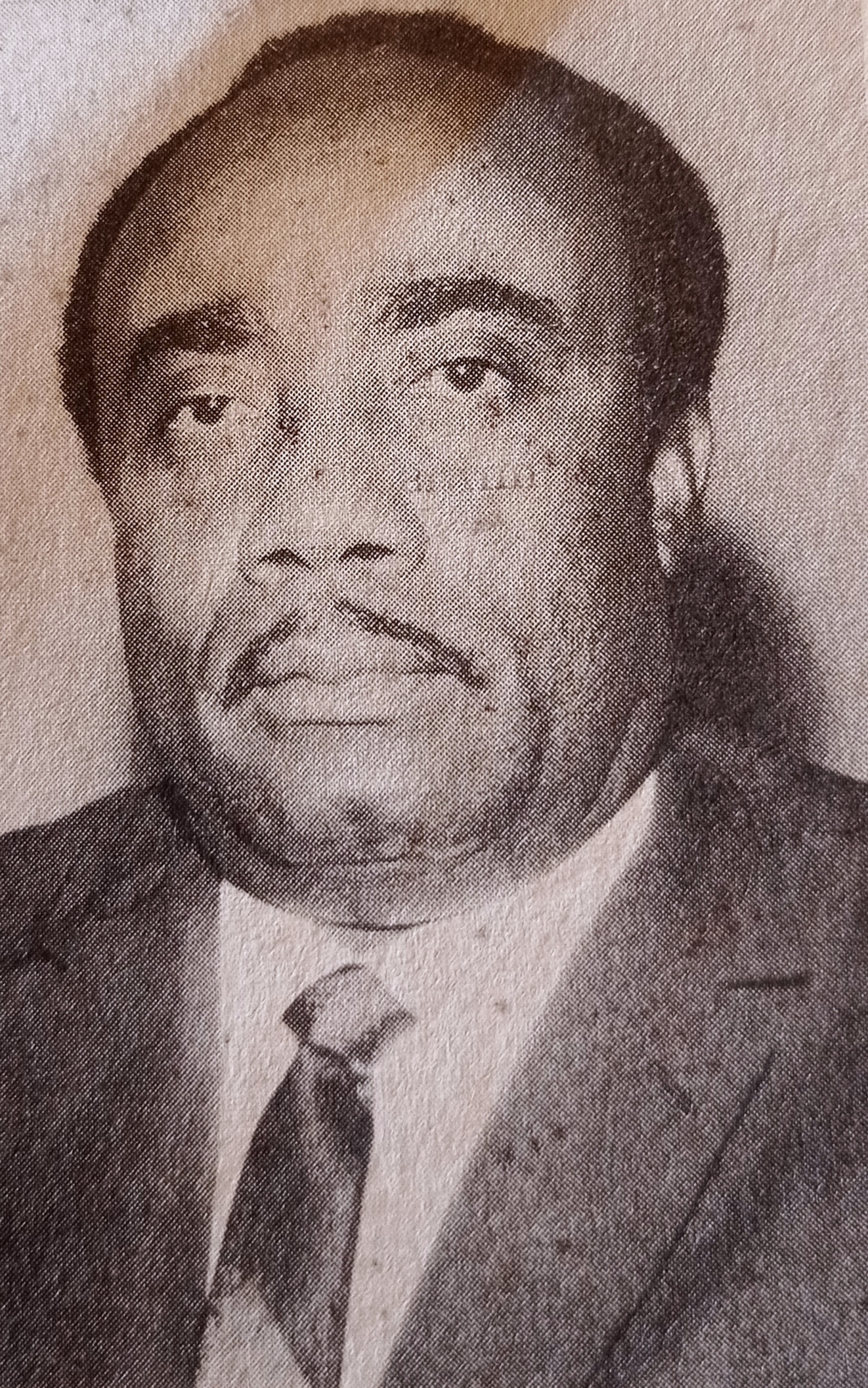
- Born: March 10, 1918; Abonnema
- Died: April 21, 1987 (aged 69)
- Spouse: Agnes Alaerebola

Wenike Opurum Briggs (10 March 1918 – 21 April 1987) was a Nigerian lawyer, journalist and politician who advocated for the creation of more states in Nigeria. He served as a minister in General Yakubu Gowon's administration.

== Early life ==
Wenike Opurum Briggs was born on 10 March 1918 in Abonnema, Rivers State. He was the son of Abel Opurum Briggs who was a trader and Madam Obuta Dafinasi Oruwari.

== Education ==
He began his early schooling at Nyemoni Primary School, Abonnema and then attended King's College Lagos. He worked for some time before he went to study journalism in 1951 at Regent Street Polytechnic, London, where he obtained a Diploma. He then took up Legal Studies, and after obtaining a LLB from the University of Sheffield, England, he was called to the Bar at Gray's Inn, London in 1958.

== Career ==
After his post-primary education at King's College Lagos, Wenike Opurum Briggs began earning a living as a Postal Clerk and Telegraphist with the Department of Posts and Telegraphs. From 1942 to 1945, he worke as a Customs Officer in the Department of Customs and Excise. He joined the Daily Service in 1945 as a sub-editor. Before the end of 1947 Wenike started his own weekly newspaper, The Nigerian Statesman. On his return to Nigeria from Britain in 1958, he established his legal practice in Port Harcourt.

== Politics ==
He joined the Nigerian Youth Movement in 1944. Between 1942 and 1945 which he spent working with the Daily Service he underwent his political and journalistic apprenticeship while serving under Chief Samuel Ladoke Akintola. After starting his own weekly, The Nigerian Statesman in 1947 as its editor, he also became the secretary general of the Lagos branch of the Nigeria Youth Movement and joined the team of journalists representing the West African press who were invited by the Colonial Office for a tour of Britain. At the end of the tour, he used the opportunity to further his studies from 1951 to 1958. While Briggs was in Britain he joined the United Nigeria Committee whose members advocated for the creation of more States and becoming its secretary general. Returning to Nigeria, Wenike Briggs established his legal practice in Port Harcourt and also worked for COR(Calabar, Ogoja, Rivers) State Movement as its secretary general. He was elected parliamentary member of Degema Division in 1959, under a party in alliance with Action Group(AG) of Chief Obafemi Awolowo. He was re-elected in 1964 under the platform of the United Progressive Grand Alliance(UPGA) which was an alliance of the National Council of Nigerian Citizens (NCNC) and the AG. He retained his parliamentary seat until the military took over in 1966, when undaunted by the civil strife, including a short arrest in Biafra, he was soon back in Lagos advocating for more States. In October 1967, he was appointed as the Minister for Education by General Yakubu Gowon and then as Minister for Trade from 1971 to 1974.

== Later life and death ==
Wenike Opurum Briggs did not take active part in Nigeria's politics after 1974, though he did live to see the creation of more states. He died on 21 April 1987.

== Personal life ==
He was married to Agnes Alaerebola and had three children only, namely Hon. Taribo Wenike O. Briggs (JP) (First Son), Barrister Kroma Wenike O. Briggs (Second son) and Mr Amame Wenike O. Briggs (Third son).
