= Gordon Bennetts =

Australian cricketer

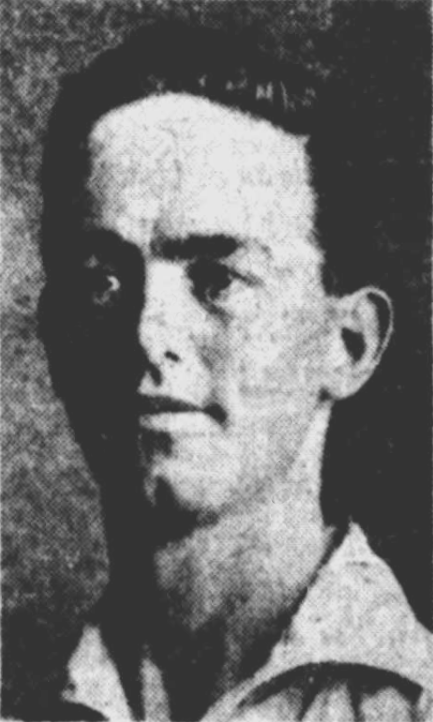

Personal information
- Born: 26 March 1909; Wellington, New South Wales, Australia
- Died: 4 April 1987 (aged 78); Geelong, Australia

Domestic team information
- Years: Team
- 1929: Victoria
- Source: Cricinfo, 21 November 2015

Gordon Bennetts (26 March 1909 – 4 April 1987) was an Australian cricketer. He played one first-class cricket match for Victoria in 1929.

== See also ==
- List of Victoria first-class cricketers
