= John Nunn (cricketer) =

English cricketer

John Ayscough Nunn (19 March 1906 – 6 April 1987) was an English first-class cricketer active 1926–1946 who played for Middlesex and Oxford University. He was born in Hadley, Barnet, Hertfordshire; died in Colintraive, Argyll.
