= Joe Casey (pitcher) =

- Pitcher
- Born: July 1, 1900; Blackwell, Missouri, U.S.
- Died: April 3, 1987 (aged 86); South Bend, Indiana, U.S.
- Batted: Unknown Threw: Left

Negro league baseball debut
- 1920, for the St. Louis Giants

Last appearance
- 1921, for the Cleveland Tate Stars
- Stats at Baseball Reference

Teams
- St. Louis Giants (1920); Cleveland Tate Stars (1921)

Joseph Sylvester Casey (July 1, 1900 – April 3, 1987) was an American professional baseball pitcher in the Negro leagues. He played with the St. Louis Giants in 1920 and the Cleveland Tate Stars in 1921.
