= Reg Davies (Australian footballer) =

Australian rules footballer (1909–1987)

Personal information
- Full name: Reg Davies
- Born: 24 November 1909; Treherbert, Wales
- Died: 10 April 1987 (aged 77)
- Original team: Auburn
- Height: 182 cm (6 ft 0 in)
- Weight: 80 kg (176 lb)

Playing career^{1}
Years	Club	Games (Goals)
1930–1931	Hawthorn	3 (0)
- ^{1} Playing statistics correct to the end of 1931.

Reg Davies (24 November 1909 – 10 April 1987) was an Australian rules footballer who played with Hawthorn in the Victorian Football League (VFL).
