= Moosa AbdulRahman Hassan =

Omani businessperson

Hajj Moosa AbdulRahman Hassan
- Born: Muscat
- Died: 21 April 1987
- Occupation: Businessman

Hajj Moosa AbdulRahman Hassan (Arabic: موسى بن عبد الرحمن بن حسن الرئيسي) was an Omani businessman, tribal leader, and landlord. He was born in the old town of Muscat and finished his studies in the American Mission School. He established a firm in 1927 in supplying coals and foodstuffs to British ships & frigates in Muscat.

== Postal services ==
Haji Moosa was one of the pioneer users and establishers of the Post Office Box in the Sultanate of Oman. Omanis abroad (especially East Africa, other Gulf States and India) used to send him mails to his personal mailbox and he used to deliver them to people later on, hence it was like a public address for anyone to use. The company still maintains the same P.O. Box 4 Muscat.

== Banking and finance ==
Hajj Moosa also established a money transfer service between the 1940s and 1960s through his well established and recognized P.O. Box 4 Muscat, which functionally operated as a first money transferring and wiring service hub for many Omanis who were living and working in East Africa, Gulf States and India. This complimentary service was introduced to aid Omanis, who were living abroad back then, to send and receive money, as it proved difficult due to the lack of professional and commercial banking services at that time. It is worth mentioning, this free of charge financial service was provided well before Western Union was established in the region. Furthermore, he was a founding member and the local director of The British Bank of The Middle East, which was established in 1948. The bank is one of the oldest banks not only in the Oman, but also in the entire region. Later on in the mid 1970s, he was involved in establishing Bank of Oman, Bahrain and Kuwait, which was a joined venture with Bank of Bahrain and Kuwait (BBK).

== Business and trade ==
Muscat, well through the early to mid part of the 20th century, was recognized as the center of trade between the Arabian Peninsula, Indian Coast, East Africa and other parts of Oman. Hajj Moosa traded variety of goods including dates, dried fish and timber. Furthermore, he housed the travelling traders in his residence, which later on was converted to a hall that is used to host various social occasions.

Due to his involvement of trading in kerosene, which was the main source of energy at that time, Hajj Moosa was chosen by The British Petroleum Company (BP) to become their representative in Oman. He owned a network of BP filling stations in Muscat and Batinah's coast.

He also got into a partnership with the British Gary McKenzie, and Oman's W.J.Towell & Co., which formed Gary McKenzie Moosa Towell Group Of Companies, which later became Oman United Agencies. The company catered for supplies and logistics for oil companies in Oman, as well as having a foodstuff division and a travel agency. Hajj Moosa originally formed the company in 1956 before it partnered up with other partners.

Moosa Furniture, which was the furnishing arm of the establishment, successfully did furnishing projects for many ministries and government owned organizations especially in the 1970s. Hajj Moosa also represented brands such as Canon cameras and Eterna Matic Swiss watches in the Omani market throughout the 1970s, until these agencies were sold to other merchants in the early 1980s.

== Agriculture and irrigation ==
Hajj Moosa partnered with a leading firm from the UK in order to construct a project for water supply in Muscat and Mattrah. He also represented various UK companies that are involved in water pumps and diesel generators, which helped to boost the agricultural sector in Oman very fast. They were supplied and distributed to many regions of Oman and The United Arab Emirates. Al Khaleej Daily Newspaper, on its 17 February 2012 issue, stated his contributions with late Sheikh Zayed bin Sultan Al Nahyan in the agricultural sector of the United Arab Emirates, specifically in Al Dhaqdaqah irrigation project in Ras al Khaimah.

== Electricity ==
As stated earlier, Hajj Moosa was the supplier of kerosene, which was the primary source of energy back then, as well as the distributor of diesel generators. Both of them were needed in order to supply the country’s demand for energy and electricity. He also formed the first electricity company in Mattrah-Oman, with two other partners, in order to cater for the increasing demand for energy in the country.

== Construction and real estate development ==
Moosa AbdulRahman Establishment was also involved in the construction sector when it partnered with the British Constructing firm, Costain, which was involved in building the Postal Office Building in Muscat, the expansions in Bait Al-Falaj in Ruwi area of Muscat, as well as defense camps in Bait Al-Falaj and Bidbid. He also partnered with Oman's leading businessmen, late Qais Al-Zawawi, Suhail Bahwan and Mohsin Haider Darwish to establish Qurum Contracting Company, one of the largest local contracting companies back then. The company was one of the pioneer investors in Madinat Al-Sultan Qaboos Project. Today the company owns and develops many commercial and residential real estate projects in Oman, UAE, Lebanon, The United Kingdom and Canada among others.

== Automotive ==
Hajj Moosa was an automotive dealer in the 1950s being successful in acquiring the agency of Holden, which makes him one of the oldest automotive dealers in Oman. He further became the agent of Bedford Trucks, which was also supplied for the Omani Army. In the 1960s, the automotive division got more agencies and represented Vauxhall and India Super Tires. In the 1970s & 1980’s, he became the distributor of Pontiac, Kawasaki, GMC, Opel, Suzuki, Foton, Mantra and many other leading global automotive brands. The defense and military division also kept growing by supplying specially built vehicles for the Omani Army.

== Governmental roles ==
Hajj Moosa AbdulRahman, played an instrumental role in establishing the first municipal council in Oman in the 1950s.

In addition, Oman's Currency Board was established in 1972 by a Royal Decree; Hajj Moosa was the Vice Chairman of the board and the Secretary of Finance of the board.

His Majesty, Sultan Qaboos bin Said Al-Said, issued a Royal Decree on 21 May 1972 to establish a committee to resolve commercial disputes, which consisted of the late Hajj Moosa, late Qais Al-Zawawi, Mohammed Al-Zubair, Mohsin Haider Darwish, late Ali Dawood Al-Raisi, late Hajj Jafar AbdulRahim and late Hajj Ali Sultan. He was also assigned in the 1970s in the committee to form Oman's Chamber of Commerce and Industry.

His Majesty Sultan Qaboos bin Said al Said, Sultan of Oman; granted late Hajj Moosa AbdulRahman in 1983 Oman's Civil Medal for his social, economical & political contributions to Oman & to Omani civil societies.

Hajj Moosa died on 21 April 1987, leaving a long legacy of accomplishments and services to his country & community, he is survived by one daughter (Ruqayyah) and two sons (Abdullah & Ali), who are the family’s patriarchs & looking after family’s business, social & governmental interests.

== Other sources ==
- Mohammed Al-Zubair (2008). A Journey Through Time. Muscat: BAZ Publishing. 13- (1990). The Postal History Of Oman. 2nd ed. Muscat: Ministry of Posts, Telegraphs & Telephones. 10.
- Nasser Al-Riyami (2009). Zanzibar - People & Places. 2nd ed. Cairo: Beirut Bookshop. 216.
- Dr. Mohammed Faris, 2012. Sheikh Zayed's Efforts In The Agricultural Sector In The 1960s. Al-Khaleej Daily Newspaper, 17 February.
- J.E. Peterson. (2004).
- The history of Oman (Part II) Abdullah bin Said Al Balushi 1990 and the Ministry of Post and Telegraph and Telephone
